= Gargantua (album) =

Studio album by Ash Grunwald with Scott Owen and Andy Strachan
- Released: 28 June 2013
- Length: 37:13
- Label: Delta Groove; Bloodlines; Shock

Ash Grunwald studio albums chronology
Trouble's Door (2012)	Gargantua (2013)	Now (2015)

Gargantua is the seventh studio album by Australian blues musician Ash Grunwald (with Scott Owen and Andy Strachan from The Living End). The album reportedly took six days to record and was released in June 2013, peaking at number 46 on the ARIA Charts.

== Background and release ==
In an interview with NQ Music Press, Grunwald explained his connection with Scott Owen goes to back to when they were in a cover band together. In 2012, the two of them were working together for a charity foundation and laid down the vocals for a cover of Gnarls Barkley's "Crazy". The duo invited Andy Strachan to work on the track and according to Grunwald, "it sounded amazing!". The next day, the trio were playing together at St Kilda Festival to over 6,000 people. The trio realised they all had a week spare in their schedules and so decided to record 10 songs together which consisted of renditions of some of Grunwald's greatest hits as well as a few covers.

== Reception ==
Mike Alexander from Stuff NZ said "While Grunwald is a capable enough vocalist, what he lacks in the wizened old voices of blues greats, he makes up for with a steaming repertoire of guitar licks." adding "Gargantua isn't quite the gorilla of an album that the cover artwork depicts but it still does the (monkey) business.".

Kristina from The Dwarf said "Gargantua is fun, frisky and dives into the realm of rock-n-roll, bringing back a retro-esque flavour with a hint of modern-time sounds and techniques through sophisticated beats."

Pete Laurie from The Music said "This isn't a hippie with an acoustic guitar stomping out his own beat; this is a blues disciple turning things up to 11 and recruiting what is possibly the most successful rhythm section working in Australian music today. "

== Track listing ==
Standard edition
No.	Title	Writer(s)	Length
1.	"The Last Stand"		3:22
2.	"Breakout"		3:50
3.	"Acting Cool"		4:23
4.	"Walking"		2:58
5.	"Crazy"	Brian Burton; Thomas Callaway; Gian Franco Reverberi; Gian Piero Reverberi	3:43
6.	"Black and Blue"	Barry Harvey; Phil Manning; Barry Sullivan; Matt Taylor	4:15
7.	"Raw"		3:33
8.	"Skywriter"		3:22
9.	"Mojo"		3:23
10.	"Smokestack Lightning"		4:24

== Charts ==
Chart (2013)	Peak position
Australian Albums (ARIA)	46

== Release history ==
Region	Date	Format	Edition(s)	Label	Catalogue
Australia	28 June 2013	CD; DD	Standard	Delta Groove / Bloodlines / Shock Records	DG11
Australia	22 February 2019	CD; Digital Download; Streaming	Reissue	Bloodlines Records	BLOOD38
