= Black and Blue (Chain song) =

Single by Chain

from the album Toward the Blues
- B-side: "Lightning Ground"
- Released: March 1971
- Recorded: Early 1971
- Genre: Blues
- Length: 4:51
- Label: Infinity
- Songwriters: Barry Harvey, Phil Manning, Barry Sullivan, Matt Taylor
- Producer: Chain

"Black and Blue" is a 1971 song by Chain which exemplifies, "genuine Australian blues". It is about a chain gang from the country's convict past, and it struck a chord with young suburban audiences, such that it reached No. 10 on the Go-Set National Top 60 singles chart. The song was co-written by all four members of Chain: Barry Harvey, Phil Manning, Barry Sullivan and Matt Taylor. It was awarded a Go-Set Silver Disc for 25,000 Australian sales and appeared at No. 31 on Go-Set's Top Singles for 1971.

"Black and Blue" appears on the double gold certified album, Toward the Blues, which was released in September 1971 and went to No. 6 nationally in Australia. The album reached ARIA gold status for the second time in 1998. The 30th anniversary "remixed" version of the album was released as a CD in September 2001. The 30th anniversary CD included three bonus songs; Chain's number 2 hit single "Judgement", "Blow in D", and the single version of "Black and Blue". Chain appeared at a special night to mark the 30th anniversary of the release of Toward the Blues held in Melbourne at the Mercury Lounge during September 2001.

== Cover versions ==
Manfred Mann's Earth Band released a cover version of "Black and Blue" on the album Messin'.

Ash Grunwald (with Scott Owen and Andy Strachan of The Living End) covered the song for the 2013 album Gargantua.

Jimmy Barnes and Joe Bonamassa covered the song for the Mushroom 50th Anniversary compilation Mushroom: Fifty Years of Making Noise (Reimagined).
