= Western Flyer (disambiguation) =

Western Flyer may mean:

- Western Flyer, an American country group
- Western Flyer (Australian group), an Australian group from the 1970s
- Western Flyer (bicycle), an American bicycle sold by Western Auto
- Western Flyer (boat), an American boat chartered by John Steinbeck
- RV Western Flyer, a research vessel operated by the Monterey Bay Aquarium Research Institute
- New Flyer Industries, a Canadian bus manufacturer formerly known as Western Flyer Coach
