= AIR Awards of 2012 =

Annual Australian music awards ceremony

- Date: 16 October 2012
- Venue: Revolt Art Space, Melbourne, Australia

Highlights
- Most wins: Chet Faker (2)
- Most nominations: Chet Faker (5)
- Website: https://air.org.au/air-awards/

The AIR Awards of 2012 (or Jägermeister Independent Awards of 2012) is the seventh annual Australian Independent Record Labels Association Music Awards (generally known as the AIR Awards) and was an award ceremony at Revolt Art Space, in Melbourne, Australia on 16 October 2012. The event was sponsored by German liquor brand, Jägermeister for the final time.

This year was the first for the category, Best Independent Label, was taken by Sydney hip hop label Elefant Traks, who in the past year have released albums from The Herd, Urthboy, Hermitude, Sietta, The Last Kinection and Sky High.

== Nominees and winners ==
=== AIR Awards ===
Winners are listed first and highlighted in boldface; other final nominees are listed alphabetically.

Best Independent Artist	Best Independent Album
**The Jezabels**; 360; Ball Park Music; Chet Faker; Royal Headache	**Royal Headache - Royal Headache** (RIP Society); 360 - Falling & Flying (Soulmate); DZ Deathrays - Bloodstreams (I Oh You); The Jezabels - Prisoner (MGM); The Temper Trap - The Temper Trap (Liberation)
Best Independent Single/EP	Best Breakthrough Independent Artist
**Chet Faker - Thinking in Textures** (Opulent); 360 - "Boys Like You" (Soulmate); Alpine - "Gasoline" (Ivy League); Oh Mercy - "Drums" (Casa Del Disco); San Cisco - "Awkward" (Island City Records)	**Chet Faker**; Husky; San Cisco; Royal Headache; The Rubens
Best Independent Blues and Roots Album	Best Independent Country Album
**Lanie Lane - To the Horses**; Ash Grunwald - Trouble's Door; John Butler - Tin Shed Tales; Saskwatch - Leave It All Behind; Xavier Rudd - Spirit Bird	**Jess Ribeiro & The Bone Collectors - My Little River**; Graeme Connors - At the Speed of Life; Luke O'Shea - The Drovers Wife; Sue Ray - Red Roses; Warren H. Williams - Urna Marra
Best Independent Dance/Electronica Album	Best Independent Dance/Electronica or Club Single
**Hermitude - HyperParadise**; Chet Faker - Thinking in Textures; Jonti - Twirligig; Oliver Tank - Dreams; T-Rek - Dance Music; Sampology - Doomsday Deluxe	**Tom Piper and Daniel Farley - "L.G.F.U."**; Chet Faker - "Terms and Conditions"; Flume - "Sleepless"; Parachute Youth - "Can't Get Better Than This"; Tonite Only - "Go"
Best Independent Hard Rock or Punk Album	Best Independent Hip Hop/Urban Album
**DZ Deathrays - Bloodstreams**; Calling All Cars - Dancing with a Dead Man; Frenzal Rhomb - Smoko at the Pet Food Factory; House vs. Hurricane - Crooked Teeth; The Peep Tempel - The Peep Tempel	**360 - Falling & Flying**; Funkoars - The Quickening; Katalyst - Deep Impressions; The Herd - Future Shade; Yung Warriors - Standing Strong
Best Independent Jazz Album	Best Independent Label
**Mike Nock - Hear and Know**; Barney McAll - Graft; Benjamin Hauptmann - Benjamin Hauptmann; Peter Knight - Fish Boast of Fishing; The Vampires - Garfish	**Elefant Traks**

== See also ==
- Music of Australia
