= Hand to Earth =

Australian music ensemble

Hand to Earth is an Australian music ensemble formed in 2016 that combines Indigenous Australian songlines with contemporary experimental music. The group consists of Yolŋu songkeepers Daniel and David Wilfred, Korean-Australian vocalist Sunny Kim, trumpeter Peter Knight, and clarinettist Aviva Endean. The ensemble has received an ARIA Award nomination and performed at major international venues.

== History ==
Hand to Earth grew out of the Australian Art Orchestra's long association with the Wilfred brothers and the Ngukurr community. Peter Knight, who served as artistic director of the Australian Art Orchestra from 2013 to 2023, formed the ensemble with the Wilfreds and other musicians.

The Australian Art Orchestra has maintained relationships with Wägilak musicians from Ngukurr since 2005, developing collaborations that musicologist Samuel Curkpatrick describes as "unprecedented in Australian music."

The ensemble premiered at AsiaTOPA (Asia-Pacific Triennial of Performing Arts) in February 2020 with a performance titled "Meeting Points Series: Hand to Earth" at Melbourne Recital Centre.

The ensemble has performed internationally at venues including the Pierre Boulez Saal in Berlin, Lincoln Center in New York City, and the Barbican Centre in London.

== Musical approach ==
The ensemble's repertoire centers on Yolŋu manikay (song cycles), an oral tradition from Arnhem Land estimated to be tens of thousands of years old. Manikay are public songs maintained by Yolŋu people that encode ancestral knowledge and connection to country. According to ethnomusicologist Samuel Curkpatrick, manikay represents a continuously practised musical tradition maintained by Yolŋu people of northeast Arnhem Land passed down through generations.

Hand to Earth's working method combines elements of free improvisation and composition. Knight has described the process as "weaving" different musical traditions rather than fully composing or freely improvising. Daniel Wilfred sings in the Wägilak language, while other members contribute contemporary instrumentation including, voice, yidaki, trumpet, clarinet, and electronics.

== Members ==
- Daniel Wilfred (voice, bilma) is a Wägilak man from Ngukurr, Northern Territory. He is a keeper of Yolŋu manikay from Arnhem Land. With David Wilfred, he received the NT Luminary Award during the 2020 Art Music Awards.
- David Wilfred (yidaki/didgeridoo, voice) is a Ritharrŋu man from Ngukurr, Northern Territory. He received the NT Luminary Award with Daniel Wilfred at the 2020 Art Music Awards.
- Sunny (Yoon Sun) Kim (voice, percussion) is a Korean born vocalist, improviser, and composer now based in Melbourne. She studied jazz at the New England Conservatory and has released five albums as a bandleader.
- Peter Knight (trumpet, electronics) served as artistic director of the Australian Art Orchestra from 2013 to 2023. He has received four Art Music Awards and multiple ARIA Award nominations.
- Aviva Endean (bass clarinet, winds, electronics) is a clarinettist, composer, and sound artist. She has received the Freedman Music Fellowship.

== Discography ==
- Hand to Earth (2021, Australian Art Orchestra)
  - Nominated for ARIA Award for Best World Music Album (2022)
  - Nominated for Songlines UK Top of the World (2022)
- Mokuy (EP, 2023, Room40)
  - Produced by Lawrence English
  - Winner of 2024 Music Victoria Award for Best Experimental Work
  - Nominated for APRA/AMC Art Music Awards Best Jazz Album (2024)
- Ŋurru Wäŋa (2025, Room40)
  - Produced by Lawrence English and Peter Knight
  - Released August 22, 2025
  - Features Polish violinist Amalia Umeda on one track

== Awards and nominations ==
- 2025 – Songlines Music Awards – Nominated for Best Asia & Pacific Album (Ŋurru Wäŋa)
- 2024 – Music Victoria Award – Winner for Best Experimental Work (MOKUY)
- 2024 – APRA/AMC Art Music Awards – Nominated for Best Jazz Album (MOKUY)
- 2022 – ARIA Awards – Nominated for Best World Music Album (Hand to Earth)
- 2022 – APRA/AMC Art Music Awards – Nominated for Best Jazz Album (Hand to Earth)
- 2022 – Songlines UK – Nominated for Top of the World

== Notable performances ==
The ensemble has performed at venues including the Pierre Boulez Saal in Berlin (2022, 2025), Barbican Centre in London (2025), Lincoln Center in New York City (2024), Bimhuis in Amsterdam (2023), and deSingel in Antwerp (2025).

Festival appearances include WOMADelaide (2022), Jazztopad Festival in Wrocław, Poland (2023, 2024), Vancouver International Jazz Festival (2024), Dark MOFO in Tasmania (2025), and Melbourne International Jazz Festival (2023).

== Collaborations ==
In 2025, Hand to Earth performed with British jazz musician Shabaka at the Barbican Centre and Pierre Boulez Saal.

The group has also collaborated with Sámi musician Ánnámáret (Anna Näkkäläjärvi-Länsman) in a project titled Two Rivers, exploring connections between Wägilak and Sámi musical traditions.

In 2024, Hand to Earth collaborated with Polish violinist Amalia Umeda for performances in North America including Lincoln Centre in New York, and with American drummer, Hamid Drake for Jazztopad New York at Public Records in Brooklyn.
