= AIR Awards of 2010 =

5th edition of annual Australian music award

- Date: 1 October 2010
- Venue: The Forum Theatre, Melbourne, Australia
- Hosted by: Scott Dooley

Highlights
- Most wins: Cloud Control and Dan Sultan (2)
- Most nominations: Cloud Control, Dan Sultan and Sia (3)
- Website: https://air.org.au/air-awards/

The AIR Awards of 2010 (or Jägermeister Independent Awards of 2010) is the fifth annual Australian Independent Record Labels Association Music Awards (generally known as the AIR Awards) and was an award ceremony at The Forum Theatre, in Melbourne, Australia on 1 October 2010. The event was again sponsored by German liquor brand, Jägermeister.

The event was hosted by Scott Dooley for Nova 96.9 and Australian pay-TV music broadcaster Channel V aired the event in October 2010.

For the first time, a category for Most Popular Artist was added to the awards, as voted by Nova 96.9 listeners.

== Performers ==
- British India
- Cloud Control
- Joe Chindamo
- M-Phazes
- Sally Seltmann
- The Amity Affliction

== Nominees and winners ==
=== AIR Awards ===
Winners are listed first and highlighted in boldface; other final nominees are listed alphabetically.

Best Independent Artist	Best Independent Album
**Dan Sultan**; British India; Cloud Control; Dan Kelly; Eddy Current Suppression Ring; Sia	**Cloud Control – Bliss Release** (Ivy League); Dan Kelly – Dan Kelly's Dream (Shock); Dan Sultan – Get Out While You Can (MGM); Eddy Current Suppression Ring – Rush to Relax (Aaarght! /Shock); Rowland S. Howard – Pop Crimes (Liberation); Sia – We Are Born (Inertia)
Best Independent Single/EP	Breakthrough Independent Artist
**Little Red – "Rock It"**; Bliss N Eso – "Down By the River"; Philadelphia Grand Jury – "The Good News"; Sia – "Clap Your Hands"; The Jezabels – She's So Hard; The Temper Trap – "Love Lost"	**Cloud Control**; Bridezilla; Otouto; Philadelphia Grand Jury; Richard in Your Mind; The Jezebels
Best Independent Blues and Roots Album	Best Independent Country Album
**Dan Sultan – Get Out While You Can**; Ash Grunwald – Hot Mama Vibes; Jeff Lang – Chimeradour; Mama Kin - Beat and Holler; The Beautiful Girls – Spooks; The Red Eyes – Red Army	**Kasey Chambers, Poppa Bill and The Little Hillbillies – Kasey Chambers, Poppa Bill and the Little Hillbillies**; Amber Lawrence – When It All Comes Down; Deborah Conway – Half Man, Half Woman; The Dingoes – Tracks; The Sunny Cowgirls – Summer
Best Independent Dance/Electronica Album	Best Independent Hard Rock or Punk Album
**Midnight Juggernauts – The Crystal Axis**; Faux Pas – Noiseworks; Jamie Lloyd – Beware of the Light; Nick Thayer – Just Let It Go; Opiuo – Slurp And Giggle; Space Invaders – Soul:Fi	**Parkway Drive – Deep Blue**; 50 Lions – Where Life Expires; Calling All Cars – Hold, Hold, Fire; House vs. Hurricane – Perspectives; The Amity Affliction – Youngbloods
Best Independent Hip Hop/Urban Album	Best Independent Jazz Album
**Urthboy – Spitshine**; Horrorshow – Inside Story; Lowrider – Round the World; M-Phazes – Good Gracious; Ozi Batla – Wild Colonial	**Stu Hunter – The Gathering**; Alister Spence Trio – Fit; Allan Browne Quintet – Une Saison En Enfer; Ben Winkelman Trio – Odysseys; Bernie McGann – Double Dutch; Jamie Oehlers and Paul Grabowsky – On a clear Day; Joe Chindamo – Another Place Another Time; Jonathan Zwartz – The Sea; Mike Nock Trio – An Accumulation of Subtleties; Way Out West – The Effects of the Weather

=== AIR Awards (public voted) ===
Most Popular Independent Artist (As Voted by Nova Listeners)
- **John Butler Trio**
  - Basement Birds
  - Birds of Tokyo
  - Bliss N Eso
  - Little Red
  - Midnight Juggernauts
  - Philadelphia Grand Jury
  - Sia
  - The Cat Empire
  - The Temper Trap

== See also ==
- Music of Australia
