= Bakery (band) =

Australian musical group

- Origin: Perth, Western Australia, Australia
- Genres: Progressive rock, hard rock
- Years active: 1970–1975
- Labels: Astor, Mushroom
- Past members: Hank Davis; Mal Logan; Eddie McDonald; Peter Walker; John Worrall; Rex Bullen; Tom Davidson; Mark Verschuer; Steve Hogg; Paul Ewing; Barry Leef; Phil Lawson; Jackie Orszaczky

Bakery were an Australian progressive hard rock band formed in 1970 in Perth. The original line-up was Hank Davis on drums, Mal Logan on keyboards, Eddie McDonald on bass guitar, Peter Walker on guitar, and John Worrall on vocals and flute. They released two albums on Astor Records, Rock Mass for Love (August 1971) and Momento (August 1972) and had a Perth hit with "No Dying in the Dark". Bakery appeared at the Sunbury Pop Festival in January 1973 and disbanded in early 1975.

== History ==
Bakery were a progressive hard rock band formed in early 1970 in Perth by two New Zealand-born musicians, Hank Davis on drums and Eddie McDonald on bass guitar – both were ex-members of Avengers. The line-up was completed by Mal Logan on keyboards (ex-Rebels, a New Zealand band), Peter Walker on guitar (ex-Jelly Roll Bakers) and John Worrall on vocals and flute. Logan soon left and, by October, he was a member of Healing Force and, later, in Chain and Little River Band. By mid-1970, Bakery's Davis, McDonald and Walker were joined by Rex Bullen on keyboards (Bitter Lemons) and Tom Davidson on vocals. Worrall had left for Ssarb and in 1972 was a founding member of Fatty Lumpkin.

Bakery's debut album, Rock Mass for Love, was issued in August 1971 on Astor Records which, according to Australian rock music historian Ian McFarlane, had been recorded live at a Mass "held at St George's Cathedral on 21 March 1971" and was "not indicative of the band's style of progressive hard rock". The group released two singles, "Bloodsucker" (February 1971) and "No Dying in the Dark" (July), before Mark Verschuer (Barrelhouse) replaced Davidson on vocals. "No Dying in the Dark" was a top ten hit on the Perth singles chart. The band's influences were Black Sabbath, Deep Purple and Led Zeppelin.

In August 1972 they released their second album, Momento, by which time Steve Hogg had replaced McDonald on bass guitar and also performed vocals (Juke, King Biscuit Company, Nostra Damus) and Paul Ewing replaced Bullen on organ and vocals; when Verschuer left he was not replaced as Davis, Ewing, Hogg and Walker shared lead vocals. McDonald initially joined a new group, McAskill, and by 1975 was a member of the Phil Manning Band. Bullen worked in Jim Keays' Southern Cross and Marc Hunter's backing band before Bullen died in March 1983. In January 1973 Bakery performed at the Sunbury Pop Festival and played the festival and concert circuit along Australia's east coast. In February that year, New Zealand-born Barry Leef joined on lead vocals. In April "Living with a Memory", from their Sunbury performance, appeared on the triple-live album The Great Australian Rock Festival Sunbury 1973 on Mushroom Records. By that time Phil Lawson had replaced Hogg on bass guitar, with Lawson replaced in August by Jackie Orszaczky (Syrius). The group continued to perform without further recording until February 1975.

== Members ==
- John Worrall – vocals, flute (1970)
- Peter Walker – guitars, vocals (1970–1975)
- Mal Logan – keyboards (1970)
- Eddie McDonald – bass (1970–1972)
- Hank Davis – drums, vocals (1970–1975)
- Rex Bullen – keyboards (1970–1972)
- Tom Davidson – vocals (1970–1971)
- Mark Verschuer – vocals (1971–1972)
- Steve Hogg – bass, vocals (1972–1973)
- Paul Ewing – keyboards, vocals (1972–1974)
- Barry Leef – vocals (1972–1975)
- Phil Lawson – bass (1973)
- Jackie Orszaczky – bass (1973–1975)

== Discography ==
=== Studio albums ===
List of albums, with selected chart positions
| Title | Album details | Peak chart positions |
| Title | Album details | AUS |
|---|---|---|
| Rock Mass for Love | Released: August 1971; Format: LP; Label: Astor Records ALPS-1032 | 21 |
| Momento | Released: August 1972; Format: LP; Label: Astor Records ALPS-1035 | - |

=== Singles ===
List of singles, with selected chart positions
| Year | Title | Peak chart positions |
| Year | Title | AUS |
|---|---|---|
| 1971 | "Bloodsucker"/"Leave Scruffy Alone" | 82 |
| 1971 | "Trust in the Lord"/"No Dying in the Dark" | 94 |
