= Peter Knight (musician) =

Australian musician and composer (born 1965)

Dr. Peter Knight
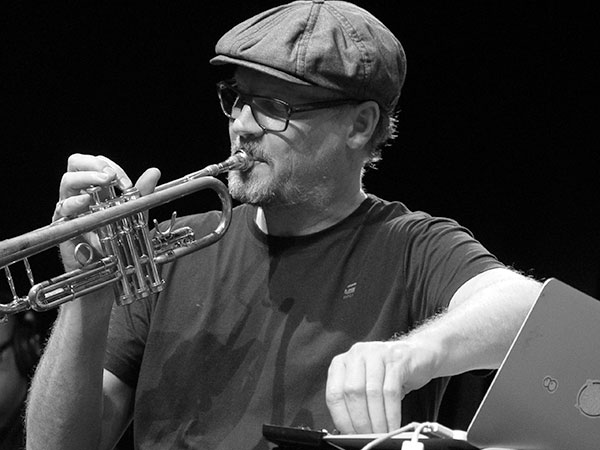
- Knight in 2014

Background information
- Born: 12 March 1965 (age 61); Orbost, Australia
- Genres: Jazz, Experimental
- Occupations: Composer, Musician, Artistic director
- Instruments: Trumpet, electronics
- Years active: 1990–present

Peter Knight (born 12 March 1965) is an Australian musician, composer and producer. He was the Artistic Director and co-CEO of the Australian Art Orchestra from 2013 to 2023 and founding member of Melbourne group Way Out West., 5+2 Brass Ensemble, and Hand to Earth

He is well known for his solo releases, 'For a Moment the Sky Knew My Name' (2025 Room40), 'Shadow Phase' (2022 Room40), Fish Boast of Fishing (2011) and Allotrope (2012) and composition for theatre in particular with performance maker Tamara Saulwick.

More recently he has composed for film including Paul Goldman's feature Kid Snow which he composed with violinist Warren Ellis (musician). and Longe da Estrada dir Hugo Vieira da Silva which premiered at LEFFEST in Portugal

== Early life ==
Peter Knight grew up in Orbost in country Victoria then went to school in Melbourne. He started playing trumpet when he was at primary school.

== Career ==
=== In collaboration ===
Knight played trumpet and electric bass, in rock bands through his 20s including Cattletruck, which toured Australia extensively. He also toured and recorded with Big Pig, Frente, Underground Lovers, You Am I Spiderbait and many others.

Knight formed Way Out West with Vietnamese born multi instrumentalist, Dung Nguyen, in 2002 with the intention of exploring jazz as a global language while simultaneously responding to Knight and Nguyen's local neighbourhood, Melbourne's inner west. The band has since released four albums mostly of Knight's compositions. They have won numerous awards and nominations and have played at major music festivals including Montreal, Veneto and Vancouver jazz festivals. Their most recent work '1988' premiered at The Substation in 2022 and was also presented as part of OzAsia Festival in 2023.

Hand to Earth was formed with Indigenous song keepers, Daniel and David Wilfred from Ngukurr NT along with Korean-born vocalist, Sunny Kim (singer), and clarinetist, Aviva Endean. It was originally produced by Australian Art Orchestra when Knight was Artistic Director but in 2023 became an independent ensemble. Since then the group has toured to venues in Australia and around the world including the Barbican where they collaborated with Shabaka and Lincoln Centre in New York. In 2022 it was nominated for an ARIA award for Best World Music Album for its self-titled debut album released on AAO Recordings. In 2023 it released MOKUY on the ROOM40 label run by Lawrence English who also co-produced the record with Knight. In 2025 it released Ŋurru Wäŋa on Room40 co-produced by Knight and English

=== 2000-present: Solo career ===
In the late 1990s he concentrated on jazz and released his debut album as leader of Peter Knight Quartet in 2001 Between Two Moments. The album was positively received and the Quartet toured nationally. He has since regularly released solo work including Fish Boast of Fishing, Allotrope, and Shadow Phase.

=== 2013-2023: Australian Art Orchestra ===
In 2013 Knight became Artistic Director of Australian Art Orchestra (AAO), following 20 years with the group's founder pianist and composer Paul Grabowsky. Under Knight, the group has pursued a more contemporary direction, collaborating with a number of well respected international composers, including Canadian composer Nicole Lizée and Japanese composer Keiichiro Shibuya. The development of their collaborations with Australian indigenous musicians, and musicians from Asia has continued under Knight's direction receiving critical acclaim. In 2014 and 2022 the group won the AMC Art Music Award for Organisation of the Year at the APRA Awards.

In 2016 Knight won Albert H. Maggs Composition Award for his work Diomira inspired by [Italo Calvino] and his story of the same name. The winning work was commissioned by the Australian Art Orchestra and premiered at the Metropolis New Music Festival in May. This award came in the form of a commission to develop the piece into a full-length concert work. Diomira was released on Hospital Hill in 2021 on an album called Crossed and Recrossed, which also includes a work called The Plains, inspired by author Gerald Murnane which premiered at [Jazztopad] in Poland in 2018 and received positive reviews.

In 2017 Knight performed at the 14th Jazztopad festival in Poland during the Melting Pot concerts.

At OzAsia 2017, Knight curated a concert program for the festival that saw the AAO collaborating with ghuzeng player Mindy Meng, Japanese composer Keiichiro Shibuya, p'ansori singer Bae Il Dong (Korea) and traditional songman from Arnhem Land, Daniel Wilfred.

=== Projects with Tamara Saulwick ===
Knight also works extensively with his partner, Tamara Saulwick, who is an internationally renowned performance maker and artistic director of Chamber Made Opera. Together they have made a number of works: Pin Drop, which won a Green Room Award in 2010 for Outstanding Production in Alternative and Hybrid Performance and was nominated for Best Composition and Sound Design. The pair was also commissioned by the ABC to turn this project into a radiophonic work

Pin Drop toured Australia and also played in Glasgow at Tramway in 2014.

Alterwas a performance using a constructed sound and light installation featuring 16 iPads (each participant used an iPad during the performance). The piece was commissioned for the Festival of Live Art by Arts House.

Seddon Archives was a headphone audio walk commissioned by Big West Festival. Endings which won a 2016 Green Room Award and toured through 2017-18 to Canadian Stage (Toronto), Brighton Festival (UK), Dublin Theatre Festival, pUsh Festival Vancouver and On the Boards (Seattle). The ABC commissioned a radiophonic version of Endings in 2016. In 2022 the pair premiered a new work at The Substation in Melbourne. My Self In That Moment, made with Chamber Made, is an audio-visual work for 49 tablets and live voice (Jessica Aszodi and Tina Stefanou alternately). The work, "takes a dystopian view of the lost soul of the self in the digital age"

== Academic achievements ==
In 2003, Knight was awarded the Alan C. Rose Memorial Fund Project Scholarship. In 2004, the Keith and Elizabeth Travelling Fellowship. In 2006 he received a Myer Foundation grant for new sound installation work with Double Venturi. In 2007, he received a Griffith University full scholarship for doctoral studies in composition and a Tom and Isobel Rolston Scholarship Banff Centre for the Arts.

Knight holds an MMus Master in Music Performance from University of Melbourne (VCA) and is also a Doctor of Musical Arts, which was awarded by Queensland of Conservatorium Griffith University QCGU. In 2013 he was awarded QCGU Alumnus of the Year.

In 2013, he was granted the Australia Council Music Fellowship (for 2013/14).

In 2014 Knight was a Music Omi musician in residence at Omi International Arts Center, Hudson, New York.

== Discography ==
=== Solo albums ===
Title	Details
Between Two Moments (as Peter Knight Quartet)	Released: 2002; Format: CD, digital download
All the Gravitation of Silence	Released: 2006; Format: CD, digital download
Residual (with Dung Nguyen)	Released: May 2011; Label: Parenthèses Records; Format: CD, digital download
Fish Boast of Fishing	Released: 2011; Label: Listen Hear Collective; Format: CD, digital download
Allotrope	Released: 2012; Label: Peter Knight; Format: CD, digital download
Re-Residual	Released: October 2014; Format: CD, digital download; Remix album
Daughter's Fever (with Grand Salvo)	Released: 2015; Label: Peter Knight; Format: CD, digital download
Way Out West (with various artists)	Released: June 2016; Label: Peter Knight; Format: CD, digital download
Peter Knight (Australian Art Orchestra)	Released: September 2021; Label: Peter Knight; Format: CD, digital download
Shadow Phase (with various artists)	Released: October 2021; Label: Room40; Format: LP, digital download
Too Long: Didn't Read (with TL:DR)	Released: July 2025; Label: Peter Knight; Format: digital download

== See also ==
- Way Out West (jazz group)

== Awards and nominations ==
=== AIR Awards ===
The Australian Independent Record Awards (commonly known informally as AIR Awards) is an annual awards night to recognise, promote and celebrate the success of Australia's Independent Music sector.

Year	Nominee / work	Award	Result
2012	Fish Boast of Fishing	Best Independent Jazz Album	Won

=== Albert H. Maggs Composition Award ===
The Albert H. Maggs Composition Award is a commission-based Australian classical composition award given in order to "encourage and assist composers who might otherwise abandon their efforts for want of means". They commenced in 1966.

Year	Nominee / work	Award	Result
2016	Himself for Diomira	Albert H. Maggs Composition Award	Won

=== APRA Awards ===
The APRA Awards are presented annually from 1982 by the Australasian Performing Right Association (APRA), "honouring composers and songwriters".

Year	Nominee / work	Award	Result
2008	"Postcard from Footscray"	Jazz Work of the Year	Nominated
2012	"Unknownness 1"	Jazz Work of the Year	Nominated
2015	himself	Award for Excellence in Jazz	Nominated
2015	himself	Award for Excellence by an Individual	Nominated
2016	himself	Award for Excellence by an Individual	Nominated
2017	"Diomira" (performed by Australian Art Orchestra)	Instrumental Work of the Year	Nominated
2020	"The Plains" (performed by Australian Art Orchestra)	Performance of the Year: Jazz / Improvised Music	Nominated
2021	Closed Beginnings (Knight, Tariro Mavondo, Reuben Lewis) for Mavondo (poetry), Lewis and Knight (music), Jem Savage (sound production), Leo Dale (video production)	Work of the Year: Electroacoustic/Sound Art	Won

=== ARIA Music Awards ===
The ARIA Music Awards is an annual ceremony presented by Australian Recording Industry Association (ARIA), which recognise excellence, innovation, and achievement across all genres of the music of Australia. They commenced in 1987.

Year	Nominee / work	Award	Result	Ref.
2021	Closed Beginnings (with Australian Art Orchestra, Reuben Lewis and Tariro Mavondo)	Best Jazz Album	Nominated	
2022	Hand to Earth (with Australian Art Orchestra, Daniel Wilfred, Sunny Kim & Aviva Endean)	Best World Music Album	Nominated	
2025	Too Long; Didn't Read (with TL;DR)	Best Jazz Album	Nominated	

=== Australian Jazz Bell Awards ===
The Australian Jazz Bell Awards are annual music awards for the jazz music genre in Australia. They were named in honour of Australian jazz pianist, composer and band leader, Graeme Bell (1914–2012).

Year	Nominee / work	Award	Result
2012	Fish Boast of Fishing	Most Original Australian Jazz Album	Won

=== Green Room Awards ===
The Green Room Awards are peer awards which recognise excellence in cabaret, dance, drama, fringe theatre, musical theatre and opera in Melbourne.

Year	Nominee / work	Award	Result
2011	Pin Drop (with Tamara Saulwick)	Best Composition and Sound Design	Nominated
2016	Endings (with Tamara Saulwick)	Green Room Theatre Award	Won

=== Helpmann Awards ===
The Helpmann Awards are accolades for live entertainment and performing arts in Australia, presented by industry group Live Performance Australia.

Year	Nominee / work	Award	Result
2015	Endings (with Tamara Saulwick)	Best New Australian Work	Nominated

=== Music Victoria Awards ===
The Music Victoria Awards, are an annual awards night celebrating Victorian music. They commenced in 2005.

Year	Nominee / work	Award	Result	Ref.
2016	Way Out West	Best Jazz Album	Won	
2022	Peter Knight	Best Jazz Work	Nominated	
