= Sunny Kim =

Sunny Kim may refer to:

- Sun-woo Kim (born 1977), nicknamed Sunny, South Korean baseball pitcher
- Sunny Kim (singer) (born 1979), South Korean composer and singer
