= Long Time =

Long Time or Longtime may refer to:

- "Foreplay/Long Time", a 1976 song by Boston
- "Long Time", a 2011 song by Cake from Showroom of Compassion
- "Longtime" (Ash Grunwald song), 2012
- "Long Time" (Blondie song), 2017
- "Long Time", a 2018 song by Playboi Carti from the album Die Lit
- "Longtime", a 2020 song by Wizkid from Made in Lagos
