= Toward the Blues =

Studio album by Chain
- Released: September 1971
- Studio: T.C.S. Studios (Melbourne)
- Genre: Blues
- Length: 42:38
- Label: Infinity
- Producer: Chain and John Sayers

Chain chronology
Chain Live (1970)	Toward the Blues (1971)	Live Again (1972)

Toward the Blues is a studio album by the Australian blues band Chain that reached No. 6 on the Kent Music Report albums chart. It is listed in the book 100 Best Australian Albums (2010).

The 30th anniversary edition (September 2001) of the album added an 's' to the word Toward of the album title, Towards the Blues.

== Track listing ==
All songs written by Phil Manning, Barry Harvey, Barry Sullivan and Matt Taylor; except where noted.

=== Original edition ===
1. "32/20" (Robert Johnson, Traditional, arranged by Chain) – 4:11
2. "Snatch It Back and Hold It" (Junior Wells) – 5:04
3. "Boogie" – 10:45
4. "Booze Is Bad News Blues" – 7:47
5. "Albert Gooses Gonna Turn the Blues Loose" – 7:06 (instrumental)
6. "Black and Blue" – 4:51

=== 30th anniversary edition ===
1. "Black and Blue" (single version)
2. "Judgement"
3. "Blow in D"
4. "Thirty Two Twenty Blues" (Robert Johnson, Traditional arranged by Chain)
5. "Snatch It Back and Hold It" (Junior Wells)
6. "Boogie"
7. "Booze Is Bad News Blues"
8. "Albert Gooses Gonna Turn the Blues"
9. "Black and Blue" (original album version)

== Charts ==
Chart (1971)	Peak position
Australia (Kent Music Report)	6

== Certifications ==
Region	Certification	Certified units/sales
Australia (ARIA)	Gold	35,000^{^}
^{^} Shipments figures based on certification alone.
