= Raise the People =

Studio album by Calling All Cars
- Released: 7 March 2014
- Label: Cooking Vinyl Australia

Calling All Cars chronology
Dancing with a Dead Man (2011)	Raise the People (2014)

Singles from Raise the People
- 1. "Werewolves" Released: September 2013; 2. "Standing in the Ocean" Released: January 2014; 3. "Good God!" Released: May 2014; 4. "Every Day Is the Same" Released: September 2014

Raise the People is the third studio album by Australian Alternative rock band Calling All Cars, released on 7 March 2014.

== Track listing ==
1. "Raise the People"
2. "Black & White"
3. "Standing in the Ocean"
4. "Werewolves"
5. "Every Day Is the Same"
6. "Good God!"
7. "It Don't Matter"
8. "Running On the Sun"
9. "My Red Light"
10. "Looking Through Your Window"

== Charts ==
Chart (2014)	Peak position
Australian Albums (ARIA)	26
