= Dancing with a Dead Man =

Studio album by Calling All Cars
- Released: 5 August 2011
- Recorded: Studios in the City, Melbourne
- Genre: Alternative rock
- Length: 44:06
- Label: Shock
- Producer: Tom Larkin

Calling All Cars chronology
Hold, Hold, Fire (2010)	Dancing with a Dead Man (2011)	Raise the People (2014)

Singles from Dancing with a Dead Man
- 1. "Reptile" Released: May 2011; 2. "No Sleep" Released: July 2011; 3. "Worlds Collide" Released: November 2011; 4. "She's Delirious" Released: March 2012

Dancing with a Dead Man is the second studio album by the Australian rock band Calling All Cars, released on 5 August 2011. It was selected as Triple J's Feature Album in that month.

At the AIR Awards of 2012, the album was nominated for Best Independent Hard Rock or Punk Album.

== Track listing ==
All tracks are written by Calling All Cars

Dancing With A Dead Man
No.	Title	Length
1.	"Redline"	2:27
2.	"Reptile"	4:06
3.	"No Sleep"	3:15
4.	"Dancing With A Dead Man"	4:29
5.	"Worlds Collide"	4:28
6.	"Autobiotics"	3:21
7.	"The Desert Sun"	4:19
8.	"She's Delirious"	3:26
9.	"Fireworks In a Hurricane"	4:14
10.	"Throw Me to the Wolves"	3:20
11.	"Wait For War"	5:21
12.	"Nothing (Bonus Track - iTunes Exclusive)"	3:37

== Charts ==
Chart (2011)	Peak position
Australian Albums (ARIA)	20

== Release history ==
Region	Date	Label	Format	Catalogue
Australia	5 August 2011	Shock	CD, Digital download	DEAD001
