= Yung Warriors =

Australian hip hop group

- Also known as: Tjimba and the Yung Warriors
- Origin: Melbourne, Victoria, Australia
- Genre: Hip Hop
- Years active: 2007-present
- Labels: Blackwing Music, Payback Records
- Members: Tjimba Possum Burns; Danny "D-Boy" Ramzan
- Past members: Narjik Day Burns

Yung Warriors (also called Tjimba and the Yung Warriors) are an Australian hip hop group, formed in 2007.

They released their debut album Warrior for Life in June 2007.

Yung Warriors played at 2008 Big Day Out, at Yabun in Sydney, and at the World Indigenous Peoples Conference: Education in Melbourne Their music has had national airplay on Triple J.

They were nominated for Deadly Awards in 2008 and 2009.

== Members ==
- Tjimba Possum Burns
- Danny Ramzan
- Kidd Benny

Former members

- Narjiic Day-Burns

== Discography ==
=== Studio albums ===
Title	Details
Warrior for Life (with Tjimba)	Released: June 2007; Label: Sound Vault Records (SV0584); Format: CD, digital download
Standing Strong	Released: 18 May 2012; Label: Payback Records (WYPB02); Format: CD, digital download
Turnt Up	Released: 21 November 2014; Label: Blackwing Music (BWM003); Format: CD, digital download

=== Singles ===
Year	Title	Album
2017	"Warrior for Life" (with Tjimba)	Warrior for Life
2011	"Just a Thought"	Standing Strong
2011	"Black Boys" (with Coloured Stone)	non-album single
2012	"Standing Strong"	Standing Strong
2012	"Family Love"	Standing Strong
2013	"Shake That Thing" (featuring Gurrenah)	Standing Strong
2014	"Money (If I Had It All)"	Turnt Up

== Awards and nominations ==
=== AIR Awards ===
The Australian Independent Record Awards (commonly known informally as AIR Awards) is an annual awards night to recognise, promote and celebrate the success of Australia's Independent Music sector.

Year	Nominee / work	Award	Result
2012	Standing Strong	Best Independent Hip Hop/Urban Album	Nominated

=== Music Victoria Awards ===
The Music Victoria Awards are an annual awards night celebrating Victorian music. They commenced in 2006.

Year	Nominee / work	Award	Result
2013	Yung Warriors	Best Indigenous Act	Nominated
