= Cattletruck =

Australian pop rock group

- Origin: Melbourne, Australia
- Genres: Pop rock, rock, blues rock
- Years active: 1985–1988, 2016–
- Label: Regular Records Laneway Music
- Members: Paul Janovskis, Phil Viggiano, Greg Aldridge, Geoffrey Howard, Andrew Persichetti
- Past members: Bruce Coombs, Charles Todd, James Martin, Nick Cross, Paul Janovskis, Peter Knight, Steve Colebrook, Philip Viggiano, Tony Dennis

Cattletruck are an Australian Pop rock/rock/blues rock group formed in 1985. The group released two studio albums, Ready to Believe in 1987 and Welcome to Our Blues in 2026.

== History ==
Formed in St Kilda in 1985, Cattletruck was an Australian semi-acoustic punkabilly covers band. The group later transitioned into an electric ensemble, incorporating elements of pop and rock and roll into their sound.

Fronted by Paul Janovskis, with line-ups that included Tony Dennis, Peter Knight, Nick Cross, Phil Viggiano, Bruce Coombs, Charles Todd and James Martin, the band embodied the restless spirit of Melbourne’s fertile 1980s live scene.

In early 1985 singer/guitarist Paul Janovskis decided to "get serious" and the group independently produced a single "Never Is", which earned public radio airplay and opened doors to support slots with A-list Australian and international acts including Hoodoo Gurus, Models, Midnight Oil, Icehouse, Australian Crawl, Hunters & Collectors, the Birthday Party, Screamin' Jay Hawkins, Violent Femmes, New Order, Los Lobos, OMD and Jason & the Scorchers. By 1986, they had signed with Regular Records.

In December 1987 their first studio album Ready to Believe was released, peaking at number 58 on the Australian charts.

After a long hiatus, Janovskis returned to performing in 2009 Solo/Acoustic, soon touring extensively in Cambodia and Vietnam as an acoustic duo over several years, specialising in East Texas blues with sideman, ace guitarist Matt Dwyer. A live album, ‘The Wild Wild East’ was released in 2024 commemorating this period

In 2016, encouraged by Melbourne rock luminary Geoffrey Howard, they decided to commemorate the 30-year Anniversary of the release of the ‘Ready to Believe’ album, assembling a new line-up for a series of shows. This line up consisted of Greg Aldridge, Drew Bascombe, Geoff Howard, and original members Paul Janovskis and Philip Viggiano.

A live album recorded at the first show at the Melbourne venue the Corner Hotel titled ‘Live at The Corner’ released in 2021.

Back in 2017, Janovskis digitised his extensive back catalogue of unreleased Cattletruck tracks, demos, extended mixes and rarities, releasing the collections ‘Extended Versions’, ‘Platinum Sessions’, ‘Acoustica’, ‘Powerplant Sessions”, ‘Sydney Sessions” and ‘Live: Nineteen Eighty Six.’

At the conclusion of the 2016 Anniversary run of shows the band decided to stay together. Paul was collaborating closely with Geoffrey Howard on new material with a view to recording a new studio album. Songs were developed and an initial pre-production rehearsal was held several days prior the series of Melbourne COVID19 Lockdowns commencing. Further band work was postponed for the 20 months due to the pandemic.

During the lockdowns Paul recorded and released a number of acoustic solo versions of new songs with video.

In January 2022 studio recording began for a new Cattletruck album, with sessions continuing until late 2025. The recording band consisted of Paul Janovskis, Greg Aldridge, Stephen ‘Irish’ O’Prey, Phil Viggiano and Geoffrey Howard.

The album, titled “Welcome to Our Blues” featuring a new strong rootsy blues-rock sound and ten original songs with a special guest appearance by Joe Camilleri on Sax will be released in 2026 in conjunction with a series of live Festival appearances across Australia during the year.

== Discography ==
=== Albums ===
| Title | Album details | Peak chart positions |
| Title | Album details | AUS |
|---|---|---|
| Ready to Believe | Released: November 1987; Label: Regular Records (L 38720); Formats: CD, Cassette, LP | 58 |
| Live: Nineteen Eighty Six | Released: 30 November 2017; Label: Laneway Music; Formats: digital download, streaming; recorded Live at Ormond Hall, 1986 | - |
| Acoustica | Released: 30 November 2017; Label: Laneway Music; Formats: digital download, streaming | - |
| Extended Versions | Released: 16 December 2017; Label: Laneway Music; Formats: digital download, streaming | - |
| Powerplant Sessions - EP | Released: 16 December 2017; Label: Laneway Music; Formats: digital download, streaming | |
| Sydney Sessions - EP | Released: 16 December 2017; Label: Laneway Music; Formats: digital download, streaming | |
| Live at the Corner | Released: 18 June 2021; Label: Laneway Music; Formats: digital download, streaming | - |
| The Wild Wild East | Released: 06 August 2024; Label: Laneway Music; Formats: digital download, streaming | |

=== Singles ===
| Year | Title | Peak chart positions | Album |
| Year | Title | AUS | Album |
|---|---|---|---|
| 1985 | "Never Is"/"Crawfish" | - | non album single |
| 1986 | "Change" | 81 | Ready to Believe |
| 1987 | "Leave Me" | 39 | Ready to Believe |
| 1987 | "Rain" | 56 | Ready to Believe |
| 1987 | "Resurrection Shuffle" | 33 | Ready to Believe |
| 1988 | "Ready to Believe" | - | Ready to Believe |
| 1988 | "(It's Not a) Bad Life" | - | Ready to Believe |

== Awards and nominations ==
=== Countdown Australian Music Awards ===
Countdown was an Australian pop music TV series on national broadcaster ABC-TV from 1974 to 1987, it presented music awards from 1979 to 1987, initially in conjunction with magazine TV Week. The TV Week / Countdown Awards were a combination of popular-voted and peer-voted awards.

| Year | Nominee / work | Award | Result |
|---|---|---|---|
| 1986 | themselves | Most Promising New Talent | Nominated |
