= Hold, Hold, Fire =

Studio album by Calling All Cars
- Released: 12 March 2010
- Recorded: at Studios in the City, Melbourne
- Genre: Alternative rock
- Length: 35:07
- Label: Shock
- Producer: Tom Larkin

Calling All Cars chronology
Calling All Cars (2007)	Hold, Hold, Fire (2010)	Dancing With A Dead Man (2011)

Singles from Hold, Hold, Fire
- 1. "Not Like Anybody" Released: 15 June 2009; 2. "Hold, Hold, Fire" Released: 25 September 2009; 3. "Disconnect" Released: March 2010; 4. "Run Away" Released: July 2010

Hold, Hold, Fire is the debut studio album by Australian rock band Calling All Cars, released on 12 March 2010. Hold, Hold, Fire was nominated for Best Independent Hard Rock Or Punk Album at the AIR Awards of 2010.

== Track listing ==
All tracks are written by Calling All Cars.

Hold, Hold, Fire
No.	Title	Length
1.	"Disconnect"	3:22
2.	"Run Away"	3:30
3.	"Not Like Anybody"	3:17
4.	"Hold, Hold, Fire"	4:46
5.	"This Ship Will Sail Without You"	3:16
6.	"Soldier On"	3:26
7.	"Animal"	2:35
8.	"How Long"	3:27
9.	"Liar Liar Liar"	3:15
10.	"Accident Waiting"	3:21
11.	"Little Red Hands"	4:02

== Charts ==
Chart (2010)	Peak position
Australian ARIA Albums Chart	72

== Release history ==
Region	Date	Label	Format	Catalogue
Australia	12 March 2010	Shock	CD, Digital download	GAD001
