= Mojo (Ash Grunwald album) =

Studio album by Ash Grunwald
- Released: 30 August 2019
- Label: Bloodlines Music

Ash Grunwald chronology
Now (2015)	Mojo (2019)

Singles from Mojo
- 1. "Whispering Song" Released: 21 June 2019

Mojo is the ninth studio album by Australian blues musician Ash Grunwald. The album is Grunwald's first with the label Bloodlines Music, with whom he signed in 2019. The album was released on 30 August 2019 and peaked at number 40 on the ARIA Charts. Mojo was recorded in Los Angeles and in Australia and was produced by Brian Brinkerhoff, Carla Olson and Ash.

Upon release, Grunwald said: "At this point, Mojo represents a journey through my own valley of darkness, and out the other side into the fresh sunlit glory of optimism and positivity. This may sound like a cliché, but when you've lived it it feels very different." adding that "Mojo is a five year documentation of the twists and turns of a turbulent time in my life. It is my life's work up until this point".

== Reception ==
Professional ratings
Review scores
Source	Rating
Forte Magazine	3.5/5 stars

Thom Devereux from Forte Magazine said "This album is one I would recommend to those who are familiar with Chicago blues and are looking for an album filled with vibrant, clean guitar solos that scream for minutes, and grungy, deeply distorted rhythm guitars. This album’s guest appearances add something different to each track, without straying too far from this style of music."

Jeff Jenkins from Stack Magazine said "The record showcases an all-star cast... but Grunwald's deep, soulful tone is the star of the show."

Mojo was produced by Brian Brinkerhoff, Carla Olson, George Carpenter and Ash Grunwald.

== Track listing ==
No.	Title	Writer(s)	Length
1.	"Hammer" (featuring Terry Evans)		4:53
2.	"Ain't My Problem" (featuring The Teskey Brothers)		3:12
3.	"Waiting Around to Die" (featuring Joe Bonamassa, Josh Teskey and Ian Collard)		4:17
4.	"Whispering Voice" (featuring Kasey Chambers)		2:55
5.	"Human" (featuring Mahalia Barnes and Harry Angus James)	Jamie Hartman, Rory Graham	4:20
6.	"Trouble's Door" (featuring Mahalia Barnes and Kim Wilson)	Ash Grunwald	5:04
7.	"Mountain" (featuring Mahalia Barnes)		3:21
8.	"3am" (featuring Harry James Angus and Ian Collard)		4:36
9.	"How Many More Years" (featuring Eddy 'The Chief' Clearwater and Ian Collard)		5:05
10.	"Whipping Boy" (featuring Terry Evans)		3:33
11.	"The Boogie"		3:12
12.	"Goin' Out West" (featuring Kim Wilson)		3:50

== Charts ==
Chart (2019)	Peak position
Australian Albums (ARIA)	40

== Release history ==
Region	Date	Format	Edition(s)	Label	Catalogue
Australia	30 August 2019	CD; digital download; streaming	Standard	Bloodlines	BLOOD53
Australia	30 August 2019	Vinyl	Limited edition blue vinyl	Bloodlines	BLOODLP53
