= Way Out West (jazz group) =

- Origin: Western Melbourne
- Genre: Jazz
- Years active: 2001-current
- Label: Jazzhead
- Members: Peter Knight (trumpet), Dung Nguyen (modified electric guitar, traditional Vietnamese instruments), Paul Williamson (saxophone), Ray Pereira (percussion), Howard Cairns (acoustic bass), Rajiv Jayaweera (drum kit).
- Past members: Dave Beck (drum kit)
- Website: Myspace

Way Out West are an Australian jazz group, formed in 2001. They originated in the western suburbs of Melbourne and are noted for their unusual instrumentation which includes West African drumming, and many traditional Vietnamese string instruments such as a dan tranh, dan nguyet and dan bau.

The band has performed at major international festivals such as the Montreal Jazz Festival, Vancouver Jazz Festival, and Veneto Jazz Festival.

== Reception ==
Their second album, Old Grooves for New Streets (2007), received five star reviews in Australia, and a review by America's All About Jazz said, "Certainly a candidate for Best Release of the Year – I hope lots of ears hear this one!". In 2009 the group won the Bell Award for Australian Jazz Ensemble of the year. The Sydney Morning Herald observed, "That these exotic sounds blend so well with jazz is a mysterious Melbourne alchemy".

== Discography ==
=== Albums ===
Title	Details
Footscray Station	Released: 2003; Label: Newmarket Music (NEW3127.2); Format: CD
Old Grooves for New Streets	Released: 2007; Label: Jazzhead (HEAD085); Format: CD, DD
The Effects of Weather	Released: 2010; Label: Jazzhead (HEAD128); Format: CD, DD

== Awards and nominations ==
=== AIR Awards ===
The Australian Independent Record Awards (commonly known informally as AIR Awards) is an annual awards night to recognise, promote and celebrate the success of Australia's Independent Music sector.

Year	Nominee / work	Award	Result
2010	The Effects of the Weather	Best Independent Jazz Album	Nominated

== See also ==
- Peter Knight (musician)
