= Wendy Saddington =

Australian blues, soul and jazz singer (1949–2013)

- Saddington performing, 1970

Background information
- Also known as: Gandharvika Dasi
- Born: Wendy June Saddington; 26 September 1949; Melbourne, Australia
- Died: 21 June 2013 (aged 63) Melbourne, Australia
- Genres: Blues, soul, jazz
- Occupations: Singer, music journalist
- Instrument: Vocals
- Years active: 1967–2013
- Label: Festival

Wendy June Saddington (26 September 1949 – 21 June 2013), also known as Gandharvika Dasi, was an Australian blues, soul and jazz singer, and was in the bands Chain, Copperwine and the Wendy Saddington Band. She wrote for teen pop newspaper Go-Set from September 1969 to September 1970 as an agony aunt in her weekly "Takes Care of Business" column, and as a feature writer. Saddington had Top 30 chart success with her 1972 solo single "Looking Through a Window", which was written and produced by Billy Thorpe and Warren Morgan of the Aztecs. After adopting Krishna Consciousness in the 1970s she took the name Gandharvika Dasi. In March 2013 she was diagnosed with oesophageal cancer and died in June, aged 63.

== Biography ==
Wendy June Saddington was born on 26 September 1949 to Henry Saddington and Connie Evans. Henry was a bus driver and Connie was a raincoat maker. Wendy was the couple's only child and she grew up in Melbourne. At 13 she bought her first record, Stevie Wonder's With a Song in My Heart. After leaving school Saddington was a typist for a private detective, "just divorces and stuff like that". She quit after he objected to her dress sense and did not allow her a day off for Melbourne Show Day in September.

She attended a club venue in Carlton, the Love In, which had two singers and she thought: "Oh my god, I can sing better than that". Her inspirations were Nina Simone, Bessie Smith, Aretha Franklin and Bob Dylan. The following week at the Love In she asked if she could get up to sing, and promptly provided Bessie Smith songs and a Miriam Makeba song, "When I've Passed on". The management advised "you can sing here every week".

=== 1960s ===
Wendy Saddington started her professional musical career in 1967 when she joined as a singer for Melbourne-based soul band Revolution and then Adelaide-based psychedelic rock band James Taylor Move, with Kevin Peek on guitar (later in Sky), Trevor Spencer on drums and Alan Tarney on bass guitar. When Perth pop/R&B/blues group, The Beat 'n Tracks, relocated to Melbourne, Saddington joined and the group were renamed, The Chain, in December 1968. Saddington provided the name from Franklin's "Chain of Fools". The Chain line-up were Saddington on vocals, Phil Manning on guitar and vocals, Warren Morgan on piano and vocals, and Murray Wilkins on bass guitar.

The teen pop newspaper, Go-Set started publishing in 1966, and in 1968, as a guest writer, Saddington provided an interview of soul and blues singer, Max Merritt. In March 1969 Saddington was described by The Canberra Times's Garry Raffaele as "by far the best female rhythm and blues singer in the country. That's a relative judgment; objectively she is an exciting, raging swinger in the style of Aretha Franklin ... vocally she screams and roars and sighs with the rhythmic feel of [Franklin]". Saddington left the band in May that year prior to any known recordings, the band later shortened their name to Chain and had a hit with "Black and Blue". In June 1969 she explained to Go-Set readers "I only want to be in it up to my waist, not up to my neck ... My attitude was all wrong in the end. I didn't care if I turned up late or drunk for a job ... [the other band members] knew I was unhappy, but they were powerless ... it was the promoters who handed out the money and they're a pack of misers".

Go-Set had an advice column column, "Dear Leslie Pixie", initially written by Sue Flett and then by Jean Gollan. From September 1969 to September the following year, Saddington provided the weekly "Takes Care of Business" column in its stead, and was also a feature writer. In 2005 founder of Go-Set, Phillip Frazer, told listeners of 3CV radio, "[she] was so distinctive in her presentation ... she developed a cult following that included some of our gay female staff". He approved the idea of a "working class girl from the suburbs, giving advice to the kids". Australian music historian, David Martin Kent, said that in her column, "Saddington dealt with the realistic issues of pregnancy, loneliness, and sometimes suicide. Her approach was to focus on the reality of the teenagers' problems, and provide answers that met that reality head-on".

In 1969, Go-Set was the only Australian newspaper or magazine dealing with teen issues and culture. Rival newspapers attacked Saddington's direct approach, and parents, on talk-back radio, challenged her answers as not being aimed at the correct age group: "her readers were too young to understand the column". Saddington defended her writing with "Obviously some people can't face reality". In 2002 she recalled "one of the last things I wrote was that if they could talk more to their mothers then they wouldn't have to write to me".

According to Australian Broadcasting Corporation (ABC) TV show, Long Way to the Top (2001), "[Saddington] had a wild appearance with heavily made-up eyes, a huge afro, and usually wore copious beads and bangles, with a pair of Levis and a cheesecloth top". In an interview on ABC TV series, GTK in October 1969, she stated that some members of the public laughed at her appearance and even became abusive. She also expressed dissatisfaction with the superficiality of the pop scene which made success difficult.

=== 1970s ===
On the Australia Day weekend (24 and 25 January) 1970, Ourimbah was the venue for the "Pilgrimage for Pop", the nation's first rock music festival. Saddington performed as a solo artist, with other acts including Billy Thorpe & the Aztecs and Jeff St John's Copperwine. Julie Kusko from The Australian Women's Weekly estimated some 6000 to 10000 attendees "sat and watched, taking the long delays between poor performances without a murmur ... At night the music became better, and psychedelic lighting and colored searchlights helped. A couple of artists got standing ovations, surprisingly, for songs of the rock-'n-roll style of 15 years ago". Despite local predictions "that it would all turn into a drug and sex orgy", there was some nudity and drug use, but police only "laid four charges of indecency and ten for language and offensive behaviour".

From March 1970 to February 1971, Saddington was co-lead vocalist with St John in Copperwine. Saddington had previously interviewed St John for Go-Set after the singer, born with spina bifida, had performed on a TV show without his requested stool. Saddington had taken the TV station to task over St John being "forced to perform, propped precariously, on a slippery studio floor on [his] crutches". During Saddingtion's time the other members of Copperwine were Harry Brus on bass guitar, Ross East on guitar and vocals, Peter Figures on drums, and Barry Kelly on keyboards and vocals.

In January 1971, Copperwine attended the Wallacia Festival, in central New South Wales, and recorded a live album without leader, St John. It was released as Wendy Saddington and Copperwine Live but Saddington had left before its release in February by Festival Records on their Infinity label. Saddington was not pleased with the quality of the live album. Nevertheless, Australian musicologist, Ian McFarlane, felt her tenure with Copperwine had "motivated many changes in [their] musical direction, with much of the soul-copying being replaced by a more purist blues-oriented sound. That change was heard on the album".

In July 1971, Saddington released her debut solo single, "Looking Through a Window", which reached No. 22 in September. It was co-written and co-produced by Billy Thorpe and her former bandmate, Warren Morgan of the Aztecs. The Aztecs, including Morgan and Thorpe, backed her on the recording. Soon after, Saddington formed Teardrop which were featured in an 11-minute documentary short for Film Australia, Australian Colour Diary No. 43: Three Directions in Australian Pop Music (1972) directed by Peter Weir. Chart success for "Looking Through a Window" led Festival to re-release the Copperwine album as Looking Through a Window with the single added as a bonus track in 1972.

From October 1972 to the end of 1974 Saddington regularly supported Sydney drag performance troupe, Sylvia and the Synthetics, which had various members including Danny Abood (a.k.a. Daniel Archer), Doris Fish (a.k.a. Philip Mills) and Jacqueline Hyde (a.k.a. Mel Slatterly). A discussion with Saddington had provided the name, "I was with [her] one night on our way to 'Chez Ivy's' and we just started talking about names for groups. You know, raging along and we suddenly hit on Sylvia ... and 'Synthetics' just seemed to go so well". Chez Ivy's was a wine bar in Bondi Junction which was frequented in the 1970s by gays and lesbians. Sylvia and the Synthetic's history "paralleled the early years of the gay rights movement" in Oxford Street, Sydney.

In March 1973, The Who's rock opera Tommy was performed as an orchestral version in Australia with Saddington in the role of The Nurse. Other Australian artists were Daryl Braithwaite (as Tommy), Billy Thorpe, Doug Parkinson, Broderick Smith, Jim Keays, Colleen Hewett, Linda George, Ross Wilson, Bobby Bright, and Ian Meldrum (as Uncle Ernie in Sydney).

From the early 1970s Saddington was a follower of Prabhupada and joined the International Society for Krishna Consciousness, she took the name, Gandharvika Dasi. She had been introduced to the movement in 1972 when visiting New York. In the mid-1970s Saddington worked with various groups including Shango and Blues Assembly, and in New York with Jeffrey Crozier Band. Her performing career declined in the late 1970s as her involvement with Krishna Consciousness became a major focus.

=== 1980s–2000s ===
In 1983 Wendy Saddington returned to her music career by forming the Wendy Saddington Band with Bobby Gebert on keyboards, Harvey James (ex-Ariel, Sherbet, Swanee) on guitar, Billy Rylands on bass guitar, and Chris Sweeney on drums. A second version appeared in 1986 to 1987 with Angelica Booth on bass guitar, Rose Bygrave (ex-Goanna) on keyboards, Mick Lieber (ex-Python Lee Jackson) on guitar and Des McKenna ("Animal" from Hey Hey It's Saturday house band) on drums. This line-up mainly played reggae music and toured rural New South Wales including Tamworth. They recorded an album at Tamworth's ENREC studios, which was not released as the master tapes were lost.

In August 1994, Australian art historian Catriona Moore dedicated her book, Indecent Exposures. Twenty Years of Australian Feminist Photography to photographer Carol Jerrems and used Jerrems' photo, "Wendy Saddington 1973", to promote the work. On 5 September 1998 Saddington provided guest vocals on One Night Jamm by Kevin Borich Express, which also has guest vocals and harmonica by Ross Wilson. The band's line up was Kevin Borich on lead guitar and vocals, his son Lucius Borich on drums, and Ben Rosen on bass guitar. Saddington "sang a number of jazzy, free-form blues tunes".

Around 1985 Saddington had formed a duo with pianist Peter Head, performing mainly at the Civic Hotel and at various Kings Cross and Darlinghurst venues. They worked irregularly together for the remainder of the decade. In 2002 Head organised a Saddington concert at Sydney's jazz and blues venue, The Basement, curating a soul/jazz lineup with Lachlan Doley on Hammond organ, Peter Figures on drums, and Jackie Orszaczky on bass guitar. The concert was recorded but is as yet unreleased.

In 2003, Saddington provided three tracks for the album, Women 'n Blues, with other tracks by Kate Dunbar, Sally King, Jeannie Lewis and Margaret Roadknight. In August 2012 Saddington appeared on celebrity musician quiz show, RocKwiz, on SBS-TV, where she performed Simone's "Backlash Blues". In December that year she recalled her career "I'm not into legacies ... I usually get a job once in a blue moon ... I guess it is by choice in a way. But at the same time I have always thought I would have liked to have earned a living at it". She believed that Krishna Consciousness had "saved my life", reviewing her life as a heavy drinker "I honestly think if I had gone on with that, it would have ended up like Janis Joplin. Too fast; not good enough; too soon, you know, bang". She was diagnosed in March 2013 with oesophageal cancer and died on 21 June 2013, aged 63, at her home in Albert Park, Melbourne.

== Awards and nominations ==
=== Go-Set Pop Poll ===
The Go-Set Pop Poll was coordinated by teen-oriented pop music newspaper, Go-Set and was established in February 1966 and conducted an annual poll during 1966 to 1972 of its readers to determine the most popular personalities.

Year	Nominee / work	Award	Result
1969	herself	Female Vocal	4th
1970	herself	Female Vocal	2nd
1971	herself	Best Girl Vocal	4th
1972	herself	Female artist	4th
