= Calling All Cars (band) =

Australian rock band

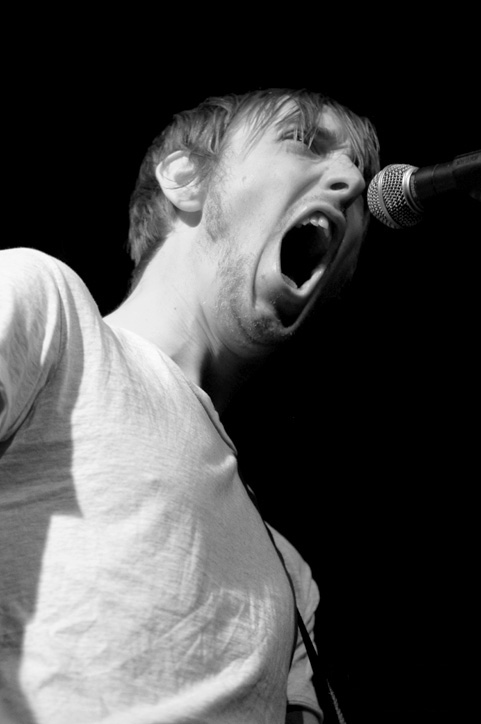

Background information
- Origin: Melbourne, Victoria
- Genres: Alternative rock
- Years active: 2005–present
- Label: Cooking Vinyl Australia
- Members: Haydn Ing; James Ing; Adam Montgomery
- Past members: Matt Lonergan
- Website: http://www.facebook.com/callingallcarsmusic

Calling All Cars is an Australian Alternative rock band from Melbourne, Victoria and consists of brothers Haydn and James Ing, along with Adam Montgomery. The band have been heavily touring for the past 10 years, released 3 acclaimed albums and have received considerable rotation on Australian radio, including 'album of the week' on Triple J.

The band was named after The Sopranos episode, "Calling All Cars"

== History ==
=== 2005–2009: Beginnings ===
Calling All Cars formed in 2005 with brothers Haydn and James Ing and friend Matt Lonergan, who was eventually replaced with Adam Montgomery. Haydn and James grew up in Narooma, New South Wales before moving permanently to Melbourne.

The band gradually progressed through live performances with acts like Cog and The Butterfly Effect on national tours. Their first big stadium show was supporting Green Day in Auckland, New Zealand. They have also played many Australian music festivals including the Melbourne Big Day Out in Jan 2010 and were selected to open 11 shows alongside Wolfmother for AC/DC on the Australian leg of their Black Ice World Tour in Feb-March 2010.

=== 2009–2010:Hold, Hold, Fire ===
The band recorded their first album with producer Tom Larkin, the drummer from Shihad. They recorded in his Melbourne studio throughout 2009 and early 2010. The debut album, titled Hold, Hold, Fire, was released on 12 March 2010. They released the single "Hold, Hold, Fire", the title track from the album, in 2009 along with undertaking their own Go Hunting Tour.

Prior to the release, Calling All Cars had three singles from the album in high-rotation on Triple J. Sept-Dec 2010 saw Calling All Cars tour Hold, Hold, Fire nationally as well as support Scottish rock band Biffy Clyro

=== 2011–2012: Dancing with a Dead Man ===
In March 2011 Calling All Cars supported Queens of the Stone Age on their brief Australian Tour. In April 2011 the band entered the studio with producer Tom Larkin to record their second album. On 1 May 2011 the band released "Reptile" the first single of Dancing with a Dead Man. On 14 June 2011 the band released a statement saying their new album will be titled 'Dancing with a Dead Man'

On 5 August Calling All Cars released Dancing with a Dead Man the album debuted on the national album ARIA Charts at no. 20. This is the band's highest debut to date. The album was also awarded feature album on Triple J

In November 2011, Calling All Cars supported Foo Fighters on their 'Wasting Light' tour, where they made a short promo video with actor Jack Black (Tenacious D) and various members of Foo Fighters and Fucked Up

In January 2012, Calling All Cars joined the Big Day Out tour, playing all dates on the east coast. However, during the bands Sydney BDO set, lead singer Haydn Ing was knocked to the ground by a rowdy fan involved in the crowd. The blow left him unconscious and as a result, the band could not finish their set. It was later reported that Ing regained consciousness in the ambulance and was pleading for the driver to turn around so he could finish the show.

On 21 February Calling All Cars announced a national tour in support of their new single "She's Delirious". The tour saw the band play their biggest headlines shows to date. Support bands were Strangers from Sydney and Arts Martial from Perth opened all shows.

The band last show in for 2012 was in July. As of October 2012, no one had heard from the band for some time. There had been some speculation that they may have relocated to London to write and record their 3rd album.

=== 2013–present: Raise the People ===
The band spent most of 2013 working on their 3rd studio album. On 21 August 2013, the band released the song "Raise The People" on their official YouTube page and on 2 September, they released their first official single "Werewolves", The band toured with Kingswood on the "Life's a Beach" tour, from December 2013 through to January 2014.

In January 2014, the band released their second single "Standing in the Ocean" from the album Raise the People' which was released 7 March 2014. In May 2014, the band released their third single "Good God!"

The band relocated to London, UK, where they spent the rest of the year touring the world, including playing shows at The Great Escape (Brighton, UK), Camden Rocks (London, UK), CMJ Festival (NYC, USA), Sonisphere Festival (UK), Nouvelle Prague Festival (Prague, Czech Republic), Nightmare Festival (London, UK) and touring Nationally with Biffy Clyro (Australia).

On 26 September 2014, the band released their fourth single "Every Day Is The Same", which included live tracks from their triple j Live at the Wireless performance.

It is said that the band have now relocated back to Australia, where they are working on their fourth studio album.

== Discography ==
=== Studio albums ===
List of studio albums, with selected chart positions
Title	Album details	Peak chart positions
Title	Album details	AUS
Hold, Hold, Fire	Released: 12 March 2010; Label: Shock (GAD001)	72
Dancing with a Dead Man	Released: 5 August 2011; Label: Shock (DEAD001)	20
Raise the People	Released: 7 March 2014; Label: Cooking Vinyl Australia (CVLP007)	26

=== Extended plays ===
List of Extended Plays
Title	Details
Calling All Cars	Released: 3 November 2007; Label: Calling All Cars; Format: CD, DD
Animal	Released: August 2008; Label: Universal (1780559); Format: CD, DD

== Awards and nominations ==
=== AIR Awards ===
The Australian Independent Record Awards (commonly known informally as AIR Awards) is an annual awards night to recognise, promote and celebrate the success of Australia's Independent Music sector.

Year	Nominee / work	Award	Result
2010	Hold, Hold, Fire	Best Independent Hard Rock/Punk Album	Nominated
2012	Dancing with a Dead Man	Best Independent Hard Rock or Punk Album	Nominated

=== APRA Awards ===
The APRA Awards are presented annually from 1982 by the Australasian Performing Right Association (APRA), "honouring composers and songwriters". They commenced in 1982.

Year	Nominee / work	Award	Result	Ref.
2012	"Reptile" (Writers: Haydn Ing / James Ing / Adam Montgomery / Tom Larkin)	Song of the Year	Shortlisted	
