= The Sunny Cowgirls =

Australian country music group

- Origin: Hamilton, Victoria, Australia
- Genres: Country
- Years active: 2005–present
- Labels: Compass Bros. MSI; Phantom Sound and Vision
- Members: Sophie Clabburn; Celeste Clabburn
- Website: www.sunnycowgirls.com.au

The Sunny Cowgirls is an Australian country music group formed in 2005. They have released a total of seven studio albums since 2005. Their debut album, Little Bit Rusty, was released in 2005. Their latest album, Here We Go, was released in September 2016.

== Biography ==
The Sunny Cowgirls, Sophie and Celeste Clabburn, grew up on a farm in Hamilton, Victoria. The Clabburn sisters were raised on "Sunninghill", the family farm at Dunkeld near Hamilton, Victoria, before the whole family moved to Perth, Western Australia when they were primary school kids. Their farm was in their father's family a long while, and that's where they came up with the name "Sunny". After four years of working around the country and doing the occasional gig, they raised enough cash to approach well-known Perth record producer Mark Donohoe to showcase their writing and music.

The Cowgirls lives and careers changed in early 2005 when they secured places as aspiring artists in the CMAA College of Country Music, held before the Tamworth Country Music Festival each year. They then signed with Compass Bros Records and their first album, Little Bit Rusty, reached No. 4 on the ARIA country charts.

The Sunny Cowgirls have also collaborated with Adam Brand on "Someday".

On 1 September 2012 The Sunny Cowgirls performed at the 25th Trundle Bush Tucker Day.

== Discography ==
=== Studio albums ===
List of studio albums, with selected details chart positions
Title	Album details	Peak chart positions	
Title	Album details	AUS	AUS Country
Little Bit Rusty	Release date: 18 April 2005; Label: Compass Bros.; Format: CD, download	80	4
Long Five Days	Release date: 28 August 2006; Label: Compass Bros.; Format: CD, download	93	7
Dust Will Settle	Release date: 2 August 2008; Label: Compass Bros.; Format: CD, download	37	2
Summer	Release date: 15 January 2010; Label: Compass Bros.; Format: CD, download	33	3
What We Do	Release date: 11 January 2013; Label: WJO Distribution; Format: CD, download	42	2
My Old Man	Release date: 29 August 2014; Label: WJO Distribution; Format: CD, download	85	12
Here We Go	Release date: 30 September 2016; Label: ABC Music, Universal Music Australia; Format: CD, download	13	3
Happy Days	Release date: 20 September 2019; Label: ABC Music, Universal Music Australia; Format: CD, download	0 unk	0 unk

=== Live albums ===
List of live albums, with selected details
Title	Album details
The Sunny Cowgirls	Release date: January 2009 (DVD); Label: Compass Brothers; Format: DVD
Live Wires: Live in Concert	Release date: 2 December 2011 (DVD) and 17 February 2012 (CD); Label: WJO Distribution; Format: DVD, CD

=== Singles ===
List of singles, with selected chart positions
Year	Title	Album
2005	"Rousy's Life"	Little Bit Rusty
2005	"Little Bit Rusty"	Little Bit Rusty
2006	"Six Pack Short"	Long Five Days
2007	"Still Circling"	Long Five Days
2007	"Cuttin' Up B&S Style"	Long Five Days
2007	"Dry Land Crop"	Long Five Days
2008	"Acting Stupid"	Dust Will Settle
2008	"Dancing on the Darling"	Dust Will Settle
2009	"Grog Monster"	Dust Will Settle
2010	"Summer"	Summer
2010	"Naughty Side"	Summer
2012	"Good Spot Here"	Summer
2012	"Green and Gold"	What We Do
2013	"Kids Forever"	What We Do

=== Music videos ===
Year	Video
2005	"Rousy's Life"
2005	"Little Bit Rusty"
2008	"Acting Stupid"
2008	"Dancing on the Darling"
2009	"Summer"
2010	"Naughty Side"
2012	"Green And Gold"
2016	"Cowboy"
2016	"Dam Fun"
2017	"Rev It Up"

== Awards and nominations ==
=== AIR Awards ===
The Australian Independent Record Awards (commonly known informally as AIR Awards) is an annual awards night to recognise, promote and celebrate the success of Australia's Independent Music sector.

Year	Nominee / work	Award	Result
2010	Summer	Best Independent Country Album	Nominated
2013	What We Do	Best Independent Country Album	Nominated

=== Country Music Awards of Australia ===
The Country Music Awards of Australia (CMAA) (also known as the Golden Guitar Awards) is an annual awards night held in January during the Tamworth Country Music Festival, celebrating recording excellence in the Australian country music industry. They have been held annually since 1973.

Year	Nominee / work	Award	Result
2011	The Sunny Cowgirls	Horizon Award	Won

- Note: wins only
