= Fish Out of Water (Ash Grunwald album) =

Studio album by Ash Grunwald
- Released: August 2008
- Studio: The Container, Delta Groove HQ
- Genre: Blues; rock
- Label: Delta Groove
- Producer: Countbounce (aka Pip Norman); Ash Grunwald

Ash Grunwald chronology
Live from the Factory (2008)	Fish Out of Water (2008)	Live at the Fly by Night (2010)

Fish Out of Water is the fourth studio album by Australian blues musician Ash Grunwald. It was released in August 2008 and peaked at number 43, becoming Grunwald's first album to chart inside the ARIA Charts top 50.

At the ARIA Music Awards of 2009, the album was nominated for Best Blues and Roots Album.

At the APRA Awards of 2010 "Breakout" won "Blues & Roots Work of the Year"

== Background and release ==
Ash Grunwald attended a label-initiated songwriters day at Michael Gudinski's house in Victoria's Macedon Ranges and was teamed with hip-hop artist, Pip Norman (from TZU) and the duo wrote the album's title track, described by Shane Fowles from The Standard as "an uplifting blues gospel tune", in a day.

Grunwald said "It's a songwriting exercise that Mushroom put on with their songwriters, they do it every couple of years and it's a bit of a tradition out at Gudinski's house. You get there early and they make breakfast for you, everything is taken care of, and I turned up there and Pip and I just started jamming. He made this beat on his laptop and I played my guitar, and that became the song "Fish Out of Water." Grunwald asked Norman to write more with him and sharing credits on five tracks and production co-credit.

== Reception ==
Shane Fowles from The Standard said "Like a merging of the old and the new, the result [of the co-producing by Grunwald and Norman] is a melding of blues bass-lines, ripping riffs and hip-hop influenced backbeats." adding "There are grunge elements on opener 'Can U Find a Way', smooth funk on 'Get What You Want' and some soulful, acoustic numbers that temper the digital assault. Grunwald loses the annoying air of earnestness to show that modern-day blues can do more than tip the hat to the old masters."

Andrew Rudge from The Dwarf said "There is a range of styles in the songs on this album from the chain gang industrial sound of 'Can U Find a Way' to the slow acoustic gospel of 'Give Something Away', sung with a preachers desperation. There is range of emotions in the songs too, from the fast paced fun and funk of 'Mojo' to the dark relationship regrets within 'The Devil Called Me a Liar'."

== Track listing ==
Standard edition
No.	Title	Writer(s)	Length
1.	"Can U Find a Way"	Ash Grunwald	4:07
2.	"Mojo"	Grunwald, Pip Norman	3:14
3.	"Fish Out of Water"	Grunwald, Norman	3:28
4.	"Give Something Away"	Grunwald	3:07
5.	"The Devil Called Me a Liar"	Grunwald	4:09
6.	"Joke On Me"	Grunwald, Norman	3:11
7.	"Breakout"	Grunwald	4:27
8.	"Working Hard"	Grunwald	2:32
9.	"The Bottle"	Grunwald	3:58
10.	"Get What You Want"	Grunwald, Mark Pearl, Norman	3:10
11.	"Port Campbell"	Grunwald	5:36
12.	"Shake"	Grunwald	4:07

== Charts ==
Chart (2008)	Peak position
Australian Albums (ARIA)	43

== Release history ==
Region	Date	Format	Edition(s)	Label	Catalogue
Australia	August 2008	CD	Standard	Delta Groove	DG04
Australia	22 February 2019	CD; Digital Download; Streaming	Reissue	Bloodlines Records	BLOOD36
