= Tamara Saulwick =

Australian artist

- Born: 12 November 1966 (age 59); Melbourne, Australia
- Education: PhD, Performance Studies - Victoria University (2016), Master's degree in Animateuring/cross-modal performance - Victorian College of the Arts (2001), B.Ed in Drama, Dance & Design - Victoria College, Rusden (1986-1989), Graduate of The John Bolton Theatre School (1991)
- Known for: Performance, Theatre, Direction, Sound art Artistic Director
- Website: http://tamarasaulwick.com

Tamara Saulwick is a performance-maker, director and dramaturge from Melbourne, Australia. She makes contemporary performance pieces for theatres and public spaces. Since 2017 she has had the role of Artistic Director of Melbourne arts company Chamber Made, who are creators of original works at the meeting point of sound, music and performance.

She is now the company's Artistic Director and Co-CEO. Her works for the company include Diaspora (Melbourne International Arts Festival, 2019), Dragon Ladies Don't Weep (Asia TOPA, 2020), SYSTEM_ERROR (Arts House, 2021) and My Self in That Moment (The Substation, 2022), which between them received several APRA AMCOS Art Music Awards and Green Room Awards and nominations. In August 2025 she curated Listening Acts, a program of six sound installations and three live performances at the Melbourne Recital Centre for the Now or Never festival, the company's first collaboration with the festival and a move into curatorial work.

== Early career ==
Saulwick has a number of film and television acting credits including Nirvana Street Murder (1990) and TV show The Games in 1998.

Saulwick was a founding member of outdoor performance companies, The Hunting Party and Strange Fruit, with which she toured in Europe and Central America through the early 1990s. She worked as a core artist with Neil Cameron Productions from 1993 to 1999, assisting in the direction of large-scale outdoor community performance events. In 2016 Saulwick completed her doctorate on dramaturgies of sound in live performance at Victoria University.

In 1997 and 1999 Saulwick worked in Vienna with Austrian actor Justus Neumann on two productions, Don Quixote and Die Bibel im Lusthaus Zu Wein. From 1998 to 2008 Saulwick worked as an actor and collaborator with Not Yet It's Difficult, an interdisciplinary arts company led by David Pledger.

Saulwick was a member of the Melbourne Playback Theatre Company from 2005 to 2011. She took part regularly in performances integrating improvisation and storytelling.

Early pieces that influenced Saulwick's future direction include 2005's Imprint and 2001's Map Folding for Beginners.

== Career ==
Saulwick's creative practice explores themes of communication, exploring how people connect with each other through confrontation and negotiation. Her work incorporates technological elements including mobile, digital and analogue.

Pin Drop won multi Green Room Awards. This solo work was first shown at Arts House in 2010 and explored sensations to do with fear and a woman's sense of threat from a stranger in a variety of contexts. In 2011 this piece played at the Malthouse Theatre. It then toured Australia in 2012 with Mobile States In 2013 Pin Drop was adapted for ABC Radio National With Peter Knight. Featuring in a schedule of Australian contemporary performance and dance, there was a presentation of this piece in 2014 at acclaimed arts venue Tramway, Glasgow, UK.

In 2013 Saulwick created PUBLIC. This was an audio performance piece created for the Big West Festival in Maribyrnong, Victoria. It explored clashes between public and private behaviour in a busy food court section of a shopping centre.

In 2015 Saulwick created a piece called Endings, which incorporated portable record players, reel-to-reel recorders and live performers, Saulwick, folk singer Paddy Mann (AKA Grand Salvo) and Peter Knight. It was created to explore the ways people engage with death. Co-funded by Melbourne's Arts House and Performance Space in Eveleigh, Sydney, it was premiered at Sydney Festival in 2015, following this there was a season at Melbourne's Arts House.

In 2016 Saulwick directed Permission to Speak for Chamber Made Opera with composer Kate Neal. The piece explores the relationship between parents and their children as it evolves through a lifetime and features contemporary performance, musical composition for voices, with layered edits from interviews. Permission to Speak won the 2017 APRA/AMCOS Art Music Award for Victorian Performance of the Year and was nominated for Choral/Vocal Work of The Year. Saulwick and Neal were interviewed about this piece on the New Waves Podcast and its production was featured in a Community Broadcasting Association of Australia (CBAA) documentary broadcast on 14 October 2016.

In 2016 Saulwick was commissioned to create Newport Archives by The Substation, an arts centre situated in Newport, Victoria in a converted industrial building. This 40 minute experience is a permanent piece in which participants listen to a guided walk using an mp3 player.

In February 2017 Saulwick became Artistic Director at Chamber Made Opera.

In 2017 Endings was performed in Canada, Great Britain (at the Brighton Festival) and Ireland (at the Dublin Theatre Festival), and played again in Canada at PuSh International Performing Arts Festival, January 2018 and America in February 2018 at On The Boards in Seattle. Endings won multiple award nominations (for a Helpmann Award for 'Best New Australian Work' and a Green Room Award for best 'Contemporary & Experimental Performance') and received a Green Room Award for 'Design and Realisation'. In 2016 Saulwick and her collaborator, the composer Peter Knight adapted Endings for ABC Radio National's Soundproof.

Another significant work is Alter, which is a performance using a constructed sound and light installation featuring 16 iPads (each participant used an iPad during the performance). The piece was commissioned for the Festival of Live Art by Arts House. Saulwick used a residency at Blast Theory, Portslade, Brighton and Hove, UK in September 2015 to develop this work. There was an element of the brief encouraging artists to make work with a low environmental impact. This piece will be touring in China for one month in 2018.

== Projects with Peter Knight ==
Saulwick also works extensively with her partner, Peter Knight, who is an internationally renowned composer, musician and artistic director of Australian Art Orchestra. Together they have made a number of works: Pin Drop, which won a Green Room Award in 2010 for Outstanding Production in Alternative and Hybrid Performance and was nominated for Best Composition and Sound Design. The pair was also commissioned by the ABC to turn this project into a radiophonic work

Pin Drop toured Australia and also played in Glasgow at Tramway.

Seddon Archives was a headphone audio walk commissioned by Big West Festival. Endings which won a 2016 Green Room Award and toured through 2017-18 to Canadian Stage (Toronto), Brighton Festival (UK), Dublin Theatre Festival, pUsh Festival Vancouver and On the Boards (Seattle). The ABC commissioned a radiophonic version of Endings in 2016.

== Publications ==
In December 2014 a transcript of a conversation on the topic of performance and technology between Suzanne Kersten, David Pledger, Julian Rickert, Tamara Saulwick, Hellen Sky, Gorkem Acaroglu and Glennat D’Cruz at the Mechanics Institute, Brunswick, on Saturday 3 November 2013 entitled Working with technology/making technology work: A round table discussion was published in Australasian Drama Studies, Issue 65

2014 also saw the publishing of Pin Drop: A live work for solo performer and 11 voices, her contribution to a collection of essays called ‘Testimony, Witness, Authority: The politics and poetics of experience.'

=== Academic achievements ===
Saulwick has a PhD in performance studies from Victoria University (2016), a master's degree in Animateuring/cross-modal performance from the Victorian College of the Arts (2001), a B.Ed. in drama, dance & design from Victoria College, Rusden (1986-1989) and is a graduate of The John Bolton Theatre School (1991).

== Nominations and awards ==
=== Victorian Green Room Awards ===
- 2016: Best Sound Performance nomination – Permission to Speak (Chamber Made Opera)
- 2015: Design and Realisation Award- Endings
- 2015: Best Contemporary Performance nomination – Endings
- 2013: Outstanding Hybrid Work nomination – PUBLIC
- 2010: Outstanding Production Award – Pin Drop
- 2010: Sound Design and Composition nomination – Pin Drop
- 2010: Mise-en-scene nomination – Pin Drop
- 2010: Production Design nomination – Pin Drop

=== Helpmann Awards ===
- 2015: Best New Australian Work nomination - Endings

=== APRA/AMCOS Art Music Awards ===
- 2016: Vocal/choral work of the year nomination - Permission to Speak (Chamber Made Opera)
- 2016: Victorian performance of the year Award- Permission to Speak (Chamber Made Opera)

== Grants and Commissions ==
=== Fellowships and professional development grants ===
- 2017: Australia council grant for attendance at International Symposium for Performing Arts (New York)
- 2015/2016: Australia Council Theatre Fellowship
- 2007: Australia council grant to train with Siti Company (New York)
- 2006: Arts Victoria grant for participation in Time_Place_Space_5 (QUT)
- 2003: Australia Council grant for residency with Dah Teater (Belgrade)

=== Residencies ===
- 2017 - Vitalstatistix – Adelaide. Incubator artist residency with Nicola Gunn
- 2017 - Banff centre for the Arts, Canada. Artist residency
- 2016 - Blast Theory Artist Residency (Brighton, UK)
