= Give Signs =

Studio album by Ash Grunwald
- Released: 28 August 2006
- Studio: Delta Groove Studios
- Genre: Blues; rock
- Label: Delta Groove
- Producer: Ash Grunwald

Ash Grunwald chronology
Live at the Corner (2005)	Give Signs (2006)	Live from the Factory (2008)

Give Signs is the third studio album by Australian blues musician Ash Grunwald, released in August 2006. It was his first album recorded on his own label, Delta Groove Records, and became Grunwald's first album to chart on the ARIA Charts, peaking at number 84.

At the ARIA Music Awards of 2007, the album was nominated for Best Blues and Roots Album.

== Track listing ==
Standard edition
No.	Title	Length
1.	"Serious"	2:53
2.	"Skywriter"	3:14
3.	"Give Signs"	2:54
4.	"Money"	3:50
5.	"Take the Drop"	4:12
6.	"Think Tank"	4:18
7.	"Situation"	4:20
8.	"Come On Strong"	3:24
9.	"Do It Now"	3:51
10.	"Don't Worry"	4:00
11.	"Bottled Thunder"	5:29
12.	"Opinion"	4:00

Limited edition bonus DVD
No.	Title	Length
1.	"Just Be Yourself"
2.	"Jesus Gonna Be Here"
3.	"Take the Drop"
4.	"Don't Worry"
5.	"Serious"
6.	"Thinktank"
7.	"Give Signs"
8.	"Skywriter"
9.	"Dolphin Song"

== Charts ==
Chart (2006)	Peak position
Australian Albums (ARIA)	84

== Release history ==
Region	Date	Format	Edition(s)	Label	Catalogue
Australia	28 August 2006	CD	Standard	Delta Groove	DG04
Australia	28 August 2006	CD + DVD	Limited Edition	Delta Groove	DG04
