= Now (Ash Grunwald album) =

Studio album by Ash Grunwald
- Released: 25 September 2015
- Label: Delta Groove; Bloodlines; Shock
- Producer: Nick Didia

Ash Grunwald chronology
Gargantua (2013)	Now (2015)	Mojo (2019)

Now is the eighth studio album by Australian blues musician Ash Grunwald. The album was released in September 2015, peaking at number 52 on the ARIA Charts.

Grunwald called it a "modern psychedelic, sci-fi, swamp rock, blues album, if there is such a thing".

== Reception ==
Professional ratings
Review scores
Source	Rating
Stuff NZ	4/5 stars

Colin Morris from Stuff NZ said "Aimed squarely at the blues market that think it's simply 12 bars and an electric guitar, Grunwald wants you on the dancefloor screamin' shoutin' and crunching the beats underfoot. I love, even though at parts it's overblown, the sheer swagger of this disc. It's got a big heart mixed into a big sound."

== Track listing ==
Standard edition
No.	Title	Length
1.	"River"	3:59
2.	"It Don't Belong to You"	3:58
3.	"Evening"	4:37
4.	"Jack"	4:32
5.	"Open Country"	4:49
6.	"In the Middle"	4:03
7.	"The Worst Crimes Are Legal"	4:47
8.	"Second Guess"	4:29
9.	"Ramblin'"	4:26
10.	"Send Me"	2:46
11.	"The Least Among Us"	5:42

== Charts ==
Chart (2015)	Peak position
Australian Albums (ARIA)	52

== Release history ==
Region	Date	Format	Edition(s)	Label	Catalogue
Australia	25 September 2015	CD; DD	Standard	Delta Groove / Bloodlines / Shock Records	DG12
Australia	22 February 2019	CD; Digital Download; Streaming; Vinyl	Reissue	Bloodlines Records	BLOOD41
