= Phil Manning (musician) =

Australian blues singer-songwriter and guitarist (born 1948)

- Born: Philip John Manning; 1948 (age 77–78); Devonport, Tasmania, Australia
- Genres: Blues, blues rock
- Occupation: Musician
- Instruments: Vocals, guitar, slide guitar
- Years active: 1966–present
- Labels: Mushroom/Festival, Tamborine, Blackmarket, Indigo, Polydor, Full Moon, Astor
- Website: www.philmanning.com.au

Philip John Manning (born 1948) is an Australian blues singer-songwriter and guitarist. Manning has been a member of various groups including Chain and has a successful solo career. As a member of Chain, Manning co-wrote their January 1971 single "Black and Blue" which became number one on the Melbourne charts and also Judgement, which reached number two in Sydney. The related album, Toward the Blues followed in September and peaked in the top 10 albums chart.

== Biography ==
=== Early years ===
Philip John Manning was born in Devonport, Tasmania in 1948. He has a brother Dennis Manning who is also a musician. Phil Manning's early bands were Anonymous Incorporated and Cocaine Spell – he was in the latter with drummer, Charlie Watts The Tasmanian one), and the pianist, John A. Bird. Manning moved to Melbourne in late 1966 and joined Tony Worsley and The Blue Jays, replacing Vince Melouney (ex-Billy Thorpe & the Aztecs) on guitar.

Bay City Union were an electric blues band, which had formed in Brisbane and relocated to Melbourne in December 1966. Manning joined on guitar, and played alongside Glenn Wheatley on guitar and Matt Taylor on vocals and harmonica. Manning left by 1968 to join the Laurie Allen Revue (see Bobby & Laurie).

=== Chain ===
Late in 1968, Manning joined The Beat 'n Tracks (originally from Perth) and in December the group were in Melbourne and recruited Wendy Saddington (ex-James Taylor Move) on vocals. They changed their name to The Chain and later to Chain to provide electric blues-rock. Chain have had numerous line-up changes and hiatuses, their most famous line-up are Manning and Taylor with Barry Harvey on drums and Barry Sullivan on bass guitar (both ex-Thursday's Children, Wild Cherries).

Chain's January 1971 single, "Black and Blue" reached the top 20 on the Australian Kent Music Report Singles Chart. Manning co-wrote the song with fellow members Harvey, Sullivan and Taylor. They had a second top 40 hit with "Judgement" issued in July. Also in July, teen newspaper, Go-Set published its annual popularity poll and Manning was voted at No. 3 for 'Best Guitarist'. The related Chain album, Toward the Blues followed in September and peaked in the top 10 on the Albums Chart. Manning has returned to Chain periodically for performances and further recordings, while contemporaneously maintaining his solo career.

=== Other bands and solo work ===
Manning left Chain in July 1971 to work with Warren Morgan (ex-Chain, Billy Thorpe & the Aztecs) on keyboards in a band called Pilgrimage. They issued a single, "Walk in the Light" in November and supported United Kingdom progressive rock group, Pink Floyd, in September and pop artist, Elton John, in October. He briefly returned to Chain from November for three months before joining Leo de Castro's Friends. In April 1972, Manning formed Willy & the Philtones which was renamed Band of Talabene in July with Tony Buettel on drums, Phil Gaunt on bass guitar and Tony Naylor on guitar. In December he joined Mighty Mouse which at various times included Harvey, Sullivan, Ian Clyne on keyboards, and Mal Capewell on sax and flute. By February 1973, Mighty Mouse was renamed as Chain (their 15th line-up) and Manning left by July 1974.

In December 1974, Manning released his debut solo album, I Wish There Was a Way, on Mushroom Records and Festival Records. Australian music historian, Ian McFarlane, described the album as in a "mellow, reflective singer/songwriter mode". The album spawned two singles, "Love Is the Mender" in December and "I Wish There Was a Way" in March 1975. In May, he formed the Phil Manning Band with Greg Cook on guitar and synthesiser (ex-Cam-Pact, Mándu Band), Bruce Devenish on drums and Eddie McDonald on bass guitar (ex-Bakery). They recorded the pop single "Train to Ride" which was issued in October. However, in September the line-up had changed to Steve Cooney on guitar, Tony Doyle on drums and Paul Wheeler on bass guitar (ex-Billy Thorpe and the Aztecs, MacKenzie Theory). The group disbanded in March 1977 and Manning joined John Paul Young's backing band the Allstars for three months.

In July 1977 he formed Manning Keays Band with Jim Keays on vocals (ex-The Masters Apprentices) and Peter Cuddihy on bass guitar (ex-Space Waltz), John Grant on keyboards (ex-Freeway), Andrew Kay on violin and keyboards, and Robert Ross on drums. When Keays left later in the year, the soul pop group was renamed as Manning and released a self-titled album in May 1978. Manning provided the singles "When a Man Loves a Woman" (a Percy Sledge cover) in December 1977 and "Call Me" in April 1978. In July a new line-up of Phil Manning Band was Cuddihy, Grant, John J Hackett on drums (ex-Rum Jungle) and Midge Marsden on guitar. His brother, Dennis, briefly joined on keyboards and in May 1979 they issued the single, "Just the Way It Goes". Dennis had left, Robbie Geapon replaced Cuddihy on bass guitar and Bob Bickerton (ex- Mándu Band) replaced Hackett on drums to record an album, Live on Polydor Records, for New Zealand release only, in 1979.

The Matt Taylor Phil Manning Band was formed in Perth in late 1980 with his former Chain bandmate. The group included Roy Daniel on bass guitar and Ric Whittle on drums and recorded an album, Oz Blues and a single "Spring Hill" both issued in June 1981. This group disbanded by December and a new line-up of Phil Manning Band was formed with Chris Copping on keyboards (ex-Procol Harum), Kerryn Tolhurst on guitar (ex-The Dingoes), and Wayne Duncan on bass guitar and Gary Young on drums (both ex-Daddy Cool). Copping was replaced by Mick O'Connor on keyboards. By 1983, with only Duncan and Young remaining, they became the Phil Manning Trio. In December he reformed Chain with Taylor and remained in the group until 1986.

Manning relocated to Queensland and recorded an acoustic solo album, It's the Blues, which was issued in early 1988 on his own label, Tamborine Music. In 1990, he followed with a cassette-only album, Live at the Storey Bridge. Manning's material for the two albums included originals together with cover versions of Blind Blake, Big Bill Broonzy, Robert Johnson, Muddy Waters and Paul Simon. Three more albums followed in the 1990s, Can't Stop (November 1992), The Back Shed (March 1995) and Two Roads (August 1997). Take Note was issued in 2000 and Migrants Dance in 2003. A compilation album, The Essential Acoustic Collection was released in 2006 and Checkmate Move followed in 2010.

In November 2015 Phil's catalogue was released digitally on iTunes and all streaming platforms through Laneway Music, a Melbourne based digital record company.

== Discography ==
=== Albums ===
List of albums, with Australian chart positions
Title	Album details	Peak chart positions
Title	Album details	AUS
I Wish There Was a Way	Released: December 1974; Format: LP, Cassette; Label: Mushroom (L 35353)	93
Manning (as Manning)	Released: April 1978; Format: LP, Cassette; Label: Indigo (INL001)	-
Phil Manning Band (as Phil Manning Band featuring Midge Marsden)	Released: 1979 (New Zealand); Format: LP, Cassette; Label: Polydor (PMB 008); Note: Live album	—N/a
Oz Blues (as Matt Taylor Phil Manning Band)	Released: 1981; Format: LP, Cassette; Label: Full Moon (FML 12002)	60
It's Blues	Released: 1988; Format: LP, Cassette; Label: Tamborine Music (TM 101)	-
Live at Stoney Bride	Released: 1990; Format: CD, Cassette; Label: Tamborine Music (TM 102); Note: Live album	-
Can't Stop	Released: November 1992; Format: CD, Cassette; Label: Tamborine Music (TM 103)	-
The Back Shed	Released: March 1995; Format: CD; Label: Tamborine Music (TM 104)	-
Two Roads	Released: 1997; Format: CD; Label: Tamborine Music (TM 105)	-
The First Thirty Years	Released: 1998; Format: CD; Label: Tamborine Music; Note: Greatest hits collection	-
Take Note	Released: 2000; Format: CD; Label: Tamborine Music (TM 106)	-
Migrants Dance	Released: 2003; Format: CD; Label: Black Market Music (BMM280.2)	-
The Essential Acoustic Collection	Released: 2006; Format: CD; Label: Black Market Music (BMM316.2); Note: compilation albums	-
Checkmate Move	Released: 2010; Format: CD, download; Label: Black Market Music	-

=== Singles ===
- "Love Is the Mender" (1974)
- "I Wish There Was a Way" (1975)
- "When a Man Loves a Woman" (1977)
- "Call Me" (1978)
- "Spring Hill" (1981)

== Awards and nominations ==
=== Go-Set Pop Poll ===
The Go-Set Pop Poll was coordinated by teen-oriented pop music newspaper, Go-Set and was established in February 1966 and conducted an annual poll during 1966 to 1972 of its readers to determine the most popular personalities.

Year	Nominee / work	Award	Result
1971	himself	Best Guitarist	3rd
