= Ash Grunwald =

Australian blues musician (born 1976)

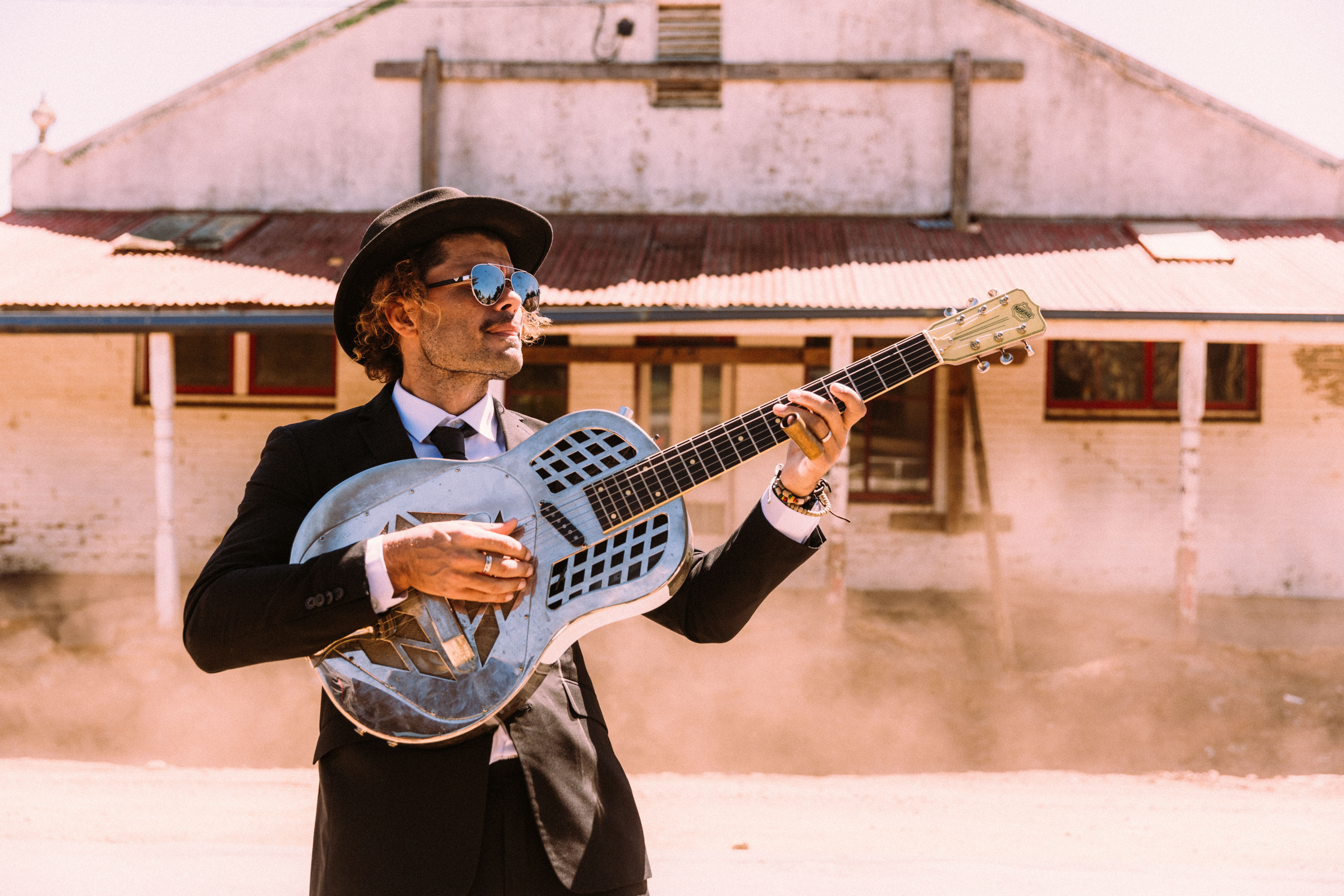

Background information
- Born: Ashley Mark Groenewald; 5 September 1976 (age 49)
- Origin: Melbourne, Victoria, Australia
- Occupations: Musician, songwriter, author
- Instruments: Vocals; guitar; harmonica; lapsteel; stomp box
- Years active: 2001–present
- Labels: Black Market; Head Records; Delta Groove; Bloodline Music
- Website: ashgrunwald.com

Ash Grunwald (born Ashley Mark Groenewald, 5 September 1976) is an Australian blues musician. He has released nine studio albums and has received five nominations for ARIA Music Awards. Five albums have charted in the ARIA Albums Chart top 50; Fish out of Water (2008), Hot Mama Vibes (2010), Trouble's Door (2012), Gargantua (2013) and Mojo (2019).

== Career ==
=== 1976–2001: Early years and early bands ===
Under the guidance of his grandfather, Ash learned to play guitar and bass as a young child and together they recorded his first ever song – a cover of Howlin' Wolf's "Going Down Slow". Grunwald began listening to the blues shows on Melbourne's community radio stations as a teenager. By his early 20s, Grunwald had been in and out of several bands including the Blue Grunwalds and the Groove Catalysts, as well as playing in a couple of duos. The Blue Grunwalds, released the album Groove Cave, which generated some local interest. The Groove Catalysts played a number of blues venues in Melbourne and at several festivals throughout 2001 and 2002.

Grunwald was trained as a secondary school teacher, which he left at age 26.

=== 2002–2005: Career beginnings with Head Records – Introducing Ash Grunwald, I Don't Believe and Live at the Corner ===
Grunwald drew attention as a solo artist with the release of his debut studio album, Introducing Ash Grunwald, a collection of blues standards and originals, including "Dolphin Song," which is based on a real life encounter Grunwald experienced with a shark and the pod of dolphins that came to his rescue. The positive response to Grunwald's debut resulted in two Australian Blues Awards (The Chain Awards) for 'Best Emerging Talent' and 'Male Vocalist of the Year' in 2003.

In 2004, released his follow up album I Don't Believe, On the album, Grunwald emulated Tom Waits experimental bang and clang percussion using hammers, spanners and pots. The album included six originals, two Waits compositions, "Going Out West" and "Jesus Gonna Be Here" and blues standards. Grunwald received an ARIA Award nomination for 'Best Blues and Roots Album' in 2004, and the Victorian Blues award for 'Male Vocalist of the Year' (equal with Lloyd Spiegel) and in 2005 the MBAS Vic / Tas award for Solo / Duo of the Year (equal with Dave Hogan).

In June 2004, Grunwald recorded Live at the Corner, an album of songs from his first two releases. Grunwald won the 2005 MBAS Vic / Tas and Australian Blues awards Album of the Year in addition to being nominated once again for the 'Best Blues And Roots album' at the 2005 ARIA Awards. In May 2005, Grunwald was invited to take over as host of Triple J's Thursday night show 'Roots N All'.

=== 2006–2009: Delta Groove Records – Give Signs, Fish Out of Water ===
In August 2006 Grunwald released Give Signs recorded on his own record label, Delta Groove Records. The album received another ARIA Award nomination for 'Best Blues and Roots Album'. In 2006, Grunwald supported James Brown at his Tasmanian concert. On 21 December 2006 Grunwald finished his role as a Triple J presenter. In September 2007 he was nominated for another ARIA award for Best Blues and Roots Album.

Grunwald released his fourth studio album, Fish Out of Water on 30 August 2008, with the album reaching No. 43 on the ARIA charts. The new album was greeted with positive reviews with many of the critics saying it is one of the best blues/roots albums of the year. Several tracks gained significant airplay on the national youth broadcaster Triple J some of these included "Breakout", "Devil Called Me a Liar" and "Joke on Me". Grunwald appeared for the first time in a Triple J Hottest 100 with one entry in the 2008 countdown, with "Breakout" reaching number 50. Fish Out of Water was nominated 'Best Blues and Roots Album' at the 2009 ARIA Awards, Grunwald's fourth in this category.

In October 2009 Grunwald recorded a performance at Fremantle's Fly By Night club for a release as a live album in early 2010.

=== 2010–2018: Hot Mama Vibes, Trouble's Door, Gargantua and Now ===
Grunwald's fifth studio album, Hot Mama Vibes was released 4 June 2010. The Album featured contributions from Mr Trials, Countbounce, Chasm, Fingers Malone, Benny Owen and Kanchana Karunaratna. Grunwald said "Mixing electronica with the blues was always a dream of mine. On the first album I was really trying to strip it back to raw elements, just be as soulful as possible. I guess every album since then has been a gradual move towards this point." Hot Mama Vibes was nominated 'Best Blues and Roots Album' at the 2010 ARIA Awards.

By the end of 2010, Grunwald relocated with his family to Byron Bay and it was here he began recording his sixth studio album, the 2012 release Trouble's Door. The album was well-supported by Triple J, particularly lead single "Longtime" which spent many weeks in high rotation. Grunwald went on to win an APRA Award for "Longtime" for Blues Song of The Year.

In early 2013, Grunwald teamed up with Scott Owen and Andy Strachan (from The Living End) and recorded a version of Gnarls Barkley's "Crazy" which was released as a free download through Grunwald's website. "Crazy" was picked up by Austereo's Triple M network and lead to a live performance on the Seven Network's program The Morning Show. The unplanned success of the single took the three back into the studio where they re-recorded some of Grunwald existing tracks; adding a driving rhythm section. The collection of tracks was released in June 2013 under the title Gargantua. The album peaked at number 46 on the ARIA Charts.

Throughout 2014, Grunwald toured rigorously overseas, most significantly supporting Xavier Rudd throughout the United States. During that trip Grunwald was awarded the LA Music Critic Award for Best International Act.

In late 2014, Grunwald returned to the studio and in February 2015, The title of his eighth studio album was unveiled as Now. The album was subsequently released on 25 September 2015 and peaked at number 52 on the ARIA Charts.

=== 2019–present: Mojo and Push the Blues Away ===
In 2019, Grunwald signed with Bloodlines Music, the company re-released his back catalogue on vinyl in February 2019.

In June 2019, Grunwald released "Whispering Voice" with Kasey Chambers, the lead single from Grunwald's ninth studio album Mojo. Mojo was released in August 2019 and peaked at number 40 on the ARIA Charts. Mojo was produced by Brian Brinkerhoff, Carla Olson and Ash.

Also in August 2019, Grunwald published his first book Surf by Day, Jam by Night. In the book, Grunwald interviews 15 of the world's top surfer-musicians; including Kelly Slater, Stephanie Gilmore, Jack Johnson, Dave Rastovich, Pete Murray, G. Love and many more. It was published by Pantera Press on 19 August 2019.

In August 2020, Grunwald released his first greatest hits compilation, a 30-track album, titled Anthology 2002–2020.

On 23 August, Josh Teskey and Ash Grunwald premiered the song "Thinking 'Bout Myself" on ABC's The Sound. The song is the lead single from their collaborative album, Push the Blues Away, released on 13 November 2020.

Grunwald released Shout Into the Noise in March 2022.

== Discography ==
=== Studio albums ===
List of studio albums, with release date, label, and selected chart positions shown
| Title | Album details | Peak chart positions |
| Title | Album details | AUS |
|---|---|---|
| Introducing Ash Grunwald | Released: August 2002; Label: Black Market Music; Format: CD, digital download | — |
| I Don't Believe | Released: 5 April 2004; Label: Head (HEAD047); Format: CD, digital download | — |
| Give Signs | Released: 28 August 2006; Label: Delta Groove (DG04); Format: CD+DVD, digital download | 84 |
| Fish Out of Water | Released: August 2008; Label: Delta Groove (DG06); Format: CD, LP, digital download | 43 |
| Hot Mama Vibes | Released: 4 June 2010; Label: Delta Groove (DG09); Format: CD, LP, digital download | 31 |
| Trouble's Door | Released: 11 May 2012; Label: Delta Groove, Shock (DG10); Format: CD, LP, digital download | 29 |
| Gargantua (with Scott Owen and Andy Strachan) | Released: 28 June 2013; Label: Delta Groove, Shock (DG11); Format: CD, LP, digital download | 46 |
| Now | Released: 25 September 2015; Label: Delta Groove, Shock (DG12); Format: CD, LP, digital download, streaming | 52 |
| Mojo | Released: 30 August 2019; Label: Bloodlines (BLOOD53); Format: CD, LP, digital download, streaming | 40 |
| Push the Blues Away (with Josh Teskey) | Released: 13 November 2020; Label: Ivy League (IVY582); Format: CD, LP, digital download, streaming | 8 |
| Shout Into the Noise | Released: 11 March 2022; Label: Bloodlines (BLOOD95); Format: CD, LP, digital download, streaming | — (Note: Shout Into the Noise did not enter the ARIA Top 100 Albums Chart, but peaked at number 15 on the Australian Albums Chart, and number 11 on the ARIA Vinyl Albums Chart.) |
| Bluesfest Studio Sessions | Released: 17 November 2023; Label: Delta Groove (DGREC001); Format: CD, digital download, streaming | — (Note: Bluesfest Studio Sessions did not enter the ARIA Top 100 Albums Chart, but peaked at number 17 on the Australian Albums Chart.) |

=== Live albums ===
List of live albums, with release date and label shown
| Title | Details |
|---|---|
| Live at the Corner | Released: 7 February 2005; Label: Head Records (HEAD051); Format: CD, digital download |
| Live from the Factory | Released: 2008; Label: Delta Groove (DG05); Format: CD, digital download |
| Live at the Fly by Night | Released: February 2010; Label: Delta Groove (DG07); Format: CD, digital download |

=== Compilation albums ===
List of compilation albums, with release date and label shown
| Title | Details |
|---|---|
| Anthology 2002–2020 | Released: 11 August 2020; Label: Bloodlines; Format: Digital download, streaming |

== Awards and nominations ==
=== AIR Awards ===
The Australian Independent Record Awards (commonly known informally as AIR Awards) is an annual awards night to recognise, promote and celebrate the success of Australia's Independent Music sector.

| Year | Nominee / work | Award | Result | Ref. |
|---|---|---|---|---|
| 2009 | Fish Out of Water | Best Independent Blues and Roots Album | Nominated | |
| 2010 | Hot Mama Vibes | Best Independent Blues and Roots Album | Nominated | |
| 2012 | Trouble's Door | Best Independent Blues and Roots Album | Nominated | |
| 2021 | Push the Blues Away (with Josh Teskey) | Best Independent Blues and Roots Album or EP | Nominated | |

=== APRA Awards ===
The APRA Awards are presented annually from 1982 by the Australasian Performing Right Association (APRA), "honouring composers and songwriters".

| Year | Nominee / work | Award | Result |
|---|---|---|---|
| 2010 | "Breakout" (Ashley Groenewald, Pip Norman) | Blues & Roots Work of the Year | Won |
| 2011 | "Walking" (Ash Grunwald) | Blues & Roots Work of the Year | Nominated |
| 2013 | "Longtime" (Ash Grunwald) | Blues & Roots Work of the Year | Won |
| 2021 | "Ain't My Problem" (featuring the Teskey Brothers) | Most Performed Blues & Roots Work | Nominated |
| 2022 | "Hungry Heart" (Josh Teskey & Ash Grunwald) | Most Performed Blues and Roots Work | Nominated |
| 2023 | "I Want You to Know" | Most Performed Blues and Roots Work | Nominated |

=== ARIA Awards ===
The ARIA Music Awards are presented annually from 1987 by the Australian Recording Industry Association (ARIA). Ash Grunwald has had six nominations, all in the category of ARIA Award for Best Blues and Roots Album.

| Year | Nominee / work | Award | Result | Ref. |
|---|---|---|---|---|
| 2004 | I Don't Believe | Best Blues and Roots Album | Nominated | |
| 2005 | Live at the Corner | Best Blues & Roots Album | Nominated | |
| 2007 | Give Signs | Best Blues & Roots Album | Nominated | |
| 2009 | Fish Out of Water | Best Blues & Roots Album | Nominated | |
| 2010 | Hot Mama Vibes | Best Blues & Roots Album | Nominated | |
| 2021 | Push the Blues Away (with Josh Teskey) | Best Blues & Roots Album | Nominated | |

=== Music Victoria Awards ===
The Music Victoria Awards, are an annual awards night celebrating Victorian music. They commenced in 2005.

| Year | Nominee / work | Award | Result | Ref. |
|---|---|---|---|---|
| 2021 | Josh Teskey and Ash Grunwald | Best Blues Act | Nominated | |
