= Longtime (Ash Grunwald song) =

Single by Ash Grunwald

from the album Trouble's Door
- Released: April 2012
- Length: 3:33
- Label: Delta Groove
- Songwriter: Ash Grunwald
- Producers: Ash Grunwald; Fingers Malone

"Longtime" is a song by Australian blues musician Ash Grunwald. The song was released in April 2012 as the lead single from Grunwald's sixth studio album, Trouble's Door.

At the APRA Music Awards of 2013, "Longtime" won "Blues & Roots Work of the Year"

== Music video ==
The music video for "Longtime" was released on 25 April 2012.

The clip was filmed in two days at The Pass and at Broken Head, NSW and features a number of surfing musicians including Pete Murray, Xavier Rudd, Kram (Spiderbait), Scotty Owen (The Living End), Bob McTavish, Fingers Malone, Derek Hynde, Beau Young and Dave Rastovich surfing in the clip.

== Reception ==
In an album review, Andrew Nock from Music Feeds said "First single off the album 'Longtime' is a killer track, with a guitar hook so catchy and infectious, it's impossible not to feel incredibly happy and upbeat stomping your foot and grooving out to it. Such a funky sound resonates through the song by incorporating many guitar loops, with varying effects and multiple percussive elements." adding "The vocal distortion in the chorus between powerful lyric, 'Thought I was high but I was barely alive', makes it difficult to distinguish between Ash's hummed voice and guitar, inadvertently creating an incredibly infectious hook".
