= Trouble's Door =

Studio album by Ash Grunwald
- Released: 11 May 2012
- Label: Delta Groove
- Producers: Ash Grunwald; Fingers Malone

Ash Grunwald chronology
Hot Mama Vibes (2010)	Trouble's Door (2012)	Gargantua (2013)

Trouble's Door is the sixth studio album by Australian blues musician Ash Grunwald. It was released in May 2012, peaking at number 29 on the ARIA Charts; his highest charting album.

Upon release, Grunwald said the album involved "some of [his] most personal songwriting", laying the foundations for his "most internal album to date".

At the APRA Music Awards of 2013 "Longtime" won "Blues & Roots Work of the Year"

== Reception ==
Professional ratings
Review scores
Source	Rating
Blues Rock Review	9/10 stars
NZ Herald	3/5 stars

Andrew Nock from Music Feeds said "Across the record, Ash complements his voice with expert guitar playing that delves in influences of blues and roots, country, and psychedelia. His use of different guitar effects are one of many elements that give each track their own signature feeling and sound, which is impressive considering he uses the same base instruments for each track." adding "There is not a single dull moment on this record. As the mood shifts with each song, you are pulled into another experience, and there are many to be had. A refreshing listen from start to finish."

Tyler Quiring from Blues Rock Review said "There's a lot here to appeal to fans of many genres, as Grunwald makes himself and his music very accessible and easy to appreciate. His songwriting flawlessly interweaves clever lyrics through a metrical tapestry of tunes. As he effortlessly combines traditional and non-traditional instrumentation and musical methods, his true talent quickly rises to the surface." calling it "a tight and well-executed record.".

NZ Herald said the album "...channel blues musicians of old, mixed in with a little Ben Harper and The Black Keys" but added "the lyrical material sometimes gets a little overbearing in its political protest, and though he has all the right raw ingredients, these 12 songs don't reach the compelling genius of The Black Keys."

== Track listing ==
Standard edition
No.	Title	Writer(s)	Length
1.	"The Demon in Me"	Ash Grunwald	3:45
2.	"Shake That Thing"	Grunwald	3:50
3.	"Longtime"	Grunwald	3:33
4.	"Trouble's Door"	Grunwald	4:01
5.	"180"	Grunwald	3:25
6.	"Sail"	Aaron Bruno	3:48
7.	"Nervous"	Grunwald	4:02
8.	"Ramblin' Man"	Hank Williams	2:51
9.	"When You Need 'Em"	Grunwald	3:45
10.	"Telling Lies"	Grunwald	2:25
11.	"Outta Time"	Grunwald	2:33
12.	"What You Had"	Grunwald	3:16

== Charts ==
Chart (2012)	Peak position
Australian Albums (ARIA)	29

== Release history ==
Region	Date	Format	Edition(s)	Label	Catalogue
Australia	11 May 2012	CD; DD	Standard	Delta Groove	DG10
Australia	22 February 2019	CD; Digital Download; Streaming; Vinyl	Reissue	Bloodlines Records	BLOOD40
