= Hot Mama Vibes =

Studio album by Ash Grunwald
- Released: 4 June 2010
- Studio: Alchemix Studios, Brisbane
- Genre: Blues; rock
- Label: Delta Groove
- Producer: Ash Grunwald; Countbounce (aka Pip Norman); Marly Luske; Trials

Ash Grunwald chronology
Live at the Fly by Night (2010)	Hot Mama Vibes (2010)	Trouble's Door (2012)

Hot Mama Vibes is the fifth studio album by Australian blues musician Ash Grunwald. It was released in June 2010, peaking at number 31 on the ARIA Charts.

With reference to the album name and title track, Grunwald said: "It's not something I would have put out there in the past. I would have constrained myself; I wouldn't have felt comfortable [but] this is my fifth album so it was time to just launch in there, do whatever I feel like."

At the ARIA Music Awards of 2010, the album was nominated for Best Blues and Roots Album.

The album's opening track, "Walking", was featured in the soundtrack for 2011's Limitless, starring Bradley Cooper.

== Reception ==
Rich Thompson from SoulShine said "Hot Mama Vibes is a much rawer, more frantic outing than his past couple of albums, achieving that same sound of pulsating drum beats and searing guitar solos with a lot less polish."

Jason Strange from MusicFeeds said "Australia's funkiest blues man has turned it up with his new record Hot Mama Vibe. This album oozes cool, the riffs are huge and fuzzy, Ash's voice is deep and seductive and the songs are upbeat and catchy."

== Track listing ==
Standard edition
No.	Title	Writer(s)	Length
1.	"Walking"	Ash Grunwald	4:07
2.	"Tear the Roof Off"	Grunwald, Pip Norman	3:56
3.	"Raw"	Grunwald	3:24
4.	"Hot Mama"	Grunwald	3:07
5.	"Lady Luck"	Grunwald	3:17
6.	"Love Me"	Grunwald	4:10
7.	"Change"	Grunwald	3:29
8.	"Somebody"	Grunwald	4:57
9.	"Born for Good Luck"	Grunwald	3:03
10.	"Get It Back"	Grunwald	3:07
11.	"Mind Playing Tricks"	Grunwald	2:09
12.	"Never Let You Go"	Grunwald	3:36
13.	"Parents" (featuring Funkoars)	Grunwald, Sesta Hons, Mr Trials	3:58

== Charts ==
Chart (2010)	Peak position
Australian Albums (ARIA)	31

== Release history ==
Region	Date	Format	Edition(s)	Label	Catalogue
Australia	6 June 2010	CD	Standard	Delta Groove	DG09
Australia	22 February 2019	CD; Digital Download; Streaming; Vinyl	Reissue	Bloodlines Records	BLOOD39
