= Western Flyer (Australian group) =

- Origin: Australia
- Genres: Pop rock
- Years active: 1975–1979
- Labels: Infinity Records
- Past members: Brian Peacock, Bruce Devenish, James Gillard, John Poole-Johnson, Matt Taylor, Mick Elliot

Western Flyer were a short lived Australian blues band formed in the mid-1970s. The group released two studio albums in the late 1970s.

== Discography ==
=== Studio albums ===
List of studio albums, with Australian positions
Title	Details	Peak chart positions
Title	Details	AUS
First Flight	Released: July 1978; Label: Infinity (L 36636); Formats: Cassette, LP	58
Live to Survive!	Released: 1979; Label: Infinity (L 37055); Formats: Cassette, LP	-

=== Compilation albums ===
Title	Details
The Best of Western Flyer	Released: 2001; Label: Forever Records (FOR CD 1); Formats: CD

=== Singles ===
Year	Title	Album
1977	"Western Towns "	non album single
1978	"Providence"	First Flight
1978	"Ocean Dancer"	First Flight
1979	"Last of the Lovers "	non album single
1979	"Throw Me a Line "	Live to Survive!
