= Chain (band) =

Australian blues band

- Also known as: The Chain; Matt Taylor's Chain
- Origin: Melbourne, Victoria, Australia
- Genres: Blues; R&B
- Years active: 1968–1974; 1982; 1983–1986; 1988; 1991–1992; 1995–present
- Labels: Infinity; Festival; Mushroom; EMI; BMG; Forever
- Members: Phil Manning; Matt Taylor; Barry Harvey; Dirk Du Bois
- Past members: see Members

Chain are an Australian blues band formed as The Chain in late 1968 with a line-up including guitarist and vocalist Phil Manning and lead vocalist Wendy Saddington. Saddington left in May 1969 and in September 1970 Matt Taylor joined on lead vocals and harmonica. During the 1990s they were referred to as Matt Taylor's Chain. Their single, "Black and Blue" (January 1971), is their only top twenty hit. It was written and recorded by the line-up of Manning, Taylor, Barry Harvey on drums and Barry Sullivan on bass guitar. The related album, Toward the Blues, followed in September and peaked in the top ten. Manfred Mann's Earth Band covered "Black and Blue" on their 1973 album Messin'.

Chain had various line-ups until July 1974 when they disbanded. They reformed in 1982 for a one-off concert and more permanently from 1983 to 1986. From 1998 Chain members are Harvey, Manning, Taylor and Dirk Du Bois on bass guitar. Both Manning and Taylor have also had separate solo careers. In 2005 Chain released an album, Sweet Honey, and continued touring irregularly. On 3 May 2009 they performed at the Cairns Blues Festival. Barry Sullivan died in October 2003. Wendy Saddington died in June 2013 after being diagnosed with oesophageal cancer.

== Career ==
=== 1968–70: Formation to Live Chain ===
Chain's origins trace back to the Beat 'n Tracks (often incorrectly cited as the Beaten Tracks), a pop, blues and R&B band, which formed in Perth in 1965. They included Dave Cook on rhythm guitar and vocals, Dave Cross on rhythm guitar and vocals, Paul Frieze on bass guitar, Ross Partington on lead vocals and harmonica (ex-Majestics), Alan Power on lead guitar and vocals, and John Vanderhagh on drums. They played cover versions of the Beatles and Rolling Stones as well as work by Motown, blues and rock artists. Vanderhagh left in the next year and was replaced by Frank Capeling on drums. Cook left in early 1967 and was replaced by Warren Morgan on Farfisa organ and later on Hammond organ. Frieze left in that year and was replaced by John (the "Scotsman") Gray on bass guitar (ex-Ray Hoff and the Off Beats). Capeling also left in 1967 and was replaced by Ace Follington on drums (ex Yeoman). Later that year Cross left but was not replaced, Scott was replaced by Murray Wilkins on bass guitar and vocals (ex-West Coast Trio).

With the addition of Morgan on organ the Beat 'n Tracks incorporated material from Traffic, Vanilla Fudge, Young Rascals and the Band. In 1968 they entered the Hoadley's Battle of the Sounds and won the Perth heats. Power was replaced by Dave Hole on lead guitar and vocals who left whilst they were in Melbourne competing in the Hoadley's national finals and was replaced by Phil Manning on lead guitar and vocals (ex-Bay City Union, Bobby & Laurie, Laurie Allen Revue). The band returned to Perth but soon relocated to Melbourne. Partington departed in December 1968, returning to Perth to form the Tracks with Joey Anderson on drums (ex-Sari Brit), Pete Tindal on bass guitar and vocals (ex-Cherokees), Peter Waddell on Hammond organ and vocals (ex-Paul McKay Sound), and Lindsay Wells on lead guitar and vocals (also ex-Sari Brit). Partington was replaced by Wendy Saddington on lead vocals (ex-James Taylor Move), who provided the band's new name, the Chain, referencing Aretha Franklin's song, "Chain of Fools". The Chain's original line-up was Follington, Manning, Morgan, Wilkins and Saddington.

Garry Raffaele of The Canberra Times heard the Chain performing early in 1969 and said that "[Saddington] is by far the best female rhythm and blues singer in the country ... [they] gave me the finest night of live rhythm and blues I've heard from an Australian group." Saddington left in May of that year to write for the music newspaper Go-Set. She also joined the band Copperwine on lead vocals, with Harry Brus on bass guitar and Jeff St John on co-lead vocals. She later had a solo career. Saddington was replaced by New Zealand-born Glyn Mason (ex-Larry's Rebels). Wilkins left in August and was replaced by Tim Piper (ex-Electric Heap) on bass guitar. Morgan, who left to join Billy Thorpe and the Aztecs, was replaced by Claude Papesch on organ (also ex-Electric Heap).

The Chain's first single, "Show Me Home", which was written by Manning, was released by Festival Records in October 1969. Australian musicologist Ian McFarlane said that "[it] was one of the first progressive blues records ever issued in Australia". Follington, Papesch and Piper had all left by the time it appeared. The rhythm section from Wild Cherries, Barry Harvey on drums and Barry Sullivan on bass guitar, joined and their name was shortened to "Chain" late in 1969. The band's first album, Live Chain, was recorded in June 1970 at Caesar's Palace discothèque, Sydney, with the line-up of Harvey, Manning, Mason, Morgan and Sullivan. It was released in October. Mason had already left to travel overseas. Early in 1975 he had returned to Australia and joined a progressive rock group, Ariel.

=== 1970–1971: Classic line-up to Toward the Blues ===
In September 1970, Manning asked Matt Taylor to become their full-time front man. Taylor had moved to Melbourne from Brisbane with his band the Bay City Union (which had briefly included Manning), although that band had subsequently broken up. At this point, Chain were Manning, Taylor, Harvey (Little Goose, LG or Albert Goose) and Sullivan (Big Goose or BG), referred to by fans as the classic line-up. "Black and Blue" was released by this line-up as a single in March 1971 on Festival's Infinity label, which peaked at No. 12 on the national singles charts in May. The second single, "Judgement" released in July reached the top 40 nationally and was followed in September by their first studio album Toward the Blues, on the Infinity Records label (a subsidiary of Festival records). The album was produced by John L Sayers and recorded at TCS Studios. This included an extended version of their signature track, "Black and Blue", and continued to sell steadily, eventually going gold over twenty years after its original release. A further single "Gonna Miss you Babe" was recorded with this line-up at Festival Studios Sydney, also produced by Sayers. The classic line-up of Chain only lasted about eleven months (August 1970 to July 1971) at that time, when Harvey, Manning and Sullivan all left. Harvey joined King Harvest, Manning formed a duo Pilgrimage with ex-The Chain bandmate Morgan, and Sullivan joined Carson.

=== Other 1970s line-ups ===
In July 1971, Taylor briefly enlisted Kevin Murphy on drums (ex-Wild Cherries, Billy Thorpe and the Aztecs, King Harvest), Charlie Tumahai on bass guitar and Lindsay Wells on lead guitar (both ex-Healing Force). Murphy left in September and Taylor continued for another month with Laurie Pryor on drums (ex-Healing Force) but then Taylor commenced his solo career. Taylor's best known solo works are his singles, "I Remember when I Was Young" and "Fair Dinkum Aussie Blues" and his albums, Straight as a Die and Music. Chain reformed in November 1971 with Harvey, Manning, Mason, Morgan and Sullivan to record, Live Again, which was not released until October 1972. A three piece line-up of Morgan, Pryor and Sullivan performed at the inaugural 1972 Sunbury Pop Festival. In February 1973, Manning changed the name of his then group Mighty Mouse to Chain with: Mal Capewell on saxophone and flute (ex-Company Caine), Ian Clyne on organ (ex-The Loved Ones), Sullivan on bass guitar and Harvey on drums. Chain's band manager, Michael Gudinski had signed the band to his newly formed label, Mushroom Records which released two non-charting singles and then an album, Two of a Kind in December 1973 with contributions from James Madison on guitar and George Beauford on vocals and harmonica. Both were members of touring mate Muddy Waters' band. Forming in February 1974, the next Chain line-up were Manning, Sullivan and Mal Logan on keyboards (ex-Healing Force, Carson) and Tony Lunt on drums (ex-Carson); they broke up in July and Mushroom released the compilation album, History of Chain, in October.

=== Later line-ups to current ===
After breaking up completely for several years, Chain briefly reformed with the classic line up (Harvey, Manning, Sullivan and Taylor) in January 1982, to celebrate the tenth anniversary of Mushroom Records. A couple of songs from their performance appeared on the triple album set Mushroom Evolution Concert. A more permanent reformation occurred from December 1983, which resulted in Child of the Street in October 1985 and two singles. Manning and Sullivan left again in late 1986, Taylor and Harvey continued Chain with John Meyer on guitar (ex-Saracen, Rose Tattoo) and Roy Daniel on bass guitar; they released, Australian Rhythm and Blues in April 1988. Meyer, Taylor and Bob Fortesque on bass guitar (ex-Blackfeather) and Michael Burn on drums released the next Chain album Blue Metal in May 1990. By late 1991, Taylor had formed another version of Chain now called, Matt Taylor's Chain with Dirk Du Bois on bass guitar, Jeff Lang on guitar, Bob Patient on piano and Gus Warburton on drums. This line-up recorded a new album Trouble in the Wind aka Walls 2 McGoo released in 1992. From 1992, varied line-ups of Chain or Matt Taylor's Chain toured Australia irregularly. In 1998, Chain as Matt Taylor, Phil Manning, Barry Harvey and Dirk Du Bois performed at Mushroom's 25th anniversary concert, Mushroom 25 Live and released their own live album, The First 30 Years. Chain toured into 1999 and released a new album, Mix up the Oils in July on Forever Records. In 2005 they released, Sweet Honey, and continued touring irregularly. On 3 May 2009, Chain performed at the Cairns Blues Festival. This latest Chain line-up continued into 2014 with appearances at The Caravan Club in Oakleigh, Victoria.

== Members ==
The Chain, Chain or Matt Taylor's Chain members.

Current Members

- Phil Manning – guitars, backing and lead vocals (1968–1974, 1982, 1983–1986, 1991, 1995–current)
- Barry Harvey – drums (1969–74, 1982, 1983–1986, 1988, 1995–current)
- Matt Taylor – lead vocals, harmonica (1970–1971, 1982, 1983–1986, 1991–1992, 1995–current)
- Dirk Du Bois – bass (1991–1992, 1995–current)

Past Members

- Wendy Saddington – lead vocals (1968–1969)
- Warren Morgan – keyboards, backing and lead vocals (1968–1972)
- Murray Wilkins – bass (1968–1969)
- Ace Follington – drums (1968–1969)
- Glyn Mason – guitars, lead and backing vocals (1970–1972)
- Tim Piper – bass (1969)
- Claude Papesch – keyboards (1969)
- Barry Sullivan – bass (1969–74, 1982, 1983–1986)
- Kevin Murphy – drums (1971)
- Charlie Tumahai – bass (1971)
- Lindsay Wells – guitars (1971)
- Laurie Pryor – drums (1971–1972)
- Graham Morgan – drums (1972)
- Mal Capewell – saxophone, flute (1973–1974)
- Ian Clyne – keyboards (1973–1974)
- George Beauford – lead vocals, harmonica (1973, session musician)
- James Madison – guitars (1973, session musician)
- Mal Logan – keyboards (1974)
- Tony Lunt – drums (1974)
- John Meyer – guitars (1986, 1988, 1991)
- Roy Daniel – bass (1988)
- Bob Fortesque – bass (1991)
- Michael Burn – drums (1991)
- Jeff Lang – guitars (1991–1992)
- Bob Patient – keyboards (1991–1992)
- Gus Warburton – drums (1991–1992)
- Malcolm Eastick – guitars (1992)

Timeline

== Discography ==
=== Studio albums ===
List of albums, with Australian chart positions
Title	Album details	Peak chart positions	Certification
Title	Album details	AUS	Certification
Toward the Blues	Released: September 1971; Label: Infinity (SINL 934295)	6	ARIA: Gold
Two of a Kind	Released: December 1973; Label: Mushroom Records (L-35017)	-	
Child of the Street	Released: October 1985; Label: Team Records (HIP-100)	-	
Australian Rhythm & Blues	Released: 1987; Label: RCA (VPL1 0709)	-	
Blue Metal	Released: 1989; Label: Forever Records (FOR CD 4)	-	
Mix up the Oils	Released: 1999; Label: Forever Records (FORTM31)	-	
Sweet Honey	Released: 2004; Label: Forever Records (FORTM33)	-	

=== Live albums ===
List of albums, with Australian chart positions
Title	Album details	Peak chart positions
Title	Album details	AUS
Chain Live	Released: 1970; Label: Infinity (SINL 933926)	15
Live Again	Released: 1972; Label: Infinity (SINL 934568)	51

=== Compilation albums ===
- History of Chain – Mushroom (October 1974)
- Best of Chain – Infinity (1978)
- Trouble in the Wind – Aim (1992)
- The First 30 Years – Forever (1998)
- Towards the Blues (30th Anniversary Edition) – Festival Mushroom (September 2001)

=== Singles ===
- "Show Me Home" – Festival (October 1969)
- "Black and Blue" – Infinity (March 1971) No. 12 AUS, No. 10 Go-Set
- "Judgement" – Infinity (July 1971) No. 30 AUS
- "Sunny Day" – Infinity (October 1972) No. 92 AUS
- "I Thought You Weren't My Friend" – Mushroom (August 1973) No. 89 AUS
- "I'm Gonna Miss You, Babe" – Mushroom (November 1973) No. 65 AUS
- "I'm Gonna Miss You Babe" – Infinity (1980)
- "I Don't Want to Be Like Everyone Else" – EMI (1985)
- "(Doin' The) Highway 31 Shuffle" – EMI (1986)
- "Harmonica" – Wheatley 104802

== Awards and nominations ==
=== Go-Set Pop Poll ===
The Go-Set Pop Poll was coordinated by teen-oriented pop music newspaper, Go-Set and was established in February 1966 and conducted an annual poll during 1966 to 1972 of its readers to determine the most popular personalities.

Year	Nominee / work	Award	Result
1971	themselves	Best Group	4th
1971	"Black & Blue"	Best Australian Single	4th
