= Matt Taylor (musician) =

Australian blues musician (born 1948)

- Born: Matthew Taylor; July 1948 (age 77); Brisbane, Queensland, Australia
- Genres: Blues
- Occupations: Singer-songwriter, guitarist
- Instruments: Vocals, harmonica, guitar
- Years active: 1966–present
- Labels: Festival; Mushroom; Forever Records; Laneway Music

Matthew Taylor (born July 1948) is an Australian blues musician. He is best known for his work with long-lasting blues band Chain and for the hit song "I Remember When I Was Young".

== Biography ==
Matt Taylor was born in Brisbane, Queensland, in July 1948. He grew up in a working-class family in the suburb of Spring Hill. His father, who had emigrated from Liverpool, England, was a tram driver.

Taylor began listening to blues records in high school, and he taught himself the guitar and harmonica. In February 1966, he joined the Bay City Union, one of Australia's first electric blues bands. They moved to Melbourne in December 1966 and achieved some success playing in dance halls and clubs. They recorded a single "Mo’reen" and "Mary Mary" released on the Festival label in 1968. Among the other members of this band was Glenn Wheatley, who was also their manager.

The Bay City Union broke up in May 1968. Taylor joined the Wild Cherries in October 1968, but left the following month. During 1969 and 1970, he played with progressive heavy rock/blues bands Horse and Genesis (not the UK prog band of the same name).

From September 1970 to October 1971, Taylor was the front-man for the blues band Chain, which had a hit single ("Black and Blue") and album ("Toward the Blues") during this period. He then quit the music industry and went to live on a commune led by Fred and Mary Robinson at Beechworth.

In 1973, he returned to the music scene as a solo artist, releasing three albums over the next three years, and scoring a major hit with the single "I Remember When I Was Young". He was one of the first artists to record for Mushroom Records, and was managed by Michael Gudinski.

He moved to Balingup, Western Australia, in 1975, to re-join the Robinsons in a new commune, but was eventually expelled after serious disagreements emerged. He then formed a new band, Western Flyer, with a more country-flavoured sound. Western Flyer produced two albums and had some success between 1977 and 1979.

Since 1976, Taylor has lived in Perth, Western Australia. He has continued to tour and record with various line-ups of Chain, as well as releasing two solo albums and touring as a solo artist.

Taylor has played with a wide range of Australian artists, including Phil Manning, Dave Hole, Lucky Oceans, Broderick Smith, Jeff Lang, Chris Finnen, Lobby Loyde, Ian ‘Willie’ Winter and Greg Lawrie. He has supported major American blues artists like B.B. King, Albert King, Freddie King, Muddy Waters, Buddy Guy, Willie Dixon, and Albert Collins.

Albert Collins said of him: "You play the blues, but it’s like no other blues I’ve ever heard in my life".

In May 2010, Taylor was inducted into the WAM Hall of Fame.

== Discography ==
=== Studio albums ===
List of albums, with Australian chart positions
Title	Album details	Peak chart positions
Title	Album details	AUS
Straight as a Die	Released: 1973; Label: Mushroom Records (L-34955)	16
Music	Released: 1974; Label: Mushroom Records (L-35229)	72
Old New and Intuitive	Released: 1975; Label: Mushroom Records (L-35609)	-
Always Land on Your Feet (As Matt Taylor Band)	Released: 1980; Label: Forever Records	-
OzBlues (As Matt Taylor Phil Manning Band)	Released: 1981; Label: Full Moon Records (12002)	60
Pyramids & Spirals	Released: 1995; Label: Newmarket Music (NEW CD 1062.2)	-
The Awakening	Released: 1997; Label: Forever Records (5FORCDS)	-
From the Wilderness	Released: 2005; Label: Forever Records (5FORCDS)	-
The Puzzle	Released: 2017; Label: Forever Records (5FORCDS)	-
Ozindigo Catalyst	Released: 2018; Label: Forever Records	-
Ozindigo The Prize	Released: 2020; Label: Forever Records	-

== See also ==
- Chain (band)
- Western Flyer (Australian group)
