= Sunny Kim (singer) =

South Korean composer and singer (born 1979)

- Occupations: Jazz composer and singer

Korean name
- Hangul: 김윤선
- RR: Gim Yunseon
- MR: Kim Yunsŏn

Sunny Kim (born June 6, 1979) is a South Korean composer and singer whose work is predominantly based in jazz music.

== Selected discography ==
=== As a leader ===
- 2008 - Android Ascension (YDS Music : Korea)

=== with Ben Monder ===
- 2016 - The Dream of the Earth (ADVART Music)

=== with Prana Trio ===
- 2004 - After Dark (Circavision Productions : USA)
- 2006 - Pranam (Circavision Productions : USA)
- 2009 - The Singing Image of Fire (Circavision Productions : USA)

=== with Roswell Rudd Quartet ===
- 2008 - Keep Your Heart Right (Sunnyside Records : USA)

=== with MadLove ===
- 2009 - White with Foam (Ipecac Recordings: USA)

=== with Monocle ===
- 2007 - Outer Sunset (Hidden Shore : Australia)

=== Guest appearances ===
- 2006 - Circle (by Seo Young Do Trio)
- 2006 - Lounge Rap Music Vol. 1 (by Lifted)
- 2007 - Mozart & Jazz (by JB Trio & Quintet)
- 2008 - Into a New Groove (by Kyungyoon John Nam)
- 2010 - The Words Projects 3 Miniatures (by Sam Sadigursky)
- 2010 - Music for Robots (by Suite Unravelling)
- 2014 - Let's Face the Music and Dance (duet with Todd Gordon on the album Love dot com)
