= The Tongue =

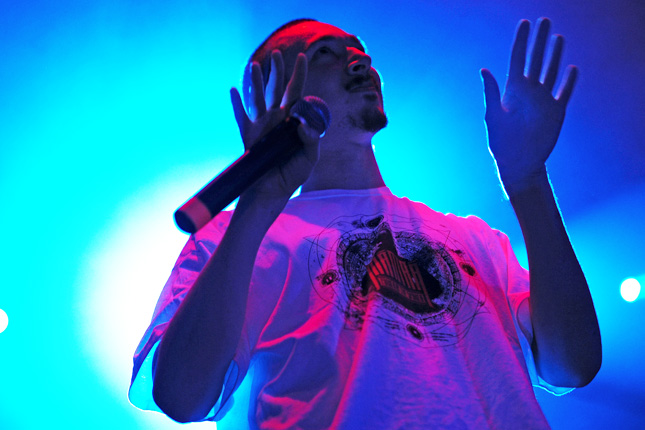

Background information
- Also known as: Lil' Teezy, Yung Tunga
- Born: Xannon Shirley
- Origin: Sydney, Australia
- Genre: Hip hop
- Years active: 2004–2022

Xannon Shirley, better known by the stage name The Tongue, is an Australian rapper, DJ and high school teacher from Sydney. He released two EPs (Bad Education and "Victorious Remixes"), four albums (Shock And Awe, Alternative Energy, Surrender To Victory and Hard Feelings) and three mixtapes (Redux, The Tongue is Dead and The Sextape). He also released Bloodwork: The Best of The Tongue in 2022.

== Musical career ==
The Tongue represented Australia in the "Battle 4 Supremacy" competition against New Zealand in 2005 and won the Revolver MC battle the same year. Tongue's songs have been placed on rotation by national Australian youth broadcaster Triple J.

Tongue was signed by independent Sydney record label Elefant Traks following the submission of the Bad Education EP to the Marrickville-based label—the EP was a result of the Revolver victory and featured the production skills of the Bag Raiders (Jack Glass and Chris Stacey), who were former schoolmates of the MC.

In 2009 Tongue hosted the Elefant Traks 10th Anniversary Party Live DVD that was released nationally the same year. The MC also performed the songs "Bad Education", "The Punch", "The Blues" and "The Real Thing" at the anniversary event.

On 11 November 2012, Elefant Traks performed a tribute to children's author Dr Seuss. Featuring over 25 musical performers, the event occurred at the Sydney Opera House in Sydney, Australia and featured a recital of "Gerald McBoing-Boing" by the Tongue.

His second album Alternative Energy features production from El Gusto (Hermitude) and M-Phazes, while his third album Surrender To Victory was solely produced by Cam Bluff from Queensland, Australia. Tongue has also released three free mixtapes in the years 2008, 2009 and 2011.

The Tongue's third album entitled Surrender to Victory, would officially be released on 29 March 2013. The release of a single, entitled "Drums", preceded the album release date and a promotional video was published on the label's YouTube profile. The video also reveals that the album was produced by Cam Bluff and features Suffa from the Hilltop Hoods.

In early May 2013, the MC announced a national Australian tour in support of the third album that will be undertaken over June and July 2013.

The official music video for the song "Australian Dreaming" from Surrender to Victory was produced by the LESMEC company, the video features Tongue in a variety of roles, including a street-based sex worker, a police officer, and a drug dealer.

In 2015 the Tongue released his forth solo album "Hard Feelings", executive produced by Sydney's Papertoy and featuring the likes of Ngaiire, Ev Jones (Jones Jnr), Tenth Dan and Jeswon from Thundamentals.

After touring the album nationally in 2016, the Tongue parted ways with Elefant Traks.

In March 2022 the Tongue released a new single "Joy ft Inês" with an accompanying film-clip directed by Tyler Smith.

In May 2022 the Tongue released Bloodwork: The Best of The Tongue a 19 track compilation featuring songs selected from across his four albums, EPs and mixtapes.

In August 2022 the Tongue released "Sadly", a song exclusive to his Youtube channel. The song was rumoured to be a diss track to Urthboy, the CEO of Elefant Traks but this has never been confirmed.

On 1 December 2022 the Tongue released the music video for his new single "Neck + Neck" – the first Australian hip hop clip ever to be made entirely using A.I (Artificial Intelligence) generated art. The video features 'cameos' from Vladimir Putin, Flume, James Packer, Kobe Bryant, Tai Tuivasa, Elle Macpherson, Danny Lim, Kanye West, Jim Morrison, Adam Goodes and many more.

== Live performance ==
The Tongue undertook many headline tours around Australia from 2006 to 2016 in support of his various albums and mixtapes. He also toured as a backup vocalist with Sydney group Astronomy Class (Ozi Batla, Chasm and Sir Robbo).

The Tongue and Astronomy Class performed in Cambodia in 2012 as part of The Tiger Translate Festival.

The Tongue performed at major Australian festivals, including the Big Day Out, Good Vibrations Festival, Groovin' The Moo, Sydney Festival, Peats Ridge, Sounds of Spring, Coaster and Park Jam. He has also completed national tours with Mac Miller, Astronomy Class, Drapht and Pharoahe Monch.

From 2013 to 2015, the Tongue produced and hosted a monthly spoken-word event called Speech Therapy at Work-Shop in Redfern. Guest performers at Speech Therapy included the likes of Remi, Mantra, Brad Strut, Omar Musa, N'fa, Sky'High, Jimmy Nice, Tom Scott, Class A, Solo, P Smurf, Joyride and Joelistics.

== Collaborations ==
The Tongue recorded with Dudley Perkins, Ozi Batla, DJ Diaz, Bertie Blackman, Bag Raiders, Gift of Gab (Blackalicious), Katalyst, Braintax, Georgia Anne Muldrow, and Muph & Plutonic.

== Personal life ==
Shirley graduated from his Masters of Teaching degree in 2014, receiving qualifications to teach high school English and Geography. He began teaching at Sydney Boys High School in 2016, teaching English, History and Values Education. He also coached basketball there. He went on to teach English and English Extension at International Grammar School.

Shirley had an acting role in the 2019 feature documentary "Machine", a film about how the exponential growth of AI will change humanity in the next century.

Shirley has also been a professional DJ since 2021, playing under the name DJ Xolo. He headlined the main-stage for Sydney's Vivid Festival in 2024 and has enjoyed residencies at iconic Sydney venues such as Ivy Pool, The Dock, Buddy's Bar and The Lord Gladstone as well as playing interstate and internationally- including at Meeting of Styles in Copenhagen and co-headlining DJ Festival in Vanuatu.

== Discography ==
=== Singles ===
- "Joy" ft Inês – (2022)
- "Neck + Neck" – (2022)
- "Two Girlfriends" – (2022)
- "You Got Me" ft Mataya (2015)
- "Never Going Down" ft Ngaiire (2015)
- "Australian Dreaming" (2013)
- "Drums" (2013)
- "The Show" (2010)
- "Crazy" ft Joyride (2010)
- "Animal Crackers" ft Dudley Perkins and Georgia Anne Muldrow (2007)
- "Real Thing (2007)
- "The Punch" (2006)
- "Bad Education" (2006)

=== EPs ===
- Bad Education – Elefant Traks (2006)
- Victorious Remixes remix EP – Elefant Traks (2013)

=== Albums ===
- Shock & Awe – Elefant Traks (2007)
- Alternative Energy – Elefant Traks (2010)
- Surrender To Victory – Elefant Traks (2013)
- Hard Feelings – Elefant Traks (2015)
- Bloodwork: The Best of The Tongue (2022)

=== Mixtapes ===
- Redux – (2008)
- The Tongue is Dead – (2009)
- The Sextape – (2011)

=== Compilation appearances ===
- "Counterfeit Cheques" from Triple J Hip Hop Show – (2005)
- "Corruption Dub" from Trampled – The Elephant Traks Remix Album – Elefant Traks (2006)
- Elefant Traks 10th Anniversary Party DVD – Elefant Traks (2009)

=== Guest appearances ===
- "Wrong One" by Urthboy from The Signal – Elefant Traks (2007)
- "Catch of the Day Remix" by Bias B from Beemixes – Obese Records (2007)
- "All You Got Remix" by Katalyst from All You Got 12" – Invada Records (2007)
- "Superpowers" by Chasm from Beyond The Beat Tape – Obese Records (2008)
- "Today" by Muph & Plutonic from And Then Tomorrow Came – Obese Records (2009)
- "War of the Worlds" & "Award Show" by Astronomy Class from Pursuit of Happiness – Elefant Traks (2009)
- "City Glow" by Mr Hill from The Feedback – (2012)
- "Crossed Wires" by 1/6 from Electronic Mail – 2012
- "The Truth" by Chasm from This Is How We Never Die – Obese Records (2012)
- "Go Hard Or Go Home" by Sky'High from Forever Sky High – Elefant Traks (2012)
- "High On Life" by Bitter Belief from "The Gallery" – Bitter Belief (2013)
- "Whoodafunnk" by Beastside from The Prelude – (2013)
- "D.O.L" by Triple One (2017)
- "Cold Streets" by Beastside – (2024)
