= Smokey's Haunt =

Studio album by Urthboy
- Released: 12 October 2012
- Genre: Australian hip-hop
- Label: Elefant Traks
- Producer: Angus Stuart (aka El Gusto), Phillip Norman (aka Count Bounce)

Urthboy chronology
Spitshine (2009)	Smokey's Haunt (2012)	The Past Beats Inside Me Like a Second Heartbeat (2016)

Smokey's Haunt is the fourth studio album by Australian hip hop artist and member of The Herd, Urthboy. It was released on 12 October 2012.

== Overview ==
Levinson's fourth album under the Urthboy moniker, released on the Elefant Traks label, was made available to the public on 12 October 2012. Produced by fellow Australian hip hop colleagues Count Bounce (TZU) and Hermitude, the album was selected as a "Feature Album" on national Australian radio station Triple J.

Jimblah, Solo, Jane Tyrell and Alex Burnett (of Sparkadia) feature as guests on the album. Jimblah and Solo appear on a song entitled "On Your Shoulders" (Jimblah also appears on the song "Glimpses" with Tyrrell) and Burnett features on the song "The Big Sleep".

A remix EP, called "Smokey's Homies", released the following year on April 20 2013. The EP featured two remixes of Stories, one being an alternate version with extra verses from Mantra and Drapht and the other being a remix done by Jayteehazard, an Urthboy & Count Bounce remix of "When Yesterday's Gone" by indie pop band Hungry Kids of Hungary, two remixes of Knee Length Socks, both done by Trials, and a remix of The Big Sleep by Trailblazers. On some versions of the EP, two non-remix bonus tracks were also included; "Easy Baby" and "The Buck Stops Here".

== Tour ==
In late February 2013, a national Australian tour, in support of the fourth Urthboy album, was confirmed and a live band, featuring drums and keyboard(s)/piano(s), was also announced. The Herd member Jane Tyrell was also named as a member of the touring group, while the support acts were identified as fellow Elefant Traks artist Jimblah and One Sixth from Melbourne, Australia. In 2013 Urthboy was announced as the national support for Paul Kelly's 'Spring & Fall' Tour—the selection follows multiple previous collaborations, including Urthboy's 2008 cover of "From Little Things Big Things Grow", and a combined cover of Hunters and Collectors' "Tears Of Joy" in early 2013.

== Track listing ==
Smokey's Haunt
No.	Title	Length
1.	"Stories"	3:49
2.	"Naïve Bravado" (featuring Daniel Merriweather)	3:17
3.	"Cleopatra"	3:38
4.	"Clean Slate" (featuring Delta)	3:20
5.	"The Big Sleep" (featuring Alex Burnett)	5:19
6.	"On Your Shoulders" (featuring Solo and Jimblah)	4:49
7.	"Hey Dianne" (featuring Bobby Flynn)	4:27
8.	"Empire Tags"	3:51
9.	"Knee Length Socks"	4:04
10.	"Glimpses" (featuring Jane Tyrrell and Jimblah)	5:24
11.	"Calling Cards" (featuring Texture Like Sun and Ev Jones)	4:26
12.	"Orphan Rocker"	5:09

== Charts ==
Chart (2014)	Peak position
Australian Albums (ARIA)	14
