= Dark Night Sweet Light =

Studio album by Hermitude
- Released: 15 May 2015
- Recorded: 2013–2015
- Studios: The Cave, Leichhardt and the Den, Glebe, Australia
- Genres: Electronica, Australian hip-hop
- Length: 40:54
- Label: Elefant Traks
- Producers: Luke Dubber and Angus Stuart (Hermitude)

Hermitude chronology
Parallel Paradise (2012)	Dark Night Sweet Light (2015)	Pollyanarchy (2019)

Singles from Dark Night Sweet Light
- 1. "Through the Roof" Released: 21 January 2015; 2. "The Buzz" Released: 28 April 2015; 3. "Ukiyo" Released: July 2015; 4. "Searchlight" Released: August 2015

Dark Night Sweet Light is the fifth album from Australian hip hop duo Hermitude. It was released on 15 May 2015. The album peaked at number 1 on the ARIA Albums Chart.

Prior to its release, the duo said, "I feel like this record is more stripped back than a lot of music we've made before. It's not like James Blake minimal but it's definitely more simplified. The title is Dark Night Sweet Light [and] it's a night record, city lights, up moments but some melancholy drifts throughout".

At the AIR Awards of 2015, the album was nominated for Best Independent Album and Best Independent Dance/Electronic Album. At the ARIA Music Awards of 2015, the album was nominated for Album of the Year, Best Independent Release and Best Group, while Mitch Kenny was nominated for Engineer of the Year and Luke Dubber and Angus Stuart for Producer of the Year for their work on this album.

At the J Awards of 2015, the album was nominated for Australian Album of the Year.

== Track listing ==
Dark Night Sweet Light track listing
No.	Title	Length
1.	"Hijinx"	3:16
2.	"Through the Roof" (featuring Young Tapz)	3:09
3.	"Ukiyo"	3:47
4.	"Searchlight" (featuring Yeo)	3:55
5.	"Bermuda Bay"	4:06
6.	"Hazy Love"	3:58
7.	"The Buzz" (featuring Mataya and Young Tapz)	3:47
8.	"Metropolis"	3:40
9.	"Midnight Terrain"	4:29
10.	"Shift"	2:18
11.	"Searchlight (Reprise)" (featuring Yeo)	4:29
Total length:		40:54

== Charts ==
=== Weekly charts ===
Weekly chart performance for Dark Night Sweet Light
Chart (2015)	Peak position
Australian Albums (ARIA)	1
New Zealand Albums (RMNZ)	27

=== Year-end charts ===
Year-end chart performance for Dark Night Sweet Light
Chart (2015)	Position
Australian Albums (ARIA)	43

== Certifications ==
Certifications for Dark Night Sweet Light
Region	Certification	Certified units/sales
Australia (ARIA)	Gold	35,000^{^}
^{^} Shipments figures based on certification alone.

== Release history ==
Release history and formats for Dark Night Sweet Light
Country	Date	Format	Label	Catalogue
Australia	15 May 2015	CD; digital download; LP	Elefant Traks	ACE118/ACE121
North America	2015	CD; digital download; 2×LP (limited)	Nettwerk	31076 1
