= Distant Sense of Random Menace =

Studio album by Urthboy
- Released: 2004
- Genre: Australian hip-hop
- Length: 51:42
- Label: Elefant Traks
- Producers: Elgusto, Seed MC, Paul Johannessen, Realistix, Traksewt

Urthboy chronology
| Distant Sense of Random Menace (2004) | The Signal (2007) |

Professional ratings
Review scores
| Source | Rating |
|---|---|
| Rapreviews | 7/10 stars |

Distant Sense of Random Menace is the debut album from Australian hip-hop artist Urthboy. It was released on 9 August 2004. The album was features the production of Elgusto (Hermitude), Count Bounce (TZU) and The Herd. An extended 12” vinyl was also released featuring an exclusive remix by Hermitude. The album was mastered in Los Angeles by Dave Cooley (Madvillain, Madlib, Dangermouse).

The first song from the album was "No Rider", which was released together with a video made by Broken Yellow (directed by Brendan Doyle and producer by Navid Bahadori). The video for "No Rider" won the Sunscreen Music Video competition at the Festival of the Sun Music Festival (FOTSUN) and was placed third in the OzHipHop.com music video voting poll.

== Track listing ==
1. "Long Walk Home" - 3:42
2. "Keep It Relevant" - 5:01
3. "Come Around (feat. Seed MC)" - 3:31
4. "Heavy People (feat. Seed MC)" - 3:29
5. "Elektrik Shoks" - 4:37
6. "Media'd Out (feat. Mark Pearl)" - 4:19
7. "Urthy You'd be Better" - 0:18
8. "No Rider (feat. Toe-Fu)" - 3:58
9. "Natural Progression" - 5:10
10. "Distant Sense of Random Menace (feat. Toe-Fu)" - 5:30
11. "Sink In (feat. Toe-Fu)" - 4:09
12. "Whose Morals" - 4:16
13. "The Last Chance (feat. Ozi Batla)" - 3:42
