= Spitshine =

Studio album by Urthboy
- Released: 28 August 2009
- Genre: Australian hip-hop
- Label: Elefant Traks
- Producers: Angus Stuart (aka El Gusto), Phillip Norman (aka Count Bounce)

Urthboy chronology
The Signal (2007)	Spitshine (2009)	Smokey's Haunt (2012)

Singles from Spitshine
- 1. "Ready to Go" Released: 17 July 2009; 2. "Shruggin'" Released: 2009

Spitshine is the third studio album by Australian hip-hop artist and member of The Herd, Urthboy. It was released on 28 August 2009.

== Overview ==
The album was shortlisted for the 2009 Australian Music Prize, the second time Urthboy has been nominated, with The Signal being nominated in 2007.

I don't have any grand expectations so the fact that I am a nominee, I can very genuinely say, is my little victory.

— Tim Levinson

The first song lifted from the album was "Hellsong", was released as a free download from Urthboy's official website, in May 2009. The video for the song is composed of more than 7,000 hand-drawn images and animated in Sydney, Christchurch, London, Hungary and Oslo. It was directed by Brendan Doyle and produced by Navid Bahadori, for Broken Yellow. Broken Yellow were also the production company behind The Herd's video "I Was Only Nineteen". The video was selected as 'Indie Clip on the Week' on Rage. The second single, "Ready to Go", was released 17 July 2009. The video for which was directed by James Hackett and produced by Kala Ellis from Hackett Films. The video for a third song, "Shruggin", featuring Jane Tyrell (also a member of The Herd), was released in November 2009.

== Track listing ==
All tracks are written by Tim Levinson and Phillip Norman unless otherwise indicated

Spitshine
No.	Title	Writer(s)	Length
1.	"'Til They Snatch This Last Page"	Tim Levinson, Angus Stuart	3:31
2.	"Spitshine"	Tim Levinson, Angus Stuart	4:13
3.	"Served"		3:29
4.	"Ready to Go" (featuring Nat Dunn)		3:42
5.	"Hellsong"	Tim Levinson, Angus Stuart, Luke Dubber	3:59
6.	"Shruggin" (featuring Jane Tyrell)	Tim Levinson, Phillip Norman, Jane Tyrell	4:01
7.	"Above the Canopy"	Tim Levinson, Angus Stuart, Luke Dubber	4:33
8.	"Don't Sideline Me" (featuring Lior)	Tim Levinson, Angus Stuart, Luke Dubber, Lior Attar	4:03
9.	"Usher in the Cool" (featuring Mark Pearl)		5:05
10.	"Impossible Story"		5:37
11.	"Them Shackles" (featuring Jane Tyrell and Solo)	Tim Levinson, Angus Stuart	3:43
12.	"Fight Fire" (featuring Nay and Mantra)	Tim Levinson, Phillip Norman, Rob Tremlett, Joel Wenitong	4:37
13.	"2000 and Whatever"	Tim Levinson, Phillip Norman, Angus Stuart	2:22

== Charts ==
Chart performance for Spitshine
Chart (2009)	Peak position
Australian Albums (ARIA)	54
