= Parallel Paradise (EP) =

EP by Hermitude
- Released: 8 June 2012
- Label: Elefant Traks

Hermitude chronology
HyperParadise (2012)	Parallel Paradise (2012)	Dark Night Sweet Light (2015)

Parallel Paradise is the third extended play from Australian hip-hop duo Hermitude. It was released on 8 June 2012. The EP features remixes from the duo's HyperParadise album.

== Track listing ==
No.	Title	Length
1.	"Hyperparadise" (Flume remix)	4:28
2.	"Speak of the Devil" (M-Phazes remix)	4:01
3.	"All of You" (Sampology remix)	3:28
4.	"Hyperparadise" (Ta-Ku remix)	3:11
5.	"Golden" (Roleo remix)	3:47
6.	"Speak of the Devil" (Cam Bluff remix)	4:00

== Sales and certifications ==
Region	Certification	Certified units/sales
Australia (ARIA)	Platinum	70,000^{^}
^{^} Shipments figures based on certification alone.

== Release history ==
Country	Date	Format	Label	Catalogue
Various	8 June 2012	digital download	Elefant Traks	—
Australia	2013	LP	Elefant Traks	ACE079
