= Alleys to Valleys =

Studio album by Hermitude
- Released: 25 August 2003
- Recorded: Sound Heaven Studios
- Genre: Australian hip hop
- Length: 57:50
- Label: Elefant Traks/Inertia Distribution
- Producer: Elgusto, Luke Dubs

Hermitude chronology
Alleys to Valleys (2003)	Tales of the Drift (2005)

Professional ratings
Review scores
Source	Rating
Rapreviews	7/10 stars
Audio Lunchbox	2/5 stars

Alleys to Valleys is the debut album from Australian hip-hop artists Hermitude. It was released on 25 August 2003.

The album features Ozi Batla and Urthboy from The Herd and Joelistics from TZU on the title track "Alley to Valleys". John Stuart, Elgusto's dad, features under the alias Mango Chutney on "Splendid Isolation" and "Damn Man", whilst Aja Stuart, Elgusto's sister, plays keys on "Drunken Dub".

Alleys to Valleys was recorded and mixed by Hermitude and John Stuart at Sound Heaven Studios in Wentworth Falls.

The first single released was "Cave Styles", with the video, which was created by Broken Yellow Productions (Broken Yellow Productions is a film production duo of Brendon Doyle and Navid Bahadori), receiving airplay on rage and Channel V.

== Track listing ==
All tracks written by Hermitude.

1. "Massive Passive" – 5:21
2. "Imaginary Friends" – 4:51
3. "Splendid Isolation" – 4:16
4. "Alleys To Valleys" – 4:15
5. "Section Reckin" – 1:36
6. "Cave Styles" – 5:13
7. "Moth Journey" – 4:33
8. "Highway Burner" – 6:03
9. "Space Evaders" – 6:14
10. "Drunken Dub" – 1:26
11. "Damn Man" – 5:12
12. "Fire Up De Converters" – 5:27
13. "Gusto's Theme" – 3:23

== Release history ==
Country	Date	Format	Label	Catalogue
Australia	25 August 2003	CD	Elefant Traks	ACE010
Australia	April 2014	digital download; 2xLP (limited)	Elefant Traks	ACE010V
