= Jimblah =

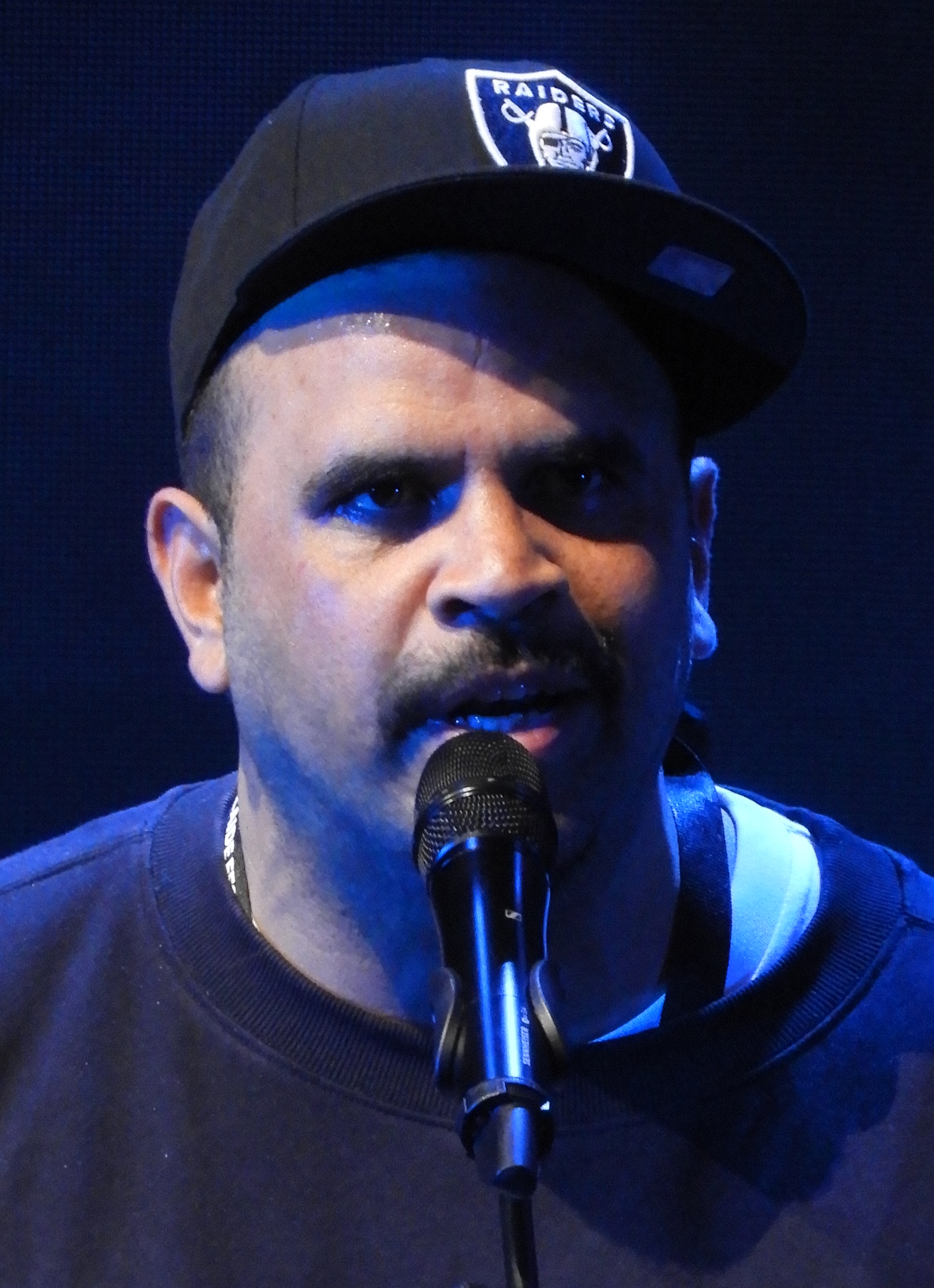
- Jimblah performs at Adelaide Festival 2021

Background information
- Born: James Alberts; Broome
- Genres: Hip hop
- Occupations: hip hop artist; musician; songwriter
- Instruments: Vocals; Keyboards; Production
- Years active: 2005–present
- Label: Elefant Traks

Jimblah (born James Alberts) is an Indigenous Australian hip hop artist from the Larrakia nation who lives in South Australia and tours nationally. He has released two solo albums and an album with his duo Homeward Bound. He is signed to the Elefant Traks label and has collaborated with many Australian artists including Coda Conduct, Horrorshow, The Tongue and Urthboy. Jimblah is also an advocate for indigenous music and indigenous rights.

== Music career ==
Jimblah began rapping and writing lyrics at the age of 12. Ten years later, he was awarded the Hilltop Hoods Initiative and began work on his first album. Face the Fire was released independently in 2011, and was re-released by Elefant Traks the following year after he signed to the label. His second album Phoenix was released in 2013. Jimblah has appeared as a guest vocalist on many other artists' releases. He has performed covers on Triple J's Like a Version including Matt Corby's "Resolution" and Marvin Gaye's "What's Goin' On?" and has been a Triple J Feature Artist of the Week.

=== Homeward Bound ===
Jimblah also raps and produces with his partner Goji (Georgia Humphreys) in a project called Homeward Bound. Homeward Bound's first album Whatever You Do, Don't Panic was released on Elefant Traks in 2019.

== Activism ==
Jimblah often makes strong social and political statements in his lyrics. An example of this is the single Black Life Matters, which features additional vocals from Ellie May and makes references to his great-grandmother, Hilda Muir. Muir campaigned for an apology to the Stolen Generations, of which she was a survivor, and while the apology was eventually delivered, her parallel campaign for reparations was unsuccessful. Jimblah has expressed his desire to pick up where his great-grandmother left off.

In 2019, Jimblah started a petition requesting for national broadcaster Triple J to start a First Nations music show. His lobbying led to the formation of the First Sounds: First Nations Collective for Traditional and Contemporary Music. Its members include high-profile artists such as Yothu Yindi, Shellie Morris, Thelma Plum, Emily Wurramara, Mojo Juju and Baker Boy's drummer Benny Clark. Jimblah has spoken out about racism in the Australian music industry and mentors emerging Indigenous hip hop artists.

== Discography ==
=== Studio albums ===
Title	Details
Face the Fire	Released: 2011; Label: Jimblah (JIMBLAH001); Format: CD, digital download
Phoenix	Released: October 2013; Label: Elefant Traks (ACE091); Format: CD, LP, digital download

== Awards ==
=== Fowler's Live Music Awards ===
The Fowler's Live Music Awards took place from 2012 to 2014 to "recognise success and achievement over the past 12 months [and] celebrate the great diversity of original live music" in South Australia. Since 2015 they're known as the South Australian Music Awards.

Year	Nominee / work	Award	Result (wins only)
2013	Jimblah	Best Hip Hop Artist	Won
