= HyperParadise =

Studio album by Hermitude
- Released: 3 February 2012
- Genre: Electronica, Australian hip-hop
- Label: Elefant Traks

Hermitude chronology
Threads (2008)	HyperParadise (2012)	Parallel Paradise (2012)

Singles from HyperParadise
- 1. "Get in My Life" Released: October 2010; 2. "Speak of the Devil" Released: 9 September 2011; 3. "HyperParadise" Released: 2012

HyperParadise is the fourth album from Australian hip-hop artists Hermitude. It was released on 3 February 2012.

At the J Awards of 2012, the album was nominated for Australian Album of the Year.

At the AIR Awards of 2012, the album won Best Independent Dance/Electronic Album.

== Singles ==
Three singles were released from HyperParadise. "Get in My Life", was released in November 2010. The second, "Speak of the Devil", was released on 9 September 2011. "Speak of the Devil" won the 2011 Triple J Award for Music Video of the Year. The same track scored number 44 on the 2011 Triple J Hottest 100. "HyperParadise" was released as the third and final single. A Flume remix saw the song peak at number 38 on the ARIA Charts, becoming the group's first charting single.

== Reception ==
Andrew Hickey from Beat described the album as "instantly listenable" and "epic". He states Hermitude has been able to "expertly weave through genres and influences to create a unique sound". The Orange Press described the album as "yet another quantum leap ahead". The review concludes by stating "if there's any justice, this album will be the one that finally launches them into the upper stratosphere of producers, both here and abroad". Dominic Sciberras from Purple Sneakers states Hermitude "utilize their wide array of skills to create a sophisticated yet immensely listener friendly record". He describes Hermitude as "happy doing their own thing" by "defying trends and ignoring hype".

== Track listing ==
No.	Title	Length
1.	"Engage"	2:49
2.	"Get in My Life"	3:30
3.	"All of You"	3:22
4.	"Speak of the Devil"	3:22
5.	"The Hunt"	4:40
6.	"Let You Go"	4:44
7.	"Hermilude"	0:57
8.	"HyperParadise"	4:02
9.	"The Villain"	3:01
10.	"Sloucho Darx"	4:13
11.	"Golden"	2:57
12.	"Cloud City"	4:53
13.	"Flood"	3:27

== Charts ==
Chart (2012)	Peak position
Australian Albums (ARIA)	37

== Certifications ==
Certifications and sales for HyperParadise
Region	Certification	Certified units/sales
New Zealand (RMNZ)	Gold	7,500^{‡}
^{‡} Sales+streaming figures based on certification alone.

== Release history ==
Country	Date	Format	Label	Catalogue
Various	3 February 2012	CD; digital download	Elefant Traks	ACE069
Australia	3 February 2012	2xLP	Elefant Traks	ACE071
