= The Buzz (song) =

- Remixes cover art

Single by Hermitude
- Released: April 2015
- Length: 3:34
- Label: Elefant Traks
- Songwriters: Luke Dubber; T. Levinson; G. Long; J Scott; Angus Stuart
- Producer: Hermitude

Hermitude singles chronology
"Through the Roof" (2015)	"The Buzz" (2015)	"Ukiyo" (2015)

"The Buzz" is a song recorded by Australian hip hop duo Hermitude featuring Sydney based artist Mataya and New Zealand artist Young Tapz. It was released in April 2015 as the second single from their fifth studio album, Dark Night Sweet Light. The song peaked at number 20 on the ARIA Charts and was certified platinum. It poled at number 8 in the Triple J's Hottest 100 of 2015.

At the APRA Music Awards of 2016, the song was nominated for Urban Work of the Year.

== Reception ==
Howles and Echos said "It begins innocuously enough, mashing Mataya’s muted, soft vocals with a quiet, throbbing synth. This flows into Young Tapz injection of Aussie hip-hop, raising the intensity ever slightly. However, it is the euphoric, filthy drop that comes out of nowhere that elevates the song into one of Hermitude's greatest tracks."

== Track listing ==
- Digital download
1. "The Buzz" – 3:42
- The Buzz (remixes) Digital download
1. "The Buzz" (Paces remix) – 3:58
2. "The Buzz" (Sweater Beats remix) – 3:25
3. "The Buzz" (Alison Wonderland remix) – 3:45
4. "The Buzz" (Sticky remix) – 4:49

== Charts ==
=== Weekly charts ===
Weekly chart performance for "The Buzz"
Chart (2015)	Peak position
Australia (ARIA)	20
US Hot Dance/Electronic Songs (Billboard)	13

=== Year-end charts ===
Year-end chart performance for "The Buzz"
Chart (2015)	Position
Australia (ARIA)	100
Australian Artist (ARIA)	14

== Certifications ==
Region	Certification	Certified units/sales
Canada (Music Canada)	Gold	40,000^{‡}
^{^} Shipments figures based on certification alone.
