= Exit Strategy =

An exit strategy is a means of leaving one's current situation.

Exit Strategy or Exit Plan may also refer to:

== Business ==
- Exit planning, preparation for departure of company founder

== Film and television ==
- "Exit Strategy" (Charmed), season 3, episode 20 (May 3, 2001)
- "Exit Strategy" (Arrested Development), season 3, episode 12 (February 10, 2006)
- Exit Strategy (film), 2012 American romantic comedy
- Exit Plan (2013 film), American prison action thriller, released as Escape Plan
- "eXit strategy", season 1, episode 4 (October 23, 2017) of The Gifted
- Exit Plan (film), 2019 Danish-Norwegian-German mystery drama

== Music ==
- Exit Strategy (album), 2006 debut by Australian hip hop group Astronomy Class

== Novels ==
- "Exit Strategy", fifteenth chapter of Tara Duncan and the Spellbinders (2003) by Sophie Audouin-Mamikonian
- Exit Strategy, 2007 Nadia Stafford mystery by Kelley Armstrong
