= Jesswar =

- Born: 1994 or 1995 (age 31–32); Canberra, Australia
- Genre: Hip hop
- Occupation: Artist
- Labels: Golden Era Records; PIAS Recordings

Jesswar is a Fijian Australian artist based on Yugambeh/Kombumerri country. Jesswar's debut single, "Savage", released in 2017 and was followed by debut EP Tropixx in 2021 and debut mixtape LIFE'S SHORT, LIVE BIG in 2022. In 2021, Jesswar was a winner at the Queensland Music Awards and the APRA Professional Development Awards.

== Early life ==
Born in Canberra, Jesswar grew up partly in Fiji and partly on the Gold Coast, Queensland. He left home at 16 years old, studying music at TAFE Queensland, and later at the Queensland Conservatorium Griffith University. In 2012 Jesswar formed a four-piece pop rap band, Sneeky Picnic, with fellow students.

== Music career ==
=== 2017-present: TROPIXX & Life’s Short, Live Big ===
Jesswar's first release as a solo artist was "Savage" in 2017, though he later signed with Golden Era Records. In 2018 Jesswar performed at St Jerome's Laneway Festival. By 2019, he had collaborated with artists including Tasha the Amazon, Okenyo, DZ Deathrays, and B Wise.

In 2021, Jesswar signed a global deal with PIAS Recordings and also released debut EP Tropixx. The EP the singles "Medusa" and "Venom", the latter of which won in the hip hop/rap category at the 2021 Queensland Music Awards. Later that year, he released the lead single from his debut mixtape: a Rihanna-inspired collaboration with viral Texan rapper Erica Banks: "Bad Like Riri". The single gained significant traction and is trap-laced celebration of strong, unapologetic voices and the self-possessed mindset of a baddie.

In September 2022, Jesswar released his debut mixtape, Life's Short, Live Big.

== Personal life ==
Jesswar is a trans man and uses he/him pronouns.

== Discography ==
=== Mixtapes ===
Title	Details
Life’s Short, Live Big	Released: 23 September 2022; Label: PIAS Recordings; Formats: CD, Digital

=== Extended play ===
Title	Details
TROPIXX	Released: 5 March 2021; Label: PIAS Recordings; Formats: CD, Digital

== Awards and nominations ==
=== AIR Awards ===
The Australian Independent Record Awards (commonly known informally as AIR Awards) is an annual awards night to recognise, promote and celebrate the success of Australia's Independent Music sector.

Year	Nominee / work	Award	Result	Ref.
2022	Tropixx	Best Independent Hip Hop Album or EP	Nominated	
2023	Life's Short, Live Big	Best Independent Hip Hop Album or EP	Won	

=== National Live Music Awards ===
The National Live Music Awards (NLMAs) commenced in 2016 to recognise contributions to the live music industry in Australia.

Year	Nominee / work	Award	Result	Ref.
2023	Jesswar	Best Live Voice in QLD	Nominated	

=== Rolling Stone Australia Awards ===
The Rolling Stone Australia Awards are awarded annually in January or February by the Australian edition of Rolling Stone magazine for outstanding contributions to popular culture in the previous year.

Year	Nominee / work	Award	Result	Ref.
2022	Jesswar	Best New Artist	Nominated	
