= The Signal (Urthboy album) =

Studio album by Urthboy
- Released: 2007
- Recorded: Sound Heaven Studios, The Container
- Genre: Australian hip-hop
- Length: 56.3 mins
- Label: Elefant Traks
- Producer: Urthboy, El Gusto, Count Bounce

Urthboy chronology
Distant Sense of Random Menace (2004)	The Signal (2007)	Spitshine (2009)

Professional ratings
Review scores
Source	Rating
Rapreviews	9/10 stars

The Signal is the second album from The Herd member Urthboy and was released on 14 July 2007. The album features production from Australian artists El Gusto of Hermitude fame and Count Bounce from TZU. It also features collaborations from several prominent Australian MCs and Musicians. The album was released on CD and double vinyl.

At the J Awards of 2007, the album was nominated for Australian Album of the Year. In receiving the nomination Levinson stated:

'I'm terribly pleased to be nominated for the 2007 J Award and I didn't expect it at all – so that's especially cool. Triple J are still the strongest source of consistent radio support for independent music in Australia alongside community radio. Triple J's influence is felt throughout this big country and we're indebted to the passion of the people at the station.

At the AIR Awards of 2007, the album was nominated for awards. and in November 2007 was nominated for Triple J's J Award.

The album was selected as a feature record on Triple J, Groove FM (Perth), PBS and received significant airplay on FBi Radio, 4ZZZ and other community radio stations across Australia.

The first single from the album was "We Get Around", which was released together with a video made by Broken Yellow (directed by Brendan Doyle and producer by Navid Bahadori). Broken Yellow were also the production company behind The Herd's video "I Was Only Nineteen". "We Get Around" received significant airplay on Triple J and reached #25 on Triple J's Hottest 100 for 2007. It currently features in a commercial television advertisement for the Victorian State Government's M1 Upgrade.

== Track listing ==
All tracks written by (Tim Levinson and P. Norman) unless otherwise indicated.

1. "The Signal" – 3:53
2. "Nothing I'd Rather Do" (featuring Hau and Muph) (T. Levinson, A. Stuart, L. Dubber, H. Latukefu, D. Young) – 3:51
3. "To The Bank" – 4:02
4. "We Get Around" (T. Levinson, A. Stuart) – 3:50
5. "The Clocks" (featuring Mark Pearl) – 6:03
6. "I Forgot To Say – 4:18
7. "Over Before It Began" (featuring Mia Dyson) (T. Levinson, P. Norman, M. Dyson) – 3:52
8. "The Wrong One" (featuring Ozi Batla and The Tongue) (T. Levinson, A. Stuart, S. Kennedy, X. Shirley) – 4:53
9. "Black Dog" – 3:39
10. "Hold Court" (featuring Radical Son (T. Levinson, A. Stuart) – 3:51
11. "Modern Day Folk" – 4:42
12. "Megaphone Stallone" (T. Levinson, A. Stuart) – 4:56
13. "No Other" (featuring Mark Pearl) – 4:33
14. "Lightbulbs" (iTunes Store bonus track)

== Guest artists ==
- Hau from Koolism, MC on Nothing I'd Rather Do
- Muph from Muph & Plutonic, MC on Nothing I'd Rather Do
- Mark Pearl, vocals on The Clocks and No Other
- Mia Dyson, vocals on Over Before It Began
- Ozi Batla from The Herd, MC on The Wrong One
- The Tongue, MC on The Wrong One
- Radical Son, vocals on Hold Court

== Charts ==
Chart performance for The Signal
Chart (2007)	Peak position
Australian Albums (ARIA)	65
