= Tales of the Drift =

Studio album by Hermitude
- Released: 1 August 2005
- Recorded: Sound Heaven Studios
- Genre: Australian hip hop
- Label: Elefant Traks/Inertia Distribution
- Producer: Elgusto, Luke Dubs

Hermitude chronology
Alleys to Valleys (2004)	Tales of the Drift (2005)	Threads (2008)

Professional ratings
Review scores
Source	Rating
Illawarra Mercury	positive
The Cairns Post	4/5 stars
The Advertiser	4/5 stars
Sunday Telegraph	3.5/5 stars

Tales of the Drift is the second album from Australian hip-hop artists Hermitude. It was released on 1 August 2005.

The album features Ozi Batla and Urthboy from The Herd on the track "Fallen Giants" and MC Blu on the track "Music from the Mind". Artwork designed by Kaho Cheung (aka Unkle Ho - The Herd) and was released on CD and as a double vinyl album.

Tales of the Drift was recorded and mixed by Hermitude and John Stuart at Sound Heaven Studios in Wentworth Falls.

The first single released was "Fallen Giants" which receiving significant airplay on Triple J, with the song being included on Triple J's compilation album Home & Hosed - Ripe & Ready.

== Track listing ==
All tracks written by Hermitude.

1. "You Got Soul" - 1:31
2. "Tapedeck Sound" - 6:05
3. "Can’t Stop" - 5:37
4. "Music From The Mind" - 3:15
5. "Nightfall's Messenger" - 4:36
6. "Plunge" - 1:50
7. "Observation Deck" - 5:06
8. "Zacktor" - 5:08
9. "Galactic Cadillac" - 3:52
10. "Fallen Giants" - 4:18
11. "Dub's Theme" - 4:08
12. "Madness in G Minor" - 4:22
13. "Ruffwon" - 5:37
14. "The Drift" - 4:31
15. "Mystical Herm's" - 4:02

== Release history ==
Country	Date	Format	Label	Catalogue
Australia	1 August 2005	CD; digital download	Elefant Traks	ACE019
Australia	1 August 2005	2xLP	Elefant Traks	ACE020V
