= L-FRESH the Lion =

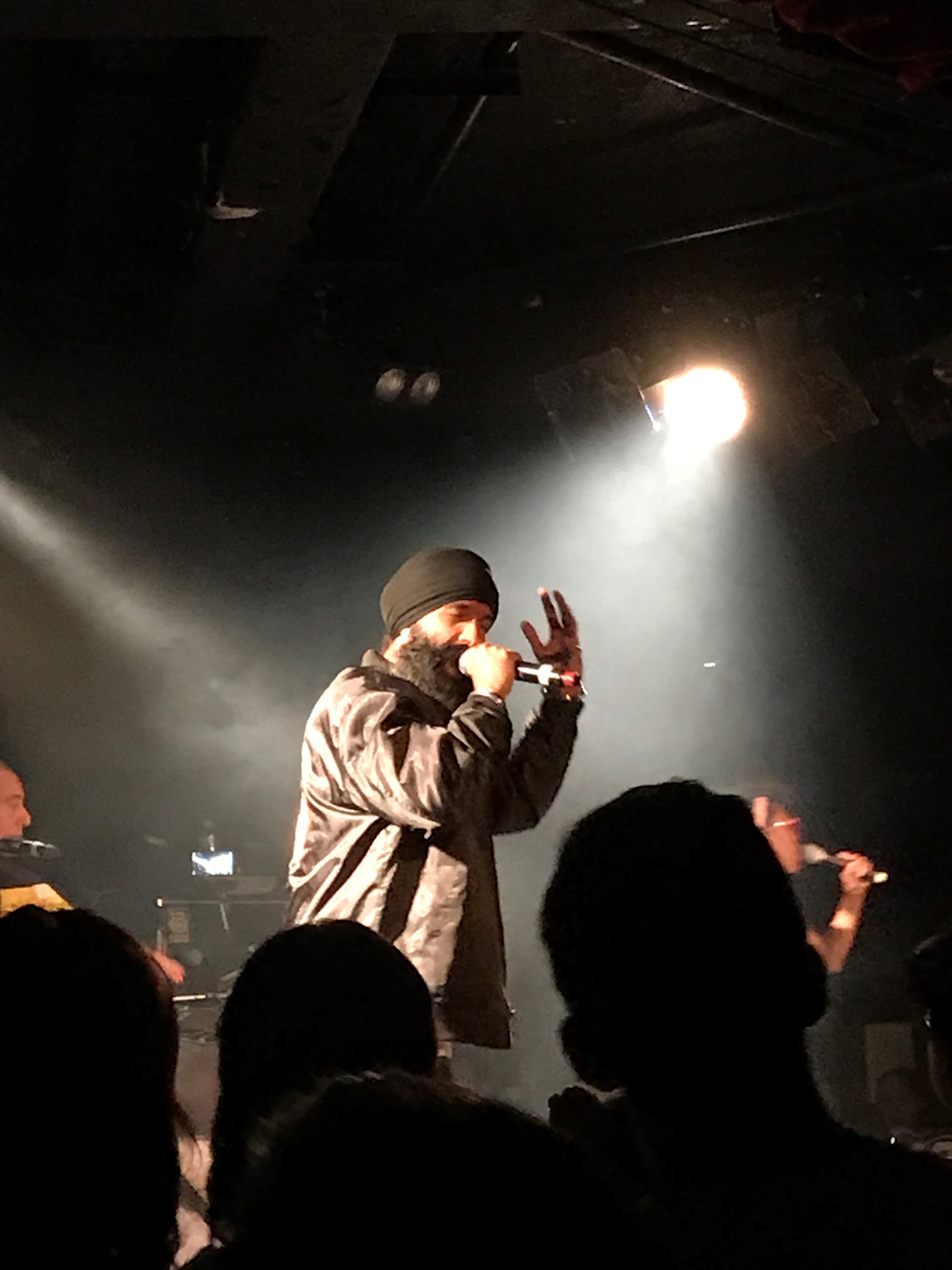
- L-FRESH the Lion performing at the Corner Hotel in 2018

Background information
- Born: Sukhdeep Singh Bhogal; Liverpool, New South Wales, Australia
- Origin: South Western Sydney, Australia
- Genres: Hip hop
- Occupations: Rapper, musician, producer, songwriter
- Instruments: Vocals, sampler
- Years active: 2009–present
- Label: Elefant Traks
- Website: l-fresh.com

Sukhdeep Singh Bhogal l better known by his stage name L-FRESH the Lion, is an Australian hip hop artist and producer. Based in South Western Sydney, Bhogal has released four studio albums as L-FRESH the Lion, highlighted by 2016's ARIA Award-nominated Become. He has also received three nominations at the National Live Music Awards. Bhogal's stage name is derived from a backronym for FRESH—Forever Rising Exceeding Sudden Hardships—while the L and lion refer to the Sanskrit translation for his middle name, Singh, which is given to Sikh men. He has been described as one of Australia's most important rappers.

== Early life and education ==
Bhogal was born in Liverpool, New South Wales to Sikh parents from India. He grew up in South Western Sydney, speaking Punjabi at home but English at school.

== Music career ==
L-FRESH the Lion first caught the attention of his peers and the Australian music scene in 2009 when he supported Nas during his first headline tour of Australia. In 2012, he released his first long-play record, The Lion Speaks.

In May 2014, L-FRESH the Lion released One, which was promoted as his debut studio album. He then signed a record deal with Elefant Traks in early 2015. His follow-up album, Become, was released in May 2016 and peaked at number 55 on the ARIA Charts. At the ARIA Music Awards of 2016, it was nominated for Best Urban Album.

In 2017 and 2018, L-FRESH the Lion was selected by YouTube to be an Australian representative for their global Creators for Change initiative. His music video "Raci$t / Our World" premiered at the Tribeca TV Festival alongside two other Creators for Change projects. He then went on to perform the song at YouTube's Brandcast event held in Sydney at the Hordern Pavilion, which was headlined by a performance from Sir Elton John. L-FRESH the Lion's 2018 Creators for Change project, a short documentary called Culture Strong, won Best Editor and Runner-up Best in the West at the Made in the West Film Festival, while also being nominated for Best Director, Best Cinematographer and Best Sound Design. L-FRESH the Lion closed out his 2018 involvement with the Creators for Change initiative by performing "Our World" at the United Nations Headquarters in New York as part of an educational event in observance of the International Day for Tolerance. L-FRESH the Lion was selected as part of the five-person Australian jury at the Eurovision Song Contest 2018.

In 2019, the Sydney Kings basketball franchise enlisted L-FRESH the Lion to write and perform their team song. "We the Kings" was released before the launch of the 2019–20 National Basketball League season and performed for the first time by L-FRESH the Lion in front of a record-breaking crowd at Qudos Bank Arena.

At the height of the COVID-19 pandemic in Australia in July 2020, L-FRESH the Lion released his third album, South West. It was ranked at number 13 in Double J's 50 best albums of 2020 and led to his nomination as Double J's 2020 Australian Artist of the Year. The 14-track album is a letter to Bhogal's younger 13-year-old self, with messages of confidence, appreciation of his Sikh and Punjabi cultural background, self-empowerment and decolonisation.

In 2022, Bhogal made his acting debut in an episode of the ABC TV program Summer Love.

== Business career ==
L-FRESH the Lion is the founder and artist director of Conscious, an annual year-long hip-hop artist development program run by Campbelltown Arts Centre. The program supports the development and career pathways of socially minded hip hop artists with connections to Western Sydney. Since 2018, the program has worked with artists such as A.Girl, Becca Hatch, Jessica Jade, Nardean, Mirrah, Spvrrow, Slim Set and T Breezy.

== Influences ==
L-FRESH the Lion cites the work of Tupac Shakur as influential, both on his music and in contributing to the development of his awareness of his Sikh heritage.

== Discography ==
=== Studio albums ===
Title	Details	Peak chart positions
Title	Details	AUS
The Lion Speaks	Released: March 2012; Label: Self-released; Format: Digital download	—
One	Released: May 2014; Label: Vienna People Records (VPR001); Format: CD, digital download	—
Become	Released: 12 May 2016; Label: Elefant Traks (ACE144); Format: CD, digital download	55
South West	Released: 17 July 2020; Label: Elefant Traks _{(ACE238)}; Format: Vinyl, streaming, digital download	—

=== Extended plays ===
Title	Details
Wide Awake	Released: 2009; Label: Independent; Format: digital download
Waiting	Released: 2011; Label: Independent; Format: CD, digital download

== Awards and nominations ==
=== ARIA Music Awards ===
The Australian Recording Industry Association Music Awards (commonly known informally as ARIA Music Awards or ARIA Awards) is an annual series of awards nights celebrating the Australian music industry, put on by the Australian Recording Industry Association (ARIA).

Year	Nominee / work	Award	Result
2016	Become	Best Urban Album	Nominated

=== AIR Awards ===
The Australian Independent Record Awards (commonly known informally as AIR Awards) is an annual awards night to recognise, promote and celebrate the success of Australia's Independent Music sector.

Year	Nominee / work	Award	Result
2014	One	Best Independent Hip Hop Album	Nominated
2017	Become	Best Independent Hip Hop Album	Nominated

=== Environmental Music Prize ===
The Environmental Music Prize is a quest to find a theme song to inspire action on climate and conservation. It commenced in 2022.

Year	Nominee / work	Award	Result	Ref.
2022	"Mother" (featuring Moza and Mirrah)	Environmental Music Prize	Nominated	

=== J Awards ===
The J Awards are an annual series of Australian music awards that were established by the Australian Broadcasting Corporation's youth-focused radio station Triple J. They commenced in 2005.

Year	Nominee / work	Award	Result
2020	L-FRESH the Lion	Double J Australian Artist of the Year	Nominated

=== Music Victoria Awards ===
The Music Victoria Awards are an annual awards night celebrating Victorian music. They commenced in 2006.

Year	Nominee / work	Award	Result	Ref.
2014	One	Best Hip Hop Album	Nominated	

=== National Live Music Awards ===
The National Live Music Awards (NLMAs) are a broad recognition of Australia's diverse live industry, celebrating the success of the Australian live scene. The awards commenced in 2016.

Year	Nominee / work	Award	Result
2016	L-FRESH the Lion	Live Hip Hop Act of the Year	Nominated
2017	L-FRESH the Lion	Live Hip Hop Act of the Year	Nominated
2020	L-FRESH the Lion	Musicians Making a Difference	Nominated
