= Tapz =

TAPZ GALLANTINO
- Born: Tapiwa Mutingwende; 19 October 1995 (age 31); Wedza District, Zimbabwe
- Genres: R&B; Hip hop
- Occupations: Singer; record producer
- Years active: 2015–present
- Label: TAPZ GALLANTINO

Tapz Gallantino, (born Tapiwa Mutingwende) . He won the MTV Europe Music Award for best New Zealand act in November 2017. He performed at the ARIA Music Awards of 2015. The entertainer has shared the stage with performers such as Lorde, Banks, G-Eazy, Lunice, ASAP Ferg, Danny Brown, Jeremih and Hermitude.

== Background ==
Tapz migrated to New Zealand when he was 10 years old, then migrated to the US when he was 19.

== Discography ==
=== Extended plays ===
Title	Album details
Beautiful Nightmare	Released: 24 November 2017; Label: TAPZ GALLANTINO 100s + 1000s; Format: Digital download

=== Singles ===
- "Killa" (2017) (produced by Mzwetwo, Tapz & JRMN) (#2 Spotify USA Viral Charts, No. 3 Spotify Global Viral Charts)
- "Shadow" (2017) (#20 AUS, No. 1 BELIZE)
- "The Buzz" Hermitude featuring Mataya & Young Tapz (2015) (#20 AUS, No. 13 USA [Hot Dance/Electronic Songs])

== Awards and nominations ==
=== ARIA Music Awards ===
The ARIA Music Awards is an annual awards ceremony that recognises excellence, innovation, and achievement across all genres of Australian music. They commenced in 1987.

Year	Nominee / work	Award	Result	Ref.
2015	Kess Broekman-Dattner for Hermitude featuring Young Tapz "Through the Roof"	Best Video	Nominated	
