= Hoopla Doopla! =

Australian children's television series

- Genre: Children's television, comedy
- Created by: Melinda Wearne, Ron Saunders
- Written by: John Armstrong
- Directed by: Mark Barnard, Liang Tong
- Starring: Daniel Gorski; Kate Wright; Simon Wright; Zie Ning; Liu Wanting; Zhang Haoran
- Narrated by: Zindzi Okenyo (English); Cheng Qian (Mandarin)
- Composer: Scott Collins
- Countries of origin: Australia; China
- Original languages: English; Chinese
- No. of seasons: 1
- No. of episodes: 52

Production
- Executive producers: Li Congda; Simon Hopkinson; Bernadette O'Mahony; Ron Saunders
- Producers: Melinda Wearne, Zhao Qian, Ron Saunders
- Production location: China
- Cinematography: Li Shunbo
- Running time: 12 min.
- Production companies: The Content Agency; Beyond Screen Production; China Television Drama Production Centre

Original release
- Network: ABC TV, CCTV
- Release: 10 February 2014

Hoopla Doopla! (stylised all lower case; Chinese: 奇妙小镇) is a joint Australian-Chinese live-action non-verbal children's TV series, which was first broadcast from February 2014. It was created by Melinda Wearne and Ron Saunders using cast and production teams from both countries. It was co-directed by Mark Barnard and Liang Tong. The series was filmed during six months up to late 2013, using a 2250 square metre studio, "about the size of a football field" containing the fictional town of Hoopla. Producers were Wearne (of The Content Agency) and Saunders (Beyond Screen Production) for Australian Broadcasting Corporation (ABC) and Zhao Qian for China Central Television (CCTV).

The studio was located outside the Chinese city of Zhuozhou – two hours south-west of capital Beijing. Post-production occurred in Australia. Hoopla Doopla! targets children from the age of three to seven. Its on-screen cast of six characters are Jango (Daniel Gorski), Mimi (Kate Wright), Zap (Simon Wright), Bop (Xie Ning), Squidgie (Liu Wanting) and Ziggy (Zhang Haoran). They are augmented by an off-screen Narrator (Zindzi Okenyo). It began broadcast by ABC from 10 February 2014 and by CCTV from mid-February, for 52 episodes of 12 minutes each.

== Premise ==
Hoopla Doopla! details the daily lives of six residents of Hoopla. Jango is a street sweeper and clown; Ziggy is a magician who owns a shop; Bop, a mechanic and strongman, tries to fix broken devices; Squidgie, a contortionist, grows various plants in a garden; Mimi cooks for the townsfolk while juggling and Zap is an acrobat who delivers packages to the residents. Typically one or more person has a problem, which is tackled with assistance from the others. All matters are resolved without any dialogue – communication is through non-verbal cues including acrobatics, facial expressions and body language. Explanations for the audience are provided by the unseen Narrator.

== Cast ==
Credits:

- Daniel Gorski as Jango: street sweeper, clown
- Kate Wright as Mimi: cafe owner/cook, juggler
- Simon Wright as Zap: delivery person, acrobat
- Xie Ning as Bop: mechanic, strongman
- Liu Wanting as Squidgie: gardener, contortionist
- Zhang Haoran as Ziggy: shop owner, magician
- Zindzi Okenyo as English Narrator: provides running description of events in English
- Cheng Qian as Mandarin Narrator: provides running description of events in Mandarin

== Production ==
Creator of Hoopla Doopla! Melinda Wearne pitched her idea to ABC's Children's Television department via a pilot episode. It was decided to approach Ron Saunders of Beyond Screen Production who recommended the China Television Drama Production Centre of CCTV to develop another joint production with ABC. The two networks had previously co-produced a live-action children's television series, Magic Mountain (1997–1998). Wearne found casting of the roles to be difficult, each needed "a high level of physical skill and be able to act." As the set was in a remote area of China the Australians would be "a long way from home, we finished work late, the conditions were not great and they would not have people they could chat to." The three Australian on-screen cast members are all circus performers, both Gorsky and Simon had graduated from National Institute of Circus Arts, while Kate had joined Cirkidz at the age of seven. The episodes were co-directed by Mark Barnard of Australia and Liang Tong of China.

== Episodes ==
Episode list:

1. "Upsy Daisy!"
2. "Big Squidgie"
3. "Shadowplay"
4. "Zap's Alarm Clock"
5. "Mimi's Big Surprise"
6. "Hiccups"
7. "The Dough Monster"
8. "Squidgie's Day Off"
9. "Snow Business"
10. "Squidgie's Picnic"
11. "Sticky Situation"
12. "Jango the Joker"
13. "Magic Coat"
14. "Mimi's Perfect Pie"
15. "Zap's Special Delivery"
16. "Hula Hoopla"
17. "Bop's Clumsy Day"
18. "Zap Gets Stuck"
19. "Tomato Trouble"
20. "Midnight Muncher"
21. "Ziggy's Hidden Talent"
22. "Bop and the Butterfly"
23. "Sick Story"
24. "Trading Places"
25. "Sporty Jango"
26. "Dinosaur"
27. "Jango's Big Clean Up"
28. "Happy Snaps"
29. "The Lost Thing"
30. "Moonwalk"
31. "Jango the Genie"
32. "Treasure Map"
33. "Squidgie's Plant"
34. "Ziggy Goes Camping"
35. "The Smell"
36. "Zap's Whistle"
37. "Swap Shop"
38. "The Ziggy Hop"
39. "Ziggy's Hat Trick"
40. "Bop and the Clock"
41. "Ziggy the Invisible"
42. "The Robot"
43. "The Magic Pumpkin"
44. "The Hungry Dragon"
45. "In a Fix"
46. "Best Friends Day"
47. "King Jango"
48. "Hoopla Fire Brigade"
49. "The Sneaky Snacker"
50. "Mimi's Holiday"
51. "Squidgie's Present"
52. "Ziggy the Hero"

== Releases ==
- Hoopla Doopla! Happy Snaps (2014) – Roadshow Entertainment (R-114962-9) (contains episodes 1–4, 6–7, 28)
- Hoopla Doopla! Hula Hoopla. (2015) – Roadshow Entertainment (R-122354-9) (episodes 9–16)
- Hoopla Doopla! Best Friends Day (2015) – Roadshow Entertainment (R-122995-9) (episodes 17–23, 46)
- Hoopla Doopla! Ziggy the Hero! (2016) – Roadshow Entertainment (R-123612-9) (episodes 24–26, 29, 38–39, 41, 52)

== Awards and nominations ==
At the 2014 AWGIE Awards episode 9 "Snow Business" won Children's Television (P Classification) category, while episode 16 "Hula Hoopla" was nominated for the same.
