= One Day (Australian band) =

Australian hip hop collective

- Origin: Australia
- Genres: Australian hip hop
- Years active: 2012–present
- Labels: Elefant Traks
- Past members: Adit Gauchan, Nick Bryant-Smith, Nick Lupi, Jimmy Nice, Jackie Onassis, Raphael Dixon, Rowan Dix

One Day are an Australian hip hop collective consisting of Horrorshow, Spit Syndicate, Jackie Onassis and Joyride. The collective have released one studio album which peaked at number 2 on the Australian charts.

== History ==
One Day began as a podcast titled One Day Radio, where four individual artists would contribute. This led to a monthly event in Sydney in 2013.

In 2013, Jimmy Nice from Spit Syndicate said "We all grew up together, went to school together and make music together. We really want to strengthen that connection and have it more as a collective as appeased to four different acts. These guys are family and people we see on the reg, it's not just different acts coming together, we all share a strong bond. Anything we can do to strength that brand is a positive."

Following the release of the single "Love Me Less" in June 2014, One Day released their debut album, Mainline, on 1 August 2014 through Elefant Traks. The album peaked at number 2 on the ARIA Charts. The release was followed by a national Australian tour commencing in September 2014 where all seven members of One Day appeared on stage for the first time.

== Discography ==
=== Studio albums ===
List of studio albums, with release date and label shown
Title	Album details	Peak chart positions
Title	Album details	AUS
Mainline	Released: August 2014; Label: Elefant Traks (ONEDAY001); Format: CD, LP, digital download, streaming	2
