= Urthboy =

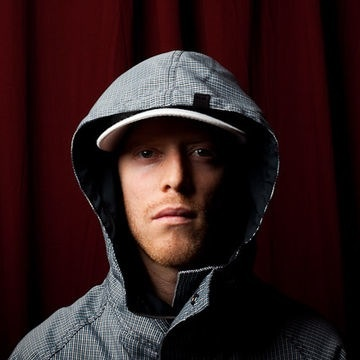

Background information
- Also known as: Urthboy
- Born: Tim Levinson; Sydney, New South Wales, Australia
- Genre: Hip-hop
- Years active: 1998–present
- Label: Elefant Traks
- Website: Official webpage

Tim Levinson, better known by the stage name Urthboy, is an Australian hip-hop MC and producer from New South Wales. He is widely known for his solo music under the moniker Urthboy, as a founding member of the hip-hop group The Herd, and for co-founding and managing the Elefant Traks record label. Levinson has released six solo albums: Distant Sense of Random Menace (2004), The Signal (2007), Spitshine (2009), Smokey's Haunt (2012), The Past Beats Inside Me Like a Second Heartbeat (2016) and Savour (2023); as well as five studio albums with The Herd.

== Early life ==
With origins in Wentworth Falls, a town in the Blue Mountains area of New South Wales, Levinson's interest in music began at an early age, when he was exposed to a broad range of musical styles, many of which were introduced to him by his older brother, Matthew. The Run DMC album Tougher Than Leather was the first influential hip-hop record for Levinson

== Music career ==
=== Explanetary ===
In 1998, Levinson co-formed Explanetary in Wentworth Falls with local friends Realistix, Elgusto and Luke Dubs, who played keys and drums respectively, while Levinson delivered the vocals. The band also included Realistix on vocals and production, No Mumbles (a.k.a. Nugs) on vocals, Aja Stuart on bass and DJ Alf. Explanetary released the In on the Deal EP through Elefant Traks in July 2001. The EP was one of the label's first releases, but was the band's only recording before the act disbanded. Despite the end of Explanetary, many subsequent collaborations have occurred, including "Fallen Giants", from 2005's Tales of the Drift.

By the time he completed high school, Levinson relocated to New South Wales' capital city, Sydney. While in his new environment, Levinson proceeded to form the Australian hip-hop band The Herd, alongside eight other artists, while Elgusto and Luke Dubs formed Hermitude and later joined the Elefant Traks label. Levinson also developed his solo hip-hop production and MC work, created under his moniker in the Herd, "Urthboy".

=== The Herd ===
Alongside Kenny Sabir, Levinson is one of the key co-founding members of The Herd, an Australian hip-hop outfit. Levinson is one of the group's two MCs—the other is Shannon Kennedy, who uses the moniker "Ozi Batla". Unusual for a hip-hop group, the Herd consists of a full live band as well as MCs: in addition to Levinson and Kennedy, Unkle Ho (beats), Sabir/Traksewt (accordion, clarinet and beats), Sulo (beats and guitar), Byron/Toe-Fu (guitar), Dale/Rok Poshtya (bass), and singer Jane Tyrrell complete the line-up. Their songs often feature politically oriented lyrics.

=== 2004–2006: Solo career and Distant Sense of Random Menace ===
In 2004, Levinson released his first Urthboy solo album, Distant Sense of Random Menace. The album was a success and featured songs such as "Come Around" and "No Rider". Urthboy toured the album nationally with Elgusto as DJ and Ozi Batla as co-MC. The music video for "No Rider", directed by Broken Yellow, won the Sunscreen Music Video Award at the Festival of the Sun Music Festival (FOTSUN) in 2005.

=== 2007–2008: The Signal ===
After the success of his debut album, Urthboy headed into the studio in 2007 to record his sophomore release, The Signal, with Pip Norman/Count Bounce (TZU) and Elgusto (Hermitude). The album was released in July 2007 to much critical praise and cemented Urthboy's place in the growing Australian hip-hop scene.

The first single, "We Get Around", was hailed as "a classic" by Rolling Stone and reached No. 25 on Triple J's Hottest 100 for 2007. The album received two nominations at the AIR Awards of 2007, a nomination at the J Awards of 2007 and was shortlisted in the prestigious Australian Music Prize (Best Album 2007). The album was licensed to Motivo Records, and was released internationally in late 2007. Urthboy toured Malaysia and Japan in 2008 before resuming work with The Herd in Australia.

In 2008, as a part of The GetUp Mob, organised by the advocacy group GetUp!, Levinson released an Urthboy version of "From Little Things Big Things Grow", a song originally released by Kev Carmody and Kelly in 1993. Levinson's version featured elements of the apology to the Stolen Generations, made by Kevin Rudd, Australia's Prime Minister at the time, on 13 February 2008, as well as excerpts of the Redfern Speech, made by former Prime Minister Paul Keating on 10 December 1992.

The song featured Levinson, Carmody and Kelly, Tyrrell and Kennedy, Missy Higgins, Mia Dyson, Radical Son, Dan Sultan, and Joel Wenitong. It peaked at number 4 on the ARIA singles chart, number 2 on both the Australian Chart and the Digital Track Chart, and raised almost A$100,000 for Indigenous health and education programs.

=== 2009–2011: Spitshine ===
In August 2009, Urthboy's released his third solo album, Spitshine. The first single from the album, "Hellsong", was the most downloaded track on Australian radio station Triple J that year. The music video for "Hellsong" was directed by Broken Yellow and consisted of an animation composed of more than 7000 hand-drawn images that were animated in Sydney, Christchurch, London, Hungary and Oslo.

The release of Spitshine was followed by two popular tours in 2009 and 2010, involving crowds of over 20,000 people. Once again, Urthboy was shortlisted for the Australian Music Prize—at the time, he was one of the only artists to ever be nominated twice. In 2010, Urthboy embarked on his first European tour, which included the prominent hip-hop festivals Splash, in Germany, and the Open-Air Festival in Switzerland. The tour also included club shows in Germany with Brother Ali and his first sold-out headline show in London.

Spitshine won the award for Best Independent Hip Hop/Urban Album at the AIR Awards of 2010.

=== 2012–2013: Smokey's Haunt ===
Levinson's fourth album under the Urthboy moniker, released on the Elefant Traks label, was made available to the public on 12 October 2012. Produced by fellow Australian hip-hop colleagues, Count Bounce (TZU) and Hermitude, the album was selected as a "Feature Album" on Triple J. Musical artists Jimblah, Solo and Alex Burnett (Sparkadia) feature as guests on the album: Jimblah and Solo appear on a song entitled "On Your Shoulders" (Jimblah also appears on the song "Glimpses"), and Burnett features on the song "The Big Sleep". Smokey's Haunt achieved a number 14 debut position on the Australian Recording Industry Association (ARIA) Album Chart.

In late February 2013, a national Australian tour in support of the fourth Urthboy album was confirmed, and a live band, featuring drums and keyboard(s)/piano(s), was also announced. Tyrell was also named as a member of the touring group, while the support acts were identified as Jimblah and One Sixth, the latter an artist from Melbourne, Australia.

In 2013 Urthboy was announced as the national support for Paul Kelly's 'Spring & Fall' Tour—the announcement followed multiple previous collaborations, including Urthboy's 2008 cover of "From Little Things Big Things Grow", and a combined cover of the Hunters and Collectors song "Tears of Joy" in early 2013. Then, in early December 2013, Levinson was announced as the support artist for the late December 2013 Australian tour by the Roots.

=== 2014–2022: The Past Beats Inside of Me Like a Second Heartbeat ===
On 22 July 2014, Levinson posted a video clip in which he announces the "Make Me a Mixtape" concept. Based on the mixtape cassette tapes that were popular during the 1980s, Levinson created a live performance in collaboration with other artists based on the themes that would sometimes guide the creation of mixtapes; for example, a mixtape would be given to a friend who was travelling overseas. The first "Make Me a Mixtape" show is based on the theme of Levinson's first overseas trip to Southeast Asia and will consist rap, remix, song and spoken word. Performances are scheduled for both the Brisbane and Melbourne Festivals, with Patience Hodgson (The Grates), Rival MC (Impossible Odds and Black Arm Band) and Bobby Flynn announced as collaborators for the Brisbane show.

The Past Beats Inside of Me Like a Second Heartbeat is Urthboy's 5th studio album, released on 4 March 2016.

=== 2023: Savour ===
In January 2023, Urthboy announced the forthcoming release of his 7th studio album, Savour and final headline tour.

== Political activism ==
=== Australian refugee policy ===
In response to the 2013 Abbott government's refugee policy, titled "Operation Sovereign Borders", whereby asylum seekers arriving by boat are turned back by naval officers and an offshore processing centre—built on Manus Island, Papua New Guinea in 2001—was reopened for offshore processing of asylum seekers, Levinson released a protest song in early March 2014. In the week following the completion of the song, a 23-year-old Iranian national, Reza Berati, was killed at the processing centre. Levinson explained to the media:

I'd been writing a song about the extreme mismatch of our navy facing off against asylum seekers in ramshackle boats. The official silence and militaristic language. The paranoid obsession Australia has with asylum seekers. The billions we spend so we can turn our back. Then Manus Island happened and it clarified the purpose of the song, giving us a tragic consequence to a hopeless situation. Somewhere along the way we mangled our perception of success to be measured by how many boats have landed. This is hysteria. So many miles from the myth of the 'fair go'.

Called "Don't Let It Go", the song was released with an accompanying online music video, directed by Australian filmmaker Dan Ilic, on 6 March 2014. The video uses news footage edited with footage of Levinson rapping with a set of headphones on his head, taking music from the song "Let It Go" by fellow Elefant Traks artist Sietta. Following the release of the material, Levinson stated: "We are talking about quite a popular policy, so a lot of these artists are worried about the bottom line and what their audience are going to think about them. A lot of the time there is this fear of standing up, and I wanted this song to be part of a call to get out there and speak more … We need artists to come out there and break ranks and stop the double speak."

=== Palestine ===
Levinson posted a photograph of himself and daughter marching in a Sydney protest against the Gaza bombings of mid-2014 on 3 August 2014. Levinson wrote: "J**** representing for Palestine in Sydney today".

== Discography ==
=== Studio albums ===
List of studio albums, with selected chart positions
Title	Album details	Peak chart positions
Title	Album details	AUS
Distant Sense of Random Menace	Released: August 2004; Label: Elefant Traks (ACE013); Format: CD	—
The Signal	Released: 14 July 2007; Label: Elefant Traks (ACE032); Format: CD, DD, LP	65
Spitshine	Released: 28 August 2009; Label: Elefant Traks (ACE051); Format: CD, DD, LP	54
Smokey's Haunt	Released: 12 October 2012; Label: Elefant Traks (ACE077); Format: CD, DD, LP	14
The Past Beats Inside Me Like a Second Heartbeat	Released: 4 March 2016; Label: Elefant Traks (ACE138); Format: CD, DD, LP, streaming	7
Jangle Bells	Released: 15 December 2021; Label: Elefant Traks; Format: DD, streaming	—
Savour	Released: 24 February 2023; Label: Elefant Traks; Format: CD, DD, LP, streaming	—
Reckless Bloom	Released: 23 October 2026; Label: Smokey's Great Records, Community; Format: CD, DD, LP, streaming	—

=== Live albums ===
Title	Details
iTunes Live from Sydney	Released: February 2010; Label: Elefant Traks; Format: Digital download
Live at the City Recital Hall Angel Place	Released: 15 November 2013; Label: Elefant Traks (ACE096); Format: CD, digital download

=== Remix albums ===
Title	Details
Smokey's Homies Remix EP	Released: 20 April 2013; Label: Elefant Traks; Format: Digital download

=== Extended plays ===
Title	Details
Turning Circle	Released: 2 March 2018; Label: Elefant Traks (ACE164V); Format: LP, digital download

=== Single ===
List of singles, with year released, selected chart positions, and album shown
Title	Year	Peak chart positions	Album
Title	Year	AUS	Album
"Come Around"	2004	—	Distant Sense of Random Menace
"No Rider"	2004	—	Distant Sense of Random Menace
"We Get Around"	2007	—	The Signal
"From Little Things, Big Things Grow" (Paul Kelly and Kev Carmody cover, as part of The GetUp Mob)	2008	4	Non-album single
"Ready to Go" (with Nat Dunn)	2009	—	Spitshine
"Shruggin'" (featuring Jane Tyrrell)	2009	—	Spitshine
"Naïve Bravado" (featuring Daniel Merriweather)	2012	—	Smokey's Haunt
"Knee Length Socks"	2012	—	Smokey's Haunt
"Someone Else's House" (featuring Josh Pyke)	2014	—	Non-album single
"Long Loud Hours" (featuring Bertie Blackman)	2015	95	The Past Beats Inside Me Like a Second Heartbeat
"Nambucca Boy"	2015	—	Non-album single
"Second Heartbeat" (featuring Sampa the Great & Okenyo)	2016	—	The Past Beats Inside Me Like a Second Heartbeat
"Daughter of the Light" (featuring Kira Puru)	2016	—	The Past Beats Inside Me Like a Second Heartbeat
"The Arrow" (featuring Timberwolf)	2016	—	The Past Beats Inside Me Like a Second Heartbeat
"Roll Up Your Sleeves" (Meg Mac cover – triple j Like a Version)	2018	—	Like a Version
"Fever Dream"	2020	—	Non-album singles
"The Night Took You"	2020	—	Non-album singles
"Sunrise in My Head" (featuring i.amsolo)	2020	—	Non-album singles
"Underline"	2022	—	Savour
"Your City" (featuring Dallas Woods)	2022	—	Savour
"How Far We've Come"	2023	—	Savour
"Father"	2025	—	Reckless Bloom
"FTF"	2026	—	Reckless Bloom
"Other"	2026	—	Reckless Bloom
"Offkey" (featuring Steph Russell)	2026	—	Reckless Bloom

==== As featured artist ====
List of singles as featured artist, showing year released, and album name
Title	Year	Album
"Any Other Name" (Horrorshow with Thelma Plum, Jimblah and Urthboy)	2015	non-album single

=== Guest appearances ===
- "Beastly" by Upshot on Upshot (2003)
- "Alleys to Valleys" by Hermitude on Alleys to Valleys (2003)
- "About to Break" by Upshot on Make It Happen (2004)
- "Outlander" by Chasm on Chasm (2004)
- "Shoot from the Hip" by Unkle Ho on Roads to Roma (2005)
- "Fallen Giants" by Hermitude on Tales of the Drift (2005)
- "The Wash" by Jase on Beat Hedz Volume 1 (2006)
- "Goin on Tour" by Muph & Plutonic on Silence the Sirens (2006)
- "Done the Sums" by Astronomy Class on Exit Strategy (2006)
- "No Matter What Man" by Chasm on Beyond The Beat Tape (2008)
- "Commercial Radio" by The Last Kinection on Nutches (2008)
- "Your Call" by Hermitude on Threads (2008)
- "Dead Em" by Mantra on Speaking Volumes (2011)
- "Doctor's Orders" by Horrorshow on King Amongst Many (2013)

== Awards and nominations ==
=== AIR Awards ===
The Australian Independent Record Awards (commonly known informally as AIR Awards) is an annual awards night to recognise, promote and celebrate the success of Australia's Independent Music sector.

Year	Nominee / work	Award	Result
2007	Urthboy	Most Oustsanding New Independent Artist	Nominated
2007	The Signal	Best Independent Dance/Electronic Album	Nominated
2010	Spitshine	Best Independent Hip Hop/Urban Album	Won
2013	Smokey's Haunt	Best Independent Hip Hop/Urban Album	Nominated
2024	Savour	Best Independent Hip Hop Album or EP	Nominated

=== ARIA Music Awards ===
Year	Nominee / work	Award	Result
2010	Spitshine	Best Urban Album	Nominated
2013	Smokey's Haunt	Best Urban Album	Nominated
2016	The Past Beats Inside Me Like A Second Heartbeat	Best Urban Album	Nominated

=== Australian Music Prize ===
The Australian Music Prize (the AMP) is an annual award of $30,000 given to an Australian band or solo artist in recognition of the merit of an album released during the year of award. The commenced in 2005.

Year	Nominee / work	Award	Result
2007	The Signal	Australian Music Prize	Nominated
2009	Spitshine	Australian Music Prize	Nominated
2012	Smokey's Haunt	Australian Music Prize	Nominated

=== J Award ===
The J Awards are an annual series of Australian music awards that were established by the Australian Broadcasting Corporation's youth-focused radio station Triple J. They commenced in 2005.

Year	Nominee / work	Award	Result
2007	The Signal	Australian Album of the Year	Nominated
