= Horrorshow (band) =

Australian hip-hop duo

- Origin: Australia
- Genre: Hip-hop
- Years active: 2006–present
- Label: Elefant Traks
- Members: Nick Bryant-Smith (MC Solo)
- Past members: Adit Gauchan (Adit)

Horrorshow is an Australian hip-hop music duo from the Inner West region of Sydney that consists of producer Adit and rapper MC Solo. Horrorshow, together with Spit Syndicate, Jackie Onassis and Joyride, are members of One Day collective. Horrorshow is recognised as an influential act in the subgenre of Australian hip-hop. Horrorshow has appeared at major Australian music festivals, including the Big Day Out, Splendour in the Grass and Groovin' the Moo.

== History ==
=== 2006–2011:The Grey Space and Inside Story ===
After signing with the Elefant Traks label, the pair released their debut album The Grey Space, an album created largely during the duo's high school years, at a time where they linked up with Spit Syndicate and Joyride to form the extended One Day crew. Elefant Traks artist and co-founder Urthboy explained the duo's recruitment in a blog post published in the lead-up to the release of Horrorshow's third album:

When Horrorshow brought me The Grey Space I deduced that they were fans of Atmosphere. They wouldn't put "Walk You Home" on it, making the better decision to keep it for their unfinished second album, despite my wishes at the time. The first " we wanna join the Elefants " conversation I had with them took place on the balcony at our studio/office at the time in Enmore. I remember telling them that the only way Elefant Traks could develop was if the likes of Horrorshow took the possibilities opened up by The Herd and amplify them.

The Grey Space was nominated for an award at the ARIA Music Awards of 2009. The band completed tours with The Herd, Muph & Plutonic and Hermitude.

After the release of their debut followed their second album Inside Story in 2009, which was acclaimed amongst their fans for its eloquent lyricism and soulful production. It was chosen as a Triple J Feature Album, FBi Album of the Week and was also favourably received by Australian music critics.

=== 2012–2015: King Amongst Many ===
In 2012, Horrorshow again supported the Hilltop Hoods on a European tour and continued in this role for the Hilltop Hoods' "Speaking in Tongues" Australian tour. The band was included in the line-up for the 2012 Brisbane Festival and performed at the Spiegeltent venue.

An indication of Horrorshow's third album was revealed with a song entitled "Did You Hear?", which features a horns section. On 22 December 2012, a confirmation of the third album's 2013 release was posted on the group's Facebook fan page. In early May 2013, another song "Unfair Lottery" was released on the Internet and received radio airplay. The song was made officially available in a digital format on 24 May 2013 and appears on Horrorshow's third album. The subject of "Unfair Lottery" is concerned with the racial notion of "white privilege". The music video for "Unfair Lottery" premiered on Channel V's "WTF" programme on 5 June 2013.

The band revealed the name of their third album King Amongst Many on 13 June 2013, following the rapid sale of tickets for the "Unfair Lottery" single launch shows. An album release date of 2 August 2013 was subsequently publicised in the promotional material for the Australian 'King Amongst Many Tour' that spans from September to November 2013.

King Amongst Many was featured as 'Album of the Week' on Australia's Triple J radio station and feature album on Sydney, Australia community radio station FBi.

=== 2016–2020: Bardo State ===
The first indication of a fourth album from the duo came in August 2016, with the release of a new single, 'If You Know What I Mean', accompanied by a video clip and tour announcement. This was followed by the melancholy yet uplifting track 'Push', which featured vocals from 16-year-old Taj Ralph. On 30 January 2017, Horrorshow announced that their fourth full-length release, Bardo State, would be released on 24 February. The album title "references The Tibetan Book of the Dead (or Bardo Thodol) and the duo wove concepts of the text into the album making process."

=== 2020-2022: I Won't Give You Up & Good Problems ===
On 15 April 2022, Horrorshow announced the released of their forthcoming EP Good Problems.

== Discography ==
=== Studio albums ===
List of studio albums, with selected chart positions and certifications
Title	Album details	Peak chart positions
Title	Album details	AUS
The Grey Space	Released: 16 August 2008; Label: Elefant Traks (ACE041); Formats: CD, Digital, LP	-
Inside Story	Released: 2 October 2009; Label: Elefant Traks (ACE052); Formats: CD, Digital, LP	-
King Amongst Many	Released: 2 August 2013; Label: Elefant Traks (ACE089); Formats: CD, LP, Digital	2
Bardo State	Released: 24 February 2017; Label: Elefant Traks (ACE159); Formats: CD, LP, Digital	4
New Normal	Released: 18 October 2019; Label: Elefant Traks (ACE210); Formats: CD, LP, Digital	9

=== Live albums ===
List of live albums
Title	Details
Live At The Spiegeltent	Released: 25 March 2013; Label: Elefant Traks; Format: CD, Digital
Live from the Listen Close Tour	Released: 2 October 2015; Label: Elefant Traks (ACE125); Format: CD, Digital; Limited to 1000 numbered copies.
Live with the Metropolitan Orchestra	Released: 3 July 2020; Label: Elefant Traks; Format: CD, Digital

=== Extended plays ===
List of Extended Plays
Title	Details
I Won't Give You Up (with Ziggy Alberts)	Released: 21 August 2020; Label: Commonfolk Records; Format: Digital
Good Times	Released: 13 May 2022; Label: Elefant Traks; Format: Digital
Bad Feelings	Released: 21 October 2022; Label: Elefant Traks; Format: Digital

=== Singles ===
List of singles, showing year
Title	Year	Album
"Did You Hear?	2011	
"Unfair Lottery"	2013	King Amongst Many
"Nice Guys Finish Last" (featuring Joyride)	2014	King Amongst Many
"Any Other Name" (with Thelma Plum, Jimblah & Urthboy)	2015	non album single
"If You Know What I Mean"	2016	Bardo State
"Right Here" (featuring B Wise & Omar Musa)	2016	non album single
"Eat the Cake"	2017	Bardo State
"No Aphrodisiac" (Live on Triple J Like a Version)	2017	Like a Version
"Rescue"	2019	New Normal
"The Same" (featuring I.E.)	2019	New Normal
"Eyes Closed"	2019	New Normal
"Grain By Grain"	2019	New Normal
"88 Bars (Behind the Scenes)"	2020	TBA
"Heaven Part 2" (with Ziggy Alberts)	2020	I Won't Give You Up
"DMT"	2022	GoodProblems
"Yours & Mine"	2022	GoodProblems
"Melancholic" (featuring Atmosphere)	2022	Bad Feelings
"Have a Nice Day" (featuring Bootleg Rascal)	2022	Bad Feelings
"Hideaway" (featuring Mason Dane)	2022	Bad Feelings

=== Other certified songs ===
List of certified songs, showing year, certification and album
Title	Year	Certification	Album
"Cherry Blossoms"	2017	Australian Recording Industry Association: Gold	Bardo State

== Awards and nominations ==
=== AIR Awards ===
The Australian Independent Record Awards (commonly known informally as AIR Awards) is an annual awards night to recognise, promote and celebrate the success of Australia's Independent Music sector.

Year	Nominee / work	Award	Result	Ref.
2010	Inside Story	Best Independent Hip Hop/Urban Album	Nominated	
2014	King Amongst Many	Best Independent Hip Hop/Urban Album	Nominated	
2018	Bardo State	Best Independent Hip Hop/Urban Album	Nominated	
2020	New Normal	Best Independent Hip Hop/Urban Album	Nominated	
2021	New Normal (Deluxe)	Best Independent Hip Hop Album or EP	Nominated	

=== ARIA Music Awards ===
The ARIA Music Awards is an annual awards ceremony that recognises excellence, innovation, and achievement across all genres of Australian music.

Year	Nominee / work	Award	Result	Ref.
2009	The Grey Space	Best Urban Album	Nominated	
2013	King Amongst Many	Best Urban Album	Nominated	

=== Australian Music Prize ===
The Australian Music Prize (the AMP) is an annual award of $30,000 given to an Australian band or solo artist in recognition of the merit of an album released during the year of award. The commenced in 2005.

Year	Nominee / work	Award	Result	Ref.
2013	King Amongst Many	Australian Music Prize	Nominated	

=== J Award ===
The J Awards are an annual series of Australian music awards that were established by the Australian Broadcasting Corporation's youth-focused radio station Triple J. They commenced in 2005.

Year	Nominee / work	Award	Result	Ref.
2013	King Amongst Many	Australian Album of the Year	Nominated	
