= Exit Strategy (album) =

Studio album by Astronomy Class
- Released: 30 September 2006
- Recorded: Tardis Studios
- Genre: Australian hip hop
- Label: Elefant Traks

Exit Strategy is the debut album from Astronomy Class and was released on 30 September 2006. It also features collaborations with several prominent Australian MCs and musicians.

== Track listing ==
All tracks written by Shannon Kennedy, Shane Roberts, Chris Hamer-Smith and Maddox unless otherwise noted.

1. "Midnight at the Observatory" - 3:18
2. "Rolling Thunder" - 4:06
3. "Vibe Won't Stop" (Kennedy, Roberts, Hamer-Smith, Maddox, Burre) - 3:37
4. "Rewind the Tape" (Kennedy, Roberts, Hamer-Smith, Maddox, Harrison) - 4:07
5. "Nuthin' Nice" (Kennedy, Roberts, Hamer-Smith, Maddox, Williams) - 3:30
6. "Heatseeker" (Kennedy, Roberts, Hamer-Smith, Maddox, Bennett) - 4:04
7. "After the Carnival" - 3:55
8. "Brink of War Part III" (Kennedy, Roberts, Hamer-Smith, Maddox, Messinger) - 3:50
9. "Fight Club" - 3:33
10. "Done the Sums" (Kennedy, Roberts, Hamer-Smith, Maddox, Levin) - 4:12
11. "A Bright Tomorrow" (Kennedy, Roberts, Hamer-Smith, Maddox, Crowf) - 4:11
12. "No Drop to Drink" (Kennedy, Roberts, Hamer-Smith, Maddox, Tyrrell) - 3:46
13. "School Daze" (Kennedy, Roberts, Hamer-Smith, Maddox, Mitchell) - 4:10
14. "Exit Strategy" (Kennedy, Roberts, Hamer-Smith, Maddox, Tyrrell) - 4:24
15. "Ignition Dub" (Kennedy, Roberts, Hamer-Smith, Maddox, Burnham) - 3:41
16. "Heatseeking Dub" (Kennedy, Roberts, Hamer-Smith, Maddox, Burnham) - 4:01
17. "Lovers Dub" (Kennedy, Roberts, Hamer-Smith, Maddox, Burnham) - 3:47

== Guest artists ==
Guest artists on the album include:

- Gina Mitchell (Fbi's Basslines) on "Vibe Won't Stop"
- Lotek (Big Dada) on "Rewind The Tape" and "Heatseeker"
- BVA (Mnemonic Ascent) on "Rewind The Tape"
- Ben Ezra (ESL) and DJ Skoob (NSW DMC Champ) on "Brink of War Part III"
- Hau (Koolism) and Urthboy on "Done the Sums"
- Jane Tyrrell from The Herd on "No Drop To Drink" and "Exit Strategy"

== Reviews ==
Professional ratings
Review scores
Source	Rating
Pop Matters	5/10 stars

- 'In The Mix' album review - Exit Strategy
- Mediasearch Astronomy Class - Exit Strategy (album review)
