= Okenyo =

Zindzi Okenyo
- Also known as: Okenyo
- Born: 1985 or 1986 (age 40–41); Sydney, New South Wales, Australia
- Genres: R&B, hip hop, soul
- Occupations: Musician, actress
- Label: Elefant Traks
- Website: www.okenyo.com

Zindzi Okenyo (born 1985 or 1986) is an Australian television and theatre actress and musician from Sydney. A graduate of the National Institute of Dramatic Art (NIDA), she is a presenter on Play School, and performs music professionally under the stage name Okenyo. She is best known for the song "Woman's World", from her debut EP album, The Wave.

== Career ==
=== Music ===
In 2013, Okenyo signed to the promotional label Niche Productions, and in 2016 to indie record Label Elefant Traks. Her debut single, "Broken Chest", was released in November 2013. "Woman's World" was nominated for Best Song on FBi Radio in 2017. The song was chosen for the Women's National Basketball League 2017 Campaign, and was also used in a US Apple Instagram Promotion. Authors at the Noisey site, operated by Vice (magazine), said of the song: "There is a self-awareness and empowerment in the lyrics and a defiant resolve in the message as she identifies misrepresentation in gender and sexual stereotypes" with comparisons to artists like Erykah Badu and Janelle Monae. Okenyo and her song featured in the documentary Her Sound, Her Story" about the "inequality of women in the Australian Music Industry".

"Woman's World 2.0" is a remix of "Woman's World" featuring Miss Blanks and Jesswar. The song was featured in VicHealth's "This Girl Can - Victoria" television ad campaign.

Okenyo has performed gigs with Santigold and Billie Eilish, played at Splendour In the Grass and VIVID Sydney, and recently played her first run of headline shows.

=== Television ===
Okenyo's television credits include Play School, off-screen Narrator of Hoopla Doopla! (2014), the role of Amanda in the Australian television series Sisters, journalist Millie Hussey in the television drama series The Code, and Sophie in the series Janet King.

In 2018, reflecting on her success as an actor and musician, she said, "It's really exciting because my identity and my artistry are starting to work together... I always imagined that happening because it's really important to me to explain myself and express myself in different ways."

In 2024, Okenyo played the role of Pip Sweeney in Troppo (2022-), which was based on Candice Fox's best-selling Crimson Lake novels. Okenyo would also appear in Stan original series Critical Incident.

== Theatre ==
Okenyo has performed in the following theatre productions:

- An Ideal Husband, Melbourne Theatre Company
- Antony and Cleopatra, Sydney Opera House
- La traviata, Belvoir St Theatre
- Gaybies, Eternity Playhouse

== Filmography ==
Year	Title	Role	Notes	Ref
2024	Critical Incident	Inspector Ivy Tsuma	TV series: 6 episodes	
2024	Troppo	Sweeney	TV series: 8 episodes	
2023	Wolf Like Me	Alex	TV series: 2 episodes	
2023	Deadloch	Kate	TV series: 2 episodes	
2023	Totally Completely Fine	Caitlin	TV series 2 episodes	
2022	Fisk	Patch	TV series 1 episode	
2021	Wakefield	Tamara	TV series 1 episode	
2019	Get Krack!n	Nekisa	TV series 1 episode	
2018	Harrow	Sally	TV series 1 episode	
2017	Sisters	Amanda	TV series: 7 episodes	
2017	Janet King	Sophie	TV series: 1 episode	
2015	Hiding	Jacq	TV series 3 episodes	
2014	The Code	Millie	TV series 4 episodes	
2014	Wonderland	Maxy Slipper	TV series 1 episode	
2014	Plonk	Hip blogger	TV series 1 episode	

=== Film appearances ===
Year	Title	Role	Notes
2020	The Very Excellent Mr. Dundee	ACN Anchor	
2019	This Time, Maybe	Zoe	
2019	Lilttle Monsters	Security Guard #1	
2017	The Casting Game	Bonnie	
2009	What if Girl	Officer Worker	Short
