= Astronomy Class =

Australian musical group

- Origin: Sydney, New South Wales, Australia
- Genres: Hip hop, reggae
- Years active: 2006–present
- Label: Elefant Traks
- Members: Shannon Kennedy (aka Ozi Batla); Shane Roberts (aka Sir Robbo); Chris Hamer-Smith (aka Chasm)
- Website: Official webpage

Astronomy Class are an Australian hip-hop / reggae group from Sydney. The group comprises Ozi Batla (Shannon Kennedy), Sir Robbo (Shane Roberts) and Chasm (Chris Hamer-Smith).

Kennedy is a member of The Herd, while Roberts is a member of Frigid and prog, downtempo and Krautrock band Tooth.

== Biography ==
The group formed when Kennedy decided to collaborate with producers Roberts and Hamer-Smith in 2006.

"The original concept for Chasm and I was to do a production album, with various MCs and singers," Roberts says. "We'd both worked separately with Batla in the past, he was our main MC, so we gave him the beats [first]. He was really taken with them and expressed a desire to have them all for himself. That was how it started."

The resulting album, Exit Strategy was released in September 2006 and was selected by Triple J as its first feature album for 2007. The album features guests such as Lotek, Hau from Koolism, Urthboy, Ben Ezra (ESL), Gina Mitchell (Fbi's Basslines), DJ Skoob (NSW DMC Champ), 2Buck, Murda1, Lotek and BVA (Mnemonic Ascent), as well as Jane Tyrell (The Herd). Tracks from the album such as "A Bright Tomorrow", "Done The Sums" and "Rewind The Tape" all receiving airplay on Triple J and community radio stations across Australia. On the back of the album release Astronomy Class undertook a national tour covering five states and seventeen destinations over three months.

When asked how the name of the band came about, Kennedy advised (in an interview with Scene Magazine):

"A theme started to emerge that kind of had an astral flavour. There's a bit of a history in hip hop and also reggae of doing astral/space themes. As I kept writing, there was sort of a narrative coming out about that same theme going on – it just started to stick after a while."

This notion was confirmed in a 2009 interview with Music Feeds where Ozi Batla discusses his love of sci-fi and related subject matter.

It just came about because of a few of the first tracks that I wrote. Midnight at the Observatory and also Brink of War and Exist Strategy. There is a sci-fi theme there and I am a pretty big sci-fi fan. We kept on the sci-fi theme with War of the Worlds and a few other tracks that are on this album as well. There is a hiphop and reggae tradition as well of that kind of outer space theme. We just were drawing on that as inspiration.

— Ozi Batla

Astronomy Class were the sole support artists for Lily Allen's Brisbane and Sydney tour dates in 2007.

Marking the International Year of Astronomy, Astronomy Class released their second album, Pursuit of Happiness, on 2 May 2009. The album features guest vocals by Vida-Sunshyne, The Tongue, Diafrix, Kween G (KillaQueenz), and Ash Grunwald. The group toured nationally in support of the release between May and June 2009.

== Discography ==
=== Albums ===
List of albums, with release date and label shown
Title	Details
Exit Strategy	Released: 9 September 2006; Label: Elefant Traks (ACE027/ACE028); Formats: CD, 2xLP, Digital download,
Pursuit of Happiness	Released: 2 May 2009; Label: Elefant Traks (ACE 046); Formats: CD, Digital download
Mekong Delta Sunrise	Released: 25 April 2014; Label: Elefant Traks (ACE098-ACE0107); Formats: CD, LP, Cassette, Digital download

== Awards and nominations ==
=== ARIA Music Awards ===
The ARIA Music Awards is an annual awards ceremony that recognises excellence, innovation, and achievement across all genres of Australian music. They commenced in 1987.

Year	Nominee / work	Award	Result	Ref.
2014	Mekong Delta Sunrise	Best World Music Album	Nominated	
