= B Wise =

Nigerian Australian rapper

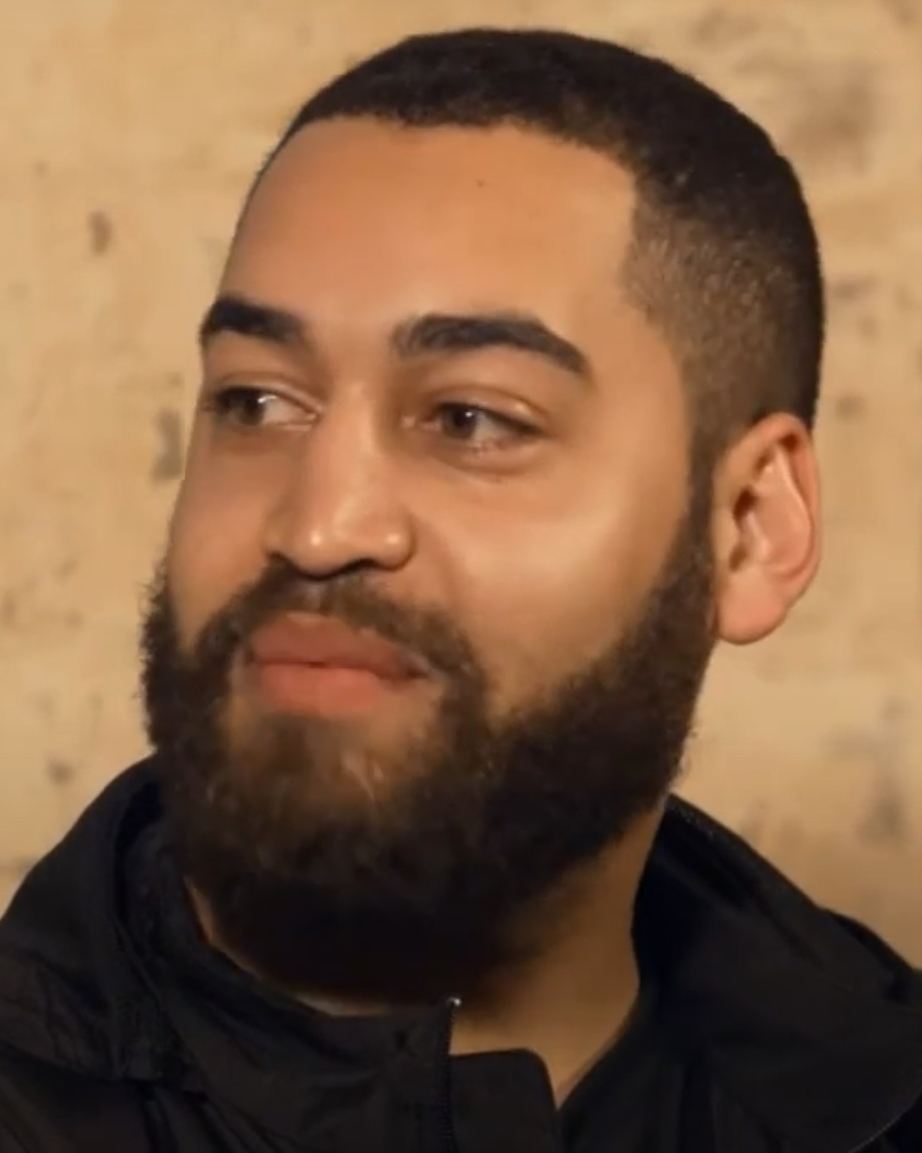
- B Wise in 2015

Background information
- Born: James Iheakanwa; Liverpool, New South Wales, Australia
- Origin: Sydney, New South Wales, Australia
- Genre: Hip hop
- Occupations: Rapper; singer; songwriter; record producer
- Instruments: Vocals; production
- Years active: 2013–present
- Labels: Elefant Traks; Semi Pro Sound (independent)
- Website: ugottabwise.com

James Iheakanwa, known professionally as B Wise, is a Nigerian Australian rapper from Sydney, New South Wales.

He released his debut album Area Famous in 2018 via the label Elefant Tracks.

== Biography ==
Iheakanwa was born and raised in Liverpool, New South Wales, the son of a Nigerian social worker and entrepreneur father and an Australian nurse and maternal support worker mother. The eldest of three children, Iheakanwa spent six months in Nigeria with his father when he was 12 years old, where he discovered hip-hop influences such as Tupac Shakur, but he was shaped by life in the southwest suburbs.

In July 2022, B Wise formed the group BBGB with BLESSED, Manu Crooks, Kwame and Lil Spacely. BBGB released their debut single "Tough Love" on 15 July 2022.

== Advocacy ==
Alongside musicians Jack River and Ebony Boadu, Iheakanwa was a keynote speaker at the 2019 Conference for Young People in Sydney, in which he shared his experiences of how he got his start in the industry.

== Discography ==
=== Studio albums ===
List of studio albums, with release date and label shown
Title	Album details
Area Famous	Released: 14 September 2018; Label: Elefant Traks; Formats: CD, Digital download, streaming
Jamie	Released: 20 August 2021; Label: Semi Pro Sound (independent); Formats: Digital download, streaming
Resilient Ones	Released: 31 July 2026; Label: B Wise; Formats: Digital download, streaming

=== Extended plays ===
List of EPs, with release date and label shown
Title	EP details
Semi Pro	Released: 23 September 2016; Label: Elefant Traks; Formats: Digital download, streaming

=== Charted singles ===
==== Singles as lead artist ====
List of charted singles, with year released, selected chart positions, and album name shown
Title	Year	Peak chart positions		Album
Title	Year	AUS	NZ	Album
"Won't Stop" (with Onefour)	2020	—	— (Note: "Won't Stop" did not enter the Official New Zealand Music Chart, but did peak at number thirty on the NZ Hot Singles Chart.)	jamie

==== As featured artist ====
List of singles, with year released, selected chart positions, and album name shown
Title	Year	Peak chart positions	Album
Title	Year	NZ	Album
"Wonders" (Swidt featuring Mikey Dam and B Wise)	2020	— (Note: "Wonders" did not enter the Official New Zealand Music Chart, but did peak at number thirty-four on the NZ Hot Singles Chart.)	

== Awards and nominations ==
=== AIR Awards ===
The Australian Independent Record Awards (commonly known informally as AIR Awards) is an annual awards night to recognise, promote and celebrate the success of Australia's independent music sector.

Year	Nominee / work	Award	Result	Ref.
2019	Area Famous	Best Independent Hip Hop/Urban Album	Won	

=== APRA Awards ===
The APRA Awards are presented annually from 1982 by the Australasian Performing Right Association (APRA), "honouring composers and songwriters". They commenced in 1982.

Year	Nominee / work	Award	Result	Ref.
2022	"Ezinna" by B Wise, Sampa The Great & Milan Ring (Nicholas Martin, Milan Ring, Sampa Tembo, Tung Yeng, James Iheakanwa)	Song of the Year	Shortlisted	

=== ARIA Music Awards ===
The ARIA Music Awards is an annual ceremony presented by Australian Recording Industry Association (ARIA), which recognise excellence, innovation, and achievement across all genres of the music of Australia. They commenced in 1987.

Year	Nominee / work	Award	Result	Ref.
2021	jamie	Best Hip Hop Release	Nominated	
