= Hermitude =

Australian hip-hop and electronic music duo

- Origin: Blue Mountains, New South Wales, Australia
- Genres: Electronic; Australian hip-hop; post-dubstep; wonky; trap
- Years active: 2000–present
- Labels: Heavy Weather, Elefant Traks
- Members: Angus Stuart (also known as El Gusto); Luke Dubber (also known as Luke Dubs)
- Website: www.hermitude.com

Hermitude are an Australian hip-hop and electronic music duo, originating from the Blue Mountains, New South Wales.

== Biography ==
=== Early years ===
Multi-instrumentalists, Luke Dubber (a.k.a. Luke Dubs) and Angus Stuart (a.k.a. Elgusto), have collaborated in bands since 1994, when they were aged 16 and 11, respectively. Their first functional band was called "Funk Injection" and included Stuart's sister, Aja Stuart, on bass.

=== 2000–2009: Career beginnings of Hermitude ===
After Stuart returned from a trip to the US in 2000 with a set of turntables, the two tried jamming together with Dubs playing keyboard, sans vocals. The combination worked so well that they realised they didn't need anything else, and Hermitude was formed.

Signing with the Elefant Traks label, founded by The Herd, Hermitude released the vinyl-only Imaginary Friends EP in 2002. The collection of esoteric instrumental soundscapes, with two vocal cuts provided by Urthboy and Ozi Batla, sold out and has never been transferred to CD, making it a collector's item. In 2003, the band released their first album, Alleys to Valleys. The name referred to their moving between Sydney and a recording studio called Sound Heaven in the Blue Mountains, owned by Stuart's father, John Stuart, which allowed them to live like hermit crabs half the time. The other half of their time they spent coming down from the mountains to try out their new material in the clubs of the city.

The popularity of Hermitude's debut allowed them to earn support billing with touring international acts such as, Dizzee Rascal, RJD2, and DJ Krush, and then record Tales of the Drift in 2005. A more percussive, Cuban sound was created, inspired by Stuart's time spent there in his youth. In 2006 Hermitude embarked overseas to pursue bigger success, landing gigs in Europe, Asia and the US. They were invited to perform in Malaysia, Norway and Spain as well as at DJ Kentaro's Japanese album launch, and were booked for Aceyalone and Abstract Rude's West Coast US tour. While on this world tour, Dubber and Stuart wrote the tunes that would make up their 2007 EP, Rare Sightings. Released in November 2007, initially sold at venues on their return tour of Australia, it was their fourth release on Elefant Traks. Hermitude then joined Urthboy and The Tongue on a national tour throughout Australia. Copies of the CD sold out during the tour and had to go back to press before copies could be released in stores.

=== 2010–2017: HyperParadise and Dark Night Sweet Light ===
In 2010 Hermitude released the single, "Get in My Life" and in 2011 "Speak of the Devil", from the album HyperParadise, which was released on 3 February 2012. The title track of the album peaked at number 38 on the ARIA Singles Chart in February 2013. "Speak of the Devil" won the 2011 J Award for Music Video of the Year.

In 2014 they released the single "Ukiyo" without radio or video servicing, yet in a few months it had millions of plays. In October of that year Hermitude toured North America for the first time, supporting Rüfüs Du Sol.

In January 2015 "Through the Roof", the first official single from the new album Dark Night Sweet Light. The album was released in May 2015 and peaked at number 1 on the ARIA Charts. The album spawned four other singles, including multi-platinum selling "The Buzz" which peaked at number 20, becoming Hermitude's highest-charting song. Dark Night Sweet Light has gone Gold in multiple countries.

=== 2018–2020: Pollyanarchy ===
In November 2018 Hermitude released "Stupid World". Hermitude said the song was written in response to the craziness happening globally, whether it be politically or societally, saying "However you wanna deal with what's happening around us in the world right now, you can do it your own way through music."

In September 2019 Hermitude released their sixth studio album, Pollyanarchy, featuring Buddy and BJ The Chicago Kid, Vic Mensa and more which peaked at number 18 on the ARIA Charts.

=== 2021–present: Mirror Mountain, post-Elefant Traks and Eight ===
In February 2022, the band announced the release of Mirror Mountain and released the single "Promises" featuring Andie.

== Other projects ==
Apart from Hermitude, Stuart has spent the last couple of years playing and touring with Paul Mac as percussionist and DJ, while Dubber has lent his keyboard skills to many local Sydney outfits including Gauche, The Tango Saloon and The Bird, as well as touring with Tom Tom Crew the internationally acclaimed Hip-Hop Circus stage production.

== Discography ==
=== Studio albums ===
List of studio albums, with selected chart positions
Title	Album details	Peak chart positions		Certifications
Title	Album details	AUS	NZ	Certifications
Alleys to Valleys	Released: August 2003; Label: Elefant Traks (ACE010); Formats: CD	—	—	
Tales of the Drift	Released: August 2005; Label: Elefant Traks (ACE019/ACE020); Formats: CD, 2×LP	—	—	
Threads	Released: September 2008; Label: Elefant Traks (ACE043/ACE044); Formats: CD, 2×LP, digital	—	—	
HyperParadise	Released: February 2012; Label: Elefant Traks (ACE069/ACE071); Formats: CD, 2×LP, digital	37	—	
Dark Night Sweet Light	Released: May 2015; Label: Elefant Traks (ACE118/ACE121); Formats: CD, 2×LP, digital	1	27	ARIA: Gold
Pollyanarchy	Released: September 2019; Label: Elefant Traks (ACE206); Formats: CD, LP, digital	18	—	
Mirror Mountain	Released: 6 May 2022; Label: Elefant Traks (ACE265); Formats: CD, LP, digital	66	—	
Eight	Released: 17 April 2026; Label: Heavy Weather (HW008V); Formats: LP, digital	39	—	

=== Extended plays ===
List of extended plays, with selected details shown, such as title, release date, and certifications
Title	Details	Certifications
Imaginary Friends	Released: 2002; Label: Elefant Traks (ACE008EP); Format: LP	
Rare Sightings	Released: December 2007; Label: Elefant Traks (ACE036/ACE037); Format: CD, LP, digital download	
Parallel Paradise	Released: 8 June 2012; Label: Elefant Traks (ACE079); Format: digital download, LP (limited run of 400 copies)	ARIA: Platinum
VIP Flips	Released: January 2024; Label: Elefant Traks; Format: digital download	

=== Charted/certified singles ===
List of charted or certified singles as lead artist, with selected chart positions
Title	Year	Peak chart positions		Certifications	Album
Title	Year	AUS	NZ Hot	Certifications	Album
"HyperParadise" (solo or Flume remix)	2012	38	—		HyperParadise
"The Buzz" (featuring Mataya & Young Tapz)	2015	20	—	ARIA: Platinum; MC: Gold	Dark Night Sweet Light
"Searchlight" (featuring Yeo)	2015	66	—		Dark Night Sweet Light
"Stupid World" (featuring Bibi Bourelly)	2018	—	—	ARIA: Gold	Pollyanarchy
"Phew" (featuring Bibi Bourelly)	2019	—	38		Pollyanarchy
"St Claire"	2021	—	26		Mirror Mountain
"Promises"	2022	—	39		Mirror Mountain

== Awards and nominations ==
=== AIR Awards ===
The Australian Independent Record Awards (commonly known informally as AIR Awards) is an annual awards night to recognise, promote and celebrate the success of Australia's Independent Music sector.

Year	Nominee / work	Award	Result	Ref.
2009	Threads	Best Independent Hip Hop/Urban Album	Nominated	
2012	HyperParadise	Best Independent Dance/Electronica album	Won	
2015	themselves	Best Independent Artist	Nominated	
2015	Dark Night Sweet Light	Best Independent Album	Nominated	
2015	Dark Night Sweet Light	Best Independent Dance/Electronic Album	Nominated	
2015	Hermitude featuring Mataya & Young Tapz – "The Buzz"	Best Independent Single or EP	Nominated	
2019	"Stupid World" (featuring Bibi Bourelly)	Best Independent Single or EP	Nominated	
2020	Pollyanarchy	Best Independent Dance or Electronica Album or EP	Nominated	

=== APRA Awards ===
The APRA Awards are held in Australia and New Zealand by the Australasian Performing Right Association to recognise songwriting skills, sales and airplay performance by its members annually.

Year	Nominee / work	Award	Result	Ref.
2016	"The Buzz"	Urban Work of the Year	Nominated	

=== Australia Music Prize ===
The Australian Music Prize (the AMP) is an annual award of $30,000 given to an Australian band or solo artist in recognition of the merit of an album released during the year of award.

Year	Nominee / work	Award	Result	Ref.
2012	HyperParadise	Australian Album of the Year	Won	

=== ARIA Music Awards ===
The ARIA Music Awards is an annual awards ceremony that recognises excellence, innovation, and achievement across all genres of Australian music.

Year	Nominee / work	Award	Result	Ref.
2012	HyperParadise	Best Dance Release	Nominated	
2012	"Speak of the Devil" (directed by Emma Tomelty)	Best Video	Nominated	
2015	Dark Night Sweet Light	Album of the Year	Nominated	
2015	Dark Night Sweet Light	Best Group	Nominated	
2015	Dark Night Sweet Light	Best Independent Release	Nominated	
2015	Mitch Kenny for Dark Night Sweet Light	Engineer of the Year	Nominated	
2015	Luke Dubber and Angus Stuart for Dark Night Sweet Light	Producer of the Year	Nominated	
2015	Through the Roof" (directed by Kess Broekman-Dattner)	Best Video	Nominated	
2015	Dark Night Sweet Light Tour	Best Australian Live Act	Nominated	

=== J Awards ===
The J Awards are an annual series of Australian music awards that were established by the Australian Broadcasting Corporation's youth-focused radio station Triple J. They commenced in 2005.

Year	Nominee / work	Award	Result	Ref.
2011	"Speak of the Devil" (directed by Emma Tomelty)	Australian Video of the Year	Won	
2015	Dark Night Sweet Light	Australian Album of the Year	Nominated	

=== National Live Music Awards ===
The National Live Music Awards (NLMAs) are a broad recognition of Australia's diverse live industry, celebrating the success of the Australian live scene. The awards commenced in 2016.

Year	Nominee / work	Award	Result	Ref.
2019	Hermitude	Live Electronic Act (or DJ) of the Year	Nominated	
