= Elefant Traks =

Defunct Australian hip-hop record label

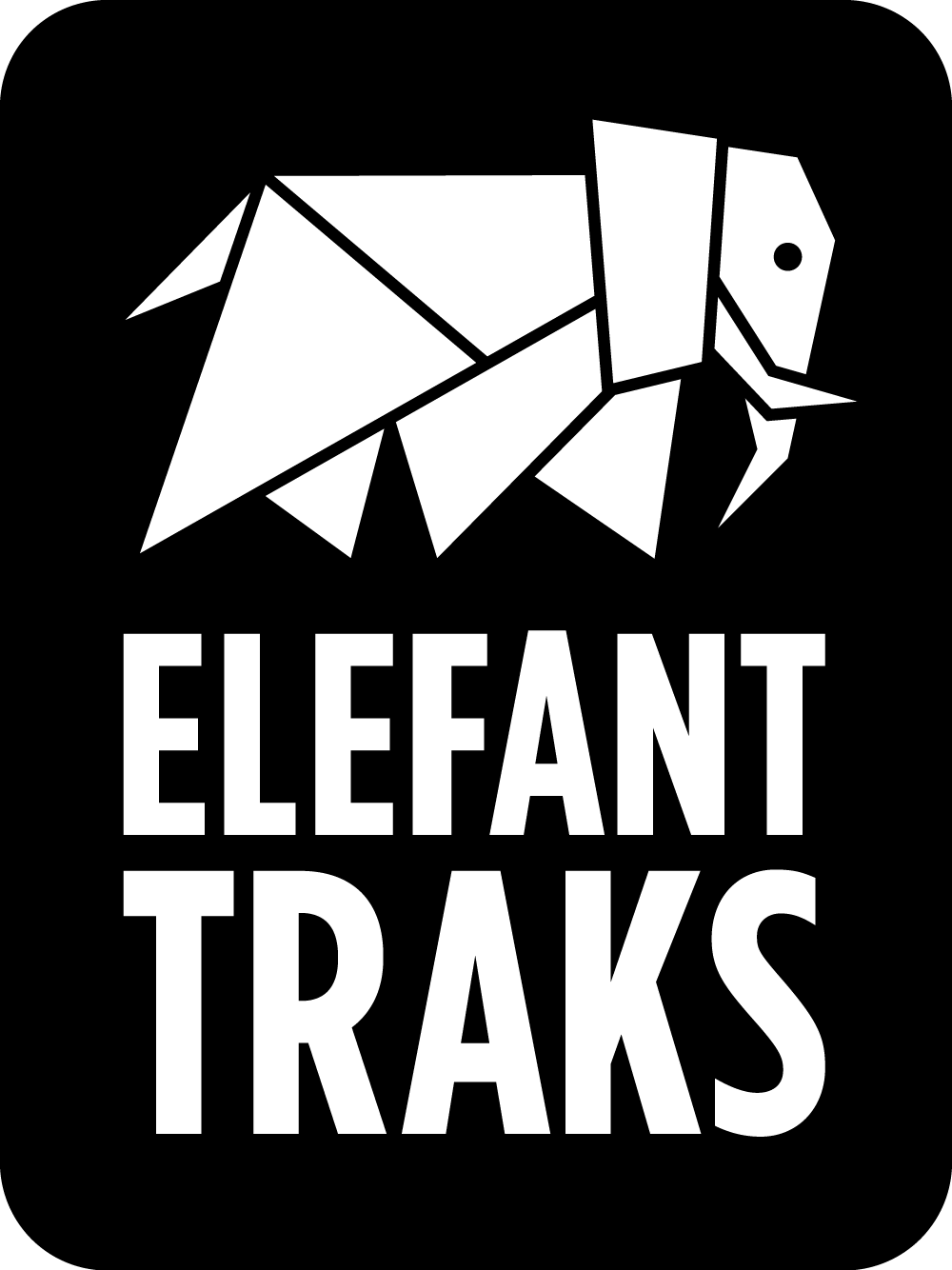
- Founded: 1998
- Founder: Kenny Sabir (Traksewt)
- Defunct: 2024
- Status: Defunct
- Genre: Hip-hop, electronic, jazz, soul, blues
- Country of origin: Australia
- Location: Sydney
- Official website: http://www.elefanttraks.com/

Elefant Traks was a record label based in Sydney, founded by Kenny Sabir (p.k.a.Traksewt) in 1998. The label predominantly released Australian hip-hop music, and founded its own hip-hop collective, The Herd, as well as managing acts like Horrorshow and Hermitude. The label was distributed in Australia by Inertia Distribution.

== History ==
=== 1998–2007: Formation, The Herd, Urthboy, Horrorshow ===
Elefant Traks started in 1998 by Kenny Sabir (Traksewt). Under Sabir's management, the label released their first compilation album, Cursive Writing, which was created for "a close friend moving overseas". Sabir explained the process in 2011: "For the first compilation, some of the people on there I had never actually even met at the time of release. It was sliding a CD under the door type of stuff. I think that was Richie (Tamplenizza), I didn't meet him."

Sabir enlisted the help of Tim Levinson (Urthboy) to run the administration arm of the label, as the nature of the work was not compatible with his aspirations.

Sabir, Tamplenizza and Levinson became founding members of the Australian hip-hop group The Herd, which is also signed to Elefant Traks. Over the first decade of the label's existence, The Herd released four studio albums on the label. Jane Tyrrell, a singer joined the band during the recording of The Sun Never Sets, the band's third album. Also during this period, Levinson released three solo albums under his Urthboy moniker with the label.

=== 2008–2011: 10th anniversary, Joelistics ===
In November 2008, Elefant Traks celebrated its 10th anniversary with an event held at The Forum venue in Moore Park, Sydney.

Joelistics (TZU) joined the label's roster as a solo artist in early 2011, prior to the release of his first solo album, Voyager. After the announcement, Ozi Batla stated:

"We’ve been mates for ages—we’ve shared a lot of creative, outrageous and funny times—it feels like Joelistics is already part of the fam[ily], he’s a natural fit for Elefant Traks and the album is sick".

=== 2012–2013: Jimblah, Sky'High, Dr Seuss tribute, 15th anniversary ===
As of 2012 the label had signed six musical acts and released over 50 albums since its inception. In September 2012, the label announced a new signing. Jimblah, an Aboriginal Australian producer, MC and singer, was revealed as the new Elefant Traks artist. Levinson explained being introduced to Jimblah's music in an October 2013 blog post:

"The moment Jimblah stopped me in my tracks was with his debut album Face the Fire ... I clearly remember ... tears welling up in my eyes as I played the title track—and its heartbreaking outro ... That moment set off a chain of events that included Jimblah enthusiastically agreeing to join up with Elefant Traks."

On 11 November 2012 the label performed a tribute to children's author Dr. Seuss. Featuring over 25 musical performers, the event occurred at the Sydney Opera House in Sydney, Australia.

The "15: A Celebration of 15 Years of Elefant Traks" anniversary event was announced in early September 2013 and a two-night format is scheduled for only two Australian capital cities—Sydney and Melbourne. The event featured the label's 2013 roster, in addition to the solo debut of singer Jane Tyrrell. In relation to the survival of the label after fifteen years, Kennedy stated that the event is like "a castle in the sky", as it should not have occurred.

=== 2014–2017: One Day, Jane Tyrrell, L-FRESH The LION, B Wise, OKENYO, Joyride ===
The Astronomy Class album Mekong Delta Sunrise was released in late April 2014. When asked about what the group wanted to achieve with the album, Kennedy replied:

"What we wanted to cover was our experiences of modern Cambodia and the history of the music that we were referencing. We wanted to try and tell some of the story of the Cambodia of the 60s and 70s. We had been excited by the songs that we were hearing and it didn’t feel right to rap just anything over it. We wanted for new listeners to understand something about Cambodia and the music."

The One Day hip-hop collective—consisting of Horrorshow, Jackie Onassis, Spit Syndicate and Joyride—released its debut album Mainline through the Elefant Traks label on 1 August 2014. Mainline ranked in second place on the ARIA albums chart during the first week of its release.

Tyrrell's debut solo album, Echoes in the Aviary, was released on Elefant Traks on 17 October 2014. Recorded over a six-month period, the album was co-produced by Tyrrell and features collaborations with Australian band PVT, Dustin McLean (Axolotl, Diafrix), Paul Kelly and Count Bounce. Tyrrell explained after the album was released:

"I get really annoyed when people are like, "So what kind of singer are you?” That just seems so limiting to you as an artist—I like to sing operatic, in jazz, soul, blues, I’m up for everything. I wanted to try and showcase that across the album and be a different character for each song and have different instruments ... I just wanted to show that dynamic approach."

A new Elefant Traks signing, L-Fresh The LION, was announced in January 2015. In the promotional video, images of the Sydney suburb of Liverpool are shown, while Levinson recalls his first meeting with the artist, at which he detected a "wisdom" that reminded him of Sabir.

In 2016 Elefant Traks signed OKENYO (Zindzi Okenyo) who released her debut EP THE WAVE on 18 May 2018 featuring 'Woman's World'.

=== 2018–2023: Homeward Bound, 20th Anniversary ===
In 2018 Elefant Traks announced their newest signing, Homeward Bound, a new project by Jimblah and Georgia B. Their debut single 'Island' was released in September; a song that showed a different side of both Jimblah and Georgia, who had previously been associated with the former's hip-hop releases. Of their new music, Homeward Bound described:

"Ultimately, we want the audience to know that we are open to explore music as a whole, to not be boxed in when it comes down to genres. We are both huge fans of music in general, so we want that to be evident in the music we play with. As more of this first record comes to light, it will become more and more evident of where we gravitate sonically, and that’s quite a big spectrum".

In October, OKENYO debuted a new single in 'Hang Your Hat' as a follow-up to THE WAVE EP, working with longtime collaborator Lionel Towers.

Elefant Traks' 20th-anniversary celebrations were announced for November, with an east coast roll out of parties and conversation sessions highlighting the history and legacy of the Elefant Traks label. Artists including Horrorshow, B Wise, The Herd, OKENYO, Jayteehazard, L-FRESH The LION, Homeward Bound and Astronomy Class performed at the ET20 parties held at The Corner Hotel in Melbourne, The Valley Drive-In in Brisbane and at Sydney's Factory Theatre.

The 'ET20' events also incorporated special live shows from Horrorshow, Urthboy and Hermitude. In Sydney and Melbourne, Horrorshow performed with The Metropolitan Orchestra, Hermitude recreated their catalogue with a live band in an intimate environment at Melbourne's 24 Moons and Sydney's Marrickville Bowling Club, while Urthboy celebrated 11 years of his acclaimed record, The Signal, with two exclusive live shows.

Along with the live shows, Elefant Traks also hosted one-off in Conversation sessions in Melbourne, Sydney and Brisbane – 'The Elefant in the Room'. The sessions, hosted by Coda Conduct, saw Elefant Traks artists including OKENYO, Joyride, L-FRESH The LION, Jane Tyrrell and Ozi Batla, as well as label founder Kenny Sabir, sharing their stories and memories of their time with Elefant Traks.

=== 2024: Defunction and 25th anniversary ===
On 7 March 2024, a video was posted on the Elefant Traks social media accounts, featuring Urthboy announcing that the label would be "calling it a day". The video shows him revisiting some of Elefant Traks's old offices; the second one, located on Faversham Street in Marrickville, had since been demolished by developers.

Shortly after this announcement, on 24 May, Traksewt and Urthboy were interviewed by The Guardian to discuss this decision further. Urthboy, over the phone, stated:

"You can look at streaming numbers and ticket sales and see things aren’t working like they once were. And [it’s] the unforgiving environment that new and emerging artists are walking out into. [...] Our industry has always been gamblers and thieves and crooks, and wholesome, good-hearted people trying to make a difference, we were not affiliated with any majors and have never been a subsidiary of anyone. When things dry up, we can’t just kind of call on daddy or some sort of [venture capitalist] to step in. It’s a lot more real."

To celebrate the label's legacy (and its 25th anniversary), many of the artists on the label held three live performances together, known as the 'ET25 Finale Party'; performing at the Sydney Opera House on the 26th of May (with special guest SKY'HIGH), The Tivoli in Brisbane on the 8th of June and at the Melbourne Recital Centre on the 15th of June (with special guest Monkey Marc and an extra Matinee show added as well.) A garage sale was also hosted, selling rare Elefant Traks paraphernalia.

== Activism ==
In response to the proposed dumping of around 3 million cubic metres of dredged seabed onto the Great Barrier Reef, a legal fighting team was formed by World Wide Fund for Nature (WWF)-Australia and the Australian Marine Conservation Society (AMCS) in late 2013/early 2014. The legal team received further support in April 2014, following the release of the "Sounds for the Reef" musical fundraising project. Produced by Straightup, the digital album features Elefant Traks artists The Herd and Sietta, in addition to artists such as John Butler, Missy Higgins, The Cat Empire, Fat Freddys Drop, The Bamboos (featuring Kylie Auldist) and Resin Dogs. Released on 7 April, the album's 21 songs were sold on the Bandcamp website.

== Awards ==
The label was nominated for 'Best Independent Label' at the 2006 Australian Dance Music Awards.

Urthboy's album, The Signal, was nominated for the 2007 Australian Independent Record (AIR) Awards and the 2007 J Award. The Urthboy album, Spitshine, received the 2010 AIR Award for 'Best Independent Hip Hop/Urban Album'.

The Herd won both the Best Independent Artist and Best Urban/Hip Hop Album for 2008 AIR Awards.

The Last Kinection won the "Band of the Year" category at the 2012 Deadly awards.

Both Hermitude ("Best Dance/Electronic" and "Best Video") and The Herd ("Best Urban") were nominated in the 2012 ARIA Awards.

The "Dr Seuss meets Elefant Traks" musical performance was nominated in the "Best Music Event" category of the 2012 SMACS (Sydney Music, Arts and Culture Awards), run by Sydney community radio station FBi.

In 2012 Urthboy and Hermitude were nominated for the 8th Australian Music Prize (AMP) for their respective Smokey's Haunt and HyperParadise albums – it represented the first time that two Elefant Traks nominees were nominated as part of the awards event, while it was the third occasion that Urthboy has been nominated for the AMP. In response to the AMP nomination, Hermitude stated, "We're totally stoked as a predominantly instrumental duo to be short listed for The Amp!" Hyperparadise was the eventual winner of the 8th AMP.

King Amongst Many was also nominated, alongside Urthboy's Smokey's Haunt, at the 2013 ARIA Awards for "Best Urban Album".

Two Elefant Traks releases appeared in the Full Shortlist for the 9th AMP, which was unveiled at the Sidney Myer Music Bowl in Melbourne, Australia on 26 January 2014. Selected from a Longlist of 43 artists, Horrorshow was nominated for King Amongst Many and Jimblah was nominated for Phoenix. Other artists in the Full Shortlist included Beaches and Big Scary and the judges were presented with an original list of 300 albums.

In 2016, L-FRESH The Lion and Urthboy were nominated in the "Best Urban Album" ARIA Award for their respective records, Become and The Past Beats Inside Me Like a Second Heartbeat.

B Wise's debut album Area Famous was nominated for "Record of The Year' at the 2018 FBi SMAC Awards, to be held in Sydney in February 2019.

== Current artists ==
- Astronomy Class
- B Wise
- Coda Conduct
- The Herd
- Hermitude
- Horrorshow
- Jane Tyrrell
- Jimblah
- Joelistics
- L-FRESH the Lion
- OKENYO (Zindzi Okenyo)
- Ozi Batla
- The Last Kinection
- Sky'High
- Unkle Ho
- Urthboy

== Discography ==
| Cat# | Artist | Title | Release date | Notes |
|---|---|---|---|---|
| ACE001 | Elefant Traks | Cursive Writing | 1 November 1998 | |
| ACE002 | Various Artists | Food To Eat Music By | 1 March 1999 | |
| ACE003 | U.BIN | 2.0 | 1 May 1999 | |
| ACE005 | Pilfernators | Grass Clippings | 1 August 1999 | |
| ACE006 | Explanetary | In on the Deal | 1 November 1999 | |
| ACE007 | The Herd | The Herd | 1 September 2001 | Spawned The Herd's first hit song, "Scallops", which gained significant airplay on Triple J. |
| ACE009 | The Herd | An Elefant Never Forgets | 9 February 2003 | |
| ACE010 | Hermitude | Alleys To Valleys | 24 August 2003 | |
| ACE011 | Apsci | Get It Twisted | 16 November 2003 | |
| ACE013 | Urthboy | Distant Sense of Random Menace | 8 August 2003 | |
| ACE012 | Various Artists | The Elefant Collection Vol. 1 | 15 February 2004 | |
| ACE015 | Pasobionic | Empty Beats For Lonely Rappers | 30 April 2004 | |
| ACE016 | Combat Wombat | Unsound $ystem | 26 June 2004 | |
| ACE018 | Unkle Ho | Roads to Roma | 20 September 2004 | |
| ACE019 | Hermitude | Tales of the Drift | 9 November 2004 | |
| ACE21.5 | The Herd | The Sun Never Sets | 17 March 2005 | |
| ACE023 | Various Artists | Trampled (Remix Album) | 14 July 2005 | |
| ACE027 | Astronomy Class | Exit Strategy | 29 September 2005 | |
| ACE029 | Mista Savona | Melbourne Meets Kingston | 9 February 2006 | |
| ACE031 | Unkle Ho | Circus Maximus | 11 May 2006 | |
| ACE032 | Urthboy | The Signal | 13 July 2007 | Nominated for the 2007 Australian Independent Record (AIR) Awards and the 2007 J Awards. |
| ACE039 | The Herd | Summerland | 24 May 2008 | Won 'Best Urban/Hip Hop Album' in the 2008 Australian Independent Record (AIR) Awards. |
| ACE043 | Hermitude | Threads | 26 September 2008 | |
| ACE041 | Horrorshow | The Grey Space | 15 August 2008 | ARIA Award nominated for Urban Album of the Year. |
| ACE046 | Astronomy Class | Pursuit of Happiness | 1 May 2009 | |
| ACE047 | Unkle Ho | Subterranea | 3 July 2009 | |
| ACE051 | Urthboy | Spitshine | 29 August 2009 | Spitshine received the 2010 Australian Independent Record (AIR) Award for 'Best Independent Hip Hop/Urban Album'. |
| ACE052 | Horrorshow | Inside Story | 3 October 2009 | |
| ACE053 | Mista Savona | Warn The Nation | 20 March 2010 | |
| ACE055 | Ozi Batla | Wild Colonial | 14 May 2010 | |
| ACE059 | Joelistics | Voyager | 20 May 2011 | |
| ACE061 | Sietta | The Seventh Passenger | 22 July 2011 | |
| ACE062 | The Herd | Future Shade | 26 August 2011 | Nominated for Best Independent Urban/Hip Hop Album Australian Independent Record (AIR) Awards 2012. Peaked at 22 in the ARIA Album Charts. Honourable mention finalist for 'A Thousand Lives' in the International Songwriting Competition 2011. |
| ACE066 | The Last Kinection | Next of Kin | 28 October 2011 | |
| ACE069 | Hermitude | Hyperparadise | 3 February 2012 | Winner of the 8th Australian Music Prize (AMP). |
| ACE076 | Sky'High | Forever Sky'High | 25 May 2012 | |
| ACE077 | Urthboy | Smokey's Haunt | 12 October 2012 | Nominated for the 8th Australian Music Prize (AMP). |
| ACE088 | Horrorshow | King Amongst Many | 2 August 2013 | ARIA Award nominated for Urban Album of the Year. Shortlisted for the 9th Australian Music Prize (AMP). Nominated for a J Award Album of the Year. Debuted at No. 2 in the ARIA charts. |
| ACE090 | Jimblah | Phoenix | 11 October 2013 | Nominated for the 9th Australian Music Prize (AMP). |
| ACE094 | Sietta | The Invisible River | 21 February 2014 | |
| ACE098 | Astronomy Class | Mekong Delta Sunrise | 25 April 2014 | |
| ACE101 | Joelistics | Blue Volume | 20 June 2014 | |
| ACE102 | Jane Tyrrell | Echoes in the Aviary | 17 October 2014 | |
| ACE116 | Jayteehazard | Red Shift | 6 March 2015 | |
| ACE118 | Hermitude | Dark Night Sweet Light | 15 May 2015 | |
| ACE138 | Urthboy | The Past Beats Inside Me Like A Second Heartbeat | 4 March 2016 | |
| ACE144 | L-FRESH The LION | Become | 13 May 2016 | ARIA Award nominated for Urban Album of the Year. Feature album on FBi Radio, Radio Adelaide and 2SER-FM. |
| ACE154 | B Wise | Semi Pro EP | 23 September 2016 | |
| ACE158 | Horrorshow | Bardo State | 24 February 2017 | |
| ACE162 | OKENYO | The Wave | 18 May 2018 | |

== Compilation releases ==
- Cursive Writing (1998)
- Food to Eat Music By (1999)
- Elefant Collection Vol. 1 (2004)
- Trampled - The Elefant Traks Remix Album (2006)

== See also ==
- List of record labels
