= Easy to Love =

Easy to Love may refer to:

- "You'd Be So Easy to Love", a song by Cole Porter
- Easy to Love (1934 film), starring Genevieve Tobin and Adolphe Menjou
- Easy to Love (1953 film), starring Esther Williams
- Easy to Love (Buck Hill album)
- Easy to Love (Kalil Wilson album)
- Easy to Love (Roland Hanna album)
- Easy to Love, 2006 album by Roberta Gambarini
- Easy to Love, 2010 album by Jaydee Bixby
- Easy to Love, a song by The Jezabels from their 2009 EP She's So Hard and their 2011 album Prisoner
- "Easy to Love" (For Real song)
- "Easy to Love" (Leo Sayer song), from Thunder in My Heart
- "Easy to Love", a 2014 song by Bucie
- "Easy to Love" (Jake and the Fatman), a 1989 television episode
