= APRA Music Awards of 2011 =

Australasian award series

- Date: 21 June 2011
- Location: CarriageWorks; Sydney, Australia
- Hosted by: Andrew Hansen; Chris Taylor

Highlights
- Most nominations: John Butler Trio (5)
- Website: apra-amcos.com.au/2011APRAMusicAwards/index.html

The Australasian Performing Right Association Awards of 2011 (generally known as APRA Awards) are a series of related awards which include the APRA Music Awards, Art Music Awards, and Screen Music Awards. The APRA Music Awards of 2011 was the 29th annual ceremony by the Australasian Performing Right Association (APRA) and the Australasian Mechanical Copyright Owners Society (AMCOS) to award outstanding achievements in contemporary songwriting, composing and publishing. The ceremony was held on 21 June 2011 at CarriageWorks in Sydney, Australia. The Art Music Awards were introduced in 2011 to replace the Classical Music Awards (last held in 2009) and were distributed on 3 May. They are sponsored by APRA and the Australian Music Centre (AMC) to "recognise achievement in the composition, performance, education and presentation of Australian music". The Screen Music Awards were issued on 14 November by APRA and Australian Guild of Screen Composers (AGSC) at the City Recital Hall, Sydney which "acknowledges excellence and innovation in the genre of screen composition".

On 26 May nominations for the APRA Music Awards were announced on multiple news sources, with John Butler Trio being the most nominated artist. This ceremony was hosted by comedians Andrew Hansen and Chris Taylor. Also featured in the ceremony were cover versions of nominated works. A total of 12 awards were presented. Paul Kelly was honoured with the Ted Albert Award for Outstanding Services to Australian Music. Angus and Julia Stone tied with Jet for the most awards won that evening, the former winning both the Songwriter of the Year and the Song of the Year awards and the latter winning Most Played Australian Work and Rock Work of the Year for their song "Seventeen".

== APRA Music Awards ==
=== Blues & Roots Work of the Year ===
Title and/or artist	Writer(s)	Publisher(s)	Result
"10:10" – Beautiful Girls	Matt McHugh	—N/a	Nominated
"Close to You" – John Butler Trio	John Butler	Family Music	Won
"Don't Wait" – Beautiful Girls	Matt McHugh	—N/a	Nominated
"One Way Road" – John Butler Trio	John Butler	Family Music	Nominated
"Walking" – Ash Grunwald	Ash Grunwald	Mushroom Music	Nominated

=== Breakthrough Songwriter of the Year ===
Title and/or artist	Writer(s)	Publisher(s)	Result
"Plans" – Birds of Tokyo – Birds of Tokyo	Anthony Jackson, Ian Kenny, Adam Spark, Adam Weston	Mushroom Music	Nominated
Dark Storm – The Jezabels	Nikolas Kaloper, Samuel Lockwood, Hayley McGlone, Heather Shannon	Mushroom Music	Nominated
InnerSpeaker – Tame Impala	Kevin Parker	Sony/ATV Music Publishing Australia	Nominated
"Letter" – Get Out While You Can – Dan Sultan	Dan Sultan, Scott Wilson	Mushroom Music	Nominated
I Believe You Liar – Washington	Megan Washington	J Albert & Son	Won

=== Country Work of the Year ===
Title and/or artist	Writer(s)	Publisher(s)	Result
"Can't Change a Thing" – Catherine Britt	Catherine Britt, Melanie Horsnell	EMI Music Publishing Australia, Perfect Pitch Publishing^{[note 1]}	Nominated
"Hell Yeah" – McAlister Kemp	Drew McAlister, Troy Kemp	ABC Music Publishing administered by Mushroom Music^{[note 2]}	Nominated
"Little Bird" – Kasey Chambers	Kasey Chambers	Mushroom Music	Won
"Planet Country" – Lee Kernaghan	Lee Kernaghan, Colin Buchanan, Matthew Scullion, Garth Porter	Orient Pacific Music, Universal Music Publishing, Piney Range Publishing, Perfect Pitch Publishing^{[note 3]}	Nominated
"Wrapped Up Good" – The McClymonts	Brooke McClymont, Mollie McClymont, Samantha McClymont, Nathan Chapman	EMI Music Publishing Australia, Sony/ATV Music Publishing Australia^{[note 4]}	Nominated

=== Dance Work of the Year ===
Title and/or artist	Writer(s)	Publisher(s)	Result
"Chemical Rush" – Brian McFadden	Brian McFadden, Antonio Egizii, David Musumeci, James Maas	Sony/ATV Music Publishing Australia, EMI Music Publishing Australia^{[note 5]}	Nominated
"Free Fallin" – Zoe Badwi	Amy Pearson, Cameron Denny, Paul Zala	EMI Music Publishing Australia, PeppermintBlue Publishing administered by Warner Chappell Music Australia^{[note 6]}	Won
"Hello" – The Potbelleez	Ilan Kidron, Jonathan Murphy, David Greene, Justin Shave, Marisa Lock	MCDJ Music/Universal Music Publishing^{[note 7]}	Nominated
"Magic Fountain" – Art vs. Science	James Finn, Daniel McNamee, Daniel Williams	Kobalt Music Publishing Australia	Nominated
"Sometimes" – Miami Horror	Benjamin Plant, Daniel Whitechurch, Joshua Heptinstall	—N/a	Nominated

=== International Work of the Year ===
Title and/or artist	Writer(s)	Publisher(s)	Result
"California Gurls" – Katy Perry	Calvin Broadus, Katheryn Hudson, Martin Sandberg, Lukasz Gottwald, Bonnie McKee, Benjamin Levin, Brian Wilson, Michael Love	EMI Music Publishing Australia, Kobalt Music Publishing Australia, Warner Chappell Music Australia, Mushroom Music, J Albert & Son^{[note 8]}	Nominated
"Fireflies" – Owl City	Adam Young	Universal/MCA Music Publishing	Nominated
"Hey, Soul Sister" – Train	Patrick Monahan, Amund Bjørklund, Espen Lind	EMI Music Publishing Australia	Won
"O.M.G" – Usher	Will Adams	Mushroom Music	Nominated
"Whataya Want from Me" – Adam Lambert	Alecia Moore, Martin Sandberg, Johan Schuster	EMI Music Publishing Australia, Kobalt Music Publishing Australia^{[note 9]}	Nominated

=== Most Played Australian Work ===
Title and/or artist	Writer(s)	Publisher(s)	Result
"Burn Your Name" – Powderfinger	Jonathan Coghill, John Collins, Bernard Fanning, Ian Haug, Darren Middleton	Universal Music Publishing MGB Australia	Nominated
"Close to You" – John Butler Trio	John Butler	Family Music	Nominated
"One Way Road" – John Butler Trio	John Butler	Family Music	Nominated
"Plans" – Birds of Tokyo	Anthony Jackson, Ian Kenny, Adam Spark, Adam Weston	Mushroom Music	Nominated
"Seventeen" – Jet	Chris Cester, Nick Cester, Cameron Muncey	Mushroom Music	Won

=== Rock Work of the Year ===
Title and/or artist	Writer(s)	Publisher(s)	Result
"Baby I'm Getting Better – Gyroscope	Daniel Sanders, Robert Nassif, Brad Campbell, Zoran Trivic	Mushroom Music	Nominated
"Burn Your Name" – Powderfinger	Jonathan Coghill, John Collins, Bernard Fanning, Ian Haug, Darren Middleton	Universal Music Publishing MGB Australia	Nominated
"Lying" – Amy Meredith	Joel Chapman, Robert Conley, Christian Lo Russo	Sony/ATV Music Publishing Australia	Nominated
"Plans" – Birds of Tokyo	Anthony Jackson, Ian Kenny, Adam Spark, Adam Weston	Mushroom Music	Nominated
"Seventeen" – Jet	Chris Cester, Nick Cester, Cameron Muncey	Mushroom Music	Won

=== Song of the Year ===
Title and/or artist	Writer(s)	Publisher(s)	Result
"Big Jet Plane" – Angus and Julia Stone	Angus Stone, Julia Stone	Sony/ATV Music Publishing Australia	Won
"Clap Your Hands" – Sia	Samuel Dixon, Sia Furler	Mushroom Music, EMI Music Publishing Australia^{[note 10]}	Nominated
"Little Bird" – Kasey Chambers	Kasey Chambers	Mushroom Music	Nominated
"Plans" – Birds of Tokyo	Anthony Jackson, Ian Kenny, Adam Spark, Adam Weston	Mushroom Music	Nominated
"Revolution" – John Butler Trio	John Butler	Family Music	Nominated

=== Urban Work of the Year ===
Title and/or artist	Writer(s)	Publisher(s)	Result
"Addicted" – Bliss N Eso	Noam Dishon, Max MacKinnon, Jonathan Notley	Mushroom Music	Nominated
"Down By the River" – Bliss N Eso	Noam Dishon, Max MacKinnon, Jonathan Notley	Mushroom Music	Nominated
"Light You Burned" – Hilltop Hoods	Barry Francis, Matthew Lambert, Daniel Smith, Daniel Rankine	Sony/ATV Music Publishing Australia^{[note 11]}	Nominated
"Rapunzel" – Drapht	Paul Ridge, Daniel Rankine, Larry Siler	—N/a	Nominated
"Who's That Girl" – Guy Sebastian featuring Eve	Guy Sebastian, Eve Jeffers	Universal Music Publishing, Universal/MCA Music Publishing^{[note 12]}	Won

=== Most Played Australia Work Overseas ===
Title and/or artist	Writer(s)	Publisher(s)	Result
"Highway to Hell" – AC/DC	Angus Young, Malcolm Young, Ronald Scott	J Albert & Son	Won

=== Songwriter of the Year ===
- Angus and Julia Stone

=== Ted Albert Award for Outstanding Services to Australian Music ===
- Paul Kelly

== Art Music Awards ==
=== Work of the Year – Instrumental ===
Title	Composer	Performer	Result
Fractured Again	Damien Ricketson	Ensemble Offspring	Nominated
String Quartet No. 2	Paul Stanhope	Pavel Haas Quartet	Won

=== Work of the Year – Jazz ===
Title	Composer	Performer	Result
Ashes to Ashes	Johannes Luebbers	Johannes Luebbers Dectet	Won
That Which Is Not Fleeting	Sean Foran	Misinterprotato and Topology	Nominated
The Gathering	Stuart Hunter	Stuart Hunter (piano), Simon Barker (drums), Cameron Undy (bass), Matthew Keegan (sax), Julien Wilson (sax), James Greening (tromebone/pocket trumpet)	Nominated

=== Work of the Year – Orchestral ===
Title	Composer	Performer	Result
A Dream of Drowning	Andrew Ford / Tim Winton^{[note 13]}	West Australian Symphony Orchestra, Teddy Tahu Rhodes (soloist), Paul Daniel (conductor)	Nominated
Chronicles	James Ledger	West Australian Symphony Orchestra, Paul Daniel (conductor)	Won
Golden Kitsch	Elena Kats-Chernin	Sydney Youth Orchestra, Claire Edwardes (soloist)	Nominated
Lightfall (for Horn and Orchestra)	Christopher Gordon	Sydney Symphony Orchestra, Robert Johnson (soloist), Richard Gill	Nominated

=== Work of the Year – Vocal or Choral ===
Title	Composer / librettist	Performer	Result
Beach Burial	Andrew Schultz / Kenneth Slessor^{[note 14]}	Sydney Philharmonia Choirs and Orchestra, Brett Weymark (conductor)	Nominated
Deserts of Exile	Paul Stanhope / Jabra Ibrahim Jabra^{[note 15]}	Choir of Trinity College, Cambridge, Stephen Layton (conductor)	Won
Iphighenia in Exile	Helen Gifford / Richard Meredith^{[note 16]}	Aphids, Chamber Made Opera, Speak Percussion	Nominated

=== Performance of the Year ===
Title	Composer / librettist	Performer	Result
Refractions	Anthony Pateras	Clocked Out and Speak Percussion	Nominated
From the Hungry Waiting Country	Elliott Gyger / Vincent Buckley, William Hart-Smith, Gwen Harwood, A.D. Hope, Mark O'Connor, Elizabeth Riddell, Randolph Stow	Halcyon	Nominated
The Origin Cycle	Elliott Gyger, Kate Neal, Barry Conyngham, Rosalind Page, Elena Kats-Chernin, Nicholas Vines, Paul Stanhope, Dan Walker	Jane Sheldon (soprano), Ensemble Offspring, Roland Peelman (conductor)	Won
Kalkadunga Man	William Barton, Ross Edwards, Sarah Hopkins, Rosalind Page, Dan Walker	The Song Company, William Barton (soloist)	Nominated

=== Award for Excellence by an Organisation or an Individual ===
Organisation / individual	Work	Result
Clocked Out	2009–2010 Annual Programs	Won
Jane Sheldon, Peter Godfrey-Smith	The Origin Cycle Project	Nominated
Southern Cross Soloists	2009–2010 Annual Programs	Nominated
Way Out West	Developing Australian jazz music, touring nationally and internationally, innovative new work.	Nominated

=== Award for Excellence in Music Education ===
Organisation / individual	Work	Result
Cat Hope	Contribution to Music Education in Western Australia	Nominated
Joan Sutherland Performing Arts Centre	Composer-in-Focus 2010 with Ross Edwards	Won
Ku-ring-gai Philharmonic	Commissioning Hide and Squeak by Damian Barbeler and the 2010 Kids Proms concerts	Nominated
The Australian Voices	Young Composers' School	Nominated

=== Award for Excellence in a Regional Area ===
Organisation / individual	Work	Result
Arts in the Valley	2009 Festival in Kangaroo Valley, NSW	Nominated
Four Winds Festival	2010 Festival in Bermagui, NSW	Nominated
Hunter Singers	Commissioning and performing Australian Choral Music, NSW	Nominated
Tura New Music	2009–2010 Regional Program, WA.	Won

=== Award for Excellence in Experimental Music ===
Organisation / individual	Work	Result
Cat Hope	Decibel's 2009–2010 Annual Programs	Won
Damien Ricketson, Ensemble Offspring, Elaine Miles, Andrew Wholley, Paul Gough – Pimmon, Bob Scott, Matthew Marshall	Fractured Again Project	Nominated
Madeleine Flynn, Tim Humphrey	Constellation and Epi-thet Project	Nominated

== Screen Music Awards ==
=== Feature Film Score of the Year ===
Title	Composer	Result
Mad Bastards	Alex Lloyd, Alan Pigram, Stephen Pigram	Nominated
Snowtown	Jed Kurzel	Won
Legend of the Guardians	David Hirschfelder	Nominated
The Way Back	Burkhard Dallwitz	Nominated

=== Best Music for an Advertisement ===
Title	Composer	Result
Cascade – "The Feel"	Blair Joscelyne	Nominated
Pure Blonde – "Pardon"	Ramesh Sathiah, Gerard Fitzgerald	Nominated
SBS – "Films 2"	Michael Yezerski	Nominated
VW Passat – "Change Rooms"	Elliott Wheeler	Won

=== Best Music for Children's Television ===
Title	Composer	Result
Giggle & Hoot: Christmas Special	Sean Peter	Nominated
Gravity	Henrique Dib	Nominated
K-9 – Series 1: Episode 26: "Eclipse of the Korven"	Christopher Elves	Won
My Place – Season 2: Episode 1 – "Henry 1878"	Roger Mason	Nominated

=== Best Music for a Documentary ===
Title	Composer	Result
Cane Toads: The Conquest	Martin Armiger	Nominated
Jandamarra's War	Ash Gibson Greig, Petris Torres	Nominated
Lachlan Macquarie: Father of Australia	Matteo Zingales	Won
The Silent Epidemic	Christopher Elves	Nominated

=== Best Music for a Mini-Series or Telemovie ===
Title	Composer	Result
Cloudstreet	Bryony Marks	Nominated
East West 101 – Series 3: Episode 1 – "The Hero's Standard"	Guy Gross	Nominated
Paper Giants: The Birth of Cleo	Stephen Rae	Nominated
Underbelly Files: Tell Them Lucifer Was Here	Burkhard Dallwitz	Won

=== Best Music for a Short Film ===
Title	Composer	Result
Collision	Mike Darren	Nominated
Polo's Robot	Dale Cornelius	Nominated
The Maker	Paul Halley	Nominated
The Missing Key	Kathryn Brownhill, Miles Nicholas, Jonathan Nix	Won

=== Best Music for a Television Series or Serial ===
Series or Serial	Episode title	Composer	Result
Rake	—N/a	Michael Lira, David McCormack, Antony Partos	Won
Rush	"Series 3: Episode16"	Stephen Rae	Nominated
Tangle	"Season 2: Lost and Found"	Bryony Marks	Nominated
Who Do You Think You Are?	Series 3	Ash Gibson Greig	Nominated

=== Best Original Song Composed for the Screen ===
Song title	Work	Composer	Result
"Dream On"	The Missing Key	Miles Nicholas	Won
"Negotiate"	Yes We Canberra!	Andrew Hansen, Chris Taylor	Nominated
"Sweet Dreams: Sky Boat"	Giggle & Hoot	Cain Horton, Paul Kingston	Nominated
"Won't Look Back"	Mad Bastards	Brendan Fletcher, Alex Lloyd, Alan Pigram, Stephen Pigram	Nominated

=== Best Soundtrack Album ===
Title	Composer	Result
Mad Bastards	Alex Lloyd, Alan Pigram, Stephen Pigram	Nominated
Red Hill	Dmitri Golovko	Nominated
Road Train: Road Kill Soundtrack	Rafael May	Won
The Lost Thing	Michael Yezerski	Nominated

=== Best Television Theme ===
Title	Composer	Result
Adam Hills In Gordon Street Tonight	Kit Warhurst	Nominated
AFP	David Chapman	Nominated
Message Stick	Cliff Bradley	Nominated
Scariacs	Haydn Walker	Won

=== Most Performed Screen Composer – Australia ===
Composer	Result
Adam Gock, Dinesh Wicks	Won
Jay Stewart	Nominated
Neil Sutherland	Nominated
Brenton White	Nominated

=== Most Performed Screen Composer – Overseas ===
Composer	Result
Ricky Edwards	Nominated
Ric Formosa	Nominated
David Hirschfelder	Nominated
Neil Sutherland	Won

== Notes ==
=== Footnotes ===
1. Published by EMI Music Publishing Australia for Catherine Britt; Published by Perfect Pitch Publishing for Melanie Horsnell.
2. Published by ABC Music Publishing administered by Mushroom Music for Drew McAlister.
3. Published by Orient Pacific Music for Lee Kernaghan; Published by Universal Music Publishing for Colin Buchanan; Published by Piney Range Publishing for Matthew Scullion; Published by Perfect Pitch Publishing for Garth Porter.
4. Published by EMI Music Publishing Australia for Brooke McClymont, Mollie McClymont and Samantha McClymont; Published by Sony/ATV Music Publishing Australia for Nathan Chapman.
5. Published by Sony/ATV Music Publishing Australia for Brian McFadden; Published by EMI Music Publishing Australia for Antonio Egizii and David Musumeci.
6. Published by EMI Music Publishing Australia for Amy Pearson; Published by PeppermintBlue Publishing administered by Warner Chappell Music Australia for Cameron Denny and Paul Zala.
7. Published by MCDJ Music/Universal Music Publishing for Ilan Kidron, Jonathan Murphy, David Greene and Justin Shave.
8. Published by EMI Music Publishing Australia for Calvin Broadus; Published by Kobalt Music Publishing Australia for Katheryn Hudson, Martin Sandberg, Lukasz Gottwald, Bonnie McKee and Benjamin Levin; Published by Warner Chappell Music Australia for Katheryn Hudson; Published by Mushroom Music for Bonnie McKee.
9. Published by EMI Music Publishing Australia for Alecia Moore; Published by Kobalt Music Publishing Australia for Martin Sandberg and Johan Schuster.
10. Published by Mushroom Music for Samuel Dixon; Published by EMI Music Publishing Australia for Sia Furler.
11. Published by Sony/ATV Music Publishing Australia for Barry Francis, Matthew Lambert and Daniel Smith.
12. Published by Universal Music Publishing for Guy Sebastian; Published by Universal/MCA Music Publishing for Eve Jeffers.
13. A Dream of Drowning was written in 2009 for the opening concert of West Australian Symphony Orchestra's 2010 season. Teddy Tahu Rhodes sang baritone with the orchestra supplying vibraphone, harmonium, celesta, harp and strings. Andrew Ford composed the work using text from Tim Winton's novel Breath (2008).
14. Beach Burial was written in 2009 for the Sydney Philharmonia Choirs. Brett Weymark conducted the choirs with the Sydney Philharmonia Orchestra supplying flutes, oboes, clarinets in A, bassoon, contrabassoon, horns in F, trumpets in C, tenor trombones, bass trombone, timpani, strings. Andrew Schultz composed the work using text from Kenneth Slessor's poem of the same name (1944).
15. Deserts of Exile was written in 2007 for the Elysian Singers, Sydney Chamber Choir and Melbourne Symphony Orchestra Chorus. In 2010 it was performed by the Choir of Trinity College, Cambridge which was conducted by Stephen Layton. Paul Stanhope composed the work using text from Jabra Ibrahim Jabra's poem and excerpts from the Old Testament's Lamentations of Jeremiah.
16. Iphigenia in Exile was written in 1985 for a music theatre piece in one act. It was performed in 2010 by Deborah Kayser (soprano voice) with nine instrumentalists (piccolo, two clarinets, bass clarinet, mandolin, mandolin guitar, percussion (three players)) and a pre-recorded chorus of six women. Helen Gifford composed the work using text from Richard Meredith's libretto based on Iphigenia in Tauris (414–412 BC) by Euripides.
