= Renascent =

Renascent may refer to:

- Renascent (album), a 2026 album by the Durutti Column
- Renascent (band), a Finnish Christian metal band

== See also ==
- Renascent Misanthropy, a 2003 album by Astriaal
