= Byron Bay High School =

Secondary school in Byron Bay, Australia

Location
- 2 Arakwal Court; Byron Bay, New South Wales, Australia, 2481; 28°40′0.29″S 153°36′57.1″E

Information
- Type: Secondary school
- Motto: The Future is Ours
- Established: 15 May 1987 (39 years ago)
- School district: Ballina/Tweed
- Authority: New South Wales Department of Education
- Principal: Janine Marcus
- Staff: 56
- Grades: 7–12
- Enrollment: 774 (2019)
- Campus type: Inner regional
- Color
- Website: byronbay-h.schools.nsw.gov.au

Byron Bay High School is a government-funded co-educational comprehensive secondary day school, located in Byron Bay, New South Wales, Australia. The school, which is designed in the shape of a nautilus shell, opened on 15 May 1987. Facilities of the school include: agriculture centre, basketball courts, canteen, car park, changing rooms, library, multi-purpose centre, performing arts centre, sports centre and sports pitch. The indigenous country land the school was built on was Arakwal people of the Bundjalung nation.

== Notable alumni ==
- Anatole Serret – drummer of Parcels
- Beau Walker – professional surfer and television presenter
- Cleopatra Coleman – actress and model, appeared in The Last Man on Earth and In the Shadow of the Moon
- Dinesh Palipana OAM – doctor, legal professional and disability advocate
- Eka Darville – actor, appeared in Power Rangers RPM and Jessica Jones
- Hayley Mary – singer and lead vocalist of The Jezabels
- Heather Shannon – keyboardist and pianist of The Jezabels
- Katherine Hicks – actress, appeared in Rescue: Special Ops
- Marty Mayberry – para-alpine skier, competed at the 2006 and 2010 Winter Paralympics
- Nathan Baggaley – sprint canoeist and surfskier, competed at the 2004 Summer Olympics
- Parkway Drive – metalcore band
- Samuel Lockwood – guitarist of The Jezabels
- Stan Walker – singer, winner of Australian Idol in 2009
- Jake Duncombe – professional skateboarder

== See also ==
- List of government schools in New South Wales
- List of schools in the Northern Rivers and Mid North Coast
- Education in Australia
