= Marty Mayberry =

Australian Paralympic alpine skier (1986–2024)

Personal information
- Nationality: Australia
- Born: 9 February 1986 Byron Bay, New South Wales, Australia
- Died: 18 December 2024 (aged 38) Brisbane, Queensland, Australia

Sport
- Country: Australia
- Sport: Para-alpine skiing
- Events: Downhill; Super-G; Giant Slalom; Slalom; Super Combined

Achievements and titles
- Paralympic finals: 2006 Winter Paralympics; 2010 Winter Paralympics
Medal record
Paralympic Games
Silver medal – second place	2010 Vancouver	Downhill standing

Marty Mayberry (9 February 1986 – 18 December 2024) was an Australian double leg amputee LW3 classified Paralympic alpine skier. Mayberry lost both legs after contracting meningococcal disease when he was sixteen years old. This experience led him to study medicine, and he attended Griffith University and the University of Sydney where Mayberry pursued health science courses. Beyond the classroom, he wrote a paper on meningococcal disease, worked part-time on research about the disease, and talked about his experiences at a conference.

Having started as an able-bodied skier, Mayberry took up the disability sport. He made his national team debut in 2005, and went on to represent Australia at the 2006 Winter Paralympics the following year, when he did not medal. With the aid of a prosthesis, adjustments were made to his skiing legs, and he competed in several skiing competitions during 2007, 2008 and 2009. He was selected for the Australian 2010 Winter Paralympics team at a ceremony in Canberra in November 2009. Between then and the start of the Games, he participated in a few more competitions, including one where he picked up a gold medal, and participated in a national team training camp. He was selected as Australia's flag bearer for the opening ceremony. In competition, he earned a silver medal in the men's downhill standing event, finished 24th in the Super-G, was disqualified from the slalom, and failed to finish in the giant slalom. Following the games, he retired from skiing.

== Background ==
Mayberry was born on 9 February 1986, and grew up in Byron Bay, New South Wales, where he attended Byron Bay High School. By 2009, he resided in Queensland, and was living in Yeerongpilly, Queensland by 2010. In June 2010, he married a woman he met at a music festival.

Following a high school ski trip when he was in year 11, Mayberry contracted meningococcal disease at the age of 16, and this resulted in double below the knee amputations. He was in a coma for two weeks as a result of the disease, and, when he woke up at Byron Bay Hospital, learned his legs had been amputated. One of the things that motivated him to keep going during rehabilitation was the opportunity for sports.

Mayberry studied health sciences at Griffith University, and medicine at the University of Sydney. He went into medicine partly because of his illness during high school. He relocated to Sydney with his fiancée to do so not long before the start of the 2009–2010 ski season. In August 2010, he was the opening speaker at the Amanda Young Foundation Meningococcal Conference, and in 2010 and 2011, worked part-time at the Kids Research Institute at the Children's Hospital at Westmead, where he was in contact with "Robert Booy in his research on the psycho-social impact of meningococcal B on families." He wrote up his experiences in dealing with meningococcal infection in the Journal of Paediatrics and Child Health.

Mayberry lived by Gandhi's quote "Be the change you want to see in the world". He died in Brisbane on 18 December 2024, at the age of 38.

== Skiing ==
Mayberry was an LW3 classified skier who competed in standing events using a pair of artificial legs. Prior to contracting meningococcal, he was involved with skiing. He was back to competing at it on the disability side by 2004. When fully kitted out, he looked like an able-bodied skier, and was capable of skiing faster than 110 kilometres per hour (68 mph). He received support for his skiing from the Australian Institute of Sport, New South Wales Institute of Sport and the Australian Government Sports Training Grants program.

Mayberry had won medals at IPC Alpine Skiing World Cup events and the Paralympic Games. He made his Australian national team debut in 2005 at the European Cup Finals, and went on to represent Australia the following year at the 2006 Turin Games where he failed to medal in the four men's standing events he competed in. He finished 33rd in the downhill, 21st in the Giant Slalom, 19th in the Slalom and did not finish in the Super G. Mayberry attributed his poor performance at the 2006 Games to his prosthetic legs, which "just didn't feel right during the speed events in Italy." Following those Games, he worked with prosthetist Peter Farrand to develop new legs that would address the problems in Italy. Continuing to ski following the 2006 Games, he earned a gold medal at a World Cup event in 2007 in Slalom, and earned a bronze medal in slalom event at a 2008 World Cup competition.

During Australia's 2009–2010 summer, Mayberry was based in Europe and North America for training. At the 2009 World Championships, he had a pair of sixth places finished in the Super G and downhill events. That year, at a Spanish hosted IPC World Cup, he crashed in the giant slalom event and did not score a time. He was officially named to the Australian 2010 Winter Paralympics team in November 2009. A ceremony was held in Canberra with Australian Paralympic Committee president Greg Hartung and Minister for Sport Kate Ellis making the announcement. Mayberry was selected to the largest Winter Paralympics team that Australia had ever sent to the Games.

In 2010, he was the only elite skier with his type of disability in his classification. At the second to last World Cup event before the 2010 Games, on a course in Vancouver, Canada, he won a silver medal in the downhill with a time of 1:16.02. In Aspen, Colorado, at the last World Cup event before the 2010 Games, he won a gold medal in the downhill event. Prior to the start of the Games, he participated in a national team training camp in Vail, Colorado before the Aspen hosted World Cup. He and the rest of Australia's para-alpine team arrived in the Paralympic village on 9 March 2010.

As a 24-year-old, Mayberry competed in five events in the 2010 Paralympic games: downhill, super G, super combined, giant slalom, and slalom. His parents were in Vancouver to watch him compete. Mayberry won a silver medal in the men's standing downhill event where he tied with another skier, and had a combined time of 1:22.78 He finished 24th in the Super-G, was disqualified from the slalom event after missing a gate, and did not finish in the Giant Slalom. Following the Games, he returned with the team to Sydney, where he attended a press conference at Sydney Airport. He won an Australian Institute of Sport Sport Achievement Award in 2010. By September 2010, he had retired from elite skiing, one of several 2010 Winter Paralympic skiers to retire following the games. Others who retired at the same time he did included Shannon Dallas and Bart Bunting.
