= Synthia (album) =

2016 studio album by the Jezabels

Studio album by The Jezabels
- Released: 12 February 2016
- Studios: Jungle Studios, Attic Studios, & Oceanic Studios, Sydney
- Genres: Indie rock; alternative rock
- Length: 53:58
- Label: Dine Alone
- Producer: Lachlan Mitchell

The Jezabels chronology
The Brink (2014)	Synthia (2016)

Singles from Synthia
- 1. "Pleasure Drive" Released: 19 January 2016

Professional ratings
Review scores
Source	Rating
AllMusic	4/5 stars
The Arts Desk	4/5 stars
The Guardian	5/5 stars
Rolling Stone Australia	3.5/4 stars
Sputnikmusic	4.5/5 stars

Synthia is the third studio album by Australian indie rock band The Jezabels. It was self-released on 12 February 2016 and internationally through Dine Alone Records.

== Track listing ==
All tracks written by Hayley Mary, Heather Shannon, Sam Lockwood, and Nik Kaloper.

Synthia track listing
No.	Title	Length
1.	"Stand and Deliver"	7:29
2.	"My Love Is My Disease"	4:29
3.	"Smile"	4:51
4.	"Unnatural"	4:54
5.	"A Message from My Mothers Passed"	5:19
6.	"Come Alive"	5:47
7.	"Pleasure Drive"	5:20
8.	"Flowers in the Attic"	4:25
9.	"If Ya Want Me"	4:15
10.	"Stamina"	7:09

== Personnel ==
Synthia album personnel adapted from CD liner notes.

The Jezabels

- Hayley Mary – vocals
- Heather Shannon – keyboards
- Nik Kaloper – drums
- Samuel Lockwood – guitar

Additional personnel

- Lachlan Mitchell – engineer, producer
- Peter Katis – mixing at Tarquin Studios
- Greg Calbi – mastering at Sterling Sound
- Christopher Doyle & Co. – art direction, design
- Pierre Toussaint – photography

== Charts ==
Chart performance for Synthia
Chart (2016)	Peak position
Australian Albums (ARIA)	4
