= Astriaal =

Australian musical group

- Origin: Brisbane, Queensland, Australia
- Genres: Black Metal
- Years active: 1997–present
- Labels: Obsidian records, Aura Mystique Productions, Art of Propaganda.
- Members: Arzarkhel; Baaruhl; Daeimos; Gryphon; Svarogg
- Past members: Helthor; Murtach
- Website: https://www.facebook.com/AstriaalMCMXCVIII/app_2405167945

Astriaal are an Australian black metal band that formed in 1998, and are one of Australia's highest-profile black metal bands. The band have so far released 2 full-length albums and 3 EPs, and have supported well-known international acts such as Mayhem, Arcturus, Suffocation, Nile, Deeds of Flesh, Opeth and Pungent Stench. Astriaal's lyrics deal with Abyssal Theology, Nature and Misanthropy.

== History ==
The band was formed in 1997 as a three-piece consisting of Baaruhl, Gryphon, and Helthor. Baaruhl performed vocal duties early on until Arzarkhel joined the band. Astriaal released their debut demo Glories of the Nightsky in October 1998. To this day, Baaruhl, Gryphon and Arzarkhel are the core members of the band.

The band's first live show was in support of Nazxul in November 1998. The band recorded the Summoning the Essence of Ancient Wisdom EP between 1999 and 2000, before performing at the Metal for the Brain festival in Canberra, Australia. One year later, the EP Somnium Infinitus was a limited number (150) release for sale in honour of headlining the 2001 Metal for the Brain festival, it was also intended to preview some extra tracks for a to this day unreleased Summoning the Essence of Ancient Wisdom vinyl LP. This EP notably contained a cover of Key to The Gate by Norway's Burzum.

=== Debut album ===
2002 saw Astriaal headline Sydney's Bloodlust Festival along with supports for Mayhem and Destruction. This led to an increase in the bands profile. In July 2003 Renascent Misanthropy was released on Gryphon's Blacktalon Media label, with a distribution deal with MGM Distribution. The Album is notable for containing synthesizer and production work from Australian producer Lachlan Mitchell who is also a well known member of the Australian black metal scene due to his work in Nazxul.

The Album was later released by Aftermath Music [Norway] as a digi-pack containing different artwork and layout. In 2007 Obsidian Records [Australia] later did a revised slipcase edition with different artwork. layout and live video and a photo gallery. In 2012 Art of Propaganda released the LP/Vinyl edition limited to 300 copies.

=== Hiatus, second album ===
Following a couple of festival appearances, at the end of 2004 Astriaal announced an extended break. The band returned to perform at Brisbane's Overcranked festival in April 2006, and followed up with a high-profile support of Arcturus in early 2007. Bassist Murtach left the band on completion of the tour.

The band recorded a follow-up to Renascent Misanthropy in Australia during 2009 entitled Anatomy of the Infinite The band performed the album mixing in Mølla Lydstudios, Norway with Knut Magne Valle of Arcturus. The album was released July 2010, with the band later in 2010 supporting Mayhem on a national tour.

== Discography ==
Studio albums

- Renascent Misanthropy CD/LP (2003)
- Anatomy of the Infinite CD (2010)

EPs

- Summoning the Essence of Ancient Wisdom MCD (2000)
- Somnium Infinitus (Astriaal Archetype Anno MMI) MCD (2001)
- Deception Revelation MCD (2003)

Singles

- The Throne to Perish: An Icon of Disease 7"EP (2003)
- Ad Interim Promo CD (2009)

Demos

- Glories of the Nightsky Demo Cassette (1999)
- Summoning the Essence of Ancient Wisdom Promo CD (1999)

== Band members ==
Astriaal's various band members have been involved throughout Australia's heavy metal scene. Arzarkhel and Helthor provided Vocals and Bass guitar respectively for Netherkin, whilst Gryphon being a founding member performed drums in Carbon, and has performed with Atomizer and Urgrund in the past. Gryphon also ran the independent record label Blacktalon Media which released debuts from underground Australian artists such as Astriaal, Portal, Ruins and Excruciate amongst others. Murtach is the founding member of Carbon, writing and performing all guitars, vocals and lyrics and a respected sound engineer within the Brisbane and Australian live music scene. Baaruhl is now making a profile as a sound engineer, having recorded the debut album for Mongrel's Cross and now performing with them as a session live guitarist.

Daeimos is a founding member of Australian death metal legends Psychrist. He also played bass for Dehuman and currently with Infinitum also.

Current members

- Arzarkhel – Lead Vocals and Lyrics (1997 – present)
- Gryphon – Drums and Percussion (1997 – present)
- Baaruhl – Lead Guitar (1997 – present)
- Svarogg – Rhythm Guitar (2012 – present)
- Daeimos – Bass Guitar (2010 – present)

Former members

- Helthor – Rhythm Guitar (1997 – 2011)
- Murtach – Bass Guitar (1998 – 2007)
- Cameron Grant [Psycroptic] – Session Live Bass Guitar (2010)

== See also ==
- Australian heavy metal
- Metal for the Brain
