= Easy Love =

"Easy Love" may refer to:

- "Easy Love" (Dionne Warwick song), 1980
- "Easy Love" (Sigala song), 2015
- "Easy Love" (Lauv song), 2017
- "Easy Love", a song by R5 on the 2014 EP Heart Made Up on You
- "Easy Love", a 2019 song by Blair St. Clair
- "Easy Love", a 2015 song by James Morrison from Higher Than Here
- "Easy Love", the first opening theme of Don't Toy with Me, Miss Nagatoro

== See also ==
- Easy Lover (disambiguation)
- Easy to Love (disambiguation)
