= Anatomy of the Infinite =

Studio album by Astriaal
- Released: July 23, 2010
- Genre: Black metal
- Length: 34:44
- Label: Obsidian Records

Astriaal chronology
Renascent Misanthropy (2003)	Anatomy of the Infinite (2010)

Professional ratings
Review scores
Source	Rating
Metalforge	8/10 stars

Anatomy of the Infinite is the second album from Australian black metal band Astriaal.

== Track listing ==
All tracks are written by Astriaal

No.	Title	Length
1.	"Blessed Are the Dead"	2:28
2.	"Visceral Incarnate"	5:39
3.	"'Neath the Bones of Salvation"	3:43
4.	"Ad Interim"	1:29
5.	"The Scars of Aberration"	6:23
6.	"Foundations in Flesh"	5:28
7.	"Relinquishment of the Stars (instrumental)"	3:25
8.	"For the Day Will Come"	6:29
Total length:		34:44

== Personnel ==
- Arzarkhel – Vocals
- Gryphon - Drums
- Baaruhl - Guitars, bass
- Helthor – Guitars, bass
