= Easy Lover (disambiguation) =

"Easy Lover" is a 1984 song performed by Philip Bailey and Phil Collins.

Easy Lover may also refer to:

- "Easy Lover" (Ellie Goulding song), 2022
- "Easy Lover" (Miley Cyrus song), 2025

== See also ==
- Easy Love (disambiguation)
