= The Brink (The Jezabels album) =

2014 studio album by the Jezabels

Studio album by The Jezabels
- Released: 31 January 2014
- Studio: London
- Genres: Indie rock; alternative rock
- Length: 44:23
- Labels: PIAS; Dine Alone
- Producer: Dan Grech-Marguerat

The Jezabels chronology
Prisoner (2011)	The Brink (2014)	Synthia (2016)

Singles from The Brink
- 1. "The End" Released: October 14, 2013; 2. "Look of Love" Released: February 17, 2014; 3. "Time to Dance" Released: July 27, 2014

Professional ratings
Aggregate scores
Source	Rating
Metacritic	56/100
Review scores
Source	Rating
AllMusic	4/5 stars
Drowned in Sound	4/10
The Guardian	3/5 stars
The Line of Best Fit	6/10
musicOMH	2.5/5 stars
The Observer	2/5 stars
PopMatters	5/10
Sputnikmusic	3.5/5 stars

The Brink is the second studio album by Australian indie rock band The Jezabels. It was self-released on 31 January 2014 and internationally, through PIAS Recordings and Dine Alone Records. The album was recorded in London with producer Dan Grech-Marguerat. Lead single "The End" was released on 18 October 2013, with its music video uploaded on the group's official YouTube channel on 14 November. The track reached number 81 on the Australian ARIA Singles Chart. The album debuted at number 2 on the Australian ARIA Albums Chart. It received generally mixed reviews from critics.

Prior to the release of the album, the group made a webisode series documenting the recording process. On the differences between their first and second albums, Hayley Mary told news.com.au: "We were facing the second album thing which is a cliche but it's straight-up true. The second album is hard. Working with a new producer, new label involved, away from our families and Dave our manager, it was different. But lyrically, the album is more a year in the life of (me as) a person because I have always pretended things were not about me in the lyrics. This one is personal."

== Track listing ==
All tracks written by Hayley Mary, Heather Shannon, Sam Lockwood, and Nik Kaloper.

The Brink track listing
No.	Title	Length
1.	"The Brink"	4:46
2.	"Time to Dance"	4:38
3.	"Look of Love"	4:01
4.	"Beat to Beat"	4:16
5.	"Angels of Fire"	4:02
6.	"No Country"	4:33
7.	"The End"	4:00
8.	"Got Velvet"	4:26
9.	"Psychotherapy"	4:44
10.	"All You Need"	4:58
11.	"Marianne" (bonus track)	3:48

== Personnel ==
- Christopher Doyle – art direction, design
- Duncan Fuller – engineer
- Dan Grech-Marguerat – engineer, mixing, producer, programming
- The Jezabels – composer, primary artist
- Nik Kaloper – group member
- Samuel Lockwood – group member
- Hayley Mary – group member
- Lachlan Mitchell – pre-production
- Jarek Puczel – artwork
- Heather Shannon – group member
- Christian Wright – mastering

== Charts ==
Chart performance for The Brink
Chart (2014)	Peak position
Australian Albums (ARIA)	2
German Albums (Offizielle Top 100)	79
