= Renascent Misanthropy =

Studio album by Astriaal
- Released: 1 July 2003
- Recorded: June 2002 at Sunshine Studios, Brisbane, Australia Vocals recorded August 2002 at Fresh Studios, Sydney, Australia
- Genre: Black metal
- Length: 40:18
- Label: Blacktalon Media, Aftermath Music, Obsidian Records
- Producer: Astriaal, Lachlan Mitchell

Astriaal chronology
Deception Revelation (2002)	Renascent Misanthropy (2003)	Anatomy of the Infinite (2010)

Professional ratings
Review scores
Source	Rating
Metalforge	9/10 stars

Renascent Misanthropy Is the debut album for Australian Black Metal band Astriaal.

== Background ==
Renascent Misanthropy contained a mix of new unreleased recordings, and some new recordings of songs previously found on various demo's and EP's. Lachlan Mitchell of Nazxul fame was hired as a producer and engineer for the album, as well as providing synthesizers for some of the album's tracks. Originally released in jewel case by Gryphon's Blacktalon Media Label, with various re-releases by Aftermath Music and Obsidian records. The latter included a CD-ROM featuring a live video of Arborescence and a photo gallery.

A vinyl pressing was released in June 2012 by Art of Propaganda and limited to 300 copies.

== Track listing ==
All tracks are written by Astriaal

No.	Title	Length
1.	"The Funeral Procession (Intro)"	01:20
2.	"Ritual Hate Construct"	03:39
3.	"Revere the Labyrinth"	03:57
4.	"Glories of the Nightsky"	07:08
5.	"Ode to Antiquity"	04:17
6.	"Arborescence"	06:35
7.	"Acquisition of the Stars (instrumental)"	04:19
8.	"Reaper of Dark Ages"	06:26
9.	"The Halls of Perdition (Outro)"	02:37
Total length:		40:18

Note: The Funeral Procession Performed by Tharen .
Note: The Halls of Perdition Performed by Arzarkhel .

== Personnel ==
- Arzarkhel – All vocals and lyrics
- Gryphon - Drums and percussion
- Baaruhl - lead, Rhythm and Acoustic guitars
- Murtach – bass guitar

=== Addition personnel ===
- Helthor - Co arrangement and Composition
- Lachlan Mitchell - Synthesizers
