= The Man Is Dead =

The Man Is Dead EP

EP by The Jezabels
- Released: 3 February 2009
- Genre: Indie pop, indie rock, rock
- Length: 20:21
- Label: Independent

The Jezabels chronology
The Man Is Dead EP (2009)	She's So Hard EP (2009)

The Man Is Dead is the first EP recorded and released by Australian four-piece musical group The Jezabels. It was released independently on 3 February 2009 through MGM Distribution.

== Track listing ==
All tracks written by Hayley Mary, Heather Shannon, Sam Lockwood, and Nik Kaloper

No.	Title	Length
1.	"Disco Biscuit Love"	4:22
2.	"Be A Star"	4:11
3.	"Electric Lover"	3:42
4.	"Old Little Girls"	3:24
5.	"Unmarked Helicopters"	4:42
