= LW3 (classification) =

Paralympic skiing classification

LW3 is a Para alpine and Para Nordic standing skiing sport class defined by the International Paralympic Committee (IPC) for skiers with a disability affecting both legs, with double below knee amputation or a combined strength total for both legs of 60, with 80 as the baseline for people without disabilities. For international skiing competitions, classification is done through IPC Alpine Skiing or IPC Nordic Skiing. The classification has two subclasses for para-alpine skiing: LW3.1 which is for people with double below the knee amputations or similar disabilities, and LW3.2 which is for people with cerebral palsy that involves moderate athetoid, moderate ataxic impairment or slight diplegic involvement.

Skiers in this classification compete with two skis and two ski poles in both para-alpine and para-Nordic skiing. In training, they may use different types of equipment depending on the type of disability the skier has. As this class includes skiers with paralysis, amputations and cerebral palsy, a variety of skiing techniques and training types are needed. For skiers with balance issues, ski bras are used to learn how to balance on skis.

A factoring system is used in the sport to allow different sport classes to compete against each other when there are too few individual competitors in one class in a competition. The factoring for LW3 alpine skiing classification during the 2011/2012 skiing season was 0.8929 for slalom, 0.9157 for giant slalom, 0.9307 for super-G and 0.9429 for downhill. In para-Nordic skiing, the percentage for the 2012/2013 ski season was 87-94% for classic and 80-96% for free. This class has been able to compete at the Paralympic Games and World Championships dating back to at least the 1990s. Skiers in this class include Australian Marty Mayberry and Canadian LW3.1 skier Lauren Woolstencroft.

== Definition ==
LW3 is as para-alpine and para-Nordic standing skiing classification, where LW stands for Locomotor Winter. Competitors in this class have a disability affecting both legs, with double below knee amputation or a combined strength total for both of 60, with 80 as the baseline for people without disabilities. For para-alpine skiing, the International Paralympic Committee (IPC) explicitly defines this sport class as "Competitors with disabilities in both lower limbs, and skiing with two normal skis and two poles or stabilizers ... Typical disability profile of the class is double below-knee amputations." The Australian Paralympic Committee summarized this classification in 2002 as a standing skiing classification with "Two skis, two poles, disability in both legs below the knees." For para-Nordic skiing, the IPC defines this classification as "those with impairment in two lower limbs, which includes whole and/or partial limb dysfunction." Cross Country Canada summarized this classification as "Impairment in two lower limbs which include whole and or partial limb dysfunction." A skier may be able to stand and jump on one leg depending on the nature of their disability.

For international para-alpine skiing competitions, classification is done through IPC Alpine Skiing. A national federation such as Alpine Canada handles classification for domestic competitions. For para-Nordic skiing events, classification is handled by IPC Nordic Skiing Technical Committee on the international level and by the national sports federation such as Cross-Country Canada on a country by country level. When being assessed into this sport class, a number of things are considered including reviewing the skiers medical history and medical information on the skier's disability, having a physical and an in person assessment of the skier training or competing.

=== LW3.1 ===
LW3.1 is a para-alpine skiing subclass for people with double below the knee amputations or similar disabilities. It is defined by the IPC as "a. Double below-knee amputation, minimal through the ankle joint. b. disabilities of both lower limbs with a maximum of 60 muscle points (normal 80), i.e., those competitors who are able to edge skis belong to class 3.2."

=== LW3.2 ===
LW3.2 is a subclass for people with cerebral palsy that involves moderate athetoid, moderate ataxic impairment or slight diplegic involvement. The IPC defines this class for para-alpine skiing as "a. CP5: moderate-to-slight diplegic involvement b. CP6: moderate athetoid or ataxic impairment".

== Equipment ==
Skiers in this classification compete with two skis and two ski poles in both para-alpine and para-Nordic skiing. During training, skiers may use prosthesis, cants, wedges, ski-bras, outriggers or short skis. For skiers using a prosthesis, a special skiing prosthesis is used and they may also require the user of outriggers. The nature of their disability will dictate the type of equipment required. Ski bras are devices clamped to the tips of skis, which result in the skis being attached to each other. Outriggers are forearm crutches with a miniature ski on a rocker at the base. Cants are wedges that sit under the binding that are intended to more evenly distribute weight. They are customised for the specific needs of the skier. The ski boot for below the knee amputees often has the prosthetic built into it, though for all competitors in this class, FIS rules for para-alpine ski boots and binding heights are modified for this class from rules applied to able bodied competitor's equipment. In the Biathlon, athletes with amputations can use a rifle support while shooting.

== Technique ==
As this class includes skiers with paralysis, amputations and cerebral palsy, a variety of skiing techniques and training types are needed. Skiers in this classification who have paralysis as a result of hemiplegia, stroke or polio tend to initially favour a strong side of their body when they learn to ski, which sometimes results in overskiing. Ski-bras and bungie cords are used in training to correct this. If this is not corrected, skiers are likely to fall over when their skis cross in front of them. Skiers with below the knee amputations get on and off the ski lift using the same technique as able-bodied skiers.

In this classification, skiers with cerebral palsy have difficulty walking in ski boots and sometimes require assistance when walking in them. When going up hill, they often have their weaker side on the uphill side. In learning to ski, a ski bra is often used to teach the proper technique. Skiers sometimes have difficulty with the snowplough technique. In teaching skiers with cerebral palsy, instructors are encouraged to delay the introduction ski poles as skiers may overgrip them. Use of a ski bra is also encourage as it helps the skier learn correct knee and hip placement. Some skiers with cerebral palsy have better balance while using skis than they would otherwise. This presents challenges for coaches who are working with the skier. Compared to other skiers in the class, the skier with cerebral palsy may tie more quickly.

One method of learning to ski for LW3 competitors with cerebral palsy is the American Teaching System. They first thing skiers learn is what their equipment is, and how to put it on and take it off. Next, skiers learn about positioning their body in a standing position on flat terrain. After this, the skier learns how to side step, and then how to fall down and get back up again. The skier then learns how to do a straight run, and then is taught how to get on and off the chair lift. This is followed by learning wedge turns and weight transfers, wedge turns, wide track parallel turns, how to use ski poles, and advanced parallel turns.

In the Biathlon, all Paralympic athletes shoot from a prone position.

== Sport ==
A factoring system is used in the sport to allow different classes to compete against each other when there are too few individual competitors in one class in a competition. The factoring system works by having a number for each class based on their functional mobility or vision levels, where the results are calculated by multiplying the finish time by the factored number. The resulting number is the one used to determine the winner in events where the factor system is used. For the 2003/2004 para-Nordic skiing season, the percentage for the classic technique was 87% and percentage for free was 80-91%. The factoring for LW3 alpine skiing classification during the 2011/2012 skiing season was 0.8929 for Slalom, 0.9157 for Giant Slalom, 0.9307 for Super-G and 0.9429 for downhill. In para-Nordic skiing, the percentage for the 2012/2013 ski season was 87-94% for classic and 80-96% for free.

In para-alpine-skiing events, LW3 is grouped with standing classes who are seeded to start after visually impaired classes and before sitting classes in the slalom and giant slalom. In downhill, Super-G and Super Combined, this same group competes after the visually impaired classes and sitting classes. For alpine events, a skier is required to have their ski poles or equivalent equipment planted in the snow in front of the starting position before the start of the race. In cross-country and biathlon events, this classification is grouped with other standing classes. The IPC advises event organisers to run the men's standing ski group after the blind men's group and before the blind women's group. Women's standing classes are advised to go last.

== Events ==
While LW3 was not grouped with others classes at an event in the 1980s, it was grouped with other classifications during the 1990s and 2000s. At the 1984 Winter Olympics Exhibition Competition, disciplines included on the programme were downhill and giant slalom. This classification was not grouped with others for medal events for men. At the 1992 Winter Paralympics, LW1 and LW3 were grouped together for men's medal events in para-alpine. At the 1994 Winter Paralympics, LW1 and LW3 were grouped together for men's medal events in para-alpine. At the 1996 Disabled Alpine World Championships, Lech, Austria, men's LW1, LW3 and LW5 were grouped together for medal events. At the 1998 Winter Paralympics, the women's LW1, LW3, LW4, LW5 and LW6 classes competed in one group, while LW1, LW3 and LW5 were grouped for men's medal events in para-alpine. At the 2002 Winter Paralympics in alpine-skiing, LW3, LW5/7 and LW9 were grouped for the men's downhill, Super-G, Slalom and Giant Slalom events, while women's LW3, LW4, LW6/8 and LW9 were grouped for the Super-G event and the women's LW3, LW4, and LW9 classes were grouped for the slalom and giant slalom events. At the 2005 IPC Nordic Skiing World Championships, this class was grouped with other standing skiing classifications. In cross country, this class was eligible to compete in the men and women's 5 km, 10 km and 20 km individual race. In the men and women's biathlon, this classification was again grouped with standing classes in the 7.4 km race with 2 shooting stages 12.5 km race which had four shooting stages. At the 2009 World Championships, there were two men and two women from this class the standing downhill event.

== Competitors ==
Skiers in this class include Australian Marty Mayberry, and Canadian LW3.1 skier Lauren Woolstencroft.
