= Hayley Mary =

Australian singer (born 1987)

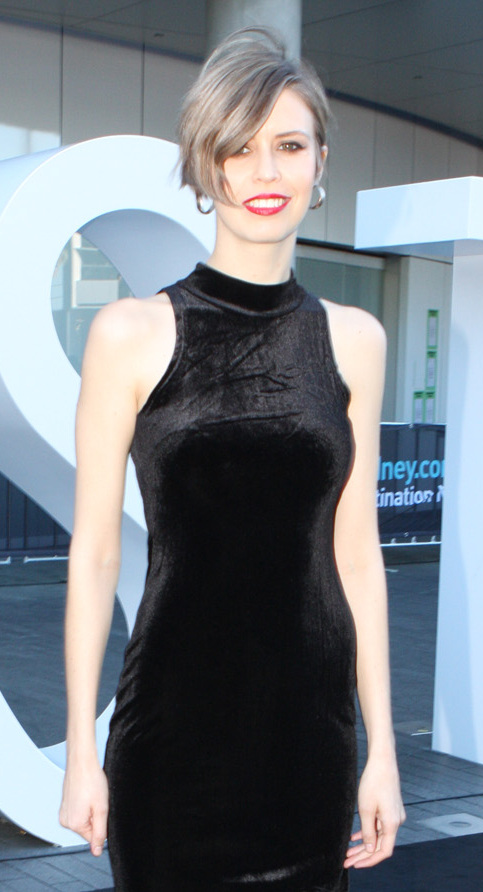
- Mary in 2013

Background information
- Born: 21 May 1987 (age 39)
- Genres: Indie rock; indie pop; alternative rock
- Occupations: Singer; songwriter
- Years active: 2007–present
- Label: I OH YOU
- Member of: The Jezabels

Hayley Mary (born 21 May 1987) is an Australian singer, best known as the lead singer of the indie rock band the Jezabels. She began releasing solo material in 2020.

== Early life ==
Hayley Mary grew up in Byron Bay. She went to school with Heather Shannon, with whom she would form The Jezabels. The two relocated to Sydney to attend university, where they met Nik Kaloper and Sam Lockwood, and formed the band in 2007.

== Career ==
=== 2007–2017: The Jezabels ===
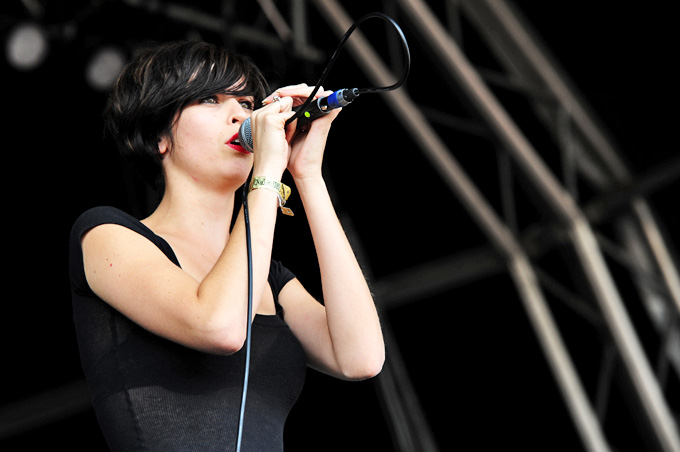
Mary performing with The Jezabels in 2012

The Jezabels were formed in 2007 when the four members met as students at the University of Sydney. Over the next years, they released three EPs as well as three studio albums that peaked within the ARIA top 5. The band won an ARIA Music Award, an Australian Music Prize and three Australian Independent Record Awards.

The band have been on unofficial hiatus since December 2017.

=== 2018–present: Solo career ===
On 14 October 2019, Mary released her debut solo single, "The Piss, The Perfume". This was followed by "Ordinary Me" in December 2019. On 8 January 2020, "Like a Woman Should" was released, all from Mary's debut EP, The Piss, The Perfume, on 17 January 2020.

In May 2021, Mary released "Young & Stupid" and announced her second EP, The Drip, released on 18 June 2021.

On 26 November 2021, Mary surprise-released her third EP, titled Fall in Love.

In July 2024, Mary announced the release of her debut studio album, Roman XS. The album is preceded by the singles "One Last Drag", "The Ballad of Ruby Wednesday" and "The Lonely One".

In November 2024, she posted a picture of herself wearing a MAGA cap and in her own words "cancelled herself". However, she is still continuing to write and put out new music "when the muses pester [her] to do so."

== Discography ==
=== Studio albums ===
List of albums, with release date and label shown
Title	Details
Roman XS	Scheduled: 25 October 2024; Label: Formats: CD, digital download, LP, streaming

=== EPs ===
List of EPs, with release date and label shown
Title	Details
The Piss, the Perfume	Released: 17 January 2020; Label: I OH YOU (IOU400); Formats: CD, digital download, LP, streaming
The Drip	Released: 18 June 2021; Label: I OH YOU; Formats: CD, digital download, LP, streaming
Fall in Love	Released: 26 November 2021; Label: Hayley Mary; Formats: digital download, streaming

=== Singles ===
Title	Year	Album
"The Piss, the Perfume"	2019	The Piss, the Perfume
"Ordinary Me"	2019	The Piss, the Perfume
"Like a Woman Should"	2020	The Piss, the Perfume
"The Chain"	2020	The Drip
"Would You Throw a Diamond?"	2021	The Drip
"Young & Stupid"	2021	The Drip
"The Drip"	2021	The Drip
"Sullen Kink"	2021	The Drip
"Fall in Love"	2021	Fall in Love
"Only Feel It When I'm with You" (Baby Strange) featuring Hayley Mary)	2022	World Below
"Deadly Heart" (Scott Darlow) featuring Hayley Mary)	2023	Deadly Heart
"One Last Drag"	2024	Roman XS
"The Ballad of Ruby Wednesday"	2024	Roman XS
"The Lonely One"	2024	Roman XS
"Eighteen"	2024	Roman XS

== Awards and nominations ==
=== AIR Awards ===
The Australian Independent Record Awards (known colloquially as the AIR Awards) is an annual awards night to recognise, promote and celebrate the success of Australia's Independent Music sector.

Year	Nominee / work	Award	Result	Ref.
2021	Herself	Breakthrough Independent Artist of the Year	Nominated	
2022	The Drip	Best Independent Rock Album or EP	Nominated	

=== APRA Awards ===
The APRA Awards are presented annually from 1982 by the Australasian Performing Right Association (APRA), "honouring composers and songwriters".

Year	Nominee / work	Award	Result	Ref.
2011	Hayley McGlone (with Nikolas Kaloper, Samuel Lockwood, Heather Shannon)	Breakthrough Songwriter of the Year	Nominated	

=== Australian Music Prize ===
The Soundmerch Australian Music Prize (AMP), awarded annually since 2005, "exists to discover, reward and promote new Australian music of excellence."

Year	Nominee / work	Award	Result	Ref.
2025	Hayley McGlone (for Roman XS)	Best Album of the Year	Nominated	
