= Prisoner (The Jezabels album) =

2011 studio album by the Jezabels

Studio album by The Jezabels
- Released: 16 September 2011
- Recorded: Attic Studios, Sydney
- Genre: Indie rock, alternative rock
- Length: 55:08
- Label: PIAS, Mom + Pop, Dine Alone
- Producer: Lachlan Mitchell

The Jezabels chronology
Dark Storm EP (2010)	Prisoner (2011)	The Brink (2014)

Singles from Prisoner
- 1. "Endless Summer" Released: 16 September 2011; 2. "Trycolour" Released: 12 December 2011; 3. "Rosebud" Released: 6 February 2012; 4. "City Girl" Released: 4 April 2012

Prisoner is the debut studio album by Australian indie rock band The Jezabels. It was self-released on 16 September 2011 and internationally through PIAS Recordings, Mom + Pop Music and Dine Alone Records. It was recorded at Sydney's Attic Studios with producer Lachlan Mitchell and mixed by Peter Katis. Prisoner was news.com.au Entertainment's album of the week during the week of its release. The album won the 2011 Australian Music Prize and was described as "a cocktail of power and elegance, rising like a force to be reckoned with. Dramatic, creative songwriting is delivered with ferocity by commanding front woman Hayley Mary. The Jezabels have firmly cemented their place in the Australian music industry and abroad."

At the J Awards of 2011, the album was nominated for Australian Album of the Year.

The album won Album of the Year at the 2012 Rolling Stone Australia Awards.

== Track listing ==
All tracks written by Hayley Mary, Heather Shannon, Sam Lockwood, and Nik Kaloper

No.	Title	Length
1.	"Prisoner"	4:13
2.	"Endless Summer"	4:12
3.	"Long Highway"	6:02
4.	"Trycolour"	5:14
5.	"Rosebud"	4:16
6.	"City Girl"	5:24
7.	"Nobody Nowhere"	2:45
8.	"Horsehead"	4:30
9.	"Austerlitz"	3:04
10.	"Deep Wide Ocean"	4:45
11.	"Peace of Mind"	4:01
12.	"Reprise"	0:57
13.	"Catch Me"	5:45

iTunes Bonus Tracks
No.	Title	Length
14.	"Hurt Me"	5:48
15.	"Easy to Love"	4:51

== Charts ==
=== Weekly charts ===
Chart (2011)	Peak position
Australian Albums (ARIA)	2
German Albums (Offizielle Top 100)	67
Swiss Albums (Schweizer Hitparade)	87
UK Independent Albums (OCC)	42

=== Year-end charts ===
Chart (2011)	Position
Australian Albums (ARIA)	72

== Certifications ==
Region	Certification	Certified units/sales
Australia (ARIA)	Gold	35,000^{^}
^{^} Shipments figures based on certification alone.
