= She's So Hard =

She's So Hard EP

EP by The Jezabels
- Released: 6 November 2009
- Genre: Indie pop, indie rock, rock
- Length: 25:23
- Label: Independent

The Jezabels chronology
The Man Is Dead (2009)	She's So Hard EP (2009)	Dark Storm (2010)

She's So Hard is the second EP recorded and released by Australian four-piece musical group The Jezabels. It was released independently on 6 November 2009 through MGM Distribution.

The single "Easy To Love" came in at number 49 in the Triple J Hottest 100, 2010.

== Track listing ==
All tracks written by Hayley Mary, Heather Shannon, Sam Lockwood, and Nik Kaloper

No.	Title	Length
1.	"Hurt Me"	5:46
2.	"Easy To Love"	4:50
3.	"Violent Dream"	5:00
4.	"Into The Ink"	6:25
5.	"The Man Is Dead"	3:22
