= The Jezabels =

Australian rock band

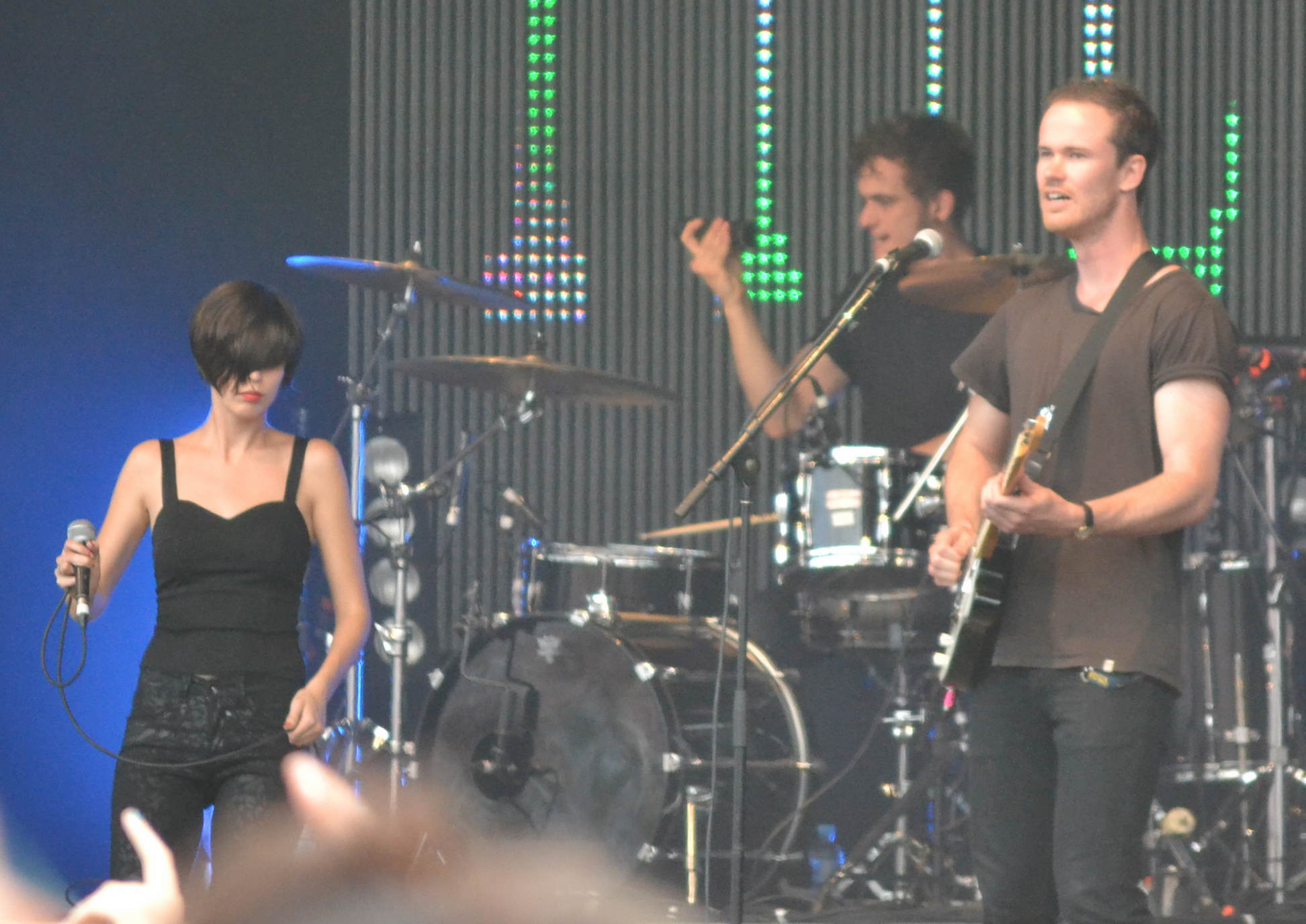
- The Jezabels performing in 2012; L–R: Hayley Mary, Nik Kaloper, Sam Lockwood; Heather Shannon is out of shot.

Background information
- Origin: Sydney, New South Wales, Australia
- Genres: Indie rock; alternative rock
- Years active: 2007–2017; 2022–2024
- Labels: PIAS; MGM Distribution; Dine Alone; Waterfront; Mom + Pop
- Members: Hayley Mary; Nikolas Stephan Kaloper; Samuel Henry Lockwood; Heather Gail Shannon
- Website: thejezabels.com

The Jezabels are an Australian indie rock band formed in Sydney in 2007. It consists of lead vocalist Hayley Mary, guitarist Sam Lockwood, pianist and keyboardist Heather Shannon, and drummer and percussionist Nik Kaloper.

From 2009 to 2010, the group released three EPs, The Man Is Dead, She's So Hard, and Dark Storm—all produced and engineered by Lachlan Mitchell. Two of their releases have reached the ARIA Singles Chart Top 40: the Dark Storm EP (October 2010) and the single "Endless Summer" (August 2011). They released their debut studio album, Prisoner, in September 2011. It peaked at No. 2 on the ARIA Albums Chart and won Best Independent Release at the ARIA Music Awards of 2012. Their second album, The Brink, came out in January 2014. Synthia, their third record, was issued in February 2016.

The band went on indefinite hiatus in December 2017 and reunited for a concert tour in 2022.

== History ==
=== Formation and EP trilogy: 2007–2010 ===
The Jezabels formed in 2007 after the four members met as students at the University of Sydney. Their music was described by the national radio station Triple J as a blend of alternative and indie rock. The band's Facebook page describes their genre as "intensindie". Their name is based on the biblical character Jezebel, whom Mary perceived as being "misunderstood or misrepresented". Hayley Mary and Heather Shannon both went to Byron Bay High School and had performed together as a folk duo in Byron Bay. Samuel Lockwood grew up in Bangalow and attended the same school. Lockwood recognised Mary and Shannon when he saw them at university and invited them to join a band for a competition. Mary recalled: "It was a combination of four individual desires to play music and taking whatever opportunities we could find – which happened to be each other ... From there the process has pretty much been one of reconciling musical differences. But we're getting closer".

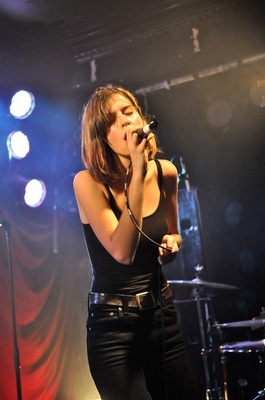
Hayley Mary performing with the Jezabels in 2009

On 3 February 2009, the Jezabels' debut EP, The Man Is Dead, was released independently via MGM Distribution. It was recorded at Megaphon & Production Ave Studios and produced by the Jezabels and Lachlan Mitchell. On 6 November of that year, the band followed with a second EP, She's So Hard, which included the tracks "Easy to Love" and "Hurt Me". Both EPs received significant radio airplay, including on Sydney's FBi Radio and Triple J. They also received airplay in the US, where in August, "Disco Biscuit Love" reached No. 96 on CMJ. On 22 December, the Jezabels were the Triple J Unearthed featured artist, described as "[d]ramatic, energetic, uplifting, indie rock with a commanding lead singer. We've picked them to play Field Day – a great way to start the new year!" She's So Hard was the No. 3 most added on US college radio for 2009.

On 1 October 2010, the Jezabels released the third EP, Dark Storm, which peaked in the top 40 on the ARIA Singles Chart. The Age's Peter Vincent felt "[t]heirs is a timeless sound that is radio-friendly: moody female vocals soaring over strong percussion and slow-building guitar and piano/keyboard lines".

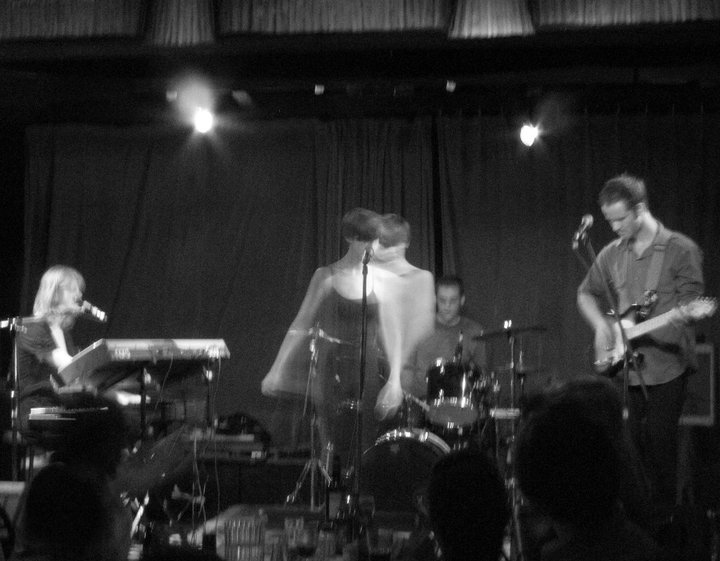
The Jezabels performing in Katoomba, 2010

=== Debut album: 2011–2013 ===
In August 2011, the Jezabels released a new single, "Endless Summer", which peaked in the top 40 of the ARIA Singles Chart.

On 16 September 2011, they published their debut studio album, Prisoner, which reached No. 2 on the ARIA Album Chart. It was recorded at Sydney's Attic Studios, with Mitchell producing and Peter Katis mixing. Vulture's Anna Moull described it in a review: "a dramatic gothic epic, with a twist of 80's power-house rock. Jezabels singer Hayley Mary sums up their sound perfectly as 'Bronte-esque gothic (and) melodramatic'. Channelling Kate Bush, Freddie Mercury and Cyndi Lauper, Mary's vocals are a force to be reckoned with". The website gave Prisoner 7 out of 10 points. By 31 December 2011, the album was certified gold by ARIA for the sale of 35,000 units. It received 3 out of 5 points by Guardian critic Caroline Sullivan and 7/10 by Dom Gourlay for drownedinsound.com.

=== The Brink, Synthia, and hiatus: 2013–2017 ===
In late 2013, the Jezabels released a song titled "The End" as the first single from their second album, The Brink, which came out on 31 January 2014.

Synthia, their third album, was released on 12 February 2016. It was again produced by Lachlan Mitchell (in the Jungle Studios, Attic Studios, and Oceanic Studios in Sydney). Its title alludes to the many new synthesizers that Shannon had bought and to the name Cynthia, which is an allusion to a goddess by that name (bynames of Luna and Artemis), Cynthia Lennon, Cynthia Plaster Caster, and Cyndi Lauper, who is a role model for Mary, not only for her music, but also for her feminist attitude and her commitment to the rights of homosexual people.

Synthia, the band's third album, was published on 12 February 2016. Reviewing the record song for song, XS Noize's Sandra Blemster compared Mary to Kate Bush and Chrissie Hynde. She wrote: "On listening to Synthia, I feel like I've paid a visit to the cinema and watched a gripping, extraordinary film. You know when a film captures you that much and you come out, it's daylight and your eyes hurt from the sun? That's how this album felt. Intoxicating stuff: maybe it's a full moon". The Sydney Morning Herald's Jenny Valentish wrote, Synthia was "everything fans love the band for: volatile, provocative and intelligent."

The band entered a hiatus following the tour in support for Synthia. In October 2021, they announced their reunion, with a commemorative ten-year anniversary tour for Prisoner, starting in June 2022.

== Music videos ==
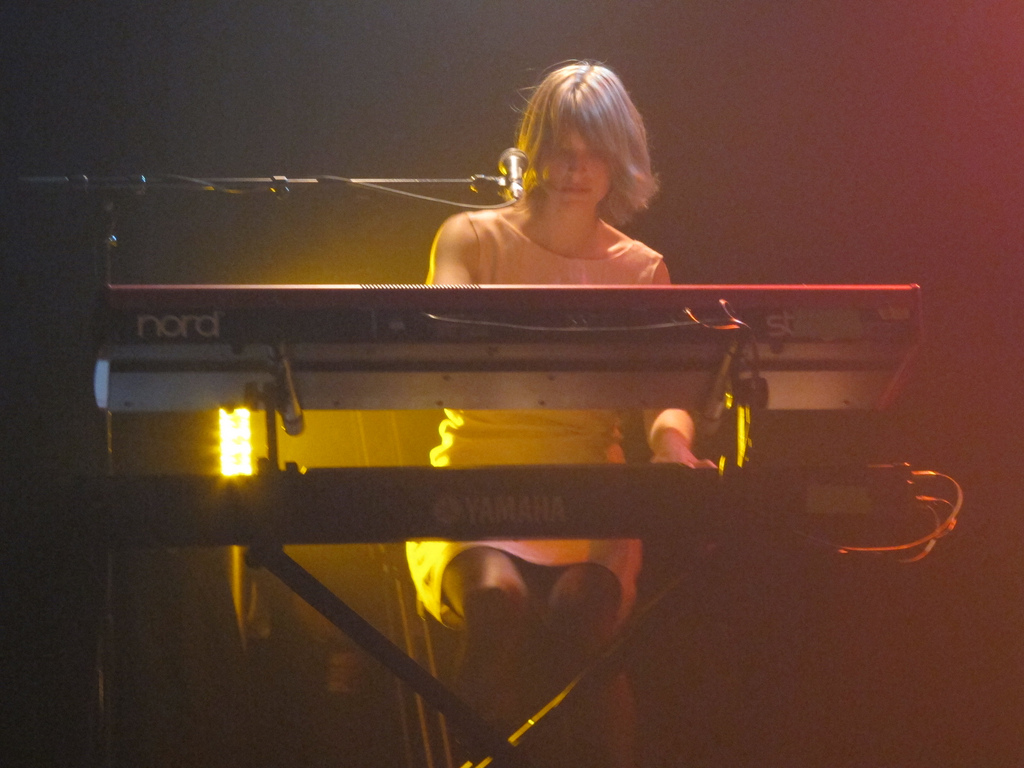
Heather Shannon on keyboards, April 2011

The Jezabels have released official music videos for the following tracks: "Disco Biscuit Love", "Hurt Me", "Easy to Love", "Mace Spray", "Trycolour", "Endless Summer", "City Girl", "Rosebud", "Angels of Fire", "Look of Love", "Time to Dance", "All You Need", "Come Alive", "Pleasure Drive", "My Love Is My Disease", "Smile", and "The Others". Two versions were made for "Disco Biscuit Love".

The "Hurt Me" clip was aired on Australian national television for a number of weeks in February 2010 by the Australian Broadcasting Corporation's music video program rage. It was also the rage Indie Clip of the Week in March 2010. "Easy to Love" was aired on rage in May 2010.

== Live performances ==
The Jezabels have stated that they are predominantly a live act, and they have played around Sydney since 2007. In November 2009, they did an east coast tour to launch She's So Hard. In November and December 2010, they undertook a national tour after launching Dark Storm.

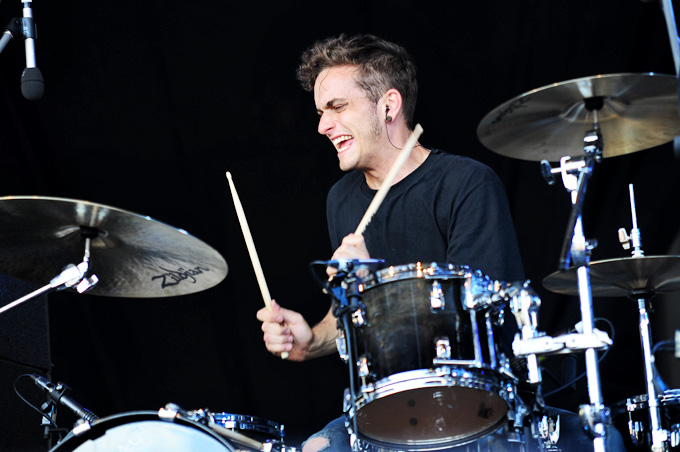
Nik Kaloper, Southbound Festival, Busselton, January 2012

The band has performed at the Australian festivals Big Day Out, Falls Festival, Pyramid Rock, Festival of the Sun, Playground Weekender, Come Together, Peats Ridge Festival, St Jerome's Laneway Festival, and Soundwave. In 2011, they played at Groovin' the Moo and Splendour in the Grass. In 2012, they were part of the de-Affaire festival in Nijmegen, Netherlands, and they also played at Melt! and Dockville in Germany and at Pukkelpop in Belgium.

The Jezabels supported Canada's Hey Rosetta! and Tegan and Sara on their Australian tours. In June 2010, they toured with Katie Noonan and the Captains and also supported Regurgitator, Bluejuice, Dukes of Windsor, Van She, Sparkadia, Ghostwood, Cassette Kids, Damn Arms, and Josh Pyke. In February 2012, Pyke performed a cover of "Endless Summer", featuring Elana Stone (the Rescue Ships), on Triple j's Like a Version. In April 2012, Big Scary covered "Hurt Me" for Like a Version. In 2014 and 2016, the Jezabels played two sessions on that show, covering Journey's "Don't Stop Believin'" and "If You Go" by Sticky Fingers, as well as playing their own songs "Look of Love" and "Pleasure Drive".

In October 2010, they played a 13-date tour of North America and Canada as the supporting act for Two Hours Traffic.

In August 2012, they performed at Lollapalooza in Grant Park, Chicago, and appeared at the Osheaga Festival in Montreal, Canada.

The band appeared as special guests on Depeche Mode's Delta Machine world tour in the UK and Ireland in November 2013.

The Jezabels had to cancel their 2016 world tour shortly before Synthia was released, as Shannon needed immediate treatment for an ovarian cancer that had been diagnosed three years before. In July 2016, the band announced that Shannon was "feeling strong again after her treatment" and that they would start touring again in September. Shannon had used the pause from tour life to collaborate with Midnight Oil's Peter Garrett on his solo debut, A Version of Now.

== Side projects ==
Hayley Mary appeared on the Birds of Tokyo track "Discoloured", from their 2016 album Brace. On 14 October 2019, she released her debut solo single, "The Piss, the Perfume". She has since issued three EPs, and her first full-length album is set to come out on 25 October 2024.

In early 2019, the ACO Collective commissioned Shannon with two classical pieces. "Ricochet" and "Ricochet from a Distance" were inspired by Joseph Haydn.

== In popular culture ==
In November 2011, "A Little Piece" was used in the Under Armour commercial "Are You from HERE?" that features basketball star Brandon Jennings. The song was also used in the 2010 Red Bull short film "Way Back Home", which features trials bike rider Danny MacAskill.

Australian pay TV provider Foxtel used "Endless Summer" as background music for their summer (2011–12) television content advertisement. "Nobody Nowhere" was used on the True Blood episode "In the Beginning", while "Easy to Love" appeared on the Grey's Anatomy episode "Hope for the Hopeless" in January 2012.

"Long Highway" was used in the 2014 Red Bull short film "Epecuén", again with Danny MacAskill.

== Band members ==
- Nikolas Stephan Kaloper – drums, percussion
- Samuel Henry Lockwood – guitars
- Hayley Mary – lead vocals
- Heather Gail Shannon – keyboards, piano

== Discography ==
=== Albums ===
List of albums, with selected chart positions and certifications
Title	Album details	Peak chart positions	Certifications
Title	Album details	AUS	Certifications
Prisoner	Released: 16 September 2011; Label: The Jezabels (JEZ-004) / Play It Again Sam; Format: Vinyl, CD, digital	2	ARIA: Gold
The Brink	Released: 31 January 2014; Label: The Jezabels (JEZ-005) / Play It Again Sam; Format: Vinyl, CD, digital	2	
Synthia	Released: 12 February 2016; Label: The Jezabels (JEZ-0056); Format: Vinyl, CD, digital	4	

=== EPs ===
Title	Album details	Peak chart positions	Certifications
Title	Album details	AUS	Certifications
The Man Is Dead	Released: February 2009; Label: The Jezabels (JEZ-001); Format: CD, digital	—	
She's So Hard	Released: November 2009; Label: The Jezabels (JEZ-002); Format: CD, digital	—	
Dark Storm	Released: October 2010; Label: The Jezabels (JEZ-003); Format: CD, digital	40	ARIA: Gold

=== Singles ===
List of singles, showing year released, album name, and selected chart positions and certifications
Single	Year	Peak chart positions		Certifications	Album
Single	Year	AUS	AUS Indie	Certifications	Album
"Endless Summer"	2011	39	—	ARIA: Gold	Prisoner
"Trycolour"	2011	—	—		Prisoner
"Rosebud"	2012	—	—		Prisoner
"City Girl"	2012	80	—		Prisoner
"The End"	2013	81	5		The Brink
"Look of Love"	2014	—	—		The Brink
"Angels of Fire"	2014	—	—		The Brink
"Time to Dance"	2014	—	—		The Brink
"All You Need"	2014	—	—		The Brink
"Come Alive"	2015	—	—		Synthia
"Pleasure Drive"	2016	—	—		Synthia
"The Others"	2017	—	—		Non-album single

== Awards and nominations ==
=== AIR Awards ===
The Australian Independent Record Awards (commonly known as AIR Awards) is an annual awards night to recognise, promote, and celebrate the success of Australia's independent music sector.

Year	Nominee / work	Award	Result
2010	Dark Storm	Best Independent Single/EP	Nominated
2010	themselves	Breakthrough Independent Artist of the Year	Nominated
2011	Dark Storm	Best Independent Single/EP	Won
2011	themselves	Independent Artist of the Year	Won
2012	Prisoner	Best Independent Album	Nominated
2012	themselves	Independent Artist of the Year	Won

=== APRA Awards ===
The APRA Awards have been presented annually since 1982 by the Australasian Performing Right Association, "honouring composers and songwriters".

Year	Nominee / work	Award	Result	Ref.
2011	Nikolas Kaloper, Samuel Lockwood, Hayley McGlone, Heather Shannon	Breakthrough Songwriter of the Year	Nominated	
2012	"Endless Summer"	Song of the Year	Shortlisted	
2015	"The End"	Rock Work of the Year	Nominated	

=== ARIA Awards ===
Year	Nominee / work	Award	Result
2011	Dark Storm	Single of the Year	Nominated
2011	Dark Storm	Breakthrough Artist – Single	Nominated
2011	Dark Storm	Best Independent Release	Nominated
2012	Prisoner	Album of the Year	Nominated
2012	Prisoner	Best Group	Nominated
2012	Prisoner	Best Independent Release	Won
2012	Prisoner	Best Rock Album	Nominated
2012	Prisoner album launch	Best Australian Live Act	Nominated
2012	Prisoner – Lachlan Mitchell	Producer of the Year	Nominated
2012	Prisoner – Lachlan Mitchell	Engineer of the Year	Nominated
2012	Prisoner – Christopher Doyle	Best Cover Art	Nominated

=== Australian Music Prize ===
The Australian Music Prize is an annual award of $30,000 given to an Australian band or solo artist in recognition of the merit of an album released during the year of award. The prize commenced in 2005.

Year	Nominee / work	Award	Result
2011	Prisoner	Australian Music Prize	Won

=== J Awards ===
The J Awards are an annual series of Australian music awards that were established by the Australian Broadcasting Corporation's youth-focused radio station Triple J. They commenced in 2005.

Year	Nominee / work	Award	Result
2010	themselves	Unearthed Artist of the Year	Nominated
2011	Prisoner	Australian Album of the Year	Nominated

=== National Live Music Awards ===
The National Live Music Awards are a broad recognition of Australia's live music industry. The awards commenced in 2016.

Year	Nominee / work	Award	Result
2017	Jezabels	Live Act of the Year	Nominated
