= Amanda Young Foundation =

Charity organization

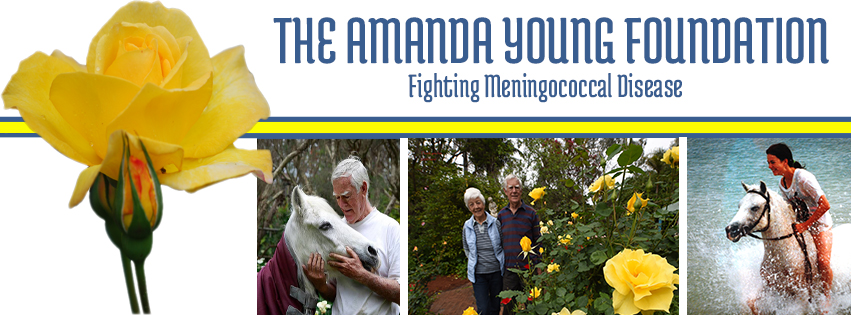
The Amanda Young Foundation

The Amanda Young Foundation was established in 1998 by Barry and Lorraine Young, following the death of their daughter Amanda in 1997 from meningococcal disease. Amanda had been attending a rowing regatta in Penrith, New South Wales where she contracted the disease.

== Amanda Young ==
Young was born on 6 September 1979, and died on 12 October 1997 after contracting meningococcal disease while in Penrith, New South Wales; she was part of a rowing team attending a regatta. The Australian University Rowing Championships had in 1997 been organised by the University of New South Wales. There had been an outbreak of meningococcal disease in the Kensington Colleges; 450 people who had come into contact with the infected person were given the vaccination, with some also being given antibiotics. Young was not amongst this group, as it was believed she had not come into contact. On 13 October, following Young's death, the NSW Health Department vaccinated everyone in the Kensington Colleges. A further 1100 students at Chevalier College were vaccinated after an outbreak there; one of the students infected had her feet amputated. The two events involved identical strains of the bacteria, but it was not known how they were related, and an early unrelated outbreak had occurred at the Kensington Colleges in August 1997.

== Foundation ==
The Amanda Young Foundation was established in 1998, with its purpose being:

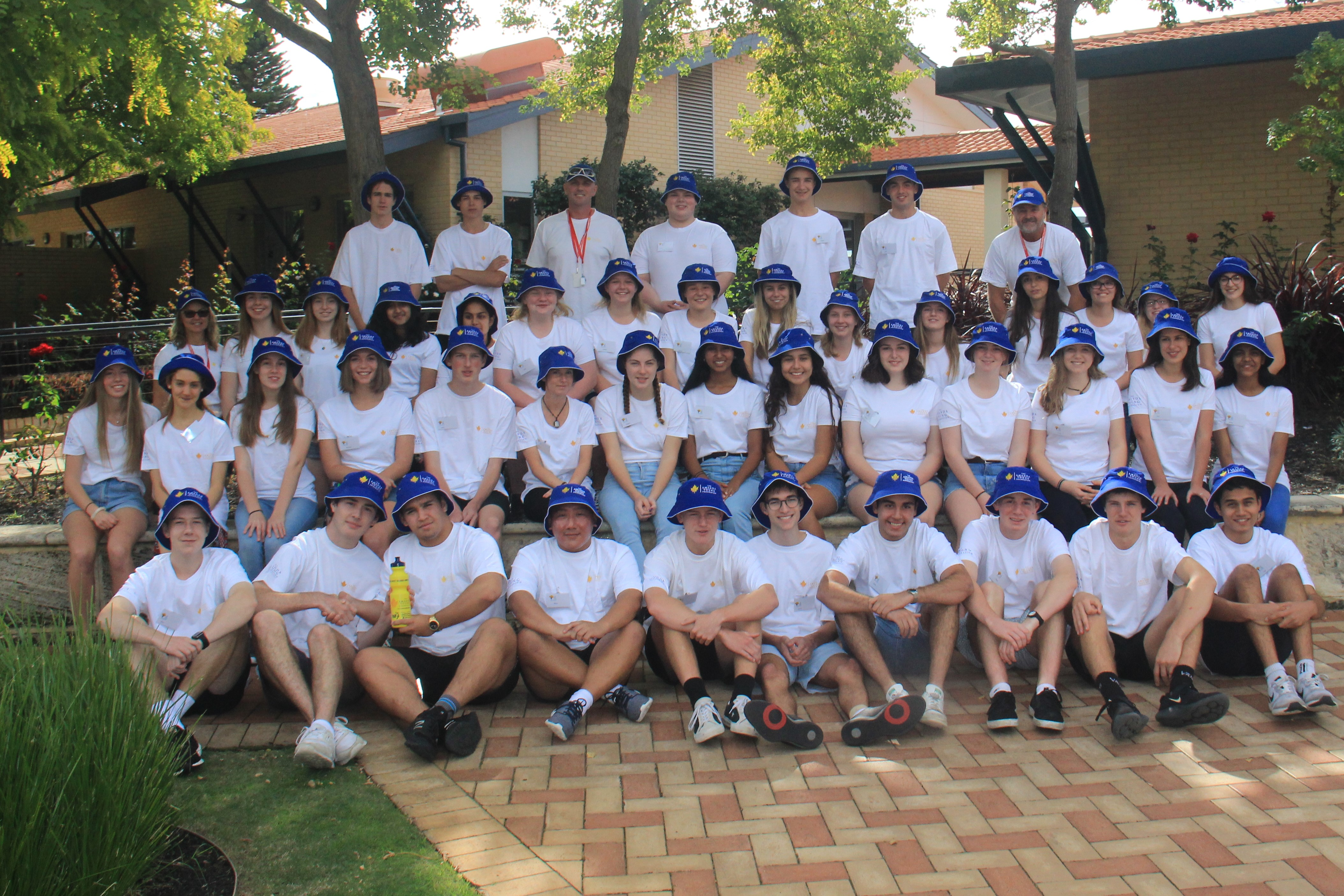
Group who attended the annual camp for year 11 students in Western Australia

To save and enhance lives through increased community education and awareness of meningococcal disease, to provide survivor support services and to encourage and support research that ultimately eliminates meningococcal disease.
To support and assist young people develop into leaders within the community.
To promote public health, raise awareness of meningococcal disease, support medical research, support meningococcal disease survivors and develop youth leaders

— Amanda Young Foundation

Kate Fandry – a friend of Amanda at Penrhos College, and a member of the same sporting teams – worked for the Foundation following support from the WA Health Department. Fandry's role is to promote the ACWY vaccination to teenagers and young adults. The Foundation relies on fundraising and the support of community groups across Perth to operate; they include open gardens, fetes, and other activities, such as the group of volunteers who in 2016 crocheted a wall of yellow flowers to be displayed during Channel Seven Perth Telethon.

== Amanda's Garden ==
Amanda's Garden is located in Southern River, Western Australia. The garden was created because Young's parents needed to do something to keep busy following her death.

There is an annual fete and open day, supported by local community groups, held every October to raise money for the Foundation.

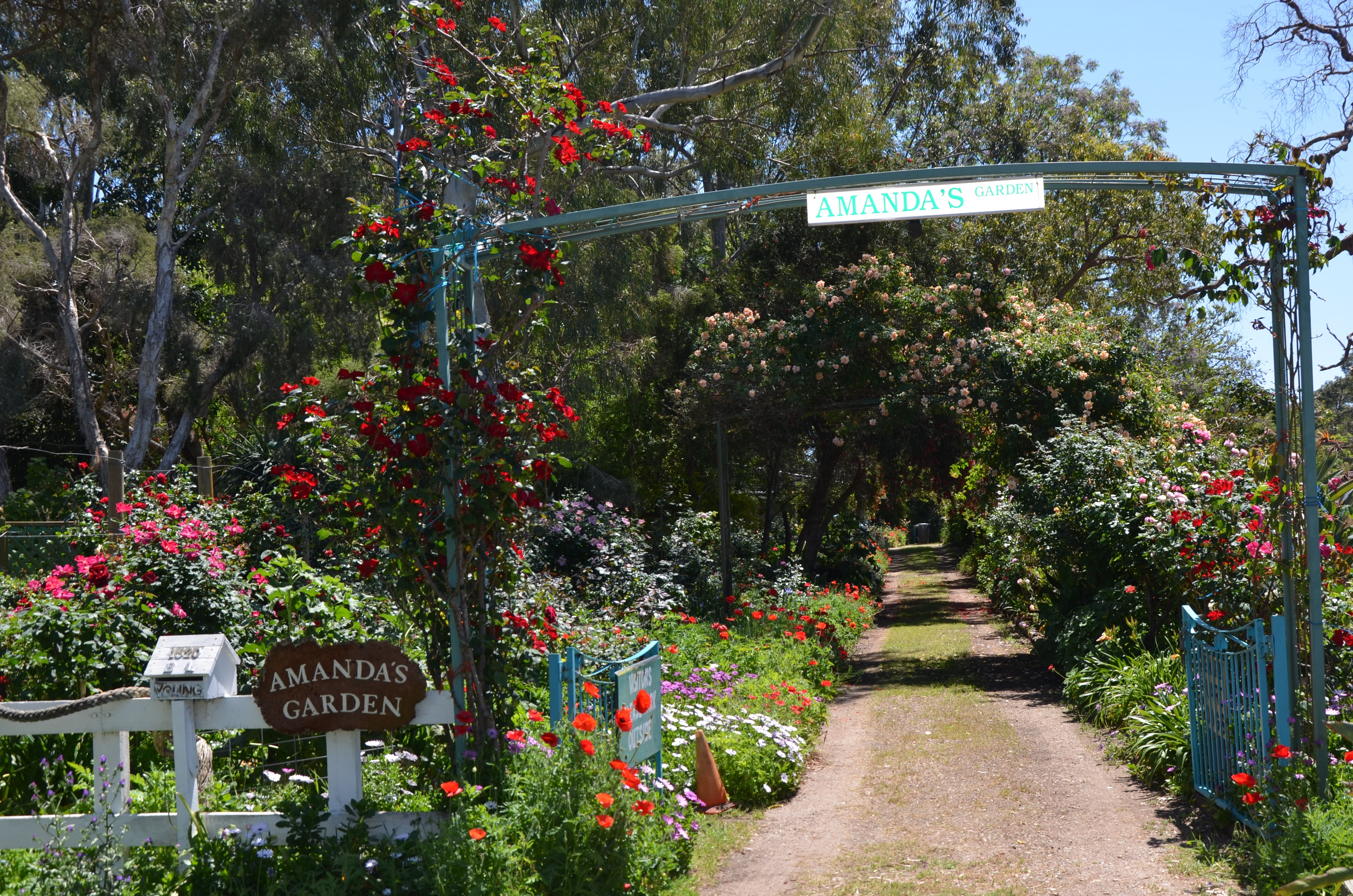
Entrance in Southern River

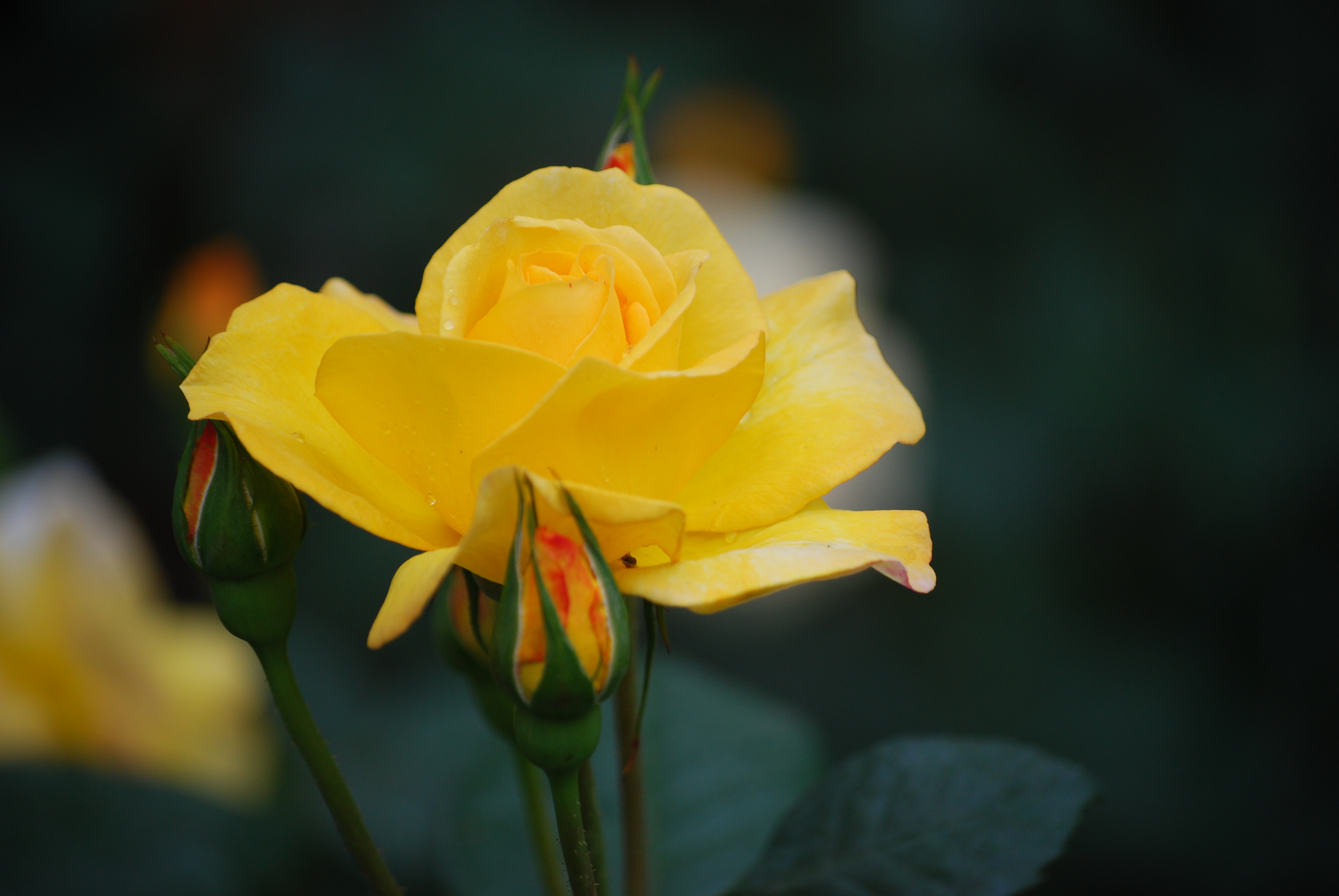
Amanda Rose

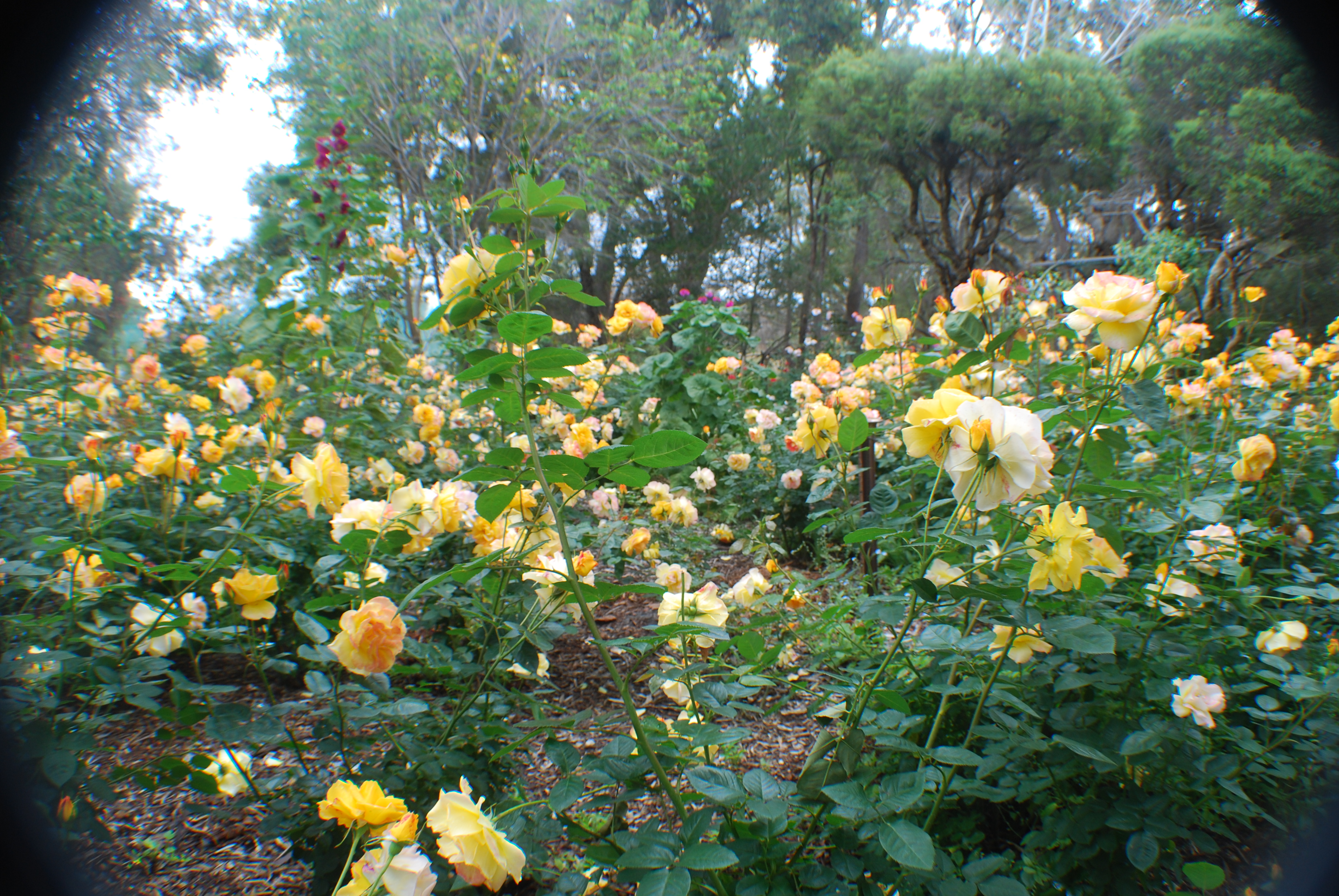
Mass display of the Amanda Rose
