= Dark Storm =

EP by The Jezabels
- Released: October 2010
- Genre: Indie rock
- Length: 23:50
- Label: Independent

The Jezabels chronology
She's So Hard (2009)	Dark Storm (2010)	Prisoner (2011)

Dark Storm is the third EP recorded and released by Australian four-piece musical group The Jezabels. It was released independently on 1 October 2010 ].

The EP debuted at number 40 on the ARIA Charts.

It received the Australian Independent Record (AIR) Award for 'Best Independent Single/EP' in 2011, with The Jezabels also taking away the 'Best Independent Artist' award the same year.

The single "Mace Spray" came in at number 16 in the Triple J Hottest 100, 2010.

== Track listing ==
All tracks written by Hayley Mary, Heather Shannon, Sam Lockwood, and Nik Kaloper

No.	Title	Length
1.	"Dark Storm"	4:52
2.	"Mace Spray"	5:07
3.	"Sahara Mahala"	5:03
4.	"A Little Piece"	4:15
5.	"She's so Hard"	4:33

== Charts ==
Chart performance for "Dark Storm"
Chart (2010)	Peak position
Australia (ARIA)	40
