= Lachlan Mitchell (music producer) =

Australian record producer

Lachlan Mitchell is an Australian record producer, engineer, mixer and musician.

He works at Jungle Studios in Leichhardt and Attic Studios in the Studios 301 complex in Sydney. Mitchell has worked with musicians across the spectrum, from indie rock through to black metal.

== Biography ==
Mitchell was born in London and raised in Sydney, Australia. After graduating from audio engineering at AFTRS he worked as an assistant engineer at London’s Air Studios under the management of Beatles producer George Martin. There he assisted on albums for musicians including Nik Kershaw, Phil Collins, John Martyn and Johnny Diesel. On returning to Sydney he worked at Studios 301 with Kate Ceberano, Groove Terminator, and Swoop, among others.

Since then he has worked on albums for artists including The Jezabels, Little Bastard, The Vines, Love Like Hate, Deligma, The Hard-Ons, Little Earthquake, Elliot the Bull, Eli Wolfe, Billy Thorpe, The Whitlams, Nitocris, Skulker, Henry's Anger, Something with Numbers, The Amenta, Sailmaker, One Dollar Short, Motor Ace, The Porkers, Lorelei, and The Black Lullaby.

Described as a "deep-thinking, conceptual kind of producer," he recorded and produced the critically lauded EPs and Australian Music Prize-winning debut album by The Jezabels; with all four releases having gone gold. In 2012, Mitchell received ARIA nominations for Producer of the Year and Engineer of the Year for his work on the album. Triple J described Prisoner as "the most epic and anthemic Australian album of 2011." The band has credited him with bringing together their disparate sounds and diverse interests, and helping to produce their signature "sweeping, cinematic," "grandiose, expansive soundscapes."

The Mercury describes Mitchell as "himself a bundle of contradictions who loves pop divas by day but plays in a black metal band by night," referring to his long-standing association with Nazxul. As a musician Mitchell plays various instruments including keyboards, bass, guitar, and vocals, and has played in bands including Nazxul, Guns Are For Kids and Brace.
