= Tim Omaji discography =

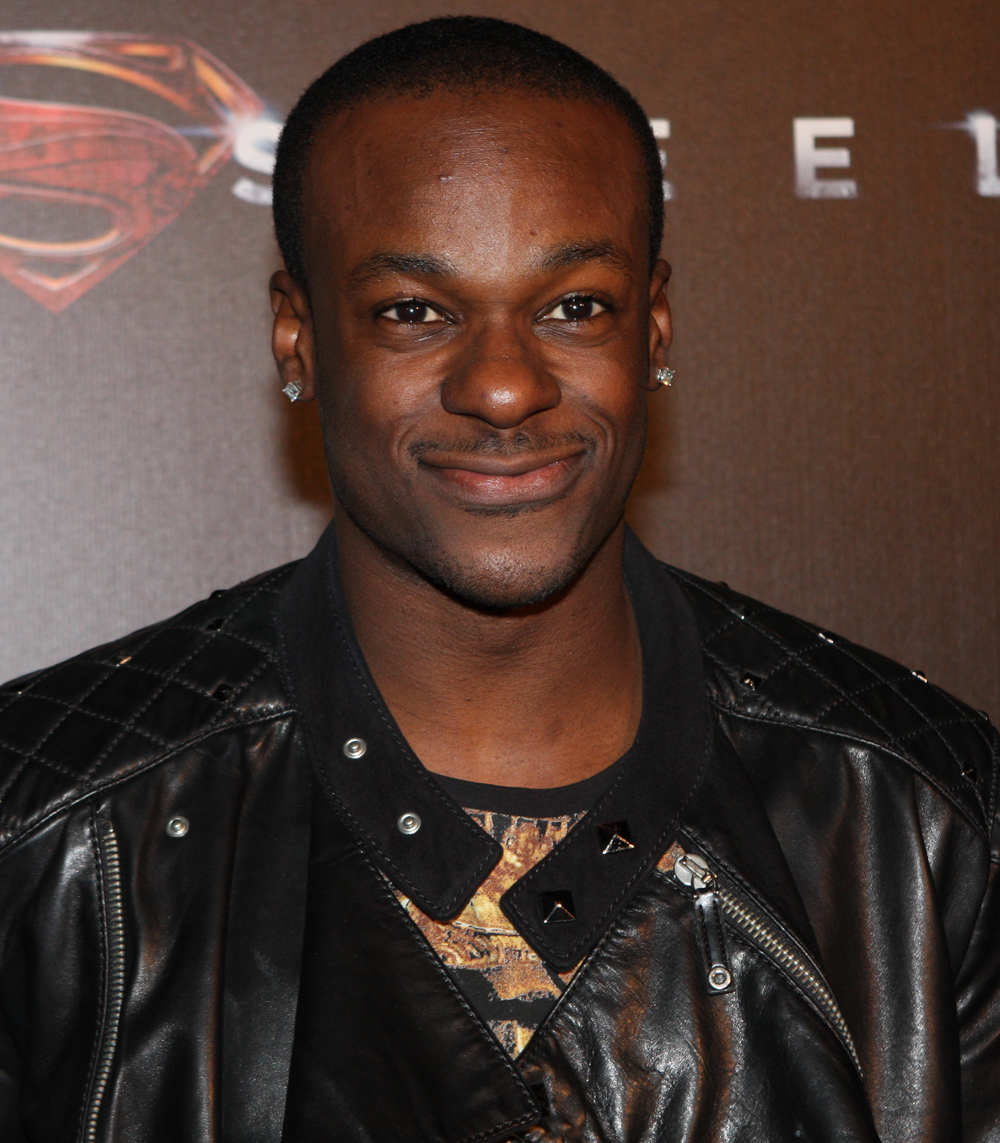
- Omaji at the Sydney premiere of Man of Steel, June 2013
- Studio albums: 3
- EPs: 2
- Singles: 23
- Music videos: 15

The discography of Australian recording artist Tim Omaji (known as Timomatic) consists of three studio albums, two extended plays, twenty-four singles (including one promotional single) and fourteen music videos. In May 2011, Omaji independently released his debut album, Welcome, which included the promotional single "Save the Dancefloor". Later that year, he signed a record deal with Sony Music Australia.

Omaji made his chart debut with "Set It Off", which reached number two on the ARIA Singles Chart and was certified four times platinum by the Australian Recording Industry Association. His second single "If Looks Could Kill" peaked at number eight and was certified double platinum. Omaji released his self-titled second album through Sony Music in August 2012, which debuted at number three on the ARIA Albums Chart. The album yielded two other top-twenty singles, "Can You Feel It" and "Incredible", which were certified platinum and gold, respectively. In 2013, Omaji released his fifth single "Parachute", which peaked at number three on the ARIA Singles Chart and was certified double platinum. In 2014, Omaji released music under his birth name Tim Omaji, before returning to Timomatic in 2017. In December, he released his second EP, Stamina

== Albums ==
=== Studio albums ===
Title	Album details	Peak chart positions
Title	Album details	AUS
Welcome	Released: 12 May 2011; Formats: Digital download	—
Timomatic	Released: 24 August 2012; Formats: CD, digital download; Label: Sony Music Australia	3
Bittersweet	Released: 1 December 2021; Formats: Digital download, streaming; Label: The Omatic Sound	—
"—" denotes an album that did not chart.

=== Extended plays ===
Title	Album details
The Rain Remixes	Released: 11 October 2013; Formats: CD, digital download; Label: Sony Music Australia
Stamina	Released: 1 December 2017; Formats: digital download, streaming; Label: Vibes Collective

== Singles ==
Title	Year	Peak chart positions		Certifications	Album
Title	Year	AUS	NZ	Certifications	Album
Credited as Timomatic
"Set It Off"	2011	2	14	ARIA: 4× Platinum; RMNZ: Gold	Timomatic
"If Looks Could Kill"	2012	8	—	ARIA: 2× Platinum	Timomatic
"Can You Feel It"	2012	18	—	ARIA: Platinum	Timomatic
"Incredible"	2012	18	17	ARIA: Gold	Timomatic
"Parachute"	2013	3	22	ARIA: 2× Platinum	—N/a
"Waterfalls"	2013	26	—		—N/a
"Everything Is Allowed"	2013	48	—		—N/a
Credited as Tim Omaji
"Delilah" (featuring Pusha T)	2014	—	—		—N/a
"Something Bout You"	2015	—	—		—N/a
"Go to Work"	2015	137	—		—N/a
Credited as Timomatic
"Swave"	2017	—	—		Stamina
"Do Want You Want"	2017	—	—		—N/a
"Stamina"	2017	—	—		Stamina
"Thinking 'Bout You"	2018	—	—		N/a
"Mash Up"	2018	—	—		N/a
"Slip"	2018	—	—		N/a
"Wait in Vain" (featuring Temgazi)	2019	—	—		N/a
"Jefe" (DJ Nino Brown featuring Timomatic and Bee Makina)	2020	—	—		N/a
"Stay"	2020	—	—		Bittersweet
"Dangerous"	2020	—	—		N/a
"Saturn"	2020	—	—		Bittersweet
"Naked Truth"	2020	—	—		Bittersweet
"Stand Up" (with Tabi Gazele)	2020	—	—		N/a
"Find A Way"	2020	—	—		N/a
"Miss You"	2020	—	—		Bittersweet
"Mine"	2020	—	—		Bittersweet
"Reflections"	2020	—	—		N/a
"Situationship"	2020	—	—		Bittersweet
"Do You Right"	2020	—	—		N/a
"Corazon"	2020	—	—		Bittersweet
"Mindset" (Solo or with Antoine)	2021	—	—		Bittersweet
"Power"	2021	—	—		N/a
"R U With Me"	2021	—	—		N/a
"Take Me"	2021	—	—		Bittersweet
"Real Thing" (with B Wise)	2022	—	—		N/a
"Location" (with Kobi Spice)	2022	—	—		N/a
"Get Home" (DJ Nino Brown featuring Omar Maayah and Timomatic)	2023	—	—		N/a
"DON'T SPEAK" (DJ Nino Brown featuring Baby Prince and Timomatic)	2024	—	—		N/a
"Polygons"	2024	—	—		Friday 6th
"Signs"	2024	—	—		Friday 6th
"Cyclone"	2024	—	—		Friday 6th
"Friday 6th"	2024	—	—		Friday 6th
"FRVR"	2025	—	—		TBA
"—" denotes a single that did not chart in that territory.

=== Promotional singles ===
Title	Year	Album
"Save the Dancefloor"	2011	Welcome

== Music videos ==
Title	Year	Director(s)
"Set It Off"	2011	
"If Looks Could Kill"	2012	
"Can You Feel It"	2012	
"Incredible"	2012	Emma Tomelty
"Parachute"	2013	Marc Furmie and Elisa Mercurio
"Waterfalls"	2013	
"Everything Is Allowed"	2013	
"Delilah"	2014	
"Something Bout You"	2015	
"Go to Work"	2015	Matthew Sharp
"Swave"	2017	
"Do What You Want"	2017	
"Do What You Want (Afrobeat Remix)"	2017	Hafiy
"Stamina"	2017	Daniel Sabouné
"Thinking About You"	2018	Daniel Sabouné
"Mash Up"	2018	Daniel Sabouné
"Naked Truth"	2020	
"Stand Up"	2020	

== Guest appearances ==
List of non-single guest appearances, with other performing artists, showing year released and album name
Title	Year	Other artist(s)	Album
"Dying Inside"	2014	Duane Harden, Jamie Drastik	#NB4U (Naked Before You)
