= Incredible (Timomatic song) =

Single by Timomatic

from the album Timomatic
- Released: 28 September 2012
- Genre: Pop
- Length: 3:56
- Label: Sony
- Songwriter(s): Timomatic, Lindsay Rimes, B. Creswell

Timomatic singles chronology
"Can You Feel It" (2012)	"Incredible" (2012)	"Parachute" (2013)

"Incredible" is a song by Australian recording artist Timomatic, taken from his self-titled second studio album. It was written by Timomatic, Lindsay Rimes and B. Creswell. The song was released physically on 28 September 2012, as the fourth single from the album. After its release, "Incredible" peaked at number 18 on the ARIA Singles Chart and was certified gold by the Australian Recording Industry Association. It also peaked at number 17 on the New Zealand Singles Chart. Emma Tomelty directed the music video which features Timomatic singing and dancing in front of a backdrop of snowy mountains, and a romantic relationship between him and his love interest.

== Background ==
"Incredible" was written by Timomatic, Lindsay Rimes and B. Creswell. Prior to the release of his self-titled second studio album, Timomatic posted a video previewing the song on YouTube. Of "Incredible" he said, "It captures the emotion of being in a relationship with someone that makes it that much better to be alive. It's a celebration of love." The song was released physically on 28 September 2012, as the fourth single from Timomatic.

== Reception ==
A writer for Take 40 Australia compared "Incredible" to Katy Perry's "Firework" (2010), and wrote that "It's got an epic and almost anthemic sound". On 17 September 2012, "Incredible" debuted at number 27 on the ARIA Singles Chart. The following week, it peaked at number 18. The song was certified gold by the Australian Recording Industry Association, denoting sales of 35,000 copies. On the New Zealand Singles Chart, "Incredible" peaked at number 17 and spent four weeks in the chart.

== Promotion ==
The accompanying music video for "Incredible" was directed by Emma Tomelty, filmed in Jindabyne, New South Wales, and premiered on Vevo on 31 August 2012. The video features scenes of Timomatic singing and dancing in front of a backdrop of snowy mountains, as well as scenes of him and his love interest staring adoringly at each other. In May 2012, Timomatic performed "Incredible" for MTV Australia's Local Produce program. He performed an acoustic version of the song in the Nova FM studio on 27 August 2012. On 29 October 2012 The Collective, a group of the fourth season of The X Factor Australia, covered "Incredible".

== Charts ==
=== Weekly charts ===
Chart (2012)	Peak position
ARIA Singles Chart	18
New Zealand Singles Chart	17

=== Year-end charts ===
Chart (2012)	Position
Australian Artists Singles Chart	33

== Certifications ==
Region	Certification	Certified units/sales
Australia (ARIA)	Gold	35,000^{^}
^{^} Shipments figures based on certification alone.
