= Straight to You – Triple J's Tribute to Nick Cave =

Compilation album
- Released: 2012
- Label: Triple J

Straight to You – Triple J's Tribute to Nick Cave is a series of live concerts and subsequent compilation album and DVD of the concerts. It was designed as a tribute to the career of Nick Cave and consisted of various artist performing songs previously performed by Cave.

The Straight To You concerts was held during Triple J's "Aus Music Month". Performed over two acts it featured a variety of singers in front of a house band. The Backing band was led by Cameron Bruce. Singers participating include Abbe May, Adalita, Alex Burnett, Ben Corbett, Bertie Blackman, Dan Sultan, Jake Stone, Johnny Mackay, Kram, Lanie Lane, Lisa Mitchell, Muscles, Paul Kelly, Tim Rogers and Urthboy. There was 8 concerts held in seven cities from 9–20 November 2011.

The Sydney concert was broadcast nationally on ABC2 TV and Triple J.

A double CD of tracks from the concerts was released in February 2012 and won an ARIA Award for Best Original Soundtrack/Cast/Show Album.

A DVD version of the concert was released in March with footage recorded at The Enmore, Sydney and the Forum, Melbourne.

== Reception ==
The CD release peaked at #32 on ARIA's Album Chart and was met with positive reviews. Krystal Maynard wrote in Beat Magazine that it was "an ambitious project that serves up some tasty morsels right alongside some catch you’d rather throw back." Lisa Rockman of The Newcastle Herald finished her 4 1/2 star review stating it is "A worthy homage to one of Australia's most respected musicians." Sydney MX's Andrea Beattie gave it 4 stars stating "This live recorded tribute to ARIA Hall of Famer Nick Cave is a fitting one; a grandiose and darkly passionate re-imagining of some of Cave's most intense and well-known tracks by some of Australia's best musicians."

== Accolades ==
Year	Award	Nomination	Result
2012	ARIA Music Awards	Best Original Soundtrack, Cast or Show Album	Won

== Album track listing ==
=== Disc 1 ===
Disc 1
No.	Title	Writer(s)	Artist	Length
1.	"Red Right Hand"	Nick Cave, Mick Harvey, Thomas Wydler	Kram
2.	"Do You Love Me?"	Cave, Martyn P. Casey	Bertie Blackman and Muscles
3.	"I Let Love In"	Cave	Muscles
4.	"Lie Down Here (& Be My Girl)"	Cave	Abbe May
5.	"Shivers"	Rowland S. Howard	Alex Burnett
6.	"Where the Wild Roses Grow"	Cave	Alex Burnett And Lanie Lane
7.	"Nick the Stripper"	Cave	Johnny Mackay
8.	"People Ain't No Good"	Cave	Johnny Mackay
9.	"The Ship Song"	Cave	Lisa Mitchell
10.	"The Weeping Song"	Cave	Jake Stone
11.	"O Children"	Cave	Urthboy
12.	"Deanna"	Cave, Harvey	Dan Sultan
13.	"From Her to Eternity"	Cave, Anita Lane, Blixa Bargeld, Hugo Race, Barry Adamson, Harvey	Tim Rogers

=== Disc 2 ===
Disc 2
No.	Title	Writer(s)	Artist	Length
1.	"Depth Charge Ethel"	Cave, Grinderman	Abbe May
2.	"Straight to You"	Cave	Adalita
3.	"Into My Arms"	Cave	Lisa Mitchell
4.	"Nobody's Baby Now"	Cave	Paul Kelly
5.	"Lament"	Cave	Paul Kelly and Adalita
6.	"Stagger Lee"	Traditional, Cave	Urthboy
7.	"The Mercy Seat"	Cave, Harvey	Bertie Blackman
8.	"Henry Lee"	Traditional	Kram
9.	"There is a Kingdom"	Cave	Lanie Lane
10.	"Get Ready For Love"	Cave, Warren Ellis, Casey, Jim Sclavunos	Dan Sultan
11.	"Papa Won't Leave You, Henry"	Cave	Adalita

== DVD Track listing ==
DVD 1

1. Red Right Hand - Kram
2. Do You Love Me? - Bertie Blackman And Muscles
3. Where The Wild Roses Grow - Alex Burnett And Lanie Lane
4. Shivers - Alex Burnett
5. Nick The Stripper - Johnny Mackay
6. The Ship Song - Lisa Mitchell
7. Deanna - Dan Sultan
8. Lie Down Here (& Be My Girl) - Abbe May
9. Nobody's Baby Now - Paul Kelly
10. There Is A Kingdom - Kram, Lisa Mitchell And Dan Sultan
11. Straight To You - Adalita
12. The Weeping Song - Jake Stone
13. Into My Arms - Lisa Mitchell
14. Stagger Lee - Urthboy
15. The Mercy Seat - Bertie Blackman
16. Henry Lee - Kram
17. Jack The Ripper - Lanie Lane
18. Get Ready For Love - Dan Sultan
19. Papa Won't Leave You, Henry - Adalita

DVD 2

1. Rehearsal footage
2. Interviews with Adalita, Lanie Lane, Bertie Blackman, Jake Stone, Urthboy, Alex Burnett, Kram and Lisa Mitchell
3. O Children - Urthboy
4. Lament - Paul Kelly And Adalita
