= 2012 ARIA Music Awards =

Annual Australian music awards

- Date: 29 November 2012
- Venue: Sydney Entertainment Centre, Sydney, New South Wales

Highlights
- Most wins: Gotye (6)
- Most nominations: 360 (10)
- Website: ariaawards.com.au

Television/radio coverage
- Network: Nine Network

The 26th Annual Australian Recording Industry Association Music Awards (generally known as the ARIA Music Awards or simply the ARIAs) were a series of award ceremonies which included the 2012 ARIA Artisan Awards, ARIA Hall of Fame Awards, ARIA Fine Arts Awards and ARIA Awards. The latter ceremony took place on 29 November at the Sydney Entertainment Centre, and was telecast on Nine Network's channel Go! at 7:30pm. The final nominees for ARIA Award categories were announced on 3 October as well as nominees and winners for Fine Arts Awards and Artisan Awards. There was no peer judged "Single of the Year" category this year due to replacing it to "Song of the Year", although the "Album of the Year" category returned. The Highest Selling Single and Album categories were removed as they were in 2010.

For the third time in ARIA Awards history, public votes were being used for the categories, "Song of the Year", "Best Australian Live Act" and "Best International Artist"; and for the first time for the category "Best Video", which was moved from the Artisan Awards. The nominees for "Song of the Year" are the ten highest selling Australian single releases during the eligibility period. Sales from different releases by the same artist cannot be aggregated, and artists are only allowed to be nominated once, even if they have more than one song in the top ten. Songs must also have been released as singles during the eligibility period. The nominees for "Best Australian Live Act" were selected by a Judging School specifically formed for the purpose. The nominees for "Best Video" were selected by the ARIA Voting Academy. The nominee pool for the "Best International Artist" was drawn from the artists whose recordings make up the top ten highest selling international releases, based on album and related single sales during the eligibility period.

The ARIA Hall of Fame inducted Yothu Yindi on 29 November at the same ceremony as the ARIA Awards.

== Performers ==
=== Pre-show ===
- Timomatic and Justice Crew – "Set It Off" / "Boom Boom"
- Jessica Mauboy – "I Can't Help Myself (Sugar Pie Honey Bunch)" / "Land of a Thousand Dances"

=== Main show ===
- Hilltop Hoods – "I Love It"
- Guy Sebastian and Lupe Fiasco – "Battle Scars"
- Missy Higgins – "Everyone's Waiting"
- Yothu Yindi with Paul Kelly, Jessica Mauboy, Dan Sultan and Peter Garrett – "Treaty"
  - In 2019 Dan Condon of Double J described this as one of "7 great performances from the history of the ARIA Awards."
- Taylor Swift – "I Knew You Were Trouble"
- The Jezabels – "Endless Summer"
- 360 featuring Gossling – "Boys like You"
- Kimbra – "Settle Down"
- The Temper Trap – "Trembling Hands"

=== House DJs ===
- Havana Brown (first half of ceremony)
- Ruby Rose (second half of ceremony)

== Presenters ==
- Lanie Lane and Josh Pyke – presented Best Independent Release
- Ella Hooper and Chris Cheney – presented Best Rock Album
- Keiynan Lonsdale and Kate Peck - presented Best Children's Album and Best Comedy Release
- Jessica Mauboy and Josh Thomas – presented Breakthrough Artist
- Ricki-Lee and Example – presented Best Dance Release
- Tom Ballard and Alex Dyson – presented Best Australian Live Act
- Lee Kernaghan and Erin McNaught – presented Best Country Album and Best Blues & Roots Album
- Martin Freeman, Andy Serkis and Richard Armitage – presented Best Pop Release
- Nicki Minaj – presented Best Urban Album
- Ryan "Fitzy" Fitzgerald and Michael "Wippa" Wipfli – presented Best International Artist
- Benji Madden and Joel Madden – presented Best Group
- Matty Acton and Mel Greig – presented Song of the Year
- Clare Bowditch and Bob Evans - presented Best Adult Contemporary Album
- Russell Brand and Barbara Elizabeth – presented Best Female Artist
- Taylor Swift and Richard Wilkins – presented Best Male Artist
- Russell Brand – presented Album of the Year
- Paul Kelly and Peter Garrett - inducts Yothu Yindi into the ARIA Hall Of Fame

== ARIA Hall of Fame Inductee ==
Indigenous music group from the Northern Territory, Yothu Yindi, were inducted into the ARIA Hall of Fame. Lead singer, M. Yunupingu, reflected on their early years, "It was very different times in those days. We were black people coming into a white world that was sceptical of our people, but through our music we were able to open minds to Aboriginal Australia and where we as a race of people were going.”

2012 ARIA Hall of Fame inductees
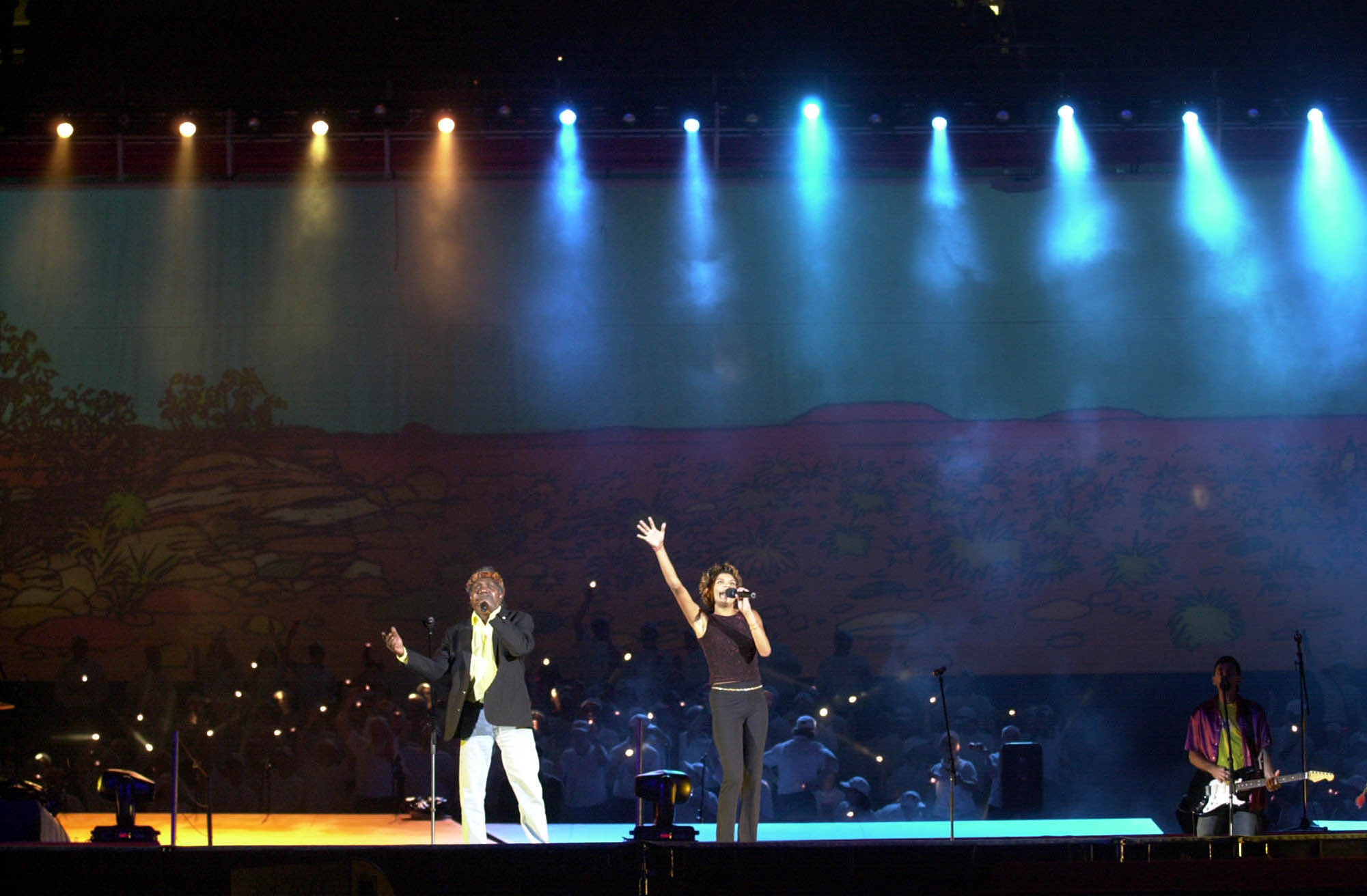
Yothu Yindi, photo taken in 2000

== Nominees and winners ==
=== ARIA Awards ===
Winners are listed first and highlighted in boldface.

Album of the Year	Best Group
**Gotye – Making Mirrors**; 360 – Falling & Flying; Missy Higgins – The Ol' Razzle Dazzle; The Jezabels – Prisoner; The Temper Trap – The Temper Trap	**The Temper Trap – The Temper Trap**; Boy & Bear – "Big Man"; Cold Chisel – No Plans; Hilltop Hoods – Drinking from the Sun; The Jezabels – Prisoner
Best Male Artist	Best Female Artist
**Gotye – Making Mirrors**; 360 – Falling & Flying; Angus Stone – Broken Brights; Guy Sebastian – "Battle Scars"; Keith Urban – "For You"; Matt Corby – Into the Flame	**Kimbra – Vows**; Jessica Mauboy – "Gotcha"; Lanie Lane – To the Horses; Missy Higgins – The Ol' Razzle Dazzle; Washington – Insomnia
Breakthrough Artist – Release	Best Independent Release
**360 – Falling & Flying**; Alpine – A is for Alpine; Lanie Lane – To the Horses; Matt Corby – "Brother"; San Cisco – Awkward	**The Jezabels – Prisoner**; Dappled Cities – Lake Air; Katie Noonan and Karin Schaupp – Songs of the Southern Skies; San Cisco – Awkward; The Bamboos – Medicine Man
Best Adult Contemporary Album	Best Blues & Roots Album
**Missy Higgins – The Ol' Razzle Dazzle**; Darren Hayes – Secret Codes and Battleships; Husky – Forever So; Josh Pyke – Only Sparrows; Katie Noonan and Karin Schaupp – Songs of the Southern Skies	**Jeff Lang – Carried in Mind**; Angus Stone – Broken Brights; Lanie Lane – To the Horses; Mia Dyson – The Moment; Paul Greene & The Other Colours – Behind the Stars
Best Hard Rock/Heavy Metal Album	Best Rock Album
**DZ Deathrays – Bloodstreams**; Buried in Verona – Notorious; Frenzal Rhomb – Smoko at the Pet Food Factory; House Vs. Hurricane – Crooked Teeth; Sleepmakeswaves – ...And So We Destroyed Everything	**The Temper Trap – The Temper Trap**; Children Collide – Monument; Cold Chisel – No Plans; Oh Mercy – Deep Heat; The Jezabels – Prisoner
Best Urban Album	Best Country Album
**Hilltop Hoods – Drinking from the Sun**; 360 – Falling & Flying; Katalyst – Deep Impressions; The Bamboos – Medicine Man; The Herd – Future Shade	**The McClymonts – Two Worlds Collide**; Beccy Cole – Songs and Pictures; Catherine Britt – Always Never Enough; McAlister Kemp – Country Proud; Troy Cassar-Daley – Home
Best Children's Album	Best Comedy Release
**The Wiggles – Surfer Jeff**; Bananas in Pyjamas - Playtime!; dirtgirlworld - Dirtgirl Rocks The Planet; Hi-5 - Sing It Loud; Rhys Muldoon - I'm Not Singing	**Buddy Goode – Unappropriate**; Anthony Salame – Is This thing On?; Arj Barker – Joy Harvest; Sammy J – Skinny Man, Modern World; The Beards – Having a Beard is the New Not Having a Beard
Best Pop Release	Best Dance Release
**Gotye – Making Mirrors**; Guy Sebastian featuring Lupe Fiasco – "Battle Scars"; Jessica Mauboy – "Gotcha"; Kimbra – Vows; San Cisco – Awkward	**Ivan Gough and Feenixpawl featuring Georgi Kay – "In My Mind"**; Havana Brown – When the Lights Go Out; Hermitude – HyperParadise; Knife Party – "Rage Valley"; Sneaky Sound System – From Here to Anywhere
Song of the Year (Note: Public voted category "Single of the Year" returned and was renamed "Song of the Year".)	Best Video (Note: "Best Video" category was moved to ARIA Awards from Artisan Awards section and was made a public voted category.)
**Matt Corby – "Brother"**; 360 featuring Gossling – "Boys like You"; Delta Goodrem – "Sitting on Top of the World"; Guy Sebastian – "Don't Worry Be Happy"; Hilltop Hoods featuring Sia – "I Love It"; Jessica Mauboy featuring Stan Walker – "Galaxy"; Justice Crew – "Boom Boom"; Reece Mastin – "Good Night"; Ricki-Lee – "Do It Like That"; Timomatic – "Set It Off"	**Missy Higgins – "Everyone's Waiting" (Director: Natasha Pincus)**; 360 featuring Gossling – "Boys like You" (Director: Alex Weltlinger); Alpine – "Hands" (Director: Luci Schroder); Hilltop Hoods featuring Sia – "I Love It" (Director: Animal Logic); Jackson Firebird – "Cock Rockin'" (Director: Brent "Quincy" Buchanan and The Grindhouse); Hermitude – "Speak of the Devil" (Director: Emma Tomelty); Kate Miller-Heidke – "I'll Change Your Mind" (Director: Darcy Prendergast and Kate Miller-Heidke); Lanie Lane – "(Oh Well) That's What You Get (Falling in Love with a Cowboy)" (Director: Josh Logue); Bluejuice – "Act Yr Age" (Director: Sam Bennetts); The Rubens – "My Gun" (Director: Josh Logue)
Best Australian Live Act (Note: Public voted category "Most Popular Australian Live Act" returned and was renamed "Best Australian Live Act".)	Best International Artist (Note: Public voted category "Most Popular International Artist" returned and was renamed "Best International Artist".)
**Gotye**; 360; Cold Chisel; Dirty Three; Hilltop Hoods; Hoodoo Gurus; Kate Miller-Heidke; The Bamboos; The Jezabels; The Living End	**One Direction**; Adele; Bruno Mars; Coldplay; David Guetta; Ed Sheeran; Florence and the Machine; LMFAO; Michael Bublé; The Black Keys

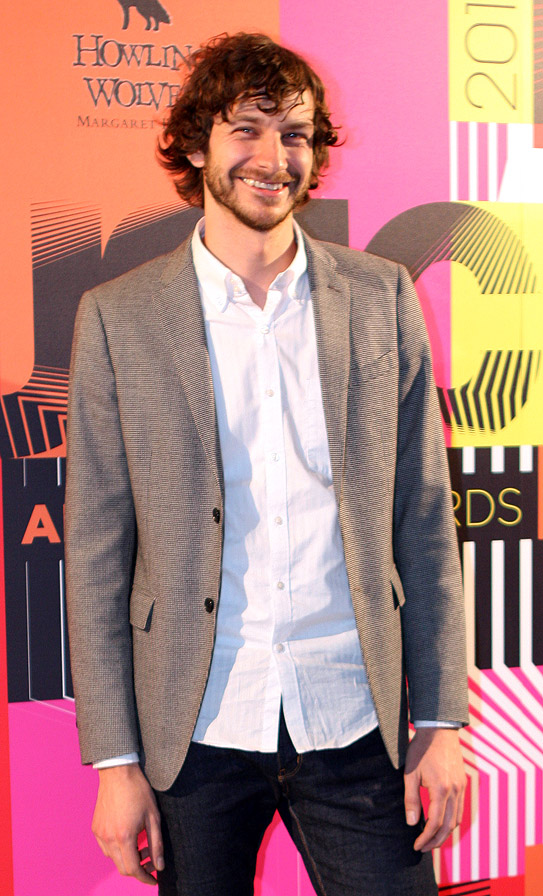
Gotye (aka Wally de Backer) was nominated for and won all six awards.

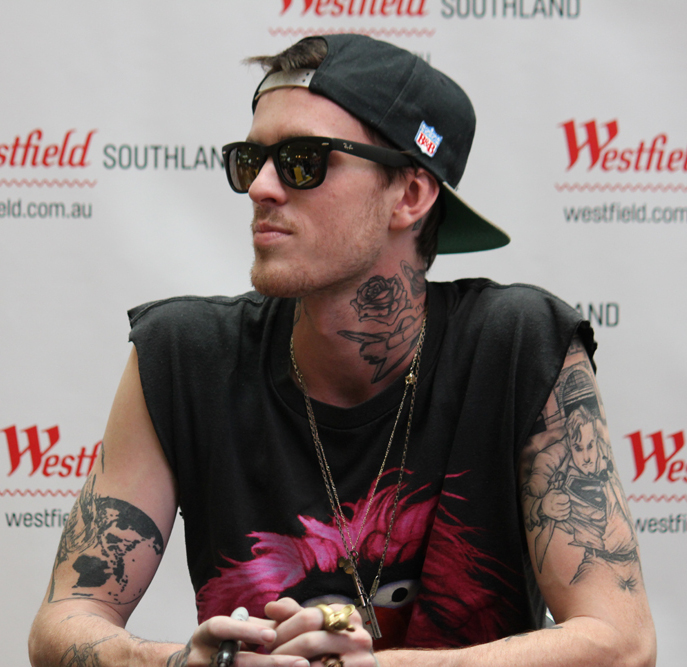
360 was nominated for ten awards and won two.

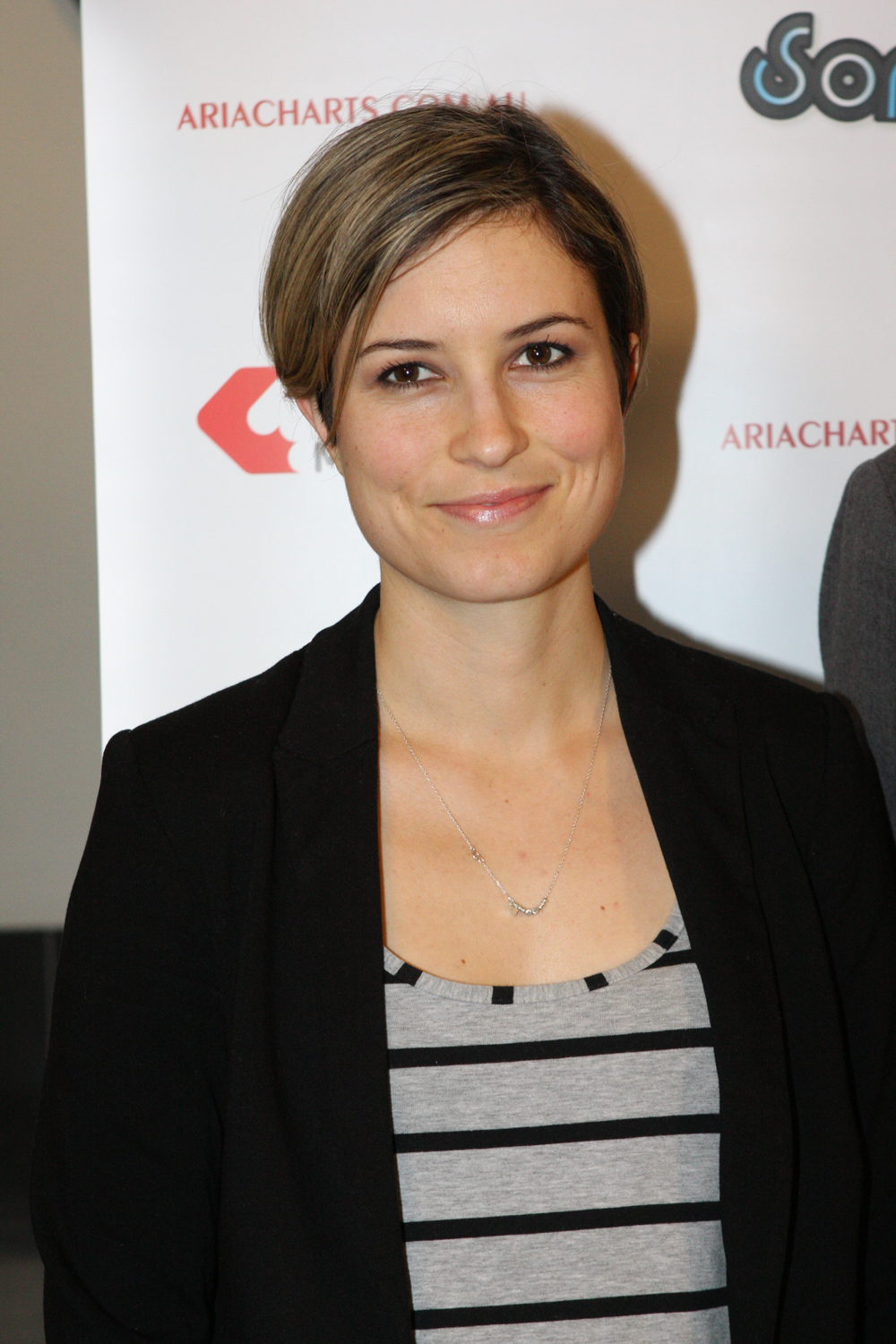
Missy Higgins was nominated for four awards and won two.

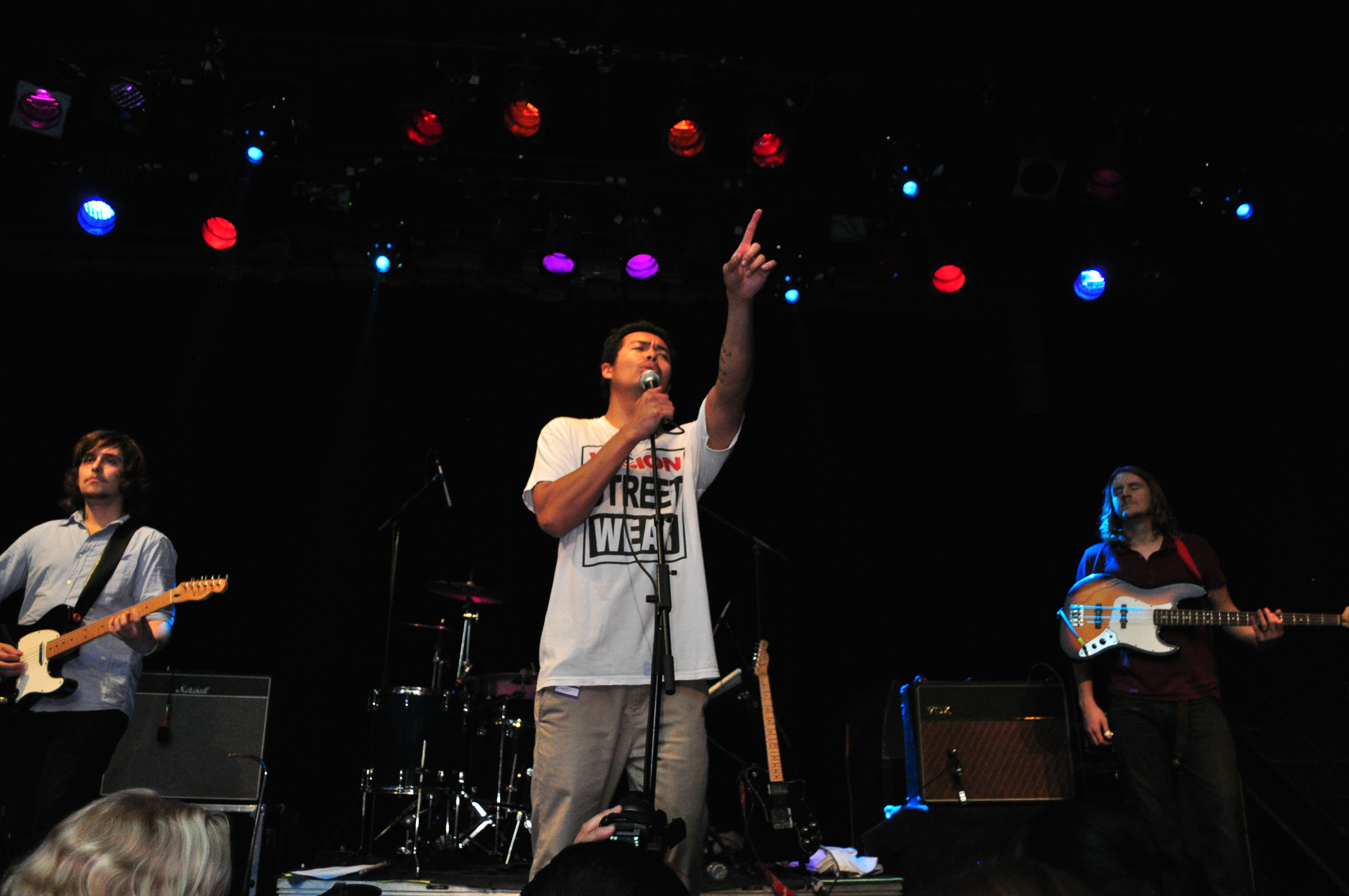
The Temper Trap was nominated for three awards and won two.

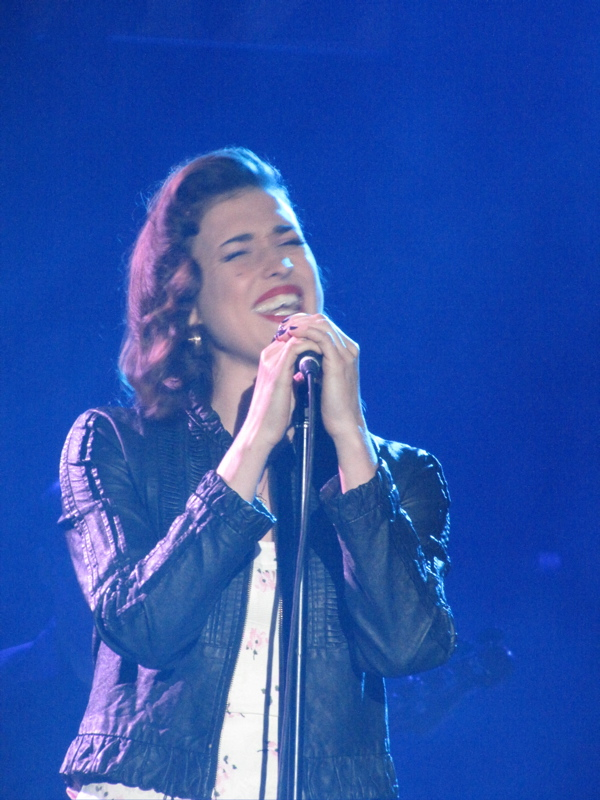
Lanie Lane was nominated for five awards.

=== Fine Arts Awards ===
Winners are listed first and highlighted in boldface. (Note: The winners of the Fine Arts Awards were announced on 3 October 2012.)

Best Classical Album
- **William Barton** – **Kalkadungu**
  - Jose Carbo with Slava and Leonard Grigoryan – My Latin Heart
  - Orchestra of the Antipodes – Bach: Brandenburg Concertos
  - Sally Whitwell – The Good, the Bad and the Awkward
  - Sydney Symphony, Vladimir Ashkenazy – Elgar: The Dream of Gerontius
Best Jazz Album
- **Sarah McKenzie** – **Close Your Eyes**
  - Barney McAll – Graft
  - Grace Knight – Keep Cool Fool
  - James Morrison – Snappy Too
  - Bernie McGann – Wending
  - Steven Rossitto – Night & Day
Best Original Soundtrack/Cast/Show Album
- **Triple J** – **Straight to You – Triple J's Tribute to Nick Cave**
  - Jane Rutter – An Australian in Paris
  - RocKwiz – The RocKwiz Christmas Album
  - Jon English & the Original Cast of the Rock Show – The Rock Show
  - Various Artists – The Sapphires Original Soundtrack
Best World Music Album
- **Joseph Tawadros** – **Concerto of the Greater Sea**
  - Dead Can Dance – Anastasis
  - Nicky Bomba's Bustamento – Intrepid Adventures to the Lost Riddim Island
  - Sarah Calderwood – As Night Falls
  - Warren H Williams & the Warumungu Songmen – Winanjjara: The Song Peoples Sessions

=== Artisan Awards ===
Winners are listed first and highlighted in boldface. (Note: The winners of the Artisan Awards were announced on 3 October 2012.)

Best Cover Art
- **Frank de Backer and Wally de Backer** – **Gotye** – **Making Mirrors**
  - Carlo Santone – Gurrumul featuring Sarah Blasko – "Bayini"
  - Christopher Doyle – The Jezabels – Prisoner
  - Debaser – 360 – Falling & Flying
  - Rennie Ellis – Oh Mercy – Deep Heat
Engineer of the Year
- **François Tétaz** – **Gotye** – **Making Mirrors**
  - Lachlan Mitchell – The Jezabels – Prisoner
  - Matt Fell – Tim Freedman – Australian Idle
  - Scott Horscroft and Phillip Threlfall – 360 – Falling & Flying
  - Wayne Connolly – Josh Pyke – Only Sparrows
Producer of the Year
- **Styalz Fuego** – **360** – **Falling & Flying**
  - Chong Lim – Sarah McKenzie – Close Your Eyes
  - Lachlan Mitchell – The Jezabels – Prisoner
  - Lanie Lane – Lanie Lane – To the Horses
  - Virginia Read – Sally Whitwell – The Good, the Bad and the Awkward

== See also ==
- Music of Australia
