= Sarah McKenzie =

Australian singer-songwriter and pianist

- Born: 6 November 1987 (age 38)
- Origin: Australia
- Genre: Jazz

Sarah McKenzie is an Australian jazz musician. She is a singer, pianist, composer, and arranger. Her album Close Your Eyes won the 2012 ARIA Music Award for Best Jazz Album. She was also nominated for the same award in 2011 with Don't Tempt Me and in 2015 for We Could Be Lovers. We Could Be Lovers won an Australian Jazz Bell Award in 2015 for Best Australian Jazz Vocal Album.

== Discography ==
=== Albums ===
Title	Details
Don't Tempt Me	Released: 2011; Label: ABC Music (2770600)
Close Your Eyes	Released: August 2012; Label: ABC Music (3709594)
We Could Be Lovers	Released: 31 October 2014; Label: ABC Music (3794794)
Paris in the Rain	Released: January 2017; Label: Impulse!
Secrets of My Heart	Released: 29 March 2019; Label: Normandy Lane Music

== Awards ==
=== ARIA Music Awards ===
The ARIA Music Awards is an annual awards ceremony that recognises excellence, innovation, and achievement across all genres of the music of Australia.

Year	Nominee / work	Award	Result	Ref.
2011	Don't Tempt Me	Best Jazz Album	Nominated	
2012	Close Your Eyes	Best Jazz Album	Won	
2012	Chong Lim for Close Your Eyes	Producer of the Year	Nominated	
2015	We Could Be Lovers	Best Jazz Album	Nominated	

=== Jazz Bell Awards ===
The Australian Jazz Bell Awards are annual music awards for the jazz music genre in Australia.

Year	Nominee / work	Award	Result
2015	We Could Be Lovers	Best Australian Jazz Vocal Album	Won
