= To the Horses =

Studio album by Lanie Lane
- Released: 14 October 2011
- Recorded: 2011
- Studio: Chris Rollans @ King Street
- Label: Ivy League Records
- Producer: Lanie Lane

Lanie Lane chronology
Live at the Vanguard (2010)	To the Horses (2011)	Night Shade (2014)

Singles from To the Horses
- 1. "What Do I Do" Released: September 2010; 2. "Like Me Meaner" Released: July 2011; 3. "Ain't Hungry"/"My Man" Released: August 2011; 4. "Bang Bang" Released: September 2011; 5. "(Oh Well) That's What You Get (Falling in Love with a Cowboy)" Released: October 2011; 6. "To the Horses" Released: June 2012

To the Horses is the debut studio album by Australian musician Lanie Lane, released in October 2011. The album peaked at number 12 on the ARIA Charts and was certified gold in 2013.

At the ARIA Music Awards of 2012, Lane was nominated for fives awards. At the AIR Awards of 2012, Lane won the Best Independent Blues and Roots Album for To the Horses.

== Reception ==
A reviewer at JB HiFi said "Adding sass to the smoky, sultry sounds of a bygone era, Lanie Lane is an undeniable talent who draws on the past and plants it very firmly in the here and now. Imbued with the spirit of Muddy Waters, and channeling the grit of Billie Holiday, Lanie Lane wraps the sounds of a golden age around a voice that is as rich and warm as it is sweet."

== Track listing ==
1. "Bang Bang" - 2:04
2. "Betty Baby" - 3:02
3. "Like Me Meaner" - 3:38
4. "What Do I Do" - 2:46
5. "What Trouble Is" - 3:08
6. "That's What You Get" (also known as "(Oh Well) That's What You Get (Falling in Love with a Cowboy)")- 2:57
7. "Jungle Man" - 3:53
8. "The Devil's Sake" - 3:13
9. "Don't Cry" - 2:39
10. "Heartbeat" - 4:47
11. "To the Horses" - 3:18
12. "Ain't Hungry" (bonus track) - 2:13
13. "My Man" (bonus track) - 3:45
- All tracks written by Lanie Lane.

== Charts ==
Chart (2011)	Peak position
Australian Albums (ARIA)	12

== Certifications ==
Region	Certification	Certified units/sales
Australia (ARIA)	Gold	35,000^{^}
^{^} Shipments figures based on certification alone.

== Release history ==
Country	Date	Format	Label	Catalogue
Australia	14 October 2011	Digital download, CD, LP	Ivy League Records	IVY122, IVY132
