= Dance Boss =

- Genre: Reality
- Presented by: Dannii Minogue
- Country of origin: Australia
- Original language: English
- No. of series: 1
- No. of episodes: 6

Production
- Running time: 60 mins (including ads)

Original release
- Network: Seven Network
- Release: 6 August – 4 September 2018

Dance Boss is an Australian reality television dance competition on the Seven Network presented by Dannii Minogue. The performers are judged by stage and film performer Adam Garcia, singer and dancer Timomatic and actress and performer Sharni Vinson. The dancers perform to music provided by the resident DJ for the show, Sketch from Australian duo Bombs Away (group).

== Format ==
Teams of workers from the same workplace or profession compete to win a cash prize of $100,000. In each show, costumed teams dance-off in staged dance battles which are judged and scored on three factors. The dance crews are whittled down to one winning troupe who is crowned "Dance Boss Australia".
