= Súnas =

- Origin: Brisbane, Queensland, Australia
- Genre: Celtic
- Years active: 2008–present
- Label: ABC Classics/Universal
- Members: Sarah Calderwood; Paul Brandon; Mannie McAllister; Jamie Corfield
- Past members: Michael Patrick; Bridget Masters
- Website: sunasband.com

Súnas are an Australian Celtic four-piece band based in Brisbane.

Members have included Sarah Calderwood, Paul Brandon, Mannie McAllister, Michael Patrick, Bridget Masters and Jamie Corfield. They play a wide range of instruments such as flute, whistles, bouzouki, mandolin, guitar, bodhran, gazoukie and fiddle.

Súnas released their debut album, A Breath Away from Shadow, in January 2008. They followed with Celtic Road in February 2011. The album peaked at No. 4 on the ARIA Classical Albums chart.

== Band members ==
- Sarah Calderwood
- Paul Brandon
- Mannie McAllister
- Michael Patrick

== Discography ==
- A Breath Away from Shadow (2008) – Independent
- Celtic Road (14 February 2011) – ABC Classics/Universal Music Australia (4764288) – AUS Classical: No. 4
