= Sarah Calderwood =

Australian singer-songwriter flautist

- Genres: Contemporary folk, contemporary classical
- Occupations: Singer, musician
- Instruments: Flute, whistles
- Formerly of: Súnas; TwoCrows; RedCrow
- Website: sarahcalderwood.com

Sarah Calderwood is an Australian singer-songwriter and flautist who unites classic with contemporary folk.

She studied playing the classical flute at an early age and had a brief stint in the musical theatre programme at Central Queensland Conservatorium of Music in Mackay, Australia. At 19, she joined Súnas, an Australian Celtic folk group with founding members Mannie McAllister and Paul Brandon. They played over 1200 shows together, headlining Australian and international festivals and touring. As well as fronting the band on vocals, flute and whistles, in 2006 Sarah took over the management of Súnas as well. Súnas released two highly successful albums, Breath Away from Shadow (2008) and Celtic Road (2011) and a release of a concert DVD. Celtic Road charted in the ARIA Classical Top 10.

Calderwood also had her solo career. She recorded Bushes & Briars accompanied by the Melbourne Symphony Orchestra. In 2011, she released her album As Night Falls accompanied the Tasmanian Symphony Orchestra conducted by Andrew Greene. The 11-track album of traditional songs included collaborations by Mike Scott (vocals), musical accompaniment by Alan Kelly on the accordion, Shane Nicholson and Bob Spencer on guitar, Lee Novak on bass, David Jones on percussions. She was nominated for ARIA Award for Best World Music Album for her album.

In 2013, she played flute and contributed vocals to The Waterboys on their Australian tour. In 2013, she performed Australia-wide with Paul Brandon of Súnas as an acoustic music duo called The Two Crows. Later she formed a brand new American/roots/blues band called RedCrow which plans to releasing an EP.

== Discography ==
=== Albums ===
| Title | Details | Peak positions |
| Title | Details | AUS Classical |
|---|---|---|
| Improvisations | Released: 2011; Label: ABC Classics (476 4677); Formats: CD | 15 |

== Awards and nominations ==
=== ARIA Music Awards ===
The ARIA Music Awards is an annual awards ceremony that recognises excellence, innovation, and achievement across all genres of Australian music. They commenced in 1987.

| Year | Nominee / work | Award | Result | Ref. |
|---|---|---|---|---|
| 2012 | As Night Falls | Best World Music Album | Nominated | |
