= Close Your Eyes (Sarah McKenzie album) =

Studio album by Sarah McKenzie
- Released: 3 August 2012
- Studio: River Studios, Melbourne
- Genre: Jazz
- Length: 58:44
- Label: ABC
- Producer: Chong Lim

Sarah McKenzie chronology
Don't Tempt Me (2011)	Close Your Eyes (2012)	We Could Be Lovers (2014)

Close Your Eyes is the second studio album by Australian jazz musician Sarah McKenzie, released in August 2012.

At the ARIA Music Awards of 2012 it won Best Jazz Album.

== Background and release ==
McKenzie told Australian Jazz that she sits down at the piano with a larger selection of songs she’d like to work with and to 'see what happens'. She said she chooses songs that she 'loves or that have special significance' and the end result is Close Your Eyes; a group of songs that she wanted to release. There is a mix of jazz standards, soul and pop tunes and a couple of originals.

== Track listing ==
1. "Close Your Eyes" (Bernice Petkere) – 2:29
2. "Too Young" (Sylvia Dee, Sidney Lippman) – 5:45
3. "The Way You Look Tonight" (Dorothy Fields, Jerome Kern) – 5:45
4. "The Lovers' Tune" (Sarah McKenzie) – 5:04
5. "Big Yellow Taxi" (Joni Mitchell) – 6:46
6. "Got to Be This Way" (McKenzie) – 5:15
7. "I Remember You" (Victor Schertzinger, Johnny Mercer) – 5:55
8. "Don't Get Around Much Anymore" (Duke Ellington, Bob Russell) – 4:14
9. "At Last" (Mack Gordon, Harry Warren) – 6:09
10. "Blue Skies" (Irving Berlin) – 5:25
11. "I Should Care" (Axel Stordahl, Paul Weston, Sammy Cahn) – 6:04

== Charts ==
=== Year-end charts ===
Chart (2012)	Position
Australian Top Jazz & Blues Albums (ARIA)	33
