= Can You Feel It (Timomatic song) =

Single by Timomatic

from the album Timomatic
- Released: 22 June 2012
- Recorded: 2011
- Genre: Pop
- Length: 3:16
- Label: Sony
- Songwriter(s): Nic Martin, Timomatic, Matt Cenere

Timomatic singles chronology
| "If Looks Could Kill" (2012) | "Can You Feel It" (2012) | "Incredible" (2012) |

"Can You Feel It" is a song by Australian recording artist Timomatic, released digitally on 22 June 2012, as the third single from his self-titled second studio album. The song was produced by Nic Martin and co-written by Matt Cenere. "Can You Feel It" peaked at number 18 on the ARIA Singles Chart and was certified Platinum by the Australian Recording Industry Association.

== Background and composition ==
During an interview with the Australian Associated Press, Timomatic described "Can You Feel It" as an "upbeat single" which he feels is his "strongest" to-date. He went on to say that it has "more of the futuristic edge than 'Set It Off'", the singer's previous single.

== Track listing ==
- Digital download
1. "Can You Feel It" – 3:16

== Charts ==
=== Weekly charts ===
| Chart (2012) | Peak position |
|---|---|
| Australia (ARIA) | 18 |

=== Year-end charts ===
| Chart (2012) | Position |
|---|---|
| Australian Artists Singles Chart | 28 |

== Certifications ==
| Region | Certification | Certified units/sales |
|---|---|---|
| Australia (ARIA) | Platinum | 70,000^{^} |
^{^} Shipments figures based on certification alone.

== Release history ==
| Country | Date | Format | Label |
|---|---|---|---|
| Australia | 22 June 2012 | Digital download | Sony Music Australia |
