= Everything Is Allowed =

Single by Timomatic
- Released: November 10, 2013
- Recorded: 2013
- Genre: Dance-pop
- Length: 3:19
- Label: Sony Music Australia
- Songwriters: Jimmy Thörnfeldt, Geraldo Sandell, Johnny Powers Severin
- Producers: Jimmy Joker, Johnny Powers Severin

Timomatic singles chronology
"Waterfalls" (2013)	"Everything Is Allowed" (2013)	"Delilah" (2014)

"Everything Is Allowed" is a song by Nigerian-born Australian singer-songwriter and dancer Timomatic. It was released as a digital download in Australia on November 10, 2013. It is the third single from his yet-to-be-titled second studio album, originally due in 2014.

The song was co-written and co-produced by Jimmy Joker, who has previously worked with Jennifer Lopez, Nicole Scherzinger and Dizzee Rascal as well as Timomatic's frequent collaborators, Geraldo Sandell and Johnny Powers Severin.

== Track listings ==
Digital download
No.	Title	Length
1.	"Everything Is Allowed"	3:19

== Promotion ==
From August 2013, Timomatic was a judge on Australia's Got Talent, with the live shows airing in September. Timomatic premiered his new single "Everything Is Allowed" during the series final, which aired on November 12.

On November 22, Timomatic performed the song on Today.

Later that night, he promoted the song at 'The Marquee', Sydney. On November 29, Timomatic performed the song during his one-night-only show at The Palms at Crown.

== Video ==
The video for "Everything Is Allowed" was released on 20 November 2013 via his VEVO account. and quickly appeared on other pop music websites, including MTV, ARIA and amp radio.

The video features Timomatic partying throughout. The video was also noted for a bright pink jacket Timomatic wears.

== Chart performance ==
Despite the live performance exposure on the final Australia's Got Talent, the single debuted and peaked at number 48.

=== Weekly charts ===
Chart (2013)	Peak position
Australia (ARIA)	48

== Release history ==
Region	Date	Format	Label
Australia	10 November 2013	Digital download	Sony Music Australia
New Zealand	10 November 2013	Digital download	Sony Music Australia
