= Emma Tomelty =

Australian film maker

- Occupations: Film director and producer

Emma Tomelty is an Australian creative director, with a background in dance, choreography and fashion. Tomelty has worked on music videos by Australian artists including Timomatic, Ricki-Lee Coulter, Hermitude and Jessica Mauboy.

== Awards and nominations ==
=== ARIA Music Awards ===
The ARIA Music Awards is an annual awards ceremony that recognises excellence, innovation, and achievement across all genres of Australian music. They commenced in 1987.

Year	Nominee / work	Award	Result	Ref.
2012	Emma Tomelty for Hermitude "Speak of the Devil"	Best Video	Nominated	
2017	Emma Tomelty for Jessica Mauboy "Fallin'"	Best Video	Nominated	

=== J Awards ===
The J Awards are an annual series of Australian music awards that were established by the Australian Broadcasting Corporation's youth-focused radio station Triple J. They commenced in 2005.

Year	Nominee / work	Award	Result
2011	Emma Tomelty for Hermitude' "Speak of the Devil"	Australian Video of the Year	Won
