= Lanie Lane =

Australian singer-songwriter (born 1987)

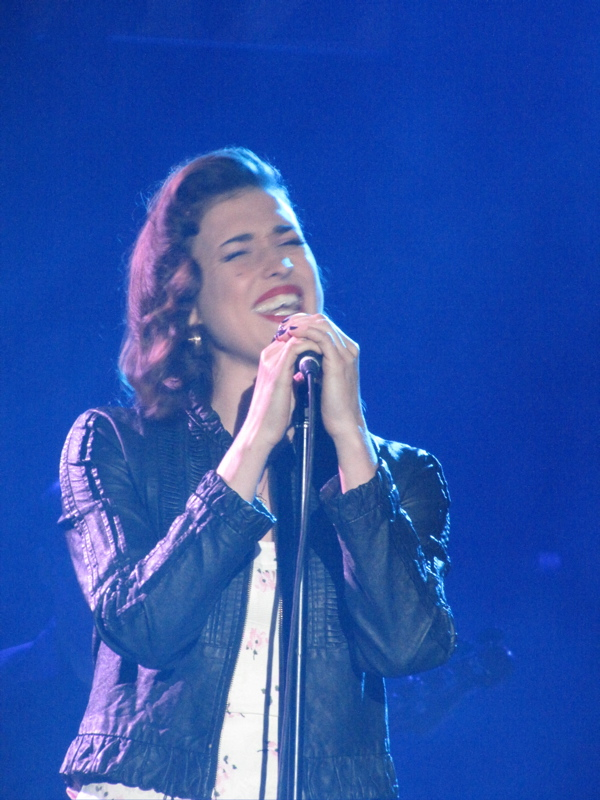
- Lane in December 2011

Background information
- Born: Lanier Stefanie Myra Johnston; 11 February 1987 (age 39)
- Origin: Sydney, Australia
- Genres: Blues, jazz, rockabilly
- Occupation: Singer-songwriter
- Instruments: Guitars, percussion
- Years active: 2006–2015
- Labels: Third Man, Mushroom, Ivy League
- Website: lanielane.net

Lanie Lane (born 11 February 1987) is the stage name of Lanier Stefanie Myra Johnston, an Australian blues-jazz singer-songwriter and guitarist. Lane released two studio albums between 2011 and 2014. At the ARIA Music Awards of 2012, Lane was nominated for five awards. In February 2015, Lane announced she was "quitting" the music industry.

Lane used a 1957 guitar named Betty, a 1966 electric Gibson named BoDidd (after Bo Diddley) and an unnamed 1960 archtop guitar. The album track, "Betty Baby", is dedicated to the guitar.

== Biography ==
=== 1987–2009: early years ===
Lanie (pronounced "Lannie") Lane was born on 11 February 1987 as Lanier Stefanie Myra Johnston and grew up in Sydney. Before becoming famous she spent most of her time and interest in music and writing songs.

=== 2010–2013: To the Horses ===
On 24 September 2010, she issued her debut single, "What Do I Do", which was the theme song for the Australian Broadcasting Corporation TV series, Crownies from July to December 2011.

In February 2011, Lane recorded the majority of her debut album. In August 2011, Lane released her first vinyl single, the double-A sided "Ain't Hungry"/"My Man". In August 2011, Lane recorded "(Oh Well) That's What You Get (Falling in Love with a Cowboy)". According to Lane the track is a result of somniloquy, "I woke up one morning and my boyfriend said, 'You said the weirdest thing in your sleep last night'. He told me and said you'd better write a song about it. I wrote the song and he said, 'Well, that's one side of the story'".

Lane's debut album, To the Horses, was self-produced, released on Ivy League Records in October 2011 and it peaked at No. 12 on the ARIA Albums Chart.

In February 2012 she opened for Icehouse and Hall & Oates at a Day on the Green performance.

In March 2012, Lane covered The Black Keys' track, "Gold on the Ceiling", for Triple J's program, Like a Version.

At the APRA Music Awards of 2012, Lane was nominated for four awards. Her song "(Oh Well) That's What You Get (Falling in Love with a Cowboy)" was performed by Kram (Spiderbait). At the ARIA Music Awards of 2012, Lane was nominated for five awards. To the Horses was certified gold in Australia in 2013.

=== 2014–2015: Night Shade to quitting music ===
In August 2014, Lane released "Celeste" the lead single from her second studio album, Night Shade, which was released in October 2014. Night Shade peaked at number 42 on the ARIA Charts.

In February 2015, Lane announced she's quitting the music industry indefinitely, admitting the "rock n roll lifestyle is no longer for me". In a lengthy statement, Lane said her love of creating, writing and playing music is still a "true joy" but the ambition for fame and attention in the industry is "completely" gone.

== Discography ==
=== Studio albums ===
Title	Details	Peak chart positions	Certifications
Title	Details	AUS	Certifications
To the Horses	Released: 14 October 2011; Label: Ivy League Music (IVY 122); Format: CD, download, LP	12	ARIA: Gold
Night Shade	Released: 24 October 2014; Label: Ivy League Music (IVY 248); Format: CD, download, LP	42	

=== Extended plays ===
Title	Details
Live at the Vanguard	Released: 2010; Label: Lanie Lane (LL-001); Format: CD; Note: Limited release live recording

=== Singles ===
Year	Title	Album
2010	"What Do I Do"	To the Horses
2011	"Now You're Home" (with Clare Bowditch)	Are You Ready Yet (Clare Bowditch EP)
2011	"Like Me Meaner"	To the Horses
2011	"Ain't Hungry"/"My Man"	To the Horses
2011	"Bang Bang"	To the Horses
2011	"(Oh Well) That's What You Get (Falling in Love with a Cowboy)"	To the Horses
2012	"To the Horses"	To the Horses
2014	"Celeste"	Night Shade
2014	"No Sound"	Night Shade

== Awards and nominations ==
=== AIR Awards ===
The Australian Independent Record Awards (commonly known informally as AIR Awards) is an annual awards night to recognise, promote and celebrate the success of Australia's Independent Music sector.

Year	Nominee / work	Award	Result
2012	To the Horses	Best Independent Blues and Roots Album	Won

=== APRA Awards ===
The APRA Awards is an awards event, presented annually since 1982 by the Australasian Performing Right Association (APRA), "honouring composers and songwriters". Lane has been nominated for five awards.

Year	Nominee / work	Award	Result
2012	"(Oh Well) That's What You Get (Falling in Love with a Cowboy)" (Lanie Lane)	Blues & Roots Work of the Year	Nominated
2012	"(Oh Well) That's What You Get (Falling in Love with a Cowboy)" (Lanie Lane)	Song of the Year	Nominated
2012	"What Do I Do" (Lanie Lane)	Blues & Roots Work of the Year	Nominated
2012	Lanie Lane	Breakthrough Songwriter of the Year	Nominated
2013	"The Devil's Sake" (Lanie Lane)	Blues & Roots Work of the Year	Nominated
2013	"Like Me Meaner" (Lanie Lane)	Blues & Roots Work of the Year	Nominated

=== ARIA Music Awards ===
The ARIA Music Awards is an annual awards ceremony that recognises excellence, innovation, and achievement across all genres of Australian music. Lane has been nominated for five awards.

Year	Nominee / work	Award	Result
2012	To the Horses	Best Female Artist	Nominated
2012	To the Horses	Best Blues & Roots Album	Nominated
2012	To the Horses	Breakthrough Artist - Release	Nominated
2012	Lanie Lane for To the Horses	Producer of the Year	Nominated
2012	"(Oh Well) That's What You Get (Falling in Love with a Cowboy)"	Best Video	Nominated

=== EG Awards ===
The EG Awards) are an annual awards night celebrating Victorian music.

Year	Nominee / work	Award	Result
2012	herself	Best Female	Won

=== J Award ===
The J Awards are an annual series of Australian music awards that were established by the Australian Broadcasting Corporation's youth-focused radio station Triple J. They commenced in 2005.

Year	Nominee / work	Award	Result
2011	herself	Unearthed Artist of the Year	Nominated
