= Timomatic (album) =

Studio album by Timomatic
- Released: 24 August 2012
- Recorded: 2011–12
- Genre: Pop, dance-pop, electropop, R&B
- Label: Sony Music Australia

Timomatic chronology
Welcome (2011)	Timomatic (2012)

Singles from Timomatic
- 1. "Set It Off" Released: 18 November 2011; 2. "If Looks Could Kill" Released: 23 March 2012; 3. "Can You Feel It" Released: 22 June 2012; 4. "Incredible" Released: 28 September 2012

Timomatic is the second self-titled studio album by Australian recording artist Timomatic. It was released in Australia on 24 August 2012. The album peaked at number 3 in Australia. The album includes the singles "Set It Off", "If Looks Could Kill", "Can You Feel It" and "Incredible".

== Singles ==
- "Set It Off" was released as the lead single from the album on 18 November 2011. The song peaked at number 2 in Australia and number 14 in New Zealand.
- "If Looks Could Kill" was released as the second single from the album on 23 March 2012. The song peaked at number 8 in Australia.
- "Can You Feel It" was released as the third single from the album on 22 June 2012. The song peaked at number 18 in Australia.
- "Incredible" was released as the fourth single from the album on 28 September 2012. The song peaked at number 18 in Australia and number 17 in New Zealand.

== Track listing ==
Standard listing
No.	Title	Length
1.	"Can You Feel It"	3:16
2.	"If Looks Could Kill"	3:38
3.	"Explode"	3:13
4.	"Moment to Love"	3:35
5.	"Incredible"	3:56
6.	"Set It Off"	3:19
7.	"Satellites"	3:50
8.	"AYO (That's What I Like)"	3:17
9.	"Get to Know You"	3:40
10.	"Give Me Your Love" (featuring Miracle)	3:30
11.	"Trust"	3:46
12.	"On My Mind"	3:39
13.	"Rest of Our Lives"	3:49

== Chart performance ==
Chart (2012)	Peak position
Australian Albums (ARIA)	3

== Release history ==
Region	Release date	Format	Label
Australia	24 August 2012	Digital Download, CD	Sony Music Australia
