= Parachute (Timomatic song) =

Single by Timomatic
- Released: 5 June 2013
- Recorded: 2013
- Genre: R&B
- Length: 3:40
- Label: Sony
- Songwriters: Teddy Sky, Johnny Powers Severin, Ameerah Roelants, Jimmy Joker
- Producers: Johnny Powers Severin, Jimmy Joker

Timomatic singles chronology
"Incredible" (2012)	"Parachute" (2013)	"Waterfalls" (2013)

"Parachute" is a song by Nigerian-born Australian singer-songwriter and dancer Timomatic. It was released as a digital download in Australia on 5 June 2013. The song peaked at number three on the ARIA Singles Chart and was certified two times platinum by the Australian Recording Industry Association.

"Parachute" and its accompanying music video were nominated at the 2013 ARIA Music Awards for Song of the Year and Best Video.

== Background ==
"Parachute" was written by Teddy Sky, Johnny Powers, Ameerah Roelants and Jimmy Thornfeldt. Timomatic recorded the single in Los Angeles with producer Johnny Powers. Timomatic and Powers had penned two tracks together before Powers, part of super producer RedOne's team of hitmakers, played him "Parachute". Timomatic said, "I wanted that track, it's my sound, it's perfect." When speaking about the song, he said: "When the emotion is real, it's easy to sing about, easy to write about, easy to be inspired. The song is about a guy having complete trust in his other half to jump into any situation and know you're going to be OK is a big thing, a very big thing."

"Parachute" was released digitally on 5 June 2013.

== Promotion ==
The music video for "Parachute" was directed by Marc Furmie and Elisa Mercurio, and released onto YouTube on 19 June 2013. The video was nominated for Best Video at the 2013 ARIA Music Awards. Timomatic performed "Parachute" for the first time at the 2013 State of Origin game one, held at ANZ Stadium in Sydney on 5 June." He then went on to perform "Parachute" on the final of The Block season 7.

== Track listings ==
Digital download
No.	Title	Length
1.	"Parachute"	3:40

== Charts ==
=== Weekly charts ===
Chart (2013)	Peak position
Australia (ARIA)	3
New Zealand (Recorded Music NZ)	22

=== Year-end charts ===
Chart (2013)	Position
ARIA Singles Chart	45
Australian Artists Singles Chart	5

== Certifications ==
Region	Certification	Certified units/sales
Australia (ARIA)	2× Platinum	140,000^{^}
^{^} Shipments figures based on certification alone.

== Release history ==
Region	Date	Format	Label
Australia	5 June 2013	Digital download	Sony Music Australia
Austria	5 June 2013	Digital download	Sony Music Australia
Belgium	5 June 2013	Digital download	Sony Music Australia
Canada	5 June 2013	Digital download	Sony Music Australia
Denmark	5 June 2013	Digital download	Sony Music Australia
Finland	5 June 2013	Digital download	Sony Music Australia
France	5 June 2013	Digital download	Sony Music Australia
Ireland	5 June 2013	Digital download	Sony Music Australia
Italy	5 June 2013	Digital download	Sony Music Australia
Netherlands	5 June 2013	Digital download	Sony Music Australia
New Zealand	5 June 2013	Digital download	Sony Music Australia
Norway	5 June 2013	Digital download	Sony Music Australia
Portugal	5 June 2013	Digital download	Sony Music Australia
Spain	5 June 2013	Digital download	Sony Music Australia
Sweden	5 June 2013	Digital download	Sony Music Australia
Switzerland	5 June 2013	Digital download	Sony Music Australia
United Kingdom	5 June 2013	Digital download	Sony Music Australia
United States	5 June 2013	Digital download	Sony Music Australia
