= If Looks Could Kill (Timomatic song) =

Single by Timomatic

from the album Timomatic
- Released: 23 March 2012
- Recorded: 2011
- Genre: Dance-pop
- Length: 3:39
- Label: Sony
- Songwriters: Anthony Egizii, David Musumeci, Timomatic
- Producer: DNA Songs

Timomatic singles chronology
"Set It Off" (2011)	"If Looks Could Kill" (2012)	"Can You Feel It" (2012)

"If Looks Could Kill" is a single by Australian recording artist Timomatic, released digitally on 23 March 2012, as the second single from his self-titled second studio album. He co-wrote the song with Anthony Egizii and David Musumeci of the production duo DNA Songs, who also handled the song's production. "If Looks Could Kill" peaked at number eight on the ARIA Singles Chart and was certified double platinum by the Australian Recording Industry Association for selling 140,000 copies.

== Background ==
Timomatic co-wrote "If Looks Could Kill" with Anthony Egizii and David Musumeci of production duo DNA Songs, who also produced the track. The song was released digitally on 23 March 2012.

== Track listing ==
- Digital download
1. "If Looks Could Kill" – 3:39

== Charts ==
=== Weekly charts ===
Chart (2012)	Peak position
Australia (ARIA)	8

=== Year-end charts ===
Chart (2012)	Position
ARIA Singles Chart	83
Australian Artists Singles Chart	10

== Certifications ==
Region	Certification	Certified units/sales
Australia (ARIA)	2× Platinum	140,000^{^}
^{^} Shipments figures based on certification alone.

== Release history ==
Country	Date	Format	Label
Australia	23 March 2012	Digital download	Sony Music Australia
