= Waterfalls (Timomatic song) =

Single by Timomatic
- Released: 13 September 2013
- Recorded: 2013
- Genre: Dance-pop
- Length: 3:32
- Label: Sony
- Songwriter(s): Arnthor Birgisson, Tim Omaji
- Producer(s): Arnthor Birgisson

Timomatic singles chronology
"Parachute" (2013)	"Waterfalls" (2013)	"Everything Is Allowed" (2013)

"Waterfalls" is a song by Nigerian-born Australian singer-songwriter and dancer Timomatic. It was released as a digital download in Australia on 13 September 2013. The song peaked at number 26 on the Australian Singles Chart.

== Track listings ==
Digital download
No.	Title	Length
1.	"Waterfalls"	3:32

== Charts ==
=== Weekly charts ===
Chart (2013)	Peak position
Australia (ARIA)	26

=== Year-end charts ===
Chart (2013)	Position
Australian Artists Singles Chart	37

== The Rain Remixes ==
Cover art for The Rain Remixes.

On 11 October, Timomatic released a 6-track EP titled The Rain Remixes, which included five versions of "Waterfalls" and one of "Parachute".

=== Track listing ===
1. "Waterfalls"
2. "Waterfalls" (Kid Massive Remix)
3. "Waterfalls" (Katt Niall Remix)
4. "Waterfalls" (Jam XpressRemix)
5. "Waterfalls" (Red Rocket Orange Remix)
6. "Parachute" (Stevie Mink Remix)

== Release history ==
Region	Date	Format	Label
Australia	13 September 2013	Digital download	Sony Music Australia
New Zealand	13 September 2013	Digital download	Sony Music Australia
