= Set It Off (Timomatic song) =

Single by Timomatic

from the album Timomatic
- Released: 18 November 2011
- Length: 3:19
- Label: Sony Music
- Songwriter(s): DNA Songs, Timomatic
- Producer(s): DNA Songs

Timomatic singles chronology
"Set It Off" (2011)	"If Looks Could Kill" (2012)

"Set It Off" is the debut single by Australian recording artist Timomatic, released digitally on 18 November 2011, as the lead single from his self-titled second studio album. It was written by Timomatic and DNA Songs, who also produced the track. Timomatic stated that the song is "about having fun on the dance floor" and loving life. "Set It Off" peaked at number two on the ARIA Singles Chart and was certified four times platinum by the Australian Recording Industry Association. It also appeared on the New Zealand Singles Chart at number 14 and was certified gold by the Recording Industry Association of New Zealand.

== Background ==
"Set It Off" was written by Timomatic and DNA Songs, who also produced the song. Speaking of the song, Timomatic said: "In a global sense, the first thing I want people to know about me as an artist is 'Set It Off'. It shows off my energy and my musical style, and the video shows just how much I love to dance. I really believe that 'Set It Off' is the first official sound of Timomatic – it's the closest I've ever come to finding a perfect representation of me." He stated that the song is "about having fun on the dance floor and loving life."

"Set It Off" was released digitally on 18 November 2011. An extended play, featuring two remixes of "Set It Off", as well as an additional track, was released as a CD on 2 December 2011. The extended play was released digitally on 9 December 2011.

== Chart performance ==
"Set It Off" debuted at number 39 on the ARIA Singles Chart on 12 December 2011, and peaked at number two on 23 January 2012. "Set It Off" also appeared on the ARIA Urban Singles Chart at number two. It was certified four times platinum by the Australian Recording Industry Association, for selling 280,000 copies. On the New Zealand Singles Chart, "Set It Off" debuted at number 21 on 9 January 2012, and peaked at number 14 on 30 January 2012. It was certified gold by the Recording Industry Association of New Zealand, for selling 7,500 copies.

== Promotion ==
The music video for "Set It Off" premiered online on 18 November 2011. Many scenes throughout the video are intercut. The video opens with Timomatic arriving at a bar dressed in a blue, red and white shirt, blue jeans, red cap and sneakers. He then starts to play the song and freestyle dances to it. During the first chorus, the video cuts to Timomatic performing on stage in front of a black backdrop, dressed in a black leather jacket, jeans and shades. Intercut scenes of Timomatic dancing in the green room of the bar are then shown. The video then cuts back to the bar scenes, where Timomatic and his two male dancers perform choreography. Intercut scenes of Timomatic dancing on the staircase are then shown. On 6 January 2012, Timomatic performed "Set It Off" on Sunrise. He also performed the song at Miss Universe 2012 in Las Vegas.

== Track listing ==
- Digital download
1. "Set It Off" – 3:20
- CD single
1. "Set It Off" – 3:19
2. "Set It Off" (Neon Stereo Remix) – 5:18
3. "Set It Off" (Dean Coleman Remix) – 4:36
4. "Save the Dancefloor" – 3:14

== Charts ==
=== Weekly charts ===
Chart (2011–12)	Peak position
ARIA Singles Chart	2
ARIA Urban Singles Chart	2
New Zealand Singles Chart	14

=== Year-end charts ===
Chart (2011)	Position
Australian Artists Singles Chart	19

Chart (2012)	Position
ARIA Singles Chart	34
ARIA Urban Singles Chart	9
Australian Artists Singles Chart	6

== Certifications ==
Region	Certification	Certified units/sales
Australia (ARIA)	4× Platinum	280,000^{^}
New Zealand (RMNZ)	Gold	7,500^{*}
^{*} Sales figures based on certification alone.^{^} Shipments figures based on certification alone.

== Release history ==
Country	Date	Format	Label
Australia	18 November 2011	Digital download	Sony Music Australia
Canada	18 November 2011	Digital download	Sony Music Australia
Ireland	18 November 2011	Digital download	Sony Music Australia
New Zealand	18 November 2011	Digital download	Sony Music Australia
United Kingdom	18 November 2011	Digital download	Sony Music Australia
Australia	2 December 2011	CD single	Sony Music Australia
Australia	9 December 2011	Digital EP	Sony Music Australia
