= Tim Omaji =

Australian musician

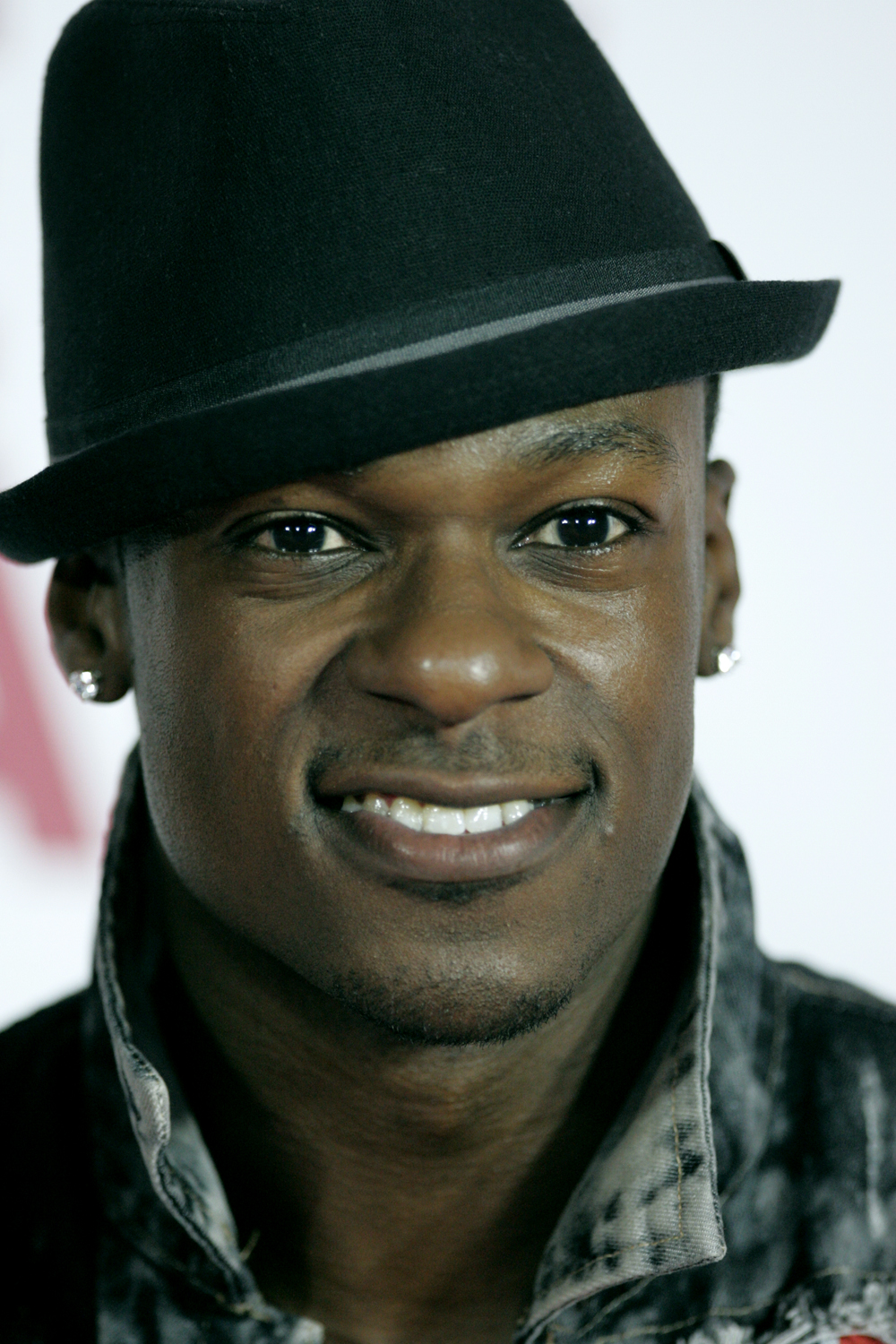
- Omaji at the I Give It a Year Australian premiere in January, 2013

Background information
- Also known as: Timomatic, Mitch Crotty
- Born: Timothy Ugbedo Omaji; 9 September 1987 (age 39); Kaduna, Nigeria
- Origin: Sydney, New South Wales, Australia
- Genres: Pop, dance, R&B
- Occupations: Singer-songwriter, record producer, dancer, choreographer, magician
- Instruments: Vocals
- Years active: 2009–present
- Label: Sony
- Website: timomaticworld.com

Timothy Ugbedo Omaji (born 9 September 1987), better known by his stage name Timomatic, is a Nigerian-born Australian singer-songwriter and dancer. Omaji rose to fame as a contestant on So You Think You Can Dance (Australia) in 2009 and placed seventh in the competition. In 2011, he appeared as a contestant on the fifth season of Australia's Got Talent and was placed third. Later that year, Omaji signed with Sony Music Australia and released his first single, "Set It Off", in November 2011, which peaked at number two on the ARIA Singles Chart and was certified four times platinum by the Australian Recording Industry Association.

== Early life ==
Timothy Ugbedo Omaji was born in Kaduna, Nigeria, on 9 September 1987. He emigrated to Australia with his family when he was 10 months old. His father was an academic and was sent to different positions around Australia. Omaji has an older brother and sister, and a younger sister. He came from a musical family, with his father often playing guitar and the rest of his family displaying their passion for singing and dancing. At the age of nine, Omaji formed a band with his family and he was the percussionist for that band. During the intermission of their shows, Omaji would go on stage mimicking Michael Jackson's singing and dancing skills. His parents have now moved back to Nigeria. He spent part of his life in Darwin, Northern Territory where he taught a break dancing class. He left Darwin in 2003 and moved to Canberra.

At the age of 15, he was nicknamed "Timomatic" by his friends, because of his hip-hop dancing skills. He also secured a part-time position as artistic director and choreographer of dance company Kulture Break in Canberra. He represented Kulture Break in overseas performances, including the United States, China and Singapore. Timomatic finished Year 12 at Narrabundah College and then spent six months at University of Canberra before dropping out. In 2008, he attended music school JMC Academy for a year and got a diploma in entertainment, majoring in vocal training. Omaji stated: "I did this because I wanted to get my vocals and music up to scratch; that was me paying attention and focusing on my music."

== Career ==
=== 2009–12: Reality shows, Welcome and Timomatic ===
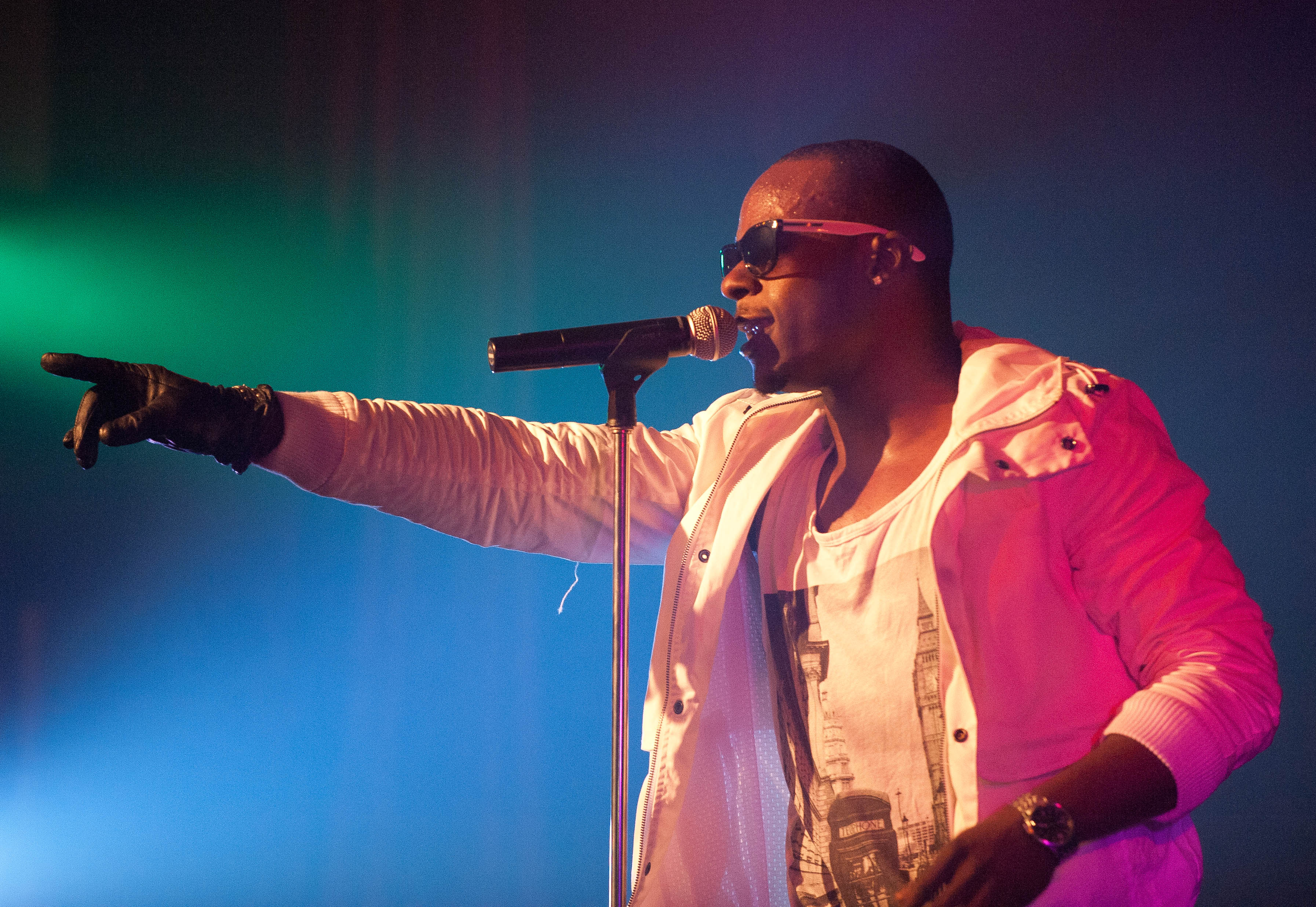
Timomatic in concert, 2011

In 2009, Omaji appeared as a finalist on the second season of So You Think You Can Dance Australia and reached the top eight. In 2010, he went on to play the role of Tyrone Jackson in the Australian version of Fame the Musical. Omaji later withdrew from his role in the musical due to a back injury. This led to him focussing more on producing music. Omaji then began writing songs with DJ Poet, the official DJ for The Black Eyed Peas. In 2011, Omaji appeared as a contestant on the fifth season of Australia's Got Talent. He chose to audition for the show to prove that he was more than just a dancer, and chose Australia's Got Talent over The X Factor because it gave him full control over what he did, from music to styling. Omaji placed third in the competition, with Jack Vidgen announced as the winner.

On 12 May 2011, Omaji released his independent debut studio album, Welcome, which he began working on during his time in Fame. "Save the Dancefloor" was released as a promotional single from the album on 1 August 2011. In October 2011, Omaji was as a supporting act for American rapper Flo Rida's Australian tour. On 17 November 2011, it was announced that Omaji had signed a recording contract with Sony Music Australia. On 24 November, he was a supporting act for American hip hop group Salt-n-Pepa's Australian concert at the Enmore Theatre in Sydney. Omaji's debut single "Set It Off" was released on 25 November. It peaked at number two on the ARIA Singles Chart and was certified four times platinum by the Australian Recording Industry Association, denoting sales of 280,000 copies. "Set It Off" peaked at number 14 on the New Zealand Singles Chart and was certified gold by the Recording Industry Association of New Zealand, denoting sales of 7,500 copies.

On 12 January 2012, it was announced that Omaji had signed a global publishing deal with EMI. His second single "If Looks Could Kill" was released on 23 March 2012. It peaked at number eight on the ARIA Singles Chart and was certified double platinum, denoting sales of 140,000 copies. In May 2012, Omaji was a supporting act for Nicki Minaj's Australian leg of her Pink Friday Tour. His third single "Can You Feel It" was released on 22 June 2012. It peaked at number 18 on the ARIA Singles Chart and was certified platinum, denoting sales of 70,000 copies. In August 2012, Omaji was a supporting act, alongside Havana Brown and Taio Cruz, for Pitbull's Australian leg of his Planet Pit World Tour. His self-titled second album was released on 24 August 2012, which debuted at number three on the ARIA Albums Chart. On 3 October 2012, Omaji received his first ARIA Music Award nomination for Song of the Year for "Set It Off". Omaji received more international exposure at the Miss Universe 2012 beauty pageant, where he performed in front of a huge global audience.

=== 2013–2016: Subsequent releases, return to Australia's Got Talent, and name change ===
Omaji's fifth single "Parachute" was released on 5 June 2013, after he debuted it at the first 2013 State of Origin game. "Parachute" peaked at number 3 on the ARIA Singles Chart and was certified two times platinum. In New Zealand, it peaked at number 22 and spent five weeks in the top 40. In August 2013, Omaji returned for the seventh season of Australia's Got Talent, this time as a judge alongside Dawn French, Geri Halliwell, Kyle Sandilands and host Julia Morris. His sixth single "Waterfalls" was released on 13 September 2013, and peaked at number 26 on the ARIA Singles Chart. Omaji's first extended play, The Rain Remixes, was released on 11 October 2013, featuring five versions of "Waterfalls" and one of "Parachute". On 12 November 2013, Omaji released his seventh single "Everything Is Allowed", after premiering it on the Australia's Got Talent series final. In September 2014, Omaji won Male Artist of the Year at the Afro-Australia Music and Movie Awards. In October 2014, Omaji released his eighth single "Delilah", featuring American rapper Pusha T, and it failed to chart.

In January 2015, he changed his name from Timomatic to his birth name Tim Omaji. Omaji was the supporting act for Jessie J's Australian tour in March 2015. His ninth single "Something Bout You" was released on 6 March 2015, and was his first single released under the name Tim Omaji. Omaji's tenth single "Go to Work" was released on 30 October 2015.

=== 2017–present: Stamina and Dance Boss ===
In 2017, returned to releasing music under his stage name Timomatic. On 1 April 2017, Timomatic released "Swave", followed by "Do Want You Want" in July. In December, Timomatic released his second EP Stamina.

In April 2018, the Seven Network announced Timomatic has been appointed one of the three judges for up-coming new dance competition Dance Boss, alongside Sharni Vinson and Adam Garcia and hosted by Dannii Minogue.

From October and November 2018, Timomatic will play Sam Onatou in the Australian season of MADIBA The Musical – A Celebration of the Life of Nelson Mandela.

On 1 December 2021, Timomatic surprise released the album Bittersweet posting on Facebook "This project has been a labor of love. From R&B to Afrofusion, come vibe with me".

On the 4 August 2022, Timomatic played at the Melbourne University law ball to a wild reception. Omaji also appeared in the Australian production of Moulin Rouge in 2022 under the name Tim Omaji.

In 2023, Timomatic became an ambassador for BYD.

In 2023, Omaji played the role of Ike Turner in the Australian production of the Tina – The Tina Turner Musical.

In August of 2026, it was announced that Omaji would be starring in the upcoming 2027 Sydney production of Moulin Rouge, returning to the role of Lautrec

== Discography ==
- Welcome (2011)
- Timomatic (2012)
- Bittersweet (2021)

== Filmography ==
Television
Year	Title	Role	Notes
2009	So You Think You Can Dance Australia	Himself; Contestant	
2012	Talkin' 'Bout Your Generation	Himself; guest appearance	1 episode
2011, 2013	Australia's Got Talent	Himself; Contestant, Judge	
2018	Dance Boss	Himself; Judge	
2021	Clickbait (miniseries)	Jimmy Akintola	1 episode

== Concert tours ==
Supporting

- Nicki Minaj's Pink Friday Tour: Australian leg (2012)
- Pitbull's Planet Pit World Tour: Australian leg (2012)
- Jessie J's Australian Tour (2015)
- Highvale Secondary College's Millenial Tour: VCAA leg (2017)

== Awards and nominations ==
Year	Type	Award	Result
2011	Poprepublic.tv IT List Awards	Australian Male Artist	Nominated
2011	Poprepublic.tv IT List Awards	Breakthrough Artist of 2011	Nominated
2012	ARIA Music Awards	Song of the Year ("Set It Off")	Nominated
2012	Channel [V] Awards	[V] Oz Artist of the Year	Nominated
2013	APRA Music Awards	Most Played Australian Work ("Set It Off")	Won
2013	ARIA Music Awards	Song of the Year ("Parachute")	Nominated
2013	ARIA Music Awards	Best Video ("Parachute")	Nominated
2013	MTV Europe Music Awards	MTV Europe Music Award for Best Australian Act	Nominated
2013	Channel [V] Awards	[V] Oz Artist of the Year	Nominated
2013	Poprepublic.tv Awards	Favourite Australian Male Artist	Nominated
2013	Poprepublic.tv Awards	Favourite Single of 2013 ("Waterfalls")	Nominated
2014	Nickelodeon Kids' Choice Awards	Aussies' Fave Homegrown Talent	Nominated
2014	Logie Awards	Most Popular New Talent (Australia's Got Talent)	Nominated
2014	World Music Awards	World's Best Male Artist	Nominated
2014	World Music Awards	World's Best Song ("Parachute")	Nominated
2014	World Music Awards	World's Best Video ("Parachute")	Nominated
2014	Afro-Australia Music and Movie Awards	Male Artist of the Year	Won
2024	APRA Music Awards	Most Performed R&B / Soul Work for "Falling" by Dean Brady (Dean Brady, Jacob Farah, Jerome Farah, Kara-Lee James, Tim Omaji, Rahel Phillips)	Nominated
