= Hunter Street, Newcastle =

Road in Newcastle, New South Wales

Hunter Street New South Wales
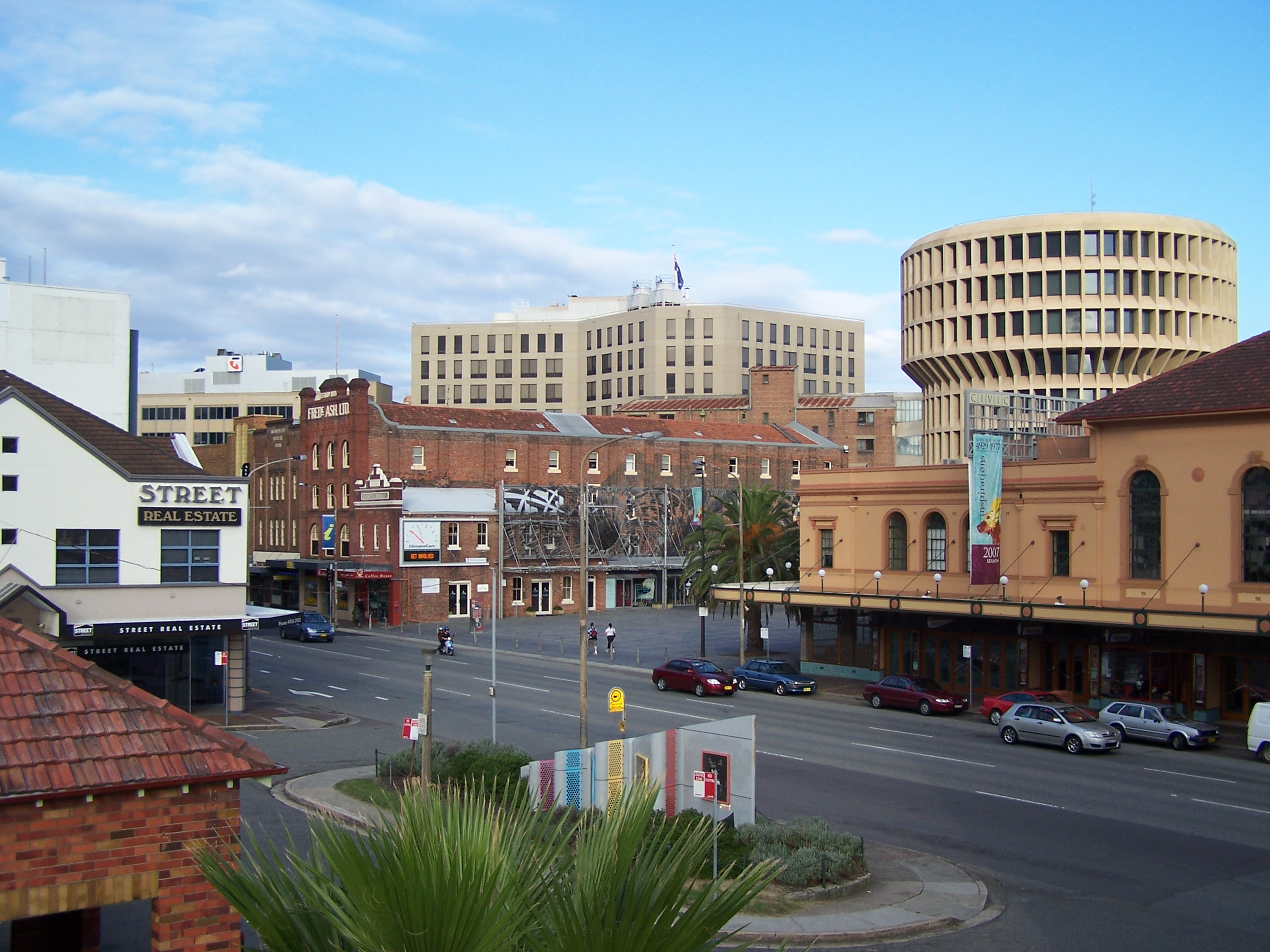
- Hunter Street, Newcastle from Civic Railway Station. To the right is the Newcastle Civic Theatre
- Location of Hunter Street in New South Wales
- Coordinates: 32°55′41.4″S 151°47′7.2″E

General information
- Type: Street
- Length: 3.4 km (2.1 mi)
- Opened: 1823
- Maintained by: Newcastle City Council

Major junctions
- East end: Pacific Street; Newcastle, New South Wales
- Darby Street; Union Street; Stewart Avenue; Tudor Street
- West end: Selma Street; Newcastle West, New South Wales

Location(s)
- Region: Hunter Region
- LGA(s): City of Newcastle
- Suburb(s): Newcastle (suburb); Newcastle West

Hunter Street is a major road in the Newcastle central business district, in New South Wales. The street, formerly three separate thoroughfares, extends from Pacific Street in the city's east, to Selma Street in Newcastle West and since 2008 has been the focus of community-led creative enterprises and projects. Established as the city's main street for commercial and retail activity, Hunter Street entered a period of severe decline after World War II. Since 2008, the eastern end of Hunter Street has emerged as a precinct for niche retail and the night-time economy. In June 2012 it was announced that the pedestrian mall between Perkins and Newcomen Streets will be redeveloped by the public and private sectors to stimulate the city's ongoing revitalisation.

== History ==
Hunter Street runs in the vicinity of an early nineteenth-century track known as Wellington Street that extended from Watt Street (formerly George Street) in the east to Perkins Street in the west. The strip was renamed Hunter Street by Henry Dangar in 1823 and by the mid nineteenth-century commercial and residential properties had been built on most addresses east of Perkins Street. Recalling the town in 1866, Mr. Thomas Brown described Hunter Street as "unpaved, grass grown and deserted". West of Perkins Street, the Australian Agricultural Company owned a separate track that ran to what is today Bank Corner. From here, in the vicinity of the existing Bellevue Street, another track called Charlton Street continued west to Dairy Farmer's Corner (Tudor Street) and out to the Islington Bridge. By century's end, Blane and Charlton Streets had been renamed Hunter Street West and today these three streets are considered to be one.

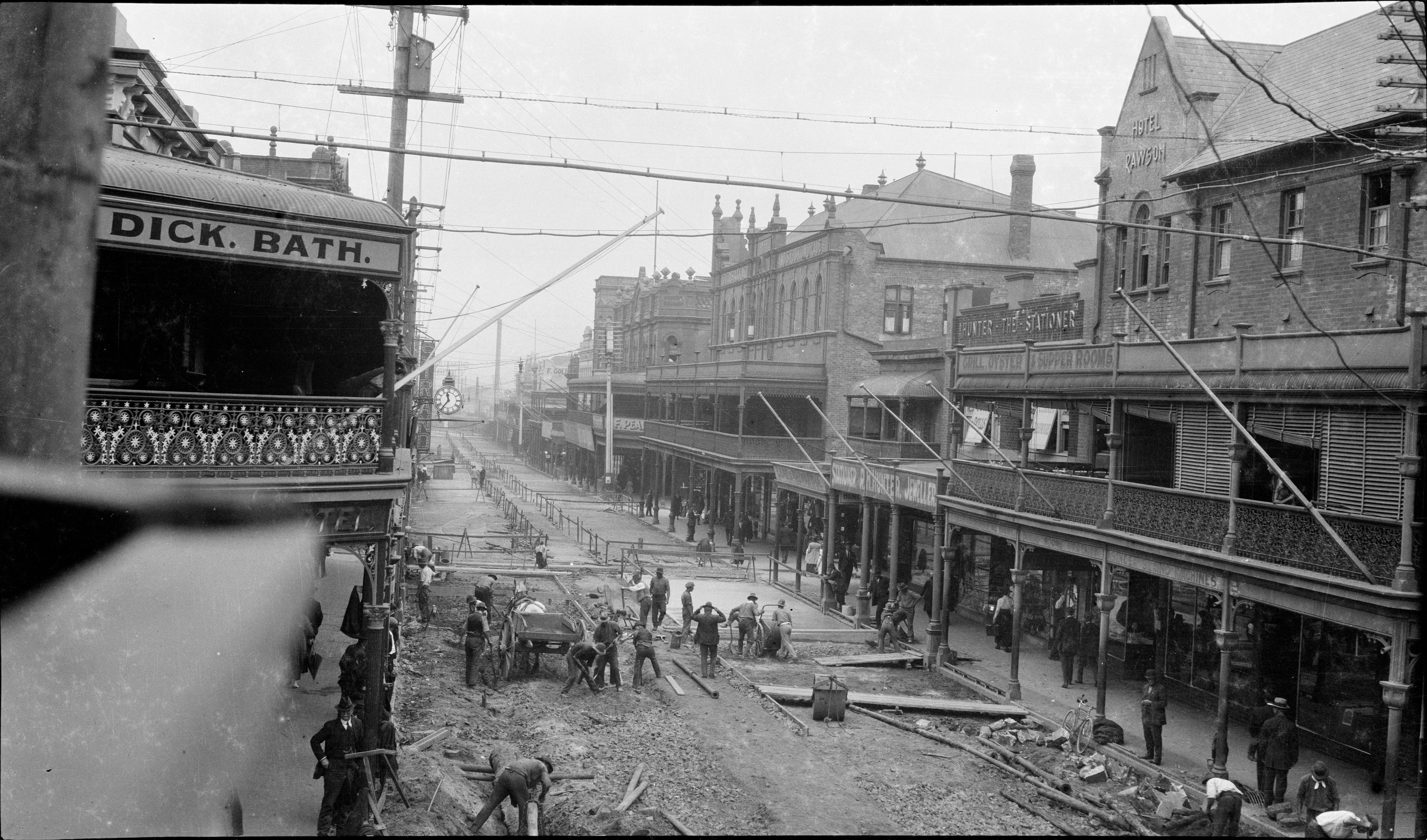
Workmen laying concrete paving, Hunter Street, ca. 1921, Sam Hood

By 1900, Hunter Street stretched from its original eastern terminus to Dairy Farmer's Corner. In this year, 26 hotels were operating along the street with the majority of buildings concentrated east of the intersection with Darby Street. Development gained momentum after the introduction of steam trams in 1887 and the first restrictions on vehicular traffic drawn by animals was introduced in 1898. Drainage problems and raw sewerage necessitated the sealing of Hunter Street, first carried out with wooden blocks, concrete and asphalt, and the street was extended east to Telford Street in the early years of last century.

Following the opening of the Newcastle Steelworks during 1915, Newcastle became increasingly suburban and Hunter Street developed as a destination for commerce and retail. The size and extravagance of Newcastle's early twentieth-century department stores demonstrates the popularity of city shopping. Scotts Limited and W. Winn & Co. Pty Ltd erected landmark stores near the original confluence of Hunter and Blane Streets, creating the eastern bookend of a retail strip that by mid-century stretched to the Newcastle & Suburban Co-operative Society (better known as "The Store") near Dairy Farmer's Corner.

As well as department stores, picture palaces also began to punctuate Hunter Street in the years leading up to World War II. Entertainment was concentrated in two precincts, one around the Palais Royale and Theatre Royal (Steel to Bellevue Streets), and the other from Perkins Street to the former Strand Theatre at the intersection with Market Street. The electrification of the city's tram network delivered thousands of people into the city on any given Friday and Saturday nights, creating greater connectivity with suburbs in the city's west and south.

In the decade that followed World War II, the rapid suburbanisation of Newcastle created unprecedented competition for traditional retail areas. The opening of shopping centres in Kotara, Jesmond and Charlestown, triggered a steady migration away from Hunter Street despite the completion of a pedestrian mall between Perkins and Newcomen Streets in the 1970s. Construction in the city centre stagnated during this period of decentralisation, expedited by a destructive earthquake in 1989.

After the earthquake Hunter Street remained inaccessible for two weeks. A recession in the early 1990s, coupled with record youth unemployment, brought the emptying of Hunter Street to a nadir in 2008. In this year, with the vacancy rate at 20% and chronically vacant properties beginning to deteriorate, Marcus Westbury created the Renew Newcastle initiative to activate empty shop fronts in and around the Hunter Street Mall. Since 2008, the Renew model has activated over 100 properties in the city centre and many of these projects have addressed Hunter Street.

In recent years, independent art galleries and niche retail has flourished in Hunter Street. The Newcastle Art School, a campus of Hunter Institute of TAFE established in the 1890s is also located in Hunter Street. East of Auckland Street, near City Hall, independent coffee shops, restaurants and small bars have been appearing along the streetscape since 2009. According to the Newcastle Herald in July 2013, the Hunter Street vacancy rate is less than half that of 2008 and business confidence has improved in precincts east of City Hall. In June 2012, NSW State Government's land and property developer, Landcom, purchased two thirds of The GPT Group's Newcastle city centre landholdings for $20 million and plan to develop four city blocks into a combination of residential, commercial and retail space.

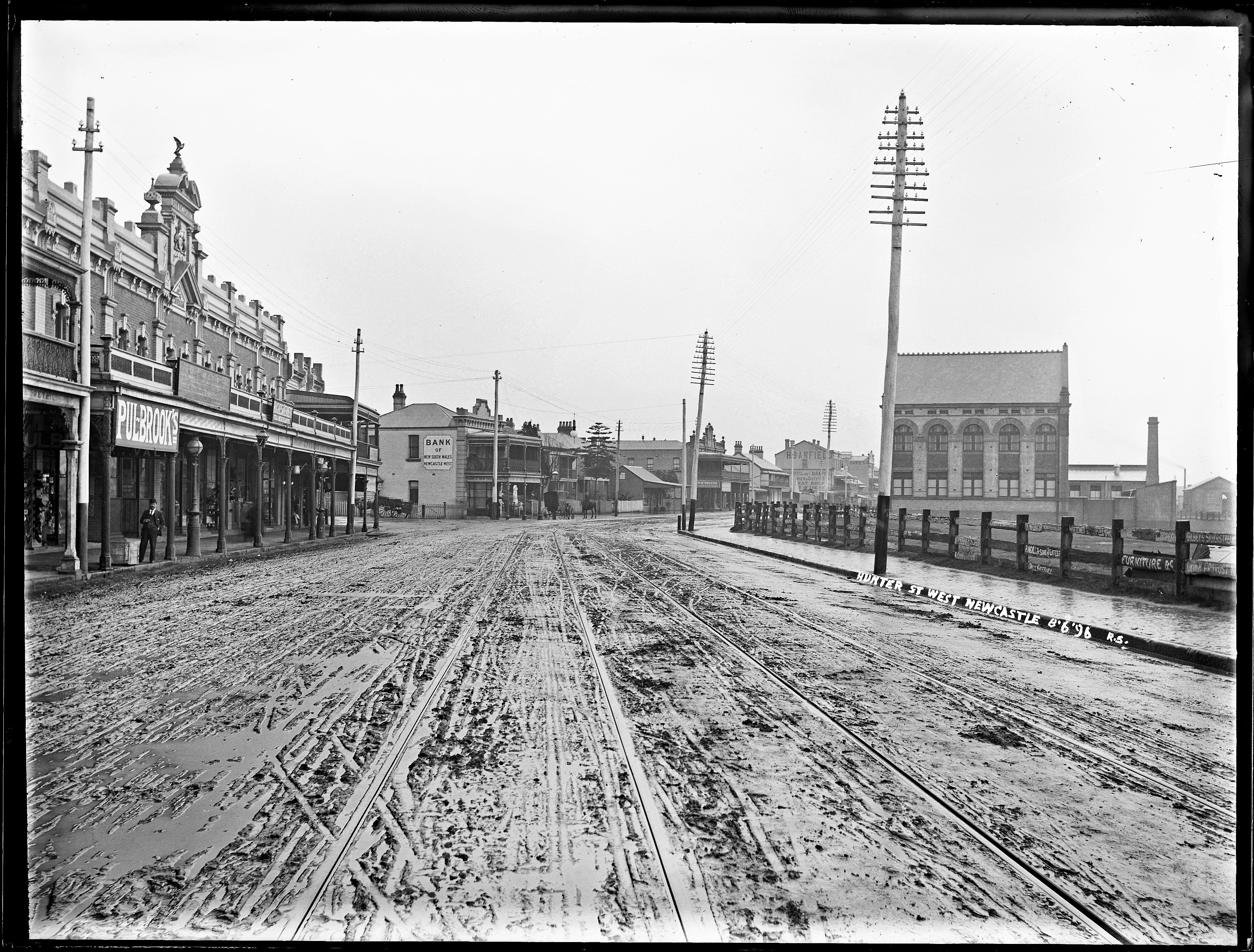
Looking west, Hunter and Union Streets, Newcastle, NSW, 8 June 1896

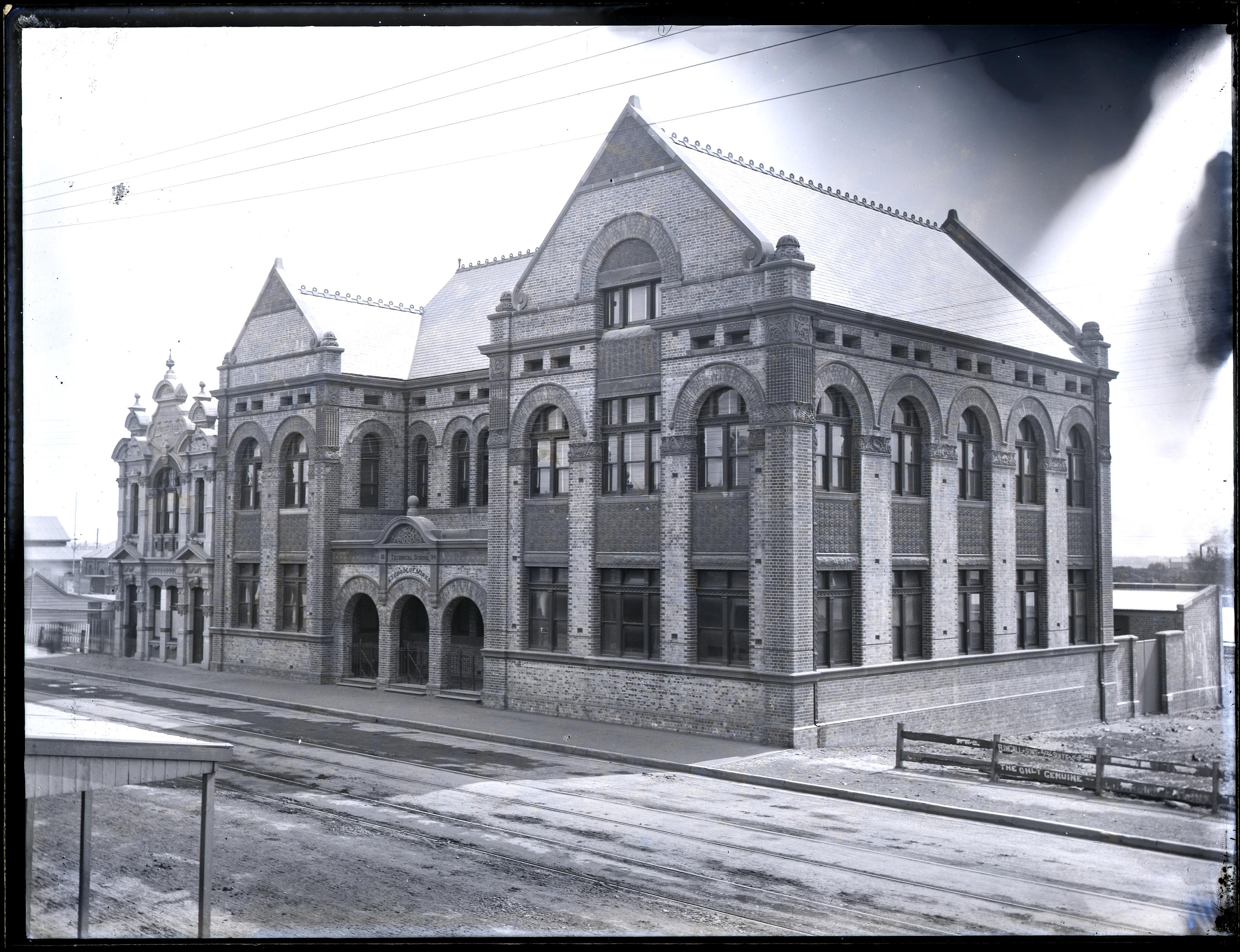
Technical College, Hunter Street, Newcastle, NSW, 29 August 1895

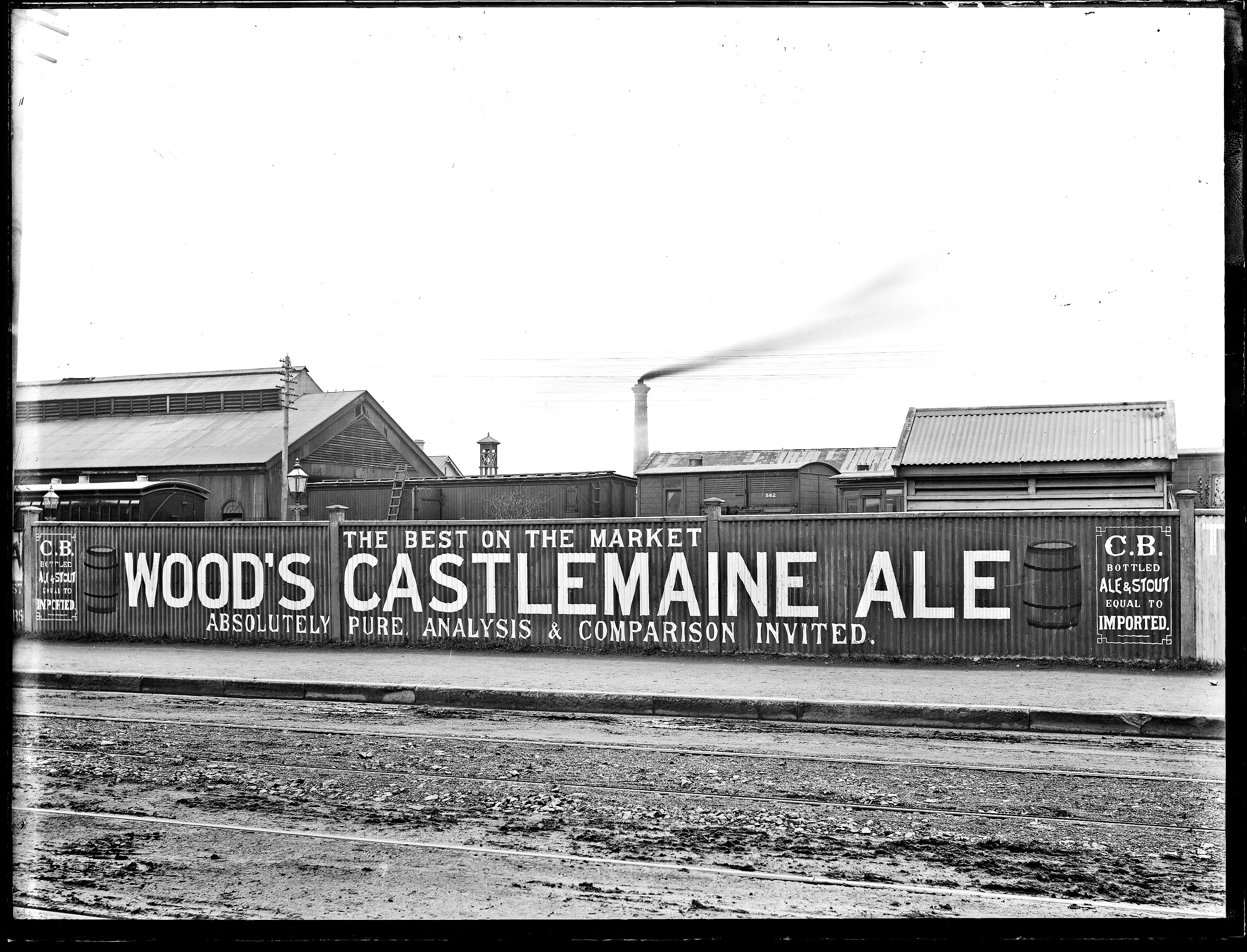
Woods Castlemaine Ale advertisement, Hunter Street, Newcastle West, NSW, 24 June 1898

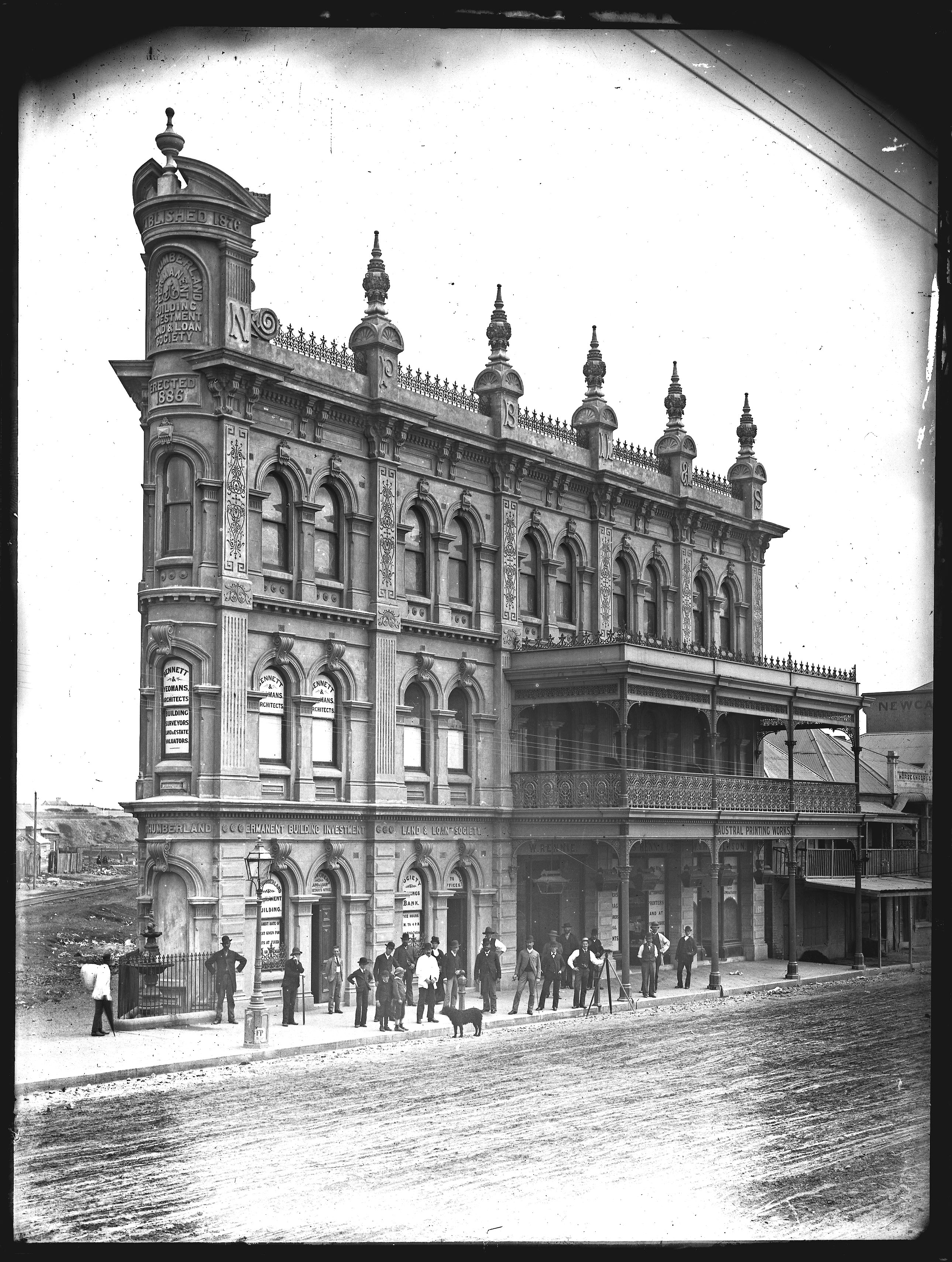
Northumberland Permanent Building and Investment Land and Loan Society Building, corner of Blane (now Hunter) and Burwood Streets, Newcastle, NSW, 1887. (Now demolished). site of current Newcastle Local Courthouse.

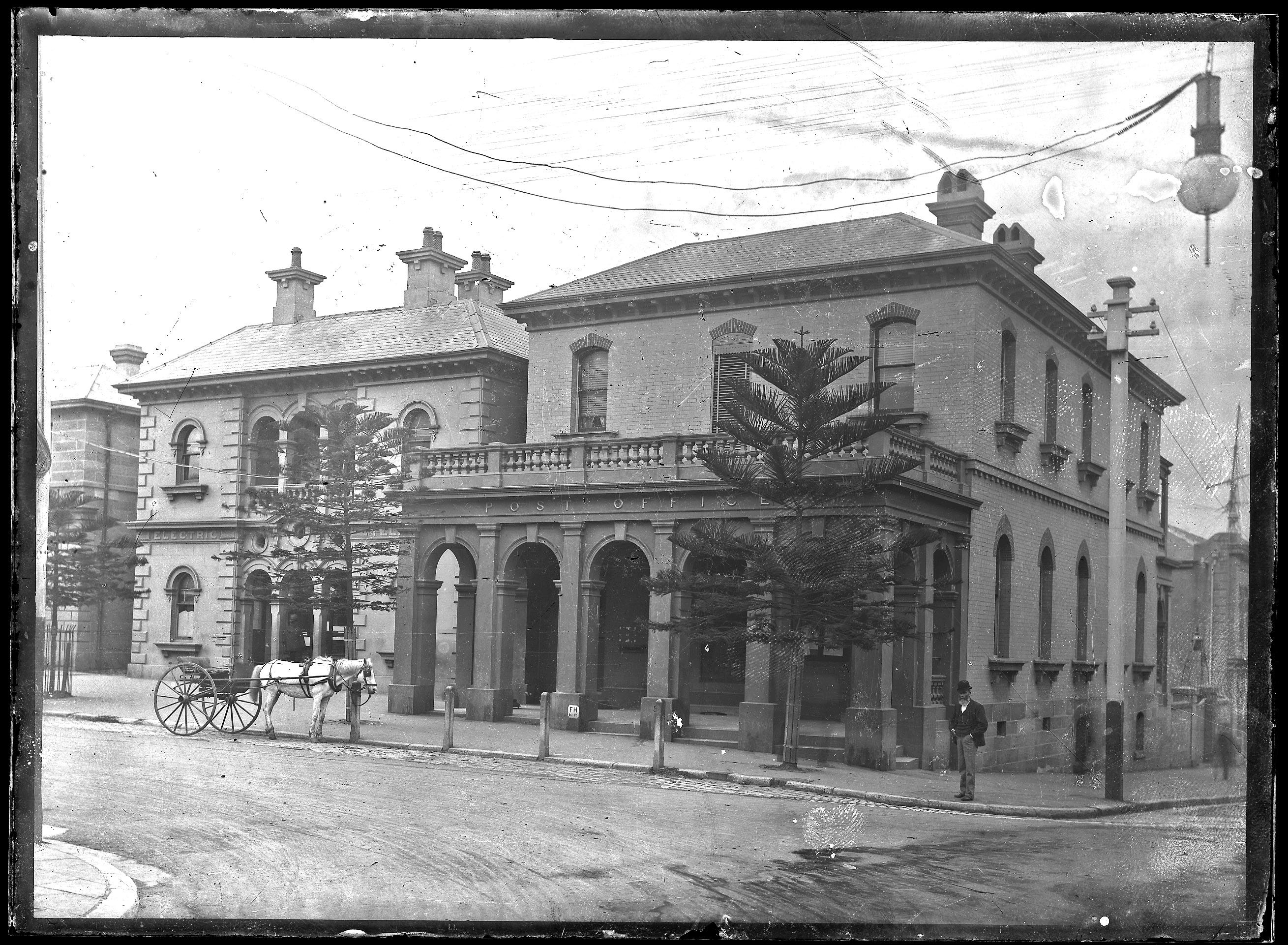
Newcastle Post and Telegraph Office, Hunter and Watt Street, Newcastle, NSW
