= Trampled – The Elefant Traks Remix Album =

Trampled - The Elefant Traks Remix Album

Compilation album by Various Artists
- Released: 1 August 2006
- Recorded: Elefant Mansion
- Genre: Australian hip hop
- Length: 68:00
- Label: Elefant Traks
- Producer: The Herd, Ozi Batla, Sulo, Traksewt, Unkle Ho

Various Artists chronology
The Sun Never Sets (2005)	Trampled - The Elefant Traks Remix Album (2006)	Summerland (2008)

Trampled – The Elefant Traks Remix Album by various artists is the first compilation remix album via Australian hip hop label, Elefant Traks, and was released in August 2006. The label's artists remixed tracks by fellow label mates from the previous eight years.

The album was released as an 18-track CD, with three tracks from the CD also featuring on a limited edition 7-track vinyl 12" bonus disc, together with four additional remix tracks, by Astronomy Class, F&d (Mnemonic Ascent), Fame and Pasobionic.

On the album Plutonic Lab remixes Hermitude, who in turn remix The Herd. The Herd members such as Sulo, Unkle Ho, Traksewt and Urthboy remix the likes of TZU, Sparrow Hill and Waiting for Guinness. Co-nominees of Triple J's inaugural J Award Pivot recondition The Herd, as do Curse Ov Dialect and Combat Wombat. Count Bounce and Yerock (TZU) overhaul Urthboy, and "I Was Only 19" is remixed by UK folktronica act Tunng.

In addition, the album version of The Herd's cover of "I Was Only 19" featuring John Schumann is included, fulfilling the promise to core fans who had bought The Sun Never Sets album before it was re-released with the track.

== Track listing (CD release) ==
1. "No Disclaimers" (Curse Ov Dialect Remix) - The Herd
2. "The Show" (Unkle Ho 'Afterparty' Remix) - Waiting For Guinness
3. "Music from the Mind" (Unkle Ho 'Dubstretch' Remix) - Hermitude
4. "Ray of Sun" (Sulo Remix) - The Herd
5. "Keep it Relevant" (Yerock Remix) - Urthboy
6. "Nightfall's Messenger" (Plutonic Lab Remix) - Hermitude
7. "Recoil" (Traksewt Remix) - TZU
8. "Take My Hand" (Urthboy 'Where I Live' Remix feat. Toe-Fu & Jane Tyrrell) - Gauche
9. "The Locust" (Sulo Remix) - Sparrow Hill
10. "Slavgnostik" (Hermitude Remix) - Unkle Ho
11. "The Last Chance" (Count Bounce Remix) - Urthboy
12. "Corruption Dub (Chasm 'Corruption Bounce' Remix feat. The Tongue) - Combat Wombat
13. "Apocalypta" (Monkey Marc Remix) - The Herd
14. "Can't Breathe" (Hermitude Remix) - The Herd
15. "The Metres Gained" (Pivot 'Gallipoli' Remix) - The Herd
16. "I was only 19" (Tunng Remix) - The Herd
17. "A Formidable Marinade" (Unkle Ho 'Ho Hop' Remix) - Mikelangelo and the Black Sea Gentlemen
18. "I Was Only 19" (feat John Schumann) - The Herd

== Track listing (Vinyl EP) ==
1. "No Disclaimers (Curse Ov Dialect Remix) - The Herd
2. "Ruffwon" (Pasobionic Remix) - Hermitude
3. "Nightfall's Messenger" (Plutonic Lab Remix) - Hermitude
4. "Can't Breathe" (Hermitude Remix)- The Herd
5. "Effortless" feat. Braintax (F&d Remix) - The Herd
6. "Burn Down the Parliament" (Astronomy Class Version) - The Herd
7. "Qwest" (Fame Remix) - Combat Wombat
