= Octapod =

Australian arts organisation

Octapod is a non profit arts organisation based in Newcastle, New South Wales, Australia. It acts as a producer and facilitator of creative projects in the Hunter region.

== History ==
Octapod was founded as an informal collective in 1996 by 'a group of artists and students who liked the idea of a public access media space - where people could create and browse interesting and unusual, non-mainstream media' (Healy, 2005). It was formally incorporated in 1997. Founders included Damien Frost, Sean Healy, Aaron Bristow and Marcus Westbury. Initially known as The POD ( and officially registered as 'The Platypus Of Deliverance Association' - which won the debate against 'the Prince of Darkness Association'), the change of name came as a result of threatened legal action in 1997. Octapod was conceived as an incubator and a common infrastructure for a variety of independent projects. Octapod operated as a volunteer-run and project-based organisation until 2004, when it took on paid staff as the result of increased funding.

Most notably Octapod is responsible for overseeing the management of Newcastle's annual This Is Not Art Festival and the festivals that it incorporates under its umbrella including the National Young Writers' Festival, Crack Theatre Festival, Critical Animals and other special events.

In 2000, Octapod received considerably international attention when IDG books threatened the organisation with legal action over the use of the term "for dummiez" in an online screenprinting guide. Members of Octapod responded by posting the correspondence from the company on an Octapod website Corporate Standover Tactics For Dummies.

== Current projects ==
- This Is Not Art Festival
- Culturehunter - online arts portal
- Access Program - a range of initiatives that connect arts and disability across the Hunter
- PODspace Gallery - an artist run gallery - currently experimenting with pop up style exhibitions

== Past projects ==
- Newcastle Fringe Festival ( 1998, 1999 )
- 101 Bikes for Newcastle (bicycle recycling campaign)
- The New Pollution (Australian zine anthology book and web site)
- Evolver (web site)
- Virtual Newcastle - a photographic 'click and wander' tour of Newcastle.
- h2w2 (guidebook)
- Corporate Standover Tactics For Dummies

Urchin magazine, a creative and design repository
