= Combat Wombat =

Australian hip-hop group

- Origin: Melbourne, Victoria, Australia
- Genre: Hip hop
- Years active: 2000–present
- Label: Elefant Traks
- Members: Marc Peckham (a.k.a. Monkey Marc); Tom Jones (a.k.a. DJ Wasabi); Marlon Ray G. Porter (a.k.a. Elf Tranzporter); Izzy Brown (a.k.a. MC Izzy)
- Website: Official webpage

Combat Wombat are an Australian hip-hop group from Melbourne. The group comprises Monkey Marc, DJ Wasabi, Elf Tranzporter and MC Izzy.

== History ==
The band's name came about because they used to drive around in a camouflage painted van that looked like a giant wombat.

...one day whilst we were touring around the desert with our solar powered sound system (Labrats) my mate Rufus said why don't you call your band Combat Wombat... so we did.

— Monkey Marc

Monkey Marc met Izzy in Darwin in 1998 where they started up a solar powered party political sound system.

She had this whole solar-powered sound system that she had hooked-up to this old quad-bike, a four-wheeled pedal bicycle. It was basically pedal and solar-powered. I arrived with my decks and my mixer, a sampler and an 808 drum machine, and that was kind of the start of Lab Rats and Combat Wombat

— Monkey Marc

Elf joined the band in 2000 after they all met whilst living together in a squat in the heart of Sydney.

The squat lasted two-and-a-half years. It was the venue of many benefit parties for the forests, land rights and Lake Cowal. It had alternative movie nights, dumpster picnics and many thriving underground and grass-roots gatherings

— MC Izzy

We had this warehouse out the back that became known as the Pigeon Poo Palace, and that's where we started jamming with Elf Tranzporter. We were doing heaps of free parties and Reclaim The Streets parties at the time. So he'd just rock up and start doing some rhymes, and we just started up this friendship

— Monky Marc

DJ Wasabi joined the band in 2002. Their first real performance as Combat Wombat was on a Channel Seven music program

Of course, it was heavily censored. The song was about four-and-a-half minutes long, but by the time Channel Seven got hold of it and cut up the footage of us performing live, they chopped it down to about a minute-and-a-half. They'd taken everything out of it, you know, there were lines about Nike exploitation of workers, Shell drilling hell and none of that was in there. But they left in the stuff about cops selling smack and stuff). It seemed fairly obvious who the program sponsors were.

— Monkey Marc

This led to the release of the band's debut album, Labrats Solar Powered Sound System, and their subsequent signing to Elefant Traks. The band released its second album, Unsound $ystem, in March 2005. Within a week of its release, Unsound $ystem was receiving airplay on Triple J, with the single, "Qwest" reaching No. 2 on the Net 50. Unsound $ystem features a number of guests artists such as The Herd's Ozi Batla and TZU's Seed MC, but the most confronting cameos are from MCG and SMS: two Afghan refugees who had escaped from Woomera detention centre.

We knew these guys from Woomera and bumped into them and invited them in to record. I played them a song, an emotive arrangement of gypsy strings, and they just tried to write whatever they could. They had never rapped and wanted to know what this song was about. I said, 'Displaced people.' They wrote this rhyme in Persian that was pretty much like, 'Why has God forgotten us? Why are we the forgotten people?' They were beautiful guys and we recorded it in an hour and took them out for pizza. Unfortunately they were locked up and sent to Baxter.

— Monkey Marc

== Members ==
=== Monkey Marc ===
Marc Peckham (a.k.a. Monkey Marc) was born in Cardiff, Wales and moved to Australia in 1986. Peckham has been writing music since he was 11 and has been making electronic music with real gear since 1996.his first solo album of 52 songs that was lost in a house fire in 1994. He wrote and produced Combat Wombat's two albums and has been involved in numerous other projects. He has recently built a solar and wind powered recording studio in Melbourne at Abbotsford Convent. He spends six months of the year working on Aboriginal communities producing indigenous music.

=== MC Izzy ===
Izzy Brown (a.k.a. MC Izzy) grew up with one parent working for ASIO and subsequently the family moved home consistently, running away from home at age 16.

I grew up amid the daily intrigue of espionage within the Australian secret intelligence agencies. These insights and other visions of a well-travelled childhood, along with what we're witnessing in today's world, prompted us to express thoughts and feelings in a creative way.

— MC Izzy

Brown is a hip hop artist and film maker from Melbourne Australia. Izzy has toured extensively in Australia, Europe, Palestine and Africa for over a decade. She is the founder of United Struggle Project, recording music and making film clips with artists in refugee camps, slums and prisons.

Brown has been involved in the Sonic Boom collective of artists as a Youth Workshop facilitator working on remote Aboriginal communities in the central and western desert in Australia and Palm Island. Since 2000 she has conducted workshops on music, hip hop lyric writing, theatre, circus and film production working with 'youth at risk' and disadvantaged youth.

Brown has created three feature-length documentaries, GhettoMoto, Voices from the Ghetto, Too Deadly, as well as numerous other short films and music videos.

Izzy was co-founder of Labrats solar-powered sound system and wind-powered cinema that toured Australia in a vegetable oil-powered van from 1997 to 2003.

=== DJ Wasabi ===
DJ Wasabi (a.k.a. Tom Jones) was born in Matong, New South Wales in 1985. At 18, Wasabi set up his own label, Fortknight Productions, under which he has produced five albums. Wasabi first played with Combat Wombat when they were doing a free party in Newcastle, New South Wales in 2000, but didn't officially join the group until 2002. In 2004 he was invited to remix "Waltzing Matilda" for comic outfit Scared Weird Little Guys and subsequently performed with the trio at the Melbourne Comedy Festival National Telethon. Wasabi was an ARIA award winner in 2004 for his turntable work on the Scared Weird Little Guys' album, Bits and Pieces. He performs with and writes music for several bands including Bad Boys Batucada, and Fortknight. He also performs in groups around Melbourne including Phat Logic and is resident DJ at Big Mouth in St Kilda.

=== Elf Tranzporter ===
Marlon Porter (a.k.a. Elf Tranzporter) was born in Los Angeles and emigrated to Australia in 1991. Porter was one of the founding members of early underground Australian hip-hop collective Metabass'n'Breath. He is also an 'offshore' member of San Francisco group Heavyweight Dub Champion. In addition to the above duties, he's also shared the stage with the likes of Allen Ginsberg, Jurassic 5 and Grand Wizard Theodore, whilst also playing a crucial role in the development of Melbourne-based acts such as True Live and Red Eyes.

== Discography ==
=== Albums ===
- Labrats Solar Powered Sound System – Independent (2000)
- Unsound $ystem – Elefant Traks/Inertia Records (14 March 2005)
- Taking Bass Bins Hostage – [Maloka Records] (8 Oct 2010) Split Release with Cop on Fire
- Just Across The Border – Independent (2017)

=== Singles ===
- "Miraculous Activist" (2001) (12")
- "Qwest" (2005) (featuring Seed MC)
- "Police Brutality" (2006)

=== Solo releases ===
==== Monkey Marc ====
- Western Desert Mob – Independent
- "Combat Wombat – Unsound System" – (Elefant Traks)(2005)
- "Apocalypta" (Monkey Marc remix) on Trampled: The Elefant Traks Remix Album – Elefant Traks (2006)
- "Seven Guns and Seven Holes" (DJ $olal remix) – Ya Basta Records (2008)
- "All things Must Come to an End" – Monkeymarc – (Omelette Records)(2008)
- "Istanbul Engloutie " (Rafiralfiro remix) – Fresh Poulp Records (2009)
- "La Multi Ani" – DJ Click (Monkeymarc remix) – (No Fridge Records)(2010)
- "As The Market Crashed" – Omelette Records (1 December 2009)
- "Red Sand Culture" – Compilation by InCite Youth Arts and the Mt Theo Program (Oct 2011)
- "Who Goes There?" – Roots Manuva from the album "4everevolution" (NinjaTune/BigDada)(Sept 2011)
- "Voice of Dissent" – Soom T & Monkey Marc (single)(Renegade Masters)(Jan 2012)
- "Head Right" – Joelistics (Monkeymarc Remix)(Elefant Traks)(March 2012)
- "Rudebwoy Dub" – Jahrarian Dubbers Vol. 3 (Jahtari Records)(April 2012)
- "Red Sand Culture Vol. 2 (Compilation by InCite Youth Arts and the Mt Theo Program (2012)
- "Monkey Marc vs The Planet Smashers (Jahtarti Records)(Feb 2013)
- "Phone Baje Na -The Bombay Royal Remix (Hope St Recordings 30 June 2013)

==== Elf Tranzporter ====
- Ethereal Lotus Fleet – Method/Shock Records (2008)
