= Kenny Sabir =

- Also known as: Traksewt
- Born: Kenneth Spencer Sabir ca. 1975; Sydney, New South Wales, Australia
- Genres: Hip hop
- Years active: 1998–present
- Label: Elefant Traks
- Member of: The Herd

Kenneth Spencer Sabir (born ca. 1975), is an Australian musician, computer programmer, record label founder and event organiser. In 1998 Sabir co-founded an independent record label, Elefant Traks. In 2001, he founded the hip-hop collective The Herd along with fellow Elefant Traks manager Urthboy, Australian MCs Ozi Batla and Berzerkatron, fellow producers Sulo, Unkle Ho, guitarist Toe-Fu and bassist Rok Poshyta. As of August 2011, The Herd have released five studio albums including Summerland (2008) which peaked at No. 7 on the ARIA Albums Chart and Future Shade (2011) which reached the top 30.

Sabir is a co-founder and former manager of the Sound Summit, an independent electronic record labels conference in Newcastle, as part of the annual This Is Not Art Festival. He was involved in the development and founding of the annual Freeplay Independent Games Festival. Sabir is a computer programmer, in 2000 he developed the DASE (Distributed Audio SEquencer) which allowed musicians to jam in near real time over the internet. He was a contributor to the development of the Open Source OGRE Engine (Object-Oriented Graphics Rendering Engine).

== Biography ==
Kenneth Spencer Sabir was born in about 1975 and grew up in Sydney. Sabir started music lessons at the age of four, initially on a quarter-sized violin, followed by piano at six years old. Later he learned various instruments including accordion, clarinet, drums and guitar. He attended Cherrybrook Technology High School. After leaving school he played drums in a lo-fi rock band for a couple of years and studied a Bachelor of Computer Engineering at University of Technology, Sydney.

While performing with his rock band, he became "frustrated though because I wasn't getting any input into the creative process, things like melody and chords so I thought 'hey, I can do all this myself'". In 1998 Sabir founded the record label, Elefant Traks. One of the first releases on the label was by Richard Tamplenizza (a.k.a. Sulo.) He enlisted friends to help with running the label including Tim Levinson (a.k.a. Urthboy). In 2000 he co-founded, with Sebastian Chan and Marcus Westbury, the Sound Summit, an independent electronic record labels conference in Newcastle, as part of the annual This Is Not Art Festival. After the festival, with other attendees, Sabir tried collaborating on songwriting "that was me and Shannon [Kennedy] (Ozi Batla) at first. We sold the idea to a lot of artists we respected. We all shipped up our studio gear, computers and keyboards into a holiday house up there, and that’s how we started recording". That same year Sabir developed the DASE (Distributed Audio Sequencer) which allowed musicians to jam in near real time over the internet. With a collective, Dase Team 5000, he demonstrated the software at the Australasian Computer Music Conference.

In 2001 Sabir, as Traksewt (on piano, accordion, clarinet, and beats), was a founding member of The Herd in Sydney as an Australian hip hop and rap group. Other founders were Urthboy, Ozi Batla, and Berzerkatron (Simon Fellows) as MCs; Rok Poshtya (Dale Harrison) on bass guitar; Sulo on beats and guitar; Toe Fu (Byron Williams) on guitar; and Unkle Ho (Kaho Cheung) on beats. As of August 2011, The Herd have released five studio albums including, Summerland (2008), which peaked at No. 7 on the ARIA Albums Chart and Future Shade (2011) which reached the top 30. Kenny wrote the music and produced four songs from Future Shade including one of the singles 'A Thousand Lives' that was a finalist in the International Songwriting Competition 2011, where it received an honourable mention.
