= Sound Summit =

Music festival

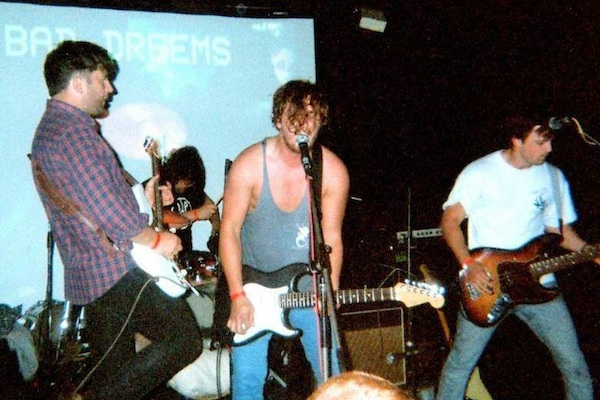
- Genre: Electronic music,
- Locations: Newcastle, New South Wales, Australia
- Years active: 2000-present
- Website: Sound Summit website

Sound Summit is an annual independent conference / festival focusing on exploratory and innovative independent music that takes place in Newcastle, New South Wales, Australia as part of the annual This Is Not Art Festival. It was founded in 2000 by Sebastian Chan, Kenny Sabir and Marcus Westbury and evolved in part from the involvement of musicians in the Electrofringe festival that took place in Newcastle at that time.

Sound Summit exists to support the development of independent in Australia. It typically consists of a series of artist development workshops examining production techniques, mastering, and sound manipulation and a focus on business development covering licensing, royalties, label management, and promotion focusing specifically on the needs of independent labels and independent artists.

== See also ==
- List of electronic music festivals
