= CTHS =

The abbreviation CTHS may refer to:

- Cherokee Trail High School in Aurora, Colorado, USA
- Cherrybrook Technology High School in Cherrybrook, New South Wales, Australia
- Canadian Thoroughbred Horse Society, national horse breeding organization
- Comité des travaux historiques et scientifiques, a French learned society
- Cass Technical High School in Detroit, Michigan, USA
