= NYWF =

NYWF may refer to:

- National Young Writers' Festival, occurs annually in the city of Newcastle, New South Wales, Australia
- The New York Women's Foundation, a charitable organization in New York based on the well-being of women and girls
- 1939 New York World's Fair
