= Dangar Grid =

Business district layout in Newcastle, Australia

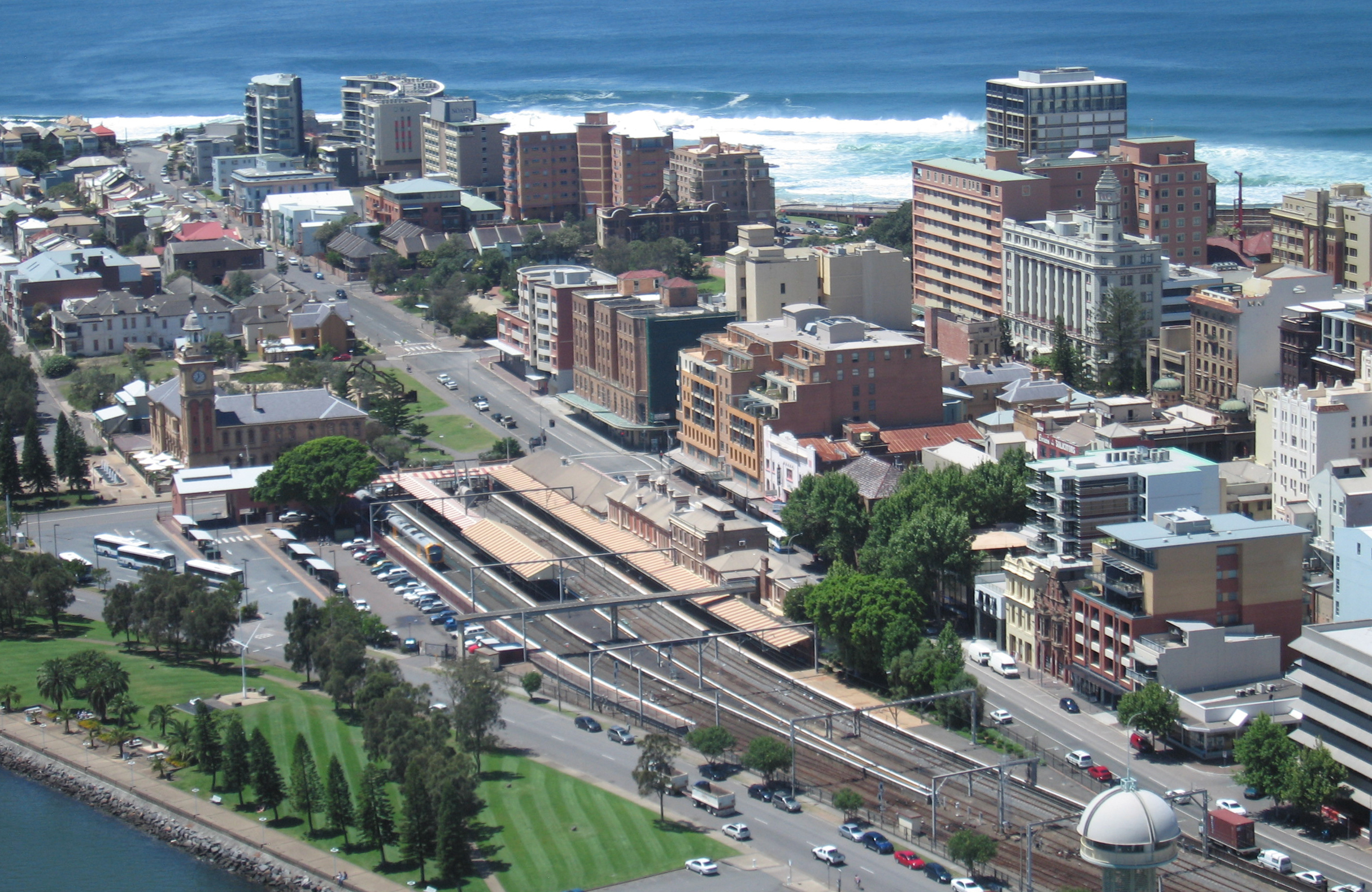
Newcastle's East End in 2008, the buildings at right are within Dangar's Grid, designed in 1823

An electric tram halts on Hunter Street, the northern boundary of Dangar's Grid

The Dangar Grid is the layout of the streets in the centre of the central business district of Newcastle, Australia. Named after its designer, Henry Dangar, the Grid was designed in 1823 and implemented sometime thereafter. It covers the area from Brown Street to Pacific Street, and from Church Street to Hunter Street.

== History ==
Newcastle was in a state of decline when Governor Lachlan Macquarie commissioned Government Surveyor Henry Dangar to design a compact town plan for the city. This enabled Dangar to reinvent the colony's second-oldest settlement, providing it with a structural heart that still functions as Newcastle's central business district. When Governor Macquarie opened up the Hunter Valley for settlement he preserved Dangar's Grid by giving the newly formed Australian Agricultural Company 810 ha (2,002 acres) of land immediately west of Brown Street (now the Civic precinct and Newcastle West), preventing Newcastle from spreading westward until 1837. In the meantime, the city grew southward on a plateau.

Dangar's Grid is unique in that it is situated on sloping ground between Christ Church Cathedral and the harbour. Rather than take advantage of the aforementioned plateau that is now The Hill, Dangar's Grid is "hill-draped between ocean and estuary", creating what Elizabeth Farrelly, the Sydney-based architecture critic, has described as "one of the country's – maybe the world's – most spectacularly sited towns".

== Street names ==
=== South-North streets ===
- Brown Street, named after Alexander Brown, Colliery Manager of the Australian Agricultural Company
- Perkin Street (now Perkins Street), named after Jacob Perkin, engineer
- Wolffe Street, then Woolf Street (now Wolfe Street), named after Arthur Woolf, engineer
- Newcomen Street named after Thomas Newcomen, mechanic
- Boulton Street (now Bolton Street) named after Matthew Boulton, engineer
- Watt Street (first street in Newcastle, originally called High Street) renamed after James Watt, engineer
- Pacific Street, overlooking the Pacific Ocean

=== West-East streets ===
- Hunter Street, named after the Hunter River, along which it runs parallel
- King Street, named after the NSW Governor, Captain Philip Gidley King
- Church Street is in reference to the original Christ Church (now Cathedral), built in 1817
