= Not Quite Art =

- Not Quite Art Title logo
- Genre: Documentary
- Created by: Marcus Westbury
- Presented by: Marcus Westbury
- Narrated by: Marcus Westbury
- Country of origin: Australia
- Original language: English
- No. of series: 2
- No. of episodes: 6

Production
- Running time: 30 minutes

Original release
- Release: October 2007

Not Quite Art is an Australian TV series that documents the many media of present-day art and culture in Australia. Two series of the series have been produced and aired on ABC1, both with 3 episodes each, the second series also aired on ABC2. The series is created and hosted by Marcus Westbury.

== Episodes ==
Two series of Not Quite Art have been produced. Series 1 aired in October 2007 and featured 3 episodes, these were aired on Tuesdays at 10pm. A second series was subsequently produced and aired in October 2008, also featuring 3 episodes, these were also aired on Tuesdays at 10pm.

=== Series 1 (2007) ===
#	Title	Air date	Synopsis
101	Icons & Opportunities	October 2007	Explores the current state of art in contemporary society and culture. Explores street art and DIY music performances.
102	The New Folk Art	October 2007	???
103	The Business of Culture	October 2007	???

=== Series 2 (2008) ===
#	Title	Air date	Synopsis
201	Culture Shock	14 October 2008	???
202	Unpopular Culture	21 October 2008	???
203	DIY Museums	28 October 2008	Explores the role of traditional cultural institutions like museums and art galleries in present-day culture.

== Critical response ==
Not Quite Art has been accepted to favourable reviews and critical acclaim. An article in The Age Newspaper explained; "Not Quite Art is the freshest, most illuminating, thoughtful and funny locally made arts program in years."

== External resources ==
- The Age, Green Guide, Article, October 2008.
- Official Website
