= The Herd (The Herd album) =

Studio album by The Herd
- Released: 1 September 2001
- Genre: Australian hip hop
- Length: 65:58
- Label: Elefant Traks
- Producer: The Herd

The Herd chronology
| The Herd (2001) | An Elefant Never Forgets (2003) |

The Herd is the self-titled debut album from the Australian hip hop band, The Herd.

The album reached number 2 in the AIR independent electronic charts, and remained in the independent AIR charts top 10 for seven months. The group's debut single, "Scallops" stayed in Triple J's Net 50 for 22 weeks.

== Track listing ==
1. "Scallops" – 4:51
2. "Lurque" – 4:05
3. "Symbioses" – 3:20
4. "Royal Jelly" – 3:56
5. "Dase'n" – 5:15
6. "Hello Boys" – 3:24
7. "Hill Cats" – 5:51
8. "Manufactured" – 3:23
9. "Awaken" – 0:43
10. "Toronto" – 2:47
11. "X-Continental" – 4:10
12. "Ones and Zeros" – 4:30
13. "Too Late" – 4:25
14. "Takin' Space" – 3:08
15. "Gutter Rats" – 1:08
16. "20 Leopards" – 3:36
17. "Sutherland Pickup" – 3:52
18. "Tricky Sleeves" – 3:44
