= National Young Writers' Festival =

Annual festival in Newcastle, New South Wales

The National Young Writers' Festival (NYWF) occurs annually in the city of Newcastle, New South Wales, Australia, over the New South Wales' Labour Day Holiday Weekend in late September/early October. It is the country's largest gathering of young and innovative writers working in both new and traditional forms including zines, comics, blogging, screenwriting, poetry, spoken word, hip hop music, journalism, autobiography, comedy, songwriting and prose.

NYWF presents 'writing' in its broadest sense through panels, discussions, workshops, launches, performances and readings. NYWF gives young writers a place to present their work and share ideas, to learn about the industry in which they write and to meet with like-minded people.

The festival's current lead artistic director is Tina Huang. The festival's previous directors include Lex Hirst (2014 - 2015), Alexandra Neill (2014 - 2015), Jessica Alice (2014 - 2015) and Sian Campbell (2015 - 2016).

== History ==
The National Young Writers Festival was founded as an independent festival in 1998. The founders included Marcus Westbury and Sean Healy, who were associated with the Octapod Association - a Newcastle, New South Wales based arts and media organisation. In 2000 the National Young Writers' Festival became a key part of a broader coalition of arts and media festivals known as This Is Not Art, held in the city over the same weekend.

The 23rd went virtual in 2020.

Due to difficulties, the 2024 festival was cancelled, and it returned in 2025.

== Past Guests ==
The 2007 festival featured poets Judith Beveridge and Andy Jackson. The 2008 festival featured poets Sam Byfield, Ella Holcombe and Geoff Lemon. The 2012 festival featured international guest Christian Lander, author of Stuff White People Like. The 2023 Special Guest was Anwen Crawford.

== See also ==
- List of festivals in Australia
