= An Elefant Never Forgets =

Studio album by The Herd
- Released: 10 February 2003
- Genre: Australian hip hop
- Length: 65:55
- Label: Elefant Traks
- Producer: The Herd

The Herd chronology
| The Herd (2001) | An Elefant Never Forgets (2003) | The Sun Never Sets (2005) |

Singles from An Elefant Never Forgets
- 1. "Burn Down The Parliament" Released: January 2003; 2. "77%" Released: 2003

An Elefant Never Forgets is the second album by Australian hip hop band The Herd, released 10 February 2003.

The first single released from the album, "Burn Down the Parliament", was meant to be interpreted metaphorically, but coincidentally was released the same week as the devastating Canberra bushfires in 2003.

The second track released, "77%", featured the line "77% of Aussies are racist", referring to the number of Australians announced in a survey that agreed with the Australian federal government's response to the Tampa affair, and also directly attacked the perceived racism of a number of Australian radio talkback hosts, caused a small stir which gained the track more publicity.

"77%" scored well on the Triple J Hottest 100 of 2003, coming in at #46.

== Track listing ==
1. "The Plunderers" – 4:01
2. "States of Transit" – 4:03
3. "Burn Down The Parliament" – 3:53
4. "Superweeds" – 4:03
5. "Urban Lady Saloon" – 3:05
6. "77%" – 4:18
7. "Hunter's Theme" – 5:20
8. "The After Party Brigade" – 3:02
9. "The World Keeps Turning" – 4:32
10. "Hell" – 4:03
11. "When You Thought Nothing Was Happening" – 3:09
12. "Croissant Para Zwei Na Cvrtek" – 4:59
13. "High Seas" – 4:15
14. "LG" – 5:23
15. "Taki Taki" – 4:22
16. "Ray of Sun" – 3:27
