= Jenny Blundell =

Australian athlete (born 1994)

Personal information
- Nationality: Australian
- Born: 9 May 1994 (age 32) Sydney, Australia
- Height: 163 cm (5 ft 4 in)
- Weight: 49 kg (108 lb)

Sport
- Country: Australia
- Sport: Track and field
- Event: Middle-distance running
Medal record
Women's athletics
Representing AUS
Oceania Championships
Gold medal – first place	2024 Suva	5000 m

Jenny Blundell (born 9 May 1994) is an Australian athlete who specialises in the middle-distance running.

== Early years ==
Blundell started in Little Athletics in the Under sixes at Cherrybrook in Sydney. She regularly broke state records. At 15, she won the national under-20 800m title. Blundell managed to secure selection for the inaugural Youth Olympic Games in 2010.. Here she was placed fifth in the 800m and fourth in the medley relay. In 2011 she got to the semi-finals at the World Youth (U18) Championships.

The following year she was selected in the 1500m for the World Juniors (U20) Championships. Back in Australia she won the national junior cross country title.

== Achievements ==
Blundell qualified for the 2016 Summer Olympics where she reached the semi-final in the 1500 metres and placed 24th in Tokyo Olympics 5000 meters. After recovering from injury, she returned in early 2020 in a new event, the 5000m. Blundell ran a personal best 15:22.14 in the national championship, a 32-second PB in the event.

Blundell then ran a 4:07.71 1500m at the Zatopek in Melbourne. (Named after Emil Zatopek, the Czech long-distance runner, it is the most prestigious track race in Australia). She then competed in the national 5000m title in March, 2021 and two solo runs 8:56.17 (3000m) and 15:10.27 (5000m). These results secured her selection for her second Olympic games.

At the 2020 Olympics she came 11th in her 5000m heat with a time of 15:11.27. She was therefore eliminated.

Blundell currently attends the University of Sydney after graduating from Cherrybrook Technology High School. She is coached by James Fitzgerald.

== Personal bests ==
Event	Record	Venue	Date
800 metres	2:03.71	Adelaide	20 February 2016
1000 metres	2:45.68	Sydney	12 March 2010
1500 metres	4:04.62	Beijing	18 May 2016
One mile run	4:36.5	Sydney	16 December 2014
