= Elf Tranzporter =

- Born: Marlon Porter
- Genre: Hip-hop
- Occupation: Rapper
- Label: Shock

Marlon Porter, known professionally as Elf Tranzporter, is an American-born Australian rapper. Originally from Los Angeles, he is now based in Melbourne, Australia. He was a founding member of Metabass'n'Breath and is now a part of Combat Wombat and San Francisco based Heavyweight Dub Champion. He released his debut solo album Ethereal Lotus Fleet in 2007. Elf Tranzporter has worked as an actor, appearing in the "a hip-hop morality play" DiaTribe, playing Death. Elf Tranzporter also works in remote Australian Aboriginal communities encouraging youth to get in touch with their inner MC.

== Discography ==
- Ethereal Lotus Fleet (2007) - Shock
