= The Sun Never Sets (album) =

Studio album by The Herd
- Released: 3 October 2005
- Recorded: Elefant Mansion
- Genre: Australian hip-hop
- Length: 68:00
- Label: Elefant Traks
- Producer: The Herd, Ozi Batla, Sulo, Traksewt, Unkle Ho

The Herd chronology
An Elefant Never Forgets (2003)	The Sun Never Sets (2005)	Summerland (2008)

Singles from The Sun Never Sets
- 1. "We Can't Hear You" Released: 2005; 2. "I Was Only 19" Released: 2005; 3. "Unpredictable" Released: 2006

The Sun Never Sets is the third album by Australian hip-hop band The Herd and was released on 3 October 2005.

The album was selected as the Triple J and 2SER 'Album of the Week' and was nominated for the inaugural Triple J - J Award for Australian Album of the year.

The album debuted at #3 on the AIR independent album charts.

In October 2005, The Herd performed a cover of Redgum's classic anti-war song "I Was Only 19" on Triple J's ‘Like a Version’ radio program. The song became one of the most heavily requested songs on the station. The Herd's version of "I Was Only 19" was voted in at #18 in the 2005 Triple J Hottest 100 playlist. It was credited to Schumann, Cheung, Fellows, Harrison and Kennedy. A video by Broken Yellow was directed by Brendan Doyle and produced by Navid Bahadori included actors in roles as Australian soldiers, some actual Vietnam Vets including Frankie Hunt are also shown. An audio mp3 download by Triple J's Hack has reporter Ali Benton discussing the video, interviewing Doyle, Schumann and Hunt.

At the J Award of 2005, the album was nominated for Australian Album of the Year.

In March 2006 the album was re-issued with the inclusion of "I Was Only Nineteen", with Redgum's John Schumann on vocals.

== Track listing ==
All tracks written by (Levinson, Cheung, Harrison, Fellows, Kennedy) unless otherwise indicated.

1. "Unpredictable" (Levinson, Kenny Sabir, Cheung, Harrison, Fellows, Kennedy) - 4:05
2. "Long Lunch" (Levinson, Harrison, Fellows, Kennedy) - 3:30
3. "National Holiday" (Sabir, Levinson, Harrison, Fellows, Kennedy)- 3:18
4. "We Can't Hear You" - 4:17
5. "Under Pressure" (Levinson, Harrison, Fellows, Kennedy, Williams) - 4:23
6. "Where Is Everyone" (R. Tamplenizza, Harrison) - 2:38
7. "Full Moon" - 4:37
8. "Apocalypta" (Sabir, Kennedy, Levinson, Fellows) - 5:30
9. "Can't Breathe" - 5:20
10. "Starship Troopers [Redux]" (Kennedy, Harrison) - 3:23
11. "Effortless" (Featuring Braintax) - 4:26
12. "Mischief" - 4:19
13. "No Disclaimers" (Sabir, Levinson, Cheung) - 3:37
14. "Breakfast Club" (Sabir, Levinson, Fellows, Kennedy, Harrison) - 5:57
15. "The Metres Gained" (Levinson, Kennedy, Johns, Sabir, Cheung) - 4:43
16. "I Was Only 19" (features on 2006 reissue) (Schumann, Cheung, Fellows, Harrison, Kennedy) - 4:54

== Charts ==
Charts (2005)	Peak position
Australian ARIA Albums Chart	69

== Personnel ==
=== The Herd ===
- Sulo - production, guitar
- Traksewt (Kenny Sabir) - production, accordion, clarinet
- Unkle Ho (Kaho Cheung) - production, guitar
- Bezerkatron (Simon Fellows) - vocals
- Ozi Batla (Shannon Kennedy) - vocals, production
- Urthboy (Tim Levinson) - vocals, production
- Rok Poshtya (Dale Harrison) - bass
- Toe-Fu (Byron Williams) - guitar, vocals
- Jane Tyrell - vocals

=== Additional musicians ===
- Braintax - vocals on "Effortless"
- Megan Drury - vocals on "National Holiday"
- Senator Jim - trumpet on "Effortless" and "No Disclaimers"
- Greg Crocetti - cello on "National Holiday" and "Apocalypta"
- Rory Toomey - percussion on "Long Lunch", "Full Moon", "Under Pressure" and "Mischief"
- Luke Dubs - keyboards on "Can't Breathe"
- Snapsuit - production on "The Metres Gained"
- Jason Whalley and Lindsay McDougall from Frenzal Rhomb - vocals on "Mischief"
- John Schumann - vocals and guitar on "I Was Only 19"
