= Metabass'n'Breath =

Australian hip hop crew

- Origin: Sydney, New South Wales, Australia
- Genres: Hip-hop
- Past members: Elf Tranzporter; Morganics; Baba Israel; Jason "Jay" Bondy; Adam "Sloth" Burrell; Nic Toth; Brotha Nei Cha; NDB Bass; The Architect of Rhythm; Spacecrafta

Metabass'n'Breath are an Australian hip-hop group from Sydney. The group were formed by Elf Tranzporter, Morganics and Baba Israel after they met while busking. They recorded two albums and toured America twice.

The group self-released their debut album, Seek in 1997 followed by several mix tapes, EPs and 12" singles culminating in the full-length release Life and Times of a Beatboxer.

== Discography ==
Albums

- Seek (1997) - Metaphysics
- Life and Times of a Beatboxer (1999) - Bomb Hip Hop
