= Newcastle and Suburban Co-operative Society =

Co-operative in Australia

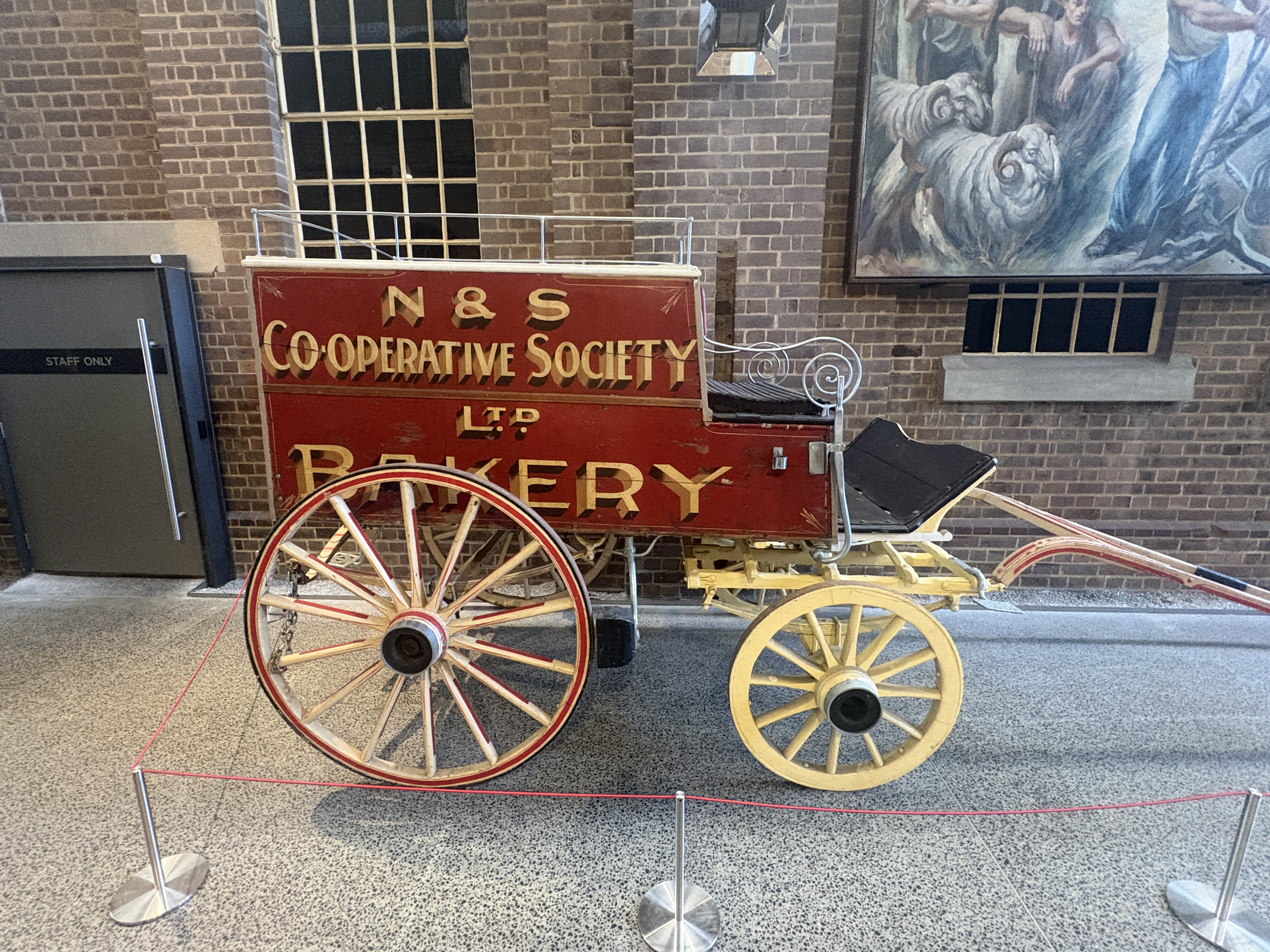
Horse-drawn wagon used to deliver bread for the Newcastle and Suburban Co-operative Society at the Newcastle Museum

The Newcastle and Suburban Co-operative Society, known locally as The Store, was a co-operative based in Newcastle, a city in New South Wales, Australia. The Store was described as "the largest and most successful co-operative society in the southern hemisphere".

The co-operative was established in 1898, based on a co-operative tradition brought from Britain by immigrant coal miners. At its peak, the Store had 98,000 members and employed 1,450 workers in 15 retail stores and 11 service station "food courts". As well as food and retail goods, services included "[a] health fund, funeral fund, travel agency, credit union and a barber shop." The Newcastle Herald states that in 1942, the Store was "reputed to have the largest bakery in Australia, making about 62,800 loaves a week".

Increased shopper mobility and competition from suburban shopping centres saw the Store wind up in 1981.

The Hunter Street Newcastle building had remained in a prominent place on the bend, intersection on Hunter Street, being used for markets, supermarket, and stores, until in 2015 NSW Government purchased the Hunter Street Newcastle building. Doma Group brought the building for $200 million. In 2021 it was demolished to make way for a new development.

== See also ==
- Rochdale Principles
