= Cherrybrook Technology High School =

Public school in New South Wales, Australia

Location
- 28-44 Purchase Road; Central-Southern Cherrybrook; Greater Sydney Hills and Hornsby Shire District; Cherrybrook, NSW, Hornsby Shire Council, New South Whales, 2126; Australia; 33°43′13″S 151°2′17″E

Information
- Type: NSW DoE Institution of Technology
- Motto: Achieving Together
- Religious affiliation: Christian Studies Available
- Established: 1992
- Founder: NSW Department of Education and Training
- Status: 35th Anniversary (2027)
- School district: Cherrybrook, Castle Hill, Dural Selected Area Catchments
- General Principal: Mr. Matthew Townsend
- Deputy Principal: Mr. Brett Clements
- Deputy Principal: Ms. Alison Gatt
- Deputy Principal: Mr. Matthew Fisher
- Deputy Principal: Ms. Rebecca Donohue
- Years offered: Year 7–Year 12
- Age range: 11–18
- Enrolment: Approximately 2200
- Language: English, Chinese, Japanese, French
- Hours in school day: 7.5
- Campus: Cherrybrook Campus
- Campus size: ~40520m²
- Student Representation: CTHS Student Representative Council
- Colours: Black, grey, white and red
- Athletics: Yes
- Sports: Yes
- Team name: CTHS Knockout Team
- Key products: CTHS Student Uniform, CTHS Exclusive Wears
- Tuition: Non-Compulsory
- Affiliation: A Bendingo Bank School
- Alumni: CTHS Alumini
- Website: https://cths.schools.nsw.gov.au
- Last updated: 4 November 2026

Cherrybrook Technology High School is a purpose-built government technology high school located in Cherrybrook, a suburb in Sydney, Australia. The school was built in the late 1980s to support the rapid growth of the north-west sector in Sydney. With the school's completion and opening in 1992 the sheer size and capabilities of the school have grown beyond expectations. In 2002, a new two storey building with administration facilities on the ground floor and 12 classrooms on the top level was opened, bringing the permanent housing of the school up to 1250 students. 2009 saw the student population rise to over 2,000 for the first time.

== History and development ==
=== School development ===
The school's development and planning began in the late 1980s. The Department of Education and Community at the time had decided to build the school on a block of land adjacent to John Purchase Public School; the land was previously occupied with orchards containing remnants of old growth forest. At the time the government was creating a chain of technology schools throughout NSW. The school was initiated into this chain after talks between the Minister of Education at the time, Terry Metherell, and the then CEO of IBM, Brian Finn.

The school hired its first principal and deputies in 1990 with Lyn Wendtman as Principal and Peter Gillam and Dave Wilson as Deputy Principals. These three key figures took their duties up in February 1991 and were responsible for complex negotiations between businesses, public works, designers and builders. They also developed a local P&C, school council, school organisation, staffing and enrolment models and draft policies.

The first students accepted into Cherrybrook Technology High School were accommodated and taught at Pennant Hills High School in 1991. They relocated to their new school in 1992. In 2008, Cherrybrook Technology High School achieved an enrolment of 1993 students, making it the largest public comprehensive secondary school in NSW and one of the largest schools in Australia.

Staff in 1992 was gained from both transfers and selections based on merit. Additional staff in the following years were all appointed by merit, with several highly talented young teachers proving themselves to the parents and students of the schooling community. Cherrybrook Technology High School was officially opened on 15 May 1992 by the Hon Nick Greiner (who was the Premier of New South Wales at the time).

== Student Representative Council ==
Cherrybrook Technology High School has an active Student Representative Council (SRC) which is responsible for co-ordinating events which benefit the student body and the school as a whole. The events put on by the SRC are used largely to raise funds for charities within Australia and abroad. Events in the past have included 'Wacky Hair Day', 'Superheroes and Villains Day', 'Valentine's Day' and 'Super Mega Happy Week'. The SRC aims to hold events which are not only enjoyable for students - but also encourage school spirit. In 2008 the SRC also attempted to break the world record for the most people simultaneously dancing "Heads, Shoulders, Knees and Toes" with approximately 700 participants. The student executive responsible for the organisation of the event were interviewed two days after this event on the popular breakfast program Sunrise.

== Senior executive staff ==
When the school opened in 1992 Lyn Wendtman was Principal, while Dave Wilson and Peter Gillam were appointed as her deputy principals. In 2016 the senior executive team comprises Gary Johnson, Brett Clements, Jenny Bevan and Matt Townsend. The following table shows when each started and finished at the school. Following this year it is expected that a new system will be implemented, where students will be permitted to vote for any teachers in the school to become the new senior executive team.

Years	Principal	Deputy Principals
1991–2002	Lyn Wendtman	Dave Wilson, Peter Gillam
2003	Gary Johnson	Mark Watson, Jeff Bruce, Dave Wilson
2004–2008	Gary Johnson	Mark Watson, Jeff Bruce, Richard Di Marzo
2008–2009	Gary Johnson	Mark Watson, Richard Di Marzo, Jenny Weal
2010–2011	Gary Johnson	Richard Di Marzo, Jenny Weal, Russell Summerhayes
2012–2014	Gary Johnson	Jenny Weal, Russell Summerhayes, Jenny Bevan
2014	Gary Johnson	Jenny Weal, Jenny Bevan, Matt Townsend
2015–2017	Gary Johnson	Brett Clements, Jenny Bevan, Matt Townsend
2018–2023	Gary Johnson	Matt Townsend, Brett Clements, Alison Gatt
2024–Mid 2025	Matt Townsend	Brett Clements, Alison Gatt, Matt Fisher
2025–present	Matt Townsend	Brett Clements, Alison Gatt, Matt Fisher, Rebecca Donoghue

== Notable alumni ==
- Michael Guy Chislett, lead guitarist, backup vocalist and pianist of The Academy Is...
- Kenny Sabir, musician and label founder of Elefant Traks
- Jai Courtney, actor
- Jenny Blundell, Australian Olympic athlete specialising in middle-distance running
- Lisa Sthalekar, former captain of Australia women's national cricket team
- Ryan Siew, lead guitarist of Polaris
- Georgia Winkcup, Australian Olympic athlete

== Notable staff ==
- Eddie Woo, Maths teacher
