= This Is Not Art =

Australian art and media festival

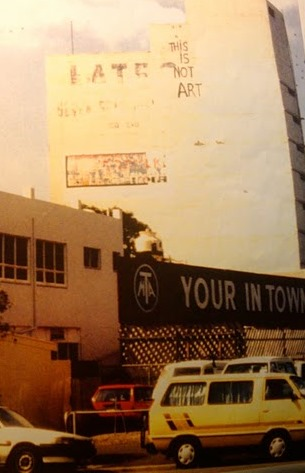
The graffiti that inspired the name of the TiNA festivals

This Is Not Art (TiNA) is a national festival of new media and arts organised in Newcastle, New South Wales, Australia each year over the October long weekend since 1998. TiNA is dedicated to the work and ideas of artistic communities not generally included in other major Australian arts festivals or institutions. The program includes the festivals Electrofringe, the National Young Writers' Festival, Critical Animals, and Crack Theatre Festival.

== Naming ==
The name This Is Not Art was adopted in 2000 to reflect the very different but interconnected events of the festival. It takes its name from a piece of graffiti on what was Newcastle's tallest building, Latec House (now completely refurbished and converted to apartments), which had been derelict for several years. The name also refers to the content of the event, which is outside the ambit of traditional Australian arts festivals.

== History ==
This Is Not Art evolved from the National Young Writers Festival and National Student Media Conference which were established in Newcastle in September 1998. In 1999, The National Young Writers Festival combined with the Electrofringe Festival (which had previously been an independently organised part of the now defunct Newcastle Fringe Festival) and moved to the October long weekend. In 2000, the addition of Sound Summit (then known as the National Independent Electronic Labels Conference) and several other smaller events necessitated the invention of an umbrella term to cover all of the disparate events. In 2002 Vital Focus Productions (now Minski Media) made a 25-minute open source documentary about TiNA called Dancing to Architecture - a motion picture about TiNA. For the first 3 years, This Is Not Art was directed by Marcus Westbury who had previously been the founding director of The National Young Writers' Festival.

== Structure ==
Each year TiNA is produced by Octapod in partnership with arts collectives and organisations from across Australia. In 2015 TiNA will once again present programs from Crack Theatre Festival, National Young Writers’ Festival and Critical Animals.

== Notable guests ==
Over its lifespan a wide variety of guests have appeared at This Is Not Art including:

Kevin Blechdom, Sage Francis, Cold Cut, The Light Surgeons, Caribou, Concord Dawn, Mad Professor, Anticon, Fat Cat Records, Paul Reed Smith, Little Nobody, b(if)tek, The Herd, Hrvatski, Thomas Frank, John Safran, Stephen Mayne, Margo Kingston, Nasenbluten, Marieke Hardy, DJ Scotch Egg, Leaf Cutter John, Tim Hecker and many more.

== See also ==
- List of festivals
- List of Australian music festivals
