= Summerland (album) =

Studio album by the Herd
- Released: 24 May 2008
- Recorded: Elefant Mansion
- Genre: Australian hip-hop
- Length: 59:33
- Label: Elefant Traks
- Producers: The Herd, Ozi Batla, Sulo, Traksewt, Unkle Ho

The Herd chronology
The Sun Never Sets (2005)	Summerland (2008)	Future Shade (2011)

Singles from Summerland
- 1. "The King is Dead" Released: 12 April 2008; 2. "2020" Released: 11 October 2008

Summerland is the fourth studio album by Australian hip-hop band the Herd and was released on 24 May 2008. The Herd announced its new album in March 2008, in early May of that year the first single from the album, "The King is Dead", received radio airplay, it makes reference to Australia's change in government with John Howard being replaced after 11 years as prime minister by Kevin Rudd.

The album debuted at #7 on the ARIA Album charts and reached #2 on the Top 40 Urban Album charts. At the ARIA Music Awards of 2008, it was also nominated for Best Urban Release.

At the AIR Awards of 2008, the album won Best Independent Urban/Hip Hop Album.

The Mike Daly directed film clip for the second single from the album, "2020", was nominated and won the Best Music Video at the J Awards of 2008.

== Track listing ==
1. "2020" - 3:47
2. "Freedom Samba" - 4:27
3. "The King is Dead" - 4:11
4. "Time to Face the Truth" - 4:37
5. "Kids Learn Quick" - 4:13
6. "A Few Things" - 4:13
7. "Pearl" - 4:25
8. "My Home" - 4:15
9. "Zug Zug" - 4:20
10. "Emergency" - 4:21
11. "Toorali" - 3:25
12. "Black & Blue" - 4:20
13. "When You Escape (Music v. Fashion)" - 4:36
14. "The Next Movement" - 4:40

== Charts ==
Chart (2008)	Peak position
Australian ARIA Albums Chart	7
