= The Herd (Australian band) =

Australian hip hop group

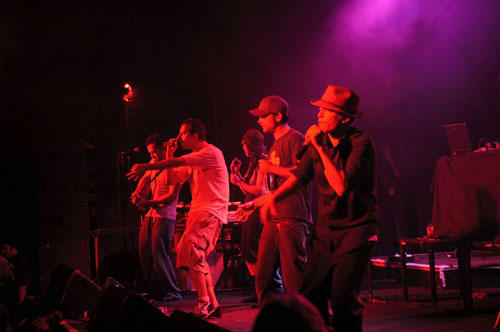
- The Herd performing live on stage at the Metro Theatre in October 2005

Background information
- Origin: Sydney, New South Wales, Australia
- Genre: Australian hip hop
- Years active: 2001–2013, 2024–present (Reunions: 2018, 2019)
- Label: Elefant Traks
- Members: Traksewt (Kenny Sabir); Rok Poshtya (Dale Harrison); Ozi Batla (Shannon Kennedy); Urthboy (Tim Levinson); Unkle Ho (Kaho Cheung); Toe-Fu (Byron Williams); Sulo (Richard Tamplenizza); Jane Tyrrell
- Past members: Bezerkatron (Simon Fellows); Alejandro (Alex Swarbrick); Flatmax (Matt Flax)
- Website: Official site

The Herd are an Australian hip hop group, formed in Sydney 2001. The group is composed of MCs Ozi Batla, Urthboy and Berzerkatron, along with producer Unkle Ho, multi-instrumentalist Traksewt, guitarists Sulo and Toe-Fu, bassist Rok Poshtya and singer Jane Tyrrell. The band's songs often feature politically oriented lyrics, with the group closely aligned with left-wing politics. The group was largely inactive from 2013 onwards, reuniting for select performances, before reuniting in earnest circa 2024.

== History ==
=== 2001–2004: The Herd & An Elefant Never Forgets ===
The Herd released their debut single "Scallops" in 2001. The song attracted radio airplay on Australian station Triple J. The song combines hip hop culture with Australian "fast food" descriptions including "Like a $3.40 bag of fresh hip hop, From your local fish n' chip shop, Ah Scallops! With dollops of flavour on top, When we do what we do we give heads the bops"

The band's second album, An Elefant Never Forgets was released in 2003. The first single "Burn Down the Parliament", was released the same week as the Canberra bushfires of 2003, despite the unfortunate coincidence, the song's lyrical content was completely unrelated to the natural disaster. The second single "77%", became a prominent song featuring the line: "77% of Aussies are racist"—the lyric is a reference to 2001 Australian survey results regarding the response of the Australian Federal Government, led by then-prime minister John Howard, to the Tampa affair. "77%" was voted into position 46 of the Triple J Hottest 100 of 2003 and the album remained in the Australian alternative charts for over 80 weeks.

In a 2004 interview with Dr Tony Mitchell from the University of Technology Sydney (UTS), Ozi Batla explained:

I think the big challenge for Australian hip-hop is for it to expand on those 3000 people who will always buy the CD. The question people have to ask themselves is, who are the other 35000 odd people who bought the Hilltop Hoods album? It's such a small insular and at times disturbingly ignorant little slice of Australia that I think we'd just be banging our heads against the wall trying to get through to those 15-year-old kids. Yeah, I don't know. There's always that responsibility of just trying to keep it true, even though we don't focus on that as much as a lot of acts do, I think it's always in the back of everyone's mind – probably whatever art form it is – that if they really love the art form that they're attempting or drawing influences from then, you know, everyone is always really quite sensitive about other people's perceptions in that culture or community. I think that's the only responsibility, and obviously not to sell out is the other one. But that is pretty unlikely. And I'd say to hopefully bring more people in and that'll change the culture of it, or it'll make that more ignorant style of the culture a bit more isolated. I don't know, to tell you the truth, sometimes I don't feel like we're part of the community that's there at all. And neither are a lot of the artists we know, and even the artists that are respected in that community just throw their hands up and go 'Look, I stopped trying to deal on that level with those fans a long time'".

=== 2005–2007: The Sun Never Sets ===
The Herd released their third album The Sun Never Sets in 2005, featuring the single "We Can't Hear You". Their subjects ranged from their well-known anti-war stance and anti-corporatism to more personal topics like divorce and the slow death of the Australian outback/country.

In October 2005, The Herd featured live on Triple J's 'Like a Version' (acoustic covers) segment. They performed their own version of the famous Australian 1983 song "I Was Only Nineteen (A Walk in the Light Green)" by Redgum. The song was so well received by fans that it received regular Triple J airplay and was voted #18 in the 2005 Triple J Hottest 100 countdown. They have since recorded a studio version which was included on the 2006 re-release of The Sun Never Sets, and they have also created a video clip for the song. The Herd performed at The Big Day Out 2007. Simon Fellows (Bezerkatron) left the group in late 2006.

In February 2008 the group performed a song about recycled water on the ABC's Sleek Geeks programme.

=== 2008–2010: Summerland ===
In May 2008, The Herd released its fourth studio album, Summerland. The first single from the album, "The King Is Dead", was written in celebration of Australia's change in government, with John Howard being replaced after 11 years as prime minister by Kevin Rudd.

The album debuted at number 7 on the ARIA Albums Chart, and is the first album by The Herd to feature singer Jane Tyrell as full-time member of the group. Previously, Tyrell had provided vocals for a few songs on The Herd's previous album, The Sun Never Sets.

=== 2011–present: Future Shade, hiatus and reunions ===
In celebration of 10 years since the group debuted, the band performed its first live shows in two years in April 2011. The Herd released "The Sum of it All", the first single from the band's fifth album, Future Shade, on 21 March 2011, The album was released in August 2011. The Better Live EP, a follow-up to Future Shade, was released the following year in March 2012.

The Herd performed at WOMADelaide, held at Botanic Park in Adelaide, Australia, in March 2013 and at the tenth anniversary of the Australian hip hop festival Come Together in June 2013. Following their performance at the 15th anniversary shows for Elefant Traks, the group entered a period of inactivity. Tyrrell pursued a solo career, releasing the album Echoes in the Aviary in 2014, while Levinson resumed touring and recording as Urthboy – often performing with Tyrrell.

In the late 2010s, The Herd reunited for a show at Sydney's Enmore Theatre with Yothu Yindi and Baker Boy, as well as a performance at Queenscliff Music Festival. They also returned to Like a Version for a third time, covering Wafia's "Bodies", and performed at Elefant Traks' 20th anniversary shows. In 2019, the group performed at the Woodford Folk Festival.

In June 2024, after nearly 12 years of inactivity as a recording act, The Herd released the single "Soul of My Soul", a protest song against the Israel-Palestine war which features vocal contributions from Palestinian artists Sereen, Mo and Big Rigs. All proceeds from the song went towards Olive Kids, an Australian foundation dedicated to funding support for Palestinian youth. In November 2025, the group announced their first headlining tour in nearly 15 years for February 2026, to celebrate the 20th anniversary of The Sun Never Sets. The band will perform at the Riverboats Music Festival in February 2027.

== Activism ==
In September 2009, The Herd was involved in a controversy regarding the act's inclusion in the line-up for Coal to Coast, a regional youth festival held in Mackay, Queensland, with the local coal industry acting as the event's primary funding source. Concerned fans brought the issue of the Herd's involvement in the festival to the group's attention and the story received national coverage in the mainstream media and debate occurred on Hack, a popular program on national radio station Triple J. As a response, Urthboy released a statement of apology and declared the urgency of global warming; he explained that the group's booking agent, in addition to the Mackay Regional Council, failed to inform the band of the complete nature of the festival. The band proceeded to donate profits from the performance to Greenpeace, as part of the apology.

Twenty-nine hours before the band was due to perform, The Herd pulled out of the festival entirely, as the band members had discovered information—in multiple sources—that the festival was conceived of by Andrew Garratt, the Community Relations Officer at the Dalrymple Bay Coal Terminal. Ozi Batla appeared on 'Hack' to discuss the band's decision to withdraw from the festival, alongside the Queensland Young Liberals leader, who disagreed with the group's decision, and the organiser of the festival.

In response to the proposed dumping of around 3 million cubic metres of dredged seabed onto the Great Barrier Reef, a legal team was formed by World Wide Fund for Nature (WWF)-Australia and the Australian Marine Conservation Society (AMCS) in late 2013/early 2014. The legal team received further support in April 2014, following the release of the "Sounds for the Reef" musical fundraising project. Produced by Straightup, the digital album features The Herd, in addition to artists such as John Butler, Sietta, Missy Higgins, The Cat Empire, Fat Freddys Drop, The Bamboos (featuring Kylie Auldist) and Resin Dogs. Released on 7 April, the album's 21 songs were sold on the Bandcamp website.

== Side projects ==
In April 2005, Unkle Ho released his debut solo album Roads to Roma. The album samples music from a wide variety of international musical genres, such as tango, mariachi, dixieland and blues rock. According to the Elefant Traks website, "[Unkle Ho's] strategy for world peace is to write a song that has every culture in the world represented, so people will drop their guns and dance 'till they can't dance no more." Roads to Roma was acclaimed as "bewitchingly beautiful" by Rolling Stone magazine. Unkle Ho's second album Circus Maximus was released in May 2007.

In 2004, Urthboy released his first solo album, Distant Sense of Random Menace, followed by The Signal (2007), Spitshine (2009), Smokey's Haunt (2012), Smokey's Homies Remix EP (2013) Live at the City Recital Hall Angel Place (2013), The Past Beats Inside Me Like a Second Heartbeat (2016) and Savour (2023).

In 2010, Ozi Batla released his debut album Wild Colonial, while Tyrrell released her debut album Echoes in the Aviary in the second half of 2014.

== Discography ==
=== Studio albums ===
List of studio albums, with selected chart positions
Title	Album details	Peak chart positions
Title	Album details	AUS
The Herd	Released: September 2001; Label: Elefant Traks (ACE007)	-
An Elefant Never Forgets	Released: February 2003; Label: Elefant Traks (ACE009)	-
The Sun Never Sets	Released: 3 October 2005; Label: Elefant Traks (ACE021)	69
Summerland	Released: May 2008; Label: Elefant Traks (ACE039)	7
Future Shade	Released: 26 August 2011; Label: Elefant Traks (ACE062)	22

=== Live albums ===
Title	Details
Better Alive	Released: May 2012; Label: Elefant Traks (ACE075)

=== Remix albums ===
Title	Details
Trampled – The Elefant Traks Remix Album	Released: 1 August 2006; Label: Elefant Traks (ACE023)

=== Single ===
Title	Year	Peak chart positions	Certifications	Album
Title	Year	AUS	Certifications	Album
"Scallops"	2001	—		The Herd
"Burn Down the Parliament"	2003	-		An Elephant Never Forgets
"77%"	2003	—		An Elephant Never Forgets
"We Can't Hear You"	2005	—		The Sun Never Sets
"I Was Only Nineteen (A Walk in the Light Green)" (featuring John Schumann)	2005	—	ARIA: Gold	The Sun Never Sets
"Unpredictable"	2006	—		The Sun Never Sets
"The King is Dead"	2008	58	ARIA: Gold	Summerland
"2020"	2008	—		Summerland
"Signs of Life"	2011	—		Future Shade
"Better Alive"	2012	—		Future Shade
"Soul of my Soul" (featuring Sereen, Mo and Big Rigs)	2024	—		TBA

== Awards and nominations ==
The song "A Thousand Lives" from "Future Shade" was a finalist in the International Songwriting Competition, where it received an honourable mention.

=== AIR Awards ===
The Australian Independent Record Awards (commonly known informally as AIR Awards) is an annual awards night to recognise, promote and celebrate the success of Australia's Independent Music sector.

Year	Nominee / work	Award	Result
2006	The Sun Never Sets	Best Performing Independent Album	Nominated
2006	themselves	Independent Artist of the Year	Nominated
2008	Summerland	Best Independent Urban/Hip Hop Album	Won
2008	themselves	Best Independent Artist	Won
2012	Future Shade	Best Independent Urban/Hip Hop Album	Nominated

=== ARIA Music Awards ===
The ARIA Music Awards is an annual awards ceremony that recognises excellence, innovation, and achievement across all genres of Australian music.

Year	Nominee / work	Award	Result
2008	Summerland	Best Urban Album	Nominated
2012	Future Shade	Best Urban Album	Nominated

=== J Award ===
The J Awards are an annual series of Australian music awards that were established by the Australian Broadcasting Corporation's youth-focused radio station Triple J. They commenced in 2005.

Year	Nominee / work	Award	Result
2005	The Sun Never Sets	Australian Album of the Year	Nominated
2008	"2020"	Australian Video of the Year	Won
