= Marcus Westbury =

- Born: 1974 (age 51–52); Australia

Marcus Westbury OAM (born 1974) is an Australian urbanist, festival director, TV presenter, writer and broadcaster. He is based in Melbourne, Australia where he filmed the TV series Not Quite Art. for the Australian Broadcasting Corporation screened during October–November 2007.

Westbury founded urban renewable projects RenewNewcastle, and later Renew Australia.

== Biography ==
Westbury's mother Kaye Westbury was the Australian Democrats candidate for the Division of Newcastle in 1998 when she died on the eve of the election, forcing a postponement of the vote in the city.

=== Arts and festivals ===
Between 1998 and 2002 Westbury was the founder and manager of the This Is Not Art festival in Newcastle, New South Wales.

Westbury was the Director of the 2004 and 2006 Next Wave Festivals under the themes of Unpopular Culture (2004) and Empire Games (2006). In 2006, Westbury was also a Director of Festival Melbourne 2006, the cultural program of the Melbourne 2006 Commonwealth Games.

Marcus Westbury also co-founded and was one of the directors of the Freeplay Independent Games Festival, Australia's largest independent computer games developers' conference.

In December 2015, Westbury was appointed inaugural chief executive of the Collingwood Arts Precinct.

Urban Renewal projects

In 2008, Westbury founded and was creative director for RenewNewcastle, a project which transformed empty main street shopfronts in the city of Newcastle, NSW into creative spaces for local artists and artisans, "giving a significant economic and social value back to the community".

After the project's success, Westbury worked as a consultant for similar projects in other areas. In 2014, Westbury published a book on urban renewal titled Creating Cities. In 2015, he founded non-profit Renew Australia, "a national social enterprise designed to catalyse community renewal, economic development, the arts and creative industries across Australia."

=== Media projects ===
Westbury has worked across a range of media including as a commentator and producer for ABC Local Radio in Newcastle, Sydney and Melbourne and ABC Radio National and has featured on a range of ABC TV series including Recovery, Critical Mass and Vulture. As an occasionally published writer, Westbury is also a coauthor of the h2w2 guidebook (published by the Australia Council) and a tongue in cheek tourism guide to Newcastle called Newcastle Navigator.

== Media coverage ==
- Oliver, Robin (15 October 2007). "Not Quite Art". The Age.
- Hill, Jason (2 October 2007). "Screen Play: Not Quite Art". The Age. Archived from the original on 15 October 2007.
- Cooke, Dewi., The Sydney Morning Herald Newspaper, 22 December 2015.
