= Hilltop Hoods discography =

- Studio albums: 9
- EPs: 3
- Compilation albums: 1
- Remix albums: 2
- Singles: 33
- Video albums: 3
- Instrumental albums: 4

The discography of Australian hip hop group Hilltop Hoods consists of eight studio albums, one compilation albums, three extended plays (EPs), thirty-three singles and three DVDs. Their debut studio album A Matter of Time was released independently in 1999.

Their second studio album Left Foot, Right Foot was also released independently two years later in 2001, while their first label record, their third studio album The Calling, was released via Obese Records on 22 September 2003. It became Hilltop Hoods' first charted album as it peaked at 50th on the Australian national chart. It was also certified platinum in Australia by the Australian Recording Industry Association (ARIA).

Their fourth studio album became their first number one album in Australia, titled The Hard Road. Released on 6 April 2006 via Obese Records, it was certified platinum by ARIA. The record also received a remixed version the following year, titled The Hard Road: Restrung, it placed at 8th on the Australian chart and was certified gold in the country. State of the Art, their fifth studio album, became their second number one album in the country and their first double platinum record. It was released on 12 June 2009 via Golden Era Records.

Their subsequent two albums, Drinking from the Sun (2012) and Walking Under Stars (2014), were also certified double-platinum and charted at number one in Australia. Drinking from the Sun, which is Hilltop Hood's sixth studio album, peaked in New Zealand at 37th while their seventh studio album Walking Under Stars debuted at 23rd in the country and also at 19th in Switzerland. Their sixth and seventh studio albums were modified and re-released in 2016 as Drinking from the Sun, Walking Under Stars Restrung, a remix album. It was certified platinum and charted in Australia and Switzerland at number one and fifty respectively.

== Albums ==
=== Studio albums ===
List of studio albums, with selected details, peak chart positions and certifications
Title	Album details	Peak chart positions			Certifications
Title	Album details	AUS	NZ	SWI	Certifications
A Matter of Time	Released: 1999; Label: Independent; Formats: CD, digital download	—	—	—	
Left Foot, Right Foot	Released: 2001; Label: Independent; Formats: CD, 2LP	—	—	—	
The Calling	Released: 22 September 2003; Label: Obese; Formats: 2LP, CD, digital download, streaming	50	—	—	ARIA: Platinum
The Hard Road	Released: 1 April 2006; Label: Obese; Formats: CD, digital download, streaming	1	—	—	ARIA: Platinum
State of the Art	Released: 12 June 2009; Label: Golden Era; Formats: CD, digital download, streaming	1	—	—	ARIA: 3× Platinum
Drinking from the Sun	Released: 9 March 2012; Label: Golden Era; Formats: CD, digital download, streaming	1	37	—	ARIA: 2× Platinum; RMNZ: Gold
Walking Under Stars	Released: 8 August 2014; Label: Golden Era; Formats: CD, digital download, streaming	1	23	19	ARIA: 3× Platinum; RMNZ: Gold
The Great Expanse	Released: 22 February 2019; Label: Golden Era, Universal; Formats: CD, vinyl, digital download, streaming	1	—	18	ARIA: Platinum
Fall from the Light	Released: 1 August 2025; Label: Island Australia, Universal; Formats: CD, vinyl, digital download, streaming	1	—	—	
"—" denotes a recording that did not chart or was not released in that territory.

=== Compilation albums ===
List of compilation albums, with selected details and peak chart positions
Title	Album details	Peak chart positions
Title	Album details	AUS
The Highlights	Released: 15 November 2023; Label: Universal; Formats: digital download, streaming	37

=== Remix albums ===
List of remix albums, with selected details, peak chart positions and certifications
Title	Album details	Peak chart positions		Certifications
Title	Album details	AUS	SWI	Certifications
The Hard Road: Restrung	Released: 23 May 2007; Label: Obese Records; Formats: CD, digital download	8	—	ARIA: Gold
Drinking from the Sun, Walking Under Stars Restrung	Released: 19 February 2016; Label: Golden Era Records; Formats: CD, digital download	1	50	ARIA: Platinum; RMNZ: Gold

=== Instrumental albums ===
List of instrumental albums, with selected details and peak chart positions
Title	Album details	Peak chart positions
Title	Album details	AUS
State of the Art (Instrumental Edition)	Released: 2 October 2020; Label: Independent; Format: LP	31
Drinking from the Sun (Instrumental Edition)	Released: 23 October 2020; Label: Independent; Format: LP	21
Walking Under Stars (Instrumental Edition)	Released: 20 November 2020; Label: Independent; Format: LP	37
The Great Expanse (Instrumental Edition)	Released: 4 December 2020; Label: Independent; Format: LP	33

== Extended plays ==
- Back Once Again – Independent (1997)
- The Good Life in the Sun – Golden Era Records (2012)
- The Cold Night Sky – Golden Era Records (2015)

== Singles ==
List of singles, with peak chart positions and certifications
Title	Year	Peak chart positions		Year-end positions	Certifications	Album
Title	Year	AUS	NZ	Triple J Hottest 100	Certifications	Album
"Testimonial Year"	2003	—	—	—		The Calling
"Dumb Enough"	2003	—	—	44	ARIA: Gold	The Calling
"The Nosebleed Section"	2003	31	—	9	ARIA: 10× Platinum; RMNZ: Platinum	The Calling
"Clown Prince"	2006	30	—	23	ARIA: Gold	The Hard Road
"The Hard Road"	2006	—	—	3	ARIA: 2× Platinum	The Hard Road
"What a Great Night"	2006	—	—	41		The Hard Road
"Recapturing the Vibe Restrung"	2007	—	—	26		The Hard Road: Restrung
"Chase That Feeling"	2009	8	—	3	ARIA: 6× Platinum	State of the Art
"Still Standing"	2009	34	—	37	ARIA: 2× Platinum	State of the Art
"The Light You Burned" (featuring Trials)	2009	62	—	—		State of the Art
"I Love It" (featuring Sia)	2011	6	13	10	ARIA: 8× Platinum; RMNZ: Platinum	Drinking from the Sun
"Speaking in Tongues" (featuring Chali 2na)	2012	88	—	—	ARIA: Platinum	Drinking from the Sun
"Shredding the Balloon"	2012	—	—	—	ARIA: Platinum	Drinking from the Sun
"Rattling the Keys to the Kingdom"	2012	64	—	84	ARIA: Platinum	Drinking from the Sun
"Won't Let You Down" (featuring Maverick Sabre)	2014	17	—	36	ARIA: 2× Platinum	Walking Under Stars
"Pyramid Building"	2014	42	—	—		Walking Under Stars
"Walking Under Stars"	2014	—	—	58	ARIA: Gold	Walking Under Stars
"Cosby Sweater"	2014	4	—	3	ARIA: 12× Platinum; RMNZ: Platinum	Walking Under Stars
"Live and Let Go" (featuring Maverick Sabre and Brother Ali)	2015	42	—	—	ARIA: Gold	Walking Under Stars
"The Art of the Handshake"	2015	—	—	—	ARIA: Gold	Walking Under Stars
"Higher" (featuring James Chatburn)	2015	9	—	49	ARIA: 3× Platinum	Drinking from the Sun, Walking Under Stars Restrung
"1955" (featuring Montaigne and Tom Thum)	2016	2	— (Note: "1955" did not enter the NZ Top 40 Singles Chart, but peaked at number 8 on the NZ Heatseeker Singles chart.)	4	ARIA: 12× Platinum; RMNZ: 2× Platinum	Drinking from the Sun, Walking Under Stars Restrung
"I'm a Ghost (Restrung)"	2016	—	—	—	ARIA: Gold	Drinking from the Sun, Walking Under Stars Restrung
"2016 Golden Era Cypher" (with Funkoars, A.B. Original, Briggs, Vents, K21 & Purpose)	2016	—	—	—		Non-album single
"Clark Griswold" (featuring Adrian Eagle)	2018	48	—	44	ARIA: 2× Platinum	The Great Expanse
"Leave Me Lonely"	2018	11	— (Note: "Leave Me Lonely" did not enter the NZ Top 40 Singles Chart, but peaked at number 15 on the NZ Hot Singles Chart.)	24	ARIA: 6× Platinum; RMNZ: Platinum	The Great Expanse
"Exit Sign" (featuring Illy and Ecca Vandal)	2019	16	—	10	ARIA: 6× Platinum; RMNZ: Platinum	The Great Expanse
"Can't Stop" (Triple J Like a Version)	2019	—	—	—		Non-album singles
"I'm Good?"	2020	41	—	9	ARIA: 3× Platinum	Non-album singles
"Show Business" (featuring Eamon)	2022	—	—	71	ARIA: Gold	Non-album singles
"A Whole Day's Night" (featuring Montaigne and Tom Thum)	2022	—	—	54		Non-album singles
"Laced Up"	2023	—	— (Note: "Laced Up" did not enter the NZ Top 40 Singles Chart, but peaked at number 38 on the NZ Hot Singles Chart.)	37	ARIA: Gold	The Highlights and Fall from the Light
"The Gift" (featuring Marlon Motlop)	2025	—	—	—		Fall from the Light
"Don't Happy, Be Worry"	2025	—	—	—		Fall from the Light
"Never Coming Home" (with Six60)	2025	—	— (Note: "Never Coming Home" did not enter the NZ Top 40 Singles Chart, but peaked at number 19 on the NZ Hot Singles Chart.)	—		Fall from the Light
"—" denotes a recording that did not chart or was not released in that territory.

== Other charted and certified songs ==
List of other certified songs, with selected peak chart positions and certifications
Title	Year	Peak chart positions	Certifications	Album
Title	Year	NZ Hot	Certifications	Album
"Fifty in Five"	2009	—	ARIA: Gold	State of the Art
"Through the Dark"	2014	—	ARIA: Gold	Walking Under Stars
"Sell It All, Run Away" (featuring Timberwolf)	2019	—	ARIA: Gold	The Great Expanse
"Get Well Soon" (featuring Six60)	2025	34		Fall from the Light
"Rage Against the Fatigue"	2025	29		Fall from the Light

== Video albums ==
List of video albums, with selected details and certifications
Title	Details	Certification
The Calling Live	Released: 2005; Label: Obese Records	ARIA: Gold
The City of Light	Released: 2007; Label: Obese Records	ARIA: Gold
Parade of the Dead	Released: 2010; Label: Golden Era	ARIA: Platinum

== Production credits ==
- Everyone We Know – Thundamentals (song: "21 Grams") (2017)
- Seven Mirrors – Drapht (song: "Don Quixote") (2016)
- Nobody's Business – Maundz (song: "Mad Nice") (2015)
- Golden Era Records Mixtape 2014 – Various (song: "Posse Cut (Cypher)") (2014)
- Golden Era Records Mixtape 2013 – Various (songs: "Rattling The Keys To The Kingdom (K21 Remix)", "Posse Cut") (2013)
- Cinematic – Illy (song: "Coming Down") (2013)
- Golden Era Mixtape 2012 – Various (songs: "I Love It (Trials Remix)", "Rattling The Keys To The Kingdom") (2012)
- The Quickening – The Funkoars (song: "Bodycount") (2011)
- Marked For Death – Vents (song: "Chaos") (2011)
- Fear and Loathing – Hunter & Mortar (song: "Bat Country" w/ Layla and Graphic) (2011)
- Golden Era Mixtape 2011 – Various (songs: "Debris Told Me", "Chase That Feeling") (2011)
- Window of Time – Reason (songs: "Kosher", "Action", "Youth", "Window of Time", "I Want...", "We Come From An Era", "Dedicate", "Don't Believe") (2011)
- The Blacklist – Briggs (song: "Since Forever (The Storytellers)") (2010)
- Strange Journey Volume One – CunninLynguists (song: "Nothing But Strangeness") (2009)
- The Hangover – The Funkoars (song: "Double Dutch") (2008)
- The Tides are Turning – Reason (songs: "Cloud Surfing", "Grounded") (2008)
- Batterie – Omni (song: "We Are All We Have") (2007)
- Burn City – Pegz (songs: "No Attachments", "The Fight") (2007)
- Hard to Kill – Vents (songs: "In the Shadows", "In the Shadows (Trials Remix)") (2007)
- Day of the Dog – Bliss n Eso (song: "Watch Your Mouth") (2006)
- Diggi Down Under – Mystro (songs: "Trade Secrets", "Public Herbalist Announcement", "Wizard Of Oz") (2006)
- The Greatest Hits – The Funkoars (songs: "What I Want", "Meet the Family") (2006)
- Axis – Pegz (song: "This Is For Life") (2005)
- Who Am I – Drapht (song: "Verbally Flawless") (2005)
- 15.Oz Vinyl 15 Years Of Australian Hip-Hop On Vinyl – Various (song: "Back Once Again") (2004)
- Flowers in the Pavement – Bliss n Eso (song: "Hip Hop Blues") (2004)
- Drastik Measures – Hyjak N Torcha (song: "Heard Of Us") (2004)
- Moving Heads – Train Of Thought (song: "Head For The Hills") (2004)
- Who's Your Step Daddy? – The Funkoars (song: "Bad Habits") (2003)
- More Than Music – Muphin (song: "Time For") (2003)
- Waking the Past – Terra Firma (songs: "Shadow Society (Remix)", "The Night The Heavens Cried", "Whats Your Name", "Divine Intervention", "Sumfinwongwitme", "Trying Times", "The Good Life (Remix)", "Shadow Society") (2003)
- World Domination – Cross Bred Mongrels (song: "Still Underrated") (2002)
- Obesecity – Various (song: "Riding Under One Banner") (2002)
- Culture of Kings Vol. 1 & 2 – Various (song: "Elevation (Live From The Jazz Lounge)") (2000)
