= Back Once Again =

EP by Hilltop Hoods
- Released: 1997
- Recorded: S.A.E Studios, Adelaide, South Australia
- Genre: Hip hop
- Length: 32:25
- Label: Independent
- Producer: Hilltop Hoods

Hilltop Hoods chronology
Back Once Again (1997)	A Matter of Time (1999)

Back Once Again is the six-track debut extended play by the Australian hip hop group, Hilltop Hoods. It was released as a 12" vinyl EP in 1997 and, as from September 2015, is rare. The title track contains a vocal sample from "Bring the Noise" by Public Enemy.

Hilltop Hoods formed in 1991 when Suffa (Matthew Lambert) and MC Pressure (Daniel Smith) met at Blackwood High School. DJ Next (Ben Hare) performed all of the Turntablist/DJ work for the group and regularly competed in the local DMC tournaments.

Hooded Puppets, a short-lived live instrumental group, comprising Chris Lambert (bass), Kenny Kreuper (drums) and Lee Moore (saxophone), contribute on two tracks on the EP. The Hooded Puppets performed alongside Hilltop Hoods at a number of their early performances.

The official launch concert for Back Once Again took place on Saturday, 24 May 1997, at the Lion Arts Bar in Adelaide. The event featured support acts including Sydney-based women's hip hop collective Wombmindspeak, local hip hop groups Fuglemen and Delta, as well as DJ sets by DJ Next, DJ Madcap, and DJ Dyems.

== Track listing ==
=== Side A / Southside ===
No.	Title	Writer(s)	Length
1.	"Back Once Again" (feat. Hooded Puppets)	Matthew Lambert; Daniel Smith	6:36
2.	"Shades of Grey"	Barry Francis; M. Lambert; Smith	5:21
3.	"No Redemption"	Lambert; Smith	4:57

=== Side B / Flipside ===
No.	Title	Writer(s)	Length
1.	"Mankind Must Suffer" (feat. Quiromystics)	M. Lambert, D. Smith, A. Bradley	5:24
2.	"Gemini" (feat. Hooded Puppets)	Chris Lambert; M. Lambert; Smith; Kenny Kruper; Lee Moore	5:12
3.	"Back Once Again Remix" (feat. Flak)	M. Lambert; Smith; Michael Vereguth	4:55

== Credits ==
- Engineer – Ben Hare, Daniel Smith
- Mastering – Neville Clark
- Producer – Hilltop Hoods
- Scratches – DJ Next
