= Fall from the Light =

Studio album by Hilltop Hoods
- Released: 1 August 2025
- Genre: Australian hip-hop
- Length: 42:15
- Label: Island Australia
- Producer: One Above; Sesta; Suffa

Hilltop Hoods chronology
The Great Expanse (2019)	Fall from the Light (2025)

Singles from Fall from the Light
- 1. "Laced Up" Released: 14 June 2023; 2. "The Gift" Released: 6 February 2025; 3. "Don't Happy, Be Worry" Released: 10 April 2025; 4. "Never Coming Home" Released: 11 July 2025

Fall from the Light is the ninth studio album by Australian hip-hop trio Hilltop Hoods, released on 1 August 2025, through Island Records Australia. The album is the group's first in six years, and was preceded by four singles: "Laced Up" (released in 2023), "The Gift", "Don't Happy, Be Worry" and "Never Coming Home". The album features contributions from Adelaide pop artist Nyassa, New Zealand pop band Six60, and former Australian rules footballer Marlon Motlop (as Marlon).

== Track listing ==
Fall from the Light track listing
No.	Title	Writer(s)	Length
1.	"Fall from the Light" (featuring Nyassa)	Matthew Lambert; Daniel Smith; Andrew Burford	3:13
2.	"Never Coming Home" (featuring Six60)	Lambert; Smith; Barry Francis; Burford; Marlon Gerbes; Chris Mac	4:05
3.	"The Gift" (featuring Marlon)	Lambert; Smith; Burford; Jim Ford	3:48
4.	"Get Well Soon" (featuring Six60)	Lambert; Smith; Francis; Burford; Gerbes; Mac; Matiu Walters	3:30
5.	"Naked"	Lambert; Smith; Burford; Francis Lai	3:00
6.	"Rage Against the Fatigue"	Lambert; Smith; Adam Baker; Stelvio Cipriani	3:26
7.	"The Omelette"	Lambert; Smith; Burford; Shibasaki Sosuke; Takeomi Akaboshi	3:11
8.	"Don't Happy, Be Worry"	Lambert; Smith; Burford	3:09
9.	"Something Bigger Than This"	Smith; Burford	3:53
10.	"This Year"	Lambert; Burford	3:07
11.	"Laced Up"	Lambert; Smith; Francis; Burford; Gerbes; Mac; Walters	3:22
12.	"The Moth" (featuring Nyassa)	Lambert; Smith; Burford	4:31
Total length:			42:15

== Personnel ==
Credits adapted from Tidal.

=== Hilltop Hoods ===
- Barry "DJ Debris" Francis – DJing (all tracks), engineering (tracks 1–9, 11, 12), programming (8)
- Matthew "Suffa" Lambert – vocals, engineering (all tracks); production (3, 5, 7, 8), drum programming (5)
- Daniel "Pressure" Smith – vocals

=== Additional contributors ===
- Andrew "One Above" Burford – production (all tracks), bass (1–5, 7, 8, 10, 12), organ (1–3, 5–7), piano (1, 2, 6, 7, 10, 12); drum programming, programming (1, 3, 4, 6–10, 12); horn arrangement (1, 3, 6–8), string arrangement (1, 10, 12), background vocals (1), synthesizer (2, 4, 6–10, 12), electric guitar (3–8, 10, 12); acoustic guitar, strings (3); keyboards (7), engineering (11)
- Serge Courtois – mixing
- Dave Kutch – mastering
- Nyassa – vocals (1, 12), background vocals (3)
- Ross Irwin – flugelhorn, trumpet (2, 3, 5)
- Stephen Mowat – engineering (2, 3, 5)
- Matiu Walters – vocals (2, 4)
- Danny Christie – vocal engineering (2)
- Phil Noy – baritone saxophone, tenor saxophone (3, 5, 6, 8); engineering (6)
- Kieran Conrau – bass trombone, trombone (3, 5)
- John Bartlett – keyboards (3, 7), piano (3, 8), strings (7), organ (8)
- Marlon – vocals (3)
- Oli Allan – engineering (4)
- Emalia Burford – vocals (5)
- Sesta – production, drum programming (6)
- Danielle Baynes – vocals (7)
- Phil Threlfall – engineering (8, 9), string engineering (12)
- Chorus Collective – choir vocals (8)
- Josef Hanna – viola, violin (10, 12)
- Matthew Hoy – cello (10, 12)

== Charts ==
=== Weekly charts ===
Chart performance for Fall from the Light
Chart (2025)	Peak position
Australian Albums (ARIA)	1
Australian Hip Hop/R&B Albums (ARIA)	1

=== Year-end charts ===
Year-end chart performance for Fall from the Light
Chart (2025)	Position
Australian Albums (ARIA)	77
