= Through the Dark (2016 film) =

- Promotional poster
- Directed by: Mike Daly
- Written by: Mike Daly; Michael Armstrong
- Produced by: Kim Wildenburg; Garett Mayow
- Music by: Hilltop Hoods
- Production companies: R/GA; XYZ Studios; Exit
- Release date: 11 November 2016
- Running time: 4 1/2 minutes
- Country: Australia

Through the Dark is a 4 1/2 minute 3D-animated interactive film, which is viewed in a web browser and rendered in real-time. The film is a collaboration between Google Play Music and Australian hip hop group Hilltop Hoods, featuring the band's song of the same title ("Through the Dark"). The song was written by band member MC Pressure (Daniel Smith) after his son was diagnosed with leukemia at eight-years-old. Based on this experience, which is told through the song's lyrics, the film tells an emotional story of a boy and his father. Through the Dark has been awarded over 50 accolades at international award shows.

== Technical aspects ==
A demonstration of how the accelerometer in a mobile phone changes the camera angle by rotating the device when viewing the film.

Through the Dark is experienced within a web browser and uses standard web technologies such as WebGL and Web Audio API. When viewed on a mobile device, the film's virtual camera is mapped to the device's accelerometer. The camera angle within the film is changed when the device is rotated or tilted, allowing the viewer to move between two worlds of light and dark. When viewed on a computer, the movement of the camera is controlled by scrolling.

== Accolades ==
Awards Show	Date	Category / Award	Result	Ref(s)
FWA Awards 2016	16 January 2017	FWA of the Year 2016	Won	
FWA Awards 2016	16 January 2017	People's Choice Award 2016	Won	
D&AD Awards 2017	27 April 2017	Crafts for Design / Animation & Illustration for Websites & Digital Design	Yellow Pencil	
D&AD Awards 2017	27 April 2017	Graphic Design / Digital & Mobile	Wood Pencil	
ADC Annual Awards 2017	8 May 2017	Interactive / Interactive Film	Gold	
ADC Annual Awards 2017	8 May 2017	Craft in Digital / Art Direction	Silver	
Creative Review 'The Annual' 2017	8 May 2017	Interactive Film & Virtual, Augmented or Mixed Reality	Won	
The One Show 2017	12 May 2017	Mobile: Craft / Visual Effects / Animation	Bronze	
The Webby Awards 2017	15 May 2017	Best Use of Animation or Motion Graphics	Won	
The Webby Awards 2017	15 May 2017	Best Use of Animation or Motion Graphics, People's Voice Award	Won	
AWARD Awards 2017	26 May 2017	Craft In Advertising / Film - Best Use and/or Arrangement of Existing Music	Gold	
AWARD Awards 2017	26 May 2017	Design / Entertainment Design	Gold	
AWARD Awards 2017	26 May 2017	Film & Video / Interactive Film, Individual. Any Length	Silver	
AWARD Awards 2017	26 May 2017	Craft In Advertising / Film - Direction	Silver	
AWARD Awards 2017	26 May 2017	Craft In Advertising / Film - Animation	Silver	
AWARD Awards 2017	26 May 2017	Craft In Advertising / Branded Entertainment and Content	Silver	
AWARD Awards 2017	26 May 2017	Branded Entertainment & Content / Mobile	Silver	
AWARD Awards 2017	26 May 2017	Branded Entertainment & Content / Experiential - Interactive	Silver	
AWARD Awards 2017	26 May 2017	Craft In Advertising / Digital - Animation	Bronze	
AWARD Awards 2017	26 May 2017	Direct Marketing / Art Direction for Direct, Individual	Bronze	
AWARD Awards 2017	26 May 2017	Digital / Mobile - Other	Bronze	
AWARD Awards 2017	26 May 2017	Digital / Online Film, Over 3 Minutes	Bronze	
AWARD Awards 2017	26 May 2017	Branded Entertainment & Content / Entertainment - Online	Bronze	
AICP Next Awards 2017	6 June 2017	Website Category	Gold	
Cannes Lions 2017	24 June 2017	Digital Craft - Overall Aesthetic Design	Gold	
Cannes Lions 2017	24 June 2017	Digital Craft - Video & Moving Image	Gold	
Cannes Lions 2017	24 June 2017	Digital Craft - Digital Illustration	Silver	
Cannes Lions 2017	24 June 2017	Film - Music Video	Silver	
Cannes Lions 2017	24 June 2017	Cyber - Interactive Video	Bronze	
Cannes Lions 2017	24 June 2017	Digital Craft - Technological Achievement	Bronze	
Cannes Lions 2017	24 June 2017	Mobile - Innovative Technology	Bronze	
AMY Awards 2017	7 July 2017	Best Content Led Marketing Campaign	Won	
MMA Awards 2017	25 September 2017	Mobile Website	Silver	
MMA Awards 2017	25 September 2017	Innovation	Silver	
MMA Awards 2017	25 September 2017	Mobile Video	Silver	
Clio Awards 2017	27 September 2017	Digital/Mobile Technique - Graphic Design	Silver	
Clio Awards 2017	27 September 2017	Digital/Mobile - Website	Bronze	
Spikes Asia 2017	29 September 2017	Digital Craft	Grand Prix	
Spikes Asia 2017	29 September 2017	Music - Excellence In Brand / Music Sponsorship or Partnership	Gold	
Spikes Asia 2017	29 September 2017	Digital Craft - Overall Aesthetic Design	Silver	
Spikes Asia 2017	29 September 2017	Music - Excellence In Music Video	Silver	
Spikes Asia 2017	29 September 2017	Digital Craft - Digital Illustration	Bronze	
Spikes Asia 2017	29 September 2017	Design - Digital & Interactive Design	Bronze	
Ciclope Festival 2017	27 October 2017	Digital Craft - Interactive Film	Gold	
London International Awards 2017	30 October 2017	Digital - Animation/Motion Graphics	Gold	
London International Awards 2017	30 October 2017	Digital - Branded Content	Silver	
London International Awards 2017	30 October 2017	Digital - Innovative Use of Digital	Bronze	
AdFest 2018	25 March 2018	Design Lotus - Motion & Digital Design	Gold	
AdFest 2018	25 March 2018	Film Lotus - Interactive Film	Silver	
AdFest 2018	25 March 2018	Interactive Lotus - Interactive VDO	Silver	
AdFest 2018	25 March 2018	Mobile Lotus - Video Viral VDO & Interactive VDO	Silver	
AdFest 2018	25 March 2018	Mobile Lotus - Use of Technology for Mobile	Silver	
