= Hilltop Hoods =

Australian hip-hop group

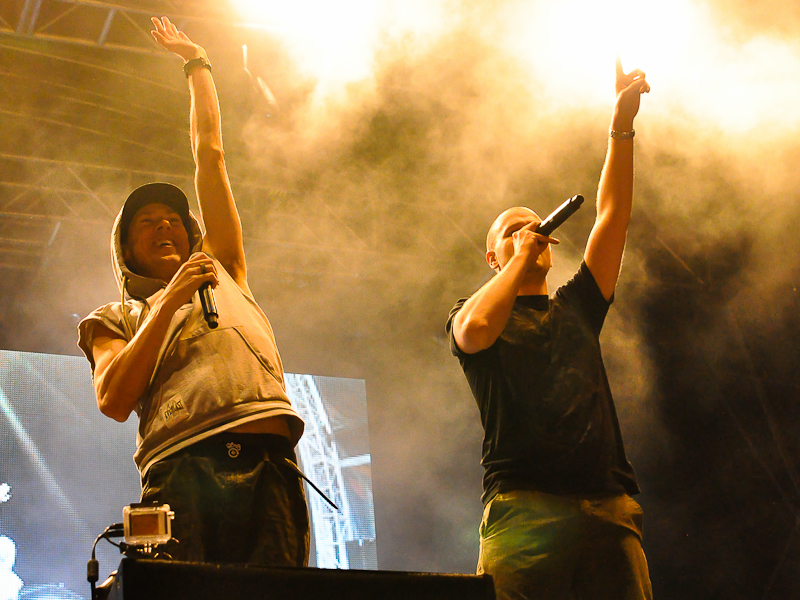
- Suffa (left) and Pressure (right) performing at Groovin' the Moo 2012

Background information
- Origin: Blackwood, South Australia, Australia
- Genre: Australian hip hop
- Works: Hilltop Hoods discography
- Years active: 1994–present
- Labels: Obese Records; Golden Era Records
- Members: Suffa; Pressure; DJ Debris
- Past members: DJ Next
- Website: hilltophoods.com

Hilltop Hoods are an Australian hip-hop group that formed in 1994 in the Adelaide suburb of Blackwood, South Australia. The group was founded by Suffa (Matthew David Lambert) and Pressure (Daniel Howe Smith), who were joined by DJ Debris (Barry John M. Francis) after fellow founder, DJ Next (Ben John Hare), left in 1999. The group released its first EP, Back Once Again, in 1997, and have subsequently released eight studio albums, two "restrung" remix albums and three EPs.

Hilltop Hoods have experienced national popularity, with six of their eight albums reaching number No. 1 on the Australian Recording Industry Association (ARIA) albums chart:The Hard Road (2006), State of the Art (2009), Drinking from the Sun (2012), Walking Under Stars (2014), Drinking from the Sun, Walking Under Stars Restrung (2016), and The Great Expanse (2019). Three tracks have reached the top 10 on the ARIA Singles Chart —"Chase That Feeling" (2009); "I Love It", featuring Sia (2011); and "Higher", featuring James Chatburn (2015). "Cosby Sweater" (2014) and "1955" (2016) reached the top 5.

Hilltop Hoods have toured both in Australia and overseas, including playing at many music festivals, including Big Day Out, Southbound, Splendour in the Grass, Groovin' The Moo, Falls Festival, and Pyramid Rock Festival.

As of January 2026 the band holds the record for the most recurrent artist in the history of the Triple J Hottest 100, with 27 songs voted into the annual countdowns since their first appearance in 2003. At the ARIA Music Awards of 2006 they won "Best Independent Release" and "Best Urban Album" for The Hard Road. In 2007, they won "Best Urban Album" for their remix album, The Hard Road: Restrung (2007). They won the same category in 2009 for State of the Art and in 2012 for Drinking from the Sun. In 2009, Debris also won "Engineer of the Year" for his work on State of the Art. The band received their seventh ARIA in 2014 when Walking Under Stars won in the Best Urban Album category at the 28th ARIA Awards. In October 2026, a lane in Adelaide city centre was officially renamed Hilltop Hoods Lane.

== History ==
=== 1997–2001: Formation and early years ===
Two of Hilltop Hoods' founders first met in early 1990s when MC Suffa (aka Matthew David Lambert) and Pressure (Daniel Howe Smith) attended Blackwood High School in Eden Hills – a suburb of Adelaide. In 1996 they joined up with DJ Next (Ben John Hare) through a mutual friend and formed an Australian hip hop group. Their name was supplied by fellow local MC Flak (from Cross Bred Mongrels) – the suburb of Blackwood is known by locals as the Hilltop. The band's influences include American hip hop artists: Notorious B.I.G., KRS-One, Gang Starr, Wu-Tang Clan and Public Enemy.

At live shows DJ Next was the group's DJ, for recording he contributed audio engineering and all the scratching/turntablism on their early works. He regularly competed in the local DMC World DJ Championships (DMC) tournaments, winning the South Australian DMC championships multiple times. Hilltop Hoods recorded a demo, Highlanders, which was released on cassette tape only. As well as Pressure and Suffa on vocals, the group included MC Summit aka DJ Sum-1, but he did not appear on later Hilltop Hoods work.

The group's first official release in 1997, available on vinyl and cassette only, was a seven-track extended play, Back Once Again. Production was handled by DJ Debris (Barry John M Francis), turntablism and audio engineering by DJ Next, vocals by Pressure and Suffa. The third track, "Shades of Grey", features Debris with a verse, and was co-written by Francis, Hare, Lambert and Smith. Fifth track, "Mankind Must Suffa" also features a guest verse from Quromystix (aka Quro, Andrew Michael Bradley) – a member of Finger Lickin' Good and later the Fuglemen. "Mankind Must Suffa" is credited to Lambert, Smith, Francis and Bradley. Back Once Again is out of print and unavailable for retail purchase.

The group's debut studio album, A Matter of Time, was released in 1999 on CD only. As with Back Once Again, it is now unavailable for retail purchase. All scratching/turntablism is performed by DJ Next, a track, "Let Me Show You", has no vocals – solely showcasing his turntable skills. American MC Bukue One (Tion Torrence) appears for a guest verse on "Deaf Can Hear". The track is credited to Lambert, Smith, Francis, Hare and Torrence. The album was released independently but with financial assistance from Arts SA – the band were inspired, in 2005, to set up their own Hilltop Hoods Initiative, to help local artists. After the album appeared, DJ Next left the group and moved to Melbourne. In 2004 he moved to London. In 1999 Debris, who was also a member of the Cross Bred Mongrels, replaced Next and became the Hilltop Hoods' full-time DJ.

Hilltop Hoods founded the Certified Wise Crew – a hip-hop collaborative – with local groups Terra Firma, Cross Bred Mongrels and After Hours. Certified Wise Crew has since expanded to include MCs Trauma, Blockade, Kolaps, Flea, with Vents and Funkoars joining in later years. Hilltop Hoods received two nominations for the Hip Hop Act of the Year Award at the Australian Dance Music Awards and again at the 3D World Music Awards in 2001 and 2002. In 2001 the group's second album, Left Foot, Right Foot, was released with Lambert, Francis and M. Veraquth producing.

=== 2003–2007: The Calling and The Hard Road ===
On 22 September 2003, Hilltop Hoods released their third album, The Calling, which became a commercial breakthrough. In an interview after the release of their fourth album, Suffa revealed that The Calling was recorded on his mother's computer and the simplicity of their 'studio' is the reason why some of the music on the album is in monaural ('mono') sound.

The Calling entered the ARIA Albums Chart in March 2004 and reached No. 53 before exiting the top 100 in September of the same year. By December 2006 it was certified platinum for shipment of 70,000 units, becoming the first Australian hip hop album to achieve platinum status. In March 2012, it re-entered the chart and peaked at No. 50 – eight-and-a-half years after its first release. It featured two singles, "The Nosebleed Section" and "Dumb Enough", which were listed in the Triple J Hottest 100, 2003. Furthermore, "The Nosebleed Section" was ranked No. 17 in the Triple J Hottest 100 of All Time in 2009 and No. 2 in the Triple J Hottest 100 of Australian Songs.

Hilltop Hoods' chart and commercial success was a turning point in the Australian Hip Hop scene because it demonstrated widespread support for the genre that reached beyond an underground fan base.

On 1 April 2006, the group followed with their fourth album, The Hard Road, which peaked at No. 1. It was the first Australian hip hop album to do so. It was certified gold within a week of being released. Its lead single, "Clown Prince", reached the top 30 on the related ARIA Singles Chart. It featured guest verses from a New York rapper, Omni, and British MCs Mystro and Braintax. The Hilltop Hoods received the inaugural Australian Independent Record (AIR) Award for Independent Artist of the Year and Best Performing Independent Album for The Hard Road in 2006. The track, "The Blue Blooded", is a collaboration with Australian MCs: Funkoars, Hau from Koolism, Mortar, Vents, Drapht, Muph & Plutonic, Pegz and Robby Balboa. On 27 April of the same year, Hilltop Hoods performed at the Bass in the Grass music festival in Darwin alongside fellow hip hop group, The Herd. That same day they issued a second single, the title track from the album. Its video includes fellow members from the Certified Wise Crew – Cross Bred Mongrels, Terrafirma and Funkoars.

Following the success of The Hard Road Tour in early 2006, the Hilltop Hoods began their second national tour for the year, The Stopping All Stations Tour, which visited more regional areas of Australia as well as the capital cities. They were supported by Koolism and Mystro. Late that year, Hilltop Hoods released their third single from the album, "What a Great Night". The video shows the group at a club with camera shots panning up and down to reveal a new location. It used special effects and is one of the most expensive video clips for an Australian hip hop group, mirroring the group's rise in success and popularity. Also late in the year the band won the J Award for best album of the year from Triple J. They performed the Homebake Festival and Falls Festival before the end of the year. The Hard Road received the AIR Award for Best Independent Hip Hop/Urban Release in 2007.

=== 2007–2009: The Hard Road Restrung and State of the Art ===
On 12 May 2007, Hilltop Hoods released their next album The Hard Road: Restrung which is a remix of their previous studio album, The Hard Road, featuring the Adelaide Symphony Orchestra and Okwerdz. It peaked at No. 8 on the ARIA Albums Chart. Like its predecessor The Hard Road, it took out "Best Urban Release" at the ARIA Awards of 2007, with the group going back-to-back in the category. The lead single from the album "Recapturing the Vibe Restrung", its video clip was on high rotation on rage and jtv. That year the group performed at the Southbound Festival (WA), The Great Escape at Newington Armory over Easter, and embarked on a UK tour with a Sydney-based string quartet. They finished the year by headlining the Pyramid Rock Festival on Victoria's Phillip Island over New Year's Eve 2007. In 2008 they performed at the Big Day Out festivals, at Glastonbury Festival and Islington Academy in London. In December their DVD, The City of Light, was released and was nominated as Best Music DVD at the 2008 ARIA Awards.

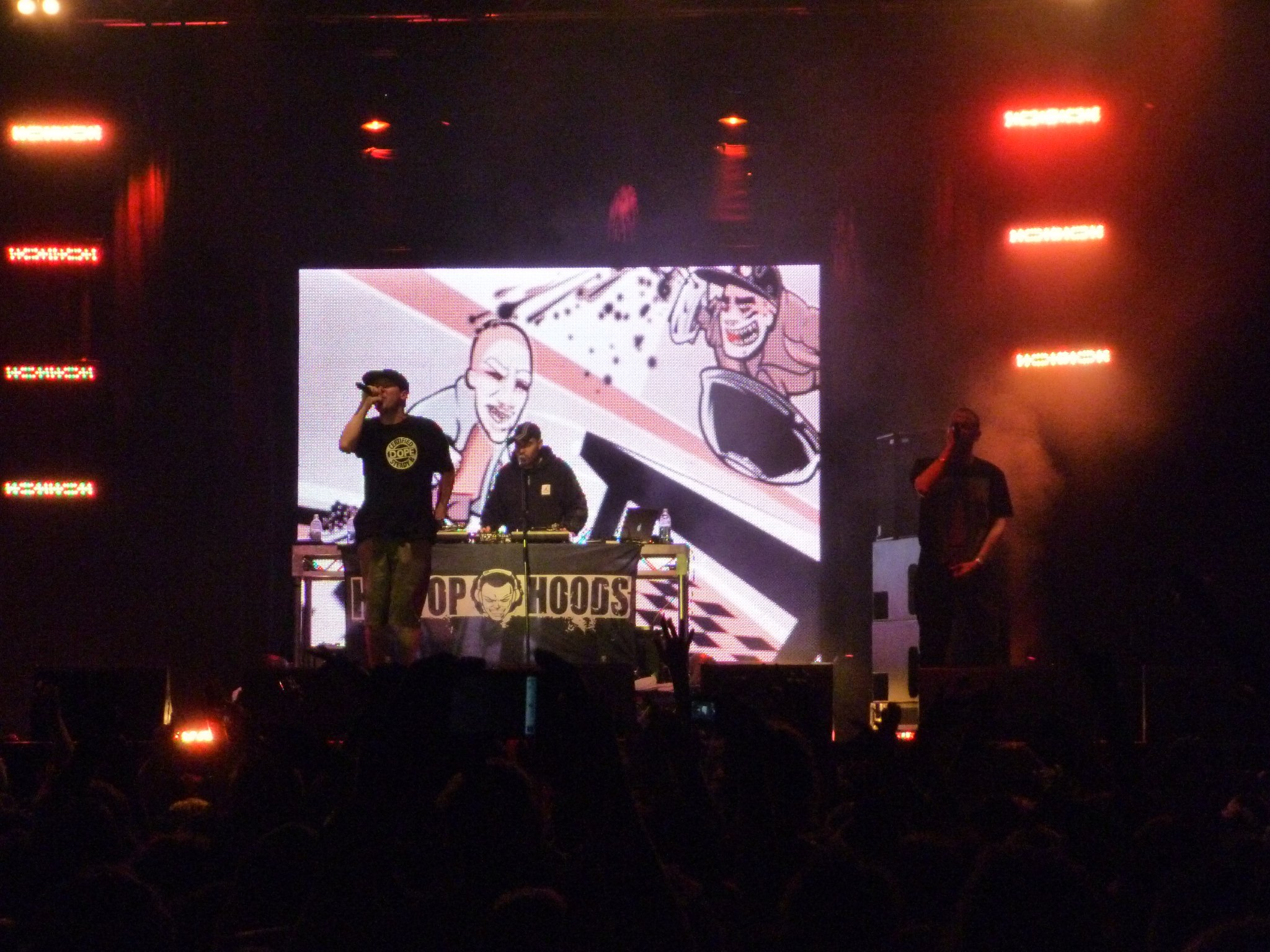
Hilltop Hoods performing at the One Movement Music Festival in October 2009, Inglewood, Western Australia.

Hilltop Hoods left their longtime home of Obese Records to start their own label, Golden Era Records, to release their future material. In November 2008 Pressure announced on Triple J's breakfast program that the next studio album, State of the Art, would be recorded with session musicians: "We realised with this one after doing Restrung and having an orchestra that we were a bit less limited. So we're going to have some session musos come in on this one and stuff like that". The album was released on 12 June, with the lead single, "Chase That Feeling", issued as a digital download on 8 May, and featured a return guest appearance by a quartet from the Adelaide Symphony Orchestra. The album debuted at number one on the albums chart while "Chase That Feeling" peaked at No. 8 on the related singles chart. By 2010 State of the Art was certified 2× platinum for shipment of 140,000 units.

In early 2009 the Hilltop Hoods performed at the Groovin the Moo festival in Townsville, Maitland and Bendigo. They also performed at Triple J's One Night Stand in Sale, Victoria on 30 May, and at Fat as Butter festival in Newcastle on 25 October where they played several of the tracks from the album. To promote its release the band started a national tour starting on 18 July and performed at most major cities including state capitals. The second national tour that year followed on 11 November with support provided by Vents.

=== 2010–2017: Drinking from the Sun and Walking Under Stars ===
On 28 July 2010, Hilltop Hoods completed work on a zombie movie, Parade of the Dead. Filmed mostly in Adelaide, the former Adelaide Gaol was used as a "key location". Spirit Films and Oasis Post, divisions of Adelaide-based Kojo, created DVD and Blu-Ray releases of the film. Shot using 15 cameras of various types, the film comprises a zombie apocalypse inter-cut with footage of a live concert by the Hoods at the Gaol. Designed for release just before Halloween, the film was only the second made by an Australian group on Blu-Ray (the other being AC/DC). Richard Coburn of Oasis Post directed, edited, and designed the film. It was co-written by Coburn, Scott Dooley, and Matt Lambert, and is over an hour long. Using the title from a State of the Art track, it was released on 22 October with the eponymous single.

In late November 2011, the band premiered the single, "I Love It", on the Triple J breakfast show. Featuring Sia, the song peaked at No. 6 on the ARIA chart and was the lead single from their sixth album, Drinking from the Sun, which was released on 9 March 2012. During December 2011, they supported Eminem and Lil Wayne during the Australian leg of Eminem's world tour. The song has since been certified 4× Platinum by ARIA, denoting sales of more than 280,000 units.

Three music videos for "I Love It" were published online in December 2011 by DJ Debris. Three versions were commissioned by the band, involving three different directors: Nash Edgerton of Blue Tongue Films; the Animal Logic animation company; and independent Melbourne, Australia, film-maker Carl Allison.

In January 2012, the group "leaked" a song from the sixth album following the emergence of interest on their Facebook page: "Let's have some fun. If we get 5000 likes on this post we're going to leak a track off Drinking from the Sun"—they received more than 7,500 likes within 10 minutes. Surprised with the magnitude of the response, the band subsequently posted: "Wow. Give me a minute." and posted a link to a new track, "Rattling the Keys to the Kingdom", on YouTube shortly afterward. "Rattling the Keys to the Kingdom" was certified Gold by ARIA in 2018.

Drinking from the Sun became their third number-one album in Australia and also charted on the New Zealand Albums Chart top 40. In mid-April 2012, the music video for "Speaking in Tongues", the album's second single, was published online. Directed by Toby Grimes, the video features Chali 2na and graffiti murals from Brisbane, Australia, artist Sofles.

On 10 May 2012, Hilltop Hoods issued a new EP, The Good Life in the Sun, to celebrate the launch of the 'Speaking in Tongues Tour', which includes tracks from Drinking from the Sun remixed by Suffa. The post contained a link to their website where the EP can be downloaded for free. In July 2012, the video for the third single, "Shredding the Balloon", was published on the band's YouTube channel. Directed by Selina Miles of Unity Sound and Visual, the video had received nearly 1.5 million views as of 1 October 2014. The single was released on 20 July 2012.

In August 2012, Triple J uploaded video footage of the group's tribute to Beastie Boys' member Adam "MCA" Yauch, who died in May 2012. The group selected "So What'cha Want" from Beastie Boys' album Check Your Head.

In late September, the music video for "Rattling the Keys to the Kingdom" was published online. It featured numerous Australian hip-hop artists, including Drapht, Urthboy, Def Wish Cast, Dazastah, Layla, Maya Jupiter and Hunter. The band explained in the production notes for the video:

Not only did we want to do something unifying, we also wanted to use the platform we have to promote artists that we think deserve more exposure. Of course, not everyone involved in the filmclip needs exposure, as many of the artists involved have huge followings in their own right. But having these artists involved in the filmclip just further serves to unify and consolidate the scene ... We need to point out that this is by no means a representation of every relevant artist involved in the culture past or present. It's more a cross-section of who we have contact with, who was available and so on.

In November 2012, Hilltop Hoods performed a live show on UStream and announced that the title of the group's next album would be Walking Under Stars—this was then confirmed on the official Hilltop Hoods Twitter and Facebook pages, following their Best Urban Album win at the 2012 ARIA Awards ceremony. The band's Facebook post read:

So it's now one year to the day since we dropped 'I Love It' and started the 'Drinking from the Sun' journey. Thanks to everyone that's supported us over the last 12 months, it's been amazing. We hope you join us late next year for 'Walking Under Stars'. Thankyou, Suffa, Pressure & Debris

The announcement corresponds with a sample on Drinking from the Sun that refers to a band writing with the clear intention of formulating enough material for two albums: "They were recording enough for two albums; that was premeditated." The sample appears on the track, "The Thirst Pt. 3 (Interlude)".

In April 2013, the Hilltop Hoods stated that the development of Walking Under Stars was "well underway", with the trio calling the album Drinking from the Sun "part two"—the latter received a double platinum sales certification in the same month. Additionally, American clothing company Zoo York announced a partnership with the Hilltop Hoods in April 2013, in preparation for the brand's 20th-anniversary celebrations in 2014. Lambert explained: "We've always been fans of Zoo York, they understand hip hop culture, and that's why we can't wait to work with them."

On 21 June 2014—after the band successfully received the 20,000 likes they requested for a Facebook post—the first preview of Walking Under Stars, titled "The Art of the Handshake", was uploaded to the band's SoundCloud profile—the song is the fourth on the album's track-list. Lambert revealed on 6 August that the song was inspired by the Notes to Self song "All of the Above", which reminded him of "the ridiculous handshakes" of his youth. As part of the songwriting process, Lambert spent a day researching the status of the handshake in countries such as Sweden and India.

The album's first official single, "Won't Let You Down"—featuring Irish singer Maverick Sabre—was released on 27 June 2014. Writing for the Faster Louder website, Matt Shea revealed in early August that the first single was met with a mixed reaction from existing fans of the band: "While many loved it, plenty of Hoods fans at the very least declared it a radio friendly single that had little to do with hip-hop. Others outright disliked it." Lambert explained in media interviews during the week prior to the album's release that the song was recorded at the Red Bull Studios in both London, UK and New York City, US, while the lyrical content is about the partners of the band members and the difficulties of being in a relationship with touring musicians. The single's musical content features Italian singer Zucchero Fornaciari singing a rendition of Ph.D's hit "I Won't Let You Down".

During the band's performance at the 2014 Splendour in the Grass festival, held from 25 to 27 July in Byron Bay, Australia, Lambert exclaimed to the audience prior to the song "Speaking in Tongues", from the Drinking from the Sun album:

The Hilltop Hoods do not give a fuck what race you are! The Hilltop Hoods do not give a fuck what religion you are! The Hilltop Hoods do not give a fuck what sex you are! The Hilltop Hoods do not give a fuck what sexuality you are! We are one people under the music!

Lambert explained that his announcement, a reaffirmation of the sentiment in "Speaking in Tongues", is "very important" to the band.

The band announced the release date for Walking Under Stars as 8 August 2014 in mid-July and, while the album is a Golden Era Records recording, Universal Music Australia acquired the exclusive licensing rights for the domestic market—Universal will also use the license to distribute the album in Canada, Austria, Germany, Switzerland, the United Kingdom, New Zealand and Benelux, while Golden Era continues its partnership with Fontana for the US release. Walking Under Stars was conceived before Drinking From the Sun was written and Lambert referred to the former as "a companion piece" in an August 2014 interview. Lambert also explained that "I'm a Ghost" is four-years-old, while a segment of "Brainbox" originally appeared on the 2012 Golden Era mixtape.

Similar to the band's previous album releases, numerous collaborators appear on Walking Under Stars. Lambert explained on 5 August that "we [Hilltop Hoods] try to do it in the same room" when guest artists record and, for the seventh studio album, the band worked with Sabre, New Zealand soul singer Aaradhna, Brother Ali, Dan Sultan, Drapht, Canadian voice-over artist Dave Pettitt and One Above, the Adelaide producer who also worked on Drinking from the Sun. Lambert explained to The Music magazine that Sultan is a "gifted" artist who the band loves "as a person as well", and "it was really good to work with [Brother] Ali, who's an artist that we admire so much."

Walking Under Stars debuted in the number-one position of the ARIA album charts during the week beginning 11 August 2014, providing the band with their fourth chart-topping album since The Hard Road in April 2006. As of 16 August 2014, the Hilltop Hoods have garnered a total of six weeks at the top of the ARIA charts from four number-one albums, three of which are Golden Era Records releases. During the promotion for a national Australian tour in late August 2014, the band revealed that a secret release will "manifest itself" in 2015 and will be the culmination of a multi-album creative project that began with Drinking From The Sun.

Hilltop Hoods performed "Won't Let You Down" live on the Australian Football League (AFL) television programme The Footy Show on 7 August 2014, filmed in Adelaide. The music video for "Won't Let You Down" was published on the Hilltop Hoods YouTube channel on 19 August 2014. Directed by Richard Coburn of the Kojo production company, the video features a narrative in which manufactured pigs heads are used.

The music video for the "Cosby Sweater" single was released on the Hilltop Hoods YouTube channel while the group was engaged in the third stage of their 2014 world tour in North America. Published on 15 September, the video was again directed by Coburn and also features Golden Era artists Briggs, K21 and Trials. The single became the group's first top 5 ARIA single on 15 November 2014, during the fourth, Australian stage of the world tour, on the same date as the group's Melbourne performance at the Rod Laver Arena. "Cosby Sweater" was also performed at the 28th ARIA Awards ceremony on 26 November 2014, where the band also won the Best Urban Album award.

On 30 April 2016, Hilltop Hoods performed their final concert of the 'Drinking from the Sun, Walking Under the Stars' at Perth Arena.

=== 2018–2024: The Great Expanse ===
On 13 July 2018, Hilltop Hoods released single "Clark Griswold" with Adrian Eagle, an ode to the character from the National Lampoon's Vacation movies.

On 23 November 2018, Hilltop Hoods released the single "Leave Me Lonely" and announced their forthcoming 2019 album The Great Expanse. The album, which features platinum single "Leave Me Lonely," gold selling ARIA Award-winning single "Clark Griswold" ft. Adrian Eagle, and new single "Exit Sign" ft. Illy and Ecca Vandal, was released on 22 February 2019 and debuted at No. 1 on the ARIA Albums Charts. The chart debut made it the group's sixth number one, setting a new ARIA record for most No. 1 Albums by an Australian band or group.

On 17 March 2022, the Hilltop Hoods released a new single with US soul singer Eamon titled "Show Business".

On 15 May 2022, Hilltop Hoods celebrated the 15th anniversary of The Hard Road Restrung with a post on their official Facebook & Instagram pages, and announced they were working on a third installment in their 'restrung' releases, following The Hard Road Restrung (2007) and Drinking from the Sun and Walking Under Stars Restrung (2016). Accompanying photos of both of their previous restrung album covers, was an image containing songs for the third installment, which suggests the new restrung album will be "The Great Expanse Restrung". The post clarified that the album "won't be out anytime soon".

On 25 August 2022, Hilltop Hoods reunited with Montaigne and Tom Thum and released the song "A Whole Day's Night".

=== 2025-present: Fall from the Light ===
On 15 June 2023, the Hilltop Hoods released the single "Laced Up".

In December 2023, Hilltop Hoods released an Instagram post promising a new album would be released in 2024. However, they failed to fulfill this promise, stating in December 2024 that the album was "nearly there" and uploading an image implying a 2025 release date.

On 6 February 2025, Hilltop Hoods released their new single "The Gift", featuring Marlon. On the same day, they announced on their Instagram that the next album would release in 2025 and described "The Gift" as the cornerstone of the new album.

On 28 May 2025, the band announced the release of their 9th studio album, Fall from the Light, on 1 August 2025. Suffa, Pressure, and DJ Debris recorded the album in Adelaide, Darwin, Melbourne, and New Zealand. The album has 12 tracks, and features Adelaide pop artist Nyassa and New Zealand pop band Six60. Another track, "Don't Happy, Be Worry", was released ahead of the album.

== Touring ==
Hilltop Hoods have toured both in Australia and overseas, including playing at music festivals: T in the Park, Oxegen, the Big Day Out, Adelaide 500, Southbound, The Great Escape, Splendour in the Grass, Bassinthegrass, Groovin' The Moo, Falls Festival, Pyramid Rock Festival, Rollercoaster, Come Together Festival and Make Poverty History.

On 8 December 2012, the Hilltop Hoods were one of two headlines acts (the other was American band, Blondie) for the 2012 "Global Edition" of the popular Australian music, film, comedy and arts festival, Homebake.

A North American "Drinking From The Sun" tour was announced in late February 2013 and the band revealed that it would perform in American cities such as Seattle (the tour's debut location), New York and San Francisco, and the Canadian cities, Vancouver, Montreal, Calgary and Toronto; the tour was scheduled to end in Los Angeles on 9 May 2013. However, on 23 February 2013, the hip hop group announced the indefinite postponement of the entire tour due to a "serious family matter". The Hilltop Hoods were also one of the bands on the "Concerts" roster for the V8 Clipsal 500 Adelaide car racing event, held between 28 February 2013 and 3 March 2013—other Australian hip hop artists, such as Drapht and Vents, also performed at the event.

The group performed at the 2014 occurrence of the Australian festival Splendour in the Grass, performing alongside other musicians, such as Illy, Outkast, and Lily Allen. The band announced an August–September 2014 North American tour in June 2014—including dates in Vancouver and Toronto, Canada, and San Francisco, US—with Minnesota, US, artist Sims, from Doomtree.

In late August 2014, the "Cosby Sweater Australian Tour" was announced in support of the Walking Under Stars album release. The domestic tour run from October to December 2014, and the support acts were Thundamentals and K21.

Their latest national tour was in 2016. This was the "Drinking from the sun and Walking Under Stars Australian Sympthony Orchestra tour" This was the tour that followed the release of the new album which was the 2 most recent albums remastered using the orchestra.

In February 2019, the group supported Eminem's concert tour around Australia and New Zealand, performing to audiences in venues such as ANZ Stadium in Sydney and the MCG in Melbourne.

Hilltop Hoods undertook a national tour in late 2022, commencing in Brisbane on 27 August, with performances in Sydney, Melbourne, Perth and concluding in Adelaide. A further tour of New Zealand was undertaken in September 2023.

== Members ==
Current members

- Suffa (Matthew David Lambert) – vocals, engineering, mixing, producing (1996–present)
- Pressure (Daniel Howe Smith) – vocals (1996–present)
- DJ Debris (Barry John M Francis) – producing, engineering, turntablism (1999–present)

Former members

- DJ Next (Ben John Hare) – audio engineering, DJing, turntablism, scratching (1996–1999)
- MC Summit aka DJ Sum-1 – vocals (ca. 1996)

== Discography ==
- A Matter of Time (1999)
- Left Foot, Right Foot (2001)
- The Calling (2003)
- The Hard Road (2006)
- State of the Art (2009)
- Drinking from the Sun (2012)
- Walking Under Stars (2014)
- The Great Expanse (2019)
- Fall from the Light (2025)

== Recognition and awards ==
Hilltop Hoods are regarded as pioneers of the "larrikin-like" style of Australian hip hop.

They received nominations for the Best Hip Hop Act in 2001 and 2002 at the 3D World Dance Music Awards. They won the Australasian Performing Right Association (APRA) Award for Best Upcoming Group.

In December 2020, the Hilltop Hoods were listed at number 27 in Rolling Stone Australia's "50 Greatest Australian Artists of All Time" issue.

On 26 July 2025, "The Nosebleed Section" was voted to 2nd place (after INXS's "Never Tear Us Apart") in Triple J's Hottest 100 of Australian Songs . With three tracks voted into the Triple J Hottest 100 in January 2026, making a total of 27 songs since their first appearance in 2003, the band hold the record for the most recurrent artist in the history of the annual countdown.

In March 2026, Adelaide City Lord Mayor Jane Lomax-Smith announced that a laneway in Adelaide city centre, Clubhouse Lane, would be named Hilltop Hoods Lane later in the year. They are the sixth South Australian artists to receive a named laneway under the City of Music, joining The Angels, No Fixed Address, Paul Kelly, Cold Chisel, and Sia Furler. The lane was officially named on 15 October 2026.

=== AIR Awards ===
The Australian Independent Record Awards (commonly known informally as AIR Awards) is an annual awards night to recognise, promote and celebrate the success of Australia's Independent Music sector.

Year	Nominee / work	Award	Result
2006	The Hard Road	Best Performing Independent Album	Won
2006	"Clown Prince"	Best Performing Independent Single	Nominated
2006	themselves	Independent Artist of the Year	Won
2007	The Hard Road Restrung	Best Independent Album	Nominated
2007	The Hard Road Restrung	Best Independent Dance/Electronic Album	Nominated
2007	themselves	Independent Artist of the Year	Nominated

=== APRA Awards ===
The APRA Awards are presented annually from 1982 by the Australasian Performing Right Association (APRA), "honouring composers and songwriters".

Year	Nominee / work	Award	Result	Ref.
2010	"Still Standing"	Urban Work of the Year	Won	
2011	"Light You Burned"	Urban Work of the Year	Nominated	
2012	"I Love It" (featuring Sia)	Song of the Year	Shortlisted	
2013	"I Love It" (featuring Sia)	Most Played Australian Work	Nominated	
2013	"I Love It" (featuring Sia)	Urban Work of the Year	Won	
2013	"Speaking in Tongues"	Urban Work of the Year	Nominated	
2015	"Cosby Sweater"	Song of the Year	Shortlisted	
2015	"Won't Let You Down" (featuring Maverick Sabre)	Urban Work of the Year	Nominated	
2020	"Exit Sign" by Hilltop Hoods featuring Illy and Ecca Vandal	Song of the Year	Shortlisted	
2020	"Exit Sign" by Hilltop Hoods featuring Illy and Ecca Vandal	Urban Work of the Year	Nominated	
2020	"Leave Me Lonely"	Urban Work of the Year	Won	
2020	Hilltop Hoods (Barry Francis p.k.a. DJ Debris, Matthew Lambert p.k.a. Suffa, Daniel Smith p.k.a. MC Pressure)	Songwriter of the Year	Won	
2021	"I'm Good"	Song of the Year	Shortlisted	
2023	"Show Business" (feat. Eamon)	Most Performed Hip Hop/ Rap Work of the Year	Nominated	
2024	"Laced Up"	Most Performed Hip Hop/Rap Work	Nominated	
2026	"Never Coming Home" ((featuring Six60)	Song of the Year	Shortlisted	
2026	"The Gift" by Hilltop Hoods featuring Marlon Motlop	Most Performed Hip Hop / Rap Work	Nominated	

=== ARIA Awards ===
In 2006 Hilltop Hoods were nominated for five ARIA Awards – the first ever for an Australian hip hop group – winning in two categories: 'Best Urban Release' and 'Best Independent Release'. The following year they won 'Best Urban Release' at the ARIA Awards for The Hard Road: Restrung. The album was also nominated for 'Best Independent Release' and 'Best Cover Art' by John Engelhardt. The DVD City of Light was nominated as 'Best Music DVD' at the 2008 ARIA awards. At the 2009 ARIA Awards they won 'Best Urban Album' for a third time – for State of the Art and DJ Debris won an award for 'Engineer of the Year' for his work on that album. At the ARIA Music Awards of 2012, Hilltop Hoods won its fourth award in the 'Best Urban Album' category for Drinking from the Sun; as of November 2012, the group has won six awards from twenty nominations.

At the 2012 ARIA Awards, established Aboriginal Australian band, Yothu Yindu, was inducted into the Hall of Fame. A photograph of Suffa holding the award in the presence of the band was posted on the Hilltop Hoods' Instagram profile, accompanied by the following comment: "A memory I'll take to the grave. Meeting Yothu Yindi and having them let me hold their Hall of Fame ARIA. What a beautiful induction."

The band was nominated in three ARIA categories in 2014: Best Group, Best Urban Album, and Engineer of the Year. In an October 2014 radio interview, Smith said that the band does not expect to win an award, but wishes the best for the winners; however, the Best Urban Album award was given to the band on 26 November 2014, providing the band with their seventh ARIA award. As from November 2020 they have won ten awards from thirty-six nominations.

Year	Nominee / work	Award	Result	Ref.
2006	The Hard Road	Best Independent Release	Won	
2006	The Hard Road	Best Urban Album	Won	
2006	The Hard Road	Breakthrough Artist – Album	Nominated	
2006	"Clown Prince"	Breakthrough Artist – Single	Nominated	
2006	The Calling Live	Best Music DVD	Nominated	
2007	The Hard Road: Restrung	Best Independent Release	Nominated	
2007	The Hard Road: Restrung	Best Urban Album	Won	
2007	The Hard Road: Restrung – John Engelhardt	Best Cover Art	Nominated	
2008	The City of Light	Best Music DVD	Nominated	
2009	State of the Art	Highest Selling Album	Nominated	
2009	State of the Art	Best Urban Album	Won	
2009	State of the Art	Best Group	Nominated	
2009	"Chase That Feeling"	Single of the Year	Nominated	
2009	State of the Art – Suffa	Producer of the Year	Nominated	
2009	State of the Art – DJ Debris	Engineer of the Year	Won	
2012	Drinking from the Sun	Best Group	Nominated	
2012	Drinking from the Sun	Best Urban Album	Won	
2012	"I Love It" (featuring Sia)	Song of the Year	Nominated	
2012	"I Love It" (featuring Sia) – Animal Logic	Best Video	Nominated	
2012	Drinking From The Sun	Best Australian Live Act	Nominated	
2014	Walking Under Stars	Engineer of the Year	Nominated	
2014	Walking Under Stars	Best Urban Album	Won	
2014	Walking Under Stars	Best Group	Nominated	
2015	Cosby Sweater Australian Tour	Best Australian Live Act	Nominated	
2016	"1955" (featuring Montaigne and Tom Thum)	Song of the Year	Nominated	
2016	"1955" (featuring Montaigne and Tom Thum)	Best Video	Nominated	
2016	The Restrung Tour	Best Australian Live Act	Won	
2018	"Clark Griswold" (featuring Adrian Eagle)	Best Urban Release	Won	
2019	The Great Expanse	Album of the Year	Nominated	
2019	The Great Expanse	Best Group	Nominated	
2019	The Great Expanse	Best Hip Hop Release	Nominated	
2019	"Leave Me Lonely"	Song of the Year	Nominated	
2019	"Exit Sign" (featuring Illy and Ecca Vandal)	Best Video	Nominated	
2019	The Great Expanse World Tour	Best Australian Live Act	Won	
2019	Plutonic Lab for Hilltop Hoods' The Great Expanse	Engineer of the Year	Nominated	
2020	"Exit Sign" (featuring Illy and Ecca Vandal)	Song of the Year	Nominated	
2025	Fall from the Light	Best Group	Nominated	
2025	Fall from the Light	Best Hip Hop/Rap Release	Nominated	
2025	Fall from the Light	Best Cover Art	Nominated	
2025	Roman Anastasios and Jordan Ruyi Blanch for Hilltop Hoods – "Don't Happy, Be Worry"	Best Video	Nominated	
2025	Hilltop Hoods 2025	Best Australian Live Act	Nominated	
2026	"Never Coming Back"	Best Hip Hop/Rap Release	Nominated	
2026	Never Coming Home Tour	Best Australian Live Act	Nominated	

=== Fowler's Live Music Awards ===
The Fowler's Live Music Awards took place from 2012 to 2014 to "recognise success and achievement over the past 12 months [and] celebrate the great diversity of original live music" in South Australia. Since 2015 they're known as the South Australian Music Awards.

Year	Nominee / work	Award	Result (wins only)
2012	Hilltop Hoods	Best Hip Hop Artist	Won

=== J Awards ===
The J Awards are an annual series of Australian music awards that were established by the Australian Broadcasting Corporation's youth-focused radio station Triple J. They commenced in 2005.

Year	Nominee / work	Award	Result
2014	Walking Under Stars	Australian Album of the Year	Nominated
2019	A Great Expanse	Australian Album of the Year	Nominated

=== National Live Music Awards ===
The National Live Music Awards (NLMAs) are a broad recognition of Australia's diverse live industry, celebrating the success of the Australian live scene. The awards commenced in 2016.

Year	Nominee / work	Award	Result
2019	Hilltop Hoods	Live Hip Hop Act of the Year	Nominated

== Other projects ==
=== Hilltop Hoods Initiative ===
In 2005 the annual "Hilltop Hoods Initiative" was established in association with Arts SA, made possible by a donation from the Hilltop Hoods. Valued at A$10,000 (originally $3000), the Hilltop Hoods initiative helped young and emerging South Australian hip-hop artists to manufacture and distribute a CD. The initiative also included two mentorship sessions with Hilltop Hoods' former manager, PJ Murton. It acknowledges the important role South Australian government assistance played in the development of the careers of the Hilltop Hoods. In 2009, the initiative became a national grant available to entry for any emerging Australian hip-hop artist who have not issued a professional album.

In a Hilltop Hoods newsletter, released on 4 December 2012, the group communicated the following announcement:

In 2013 The Hilltop Hoods and APRA are teaming up again to give a career changing $10K to the most impressive emerging Hip Hop/Soul act in Australia. Aimed at helping fund the manufacturing and marketing of an album release, the grant is open to any act who hasn't yet released anything professionally. Applications will open in early 2013 along with details on how to enter.

Recipients are:

- General Knowledge, a three-piece group (2006)
- Subsketch, a solo artist (2007)
- Jimblah, a solo artist (2008)
- K21, a solo artist (2009)
- 1/6, a solo artist (2010)
- Koolta, a solo artist (2011)
- Run for Your Life, a musical collective (2012)
- Chelsea Jane (2013), Gold Coast, Queensland artist
- I AM D (2014), Brisbane, Queensland solo artist
- Sarah Connor, a solo artist (2015)
- Astro Travellers, a seven-piece group (2016)
- MC Sinks, a solo artist from Melbourne, Victoria. (2017).

=== Hilltop Hoods Remix Shoe ===
The Hilltop Hoods and DC Shoes collaborated on the production of a limited-edition shoe called "The Hilltop Hoods Remix Shoe"—it was released in stores on 1 February 2008. They are the first Australian music group to design and release their own signature-model shoe. Illustration and Design by John Engelhardt injected its unique style

=== Golden Era Records ===
Following its departure from the Obese record label, the group launched its own label in 2009, entitled Golden Era Records. The label's title is described by the band on the label website:

To some people the golden era of Hip Hop was '94. Ask someone a little older and they'll tell you Hip Hop's renaissance was back in '88. Ask one of our revered pioneers and they'll tell you that the golden era came and went three decades ago, before most of today's Hip Hop heads were born. Whatever the case these so-called golden eras weren't only defined by the music or the fashion – they were characterised by something less tangible – an atmosphere, a movement.

This label wasn't established to release throw-back records; instead we hope to make music that throws you back to the way you felt during the golden era of Hip Hop.

Whatever year that was for you.

The label is based in Stirling, South Australia, and, as of December 2012, its roster consists of the Hilltop Hoods, Briggs, Funkoars, Vents, Adfu, K21, and most recently, Shadow.

In January 2012, Fontana, an independent marketing, sales and distribution company under the Universal Music Group umbrella, signed an exclusive agreement with Golden Era Records for the American release of Drinking From The Sun, as well as back catalogue titles.

=== Charity ===
The CanTeen youth cancer charity announced that the 2-CD fundraising album Australian Hip Hop Supports CanTeen had raised over AU$122,000 as of 15 October 2014. Released in late 2013, the album features contributions from Hilltop Hoods, as well as numerous other Australian hip-hop artists. The initiative was originally conceived of by Robert Hunter, an MC who rapped under the name "Hunter" (SBX), who died from cancer prior to the release of the album.

=== Through the Dark interactive film ===
On 11 November 2016 Hilltop Hoods released an interactive film called Through the Dark, which featured their song of the same name. The interactive film project was a collaboration with Google Play Music and was directed by Mike Daly.

== See also ==
- Adelaide Arts and Entertainment
- Adelaide Hills
- List of Australian hip hop musicians
- Music of Australia
