= Bukue One =

- Born: Tion Torrence
- Origin: San Francisco Bay Area, California
- Genre: Hip-hop
- Occupations: Rapper; songwriter; record producer; talent manager; graffiti artist; skater
- Years active: 1991–present
- Labels: S.I.N.G Productions; Sub Verse Music; Funnyman Entertainment; Autonomy Records

Logo

Tion Torrence, also known by his stage name Bukue One, is an American rapper, record producer, talent manager, graffiti artist, and skater from the San Francisco Bay Area.

== Career ==
=== Early life and skateboarding career ===
Both of his parents were members of the Black Panther Party, and his father was a backup singer for Marvin Gaye. In the early 1990s, he was sponsored by Alva Skates. In 1991, he was featured in parts of the skate videos "New School / Public - Minus One", "No Pools In This One", and "Here's Flaco" by New School Skateboards. In 1992, he was featured in "Disturbed" by Tracker Trucks.

=== Music career ===
In 1998, he founded Urban Productions and released his first mixtape Lastarfighta, followed by Lastarfighta #2 in 2000. He released several more mixtapes and singles in the following years. Multiple singles from his 2003 mixtape Rebirth Of The Last Starfighta (Tracks 17–33) are featured in the video game ESPN NBA 2K5, and he is a playable character on the Hieroglyphics team. In 2007, he released his debut album titled Intromission. The album was ranked the 68th best hip-hop album of 2007 by PopMatters. In 2012, his song "Beautiful Crime" with DJ Melrok was ranked one of the 25 best songs about graffiti by Complex. In addition to his own music career he has managed other artists, most notably Del the Funky Homosapien from 2002 to 2013.

=== Notable graffiti work ===
He has done a number of graffiti projects, mostly in the San Francisco Bay Area. In 2011, he created a burner with students of Santa Fe University of Art and Design. In 2021, he made a mural at Oracle Park, home of the San Francisco Giants. In 2022, his graffiti art was featured in the documentary "Thirteen Ways of Looking at Kasper's", which showcases the transformation of art at Original Kasper's Hot Dogs in Oakland since its abandonment in 2003. In 2023, he helped refurbish Starlite Child Development Center in Oakland, which was vandalized the previous year multiple times by other graffiti artists. Torrence's vibrant mural, included every letter of the alphabet in graffiti style writing.

== Discography ==
=== Mixtapes ===
- Laststarfighta (1999)
- Laststarfighta #2 (2000)
- Ecko Australia (limited edition) (2000)
- Triathalon (2002)
- Rebirth Of The Last Starfighta (Tracks 17–33) (2003)
- Foreign Exchange (Escape Routes) (as Esoteks with EMC) (2003)
- Hustlin' Like Raindrops Vol. 1 (with DJ Smoke) (2007)
- The Others… (2011)

=== Studio albums ===
- Intromission (2007)
- Laser Reyes (2010)
- Nome De Plume (2011)
- #Autonomy (2012)
- The Black Fletch (2014)
- And Then… (2016)
- Scenic Route (2020)
- THE Project (2025)
- Reclamation Sounds Vol. 1 (2025)

=== EPs ===
- Upper Playground (2003)
- The Doodle (2021)

=== Singles ===
- "Mash It Up!"/"Pressed Wax" (2002)
- "U Don't Know" (2003)
- "Watchmenow" (2004)
- "F'Real Version" (with Del the Funky Homosapien, Abstract Rude, Motion Man, EMC, Mikah 9 and Ammbush) (2004)
- "Who Wan Test" (2006)
- "Reporting Live" (with Ramallah Underground) (2006)
- "Still… (U Don't Know)" (2020)

=== Guest appearances ===
- "Deaf Can Hear" from A Matter of Time by Hilltop Hoods (1999)
- "Strike Bowling" from Rappin' Atchu by The Rappers (Jeff Spec and Moka Only) (2001)
- "Universal Message" from Making Tracks by Abstract Rude (2002)
- "Record and Perform" from Lab Down Under by The A-Team (Abstract Rude and Aceyalone) (2003)
- "Graffiti" from Culture by Lone Catalysts (J. Rawls and J. Sands) (2017)
