= Drinking from the Sun, Walking Under Stars Restrung =

Remix album by Hilltop Hoods
- Released: 19 February 2016
- Genre: Australian hip hop
- Length: 71:13
- Label: Golden Era

Hilltop Hoods chronology
Walking Under Stars (2014)	Drinking from the Sun, Walking Under Stars Restrung (2016)	The Great Expanse (2019)

Singles from Drinking from the Sun, Walking Under Stars Restrung
- 1. "Higher" Released: 3 December 2015; 2. "1955" Released: 8 February 2016

Drinking from the Sun, Walking Under Stars Restrung is a 2016 remix album from Australian hip hop group, Hilltop Hoods that follows their 2014 release Walking Under Stars and their 2012 release Drinking from the Sun. This is the second launch of a "restrung" album after The Hard Road: Restrung in 2007. The 19-track release features a collection of new tracks alongside singles such as "Cosby Sweater" and "I Love It". This is the second time Hilltop Hoods have collaborated with the 32-piece Adelaide Symphony Orchestra and one of many collaborations with arranger/composer Jamie Messager, but is the first collaboration with the 20-piece Adelaide Chamber Singer Choir and conductor Hamish Mackenzie. The song "Higher" is featured in Forza Horizon 3.

Coinciding with the album launch, Hilltop Hoods toured the Australian capital cities, they were accompanied by orchestras and choirs in those respective cities to bring the album to the people all across the nation. They were supported on tour by fellow Australian Hip-hop act A.B.Original and British pop singer and previous collaborator Maverick Sabre.

== Track listing ==
No.	Title	Length
1.	"The Thirst, Pt. 6"	2:58
2.	"Drinking from the Sun Restrung"	3:11
3.	"Higher" (featuring James Chatburn)	4:28
4.	"I Love It Restrung" (featuring Sia)	3:43
5.	"Live and Let Go Restrung" (featuring Maverick Sabre and Brother Ali)	5:22
6.	"Through the Dark (Reprise)"	0:54
7.	"Won't Let You Down Restrung" (featuring Maverick Sabre)	4:25
8.	"Speaking in Tongues Restrung" (featuring Chali 2na)	4:03
9.	"Cosby Sweater Restrung"	3:46
10.	"1955" (featuring Montaigne and Tom Thum)	3:59
11.	"Walking Under Stars Restrung"	3:44
12.	"Drinking from the Sun (Reprise)"	0:56
13.	"Lights Out Restrung"	3:31
14.	"Rattling the Keys to the Kingdom Restrung"	4:01
15.	"Through the Dark Restrung"	4:39
16.	"Shredding the Balloon Restrung"	5:01
17.	"I'm a Ghost Restrung"	4:27
18.	"The Thirst, Pt. 7"	3:23
19.	"Higher" (featuring James Chatburn) (Jayteehazard Remix)	4:42

== Charts ==
=== Weekly charts ===
Chart (2016)	Peak position
Australian Albums (ARIA)	1
Swiss Albums (Schweizer Hitparade)	50

=== Year-end charts ===
Chart (2016)	Position
Australian Albums (ARIA)	13
Chart (2018)	Position
Australian Albums (ARIA)	83
Chart (2019)	Position
Australian Albums (ARIA)	55
Chart (2020)	Position
Australian Albums (ARIA)	77

== Certifications ==
Region	Certification	Certified units/sales
Australia (ARIA)	Platinum	70,000^{^}
New Zealand (RMNZ)	Gold	7,500^{‡}
^{^} Shipments figures based on certification alone.^{‡} Sales+streaming figures based on certification alone.
