= The Calling (Hilltop Hoods album) =

Studio album by Hilltop Hoods
- Released: 22 September 2003
- Recorded: 2001–2003 various studios Adelaide
- Genre: Australian hip hop
- Length: 53:06
- Label: Obese
- Producer: Hilltop Hoods

Hilltop Hoods chronology
Left Foot, Right Foot (2001)	The Calling (2003)	The Hard Road (2006)

Singles from The Calling
- 1. "Testimonial Year" Released: 2003; 2. "Dumb Enough" Released: 2003; 3. "The Nosebleed Section" Released: 2003

Reissue cover
- 2009 reissue

Professional ratings
Review scores
Source	Rating
AllMusic	4/5 stars

The Calling is the third studio album by Australian hip hop group Hilltop Hoods and was released on 22 September 2003 through Obese Records. The success of the album was significant in the Australian hip-hop scene because it demonstrated popular recognition for a genre previously supported by a comparatively small, "underground" fan base.

Three singles were released as single and two placed in the 2003 Triple J Hottest 100 chart: "The Nosebleed Section" was voted into ninth place, while "Dumb Enough" was voted into position 44.

== Reception ==
In an interview after the release of their fourth album, Suffa revealed that The Calling was recorded on his mother's computer and the simplicity of their 'studio' is the reason why some of the music on the album is in monaural ('mono') sound.

On 26 July 2006, Obese Records announced that the album became the first Australian hip hop release to achieve a platinum certification. The album originally peaked at number 53 on the Australian Albums Chart in 2004 before re-entering the chart at number 50 in March 2012, following the release of the sixth Hilltop Hoods album, Drinking From the Sun.

== DVD ==
The Calling Live DVD is available on the Hoods website and includes: Live footage, Film clips, Remixes, Interviews, Outtakes and Photo Gallery.

== Track listing ==
No.	Title	Writer(s)	Length
0.	"Stay the Fuck Away Because I Spit When I'm Talking" (pregap track)		1:53
1.	"Incoming" (interlude)		0:16
2.	"Testimonial Year"	Matthew Lambert; Daniel Smith	3:39
3.	"The Calling"	Smith; Lambert	3:06
4.	"Dumb Enough"	Smith; Lambert	4:02
5.	"Illusionary Lines"	Smith	3:08
6.	"Tomorrow Will Do"	Smith; Lambert	3:13
7.	"Laying Blame"	Lambert; Smith	3:35
8.	"Simmy and the Gravespitter" (interlude)	Lambert	0:55
9.	"The Nosebleed Section"	Lambert	3:39
10.	"Down for the Cause" (featuring Hyjak and DJ Bonez)	Jack McCarthy; Smith; Lambert	3:59
11.	"Mic Felon"	Smith	2:51
12.	"Walk On" (featuring DJ Next)	Lambert; Smith	3:16
13.	"The Certificate" (featuring Certified Wise)	Lambert; Daniel Rankine; Kris Adams; Michael Leslie; K. Tinge; C. Green; Adam Baker; Barry Francis; Michael Veraguth; Andrew Simmons; B. Johncock; D. Evans; A. Raymond; H. Watson; Matthew Honson; Smith	6:26
14.	"Hilltop Hoods" (interlude)		0:31
15.	"Working the Mic"	Lambert; Smith	3:22
16.	"Outgoing" (interlude)		1:54
17.	"The Sentinel"	Lambert; Smith	5:12
Total length:			54:57

2003 release bonus tracks
No.	Title	Writer(s)	Length
18.	"Mic Felon" (remix)	Smith	2:38
19.	"The Certificate" (remix) (featuring Certified Wise)	Lambert; Rankine; Adams; Leslie; Tinge; Green; Baker; Francis; Veraguth; Simmons; Johncock; Evans; Raymond; Watson; Honson; Smith	6:01
Total length:			63:36

2009 reissue bonus track
No.	Title	Writer(s)	Length
18.	"Here Come the Girls"	Lambert; Smith	3:26
Total length:			58:23

Obese Records vinyl edition (Note: The vinyl edition has "All On Me" as the 13th of its 17 tracks. It excludes "The Sentinel", has "The Certificate" as the closing track.)
No.	Title	Writer(s)	Length
13.	"All On Me" (featuring Pegz and Layla)	Layla Hanbury; Lambert; Smith; Tirren Staaf	3:02
Total length:			52:47

== Charts ==
=== Weekly charts ===
Chart (2003–2012)	Peak position
Australian Albums (ARIA)	50

== Certifications ==
Region	Certification	Certified units/sales
Australia (ARIA)	Platinum	70,000^{^}
^{^} Shipments figures based on certification alone.
