= The Hard Road: Restrung =

Remix album by Hilltop Hoods
- Released: 23 May 2007
- Recorded: 2006–2007
- Studios: X-Bred Production Studios; Grainger Studios
- Genre: Australian hip hop
- Label: Obese
- Producer: Hilltop Hoods

Hilltop Hoods chronology
The Hard Road (2006)	The Hard Road: Restrung (2007)	State of the Art (2009)

Reissue cover
- 2009 reissue

Professional ratings
Review scores
Source	Rating
AllMusic	3.5/5 stars
RapReviews	8/10

The Hard Road: Restrung is a remix of Hilltop Hoods' previous album The Hard Road, featuring the Adelaide Symphony Orchestra and American freestyle rapper Okwerdz.

The album was released on 12 May 2007 in Australia, with a launch show and one-off performance with the Adelaide Symphony Orchestra at the Entertainment Centre on the release date. International guests Okwerdz and Mystro performed as a surprise for fans; they were not advertised on the bill. The performance was recorded, and will be feature on a DVD along with footage from recent Hilltop Hoods performances.

The album debuted at number 8 on the ARIA Albums Chart and was certified gold. The Hard Road: Restrung won the award for Best Urban Album at the 2007 ARIA Awards.

== Album development ==
The Hard Road: Restrung was brought about in part by the Hilltop Hoods' performance with the string section of the Adelaide Symphony Orchestra during the 2006 ARIA Awards, where they performed "The Hard Road".

Two tracks were not included from the original album The Hard Road: "Blue Blooded" and "Circuit Breaker". This was down to the very nature of hip hop: "you are speeding things up or slowing them down when you sample them and that changes pitch. We had to pitch-shift entire songs so they were in tune with the orchestra and it just didn't work with those songs.".

The Hard Road: Restrung has a new order of tracks and also contains one new track "Roll on Up".

"Stopping All Stations" and "What a Great Night" also have new verses by Suffa on the former and Pressure on the latter.

The album was released in a censored format:

"we were working under the assumption that it was a requirement of working with the Adelaide Symphony Orchestra. Turns out that it wasn't (they've been really cool to work with, really flexible and laid back). By the time we found this out it was way too late in the mixing process to go back and change the edits."

== Singles ==
"Recapturing The Vibe Restrung" was released as a single and a video was made and uploaded to YouTube on 13 December 2007.

== Track listing ==
The Hard Road: Restrung
No.	Title	Writer(s)	Length
0.	Untitled	Matthew Lambert, Daniel Smith, Barry Francis, Kevin Amarfio and Joe Christie
1.	"The Hard Road Restrung" (contains a sample of "Out in the Woods" by Leon Russell)	Matthew Lambert, Daniel Smith and Barry Francis	3:37
2.	"Stopping All Stations Restrung" (contains a sample from the Herbie Mann recording "The Night They Drove Old Dixie Down" by Robbie Robertson)	Matthew Lambert, Daniel Smith and Barry Francis	3:36
3.	"Conversations from a Speakeasy Restrung" (featuring Okwerdz and Omni)	Matthew Lambert, Daniel Smith, Barry Francis and J. McDonald, B.E Peeples	3:25
4.	"An Audience with the Devil Restrung"	Matthew Lambert, Daniel Smith, Barry Francis and Daniel Rankine	3:34
5.	"Monsters Ball Restrung"	Matthew Lambert, Daniel Smith, Barry Francis and Adam Simmonds	3:58
6.	"Breathe Restrung"	Matthew Lambert, Daniel Smith and Barry Francis	3:50
7.	"Another Great Intro"		0:18
8.	"What a Great Night Restrung"	Matthew Lambert, Daniel Smith and Barry Francis	3:08
9.	"Obese Lowlifes Restrung" (featuring Mystro and Braintax)		2:25
10.	"City of Light Restrung"	Matthew Lambert, Daniel Smith and Barry Francis	3:22
11.	"Clown Prince Restrung" (contains a sample of "Laying Pipe" by Pornosconic)	Matthew Lambert, Daniel Smith and Barry Francis	3:52
12.	"The Captured Vibe Restrung" (featuring DJ Reflux (Medley))	Matthew Lambert, Daniel Smith, Barry Francis and Daniel Yates	2:08
13.	"Recapturing the Vibe Restrung" (Medley)	Matthew Lambert, Daniel Smith and Barry Francis	3:15
14.	"Roll on Up"	Matthew Lambert, Daniel Smith and Barry Francis	3:49

== Charts ==
=== Weekly charts ===
Chart (2007)	Peak position
Australian Albums (ARIA)	8

== Certifications ==
Region	Certification	Certified units/sales
Australia (ARIA)	Gold	35,000^{^}
^{^} Shipments figures based on certification alone.
