= Cosby Sweater =

Single by Hilltop Hoods

from the album Walking Under Stars
- B-side: "Won't Let You Down"
- Released: 26 October 2014
- Genre: Hip hop
- Length: 3:37
- Label: Universal Music Australia
- Songwriters: Demetrius Christopholus, Barry Francis, John Kelman, Matthew Lambert, Daniel Smith

Hilltop Hoods singles chronology
"Pyramid Building" (2014)	"Cosby Sweater" (2014)

"Cosby Sweater" is a song by Australian hip hop group, Hilltop Hoods. It was released as the third single from the group's seventh studio album, Walking Under Stars (2014). In Australia, "Cosby Sweater" peaked at No. 4 on the Australian ARIA Singles Chart, becoming Hilltop Hoods' highest-charting single to date and their third top ten hit overall. The song was rated number three in Triple J's Hottest 100 2014, and in 2025, the song placed 64 on the Triple J Hottest 100 of Australian Songs. The song's accompanying music video was released on 3 October 2014 via the Australian iTunes Store.

== Reference to popular culture ==
The track's distinctive riff heavily samples the Wimple Winch track "Save My Soul".

The "Cosby Sweater" is a reference to the colourful and unusual sweaters Bill Cosby used to wear on TV - in particular, such a sweater worn in a press photo by The Notorious B.I.G., AKA Biggie Smalls. In the title and art direction, the Hilltop Hoods confuse the Bill Cosby sweaters designed by Koos van den Akker and worn by Cosby on his show The Cosby Show with the similarly expressive Coogi sweater worn by The Notorious B.I.G.

Later, with the sexual assault allegations involving Cosby the group have since stated that they regret naming the song after him and commented:

“To be honest we regret name checking Bill Cosby. Like some of you we’ve only recently become aware of the allegations against him. If he’s guilty of those allegations he can go jump in a fkn lake. A deep icy lake.”.

The song also references actor Tom Cruise, television host Oprah Winfrey, singers Christina Aguilera and Pat Benatar, chess prodigy Bobby Fischer and the elevator fight between rapper Jay-Z and Beyoncé’s sister, Solange Knowles (“slap a rapper like Solange Knowles”).

== Track listing ==
No.	Title	Length
1.	"Cosby Sweater" (Trials remix)	3:37
2.	"Won't Let You Down" (featuring Maverick Sabre)	4:27

== Charts ==
Chart (2014)	Peak position
Australia (ARIA)	4
Australian Urban (ARIA)	1

=== Year-end charts ===
Chart (2014)	Position
Australia (ARIA)	47
Chart (2015)	Position
Australia (ARIA)	66
Australia Urban (ARIA)	13

=== Decade-end charts ===
Chart (2010–2019)	Position
Australia (ARIA)	100
Australian Artist Singles (ARIA)	13

== Certifications ==
Region	Certification	Certified units/sales
Australia (ARIA)	12× Platinum	840,000^{‡}
New Zealand (RMNZ)	Platinum	30,000^{‡}
^{‡} Sales+streaming figures based on certification alone.

== See also ==
- List of highest-certified singles in Australia
