= Adelaide Symphony Orchestra =

South Australian orchestra based in Adelaide

- Orchestra
- Former name: South Australian Symphony Orchestra
- Founded: 1936
- Principal conductor: Mark Wigglesworth
- Website: www.aso.com.au

The Adelaide Symphony Orchestra (ASO) is a South Australian orchestra based in Adelaide, established in 1936. The orchestra's primary performance venue is the Adelaide Town Hall, but the ASO also performs in other venues. It provides the orchestral support for all productions of the State Opera of South Australia and all Adelaide performances of the Australian Ballet. It also features regularly at the Adelaide Festival, and has performed at the Adelaide Cabaret Festival, WOMAdelaide and several other festivals in Adelaide.

== History ==
In 1936 the South Australian Orchestra was supplanted by the 50-member Adelaide Symphony Orchestra led by William Cade, and sponsored by the Australian Broadcasting Commission (later the Australian Broadcasting Corporation, or ABC). The orchestra reformed in 1949 as the 55-member South Australian Symphony Orchestra, with Henry Krips as its resident conductor. The orchestra reverted to its original title, the Adelaide Symphony Orchestra, in late 1975.

The ASO's highlights have included its 1998 performances of Richard Wagner's Ring Cycle, the first Australian production since 1913 (although it was widely and erroneously claimed to be the first ever in Australia).

The orchestra participated in the first fully Australian production of The Ring in 2004.

In 2007, the orchestra partnered with Hilltop Hoods to prepare a re-orchestrated release of their album The Hard Road, titled The Hard Road: Restrung.

In 2009 Premier and Arts Minister Mike Rann proposed and provided government funding to the ASO to commission a major orchestral work about climate change. The ASO's world premiere of Gerard Brophy's The Blue Thread, inspired by the River Murray, was performed at the Concert for the Earth at the Adelaide Town Hall on 27 November 2010. The Rann government proposed and arranged funding for two further ASO commissions, the first an orchestral tribute to the cricketer Sir Donald Bradman, and the second commemorating the centenary of the ANZAC landings at Gallipoli. The world premiere of Our Don by Natalie Williams was performed by the ASO in August 2014.

The world premiere of an ANZAC Requiem by composer Iain Grandage and librettist Kate Mulvany was performed on 22 April 2015.

In 2015 the Hilltop Hoods collaborated for a second time with the 32-piece Adelaide Symphony Orchestra and the 20-piece Adelaide Chamber Singers Choir for their next re-orchestrated album titled Drinking from the Sun, Walking Under Stars Restrung.

In 2016, the Adelaide Symphony Orchestra formed its first artistic leadership team, comprising principal conductor, Nicholas Carter, its new artist-in-association, violinist Pinchas Zukerman, and principal guest conductor and artistic advisor Sir Jeffrey Tate. Carter was the youngest principal conductor in the orchestra's history, and the first Australian conductor to be appointed to a principal conductor position with a major Australian orchestra in almost 30 years. Carter completed his term as principal conductor in 2019.

In 2017, the orchestra was central in the Adelaide Festival's staging of Barrie Kosky's Saul – a production from Glyndebourne Opera in the UK, and again in 2018 for the Adelaide Festival's Glyndebourne Opera production and Australian premiere of composer Brett Dean's new opera, Hamlet. These performances were received with critical acclaim and numerous Helpmann Awards.

In 2018, the artistic leadership team evolved to include the orchestra's new emerging artist-in-association, Grace Clifford; Australian composer and the orchestra's then-new composer-in-association, Cathy Milliken; and the orchestra's then-new principal guest conductor, Mark Wigglesworth. As of 2025, the artistic leadership team consists of Concertmaster Kate Suthers, Emerging Composer in Association Jakub Jankowski, Conductor Laureate Nicholas Braithwaite, and chief conductor Mark Wigglesworth, and the orchestra consists of 75 musicians.

In May 2024, the orchestra announced the appointment of Mark Wigglesworth as its next chief conductor, effective January 2025, with an initial term of three years.

== Venues and ongoing work ==
The orchestra's primary performance venue is the Adelaide Town Hall, but the ASO also performs in other venues such as the Adelaide Festival Centre, Adelaide Entertainment Centre, Elder Hall at the University of Adelaide and its own Grainger Studio (named after composer Percy Grainger).

The ASO provides the orchestral support for all productions of the State Opera of South Australia, as well as the Adelaide performances of The Australian Ballet. The orchestra is a regularly featured ensemble at the Adelaide Festival, and also appears as part of the Adelaide Cabaret Festival, OzAsia Festival, Adelaide Guitar Festival and WOMADelaide.

== Recognition, awards and international tours ==
- 1996 – Tour to China (Beijing, Jinan, Qingdao and Shanghai), Korea (Seoul, Daegu) and Singapore
- 1998 – State Opera of South Australia's production of Wagner's Ring Cycle; repeated in 2004 with the first all-Australian production
- 2004 – Helpmann Award Finalist for Best Classical Concert Presentation – Requiem & The Grainger Special 2003
- 2004 – Helpmann Award for Best Opera – Dead Man Walking, State Opera SA 2003
- 2005 – Helpmann Award Winner for Best Opera – The Ring Cycle, State Opera SA 2004
- 2006 – 2013 Mahler Symphony Cycle
- 2007 – recorded The Hard Road Restrung with hip hop band the Hilltop Hoods – went gold (sold over 35,000 units); awarded 2007 ARIA Award for Best Urban Release
- 2008 – Helpmann Awards Finalist for Best Classical Concert Presentation – Sibelius Festival
- 2009 – Tour to Carnegie Hall, New York as part of the G'Day USA celebrations
- 2010 – Sibelius Symphony Cycle
- 2012 – Helpmann Award Finalist for Best Symphony Concert – Master Series 3 – Fire Series
- 2013 – APRA/Australian Music Centre's Arts Award for Excellence in Music Education – Australian Emerging Composers Creative Workshop with Tan Dun and six young Australian composers
- 2016 – Arts South Australia Ruby Award for Sustained Contribution by an Organisation
- 2017 – Helpmann Award for Best Opera – Saul, Adelaide Festival 2016
- 2017 – The Bush Concert (ASO commissioned work) toured to Harbin for the 34th China Harbin Summer Music Festival
- 2019 – winner of Best Independent Classical Album in the AIR Independent Music Awards for Bach Concertos, along with the Grigoryan Brothers and Benjamin Northey.

=== ARIA Music Awards ===
Year	Nominated works	Award	Result
1995	Dream Children, with Ron Spigelman (Note: Nominated as Dream Child)	Best Children's Album	Nominated
1995	Powerhouse Three Poems of Byron – Capriccio Nocturnes Unchained Melody, with David Porcelijn and János Fürst	Best Classical Album	Nominated
1997	Peter Sculthorpe: Sun Music, with David Porcelijn	Best Classical Album	Won
2002	Górecki: Symphony No. 3, with Yvonne Kenny	Best Classical Album	Nominated
2007	Sculthorpe Requiem and Orchestral Works, with Arvo Volmer	Best Classical Album	Nominated
2018	Home, with Greta Bradman, Adelaide Chamber Singers, Luke Dollman	Best Classical Album	Nominated
2019	Bach Concertos, with Grigoryan Brothers, Benjamin Northey	Best Classical Album	Nominated
2020	Beethoven Piano Concertos, with Jayson Gillham, Nicholas Carter	Best Classical Album	Nominated

== Principal conductors ==
- William Cade (resident conductor, 1939)
- Bernard Heinze (guest conductor, 1939)
- Percy Code (interim resident conductor, 1949)
- Henry Krips (resident conductor, 1949–1972)
- Elyakum Shapirra (chief conductor, 1975–1979)
- José Serebrier (principal guest conductor, 1982–1983)
- Piero Gamba (chief conductor, 1983–1985)
- Albert Rosen (chief conductor, 1986)
- Nicholas Braithwaite (chief conductor, 1987–1991)
- David Porcelijn (chief conductor, 1993–1998)
- Arvo Volmer (chief conductor, 2004–2013)
- Nicholas Carter (chief conductor, 2015–2019)
- Mark Wigglesworth (chief conductor, 2025–present)

== See also ==
- Symphony Services International
