= 1955 (song) =

Single by Hilltop Hoods featuring Montaigne and Tom Thum

from the album Drinking from the Sun, Walking Under Stars Restrung
- Released: 8 February 2016
- Genre: Hip hop
- Length: 3:59
- Label: Universal Australia
- Songwriters: Matthew David Lambert, Daniel Howe Smith, Barry John M. Francis and Andrew Albert Burford

Hilltop Hoods featuring Montaigne and Tom Thum singles chronology
"Higher" (2015)	"1955" (2016)	"Clark Griswold" (2018)

Montaigne singles chronology
"In the Dark" (2016)	"1955" (2016)	"Because I Love You" (2016)

"1955" is a song by Australian hip hop group Hilltop Hoods, featuring Montaigne and Tom Thum. It was released as the second single from the group's second remix album, Drinking from the Sun, Walking Under Stars Restrung (2016). In Australia, "1955" peaked at No. 2 on the Australian ARIA Singles Chart, becoming Hilltop Hoods' highest charting single to date. The song was rated number four in Triple J's Hottest 100 in 2016. The song's accompanying music video was released on 7 February 2016 via their Facebook page.

To celebrate the release of the album, "1955" along with the other tracks on Drinking from the Sun, Walking Under Stars Restrung were performed in the Restrung Tour. This tour went to Australia's five capital cities and featured Australia's best symphony orchestras and choirs along with special guest Maverick Sabre and Montaigne.

== Background ==
Inspiration for the song came when Matthew Lambert (Suffa) and his wife went to see comedian Dylan Moran. Moran opened the show by stating that he'd always wanted to come to Adelaide to see what it would've been like in 1955. Lambert later commented on Moran's performance:

"That cracked me up. I love Adelaide – I’ve lived there my whole life, but yeah it is sort of like that and when you’re from a small town it is almost like you’re stuck in a different era of time – which is just fine with me while there’s bombs over Damascus. I’m grateful to live somewhere beautiful and safe."

Hilltop Hoods collaborated with Australian singer Montaigne and beatboxer Tom Thum for the song.

In an interview with Triple J, Suffa commented on what the song was about:

"[it's] about living in a small town, a place where things don’t change too much… sometimes living in a small town is like living in a different era. I actually love small-town life; obviously it has its drawbacks, but I really enjoy the simplicity and being part of a community."

== Composition ==
"1955" is a hip hop song which is written in the key E major and has a tempo of 84 beats per minute. The track goes for 3 minutes and 59 seconds.

== Reference to popular culture ==
Tom Thum's opening line in the track makes reference to "sniffing salts", a chemical compound that was used in the early 20th century that could be used to wake someone up from an unconscious state. The lyrics are relayed to imitate an old radio advertisement:

"If you're feeling low, then give it a go! Try Lambert's Sniffing Salts today"

The group also criticise the amount of racial profiling that occurs in society, by making reference to the "Clutch of Fear": the act of clutching a purse in fear due to the racial profiling of a nearby individual.

Suffa is quick to dismiss the advice of people who watch news channels like Fox, stating how they are unreliable and biased:

"They prophecise on the bench by the main road, right

They got advice; I’m like 'Ayo, if you say so guys'

But what do they know, Fox News got 'em lit"

The group makes reference to 'Plan C'. A plan devised by the FBI during the Cold War which enforced martial law if a nuclear attack was to occur. Hence "it gets so quiet at night", since the military was able to enforce new laws such as curfews during this period.

"It's like we ride through life

Right in the shadow of the cold war

It gets so quiet at night

Like martial law took a hold y'all, '55"

There is also a reference to "the War of the Worlds" episode in the anthology series "The Mercury Theater on the Air". This radio broadcast features an alien invasion story, which causes mass panic amongst civilians as they are not aware that the broadcast is a work of fiction. This reference is made in Tom Thum's lyrics:

"And across the country, they came in waves. Thousands upon thousands of flying discs descending from the planet Mars."

== Music video ==
The music video was initially released on 7 February 2016 and was produced by Anna Bardsley-Jones and directed by Richard Coburn. It features a cameo from rapper Briggs as "Grill Murray" and is set in a 1950s diner (really the Cafeteria Car at the National Railway Museum, Port Adelaide). The video depicts a wholesome environment where everything seems perfect and peaceful and all the people are happy and polite. However, the viewers of the video observe the diner through the eyes of a young girl (Montaigne) and how, beneath the surface, everything is not what it seems to be. This is shown through the various emotional outbursts that occur throughout the video by the patrons of the diner. The music video was nominated for Best Video at the ARIA Music Awards of 2016.

== Chart performance ==
In Australia, "1955" debuted at number 25 on the Australia ARIA Singles Chart in the week beginning 21 February 2016. It peaked at number 2 four weeks later in the week beginning 13 March 2016. The track managed to stay on the charts for a total of 28 weeks. In 2025, the song placed 73 on the Triple J Hottest 100 of Australian Songs.

== Charts ==
Chart (2016)	Peak position
Australia (ARIA)	2
New Zealand Heatseeker (RMNZ)	8

== Certifications ==
Region	Certification	Certified units/sales
Australia (ARIA)	14× Platinum	980,000^{‡}
New Zealand (RMNZ)	2× Platinum	60,000^{‡}
^{‡} Sales+streaming figures based on certification alone.

== See also ==
- List of highest-certified singles in Australia
