= Coogi =

Australian fashion brand

- Type: Private
- Industry: Consumer Goods
- Founded: 1969 in Toorak, Victoria, Australia
- Founder: Jacky Taranto
- Headquarters: New York, NY
- Key people: Norman Weisfeld, Bruce Weisfeld, Jimmy Khezri
- Products: Luxury goods
- Website: http://www.coogi.com

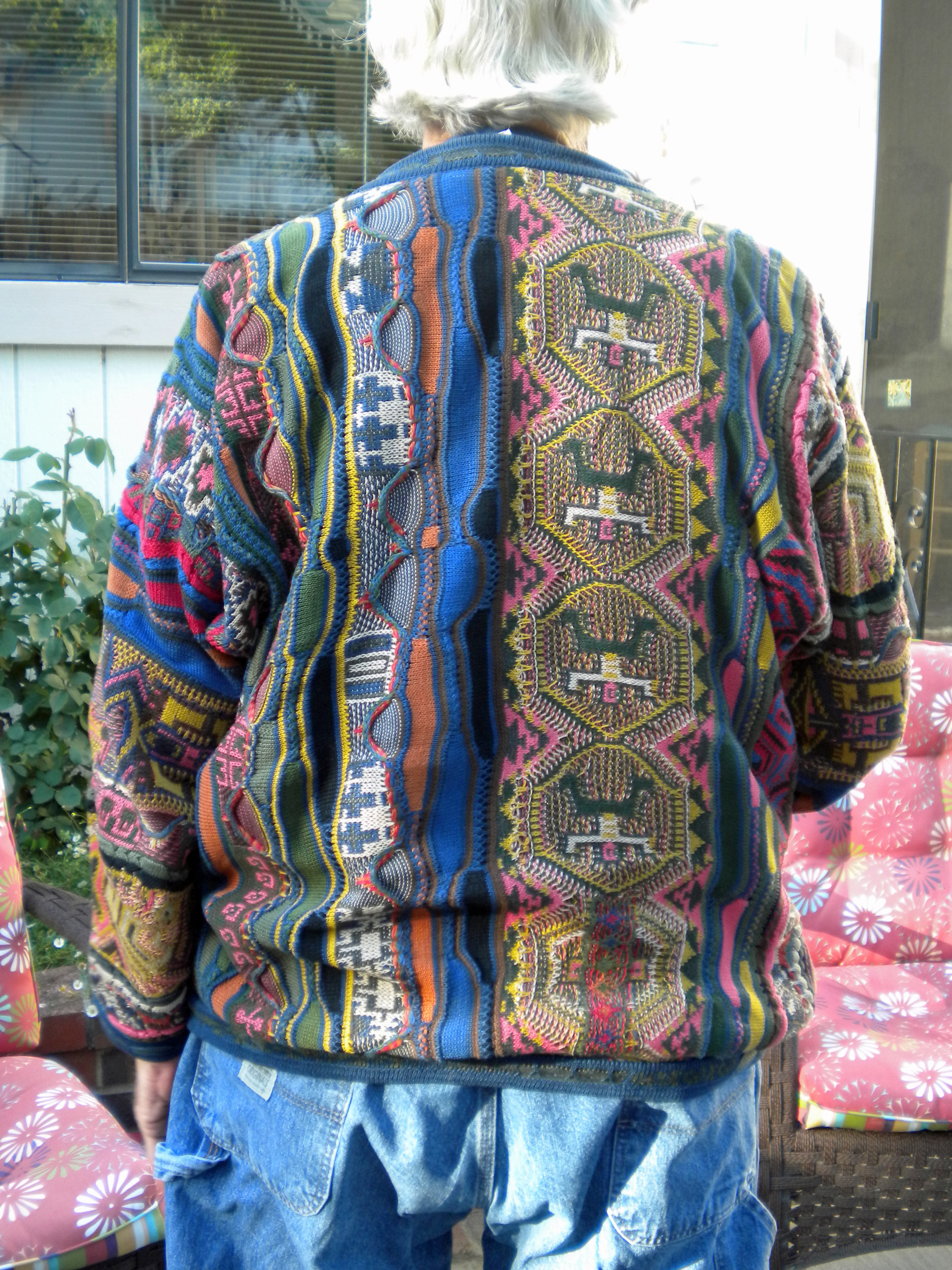
The back of a Coogi cardigan

Coogi is an Australian fashion brand known for colorful knitwear. Founded in 1969 as "Cuggi" in Toorak, Australia, the label was renamed in 1987. In addition to clothing, the company's 1992 international trademark filing registered the brand for cosmetics and toiletries, leather goods, furniture, textiles, and toys.

== History ==
Founded in 1969 as "Cuggi" in Toorak, Melbourne, Australia, the label was renamed in 1987 to sound more like an indigenous Australian name. The label was purchased in 2002 by Coogi Partners LLC, a joint venture in New York City; the brand subsequently grew from its core sweater line to a full apparel line, featuring patterns and designs reflective of the signature sweaters. The line expanded to women and children, including T-shirts, jeans, dress shirts, dresses, sweatshirts and matching sweat pants, footwear, handbags, outerwear, bathing suits, and underwear.

== Relaunch ==
Coogi relaunched in 2014 with a focus on the authentic sweater for men, introducing new products and color treatments. According to The New York Times, the label is experiencing a resurgence. Fashion brands such as Rag & Bone, Pigalle, Burton and Supreme have been paying homage to Coogi.

== In popular culture ==
The brand is first mentioned by The Notorious B.I.G. in the song "Big Poppa" and subsequently "One More Chance / Stay With Me (Remix)". "Heart throb never, black and ugly as ever, however, I stay Coogi down to the socks, rings and watch filled with rocks". The rapper also mentions the brand in the 1997 song "Hypnotize" in which he raps: "Every cutie with a booty bought a Coogi,” kicking off a new trend and causing clothing articles to fly off the shelves with consumers rushing to make a purchase.

The brand is then mentioned in the lyrics of the 2005 Kanye West song "Gone," in which he raps: "You sweat her and I ain't talkin 'bout a Coogi," as well as in his 2010 song "Devil in a New Dress," where Rick Ross raps: "Still a real nigga, red Coogi sweater, dice-roller." Ross mentions the brand again on his "Santorini Greece" song:"Fresher than Groovey Lew at a Coogi shoot".Kanye West also goes on to mention the brand in his lyrics of the 2017 song "Feel Me" with G.O.O.D Music counterpart Tyga: "Coogi, Coogi, Coogi, Coogi on, feels like I'm in the movie holmes, texted my consigliere, tell the maid leave the jacuzzi on."

The brand is mentioned in the lyrics of the Hilltop Hoods song "Cosby Sweater," in which MC Suffa raps: "When I'm dressed like Theo's Dad, In a Coogi listening to Kool G Rap." The song makes reference to the aforementioned Notorious B.I.G., who was famously photographed wearing a Coogi sweater. The Australian musician explained in an August 2014 interview that he owns a collection of Coogi sweaters.

The brand is mentioned in the lyrics of the 2013 ASAP Ferg song "Work (Remix)" in which he raps: "Coogi down to the socks, like I'm Biggie Poppa", in reference to The Notorious B.I.G. being known for wearing Coogi.

In 2014, Christian hip-hop duo Social Club released the song "Coogi Sweater" in their album Misfits 2.

The brand is mistakenly called the "Cosby sweater" though Bill Cosby never wore Coogi sweaters. The Cosby Show costume designer, Sarah Lemire, said of Coogi: "My sweaters were busy to a certain point, but it wasn't to that extreme… I still can't stand those."

The brand was mentioned in season 2, episode 3 of Australian comedy series Kath and Kim titled "The Moon", where Kath and Kel purchase matching Coogis at Tullamarine Airport after their flights are grounded while travelling for their honeymoon.

In the TV series Malcolm in the Middle episode "No Motorbike" (Season 6, Episode 16), in the beginning when Hal swore to Francis that on his 21st birthday he would take him for a ride on a motorbike, Bryan Cranston was also seen wearing a Coogi sweater.

The brand is mentioned in the song "Still Fly" by the group Big Tymers in which Birdman raps "Burberry's cool, Coogi sweater (Sweater) Twenty inches, pop my feather The Birdman daddy, I fly in any weather."
