= The Great Expanse =

Studio album by Hilltop Hoods
- Released: 22 February 2019
- Genre: Australian hip hop
- Length: 42:54
- Label: Universal
- Producers: Matthew Lambert; Barry Francis; MC Pressure

Hilltop Hoods chronology
Drinking from the Sun, Walking Under Stars Restrung (2016)	The Great Expanse (2019)	Fall from the Light (2025)

Singles from The Great Expanse
- 1. "Clark Griswold" Released: 13 July 2018; 2. "Leave Me Lonely" Released: 23 November 2018; 3. "Exit Sign" Released: 22 February 2019

The Great Expanse is the eighth studio album by Australian hip hop trio Hilltop Hoods, released on 22 February 2019 through Universal Music Australia. The album was produced by members Suffa (Matthew Lambert) and DJ Debris (Barry Francis), and features gold-selling ARIA Award winning single "Clark Griswold" featuring Adrian Eagle, platinum single "Leave Me Lonely", and new single "Exit Sign" featuring Illy and Ecca Vandal.

The Great Expanse debuted at No. 1 on the ARIA Albums Chart, making it the group's sixth number one and setting a new ARIA record for most number-one albums by an Australian group. The album was also issued on CD and vinyl.

At the ARIA Music Awards of 2019, the album was nominated for three awards. Album of the Year, Best Group and Best Hip Hop Release.

== Composition ==
Second single "Leave Me Lonely" is about the "eternal struggle of being cornered by a close-talker". MC Pressure told The Music that while "Leave Me Lonely" is the "fastest song on the record", "there are a few other party banger style songs that it fits in nicely with. The album as a whole, however, varies from dark and moody to fun and upbeat throughout."

== Track listing ==
Track listing adapted from iTunes.

No.	Title	Length
1.	"The Great Expanse"	0:38
2.	"Into the Abyss"	3:45
3.	"Leave Me Lonely"	3:14
4.	"Be Yourself" (featuring Ecca Vandal and Nyassa)	3:06
5.	"Sell It All, Run Away" (featuring Timberwolf)	3:37
6.	"Exit Sign" (featuring Illy and Ecca Vandal)	3:43
7.	"Clark Griswold" (featuring Adrian Eagle)	3:48
8.	"OOFT (Ponda Baba)"	3:02
9.	"Counterweight"	3:58
10.	"Fire & Grace" (featuring Ruel)	3:49
11.	"What Becomes of Us"	3:24
12.	"Here Without You" (featuring Nyassa)	3:08
13.	"H Is For..."	3:42
Total length:		42:54

== Personnel ==
Hilltop Hoods

- Suffa (Matthew David Lambert) – vocals, engineering, mixing, producing
- Pressure (Daniel Howe Smith) – vocals
- DJ Debris (Barry John M Francis) – producing, engineering, turntablism

Additional musicians

- Ecca Vandal – guest vocals on track 4 and 6
- Nyassa – guest vocals on track 4 and 12
- Timberwolf – guest vocals on track 5
- Illy – guest vocals on track 6
- Adrian Eagle – guest vocals on track 7
- Ruel – guest vocals on track 10

== Charts ==
=== Weekly charts ===
Chart (2019)	Peak position
Australian Albums (ARIA)	1
Swiss Albums (Schweizer Hitparade)	18
UK Album Downloads (Official Charts)	55
UK R&B Albums (Official Charts)	18

=== Year-end charts ===
Chart (2019)	Position
Australian Albums (ARIA)	13

== Certifications ==
Region	Certification	Certified units/sales
Australia (ARIA)	Platinum	70,000^{‡}
^{‡} Sales+streaming figures based on certification alone.
