= Adrian Eagle =

Australian singer-songwriter

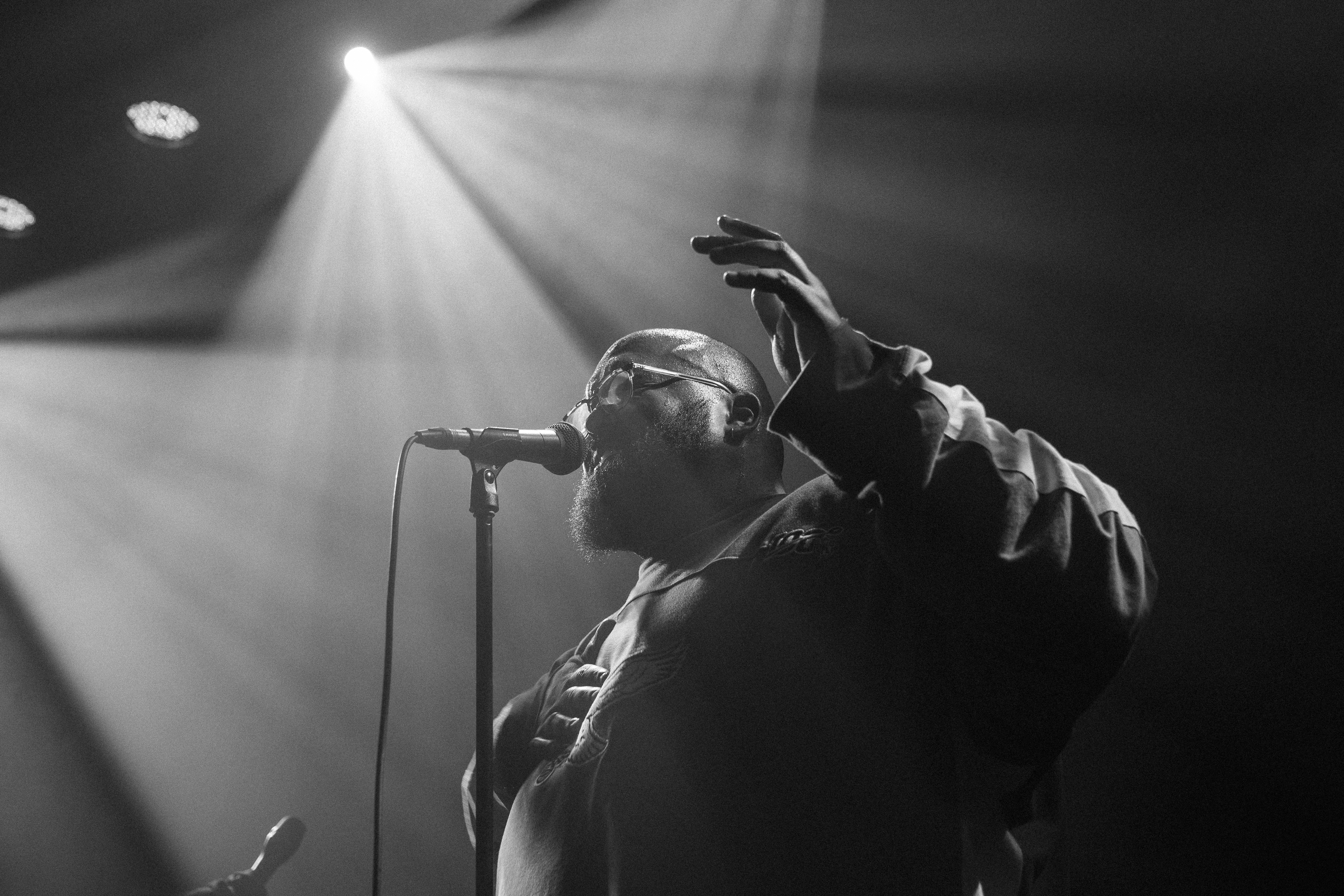

Background information
- Born: Adrian Naidu; 1992 (age 33–34); Adelaide
- Genres: Hip-hop, soul
- Occupation: Musician
- Instrument: Vocals
- Years active: 2016 - Present
- Website: https://www.adrianeagle.com

Adrian Eagle, born Adrian Naidu, is an Australian singer-songwriter. He is an ARIA Award winner and also a winner of two categories in the SA Music Awards in 2019.

== Early life ==
He was born in Adelaide to a Maltese mother and a Fiji-Indian father, with the surname Naidu. He has spoken frankly of his problems with anxiety, and his debut EP, Mama, pays homage to the women who have supported him, especially his mum, who raised him as a single mother.

== Career ==
His first break came when his cover of "Redemption Song" was shared by rapper 360. He later collaborated with the Hilltop Hoods on their single "Clark Griswold". That song won them the 2018 ARIA for Best Urban Release.

He went on to release the singles "17 Again" and "A.O.K." (which both had national rotation on Triple J,) and his debut EP, Mama, in 2019. Adrian also covered Ocean Alley's Hottest 100 winning single "Confidence" for Triple J's Like A Version, which drew praise from Rihanna.

Adrian Eagle also appears as a guest vocalist on a range of hip hop artists' recordings, including Thundamentals, Fortay, K21 and Yorta Yorta artist DRMNGNOW.

== Discography ==
=== Extended plays ===
Title	Details
Mama	Released: 20 September 2019; Formats: Digital download, streaming; Label: Universal Australia

=== Singles ===
==== As lead artist ====
Title	Year	Album
"Savior"	2016	Non-album single
"17 Again"	2018	Mama
"A.O.K"	2019	Mama
"Housing Trust"	2019	Mama
"Confidence" (Triple J Like a Version)	2019	Like a Version: Volume Fifteen

==== As featured artist ====
Title	Year	Album
"Live for the Day" Fortay featuring Adrian Eagle)	2016	West Syd Story
"One Shot" (K21 featuring Adrian Eagle)	2017	Any Given D-Day
"True Love" (Thundamentals featuring Adrian Eagle)	2018	I Love Songs
"Clark Griswold" (Hilltop Hoods featuring Adrian Eagle)	2018	The Great Expanse
"Australia Does Not Exist" (DRMNGNOW featuring Adrian Eagle, Philly & Culture Evolves)	2019	The Nature, Vol. 1
"Rain" (JK-47 and Jay Orient featuring Adrian Eagle)	2023	TBA

== Awards ==
=== ARIA Music Awards ===
The ARIA Music Awards is an annual awards ceremony that recognises excellence, innovation, and achievement across all genres of the music of Australia.

Year	Nominee / work	Award	Result
2018	"Clark Griswold" (with Hilltop Hoods)	Best Urban Album	Won
2019	"A.O.K."	Best Soul/R&B Release	Nominated

=== South Australian Music Awards ===
The South Australian Music Awards (previously known as the Fowler's Live Music Awards) are annual awards that exist to recognise, promote and celebrate excellence in the South Australian contemporary music industry. They commenced in 2012.

Year	Nominee / work	Award	Result (wins only)
2018	Adrian Eagle	Best New Artist	Won
2019	Adrian Eagle	Best Solo Artist	Won
2019	"A-OK" by Adrian Eagle	Best Release	Won
