= Left Foot, Right Foot =

Studio album by Hilltop Hoods
- Released: 20 August 2001
- Recorded: Early 2000–2001
- Studio: X-Bred Production Studio
- Genre: Hip hop
- Length: 58:19
- Label: Independent release
- Producers: Matthew Lambert; B. Francis; M. Veraguth

Hilltop Hoods chronology
A Matter of Time (1999)	Left Foot, Right Foot (2001)	The Calling (2003)

Left Foot, Right Foot is the second album by Australian hip hop group Hilltop Hoods. It was released on 20 August 2001. To promote the album the group performed six or seven shows over a few months. The album is Hilltop Hoods' second studio album, and was released without a label.

"Twilight", a track that was strictly performed live at the end of Hilltop Hoods' shows was originally going to be featured on this album, but was not finished in time to be fully released.

"Actually, he did produce one track but it wasn't finished in time, though it'll be on the vinyl. But when he does produce beats, they're incredible!" — Matthew Lambert (Suffa)

== Track listing ==
All tracks are written by Daniel Smith, Matthew Lambert, Barry Francis unless otherwise shown

Left Foot, Right Foot track listing
No.	Title	Writer(s)	Notes	Length
0.	"Afternoon Group Session"		A hidden track found by fast-rewinding the CD from track 1	3:52
1.	"Are You Ready?"	Produced by M. Lambert, Scratches by DJ Debris		1:32
2.	"The Soul of the Beat"	Produced by M. Lambert, Written and performed by M. Lambert & D. Smith, Scratches by DJ Debris, Guitar by Nick Lambert		4:07
3.	"Left Foot, Right Foot"	Produced by M. Lambert, Written and performed by M. Lambert & D. Smith, Additional vocals by Jodie Morgan, Beatbox by Simplex	featuring Raizeone	3:39
4.	"Immortal MCs"			2:51
5.	"What the Seasons Change"			4:18
6.	"Another World"	Lambert, Smith, Francis, Hau Langomi-E-Latukefu	featuring Koolism	3:21
7.	"When I'm"			4:04
8.	"Leaving Sideways"			2:44
9.	"Running from the Storm"			3:56
10.	"Distortion"			3:04
11.	"Don't Stop" (M. Lambert, D. Smith, B. Francis, M. Veraguth)			3:24
12.	"Elevation (RMX)"		remix featuring DJ Bonez	3:03
13.	"Baby Steps"			1:01
14.	"Sojourn" (Lambert, Smith, Francis, Morgan)			3:52
15.	"Tolerance Levels"	Daniel Smith	featuring Mass MC and Fatface	5:24
16.	"Immortal MC's (RMX)" (Lambert, Smith, Francis, Veraguth, Gianni Valente)			2:58
17.	"I Believe" (Lambert, Smith, Francis, Daniel Yates)		featuring DJ Reflux	3:39
18.	"Omega"			1:19
19.	"The Soul of the Beat (RMX)"		This track is in a MP3 format and obtainable by placing the disc in a computer's CD-ROM drive	3:40
20.	"Elevation (88' Remix)" (Lambert, Smith, Francis, Veraguth)		This track is in a MP3 format and obtainable by placing the disc in a computer's CD-ROM drive	2:47
Total length:				58:19

== Personnel ==
- Daniel Smith — vocals
- Matthew Lambert — vocals
- Nick Lambert — guitar (track 2)
- Jodie Morgan — vocals (tracks 3, 14)
- Chris Lambert — double bass (track 5), percussion (track 9)
- Hau Latukefu — vocals (track 6)
- Danielsan Ichiban — scratches (track 6)
- Adam Markey — bass guitar (track 11)
- G. Kordas — scratches (track 12)
- Barry Francis — vocals (track 15), scratches (track 20)
- Gianni Valente — vocals (track 15)
- M. Veraguth — vocals (track 15)
- Daniel Yates — scratches (track 17)

== Credits ==
- Mastered: Neville Clarke
- Producer: Matthew Lambert (tracks 1–10, 12–14, 16–20); Barry Francis & M. Veraguth (track 11 & 15)
- Artwork: J. Englehardt
