= Casper's =

Hot dog restaurant chain based in the East Bay, California, U.S.

Caspers Famous Hot Dogs
- Company type: Private
- Industry: Restaurants
- Genre: Fast food
- Founded: 1934; 92 years ago in Oakland, California
- Founder: Steve and Ardam Beklian; Paul and Rose Agajan
- Headquarters: Lafayette, California
- Number of locations: 5 (2026)
- Area served: Eastern region of the San Francisco Bay Area
- Key people: Steve and Ardam Beklian; Paul and Rose Agajan; Kasper Koojoolian
- Owner: Ron Dorian; Paul Rustigian
- Website: caspershotdogs.com

Caspers Famous Hot Dogs is a San Francisco Bay Area-based chain of hot dog restaurants established in 1934. Caspers’ hot dogs are reminiscent of Chicago-style hot dogs, in that they are dressed with sliced onions, sliced tomatoes, mustard, and relish. This reflects the founders’ experience selling hot dogs in Chicago.

Caspers operates 5 locations in the East Bay: Dublin, Hayward, Oakland, Pleasant Hill, and Richmond.

== History ==
The origin of Caspers Hot Dogs can be traced back Kasper Koojoolian, who first started selling hot dogs in Chicago in the 1920s after fleeing the Armenian genocide. He then moved to Oakland because of its warmer climate and in 1930 opened a hot dog restaurant called Kasper’s Hot Dogs. The success of his restaurant drew his friends and family from Chicago, including his brother Paul Koojoolian, and his cousins Steve Beklian and Paul Agajan. Together, they opened more locations of Kasper’s. Beklian and Agajan opened their first location of Kasper’s in 1934.

As the chain expanded, different family members had different ideas on how to expand. Beklian and Agajan split off in 1939 and named their restaurants Caspers Hot Dogs. Meanwhile, Kasper’s Hot Dogs continued to operate until its last location closed in 2025. Separately, Kasper Koojoolian’s son-in-law Harry Yaglijian gained ownership of a Kasper’s location in the Temescal neighborhood of Oakland, which was dubbed Original Kasper’s Hot Dogs and operated until 2003. The separation has been characterized as both hostile and amicable.

When Beklian and Agajan eventually passed away, their wives Ardam and Rose took over, and other family members eventually got involved in the business. The current owners, Ron Dorian and Paul Rustigian, are the company’s third-generation family owners.

In 1989, the owners of Caspers Hot Dogs started its own sausage manufactory called SPAR Sausage Company, now in San Leandro, California. The name is derived from the first names of the founders of Caspers. Several years later, Kasper’s Hot Dogs also started producing its own sausages, prompting a lawsuit from Caspers in 1998. SPAR Sausage Company eventually produced sausages for Kasper’s Hot Dogs as well, albeit with a different recipe from Caspers.
