= Walking Under Stars =

Studio album by Hilltop Hoods
- Released: 8 August 2014
- Genre: Australian hip hop
- Length: 49:54
- Label: Golden Era
- Producer: Sixfour, One Above, Suffa, Cam Bluff, Debate

Hilltop Hoods chronology
Drinking from the Sun (2012)	Walking Under Stars (2014)	Drinking from the Sun, Walking Under Stars Restrung (2016)

Singles from Walking Under Stars
- 1. "Won't Let You Down" Released: 27 June 2014; 2. "Pyramid Building" Released: 3 August 2014; 3. "Cosby Sweater" Released: 26 October 2014

Walking Under Stars is the seventh studio album by Australian hip hop group Hilltop Hoods, released on 8 August 2014.

At the J Awards of 2014, the album was nominated for Australian Album of the Year.

== Background ==
Prior to the release of the album, Hilltop Hoods referred to Walking Under Stars as a "companion piece" to previous album Drinking from the Sun, with both albums sharing similar themes, artwork and connected via a five-part narrative, entitled 'The Thirst', commencing with the opening track on Drinking from the Sun, "The Thirst Pt. 1" and concluding with "The Thirst Pt. 5" at the end of Walking Under Stars.

The first single, "Won't Let You Down", premiered on Triple J on 24 June 2014 and was officially released on 27 June. The album was released on 8 August 2014 and debuted at number one on the ARIA Charts, making it Hilltop Hood's fourth consecutive number one album. The album was certified gold (denoting over 35,000 sales) in Australia, shortly after release.

At the ARIA Music Awards of 2014, the album received three nominations and became the group's fifth consecutive release and fourth consecutive studio album to win Best Urban Album.

== Track listing ==
Walking Under Stars track listing
No.	Title	Length
1.	"The Thirst Pt. 4 (Interlude)" (featuring Aaradhna)	3:02
2.	"Walking Under Stars"	3:45
3.	"Cosby Sweater"	3:37
4.	"The Art of the Handshake"	3:39
5.	"Live and Let Go" (featuring Brother Ali and Maverick Sabre)	4:45
6.	"Pyramid Building"	3:23
7.	"Through the Dark"	4:37
8.	"Won't Let You Down" (featuring Maverick Sabre)	4:27
9.	"Rumble Young Man, Rumble" (featuring Dan Sultan)	4:04
10.	"Brainbox" (featuring Drapht)	4:21
11.	"I'm a Ghost"	4:23
12.	"The Thirst Pt. 5 (Interlude)" (featuring Aaradhna)	2:09

JB Hi-Fi bonus track
No.	Title	Length
13.	"The Art of the Handshake" (Plutonic Lab Remix)	3:42

iTunes bonus track
No.	Title	Length
13.	"The Art of the Handshake" (K21 Remix)	4:09

== Personnel ==
- Recorded and mixed by DJ Debris
- Mastered by Neville Clarke
- Artwork by J. Englehardt

== Charts and certifications ==
=== Weekly charts ===
Chart (2014)	Peak position
Australian Albums (ARIA)	1
New Zealand Albums (RMNZ)	23
Swiss Albums (Schweizer Hitparade)	19
UK R&B Albums (OCC)	32

=== Year-end charts ===
Chart (2014)	Position
Australian Albums (ARIA)	9
Chart (2015)	Position
Australian Albums (ARIA)	25

=== Decade-end charts ===
Chart (2010–2019)	Position
Australian Albums (ARIA)	61
Australian Artist Albums (ARIA)	9

=== Certifications ===
Region	Certification	Certified units/sales
Australia (ARIA) 10th Anniversary Edition	3× Platinum	210,000^{‡}
New Zealand (RMNZ)	Gold	7,500^{‡}
^{‡} Sales+streaming figures based on certification alone.
