= Blackwood High School =

Location
- Eden Hills, South Australia; Australia; 35.0259°S 138.6063°E

Information
- Type: Secondary school
- Motto: Inspiring Achievement and Respect
- Established: 1961
- School board: Blackwood High School Governing Council
- Principal: Chris Brandwood
- Years offered: 7–12
- Enrolment: 1200
- Classrooms: 75
- Houses: Ashby, Madigan, Mills, Russell
- Colours: Green, white and red
- Website: www.bhs.sa.edu.au

Blackwood High School is a co-educational secondary school located in Eden Hills, a south-eastern suburb of Adelaide, South Australia, teaching to the Australian Curriculum and the South Australian Certificate of Education (SACE). It is also a special-interest high school that specialises in netball and Australian rules Football.

The school developed a resource with Sturt Police on "Teenage Parties" that has been adapted by Victorian private schools Scotch College and Toorak College. The school also has a canteen (which services other local schools) and is the site of the Blackwood Community Recreation Centre.

In 2022, the school has adopted a rule which bans students from using their mobile phone during school hours. This has been met with criticism from both students and parents, claiming that the move makes it much more difficult for students to communicate with their parents. From July 2023, the Department for Education introduced a state-wide ban on mobile phones during school hours in all government secondary schools.

== Curriculum and learning ==
Blackwood High School previously offered the IB Middle Years Programme at Year 8–10 (until 2021). Following the introduction of Year 7 to High School in South Australia, the school's Governing Council voted to discontinue the IB program. From 2022, only the Australian Curriculum at Year 7–10, with the South Australian Certificate of Education (SACE) are offered at Year 11–12.

== Facilities ==
=== Performing Arts Centre (PAC) ===
The Performing Arts Centre (PAC), the Auditorium, or the Blackwood Community Recreation Centre, was constructed in 2001 with funds raised in several schools and community-based fund-raisers. It features several sound-proofed rooms, computing equipment, musical instruments, and a large theatre and stage, with a booth for controlling the lighting and sound effects. The PAC is also used by the community as a church on Sunday mornings.

The main auditorium seats about 350, with the capability to have an extended stage because of retractable seating. In addition to the main performing areas, the PAC boasts a recording studio, four practise rooms, three classrooms, an office, and a storeroom.

=== Recreation centre and gym ===
Constructed in 2004, the Blackwood Recreation Centre is co-located on the Blackwood High site, with facilities shared between the school and Community Recreation Centre. The school has a permanent arrangement to operate one of the two courts, and half of the changing/bathroom facilities. Additionally, the school also operates a staff office in the space. The facility is also used to host whole-school assemblies and events.

=== Canteen ===
In 2020/2021, the canteen and conference were demolished, replaced by new facilities. Students are able to walk into the canteen, select items, and pay upon exiting. The canteen also services other local schools.

== Student opportunities ==
Students have the opportunity to take part in several leadership opportunities, including:

- Prefects
- Middle School Leadership
- Peer Support
- Learning Cultures
- Student Wellbeing
- House Captains

== Notable alumni ==
- David James Campbell, writer and film director
- Chloë Fox, South Australia MP in the South Australian House of Assembly
- Rebecca Morse, newsreader for Channel 10, South Australia
- Peter Rathjen, medical researcher and Rhodes scholar
- Terence Tao, mathematician and 2006 recipient of the Fields Medal
- Musicians
  - Julian Cochran, composer
  - Beccy Cole, musician
  - Matt Lambert (Suffa) and Dan Smith (Pressure) of the Hilltop Hoods
  - Allday, rapper
  - Nathan Leigh Jones, musician
- Sports people:
  - Adam Cooney, 2008 Brownlow Medal winner, AFL, Western Bulldogs and Essendon
  - Peter Motley, Australian rules footballer – Sturt Football Club 1982–1985 and Carlton Football Club 1986–87
  - Matthew Nicks, Australian rules footballer – West Adelaide and Sydney Swans 1996–2005
  - Kerri Pottharst, Australian professional beach volleyball player and Olympic gold medalist
  - Bianca Reddy, netballer for the Adelaide Thunderbirds
  - Liam Reddy, soccer player in the National Soccer League (Parramatta Power, Sydney United), the A-League (Newcastle Jets, Brisbane Roar, Wellington Phoenix, Sydney, Central Coast Mariners, Western Sydney Wanderers, Perth Glory), and Persian Gulf Pro League (Esteghlal)
  - Joel Reddy, National Rugby League player – South Sydney Rabbitohs, Wests, and Parramatta
  - Ben Rutten, former Australian Rules footballer – Adelaide Football Club 2003–2014 All-Australian selection in 2005
  - Matthew Powell, former Australian Rules footballer – Adelaide Football Club 1993–1995

== School publications ==
- Each year, the school's year 11 students compile a yearbook, which has, since its beginnings, been entitled Cambium. Students contribute articles, photographs, artworks, and written works, which give a snapshot of the school year.
