= A Matter of Time (Hilltop Hoods album) =

Studio album by Hilltop Hoods
- Released: 1999
- Recorded: X bred Studios, South Australia
- Genre: Hip hop
- Length: 42:58
- Label: Independent release
- Producer: Barry Francis; Matthew Lambert; Daniel Smith; Chris Lambert

Hilltop Hoods chronology
| Back Once Again (1997) | A Matter of Time (1999) | Left Foot, Right Foot (2001) |

A Matter of Time is the debut album by Australian hip hop group Hilltop Hoods, released in 1999.

The promotion, manufacturing and marketing of the album was funded by a grant from the band's local government and resulted in the band once it became successful setting up its own grant scheme for South Australian hip hop musicians.

It was a publicity grant. We used it mainly to print up flyers and put ads in local street press for our album. To put out the album before that EP we actually had to take out a bank loan just to finance it. We were young and broke at the time and really had no other resources to get money. Luckily we had enough money left over from the sales of that to bring out our second album

— Mathew Lambert (Suffa)

The album is currently out of press, but is available as a free download from the Hilltop Hoods official site.

The quote used in the song, "A Matter of Time", is taken from the 1994 movie The Shawshank Redemption, where Morgan Freeman's character, Ellis Boyd "Red" Redding, says to Tim Robbins's character, Andrew "Andy" Dufresne, "That's all it takes, just pressure and time".

== Track listing ==
Songwriting credits from Australasian Performing Right Association (APRA).

1. "A Matter of Time" (D. Smith, M. Lambert) – 4:35
2. "1979" (M. Lambert) – 3:53
3. "The Anthem" (D. Smith, M. Lambert) – 4:13
4. "Time Wasted" – 0:39
5. "B-Boy Battlegear" (M. Lambert) – 3:01
6. "Give It Up" (D. Smith, M. Lambert) – 3:19
7. "Clap Your Hands to The..." – 1:10
8. "Let Me Show You" – 3:32
9. "Deaf Can Hear" (featuring Bukue One) (D. Smith, T. Torrance, M. Lambert) – 4:00
10. "Common Streets" (D. Smith) – 3:29
11. "A Matter of Time" (instrumental remix) – 2:18
12. "1979" (remix) (M. Lambert) – 3:31
13. "Whatcha Got?" (D. Smith, M. Lambert) – 4:03
14. "Whatcha Got?" (instrumental remix) – 1:19

== Personnel ==
- Daniel Smith (Pressure)
- Matthew Lambert (Suffa)
- Barry Francis (DJ Debris)
- Tion Torrance (Bukue One) — track 9

== Credits ==
- Producer:
  Barry Francis — tracks 1, 2, 3, 4, 5, 6, 8, 9, 10, 11
  Matthew Lambert — tracks 1, 2, 4, 5, 6, 9, 10, 11, 12
  Daniel Smith — track 11
  Chris Lambert — track 13
- Mastered: Neville Clarke
- Mixed: Barry Francis, Matthew Lambert
- Artwork: Chris Lambert, J. Englehardt
