= Suffa =

Australian musical artist

- Suffa in 2025

Background information
- Born: Matthew David Lambert; 6 May 1977 (age 49); Adelaide, South Australia, Australia
- Genre: Hip hop
- Occupations: Rapper, record producer
- Instrument: Vocals
- Years active: 1991–present
- Labels: Obese, Golden Era
- Member of: Hilltop Hoods

Matthew David Lambert (born 6 May 1977), known by his stage name Suffa or MC Suffa, is an Australian rapper and producer. He is best known as a founding member of the hip hop group Hilltop Hoods, and has been a recording artist since the 1999 release of the band's debut album, A Matter of Time. He has also produced tracks for other artists.

== Early life ==
Matt Lambert was born on 6 May in Adelaide, South Australia and grew up there. According to the Hilltop Hoods song "The Hard Road", he left high school without graduating and was subsequently employed as a factory labourer.

== Music career ==
Suffa met bandmate MC Pressure at Blackwood High School in the early 1990s and formed the Hilltop Hoods. After a demo and two releases, the band had a breakthrough album with The Calling in 2003.

Suffa's first solo production was a compilation album, entitled Suffering City Vol. 1, and was released in 2002—the album featured tracks such as "Divine Intervention Part 3", "True Aussie Icon" and "Lifes Geographics", whereby a series of artists performed over Suffa's musical creations. Artists such as Muphin, Pegasus, DJ Bonez and Reason contributed to Suffering City Vol. 1. In an interview prior to the launch of the album, Suffa provided a description of the album:

Because of the diverse range of artists I couldn’t say there was a particular flavour to the album. Perhaps the only continuity people will find on the album is the beats. As far as the content goes I’d have to say that it’s an album that Australian listeners can appreciate. You won’t find tracks on the album geared at trying to entice a US or European market.

In 2002, following his work on Suffering City Vol. 1, Suffa also revealed a perspective on hip hop production that he had discovered at that time of his career: "I think the key to hip hop production is keeping things rough. If a song’s too clean it loses its edge. My advice to producers is to look outside the standard jazz, funk and soul breaks for samples. I’ll sample anything, even if someone else has already used it. I’ve stopped caring about 'The rules'."

Following the release of the Hilltop Hoods' sixth album, Drinking from the Sun, a free EP, entitled The Good Life in the Sun, was released as a free download in mid-2012. The entire EP was produced by Suffa and featured remixes of songs from the sixth album, such as "Speaking in Tongues" and "The Underground". The EP also features a song that is a collaborative effort by Australian artists Plutonic Lab, One Above and Hilltop Hoods' DJ Debris.

In collaboration with Suffa, Western Australian MC Drapht released a song, entitled "Salute", on 20 February 2013, and it was uploaded to the MC's SoundCloud profile. Drapht also appears on the Hilltop Hoods' seventh studio album, Walking Under Stars, providing a verse for the track "Brainbox".

Hilltop Hoods released Walking Under Stars on 8 August 2014, and, while the album is a Golden Era Records recording, Universal Music Australia acquired the exclusive licensing rights to distribute the album in Australia, Canada, Austria, Germany, Switzerland, the United Kingdom, New Zealand, and the Benelux countries, while Golden Era continues its partnership with Fontana for the US release. Walking Under Stars was conceived before Drinking From the Sun was written, and Lambert referred to the former as "a companion piece" in an August 2014 interview. Lambert also explained that "I’m a Ghost" is four years old, while a segment of "Brainbox" originally appeared on the 2012 Golden Era mixtape.

After signing with Golden Era in early 2013, Adelaide MC K21 published the first single from his second album online in October 2014. Suffa was responsible for the production of the single, entitled "Change My Way" and features Joy Sparkes.

He has also produced tracks for other artists, such as Funkoars and Kate Miller-Heidke,

== Media appearances ==
In 2006, Suffa appeared on the ABC quiz show Spicks and Specks.

Suffa appeared with radio presenter Scott Dooley, a former host of the afternoon show of the national Australian youth radio station Triple J, in a 2009 video segment filmed in the Australian town of Sale, Victoria.

== Causes ==
In 2007, Suffa collaborated with People for the Ethical Treatment of Animals (PETA) to promote a campaign targeting the animal welfare practices of farms which supply chicken meat to the American fast food chain, Kentucky Fried Chicken. In a press release for the campaign, Suffa was clear about his position and perspective on the subject:

The chickens who end up in KFC buckets are crammed into windowless sheds with tens of thousands of other chickens and made to live in their own feces. They have the ends of their beaks sliced off without painkillers when they're still babies and are bred to grow so big, so fast, that their legs often snap under the weight of their bloated bodies. The sickest thing of all is that a lot of times chickens are still fully conscious when their throats are cut or when they're dunked into tanks of scalding hot water to remove their feathers. If KFC execs treated cats or dogs the way their suppliers treat chickens, they could be charged with crimes.

== Other activities ==
At the launch of the Australian Government's National Office for Live Music in July 2013, Lambert was announced as the state ambassador for South Australia. Arts Minister Tony Burke said the office would "partner with governments, local councils, communities, businesses, musicians and songwriters" and "identify key policy, regulatory and process reforms to better support a robust local live music scene." Lambert was reported as saying that a strong live music scene is essential given a decline in digital sales.

== Perspectives ==
In addition to the lyrical content of his MC work with the Hilltop Hoods, Suffa has also been considerably vocal in interviews in regard to his views on hip hop subjects, as well as broader issues. During the promotional period for Drinking From The Sun, Suffa conveyed his opinion on the growth of Australian indigenous hip hop, a particularly relevant issue for the artist due to his support of Trials (of the Funkoars) and Briggs, both Australian Aboriginal MCs who are on the Golden Era Records roster (the record label founded and owned by the Hilltop Hoods):

I don't want to take away from artists like Briggs and Trials and Brother Black by saying it's "Aboriginal hip hop"s time ... They've all got there on their artistic merits. You have to ask: "Is the audience ready for it?" I would say "definitely yes." I've seen the influence Briggs has on Aboriginal kids, and Trials; they're going to spur a whole generation of DJs and producers.

Also in 2012, Suffa commented on the place of competition in Australian hip hop:

I never like to see music as a competition, it's not a healthy way to be creatively, it's an unhealthy mindset. You should be making music for yourself; other influences shouldn't come into it. There are some subtle rivalries but nothing like the States, there’s no violence, no real beef. The kids here wouldn't know about real beef. And, I'm glad for that.

In an August 2014 promotional interview for Walking Under Stars, Lambert stated that the band's musical horizons had broadened over the course of their career and they "laugh now at how narrow-minded we were when we were kids":

When we were 18-year-old kids, there were only certain kinds of music, even hip hop, that we would listen to. The older you get, the more your horizons expand ... I think there’s a domino effect. You listen to one artist you like and then you keep digging from there.

Lambert concluded the interview by mentioning how grateful he is for his life situation: "When you wake up to Israel, Palestine, Syria, Iraq, Isis, Ukraine, all that shit—in the morning, it’s like "Jesus Christ!" I have a lovely house and I make music for a living ... Two fingers to everyone complaining about their first-world problems. We have it good, we have it lucky."

== Personal life ==
The Adelaide newspaper The Advertiser spoke with Lambert in April 2012, and he revealed that he had proposed to his partner Carlie:

I've been planning on proposing to my partner Carlie for a while now, but it was on our recent trip to the States that I finally picked up an engagement ring from Tiffany's in New York ... On the weekend I took her down the coast to where we first got together and proposed to her. We couldn't be happier.

In May 2012, whilst presenting an edition of the Australian hip hop show on Triple J (normally hosted by Hau Latukefu of Australian hip hop duo Koolism), Lambert confirmed that he was engaged.

Following the release of the "Cosby Sweater" single—from the seventh Hilltop Hoods studio album, Walking Under Stars—Lambert revealed that he owns a collection of Coogi sweaters, made famous by hip hop artists such as Biggie Smalls and Snoop Dogg. Lambert said that his wife does not approve of the aesthetic of the sweater, but he said that he explains to her: "You have no idea how comfortable I am right now."

In July 2016, Lambert welcomed the arrival of his first child, a daughter.
