= Marlon Motlop =

Australian musician, former footballer

Personal information
- Full name: Marlon Motlop
- Born: 17 April 1990 (age 36); Darwin, Australia
- Original team: Wanderers (NTFL)
- Draft: No. 28, 2007 National Draft
- Height: 179 cm (5 ft 10 in)
- Weight: 81 kg (179 lb)

Playing career^{1}
| Years | Club | Games (Goals) |
| 2008–2011 | Port Adelaide | 5 (2) |

Representative team honours
| Years | Team | Games (Goals) |
| 2009 | Indigenous All-Stars | 1 |
- ^{1} Playing statistics correct to the end of 2011.

Career highlights
- Swan Districts best and fairest 2012; Peel Thunder best and fairest 2013; North Adelaide Football Club best and fairest 2015; Glenelg SANFL premiership 2019

Marlon Motlop (born 17 April 1990), also professionally known as Marlon (stylised in all caps), is an Indigenous Australian former Australian rules footballer and musician.

Motlop played with the Port Adelaide Football Club from 2008 to 2011 in the Australian Football League (AFL), the country's highest level of professional football. Following his time in the AFL, Motlop played at various state league clubs in Western Australia and South Australia, highlighted by a premiership with the Glenelg Football Club in 2019.

Motlop has been developing a career as a musician since 2020 under the name Marlon, and performed at WOMADelaide as half of a musical duo known as Marlon x Rulla (stylised all caps). He is also involved with his cousin Daniel Motlop's native food business.

== Early life and family ==
Marlon has Aboriginal Australian heritage, with his father a Larrakia man and his mother Kungarakany, as well as Torres Strait Islander (Thursday Island) heritage.

His father insisted that he learn to play the guitar around the same time as developing his footballing career as a junior, and he would write songs with his cousins Daniel, Shannon and Steven, who would also go on to be AFL footballers.

== Football career ==
Originally from Wanderers Football Club in the Northern Territory Football League (NTFL), Motlop first gained the attention of AFL talent scouts when he won the Allan McLean best-and-fairest medal in the 2006 AFL Under-16 Division Two Championships. Motlop was selected by Port Adelaide in the 2007 AFL draft using their second pick, the 28th overall.

Motlop debuted against Melbourne Football Club in round 21 of the 2008 AFL season, contributing six kicks and eight handballs to his team's 78-point win. The following week, Motlop kicked his first AFL goal and collected 16 disposals in a 76-point victory over North Melbourne. He did not play another game in 2008, but returned in round 9 of the 2009 AFL season where he had a quiet game, registering four kicks and two handballs in a 55-point loss to the Sydney Swans. Round 11 saw Motlop kick one goal and collect 12 kicks and three handballs in a 24-point win over the Fremantle Dockers. In what turned out to be his final AFL match, Motlop did not score in his match against the Western Bulldogs, but did get 16 disposals. While not playing in the AFL, Motlop played with West Adelaide in the South Australian National Football League (SANFL).

Motlop was delisted by Port Adelaide at the end of the 2011 AFL season and moved to West Australian Football League (WAFL) club Swan Districts to continue his career in 2012, where he won the club's best and fairest award. Motlop moved to Peel Thunder for the 2013 season, also winning their club's best and fairest.

After a two-year stint in the WAFL, where Motlop played state representative football in 2013 against Victoria and registered 28 disposals, he went back to the SANFL where he continued his career at North Adelaide and went on to play 79 league games including representing South Australia in 2015, registering 24 disposals.

During Motlop’s time at North Adelaide, he came fourth in the club's best and fairest in 2014 and went on to win their Club Champion award in 2015. In 2018, Motlop signed with Glenelg, where has played until the end of the 2021 season.

== Music career ==
=== Marlon x Rulla ===
During his last year of playing football in the SANFL, Motlop started developing his career as a musician, playing as a band with team-mate Rulla Kelly-Mansell. The duo, as Mrln x Rkm, and with assistance from Northern Sound System's artist development program, opened for Midnight Oil and Vika and Linda at WOMADelaide in March 2021, along with other First Nations artists. Their performance was well-received and gained a glowing review in Rolling Stone Australia. They released their first single, "Black Swan" in June 2021.

The duo started performing as MARLON X RULLA around 2022, and as of 2026, they perform under this name.

==== Singles ====
List of singles
| Title | Year |
|---|---|
| "Black Swan" | 2021 |
| "Unceded" | 2022 |
| "Trauma Patient" | 2023 |

=== Solo work ===
Motlop performed at the Bass In the Grass Festival and the AFL's Sir Doug Nicholls Round. He released three tracks in 2021, and featured on Urthboy's Jangle Bells, with their collaboration track "Balmy Christmas Eve" releasing on 15 December 2021.

Motlop features on the 3% song "Blak Australia Policy" on their 2024 album, Kill the Dead.

== Bush food ==
Motlop is also involved with his cousin Daniel Motlop's native foods business, Something Wild, located in the Barossa Valley.
