= MC Pressure =

Pressure
- Also known as: MC Pressure
- Born: Daniel Smith; 19 December 1977 (age 48); Adelaide, South Australia, Australia
- Genre: Hip hop
- Years active: 1995–present
- Labels: Obese Records (2001–2008); Golden Era Records (2008–present)
- Website: Official website

Daniel Smith (born 19 December 1977), better known by his stage name Pressure, is an Australian rapper who serves as one of the MCs of the hip hop group Hilltop Hoods, formed in Adelaide, South Australia.

== Early life ==
Born in Adelaide, South Australia, Pressure attended Blackwood High School in the hills area of Adelaide and Suffa (Matt Lambert), his future bandmate, was a fellow student. The two established a friendship based on common musical ground and later met the third member of the Hilltop Hoods, DJ Debris (Barry Francis).

== Music career ==
Along with Suffa and DJ Next (later replaced by DJ Debris), Pressure formed the Hilltop Hoods in 1991, a trio that has since become one of the most popular hip hop groups in Australia, with six album releases, a record label, and over 644,000 Facebook fans (as of July 2025). In regard to the success that the Hilltop Hoods has achieved, Pressure has stated that the group has made a concerted effort to distinguish "self-belief from self-importance", explaining that "I would hate to think people see us as arrogant. That's how we are as people and it's reflected in the music. We're confident and outgoing people but I listen to some rappers and think, 'That's so arrogant, just pull your head in, mate."

After the Hilltop Hoods' album The Calling was listed at No. 23 in the "Hottest 100 Australian Albums of All Time" poll, conducted by national Australian radio station Triple J, Pressure and Suffa revealed in an interview with the station's magazine publication that the two bandmates have consistently engaged in one major argument during the production of each of the group's albums. While laughing, Pressure revealed during the interview, "It's not a record if we haven't had one big blowout during the making of it."

For the Hilltop Hoods' seventh studio album, Walking Under Stars, Smith composed the song "Through the Dark" about his son's struggle with cancer and explained in a promotional interview, published on 6 August 2014:

Writing that song is one of the hardest things I have ever done ... I wrote it and rewrote it and rewrote it throughout his therapy and he responded very well to the treatment so it became a song of hope and perseverance.

As of the interview date, Smith's son had not heard the track, as "He wants to wait for the album to come out before he listens to it." Smith said: "I might have to leave the room ... it might be a bit much."

Smith revealed in an October 2014 radio interview that the Splendour In The Grass event is his favorite festival to perform at in Australia.

== Golden Era records ==
As part of his role within the Hilltop Hoods, Pressure was involved with the founding of the Golden Era Records (GE) Australian hip hop label. Launched in 2009, with the release of the fifth Hilltop Hoods full-length album State of the Art, the label's roster also includes K21, Funkoars, Vents, Briggs and Adfu. According to the GE website, the label "wasn't established to release throw-back records; instead we hope to make music that throws you back to the way you felt during the golden era of Hip Hop. Whatever year that was for you."

== Personal life ==
He sold a home in Flagstaff Hill.

His son, Liam, was diagnosed with leukaemia in February 2013, but was in remission in August 2014. Smith explained in August 2014, following the release of Walking Under Stars: "He’s good now, he’s doing normal kid stuff, going to school and things like that. And there’s no sign of the cancer."
