= Illy discography =

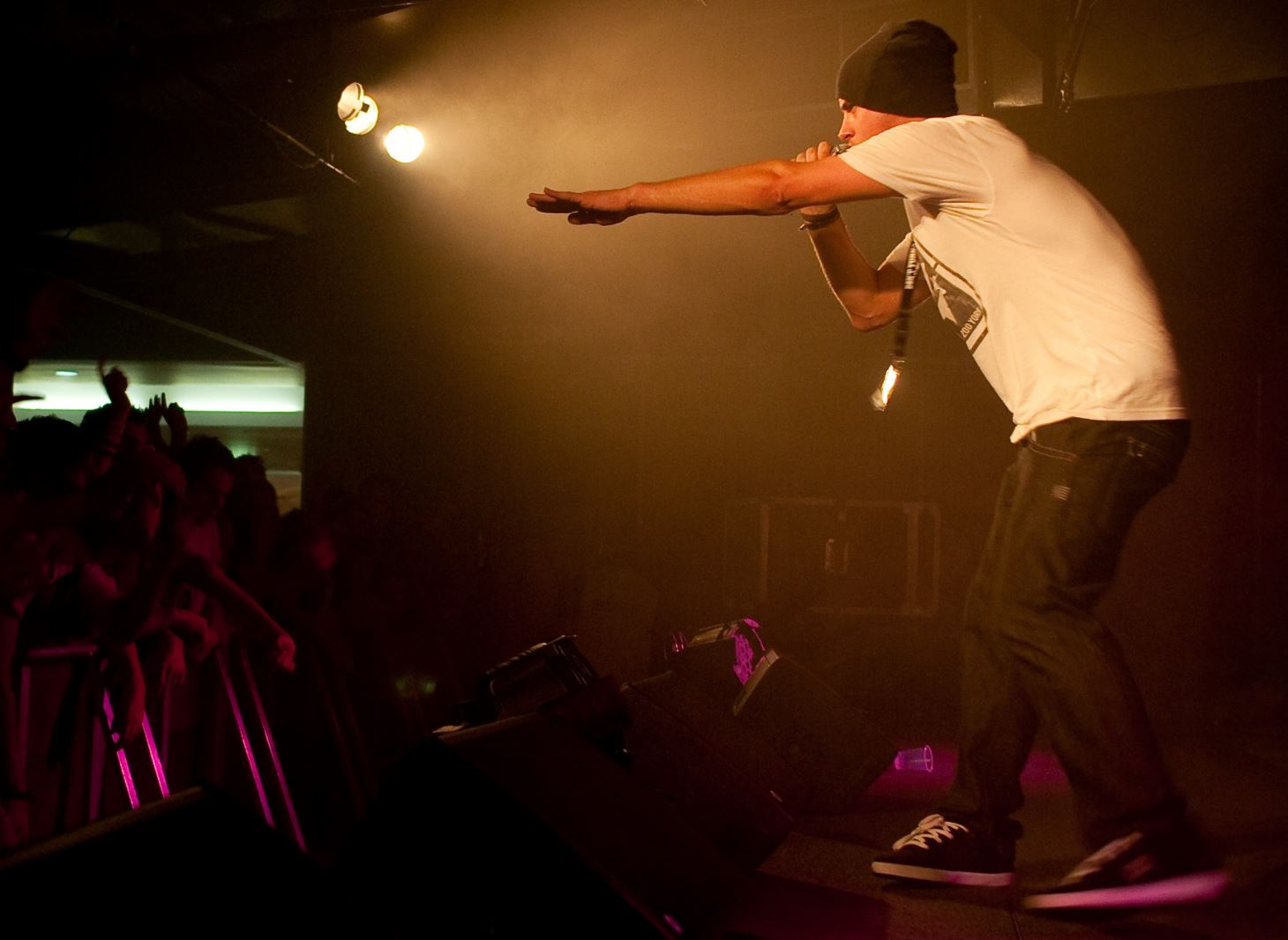
- Illy performing at the University of Tasmania in 2011
- Studio albums: 7
- Singles: 40

The discography of Illy, an Australian rapper, consists of seven studio albums and thirty-nine singles (included six as a featured artist).

== Studio albums ==
Title	Album details	Peak chart positions	Certifications
Title	Album details	AUS	Certifications
Long Story Short	Released: 15 April 2009; Label: Obese; Formats: CD, digital download	—	
The Chase	Released: 29 October 2010; Label: Obese; Formats: CD, digital download	25	
Bring It Back	Released: 21 September 2012; Label: Obese; Formats: CD, digital download	15	
Cinematic	Released: 8 November 2013; Label: Onetwo, Warner; Formats: CD, digital download	4	ARIA: Gold
Two Degrees	Released: 11 November 2016; Label: Onetwo, Warner; Formats: CD, digital download, streaming	1	
The Space Between	Released: 15 January 2021; Label: Sony Music Australia; Formats: CD, digital download, streaming	1	
Good Life	Released: 15 November 2024; Label: Warner; Formats: CD, digital download, streaming	4	
"—" denotes a recording that did not chart or was not released in that territory.

== Singles ==
=== As lead artist ===
List of singles, with year released, selected chart positions and certifications, and album name shown
Title	Year	Peak chart positions		Certifications	Album
Title	Year	AUS	NZ Hot	Certifications	Album
"Pictures"	2009	—	—		Long Story Short
"Generation Y"	2009	—	—		Long Story Short
"The Chase"	2010	—	—		The Chase
"It Can Wait" (featuring Owl Eyes)	2010	58	—	ARIA: Gold	The Chase
"Cigarettes" (featuring Hue Blanes)	2011	—	—		The Chase
"Heard It All"	2012	48	—	ARIA: Gold	Bring It Back
"Where Ya Been" (featuring Pez)	2012	84	—		Bring It Back
"On & On"	2013	60	—		Cinematic
"Youngbloods"	2013	38	—	ARIA: Gold	Cinematic
"Cinematic"	2013	—	—		Cinematic
"Tightrope" (featuring Scarlett Stevens)	2014	18	—	ARIA: 5× Platinum	Cinematic
"One for the City" (featuring Thomas Jules)	2014	63	—	ARIA: Gold	Cinematic
"Swear Jar"	2015	89	—	ARIA: Platinum	Non-album single
"Papercuts" (featuring Vera Blue)	2016	2	—	ARIA: 8× Platinum; RMNZ: Gold	Two Degrees
"Catch 22" (featuring Anne-Marie)	2016	11	—	ARIA: 3× Platinum	Two Degrees
"You Say When" (featuring Marko Penn)	2017	— (Note: "You Say When" did not enter the ARIA Australian Top 100 Singles, but peaked at number 13 on the Australian Top 40 Urban Singles chart.)			Two Degrees
"Oh My" (featuring Jenna McDougall)	2017	89	—	ARIA: Gold	Two Degrees
"Then What"	2019	33	—	ARIA: Platinum	The Space Between
"Codes"	2019	—	—		The Space Between
"Lean on Me" (featuring Robinson)	2019	90	39	ARIA: Gold	The Space Between
"Last Laugh"	2020	—	—		The Space Between
"Parmas in June"	2020	—	—		Non-album single
"Loose Ends" (featuring G Flip)	2020	— (Note: "Loose Ends" did not enter the ARIA Singles Chart, but did peak at number 4 on the ARIA Top 20 Australian Hip Hop/R&B Singles Chart.)	—		The Space Between
"Cheep Seats" (featuring Waax)	2020	—	—		The Space Between
"I Myself & Me"	2020	—	—		The Space Between
"Mirror" (featuring Wrabel)	2021	—	—		The Space Between
"Like You"	2022	—	—		Non-album single
"Hopeless" (featuring Indiana Massara)	2023	—	—		Non-album single
"Stubborn"	2024	—	—		Good Life
"Good Life"	2024	—	—		Good Life
"Kids" (featuring Sofia Reyes)	2024	—	—		Good Life
"Back to Work"	2026	—	—		TBA
"—" denotes a recording that did not chart or was not released in that territory.

=== As featured artist ===
List of singles, with year released, selected chart positions and certifications, and album name shown
Title	Year	Peak chart positions	Certifications	Album
Title	Year	AUS	Certifications	Album
"12345" (Way of the Eagle featuring Illy)	2014	—		Kodo
"Bright Dawn" (Kuren featuring Illy)	2017	—		Melting Conceptuality
"Exit Sign" (Hilltop Hoods featuring Illy and Ecca Vandal)	2019	16	ARIA: 6× Platinum; RMNZ: Gold	The Great Expanse
"I'll Be Fine" (Mashd N Kutcher featuring Illy)	2022	—		
"Tokyo" (C Watts featuring Illy)	2023	—		
"What Do I Know" (Drapht featuring Illy and Bronco)	2025	—		A Beautiful Day to Be Lonely
