= Lean on Me =

Lean on Me may refer to:

== Music ==
=== Albums ===
- Lean on Me (album), by Shirley Scott, 1972
- Lean on Me (EP), by Consumed by Fire, 2015
- Lean on Me, by Hanoi Rocks, 1992

=== Songs ===
- "Lean on Me" (song), by Bill Withers, 1972
- "Lean on Me", an Amazon Original remake of the above, by Old Dominion
- "Lean on Me" (Cheat Codes song), 2021
- "Lean on Me" (Kirk Franklin song), 1998
- "Lean on Me (Ah-Li-Ayo)", by Red Box, 1985
- "Lean on Me", by the Housemartins from London 0 Hull 4, 1986
- "Lean on Me", by Illy, 2019
- "Lean on Me", by Limp Bizkit from Greatest Hitz, 2005
- "Lean on Me", by Melba Moore from This Is It, 1976
- "Lean on Me", by the Redskins, 1983
- "Lean on Me", by Moby, from Ambient,1993
- "Lean on Me", by Sandro Cavazza, 2020
- "Lean on Me (Tonight)", by the Moody Blues from Keys of the Kingdom, 1991
- "Lean on Me", by Sandro Cavazza, 2020

== Film and television ==
- Lean on Me (film), a 1989 film directed by John G. Avildsen
- "Lean on Me" (The L Word: Generation Q), a 2021 television episode
