= Kristina Miltiadou =

- Origin: Melbourne, Australia
- Genres: R&B, Pop, Nu-wave
- Occupation: Singer-songwriter
- Years active: 2009–present
- Labels: Ministry of Sound

Kristina Miltiadou (born 12 May) is a Greek-Australian singer-songwriter based in Melbourne. She released her self-titled debut album in 2013 which featured her singles "Heartstrings" and "Carousel". She has an uncredited appearance in the album version of "Tightrope" by rapper Illy which became his first top twenty song in Australia in 2014.

== Early life ==
Kristina realised she could sing at the age of 8, particularly singing Mariah Carey songs who she grew up listening to, along with Destiny's Child, Michael Jackson and Prince. During her adolescence, she wrote a diary about how much she wanted to be a singer. She learned piano at 8 but rejected it for her ambitions at singing. Despite that, she used it for writing songs at 14 but rejected the instrument again. In an interview, she claimed that "I always knew when I wrote them on the piano that they were going to need harmonies and percussion and different sounds that weren't piano. I wanted to create a vibe but I didn't know exactly what it was and I new that piano didn't have anything to do with it".

== Discography ==
=== Studio albums ===
Title	Year	
Title	Year	AUS
"Kristina Miltiadou" released 8 February 2013	2013	

=== Singles ===
Year	Title	Producer(s)	Album
2012	"Heartstrings"	Francois Tetaz	Kristina Miltiadou
2012	"Carousel"	Francois Tetaz	Kristina Miltiadou
