= AIR Awards of 2011 =

Annual Australian music awards ceremony

- Date: 12 October 2011
- Venue: Revolt Art Space, Melbourne, Australia

Highlights
- Most wins: The Jezabels (2)
- Most nominations: Adalita and Seekae (4)
- Website: https://air.org.au/air-awards/

The AIR Awards of 2011 (or Jägermeister Independent Awards of 2011) is the sixth annual Australian Independent Record Labels Association Music Awards (generally known as the AIR Awards) and was an award ceremony at Revolt Art Space, in Melbourne, Australia on 12 October 2011. The event was again sponsored by German liquor brand, Jägermeister.

The event was broadcast on Australian pay-TV music broadcaster Channel V.

This year was the first for the category, Best Independent Dance, Electronica or Club Single and the win was another first, with it being a tie. The award was shared by Tommy Trash and Tom Piper's "All My Friends" and Seekae's "Blood Bank".

== Performers ==
- Adalita
- Emma Louise
- The Holidays
- Illy and Owl Eyes

== Nominees and winners ==
=== AIR Awards ===
Winners are listed first and highlighted in boldface; other final nominees are listed alphabetically.

Best Independent Artist	Best Independent Album
**The Jezabels**; Abbe May; Adalita; Art vs. Science; Seekae	**Adalita - Adalita** (Liberation Music); Abbe May - Design Desire (Source Music); Art vs. Science - The Experiment (Independent); Drapht - The Life of Riley (The Ayems); Seekae - +Dome (Rice Is Nice/Popfrenzy)
Best Independent Single/EP	Best Breakthrough Independent Artist
**The Jezabels: Dark Storm** (Independent); Adalita - "Hot Air" (Liberation Music); Emma Louise - Full Hearts & Empty Rooms (Emma Louise); Illy featuring Owl Eyes - "It Can Wait" (Obese); Stonefield - Through the Clover (Shock Entertainment)	**Emma Louise**; Adalita; Big Scary; Busby Marou; Oscar & Martin; The Holidays
Best Independent Blues and Roots Album	Best Independent Country Album
**Geoffrey Gurrumul Yunupingu - Rrakala**; Blue King Brown - Worldwize (Part 1, The North and South); Bonjah - Go Go Chaos; Busby Marou - Busby Marou; Jordie Lane - Blood Thinner	**Wagons - Rumble Shake and Tumble**; Davidson Brothers - Here to Stay; Halfway - An Outpost of Promise; Kasey Chambers - Little Bird; Shane Nicholson - Bad Machines; Troy Cassar-Daley - Troy Cassar-Daley Live
Best Independent Dance/Electronica Album	Best Independent Dance/Electronica or Club Single
**Pnau - Soft Universe**; Art vs. Science - Art vs. Science; Seekae - +Dome; The Aston Shuffle - Seventeen Past Midnight; The Potbelleez - Destination Now	**Seekae - "Blood Bank"**; **Tommy Trash and Tom Piper featuring Mr. Wilson - "All My Friends"**; Collarbones - "Don Juan"; Pnau - "Solid Ground"; Tonite Only - "We Run the Night"
Best Independent Hard Rock or Punk Album	Best Independent Hip Hop/Urban Album
**My Disco - Little Joy**; Cosmic Psychos - Florious Basterds; Front End Loader - Ritardando; Harmony - Harmony; Trial Kennedy - Living Undesigned	**Drapht - The Life of Riley**; Bliss N Eso - Walking on Air; Illy - The Chase; Joelistics - Voyager; Sietta - The Seventh Passenger
Best Independent Jazz Album
**Sandy Evans - When the Sky Cries Rainbows**; Allan Browne, Marc Hannaford, Sam Anning - Shreveport Stomp; Daniel Gassin Sextet - Daniel Gassin Sextet; Elixir featuring Katie Noonan - First Seed Ripening; Mark Isaacs Resurgence Band - Aurora; Shannan Barnett Quartet - Country

=== AIR Awards (public voted) ===
Jagermeister Most Hunted Award (Popular Voted Award by Fans)
- **360**

== See also ==
- Music of Australia
