= Snarling at Strangers =

Studio album by TZU
- Released: 2006
- Genre: Australian hip hop
- Length: 1:02:14 (Disc 1) and 19:31 (Disc 2)
- Label: P & C Liberation Music
- Producer: TZU, Magoo

TZU chronology
Smiling at Strangers (2005)	Snarling at Strangers (2006)	Computer Love (2008)

Snarling at Strangers is a re-release of TZU's second studio album, Smiling at Strangers. Repackaged as a double album, Snarling at Strangers was released in 2006 to coincide with a nationwide tour. The first disc of the album contains all the songs from the original album, while the second disc features five previously unreleased tracks that weren't included on the original album as the band felt they were too dark and political in comparison to the rest of the album's more light-hearted tones. The second disc also includes the music videos for Dam Busters and Wild Stylee, two singles from their debut album, Position Correction, as well as a live recording of She Gets Up, recorded as part of Yahoo Music's "Who's Next" sessions.

== Track listing ==
Disc 1: Smile

1. "Hey OK" - 3:23
2. "She Gets Up" - 4:00
3. "Logical" - 2:50
4. "Recoil" - 5:00
5. "TZU Blues (Sweet Little Hoochie)" - 4:31
6. "Won't Get Played" - 3:52
7. "Coming Round" - 6:16
8. "In Front Of Me" - 3:38
9. "Back To Front" - 3:09
10. "Reminisce" - 4:52
11. "Lounge" - 4:09
12. "Raise 'Em Up" - 3:13
13. "Unnecessarily Blue" - 5:21
14. "Unnecessarily Blue (Remix)" - 7:55

Disc 2: Snarl

1. "Pacman" - 3:42
2. "City" - 3:09
3. "Gone" - 3:28
4. "On A Train" - 4:33
5. "Listen" - 4:39
