= TZU =

Australian hip hop group

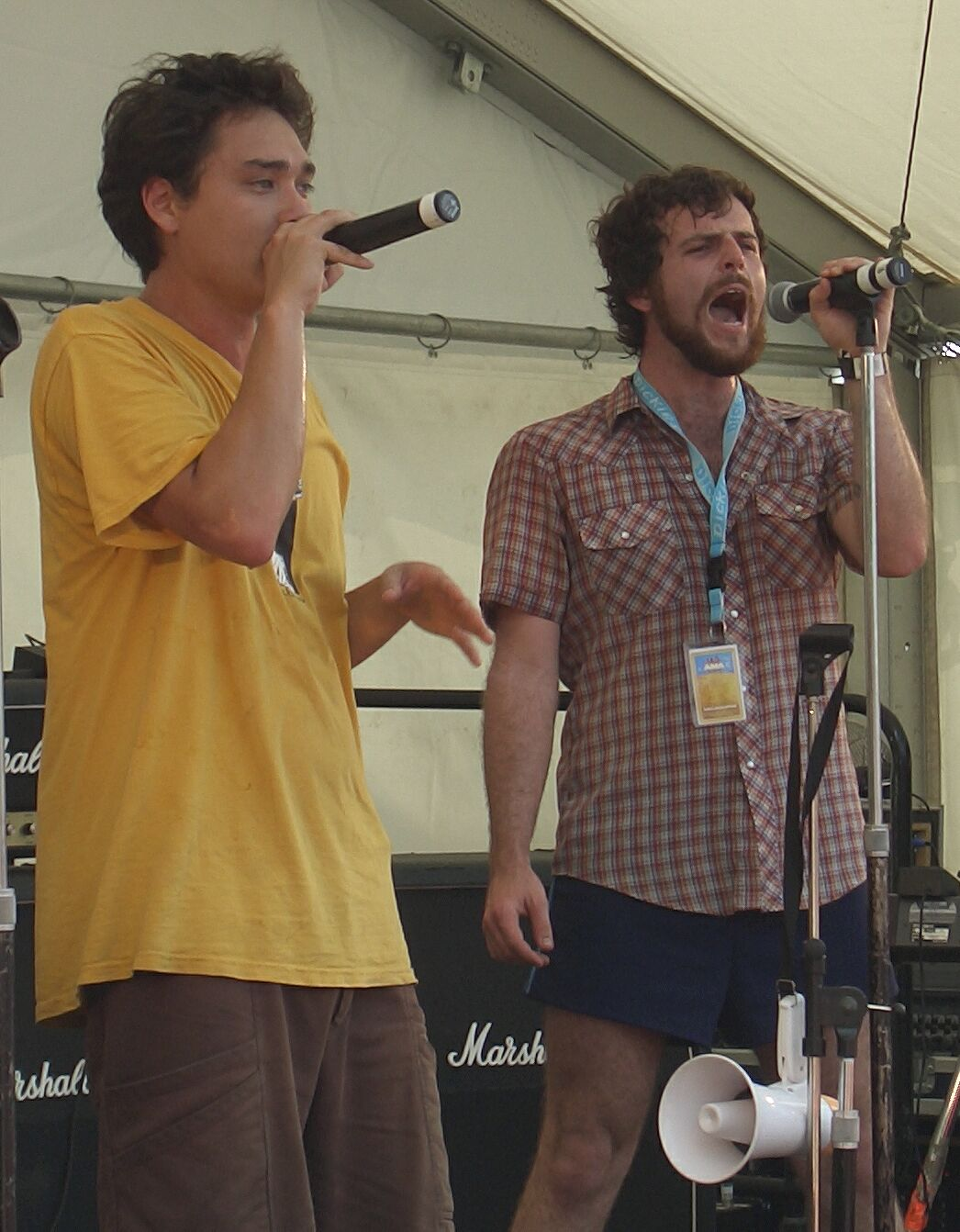
- TZU (Joelistics, left, and Seed MC, right) performing at Big Day Out in Melbourne, 2006

Background information
- Origin: Melbourne, Victoria, Australia
- Genre: Australian hip hop
- Years active: 1999–2013
- Label: Liberation
- Past members: Joel Ma p.k.a. Joelistics; Corey McGregor p.k.a. Yeroc; Phillip Norman p.k.a. Count Bounce; Shehab Tariq p.k.a. Paso Bionic
- Website: www.tzu.com.au

TZU (pronounced "Tee Zed Yoo") were an Australian hip hop group, formed in 1999 by Joelistics, Yeroc, Seed MC and Paso Bionic. The band used live instruments in their recordings and live performances, giving their shows a rock-infused feeling. TZU released four studio albums, Position Correction (2004), Smiling at Strangers (2005), Computer Love (2008, which peaked in the ARIA Charts top 30) and Millions of Moments (2012), before disbanding in 2013.

== History ==
=== 1999–2004: Formation, Um... Just a Liddlbidova Mic Check and Position Correction ===
TZU was initially formed in 1999 in Melbourne as a side project by members of Pan and Curse ov Dialect. The line-up consisted of Joel Ma (p.k.a. Joelistics) and Phillip "Pip" Norman, (p.k.a. Seed MC, later known as Count Bounce) on vocals, Corey McGregor (p.k.a. Yeroc) on drums and samplers, and Shehab Tariq (p.k.a. Paso Bionic) on turntables.

According to Joelistics, the group's name is taken from the Chinese philosopher Lao Tzu, which was suggested by Lee Hartney of The Smith Street Band. Stylised in all caps as TZU, the pronunciation of the band's name was changed from its original Chinese pronunciation to "Tee Zed Yoo" to add an "element of mystery." Their debut extended play (EP), Um... Just A Liddlbidova Mic Check, was recorded in a portable studio in the back of a friend's truck parked near Hobart, and released in 2001. Local Noise's Tony Mitchell described it as "tentative." After the EP's release, the four signed to Liberation Music. The following year, they recorded the track "L Plates" for the Obese Records compilation album Culture of Kings Vol. 2, which was also included in a re-release of Um... Just A Liddlbidova Mic Check with slightly updated cover art.

On February 19 2004, TZU released their debut album, Position Correction. The album was co-produced by Seed and Yeroc and peaked just outside the ARIA Charts Top 100 in March. Greg Lawrence of WHAMMO described how the quartet are "a bunch of true technicians who successfully transmit their love for beats and lyrics. The double-pronged vocal attack is more exact than the scalpel of a master surgeon, the subterranean bass growls and snappy beats are premium." Tony Mitchell felt "[it] covers a wide range of moods, styles and tempos, and represents another new direction in Australian hip-hop coming from an idiosyncratic Melbourne push which is making an important impact on local indigenisations of the genre."

=== 2005–2009: Smiling at Strangers and Computer Love ===
In 2005, TZU issued their second studio album, Smiling at Strangers, which was produced by Magoo. It reached the ARIA Albums Chart top 100 in late September. Mitchell noticed, "[they] can successfully combine rock and hip hop... through a desire to experiment with and stretch the often restrictive parameters of MCing and Djing." Simon Jones of Soulshine compared it to their debut album, "[they] have taken a more instrument-based approach in the studio, leaving behind the beats and samples of their debut Position Correction and replacing them with guitars, piano, drums and the occasional horn line." In February 2006 the album was short-listed for the inaugural Australian Music Prize for releases in 2005.

In February–March 2006, they won Yahoo! Music's "Who's Next" monthly music public-voted poll. In November of that year they re-released Smiling at Strangers as a limited edition 2×CD, Snarling at Strangers, which, along with the original album's fourteen tracks, included a second five-track disc, Snarl, and three music videos. The additional, previously unreleased tracks were described by Tristan of There Is no Roseability as, "a harsh critique of current politics/society. It's not as militaristic or angry as The Herd's material, but it's harsh nonetheless. It still has the genius wit and timelessness of Australian hip-hop."

On June 28, 2008, the band released their third studio album, Computer Love. Rolling Stone Australia said "Melbourne group TZU just can't stop upping the ante ... They meld classic eighties electro with the more traditional funk keeping the emphasis on authenticity and class throughout." Inpress said "Computer Love is full of old school synth's, masterful sampling and live instrumentation - a maverick in its field and release that will set a new standard for the Australian music landscape."

Richard Kingsmill, Musical Director of Australian radio station Triple J, stated in regard to the band's 2008 J Award nomination for Computer Love, "They open their album saying "TZU still feelin' awesome". I couldn't agree more. They keep growing as an act and expanding on their influences. This album has so much life and they're doing all this themselves. No mentors, producers or anyone getting in the way. Pure talent." The band performed a cover of You Am I's "Heavy Heart" for Triple J's Like A Version that same year. and released a remixed version of Computer Love, Cover Up Motel, the following year.

=== 2010–2013: Millions of Moments and disbandment, ===
In 2011, Joelistics signed to independent Sydney-based hip-hop label Elefant Traks as a solo artist, prior to the release of his debut album, Voyager.

In 2012, after a period of inactivity, TZU released their fourth and final album Millions of Moments. The album is a concept album about a woman named Persephone who test-trials a mind-altering drug called Chronos which takes her through the minds of various people in different points in time. The concept stemmed from Joelistics' travels in Asia, as he explains in an interview with Beat:

“I was constantly in front of screens [...] laptops and phones and being outside the environment I was in. Like being in Mongolia on a train and still being in front of my laptop! Chronos became this idea of being addicted to experiences that aren’t yours – the idea of Chronos is that you’re inside the consciousness of someone else in a different time period, so you’re not actually an active participant of that person’s experience … you’re just a passenger to what’s happening to them.”

Sonically, the album takes a detour from hip-hop to opt for a darker, more experimential electronic pop sound. In the same interview with Beat, Joelistics delved into the reasoning behind this:

“It wasn’t that we didn’t want to make a hip hop record, as much as it was that we just followed our noses into the sound of the record. It wasn’t like trying to alienate ourselves from our past or anything like that – it was simply… I reckon the reason this album particularly is very un-hip hop, at the heart of it, is that there’s always been this side of the band where we get together and do all the out-takes from our old albums in these slow, sort of instrumental jams. And in every album, there’s probably three or four slow, psychedelic songs that never got released; unfinished, quite electronic and a bit nerdy! When we came together for those first few weeks [of recording], that was the side that – you know, if there wasn’t going to be any outcome from this, let’s do what we’ve always wanted to do. ‘Set up at your station with your synths and your samplers and let’s jam!’ That was the spirit of it, and that’s what led us to not do a hip hop record; we’ve really got to indulge that side of us.”

To promote the album, they went on tour. The following year, the group disbanded without making any public statements about their reasoning.

=== 2014-present: Post-TZU endeavours ===
Following the group's disbandment, Joelistics and Count Bounce continued writing and producing for other artists, with Joelistics also continuing his career as a solo artist. In 2017, Joelistics revealed in a Facebook post that the Madonna song "Veni Vidi Vici" started out as a demo that he and Dustin McLean wrote that ended up in the hands of producer M-Phazes. M-Phazes worked on the demo before passing it on to an unnamed colleague in the United States, who then gave it to Madonna to use for her new album, Rebel Heart. The song was featured on the deluxe edition of the album, but Joelistics and McLean were not given songwriting credits upon the album's release in March 2015. This was later corrected in September 2017, with the two receiving credits and 1.5% in royalties each.

In 2024, all four members of TZU were briefly reunited for one of the Elefant Traks 25th Anniversary concerts. The following year, Joelistics released the single "Terrific", which featured vocals from Count Bounce (credited under his old stage name, Seed MC) and turntablism from Paso Bionic, marking the first time the three have recorded a song together since 2013. Yeroc was absent from the collaboration as he is no longer an active musician.

== Members ==
- Joel Ma p.k.a. Joelistics – vocals, guitar, bass guitar
- Phillip "Pip" Norman p.k.a. Seed MC / Countb Bounce – vocals, guitar, bass guitar
- Corey McGregor p.k.a. Yeroc – drums, samplers
- Shehab Tariq p.k.a. Paso Bionic – turntables

== Discography ==
=== Studio albums ===
List of studio albums with selected details and chart positions
Title	Details	Peak chart positions
Title	Details	AUS
Position Correction	Released: 19 February 2004; Label: Liberation Music (LIBCD6122.2); Format: CD	—
Smiling at Strangers	Released: September 2005; Label: Liberation Music (LIBCD7176.2); Format: CD, CD+CD-ROM	71
Computer Love	Released: June 2008; Label: Liberation Music (LMCD0012); Format: CD, CD+CD-ROM	23
Millions of Moments	Released: 2012; Label: Liberation Music (9341004016194); Format: CD, Digital download, LP	57

=== Remix albums ===
List of remix albums, with selected details
Title	Details
Cover Up Motel	Released: 2009; Label: Liberation Music (LMCD0037); Format: 2×CD

=== Extended plays ===
List of extended plays
Title	Details
Um... Just a Liddlbidova Mic Check	Released: 2001; Label: TZU; Format: CD
The Position Selection	Released: 2004; Label: Liberation Music; Format: LP

=== Singles ===
List of singles, with selected chart positions
Title	Year	Peak chart positions	Album
Title	Year	AUS	Album
"Dam Busters"	2003	—	Position Correction
"The Horse You Rode in On"	2003	—	Position Correction
"Wildstylee"	2004	—	Position Correction
"She Gets Up"	2005	—	Smiling at Strangers
"In Front of Me"	2006	51	Smiling at Strangers
"Computer Love"	2008	—	Computer Love
"Beginning of the End"	2012	—	Millions of Moments
"Beautiful"	2012	—	Millions of Moments

== Awards and nominations ==
=== APRA Awards ===
The APRA Awards are held in Australia and New Zealand by the Australasian Performing Right Association to recognise songwriting skills, sales and airplay performance by its members annually.

Year	Nominee / work	Award	Result
2007	"In Front of Me"	Most Performed Urban Work	Nominated

=== Australian Music Prize ===
The Australian Music Prize (the AMP) is an annual award of $30,000 given to an Australian band or solo artist in recognition of the merit of an album released during the year of award. They commenced in 2005.

Year	Nominee / work	Award	Result
2005	Smiling at Strangers	Australian Music Prize	Nominated

=== J Awards ===
The J Awards are an annual series of Australian music awards that were established by the Australian Broadcasting Corporation's youth-focused radio station Triple J. They commenced in 2005.

Year	Nominee / work	Award	Result
2008	Computer Love	Australian Album of the Year	Nominated
