= Computer Love =

Computer Love may refer to:

- Computer Love (album), an album by Australian artists TZU
- "Computer Love" (Zapp song)
- "Computer Love" (Kraftwerk song)
- "Computer Love", a song by the band Eruption
