= The Space Between (Illy album) =

Studio album by Illy
- Released: 15 January 2021
- Recorded: 2017–2020
- Length: 50:37
- Label: Illy (independent); Sony Music Australia

Illy chronology
Two Degrees (2016)	The Space Between (2021)	Good Life (2024)

Singles from The Space Between
- 1. "Then What" Released: 24 May 2019; 2. "Codes" Released: 26 July 2019; 3. "Lean On Me" Released: 27 September 2019; 4. "Last Laugh" Released: 14 February 2020; 5. "Loose Ends" Released: 17 July 2020; 6. "Cheap Seats" Released: 6 November 2020; 7. "I Myself & Me" Released: 11 December 2020; 8. "Mirror" Released: 15 January 2021

The Space Between is the sixth studio album by Australian rapper Illy, released independently on 15 January 2021 through Sony Music Australia.

At the 2021 ARIA Music Awards, M-Phazes was nominated for Producer of the Year for work on this album.

== Background ==
The album was recorded over three years, between his home town of Melbourne and international cities including New York, Los Angeles and Berlin, with Illy declaring the album "his most personal to date". Illy said "The Space Between is about change; how much there is from one point to the next and how those trips – not the destinations – define us." He added "My music has always been about real life, and since last time we spoke, mine happened between albums – relationships, parties, therapy, triumphs, breakdowns, celebrations, mourning; all of it.. I learnt to keep it moving, but also to stop and appreciate where you're at, because the one constant is change. I'm thankful for all of it. It all made this album."

== Release ==
The album was completed in March 2020 and was originally set for release in May 2020, but was delayed due to the COVID-19 pandemic. The album's January 2021 release date was announced in October 2020.

== Reception ==
Professional ratings
Review scores
Source	Rating

Cyclone Wehner from Music Feeds said "A decade on from Long Story Short, Illy continues to diversify creatively, but he isn't sacrificing authenticity for aesthetics. Ultimately, Illy manages to centre his art while avoiding pretension. The Space Between is a manifesto of dynamism."

== Track listing ==
1. "Wave" – 3:44
2. "Loose Ends" (featuring G Flip) – 3:56
3. "No Feelings" (featuring Carla Wehbe) – 3:37
4. "Codes" – 3:03
5. "Mirror" (featuring Wrabel) – 3:41
6. "I Myself & Me" – 3:38
7. "Last Laugh" – 2:51
8. "Cheap Seats" (featuring Waax) – 3:06
9. "Then What" – 3:02
10. "Lean on Me" (featuring Robinson) – 3:47
11. "Race to the Bottom" – 4:29
12. "Lonely" (featuring Guy Sebastian) – 3:29
13. "The Space Between" – 4:54
14. "Best Mistakes" – 4:09

== Charts ==
Chart performance for The Space Between
Chart (2021)	Peak position
Australian Albums (ARIA)	1
