= Primary Colours (Eddy Current Suppression Ring album) =

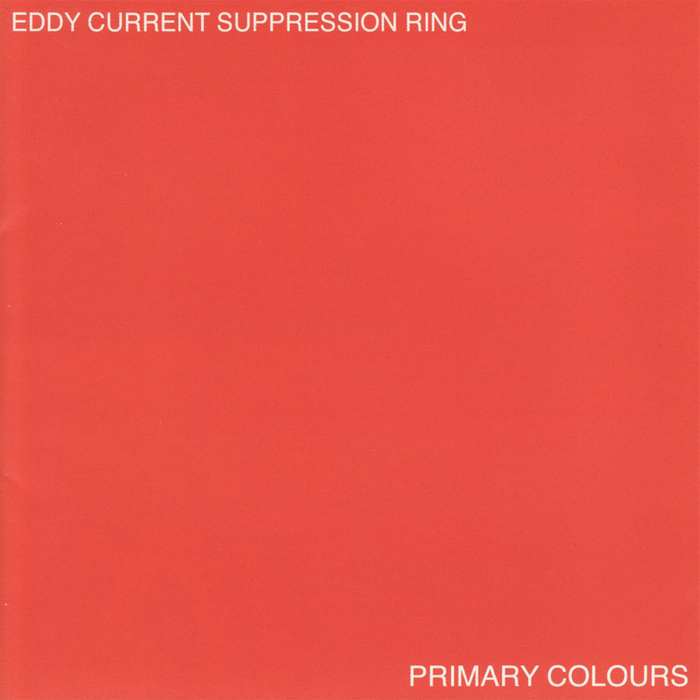

Studio album by Eddy Current Suppression Ring
- Released: 5 May 2008
- Recorded: 3–4 August 2007
- Studios: Sing Sing Studios, South Yarra, Victoria
- Genres: Punk rock; garage rock
- Length: 37:46
- Labels: Aarght!, Goner, Melodic
- Producer: Eddy Current Suppression Ring

Eddy Current Suppression Ring chronology
Eddy Current Suppression Ring (2006)	Primary Colours (2008)	Rush to Relax (2010)

Singles from Primary Colours
- 1. "Which Way to Go" Released: Mid-2008

Primary Colours is the second album by Australian garage punk band Eddy Current Suppression Ring. The album was recorded in a suburb of Melbourne over a 24-hour period in August 2007. The album was first released on Aarght! Records in Australia only on 5 May 2008, then on 9 September 2008 on Goner Records in the United States, and finally in the United Kingdom on Melodic Records on 17 August 2009. "Which Way to Go" was the only single released from Primary Colours.

At the J Awards of 2008, the album was nominated for Australian Album of the Year.

Primary Colours peaked at No. 13 on the ARIA Hitseekers Chart in June 2008. It received generally positive reviews from critics, who praised the album's minimalistic sound and warm, personable lyrics. It won the Australian Music Prize in 2008, and was nominated for the ARIA Award that same year for best rock album, but lost to The Living End's entry, White Noise.

== Background and recording ==
Eddy Current Suppression Ring formed in 2004, as a group of friends writing and performing songs together for fun. They decided to keep making their music when they discovered that other people liked it. The band recorded their first song as a trio, at a vinyl pressing plant where Eddy Current (real name Mikey Young) was working at the time. After they took a liking to the resulting song, they recruited Rob Solid (real name Brad Barry) to play bass guitar. The group recorded their debut self-titled album in four hours in a rehearsal studio, and released it in 2006 on the Australian label Dropkick Records.

They recorded Primary Colours over the night of 3 August 2007 and part of the following day, in the Melbourne suburb of South Yarra on an 8-track, a form of multi-track recording. The process of recording it took 24 hours and cost $1500. The day after recording finished, the band and their engineer, Lachlan Wooden, added overdubs to the ten tracks. After recording, Eddy Current Suppression Ring toured the US for three weeks, after which Eddy Current, the band's guitarist, mixed the album during November and December 2007. The four members self-produced Primary Colours.

Eddy Current Suppression Ring's lead singer, Brendan Suppression (real name Brendan Huntley), explained the choice of Primary Colours as its title, saying that the band chose it because they "believe...that something beautiful can be made through simple colours or notes or lyrics". In an interview with The Age, Suppression also said that Primary Colours's title refers to the way that everything is made up of a combination of simple things, as all colours are made by combining primary colours.

Primary Colours was originally released in Australia on 5 May 2008 on Eddy Current Suppression Ring's own label, Aarght! Records, before being issued on 9 September 2008 in the United States on Goner Records. In Australia it was distributed by Shock Records. "Which Way to Go" was released as the only single. The following year, on 17 August, Primary Colours was re-released on Melodic Records in the United Kingdom, in conjunction with the band's eponymous debut album. On this release, the album's title was stylised with a "+" symbol at the end, with Primary Colours denoted as "CD1". Primary Colours was originally presented in one of three different album covers – one red, one yellow, and one blue.

== Music and lyrics ==
The lyrics on Primary Colours often focus on mundane topics pertaining to the lives of ordinary people, including watching TV and eating ice cream, while its music often features shredding power chords. According to The Washington Post's Chris Richards, the music represents a new, gentler type of punk rock in the vein of No Age and Abe Vigoda. Richards also wrote that Suppression "[keeps] these upbeat rock tunes from becoming too saccharine with a nervy delivery that's part David Byrne, part Iggy Pop". A similar sentiment was expressed by David Bevan of Pitchfork Media, who wrote "there's a softening of edges taking place throughout, a band testing limits after having already refined them". He also described it as an "artfully polished extension of its predecessor". Current described the album as "a bit more '82ish than the '76ish sound of our first LP, slightly less frantic and maybe a bit more palatable".

The album's opening track, "Memory Lane", begins with guitar chopping described by Emily Mackay as "Stones-meets-Stooges rifforama". The second track on the album, "Sunday's Coming," is an "all-out skronkfest" featuring "whiplash guitars" and "so-nonchalant-they’re-muffled vocals". "Wrapped Up" contains "ribbons of guitar melody" matched with an "equally warm refrain". "Colour Television" consists of "five minutes of unhurried, snaky buildups" resembling the sound of The Pixies and Future of the Left. "That's Inside of Me" is a "Feelies-esque instrumental" with a "herky-jerky funk groove". The "glumly confessional" "I Admit My Faults" focuses on the same mood for its entire duration. "Which Way to Go", the album's single, begins with heavy riffage, then segues to the verse, then the chorus, then repeats from the beginning. The song's "sharp riffs, fiery speak-sing vocals and constant forward momentum" exemplify the band's typical sound. "You Let Me Be Honest with You" is centred on a lead guitar solo from Current. "We'll Be Turned On" sees Eddy Current Suppression Ring using an organ, and Suppression making an especially "goofy turn". "I Don't Wanna Play No More" features a single-note piano riff that recalls "I Wanna Be Your Dog".

== Reception ==
Professional ratings
Review scores
Source	Rating
AllMusic	4/5 stars
Drowned in Sound	8/10
The Guardian	5/5 stars
MSN Music (Consumer Guide)	A−
NME	7/10
Pitchfork	8.2/10
Spin	8/10

Primary Colours received generally positive critical reception, so much so that Eddy Current Suppression Ring's front man, Current, remarked that it was "weird" because he didn't "know if anyone's said a bad word about it". Bevan awarded Primary Colours a rating of 8.2 out of 10. Robert Christgau gave the album a rating of A−, which, according to him, corresponds to "the kind of garden-variety good record that is the great luxury of musical micromarketing and overproduction". He also wrote that they do "the same thing punk bands have always done" and described the album as a "recurring miracle." Chris Richards compared the album to many early punk and post-punk bands such as "a breezier Stooges" or "The Fall with less squall". He concluded that the album was "the most righteous rock-and-roll moment of 2008". A more mixed review written by Emily Mackay awarded Primary Colours a rating of 7 out of 10 and criticised it for its lack of originality.

Many critics also praised Current's guitar work on the album, with Richards writing that his riffs "come ripping from his amplifier like sunbeams through a smog of distortion". Writing for Spin, Chuck Eddy wrote that Current's guitar chords "soar Byrds-like or surf Ventures-like out of melodic stomps that seem basic, but aren't". K. Ross Hoffman, writing for Allmusic, praised the song "Wrapped Up" for its "strong, slinky riff", while Bevan praised it for the way it "runs along some really beautiful ribbons of guitar melody".

=== Accolades and commercial performance ===
On 20 March 2009, Primary Colours won the $30,000 Australian Music Prize for the previous year, defeating eight other nominees, including Cut Copy and the Presets. Eddy Current Suppression Ring told Triple J that they didn't expect their recording plans to change significantly as a result of the win, but that they might be able to do them more quickly. At the ARIA Music Awards of 2008, it was nominated in the category "Best Rock Album", but lost to The Living End's entry, White Noise. Current described this nomination as "nice, but mainly hilarious".

Primary Colours was featured on several critics' year-end lists, including the 2008 Pazz & Jop (No. 73), the Washington Post's David Malitz's top 10 albums of 2008 (No. 5), and The Guardian's 2009 critics' poll (No. 28). Primary Colours peaked at No. 13 on the ARIA Hitseekers Chart on 2 June 2008.

== Track listing ==
All tracks are written by Brendan Suppression (real name Brendan Huntley), Eddy Current (real name Mikey Young), Danny Current (real name Danny Young), and Rob Solid (real name Brad Barry)

No.	Title	Length
1.	"Memory Lane"	3:35
2.	"Sunday's Coming"	2:49
3.	"Wrapped Up"	3:17
4.	"Colour Television"	4:53
5.	"That's Inside of Me"	4:22
6.	"I Admit My Faults"	5:25
7.	"Which Way to Go"	3:16
8.	"You Let Me Be Honest with You"	2:43
9.	"We'll Be Turned On"	2:51
10.	"I Don't Wanna Play No More"	4:35

== Personnel ==
- Brendan Suppression (real name Brendan Huntley) – vocals, synthesizer
- Eddy Current (real name Mikey Young) – guitar, keyboards, tambourine, mixing
- Danny Current (real name Danny Young) – drums
- Rob Solid (real name Brad Barry) – bass guitar
- Joseph Carra – mastering
- Lachlan Wooden – engineer
- Eddy Current Suppression Ring – producer
