= Smiling at Strangers =

Studio album by TZU
- Released: 2005
- Recorded: Sing Sing Studios
- Genre: Australian hip hop
- Length: 1:02:14
- Label: Liberation Music
- Producers: TZU, Magoo

TZU chronology
Position Correction (2003)	Smiling at Strangers (2005)	Snarling at Strangers (2006)

Singles from Smiling at Strangers
- 1. "She Gets Up" Released: 2005; 2. "In Front Of Me" Released: 2006

Smiling at Strangers is the second studio album by TZU, released in September 2005. The album was produced by Magoo and released under the Liberation Music record label. The album peaked at number 71 on the ARIA charts, and the following year, was re-released as a limited edition double album titled Snarling at Strangers, featuring a second disc with five previously unreleased songs and three music videos.

== Track listing ==
1. "Hey OK" - 3:23
2. "She Gets Up" - 4:00
3. "Logical" - 2:50
4. "Recoil" - 5:00
5. "TZU Blues (Sweet Little Hoochie)" - 4:31
6. "Won't Get Played" - 5:52
7. "Coming Round" - 6:16
8. "In Front Of Me" - 3:38
9. "Back To Front" - 3:09
10. "Reminisce" - 4:52
11. "Lounge" - 4:09
12. "Raise 'Em Up" - 3:13
13. "Unnecessarily Blue" - 5:21
14. "Unnecessarily Blue (Remix)" - 7:55

== Charts ==
Chart performance for Smiling at Strangers
Chart (2005)	Peak position
Australian Albums (ARIA)	71
