= Trouble (Flight Facilities song) =

2024 song by Flight Facilities and Owl Eyes

Single by Flight Facilities and Owl Eyes
- Released: 24 February 2024
- Length: 3:20
- Label: Future Classic
- Songwriters: Brooke Addamo, Jack Glass Hugo Gruzman, James Lyell
- Producers: Jack Glass, Flight Facilities

Flight Facilities singles chronology
"Dollar $hort" (2023)	"Trouble" (2024)	"Days of the Week" (2024)

Owl Eyes singles chronology
"Tokyo" (2020)	"Trouble" (2024)

Music video
- "Trouble" on YouTube

"Trouble" is a song written and recorded by Australian electronic music production duo Flight Facilities and Owl Eyes. It was released in February 2024.

The group said "'Trouble', in many ways, is a return to our origins in taste, influence and collaboration. Working with Owl Eyes and Bag Raiders’ Jack Glass, to reference some turn-of-the-century dance-pop was such a natural fit. We've always had a special nostalgia for the 2000s, so any excuse to inject its sound into today is one we'll take." Owl Eyes continued saying "This silly little song is an ode to the chaotic energy of those early touring years with my lifelong friends Jimmy and Hugo. It's also an anthem for anyone with a fun party alter ego."

The song was promoted in North America with the Trouble Tour.

== Reception ==
Tom Di Salvo from Life Without Andy said "The tune itself sounds like it could easily be found in the early 2000s volume of the duo's now-legendary decades mix – you could easily imagine catching it on Rage in between some Madison Avenue and Kylie Minogue."

AAA Backstage described the song as "A contemporary ode to dance music's golden era".

== Track listings ==
Digital download

1. "Trouble" – 3:20

Digital download

1. "Trouble" (Chloe Chaillet remix) – 4:30

== Charts ==
Weekly chart performance for "Trouble"
Chart (2024–2025)	Peak position
Belarus Airplay (TopHit)	20
CIS Airplay (TopHit)	26
Estonia Airplay (TopHit)	64
Kazakhstan Airplay (TopHit)	6
Latvia Airplay (TopHit)	9
Russia Airplay (TopHit)	18
