= It Can Wait =

Single by Illy featuring Owl Eyes

from the album The Chase
- Released: 24 October 2010
- Length: 3:36
- Label: Obese
- Songwriter(s): Alasdair Murray, Jan Skubiszewski, Brooke Addamo
- Producer(s): Jan Skubiszewski

Illy singles chronology
"The Chase" (2010)	"It Can Wait" (2010)	"Cigarettes" (2011)

Owl Eyes singles chronology
"1+1" (2010)	"It Can Wait" (2010)	"Faces" (2011)

"It Can Wait" is a song by Australian rapper Illy, featuring Owl Eyes and was released in October 2010 as the second single from Illy's second studio album, The Chase. "It Can Wait" peaked at number 58 on the ARIA Charts and was certified gold in Australia in 2011.

"It Can Wait" was listed at number 29 on the Triple J Hottest 100, 2010.

At the AIR Awards of 2011, the song was nominated for Best Independent single.

== Charts ==
Chart (2010–11)	Position
Australia (ARIA Charts)	58

== Certifications ==
Region	Certification	Certified units/sales
Australia (ARIA)	Gold	35,000^{^}
^{^} Shipments figures based on certification alone.
