= Numbers Radio =

- Origin: Brisbane, Queensland, Australia
- Genres: Rock, punk rock, alternative rock
- Years active: 2008–present
- Labels: Valley Trash Records, Shock Records
- Members: Dave Orr; Robbie Carlyon; Mark Henman

Numbers Radio are an Australian hard rock band formed in Brisbane, Queensland in 2008. The band is made up of Dave Orr (guitars-vocals) Robbie Carlyon (bass-vocals) and Mark Henman (drums). Numbers Radio first came to attention when they won a national youth radio competition, Triple J Unearthed, securing them a spot at Homebake and they received national airplay on Triple J. The band is well known for being extremely proficient musicians across a variety of genres including Blues, Funk, Jazz, and Ska Punk.

== Origins ==
Orr and Carlyon have been lifelong friends who met in grade 3 and have shared in a variety of music projects. They formed Numbers Radio out of a love for mid 1990s punk rock and skateboarding. Drummer Mark Henmanm, previously best known for playing in hip hop and funk acts such as Resin Dogs and Afro Dizzi Act also shared a passion for heavy guitar based punk rock. The trio met in 2008 when one of Orr and Carlyon's previous funk bands needed a drummer, which Henman filled in for. At soundcheck, the band skipped the funk and went straight for the heavy riffs and Numbers Radio was born.

== Self-titled debut EP (2008) ==
Numbers Radio's first release was a self-titled EP released in 2008, and was produced by bass player Carlyon, and Brisbane producer Jeff Lovejoy, in a garage.

This session spawned single 'Come On' which lead to the band winning Triple J Unearthed, and performing at Valley Fiesta, and 'Come On' being added to hi-rotation on Triple J. 'Come On' became the 8th highest played song on Triple J in August 2008.

== Debut Album – Acquiring Satellites (2009) ==
The band released their debut album Acquiring Satellites in September 2009 through Valley Trash Records. Again there was radio success with singles 'Boring' and 'Automatic' being added to hi-rotation on Triple J, and 'Boring' becoming the 2nd most played song on Triple J for April 2009.

The band were amongst the top 50 most played Australian artists on Triple J in 2009.

== Final Day – EP (2010) ==
In October 2010 Numbers Radio released a 7 track EP entitled 'Final Day'. The title track Final Day was added to hi-rotation on Triple J in September 2009, and by November it had become the 10th most played Australian song on triple j for that month.

== Touring and Support Shows ==
Numbers Radio have toured Australia extensively, both with their own headline tours, as well as supporting large acts. They first major support show came when supporting ARIA Award Winners Birds of Tokyo on their North Queensland tour. In 2009 the band performed with Mariachi El Bronx and The Bronx at the Hi Fi in Brisbane. In 2010 the band toured as main support to rock band Calling All Cars for a 17 date nation tour including regional areas.

In 2011 Numbers Radio completed a co-headline east coast tour with Cola Wars, formerly Bodyjar. They also supported Jebediah & Violent Soho on a 3 date Queendsland tour. They supported Airbourne on the 3 date Queensland leg of their national tour. They toured North Queensland with ARIA award-winning band Eskimo Joe, and towards the end of 2011 Numbers Radio toured with Wolfmother on a 9 date east coast regional tour.

In March 2012 Numbers Radio announced their biggest tour to date as the main support for prog rock band The Butterfly Effect which is a 22 date national tour.

== New Album in 2012 ==
In November 2011 the band announced they had signed a deal with Shock Records to release their forthcoming album due in mid-2012. The label first saw the band perform at the Big Sound music industry conference in Brisbane in September and signed a deal shortly after.

On 15 February 2012 the band debut a brand new single called 'Tokyo' on influential Triple J radio program Home & Hosed.

== Discography ==
- Numbers Radio ep (2008)
- Acquiring Satellites (2009) – Valley Trash Records
- Final Day ep (Nov 2010)

== Awards and nominations ==
=== J Award ===
The J Awards are an annual series of Australian music awards that were established by the Australian Broadcasting Corporation's youth-focused radio station Triple J. They commenced in 2005.

Year	Nominee / work	Award	Result
J Awards of 2008	themselves	Unearthed Artist of the Year	Nominated
