= Then What (Illy song) =

Single by Illy

from the album The Space Between
- Released: 24 May 2019
- Length: 3:01
- Label: Sony

Illy singles chronology
| "Exit Sign" (2019) | "Then What" (2019) | "Codes" (2019) |

"Then What" is a song by Australian rapper Illy and was released in May 2019 as the lead single from Illy's forthcoming sixth studio album, The Space Between (2021). "Then What" peaked at number 33 on the ARIA Charts and was certified platinum.

"Then What" was written about the changes since Illy's last album Two Degrees in 2016 and its success. Illy told Ben & Liam on Triple J "You notice people come around that weren't there before. When the times are good, they're there, and inevitably you sort of go quiet, start working on new stuff and they're not around anymore. It's not something to get bummed about, I find it funny because it's a cliché but it's true. I wanted to write a song addressing that."

At the APRA Music Awards of 2020, "Then What" was nominated for Most Performed Urban Work of the Year.

== Reception ==
Zanda Wilson from The Music Network said "('Then What') is cut from the same cloth as some of his biggest radio hits, with Illy's clean and energetic combination of rapping and singing underpinned by production with pop sensibilities."

== Charts ==
=== Weekly charts ===
| Chart (2019) | Peak position |
|---|---|
| Australia (ARIA) | 33 |

=== Year-end charts ===
| Chart (2019) | Position |
|---|---|
| Australian Artist (ARIA) | 21 |

== Certifications ==
| Region | Certification | Certified units/sales |
|---|---|---|
| Australia (ARIA) | Platinum | 70,000^{‡} |
^{‡} Sales+streaming figures based on certification alone.
