= On & On (Illy song) =

Single by Illy

from the album Cinematic
- Released: 21 June 2013
- Length: 3:06
- Label: ONETWO
- Songwriters: Alasdair Murray, Jan Skubiszewski
- Producer: M-Phazes

Illy singles chronology
"Where Ya Been" (2012)	"On & On" (2013)	"Youngbloods" (2013)

"On & On" is a song by Australian rapper Illy, and was released on 21 June 2015 as the lead single from Illy's fourth studio album, Cinematic. "On & On" was the first release on Illy's own record label ONETWO and peaked at number 60 on the ARIA Charts in August 2013. The song features uncredited vocals from Australian pop singer Asta.

== Reception ==
Nic Kelly from Project U said the song "showcases what Illy is all about – a strong delivery, catchy hooks and a thick beat".

== Charts ==
Chart (2013)	Position
Australia (ARIA Charts)	60
