= Cassette Kids =

Australian indie rock band

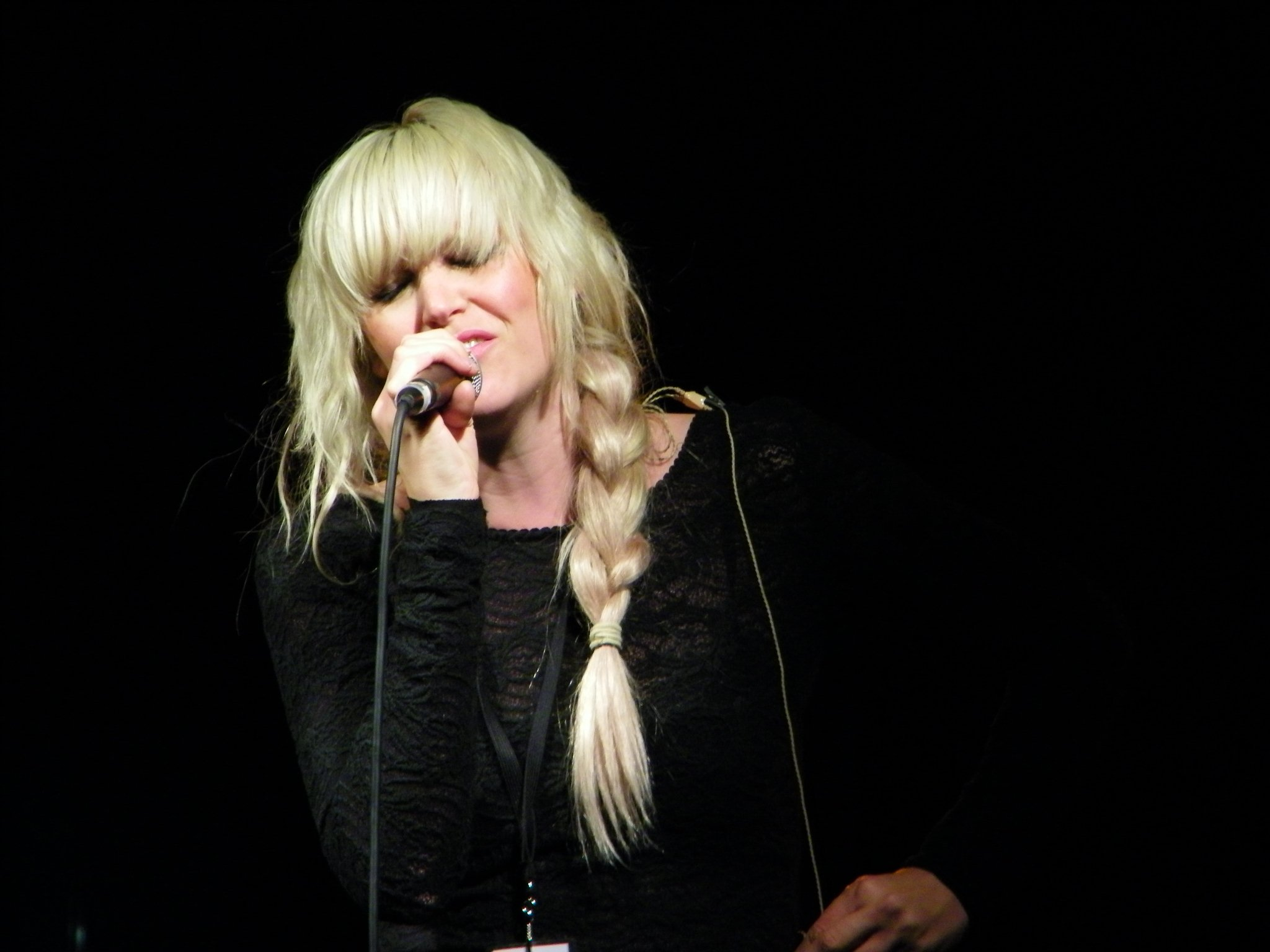
- Katrina Noorbergen leading Cassette Kids at the Northbridge Festival, 2009

Background information
- Origin: Sydney, Australia
- Genres: Indie rock
- Years active: 2007–present
- Labels: Sony BMG
- Members: Daniel Schober; Jacob Read-Harber; Daniel Deitz; Katrina Noorbergen
- Website: www.myspace.com/cassettekids

Cassette Kids are a Sydney-based band formed in 2007. They won the Unearthed Sydney 2008 Big Day Out competition and were nominated for a 2008 Unearthed J Award. Their song "You Take It" was a Triple J's Ausmusic Month featured track and had a video made for it which has appeared on Channel V, MTV and rage. Another song, "Acrobat", was on high rotation on Triple J. In October 2008 they released their debut mini album We Are. The band have toured nationally with The Presets, as well as British pop singer Lily Allen, The Fratellis, Ben Lee, Bluejuice, The Music and New Young Pony Club. In October 2009, Cassette Kids released the single "Lying Around", which appears on their debut album Nothing on TV, released on 16 April 2010.

== Background ==
Previously named Casa Del Disco, the band changed their name to Cassette Kids because every member of the band was born in the '80s and could all remember the first cassette they ever got, but could not remember their first CD.

== Members ==
- Daniel Schober – guitar
- Jacob Read-Harber – drums
- Daniel Deitz – bass
- Katrina Noorbergen – vocals

== Discography ==
=== Albums ===
List of albums, with selected details
Title	Details
Nothing On TV	Released: April 2010; Format: CD; Label: Sony Music Australia (88697683472)

=== EPs ===
List of EPs, with selected details
Title	Details
We Are	Released: 2008; Format: CD; Label: Sony Music Australia (88697406612)
Lying Around	Released: 2009; Format: CD; Label: Sony Music Australia (88697603702)

== Awards and nominations ==
=== J Award ===
The J Awards are an annual series of Australian music awards that were established by the Australian Broadcasting Corporation's youth-focused radio station Triple J. They commenced in 2005.

Year	Nominee / work	Award	Result
J Awards of 2008	themselves	Unearthed Artist of the Year	Nominated
