= J Awards of 2008 =

Annual Australian music awards

- Date: 5 December 2008
- Venue: Oxford Art Factory, Sydney, Australia
- Website: abc.net.au/triplej

The J Award of 2008 is the fourth annual J Awards, established by the Australian Broadcasting Corporation's youth-focused radio station Triple J. The announcement comes at the culmination of Ausmusic Month (November). In 2008, a new award for Australian Music Video of the Year was added to the existing awards; Australian Album of the Year and Unearthed Artist of the Year. Robbie Ruck announced the winners on air on 5 December 2008.

== Who's eligible? ==
Any Australian album released independently or through a record company, or sent to Triple J in consideration for airplay, is eligible for the J Award. The 2008 nominations for Australian Album of the Year and Australian Music Video of the Year were selected from releases received by Triple J between December 2007 and November 2008. For Unearthed Artist of the Year it was open to any artist from the Unearthed (talent contest), who has had a ground breaking and impactful 12 months from November 2007 and October 2008.

== Awards ==
=== Australian Album of the Year ===
Artist	Album Title	Result
The Presets	Apocalypso	Won
Nick Cave and the Bad Seeds	Dig, Lazarus, Dig!!!	Nominated
Cut Copy	In Ghost Colours	Nominated
Cog	Sharing Space	Nominated
Birds of Tokyo	Universes	Nominated
Bliss n Eso	Flying Colours	Nominated
TZU	Computer Love	Nominated
Primary Colours	Eddy Current Suppression Ring	Nominated
Postcards	Sparkadia	Nominated
The Grates	Teeth Lost, Hearts Won	Nominated
Augie March	Watch Me Disappear	Nominated
The Drones	Havilah	Nominated

=== Australian Video of the Year ===
Director	Artist and Song	Result
Mike Daly	The Herd - "2020"	Won
Josh Groom, Angus and Julia Stone	Angus and Julia Stone - "Just a Boy"	Nominated
Callum Cooper	TZU - "Computer Love"	Nominated
Kris Moyes	The Presets - "My People"	Nominated
Sam Bryant	Josh Pyke - "Make You Happy"	Nominated

=== Unearthed Artist of the Year ===
Artist	Notes	Result
John Steel Singers	From Queensland, winners of Unearthed's Brisbane leg of 2008 Big Day Out, The John Steel Singers have shared the stage with Polyphonic Spree (USA), Built To Spill (USA), Kelley Stoltz (USA), The Brunettes (NZ), The Panics and The Panda Band, performing at the "Playground Weekender", "Was I There In Your Future?", "Essential Festival" and "Come Together Music Festival".	Won
Art vs. Science	Won the Splendour in the Grass Unearthed competition and have also played at Parklife, and are scheduled to perform at the upcoming Falls Festival.	Nominated
Cassette Kids	Were the Unearthed winners of the 2008 Big Day Out (Sydney leg) and have completed a national tour supporting The Presets.	Nominated
City Riots	From South Australia, played the 2008 Big Day Out (Adelaide leg) and Fuse Festival in Adelaide, then flew overseas to play the Great Escape Festival in the UK, playing sideshows at the Camden Barfly, and international pop festival in Liverpool. The band then played a five-week tour of the United States, taking in Milwaukee's Summerfest with The Bravery, Wave Gathering Festival in Asbury Park, New Jersey.	Nominated
Harlequin League	From Western Australia, the Unearthed winners on the 2008 Big Day Out (Perth leg) and have supported The Freestylers (UK), The Cops, Regurgitator, Expatriate, The Panda Band, Dardanelles, and The Checks.	Nominated
Numbers Radio	Won the Valley Fiesta Unearthed Competition.	Nominated
