= Nothing on TV =

Studio album by Cassette Kids
- Released: April 16, 2010 (Australia)
- Recorded: 2009
- Genre: Synthpop, dance-punk
- Label: Sony BMG
- Producer: Richard Wilkinson/Michael Di Francesco

Nothing on TV is the debut album by Australian band Cassette Kids.

== Track listing ==
1. "Insomnia" - 4:04
2. "Spin" - 3:36
3. "Lying Around" - 3:25
4. "Coming Back" - 3:44
5. "Big Jerk" - 4:22
6. "Freaky Sweetie" - 3:34
7. "Game Player" - 3:34
8. "You Shot Me" - 3:43
9. "Nothing on TV" - 3:29
10. "Wherever You Are" - 3:57
11. "Hey Baby" - 3:34
12. "Fatal Attraction" - 3:41
13. "Outro" - 1:40
14. "By the Roadside" - 3:17
