= Leave Me Lonely (Hilltop Hoods song) =

2018 hip hop song

Single by Hilltop Hoods

from the album The Great Expanse
- Released: 23 November 2018
- Genre: Australian hip-hop
- Length: 3:14
- Label: Universal Music Australia
- Songwriters: Matthew David Lambert and Daniel Howe Smith, DJ Debris (Barry John M. Francis), Richard Berry and Leigh Roy Ryan

Hilltop Hoods singles chronology
"Clark Griswold" (2018)	"Leave Me Lonely" (2018)	"Exit Sign" (2019)

"Leave Me Lonely" is a song by Australian hip hop group Hilltop Hoods from their eighth studio album The Great Expanse. It was released as the second single from the album on 23 November 2018.

At the ARIA Music Awards of 2019, the album was nominated for Song of the Year.

At the APRA Music Awards of 2020, the song won Most Performed Urban Work of the Year.

== Chart performance ==
The song peaked at No. 11 on the ARIA Singles Chart, making it Hilltop Hoods' ninth top 40 single. The song was certified 6× Platinum by ARIA in 2024.

== Charts ==
=== Weekly charts ===
Chart (2018–19)	Peak position
Australia (ARIA)	11

=== Year-end charts ===
Chart (2019)	Position
Australia (ARIA)	43

== Certifications ==
Region	Certification	Certified units/sales
Australia (ARIA)	6× Platinum	420,000^{‡}
New Zealand (RMNZ)	Platinum	30,000^{‡}
^{‡} Sales+streaming figures based on certification alone.
