= Eddy Current Suppression Ring =

Australian musical group

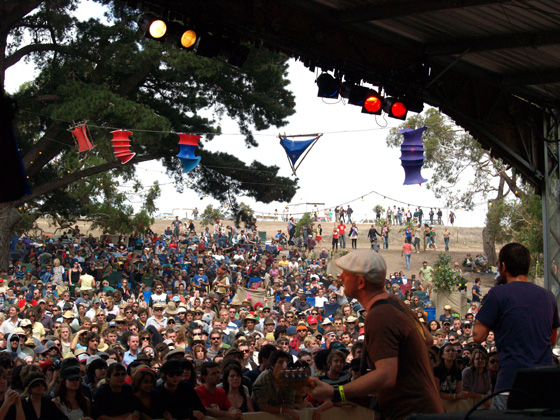
- ECSR at Golden Plains Festival, Meredith, March 2007

Background information
- Also known as: ECSR
- Origin: Melbourne, Victoria, Australia
- Genres: Garage rock; garage punk; indie rock
- Years active: 2003–2010, 2015–2016, 2018–2020, 2025–present
- Labels: Corduroy; Dropkick; Aarght!; Shock; Fuse; Castle Face
- Members: Daniel Young; Michael Young; Brendan Huntley; Brad Barry
- Website: eddycurrentsuppressionring.bandcamp.com

Eddy Current Suppression Ring (often abbreviated as ECSR) are an Australian garage rock band originating from Melbourne. Formed in 2003, the band consists of Daniel Young p.k.a. "Danny Current" on drums, his brother Michael Young p.k.a. "Eddy Current" on lead guitar and keyboard, Brendan Huntley p.k.a. "Brendan Suppression" on lead vocals and Brad Barry p.k.a. "Rob Solid" on bass guitar. They have released five studio albums; Eddy Current Suppression Ring (October 2006), Primary Colours (May 2008), Rush to Relax (February 2010), All in Good Time (December 2019) and In Light of Recent Events (May 2026).

At the ARIA Music Awards of 2008, Primary Colours was nominated for Best Rock Album. It won the Australian Music Prize of $30,000 for the band in March 2009. Rush to Relax peaked at No. 20 on the ARIA Albums chart and was listed in the book, 100 Best Australian Albums (2010). At the ARIA Music Awards of 2010 it was nominated for Best Rock Album and Best Independent Release.

== History ==
=== 2003–2005: Formation and early years ===
Eddy Current Suppression Ring (ECSR) formed in late 2003 in Melbourne, when brothers Daniel and Michael Young began jamming at a Christmas party at the Corduroy Records vinyl pressing plant in Highett, where Michael was employed. A colleague, Brendan Huntley, was encouraged to ad-lib vocals into a tape recorder. The subsequent tape provided "So Many Things", which became the B-side of the band's first single, "Get Up Morning" (2004), released via Corduroy Records. The band were later joined by Brad Barry (Rob Solid) on bass guitar.

The band is named for an electrical component of a transformer which subdues eddy currents after Eddy recalled their pressing plant's handyman explaining about fixing the eddy current suppression ring. Australian musicologist, Ian McFarlane, observed they are a "new breed of no-frills garage punk groups that played by their own rules." Their sound is influenced by the Troggs, the Standells, X and the Pagans. Tim Scott of Mess+Noise refers to the band's Australian delivery, "their brand of proto-punk doesn't pretend to be anything that it ain't. Just good old-time Aussie rock, sans the gimmicks."

In 2004, they started to build a dedicated fan base at venues such as Pony, Town Hall Hotel and The Espy, and during Streetparty nights at One Six One and The Stage. Their debut single, "Get Up Morning" was described by Natalie Salvo of TheDwarf.com.au, "[they] showcase music that sounds like the Buzzcocks going surfing." While its B-side, "So Many Things", which was recorded by the three-piece line-up (before Rob Solid joined), is "a mostly spoken, bile-infused poison pen to an ex-lover and it brims with fuzz." "It's All Square" (2005) is the group's second single, which Lachie of Youth Central declared was "a punky blast that features an insanely catchy refrain... this is one band which you don't mind having stuck in your head." Their first major performance was at the Meredith Music Festival in December 2005.

=== 2006–2009: Debut album to Primary Colours ===
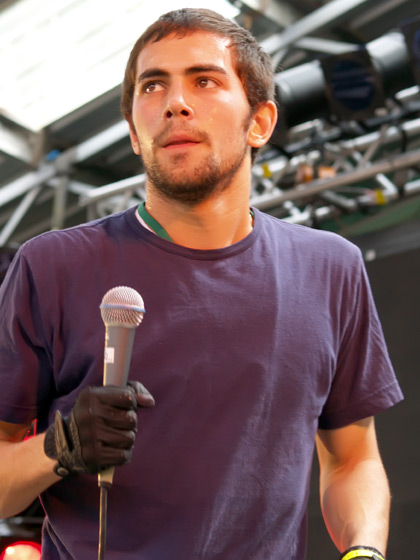
Lead singer Brendan Suppression (Brendan Huntley), Golden Plains Festival March 2007

In October 2006 the group released their first studio album, an eponymous effort for Dropkick Records and distributed by Shock Records. They had used Caulfield Rehearsal Studios on 25 February 2006 to record it in four hours. It received critical acclaim: AllMusic's Mark Deming noticed, "[it's] dominated by tough, hooky tunes, no-frills musicianship, and Brendan's broad Australian accent" while his associate Rick Anderson rated it as three-and-a-half stars out-of-five, "The world can always use another blast of clattery, rusty-razor-edged, two-chords-is-plenty-thank-you punk rock." Lachie of Youth Central determined, "[they] play 60s/70s-influenced punky garage rock, and play it well. Live, they are catchy, raw and full of a refreshingly innocent energy. On record, they are much the same."

The band performed at the Big Day Out festival in Melbourne in January 2007. They attended the inaugural Golden Plains Festival in March of that year, followed by a gig at Cherry Rock in May. "Demon's Demand" was written for the independent film, Constructing Fear and was issued as a single in September. Phil of TheDwarf, an Australian music publication, described the song as, "a working class tale, part grunge, part industrial, part Sex Pistols-esque geezer punk."

In May 2008 the band released its second studio album, Primary Colours. It was recorded at Sing Sing Studios, Melbourne on an eight-track tape machine for Aarght Records/Shock Records. Although it did not reach the ARIA Top 100 Albums chart, it peaked at No. 13 on the ARIA Hitseekers Albums chart. Deming writes, "[it] became an unexpected crossover success", while his associate K. Ross Hoffman rated it as four-out-of-five stars, "[they] tap in to the primal, fun-loving energy of frill-free rock & roll, a spirit that feels every bit as immediate and relevant as it is familiar and timeless."

Also in May 2008, ECSR and fellow Melbourne band, UV Race (Tom Hardisty, Al Montfort, Georgia Rose and Daniel Stewart) performed a live set at Missing Link Records' local store, which was later released in July as a split album on a music cassette, Live at Missing Link, via Aarght Records/Stained Circles. It was re-released on CD and vinyl LP in 2012 by the U.S. label Almost Ready Records.

At the ARIA Music Awards of 2008, Primary Colours was nominated for Best Rock Album – their first ARIA nomination. In October it was nominated for the J Awards, as a candidate for the radio station Triple J's Australian album of the year. In November Primary Colours was named Best Independent Hard Rock/Punk Release at the AIR Awards of 2008. In March 2009 the band won $30,000 with Australian Music Prize for Primary Colours. In January 2022 Rolling Stone Australia listed the album at No.41 of its 200 Greatest Australian Albums of All Time.

=== 2010–current: Rush to Relax to All in Good Time ===
Rush to Relax is the group's third studio album, which appeared in February 2010 and was recorded live-in-the-studio with Mikey Young producing. Mikey (Eddy) and Huntley (Suppression) spoke with Triple J's Zan Rowe about their recording session: they used a double-booked rehearsal space for six hours at zero cost. They explained that song writing and preparation occurred before entering the studio and post-production mixing at Mikey's home was minimal. It peaked at No. 20 on the ARIA Albums chart. Nate Knaebel of AllMusic scored it at four-out-of-five, "unexpectedly loose, protean feel of Rush to Relax makes for a wholly satisfying step forward from one of Australia's finest bands."

In October Rush to Relax was listed at No. 45 in the book 100 Best Australian Albums (2010). The authors observed, "[it] took [them] beyond their DIY attitude... [and] transcends what was already appealing about their prior work." At the ARIA Music Awards of 2010 it was nominated for Best Rock Album and Best Independent Release. It was also short-listed for the Australian Music Prize. After an album launch attracted 1800 people, Mikey reflected, "I had to question whether I'd want to go see a band like mine at a show that big... I was humbled, but a bit weirded out at the same time." The group went into hiatus while individual members undertook side projects (see below).

After their five-year hiatus the band reconvened in September 2015 prior to headlining the Golden Plains Festival in March 2016. Initially it was expected to be a "one-off" show. Mikey Cahill of The Herald Sun caught their performance, "[they] are the finest, fiercest garage rock band in the world — equally dumb and smart." In a review of Bad//Dreems' album Gutful (April 2017), music journalist Andrew Stafford bemoaned ECSR's absence from the music scene, they are "sorely missed" in these "lean times for guitar-based rock music" and the "rise of Donald Trump." Stafford finds "the influence of Eddy Current is palpable... on a few songs."

ECSR resumed jamming in 2018 and decided they would start writing material for their fourth studio album, All in Good Time, which was released in December 2019 on Castle Face Records. It was recorded by Mikey (Eddy) on 19 and 20 May at Singing Bird, Frankston. Tim Sendra of AllMusic gave it four-out-of-five stars, "classic thudding ECSR-style punk served up with jagged guitar riffs, sneering vocals, and tons of wire-sharp energy. Stafford, writing for Guardian Australia, noticed, "[it] is more contained and not as explosive as their first two albums, both of which were recorded in a matter of hours for a pittance." The band were supposed to tour in April 2020, although this was ultimately cancelled outright owing to the then-nascent COVID-19 pandemic.

After playing a string of secret shows in 2025, the band officially announced their return in July 2025 with the announcement of a free show in Melbourne's Federation Square.

=== Side projects ===
Eddy Current Suppression Ring's members have undertaken various side projects outside the band's activities. Danny started a tattooing business. His brother Mikey formed Ooga Boogas, as a pop rock group with Per Byström on drums, Les Stacpole on vocals and guitar and Richard Stanley on bass guitar. They issued a single, "The Octopus Is Back", in September 2007. Mikey, Byström and Stanley had started their own label, Aarght Records, earlier in that year. They followed with their debut album, Romance and Adventure, in September 2008. Andy Tighe of RTRFM 92.1 felt, "[its] well structured and cleverly crafted collective of tracks, but a poor production... as though it was written and recorded during the too much treble portion of the early 70's." Their self-titled second album appeared in February 2013. Mess+Noise's Patrick Emery declared them, "best band in the world" and explained that they "got everything: post-punk electronica, dirty-arse surf rock, elegant garage pop and everything in between."

Mikey Young, as Mikey Squires, formed an electro duo, Brain Children, with Max Kohane p.k.a. Max Crumbs (Agents of Abhorrence's drummer, Catcall's producer), which released an eponymous six-track extended play in June 2009 via Stained Circles. ThreeThousand's Samantha Chater felt it was, "crust punks making disco," which "sounds like the best thing to hit Melbourne dance-floors." He formed synth punk outfit, Total Control in 2008 with two members of label mates, UV Race: Al Montford on guitar and Daniel Stewart on vocals plus Zephyr Pavey on bass guitar and James Vinciguerra on drums. The group released a run of singles, "whenever time allowed" while "shifting styles dramatically." They issued two albums, Henge Beat (August 2011) and Typical System (2014). AllMusic's Fred Thomas noted that Henge Beat provided, "an amalgamation of the various cold styles that wove through their previous singles."

Huntley formed Boomgates in 2010 in Melbourne, initially a loose arrangement of friends jamming, with Shaun Gionis on drums, Stephanie Hughes on guitar and vocals, Angus Lords on guitar and Rick Milovanovic on bass guitar. They issued three singles before their debut album, Double Natural, appeared in 2012 via Brisbane label, Bedroom Suck Records. Outside of music Huntley works as a visual artist creating ceramic figures and oil-based paintings.

== Members ==
Credits:

- Daniel Young p.k.a. Danny Current – drums
- Michael Young p.k.a. Eddy or Mikey Current – lead guitar, keyboards
- Brendan Huntley p.k.a. Brendan Suppression – lead vocals
- Brad Barry p.k.a. Rob Solid – bass guitar

== Discography ==
=== Studio albums ===
Title	Details	Peak chart positions
Title	Details	AUS
Eddy Current Suppression Ring	Released: 30 October 2006; Label: Dropkick Records/Shock Records (BEHIND035); Format: CD, digital download	—
Primary Colours	Released: 5 May 2008; Label: Aarght! Records, Shock Records (AARGHT005); Format: CD, LP, digital download	—
Rush to Relax	Released: February 2010; Label: Shock Records (SR003); Format: CD, LP, digital download	20
All in Good Time	Released: 13 December 2019; Label: Castle Face Records (CF126); Format: CD, LP, digital download	—
In Light of Recent Events	Released: 26 May 2026; Format: LP, digital download	—

=== Live albums ===
Title	Details
Live at the Avenue	Released: 2005; Label: Eddy Current Suppression Ring; Format: CD; Note: Given away free at gigs
Live at Missing Link (by UV Race/Eddy Current Suppression Ring)	Released: 2008 (split album); Label: Aarght! Records/Stained Circles, Shock Records (AARGHT008); Format: Cassette, digital download

=== Compilation albums ===
Title	Details
So Many Things	Released: 2011; Label: Fuse Music Group (SR04); Format: LP

=== Singles ===
Year	Title	Album
2004	"Get Up Morning"	Eddy Current Suppression Ring
2005	"It's All Square"	Eddy Current Suppression Ring
2006	"Boy Can I Dance Good"	non album single
2007	"You Let Me Be Honest With You"	Primary Colours
2008	"Which Way to Go"	Primary Colours
2008	"Demon's Demands" / "I'm Guilty"	non album single
2009	"That Time of Day"	So Many Things
2010	"Wet Cement"	So Many Things
2010	"There's a Lot of It Going Around"	non album single
2011	"Walking in Unison"	non album single
2019	"Medievil Wall"	All in Good Time
2025	"Shapes and Forms"	non album single

== Awards and nominations ==
=== AIR Awards ===
The Australian Independent Record Awards (commonly known informally as AIR Awards) is an annual awards night to recognise, promote and celebrate the success of Australia's Independent Music sector.

Year	Nominee / work	Award	Result
2008	Primary Colours	Best Independent Hard Rock/Punk Album	Won
2010	Eddy Current Suppression Ring	Best Independent Artist	Nominated
2010	Rush to Relax	Best Independent Album	Nominated

=== ARIA Music Awards ===
The ARIA Music Awards is an annual awards ceremony held by the Australian Recording Industry Association.

Year	Nominee / work	Award	Result
2008	Primary Colours	Best Rock Album	Nominated
2010	Rush to Relax	Best Rock Album	Nominated
2010	Rush to Relax	Best Independent Release	Nominated

=== Australian Music Prize ===
The Australian Music Prize (the AMP) is an annual award of $30,000 given to an Australian band or solo artist in recognition of the merit of an album released during the year of award. They commenced in 2005.

Year	Nominee / work	Award	Result
2008	Primary Colours	Australian Music Prize	Won
2010	Rush to Relax	Australian Music Prize	Nominated

=== J Awards ===
The J Awards are an annual series of Australian music awards that were established by the Australian Broadcasting Corporation's youth-focused radio station Triple J. They commenced in 2005.

Year	Nominee / work	Award	Result
2008	Primary Colours	Australian Album of the Year	Nominated
2026	Eddy Current Suppression Ring	Double J Artist of the Year	Nominated

=== Music Victoria Awards ===
The Music Victoria Awards are an annual awards night celebrating Victorian music. They commenced in 2006.

Year	Nominee / work	Award	Result	Ref.
2016	Eddy Current Suppression Ring	Best Live Band	Nominated	
