= Owl Eyes =

Australian singer (born 1991)

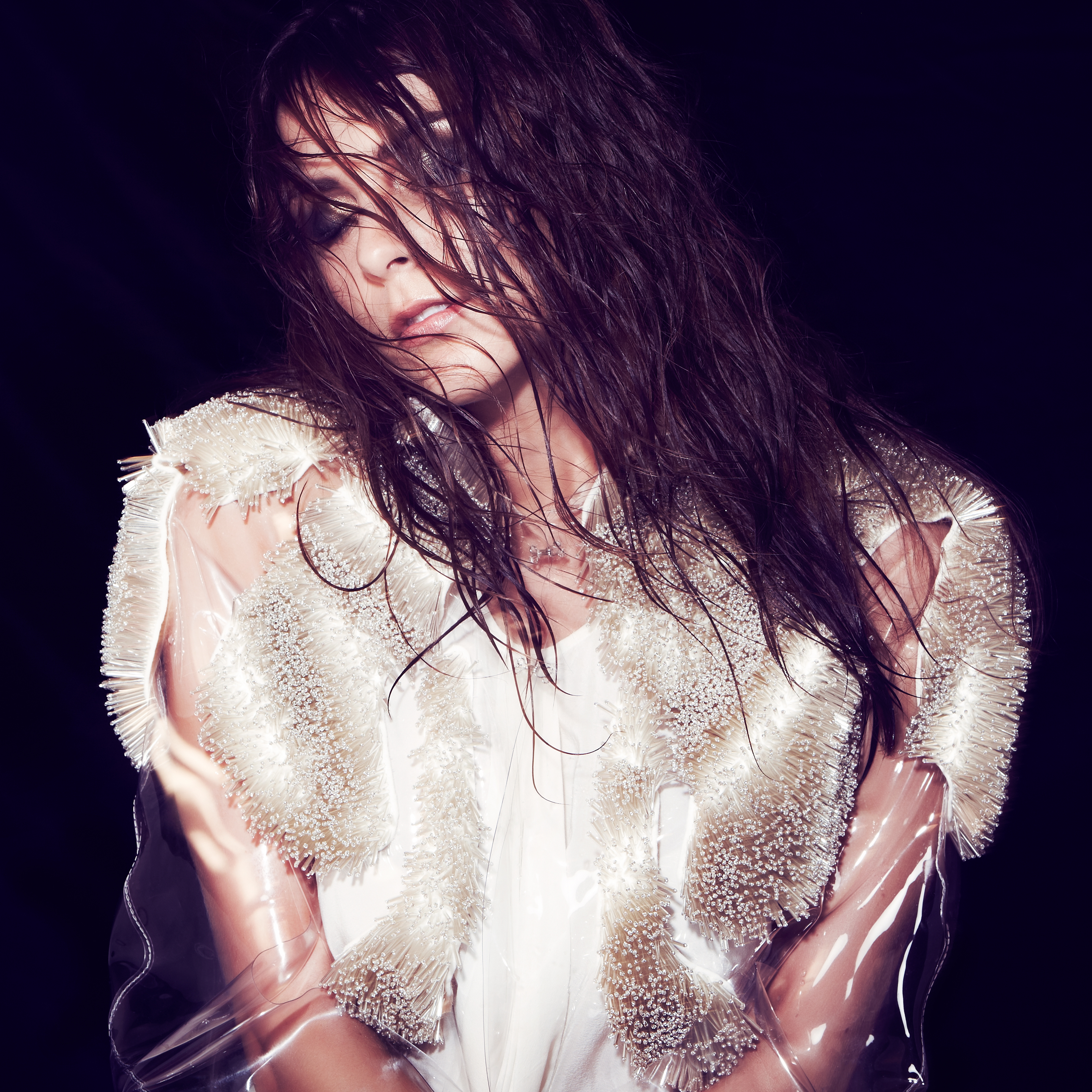

Background information
- Born: Brooke Addamo; 2 January 1991 (age 35)
- Origin: Melbourne, Australia
- Genres: Indie pop
- Years active: 2008–present
- Label: Illusive / Wunderkind
- Website: Owl Eyes on Facebook

Brooke Addamo (born 2 January 1991), better known by her stage name Owl Eyes, is an Australian recording artist from Melbourne signed to the Illusive / Wunderkind Label with distribution through Universal Music Group. She released her debut studio album Nightswim in April 2013, which peaked at number 28 on the ARIA Charts.

== Career ==
=== 2008: Australian Idol ===
In 2008, Addamo successfully auditioned for the 6th season of Australian Idol. She reached the finals and finished in 11th place.

=== 2009-2012: Faces, Raiders & Crystalised ===
In September 2010, Owl Eyes released her debut extended play Faces. She also featured on the Illy single "It Can Wait". The song was certified gold in Australia in 2011.

In May 2011, Owl Eyes released "Raiders", the lead single from her second extended play of the same name, which was released in July. In April 2012, Owl Eyes released "Crystalised", the lead single from her third extended play of the same name, which was released in May. In August 2012, Owl Eyes released the single "Love Run Dry", which was later included as a bonus track on her debut studio album Nightswim.

=== 2013-2016: Nightswim ===
In March 2013, Owl Eyes released "Closure", the lead single from her debut studio album Nightswim which released in April of 2013 and contains 12 songs. It debuted and peaked at number 28 on the Australian ARIA Charts. The album was co-produced by Jan Skubiszewski and Stylaz Fuego. A remix EP was released in October 2013, featuring eight tracks. Three further singles were released from the album and she toured in support of the album around Australia in 2013.

In 2015, she performed a number of tracks with Flight Facilities and the Melbourne Symphony Orchestra at a concert at the Sidney Myer Music Bowl. The performance was released in December 2015 as part of Flight Facilities' live album Live with the Melbourne Symphony Orchestra, which won the ARIA Award for Best Classical Album at the ARIA Music Awards of 2016.

=== 2018–present: Invisible Woman ===
In November 2018, Owl Eyes released her first new single in four years, "On Me".

In April 2020, Owl Eyes released the single "Tokyo." On 29 May 2020 she released her six track EP Invisible Woman.

== Discography ==
=== Studio albums ===
Title	Details	Peak chart positions
Title	Details	AUS
Nightswim	Released: April 2013; Label: Illusive Sounds / Wunderkind (ILL092CD); Formats: CD, digital download, streaming	28

=== Extended plays ===
Title	Details
Faces	Released: 10 September 2010; Label: Wunderkind (5249823122); Formats: CD, digital download, streaming
Raiders	Released: 1 July 2011; Label: Wunderkind (5249863492); Formats: CD, digital download, streaming
Crystalised	Released: 11 May 2012; Label: Illusive Sounds; Formats: CD, digital download, streaming
Nightmixes	Released: 22 October 2013; Label: Illusive Sounds / Wunderkind; Formats: CD, digital download, streaming
Invisible Woman	Released: 29 May 2020; Label: Self-released; Formats: Digital download, streaming

=== Singles ===
==== As lead artist ====
Title	Year	Peak chart positions	Album
Title	Year	BLR	Album
"1+1"	2010	*	Faces
"Faces"	2011	*	Faces
"Raiders"	2011	*	Raiders
"Crystalised"	2012	*	Crystalised
"Love Run Dry"	2012	*	Nightswim
"Closure"	2013	*	Nightswim
"Nightswim"	2013	*	Nightswim
"Hurricane"	2013	*	Nightswim
"On Me"	2018	*	Invisible Woman
"You and I / Le Soleil"	2019	*	Invisible Woman
"You Don't Know Love" (with Tapz)	2019	*	Invisible Woman
"Tokyo"	2020	*	Invisible Woman
"Trouble" (with Flight Facilities)	2024	20	TBA
"*" denotes the chart did not exist at that time.

==== As featured artist ====
List of singles released as featured artist
Title	Year	Peak chart positions	Certifications	Album
Title	Year	AUS	Certifications	Album
"It Can Wait" (Illy featuring Owl Eyes)	2010	58	ARIA: Gold	The Chase
"Heart Attack" (Flight Facilities featuring Owl Eyes)	2015	—		Down to Earth
"Sometimes" (Lo'99 featuring Owl Eyes)	2019	—		Non-album single

== Awards ==
=== AIR Awards ===
The Australian Independent Record Awards (commonly known informally as AIR Awards) is an annual awards night to recognise, promote and celebrate the success of Australia's Independent Music sector.

Year	Nominee / work	Award	Result
AIR Awards of 2011	"It Can Wait" (with Illy)	Best Independent Single/EP	Nominated
