= Youngbloods (The Amity Affliction song) =

2010 song by the Amity Affliction

"Youngbloods" is a song recorded by Australian post-hardcore band the Amity Affliction in 2010. It was included as the title and fifth track on their second studio album. A music video was released in July 2011.

== Illy version ==
"Youngbloods"

Single by Illy featuring Ahren Stringer

from the album Cinematic
- Released: 27 September 2013
- Length: 3:29
- Label: ADGM Limited
- Songwriters: Joel Birch; Ahren Stringer; Troy Brady, Ryan Burt; Mark Landon; Alasdair Murray
- Producer: M-Phazes

Illy singles chronology
"On & On" (2013)	"Youngbloods" (2013)	"Cinematic" (2013)

In 2013, "Youngbloods" was covered by Australian rapper Illy, featuring Ahren Stringer with additional lyrics added by Illy and Mark Landon. "Youngbloods" was released in September 2013 as the second single from Illy's fourth studio album, Cinematic. "Youngbloods" peaked at number 38 on the ARIA Charts.

"Youngbloods" was listed at 77 on the Triple J Hottest 100, 2013.

=== Charts ===
Chart (2013)	Peak position
Australia (ARIA)	38

=== Certifications ===
Certifications for "Youngbloods"
Region	Certification	Certified units/sales
Australia (ARIA)	Gold	35,000^{‡}
^{‡} Sales+streaming figures based on certification alone.
