= Papercuts (Illy song) =

Single by Illy featuring Vera Blue

from the album Two Degrees
- Released: 8 July 2016
- Recorded: 2016
- Genre: Hip hop
- Length: 4:15
- Label: ONETWO, Warner Music Australia
- Songwriters: Alasdair David George Murray, Mark Landon, Celia Pavey, Thomas Macken
- Producer: M-Phazes

Illy singles chronology
"Swear Jar" (2015)	"Papercuts" (2016)	"Catch 22" (2016)

Vera Blue singles chronology
"Settle" (2016)	"Papercuts" (2016)	"Fracture" (2017)

"Papercuts" is a song by Australian rapper Illy, which features Australian female folk/indie-pop vocalist Vera Blue and was produced by M-Phazes. The song was released on 8 July 2016 and peaked within the top 10 on the Australian ARIA Chart. The song is the lead single from Illy's fifth studio album, Two Degrees. "Papercuts" appears on the album as the sixth track.

Upon release, Illy said, "I've been holding on to 'Papercuts' for a while, and I'm really excited that it's finally coming out. It's a different vibe to anything I've done before."

== Track listing ==
Digital download
No.	Title	Length
1.	"Papercuts"	4:15

== Commercial performance ==
"Papercuts" debuted at number thirty-seven on the Australian ARIA singles chart, jumping to number eight then two in the following weeks, becoming both artists' highest-charting single to date.

== Charts ==
=== Weekly charts ===
Chart (2016)	Peak position
Australia (ARIA)	2
Australia Urban (ARIA)	1
Belgium (Ultratip Bubbling Under Flanders)	46
New Zealand Heatseekers (Recorded Music NZ)	3

=== Year-end charts ===
Chart (2016)	Position
Australia (ARIA)	24
Australia Urban (ARIA)	2

== Certifications ==
Region	Certification	Certified units/sales
Australia (ARIA)	8× Platinum	560,000^{‡}
New Zealand (RMNZ)	Gold	15,000^{‡}
^{‡} Sales+streaming figures based on certification alone.
