= Good Life (Illy album) =

Studio album by Illy
- Released: 15 November 2024
- Length: 43:23
- Label: Illy; Warner Australia
- Producer: Badrapper; Cam Bluff; Xavier Dunn; Dave Hammer; Konstantin Kersting; Kuren; Johnny Took

Illy chronology
The Space Between (2021)	Good Life (2024)

Singles from Good Life
- 1. "Stubborn" Released: 19 July 2024; 2. "Good Life" Released: 13 September 2024; 3. "Kids" Released: 15 November 2024

Good Life is the seventh studio album by Australian rapper Illy, released on 15 November 2024 through Warner Music Australia. During the week of release, the album was promoted with album release "pop ups" in Sydney, Melbourne, and Brisbane.

Upon announcement of the album, Illy said "The saying 'the good life' paints a picture of easy streets, white picket fences, and blue skies. The real 'good life’' is in belief – knowing who you are, taking your lumps and hard times, pushing forward, proving people (sometimes yourself) wrong, and seeing it through." Illy added "The last few years have battered me, I can't lie. But Australia has given me a lot, and this is a love song to Australia, Australian hip-hop and rock and roll and the deeply Australian 'never say die' spirit that got me through."

== Release ==
The album was announced on 12 September 2024 and scheduled for release on 24 October 2024. On 22 October 2024, Illy posted a note via instagram, saying the album has been delayed and would be released on 15 November 2024.

A deluxe edition was released on 28 March 2025, with four new tracks.

== Track listing ==
Good Life track listing
No.	Title	Writer(s)	Producer(s)	Length
1.	"Good Life"	Al Murray; Cam Bluff; Johnny Took	Bluff; Took	4:09
2.	"You Don't Like Me"	Murray; Joshua Anderson	Badrapper	2:17
3.	"You Lying"	Murray; Bluff	Bluff	3:00
4.	"Stubborn"	Murray	Bluff	3:23
5.	"Doing It Right"	Murray; Murray; Xavier Dunn; Ned Houston; Guy Sebastian	Dunn	2:21
6.	"Kids" (featuring Sofia Reyes)	Murray; Dunn; Toni Watson	Dunn	2:51
7.	"Good Night, Good Luck"	Murray; Konstantin Kersting	Kersting	2:24
8.	"Rings"	Murray	Kuren; Dunn^{[a]}	2:58
9.	"Closer" (featuring Hevenshe)	Murray; Dunn	Dunn; Kuren^{[a]}	2:58
10.	"Satellites"	Murray; Dave Hammer	Hammer	2:41
11.	"Throwbacks"	Murray; James Angus	Dunn	3:02
12.	"Whatever You Wanted"	Murray; Charles Stephens III; Jeremy Thurber; Sadie Rose Van	Dunn	3:00
13.	"Braveheart"	Murray; Dunn	Dunn	4:00
14.	"Get Up Get Down" (featuring Jungleboi)	Murray; Dunn	Dunn	3:49
Total length:				43:23

Good Life (Deluxe) track listing
No.	Title	Length
15.	"Hopeless" (featuring Indiana Massara)	3:21
16.	"Free Hand"	3:03
17.	"Kids" (acoustic)	2:51
18.	"Good Life" (acoustic)	4:41

Note

- ^{^[a]} signifies an additional producer

== Personnel ==
- Illy – vocals
- Erik Madrid – mixing
- Chris Gehringer – mastering

== Charts ==
Chart performance for Good Life
Chart (2024)	Peak position
Australian Albums (ARIA)	4
Australian Hip Hop/R&B Albums (ARIA)	2
