= Exit Sign (song) =

Single by Hilltop Hoods featuring Illy and Ecca Vandal

from the album The Great Expanse
- Released: 22 February 2019
- Length: 3:43
- Label: Hilltop Hoods; Universal Music Australia
- Songwriters: Alasdair Murray; Andrew Burford; Barry Francis; Daniel Smith; Matt Lambert; Sarah Aarons
- Producer: One Above

Hilltop Hoods singles chronology
"Leave Me Lonely" (2019)	"Exit Sign" (2019)	"I'm Good" (2020)

Illy singles chronology
"Bright Dawn" (2017)	"Exit Sign" (2019)	"Then What" (2019)

Ecca Vandal singles chronology
"Place of Dreams" (2018)	"Exit Sign" (2019)	"In My Mind" (2019)

"Exit Sign" is a song by Australian hip hop group Hilltop Hoods, released on 22 February 2019 as the third and final single from their eighth studio album The Great Expanse (2019). The song features Illy and Ecca Vandal.

At the ARIA Music Awards of 2019, "Exit Sign" was nominated for Best Video.

At the APRA Music Awards of 2020, "Exit Sign" was nominated for Most Performed Urban Work of the Year.

== Track listings ==
7-inch vinyl
No.	Title	Writer(s)	Producer(s)	Length
1.	"Exit Sign" (single version)	Alasdair Murray; Andrew Burford; Barry Francis; Daniel Smith; Matt Lambert; Sarah Aarons	One Above	3:43
2.	"Exit Sign" (instrumental)			3:43
Total length:				7:26

The Great Expanse album release – digital download / streaming
No.	Title	Writer(s)	Producer(s)	Length
6.	"Exit Sign"	Murray; Burford; Francis; Smith; Lambert; Aarons	One Above	3:43

== Charts ==
=== Weekly charts ===
Chart (2019)	Peak position
Australia (ARIA)	16

=== Year-end charts ===
2019 year-end chart performance for "Exit Sign"
Chart (2019)	Position
Australia (ARIA)	57
Australian Artist (ARIA)	10

2020 year-end chart performance for "Exit Sign"
Chart (2020)	Position
Australian Artist (ARIA)	15

== Certifications ==
Region	Certification	Certified units/sales
Australia (ARIA)	6× Platinum	420,000^{‡}
New Zealand (RMNZ)	Platinum	30,000^{‡}
^{‡} Sales+streaming figures based on certification alone.
