= Tightrope (Illy song) =

Single by Illy featuring Scarlett Stevens

from the album Cinematic
- Released: 21 March 2014
- Recorded: 2013
- Genre: Hip hop
- Length: 4:53 (Album version); 3:37 (Single version)
- Songwriters: Mark Landon, Alasdair Murray
- Producer: M-Phazes

Illy singles chronology
"Cinematic" (2013)	"Tightrope" (2014)	"One for the City" (2014)

"Tightrope" is a song by Australian rapper, Illy. Written by Mark Landon and Alasdair Murray and produced by the former under his stage name, M-Phazes the song was first released in March 2014 through Illy's record label, ONETWO as the fourth single from Illy's fourth studio album, Cinematic (2013).

"Tightrope" was well received by fans and was also singled out as one of the strongest tracks on Cinematic in Navarone Farrell's review of the album for The AU Review.

== Background and release ==
Whilst recording material for his fourth studio album, Cinematic (2013), Illy collaborated with a variety of artists including the Hilltop Hoods, Daniel Merriweather and Ahren Stringer of The Amity Afflcition among others. When asked about the album's material Illy responded, "It’s the most ambitious work I’ve done and these are the biggest risks I’ve taken, but I believe they’re the strongest songs I’ve written".

"Tightrope" was eventually released as the follow-up to the album's third single, "Youngbloods" in March 2014. While the album version of the song features guest vocals by Kristina Miltiadou the single version features vocals by Scarlett Stevens. The album version was released to radio and also used in the song's accompanying music video. When speaking about the single, Illy commented, "Tightrope has been going off on the tour. It’s good to have a single that can also be a track that goes down really well in a live performance".

== Music video ==
The song's accompanying music video runs for approximately three minutes and thirty-seven seconds. The video centres on Illy who is seen rowing a boat across a lake. As he continues to do so however, he is followed and subsequently shot at by a woman, causing his boat to sink and sending him into the water.

== Track listing ==
Digital download

No.	Title	Length
1.	"Tightrope"	3:37

== Chart performance ==
"Tightrope" debuted at number thirty-nine on the Australian ARIA singles chart and after re-entering the chart twice, eventually reached its peak position of number eighteen during its ninth week on the chart, thereby becoming Illy's first top twenty hit and one of his top hits to date. The song was certified Platinum by the Australian Recording Industry Association (ARIA), denoting shipments in excess of 70,000 copies.

== Charts ==
Chart (2014)	Peak position
Australia (ARIA)	18
Australian Urban (ARIA)	3
Australian Artist Singles Chart (ARIA)	6
Australian Digital Tracks Chart (ARIA)	19

=== Year-end chart ===
Chart (2014)	Position
Australia (ARIA)	69

== Certifications ==
Region	Certification	Certified units/sales
Australia (ARIA)	5× Platinum	350,000^{‡}
^{‡} Sales+streaming figures based on certification alone.
