= Heard It All =

Single by Illy

from the album Bring It Back
- Released: May 2012
- Length: 4:15
- Label: Obese Records
- Songwriter(s): Alasdair Murray, Andrew Burford
- Producer(s): One Above

Illy singles chronology
"Cigarettes" (2011)	"Heard It All" (2012)	"Where Ya Been" (2012)

"Heard It All" is a song by Australian rapper Illy and was released in May 2012 as the lead single from Illy's third studio album, Bring It Back. "Heard It All" peaked at number 48 on the ARIA Charts; Illy's first top 50 charting single. "Heard It All" was certified gold in Australia in 2015.

== Reception ==
Beat Magazine said Illy's "Heard It All" had won him over with "cunning reverse psychology" saying "I don't know how to process hip hop with genuine humility in it."

== Charts ==
Chart (2012)	Peak position
Australia (ARIA)	48

== Certifications ==
Region	Certification	Certified units/sales
Australia (ARIA)	Gold	35,000^{^}
^{^} Shipments figures based on certification alone.
