= Position Correction =

Studio album by TZU
- Released: 19 February 2004
- Genre: Hip hop
- Length: 51:15
- Label: Liberation Music
- Producer: TZU

TZU chronology
Position Correction (2004)	Smiling at Strangers (2005)

Singles from Position Correction
- 1. "Dam Busters" Released: 2003; 2. "The Horse You Rode in On" Released: 2003; 3. "Wildstylee" Released: 2004

Position Correction is the debut album by Australian hip-hop band TZU, released in 2004. The album was the first of theirs to be released through Liberation Music.

== Track listing ==
1. "Who?" - 3:56
2. "Summer Days" - 3:53
3. "Position Correction" - 3:57
4. "Good Dog" - 4:23
5. "Dam Busters" - 2:32
6. "Wild Stylee feat. Mark Pearl" - 4:15
7. "Curse of the Word" - 4:21
8. "The Horse You Rode in On" - 3:35
9. "Back Up!" - 3:57
10. "Bold Digger" - 5:55
11. "The Travel Song" - 10:32
