= Bring It Back (Illy album) =

Studio album by Illy
- Released: 21 September 2012
- Genre: Hip hop
- Length: 45:58
- Label: Obese

Illy chronology
The Chase (2010)	Bring It Back (2012)	Cinematic (2013)

Singles from Two Degrees
- 1. "Heard It All" Released: 22 May 2012; 2. "Where Ya Been" Released: 16 July 2012

Bring It Back is the third studio album by Illy. The album was released in September 2012 and debuted at number 15 on the ARIA Charts.

== Track listing ==
1. "Bring It Back" - 4:25
2. "All the Above" (featuring Thundamentals) - 3:50
3. "Where Ya Been" (featuring Pez) - 3:17
4. "Back, Back, Forward" - 3:53
5. "The Real" (featuring Mantra & The Grey Ghost) - 3:25
6. "Where Is My Mind, Pt. 2" - 3:28
7. "Check It Out" - 3:45
8. "Say It to Me" - 3:28
9. "The Bridge" (featuring Reason & Elemont) - 4:33
10. "Heard It All" - 3:42
11. "Coming Home" - 3:45
12. "6 Shooter" (featuring Purpose, J. Stark, Bitter Belief, Raven & Prime) - 4:27

== Charts ==
Chart (2012)	Peak position
Australian Albums (ARIA)	15
