= Cinematic (Illy album) =

Studio album by Illy
- Released: 8 November 2013
- Recorded: 2013
- Genre: Hip hop
- Length: 53:52
- Label: ONETWO
- Producers: M-Phazes (exec.), Cam Bluff, Styalz Fuego

Illy chronology
Bring It Back (2012)	Cinematic (2013)	Two Degrees (2016)

Singles from Cinematic
- 1. "On & On" Released: 21 June 2013; 2. "Youngbloods" Released: 27 September 2013; 3. "Cinematic" Released: 31 October 2013; 4. "Tightrope" Released: 21 March 2014

Cinematic is the fourth studio album by Australian rapper Illy, first released in November 2013 through ONETWO records.

Recorded at M-Phazes' studio in Melbourne, Australia, the album serves as Illy's first release under his independent label, ONETWO and includes collaborations with Hilltop Hoods, Drapht, Daniel Merriweather and Kira Puru among others. During one particular interview, Illy commented on the album by saying, “This will be my fourth album in five years; I've learned a lot and directed this experience into Cinematic. The concepts are tighter, the hooks are more finessed and the beats are off the chart!”

Cinematic was a critical and commercial success upon release, garnering positive reviews from most critics and debuting and peaking at number-four on the Australian ARIA Albums Chart, thus becoming Illy's first top five album and his highest charting studio release to date. The album was certified gold by the Australian Recording Industry Association for shipments exceeding 35,000 copies. In October 2014, Cinematic received an ARIA Award nomination in the "Best Urban Album" category. However, it lost to the Hilltop Hoods' Walking Under Stars.

Cinematic was preceded by the singles, "On & On", "Youngbloods" and "Cinematic", with the second single debuting and peaking at number thirty-eight on the Australian ARIA Singles Chart, thereby becoming Illy's first top forty hit. The album's fourth single, "Tightrope" meanwhile, became Illy's most successful release (album or single) to date, peaking at number eighteen on the Australian ARIA Singles Chart and attaining a platinum certification.

The album was re-released on 21 November 2014 under the title Cinematic: Uncut, including six new tracks.

== Track listing ==
Cinematic
No.	Title	Writer(s)	Producer(s)	Length
1.	"Opening Night"	Mark Landon, Alasdair Murray	M-Phazes	4:08
2.	"One for the City" (featuring Thomas Jules)	Landon, Murray	M-Phazes	4:12
3.	"Youngbloods" (featuring Ahren Stringer)	Landon, Murray, Joel Birch, Ahren Stringer, Troy Brady, Ryan Burt	M-Phazes	3:29
4.	"On & On"	Murray, Jan Skubiszewski	M-Phazes	3:06
5.	"Coming Down" (featuring Hilltop Hoods)	Murray, Daniel Smith, Matt Lambert, Cam Ludik	Cam Bluff	5:08
6.	"No Tomorrow"	Landon, Murray	M-Phazes	3:36
7.	"Tightrope"	Landon, Murray	M-Phazes	4:52
8.	"Talk" (featuring Kira Puru)	Landon, Murray, Kira Puru, Saraya Beric	M-Phazes	4:36
9.	"Save Me" (featuring Daniel Merriweather)	Murray, Dennis Dowlut, Kaelyn Behr	Styalz Fuego	3:58
10.	"YoYo" (featuring Drapht)	Landon, Murray, Paul Ridge	M-Phazes	3:49
11.	"Am Yours"	Landon, Murray	M-Phazes	3:15
12.	"Cinematic"	Landon, Murray	M-Phazes	4:33
13.	"More Than Gold"	Landon, Murray, Ridge	M-Phazes	5:10

Cinematic: Uncut — (bonus tracks)
No.	Title	Length
14.	"Haters Wanna Copy" (featuring Spit Syndicate)	5:05
15.	"12345" (Way of the Eagle featuring Illy)	3:25
16.	"Miss You Til"	4:38
17.	"Ausmusic Medley"	5:10
18.	"On a Star"	5:11
19.	"Am Yours" (Strings Mix)	3:17

== Promotion ==
Aside from the album's singles, Illy also embarked on his 5-date Cinematic tour in March 2014 to promote the album.

=== Cinematic Tour dates ===
Date	City	Venue
Australia
7 March 2014	Melbourne	The Hi-Fi
14 March 2014	Sydney	The Metro
15 March 2014	Brisbane	The Zoo
20 March 2014	Adelaide	The Gov
21 March 2014	Perth	The Capitol

== Critical reception ==
Cinematic was generally well received by contemporary music critics. In his review for themusic.com.au, Ben Preece awarded the album four stars and stated, "Illy pulls off his lead role effortlessly, guiding the entire project with the style and class we’ve come to expect from the MC, but seemingly with a new zest that breathes fresh air into what he does". Triple J also gave the album a positive review commenting, "Working with a host of high profile producers such as M-Phazes (Eminem, Bliss N Eso, Kimbra), Illy has pushed outside his musical boundaries, delivering a record that transcends genres and is packed with glitchy pop hooks, soul and epic beats, not to mention Illy’s trademark cutting edge lyrics". However, Navarone Farrell of the Au Review was not as impressed, giving the album a mixed review and an overall rating of 6.6/10. While he praised some of the album's lyrical content, he felt that much of the album's lyrics were "lost in the over-production found on Cinematic". Ultimately, however Farrell concludes that "Cinematic is sure to be a hit with Illy fans and a fresh batch of tweens looking for an easy way onto the hip-hop/rap bandwagon".

== Awards and nominations ==
Cinematic was nominated for "Best Urban Album" at the 2014 ARIA Music Awards but lost to Walking Under Stars by the Hilltop Hoods.

Year	Award	Nomination	Result
2014	ARIA Music Awards	Best Urban Album for Cinematic	Nominated

== Charts ==
=== Weekly charts ===
Chart (2014)	Peak position
Australian Albums (ARIA)	4

=== Year-end charts ===
Chart (2013)	Position
Australian Artist Albums Chart	33
Chart (2014)	Position
Australian Albums Chart	89

== Certifications ==
Region	Certification	Certified units/sales
Australia (ARIA)	Gold	35,000^{^}
^{^} Shipments figures based on certification alone.
