= Computer Love (album) =

Studio album by TZU
- Released: 28 June 2008
- Recorded: TZU Studios
- Genre: Australian hip hop
- Length: 60:49
- Label: Liberation Music
- Producer: TZU

TZU chronology
| Snarling at Strangers (2006) | Computer Love (2008) | Cover Up Motel (2009) |

Singles from Computer Love
- 1. "Computer Love" Released: 2008; 2. "Mondays" Released: 2009

Professional ratings
Review scores
| Source | Rating |
|---|---|
| Triple J | (favourable) |

Computer Love is the third studio album by Australian group TZU. The album was released on 28 June 2008 and debuted at no. 23 on the ARIA Charts.

At the J Awards of 2008, the album was nominated for Australian Album of the Year.

The lead single, "Computer Love" received airplay on national youth radio station Triple J. The video clip was nominated for the "Music Video" J Award for 2008.

== Track listing ==
1. "We Got The Feeling" – 3:53
2. "Computer Love" – 3:50
3. "Right of Way" – 4:02
4. "Take It Easy" – 3:39
5. "Number One" – 3:54
6. "Axis Tilt" – 3:24
7. "Got To Do" – 3:58
8. "Get Up" – 3:47
9. "Mondays" – 4:33
10. "Step with the Pressure" – 3:32
11. "All Fall Down" – 4:12
12. "Burning Up" – 4:59
13. "Myriam's Song" – 4:47
14. "Crazy Thinker" – 4:34
15. "Reflecting Off That" – 3:55

== Charts ==
| Chart (2008) | Peak position |
|---|---|
| Australian Albums (ARIA) | 23 |
