= Catch 22 (song) =

Single by Illy featuring Anne-Marie

from the album Two Degrees
- Released: 10 October 2016
- Recorded: 2016
- Length: 3:41
- Label: Warner Bros. Australia
- Songwriters: Alasdair Murray; Grant Michaels; Mark Landon; Suzanne Shinn
- Producers: M-Phazes; WNDRBRD; Shinn

Illy singles chronology
"Papercuts" (2016)	"Catch 22" (2016)	"You Say When" (2017)

Anne-Marie singles chronology
"Alarm" (2016)	"Catch 22" (2016)	"Rockabye" (2016)

"Catch 22" is a song by Australian rapper Illy featuring English singer Anne-Marie. The song was released on 10 October 2016, alongside the announcement of his forthcoming fifth studio album, Two Degrees.

Anne-Marie spoke to Matt and Alex on Triple J, saying: "I listened to some of his music and I really like that he kept through an Australian accent through rapping… I like him thought it would be a good idea."

The Mark Alston directed music video was nominated for Best Video at the ARIA Music Awards of 2017.

At the APRA Music Awards of 2018 the song won Urban Work of the Year.

== Music video ==
The "Catch 22" video was released on 6 November 2016. It is set in a previously dead video game arcade where a group of friends find a game called Catch 22, allowing them to test their fate.

== Track listing ==
Digital download
No.	Title	Length
1.	"Catch 22" (featuring Anne-Marie)	3:41

== Commercial performance ==
"Catch 22" debuted at number eighteen on the Australian ARIA singles chart.

== Charts ==
=== Weekly charts ===
Chart (2016)	Peak position
Australia (ARIA)	11
Australia Urban (ARIA)	3

=== Year-end charts ===
Chart (2016)	Position
Australia (ARIA)	99
Australia Urban (ARIA)	10

== Certifications ==
Region	Certification	Certified units/sales
Australia (ARIA)	3× Platinum	210,000^{‡}
^{‡} Sales+streaming figures based on certification alone.
