= Curse ov Dialect =

Australian musical group

Curse Ov Dialect
- Origin: Melbourne
- Genre: Alternative hip hop
- Years active: 1994–present
- Labels: Mush Records, Staubgold, Valve (Aus), Mistletone (Aus), Poetic Dissent, Curse Music
- Members: Raceless; Volk Makedonski; Atarungi; Paso Bionic
- Past members: 2 August; Malice
- Website: curseovdialect.bandcamp.com

Curse Ov Dialect is an alternative hip hop group based in Melbourne. It consists of Raceless, Volk Makedonski, Atarungi, and Paso Bionic. They are the first Australian hip-hop group to be signed to an American record label.

== Musical career ==
The group formed in 1994 with the original lineup consisting of MC Raceless, MC Malice and DJ Paso Bionic on turntables. This lineup recorded their demo cassette Evil Klownz (1995) and Hex Ov Intellect (1998). Not long after the release of Hex Ov Intellect, they met Ollie Olsen (Max Q, No) who went on to produce their self-titled EP Curse Ov Dialect (2000). Malice left the group during the recording of Curse Ov Dialect and was replaced by Atarangi, 2 August and Volk Makedonski. With this lineup, they grew in popularity due to their wild live shows and strong anti-racist, anti-homophobic and internationalist message at a time of rising xenophobia in Australian politics and society.

After shows supporting Anticon (Doseone, Sole, and Jel) in 2001, they landed a record deal with Mush Records which released Lost in the Real Sky in 2003. The album was mixed by Paso Bionic and mastered by Simon Polinski. Upon release, it was awarded 'Album of the Week' on 3RRR and 3PBS. Sebastian Chan says that "whilst [the album] radiates strong psychedelic surrealism, at the core, there are strong anti-racist, multiculturalist themes – which give the record a very specific Australian-ness. Likewise, the beats are drawn from literally everywhere – Arabic, mediaeval English, and of course traditional Macedonian." Anthony Carew in The Age wrote "from acknowledging racist states, to attacking such prejudice, to dreaming of some utopian global community in which 'all cultures come together', the album, unlike so many rap records, finds the lyricists talking about not just themselves, but the world at large." Brian Ho at Dusted Magazine described it as "a wonderfully imagined album that successfully borrows and reinterprets sounds from all facets of music and culture, creatively but still with enough energy and bounce for frequent neck exercise."

Curse Ov Dialect followed with Wooden Tongues in 2006. Mixed by Cornel Wilczek and mastered by François Tétaz, their second effort for Mush Records received equally positive praise. Brian Turner of WFMU described the album as having "flowing rhymes and scratches [that] complement Muslimgauze-ish beats, baroque horns, kid choruses and operatic flights, Bollywood cooing, Balkan horn blasts all presented in sharp precision appropriate to the assorted lyrics (which focus, needless to say, on worldly diversity/cultural unity). It's admirable that all this can be presented with total energy and cohesiveness while *still* acknowledging all that is right about hip-hop history". Beat Magazine noted that "the biggest shock is that the second half plays with shade and texture, revealing subtlety to be one of their strengths, possibly the only thing not sampled on their debut."

Their next album Crisis Tales was mixed by Danielsan and mastered by François Tétaz. The album was released in Australia by Mistletone and internationally via Staubgold in 2009. The song "85 percent" received high rotation on Triple J. Dan Rule in Music Australia Guide found that "while as untethered as ever, new record Crisis Tales is also Curse's most concise. Even with jaunts into previously unexplored terrains... there's an unswerving quality to the production that harnesses each of Crisis Tales' disparate strands." Shaun Prescott in Mess+Noise wrote "Crisis Tales is a maximal cluster fuck of references, lectures, wordplay and contorted surrealism. It's a result of a hip-hop generation tanked with input and ever greedy for more, eager to be overloaded by disparate textures and unorthodox style/aesthetic/philosophical cohabitation." Ron Hart in Pop Matters noted that "some may not have much interest in issues such as Aboriginal rights or the rampant political corruption of Curse Ov Dialect's home continent, Crisis Tales nevertheless commands attention, thanks to the uncanny mic skills of MCs Raceless and Volk Makedonski and their unique back-and-forth with vocalists August the 2nd and Atarungi."

== Live performances ==
The group are renowned for their intense live performances involving elaborate costumes, audience participation and Dadaist stage theatrics. Sebastian Chan in Cyclic Defrost writes that "their early shows had more in common in terms of theatrics with Throbbing Gristle than anything hip hop" while Joe Tangari in Pitchfork Media describes their performance as "like the Village People gone to the dark side, with a caped, masked weirdo and a staff-wielding Maltese duke flanking the stage and two guys in the middle dressed respectively like a South Asian prince and a mental hospital patient with severe head trauma." Early performances involved stage diving, twisted impersonations, nudism, throwing food at the audience and shows spilling out of the venue and onto the street. At the 2002 Big Day Out Festival, they played a notorious improvised collaboration with experimental supergroup Testicle Candy (Oren Ambarchi, Robbie Avenaim, Lucas Abela, Ray Ahn, and Martin Ng) and Dave Grohl (Nirvana, Foo Fighters) on drums where Grohl was struck on the head with a watermelon but continued to play. In 2003, their live performance was featured in the Melbourne episode of Lonely Planet Six Degrees.

They have toured the world playing in Europe (2004, 2007, 2009 and 2010 and 2019), the United States (2004), Japan (2009, 2010), and various music and arts festivals including Big Day Out (1999–2004), Laneway Festival (2007), Livid (2003), What is Music? (2000–2003), This Is Not Art (2001, 2003), Liverpool Biennial (2004), Incubate (2007), and Fusion Festival (2010, 2019).

Amongst others, they have supported Slippy Mane, Public Enemy, Future Islands, Peaches, Yamataka Eye, Kool Keith, Blackalicious, Chicks on Speed, Anticon, Buck 65, Busdriver, Saul Williams, Edan, Atmosphere, Kid 606, Severed Heads, Florian Hecker, V/Vm, and Cobra Killer.

== Discography ==
=== Albums ===
- Evil Clownz (Curse Music, 1995)
- Hex Ov Intellect (Curse Music, 1998)
- Curse Ov Dialect (Curse Music, 2001)
- Lost in the Real Sky (Mush Records/Valve, 2003)
- Wooden Tongues (Mush Records/Valve 2006)
- Curse Ov the Kaigen (Poetic Dissent, 2007)
- Crisis Tales (Staubgold 2009)
- Twisted Strangers (Monotype/Valve 2016)
- Dark Days Bright Nights (Heavy Machinery Records/Valve 2021)

=== Guest appearances ===
- Architecture in Helsinki – "Love is Evil" from Do the Whirlwind EP (2004)
- Debmaster – "Universal Bigot" from Monster Zoo (2006)

=== Music videos ===
- "Bionic Progress" – Directed by Kenneth Cheong (2000)
- "Baby How" – Directed by Tara Pattendon (2004)
- "Upside Down Frowns" – Directed by Lucas Abela (2004)
- "Bury Me Slowly" – Directed by Antuong Nguyen (2006)
- "Twisted Strangers (feat. Hemlock Ernst)" – Directed by Antuong Nguyen (2015)
