= Long Story Short (Illy album) =

Studio album by Illy
- Released: 15 April 2009
- Genre: Hip hop
- Length: 58:00
- Label: Obese
- Producer: M-Phazes, J-Skub, Jsquared, Ta-Ku

Illy chronology
Long Story Short (2009)	The Chase (2010)

Singles from Long Story Short
- 1. "Pictures" Released: May 2009; 2. "Generation Y" Released: 25 August 2009

Professional ratings
Review scores
Source	Rating
The Mercury	3.5/5 stars

Long Story Short is the debut studio album by Illy. The album was released on 15 April 2009. It includes collaborations with Phrase, N'Fa, Pegz and Spit Syndicate. The bulk of the album was produced by M-Phazes and J-Skub. Both the singles, "Pictures" and "Generation Y" were placed on Triple J national rotation.

== Track listing ==
1. "Generation Y"
2. "Black Cap Rap" (feat. Pegz)
3. "Full Tank"
4. "My Way"
5. "Rock Star Shit"
6. "Pictures"
7. "This Or That"
8. "Our Country"
9. "Red Light Green Light" (feat. Spit Syndicate, Solo And Cisco Tavares)
10. "Brother"
11. "For You" (feat. Phrase and N'Fa)
12. "Dumb It Down"
13. "Long Story Short" (feat. Cisco Tavares)
14. "All Around the World" (feat. Kulaia)

== Production ==
- M-Phazes - Tracks 1, 2, 5, 9, 10, 11, 14
- J-Skub - Tracks 3, 6, 7, 8
- Jsquared - Tracks 4, 13
- Ta-Ku - Track 12
