= The Chase (Illy album) =

Studio album by Illy
- Released: 29 October 2010
- Genre: Hip hop
- Length: 56:53
- Label: Obese
- Producer: M-Phazes, Jan Skubiszewski, Taku, Styalz Fuego, J Squared

Illy chronology
Long Story Short (2009)	The Chase (2010)	Bring It Back (2013)

Singles from The Chase
- 1. "The Chase" Released: March 2010; 2. "It Can Wait" Released: 24 October 2010; 3. "Cigarettes" Released: July 2011

Professional ratings
Review scores
Source	Rating
The Mercury	4/5 stars

The Chase is the second studio album by Illy. The album was released in October 2010 with an online countdown track by track. It includes collaborations with Owl Eyes, Hue Blanes, Wren, Oliver Daysoul and Joyride. The bulk of the album was once again produced by M-Phazes. Three singles were released from the album, "The Chase", "It Can Wait" and "Cigarettes". "It Can Wait" was listed at #29 on the Triple J Hottest 100, 2010.

== Track listing ==
1. "Go"
2. "Guess I Could"
3. "It Can Wait" (featuring Owl Eyes)
4. "On the Bus"
5. "Cigarettes" (featuring Hue Blanes)
6. "Without a Doubt"
7. "We Don't Care"
8. "Numbers Game"
9. "Feel Something"
10. "Put Em in the Air"
11. "Diamonds" (featuring Wren)
12. "The Chase" (featuring Olivier Daysoul)
13. "I Know" (featuring Joyride)
14. "Same Number, Same Hood"

== Charts ==
Chart (2010)	Peak position
Australian Albums (ARIA)	25
