= Two Degrees =

Studio album by Illy
- Released: 11 November 2016
- Genre: Hip hop
- Length: 46:41
- Label: ONETWO/Warner

Illy chronology
Cinematic (2013)	Two Degrees (2016)	The Space Between (2021)

Singles from Two Degrees
- 1. "Papercuts" Released: 8 July 2016; 2. "Catch 22" Released: 10 October 2016; 3. "You Say When" Released: February 2017; 4. "Oh My" Released: 12 May 2017

Two Degrees is the fifth studio album by Illy. The album was released on 11 November 2016 and debuted at number 1 on the ARIA Albums Chart. It extended the record for most number-one albums in a calendar year by Australian artists in becoming the nineteenth such album. Singles by Illy from Two Degrees are "Papercuts" featuring Vera Blue (July 2016), 8 September 2017 "Catch 22" featuring Anne-Marie (October) and "Oh My" (May 2017) featuring Jenna McDougall.

== Track listing ==
ONETWO003

1. "Forget It" - 4:23
2. "If Looks Could Kill" - 3:54
3. "Hazard to Myself" (featuring Sir the Baptist) - 3:13
4. "Oh My" (featuring Jenna McDougall) - 3:30
5. "Papercuts" (featuring Vera Blue) - 4:15
6. "Lightshow" - 3:51
7. "Two Degrees" - 4:30
8. "Catch 22" (featuring Anne-Marie) - 3:41
9. "Extra Extra" (featuring Mike Waters) - 3:08
10. "You Say When" (featuring Marko Penn) - 3:49
11. "Truce" - 4:15
12. "Highway" - 4:12

== Personnel ==
- Illy (Alasdair David George Murray) – rapping
- Sir the Baptist – (track 3)
- Mikey Chan – guitar (track 4)
- Jenna McDougall – vocals (track 4)
- Vera Blue – vocals (track 5)
- Anne-Marie – vocals (track 8)
- Mike Waters – vocals (track 9)
- Marco Penn – vocals (track 10)

== Charts ==
=== Weekly charts ===
Chart (2016)	Peak position
Australian Albums (ARIA)	1

=== Year-end charts ===
Chart (2016)	Position
Australian Artist Albums (ARIA)	32
