= Illy (rapper) =

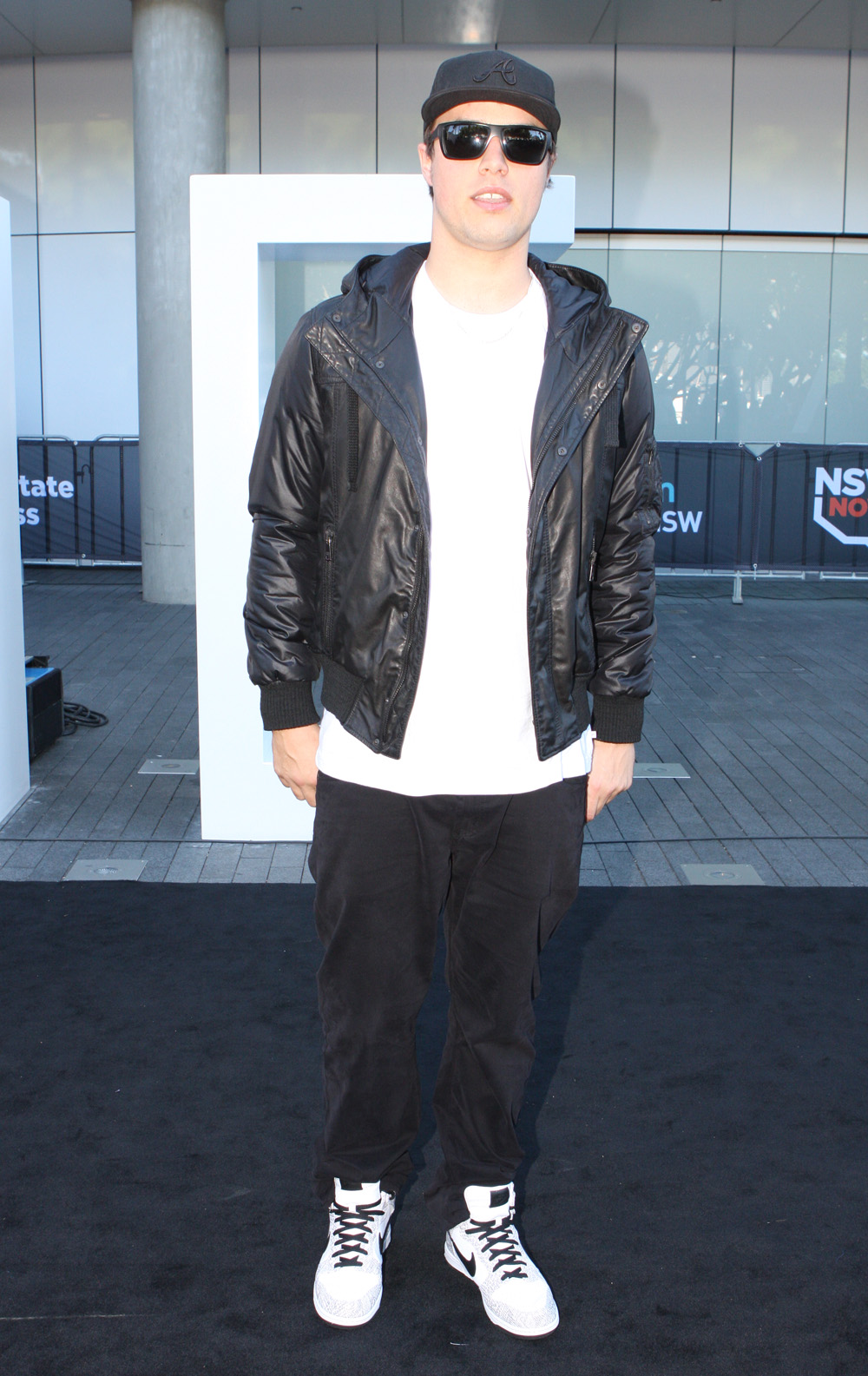
- Illy at the ARIA Music Awards of 2013

Background information
- Born: Alasdair David George Murray; 6 September 1985 (age 41); Frankston, Victoria, Australia
- Genres: Hip hop, Australian hip hop
- Occupations: Rapper, singer, songwriter
- Years active: 2009–present
- Labels: ONETWO; UNFD; Warner; Sony Music Australia; Sony
- Website: illyal.com

Alasdair David George Murray (born 6 September 1985), professionally known as Illy, is an Australian rapper from Frankston, Victoria. Illy first emerged onto the hip hop scene in 2009. He has released five studio albums and has won multiple ARIA Music Awards. Illy has performed at many Australian music festivals including headline spots at Groovin' the Moo, Splendour in the Grass, Spilt Milk and Yours and Owls.

== Early life ==
Alasdair David George Murray was born on 6 September 1985 in Frankston, Melbourne, Australia.

== Career ==
=== 2009–2011: Long Story Short and The Chase ===
Before his solo career, Illy was a member of Crooked Eye, but opted to leave the group.

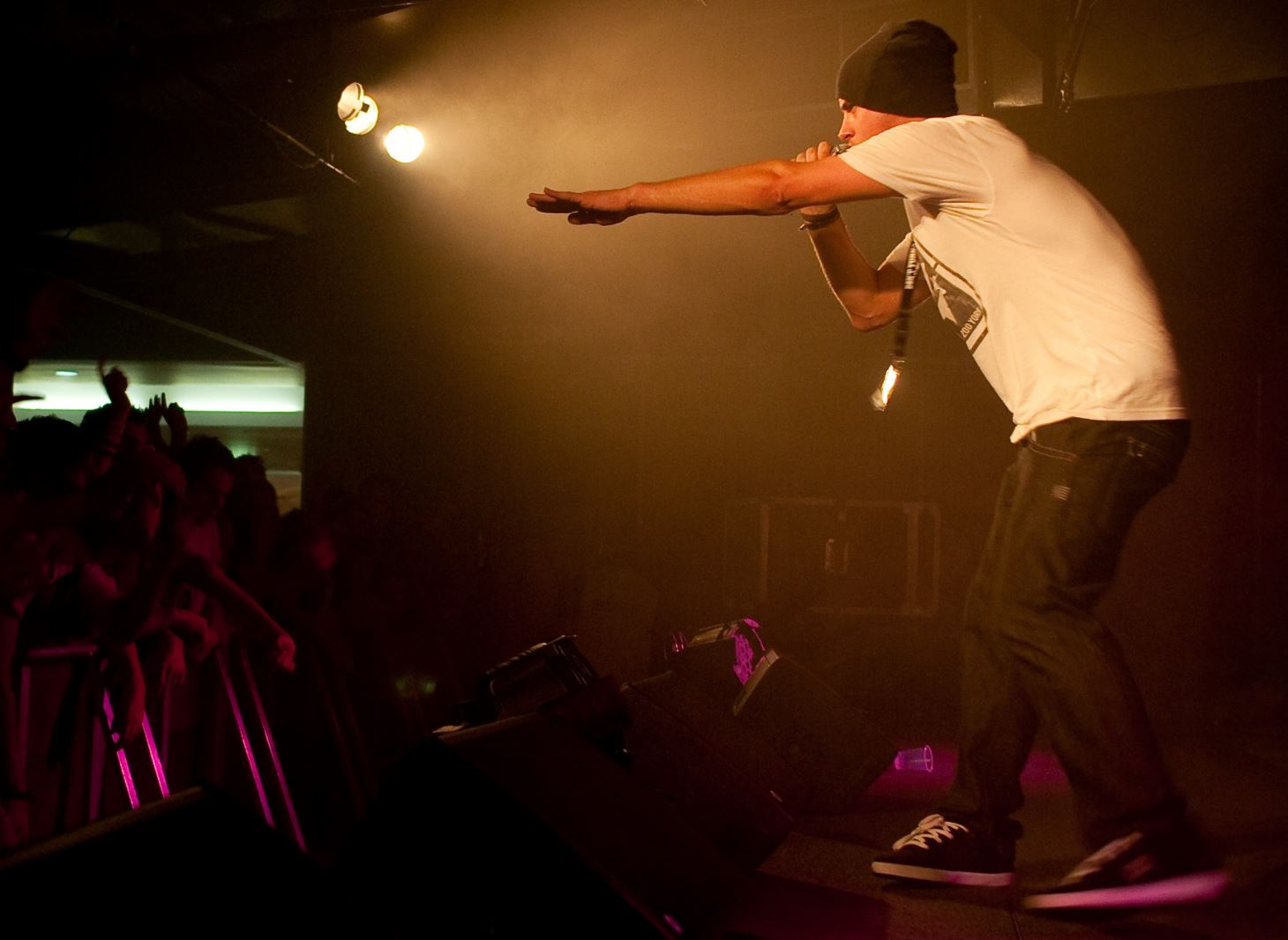
Illy performing at the University of Tasmania in 2011

Illy released his first album, Long Story Short in 2009. Long Story Short reached No. 24 on the ARIA Top 40 Urban Albums chart and the lead single, "Pictures", was placed on national rotation on Triple J. In April 2010, Illy embarked on his first national headlining tour, playing 12 dates nationally. In September the same year, Illy toured nationally alongside Australian rappers 360 and Skryptcha for "The Three Up Tour". Illy featured on the track "Take It from Me" on producer M-Phazes' 2010 debut album Good Gracious.

In 2010, Illy released the singles "The Chase" and "Cigarettes" and in October 2010, released his second studio album The Chase. The Chase peaked at number 25 on the ARIA Charts. The album's third single, "It Can Wait" became Illy's first charting single on the Australian Singles Chart, peaking at number fifty-eight. In February 2011, Illy embarked on his 14-date nationwide "The Chase Tour", with special guest M-Phazes. In October 2011, "It Can Wait" was certified Gold by ARIA after selling 35,000 copies. At the ARIA Music Awards of 2011 The Chase was nominated for the ARIA Award for Best Urban Album.

=== 2012–2015: Bring It Back and Cinematic ===
In May 2012, Illy released "Heard It All", the lead single from his third studio album. In September 2012, Illy released his third album, Bring It Back, which peaked at number 15 on the ARIA Charts. Illy described the album as a "passion project" and a "tribute" to the Australian hip hop scene. A 24-date nationwide tour supported the release, with Australian hip-hop producer Chasm and Skryptcha as support acts.

At the ARIA Music Awards of 2013, Bring It Back won Illy his first ARIA Music Award, winning ARIA Award for Best Urban Album. In September 2013, Illy left Obese Records to set up his own label, ONETWO records, and signed South Australian hip hop artist Allday.

In November 2013, Illy released his fourth studio album, Cinematic. The album debuted at number 4 on the ARIA Charts. In March 2014, the album's fourth single "Tightrope" became Illy's first top 20 single, peaking at number 18.

=== 2016–2021: Two Degrees and The Space Between ===
In July 2016, Illy released "Papercuts", featuring Vera Blue, which peaked at number 2 on the ARIA charts. At the ARIA Music Awards of 2016, the song was nominated for four awards. In October 2016, Illy released "Catch 22" featuring Anne-Marie, which peaked at number 11 on the ARIA charts. In November 2016, Illy released his fifth studio album, Two Degrees which debuted at No. 1 on the ARIA charts. At the ARIA Music Awards of 2017, the album was nominated for three awards. "You Say When" and "Oh My" were released as singles in 2017. Illy toured the album and won ARIA Award for Best Australian Live Act at the ARIA Music Awards of 2017.

On 24 May 2019, Illy released "Then What"; his first new release in two years. Singles "Codes" and "Lean on Me" followed in 2019. On 13 February 2020, Illy released "Last Laugh"

On 22 May 2020, Australian radio station Triple J premiered a new song by Illy titled "Parmas In June", created as part of a COVID-19 self-isolation musical challenge nicknamed Quarantune.

The Space Between was released in 2021.

=== 2022–present: Return to Warner and Good Life ===
In October 2022, Illy re-signed with Warner Music and released "Like You". This was followed in October 2023 by "Hopeless", and his seventh studio album, Good Life, in November 2024.

In November 2026, Illy independently released "Back to Work".

== Discography ==
- Long Story Short (2009)
- The Chase (2010)
- Bring It Back (2012)
- Cinematic (2013)
- Two Degrees (2016)
- The Space Between (2021)
- Good Life (2024)

== Awards ==
=== AIR Awards ===
The Australian Independent Record Awards (commonly known informally as AIR Awards) is an annual awards night to recognise, promote and celebrate the success of Australia's independent music sector.

Year	Nominee / work	Award	Result
2011	"It Can Wait"	Best Independent Single/EP	Nominated
2011	The Chase	Best Independent Hip Hop/Urban Album	Nominated
2013	Bring it Back	Best Independent Hip Hop/Urban Album	Nominated

=== APRA Awards ===
The Australasian Performing Right Association Awards of 2017 (generally known as APRA Awards) are an annual awards ceremony to award outstanding achievements in contemporary songwriting, composing and publishing. Illy has won three awards from eight nominations.

Year	Nominee / work	Award	Result
2014	"On and On"	Urban Work of the Year	Nominated
2014	"Youngbloods"	Urban Work of the Year	Nominated
2015	"Tightrope" (featuring Scarlett Stevens)	Urban Work of the Year	Won
2017	"Papercuts" (featuring Vera Blue)	Urban Work of the Year	Won
2018	"Catch 22" (featuring Anne-Marie)	Urban Work of the Year	Won
2018	"Oh My" (featuring Jenna McDougall)	Urban Work of the Year	Nominated
2020	"Exit Sign" (Hilltop Hoods featuring Illy and Ecca Vandal)	Most Performed Urban Work of the Year	Nominated
2020	"Then What"	Most Performed Urban Work of the Year	Nominated

=== ARIA Awards ===
The ARIA Music Awards is an annual awards ceremony that recognises excellence, innovation, and achievement across all genres of Australian music. They commenced in 1987. Illy has won two trophies from nineteen nominations.

Year	Nominee / work	Award	Result	Ref.
2011	The Chase	Best Urban Album	Nominated	
2013	Bring it Back	Best Urban Album	Won	
2014	Cinematic	Best Urban Album	Nominated	
2016	"Papercuts"	Best Male Artist	Nominated	
2016	"Papercuts"	Best Pop Release	Nominated	
2016	"Papercuts"	Song of the Year	Nominated	
2016	"Papercuts"	Best Video	Nominated	
2016	"Papercuts"	Engineer of the Year	Nominated	
2016	"Papercuts"	Producer of the Year	Nominated	
2017	Two Degrees	Album of the Year	Nominated	
2017	Two Degrees	Best Male Artist	Nominated	
2017	Two Degrees	Best Urban Album	Nominated	
2017	"Catch 22" (featuring Anne-Marie) (directed by Mark Alston)	Best Video	Nominated	
2017	"Catch 22" (featuring Anne-Marie)	Song of the Year	Nominated	
2017	The Two Degrees Tour	Best Australian Live Act	Won	
2019	Then What	Best Hip Hop Release	Nominated	
2019	"Exit Sign"(with Hilltop Hoods and Ecca Vandal)	Best Video	Nominated	
2020	"Last Laugh"	Hip Hop Release	Nominated	
2020	"Exit Sign"(with Hilltop Hoods and Ecca Vandal)	Song of the Year	Nominated	
2021	M-Phazes for The Space Between	Producer of the Year	Nominated	

=== J Awards ===
The J Awards are an annual series of Australian music awards that were established by the Australian Broadcasting Corporation's youth-focused radio station Triple J. They commenced in 2005.

Year	Nominee / work	Award	Result
2014	"One for the City"	Australian Video of the Year	Nominated

=== MTV Europe Music Awards ===
The MTV Europe Music Awards is an award presented by Viacom International Media Networks to honour artists and music in pop culture.

Year	Nominee / work	Award	Result
2017	himself	Best Australian Act	Nominated
