= Bernard Fanning discography =

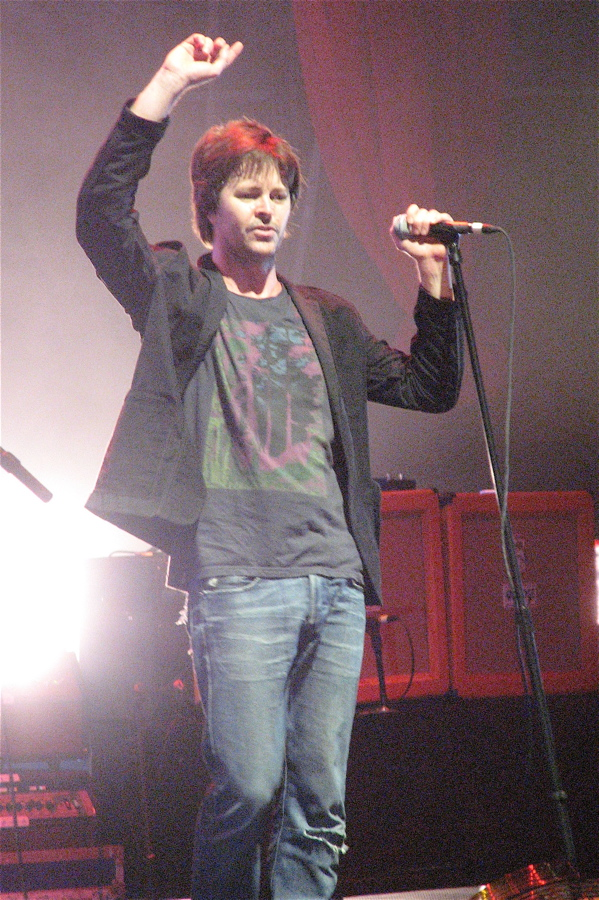
- Bernard Fanning performing with Powderfinger on the Across the Great Divide tour in 2007
- Studio albums: 4
- Singles: 11

The discography of Bernard Fanning, an Australian singer-songwriter consists of four studio albums, and eleven singles.

== Studio albums ==
Title	Album details	Peak chart positions		Certifications (sales threshold)
Title	Album details	AUS	NZ	Certifications (sales threshold)
Tea & Sympathy	Release date: 31 October 2005; Label: Dew Process/Lost Highway; Formats: CD, download, LP	1	11	ARIA: 6× Platinum
Departures	Release date: 7 June 2013; Label: Dew Process/Universal Music Australia; Formats: CD, download	1	35	ARIA: Gold
Civil Dusk	Release date: 5 August 2016; Label: Dew Process/Universal Music Australia; Formats: CD, download	2	— (Note: Civil Dusk did not enter the NZ Top 40 Albums Chart, but peaked at number 5 on the NZ Heatseekers Albums Chart.)	
Brutal Dawn	Release date: 26 May 2017; Label: Dew Process/Universal Music Australia; Formats: CD, download	2	—	
"—" denotes releases that did not chart

== Singles ==
Title	Year	Peak chart positions		Certifications	Album
Title	Year	AUS	NZ	Certifications	Album
"Wish You Well"	— (Note: "Wish You Well" was not released physically in Australia so could not enter the ARIA top 100 at a time when its rules required a single to have a physical release in order to chart, but peaked at number 21 on the ARIA Digital Track Chart.)	2005	24	ARIA: 8× Platinum	Tea & Sympathy
"Songbird"	— (Note: "Songbird" was not released physically in Australia so could not enter the ARIA top 100 at a time when its rules required a single to have a physical release in order to chart, but peaked at number 30 on the ARIA Digital Track Chart.)	2005	—	ARIA: 4× Platinum	Tea & Sympathy
"Watch Over Me"	2006	16	—	ARIA: Platinum	Tea & Sympathy
"Weekend of Mystery"	2006	—	—		Tea & Sympathy
"Battleships"	2013	—	—		Departures
"Bittersweet" (with Kasey Chambers)	2014	—	—		Bittersweet
"Wasting Time"	2016	—	—		Civil Dusk
"Reckless"	2016	—	—		Civil Dusk
"Better Be Home Soon/Fall at Your Feet/Distant Sun (Medley)" (with Missy Higgins and Crowded House)	2016	53	—		Non-album single
"Isn't It a Pity"	2017	—	—		Brutal Dawn
"Wish You Well" (Baker Boy featuring Bernard Fanning)	2022	—	—		Non-album single
"—" denotes releases that did not chart

== Guest appearances ==
Title	Year	Artist	Album	
Title	"Led"	2013	with Pete Murray	Blue Sky Blue "The Byron Sessions"
"You and I"	with Depedro	2013	La Increible Historia de un Hombre Bueno	
"Lover's Shoes"	with Darren Middleton	2013	Translations	
"I'm Still On Your Side"	2014	with Jimmy Barnes	30:30 Hindsight	
"I Hope I Never"	2021	various artists	True Colours, New Colours: The Songs of Split Enz	
