= 2016 ARIA Music Awards =

Annual Australian music awards

- Date: 23 November 2016
- Venue: Star Event Centre, Sydney, New South Wales
- Hosted by: The Veronicas

Highlights
- Most wins: Flume (8)
- Most nominations: Flume (11)
- Website: ariaawards.com.au

Television/radio coverage
- Network: Network Ten

The 30th Annual Australian Recording Industry Association Music Awards (generally known as the ARIA Music Awards or simply the ARIAs) are a series of award ceremonies which include the 2016 ARIA Artisan Awards, ARIA Hall of Fame Awards, ARIA Fine Arts Awards and the ARIA Awards. The ceremony took place on 23 November at the Star Event Centre and aired on Network Ten. Flume won the most awards, with eight from eleven nominations.

The broadcast rated 586,000 viewers up from 461,000 in 2015. Crowded House were inducted into the ARIA Hall of Fame.

== Performers ==
- Bernard Fanning
- Crowded House
- Flume, Kai and Tove Lo
- Illy and Vera Blue
- Jimmy Barnes and Jessica Mauboy
- John Farnham
- Missy Higgins
- The Veronicas
- Troye Sivan
- Violent Soho

== ARIA Hall of Fame inductee ==
On 5 September, it was announced that Crowded House were to be inducted into the ARIA Hall of Fame.

== Nominees and winners ==
=== ARIA Awards ===
Winners are listed first and highlighted in boldface; other final nominees are listed alphabetically by artists' first name.

Album of the Year	Best Group
**Flume – Skin (Future Classic)**; RÜFÜS – Bloom (Sweat It Out/Sony Music); Sia – This Is Acting (Monkey Puzzle/Inertia); The Avalanches – Wildflower (Modular/EMI); Troye Sivan – Blue Neighbourhood (EMI)	**Violent Soho – Waco (I OH YOU)**; King Gizzard & the Lizard Wizard – Nonagon Infinity (Flightless Records/Remote Control Records); RÜFÜS – Bloom (Sweat It Out/Sony Music); The Avalanches – Wildflower (Modular/EMI); The Veronicas – "In My Blood" (Sony Music)
Best Male Artist	Best Female Artist
**Flume – Skin (Future Classic)**; Bernard Fanning – Civil Dusk (Dew Process/Universal Music); Guy Sebastian – "Black & Blue" (Sony Music); Illy – "Papercuts" (featuring Vera Blue) (Warner Music Australia); Troye Sivan – Blue Neighbourhood (EMI)	**Sia – This Is Acting (Monkey Puzzle/Inertia)**; Delta Goodrem – Wings of the Wild (Sony Music); Jessica Mauboy – "This Ain't Love" (Sony Music); Montaigne – Glorious Heights (Wonderlick Recording Company); Sarah Blasko – Eternal Return (EMI)
Best Adult Alternative Album	Best Adult Contemporary Album
**Sarah Blasko – Eternal Return (EMI)**; Jarryd James – Thirty One (Dryden Street Limited/Universal Music); Matt Corby – Telluric (Mercury Australia/Universal Music); Peter Garrett – A Version of Now (Sony Music); The Temper Trap – Thick as Thieves (Liberation Music)	**Bernard Fanning – Civil Dusk (Dew Process/Universal Music)**; Bob Evans – Car Boot Sale (EMI); Paul Kelly – Seven Sonnets & a Song (Gawd Aggie Recordings/Universal Music); Robert Forster – Songs to Play (EMI); Tina Arena – Eleven (EMI)
Best Hard Rock/Heavy Metal Album	Best Rock Album
**King Gizzard & the Lizard Wizard – Nonagon Infinity (Flightless Records/Remote Control Records)**; Hellions – Opera Oblivia (UNFD); Parkway Drive – Ire (Resist/Cooking Vinyl Australia); The Amity Affliction – This Could Be Heartbreak (Roadrunner Records); Twelve Foot Ninja – Outlier (Volkanik/MGM)	**Violent Soho – Waco (I OH YOU)**; Ball Park Music – Every Night the Same Dream (Stop Start Music); Boy & Bear – Limit of Love (Boy & Bear/Universal Music); Gang of Youths – Let Me Be Clear (Mosy Recordings/Sony Music); The Living End – Shift (Dew Process/Universal Music)
Best Blues & Roots Album	Best Country Album
**Russell Morris – Red Dirt Red Heart (Chugg Music/MGM)**; Jimmy Barnes – Soul Searchin' (Liberation Music); Kev Carmody – Recollections... Reflections... (A Journey) (One Louder Recordings/Universal Music); The Cat Empire – Rising with the Sun (Two Shoe Records); The Wilson Pickers – You Can't Catch Fish from a Train (ABC Music/UMA)	**Sara Storer – Silos (ABC Music/Universal Music)**; Adam Brand and the Outlaws – Adam Brand and the Outlaws (ABC Music/Universal Music); Bill Chambers – Cold Trail (Checked Label Services); Fanny Lumsden – Small Town Big Shot (Social Family Records/Universal Music); The Wolfe Brothers – This Crazy Life (ABC Music/Universal Music)
Best Pop Release	Best Dance Release
**Flume – "Never Be like You" (featuring Kai) (Future Classic)**; Illy – "Papercuts" (featuring Vera Blue) (Warner Music Australia); Sia – This Is Acting (Monkey Puzzle/Inertia); The Veronicas – "In My Blood" (Sony Music); Troye Sivan – Blue Neighbourhood (EMI)	**Flume – Skin (Future Classic)**; Hayden James – "Just a Lover" (Future Classic); L D R U – "Keeping Score" (featuring Paige IV) (Audio Paxx Agency/Sony Music); RÜFÜS – Bloom (Sweat It Out/Sony Music); The Avalanches – Wildflower (Modular/EMI)
Best Urban Album	Best Children's Album
**Drapht – Seven Mirrors (The Ayems/Sony Music)**; Citizen Kay – With the People (ASP/MGM); Koi Child – Koi Child (Pilerats Records); L-FRESH the Lion – Become (Elefant Traks/Inertia); Urthboy – The Past Beats Inside Me Like a Second Heartbeat (Elefant Traks/Inertia)	**The Wiggles – Wiggle Town! (ABC Music/Universal Music)**; Justine Clarke – Pyjama Jam! (ABC Music/Universal Music); Pat Davern – Alexander the Elephant in Zanzibar (ABC Music/Universal Music); Play School – Famous Friends: Celebrating 50 Years of Play School (ABC Music/Universal Music); Sam Moran – Play Along with Sam: BEST. DAY. EVER! (6 Degrees Records/MGM)
Breakthrough Artist	Best Independent Release
**Montaigne – Glorious Heights (Wonderlick Recording Company)**; DMA's – Hills End (I OH YOU); L D R U – "Keeping Score" (featuring Paige IV) (Audio Paxx Agency/Sony Music); Olympia – Self Talk (EMI); Safia – "Make Them Wheels Roll" (Warner Music Australia/Parlophone)	**Flume – Skin (Future Classic)**; Jarryd James – Thirty One (Dryden Street Limited/Universal Music); King Gizzard & the Lizard Wizard – Nonagon Infinity (Flightless Records/Remote Control Records); Sia – This Is Acting (Monkey Puzzle/Inertia); Violent Soho – Waco (I OH YOU)

=== Public voted ===
Song of the Year	Best Video
**Troye Sivan – "Youth" (EMI)**; Flume – "Never Be like You" (featuring Kai) (Future Classic); Hilltop Hoods – "1955" (featuring Montaigne & Thom Thum) (Golden Era Records/Universal Music Australia); Illy – "Papercuts" (featuring Vera Blue) (Warner Music Australia); Kungs vs. Cookin' on 3 Burners – "This Girl" (UNI/UMA); Keith Urban – "The Fighter" (featuring Carrie Underwood) (Capital/EMI); L D R U – "Keeping Score" (featuring Paige IV) (Audio Paxx Agency/Sony Music); Marcus Marr & Chet Faker – "The Trouble with Us" (Detail Records); Sia – "Cheap Thrills" (Monkey Puzzle/Inertia); The Veronicas – "In My Blood" (Sony Music)	**Made in Katana for Troye Sivan – "Youth" Acoustic (Sydney Session) (EMI)**; Anthony Rose for Delta Goodrem – "Dear Life" (Sony Music); Clemens Habicht for Flume – "Never Be like You" (featuring Kai) (Future Classic); Dan Graetz for Violent Soho – "Like Soda" (I OH YOU); Danny Cohen & Jason Galea for King Gizzard & the Lizard Wizard – "People-Vultures" (Flightless Records/Remote Control Records); Dean Bates for Illy – "Papercuts" (featuring Vera Blue) (Warner Music Australia); Matt Sharp for Guy Sebastian – "Black & Blue" (Sony Music); Richard Coburn for Hilltop Hoods – "1955" (featuring Montaigne & Thom Thum) (Golden Era Records/Universal Music Australia); Sia & Daniel Askill for Sia – "Cheap Thrills" (Monkey Puzzle/Inertia); Sunny Leunig for Courtney Barnett – "Elevator Operator" (Milk!/Remote Control)
Best Australian Live Act	Best International Artist
**Hilltop Hoods – The Restrung Tour (Golden Era Records/Universal Music Australia)**; Courtney Barnett – National Theatre Tour (Milk!/Remote Control); Flume – St. Jerome's Laneway Festival (Future Classic); Gang of Youths – Gang of Youths National Tour (Mosy Recordings/Sony Music); King Gizzard & the Lizard Wizard – Nonagon Infinity Tour (Flightless Records/Remote Control Records); RÜFÜS – Bloom Tour (Sweat It Out/Sony Music); Tame Impala – Australian Tour (Modular/Universal Music); The Living End – Shift Tour (Dew Process/Universal Music); Violent Soho – The Waco Tour (I OH YOU); You Am I – Bargain Bin Bon Vivants Tour (The You Am I Set/Inertia)	**One Direction – Made in the A.M. and Four (SYCO/Sony Music Entertainment)**; Adele – 25 (XL/Inertia); Beyoncé – Lemonade (Columbia/Sony Music Entertainment); Coldplay – A Head Full of Dreams (PLG); Drake – Views and If You're Reading This It's Too Late (Universal/Universal Music Australia); Meghan Trainor – Title and Thank You (Sony Music Entertainment); Justin Bieber – Purpose (DEF/Universal Music Australia); Taylor Swift – 1989 (BIG/Universal Music Australia); Twenty One Pilots – Blurryface (Atlantic/Warner); The Weeknd – Beauty Behind the Madness (Universal/Universal Music Australia)

=== Fine Arts Awards ===
Winners are listed first and highlighted in boldface; other final nominees are listed alphabetically by artists' first name.

Best Classical Album
- **Flight Facilities – Live with the Melbourne Symphony Orchestra (Future Classic)**
  - Joe Chindamo & Zoë Black – The New Goldberg Variations (AlFi Records/Planet)
  - Katie Noonan & Brodsky Quartet – With Love and Fury (Kin Music/Universal Music)
  - Nicole Car – The Kiss (ABC Classics/Universal Music)
  - Richard Tognetti & Australian Chamber Orchestra – Mozart's Last Symphonies (ABC Classics/Universal Music)
Best Jazz Album
- **Vince Jones & Paul Grabowsky – Provanance (ABC Jazz/Universal Music)**
  - Don Burrows & James Morrison – In Good Company (ABC Jazz/Universal Music)
  - Emma Pask – Cosita Divina (Independent/Emma Pask Music)
  - Stu Hunter – The Migration (The Habitat Productions)
  - The Idea of North – Ballads (ABC Jazz/Universal Music)
Best Original Soundtrack/Cast/Show Album
- **Josh Pyke & the Sydney Symphony Orchestra – Live at the Sydney Opera House (ABC Music/Universal Music)**
  - Kate Miller-Heidke – The Rabbits (Original Live Cast Recording) (ABC Classics/Universal Music Australia)
  - Queensland Symphony Orchestra – Gallipoli Symphony (ABC Classics/Universal Music Australia)
  - Various Artists – The Divorce (Original Cast Recording) (Universal Music Australia)
  - Various Artists – Velvet (Original Cast Recording) (Social Family Records/Universal Music Australia)
Best World Music Album
- **Melbourne Ska Orchestra – Sierra Kilo Alpha (FOUR FOUR/Universal Music)**
  - Gawurra – Ratja Yaliyali (CAAMA Music/Rocket)
  - Joseph Tawadros – World Music (Independent/Planet)
  - Paul Grabowsky/Monash Art Ensemble/Daniel Ngukurr Boy Wilfred/David Yipininy Wilfred – Nyilipidgi (ABC Jazz/Universal Music)
  - Seaman Dan – An Old Man of the Sea (Hot Records)
Best Comedy Release
- **Roy & HG – This Sporting Life (ABC Music/Universal Music)**
  - Kate Miller-Heidke – "I'm Growing a Beard Downstairs for Christmas" (featuring The Beards) (Cooking Vinyl Australia)
  - Luke Heggie - You're Not Special/Anythink is Possible (Century Entertainment)
  - Matt & Alex – Play It Out (ABC Music/Universal Music)

=== Artisan Awards ===
Winners are listed first and highlighted in boldface; other final nominees are listed alphabetically by artists' first name.

Producer of the Year
- **Harley Streten for Flume – Skin (Future Classic)**
  - M-Phazes for Illy – "Papercuts" (featuring Vera Blue) (Warner Music Australia)
  - Tony Buchen for Montaigne – Glorious Heights (Wonderlick Recording Company)
  - Robbie Chater and Tony Di Blasi for The Avalanches – Wildflower (Modular/EMI)
  - Alex Hope for Troye Sivan – Blue Neighbourhood (EMI)
Engineer of the Year
- **Eric J Dubowsky and Harley Streten for Flume – Skin (Future Classic)**
  - Nick DiDia for Bernard Fanning – Civil Dusk (Dew Process/Universal Music)
  - M-Phazes for Illy – "Papercuts" (featuring Vera Blue) (Warner Music Australia)
  - Tony Espie and Robbie Chater for The Avalanches – Wildflower (Modular/EMI)
  - Alex Hope for Troye Sivan – Blue Neighbourhood (EMI)
Best Cover Art
- **Jonathan Zawada for Flume – Skin (Future Classic)**
  - Karen Lynch for Bernard Fanning – Civil Dusk (Dew Process/Universal Music)
  - Kristen Doyle for Delta Goodrem – Wings of the Wild (Sony Music Australia)
  - Jack Vanzet for RÜFÜS – Bloom (Sweat It Out/Sony Music Australia)
  - Robbie Chater for Lost Art for The Avalanches – Wildflower (Modular/EMI)
