= To Be Free =

To Be Free may refer to:

- To Be Free, Jackie DeShannon album
- "To Be Free" (Mike Oldfield song), a single by musician Mike Oldfield, released in 2002. It is from the album Tres Lunas. The main vocalist is the Jazz singer Jude Sim
- "To Be Free" (Arashi song), a 2010 song recorded by Japanese boy band Arashi
- "To Be Free" (L D R U song), a 2017 song recorded by Australian group L D R U
- To Be Free (Alyosha song)
- "To Be Free" (Sam Smith song), a 2025 song by Sam Smith
- To Be Free, Princess Jasmines' solo song in Disney's Aladdin: A Musical Spectacular
- II B Free, a 1995 album by Louchie Lou & Michie One
- To Be Free (concert tour), concert tour by Sam Smith
