= Because I Love You (Montaigne song) =

Single by Montaigne

from the album Glorious Heights
- Released: 3 June 2016
- Length: 3:37
- Label: Wonderlick Entertainment, Sony Music Australia
- Songwriter(s): Jessica Cerro; Tony Buchen

Montaigne singles chronology
| "1955" (2016) | "Because I Love You" (2016) | "Feel That" (2017) |

"Because I Love You" is a song by Australian recording artist Montaigne. The song was released in June 2016 as the third and final single from Montaigne's debut studio album, Glorious Heights. The song peaked at number 98 on the ARIA Charts; becoming Montaigne's first charting album. The song was certified platinum in Australia in 2021.

Montaigne told The Music their motives for the song were "a look back at what you'd known to be a healthy and fulfilling relationship whilst experiencing it, but with a little perspective discovered was pretty bad. I wrote this song and only after writing it did I realize that that's how I felt the whole time." adding "It's a classic “love is blind” narrative. I love this song; it's probably the most fun thing I've ever written." It was featured in episode 8 of the first season of the Netflix show Heartstopper.

== Reception ==
In an album review, Dylan Marshall from the AU Review said "'Because I Love You' is just a straight up, pop gem... with its self-reflection on a failed relationship being the focal point of the track, it showcases the lengths people are willing to go to in an attempt to overlook problems one might face with their significant other."

== Track listing ==
- Digital download
1. "Because I Love You" – 3:37

== Charts ==
| Chart (2016) | Peak position |
|---|---|
| Australia (ARIA) | 98 |

== Certifications ==
| Region | Certification | Certified units/sales |
|---|---|---|
| Australia (ARIA) | Platinum | 70,000^{‡} |
^{‡} Sales+streaming figures based on certification alone.

== Release history ==
| Country | Date | Format | Label | Catalogue |
|---|---|---|---|---|
| Australia | 3 June 2016 | Digital download, streaming | Wonderlick Entertainment, Sony Music Australia | 1116924299 |
