= Keeping Score (L D R U song) =

Single by L D R U featuring Paige IV

from the album Sizzlar
- Released: 25 September 2015
- Length: 3:02
- Label: Audiopaxx
- Songwriters: Drew Carmody; Sarah Aarons
- Producer: Drew Carmody

L D R U singles chronology
| "Pop That" (2015) | "Keeping Score" (2015) | "Next to You" (2016) |

Music video
- "Keeping Score" on YouTube

"Keeping Score" is a song recorded by Australian record producer L D R U, featuring Paige IV and was released in September 2015 as the lead single from L D R U's debut studio album Sizzlar (2017).

In January 2016, the song was voted number 22 in the Triple J Hottest 100, 2015 and following this result, peaked at number 14 on the ARIA Singles Chart in February 2016. The song was certified double platinum in Australia in 2017.

At the ARIA Music Awards of 2016, the song was nominated for Best Dance Release, Breakthrough Artist and Song of the Year.

== Track listing ==
- Digital download
1. "Keeping Score" – 3:02
- Digital download
1. "Keeping Score" (Cut Snake remix)– 5:34
2. "Keeping Score" (Luca Lush remix)– 3:31
3. "Keeping Score" (Boxinbox & Lionsize remix)– 2:57
4. "Keeping Score" (The Meeting Tree remix)– 2:32
5. "Keeping Score" (Terace remix)– 5:18
6. "Keeping Score" (Oski remix)– 3:43

== Charts ==
=== Weekly charts ===
| Chart (2016) | Peak position |
|---|---|
| Australia (ARIA) | 14 |

=== Year-end charts ===
| Chart (2016) | Position |
|---|---|
| Australia (ARIA) | 85 |

== Certification ==
| Region | Certification | Certified units/sales |
|---|---|---|
| Australia (ARIA) | 2× Platinum | 140,000^{‡} |
^{‡} Sales+streaming figures based on certification alone.
