= Twelve Foot Ninja =

Australian metal band

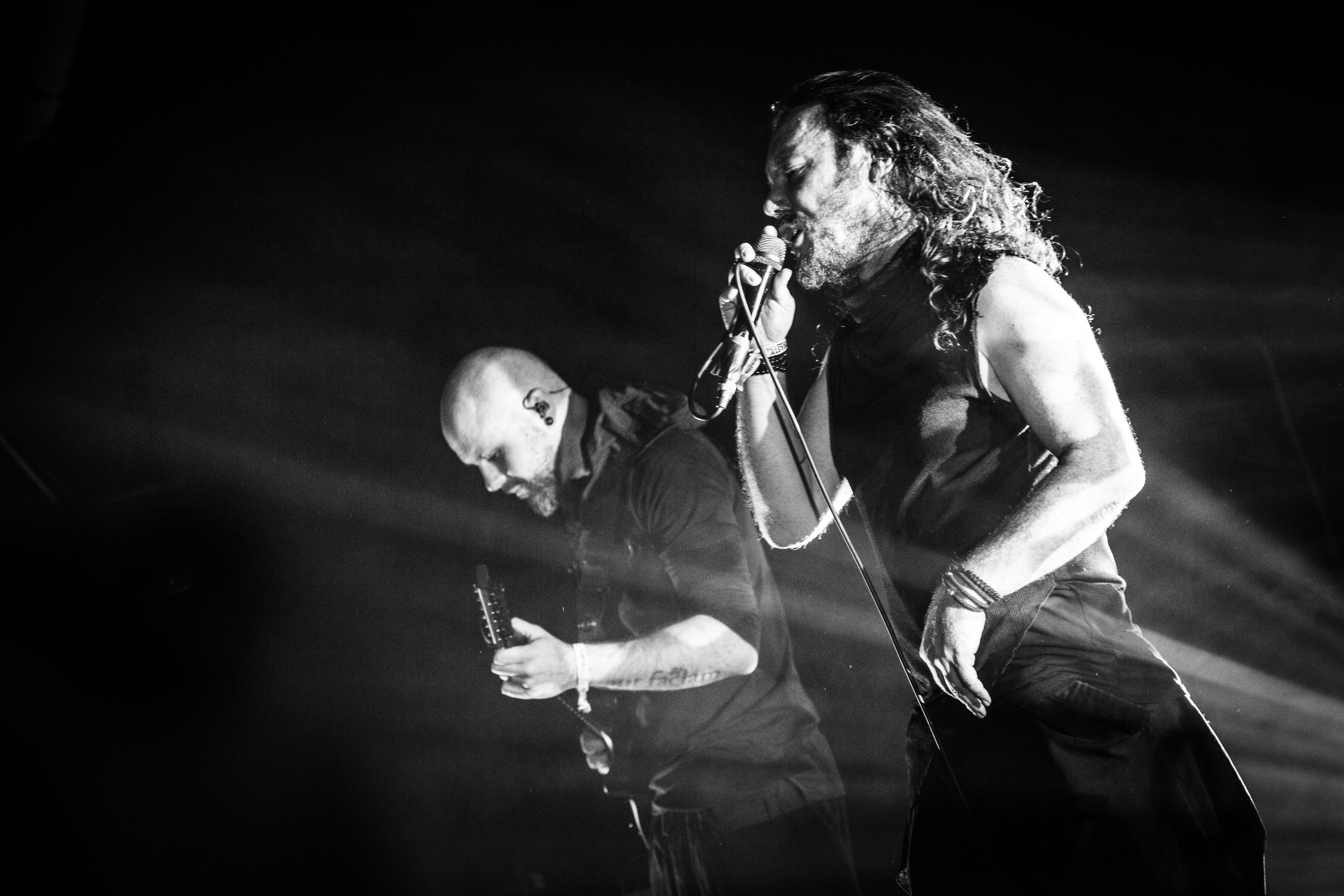
- Twelve Foot Ninja live at Euroblast Festival 2017

Background information
- Origin: Melbourne, Victoria, Australia
- Genres: Alternative metal; experimental rock; progressive metal; avant-garde metal; djent
- Years active: 2007–2024; 2025–present
- Label: Volkanik
- Members: Steve "Stevic" Mackay
- Past members: Shane "Russ" Russell; Rohan "Ro" Hayes; David de Vent; Nik (Kin Etik) Barker; Damon "Scrimdog" McKinnon; Fred Narkel
- Website: twelvefootninja.com

Twelve Foot Ninja are an Australian experimental metal band from Melbourne, Victoria. They released their debut album Silent Machine in 2012. The band consists of Kin (vocals), Russ (drums), Stevic (lead guitar), and Rohan (rhythm guitar). They won Best New Talent at the 2014 Revolver Golden Gods Awards (America's only hard rock music awards) as well as two listener-voted awards from SiriusXM's Liquid Metal the year before. The band broke a world record for the most amount crowdfunded for a music video. Their first headline tour of Europe in April 2017 sold out five of the seven UK shows. In mid 2022, the band announced an "indefinite hiatus". Although, they (with Nik Barker, departing vocalist) are working on an acoustic album of Twelve Foot Ninja material. The album was released on 11 July 2024 titled Mutant Dreams and Face Transplants: An Acoustic Experience. On the same day as the album's release, the band announced they had broken up.

== History ==
=== 2007–2011: Early years and early EPs ===
The band formed in 2007 by guitarist Stevic Mackay. After assembling a stable lineup, the band released their debut EP New Dawn in 2008, resulted in the band earning a Triple J Unearthed number 1 with the track "Dark Passenger", various support slots, and an appearance at Sydney's Come Together Festival.

Their second EP, Smoke Bomb, was released in November 2010. Produced by the band's guitarist Steve "Stevic" Mackay in his Melbourne home studio, the EP was mixed by local producer/engineer Hadyn Buxton (Trial Kennedy, Jonesez, Blueline Medic, Dukes of Windsor, Felix Riebl) and mastered by Howie Weinberg (Deftones, Nirvana, Jeff Buckley) at Masterdisk, New York City. Guest musicians on the release include Bär McKinnon (Mr. Bungle) on saxophone and Ollie McGill (Cat Empire) on keyboards.

=== 2012–2015: Silent Machine ===
Their debut studio album, Silent Machine, was released in November 2012. The album's first official single "Mother Sky" was released on 24 August and the video was premiered on Triple J's Home & Hosed blog. The second single "Coming for You" was released on 2 November 2012. Each song from the debut album came with a comic, created by Keith Draws (UK), inspired by the lyrics and based on the original fable of Twelve Foot Ninja (co-written by Steve "Stevic" Mackay). The story follows a sole ninja's mission to restore balance in a world headed toward a self-inflicted apocalypse All the individual comics were later combined into a 72-page bound comic book.

In early 2013, Twelve Foot Ninja embarked on their first headline tour of Australia and sold out every capital city. The band successfully completed a crowdfunding campaign on Australian site Pozible in May 2013 for a music video "Ain't That a Bitch" about a fantastic revenge story on an internet troll.

In October–November 2013, Twelve Foot Ninja toured Europe and North America for the first time. Their first show in London at the Camden Barfly sold out 3 weeks in advance and they also played Euroblast in Cologne, selling the most merchandise after the headliners Meshuggah. Their US/Canada tour in 2013 was opening for progressive metal band Periphery. In May 2014 Twelve Foot Ninja returned to North America for their first headline tour. They also played AEG festivals Rock on the Range, Carolina Rebellion, Welcome To Rockville, Rocklahoma. They were also invited to showcase at Michele Clark's revered radio conference in San Diego Sunset Sessions Rock.

In July 2014, the single "Coming for You" was serviced to US Active Rock radio and reached number 45 on the Active Rock chart. The video of "Coming for You" has reached over 4.1 million views on YouTube and their total channel views reached over 10 million. The band toured the US again from October to December 2014 in support of In This Moment.

=== 2016–2019: Outlier ===
In November 2015, Twelve Foot Ninja announced they were working on their second album for release late 2016. At that time they leaked an early track from the studio called "One Hand Killing". A few weeks later they released a video clip for the same track. The band also started a PledgeMusic campaign to help raise funds for the making of the new album and to start advance pre-orders. When talking to Loudwire vocalist Kin said "It has its roots in the 'Silent Machine' album but we're kind of experimenting with a few different things. There's more emphasis on songs and the actual songwriting as opposed to just riffs".

On 19 July 2016, Twelve Foot Ninja announced the title and release date of their second album, Outlier, released on 26 August 2016. Outlier debuted at #1 on the Australian 100% Independent Album chart, #2 on the ARIA Australian Artist Chart, and #6 on the overall ARIA chart. In the US, Outlier debuted at #15 on Billboard's Alternative Rock chart and #3 on Billboard's Heatseeker chart. The band were personally selected by Disturbed to be their support act on the 2016 Australian tour.

In April–May 2017, Twelve Foot Ninja toured Europe for the first time as a headliner. They sold out 5 of their 7 shows in the UK with strong numbers and some sold out shows in Holland, Germany, Switzerland, Czech Republic, Spain, and Italy. In July 2017, Twelve Foot Ninja announced their Monsoon Tour of Europe, India, and Nepal, book-ending the tour with headlining shows at Euroblast Festival in Cologne and Silence Festival in Kathmandu.

In 2019, long-serving bassist Damon McKinnon departed from the band.

=== 2020–2024: Vengeance, departure of Nik "Kin" Barker, indefinite hiatus and disbandment ===
On 27 May 2021, the band released a music video for the song "Long Way Home". It was announced that the song would feature on an upcoming album slated to be released in 2021. The second single, "Start the Fire", was released on 9 July 2021. The third single "Over and Out" was released on 9 September 2021.

In October 2021, the album Vengeance was released and debuted at number 20 on the ARIA charts.

On 17 December 2021, Nik Barker announced that he would depart the band in late 2022 after a final planned Australian tour and after a new vocalist is in place. The band have also announced an upcoming European tour for 2023 while in search for a new vocalist.

On 12 July 2022, the band announced they were going on indefinite hiatus and cancelling all their upcoming tours in 2023.

On 10 October 2023, the band soft-announced a new acoustics-only album (of an unknown title) via Bandcamp, by releasing a new single titled, "Everywhere I Look".

On 11 July 2024, the band released their acoustic album, Mutant Dreams and Face Transplants: An Acoustic Experience, and also announced they had broken up.

=== 2025–present: Return ===
On 29 July 2025, Steve MacKay announced he was reforming the band with an entirely new lineup.

== Musical style ==
Their musical style has been described as alternative metal, experimental rock, progressive metal, experimental metal, and djent.

== Members ==
=== Current ===
- Steve "Stevic" MacKay – lead guitar, production (2007–2024, 2025–present)

=== Former ===
- Nik "Kin Etik" Barker – lead vocals (2008–2024)
- Shane "Russ" Russell – drums (2008–2024)
- Damon McKinnon – bass (2008–2019)
- Fred Narkel – rhythm guitar (2008–2012)
- Rohan "Ro" Hayes – rhythm guitar, backing vocals (2012–2024)
- David de Vent – bass (2021–2024)

== Discography ==
=== Studio albums ===
List of studio albums, with selected details
Title	Details	Peak chart positions
Title	Details	AUS
Silent Machine	Released: 13 November 2012; Label: Volkanik Music (VOLKANIKCD3/VOLKANIKCD4); Format: CD, DD	—
Outlier	Released: 26 August 2016; Label: Volkanik Music (VOLKANIKCD5/VOLKANIKV5); Format: CD, DD, 2×LP, streaming	6
Vengeance	Released: 15 October 2021; Label: Volkanik Music (VOLKANIKCD6); Format: CD, DD, streaming	20
Mutant Dreams and Face Transplants: An Acoustic Experience	Released: 11 July 2024; Label: Volkanik Music; Format: DD, LP, streaming	—

=== Extended plays ===
List of extended plays, with selected details
Title	Details
New Dawn	Released: 1 November 2008; Label: Twelve Foot Ninja (TFN001); Formats: CD
Smoke Bomb!	Released: 30 October 2010; Label: Twelve Foot Ninja (TFN002); Formats: CD

== Awards and nominations ==
=== Golden Gods Awards ===
Best New Talent 2014

=== AIR Awards ===
The Australian Independent Record Awards (commonly known informally as AIR Awards) is an annual awards night to recognise, promote and celebrate the success of Australia's Independent Music sector.

Year	Nominee / work	Award	Result
2017	Outlier	Best Independent Hard Rock, Heavy or Punk Album	Nominated
2022	Vengeance	Best Independent Heavy Album or EP	Nominated

=== ARIA Music Awards ===
The ARIA Music Awards is an annual awards ceremony that recognises excellence, innovation, and achievement across all genres of Australian music.

Year	Nominee / work	Award	Result
2016	Outlier	Best Hard Rock or Heavy Metal Album	Nominated
