= Akouo =

Australian musician

- Also known as: Mynse (2004–2008)
- Born: Ryan Farrington; 1984 or 1985 (age 40–41)
- Origin: Launceston, Tasmania, Australia
- Genres: Electronic; dance; EDM; hip hop
- Occupations: Musician; DJ remixer; record producer; songwriter
- Instruments: Guitar; piano; keyboards; synthesizers
- Years active: 1990s–present
- Labels: Dew Process; Die High; Trench; Obese; Altrueistic (formerly)

Ryan Farrington (born c. 1985), known by his stage name Akouo (stylised in uppercase; pronounced AK-you-oh), previously known as Mynse, is an Australian electronic musician, producer and DJ. He is also a member of the hip hop duo Letters to the Sun with Coin Banks. He became the first Tasmanian-based act to perform at Splendour in the Grass in 2015. He has released one studio album: Outwit the Muscle (2008).

== Early life ==
Ryan Farrington was born in 1985 in Launceston, Tasmania. He started playing guitar when he was 12, and had been a disc jockey in the underground hip-hip scene of Tasmania since 2003. He has performed under many different names, until he came up with his current name 'Akouo', he stated that its means "to hear" or "to listen" in Greek.

== Music career ==
=== 1990s–2006: Early years and Altrueism ===
Farrington's music career began in the late 1990s where he played as an amateur guitarist in several bands throughout his hometown of Launceston. In 2003, he started performing as a disc jockey at local houses parties. A year later, he joined Launceston local MCs Azrael and Ethics and formed the hip hop group known as Altrueism where he performed under the alias "Mynse". Throughout 2005, the group toured with notable hip hop artists including: Bliss n Eso, Phrase, Heads of State, Tom Thum, among others. After releasing some limited-run demos and appearing on Alleyway Crawlerz Mixtapes (Volumes 1 & 2), the group parted ways in early-2006.

=== 2007–2013: Solo career and Letters to the Sun ===
Still performing under the name "Mynse", Farrington begun pursuing a solo-career, releasing The Mynstrual Cycle, a self produced street-EP in March 2007 under his own label, Altrueistic Recordings. The EP was described as containing "slightly off-center/deep tunes to hyped beats." To celebrate the EPs launch, Mynse performed it at the James Hotel in Launceston. After its release he performed solo in Tasmania and Victoria alongside artists such as Pegz, Funkoars, Vents, Bias B, Muph & Plutonic, and Bigfoot. These performances solidified his name as one of Tasmania's hardest working hip hop acts.

In 2008, Ryan started concentrating more on his DJing career. On 8 November, he released his debut hip hop album Outwit the Muscle under his new alias 'Akouo'. The album featured several prominent underground MCs like Javs, Thorts, Dunn D, and Phatchance. The album was featured on Triple J as their Feature Album of the Week, and the single "Lazy Days" received high rotation on the station. On 1 September 2010, Akouo collaborated with American MC Javs once more, and released the EP Double Helix.

In 2011, Akouo and Perth rapper Coin joined together and formed Letters to the Sun, they released a free promo-EP entitled Appetizers on 4 January 2012. In August, the duo released a single "Mile High Club" featuring vocals from Perth singer-songwriter Donovan de Souza, it would later be included on their then-upcoming self-titled album.

On 10 January 2013, Akouo's solo EP Above & Beyond was released. On 13 February, Akouo remixed "Terms and Conditions" by Chet Faker. On 22 March, they released their eponymous debut album. On 6 April, Flume's track "Bring You Down" featuring George Maple was remixed by Akouo. Akouo released another remix on 15 May, of "A Walk" by Tycho. Akouo's next solo EP, Hurcha, was released on 9 June. Akouo also began performing as a completely solo act in June. On 20 July, he remixed "Listen to Soul, Listen to Blues" by Safia.

=== 2014–2018: Mesa and Carbon ===
On 6 January 2014, he remixed Childish Gambino's track "3005", after which it and his remix of Flume's "Bring You Down" made his popularity grow after they gained traction and together receiving over 1,000,000 views across YouTube, SoundCloud and Spotify. Akouo released his single "Last Time" in February, as a teaser for his then upcoming EP, an accompanying music video was also released. In May, Akouo performed as an opening act for Safia. On 12 June, Akouo released his EP Mesa under the Die High Records label, it later peaked at No. 1 on the Australian iTunes Charts a week after. On 10 July, he remixed "Return to" by #1 Dads featuring Tom Snowden. On 8 October, he released a remix of "Paradise Awaits" by Zhu. On 15 October, he then made a remix of "Shiner" by Indian Summer featuring Ginger & The Ghost. On 27 November, he released a remix of "Unmissable" by Gorgon City.

On 13 January 2015, he released his single "Pieces". His single "All They Do" featuring Monsoonsiren and Mayo was later released on 26 January. On 29 May, he released a remix of "Xhampagne" by Shy Girls featuring Antwon. In July, he then became the first Tasmanian act to play at Splendour in the Grass. On 13 October, he remixed "Take it Slow" by Kultur featuring Blest Jones.

On 11 February 2016, Akouo released his single "Goldmine". On 1 March, he released a remix of "Weak" by Wet. On 18 March, Akouo released the single "Giving into You" featuring guest vocal by Ashibah. On 23 March, a remix of "Helix 2.0" by Robokid, AObeats & Manila Killa featuring Blaise Railey was released. On 1 April, Akouo released a remix of "Vampire" by Lazyboy Empire.

On 4 May 2017, Akouo released his single "Feel That" featuring vocals from Montaigne, alongside an accompanying music video. A month later, he announced a 15-date tour across Australia and New Zealand that August and September to promote the new single.

On 29 June 2018, Akouo remixed "Faded Away" by Sweater Beats featuring Icona Pop. On 8 July, he released the single "Painted On" featuring vocals from La'vel. On 12 July, he collaborated with Melbourne musician Lanks on the single "Yours", Akouo provided the beat for the track. He also released a remix of "Winnebago" by Gryffin featuring Quinn XCII and Daniel Wilson. The next day Akouo released his EP, entitled Carbon under Trench Records' label, it included the single "Painted On".

=== 2018–present: "So Long" ===
A new single entitled "So Long" was released on 12 October. On 29 December, Akouo performed at the Falls Festival in Marion Bay, Tasmania.

== Discography ==
=== Studio albums ===
List of studio albums
Title	Album details
Outwit the Muscle	Released: 8 November 2008; Label: Altrueistic Recordings; Format: CD, digital download

=== Collaborative albums ===
List of collaborative albums
Title	Album details
Letters to the Sun	Released: 22 March 2013; Label: Obese Records (LTTS001); Format: CD, digital download

=== Extended plays ===
List of extended plays
Title	EP details
as Mynse
The Mynstrual Cycle	Released: 2 March 2007; Label: Altrueistic Recordings; Format: Digital download
as Akouo
Double Helix (with Javs)	Released: 1 September 2010; Label: Self-released; Format: Digital download
Appetizers (with Coin)	Released: 4 January 2012; Label: Self-released; Format: CD, digital download
Above & Beyond	Released: 10 January 2013; Label: Self-released; Format: Digital download
Hurcha	Released: 9 June 2013; Label: Self-released; Format: Digital download
Mesa	Released: 12 June 2014; Label: Die High; Format: Digital download, streaming
Carbon	Released: 13 July 2018; Label: Dew Process, Trench; Format: Digital download, streaming

=== Singles ===
As lead artist

Title	Year	Album
"Lazy Days"	2008	Outwit the Muscle
"Mile High Club" (feat. Donovan de Souza)	2012	Letters to the Sun
"Last Time"	2014	Mesa
"Pieces"	2015	Non-album singles
"All They Do" (feat. Monsoonsiren and Mayo	2015	Non-album singles
"Goldmine"	2016	Non-album singles
"Giving into You" (feat. Ashibah)	2016	Non-album singles
"Feel That" (feat. Montaigne)	2017	Non-album singles
"Painted On" (feat. La'vel)	2018	Carbon
"So Long"	2018	Non-album single

As featured artist

Title	Year	Album
"Yours" (Lanka with Akouo)	2018	Twentyseven

=== Remixes ===
Year	Title	Artist(s)
2013	"Terms and Conditions"	Chet Faker
2013	"Bring You Down"	Flume (feat. George Maple)
2013	"A Walk"	Tycho
2013	"Listen to Soul, Listen to Blues"	Safia
2014	"3005"	Childish Gambino
2014	"Return to"	#1 Dads (feat. Tom Snowden)
2014	"Paradise Awaits"	Zhu
2014	"Shiner"	Indian Summer (feat. Ginger & The Ghost)
2014	"Unmissable"	Gorgon City
2015	"Xhampagne "	Shy Girls (feat. Antwon)
2015	"Take It Slow"	Kultur (feat. Blest Jones)
2016	"Weak"	Wet
2016	"Helix 2.0"	Robokid, AObeats & Manila Killa (feat. Blaise Railey)
2016	"Vampire"	Lazyboy Empire
2018	"Faded Away"	Sweater Beats (feat. Icona Pop)
2018	"Winnebago"	Gryffin (feat. Quinn XCII and Daniel Wilson)

=== Music videos ===
Title	Year	Director(s)
"Last Time"	2014	Scott Atkins
"Feel That" (featuring Montaigne)	2017	Bridget Peters; Simon Jackman
