= Montaigne (musician) =

Australian singer (born 1995)

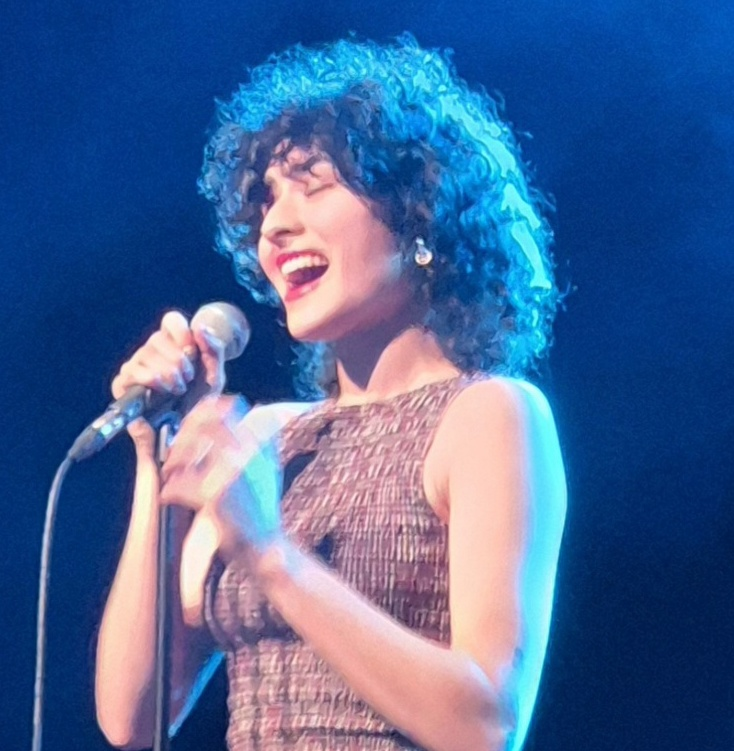
- Montaigne in September 2025
- Born: Jessica Alyssa Cerro; 14 August 1995 (age 31); Sydney, Australia
- Occupations: Musician; singer; streamer
- Years active: 2014–present
- Relatives: Gustavo Cerro (father)
- Musical career
- Genre: Art pop
- Instruments: Vocals; guitar; piano
- Label: Wonderlick
- Website: montaignemusic.com.au

Jessica Alyssa Cerro (born 14 August 1995), better known as Montaigne, is an Australian musician, singer and Twitch streamer. Their (Note: Montaigne uses they/them pronouns.) debut album, Glorious Heights, was released in August 2016 and peaked at No. 4 on the ARIA Albums Chart. At the ARIA Music Awards of 2016, they won Breakthrough Artist – Release for the album and received nominations in three other categories. In April 2016, they were a featured vocalist on Hilltop Hoods' track "1955" and "A Whole Day's Night, which reached No. 2 on the ARIA Singles Chart. They were supposed to represent Australia in the Eurovision Song Contest 2020 with the song "Don't Break Me" until the contest was cancelled due to the COVID-19 pandemic. Instead, they represented Australia in the Eurovision Song Contest 2021 with the song "Technicolour".

== Early life ==
Cerro was born in Sydney on 14 August 1995, and grew up in the Hills District. Their father, Gustavo Cerro, is an Argentinian former professional football player who played in the Australian National Soccer League. In October 2019, Montaigne captioned an Instagram picture of their ancestors, "So my ethnic background is a mixture of Argentinian, Spanish, Filipino and French, and these are my great grandparents from the French side..."

== Career ==
=== 2012–2013: Career beginnings ===
Cerro was a Triple J Unearthed High School finalist in 2012 with the indie pop song "Anyone But Me", but waited until finishing high school to pursue their music career. In November 2012, Cerro signed a publishing deal with Albert Music and spent the following two years refining their songwriting skills under the guidance of Michael Szumowski.

In late 2013, Cerro decided to adopt the moniker Montaigne, inspired by the 16th century philosopher and essayist Michel de Montaigne. Shortly after completing their HSC, Montaigne began recording their debut EP with producer Tony Buchen (The Preatures, Andy Bull).

=== 2014–2016: Glorious Heights ===
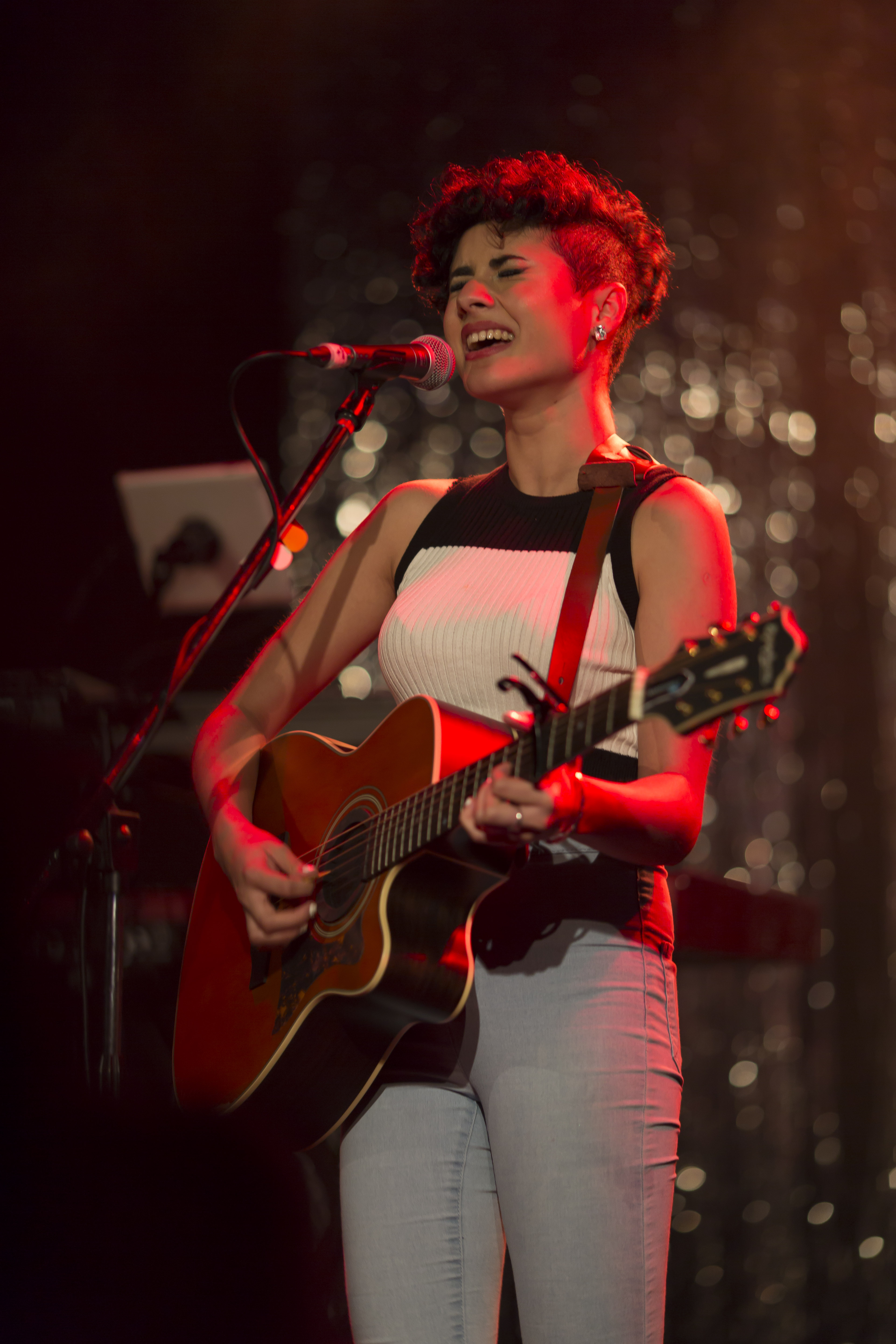
Montaigne performing in 2015

In 2014, Montaigne released their first single "I Am Not an End", which was added to high rotation on Triple J. In July 2014, Montaigne signed a management and recording deal with Wonderlick Entertainment. On 21 November 2014, Montaigne performed "I Am Not an End" for the radio station's Like a Version segment, along with their cover of Sia's "Chandelier". The song was listed as its 36th most played song of 2014. The same day Montaigne also released their second single "I'm a Fantastic Wreck", in conjunction with the Life of Montaigne EP. "I'm a Fantastic Wreck" also received high rotation on Triple J and Sydney-based community radio station FBi Radio, which also listed the song as its eighth most played song of 2014.

Montaigne was selected by San Cisco as the support act for their Run tour in November 2014. Shortly after, Montaigne was chosen by Megan Washington to be the main support for her February 2015 national There There tour.

In January 2015, Montaigne won FBi Radio's Next Big Thing Award at its annual SMAC Awards, which recognises "the musicians, artists, performers, restaurants and events that shaped the Sydney's creative culture in 2014". Montaigne announced their first headline tour in February 2015, visiting Brisbane, Sydney, Melbourne and Perth in April.

In August 2015, Montaigne released "Clip My Wings", the first single from their debut studio album, Glorious Heights. In January 2016, Montaigne released "In the Dark", the second single from their debut album, along with the announcement of the In the Dark Tour. A music video for the song followed in March. The following month, Montaigne featured on Hilltop Hoods' song "1955", which reached number two in Australia.

In June 2016, Montaigne released the third single from their debut album Glorious Heights, titled "Because I Love You". On 30 July, "Because I Love You" debuted at number 98 on the ARIA Singles Chart, marking Montaigne's first solo chart appearance. Glorious Heights was released a week later on 5 August. In November 2016, at the ARIA Music Awards of 2016, Montaigne won the ARIA award for Breakthrough Artist – Release.

=== 2017–2021: Complex and Eurovision Song Contest ===
On 4 May 2017, Montaigne was featured on Akouo's single "Feel That". In 2018, Montaigne was featured on the track "The Best Freestylers in the World" from the Aunty Donna album, The Album.

In November 2018, Montaigne released "For Your Love" as the lead single from their upcoming sophomore album. In June 2019, Montaigne released the second single "Ready" alongside the announcement that the album would be titled Complex. On 9 August 2019, the album's third single "Love Might Be Found (Volcano)" was released. The album was released on 30 August 2019, and debuted at #19 on the ARIA albums chart. "Ready" plays over the end credits of the 2022 film Good Luck to You, Leo Grande starring Emma Thompson.

On 6 December 2019, Montaigne, along with fellow singer Didirri, were announced as two out of the ten participating performers for Eurovision - Australia Decides the Australian national final in which the winner would represent Australia in the Eurovision Song Contest 2020 with the song "Don't Break Me". On 8 February 2020, Montaigne won the competition, and would have competed in the Eurovision Song Contest 2020, to be held in Rotterdam in May 2020, but on 18 March 2020, the EBU announced that the Eurovision Song Contest 2020 has been cancelled due to the uncertainty created by the spread of COVID-19. On 19 March 2020, Montaigne made a Facebook post clarifying their feelings, saying "I've had my cry. I spent a couple of hours paralysed in bed, despondently scrolling through the many lovely tweet mentions from people expressing their love and support. I imagine I'll probably have a lot more cries in the next little while, for me and for the wonderful team who were working with me to make our vision come to life." Montaigne has also stated to agree with the cancellation choice, saying it was "the most responsible and ethical decision that the EBU could have made."

On 2 April 2020, SBS confirmed that Montaigne would represent Australia at the 2021 contest.

Montaigne's Eurovision Song Contest 2021 entry, "Technicolour", was released on 5 March 2021. Later, SBS announced that following a risk assessment, they would not be sending a delegation to Rotterdam and would instead compete remotely using a pre-recorded live-on-tape performance. Currently, Montaigne is the only artist to have competed in Eurovision without being present in the host city.

On 18 May 2021, Montaigne competed in the first semi final of Eurovision 2021, however at the end of the show, Australia did not qualify for the final, as it didn't finish within the top ten countries. This marked the first time in Australia's participation that an Australian contestant failed to qualify for the final. It was later revealed that Australia had placed 14th in the first semi-final, with 28 points.

=== 2021–present: Making It! ===
On 3 January 2021, the hosts of the American podcast My Brother, My Brother and Me announced that they would stop using "(It's a) Departure" by The Long Winters as the podcast's long-running theme song due to controversial tweets by the band's frontman; after using various songs as placeholders, they revealed on 15 March 2021 that the new theme song would be "My Life Is Better with You", a track written and performed by Montaigne specifically for the podcast. The song was officially released on 13 August 2021, alongside an official music video featuring Montaigne and the hosts.

On 22 October 2021, Montaigne released "Now (In Space)", the lead single from their third studio album. On 9 February, Montaigne was cast in the Special Broadcasting Service musical comedy Time to Buy, marking their debut lead role as an actress. Alongside the announcement, Montaigne revealed that their third studio album would be released in 2022.

On 25 February 2022, Montaigne released "Always Be You" with Talking Heads' David Byrne. In an Instagram post announcing the release, Montaigne said "It's pretty much the biggest deal in the world for me to be able to collaborate with him", crediting his book How Music Works as a "groundbreaking read [and] totally changed how I approached live performance." On 8 July 2020, Montaigne released "Die B4 U" and announced the forthcoming release of their third studio album, Making It!, which was released on 2 September 2022.

In April 2022, "Because I Love You" was featured in the eighth episode of the Netflix series Heartstopper.

A portrait of Montaigne in oils and embroided fabric by Julia Gutman won the 2023 Archibald Prize. The artist said: "Jess and I have been friends for a few years and there is a lot of alignment in our practices; we are both interested in creating our own forms and approaches rather than strictly adhering to any one tradition. Montaigne's work defies genres, while their mercurial soprano has become an indelible part of the fabric of Australian music."

In 2023, the video game Stray Gods: The Roleplaying Musical was released, featuring songs co-written by Montaigne. Their work on the game was nominated for a Grammy for Best Score Soundtrack for Video Games and Other Interactive Media.

In June 2025, Montaigne released It's Hard to Be a Fish, their fourth studio album and first as an independent publisher after leaving Sony Music Australia at the end of 2023. Later that year, they supported fellow Eurovision 2020 and 2021 entrant Daði Freyr on his European tour.

== Personal life ==
Montaigne is bisexual, and came out as non-binary in 2023. They use they/them pronouns.

== Discography ==
=== Studio albums ===
| Title | Album details | Peak chart positions |
| Title | Album details | AUS |
|---|---|---|
| Glorious Heights | Release date: 5 August 2016; Label: Wonderlick Entertainment, Sony; Formats: CD, digital download, streaming | 4 |
| Complex | Release date: 30 August 2019; Label: Wonderlick Entertainment, Sony; Formats: CD, digital download, streaming | 19 |
| Making It! | Release date: 2 September 2022; Label: Wonderlick Entertainment, Sony; Formats: CD, digital download, streaming | — |
| It's Hard to Be a Fish | Release date: 20 June 2025; Label: Self-released; Formats: CD, digital download, streaming | — |
"–" denotes releases that did not chart.

=== Extended plays ===
| Title | EP details |
|---|---|
| Life of Montaigne | Release date: 21 November 2014; Label: Wonderlick Entertainment, Sony; Formats: CD, digital download, streaming |

=== Singles ===
==== As lead artist ====
List of singles as lead artist, with selected chart positions and certifications
| Title | Year | Peak chart positions | | Certifications | Album |
| Title | Year | AUS | LIT | Certifications | Album |
|---|---|---|---|---|---|
| "I Am Not an End" | 2014 | — | — | | Life of Montaigne |
| "I'm a Fantastic Wreck" | 2014 | — | — | | Life of Montaigne |
| "Clip My Wings" | 2015 | — | — | | Glorious Heights |
| "In the Dark" | 2016 | — | — | | Glorious Heights |
| "Because I Love You" | 2016 | 98 | — | ARIA: Platinum | Glorious Heights |
| "For Your Love" | 2018 | — | — | | Complex |
| "Ready" | 2019 | — | — | | Complex |
| "Love Might Be Found (Volcano)" | 2019 | — | — | | Complex |
| "The Dying Song" | 2019 | — | — | | Complex |
| "Don't Break Me" | 2020 | — (Note: Don't Break Me did not enter the ARIA top 100, but peaked at number 22 on the ARIA Digital Track Chart.) | — | | Non-album singles |
| "Technicolour" | 2021 | — | 42 | | Non-album singles |
| "My Life Is Better with You" | 2021 | — | — | | My Brother, My Brother and Me |
| "Now (In Space)" | 2021 | — | — | | Making It! |
| "Always Be You" (with David Byrne) | 2022 | — | — | | Making It! |
| "Make Me Feel So" (featuring Daði Freyr) | 2022 | — | — | | Making It! |
| "Die B4 U" | 2022 | — | — | | Making It! |
| "Gravity" (with David Byrne) | 2022 | — | — | | Making It! |
| "One Long Firework in the Sky" (with Ninajirachi) | 2022 | — | — | | Second Nature |
| "Talking Shit" | 2024 | — | — | | It's Hard to Be a Fish |
| "Everybody Else" | 2024 | — | — | | It's Hard to Be a Fish |
| "Swim Back" | 2025 | — | — | | It's Hard to Be a Fish |
| "It's All About the Money" | 2025 | — | — | | It's Hard to Be a Fish |
| "Beyond the Glass" | 2025 | — | — | | It's Hard to Be a Fish |
"–" denotes releases that did not chart.

==== As featured artist ====
List of singles as featured artist, with selected chart positions and certifications
| Song | Year | Peak chart positions | Certifications | Album |
| Song | Year | AUS | Certifications | Album |
|---|---|---|---|---|
| "1955" (Hilltop Hoods featuring Montaigne and Tom Thum) | 2016 | 2 | ARIA: 12× Platinum | Drinking from the Sun, Walking Under Stars Restrung |
| "Feel That" (Akouo featuring Montaigne) | 2017 | — | | Non-album singles |
| "You're the Voice" (as part of United Voices Against Domestic Violence) | 2017 | — | | Non-album singles |
| "I'll Make You Happy" (The Bamboos featuring Montaigne) | 2017 | — | | Rebeat |
| "Best Freestylers in the World" (Aunty Donna featuring Montaigne) | 2018 | — | | The Album |
| "A Whole Day's Night" (Hilltop Hoods featuring Montaigne & Tom Thum) | 2022 | — | | TBA |
| "Red Flags" (Tom Cardy featuring Montaigne) | 2022 | — | | Big Dumb Idiot |
| "Online" (TWRP featuring Tom Cardy & Montaigne) | 2024 | — | | Digital Nightmare |
| "Your World" (Peptalk featuring Montaigne) | 2024 | — | | |
"–" denotes releases that did not chart.

=== Other appearances ===
List of appearances on other albums or compilations
| Song | Year | Album |
|---|---|---|
| "Benevolence Riots" (Gang of Youths, uncredited) | 2014 | Non-album single |
| "Rubble of the Past" (Urthboy featuring Montaigne) | 2016 | The Past Beats Inside Me Like a Second Heartbeat |
| "Ashes to Ashes"(live) | 2018 | Countdown: Live at the Sydney Opera House |
| "Love is a Stranger"(live) | 2018 | Countdown: Live at the Sydney Opera House |
| "Truganini" (Amanda Palmer featuring Montaigne) | 2020 | Forty-Five Degrees - A Bushfire Charity Flash Record |
| "Sweetest Love" (Alice Ivy featuring Montaigne and Bertie Blackman) | 2020 | Don't Sleep |

== Awards and nominations ==
=== AIR Awards ===
The Australian Independent Record Awards (commonly known informally as AIR Awards) is an annual awards night to recognise, promote and celebrate the success of Australia's Independent Music sector.

| Year | Nominee / work | Award | Result | Ref. |
|---|---|---|---|---|
| 2026 | It's Hard to Be a Fish | Best Independent Pop Album or EP | Nominated | |

=== APRA Awards ===
The APRA Awards are several award ceremonies run in Australia by the Australasian Performing Right Association (APRA) to recognise composing and song writing skills, sales and airplay performance by its members annually.

| Year | Nominee / work | Award | Result |
|---|---|---|---|
| 2017 | "1955" (with Hilltop Hoods and Thom Thum) | Song of the Year | Nominated |

=== ARIA Music Awards ===
The ARIA Music Awards are annual awards, which recognises excellence, innovation, and achievement across all genres of Australian music. They commenced in 1987.

| Year | Nominee / work | Award | Result |
|---|---|---|---|
| 2016 | Glorious Heights | Best Female Artist | Nominated |
| 2016 | Glorious Heights | Breakthrough Artist | Won |
| 2016 | "1955" (with Hilltop Hoods and Thom Thum) | Song of the Year | Nominated |
| 2016 | "1955" (with Hilltop Hoods and Thom Thum) | Best Video | Nominated |
| 2016 | Tony Buchan for Glorious Heights | Producer of the Year | Nominated |

=== Grammy Awards ===
The Grammy Awards are awarded annually by the National Academy of Recording Arts and Sciences of the United States.

| Year | Nominee / work | Award | Result |
|---|---|---|---|
| 2024 | Stray Gods: The Roleplaying Musical (along with Tripod and Austin Wintory) | Best Score Soundtrack for Video Games and Other Interactive Media | Nominated |

=== J Awards ===
The J Awards are an annual series of Australian music awards that were established by the Australian Broadcasting Corporation's youth-focused radio station Triple J. They commenced in 2005.

| Year | Nominee / work | Award | Result |
|---|---|---|---|
| 2016 | Glorious Heights | Australian Album of the Year | Nominated |

=== National Live Music Awards ===
The National Live Music Awards (NLMAs) are a broad recognition of Australia's diverse live industry, celebrating the success of the Australian live scene. The awards commenced in 2016.

| Year | Nominee / work | Award | Result |
|---|---|---|---|
| 2016 | Themself | Live Voice of the Year | Nominated |
| 2017 | Themself | Live Act of the Year | Nominated |
| 2017 | Themself | Live Pop Act of the Year | Nominated |
| 2020 | Themself | Live Voice of the Year | Nominated |

== Notes ==
Awards and achievements
| Preceded by Kate Miller-Heidke with "Zero Gravity" | Australia in the Eurovision Song Contest; 2020 (cancelled) | Succeeded by themself with "Technicolour" |
| Preceded by themself with "Don't Break Me" | Australia in the Eurovision Song Contest; 2021 | Succeeded by Sheldon Riley with "Not the Same" |
