= Vengeance (Twelve Foot Ninja album) =

Studio album by Twelve Foot Ninja
- Released: 15 October 2021
- Studio: Sing Sing, Melbourne
- Genre: Experimental rock; djent; alternative metal; progressive metal
- Length: 34:15
- Label: Volkanik Music
- Producer: Steve "Stevic" MacKay

Twelve Foot Ninja chronology
Outlier (2016)	Vengeance (2021)

Singles from Vengeance
- 1. "Start the Fire" Released: 9 July 2021; 2. "Long Way Home" Released: 12 July 2021; 3. "Over and Out" Released: 14 September 2021

Vengeance is the third and final studio album by Australian alternative metal band Twelve Foot Ninja. It was released on 15 October 2021 and contains ten tracks. It is part of a multimedia project that includes a 1000-page high fantasy novel titled The Wyvern and the Wolf by Nicholas Snelling and a graphic novel based on the concept of the album. The album entered the ARIA Albums Chart at number 20 during its first week of release.

On 17 December 2021, vocalist Nik Barker announced that he would depart the band in late 2022 after a final planned Australian tour and after a new vocalist is in place. The band has also announced an upcoming European tour for 2023 while in search for a new vocalist. However, on 12 July 2022, the band announced their hiatus and canceled all their upcoming tours in 2023. The band split up after releasing an acoustic re-recording album in 2024.

== Critical reception ==
Professional ratings
Review scores
Source	Rating
AllMusic	4.5/5
Metal Injection	9/10
Wall of Sound	7/10

Vengeance received a few positive reviews. Jimmy Glinster of Heavy magazine wrote an unrated track-by-track review for the album.

== Track listing ==
Vengeance track listing
No.	Title	Length
1.	"Start the Fire"	4:10
2.	"Long Way Home"	3:02
3.	"Vengeance"	3:27
4.	"IDK"	3:03
5.	"Shock to the System"	3:19
6.	"Gone"	3:24
7.	"Culture War"	3:35
8.	"Dead End"	3:44
9.	"Over and Out"	3:30
10.	"Tangled"	3:01
Total length:		34:15

== Personnel ==
Twelve Foot Ninja

- Kin Etik – lead vocals
- Steve "Stevic" MacKay – lead guitar
- Rohan Hayes – rhythm guitar, backing vocals
- Shane "Russ" Russell – drums

Additional musicians

- Tatiana Shmayluk (Jinjer) – vocals on track 9
- Anonymous bassists tracks 1–5, 7–10
- Hadrien Feraud bass on track 6

== Charts ==
Chart performance for Vengeance
Chart (2021)	Peak position
Australian Albums (ARIA)	20
