= Next to You (L D R U song) =

Single by L D R U featuring Savoi

from the album Sizzlar
- Released: 22 April 2016
- Length: 2:56
- Label: Audiopaxx
- Songwriter(s): Drew Carmody; Brian White
- Producer(s): Drew Carmody

L D R U singles chronology
"Keeping Score" (2015)	"Next to You" (2016)	"To Be Free" (2017)

Music video
- "Next to You" on YouTube

"Next to You" is a song recorded by Australian record producer L D R U, featuring Brisbane-based vocalist Savoi and was released in April 2016 as the second single from L D R U's debut studio album, Sizzlar (2017).

In January 2017, the song was voted number 68 in the Triple J Hottest 100, 2016. It was certified gold in Australia in 2017.

== Track listing ==
- Digital download
1. "Next to You" – 2:56
- Digital download
1. "Next to You" (Barely Alive and Virtual Riot remix)– 4:24
2. "Next to You" (Kyle Watson remix)– 5:19
3. "Next to You" (Nine Lives remix)– 3:48
4. "Next to You" (No Way Back remix)– 3:12
5. "Next to You" (Time Pilot remix)– 3:26
6. "Next to You" (Onda remix)– 2:50

== Certification ==
Region	Certification	Certified units/sales
Australia (ARIA)	Gold	35,000^{‡}
^{‡} Sales+streaming figures based on certification alone.
