= Sizzlar =

Studio album by L D R U
- Released: 14 July 2017
- Genre: Electronic
- Length: 31:11
- Label: Sony Australia
- Producer: Drew Carmody

Singles from Sizzlar
- 1. "Keeping Score" Released: September 2015; 2. "Next to You" Released: 22 April 2016; 3. "To Be Free" Released: 24 February 2017; 4. "Me" Released: 30 June 2017

Sizzlar is the debut studio album by Australian record producer, L D R U. The album was released on 14 July 2017 and peaked at number 66 on the Australian ARIA Albums Chart. A remix album was released in February 2018.

When speaking about the album, Carmody said "Take My" is his favourite track because "it's kind of a bit different and out of the norm to what I'd usually do... It was about a one night stand and picking up girls in the club, so it was kind of a fun process to write about."

== Track listing ==
Sizzlar track listing
No.	Title	Writer(s)	Length
1.	"The Calling"	Drew Carmody; Sarah Aarons	3:46
2.	"Keeping Score" (featuring Paige IV)	Carmody; Aarons	3:03
3.	"Take My" (featuring Rob Taylor)	Carmody; Rob Taylor	3:36
4.	"Next to You" (featuring Savoi)	Carmody; Brian White	2:56
5.	"Pop That"	Carmody	3:20
6.	"Me" (featuring BOI)	Carmody; Aarons	3:37
7.	"Shapes" (L D R U x Karma Fields)	Carmody; Rosette Sharma; Tim Nelson	4:06
8.	"To Be Free"	Alexander Burnett; Anita Blay; Carmody	3:15
9.	"Dirty Seeds"	Carmody	3:43
Total length:			31:11

== Charts ==
Chart performance for Sizzlar
Chart (2017)	Peak position
Australian Albums (ARIA)	66

== Release history ==
Release history and formats for Sizzlar
Region	Date	Format	Label	Catalogue
Australia	14 July 2017	Digital download; CD	Sony Music Australia	88985460772
