= Silent Machine =

Studio album by Twelve Foot Ninja
- Released: 13 November 2012
- Genre: Alternative metal; avant-garde metal; funk metal; djent
- Length: 45:00
- Label: Volkanik Music
- Producer: Steve MacKay

Twelve Foot Ninja chronology
Silent Machine (2012)	Outlier (2016)

Professional ratings
Review scores
Source	Rating
MetalSucks	4.5/5 stars
Sputnikmusic	4.5/5 stars

Silent Machine is the debut studio album by the Australian alternative metal band Twelve Foot Ninja. It was released through Volkanik Music on November 13, 2012.

== Track listing ==
No.	Title	Length
1.	"Coming for You"	3:05
2.	"Kingdom"	3:42
3.	"Mother Sky"	4:16
4.	"Shuriken"	3:21
5.	"Vanguard"	2:54
6.	"Deluge"	4:29
7.	"Liberation"	3:13
8.	"Silent Machine"	4:17
9.	"Rogue"	3:50
10.	"Myth of Progress"	3:40
11.	"Ain't That a Bitch"	4:41
12.	"Luna"	3:42
Total length:		45:00

== Personnel ==
- Kin Etik – lead vocals
- Steve "Stevic" MacKay – lead guitar
- Rohan Hayes – rhythm guitar, backing vocals
- Damon McKinnon – bass guitar
- Shane "Russ" Russell – drums

Additional musicians

- Ben Grayson – Hammond, clav, Rhodes, whurli, piano
- Nicholas Jeanney – guitar solo on track 6, additional production on track 6, dubstep synth on track 4
- Keith Draws – art direction, illustration
- John Calabro – graphic design, album layout
- Sam Luxford – graphic design, album layout
