= Complex (album) =

Studio album by Montaigne
- Released: 30 August 2019
- Length: 47:16
- Labels: Wonderlick Entertainment, Sony

Montaigne chronology
Glorious Heights (2016)	Complex (2019)	Making It! (2022)

Singles from Complex
- 1. "For Your Love" Released: 9 November 2018; 2. "Ready" Released: 11 June 2019; 3. "Love Might Be Found (Volcano)" Released: 9 August 2019; 4. "The Dying Song" Released: December 2019

Complex is the second studio album by Australian art pop singer-songwriter Montaigne. It was released on 30 August 2019.

Prior to release, Montaigne said the tracks on the album "all came together over a couple of years and each song pertains to a different period of my life." They said "It's basically a series of portraits of all of my insecurities, or the weird relationships I've been in, or neurotic feelings I've felt while being attracted to others. The album's like this veil behind which I stashed all these secrets I was keeping from myself."

The album was supported by a 13-date national tour in November 2019.

== Reception ==
Jeff Jenkins from Stack Magazine called it "one of the year's finest records." saying "[They] pack more thrills into that opening track, 'Change' than most pop artists deliver in their career." adding "Montaigne is a storyteller for our times – fearless, feisty, combative and yes, complex."

== Track listing ==
No.	Title	Writer(s)	Length
1.	"CHANGE"	Jessica Cerro; Tony Buchen; Leon Zervos	3:18
2.	"Complex"	Cerro; Jarrad Rogers; Zervos	3:46
3.	"For Your Love"	Cerro; Kyle Shearer; MoZella	4:19
4.	"Losing My Mind"	Cerro; Thomas Rawle	3:14
5.	"Love Might Be Found (Volcano)"	Cerro; Wynne Bennett	3:43
6.	"The Dying Song"	Cerro; Buchen	3:24
7.	"Showyourself"	Cerro; Mario Spate	1:34
8.	"Please You"	Cerro; Buchen	3:48
9.	"Stockholm Syndrome"	Cerro; David Andrew Sitek	5:03
10.	"Pleasure"	Cerro; Rawle	3:23
11.	"is this all I am good for?"	Cerro; Buchen	5:06
12.	"I am a Clown"	Cerro; Buchen; Mauro Refosco	3:15
13.	"READY"	Cerro; Ryosuke Sakai; Jaidyn Edwards; Charlotte Gemmill	3:23
Total length:			47:16

== Personnel ==
- Montaigne – vocals
- Wynne Bennett – production on "Love Might Be Found (Volcano)"
- Tony Buchen – mixing on "Losing My Mind", "Love Might Be Found (Volcano)", and "Stockholm Syndrome"; production on "Losing My Mind"; production, recording, and mixing on "Change", "The Dying Song", "Please You", "Is This All I Am Good For?", and "I Am a Clown"
- Dr R. – production on "Ready"
- Eric J. Dubowsky – production on "Ready", mixing on "Pleasure" and "Ready"
- Thomas Rawle – production on "Losing My Mind" and "Pleasure"
- Jarrad Rogers – production and mixing on "Complex"
- David Andrew Sitek – production on "Stockholm Syndrome"
- Mario Spate – production and mixing on "Showyourself"
- Leon Zervos – mastering

== Charts ==
Chart (2019)	Peak position
Australian Albums (ARIA)	19

== Release history ==
Region	Date	Format	Label	Catalogue
Various	30 August 2019	CD, digital download, streaming	Wonderlick Entertainment, Sony Music Australia	LICK031
Australia	30 August 2019	Limited edition red vinyl	Wonderlick Entertainment, Sony Music Australia	LICK032
