= Joe Chindamo =

Australian composer and pianist

Joe Chindamo OAM (born 1961) is an Australian composer and pianist.

== Career ==
He recorded an album with violinist Zoë Black in 2012. It was followed by Dido's Lament and The New Goldberg Variations. In 2014, Chindamo's string quartet Tempesta was commissioned and performed by the Acacia Quartet and by the Australian String Quartet on their national tour in 2016. His Toccata for Solo Violin, commissioned by Australian violinist Sarah Curro, was performed by Ann Marie Johnson at the ABC Young Performers' Awards and recorded by Zoe Black for their album Symbiosis in 2017. In 2014 two of his Baroque re-imaginings for string orchestra were performed by ACO Collective.

His other works include Palimpsest, performed as part of the QSO Maestro Series conducted by Muhai Tang; Sanctuary, a double oboe and Cor Anglais concerto composed for Diana Doherty, Alexandre Ougey and Camerata, performed at the Queensland Music Festival; American Spirit composed for Black, and Fantaskatto, a vocal scat concerto composed for Olivia Chindamo, both performed by the Queensland Symphony Orchestra.

In 2017, Chindamo began a collaboration with librettist Steve Vizard. They created Vigil, a one-woman show starring Christie Whelan Browne which was performed at the Adelaide Cabaret Festival and the Fairfax Studio (Melbourne Arts Centre). He arranged several songs for The Great American Song Book by James Morrison. His arrangement of 'Round Midnight was performed by Morrison and the BBC Orchestra at the BBC Proms in London. He was commissioned to compose a drum concerto for the Melbourne Symphony Orchestra which was premiered at "The Last Night at the Proms" concert in March 2018 at Hamer Hall and was conducted by Andrew Davis.

Chindamo was awarded the Medal of the Order of Australia in the 2022 Queen's Birthday Honours.

== Discography ==
=== Albums ===
List of albums, with selected details
Title	Details
The First Take With Ray Brown (with Ray Brown)	Released: 1994; Format: CD; Label: Muzak, Inc. (MZCS-1236)
A Brief History of Standard Time	Released: 1995; Format: CD; Label: Festival Records (D31135)
Reflected Journey (with Brecker Brothers)	Released: 1997; Format: CD; Label: Muzak, Inc. (MZCS-1236)
Anyone Who Had a Heart: The Music of Burt Bacharach	Released: November 1997; Format: CD; Label: Larrikin (LRF499)
The Joy of Standards (as Joe Chindamo Trio)	Released: 2001; Format: CD; Label: Newmarket Music (NEW3074.2)
Tender Is the Night (with Nina Ferro)	Released: 2001; Format: CD; Label: Newmarket Music (NEW 3085.2)
America! Joe Chindamo Trio Plays The Paul Simon Song Book (as Joe Chindamo Trio)	Released: 2002; Format: CD; Label: Newmarket Music (NEW3104.2)
Paradiso: The Joy of Film Music	Released: 2002; Format: CD; Label: Newmarket Music (NEW 3138.2)
Love, Blues and Other Fiction (with Graeme Lyall)	Released: 2004; Format: CD; Label: Newmarket Music (NEW 3163.2)
Smokingun (as Joe Chindamo Trio with Graeme Lyall)	Released: 2004; Format: CD; Label: Newmarket Music (NEW 3180.2)
Solo - Live at Umbria Jazz '05, Italy	Released: 2005; Format: CD; Label: Newmarket Music (NEW 3205.2)
2x2 (with James Morrison)	Released: 2006; Format: CD; Label: Morrison Records
"Charade" Henry Mancini Song Book (with Janet Seidel)	Released: 2007; Format: CD; Label: La Brava Music (LB0077)
Duende: The Romantic Project	Released: 2007; Format: CD; Label: Jazzhead (HEAD090)
Another Place Some Other Time	Released: 2010; Format: CD; Label: Jazzhead (HEAD125)
Hush collection. Volume 11, Luminous :Inspired by Mozart (with Zoë Black & friends)	Released: September 2011; Format: CD, digital; Label: Hush Collection
Reimaginings (with Zoë Black)	Released: 2012; Format: CD, digital; Label: Which Way Music (WWM016)
Dido's Lament (with Zoë Black)	Released: 2013; Format: CD, digital; Label: Mo'OzArt (MOZ001)
The New Goldberg Variations (with Zoë Black)	Released: October 2015; Format: digital; Label: Alfi
Symbiosis (with Zoë Black)	Released:June 2018; Format: digital; Label: Alfi
Arias	Released: October 2019; Format: digital; Label: ORiGiN

== Awards and honours ==
=== AIR Awards ===
The Australian Independent Record Awards (commonly known informally as AIR Awards) is an annual awards night to recognise, promote and celebrate the success of Australia's independent music sector.

Year	Nominee / work	Award	Result
2010	Another Place and Time	Best Independent Jazz Album	Nominated
2020	Arias	Best Independent Jazz Album or EP	Nominated

=== APRA Awards ===
The APRA Awards are held in Australia and New Zealand by the Australasian Performing Right Association to recognise songwriting skills, sales and airplay performance by its members annually.

Year	Nominee / work	Award	Result
2009.	"Something Will Come to Light"	Jazz Work of the Year	Won
2009.	"Moments and Eternities"	Jazz Work of the Year	Nominated

=== ARIA Music Awards ===
The ARIA Music Awards are presented annually from 1987 by the Australian Recording Industry Association (ARIA). Chindamo has been nominated for seven awards.

Year	Nominee / work	Award	Result	Ref.
1998	Anyone Who Had a Heart	Best Jazz Album	Nominated	
2001	The Joy of Standards (as Joe Chindamo Trio)	Best Jazz Album	Nominated	
2007	Smokingun (with Graeme Lyall)	Best Jazz Album	Nominated	
2008	Duende The Romantic Project	Best Jazz Album	Nominated	
2010	Another Place Some Other Time	Best Jazz Album	Nominated	
2014	Dido's Lament (with Zoë Black)	Best Classical Album	Nominated	
2016	The New Goldberg Variations (with Zoë Black)	Best Classical Album	Nominated	

=== Mo Awards ===
The Australian Entertainment Mo Awards (commonly known informally as the Mo Awards) were annual Australian entertainment industry awards. They recognised achievements in live entertainment in Australia from 1975 to 2016. Chindamo won two awards in that time.

Year	Nominee / work	Award	Result (wins only)
2001	Joe Chindamo	Jazz Instrumental Performer of the Year	Won
2003	Joe Chindamo	Jazz Instrumental Performer of the Year	Won
