= Zoë Black =

Australian musician

Zoë Black is an Australian violinist who plays with the Australian Chamber Orchestra, and is a recitalist and soloist.

Black has worked extensively with pianist and composer Joe Chindamo. Together they were nominated for the 2014 and 2016 ARIA Awards for Best Classical Album for their albums Dido's Lament and The New Goldberg Variations.

In 2011 Chindamo, Black and friends (Daniel Farrugia, Philip Rex, Sarah Curro, Caroline Henbest and Josephine Vains) released Hush collection. Volume 11, Luminous : inspired by Mozart for the Hush project which supports children's hospitals around Australia.

== Discography ==
=== Albums ===
List of albums, with selected details
| Title | Details |
|---|---|
| D'aujourd'hui (with Daniel McKay) | Released: 2008; Format: CD, digital; Label: Move |
| Hush collection. Volume 11, Luminous :Inspired by Mozart (with Joe Chindamo & friends) | Released: September 2011; Format: CD, digital; Label: Hush Collection |
| Reimaginings (with Joe Chindamo) | Released: 2012; Format: CD, digital; Label: Which Way Music (WWM016) |
| Dido's Lament (with Joe Chindamo) | Released: 2013; Format: CD, digital; Label: Mo'OzArt (MOZ001) |
| The New Goldberg Variations (with Joe Chindamo) | Released: October 2015; Format: digital; Label: Alfi |
| Symbiosis (with Joe Chindamo) | Released:June 2018; Format: digital; Label: Alfi |

== Awards and nominations ==
=== ARIA Music Awards ===
The ARIA Music Awards are presented annually from 1987 by the Australian Recording Industry Association (ARIA).

| Year | Nominee / work | Award | Result | Ref. |
|---|---|---|---|---|
| 2014 | Dido's Lament (with Joe Chindamo) | Best Classical Album | Nominated | |
| 2016 | The New Goldberg Variations (with Joe Chindamo) | Best Classical Album | Nominated | |
