= Glorious Heights =

Studio album by Montaigne
- Released: 5 August 2016
- Studios: Studio Le Pavois, Sony Music Studios; Sydney
- Labels: Wonderlick Entertainment, Sony
- Producer: Tony Buchen

Montaigne chronology
| Life of Montaigne (2014) | Glorious Heights (2016) | Complex (2019) |

Singles from Glorious Heights
- 1. "Clip My Wings" Released: 28 August 2015; 2. "In the Dark" Released: January 2016; 3. "Because I Love You" Released: 3 June 2016

Glorious Heights is the debut studio album by Australian art pop singer-songwriter Montaigne. It was released in August 2016 and peaked at number 4 on the ARIA Charts.

At the ARIA Music Awards of 2016, the album was nominated for Best Female Artist and won Breakthrough Artist – Release.

At the J Awards of 2016, the album was nominated for Australian Album of the Year.

== Reception ==
Professional ratings
Review scores
| Source | Rating |
|---|---|
| The AU Review | 8.4/10 |
| The Music Insight | 8.5/5 stars |

Dylan Marshall from The AU Review called Glorious Heights "a momentous beginning" and "one of the albums that you can sit down, listen to and genuinely just really enjoy the moment; whether for its music, vocals, lyrics, themes, or a sweet combination of them all."

Isadora Vadasz from The Music Insight stated that "Over 13 tracks, Montaigne takes [their] listeners on an epic journey of wild highs and sullen lows... The resulting sound beckons you into a dark circus tent full of temptations and pleasant surprises."

Jeff Jenkins from Stack Magazine said "[Montaigne]'s debut album is aptly titled, with the singer delivering thrilling electro pop infused with genuine soul. [They're] just as effective when [they] straighten up and simplify things – check out the ballad 'Consolation Prize' and the pure pop of 'What You Mean to Me'. A star is born."

Banda Wilson from Music Feeds wrote: "Glorious Heights is a record that is built around Montaigne's inimitable voice. Pretty much everything else created with the goal of featuring [their] vocals in a variety of contexts, in an effort to show off [their] vocal skillset."

== Track listing ==
All tracks are written by Jessica Cerro and Tony Buchen, except where noted.

| No. | Title | Writer(s) | Length |
|---|---|---|---|
| 1. | "Glorious Heights" | Cerro | 4:15 |
| 2. | "In the Dark" | | 3:21 |
| 3. | "Till It Kills Me" | | 3:11 |
| 4. | "Because I Love You" | | 3:37 |
| 5. | "What You Mean to Me" | Cerro | 4:02 |
| 6. | "Consolation Prize" | Cerro; Kate Miller-Heidke; Georgi Kay; Robert Conley | 3:53 |
| 7. | "Come Back to Me" (interlude) | | 1:31 |
| 8. | "Come Back to Me" | | 3:35 |
| 9. | "Greater Than Me" | | 3:11 |
| 10. | "Clip My Wings" | | 3:30 |
| 11. | "Lie to Myself" | Cerro | 4:48 |
| 12. | "Lonely" | | 4:29 |
| 13. | "I Am Behind You" | | 9:28 |

== Personnel ==
- Montaigne – vocals
- Tony Buchen – production, recording, mixing
- Next Episode – design
- Wes Talbott – art
- Leon Zervos – mastering

== Charts ==
| Chart (2016) | Peak position |
|---|---|
| Australian Albums (ARIA) | 4 |

== Release history ==
| Region | Date | Format | Label | Catalogue |
|---|---|---|---|---|
| Australia | 5 August 2016 | CD, digital download | Wonderlick Entertainment, Sony Music Australia | LICK016 |
| Australia | 20 April 2024 | LP (Record Store Day release) | Wonderlick Entertainment, Sony Music Australia | |
