= Songbird (Bernard Fanning song) =

Single by Bernard Fanning

from the album Tea & Sympathy
- Released: 2005
- Recorded: Real World Studios
- Genre: Rock
- Length: 2:36
- Label: Dew Process
- Songwriter: Bernard Fanning
- Producers: Tchad Blake & Bernard Fanning

Bernard Fanning singles chronology
"Wish You Well" (2005)	"Songbird" (2005)	"Watch Over Me" (2006)

"Songbird" is the second single from Bernard Fanning's solo debut album Tea & Sympathy, released in 2005. It reached number 11 on the Australian national airplay chart in January 2006, and was number 14 on Triple J Hottest 100 in 2005.

At the Q Song Awards of 2006, the song won Published song of the Year.

== Production ==
"Songbird"
13 second sample from Bernard Fanning's "Songbird"

The song was recorded in the first set of sessions for Tea & Sympathy in Peter Gabriel's Bath studio Real World Studios in mid-2005. The song features multi-instrumentalist John Bedggood on violin.

== Music video ==
The music video for "Songbird" was filmed by Head Pictures who previously worked with Fanning on his prior single "Wish You Well" .

Set in a grand Queensland house, the music clip features Fanning playing an acoustic guitar and singing the song facing the camera. Fanning spins on the spot while the camera films the song, however there are several cuts of him doing this in differently coloured rooms with Fanning wearing different clothing in each cut, however assuming the same position from the prior shot, blending each shot seamlessly. Each shot usually lasts about 1–5 seconds, though there are some faster transitions providing a speedy shutter effect.

== Charts ==
Chart (2006)	Peak position
Australia Digital Sales (ARIA Charts)	30

== Certifications ==
Certifications for "Songbird"
Region	Certification	Certified units/sales
Australia (ARIA)	4× Platinum	280,000^{‡}
^{‡} Sales+streaming figures based on certification alone.
