= Weekend of Mystery =

2006 single by Bernard Fanning

Single by Bernard Fanning

from the album Tea & Sympathy
- Released: 15 August 2006
- Recorded: May–June 2005
- Studio: Real World Studios, Bath, England
- Genre: Rock
- Length: 3:26
- Label: Dew Process
- Songwriter: Bernard Fanning
- Producers: Tchad Blake; Bernard Fanning

Bernard Fanning singles chronology
"Watch Over Me" (2006)	"Weekend of Mystery" (2006)

"Weekend of Mystery" is the fourth and final single from Bernard Fanning's 2005 debut album Tea & Sympathy. The single was released as an iTunes Store exclusive single on 15 August 2006. It was not included on regular CD versions of Tea & Sympathy, but rather only on the iTunes edition. "Weekend of Mystery" was first performed live by Fanning in 2002 in Melbourne, in a concert designed to raise awareness of issues relating to Woomera Detention Centre.

== Track listing ==
1. "Weekend of Mystery" – 3:26
