= Wish You Well (Bernard Fanning song) =

Single by Bernard Fanning

from the album Tea & Sympathy
- Released: 2005
- Genre: Rock
- Length: 2:31
- Songwriter: Bernard Fanning

Bernard Fanning singles chronology
"Wish You Well" (2005)	"Songbird" (2005)

Audio sample
- 20-second sample from Bernard Fanning's "Wish You Well": file; help

"Wish You Well" is the first single from Australian rock musician Bernard Fanning's solo debut album, Tea & Sympathy, released in 2005 and was voted number 1 on the Triple J Hottest 100 of 2005 and placed 57 on the Triple J Hottest 100 of Australian Songs in 2025. "Wish You Well" peaked in the top 30 on the New Zealand Singles Chart.

== Production ==
In 2005 in an interview with Triple J, Bernard Fanning revealed that they smashed plates in the studio to create an interesting snare sound which can be heard very faintly on every second snare hit throughout the song. "We tried using hand claps and tambourines, but the sound wasn't quite 'right', so we ended up using the smashing plates."

== Music video ==
The music video for "Wish You Well" was directed by Damon Escott and Stephen Lance of Head Pictures and won Best Video at ARIA Music Awards of 2006.

The video clip starts with Fanning sitting adjacent to antiques, one including a gramophone. After standing up he holds a portrait of the forest.

== Charts ==
Chart performance for "Wish You Well"
Chart (2005–2006)	Peak position
Australia Digital Tracks (ARIA)	21
New Zealand (Recorded Music NZ)	24

== Certifications ==
Certifications for "Wish You Well"
Region	Certification	Certified units/sales
Australia (ARIA)	8× Platinum	560,000^{‡}
^{‡} Sales+streaming figures based on certification alone.

== Other appearances ==
- The Acoustic Album (2006, Virgin)
