= Bernard Fanning =

Australian singer-songwriter (born 1969)

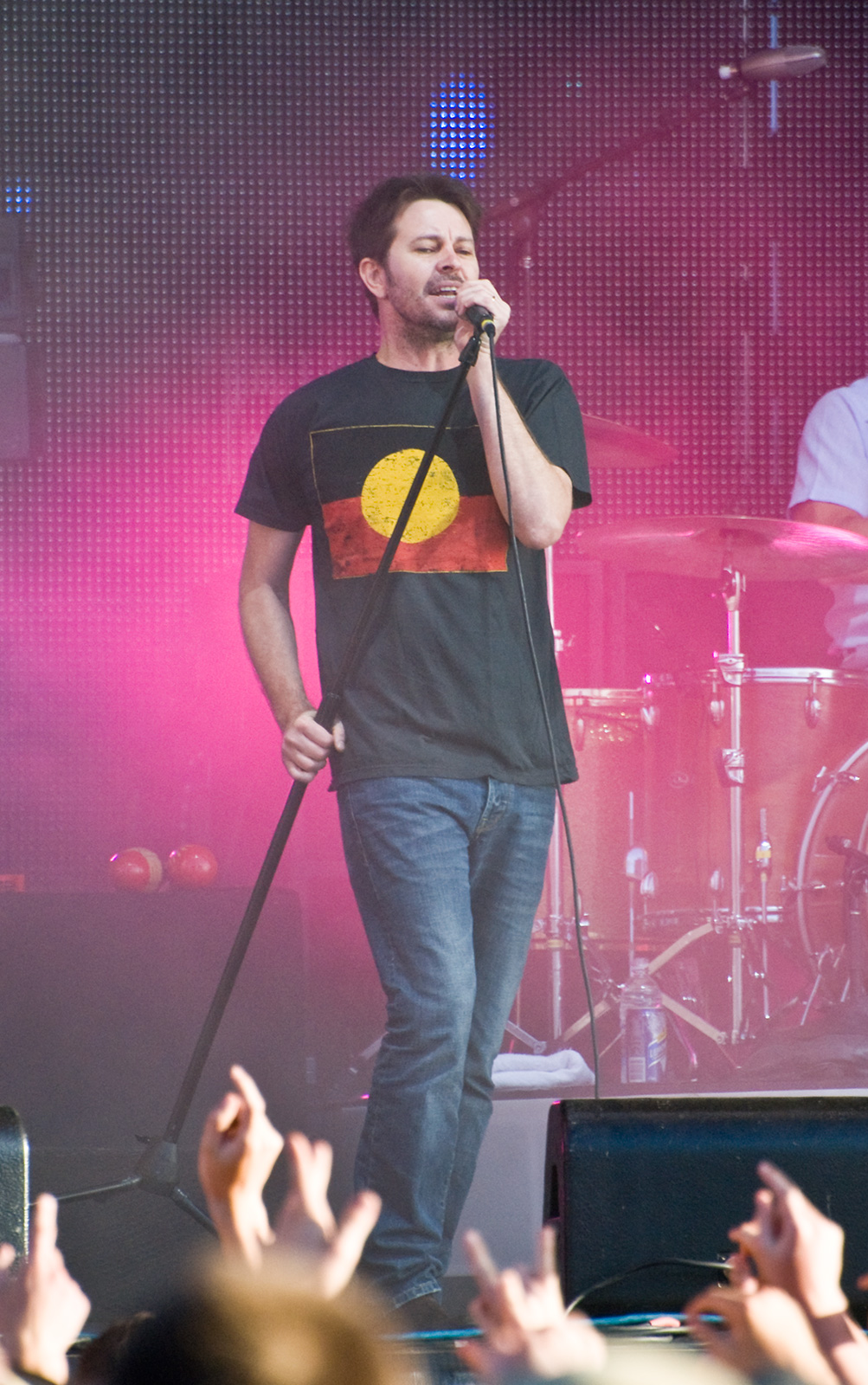
- Fanning performing in 2010

Background information
- Born: Bernard Joseph Fanning; 15 August 1969 (age 57); Brisbane, Queensland, Australia
- Genres: Alternative rock; blues; acoustic folk
- Occupations: Singer-songwriter; musician
- Instruments: Vocals; piano; guitar; percussion; harmonica
- Years active: 1989–present
- Labels: Dew Process; Universal; Lost Highway
- Member of: Fanning Dempsey National Park
- Formerly of: Powderfinger
- Spouse: Andrea Moreno (2007–present)
- Website: bernardfanning.com

Bernard Joseph Fanning (born 15 August 1969) is an Australian musician and singer-songwriter. He is the lead vocalist of Queensland alternative rock band Powderfinger from its formation in 1989.

Born and raised in Toowong, Brisbane, Fanning received piano lessons from his mother at an early age. At the age of 15, while he attended St Joseph's College, Gregory Terrace, he began writing music. Upon graduating from Gregory Terrace, Fanning moved on to the University of Queensland, where he studied journalism briefly. He dropped out to pursue a music career, after meeting Ian Haug in an economics class. Fanning joined Haug, John Collins, and Steven Bishop, who had recently formed Powderfinger, and took the role of lead singer. After Bishop left and drummer Jon Coghill and guitarist Darren Middleton joined, the band released five studio albums in fifteen years and achieved mainstream success in Australia. During Powderfinger's hiatus in 2005, Fanning began his solo music career with the studio album Tea & Sympathy. Powderfinger reunited in 2007 and released two more albums before they disbanded in late 2010.

While Powderfinger's style focuses on alternative rock, Fanning's solo music is generally described as a mixture of blues and acoustic folk. He plays guitar, piano, keyboards, and harmonica both when performing solo and also with Powderfinger. Often speaking out against Australian political figures, Fanning has donated much of his time to philanthropic causes. He also advocates for Aboriginal justice in Australia.

== Early life ==
Fanning was born in Brisbane on 15 August 1969. He was raised with two brothers and a sister in an Irish Catholic family in the inner Brisbane suburb of Toowong. The death of Fanning's brother John from cancer would inspire Vulture Street's "Since You've Been Gone". Fanning's mother began teaching him to play piano as a young child, although his siblings were not interested in music.

Fanning attended St. Joseph's College, Gregory Terrace, and began writing his own music at the age of 15. Fanning has described these early works as "terrible", but notes that he enjoyed writing and arranging them. After graduating from Gregory Terrace, Fanning entered the University of Queensland to study journalism; however, he had equal interest in pursuing a music career, and left university at the age of 19 to do so.

== Music career ==
=== Powderfinger era (1989–2004) ===
Fanning first met Powderfinger guitarist Ian Haug in a University of Queensland economics class in 1989. Haug had recently formed Powderfinger with high school friends John Collins and Steven Bishop, who would become the band's foundational bass guitarist and drummer, respectively. Haug was the lead guitarist and lead singer. On discovering Fanning's singing abilities, Haug replaced himself with Fanning as lead singer and frontman. Haug stated that, "It was a big thing to convince the others that we needed a singer. They were like, 'You're OK,' and I was like, 'No I'm not. We can do better than that.'"

In 1992, current guitarist Darren Middleton was invited to join Powderfinger by Fanning and Haug, after they were impressed by his work in Brisbane band Pirate. Middleton accepted the offer and became the fifth member, joining Jon Coghill who had replaced Bishop as drummer. The line-up of Fanning, Middleton, Haug, Collins, and Coghill then remained unchanged.

Throughout the late 1990s, Powderfinger rose to prominence throughout Australia, receiving several accolades and achieving highly successful record and concert ticket sales. As the most vocal and prominent member of the band, the popularity of the group elevated Fanning as a powerful individual in the Australian music industry. In 2003, Fanning was called upon by film-maker Gregor Jordan to perform the folk song "Moreton Bay" (named after the bay in the Brisbane area) and his own original composition "Shelter for My Soul" in his film Ned Kelly. Fanning then enlisted Jordan to film Powderfinger's first live DVD, These Days: Live in Concert.

=== Solo venture (2004–2006) ===
On 31 October 2005, Fanning released his debut solo album entitled Tea & Sympathy. It debuted at number one on the Australian ARIA Albums chart and spent 58 weeks in the top 50. It peaked at number 11 during its 18-week stay on the New Zealand albums chart.

Tea & Sympathy included songs Fanning had written in his time with Powderfinger as well as new material written after the band went on hiatus. Most of the writing was done in what Fanning described as a "creative burst" between March and May 2005. Much of the inspiration for the work on the album came from Fanning's reaction to the death of his brother in 2002, and to the ending of a 12-year relationship with his girlfriend, Philippa Sison. Most of the album was recorded at Real World Studios with Tchad Blake in June 2005, except for "Not Finished Just Yet", "Believe", "Wash Me Clean", and "Hope & Validation", which were recorded at Fanning's Brisbane home. Fanning was supported by musicians Jerry Marotta, Keith Duffy, and John Bedggood, who also formed part of his live band. The album was developed in a relaxed manner, with Fanning stating, "We had a ball putting the songs together."

Three singles were released from the album. The most successful of these was the lead single, "Wish You Well", followed shortly by "Songbird". These releases were only sold as digital download singles. The album's third single, "Watch Over Me", was the only one to be released as a CD single and achieved minor success on the Australian singles chart. It entered the chart on 9 July 2006 at number 16 spending eight weeks in the top 50. On 26 January 2006, "Wish You Well" was voted number one for the 2005 Triple J Hottest 100. Following "Watch Over Me", Fanning digitally released a fourth single "Weekend of Mystery". It was not officially on the album but was included on the album available from the iTunes Store. Fanning took home the award for Best Video at the 2006 ARIA Awards for "Wish You Well".

On 2 December 2005, Fanning announced a nationwide Which Way Home Concert Tour, named after the song on the album of the same name. Fanning played seven shows between 25 February and 10 March 2006, in each of Australia's major capital cities. He was supported by Perth band The Panics and Brisbane singer Andrew Morris. He followed this with the Yesterday's Gone tour, announced on 11 August 2006, which concluded with Powderfinger re-uniting and returning to the recording studio. Fanning later said that while he enjoyed making Tea & Sympathy, "Powderfinger is my real job".

=== Powderfinger return (2007–2010) ===
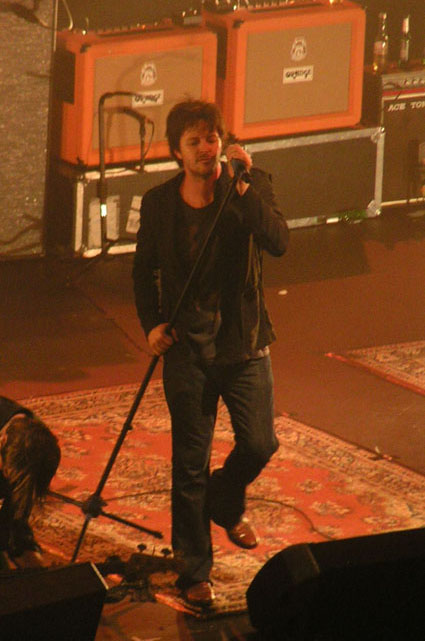
Fanning performing with Powderfinger at London's Hammersmith Apollo, on 6 December 2007

Throughout 2006, Fanning had hinted Powderfinger would end their hiatus and release a sixth studio album. Recorded in Los Angeles, Dream Days at the Hotel Existence was released on 2 June 2007. The title of the album came from a chapter of Brooklyn Follies by Paul Auster, a book that Fanning had read during recording. The album debuted at number one on the Australian ARIA Albums chart.

Powderfinger toured Australia and New Zealand with Silverchair on their Across the Great Divide tour in 2007. The tour's aim was to promote the efforts of Reconciliation Australia to reduce the 17-year life expectancy gap between Indigenous and Non-Indigenous Australians. Fanning said of the tour, "The idea is to show both bands are behind the idea of reconciliation."

=== Return to solo venture (2011–2023) ===
After the disbanding of Powderfinger, Fanning moved to Madrid for 18 months with his family, where he began writing for his next solo album before moving to Brisbane in 2013. Departures was released in June 2013, with the recording work done in Los Angeles, between leaving Spain and returning to Australia.

Fanning released his third studio album Civil Dusk on 5 August 2016. It was preceded by the single "Wasting Time". Civil Dusk is part one of a series of two albums, the second being Brutal Dawn, released on 26 May 2017.

=== Collaboration with Paul Dempsey (2024–present) ===
Fanning collaborated with Paul Dempsey on a project called Fanning Dempsey National Park. Their debut album, The Deluge, was released on 2 August 2024.

== Style, technique, and influences ==
Fanning has been described as having a strong vocal range when singing, but has said he is not highly confident in his voice. In a 1998 interview, Fanning said, "I don't think I have the perfect voice or anything", and said that delivering the song's message was more important than "showing off [his] chops". He said he was not interested in singing for the purpose of singing alone, but rather because he enjoyed getting the purpose of the song across. Fanning has said: "For me, writing songs comes from anywhere", drawing inspiration from his experiences.

In his work on Tea & Sympathy, Fanning referred to his inability to play guitar solos leading to different elements becoming a focus of the songs. In an interview, he said, "I wasn't relying on solos to be big features because I simply can't play them." Fanning explained that the songs' shorter length was due to not having "four other people" to back him up when producing independently.

Fanning has said his favourite band is The Beatles.

== Political and moral stances ==
For me, reconciliation is not about casting blame, financial compensation or bringing shame on anyone. It is about accepting there have been wrongdoings in the past that have left Aborigines here in a position of distinct disadvantage.

— Bernard Fanning

Fanning has said that although political messages may be common throughout his and Powderfinger's music, it is not his central focus when writing songs: "A balance has to be struck in a lot of ways, in the sense that primarily I'm a musician. I'm not a political commentator. So if I write a song that has political content, then hopefully that song is a good enough song to make it onto my record. And if it's not, then that's just a song that I've written. So I don't think it necessarily needs to be that you're definitively trying to make a political statement." He has said he has no interest in "doing a 'Peter Garrett'", referring to the Midnight Oil frontman who entered politics after a successful musical career.

On 8 July 2007, Fanning wrote a piece for Adelaide's Sunday Mail, describing his recent trip to Uluru. In the piece, he criticised those who climbed the rock, saying he was "appalled that kids were being taught to disrespect the wishes of Aboriginal people on their own land". Upon returning from Uluru, Fanning wrote "Black Tears", which "document[ed] a relationship gone wrong". In his piece, Fanning also criticised the 17-year life-expectancy gap between Aboriginal and non-Aboriginal Australians, and encouraged all to join a conversation on reconciliation.

Fanning takes a left-leaning political stance, although he claims he is not fond of discussing the issue. Rather, he attempts to discuss the issues through his songs. "I approach writing a song about something like [Aboriginal affairs] the same way I would approach writing a song about a relationship, because it's something that I feel strongly about." However, he has occasionally stated his views on social and political issues, giving The Dominion Post his stance on Aboriginal affairs in light of the Across the Great Divide tour:

The trial of the policeman [Senior Sergeant Chris Hurley] that was charged [over the death in custody of 36-year-old Palm Island man Mulrunji Doomadgee in 2004] has gone ahead and he was acquitted. In terms of that issue, that's out of the way, but the whole idea of Aboriginal people in custody dying is certainly not out of the way. And Aboriginal people being treated like shit in Australia is certainly not out of the way either.

== Personal life ==
Fanning has performed numerous philanthropic tasks independently and with Powderfinger. The band played at the 2005 WaveAid concert to raise money for victims of the 2004 Indian Ocean earthquake, and the Across the Great Divide tour in 2007 to promote the efforts of Reconciliation Australia. Fanning has contributed to charities, including A Just Australia and Youngcare Australia, and donates his time to youth detention centres in Brisbane running songwriting workshops. In an uncharacteristic outburst, Fanning once referred to fellow Australian artist Ben Lee as "a precocious little cunt", after Lee referred to himself as "the saviour of Australian music". Fanning later apologised for the comment.

Fanning married Andrea Moreno in February 2007 in Brisbane. The couple have a daughter and a son. Moreno is from Spain, where the two met while Fanning was writing and recording Tea & Sympathy in Europe. This relationship followed a twelve-year union Fanning had had with his previous girlfriend. It was this break-up (along with the then-recent death of his older brother) which influenced much of the lyrical content and sombre atmospheric mood of Tea & Sympathy. Through Moreno, Fanning has learned to speak some Spanish. Fanning and Moreno have performed together while Powderfinger was on hiatus and Fanning was touring as a solo artist.

Fanning is a supporter of cricket and National Rugby League club the Brisbane Broncos.

== Discography ==
=== Solo ===
- Tea & Sympathy (2005)
- Departures (2013)
- Civil Dusk (2016)
- Brutal Dawn (2017)

=== See also ===
- Powderfinger
- Fanning Dempsey National Park

== Awards and nominations ==
=== APRA Awards ===
The APRA Awards are presented annually from 1982 by the Australasian Performing Right Association (APRA).

Year	Nominee / work	Award	Result
2004	Powderfinger – Fanning, Jon Coghill, Ian Haug, Darren Middleton, John Collins	Songwriter of the Year	Won
2004	"On My Mind" – Fanning, Darren Middleton, John Collins, Ian Haug, Jonathan Coghill	Most Performed Australian Work	Nominated
2006	Bernard Fanning	Songwriter of the Year	Won
2007	"Songbird" – Fanning	Most Performed Blues & Roots Work	Won
2007	"Watch Over Me" – Fanning	Most Performed Blues & Roots Work	Nominated
2007	"Wish You Well" – Fanning	Most Performed Blues & Roots Work	Nominated
2008	"Lost and Running" – Jonathon Coghill, John Collins, Fanning, Ian Haug, Darren Middleton	Song of the Year	Nominated
2008	"Lost and Running" – Jonathon Coghill, John Collins, Fanning, Ian Haug, Darren Middleton	Most Played Australian Work	Nominated
2014	"Battleships" (Fanning)	Song of the Year	Shortlisted
2014	"Battleships" (Fanning)	Rock Work of the Year	Nominated
2014	"Tell Me How It Ends"	Rock Work of the Year	Nominated
2015	"Bittersweet" (Kasey Chambers) (Kasey Chambers and Bernard Fanning)	Song of the Year	Nominated
2018	"Isn't It a Pity"	Song of the Year	Shortlisted
2023	"Wish You Well" (Baker Boy featuring Bernard Fanning)	Song of the Year	Shortlisted
2023	"Wish You Well" (Baker Boy featuring Bernard Fanning)	Most Performed Hip Hop/ Rap Work of the Year	Nominated
2025	"Disconnect" by Fanning Dempsey National Park (Paul Dempsey / Bernard Fanning)	Song of the Year	Shortlisted

=== ARIA Music Awards ===
The ARIA Music Awards is an annual awards ceremony that recognises excellence, innovation, and achievement across all genres of the music of Australia. Fanning has won five awards.

Year	Nominee / work	Award	Result	Ref.
2006	Tea and Sympathy	Album of the Year	Won	
2006	Tea and Sympathy	Best Male Artist	Won	
2006	Tea and Sympathy	Highest Selling Album	Nominated	
2006	Tea and Sympathy	Best Blues and Roots Album	Nominated	
2006	"Watch Over Me"	Single of the Year	Nominated	
2006	"Wish You Well" (director Head Pictures)	Best Video	Won	
2006	Debaser for Tea and Sympathy	Best Cover Art	Won	
2016	Civil Dusk	Best Male Artist	Nominated	
2016	Civil Dusk	Best Adult Contemporary Album	Won	
2016	Nick DiDia for Civil Dusk	Engineer of the Year	Nominated	
2016	Karen Lynch for Civil Dusk	Best Cover Art	Nominated	
2017	Brutal Dawn	Best Adult Contemporary Album	Nominated	
2022	"Wish You Well " (Baker Boy featuring Bernard Fanning) (Macario De Souza)	Best Video	Nominated	

=== Queensland Music Awards ===
The Queensland Music Awards (previously known as Q Song Awards) are annual awards celebrating Queensland, Australia's brightest emerging artists and established legends. They commenced in 2006.

Year	Nominee / work	Award	Result (wins only)
2006	"Songbird"	Published song of the Year	Won
