= To Be Free (L D R U song) =

Single by L D R U

from the album Sizzlar
- Released: 24 February 2017
- Length: 3:15
- Label: Audiopaxx
- Songwriter(s): Drew Carmody; Alexander Burnett; Anita Blay
- Producer(s): Drew Carmody

L D R U singles chronology
"Next to You" (2016)	"To Be Free" (2017)	"Me" (2017)

Music video
- "To Be Free" on YouTube

"To Be Free" is a song recorded by Australian record producer L D R U, and was released in February 2017 as the third single from L D R U's debut studio album, Sizzlar (2017).

The song was certified gold in Australia in 2019.

== Track listing ==
- Digital download
1. "To Be Free" – 3:15
- Digital download
1. "To Be Free" (SNBRN remix) – 4:40

== Certification ==
Region	Certification	Certified units/sales
Australia (ARIA)	Gold	35,000^{‡}
^{‡} Sales+streaming figures based on certification alone.
