= Brutal Dawn =

Studio album by Bernard Fanning
- Released: 26 May 2017
- Studios: La Cueva Recording, Byron Bay, New South Wales
- Length: 39:20
- Labels: Dew Process; Universal Music Australia
- Producer: Nick Didia

Bernard Fanning chronology
Civil Dusk (2016)	Brutal Dawn (2017)

Singles from Brutal Dawn
- 1. "Isn't It a Pity" Released: April 27th 2017

Brutal Dawn is the fourth solo album by Australian musician Bernard Fanning. The album was announced in April 2017 and released on 26 May 2017.

In an interview with Scenestr, Fanning said "I think memories are the best version that suit you most. So, Brutal Dawn is spinning that around and inspecting it, deciding whether that's the case or not. The album also looks at the ideas of renewal and revitalising."

At the ARIA Music Awards of 2017, the album was nominated for Best Adult Contemporary Album.

== Reception ==
Professional ratings
Review scores
Source	Rating
The Music	4/5 stars

Matt O'Neill from The Music said "Across the record, there's an unpredictable air to the album's instrumental arrangements that proves entrancing." O'Neill called the album "a step in the right direction."

Aus Music Scene said "Throughout the album, it's difficult to tell how much of the album is crafted by Fanning's innate storytelling ability and how much of the narratives find parallels with his own trials" and adding "Fanning continues to transcend his previous highlights."

Beat Magazine said "The album sees Fanning dabbling with acoustic and electric elements, with an array of instruments working to develop intricate melodies." They concluded the review saying, "Throughout the album, Fanning displays honesty and rawness, resulting in evocative and emotionally driven tracks."

== Track listing ==
1. "Shed My Skin" - 4:44
2. "How Many Times?" - 4:18
3. "America (Glamour and Prestige)" - 3:07
4. "Isn't It a Pity" - 3:42
5. "Say You're Mine" - 3:51
6. "Somewhere Along the Way" - 3:05
7. "In the Ten Years Gone" - 4:38
8. "No Name Lane" - 2:40
9. "Fighting for Air" - 3:19
10. "Letter from a Distant Shore" - 5:57

== Charts ==
=== Weekly charts ===
Chart (2017)	Peak position
Australian Albums (ARIA)	2

=== Year-end charts ===
Chart (2017)	Position
Australian Artist Albums (ARIA)	49
