= Civil Dusk =

Studio album by Bernard Fanning
- Released: 5 August 2016
- Recorded: January–July 2016
- Studios: La Cueva Recording, Byron Bay, New South Wales
- Genres: Alternative; acoustic folk
- Length: 39:15
- Labels: Dew Process; Universal Music Australia
- Producer: Nick DiDia

Bernard Fanning chronology
| Departures (2013) | Civil Dusk (2016) | Brutal Dawn (2017) |

Singles from Civil Dusk
- 1. "Wasting Time" Released: 2016; 2. "Reckless" Released: 2016; 3. "Sooner or Later" Released: 2016

Civil Dusk is the third solo album by Australian musician Bernard Fanning, a followup to his 2013 album Departures, and is the second album following the disbanding of Fanning's band Powderfinger in 2011. The album was released on 5 August 2016. The album signals Fanning's return to more of an acoustic folk sound, more akin to his first solo album, Tea & Sympathy, than the alternative rock sound of Departures. Civil Dusk is released as part one of a series of two albums, the second instalment, Brutal Dawn, was released on 26 May 2017. It won at the 2016 ARIA Music Awards for Best Adult Contemporary Album, it was also nominated for Best Male Artist, but lost to Flume for Skin.

== Background and production ==
The writing process for the album began towards the end of 2014, in northern New South Wales, ending approximately a year later in Madrid, Spain. Following Fanning's return to Australia in early 2016, he set about recording for Civil Dusk, alongside friend and producer Nick DiDia, at La Cueva Recording, a home recording studio that the two developed. Taking such an approach was a new experience for Fanning, used to recording in professional studios in comparison with the open-floor layout of the home studio. DiDia believes such a layout helped to make communication easier, enhancing the recording process.

The album places a particular focus on consequences and decisions, though Fanning states that it is not only coloured by his own experiences. On describing the album, Fanning says: "Sometimes, particular decisions appear to be the most sensible or realistic path to take. A civil, pragmatic compromise. But the passage of time reveals those decisions to have been flawed and to have far deeper and wide ranging consequences than predicted at the time. We all live with the consequences of our decisions but have daily things to attend to."

Within the scope of decisions, the album explores a number of issues—from "Belly of the Beast" exploring Fanning's belief that the state of politics is "just a failure at all levels across the globe", to ideas of loss and devotion in songs such as "Emerald Flame".

The album's name is drawn from a photography term, civil twilight, described by Fanning as "[talking] about the light in the sky when the sun has gone below the horizon, but you can still make out all the objects", a direct reference to the album's core theme of decisions, and their lasting consequences. The album's cover photography is by Karen Lynch of Leaf and Petal, the work of whom Fanning's wife discovered whilst browsing a Spanish Instagram site, which upon Fanning's inspection, he found to "[fit] perfectly with the lyrical themes."

Civil Dusk was mastered at Studios 301 in Alexandria, New South Wales by Leon Zervos.

== Touring and promotion ==
From October through to mid-November 2016, Fanning embarked on an Australian-wide tour, accompanied by Australian artists Dustin Tebbutt and Ainslie Wills. Concerts received generally favourable reviews - Bernard Zuel of The Sydney Morning Herald describing the atmosphere at Fanning's State Theatre show as "safe returns on a comfortable investment".

== Reception ==
Civil Dusk has received generally favourable reviews. It has been described by Rolling Stone Australia as Fanning "re-embracing an old honesty, reclaiming some of the identity that he shrugged – deliberately enough – when setting out alone", blending elements of Tea & Sympathy with the likes of Jackson Browne and Cat Stevens. Fanning's politically charged closer, "Belly Of The Beast" was described as "an intriguing cut perhaps best described in the form of a thought experiment: imagine if Cat Stevens had written Sympathy for the Devil."

However, The Music's Mac McNaughton described the album as having "produced a collection on which he sounds kinda bored, not knowing whether to kick around a country pub (on the half pissed 'What A Man Wants') or rocking out a horrible Status Quo pastiche (on 'Change Of Pace')", stating that "Civil Dusk's lyrical unrest is mesmerising, but unsure musical footing makes for a challenging listen."

The songs as a whole were seen as "a touch predictable" by Double J, with Fanning "not interested in trying to win you over", but as "surely the soundtrack to many dinner parties, road trips, backyard barbecues and quiet nights in the near future."

== Track listing ==
1. "Emerald Flame" – 4:32
2. "Wasting Time" – 3:15
3. "What a Man Wants" – 3:32
4. "Reckless" – 3:36
5. "Rush of Blood" – 4:00
6. "Change of Pace" – 3:22
7. "L.O.L.A." – 3:56
8. "Unpicking a Puzzle" – 3:35
9. "Sooner or Later" featuring Kasey Chambers – 3:31
10. "Belly of the Beast" – 5:56

== Charts ==
=== Weekly charts ===
| Chart (2016) | Peak position |
|---|---|
| Australian Albums (ARIA) | 2 |
| New Zealand Heatseekers Albums (RMNZ) | 5 |

=== Year-end charts ===
| Chart (2016) | Position |
|---|---|
| Australian Albums (ARIA) | 73 |
