= L D R U =

Australian DJ and producer

- Born: Drew Malcolm Carmody; 21 June 1993 (age 33); Manly, New South Wales, Australia
- Genre: Electronic dance pop
- Occupations: Producer, DJ
- Years active: 2013–present
- Label: Warner Music Australia

Drew Malcolm Carmody (born 21 June 1993), better known by his stage name L D R U, is an Australian DJ and music producer. His first single, "The Tropics", was released in 2013. L D R U is best known for the single "Keeping Score" featuring Paige IV. The track reached No. 14 on the Australian ARIA Charts and No. 22 on Triple J Hottest 100, 2015, and was nominated for a 2016 ARIA Award for Best Dance Release and for Breakthrough Artist. L D R U embarked on a capital cities tour of Australia in July 2016. His first studio album, Sizzlar, peaked at No. 66 on the ARIA Charts. The name L D R U derives from the phrase "left, down, right, up", a part of a cheat code used in the Grand Theft Auto series of games.

In October 2017, Drew supported The Chainsmokers on their Australian tour.

Carmody was previously a member of Carmada alongside Max Armata. He left the duo in 2018 to focus on his solo career.

In 2022, L D R U signed a worldwide deal with Warner Music Australia.

== Discography ==
=== Albums ===
Title	Album details	Peak chart positions
Title	Album details	AUS
Sizzlar	Released: 14 July 2017; Formats: CD, digital download, music streaming; Label: Sony Music Australia	66

=== Extended plays ===
List of EPs, with selected details
Title	Details
Ahead of Time	Released: 30 November 2023; Format: digital; Label: LRDU, Warner Music Australia

=== Singles ===
Title	Year	Peak chart positions	Certifications	Album
Title	Year	AUS	Certifications	Album
"The Tropics"	2013	—		Non-album singles
"The Only One" (with Yahtzel)	2014	—		Non-album singles
"Pop That"	2015	—		Non-album singles
"Keeping Score" (featuring Paige IV)	2015	14	ARIA: 3× Platinum	Sizzlar
"Next to You" (featuring Savoi)	2016	116	ARIA: Platinum	Sizzlar
"To Be Free"	2017	—	ARIA: Platinum	Sizzlar
"Me" (featuring BOI)	2017	—		Sizzlar
"Intimate" (with Elk Road)	2018	—		Non-album singles
"Can't Drive" (with Mammals)	2018	—		Non-album singles
"Lay You Down" (with Muki)	2019	—		Non-album singles
"Ruler" (with Boo Seeka)	2019	—		Non-album singles
"Be There"	2022	—		Non-album singles
"Let You Go"	2022	—		Non-album singles
"Ride Through"	2022	—		Non-album singles
"Base Camp"	2022	—		Non-album singles
"The Excuse"	2022	—		Non-album singles
"Alone Again" (featuring Peptalk)	2023	—		Non-album singles
"Righteous Places" (featuring Cristina Lizzul)	2023	—		Non-album singles
"Spring" (with Fitch featuring Riverine)	2023	—		Non-album singles
"Dreamy"	2023	—		Ahead of Time

== Awards and nominations ==
=== ARIA Music Awards ===
Year	Nominee / work	Award	Result
2016	"Keeping Score" (featuring Paige IV)	Best Dance Release	Nominated
2016	"Keeping Score" (featuring Paige IV)	Breakthrough Artist – Release	Nominated
2016	"Keeping Score" (featuring Paige IV)	Song of the Year	Nominated
