= Watch Over Me (song) =

Single by Bernard Fanning

from the album Tea & Sympathy
- Released: 26 June 2006
- Genre: Rock
- Length: 4:33
- Label: Dew Process
- Songwriter: Bernard Fanning

Bernard Fanning singles chronology
"Songbird" (2005)	"Watch Over Me" (2006)	"Weekend of Mystery" (2006)

"Watch Over Me" is the third single from Australian rock singer-songwriter, Bernard Fanning's solo debut album Tea & Sympathy, released in June 2006. Fanning has said in the past that the song had been inspired by the music played at the funeral of Pope John Paul II. It reached No. 16 on the ARIA Singles Chart.

== Track listing ==
1. "Watch Over Me"
2. "For You and I"
3. "Not Finished Just Yet" (Max Sessions Live)

== Charts ==
Chart (2006)	Peak position
Australia (ARIA)	16

== Certifications ==
Certifications for "Watch Over Me"
Region	Certification	Certified units/sales
Australia (ARIA)	Platinum	70,000^{‡}
^{‡} Sales+streaming figures based on certification alone.
