= Departures (album) =

Studio album by Bernard Fanning
- Released: 7 June 2013
- Genres: Alternative rock, country-folk
- Length: 39:34
- Label: Dew Process

Bernard Fanning chronology
Tea & Sympathy (2005)	Departures (2013)	Civil Dusk (2016)

Singles from Departures
- 1. "Battleships" Released: 2013; 2. "Tell Me How It Ends" Released: 2013

Departures is the second solo album by Australian musician Bernard Fanning, a follow-up to his 2005 album Tea & Sympathy, and the first since Fanning's band Powderfinger was disbanded in 2011. The album was released on 7 June 2013. The album heralds a departure from Fanning's debut 2005 effort of folk and roots in favour of a rock sound, more akin to his Powderfinger origins.

== Commercial performance ==
Departures debuted at number one on the ARIA Albums Chart dated 17 June 2013, becoming Fanning's second number-one album as a solo artist.

== Track listing ==
1. "Tell Me How It Ends" – 3:41
2. "Limbo Stick" – 3:53
3. "Battleships" – 3:10
4. "Grow Around You" – 4:20
5. "Drake" – 3:48
6. "Call You Home" – 4:51
7. "Departures (Blue Toowong Skies)" – 4:20
8. "Zero Sum Game" – 4:07
9. "Here Comes the Sadist" – 3:35
10. "Inside Track" – 3:49
11. "Ghosts" (retail bonus track) – 3:58
12. "Come Down On Your Side" – 3:27 (iTunes bonus track)

== Charts ==
Chart (2013)	Peak position
Australian Albums (ARIA)	1

== Certifications ==
Region	Certification	Certified units/sales
Australia (ARIA)	Gold	35,000^{^}
^{^} Shipments figures based on certification alone.

== See also ==
- List of number-one albums of 2013 (Australia)
