= Outlier (album) =

Studio album by Twelve Foot Ninja
- Released: 26 August 2016
- Genre: Alternative metal; funk metal; avant-garde metal; djent
- Length: 38:18
- Label: Volkanik Music
- Producer: Steve "Stevic" MacKay

Twelve Foot Ninja chronology
| Silent Machine (2012) | Outlier (2016) | Vengeance (2021) |

Outlier is the second studio album by the Australian alternative metal band Twelve Foot Ninja. It was released on 26 August 2016 and contains ten tracks, with one bonus track. The album entered the ARIA Albums Chart at #6 during its first week of release.

== Critical reception ==
Professional ratings
Review scores
| Source | Rating |
|---|---|
| New-Transcendence | 9.5/10 stars |
| Kill Your Stereo | 85/100 |
| Readjunk.com | 4.5/5 stars |
| Louder Sound | 4/5 stars |
| Heavy Mag | (very favourable) |
| Metal Injection | 8.5/10 stars |
| Wall of Sound | 9.5/10 stars |
| The Circle Pit | 9.5/10 stars |
| Damnation Magazine | 5/5 stars |

Outlier received critical acclaim on release. Carl Neumann of Heavy magazine called the album "superb" and wrote. "Twelve Foot Ninja are truly masters of incorporating elements into heavy music that would otherwise just sound ridiculous, and Outlier is a shining example of heavy metal fusion done right."

== Track listing ==
| No. | Title | Length |
|---|---|---|
| 1. | "One Hand Killing" | 4:29 |
| 2. | "Sick" | 3:37 |
| 3. | "Invincible" | 3:42 |
| 4. | "Oxygen" | 4:24 |
| 5. | "Collateral" | 4:03 |
| 6. | "Post Mortem" | 3:38 |
| 7. | "Point of You" | 3:35 |
| 8. | "Monsoon" | 3:18 |
| 9. | "Adios" | 3:31 |
| 10. | "Dig for Bones" | 4:01 |

Vinyl edition bonus track
| No. | Title | Length |
|---|---|---|
| 11. | "Red" | 3:20 |
| Total length: | | 38:18 |

== Personnel ==
- Kin Etik – lead vocals
- Steve "Stevic" MacKay – lead guitar
- Rohan Hayes – rhythm guitar, backing vocals
- Damon McKinnon – bass
- Shane "Russ" Russell – drums

Additional musicians:

- Ben Grayson - keyboards on tracks 1 & 7
- Dorian West - horns on track 7
- Sam Evans - tablas on track 8
- Lana Rita Sayah - backing vocals on track 3
- Sachi MacKay - experimental vocals on track 10
- Mr. Bill - IDM production on track 8
- Remi Gallego - matrix production on track 2
- Keith Draws - art direction, illustration
- Reuben Bhattacharya - graphic design, album layout

== Charts ==
| Chart (2016) | Peak position |
|---|---|
| Australian Albums (ARIA) | 6 |
