= Tea & Sympathy (album) =

Studio album by Bernard Fanning
- Released: 31 October 2005
- Recorded: May – July 2005
- Studios: Real World Studios, Bath, England; Leafy Bug Studios, Brisbane, Australia
- Genres: Alternative rock; country-folk
- Length: 46:41
- Label: Dew Process
- Producers: Tchad Blake; Bernard Fanning

Bernard Fanning chronology
Tea & Sympathy (2005)	Departures (2013)

Singles from Tea & Sympathy
- 1. "Wish You Well" Released: 2005; 2. "Songbird" Released: 2005; 3. "Watch Over Me" Released: 26 June 2006; 4. "Weekend of Mystery" Released: 15 August 2006

Tea & Sympathy is the debut solo album by Australian musician Bernard Fanning. It was released on 31 October 2005, by Dew Process records while Powderfinger—Fanning's main band—were on hiatus. Contrary to Powderfinger's usual alternative style, the album blends alternative and country-folk music. Most of the record was written after the cancer-related death of his brother in 2002. His brother's death coincided with the end of Fanning's twelve-year relationship with his partner, and both events were instrumental in his move away from his typically political and socially lyrical subject matter.

Fanning recorded four songs at his home studio in Brisbane and the rest at Real World Studios near Bath, England. Fanning worked with producer Tchad Blake in both sessions. To support the album's release Fanning toured Australia twice and performed across North America and the UK.

"Tea & Sympathy" topped the Australian Recording Industry Association (ARIA) albums chart and won three awards at the 2006 ARIA Awards, as well as an APRA Award.

At the J Award of 2005, the album was nominated for Australian Album of the Year.

== Background and production ==
After the 2004 release of Fingerprints: The Best of Powderfinger, 1994–2000, Powderfinger took a hiatus, and several members played in the side projects Drag and The Predators. Fanning decided to work independently and acted on direction he felt unable to explore as a member of Powderfinger. Some of his inspiration was derived from a will to see if he was capable of recording a solo album, considering what he viewed as his limited guitar playing abilities; compared to bandmates Darren Middleton and Ian Haug. The distance from the band, coupled with the more relaxed writing process for Tea & Sympathy helped Fanning to unwind from the stress left over from 10 years working recording and touring with Powderfinger.

Fanning wanted to create a politically oriented album with which he could attack then Prime Minister of Australia John Howard, following Howard's 2004 election victory over Mark Latham. However, the death of Fanning's brother from cancer in 2002, coupled with the end of a twelve-year relationship saw him steer the album in a different direction. Fanning explained that after going through "a pretty weird time in the past twelve months", he did not intend to talk about his experiences, but to express them through music. The motivation for some songs came from the 2005 Big Day Out; disappointment with the antisocial nature of the event and the heavy metal music played spurred him to "make music that was the opposite of that".

Fanning worked with producer Tchad Blake and was funded by record label Dew Process. Sessions for the album began in February 2005 when Fanning and several other musicians recorded tracks at Fanning's Brisbane studio, Leafy Bug. Four of these—"Not Finished Just Yet", "Believe", "Wash Me Clean", and "Hope & Validation"—appeared on the album after being mixed by Blake. The other tracks were recorded and mixed at Real World Studios near Bath, England. In Bath, Fanning worked with musicians including Jerry Marotta, Keith Duffy, and John Bedggood. While writing Fanning listened to music of guitarists Lightning Hopkins, Tom Petty, and singer-songwriter Gillian Welch, who all influenced his work. "I'd love to play guitar like that, but I simply don't have the skill to do it", said Fanning of Hopkins' work.

The album's title comes from a saying which Fanning explained to The Age as "you offer someone tea and sympathy, you sit down with them, have a cup of tea and you just talk." He noted that there is a credit on an album by The Rolling Stones for the provision of "tea and sympathy". The album cover photography and album inlay photography is by Ami Barwell

== Touring and promotion ==
Fanning toured much of Australia to support Tea & Sympathy. Prior to the launch of two major tours, Fanning held a number of low-key album launch shows. These drew praise from critics—Time Off's Ben Preece reported, "The chemistry between the Powderfinger frontman and his band (nicknamed The Gap Jazz School Choir) is excellent and their constant in-between song banter is hilarious. Then, of course, there’s the music." He commended the multiple genre changes during the 90-minute performance, as well as Fanning's vocal showcase.

The Which Way Home? tour, named after the album's sixth track, was announced on 2 December 2005, and lasted from through February to March 2006. Fanning performed in Sydney, Canberra, Adelaide, Melbourne, Hobart, Perth and Brisbane. He was joined on tour by Perth band The Panics and Brisbane singer Andrew Morris. On 11 August, Fanning announced that tours across the United States and Canada would follow the album's 8 August North American release. An 11 September UK release was also announced with Dew Process revealing that numerous London shows had already been sold out.

Performances in London attracted much expatriate support; Fanning joked, "I think I have about 14 English fans". The performances were received positively; musicOMH's Barnaby Smith rated his 4 September showing at London's Arts Theatre four stars, commenting on Powderfinger-esque "loud, anthemic, guitar-driven rock in a '70s vein", and praising Fanning's use of the piano and guitar as part of his performance, as well as his dedicating the song "Give It All Up" to the recently deceased Steve Irwin.

== Album and single releases ==
"Wish You Well"
The optimistic chorus of "Wish You Well" was written by Fanning during an "unusually positive frame of mind".

Tea & Sympathy was released in Australia on 31 October 2005, in North America on 11 August 2006, and in the United Kingdom on 18 September 2006. The album peaked at number one on Australia's ARIA Albums Chart and number 11 on New Zealand's RIANZ Albums Chart. The Australian Record Industry Association has since certified Tea & Sympathy platinum five times over for sales in excess of 350,000 units.

"Wish You Well" was the first single released from the album. Although it did not chart in Australia, it peaked at number 24 in New Zealand, and topped the Triple J Hottest 100, 2005. The inspiration for the song came to Fanning when he woke one morning, "and 'Wish You Well' just arrived in a splurge. There were swallows flying around. I was in an unusually positive frame of mind." musicOMH's Barnaby Smith described "Wish You Well" as reminiscent of Daryl Braithwaite and a "basic song with [a] catchy chorus you might sing round a campfire". The online release "Songbird" was the album's second single. The song was broadly popular, and contributed to Fanning's winning "Songwriter of the Year" at the 2006 APRA Awards. "Songbird" won "Most Performed Blues and Roots Work" at the 2007 ceremony and was nominated for "Most Performed Australian Work". The single did not appear on the ARIA Singles Chart, but peaked at number 11 on the Australian national airplay charts. It also reached number 14 on the Triple J Hottest 100, 2005.

"Watch Over Me" was released as the final single on 24 June 2006. All proceeds from the single were passed on to Australian charity Youngcare. Fanning also toured with Kasey Chambers, again giving proceeds to the charity. Fanning said that "the aim of this show and the single release is to raise money for Youngcare but also to raise awareness of the terrible situation that these young people face", referring to children forced to live in aged facilities. "Watch Over Me" spent eight weeks on the ARIA Singles Chart, where it peaked at number 16. The song was performed by Fanning, Chambers, and Clare Bowditch at the 2006 ARIA Awards.

== Music and lyrics ==
I realised about three songs into writing it how insulting that was to people who write country music ... someone like me trying to make a country record.

—Bernard Fanning
On why he abandoned his plan to make a purely country record.

The country-folk-alternative blend on Tea & Sympathy formed a stark contrast to Powderfinger's last work, Vulture Street—the band's heaviest work yet. Initially intended to be a purely country album, Fanning abandoned the prospect shortly into the writing phase because he did not think he was able to make music of the quality he had expected. He thus turned to an amalgamation of country, rock, and folk elements. Fanning considered Powderfinger music to "always [have] a song that just kind of grabs you" but doubted his album had similar elements; instead he focused on an album that as a whole would move the listener. The album is primarily acoustic—"Which Way Home?" a notable exception—and features fiddles and mandolins for backing music. The album centres on themes of love, in the context of the recent end to Fanning's relationship. Only three songs on the album exceed four minutes, while four are less than three minutes long; Fanning was critical of the "convention that a song should go on for 3 [and a half], four minutes".

Opening track "Thrill is Gone" was written by Fanning as a joke about a hypothetical ending in his relation with rock music. The song is reminiscent of 70s country/folk Led Zeppelin, setting the mood for the rest of the album. Numerous songs on the album are influenced by Neil and Tim Finn; "Believe", "Sleeping Rough", "The Strangest Thing", and "Wish You Well" all have comparisons drawn to the brothers. "Not Finished Just Yet" and "Songbird", meanwhile, are reminiscent of Neil Young—a long-term Powderfinger influence. "Wish You Well", "Not Finished Just Yet", and "Yesterday's Gone" were noted as examples of "Fanning frankly prodding and probing matters of the heart" by dB.

On "Wash Me Clean", Fanning aimed to imitate Nick Drake; songs that "you to sleep because they've got so much air and space in them". This came as a contrast to the louder, more vocal Powderfinger work he was accustomed to. "Watch Over Me", released and promoted in support of Australian charity Youngcare, was one of the slowest and most emotional songs on the album—The Age's Daniel Ziffer described it as "emotionally wrenching". It was written alongside "Believe" following the 2005 Big Day Out. Sometimes construed as a relationships-based song, "Watch Over Me" was written by Fanning after watching Pope John Paul II's funeral. "Down To The River" was equally slow in portions, mixed in with sections of "searing, heart-rending pleading"—praised as the best song Fanning had written by musicOMH's Barnaby Smith.

== Reception ==
Professional ratings
Review scores
Source	Rating
The Age	3/5 stars
Australian Broadcasting Corporation	(positive)
AllMusic	3.5/5 stars
BBC	3/5 stars
musicOMH	3/5 stars

Tea & Sympathy was awarded "Best Cover Art" and "Album of the Year" at the 2006 ARIA Music Awards; it was also nominated for "Best Blues & Roots Album" and "Highest Selling Album". "Wish You Well" won "Best Video", while "Watch Over Me" was nominated for "Single of the Year". "Wish You Well" topped the Triple J Hottest 100, 2005, and was the most broadcast song on Australian radio in 2006. Fanning won "Best Male Artist" for his work on the album, and as part of his acceptance speech challenged fellow Australian musicians to write protest songs—something they had been criticised for a lack of by ARIA Hall of Fame inductee Rob Hirst. Tea & Sympathy was nominated for the inaugural J Award in 2005, and Fanning won "Songwriter of the Year" at the 2006 APRA Awards. MTV Australia named Tea & Sympathy "Album of the Year" at its 2006 Video Music Awards.

Tea & Sympathy's critical reception was moderate. It was generally seen as being less entertaining than Fanning's Powderfinger work—The Age said Powderfinger were a "rock band ingrained in the national psyche" like Cold Chisel, but that Tea & Sympathy showed little resemblance to Cold Chisel frontman Jimmy Barnes's groundbreaking debut album, Bodyswerve. Barnaby Smith of musicOMH said the album was not "a work to suggest [Fanning's] solo career might better Powderfinger". The BBC's Jenna Bachelor wrote that the album is "pleasant enough without pulling up any trees".

Despite Fanning's claims he could not write a country song, the Australian Broadcasting Corporation (ABC) and BBC drew comparisons to Neil Young and supergroup Crosby, Stills, Nash & Young. The ABC said Tea & Sympathy resembled the band's work, "though without the hippy, drippy lyrics", while the BBC observed a "harmony porch style sound" highly similar to that of Young. Allmusic wrote that "Fanning's influences are strictly old school", noting Manassas' self-titled album and Elton John's Tumbleweed Connection as similar.

Fanning's vocals drew praise; Allmusic's Andy Whitman said he was a "fine, soulful singer" whose "vocal presence alone merits attention". Other aspects of the album, though, were seen in a more negative light. musicOMH said songs like "Wash Me Clean" "simply lack a strong enough melody", while the BBC wrote that Fanning "might have to be happy with 'straight in at 101,' in the UK" despite topping the ARIA Albums Chart. The Age concluded its review by calling Tea & Sympathy "a low-key but worthy personal offering".

In October 2010, Tea & Sympathy (2005) was listed in the book, 100 Best Australian Albums.

== Track listing ==
1. "Thrill Is Gone" – 3:11
2. "Wish You Well" – 2:31
3. "Not Finished Just Yet" – 3:17
4. "Songbird" – 2:36
5. "Believe" – 3:07
6. "Which Way Home?" – 3:21
7. "Wash Me Clean" – 2:37
8. "Hope & Validation" – 3:09
9. "Sleeping Rough" – 4:34
10. "The Strangest Thing" – 3:14
11. "Further Down the Road" – 4:41
12. "Down to the River" – 4:13
13. "Yesterday's Gone" – 2:34
14. "Watch Over Me" – 3:31
15. "Weekend of Mystery" (iTunes bonus release) – 3:26

20th anniversary bonus disc

1. "For You and I"
2. "Steady Job" (demo)
3. "Watch Over Me" (featuring Kasey Chambers & Clare Bowditch)
4. "Songbird" (acoustic)
5. "Believe" (performed by The Paper Kites)
6. "Weekend of Mystery"
7. "Thrill Is Gone" (acoustic)
8. "What a Fool I've Been"
9. "Songbird" (performed by Jem & Troy Cassar-Daley)
10. "Shelter for My Soul"

== Personnel ==
=== UK sessions ===
Tracks 1, 2, 4, 6 and 9–14.

- Bernard Fanning – guitars and vocals
- Jerry Marotta – drums and percussion
- Keith Duffy – bass guitar
- John Bedggood – mandolin, fiddle, strings, keyboards and backing vocals
- Tchad Blake – lap steel guitar
- Ben Quinn – backing vocals
- Stu Miller – backing vocals

=== Australian sessions ===
Tracks 3, 5, 7 and 8.

- Bernard Fanning – guitars and vocals
- Duane Billing – drums and percussion
- Matt Engelbrecht – bass guitar and lead guitar
- Chris Bosley – bass guitar

=== Production ===
- Bernard Fanning – producer
- Tchad Blake – producer, engineer and mixer
  (Real World Studios, Box, UK)
- Claire Lewis – assistant engineer
  (Real World Studios, Box, UK)
- Mark McElligott – engineer and mixer
  (Leafy Bug Studios, Brisbane, Australia)

== Charts and certifications ==
=== Weekly charts ===
Chart (2005)	Peak position
Australian Albums (ARIA)	1
New Zealand Albums (RMNZ)	11

=== Year-end charts ===
Chart	Year	Position
Australian Albums (ARIA)	2005	24
Australian Albums (ARIA)	2006	13

=== Decade-end chart ===
Chart (2000–2009)	Position
Australian Albums (ARIA)	50

== Certifications ==
Region	Certification	Certified units/sales
Australia (ARIA)	6× Platinum	420,000^{‡}
^{‡} Sales+streaming figures based on certification alone.
