= State of the Art (Hilltop Hoods album) =

Studio album by Hilltop Hoods
- Released: 12 June 2009
- Genre: Australian hip hop
- Length: 46:16
- Label: Golden Era
- Producer: Matthew Lambert

Hilltop Hoods chronology
The Hard Road: Restrung (2007)	State of the Art (2009)	Drinking From the Sun (2012)

Singles from State of the Art
- 1. "Chase That Feeling" Released: 8 May 2009; 2. "Still Standing" Released: 18 September 2009; 3. "The Light You Burned" Released: 29 December 2009

Professional ratings
Review scores
Source	Rating
AllMusic	3.5/5 stars

State of the Art is the fifth studio album by Australian hip hop trio Hilltop Hoods, released on 12 June 2009, by Golden Era Records.

At the ARIA Music Awards of 2009, the album won Best Urban Album while Suffa won Engineer of the Year for this release.

At the J Awards of 2009, the album was nominated for Australian Album of the Year.

== Background ==
State of the Art is the first release by their newly founded record label, Golden Era Records. It is the first release to be made by the group since their ARIA Award winning album, The Hard Road, in 2006, and its remix album, The Hard Road: Restrung, which was released in 2007. These albums were both released under their previous label Obese Records. The first track on the album, 'The Return' is about how long it had been since they last released an album.

The album contains 3 singles, first single "Chase That Feeling", was released on 8 May 2009. The other two singles "Still Standing" and "The Light You Burned" were released with the album on 12 June 2009, then re-released with remix, instrumental and radio edited versions of the songs a few months after their initial release. There are 12 tracks in the album, and 2 extra bonus tracks. Several tracks contain features from Trials, Pharoahe Monch, and several members of the Adelaide Symphony Orchestra. Other acts that also appear on the album are Briggs, Funkoars and Vents, who are also signed to Golden Era Records and appear on the iTunes bonus track 'Rent Week'.

The production for State of the Art was mainly held by Suffa, with "She's So Ugly" and "Classic Example" being produced by Pokerbeats and DJ Nu-Mark, respectively. As in previous albums, Suffa’s eclectic sampling pulls from various genres, including rock, jazz, soul, funk, and psychedelic pop, while blending a broad range of hip-hop subgenres like New York Boom Bap, Mafioso, and Horrorcore.

The album debuted at number one on the Australian ARIA Charts and has been certified double platinum by the Australian Recording Industry Association (ARIA) for shipments exceeding 140,000 copies. In 2020 the album was certified triple platinum after shipments of State of the Art exceeded 210, 000 copies.

== Artwork ==
State of the Art is the 5th studio album, and 13th release to feature the character of 'Armageddon' on the cover, a creation of Hilltop Hoods to adorn their albums. The trio consider him to be the 4th member of the band, and said they were inspired in their youth to create him by Iron Maiden's popular character 'Eddie'.

The illustration for the album and associated releases was provided by John Engelhardt, and graphic design provided by April77 Creative. Associated Photography release with the album was created by Mathematics & Conan Whitehouse, and image post production services were provided by Ben Funnel.

== Sampling ==
State of the Art, like many Hilltop Hoods releases, feature sounds samples from a variety of sources.

Song	Samples used in the song
The Return	Come With Your Lady- Rare Earth (1972) Clan in Da Front- Wu-Tang Clan (1993) Big Boy Game- M.O.P. (2005) J.Beez Comin' Through- Jungle Brothers (1989) Come on Down- Big Daddy Kane ft. Q-Tip and Busta Rhymes (1991) Sound of Da Police- KRS-One (1993)
Super Official	Buttermilk Bottom- The Spirit of Atlanta (1973) Success- Fat Joe (1995)
Chase That Feeling	Pass the Word- The Mad Lads (1973)
She's So Ugly	Melancholy Baby- Sapphire Thinkers (1969) Ugly Broad- The Nine Lives of Fritz the Cat (Film, 1974)
Still Standing	Your Teeth in My Neck- Scientist (1981) I'm Still Standing- Elton John (1983) Mama Said Knock You Out- LL Cool J (1990)
Classic Example	The Game- Common (2007) The Infamous Date Rape- A Tribe Called Quest (1991)
Chris Farley	What a Great Night- Hilltop Hoods (2006)
The Light You Burned	Hot Line Conversation- Giant Crab (1986) Thin Line- Jurassic 5 ft. Nelly Furtado (2002) Hate Me Now- Nas ft. Puff Daddy (1999)
Parade of the Dead	Then- Yes (1970) Nowhere to Run, Nowhere to Hide- Gravediggaz ft. Kurious (1994)
Last Confession	A Possible Projection of the Future- Al Kooper (1972)
Hilltoppa	Allure- Jay-Z (2003)
Fifty in FIve	Twenty Ten- Tinkerbells Fairydust (1986) Singing in the Morning- Ohio Players (1971)
Rent Week	Brother- Emilio Santiago (1975) Show Money- Funkoars (2008)

'She's So Ugly' was sampled in Briggs' 2011 track 'Let it Burn'.

== Reception ==
State of the Art spent two weeks at number one in the ARIA charts after it was released on 12 June 2009. After dropping from the number one spot, State of the Art spent a total of 28 weeks within the ARIA top 50 albums Charts. After its initial 21 week streak, the album left the top 50 for seven weeks, then placed on and off over the next five weeks. The album took an almost 10-year hiatus from the top 50 album charts, but returned for a single week at position #41 in December 2019.

State of the Art was also number one on the Weekly Top Urban Album Chart for three weeks (22 June – 6 July). It finished at number 12 in the Yearly ARIA Top 25 Albums Chart, the band's first album to be included in this chart. The album was certified double platinum in 2010 for shipping 140,000 units and ended up being certified triple platinum in 2020.

"Chase That Feeling", the first single from the album, was released on the 5 May and peaked at number eight in the weekly ARIA top 50 Singles Charts. It remained in the top 50 for 28 weeks. "Still Standing", the second single from State of the Art, and was released with the album on 12 June 2009. It peaked at number 34 in the ARIA Top Weekly Singles Charts, and spent six weeks in the top 50.

'Chase That Feeling' came in at number 3 in Triple J's Hottest 100, behind 'Little Lion Man' by Mumford and Sons (number 1) and 'Parle Vous Francais' by Art vs. Science (number 2). 'Still Standing' placed at 37, making them one of 23 artist to receive at least 2 songs nominations in the 100. 'Chase That Feeling' was also selected with 41 other songs from the 100 to be released in Triple j Hottest 100 Volume 17 CD, representing the countdown of that year. The song features as track 6 in disc 1 of the CD release.

When 'Chase That Feeling' placed 3rd, they tied the record for highest placed hip hop song in the hottest 100 with 3 other songs. Their own song 'The Hard Road' placed 3rd in 2006, as did the Gorillaz 'Feel Good Inc.' in 2005, and Coolio's 'Gangsta's Paradise' in 1995. This tied record was broken in 2012 when 'Thrift Shop' by Macklemore and Ryan Lewis featuring Wanz placed number 1.

== Track listing ==
All tracks are written by Hilltop Hoods.

No.	Title	Length
1.	"The Return"	3:57
2.	"Super Official"	4:10
3.	"Chase That Feeling"	3:29
4.	"She's So Ugly"	3:37
5.	"Still Standing"	3:31
6.	"Classic Example" (featuring Pharoahe Monch)	3:11
7.	"Chris Farley"	3:38
8.	"The Light You Burned" (featuring Trials)	4:19
9.	"Parade of the Dead"	3:35
10.	"Last Confession"	3:50
11.	"Hillatoppa"	3:26
12.	"Fifty in Five"	5:33

iTunes bonus track
No.	Title	Length
13.	"Rent Week" (featuring Funkoars, Vents and Briggs)	3:48

JB Hi-Fi pre-order bonus track
No.	Title	Length
13.	"State of the Art" (Instrumental)	3:06

== Touring ==
Hilltop Hoods promoted their album with their 'State of the Art' tour, with support act Canadian hip hop artist Classified, and Australian rapper Briggs.

Shows in the 'State of the Art' tour
Venue	City	Audience	Date
Enmore Theatre	Sydney, NSW	All ages	Saturday 18 July 2009
Capitol	Perth, WA	Over 18	Thursday 23 July 2009
Hifi Bar	Brisbane, QLD	Over 18	Friday 24 July 2009
Grandstand Hall	Hobart, TAS	Over 18	Thursday 30 July 2009
Palace Theatre, Melbourne	Melbourne VIC	Over 18	Friday 31 July 2009
Thebarton Theatre	Adelaide, SA	All ages	Saturday 1 August 2009
ANU Refectory	Canberra, ACT	Over 18	Tuesday 4 August 2009

Following this tour, Hilltop Hoods launched a second national tour to promote their album. This was the 'Still Standing' tour supported by fellow Golden Era Records artist Vents and their mixer Dj ADFU.

Shows in the 'Still Standing' tour
Venue	City	Audience	Date
Discovery Nightclub	Darwin, NT	Over 18	Friday 16 October 2009
Mangrove Resort Hotel	Broome, WA	Over 18	Saturday 17 October 2009
Hordern Pavilion	Sydney, NSW	All ages	Friday 23 October 2009
Uni Hall, University of Wollongong	Wollongong, NSW	Over 18	Saturday 24 October 2009
Inferno Nightclub	Traralgon, VIC	Over 18	Thursday 29 October 2009
Wrestpoint Entertainment Center	Hobart, TAS	Over 18	Friday 30 October 2009
Albert Hall	Launceston, TAS	All ages	Saturday 31 October 2009
Brisbane Big Top, RNA Showgrounds	Brisbane, QLD	All ages	Friday 6 November 2009
Seagulls Club	Gold Coast, QLD	Over 18	Saturday 7 October 2009
Shadows Entertainment Complex	Mount Gambier, SA	Over 18	Thursday 12 November 2009
Mildura Settlers Tavern	Mildura, VIC	Over 18	Friday 13 November 2009
Jubilee Pavilion, Adelaide Showground	Adelaide, SA	All ages	Saturday 14 November 2009
Bendigo Schweppes Center	Bendigo, VIC	All ages	Friday 20 November 2009
New Albury Hotel	Albury, NSW	Over 18	Sunday 22 November 2009
Festival Hall	Melbourne, VIC	All ages	Thursday 3 December 2009
Brothers Rugby League Ground	Mackay, QLD	All ages	Thursday 10 December 2009
Riverway Stadium	Townsville, QLD	All ages	Friday 11 December 2009
Brothers Leagues Club	Cairns, QLD	All ages	Saturday 12 December 2009

The band also played songs from the new album at shows performed at festivals throughout 2009.

Shows Performed at Festivals in 2009
Festival	City	Date
Groovin' the Moo	Townsville, QLD	Saturday 2 May 2009
Groovin the Moo	Maitland, NSW	Saturday 9 May 2009
Groovin the Moo	Bendigo, VIC	Saturday 16 May 2009
Triple J's One Night Stand	Sale, VIC	Saturday 30 May 2009
Splendour in the Grass	Byron Bay, NSW	Sunday 26 July 2009
One Movement Festival	Perth, WA	Sunday 18 October 2009
Fat as Butter Festival	Newcastle, NSW	Sunday 25 October 2009
Trackside Festival	Canberra, ACT	Saturday 21 November 2009
Open Arms Festival	Coffs Harbour, NSW	Saturday 28 November 2009
Homebake Festival	Sydney, NSW	Saturday 5 December 2009
Falls Music and Arts Festival	Lorne, VIC	Thursday 31 December 2009

== Charts ==
=== Weekly charts ===
Chart (2009–2020)	Peak position
Australian Albums (ARIA)	1

=== Year-end charts ===
Chart (2009)	Position
Australian Albums (ARIA)	12

== Certifications ==
Region	Certification	Certified units/sales
Australia (ARIA)	3× Platinum	210,000^{‡}
^{‡} Sales+streaming figures based on certification alone.
