= Golden Era Mixtape 2012 =

Mixtape by Golden Era Records
- Released: 30 January 2012
- Recorded: 2011–2012
- Genre: Australian hip hop, hip hop
- Length: 46:00 (approx.)
- Label: Golden Era Records
- Producer: Suffa, DJ Adfu, Pokerbeats, DJ Premier, Sesta, Trials, Debate, Rob The Viking, Jaytee

Golden Era Records chronology
Golden Era Mixtape 2011 (2011)	Golden Era Mixtape 2012 (2012)	Golden Era Mixtape 2013 (2013)

Golden Era Mixtape 2012 is a mixtape by all artists signed to Australian hip hop label Golden Era Records. It was released as a free download on 30 January 2012 on the Golden Era Records website. The mixtape was launched on Triple J's Hip-Hop show.

== Track listing ==
1. Briggs & Adfu – Intro
2. Trials – Super Team
3. Sesta – The Fumes That Smell Doom
4. Hilltop Hoods feat. Sia – I Love It (Trials remix)
5. Vents (cuts by Adfu) – Peacemaker
6. Briggs feat. Hau (cuts by Jaytee) – I Wish
7. Interlude
8. Pressure – Something To Say
9. Suffa – Brainbox (remix)
10. Debris, Reflux & Adfu – Remain Classic
11. Trials feat. K21 (cuts by Adfu) – Soylent Green
12. Briggs (cuts by Jaytee) – #sheplife
13. Vents & Briggs (cuts by Adfu) – Forget About It
14. Vents (cuts by Adfu) – Everyday Is A Blast, Chaos, Fallin’ Medley
15. Trials & Adfu (AKA Theory Of Face) – Cambodian Rock, Hello Darkness Medley
16. Funkoars – Carl Sagan
17. Hons – Whiskey
18. Hilltop Hoods – Rattling The Keys To The Kingdom
19. Golden Era – Wsup
