= Golden Era Mixtape 2013 =

Mixtape by Golden Era Records
- Released: 2013
- Genres: Australian hip hop, Hip hop
- Label: Golden Era Records

Golden Era Records chronology
Golden Era Mixtape 2012 (2012)	Golden Era Mixtape 2013 (2013)	Golden Era Mixtape 2014 (2014)

Golden Era Mixtape 2013 is a mixtape by all artists signed to Australian hip hop label Golden Era Records. As was the case with the Golden Era mixtapes that were released prior to 2013, the Golden Era Mixtape 2013 is publicly available as a free download.

== Details ==
The 2013 mixtape is hosted by Vents, a Golden Era artist from Adelaide, Australia, with support from mixer/DJ Jaytee. The final track on the mixtape "Cypher" is a collaboration that features the entire Golden Era roster and serves as an introduction for 2013 signing K21.

== Track listing ==
No.	Title	Producer	Length
1.	"Intro" (Vents & Jaytee)
2.	"Suffa & Sesta Pt.2" (Suffa & Sesta)	Suffa (cuts by Adfu)
3.	"Won't Stop (P-MIX)" (K21 featuring Pressure)	MDUSU
4.	"Rather be Dead (Remix)" (Sesta)	Jaytee
5.	"Back in a Minute" (Briggs)	Paul Swiftly Bartlett
6.	"Serve Em Up" (Vents)	DJ Premier (taken from Big Shug's "Hardbody")
7.	"32 lines (Dedlee Tribute)" (Suffa)	Jase (additional production by Suffa)
8.	"No Doubt" (Adfu, DJ Debris, Jaytee, DJ Reflux)	DJ Debris
9.	"Widness" (Trials & Sesta)	Roots Manuva (taken from Roots Manuva's "Witness (One Hope)")
10.	"Larry Emdur" (The Funkoars)	Trials
11.	"Marked For Death Shook Ones Mash-Up" (Vents)	Trials (cuts by Adfu)
12.	"T+H=F" (Briggs)	Black Milk (taken from Black Milk's "Black & Brown")
13.	"Put Your Dollar Up" (Trials & K21 feat. Seth Sentry)	(Taken from Molemen's "Put Your Quarter Up" feat. Slug Aesop Rock & MF Doom)
14.	"Love in the World (Remix)" (Suffa)	BVA & DJ Katch (taken From BVA's "Love In The World")
15.	"Interlude" (DJ Debris)
16.	"Blackseat Freestyle" (Briggs)	Hit-Boy (taken from Kendrick Lamar's "Backseat Freestyle")
17.	"Rattling The Keys To The Kingdom (K21 Remix)" (Hilltop Hoods)
18.	"Macho Man Randy Savage" (Trials, Briggs & K21)	Trials (cuts by Jaytee)
19.	"Anytime (Outside)" (Theory Of Face)	Trials (cuts by Adfu)
20.	"Unbreakable 2004" (Pressure)	Suffa (previously unreleased track from The Hard Road)
21.	"Medley" (Vents)	Trials
22.	"Posse Cut" (Briggs, Vents, The Funkoars, Hilltop Hoods & K21)	Budo (taken from Grieves' "Bloody Poetry")
