= National Indigenous Music Awards 2017 =

Annual Australian music awards ceremony

- Date: 12 August 2017
- Venue: The Amphitheatre Botanical Gardens, Northern Territory, Australia

Highlights
- Most wins: Troy Cassar-Daley & A.B. Original featuring Dan Sultan (2)
- Most nominations: Dan Sultan & A.B. Original (4)
- Website: nima.musicnt.com.au

Television/radio coverage
- Network: National Indigenous Television

The National Indigenous Music Awards 2017 were the 14th annual National Indigenous Music Awards.

The nominations were announced on 31 July 2017 and the awards ceremony was held on 12 August 2017.

A National Indigenous Music Awards compilation The Sound of Indigenous Australia double album was released in conjunction with Warner Music Australia and featured tracks from this year's nominees, while the second disc features anthems of Indigenous Australia including Yothu Yindi's "Treaty", Archie Roach's "Took the Children Away", Christine Anu's "My Island Home", Warumpi Band's "Blackfella/Whitefella", Kev Carmody's "From Little Things Big Things Grow" and more.

== Performers ==
- AB Original
- Paul Kelly
- Dan Sultan
- Gawurra
- Red Flag Dancers
- Leah Flanagan
- Electric Fields
- Apakatja
- Emily Wurramara

== Triple J Unearthed National Indigenous Winner ==
- Baker Boy

Baker Boy is a 20-year-old, born in Darwin and raised in the remote Northern Territory communities Milingimbi and Maningrida. He released his debut single, "Cloud 9" in April 2017.

== Awards ==
Artist of the Year

Artist	Result
A.B. Original	Nominated
Dan Sultan	Nominated
Jessica Mauboy	Nominated
Troy Cassar-Daley	Won

New Talent of the Year

Artist	Result
Apakatjah	Nominated
Electric Fields	Won
Emily Wurramara	Nominated
Tia Gostelow	Nominated
Yirrmal	Nominated

Album of the Year

Artist and album	Result
A.B. Original - Reclaim Australia	Nominated
Busby Marou - Postcards from the Shell House	Nominated
Leah Flanagan - Saudades	Nominated
Troy Cassar-Daley - Things I Carry Around	Won

Film Clip of the Year

Artist and song	Result
A.B. Original featuring Dan Sultan – "January 26"	Won
Dan Sultan - "Magnetic"	Nominated
Lonely Boys - "Hunter"	Nominated
Lorrpu - "Lorrpu"	Nominated

Song of the Year

Artist and song	Result
A.B. Original featuring Dan Sultan – "January 26"	Won
Emily Wurramara - "Hey Love"	Nominated
Leah Flanagan - "Chills"	Nominated
Lonely Boys - "Hunter"	Nominated
Troy Cassar-Daley - "Things I Carry Around"	Nominated
Yirrmal - "The Bridge"	Nominated

Community Clip of the Year

Artist and song	Result
Halls Creek - "Save the Water 'Ngaba'"	Won
Logan - "Logan City"	Nominated
Ngukurr - "Choose Water'"	Nominated
Dust Up - "With Knowledge Comes New Friends"	Nominated
NPY Lands - "2016 – Warakurna"	Nominated
