= The Light You Burned =

Single by Hilltop Hoods featuring Trials

from the album State of the Art
- Released: 29 December 2009
- Genre: Australian hip hop
- Length: 4:17
- Label: Golden Era Records
- Songwriter(s): Matthew Lambert (Suffa), Daniel Smith (Pressure), Barry Francis (DJ Debris), Daniel Rankine
- Producer(s): Hilltop Hoods

Hilltop Hoods singles chronology
"Still Standing" (2009)	"The Light You Burned" (2009)	"I Love It" (2011)

"The Light You Burned" is a song by Australian group, Hilltop Hoods. It was released in December 2009 as the third and final single from their fifth studio album, State of the Art. The song peaked at number 62 on the ARIA Charts in March 2010.

== Track listing ==
All tracks are written by Matthew Lambert (Suffa), Daniel Smith (Pressure), Barry Francis (DJ Debris), Daniel Rankine. These tracks contain samples of the song, "Hot Line Conversation", by Giant Crab

The Light You Burned
No.	Title	Length
1.	"The Light You Burned" (Radio Edit)	4:17
2.	"The Light You Burned"	4:17
3.	"The Light You Burned" (Instrumental)	4:17
4.	"The Light You Burned" (Remix)	3:46
5.	"The Light You Burned" (Remix Instrumental)	3:46

== Personnel ==
- Artwork (Graphic Design) - Benjamin Funnell
- Artwork (Illustration) - John Engelhardt
- Mastered - Neville Clark
- Mixed, Produced - Matthew Lambert

== Charts ==
Chart (2010)	Peak position
Australia (ARIA)	62

== Release history ==
Region	Date	Label	Format	Catalogue
Australia	29 December 2009	Golden Era	CD, Digital	GERCDS003
