= January 26 (song) =

Single by A.B. Original featuring Dan Sultan

from the album Reclaim Australia
- Released: 19 August 2016
- Length: 3:20
- Label: Golden Era
- Songwriters: Adam Briggs; Daniel Rankine; Dan Sultan
- Producer: Trails

A. B. Original singles chronology
"Take Me Home" (2016)	"January 26" (2016)	"Dumb Things" (2017)

Dan Sultan singles chronology
"Dirty Ground" (2014)	"January 26" (2016)	"Magnetic" (2016)

Music video
- "January 26 " on YouTube

"January 26" is a song by Australian hip hop duo A.B. Original featuring singer Dan Sultan and was released digitally on 19 August 2016, as the fifth and final single from A.B. Original's debut studio album Reclaim Australia. January 26 is the date of Australia Day, held on the anniversary of the date that the First Fleet arrived in Australia.

In December 2016, the song was the feature of a Facebook event, which encouraged people to vote for the song in the Triple J Hottest 100, 2016. The song was placed at number 16 on the countdown that took place on 26 January 2017. The 2017 countdown was the last time the annual Triple J Hottest 100 countdown took place on 26 January due to opposition to Australia Day's celebratory commemoration of British settlement, which the song criticises.

At the National Indigenous Music Awards of 2017, the song won Song of the Year and Film Clip of the Year. At the 2017 AIR independent Music Awards, the song won Best Independent single.

At the 2017 South Australian Music Awards, the song won Best Song and Best Music video.

== Background and release ==
Adam Briggs from A.B. Original said "We don't want to piss on your nan's grave but that's what it means to us. Is a slap in the face. It's a hard thing for us to discuss. It's a difficult topic, when we're usually met with such resistance." Trials said: "We want to make people think from our perspective. Imagine if we had a holiday to piss on your nan's grave. We want people to take that and think 'yeah wow that's pretty disrespectful'. Now think about that as a whole, all your ancestors are having their deaths celebrated, then we can have a conversation." In January 2017, the duo said "When we put it out we knew it was going to be a polarising subject." Trials added "Change doesn't really come from people being comfortable and complacent. If that means that we're the guys up there being a little uncomfortable by spreading and sharing this message, then we're prepared for that."

== Reception ==
Andrew Stafford from The Guardian said "In the tradition of all great protest songs, '[January 26]' was uncompromising, accessible and effective." Stafford likened the song to Archie Roach's "Took the Children Away" in 1990.

In January 2017, ABC said the song is the "most significant, topical, and potentially controversial song" on the Triple J Hottest 100 countdown and is "about moving forward".

== Promotion ==
The music video premiered on YouTube on 7 September 2016 and was directed by Richard Coburn.

== Track listing ==
- Digital download
1. "January 26" – 3:20

== Certifications ==
Certifications for "January 26"
Region	Certification	Certified units/sales
Australia (ARIA)	Gold	35,000^{‡}
^{‡} Sales+streaming figures based on certification alone.

== Release history ==
Country	Date	Format	Label
Australia	19 August 2016	digital download; streaming	Golden Era
