= Shredding the Balloon =

Single by Hilltop Hoods

from the album Drinking from the Sun
- Released: 20 July 2012
- Recorded: 2011–2012
- Genre: Hip-Hop/Rap
- Length: 4:45
- Label: Golden Era Records
- Songwriters: Matthew David Lambert, Daniel Howe Smith, Barry John M. Francis (DJ Debris), N Lambert

Hilltop Hoods singles chronology
"Speaking in Tongues" (2012)	"Shredding the Balloon" (2012)	"Rattling the Keys to the Kingdom" (2012)

"Shredding the Balloon" is a song by the Australian hip hop group, Hilltop Hoods. It was released on 20 July 2012 as the third single from their sixth studio album, Drinking From the Sun.

== Music video ==
The music video premiered on the V Music website on 10 July 2012 and was released on YouTube the following day.

The video was filmed in The Masonic Lodge, located in Adelaide, Australia, and was produced and directed by Unity Sound & Visual (Selina Miles and Australian hip hop producer, ADFU).

=== Narrative ===
It features the group sitting around a large banquet of grapes and wine, and switches between this and what appears to be a couple on a night out. No story has been released stating the exact meaning of the video however it appears that the male, in reality, is a drunken mess and the female represents him throughout the video. In the third verse of the song, Suffa talks about his sobriety so the video interlinks with this.

At the end of the clip, the female falls from a large height and lands on the table at which Suffa, Pressure and DJ Debris are seated. Her death is a metaphor for the male leaving his drug ridden lifestyle and starting over. He can be seen smiling when she dies and he then walks away.

== Certifications ==
Certifications for "Shredding the Balloon"
Region	Certification	Certified units/sales
Australia (ARIA)	Platinum	70,000^{‡}
^{‡} Sales+streaming figures based on certification alone.
