= Speaking in Tongues (Hilltop Hoods song) =

Single by Hilltop Hoods featuring Chali 2na

from the album Drinking from the Sun
- Released: 17 April 2012
- Recorded: 2011–2012
- Genre: Hip-Hop/Rap
- Length: 4:03
- Label: Golden Era Records
- Songwriters: Matthew David Lambert, Daniel Howe Smith, Barry John M. Francis (DJ Debris), C Stewart
- Producer: Suffa

Hilltop Hoods singles chronology
"I Love It" (2011)	"Speaking in Tongues" (2012)	"Shredding the Balloon" (2012)

"Speaking in Tongues" is a song by Australian hip hop band, Hilltop Hoods, featuring American rapper, Chali 2na. The song was released in April 2012 as the second single from their sixth studio album, Drinking From the Sun. The song peaked at number 88 on the ARIA charts.

== Music video ==
The music video, released on 16 April 2012, features the group performing the song in a warehouse space while seated on couches. Animated graffiti images appear behind the trio on the walls of the space and are synchronised with the lyrics of the song.

Footage of Chali 2na rapping in an outdoor urban setting is featured during his parts; he is also depicted sitting in a room similar to that in which the Hilltop Hoods is seated.

== Charts ==
Chart (2012)	Peak position
Australia (ARIA)	88

== Certifications ==
Region	Certification	Certified units/sales
Australia (ARIA)	Platinum	70,000^{‡}
^{‡} Sales+streaming figures based on certification alone.
