= Rattling the Keys to the Kingdom =

Single by Hilltop Hoods

from the album Drinking from the Sun
- Released: 21 September 2012
- Genre: Hip-Hop/Rap
- Length: 3:33
- Label: Golden Era Records
- Songwriter(s): Barry Francis, Matthew Lambert, Daniel Smith, Steve Cropper, Donald "Duck" Dunn, Al Jackson Jr., Booker T. Jones

Hilltop Hoods singles chronology
"Shredding the Balloon" (2012)	"Rattling the Keys to the Kingdom" (2012)	"Won't Let You Down" (2014)

"Rattling the Keys to the Kingdom" is a song by Australian hip hop group Hilltop Hoods. The song was the fourth and final single from their sixth studio album, Drinking from the Sun in September 2012. The song debuted at No. 64 on the ARIA Singles Chart in the same week Drinking From the Sun debuted at No. 1 on the ARIA Albums Chart.

== Content ==
The song is about the Hilltop Hoods conquering the Australian hip hop scene, as they are the most successful Australian rap group, and were the first to gain mainstream exposure.

== Music video ==
The song's accompanying music video was uploaded to the Hilltop Hoods' official YouTube channel on 20 September 2012. It runs for 4 minutes and 7 seconds. The music video features many cameos (or name-drops) from Australian rappers, who rap the song with a black background while their name appears on screen. This takes up the majority of the video, but there are other scenes where the Hilltop Hoods rap the song in front of a graffitied wall. The video's description describes the idea behind all the appearances from other rappers in video, it reads "We wanted to do something that was unique and at the same time unifying. So we decided to invite members of the Hip Hop community from all over Australia to join us in the making of the film clip", they also added that they wanted to use the video to promote other artists they felt deserved more recognition.

== Samples ==
The song contains a sample of the song 'B.I vs Friendship' by Gang Starr.

== Charts ==
Chart (2012)	Peak position
Australia (ARIA)	64

== Certifications ==
Region	Certification	Certified units/sales
Australia (ARIA)	Platinum	70,000^{‡}
^{‡} Sales+streaming figures based on certification alone.
