= A.B. Original =

Indigenous Australian hip hop duo

- Origin: South Australia, Australia
- Genres: Australian hip hop; political hip hop
- Years active: 2016–present
- Labels: Golden Era; Bad Apples
- Members: Briggs; Trials

A.B. Original is an Australian hip hop duo made up of Indigenous Australian rappers Briggs and record producer Trials. A.B. Original stands for Always Black, Original. Both members are Indigenous Australians; Briggs is a Yorta Yorta man and Trials is Ngarrindjeri. Their music is overtly political and has been described as "angry, polemical, brutally frank and meant to inspire a response, good or bad".

== History ==
In the early 2000s, Briggs and Trials met at a Funkoars gig at the Corner Hotel in Melbourne.

In 2015, they were asked to play Triple J's Beat the Drum festival, which led to A.B. Original solidifying as a duo in 2016. The pair travelled to Los Angeles, the source of their musical childhood inspirations. They worked with DJ Pooh (Snoop Dogg, 2Pac, Ice Cube) at Snoop Dogg's in-house studio; DJ Mustard (Big Sean, Rihanna, Wiz Khalifa); and did a stint at Encore Studios, where Dr. Dre made 2001. 1980s Compton rapper King T, appeared on their G-Funk heavy track “The Feast”.

== Music ==
A.B. Original's single "January 26" (featuring Dan Sultan), released in August 2016, which comments on the use of that date for Australia Day. This was followed up by an album entitled Reclaim Australia in November. The provocatively titled album features many guests including Thelma Plum, G. Yunupingu and Archie Roach. The album's themes addresses Black deaths in custody; “Invasion Day”; racial profiling; life spent weathering systemic racism; and the low life expectancy of Aboriginal Australians. The group approached the album with the attitude that it would be their only record. Trials explained in an interview: "Briggs and I were going to do one big career ending, burning the... joint down record and that was it. We figured if we're going to have one shot."

At the 2017 AIR independent Music Awards, the duo won five awards; Breakthrough Independent Artist of the Year, Best Independent Hip Hop Album, Best Independent Single, Best Independent Artist and Best Independent Album or EP. At the APRA Music Awards of 2018 the duo won Songwriter of the Year.

In August 2022, A.B. Original returned with "King Billy Cokebottle" their first new music in four years. The song's title refers to the stage name of a 1970s comedian, called Louis Beers, who toured Australia with his blackface act.

In October 2023, A.B. Original released "Yes" in support of the 2023 Australian Indigenous Voice referendum.

== Band members ==
- Briggs
- Trials

== Discography ==
=== Albums ===
Title	Album details	Peak chart positions
Title	Album details	AUS
Reclaim Australia	Release date: 25 November 2016; Label: Golden Era; Formats: Digital download, CD	10

=== Singles ===
List of singles, with certifications
Title	Year	Certifications	Album
"2 Black 2 Strong"	2016		Reclaim Australia
"Dead in a Minute" (featuring Caiti Baker)	2016		Reclaim Australia
"Firing Squad" (featuring Hau)	2016		Reclaim Australia
"Take Me Home" (featuring Geoffrey Gurrumul Yunupingu)	2016		Reclaim Australia
"January 26" (featuring Dan Sultan)	2016	ARIA: Gold	Reclaim Australia
"Dumb Things" (featuring Paul Kelly)	2017		Like a Version
"Blaccout"	2018		non-album single
"King Billy Cokebottle"	2022		TBA
"Yes" (with DJ Total Eclipse and Marlon)	2023		TBA

== Awards and nominations ==
=== AIR Awards ===
The Australian Independent Record Awards (commonly known informally as AIR Awards) is an annual awards night to recognise, promote and celebrate the success of Australia's Independent Music sector.

Year	Nominee / work	Award	Result
2017	themselves	Independent Artist of the Year	Won
2017	themselves	Breakthrough Independent Artist	Won
2017	Reclaim Australia	Best Independent Album	Won
2017	Reclaim Australia	Best Independent Hip Hop/Urban Album	Won
2017	"January 26" (with Dan Sultan)	Best Independent Single/EP	Won
2019	"Blaccout"	Best Independent Single/EP	Nominated

=== APRA Music Awards ===
The APRA Awards are presented annually from 1982 by the Australasian Performing Right Association (APRA), "honouring composers and songwriters".

Year	Nominee / work	Award	Result	Ref.
2018	themselves	Songwriter of the Year	Won	
2019	"Blaccout" (Adam Briggs / Daniel Rankine)	Song of the Year	Shortlisted	

=== ARIA Music Awards ===
The ARIA Music Awards is an annual awards ceremony that recognises excellence, innovation, and achievement across all genres of the music of Australia.

Year	Nominee / work	Award	Result
2017	Reclaim Australia	Album of the Year	Nominated
2017	Reclaim Australia	Best Group	Nominated
2017	Reclaim Australia	Best Urban Album	Won
2017	Reclaim Australia	Best Independent Release	Won
2017	Reclaim Australia	Breakthrough Artist	Nominated
2017	Daniel Rankine for Reclaim Australia	Producer of the Year	Nominated

=== Australian Music Prize ===
The Australian Music Prize (the AMP) is an annual award of $30,000 given to an Australian band or solo artist in recognition of the merit of an album released during the year of award. The commenced in 2005.

Year	Nominee / work	Award	Result
2016	Reclaim Australia	Australian Music Prize	Won

=== J Award ===
The J Awards are an annual series of Australian music awards that were established by the Australian Broadcasting Corporation's youth-focused radio station Triple J. They commenced in 2005.

Year	Nominee / work	Award	Result
2017	Reclaim Australia	Australian Album of the Year	Won
2017	"Report to the Mist"	Australian Video of the Year	Nominated

=== Music Victoria Awards ===
The Music Victoria Awards, are an annual awards night celebrating Victorian music. They commenced in 2005.

Year	Nominee / work	Award	Result
2017	themselves	Best Band	Nominated
2017	themselves	Best Live Act	Nominated
2017	themselves	Best Aboriginal Act	Won
2017	Reclaim Australia	Best Album	Won
2017	Reclaim Australia	Best Hip Hop Album	Won
2017	"January 26"	Best Song	Nominated

=== National Indigenous Music Awards ===
The National Indigenous Music Awards recognise excellence, innovation and leadership among Aboriginal and Torres Strait Islander musicians from throughout Australia. They commenced in 2004.

Year	Nominee / work	Award	Result
2016	themselves	New Talent of the Year	Nominated
2016	"Dead in a Minute"	Song of the Year	Nominated
2016	"2 Black 2 Strong"	Song of the Year	Nominated
2017	themselves	Artist of the Year	Nominated
2017	Reclaim Australia	Album of the Year	Nominated
2017	"January 26" (with Dan Sultan)	Song of the Year	Won
2017	"January 26" (with Dan Sultan)	Film Clip of the Year	Won
2018	themselves	Artist of the Year	Nominated
2023	"King Billy Cokebottle"	Film Clip of the Year	Nominated

=== National Live Music Awards ===
The National Live Music Awards (NLMAs) are a broad recognition of Australia's diverse live industry, celebrating the success of the Australian live scene. The awards commenced in 2016.

Year	Nominee / work	Award	Result	Ref.
2016	A.B. Original	Live Hip Hop Act of the Year	Nominated	
2017	Themselves	Live Hip Hop Act of the Year	Won	
2017	Themselves	Best Live Act of the Year - People's Choice	Nominated	
2018	A.B. Original	Live Hip Hop Act of the Year	Nominated	

=== South Australian Music Awards ===
The South Australian Music Awards (previously known as the Fowler's Live Music Awards) are annual awards that exist to recognise, promote and celebrate excellence in the South Australian contemporary music industry. They commenced in 2012.

Year	Nominee / work	Award	Result (wins only)
2016	A.B. Original	Best Aboriginal or Torres Strait Island Artist	Won
2017	A.B. Original	Best Group	Won
2017	A.B. Original	Best Aboriginal or Torres Strait Island Artist	Won
2017	A.B. Original	Most Popular Hip Hop Artist	Won
2017	"January 26" (featuring Dan Sultan)	Best Song	Won
2017	"January 26" (featuring Dan Sultan)	Best Video	Won
2018	A.B. Original	Best Aboriginal or Torres Strait Island Artist	Won
