= Drinking from the Sun =

Studio album by Hilltop Hoods
- Released: 9 March 2012
- Recorded: 2011–2012
- Genre: Australian hip-hop
- Length: 41:24
- Label: Golden Era
- Producer: Jaytee; K21; One Above; Pokerbeats; Suffa; Trials

Hilltop Hoods chronology
State of the Art (2009)	Drinking from the Sun (2012)	Walking Under Stars (2014)

Singles from Drinking from the Sun
- 1. "I Love It" Released: 25 November 2011; 2. "Speaking in Tongues" Released: 17 April 2012; 3. "Shredding the Balloon" Released: 20 July 2012; 4. "Rattling the Keys to the Kingdom" Released: 20 September 2012

Drinking from the Sun is the sixth studio album by Australian hip hop group the Hilltop Hoods. The album was released on 9 March 2012. The album's first single, "I Love It", was released on 25 November 2011, and features vocals from fellow South Australian and Adelaide-born singer-songwriter Sia. The album debuted at number one on the Australian Albums Chart reaching gold status on its first day, making it Hilltop Hood's third consecutive chart-topping album. The album is certified double platinum in Australia. It received four nominations at the ARIA Music Awards of 2012, becoming the group's fourth consecutive release and third consecutive studio album to win Best Urban Album.

== Background ==
Not many details were released about the album. Suffa, in an interview with Tom & Alex of Triple j, briefly talked about the album, saying:

I wouldn't say it sticks out but it's a bit different to the rest of the record. The rest of the record is a bit darker. We're still finishing it... I've got no perspective on it... It could sound like anything. It could sound like a Wiggles and Metallica collaboration for all I know at this stage.
– Suffa

The album's first single "I Love It", which features fellow South Australian Sia, was released on 25 November 2011.

On 24 January 2012, the band leaked the song "Rattling the Keys to the Kingdom" from the album.

On 6 February 2012, the track listing was confirmed on the band's Tumblr page.

On 17 April, the group released the second single Speaking in Tongues, along with its music video, which features animated graffiti effects.

On 10 July, the video premier for the new single Shredding the Balloon was shown on V Music and Channel V. The single itself was released on 20 July 2012.

On 20 September, the 4th single Rattling the Keys to the Kingdom was released. The video features the group, and many other Australian Hip-Hop artists. The Hoods stated that they wanted to do something different, yet unifying at the same time. The film clip illustrates how far Hip-Hop has come in Australia in the last 10–20 years from something unheard of to being a whole new popular genre.

== Content ==
The album is features the three-part "The Thirst" as the opening, tenth and final tracks, all featuring the same instrumental. Part 1 features a sole verse from MC Pressure about the groups return following 2009's multi-platinum State of the Art. Part 2 features samples of interviews with Pressure explaining the origins of the album title, whilst Part 3 features a verse from Suffa and contains a sample of a voice stating that the group 'were recording enough music for two albums. That was pre-meditated'.

Notable guest features on the album include Black Thought of The Roots on 'Living in Bunkers' and Chali 2na on Speaking in Tongues.

== Track listing ==
No.	Title	Writer(s)	Producer(s)	Length
1.	"The Thirst (Part 1)"	M. Lambert, D. Smith, B. Francis, W. Phoenix	One Above	1:41
2.	"Drinking from the Sun"	M. Lambert, D. Smith, B. Francis, A. Schefrin, M. Zager	Suffa	3:09
3.	"I Love It" (featuring Sia)	M. Lambert, D. Smith, B. Francis, S. Furler	One Above	3:46
4.	"Lights Out"	M. Lambert, D. Smith, B. Francis	Jaytee	3:43
5.	"Living in Bunkers" (featuring Lotek and Black Thought)	M. Lambert, D. Smith, B. Francis, T. Trotter	Suffa	3:42
6.	"Speaking in Tongues" (featuring Chali 2na)	M. Lambert, D. Smith, B. Francis, C. Stewart, C. Green	Suffa	4:03
7.	"Now You're Gone"	M. Lambert, D. Smith, B. Francis, D. Rankine, S. Denny, K. Van Ordstrand	Trials	3:10
8.	"Good for Nothing"	M. Lambert, D. Smith, B. Francis	Pokerbeats	3:02
9.	"Rattling the Keys to the Kingdom"	M. Lambert, D. Smith, B. Francis, S. Cropper, D. Dunn, A. Jackson Jr., B. Jones	Suffa	3:33
10.	"The Thirst (Part 2)"	M. Lambert, D. Smith, B. Francis, W. Phoenix	One Above	1:05
11.	"The Underground" (featuring Classified & Solo)	M. Lambert, D. Smith, B. Francis, L. Boyd, J. Hartford, N. Bryant-Smith	Suffa	4:08
12.	"Shredding the Balloon"	M. Lambert, D. Smith, B. Francis, N. Lambert	Suffa	4:45
13.	"The Thirst (Part 3)"	M. Lambert, D. Smith, B. Francis, W. Phoenix	One Above	1:37
14.	"Good for Nothing" (K21 Remix)	M. Lambert, D. Smith, B. Francis	K21	3:09

JB Hi-Fi bonus track
No.	Title	Writer(s)	Producer(s)	Length
15.	"Now You’re Gone" (Suffa Remix)	M. Lambert, D. Smith, B. Francis	Suffa	3:03

iTunes bonus track
No.	Title	Writer(s)	Producer(s)	Length
15.	"Drinking From the Sun" (K21 Remix)	M. Lambert, D. Smith, B. Francis	K21	3:09

== Chart positions ==
=== Weekly charts ===
Chart (2012–13)	Peak position
Australian Albums (ARIA)	1
Australian Urban Albums (ARIA)	1
New Zealand Albums (RMNZ)	37

=== Year-end charts ===
Chart (2012)	Peak position
Australian Albums (ARIA)	13

=== Decade-end charts ===
Chart (2010–2019)	Position
Australian Albums (ARIA)	62
Australian Artist Albums (ARIA)	10

== Certifications ==
Region	Certification	Certified units/sales
Australia (ARIA)	2× Platinum	140,000^{^}
New Zealand (RMNZ)	Gold	7,500^{‡}
^{^} Shipments figures based on certification alone.^{‡} Sales+streaming figures based on certification alone.
