= Still Standing (Hilltop Hoods song) =

Single by Hilltop Hoods

from the album State of the Art
- Released: 18 September 2009
- Recorded: X Bred Production Studios, Adelaide, South Australia
- Genre: Australian hip hop
- Length: 3:31
- Label: Golden Era Records
- Songwriters: Matthew Lambert, (Suffa), Daniel Smith (Pressure), Barry Francis (DJ Debris), Henry Lawes, Matthew McFahn,
- Producer: Hilltop Hoods

Hilltop Hoods singles chronology
| "Chase That Feeling" (2009) | "Still Standing" (2009) | "The Light You Burned" (2009) |

"Still Standing" is a song by Australian group, Hilltop Hoods. It was released in September 2009 as the second single from their fifth studio album, State of the Art. The song peaked at number 34 on the ARIA charts.

The song "Your Teeth in my Neck" by Scientist was sampled heavily throughout the song.

== Track listing ==
All tracks are written by Matthew Lambert (Suffa), Daniel Smith (Pressure), Barry Francis (DJ Debris), Henry Lawes, Matthew McFahn

Still Standing
| No. | Title | Length |
|---|---|---|
| 1. | "Still Standing" (Radio Edit) | 3:31 |
| 2. | "Still Standing" | 3:31 |
| 3. | "Still Standing" (Instrumental) | 3:31 |
| 4. | "Still Standing" (Remix) | 3:09 |
| 5. | "Still Standing" (Remix Instrumental) | 3:09 |

== Charts ==
=== Weekly chart ===
| Chart (2009) | Peak position |
|---|---|
| Australia (ARIA) | 34 |

=== Year-end chart ===
| Chart (2009) | Rank |
|---|---|
| Australian Artists (ARIA) | 35 |

== Certifications ==
| Region | Certification | Certified units/sales |
|---|---|---|
| Australia (ARIA) | 2× Platinum | 140,000^{‡} |
^{‡} Sales+streaming figures based on certification alone.
