= Reclaim Australia (album) =

Studio album by A.B. Original
- Released: 25 November 2016
- Length: 41:58
- Label: Golden Era

Singles from Reclaim Australia
- 1. "2 Black 2 Strong" Released: 20 April 2016; 2. "Dead in a Minute" Released: 6 May 2016; 3. "Firing Squad" Released: 6 May 2016; 4. "Take Me Home" Released: 5 July 2016; 5. "January 26" Released: 19 August 2016

Reclaim Australia is the debut studio album from Australian hip hop duo A.B. Original, released on 28 November 2016 through Golden Era Records.

The title refers to the far-right Australian political party of the same name, and the album covers issues themes including police brutality, Indigenous deaths in custody and Australia Day.

Reclaim Australia peaked at number 10 on the ARIA Albums Chart and won various awards, including the Australian Music Prize, Australian Album of the Year at the 2016 J Awards, and both Best Independent Album or EP and Best Independent Hip Hop Album at the 2017 AIR Independent Music Awards.

== Critical reception ==
Ariana Norton from Beat Magazine said "Simmering with anger and set to classic '80s hip hop beats, Reclaim Australia is immediately reminiscent of N.W.A in its unapologetic approach to the injustices still faced by Aboriginal Australians. The album includes excerpts of speeches made about 'breeding out' Aboriginal people, as well as an introduction by Archie Roach, who remembers protesting for land rights in the '70s... There's a deep pain and anguish that underlies Reclaim Australias ferocity. Briggs and Trials demand that we sit up, take notice and take action.

Bernard Zuel from The Sydney Morning Herald said "Reclaim Australia is the most forthright, engaged and wholly committed political musical statement made here in a long time." adding "You will find yourself saying hell yeah this is appalling, still; shouting at the radio/stereo/phone in unison with Briggs and Trials; and declaring I'm seriously bloody angry".

David James Young from Music Feeds called the album a "successful experiment" saying "It's playful, but never to the point of losing sight of the message. It's forthright and unapologetic about the issues it discusses, but neither Briggs nor Rankine are ever in a position to let a punchline or sarcastic quip slip through their fingers."

Sosefina Fuamoli from The AU Review called the album "a masterclass" saying "What's great about A.B Original and Reclaim Australia is that their approach leaves no stone unturned; this isn't rap music doled out for its pure shock factor. This is music that channels the anger and pain of people who have long been stood over and have been demeaned and dehumanised for generations. It might be hard to listen to, but that's the point. Where the majority of listeners (myself included) have had the opportunity to turn a blind eye and turn the volume down, this album is an insight into the lives of those who have been stripped of that choice."

== Track listing ==
No.	Title	Writer(s)	Producer(s)	Length
1.	"Foreword" (featuring Archie Roach)	Adam Briggs; Daniel Rankine; Archie Roach	Trials	1:31
2.	"2 Black 2 Strong"	Briggs; Rankine; Darren Reutens	Dazastah	4:03
3.	"Call 'Em Out" (featuring Guilty Simpson)	Briggs; Rankine; Reutens; Byron Simpson	Dazastah	4:11
4.	"Dead in a Minute" (featuring Caiti Baker)	Briggs; Rankine; Caiti Baker; Isiah Sominique Libeau	SmokeyGotBeatz	3:13
5.	"January 26" (featuring Dan Sultan)	Briggs; Rankine; Dan Sultan	Trials	3:17
6.	"Strong Arm (Robbery)" (featuring Rodney-O)	Briggs; Rankine; Reutens	Dazastah	1:44
7.	"Firing Squad" (featuring Hau)	Briggs; Langomi-e-Hau Latukefu; Rankine; Reutens	Dazastah	2:58
8.	"Sorry" (featuring Caiti Baker)	Briggs; Baker; Michael Hohnen; James Mangohig; Rankine	James Mangohig	3:29
9.	"The Feast" (featuring King T)	Briggs; Roger McBride; Rankine; Reutens	Dazastah	3:54
10.	"Report to the Mist"	Briggs; Rankine; Jacob Turier	Jayteehazard	3:56
11.	"I C U" (featuring Thelma Plum)	Briggs; M. Bryant; Rob Conely; Thelma Plum; Rankine	Rob Conely	3:51
12.	"Take Me Home" (featuring Gurrumul Yunupingu)	Briggs; Rankine; Gurrumul Yunupingu	Trials	5:51

== Personnel ==
A.B. Original

- Briggs – writing, vocals (1–12)
- Trials – vocals (1–12), production 1, 5, 12)

Other musicians

- Archie Roach – writing, vocals (1)
- Daniel Rankine – writing (1–12)
- Darren Reutens – writing, production (2–3, 6–7, 9)
- Guilty Simpson – writing, vocals (3)
- Caiti Baker – writing, vocals (4, 8)
- SmokeyGotBeatz – writing, production (4)
- Dan Sultan – writing, vocals (5)
- Rodney-O – vocals (6)
- Hau Latukefu – writing, vocals (7)
- Michael Hohnen – writing (8)
- James Mangohig – writing, production (8)
- King T – writing, vocals (9)
- Jacob Turier – writing (10)
- Jayteehazard – production (10)
- Thelma Plum – writing, vocals (10)
- M. Bryant – writing (11)
- Rob Conely – writing, production (11)
- Gurrumul Yunupingu – writing, vocals (12)

== Charts ==
Chart (2016)	Peak position
Australian Albums (ARIA)	10

== Release history ==
Country	Date	Format	Label	Catalogue
Australia	25 November 2016	Digital download, CD	Golden Era Records	GER025
Australia	25 November 2016	LP	Golden Era Records	GERV024
