= Won't Let You Down (song) =

Single by Hilltop Hoods featuring Maverick Sabre

from the album Walking Under Stars
- Released: 27 June 2014
- Genre: Australian hip hop
- Length: 4:27
- Label: Golden Era Records

Hilltop Hoods featuring Maverick Sabre singles chronology
"Rattling the Keys to the Kingdom" (2012)	"Won't Let You Down" (2014)	"Pyramid Building" (2014)

"Won't Let You Down" is a song by Australian hip hop group Hilltop Hoods featuring Irish-English singer-songwriter Maverick Sabre, released through Golden Era Records on 27 June 2014 as the lead single from their seventh studio album Walking Under Stars (2014).

"Won't Let You Down" peaked at number 17 on the ARIA Singles Chart, marking the group's fifth top 40 single.

== Music video ==
The music video was released on 19 August 2014. It currently has over six million YouTube views.

== Charts ==
Chart (2014)	Peak position
Australia (ARIA)	17

== Certifications ==
Region	Certification	Certified units/sales
Australia (ARIA)	2× Platinum	140,000^{‡}
^{‡} Sales+streaming figures based on certification alone.
