= I Love It (Hilltop Hoods song) =

Single by Hilltop Hoods featuring Sia

from the album Drinking from the Sun
- Released: 25 November 2011
- Genre: Hip hop
- Length: 3:45
- Label: Golden Era
- Songwriters: Matthew David Lambert; Daniel Howe Smith; Barry John M. Francis (DJ Debris); Sia Furler
- Producer: One Above

Hilltop Hoods singles chronology
"The Light You Burned" (2009)	"I Love It" (2011)	"Speaking in Tongues" (2012)

Sia singles chronology
"Bring Night" (2010)	"I Love It" (2011)	"Titanium" (2011)

Music video
- "I Love It (Blue Tongue Version)" on YouTube

"I Love It" is a song by Australian hip hop band, Hilltop Hoods, featuring Sia. The single was released on 25 November 2011 and its radio debut occurred on 21 November 2011 on Australian youth radio station, Triple J. "I Love It" is the first single from the album, Drinking From the Sun (2012), and three different music videos were produced for the single. The single is the Hilltop Hoods' second highest-charting and biggest-selling single for the entirety of the group's career.

== Music videos ==
Three separate music videos were released for "I Love It", via the official Hilltop Hoods website.

The first, directed by Carl Allison and Nick Kozakis, opens with Suffa and MC Pressure burning their jumpers. Throughout the video they drive in a black two-door Chrysler Valiant hardtop, picking up hitchhikers along the way. Later it is revealed that they gag the hitchhikers and put them in the boot, only to bury them later. The video closes with the Hilltop Hoods burning their jumpers following such a crime.

The second video (Animal Logic Version), directed by Toby Grime of Animal Logic, features a young child creating a spinning diorama of the bands faces on a turntable. The band appear in the video as computer animations within this diorama. The Animal Logic directed music video was nominated for Best Video at the ARIA Music Awards of 2012.

The third video (Blue Tongue Version), directed by Nash Edgerton, features the band, along with two women, riding BMXs along a dirt path, carrying shovels. They dismount their bikes and climb through trees up a hill, arriving at a cliff looking out over a beach. In the distance a mysterious light can be seen emitting from the sand on the beach. The video closes with MC Pressure digging the sand out in this place, revealing a bright light shining in his face.

== Charts ==
=== Weekly charts ===
Chart (2012)	Peak position
Australia (ARIA)	6
New Zealand (Recorded Music NZ)	13

=== Year-end charts ===
Chart (2012)	Position
Australia (ARIA)	61

== Certifications ==
Region	Certification	Certified units/sales
Australia (ARIA)	8× Platinum	560,000^{‡}
New Zealand (RMNZ)	Platinum	30,000^{‡}
^{‡} Sales+streaming figures based on certification alone.
