= Songs in the Key of Wrestling =

Studio album by Big Noter
- Released: 18 September 2026
- Length: 28:26
- Label: Island Records / Universal Music
- Producer: Nick Didia

Singles from Songs in the Key of Wrestling
- 1. "Identity" Released: 4 April 2025; 2. "Talk Straight" Released: 15 July 2025; 3. "F.M.D" Released: 26 June 2026; 4. "Big Noter" Released: 7 August 2026

Songs in the Key of Wrestling is the debut studio album by Australian punk band Big Noter. The album was announced on 26 June 2026, alongside single "F.M.D". The album was released on 18 September 2026. The album debuted at number 30 on the ARIA Chart.

== Reception ==
Rod Whitfield from Wall of Sound AU rated the album 9/10 and said "The music is raucous, groove-laden rock, but once you add in Briggs's vocals and lyrics, which both spit venom and ooze sarcasm, humour and audacity, you have yourself something rather distinctive." Whitfield concluded the review saying "Put it all together and Songs in the Key of Wrestling is an absolute winner. It's a really, really fun listen. But at the same time, if you peel back some of the layers, you will find real depth, music with meaning and a message, songs that pack a hefty wallop, musically and lyrically."

JD Garrahy from Ever Black called the album "a killer from start to finish." adding "this album is something no Australian should miss, the music is epic, but the message is clear, it’s time for unity as a nation and more importantly, fair treatment of those that own the land we call home."

== Track listing ==
Songs in the Key of Wrestling track listing
| No. | Title | Length |
|---|---|---|
| 1. | "My Genocide" | 2:19 |
| 2. | "It's All Good Til it's Not" | 1:12 |
| 3. | "Talk Straight" | 2:38 |
| 4. | "Identity" | 3:23 |
| 5. | "A Message from Chuck" (featuring Chuck D.) | 0:57 |
| 6. | "By the Time I Get to Yorta Yorta Woka" | 2:57 |
| 7. | "What Ya Swingin At?" | 2:33 |
| 8. | "F.M.D" | 3:09 |
| 9. | "B.M.F" | 3:07 |
| 10. | "Big Noter" (featuring Joe Talbot) | 3:14 |
| 11. | "What's the Matter with Adam?" (featuring Tom Morello) | 2:52 |
| Total length: | | 28:26 |

== Personnel ==
- Briggs – vocals
- Steve Smith – drums
- Craig Strain – bass
- Leigh Davies – guitars

== Charts ==
Chart performance for Pylon
| Chart (2026) | Peak position |
|---|---|
| Australian Albums (ARIA) | 30 |
