= Chase That Feeling =

Single by Hilltop Hoods

from the album State of the Art
- Released: 8 May 2009
- Recorded: X Bred Production Studios, Adelaide, South Australia
- Genre: Australian hip hop
- Length: 3:28
- Label: Golden Era
- Songwriter(s): Matthew Lambert (Suffa), Daniel Smith (Pressure), Barry Francis (DJ Debris), Dale Ossman, John G. Williams and William C. Brown III
- Producer(s): Hilltop Hoods

Hilltop Hoods singles chronology
"Recapturing the Vibe Restrung" (2007)	"Chase That Feeling" (2009)	"Still Standing" (2009)

Music video
- "Chase that Feeling" on YouTube

"Chase That Feeling" a song by Australian group, Hilltop Hoods. It was released for download on 8 May 2009 and as a CD single on 22 May 2009. and is the lead single from the group's fifth studio album, State of the Art.

The song features a return guest appearance by a quartet of members from the Adelaide Symphony Orchestra. The music video had its worldwide premiere on the YouTube homepage on Friday 1 May 2009. It samples "Pass the Word (Love Is the Word)" by the doo wop group The Mad Lads.

"Chase That Feeling" reached number 8 on the ARIA Singles Chart, and was voted in at number 3 in Triple J's Hottest 100 for 2009.

== Track listing ==
All tracks are written by Matthew Lambert (Suffa), Daniel Smith (Pressure), Barry Francis (DJ Debris), Dale Ossman, John G. Williams and William C. Brown III

No.	Title	Length
1.	"Chase That Feeling" (radio edit)	3:28
2.	"Chase That Feeling"	3:28
3.	"Chase That Feeling" (instrumental)	3:28
4.	"Chase That Feeling" (remix)	3:27
5.	"Chase That Feeling" (remix instrumental)	3:29

== Credits ==
- Graphic design – Benjamin Funnell
- Illustration – John Engelhardt
- Mastering – Neville Clark

== Charts ==
=== Weekly charts ===
Chart (2009)	Peak position
Australia (ARIA)	8

=== Year-end charts ===
Chart (2009)	Position
Australia (ARIA)	42

== Certifications ==
Region	Certification	Certified units/sales
Australia (ARIA)	6× Platinum	420,000^{‡}
^{‡} Sales+streaming figures based on certification alone.

== Release history ==
Region	Date	Label	Format	Catalogue
Australia	8 May 2009	Golden Era	Digital download	
Australia	22 May 2009	Golden Era	CD	GERCDS001
