= The Greatest Hits (Funkoars album) =

Studio album by Funkoars
- Released: 17 July 2006
- Genre: Hip-hop
- Length: 48:41
- Label: Obese
- Producer: Trials, Sesta, Suffa

Funkoars chronology
Who's Your Step Daddy (2003)	The Greatest Hits (2006)	The Hangover (2008)

Professional ratings
Review scores
Source	Rating
Rapreviews	7.5/10 stars

The Greatest Hits is the second album released by Australian hip-hop group Funkoars. It was released by Obese Records on 17 July 2006.

Central Station states that the album "'captures the reckless spirit' of a band [w]ell known for their passionate and outrageous lyrics (if somewhat unconventional), onstage antics and energy". Broadcaster PBS 106.7 FM listed the album on 24 July 2006 on its 'Beats Tipsheet' as a suggested CD for electronic and hip hop heads.

Rapreviews stated that Funkoars used a tongue-in-cheek expression to name their second album. The Greatest Hits is not a greatest hits album, despite the title making it appear that way.

The title of the album is a tongue-in-cheek reference to greatest hits albums, in which an established artist compiles their most popular songs into an album. Like many Australian rap groups, The Funkoars are relatively unheard of and to this day are far from being known as an Australian household name, unlike their Obese Records associates, Hilltop Hoods. This album title could also be seen as a playful exaggeration, comparing their group to famous artists, who release greatest hits albums to monetize once again on previously charted singles. The tongue-in-cheek exaggeration of the album title makes more sense in the third track, The Greatest Skit, where group member 'Trials' exclaims during a post-performance backstage skit that the group only received 25 dollars in profit from the live show they performed.

== Track listing ==
Except where otherwise noted, all tracks written by MC Hons, MC Sesta and MC Trials.

1. "Hurro" – 2:23
2. "Da Na Na" – 3:52
3. "The Greatest Skit" (composer information unknown) – 1:19
4. "The Greatest Hit" – 3:39
5. "Blackout" (Sesta, Trials) – 4:00
6. "You Know It" – 3:17
7. "The Symphony" (featuring Vents) (Hons, Sesta, Trials, Vents) – 3:47
8. "Swank Stedly Presents..." (composer information unknown) – 1:51
9. "C.O.T.Y" – 3:58
10. "And Now for Something Completely Different" – 3:23
11. "Sesta vs. Pressure" (composer information unknown) – 1:16
12. "What I Want" (featuring Hilltop Hoods) (Hons, Pressure, Sesta, Suffa, Trials) – 4:30
13. "Masterpiece" – 3:31
14. "Meet the Family" (featuring Pegz) (Hons, Pegz, Sesta, Trials) – 3:13
15. "The Reason" – 4:42

== Release history ==
Region	Date	Format	Label	Catalogue
Australia	17 July 2006	CD; 2xLP; digital download	Obese Records	OBR 046
