= Briggs (rapper) =

Aboriginal Australian rapper (born 1986)

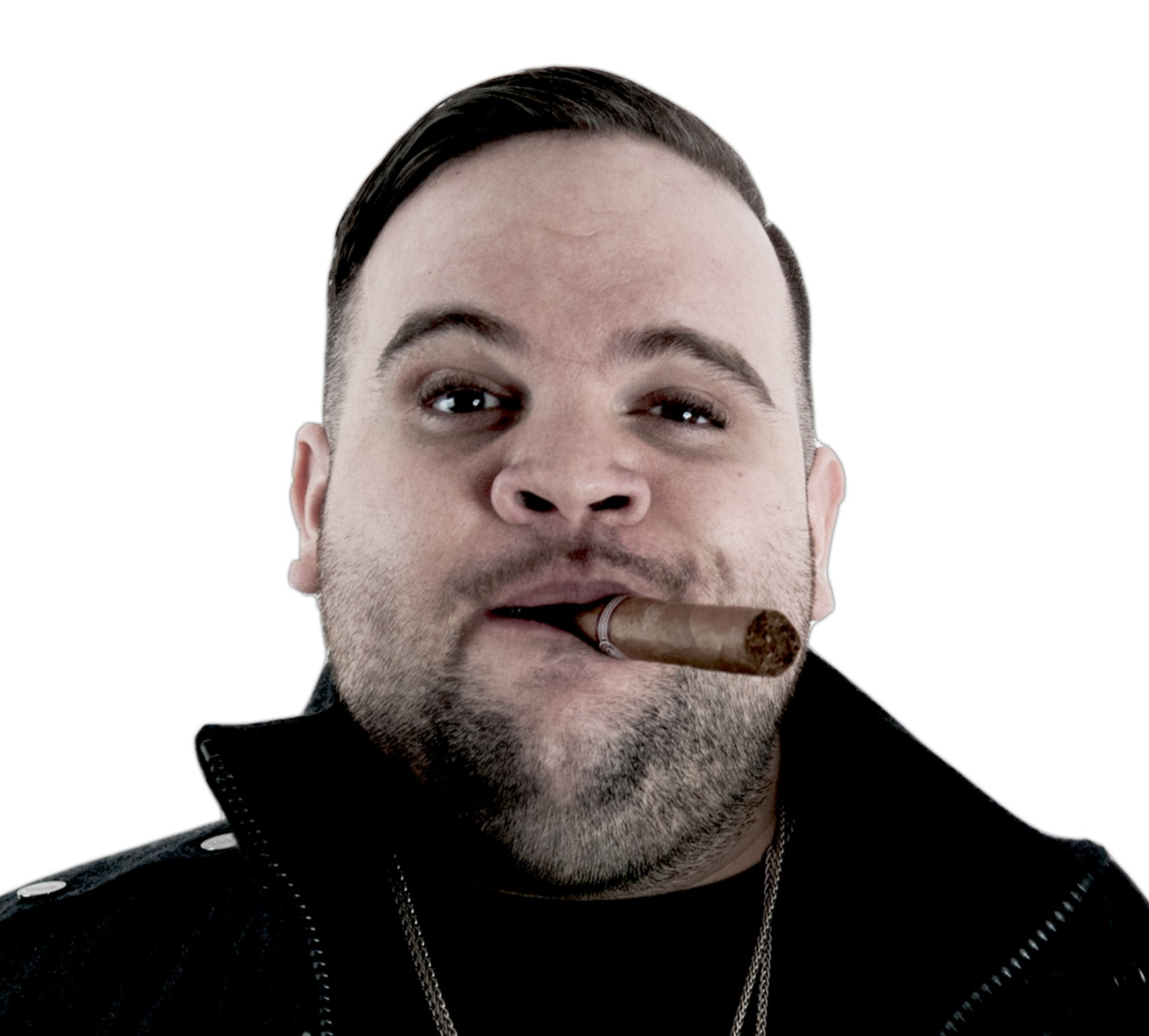
- Briggs in 2013

Background information
- Also known as: Senator Briggs, Briggs The Milkman
- Born: Adam Briggs; 28 August 1986 (age 40); Shepparton, Victoria, Australia
- Genres: Hip-hop, hardcore punk
- Occupations: Rapper, record label owner, actor, author, writer
- Instrument: Vocals
- Years active: 2005–present
- Labels: Bad Apples Music; Golden Era Records
- Member of: A.B. Original, Big Noter
- Website: Golden Era Records artist page

Adam Briggs (born 28 August 1986), known professionally by the mononym Briggs, is an Aboriginal Australian (Yorta Yorta) rapper, record label owner, comedy writer, actor, and author. Briggs became well known as a solo artist, signing with Golden Era Records in 2009, before co-founding the hip hop duo A.B. Original in 2016 with Trials from the Funkoars. In 2025, Briggs debuted a new hardcore punk project, Big Noter.

As a solo artist, Briggs has released one EP, Homemade Bombs in 2009, and two albums: 2010's The Blacklist and 2014's Sheplife. He has made appearances on songs with Hilltop Hoods, the Funkoars, Drapht, and The Last Kinection, as well as supporting a number of international artists. In 2015, Briggs founded his own record label, Bad Apples Music, which has signed several Indigenous hip-hop artists and houses A.B. Original.

Extending his career beyond music, Briggs has appeared in several television series on ABC: as a writer and actor for the second season of the sketch comedy Black Comedy in 2016; playing the role of Maliyan in the drama series Cleverman in the same year; and becoming a regular cast member on news satire program The Weekly with Charlie Pickering in 2017.

== Early life and education ==
Briggs was born on 28 August 1986 and grew up with his family in Shepparton, a city in rural Victoria, Australia.

He is an Aboriginal Australian of the Yorta Yorta people and the tribe name is tattooed on his forearms. His father was from Cummeragunja. He has stated in an interview with G&T magazine that the tattoo's purpose is "so every time I rock the mic people know that I am representing."

Briggs was a student at Shepparton High School and Wanganui Park Secondary College, where he briefly played guitar in a punk band prior to his involvement with hip hop. He also worked as a security guard at Shepparton's Yahoo Bar venue. Briggs explained in a December 2013 interview that making a name for himself in Shepparton, for a range of reasons, was not difficult and the area was actually a reminder of the larger experience that was open to him and the diligence required to become involved with a music scene that was more significant.

== Music ==
=== 2005–2009: Independent artist, Homemade Bombs EP ===
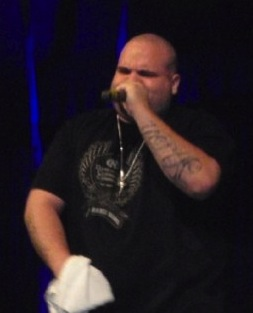
Briggs at Festival Hall, Melbourne, in December 2009

Briggs initially became attracted to American rap music, and formed a group named Misdemeanour with schoolmate Peter Shiels. After renaming the group "912" (a combination of their house numbers), they performed a gig in Melbourne with Australian hip hop artist Reason. Briggs later recalled that Reason was one of the first MCs that he had heard rapping with an Australian accent. Upon seeing the 19-year-old Briggs perform, Reason invited him to join an Obese Records record label tour to undertake a role as the established artist's "hype man" (similar to a back-up singer). Reason explained:

I was pretty taken aback by this ... this big fella with so much energy and so much passion standing up there, proud of his ... his world of Shepp, and rapping in a way that, you know, is so comparable to some of the greats, some of the more powerful MCs, you know, that I've followed over the years. And he was only 19 years of age.

Briggs then moved to the Melbourne suburb of St Kilda so that he could more easily access contacts in the local hip hop community. While in Melbourne, he struggled to pay rent with the social security benefits that he was reliant upon − Reason stated on the Message Stick TV program that this period was beneficial, as it provided Briggs with an insight that has assisted his growth since that time. Briggs later stated in December 2013 that sacrifice is the "cornerstone" of his career, and his time in Melbourne was greatly representative of the scant lifestyle that defined his time in the capital city.

Briggs independently released his first EP Homemade Bombs in 2009 with the support of a monetary loan from Hilltop Hoods' MC Suffa. The recording included the song "Bad Move", for which a video clip was produced, and a collaboration with Reason that is titled "My Priority".

=== 2009–2013: Golden Era Records, The Blacklist ===
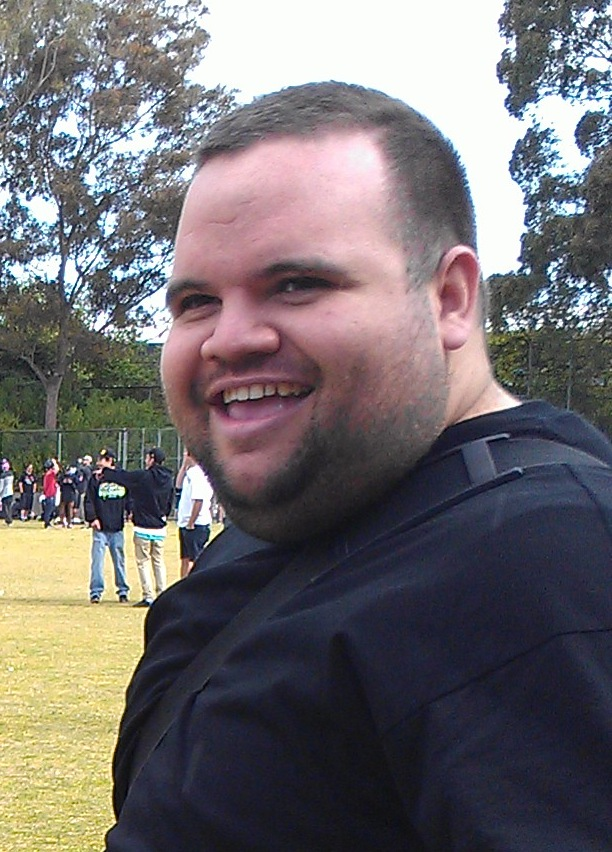
Briggs in October 2012

The Hilltop Hoods signed Briggs to their Golden Era record label and invited him to be the support act on their 2009 European tour. Briggs accepted the tour invitation and the European trip represented the artist's first time overseas.

Briggs' debut full-length album The Blacklist was released in 2010 on Golden Era and included the single "The Wrong Brother" that was inspired by an incident in which Briggs was stopped from entering a Shepparton pub by security officers, only to be told, "Sorry mate, we got the wrong brother." Suffa appears in the music video for the song as a record label manager. The album also included the tracks "So Dangerous", with Trials (of Funkoars), and "I Wish". Briggs later revealed that he "didn't expect" the public's response to the album, which included a #3 ranking on the Australian iTunes hip-hop charts that lasted a duration of four days.

In October 2010, Briggs was the seventh MC to participate in the Rapper Tag series of videos that featured Australian rappers who had been "tagged" by Newsense.

In June 2012, Briggs was featured on the ABC Television Indigenous affairs program Message Stick. The episode included interviews with Reason, Suffa and Trials.

Briggs released his single "Rather Be Dead" on 27 July 2012 and uploaded a corresponding film clip onto his YouTube channel "BriggsTheMilkman" the previous day—as of September 2012, the video had received over 30,000 views. The single was added to playlists on Australian youth radio station Triple J—it was featured on the playlist of the Home and Hosed program on 26 June 2012 and then appeared on The Hip Hop Show on 2 July 2012.

Briggs initially announced the release schedule for his second album as late 2012; however, in October 2012, the artist revealed that this had changed to early 2013.

In addition to appearing on the Golden Era Mixtape 2011 and Golden Era Mixtape 2013, Briggs hosted the Golden Era Mixtape 2012.

In May 2013, Briggs and Jaytee launched a podcast available via iTunes. On 20 May 2013, Briggs used an image from the John Hughes film Planes, Trains, and Automobiles for a promotional post for the podcast on his Facebook fan page.

=== 2014: Sheplife ===
Briggs commenced the recording of his second album, titled "ShepLife", in 2012. Briggs coined the term "ShepLife" as a reference to the local lifestyle in his hometown of Shepparton. Briggs has used the hashtag "#sheplife" on Twitter, written a song titled "#sheplife" that appears on the Golden Era Mixtape 2012 and released beanies emblazoned with "ShepLife". In an online interview, he explained the intention behind the album in relation to that of The Blacklist:

It was a pretty aggressive record. I said to Jay[tee Hazard, Briggs’ production partner] when I was working on stuff for the ShepLife album, "If The Blacklist was the punch in the face, ShepLife is why I punched you in the face." Shep Life's kinda like the prequel.

A promotional video for the title song of Sheplife was released on Briggs' YouTube channel on 19 August 2014—the video is directed by Oli Sansom and produced by Michelle Grace Hunder. The video consists of footage filmed in Shepparton, including sections in which Briggs is rapping in the back seat of a driving car.

Briggs' second album Sheplife was released on 22 August 2014 through Golden Era Records. The first single, "The Hunt", was released on 11 July 2014 and features a collaboration with Indigenous Australian artist Gurrumul. The corresponding music video for the first single was published on YouTube on 17 July 2014 and the two artists performed the song live for NAIDOC Week at the studios of the triple j radio station on 10 July 2014.

"Bad Apples" was the second single released from Sheplife and the corresponding music video was published on Briggs' YouTube channel on 27 August 2014. The video was filmed near Briggs' home town of Shepparton "at the crossroads just by the Murchison East Railway Hotel & Train station, an iconic and humble piece of history which sadly has since burnt down." In an October 2014 radio interview with the Australian Broadcasting Corporation (ABC), Briggs provided further insight into the song:

That's just how I think all the time. I'm just angry ... all the time. That's not a one-off ... But it's definitely not finished yet. I'm not done talking about that yet. And that's what's important to understand: with Sheplife, I've put a lot on the table, right? But, now that it's on the table, it doesn't mean there's a weight lifted off my shoulders. It's just that now I've put it on the table, it's gotta be talked about ... So, the discussion is there—I tried to not "beat around the bush" with "Bad Apples" and that was my ultimate goal: to make a track that was "in your face". That was scary for some people. That did make some people squirm; make some people think. I wanted to put that fear back in hip hop. That voice, you know, that fist back into rap music, because I hadn't seen it in this country for so long.

Briggs released the music video of a collaborative song with Sydney-based artist Joyride on 9 October 2014. Featured on Briggs' YouTube channel, the video is co-directed by Briggs and the song is described as "all about skipping the honeymoon period and getting right into the plateau of the relationship—where none of the magic happens." Titled "Mike Tyson Love Thing", the song is produced by Western Australian artist Dazastah of SBX.

As part of a series of media appearances that occurred throughout 2014, Briggs was selected as an "IndigenousX" guest by the Guardian publication in mid-November. The IndigenousX series is based on a Twitter account—@IndigenousX—and the tagline "Our stories, our way". Guests are responsible for the series' Twitter account for a one-week duration, and are asked "to discuss topics of interest to them as Aboriginal and/or Torres Strait Islander people"—Kaleesha Morris and Mark Ella are examples of previous guests. In his introductory interview, Briggs described himself as "An introvert with an extrovert's career." He used the account to live-tweet his reaction to the SBS documentary series First Contact about six Australians who are challenged about their perceptions of Indigenous Australians.

As a prelude to Briggs' second Sheplife remix competition, a "Squad Remix" of the album song "Golden Era" was uploaded onto the Golden Era Records SoundCloud profile on 27 November 2014. Featuring the Hilltop Hoods, K21, Funkoars and Vents, the remix was described as venomous by the Tone Deaf website, due to the lyrical content. Contestants are required to download vocals file, in addition to other material, from the SoundCloud page to produce their entry. The first "#KingOfTheTown" remix contest was for rappers and was won by Sydney MC Sarah Connor in early September 2014.

=== 2015–present: Bad Apples Music, A.B. Original ===
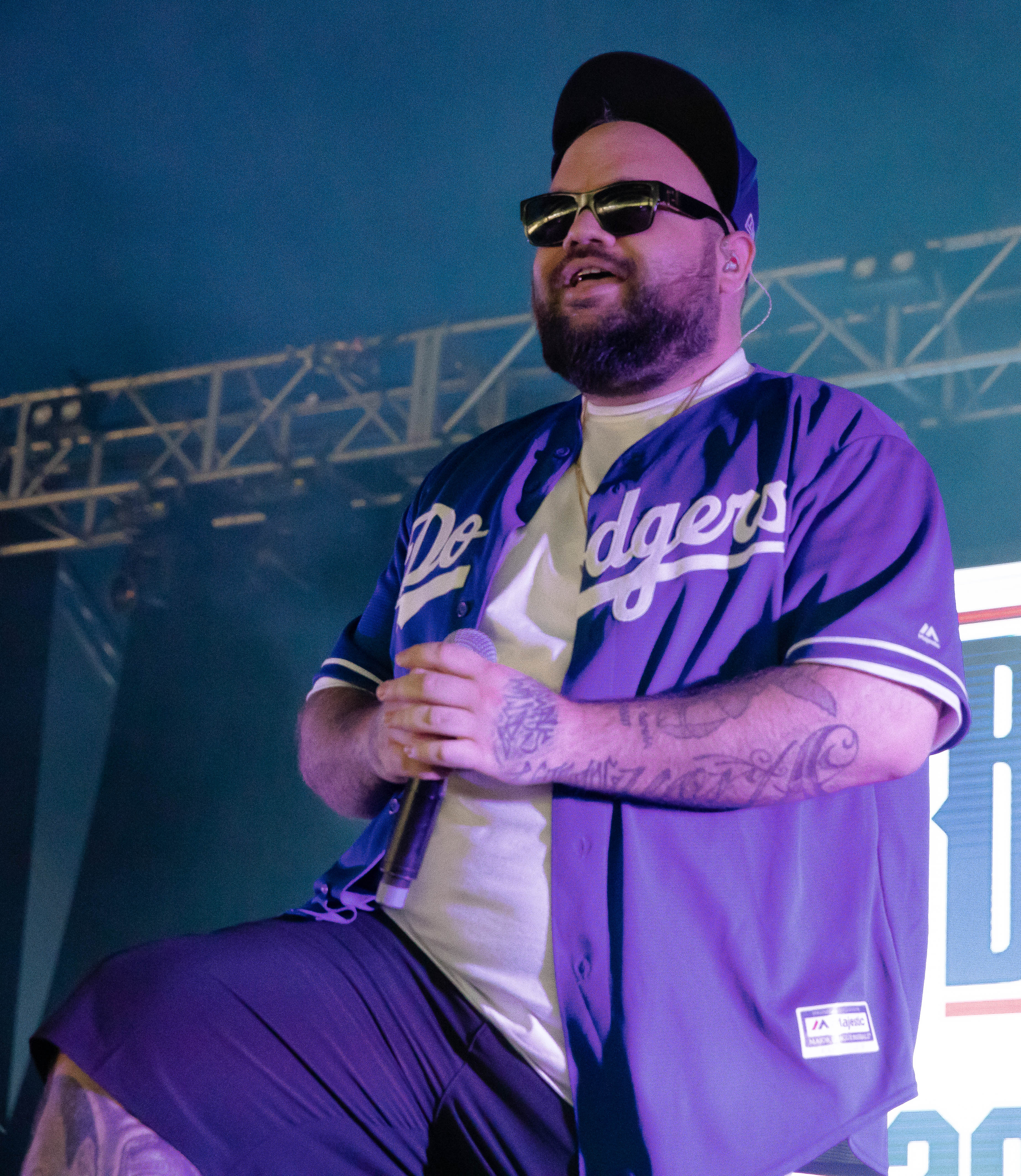
Briggs in January 2019

In 2015, Briggs founded his own record label, Bad Apples Music. The label has signed three Indigenous hip-hop artists: Birdz, Nooky and Philly.

In 2016, Briggs also formed a side project with Trials of the Funkoars, named A.B. Original, which also forms part of the Bad Apples label. A.B. Original supported Hilltop Hoods on their 2016 "Restrung" tour. In November 2016, A.B Original released their debut album, Reclaim Australia (named after the nationalist anti-Islam group that has held public rallies of the same name) and has shot to the top 10 albums on Australian iTunes. The album has been described as "angry, polemical, brutally frank and meant to inspire a response, good or bad" and features a variety of different Indigenous music artists, such as Geoffrey Gurrumul Yunupingu, Dan Sultan and Thelma Plum. The duo also performed the song, Dumb Things, with Paul Kelly in the Triple J studios. This version of the song makes reference to Invasion Day, abuse of children in the Don Dale detention centre in the NT, Asylum seekers and blackface.

In 2018, Briggs collaborated with Dan Sultan on Killer Under a Blood Moon, produced and recorded by Jan Skubiszewski. The album was nominated for two ARIA awards and debuted at number 5 on the ARIA Albums Chart.

Briggs also appeared on the ABC's Cleverman as Maliyan. The A. B. Original song "Take Me Home", featuring Gurrumul Yunupingu, was written for and serves as the opening title, and is played throughout the show's first season.

In 2020, Briggs released EP Always Was, the title referencing the slogan "Always was, always will be" which he first heard as a child at protests and in relation to being present as Aboriginal people.

In 2023, Briggs conceived of a new festival, Now & Forever, rallying support for the “yes” vote in the 2023 Australian Indigenous Voice Referendum, with A.B. Original, Baker Boy, Barkaa, Emma Donovan, Hilltop Hoods, Jimmy Barnes, Mo'Ju, and Paul Kelly performing.

In 2025, Briggs released music under the name Big Noter. In September 2026, the album Songs in the Key of Wrestling was be released.

== Touring ==
Also in late 2010, Briggs was the support act on the Australian tour of American hip hop MC Ice Cube, who Briggs described as "my favourite rapper since I was a kid." Also in late 2010, Briggs supported Perth MC Drapht on his "Rapunzel" tour.

In early 2012, Briggs supported Alabama rapper Yelawolf on his Australian tour. In late 2012, Briggs toured alongside Horrorshow, as both were support acts for the Hilltop Hoods. Together with South Australian MC K21 and former mentor Reason, Briggs was announced as the support act for the Melbourne performance of Jeru The Damaja.

An Australian tour in support of the Sheplife album, with "special guest" Hau Latukefu, occurred in October and November 2014. American hip hop and spoken word artist Sage Francis selected Briggs as the main support act for the Melbourne and Sydney shows of his December 2014 Australian tour.

In the live arena, Briggs has supported international artists such as Ice Cube, KRS-One, Necro, Ghostface Killah, Dilated Peoples, M.O.P., and Pharoahe Monch.

== Musical style and influences ==
Briggs describes himself as a "rapper" and does not see the term as problematic, citing Kanye West as an artist he listens to. He has named The Dixie Chicks, Keith Urban, Janet Jackson and Katy Perry as older influences, but also stated that he listens to contemporary American artists such as Justin Timberlake and R Kelly. Briggs has identified Australian artists The Living End, The Veronicas, Operator Please, Alex Lloyd, Grinspoon, Kisschasy, One Dollar Short and Pete Murray as influences.

During his experience of finalising Sheplife, Briggs explained that his songwriting is "sporadic":

I don't have a set process, sometimes I get a beat and I work from that. Other times I'm driving my car and get an idea and start to work on something from there. The inspiration can come from anywhere. My writing is very honest, I just try to capture that moment as best as I can.

In terms of his sound and style, Briggs described an evolving process in late 2013, whereby his sound has become "loud, aggressive, hostile and endearing at the same time". However, he also uses the term "thoughtful" to describe the sound of his second album, and explained: "I am a lot more focused, I have a lot more direction. I'm still angry it's just more mature now. I have a better idea of the sound I want to create and legacy I want to leave."

The Yorta-Yorta culture is also influential on Briggs's songwriting according to the MC:

I feel I represent my blood in everything I do, not just music. I don't feel the need to wave a flag in someone's face at every chance I get because I'm already me ... I have my tribe tattooed on my arms and 2 Black, 2 Strong on my wrists. But that's me representing my people how I want. Not everyone is going to understand my path, or my journey and they don't have to. As long as I'm doing what I know is right and hold myself and my people to the esteem they deserve, no one can question me.

Briggs further explained in a November 2014 interview that his Yorta-Yorta heritage means that he represents "a long line of story tellers".

In terms of role models, Briggs identified his family in November 2014, with an emphasis placed upon his father and uncles, as they were central in his upbringing. Briggs explained that his familial ties provide him with a strong sense of security, "because if I'm right by them [family] I don't need to worry." In the same interview, Briggs also spoke of the subjects that he most passionately explores through his music:

Self-esteem and goal accomplishment are two big issues I'd like to address—the idea and power of “choice” also, to reach goals and a sense of pride in your identity. These are the issues I was closest to growing up so these are the issues that really hit home for me.

== Television ==
Briggs has appeared in several television series on ABC: as a writer and actor for the second season of the sketch comedy Black Comedy in 2016; playing the role of Maliyan in the drama series Cleverman in the same year; and becoming a regular cast member on news satire program The Weekly with Charlie Pickering in 2017.

He is also a writer on the Netflix animated sitcom Disenchantment.

Briggs plays the role of Alex Bermuda in the 2024 Netflix drama Boy Swallows Universe.

== Community representation ==
Briggs hosted a concert that was co-ordinated by Shepparton organisation "Word and Mouth", in which local young artists from indigenous and refugee backgrounds participated in performances.

Briggs played for the Eastside Kings team in the 2012 Robert Hunter Cup, an Australian rules football match organised to honour the memory of Australian hip hop MC Hunter. Originally from Western Australia and a member of the Syllabolix crew, Hunter died from cancer in October 2011. The Cup event, which was inspired by an impromptu "kick-to-kick" game at a wake near the Melbourne Cricket Ground, was timed to coincide with the anniversary of Hunter's death and raised funds for Australian cancer charity CanTeen.

== Children's book ==
In May 2020, Briggs released a children's book 'Our Home, Our Heartbeat'. The book became the best-selling children's book in Australia in June 2020. It won the 2021 Australian Book Industry Award for Children's Picture Book of the Year.

== Personal life ==
Following his time as a resident of Melbourne, Briggs returned to his hometown of Shepparton in 2010. Briggs has explained, "I like being back home, with all my cousins and my friends who I grew up with – they keep me honest." Briggs then relocated to Melbourne for the second time in 2014, and provided a further insight into his experience of Shepparton following the move.

In May 2012, Briggs welcomed a daughter, Kora, and explained in November 2014 that, in terms of the future, he strives for "a better Australia and a better world for my daughter."

In a February 2014 interview, Briggs stated that he is separated from his daughter's mother and used the analogy of "spinning plates" to describe the process of balancing work and family life. Briggs also articulated his paradoxical experience of parenthood, whereby he feels both strengthened and made vulnerable.

Briggs' nephew, Jack Ison, is a professional Australian Rules Footballer with the Carlton Football Club.

== Discography ==
=== Studio albums ===
List of studio albums released, with selected details shown
Title	Album details	Peak chart positions
Title	Album details	AUS
The Blacklist	Released: 1 January 2010; Label: Golden Era Records, Universal Australia; Formats: CD, digital download	—
Sheplife	Released: 22 August 2014; Label: Golden Era Records, Universal Australia; Formats: CD, digital download, streaming	—
Songs in the Key of Wrestling (as Big Noter)	Released: 18 September 2026; Label: Island Records Australia; Formats: Digital download, streaming	30

=== EPs ===
List of extended plays released, with release date and label details shown
Title	Details
Homemade Bombs	Released: 20 January 2017; Label: Bad Apples Music; Formats: Digital download, streaming
Always Was	Scheduled: 21 August 2020; Label: Self-released; Formats: Digital download, streaming

=== Singles ===
==== As lead artist ====
List of singles, with year released and album details shown
Title	Year	Album
"The Wrong Brother"	2010	The Blacklist
"So Dangerous" (featuring Trials)	2010	The Blacklist
"The Hunt" (featuring Gurrumul)	2014	Sheplife
"The Children Came Back" (with Gurrumul and Dewayne Everettsmith)	2015	Non-album singles
"2016 Golden Era Cypher" (with Hilltop Hoods, Funkoars, A.B. Original, Vents, K21 & Purpose)	2016	Non-album singles
"Here" (featuring Caiti Baker)	2017	Non-album singles
"Life is Incredible" (featuring Greg Holden)	2019	Briggs for PM
"Housefyre" (featuring Tim Minchin)	2020	Briggs for PM
"Extra Extra"	2020	Always Was
"Go to War" (featuring Thelma Plum)	2020	Always Was
"Good Morning" (featuring MUKI)	2020	Always Was
"Shadows" (featuring Troy Cassar-Daley)	2021	
"Ballad of the Goats" (with Kobie Dee)	2024	
"Munarra" (with Sprout	2024	
"Identity" (as Big Noter)	2025	Songs in the Key of Wrestling
"Freak Out" (with Baker Boy and Haiku Hands)	2025	Djandjay
"Talk Straight" (as Big Noter)	2025	Songs in the Key of Wrestling
"F.M.D." (as Big Noter)	2026	Songs in the Key of Wrestling
"Big Noter" (as Big Noter)	2026	Songs in the Key of Wrestling

=== Guest appearances ===
List of non-single appearances
Title	Year	Artist(s)	Album
"Ain't No Place"	2009	Eloquor featuring Briggs	Move Up
"Game Time"	2010	Maundz featuring Briggs	Mr. Nobody
"Burning Bridges"	2011	The Last Kinection featuring Briggs	Next of Kin
"The Eulogy"	2011	Drapht featuring Briggs	The Life of Riley
"Let It Burn"	2011	Golden Era Records	Golden Era Mixtape 2011
"The People's Champ"	2011	Golden Era Records	Golden Era Mixtape 2011
"Lunchroom Table"	2011	with Trials, Suffa and Sesta	Golden Era Mixtape 2011
"Keep that Mouth Shut"	2012	Tornts featuring Briggs	Concrete Slang
"The Joint"	2012	Clandestien featuring Briggs	Weapons Grade
"#Sheplife"	2012	Golden Era Records	Golden Era Mixtape 2012
"The Underground" (Suffa remix)	2012	Hilltop Hoods	The Good Life in the Sun

== Awards and nominations ==
=== AIR Awards ===
The Australian Independent Record Awards (commonly known informally as AIR Awards) is an annual awards night to recognise, promote and celebrate the success of Australia's Independent Music sector.

Year	Nominee / work	Award	Result
2015	himself	Breakthrough Independent Artist	Nominated
2015	Sheplife	Best Independent Hip Hop/Urban Album	Nominated

=== APRA Music Awards ===
The APRA Awards are presented annually from 1982 by the Australasian Performing Right Association (APRA), "honouring composers and songwriters".

Year	Nominee / work	Award	Result	Ref.
2018	Adam Briggs / Daniel Rankine	Songwriter of the Year	Won	
2019	"Blaccout" (Adam Briggs / Daniel Rankine)	Song of the Year	Shortlisted	

=== ARIA Music Awards ===
The ARIA Music Awards is an annual awards ceremony that recognises excellence, innovation, and achievement across all genres of Australian music. They commenced in 1987.

Year	Nominee / work	Award	Result	Ref.
2019	"Life is Incredible" (Dylan River)	Best Video	Nominated	
2020	Always Was	Best Hip Hop Release	Nominated	
2025	Briggs – Paramount+ Australia: Ballad of the GOATS (Paramount+ Australia)	Best Use of an Australian Recording in an Advertisement	Nominated	

=== The Deadly Awards ===
The Deadly Awards, commonly known simply as The Deadlys, was an annual celebration of Australian Aboriginal and Torres Strait Islander achievement in music, sport, entertainment and community. The ran from 1995 to 2013.

Year	Nominee / work	Award	Result
2011	"The Wrong Brother"	Best Singles	Nominated
2012.	himself	Hip Hop Artist of the Year	Nominated

=== Environmental Music Prize ===
The Environmental Music Prize is a quest to find a theme song to inspire action on climate and conservation. It commenced in 2022.

Year	Nominee / work	Award	Result	Ref.
2022	"Housefyre" (with Tim Minchin)	Environmental Music Prize	Nominated	

=== J Awards ===
The J Awards are an annual series of Australian music awards that were established by the Australian Broadcasting Corporation's youth-focused radio station Triple J. They commenced in 2005.

Year	Nominee / work	Award	Result	Ref.
2015	"The Children Came Back"	Australian Video of the Year	Nominated	
2019	"Life Is Incredible"	Australian Video of the Year	Nominated	
2023	Briggs	Double J Artist of the Year	Won	

=== Music Victoria Awards ===
The Music Victoria Awards, are an annual awards night celebrating Victorian music. They commenced in 2005.

Year	Nominee / work	Award	Result
2014	Shep Life	Best Hip Hop Album	Won
2014	himself	Best Regional Act	Nominated
2015	himself	Best Male Artist	Nominated
2015	himself	Best Indigenous Act	Nominated
2015	himself	Best Regional Act	Nominated
2016	himself	Best Male Artist	Nominated
2019	"Life is Incredible"	Best Song	Nominated
2020	himself	Best Solo Artist	Nominated
2021	themselves	Best Hip Hop Act	Nominated

=== National Indigenous Music Awards ===
The National Indigenous Music Awards recognise excellence, innovation and leadership among Aboriginal and Torres Strait Islander musicians from throughout Australia. They commenced in 2004.

Year	Nominee / work	Award	Result
2014	himself	Best New Talent	Won
2015	himself	Artist of the Year	Nominated
2015	Sheplife	Album of the Year	Won
2015	Sheplife	Cover Art of the Year	Nominated
2015	"Bad Apples"	Film Clip of the Year	Won
2015	"Bad Apples"	Song of the Year	Nominated
2016	"The Children Came Back" (with Dewayne Everettsmith & Gurrumul)	Song of the Year	Won
2016	"The Children Came Back" (with Dewayne Everettsmith & Gurrumul)	Film Clip of the Year	Nominated
2019	himself	Artist of the Year	Nominated
2019	"Life is Incredible"	Film Clip of the Year	Won
2020	"HouseFyre" (with Tim Minchin)	Song of the Year	Nominated
2020	"HouseFyre" (with Tim Minchin)	Film Clip of the Year	Nominated
