= The Hangover (Funkoars album) =

Studio album by Funkoars
- Released: 29 November 2008
- Genre: Hip hop
- Length: 53:50
- Label: Peepshow Entertainment
- Producer: Adam Baker (Sesta); Daniel Rankine (Trials)

Funkoars chronology
The Greatest Hits (2006)	The Hangover (2008)	The Quickening (2011)

Singles from The Hangover
- 1. "Black Sally" Released: 20 September 2008

The Hangover is the third studio album from South Australian hip hop artists, Funkoars. The album was released on 29 November 2008 on the group's own label, Peepshow Entertainment.

The album peaked at number 57 on the ARIA Charts, becoming the band's first charting album.

Professional ratings
Review scores
Source	Rating
Beat magazine	link
Check the Rhime	link

== Track listing ==
All songs written by Daniel Yates, Daniel Rankine, Matt Honson and Adam Baker, except where noted.

1. "More of the Raw" – 3:23
2. "The Hangover" – 3:47
3. "Black Sally" (featuring Maurice Greer) (D. Yates, M. Honson, D. Rankine, A. Baker and James Aforozis) – 4:17
4. "Show Money" – 3:48
5. "Bootleg It" (featuring DJ Adfu) (D. Yates, M. Honson, D. Rankine, A. Baker and Fuad) – 4:19
6. "The Phallic Menace" – 3:17
7. "What’s your Malfunction" – 4:21
8. "Double Dutch" (featuring Hilltop Hoods and Vents) (D. Yates, M. Honson, D. Rankine, A. Baker, D. Smith and M. Lambert) – 4:28
9. "Reign on the Masses" – 3:41
10. "This is How" (featuring Masta Ace) – 3:35
11. "Let you Go" – 3:23
12. "Never Coming Back" (D. Yates, D. Rankine and A. Baker) – 4:08
13. "Do it Together" (D. Yates, M. Honson, D. Rankine, A. Baker and M. Lambert) – 3:24
14. "Lock me Up" – 3:59

== Charts ==
Chart (2008)	Peak position
Australian (ARIA Charts)	57

== Release history ==
Region	Date	Format	Label	Catalogue
Australia	November 2008	CD; 2xLP; digital download	Peepshow Entertainment	PS003
