= Trials (musician) =

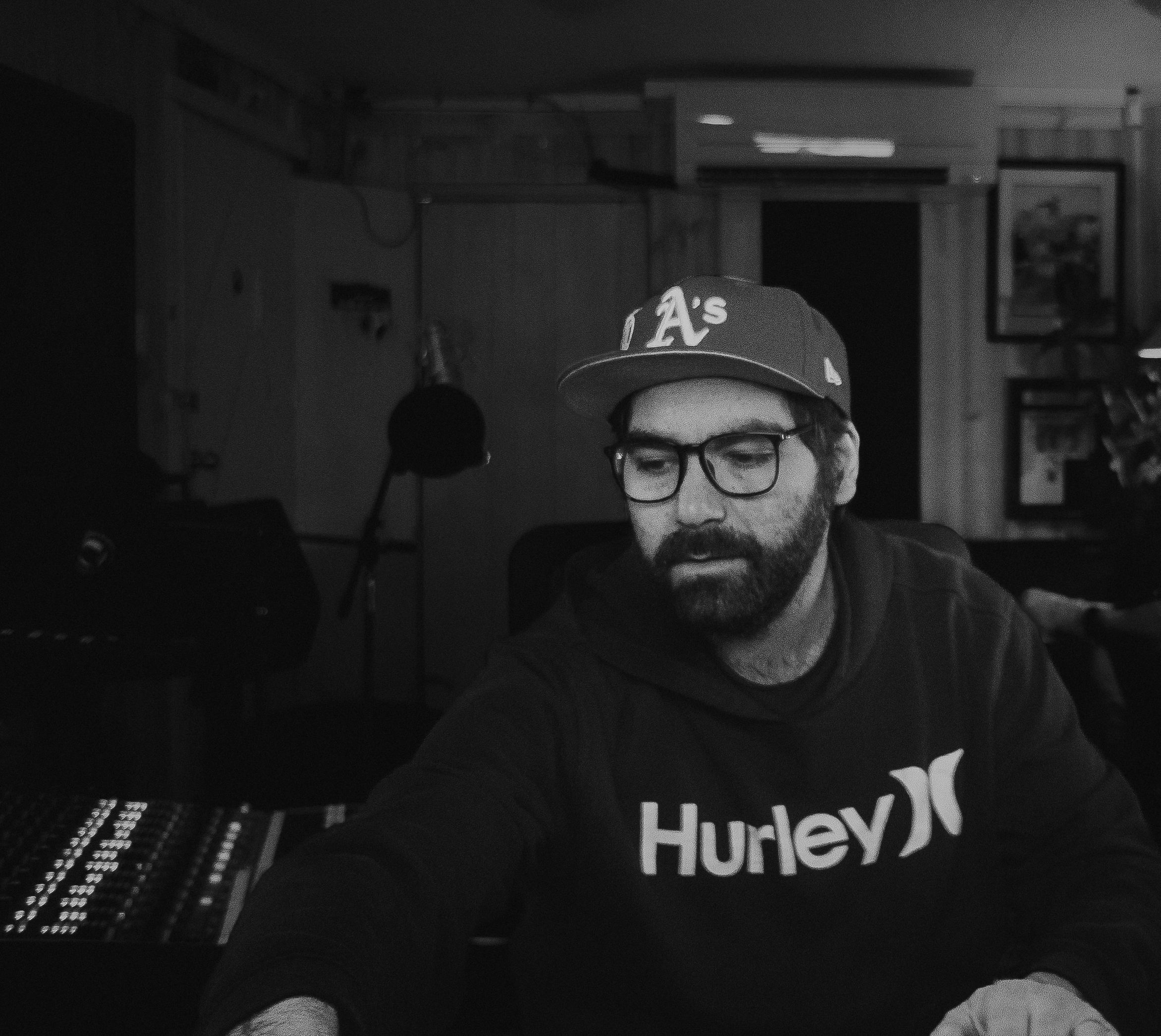
- Trials working on an SSL console at Wundenberg Studios in Adelaide (2022)

Background information
- Born: Daniel Hendle Rankine; Adelaide, Australia
- Origin: South Australia
- Genre: Hip hop
- Occupations: Rapper; songwriter; record producer
- Years active: 2000-present
- Label: Universal Records | Island Records
- Member of: A.B. Original
- Formerly of: Funkoars
- Website: producedbytrials.com.au

Daniel Hendle Rankine, known professionally as Trials, is an Australian rapper, songwriter, record producer, artist, and writer. Hailing from Adelaide, South Australia, his first band was Funkoars in 1999. Trials' work includes collaborations, co-writes, and production of tracks with a range of artists and genres, including Gurrumul, Archie Roach, DZ Deathrays, and Paul Kelly. In particular, he has worked extensively with hip hop artist Briggs, forming half of the duo A.B. Original from around 2016. In 2020, Trials signed to Island Records Australia and Universal Music Australia. His first solo album, released in May 2026, is hendle.

Trials, who is Aboriginal Australian, also teaches at the Centre for Aboriginal Studies in Music at Adelaide University, paints, and is writing an autobiography.

== Early life and education ==
Daniel Hendle Rankine was born to a Welsh mother and Ngarrindjeri father. His paternal ancestors are from Raukkan, an Aboriginal community at the end of the Murray River near Adelaide, and his middle name is that of his paternal grandfather.

His father was abusive, and his mother was forced to flee the home with her son. His father served a prison sentence, and his parents split up when he was three years old. Trials moved to the south of Wales with his mother, where he experienced racism at school. His mother was a social worker, as was his stepfather, who is also Black. He returned to Australia when he was 12, and was shocked to find racist attitudes prevailing in Australia too.

In the late 1990s, at the age of 16, Rankine was involved in a car accident along with his brothers near their home in the southern suburbs of Adelaide. went through the windscreen of the car and broke his arms. The driver of the other car was speeding and at fault, and gave Trials $5,000. Rankine used the money to buy Technics 1200s turntables, a computer and a microphone, which started him on his musical career path as Trials.

== Career ==
=== Making music ===
In 1999, Trials began his musical career at 16 with Adam Baker (Sesta) and Matt Honson (Hons), collectively known as Funkoars. DJ Daniel Yates (a.k.a. Reflux), was also a band member. They released their debut album Who's Your Step Daddy in 2003. The group has been on hiatus since 2016.

In the early 2000s, Trials met rapper Briggs at a Funkoars gig at the Corner Hotel in Melbourne. During the recording of the Golden Era Mixtape (2011-2013), a label the pair were signed to individually at the time, Trials began working on demos with his Briggs that would eventually become the foundations of A.B. Original in 2016. Briggs moved into Trials' house and they went on to form acclaimed hip-hop group A.B. Original. A.B Original received an APRA Award in 2018 for Songwriter of the Year.

Trials' work includes collaborations, co-writes, and production of tracks with a range of artists and genres, including Drapht, Gurrumul, Archie Roach, Hilltop Hoods, Pete Murray, Seth Sentry, Illy, DZ Deathrays, Paul Kelly, Thelma Plum, Mo'Ju, and Dune Rats.

Trials released his first solo song, "I'm a f**king wreck" in 2020. The song's lyrics are self-deprecating confessional thoughts. The track is a collaboration with US rapper, Daniyel. Daniyel and Trials first worked together collaborating on Daniyel's debut album. In July 2020, Trials signed to Island Records Australia and Universal Music Australia to release his debut solo album.

He has produced and composed music for film and television, including programs Cleverman, Looky Looky – Here Comes Cooky, Cargo (Netflix), and The Warriors. His music has also appeared in advertisements for the MMA, NBL and NBA, as well as fighting and surfing documentaries.

He contributed to Yurikurringa Ngadluku Paltirna: Listen to Our Songs!, a book of songs in the Kaurna language published in 2025 by the University of Adelaide and various partners.

In May 2026, Trials released his debut solo album, hendle, comprising 10 tracks of "hip hop juxtaposed a bouncy beat", which includes autobiographical elements. The songs tell of the abuse he experienced as a child, his relationship to religion ("or lack thereof"), and his path to sobriety. His son, daughter, and wife all contributed to the album. The album, which has an overarching theme of overcoming adversity and developing resilience, was preceded by a string of double singles: "You could never hate me like i do / What's the colour of love?" released 12 February 2026, "Whistle while i walk / Pollywaffle" on 20 March 2026, and "Be an adult (have a breakdown) / ...then i got dressed" on 10 April 2026. "Pollywaffle" does not refer to the Poly Waffle, but rather to boring small talk.

=== CASM ===
In June 2026, Trials started mentoring students at the Centre for Aboriginal Studies in Music (CASM) at Adelaide University. He is the first Indigenous producer at CASM in 15 years. During the period of his appointment, he will continue to contribute to the Kaurna Songbook, along with community projects in prisons and other places.

== Other activities ==
Trials also paints (as of May 2026, he had produced a series of 20 acrylic paintings), and has been writing an autobiography.

== Personal life ==
Trials has struggled with addiction in the past, but became sober and takes his responsibilities as a father seriously. He has a son and a daughter.

== Discography ==
=== Albums ===
List of albums, with selected details
Title	Details	Peak chart positions
Title	Details	AUS
Cargo (Original Soundtrack)	Released: November 2018; Format: Digital; Label: Causeway, Universal Music Australia	—
Hendle	Released: 1 May 2026; Format: Digital; Label: Island Records Australia, Universal Music Australia	24

=== EPs ===
List of albums, with selected details
Title	Details
Mr Trials: For the Ladies	Released: 2005; Format: Vinyl; Label: Obese Records

== Awards and nominations ==
He has won four ARIA Awards and has been accredited with two double-platinum albums and ten gold albums for his work as a rapper, composer, songwriter, and producer.

=== APRA Music Awards ===
The APRA Awards are presented annually from 1982 by the Australasian Performing Right Association (APRA), "honouring composers and songwriters".

Year	Nominee / work	Award	Result	Ref.
2018	Adam Briggs / Daniel Rankine	Songwriter of the Year	Won	
2019	"Blaccout" (Adam Briggs / Daniel Rankine)	Song of the Year	Shortlisted	

=== ARIA Music Awards ===
The ARIA Music Awards is an annual awards ceremony that recognises excellence, innovation, and achievement across all genres of Australian music. They commenced in 1987.

Year	Nominee / work	Award	Result	Ref.
2019	Cargo	Best Original Soundtrack, Cast or Show Album	Nominated	

=== National Indigenous Music Awards ===
The National Indigenous Music Awards is an annual awards ceremony that recognises the achievements of Indigenous Australians in music. The award ceremony commenced in 2004. Electric Fields have won one award from four nominations.

Year	Nominee / work	Award	Result	Ref.
2026	Hendle	Album of the Year	Nominated	
