= Who's Your Step Daddy =

Studio album by Funkoars
- Released: 19 September 2003
- Genre: Australian hip hop
- Length: 38:03
- Label: Peepshow Entertainment; Obese Records
- Producer: Trials, Sesta, FG, DJ Reflux

Funkoars chronology
| Who's Your Step Daddy (2003) | The Greatest Hits (2006) |

Who's Your Step Daddy is the debut album released by Australian hip hop group Funkoars in 2003. The album was released by Peepshow Entertainment and distributed by Obese Records. The album contains numerous pornographic references and their outrageous and passionate lyrics are potentially aimed at confronting or offending listeners. Following its release promoters started approaching Funkoars to book them for live performances, resulting in the group extensively touring Australia for three years before releasing a second album in 2006.

Brand, from In the Mix, introduced their album, "just honest to goodness Hip-Hop made by those who love it. The Funkoars definitely love it, their latest release Who’s Your Stepdaddy is crammed to the rim with thick, ass wiggling jams laced with intricate and comedic rhymes".

In 2011 the album was re-released digitally through iTunes, the album was also released in instrumental format for the first time.

== Track listing ==
| No. | Title | Writer(s) | Length |
|---|---|---|---|
| 1. | "Peepshow" | Daniel Rankine, Adam Baker, Matt Honson | 2:10 |
| 2. | "Boxbeaters" | Daniel Rankine, Adam Baker | 3:30 |
| 3. | "Drunkoars" | Daniel Rankine, Adam Baker | 4:24 |
| 4. | "Kidney Shifters" | Daniel Rankine, Adam Baker, Matt Honson | 3:13 |
| 5. | "Bad Habits (featuring Headlock & Hilltop Hoods)" | Daniel Rankine, Adam Baker, D. Yates, Tingeu, Daniel Smith, Matthew Lambert | 4:40 |
| 6. | "S.0.21 (Interlude)" | Daniel Rankine, Adam Baker, Matt Honson | 0:30 |
| 7. | "Behind The Stump" | Daniel Rankine, Adam Baker | 3:30 |
| 8. | "Avoid The Hangovers Stay Drunk Remix" | Matt Honson, Daniel Rankine, Cuts | 2:22 |
| 9. | "Still Drunk" | Daniel Rankine, Adam Baker, D. Yates, Matt Honson | 3:44 |
| 10. | "Kidney Shifters Remix" | Daniel Rankine, Adam Baker, Matt Honson | 3:02 |
| 11. | "Whoremoans" | Daniel Rankine, Adam Baker, D. Yates, Matt Honson | 4:12 |
| 12. | "Leg It" | Daniel Rankine, Adam Baker | 2:51 |
| Total length: | | | 38:03 |

== Release history ==
| Region | Date | Format | Label | Catalogue |
|---|---|---|---|---|
| Australia | 3 September 2003 | CD; LP; digital download | Peepshow Entertainment | PSE001 |
