= Golden Era Mixtape 2011 =

Mixtape by Golden Era Records
- Released: 17 January 2011
- Recorded: 2009–2011
- Genre: Australian hip hop, Hip hop
- Length: 48:50 (approx.)
- Label: Golden Era Records
- Producer: Various, DJ Madcap & Trials

Golden Era Records chronology
Golden Era Mixtape 2011 (2011)	'Golder Era Mixtape 2012' (2012)

Singles from Mixtape 2011
- 1. "The Funkiest" Released: 2011

Golden Era Mixtape 2011 is a mixtape by all artists signed to Australian Hip hop label Golden Era Records. It was released as a free download on 17 January 2011 on the Golden Era Records website. In an interview about the mixtape on Triple J, Suffa of the Hilltop Hoods said that "everyone's been downloading it so much that the website has crashed". There is not going to be a commercial release of the album, although physical copies were distributed free with purchases of Golden Era releases and at gigs featuring Golden Era artists.

== Track listing ==
1. Golden Era – Intro
2. Sesta & Suffa – 99 Bottles (Cuts By DJ Reflux)
3. Pressure – The Fire
4. Briggs – Let It Burn (Cuts By DJ Jaytee)
5. Funkoars – Lock Me Up
6. Vents – Love Song
7. DJ Reflux, DJ Debris & DJ Adfu – Portion of the Raw
8. Funkoars feat. Ash Grunwald – Little Did I Know
9. Vents & Trials feat. Mortar – The Discrete Charm of the Bourgeiosie (Cuts By DJ Adfu)
10. Briggs feat. Suffa – The Wrong Brother (Remix)
11. Briggs – The Peoples Champ
12. Vents – Existential Absurdity
13. Trials, Suffa, Briggs & Sesta – Lunchroom Table
14. Hilltop Hoods feat. Trials – Debris Told Me
15. Golden Era – Interlude
16. Hilltop Hoods – Chase That Feeling
17. Golden Era – The Funkiest
18. Funkoars – All I Need / Vamoose – Where I Am (Medley)
19. Vents – Rollin' Balls
20. Trials – Baby C'mon
