= Vents (musician) =

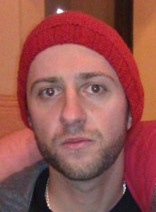
- Vents in 2011

Background information
- Born: 1983 (age 42–43)
- Origin: Portland, Victoria, Australia
- Genres: Australian hip hop
- Years active: 2003–present
- Labels: Obese Records (2007); Golden Era Records (2011–present)
- Website: Golden Era Records

Joseph Lardner, better known by the stage name Vents and also known as Vents One, Vents 1 and Vents Uno, is an Australian hip hop artist from Adelaide, South Australia. He has released two albums, 2007's Hard to Kill and 2011's Marked for Death. The latter was nominated for an ARIA Music Award.

== Early life ==
Joseph Lardner was born in Adelaide in 1983 and left university placements on two occasions without completion. Vents was involved with Adelaide's graffiti sub-culture before commencing as a MC around 1997.

== Music ==
Vents made his debut on Funkoars' release, Who's Your Step Daddy, in 2003, appearing on the track "Whoremoans". Prior to the release of his debut album in 2007, he also appeared on albums by Hilltop Hoods, Mr. Trials (Funkoars), Pegz and Hospice Crew.

=== Hard To Kill (2006–2011) ===
In 2006, Vents began working with Funkoars producer Trials on a solo album release and Pegz, also the CEO of the Melbourne-based Obese Records hip hop label, announced a release deal for the album in early 2007. Hard to Kill, released 28 July 2007, was produced almost exclusively by Trials and features guest appearances by Suffa (Hilltop Hoods), Sesta and Trials (Funkoars), and Mortar (Clandestein).

On 15 December 2008, Vents released the Trials-produced song "Class War" on the slackbastard political blog with the following message:

I was going to save this for the next album but I figured I will dedicate this to the folks in Greece before they run out of steam. RIP Alexis and all the best to you kids in Greece looking for a better quality of life. Trials on the boards and turnies of course.

Vents' message was in relation to the 2008 Greek riots.

=== Marked For Death (2011–) ===
Vents signed to Hilltop Hoods' then-fledgling label Golden Era Records, before releasing his second album Marked for Death, which was created over a four-year period. Trials was less involved with the second album, as a considerable workload meant that he was unable to replicate his degree of commitment. DJ and producer Adfu, also a Golden Era artist, joined Vents in a musical partnership and both recorded the majority of the album at a studio in Byron Bay, Australia. Adfu explained the development of the album in a post-release interview in 2011:

I've been watching him [Vents] simmer for four years and this is his thoughts on everything he saw happening in society. It's all the stuff that happened through the Howard era, with the class wars and the refugees and the war in Afghanistan. He was in a bit of a state of depression I think so this album is just about getting it all off his chest. Our biggest goal with this album was to make people realise that rap is not just about guns and drugs and stuff, there can be an intellectual side to it which can make you think about things. We were using tonnes of amphetamines during the making of this record. And during the subsequent touring phase. It really took it out of both of us but it contributed to the overall vibe of the record as well as the energy of the live shows.

Footage from the Marked For Death recording sessions that occurred at Take Away Studios, located in Adelaide, was published on YouTube. Take Away Studios is owned by DJ Debris (Barry Francis) of Hilltop Hoods.

Marked for Death was released on 13 May 2011 and the first single, "History of the World" was released on 8 April 2011—the corresponding music video was published on the Golden Era YouTube channel on 11 April. A music video for the second single "Rollin' Balls" was published on YouTube on 2 June 2011. Both music videos were directed by Adelaide-based artist Selina Miles.

The single "Marked For Death" was identified by Vents as his favorite song from both of his albums. Vents explained that the lyrics were written during a period when he was pondering his future and the prospect of being forced to engage in employment that "I [Vents] hate doing to make a quid". Vents describes the song as "angry", "hit you in the face-type stuff" and the political information presented in the music video was provided by the slackbastard blog. According to Vents, the intention of the music video was to "bombard the viewer into submission" with the information, whereby he plays "second fiddle".

Marked for Death debuted at number 25 on the Australian ARIA Albums Chart and was later nominated for an ARIA Music Award in the "Best Urban Album" category. Adfu said to Victoria, Australia's Beat magazine in the second half of 2011: "we've got nothing but positive comments. Myself and Joe [Lardner] have been really surprised at how people are taking it because it's great to see them taking in Joe's rhymes but seeing them through their own perspective. That's exactly what we were trying to achieve with this record." Vents then revealed in an August 2011 label interview with Pressure from Hilltop Hoods that he had only received one negative comment about the album.

Following the release of Marked For Death, Vents explained in September 2011 that his biggest influences at the time were Hilltop Hoods and Trials, and also described the context of his lyrical content: "I tend to have a fairly cynical, critical attitude about the world probably due to my upbringing, but I hope this changes in time and when that happens, my fans don't hold it against me."

Vents performed at Rolling Stone Australia magazine's inaugural "Live Lounge" event, held in Melbourne, Australia, on 29 September 2014. Apart from the Hilltop Hoods, who were touring in North America at the time, the entire Golden Era roster performed at the event.

== Touring ==
Vents has toured throughout Australia during his musical career, including festivals such as the Big Day Out, Sprung Festival and Homebake, and support-act performances for artists such as Wu-Tang Clan and Hilltop Hoods.

In September 2011, Vents explained the touring experience for the Marked For Death album:

Adfu and myself would do three nights in a row, often in different states. We'd jump on a plane first thing in the morning, land and then jump in a car and drive six hours to the gig, lugging road cases full of equipment and merchandise and set it all up before show time. After the gig, it's just a blur – your adrenaline is pumping so hard it's over before you notice and you don't really remember much. We usually get off stage and collapse and/or vomit. Then we pack up, sleep, wake up, load the car and get out of the hotel before they charge us for the room, and rush to make it in time for sound check at the next gig. During the off-days, you're pretty much useless to anyone. It's an insane lifestyle and it sounds like I'm complaining but it's what I always wanted to do, and once it's all over I always can't wait to get back out there again.

== Personal life ==
In 2011, Vents revealed that he drives a Ford Lazer car, while Adfu said that Vents lives in Adelaide, in close proximity to himself, Trials and Hilltop Hoods. During a holiday after the release of Marked For Death, Vents informed a reporter that he was "smoking weed, eating lots and playing Xbox".

Following the release of Hard To Kill, Vents was involved in a serious car accident in Adelaide with DJ Debris, Adfu and Adfu's brother. The four were in a car driven by DJ Debris and were struck by an alcohol-intoxicated driver.

== Discography ==
=== Albums ===
- Hard to Kill - Obese Records (OBR052) (28 July 2007)
- Marked for Death - Golden Era Records (GER008) (13 May 2011) AUS #25

=== Singles ===
- "History of the World" - Golden Era (8 April 2011)
- "Rollin' Balls" - Golden Era (2 June 2011)

=== Contributions ===
- Who's Your Step Daddy – Funkoars (song: "Whoremoans" ) (2003)
- For The Ladies 12" - Mr. Trials (Funkoars) (song: "Take A Bath") (2005)
- The Hard Road – Hilltop Hoods (song: "The Blue Blooded") (2006)
- The Greatest Hits – Funkoars (song: "The Symphony") (2006)
- Visiting Hours – Hospice Crew (song: "The Caution") (2006)
- Burn City – Pegz (song: "Diligent Music") (2007)
- The Hangover – Funkoars (song: "Double Dutch") (2008)
- State of the Art - Hilltop Hoods (song: "Rent Week") (2009)
- Ravenous 20Ten - Raven (song: "The Righteous and The Wretched") (2011)
- Golden Era Mixtape 2011 – Various (song: "A Love Song", "The Discrete Charm of the Bourgeiosie", "Existential Absurdity" and "Rollin' Balls")
- The Quickening – Funkoars (song: "The Assassination") (2011)
- Waiting To Die - Peeps (song: "The Razz") (2013)
- Instruments Of Torture – Gravity Ponds (song: "Sweatin The Radio") (2014)
