= Funkoars =

Australian musical group

- Origin: Adelaide, Australia
- Genre: Hip-hop
- Years active: 1999–2016 (hiatus)
- Labels: Obese, Peepshow Entertainment, Golden Era
- Members: Trials; Sesta; Hons
- Past members: Reflux
- Website: goldenerarecords.com.au/ge/funkoars/

Funkoars is an Australian hip-hop act formed in 1999 in Adelaide, South Australia, which has been "on hiatus" since 2016. The lineup consisted of Daniel Rankine a.k.a. Trials (MC, producer); Adam Baker a.k.a. Sesta (MC); Matthew Honson a.k.a. Hons (MC); and Daniel Yates a.k.a. DJ Reflux (DJ).

The group was a member of the South Australian hip-hop collective Certified Wise, which features other prominent Adelaide-based artists such as Hilltop Hoods and Vents. These acts have frequently collaborated on various Funkoars recordings as well. The group have performed throughout Australia, supporting or playing alongside acts such as Hilltop Hoods, Milkbar Stars, Koolism, Def Wish Cast, Cross Bred Mongrels, Gang Starr, Apathy & Celph Titled, and Public Enemy.

Despite being on hiatus since 2016, Funkoars remain signed to the Golden Era Records label.

== Biography ==
=== 1999–2005: Formation & Who's Your Step Daddy ===
Originating from Adelaide, South Australia, Funkoars was formed in Adelaide in 1999, and consisted of MC and producer Daniel Rankine (a.k.a. Mr Trials or Trials), MCs Adam Baker (a.k.a. Uncle Sesta or simply Sesta) and Matthew Honson (a.k.a. Sketchy Hons or Hons), and DJ Daniel Yates (a.k.a. Reflux). According to Trials, a "Funkoar is the dreg of society. It is the funnel in which all morals and conscious are drained into the river Styx."

Funkoars' debut album, Who's Your Step Daddy, was released by Peepshow Entertainment in September 2003. Following its release Funkoars toured Australia extensively.

=== 2006–2012: The Greatest Hits, The Hangover & The Quickening ===
Funkoars released its second studio album, The Greatest Hits, in September 2006 on Obese Records, an Australian hip-hop label. The production on the second album is mostly credited to Sesta and Trials, both of whom have also produced for the Hilltop Hoods. The Greatest Hits featured guest appearances, such as the Hilltop Hoods ("What I Want"), Vents ("The Symphony") and Pegz ("Meet The Family").

Following the release of The Greatest Hits, Funkoars embarked on a national tour, between July 2006 and August 2006, supported by Awbs & Maundz and Cross Bred Mongrels. In 2007, Funkoars performed at the Adelaide Big Day Out, as well as the 2009 Big Day Out in Sydney, Australia.

In 2008, Funkoars left Obese Records and returned to the Peepshow label for the release of the third album, The Hangover. The album's first single "Black Sally", features samples from single, of the same name, by Human Instinct, a psych-rock band from New Zealand—Human Instinct's vocalist/drummer, Maurice Greer, appeared in the music video for the single.

In September 2011, the band released The Quickening, which peaked at number 11 on the ARIA Charts. At the AIR Awards of 2012, it was nominated for Best Independent Hip Hop/Urban album.

=== 2013–present: Dawn of the Head ===
In February 2013, the group signed with Golden Era Records, a music label founded by Hilltop Hoods.

"Larry Emdur" was a single released in early 2013 and included on the 2013 Golden Era mixtape, and was a parody of the Australian television personality Larry Emdur, using a sample from the Larry David cable television program, Curb Your Enthusiasm (HBO). The music video for the single featured clips of Emdur from TV shows including The Price is Right. On occasion, Emdur joined the band during live performances of the song.

On 9 June 2013, the band announced that DJ Reflux was leaving the group to move onto other projects. Golden Era Records producer and DJ Adfu has performed with the Funkoars emcees in subsequent live shows.

To commence 2014, the band completed an east coast Australian tour over January and February to promote the Dawn of the Head EP. Supported by Australian duo Mr Hill & Rahjconkas, the three emcees received live DJ support from Adfu and the Adelaide launch show ended in a 20-emcee performance. The Funkoars were part of the Big Pineapple Music Festival that occurred in May 2014 on the Sunshine Coast in Queensland, Australia. In regard to touring in 2014, Sesta explained: "We (kinda) drink a lot less on the road these days, which means people don't avoid us nearly as much, so yes, anything's possible. What we can guarantee is you'll see four humans go from ice cube casual to monster mash in 30 seconds or less for the duration of our set, fun for the whole family."

In March 2014, Sesta explained that during band's formation and early days, notions of fame or success were not a significant factor in the creative process. He further elaborated:

"that's what gave the local scene such a strong foundation. There was no promised light at the end of the tunnel that your average band would dare to dream of." Sesta further explained that artists at the time were driven by a love of hip-hop culture, unconcerned by market trends, and they "enjoyed the process of making the songs" most of all. In addition to Gravediggaz and Akinyele, Sesta also identified Centrelink as an early influence of the band, as bandmate "Hons would come to my house on check day [welfare payment day] and we'd come up with a lot of ideas there, sort of."

The Funkoars released the Dawn of the Head EP in February 2014. In an interview in March 2014, Sesta described the effect that the changes within the band as "we used less samples and focused more on playing instruments ourselves, it led to a much more enjoyable and dynamic chemistry in the studio". Sesta described the song as "six heavy, sweat-dripping pockets of nervous energy, tightly duct-taped together, and pressed really hard onto wax"

In May 2016, the band released the single, "Mad As Hell".

=== Side projects ===
In June 2005, Trials released his debut solo EP, For the Ladies, distributed via Obese Records. Trials has also undertaken production for other Australian hip-hop recordings, such as Vents' Hard to Kill, a remix of the Hilltop Hoods single, "Clown Prince", and Drapht's albums, Brothers Grimm and Life of Riley. In relation to Life of Riley, reviewer, Shane Scott, proclaimed, "If you don't recognise Trials as one of Australia's finest producers by now you are a sleeping motherfucker, but in the end it's you who loses."

== Awards and nominations ==
=== AIR Awards ===
The Australian Independent Record Awards (commonly known informally as AIR Awards) is an annual awards night to recognise, promote and celebrate the success of Australia's Independent Music sector.

Year	Nominee / work	Award	Result
2012	The Quickening	Best Independent Hip Hop/Urban Album	Nominated

== Discography ==
=== Studio albums ===
Title	Details	Peak chart positions
Title	Details	AUS
Who's Your Step Daddy	Released: 19 September 2003; Label: Peepshow Entertainment (PSE001); Format: CD, LP, digital download	—
The Greatest Hits	Released: 17 July 2006; Label: Obese Records (OBR 046); Format: CD, 2xLP, digital download	—
The Hangover	Released: November 2008; Label: Peepshow Entertainment (PS003); Format: CD, 2xLP, digital download	57
The Quickening	Released: 16 September 2011; Label: Golden Era Records (GER009); Format: CD, LP, digital download	11

=== Extended plays ===
Title	Details	Peak chart positions
Title	Details	AUS
Dawn of the Head	Released: February 2014; Label: Golden Era Records (GEREP001); Format: CD, 12" LP, digital download	18

=== Singles ===
List of singles, with selected chart positions and certifications
Title	Year	Peak chart positions	Album
Title	Year	AUS	Album
"The Greatest Hit"	2006	—	The Greatest Hits
"Black Sally"	2008	56	The Hangover
"What's Your Malfunction"	2009	—	The Hangover
"Where I Am"	2011	—	The Quickening
"It's All Good (Is Very Good)"	2011	—	The Quickening
"Vamoose"	2012	—	The Quickening
"Larry Emdur"	2013	—	Golden Era mixtape (2013)
"A Clockwork Purple"	2014	—	Golden Era mixtape (2014)
"1Up" (featuring Phew & K21)	2014	—	Dawn of the Head
"The D"	2014	—	Dawn of the Head
"Mad As Hell"	2016	—	TBA

=== DVDs ===
Title	Details
The Greatest Hits Live	Released: 2007; Label: Obese Records (OBRDVD003); Format: DVD
