= Golden Era Records =

Australian record label

- Founded: 2008
- Founder: Hilltop Hoods
- Genre: Australian hip hop
- Country of origin: Australia
- Location: Adelaide
- Official website: http://www.goldenerarecords.com.au/

Golden Era Records is a record label that specialises in Australian hip hop music, based in Stirling, South Australia, Australia. The label was founded in 2008 by South Australian hip hop trio Hilltop Hoods.

== History ==
=== 2009–2011: State Of The Art, The Blacklist, The Quickening, Marked For Death ===
On 12 June 2009, in the year following the label's inception, the label's founder, the Hilltop Hoods, released its fifth album, State of the Art, through Golden Era.

In November 2009, Golden Era Records signed a deal with the Funkoars, a hip hop group from South Australia—as part of the deal, the Funkoars re-released its album, The Hangover, as The Hangover: Premium Edition. Also in 2009, Aboriginal Australian MC, Briggs, released his debut EP, Homemade Bombs, with a financial loan that he received from Suffa of the Hilltop Hoods (Suffa explained in a 2012 television interview that Briggs repaid the loan in full)—the label then signed Briggs and released his debut album, The Blacklist, in 2010. Pressure, also of the Hilltop Hoods, explained, in a 2012 television interview, the rationale behind Briggs' signing:

And one of the reasons we signed Briggs to the Golden Era label was... because he's just got this presence. You know, he's everywhere. He's probably the hardest-working individual in Australian hip-hop, if not one of. He's the most self-motivated dude I've ever met ... everywhere he goes, you know, everyone remembers Briggs.

On 28 July 2010, Hilltop Hoods completed work on a "zombie flick", Parade of the Dead, which was co-written by Hoods member Matt Lambert and made by Spirit Films and Oasis Post, divisions of Adelaide-based Kojo. Using the title from a State of the Art track, it was released on 22 October with the eponymous single. Filmed mostly in Adelaide, the former Adelaide Gaol was used as a "key location".

Adelaide MC Vents signed to Golden Era Records before releasing his second album Marked for Death, which was created over a four-year period, in May 2011. Vents collaborated with Adfu, a Palestinian-born producer/DJ, who also signed with the label. The album's first single, "History of the World", was released on 8 April 2011 and the corresponding music video was published on the Golden Era YouTube channel on 11 April. A music video for the second single "Rollin' Balls" was published on YouTube on 2 June 2011. Marked for Death debuted at number 25 on the Australian ARIA Albums Chart and was later nominated for an ARIA Music Award in the "Best Urban Album" category.

=== 2011–2013: Drinking From The Sun, Kid Sinatra EP ===
In the second half of 2011, Adfu explained the significance of Golden Era from his perspective:

Golden Era is amazing because we all go way, way back ... We all live pretty much with a 20-minute drive radius of each other and we're good friends. It's so much different when you're working in that kind of environment because you get treated as an artist but you get treated as a friend first. They're a lot easier to deal with and they're a lot more understanding and there is no doubt in my mind that they will continue to push us a hundred percent.

In November 2011, Hilltop Hoods premiered the single, "I Love It", on the Triple J breakfast show. Featuring Sia, the song peaked at No. 6 on the ARIA chart and was the lead single from their sixth album, Drinking from the Sun, which was released on 9 March 2012. Drinking from the Sun became their third number-one album in Australia and also charted on the New Zealand top 40 album chart.

In January 2012, Fontana—an independent marketing, sales and distribution company that is based within the corporate structure of the Universal Music Group—signed an exclusive agreement with Golden Era Records for the American release of Drinking from the Sun and the label's back catalogue titles. Following their win at the 2012 ARIA Awards ceremony, the Hilltop Hoods mentioned the release and title of their seventh album, '‘Walking Under Stars’', in a Facebook post, suggesting that it would emerge in late 2013; however, an album was not released during this period.

On 25 January 2013, the label announced the signing of another artist on the Golden Era Facebook fan page—K21, an Adelaide, Australia artist discovered through the Hilltop Hoods' "Initiative" programme was welcomed to Golden Era with the statement, "Welcome to the squad K21!!". However, no further official public notification, such as a press release, was published. In late January/early February 2013, K21's artist profile was added to the label's website and he is described as "a powerful weapon for years to come".

The Golden Era roster performed in a music video collaboration, entitled "Cypher", that was published on the label's YouTube channel on 24 January 2013. Set to the music of "Bloody Poetry" by Grieves (produced by Budo), the video features the entire Golden Era artist roster—Funkoars, Vents, Hilltop Hoods, Adfu, K21 and Briggs—and was directed/filmed by Unity Sound and Visual. Together with the announcements that were published on the Internet, the video introduces K21 to Golden Era Records, with the artist delivering the concluding verse.

In April 2013, K21 released his first recording with Golden Era, the free EP Kid Sinatra. The EP was uploaded onto the Golden Era Soundcloud page and, as of 11 April 2013, is available as a free download (together with the cover art) on the Acclaim Magazine website. A music video for the opening song "Long Time" was published on the Golden Era YouTube channel and the video, filmed at Disk Edits and DJ Debris's Take Away Studios, was filmed by Eightlimb Films and edited by K21.

Also in April 2013, the Hilltop Hoods stated that the development of Walking Under Stars was “well underway”, with the trio calling the album Drinking from the Sun "part two"—the latter received a double platinum sales certification in the same month. Additionally, American clothing company Zoo York announced a partnership with the Hilltop Hoods in April 2013, in preparation for the brand's 20th anniversary celebrations in 2014.

By September 2013, a release date for Walking Under Stars was not announced and a minor indication of the album's status was included in an Australian media article on the sale of band member Daniel Smith (Pressure)'s Adelaide home in the Flagstaff Hill area. The September article simply stated that Smith was "currently writing" for the album and, as of April 2014, further news had not been published.

=== 2014–present: Dawn Of The Head EP, Sheplife, Walking Under Stars ===
The Funkoars released the Dawn Of The Head EP in February 2014 to build momentum for the release of their fifth studio album, In Case of Emergency. In an interview in March 2014, Sesta explained that the forthcoming album "is like an aggressive foot rub from your neighbour, you’re kinda familiar with how it’s going to go down, but the closeness of it makes everyone a bit uncomfortable." However, Sesta did not confirm a release date for the album, stating:

Things have never felt better in the Oars camp, not just at home in the studio, but the last few tours we have done it has been really cool getting to meet all the people who come to our shows, both veteran fans and a stack of people who only know us from our last album. There always seems to be a real positive vibe at our shows, which has got us super keen to finish more music and just get back out there touring.

After its Australian release on 8 August 2014, Walking Under Stars debuted in the number-one position of the ARIA album charts during the week beginning 11 August 2014, providing the Hilltop Hoods with their fourth chart-topping album since The Hard Road in April 2006. As of 16 August 2014, the Hilltop Hoods have garnered a total of six weeks at the top of the ARIA charts from four number-one albums, three of which are Golden Era Records releases.

The label was invited by Rolling Stone Australia magazine to curate the inaugural "Live Lounge" event, held in Melbourne, Australia, on 29 September 2014. Apart from the Hilltop Hoods, who were touring in North America at the time, the entire Golden Era roster performed at the event.

"Change My Way", the first single from K21's debut Golden Era album, Any Given D-Day, was published as a streamable audio file on the Rolling Stone Australia website on 3 October 2014. The accompanying text said that the album will be released on Golden Era Records "towards the end of the year [2014]". Suffa was responsible for the production of the single and it also features Joy Sparkes. During the "Cosby Sweater" Australian tour, Suffa explained in a television interview that K21 is the "whole package", due to his proficient capacity in all aspects of hip hop music production.

== Golden Era mixtapes ==
The label released its first ever "mixtape", entitled Golden Era Mixtape 2011, on 17 January 2011, as a free download—it contains musical contributions from Hilltop Hoods, Funkoars, Briggs and Vents. On 30 January 2012, the second mixtape, entitled Golden Era Mixtape 2012, was released. The second mixtape contains musical contributions from Golden Era artists—Hilltop Hoods, Funkoars, Vents and Briggs—but also included appearances from other artists, such as K21 (at the time, signed to the Greenhouse label), Tommy Illfiger, Thundamentals, Plutonic Lab and Drapht; international artists, such as Canadian MC, Classified, also contributed to the 2012 mixtape recording. The compilation, hosted by Briggs and mixed by Adfu, was launched on the Australian national FM radio station, Triple J, on the station's hip hop programme, which is presented by Hau Latukefu of the Australian hip hop band, Koolism.

The third Golden Era mixtape became publicly available for download (free-of-charge, as per the first two instalments) on 1 February 2013, following a preview of the track listing that was published on the Internet on 31 January 2013—two tracks were also forwarded to Latukefu, who played them on Triple J's hip hop programme. On the day of the mixtape's release, a newsletter was emailed to the label's subscribers with the following blurb: "The 2013 Golden Era Mixtape is now available for FREE download from GoldenEraRecords.com.au. The tape features new and unreleased music from Hilltop Hoods, Funkoars, Vents, Briggs & K21, with a special guest feature from Seth Sentry." (Sentry is another Australian hip hop artist from the Victorian city of Melbourne, and the mixtape also features Briggs' DJ/producer, Jaytee, "on the ones and twos"—hip hop jargon for turntables). The announcement was also made on the label's Facebook and Twitter profiles.

The fourth Golden Era mixtape was released for download (free-of-charge, as per the first three instalments) on 25 February 2014. Available from the Golden Era Records website, the Mixtape was announced on Facebook and Twitter by the label and a "2014 Golden Era Cypher" video, in which all of the label's artists perform the Mixtape's final track, was published on the Golden Era YouTube profile on 16 February 2014. The Mixtape features new music from all Golden Era artists: Hilltop Hoods, Vents, Briggs, Funkoars, Adfu, and K21. While DJ Debris is credited with the overall mix of the Mixtape, Trials and Adfu also appear as DJs.

=== Mixtape releases ===
- Golden Era Mixtape 2011 (2011)
- Golden Era Mixtape 2012 (2012)
- Golden Era Mixtape 2013 (2013)
- Golden Era Mixtape 2014 (2014)
- Golden Era Mixtape 2015 (2015)

== Artists ==
As of September 2015, the following artists are signed to Golden Era Records:

- Hilltop Hoods
- Funkoars
- Briggs
- Vents
- Adfu
- K21
- Purpose

== Awards ==
The Hilltop Hoods received a 2008 Australian Recording Industry Association (ARIA) Music Award nomination for the platinum DVD City of Light. State of the Art then received the ARIA Awards for 'Best Urban Release' and 'Best Engineer', and the Australasian Performing Right Association (APRA) award for 'Urban Work of the Year'.

The Hilltop Hoods received three nominations in the 2013 APRA Awards: 'Most Played Australian Work' for "I Love It", and two nominations in the 'Urban Work of the Year' category for "I Love It" and "Speaking In Tongues".

The Funkoars were nominated for the 'Best Independent Hip-Hop Album' award (for The Quickening) at the 2012 Jägermeister Independent Music Awards. In an interview with the Australian Independent Records Association (AIR), the band stated that it believed that fellow Australian hip hop artist, 360, would win the award.

== Releases ==
=== Albums ===
- Hilltop Hoods: State of the Art (2009)
  - Certification (Australia): double platinum (140,000)
- Hilltop Hoods: The Calling (Deluxe Edition) (2009)
- Hilltop Hoods: The Hard Road (Deluxe Edition) (2009)
- Hilltop Hoods: The Hard Road Restrung (Deluxe Edition) (2009)
- The Funkoars: The Hangover: Premium Edition (2010)
- Briggs: So Dangerous EP (2010)
- Briggs: The Blacklist (2010)
- Golden Era Mixtape 2011 (2011)
- Vents: Marked For Death (2011)
- Funkoars: The Quickening (2011)
- Golden Era Mixtape 2012 (2012)
- Hilltop Hoods: Drinking from the Sun (2012)
  - Certification (Australia): platinum (70,000 units)
- Golden Era Mixtape 2013 (2013)
- K21: Kid Sinatra EP (2013)
- Funkoars: Dawn of the Head EP (2014)
- Golden Era Mixtape 2014 (2014)
- Hilltop Hoods: Walking Under Stars (2014)
- Maundz: Nobody's Business (2015)

=== Singles ===
- Hilltop Hoods: "Still Standing" (2009)
- Briggs: "The Wrong Brother" (2010)
- Vents: History of the World" (2011)
- Vents: "Rollin Balls" (2011)
- Funkoars: "Where I Am" (2011)
- Funkoars: "It's All Good (Is Very Good)" (2011)
- Hilltop Hoods (featuring Sia): "I Love It" (2011)
  - Certification (Australia): double platinum (140,000)
- Hilltop Hoods: "Rattling the Keys to the Kingdom" (2012)
- Briggs: "The Hunt" (2014)
- Hilltop Hoods: "Won't Let You Down" (2014)
- Hilltop Hoods: "Cosby Sweater" (2014)
