= 2017 in Australian music =

The following is a list of notable events and releases that happened in 2017 in music in Australia.

== Events ==
=== May ===
- 13 May – Australia's representative in the Eurovision Song Contest 2017, Isaiah Firebrace, finishes in ninth place with 173 points for the song "Don't Come Easy".

=== July ===
- 21–23 July – Splendour in the Grass 2017 is held at North Byron Parklands in Yelgun, New South Wales, headlined by The xx, Queens of the Stone Age and LCD Soundsystem.

== Releases ==
=== Albums ===
==== February ====
Date	Album	Artist	Genre(s)
10	Everyone We Know	Thundamentals	Hip hop

==== April ====
Date	Album	Artist	Genre(s)
21	Speeding	Allday	Hip hop
28	Off the Grid	Bliss n Eso	Hip hop

==== August ====
Date	Album	Artist	Genre(s)
18	Go Farther in Lightness	Gang of Youths	Indie rock; Alternative rock
25	Belly of the Beast	Citizen Kay	Hip hop

==== November ====
Date	Album	Artist	Genre(s)
10	Changa	Pnau	Electronic; wonky pop
10	Engraved in the Game	Kerser	Hip hop

==== December ====
Date	Album	Artist	Genre(s)
1	ClassicILL	Downsyde	Hip hop

=== Singles ===
- 10 February – What Can I Do If the Fire Goes Out? by Gang of Youths
- 9 March – Big Night Out by Butterfingers
- 17 March – In Motion by Allday
- 23 March – Feel Good by Kwame
- 23 March – Friends by Kwame
- 27 March – No Time by B-Nasty
- 28 March – Moments by Bliss n Eso
- 14 April – Blue by Bliss n Eso
- 28 April – Believe by Bliss n Eso
- 4 May – Here by Briggs
- 5 May – Hyperreal by Flume
- 10 May – Cloud 9 by Baker Boy
- 18 May – Richman by Downsyde
- 26 May – Let Me Down Easy by Gang of Youths
- 16 June – Drunk Together by Jai Waetford
- 22 June – Late Nights by Carmouflage Rose
- 9 August – The Deepest Sighs, the Frankest Shadows by Gang of Youths
- 17 August – Champagne by Jai Waetford
- 1 September – A Dark Machine by ShockOne
- 22 September – Yesterday by 360
- 6 October – Marryuna by Baker Boy
- 20 October – Girl with a Suntan by Jai Waetford
- 27 October – Way Out by 360
- 27 October – Go Bang by Pnau
- 10 November – Back in the Game by Downsyde
- 14 December – We Don't Have To by Jai Waetford
- 29 November – The Heart Is a Muscle by Gang of Youths

== Deaths ==
- 2 January – Auriel Andrew, 69, singer
- 22 January – Geoffrey Gurrumul Yunupingu, 46, musician
- 13 February – Carol Lloyd, 68, singer, songwriter, composer
- 19 July – Graham Wood, 45, musician
- 2 August – Tony Cohen, 60, record producer, sound engineer
- 16 October – Iain Shedden, 60, drummer
- 22 October – George Young, 70, musician, songwriter, record producer
- 18 November – Malcolm Young, 64, musician, guitarist, songwriter, producer

== See also ==
- Australia in the Eurovision Song Contest 2017
- List of number-one singles of 2017 (Australia)
- List of number-one albums of 2017 (Australia)
