= Say Yes to Life Tour =

2018 concert tour by Gang of Youths

- Tour by Gang of Youths
- Tour poster promoting the initial seven shows
- Location: Australia
- Associated album: Go Farther in Lightness (2017)
- Start date: 28 October 2018
- End date: 31 January 2019 (Note: Originally scheduled to conclude on 30 November 2018, but delayed due to the first Sydney show being postponed until the next year.)
- No. of shows: 21
- Supporting acts: Charlie Collins
- Attendance: 50,000

Gang of Youths concert chronology
- National tour (2017); Say Yes to Life Tour (2018); Angel in Realtime Tour (2022)

The Say Yes to Life Tour was the seventh nationwide concert tour by Australian alternative rock band Gang of Youths, and the second supporting their 2017 studio album, Go Farther in Lightness. Spanning 21 sold-out shows across five major capital cities in Australia, with 14 between Sydney and Melbourne alone, the band broke venue records at both the Enmore Theatre and the Forum. The Say Yes to Life Tour received widespread critical acclaim, and was nominated for the ARIA Award for Best Live Act.

== Background and sales ==
In August 2017, Gang of Youths released their second studio album, Go Farther in Lightness. It debuted at number one on the ARIA charts, received widespread critical acclaim from music outlets, and was supported by a national tour with seven shows from August to September 2017. In January the following year, Australian youth radio station Triple J held the Hottest 100 of 2017, which saw Gang of Youths feature a record-equalling three songs in the top 10, (Note: The only other artists to have had three songs in the top 10 previously were Powderfinger in 2003 and Chet Faker in 2014.) with "Let Me Down Easy" placed highest at number two. The album also topped Triple J's annual album poll and received four ARIA Awards, including Album of the Year.

Following a European and North American tour, Gang of Youths announced in May 2018 they would be returning for a second nationwide tour. The Say Yes to Life Tour, named after the closing track on Go Farther in Lightness, originally featured only seven shows. The band were quick to add several additional dates after "selling out their initial run in record time", with five more shows added in Sydney and Melbourne each, and one more in each of the other three cities. Just a week later, they added a seventh night at the Forum Theatre, and a sixth at the Enmore, breaking records for most performances at both venues within a single tour. Days later, they announced a special all-ages show in Melbourne, making for an eighth night in the city. It came after Victorian youth music organisation The Push appealed for the band to perform a show for fans under 18 years old. In total, the band performed 21 shows in the tour.

== Reception ==
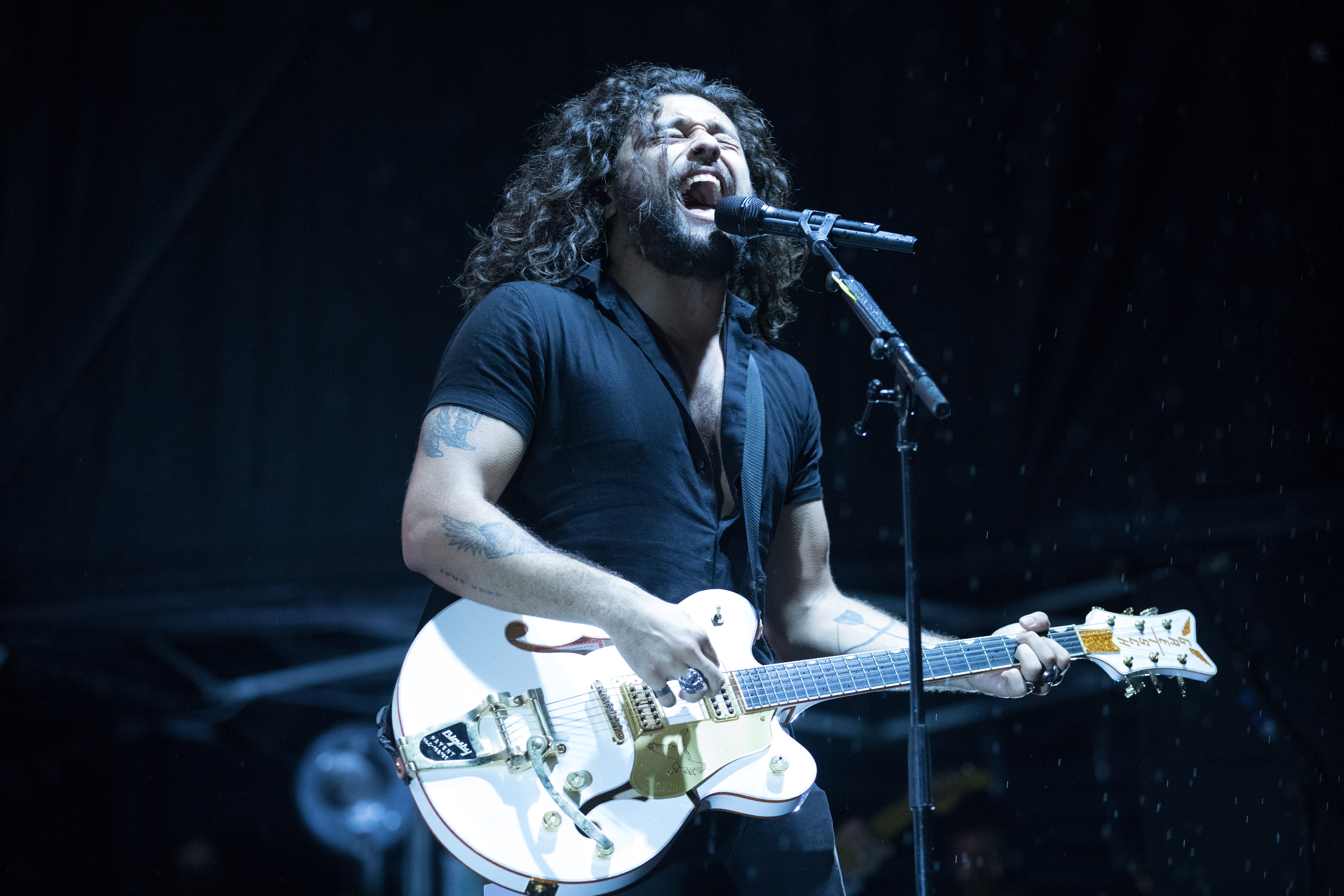
Critics were impressed by the stage presence of frontman David Le'aupepe, pictured in 2017.

Performances on the tour were lauded by critics. Reviewing from Sydney, Kate Hennessy of The Guardian said the band were "note-perfect all night". Giving the show five stars, she wrote of her amusement at the frontman's self-deprecating banter, writing: "Le’aupepe bereaves me of any potential critique as I find myself instead utterly swept up in the concert’s central mantra: saying yes to life". Reviewing a Melbourne show for Savage Thrills, Nate Hill wrote of the crowd's engagement with the band's music: "Gang of Youths has a way of turning a punter into a true believer", he wrote, concluding the audience "left the beautiful Forum Theatre feeling as though they had been part of something special".

Writing for the AU Review, Genevieve Morris compared Le'aupepe's stage presence to that of Bruce Springsteen and Michael Hutchence. She said the band consistently had "the whole crowd in a daze" and during the last song, "the whole room felt connected and was absolutely buzzing, which is true credit to the sensory experience Gang of Youths can manufacture". However, she did feel as though some tracks in the set weren't suitable in a live setting, including "Persevere" and "Vital Signs".

At the ARIA Awards of 2019, the tour was nominated for Best Australian Live Act.

== Set list ==
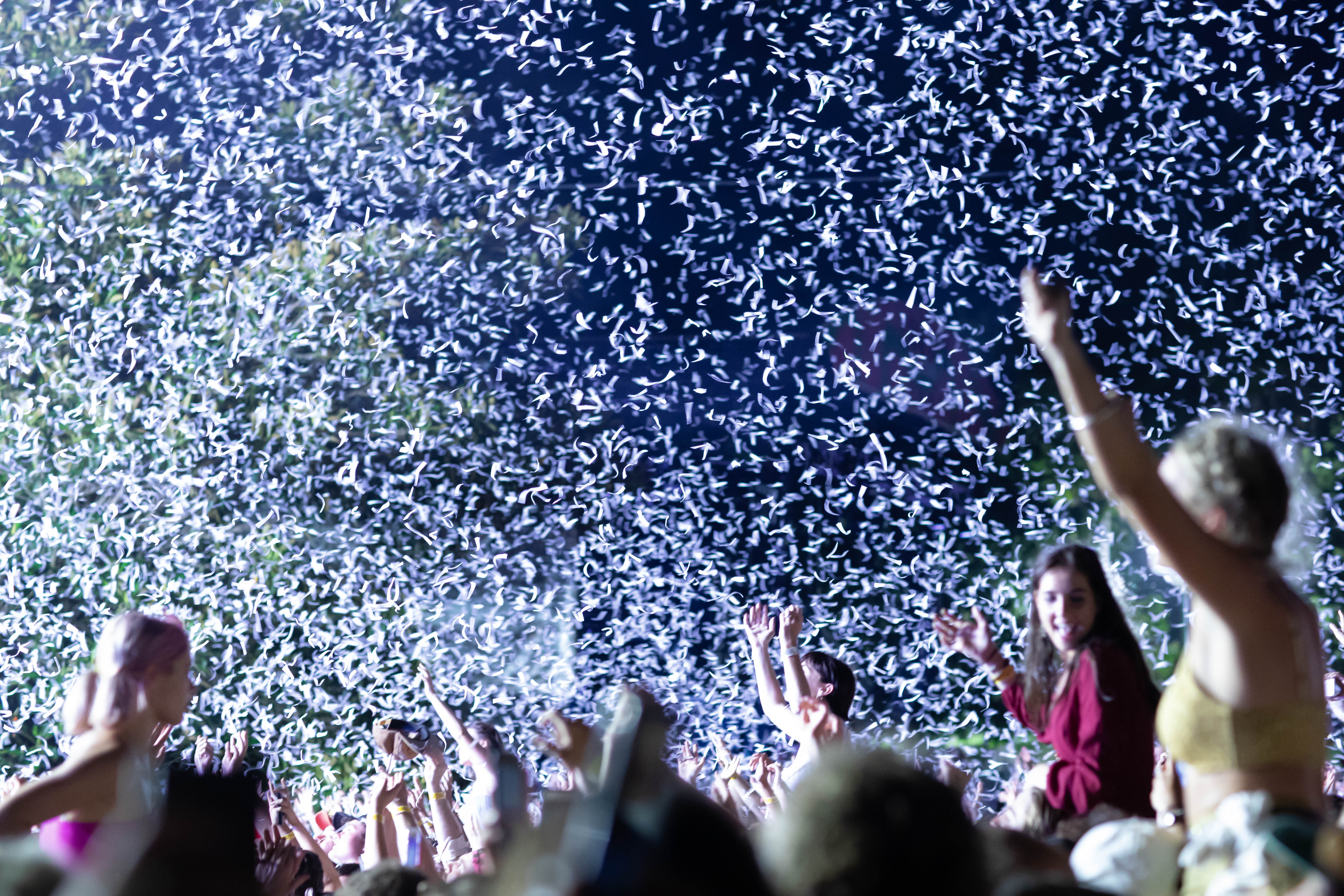
Confetti rained on the crowd during the band's performance of "Say Yes to Life", which concluded each show on the tour.

This set list is from the Sydney show on 29 November 2018, and is not completely representative of the entire tour.

1. "Fear and Trembling"
2. "What Can I Do If the Fire Goes Out?"
3. "Keep Me In the Open"
4. "L'imaginaire"
5. "Do Not Let Your Spirit Wane"
6. "Go Farther in Lightness"
7. "Persevere"
8. "The Heart Is a Muscle"
9. "Let Me Down Easy"
10. "Magnolia"
11. "The Deepest Sighs, the Frankest Shadows"

Encore

12. "Still Unbeaten Life"
13. "Vital Signs"
14. "Say Yes to Life"

== Shows ==
Over 50,000 tickets were sold, and all shows sold out.

Note: Show added due to demand

List of concerts in the Say Yes to Life tour (2018–2019)
Date	City	Venue
28 October	Melbourne	Forum Theatre
29 October	Melbourne	Forum Theatre
31 October	Melbourne	Forum Theatre
3 November	Fremantle	Fremantle Arts Centre
4 November	Fremantle	Fremantle Arts Centre
6 November	Melbourne	Forum Theatre
7 November	Melbourne	Forum Theatre
8 November	Melbourne	Forum Theatre
12 November	Melbourne	Forum Theatre
13 November	Melbourne	Forum Theatre
14 November	Hobart	Odeon Theatre
16 November	Hobart	Odeon Theatre
17 November	Adelaide	Thebarton Theatre
18 November	Adelaide	Thebarton Theatre
22 November	Sydney	Enmore Theatre
26 November	Sydney	Enmore Theatre
27 November	Sydney	Enmore Theatre
29 November	Sydney	Enmore Theatre
30 November	Sydney	Enmore Theatre
31 January (Note: Rescheduled date of the first Sydney show on 21 November 2018, which was postponed due to illness.)	Sydney	Enmore Theatre
