= MTV Unplugged (Live in Melbourne) =

Live album by Gang of Youths
- Released: 26 October 2018
- Recorded: 25 July 2018
- Venues: Cobblestone Pavilion, West Melbourne
- Length: 60:38
- Labels: Mosy Recordings; Sony Music Australia

Gang of Youths chronology
Go Farther in Lightness (2017)	MTV Unplugged (Live in Melbourne) (2018)	Total Serene (2021)

Singles from MTV Unplugged (Live in Melbourne)
- 1. "Still Unbeaten Life" Released: 14 September 2018; 2. "Fear and Trembling" Released: 28 September 2018

MTV Unplugged (Live in Melbourne) is the first live album by Australian alternative band Gang of Youths. Gang of Youths were the first band to record a MTV Unplugged live in Australia in the new millennium.

The album includes nine tracks from their album Go Farther in Lightness and one from their EP Let Me Be Clear. Gang of Youths bassist Max Dunn said the performance was a "pretty important moment" for the group, explaining "it's a cool chance to do something a little different and stretch ourselves and give the fans a little more experience of the songs."

The recording took place at Cobblestone Pavilion, West Melbourne on 25 July 2018 and was broadcast on MTV Australia on 19 August 2018. The album was released on 26 October 2018.

== Reception ==
Professional ratings
Review scores
Source	Rating
The AU Review	3.5/5 stars

Dylan Marshall from The AU Review wrote that "The recording has been delivered in two distinct parts: the opening five tracks are your real party tunes... the closing five tracks [are] the intimate, eat-away-at-your-heart type of tracks. It is this distinct differentiation in the release that makes the listening a little bit of a let down. By no means is their Unplugged performance disappointing; it just doesn't live up to the highs that I know the band are capable of in not only a studio setting, but also a full live show experience." Marshall added "As someone who has followed the band since their earliest days, I know what they can produce in a live setting. This Unplugged recording just may not be the best indicator of what the band truly have to showcase."

Stack Magazine said "Some bands make a concise effort to replicate their recorded songs live on stage, but there is an inescapably raw and sometimes tribal feeling that... is translated into this engrossing recording of the MTV event."

== Track listing ==
All tracks are written by David Le'aupepe.

1. "Let Me Down Easy" – 6:23
2. "Fear and Trembling" – 7:15
3. "Keep Me In the Open" – 5:27
4. "The Deepest Sighs, the Frankest Shadows" – 7:30
5. "The Heart Is a Muscle" – 6:23
6. "Persevere" – 7:20
7. "L'Imaginaire" – 1:33
8. "Do Not Let Your Spirit Wane" – 7:33
9. "Go Farther in Lightness" – 2:33
10. "Still Unbeaten Life" – 8:41

== Personnel ==
=== Musicians ===
Gang of Youths

- David Le'aupepe – writing, vocals, guitar
- Joji Malani – lead guitar
- Max Dunn – bass
- Jung Kim – guitar, keyboards
- Donnie Borzestowski – drums

The Letter String Quartet

- Lizzy Welsh – violin
- Steph O'Hara – violin
- Biddy Connor – violin
- Judith Hamann – cello

Other musicians

- Charlie Woods – trumpet
- Ellie Lamb – trombone

=== Technical ===
- Greg Wales – mixing
- Steve Smart – mastering

Promotional

- Kane Hibberd – photography
- Connor Bugelli – artwork, design

== Charts ==
Chart performance for MTV Unplugged (Live in Melbourne)
Chart (2018)	Peak position
Australian Albums (ARIA)	5

== Release history ==
Release history and formats for MTV Unplugged (Live in Melbourne)
Country	Date	Format	Label	Catalogue
Australia	26 October 2018	CD+DVD; vinyl; digital download; streaming	Mosy Recordings, Sony Music Australia	19075896432

== See also ==
- List of artists featured on MTV Unplugged
