= The Deepest Sighs, the Frankest Shadows =

Single by Gang of Youths

from the album Go Farther in Lightness
- Released: 9 August 2017
- Genre: Alternative rock
- Length: 5:51
- Label: Mosy, Sony
- Lyricist: David Le'aupepe
- Producers: Adrian Breakspear, Gang of Youths

Gang of Youths singles chronology
"Let Me Down Easy" (2017)	"The Deepest Sighs, the Frankest Shadows" (2017)	"The Heart Is a Muscle" (2017)

"The Deepest Sighs, the Frankest Shadows" is a song by Australian alternative rock band Gang of Youths. It was released on 9 August 2017 as the fourth single from their second studio album, Go Farther in Lightness.

The song peaked at number 93 on the ARIA Singles Chart, becoming the band's second top 100 single. In Triple J's Hottest 100 of 2017, it polled at number five; the song also appeared at number 52 in the 2010s countdown, and at number 87 in the Hottest 100 of Australian Songs. Critically acclaimed, the song was nominated for Rock Work of the Year at the APRA Music Awards of 2019 and named among the best Australian songs of the 21st century by Rolling Stone.

== Composition ==
Frontman David Le'aupepe said the song came about as he struggled with writer's block for about a year, "barely managing to etch out more than a single verse of something awful the whole time." As he was walking across the Brooklyn Bridge, contemplating quitting music, he had an epiphany.

"In a cosmos potentially absent of meaning, and an existence devoid of objective value, I have an opportunity to invent my own meaning. We all do."

The song's lyrics are about "being more human, more aware [and] more alive," according to Le'aupepe. It is a slow-burning composition with a powerful, cathartic climax.

Music critic Ben Yung wrote that the song's moving, cinematic orchestration recalls the work of Gin Blossoms, and creates a "soundscape that moves from the serene to heart-pounding." Writing for Rolling Stone, Jade Kennedy heard a clear Bruce Springsteen influence, and concluded the track is an example of how the band can turn "complex philosophy into accessible, life-affirming rock 'n' roll."

== Music video ==
The music video was filmed in Little River, Victoria and directed by Dan and Jared Daperis. It depicts Le'aupepe as a convict escaping in the early morning, as the sun rises through fields. It was nominated for Best Video at the 2017 ARIA Music Awards.

== Reception ==
The song has appeared in three Triple J Hottest 100 countdowns. In the 2017 poll, it was voted into number five; Gang of Youths had three songs in the top 10 that year, with "Let Me Down Easy" at number two, and "What Can I Do If the Fire Goes Out?" at number 10. Two years later, in Triple J's Hottest 100 of the 2010s, "The Deepest Sighs, the Frankest Shadows" reached number 52. The song was also voted number 87 in the Hottest 100 of Australian Songs, held in 2025.

In a 2025 list of the best Australian and New Zealand songs of the 21st century, editors of Rolling Stone Australia / New Zealand placed "The Deepest Sighs, the Frankest Shadows" at number 117.

"The Deepest Sighs, the Frankest Shadows" was nominated for Rock Work of the Year at the APRA Music Awards of 2019, but lost to "Never Ever" by the Rubens featuring Sarah Aarons.

== Covers ==
In 2021, Australian indie pop singer Gretta Ray covered "The Deepest Sighs, the Frankest Shadows" for Triple J's live music segment Like a Version. When she opened for Gang of Youths on their Angel in Realtime Australian Tour, Ray joined Le'aupepe on stage to perform a duet of the song.

== Charts ==
Chart (2018)	Peak position
Australia (ARIA)	93

== Certifications ==
Region	Certification	Certified units/sales
Australia (ARIA)	Platinum	70,000^{‡}
^{‡} Sales+streaming figures based on certification alone.

== Personnel ==
Musicians

- David Le'aupepe – lead vocals, lyrics
- Donnie Borzestowski – drums
- Joji Malani – lead guitar
- Jung Kim – guitar, keyboards
- Max Dunn – bass guitar

Production

- Gang of Youths – producer
- Adrian Breakspear – producer
- Peter Katis – mixing engineer
- Joe Lambert – mastering engineer
- Josh Pearson – assistant engineer
- David Le'aupepe – engineer
- Lewis Mitchell – engineer
- Peter Holz – engineer
