= ARIA Award for Best Australian Live Act =

Annual Australian music industry award

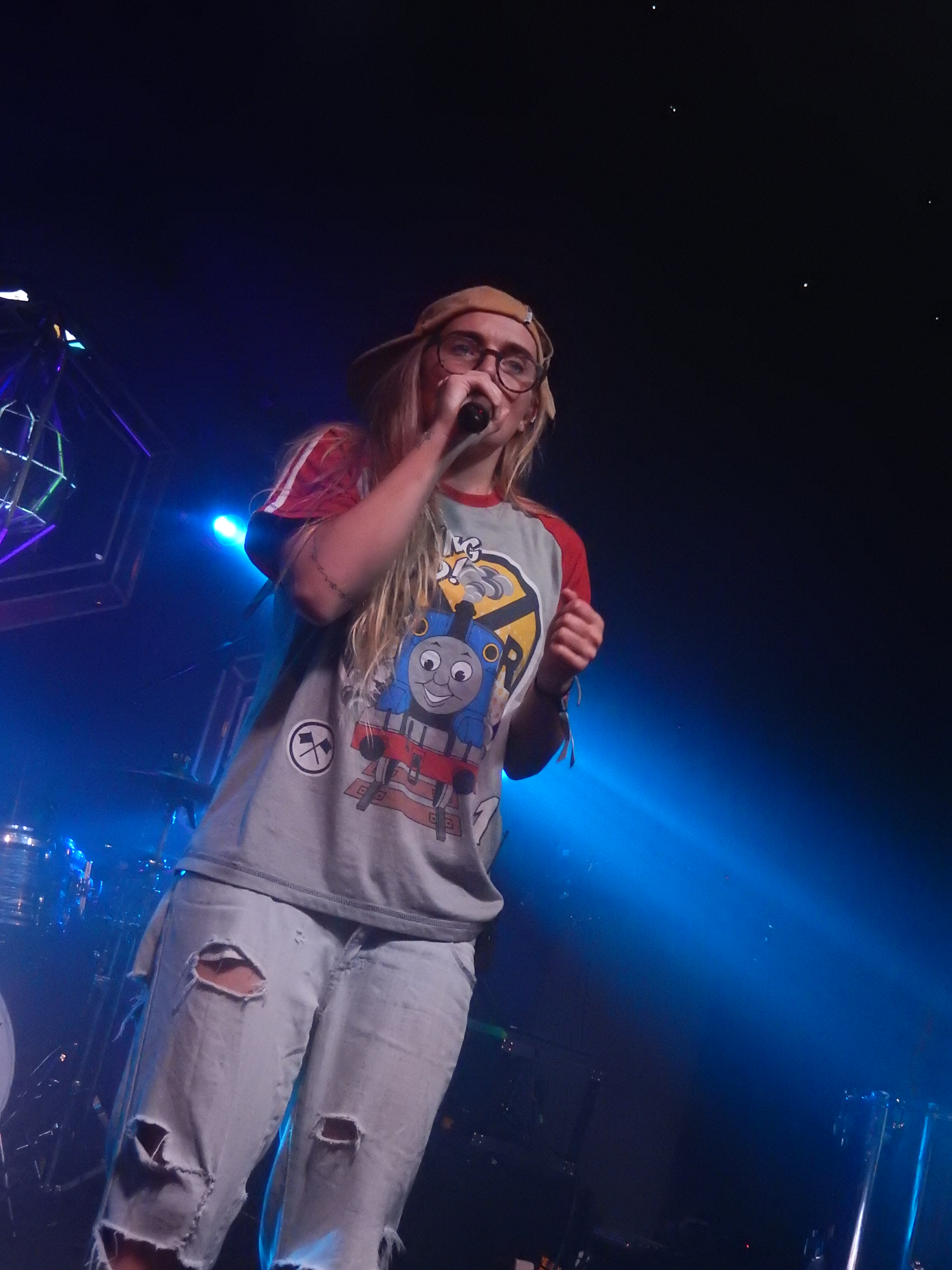
- 2026 winner G Flip
- Country: Australia
- Presented by: Australian Recording Industry Association (ARIA)
- First award: 2011
- Currently held by: G Flip, Dream Ride Tour Australia 2025 (2026)

Highlights
- Most wins: 5 Seconds of Summer, G Flip and Hilltop Hoods (2 each)
- Most nominations: Gang of Youths (7)
- Website: www.ariaawards.com.au

The ARIA Music Award for Best Australian Live Act, is a popular-voted award presented at the annual ARIA Music Awards, which recognises live performers. It replaces the previous category, ARIA Music Award for Most Popular Australian Live Artist, which had been first awarded in 2011. ARIA members may enter eligible acts as part of the normal entry process. The entries must meet the artist eligibility criteria and must have performed at ticketed events in at least three Australian States and/or Territories during the Eligibility Period. A Judging School will vote to determine the final 10 nominees, which will then form the nominee pool for public voting.

5 Seconds of Summer, G Flip and Hilltop Hoods are the only artists to win twice in this category, with the former two winning both their nominations. Gang of Youths have the most nominations with seven, but have never won.

== Winners and nominees ==
In the following table, the winner is highlighted in a separate colour, and in boldface; the nominees are those that are not highlighted or in boldface.

Winner marked in a separate colour

Year	Winner(s)	Tour
**2011** (25th)
**2011** (25th)	**The Living End**	—N/a
**2011** (25th)	Birds of Tokyo	—N/a
**2011** (25th)	Justice Crew	—N/a
**2011** (25th)	Keith Urban	—N/a
**2011** (25th)	Shannon Noll	—N/a
**2012** (26th)
**2012** (26th)	**Gotye**	**Making Mirrors Album Tour**
**2012** (26th)	360	The Flying Tour
**2012** (26th)	Cold Chisel	Light the Nitro Tour
**2012** (26th)	Dirty Three	Dirty Three March 2012 Tour
**2012** (26th)	Hilltop Hoods	Drinking From The Sun
**2012** (26th)	Hoodoo Gurus	Dig It Up! the Hoodoo Gurus Invitational
**2012** (26th)	Kate Miller-Heidke	Nightflight
**2012** (26th)	The Bamboos	Medicine Man Tour
**2012** (26th)	The Jezabels	Prisoner Album Launch
**2012** (26th)	The Living End	The Ending Is Just the Beginning Repeating Tour
**2013** (27th)
**2013** (27th)	**Guy Sebastian**	**Get Along Tour**
**2013** (27th)	Matt Corby	Australian Tour
**2013** (27th)	Karnivool	Asymmetry Tour
**2013** (27th)	Flume	The Infinity Prism Tour
**2013** (27th)	The Drones	I See Seaweed Tour
**2013** (27th)	Birds of Tokyo	March Fires Tour
**2013** (27th)	Tame Impala	Lonerism Tour
**2013** (27th)	Keith Urban	The Story So Far Tour
**2013** (27th)	Nick Cave and the Bad Seeds	National Tour
**2013** (27th)	Neil Finn & Paul Kelly	Australian Tour
**2014** (28th)
**2014** (28th)	**Keith Urban**	**Light the Fuse Tour**
**2014** (28th)	Boy & Bear	National Tour
**2014** (28th)	Dan Sultan	Blackbird Album Tour
**2014** (28th)	John Butler Trio	Flesh & Blood Tour
**2014** (28th)	Melbourne Ska Orchestra	The Diplomat Tour
**2014** (28th)	RÜFÜS	Worlds Within Worlds Tour
**2014** (28th)	Tame Impala	Big Day Out 2014
**2014** (28th)	The Preatures	Two Tone Melody Tour
**2014** (28th)	The Presets	The National Tour
**2014** (28th)	Violent Soho	National Tour
**2015** (29th)
**2015** (29th)	**5 Seconds of Summer**	**Rock Out with Your Socks Out Tour**
**2015** (29th)	Courtney Barnett	Sometimes I Sit and Think, and Sometimes I Just Sit Tour
**2015** (29th)	Gang of Youths	Gang of Youths National Tour
**2015** (29th)	Hermitude	Dark Night Sweet Light Tour
**2015** (29th)	Hilltop Hoods	Cosby Sweater Australian Tour
**2015** (29th)	Nick Cave	Nick Cave Australian Tour
**2015** (29th)	Paul Kelly	The Merri Soul Sessions
**2015** (29th)	Sheppard	The Bombs Away Tour
**2015** (29th)	The Preatures	The Cruel Tour
**2015** (29th)	Vance Joy	Dream Your Life Away Tour
**2016** (30th)
**2016** (30th)	**Hilltop Hoods**	**The Restrung Tour**
**2016** (30th)	Courtney Barnett	National Theatre Tour
**2016** (30th)	Flume	St. Jerome's Laneway Festival 2016
**2016** (30th)	Gang of Youths	Gang of Youths National Tour
**2016** (30th)	King Gizzard & the Lizard Wizard	Nonagon Infinity Tour
**2016** (30th)	RÜFÜS	Bloom Tour
**2016** (30th)	Tame Impala	Australian Tour
**2016** (30th)	The Living End	Shift Tour
**2016** (30th)	Violent Soho	The WACO Tour
**2016** (30th)	You Am I	Bargain Bin Bon Vivants Tour
**2017** (31st)
**2017** (31st)	**Illy**	**The Two Degrees Tour**
**2017** (31st)	Client Liaison	Diplomatic Immunity Tour
**2017** (31st)	Flume	Australian Tour 2016
**2017** (31st)	Gang of Youths	Gang of Youths
**2017** (31st)	Jessica Mauboy	All the Hits Live Tour
**2017** (31st)	Nick Cave and the Bad Seeds	Australia & New Zealand Tour 2017
**2017** (31st)	Tash Sultana	Tash Sultana Aus/NZ 2017
**2017** (31st)	King Gizzard & the Lizard Wizard	Gizzfest
**2017** (31st)	Peking Duk	Clowntown Tour
**2017** (31st)	Violent Soho	Violent Soho with special guests The Bronx
**2018** (32nd)
**2018** (32nd)	**5 Seconds of Summer**	**Meet You There Tour**
**2018** (32nd)	Amy Shark	Love Monster Tour
**2018** (32nd)	Client Liaison	Expo Liaison
**2018** (32nd)	Courtney Barnett	Tell Me How You Really Feel National Tour
**2018** (32nd)	Dean Lewis	2017 National Tour
**2018** (32nd)	Gang of Youths	Gang of Youths 2017 National Tour
**2018** (32nd)	Paul Kelly	Life Is Fine Tour 2017
**2018** (32nd)	Peking Duk	The Wasted Tour
**2018** (32nd)	Pnau	Pnau Changa Australian Tour
**2018** (32nd)	Tash Sultana	Homecoming Tour
**2019** (33rd)
**2019** (33rd)	**Hilltop Hoods**	**The Great Expanse World Tour**
**2019** (33rd)	Amy Shark	Amy Shark Australian Tour
**2019** (33rd)	Baker Boy	Cool as Hell Tour
**2019** (33rd)	Electric Fields	2000 and Whatever Tour
**2019** (33rd)	Gang of Youths	Say Yes to Life Tour
**2019** (33rd)	Keith Urban	Graffiti U Tour 2019
**2019** (33rd)	King Gizzard & the Lizard Wizard	King Gizzard & the Lizard Wizard Australian Tour 2019
**2019** (33rd)	Midnight Oil	Midnight Oil
**2019** (33rd)	Peking Duk	Peking Duk's Biggest Tour Ever... So Far
**2019** (33rd)	The Teskey Brothers	The Teskey Brothers – Intimate Venue Tour
**2020** (34th)
**2020** (34th)	**Amy Shark**	**Amy Shark Regional Tour**
**2020** (34th)	Baker Boy	Falls Festival
**2020** (34th)	Cold Chisel	Blood Moon Tour
**2020** (34th)	DMA's	Unplugged & Intimate, Laneway Festival
**2020** (34th)	King Gizzard & the Lizard Wizard	St Jerome's Laneway Festival
**2020** (34th)	Paul Kelly	Paul Kelly - Making Gravy 2019
**2020** (34th)	Pnau	All of Us Australian Tour
**2020** (34th)	RÜFÜS DU SOL	2019 Summer Festival Tour
**2020** (34th)	Sampa the Great	The Return Australian Tour 2019
**2020** (34th)	The Teskey Brothers	Run Home Slow
**2021** (35th)
**2021** (35th)	**Lime Cordiale**	**Relapse Tour**
**2021** (35th)	Amy Shark	Cry Forever Tour 2021
**2021** (35th)	Ball Park Music	Ball Park Music - The Residency
**2021** (35th)	Budjerah	Budjerah 2021 Aus Tour
**2021** (35th)	Genesis Owusu	Smiling With No Teeth Album Tour
**2021** (35th)	King Gizzard & the Lizard Wizard	Micro Tour
**2021** (35th)	Midnight Oil	Makarrata Live
**2021** (35th)	The Avalanches	The Avalanches Live
**2021** (35th)	The Teskey Brothers	The Teskey Brothers (Headline Shows + Festivals)
**2021** (35th)	Thelma Plum	Homecoming Queen Tour
**2022** (36th)
**2022** (36th)	**The Wiggles**	**The OG Wiggles Reunion / Fruit Salad TV Big Show Tour**
**2022** (36th)	Amy Shark	See U Somewhere Australia Tour 2022
**2022** (36th)	Amyl and the Sniffers	Comfort to Me Tour 2022
**2022** (36th)	Baker Boy	Gela Tour
**2022** (36th)	Budjerah	The Conversations Australian Tour
**2022** (36th)	Gang of Youths	Angel in Realtime
**2022** (36th)	Genesis Owusu	Genesis Owusu & the Black Dog Band
**2022** (36th)	Midnight Oil	Resist. The Final Tour. 2022
**2022** (36th)	The Kid Laroi	End of the World Tour
**2022** (36th)	Thelma Plum	The Meanjin Tour
**2023** (37th)
**2023** (37th)	**G Flip**	**Drummer Australian Tour**
**2023** (37th)	Baker Boy	Regional Vic Tour
**2023** (37th)	Brad Cox	Acres Tour
**2023** (37th)	Budjerah	Budjerah Australian Tour
**2023** (37th)	DMA's	DMA's Live at Falls Festival
**2023** (37th)	Dom Dolla	Dom Dolla Australian Summer Festival Tour
**2023** (37th)	Julia Jacklin	Pre Pleasure Tour
**2023** (37th)	King Stingray	That's Where I Wanna Be Tour
**2023** (37th)	Rüfüs Du Sol	Rüfüs Du Sol Australian 2022 Tour
**2023** (37th)	Tame Impala	Slow Rush Tour
**2024** (38th)
**2024** (38th)	**Missy Higgins**	**The Second Act Tour 2024**
**2024** (38th)	Angie McMahon	Making It Through Tour
**2024** (38th)	Barkaa	Barkaa
**2024** (38th)	Confidence Man	Laneway Festival
**2024** (38th)	Dirty Three	Love Changes Everything Tour
**2024** (38th)	Dom Dolla	Australian Tour 2023
**2024** (38th)	King Stingray	Regional Run 2024
**2024** (38th)	Royel Otis	Pratts & Pain Tour
**2024** (38th)	Rüfüs Du Sol	2024 Australian Summer Tour Dates
**2024** (38th)	Tones and I	P!nk supported by Tones and I
**2025** (39th)
**2025** (39th)	**Troye Sivan**	**Something to Give Each Other Tour**
**2025** (39th)	Amyl and the Sniffers	Cartoon Darkness World Tour
**2025** (39th)	Ball Park Music	Like Love Tour
**2025** (39th)	Barkaa	Big Tidda Tour
**2025** (39th)	Confidence Man	3AM (La La La) Tour
**2025** (39th)	Dom Dolla	Dom Dolla Australia 2024
**2025** (39th)	Hilltop Hoods	Hilltop Hoods 2025
**2025** (39th)	Kylie Minogue	Tension Tour 2025
**2025** (39th)	Miss Kaninna	Dawg in Me Tour
**2025** (39th)	Speed	Speed Australia Tour '25
**2026** (40th)
**2026** (40th)	**G Flip**	**Dream Ride Tour Australia 2025**
**2026** (40th)	Baker Boy	Djandjay Tour
**2026** (40th)	Boy Soda	Lil Obsession Tour
**2026** (40th)	Dom Dolla	Australian Tour 2025
**2026** (40th)	Gang of Youths	Various
**2026** (40th)	Genesis Owusu	Redstar Wu's Pirate Radio Tour
**2026** (40th)	Hilltop Hoods	Never Coming Home Tour
**2026** (40th)	King Gizzard & the Lizard Wizard	Phantom Island Australia Tour
**2026** (40th)	Ninajirachi	Dark Crystal V
**2026** (40th)	Paul Kelly	Australian Tour 2025

== Artists with multiple wins ==
2 wins

- 5 Seconds of Summer
- G Flip
- Hilltop Hoods

== Artists with multiple nominations ==
7 nominations

- Gang of Youths

6 nominations

- Hilltop Hoods
- King Gizzard & the Lizard Wizard

5 nominations

- Baker Boy
- Paul Kelly
- Rüfüs Du Sol
- Amy Shark

4 nominations

- Dom Dolla
- Warren Ellis (Note: Two each as a member of Dirty Three and Nick Cave and the Bad Seeds.)
- Tame Impala
- Keith Urban

3 nominations

- Courtney Barnett
- Budjerah
- Nick Cave (Note: Including two as a member of Nick Cave and the Bad Seeds.)
- Flume
- The Living End
- Midnight Oil
- Genesis Owusu
- Peking Duk
- The Teskey Brothers
- Violent Soho

2 nominations

- 5 Seconds of Summer
- Amyl and the Sniffers
- Ball Park Music
- Barkaa
- Birds of Tokyo
- Client Liaison
- Cold Chisel
- Confidence Man
- Dirty Three
- DMA's
- G Flip
- King Stingray
- Nick Cave and the Bad Seeds
- Thelma Plum
- Pnau
- The Preatures
- Tash Sultana
