= Let Me Be Clear =

EP by Gang of Youths
- Released: 29 July 2016
- Studios: Studios 301 (Sydney, Australia)
- Length: 34:10
- Labels: Mosy Recordings; Sony Music Australia
- Producers: Gang of Youths; Karl Cash; Chris Collins

Gang of Youths chronology
The Positions (2015)	Let Me Be Clear (2016)	Go Farther in Lightness (2017)

Singles from Let Me Be Clear
- 1. "Strange Diseases" Released: 16 May 2016

Let Me Be Clear is the first extended play by Australian alternative band Gang of Youths, released on 29 July 2016 via Mosy Recordings and Sony Music Australia. The EP features five original tracks and a cover of Joni Mitchell's "Both Sides Now".

Let Me Be Clear debuted and peaked at number two on the ARIA Albums Chart and was nominated for Best Rock Album at the 2016 ARIA Music Awards, but lost to Violent Soho's Waco.

== Release and promotion ==
Let Me Be Clear was released on CD, LP, and for digital download on 29 July 2016. The EP was preceded by one single: "Strange Diseases", released on 16 May 2016.

== Chart performance ==
Let Me Be Clear debuted and peaked at number 2 on the ARIA Albums Chart for the chart dated 8 August 2016, held off from the number one position by Human Nature's Gimme Some Lovin': Jukebox Vol II.

The following week, the album fell 21 positions to number 23, before halving its position in its third week of charting to land at number 46. The album fell to number 76 in its fourth week, before dropping out of the top 100 entirely a week later.

== Track listing ==
All tracks are written by David Le'aupepe except where noted.

No.	Title	Writer(s)	Length
1.	"The Good Fight"		6:32
2.	"Native Tongue"		4:14
3.	"Strange Diseases"	Le'aupepe; Joji Malani	3:19
4.	"A Sudden Light"		6:52
5.	"Still Unbeaten Life"		7:30
6.	"Both Sides Now"	Joni Mitchell	5:43
Total length:			34:10

== Personnel ==
Adapted from the album's liner notes.

=== Musicians ===
Gang of Youths

- David Le'aupepe – composing (1–5), vocals (1–6)
- Joji Malani – composing (3), performing (1–6)
- Jung Kim – performing (1–6)
- Max Dunn – performing (1–6)
- Donnie Borzestowski – performing (1–6)
- Tom Hobden – performing (1–6)

Other musicians

- Adrian Breakspear – clarinet (1)
- David J. Andrew – piano (1)
- Jennifer Geering – violin (1, 3, 5)
- Chris Collins – violin (1, 3, 5)
- Paul Taylor – cello (1, 3, 5)
- Patrick Stickles – piano (3)
- Jonathan Baker – trumpet (4–5)
- Joni Mitchell – composing (6)

=== Technical ===
- Gang of Youths – production (1–6)
- Karl Cash – production, recording (1–6), mixing (1, 4–6)
- Chris Collins – production (2), mixing (2–3)
- Adrian Breakspear – recording (1–6)
- Kevin McMahon – recording (3)
- Leon Zervos – mastering (1–6)

=== Artwork ===
- Mclean Stephenson – photography, artwork design

== Charts ==
Chart performance for Let Me Be Clear
Chart (2016)	Peak position
Australian Albums (ARIA)	2
