= Go Farther in Lightness =

Studio album by Gang of Youths
- Released: 18 August 2017
- Recorded: November–December 2016
- Studios: Sony Music, Sydney
- Genre: Indie rock
- Length: 77:14
- Labels: Mosy; Sony
- Producers: Adrian Breakspear; Gang of Youths

Gang of Youths chronology
| Let Me Be Clear (2016) | Go Farther in Lightness (2017) | MTV Unplugged (Live in Melbourne) (2018) |

Singles from Go Farther in Lightness
- 1. "What Can I Do If the Fire Goes Out?" Released: 9 February 2017; 2. "Atlas Drowned" Released: 12 May 2017; 3. "Let Me Down Easy" Released: 26 May 2017; 4. "Keep Me In the Open" Released: 26 July 2017; 5. "The Deepest Sighs, the Frankest Shadows" Released: 9 August 2017; 6. "The Heart Is a Muscle" Released: 29 November 2017

Go Farther in Lightness is the second studio album by Australian alternative rock band Gang of Youths, released on 18 August 2017 by Mosy Recordings. Written entirely by frontman David Le'aupepe, its lyrics focus on "the human experience in all its bleakness and triumph", detailing a mission of finding hope and love amidst personal struggles like loss. The 77-minute rock album also contains three orchestral interludes composed by Le'aupepe.

The release of Go Farther in Lightness was supported by the record-breaking Say Yes to Life Tour in Australia and six singles, including "What Can I Do If the Fire Goes Out?" and "Let Me Down Easy" – the latter became the band's first top 50 single in Australia. The song also polled at number two in Triple J's Hottest 100 of 2017, where three other tracks placed in the top 10. The album debuted at number one on the ARIA Albums Chart, and was certified platinum in Australia by the Australian Recording Industry Association (ARIA) in 2020.

Go Farther in Lightness was acclaimed by music critics and featured in several end-of-year lists. Nominated for eight categories at the ARIA Music Awards of 2017, four awards were won by Gang of Youths – Album of the Year, Best Group, Best Rock Album and Producer of the Year (with Adrian Breakspear). Rolling Stone Australia has listed it among the 200 greatest Australian albums of all time, and at number three in their 50 best albums of 2017. A top position was achieved in the annual Triple J album poll, and two of the tracks featured in the radio station's Hottest 100 of the 2010s.

== Background ==
In a 2017 interview with The Music, Gang of Youths frontman David Le'aupepe discussed the state of his mental health after releasing their debut studio album, The Positions (2015). He said: "I was really broken and fucked up and not in a good way. Better than I was during the actual recording process and during that part of my life, but I wasn't doing well, I don't think." While talking to Richard Kingsmill on Triple J, he added that he "went through a huge year-long writer’s block" and wrote a majority of the songs on Go Farther in Lightness during constant touring in the year prior.

On 6 February 2017, Le'aupepe announced that the album was almost completely finished, set to release on 18 August. He also revealed the band would be relocating to London amidst visa complications for band member Jung Kim.

== Composition ==
=== Production and recording ===
Go Farther in Lightness has been described as an indie rock album. It was recorded in six weeks from November 2016, alongside producer Adrian Breakspear in Darlinghurst, Sydney, and mixed in New York City by Peter Katis. Le'aupepe said the album was "painstakingly put together", but that its production "was like rehab in a way".

"Fear and Trembling"
The opening track "Fear and Trembling" serves as a tribute to "Thunder Road" by Bruce Springsteen, who was a major musical influence for Le'aupepe.

Reflecting on his influences, particularly Bruce Springsteen, the frontman discussed how the opening track "Fear and Trembling" is his "ham-fisted tribute to 'Thunder Road', which is very thinly veiled". In an interview with Triple J, he emphasised the importance of the first track, saying it was a way to "recalibrate Gang of Youths".

Le'aupepe composed three string interludes for Go Farther in Lightness "to give the listener a breather, but also to reinforce some melodic information". They act as a tribute to his classically trained father, who raised David on "everyone from Vivaldi to Puccini and Mozart". Le'aupepe had scored the final compositions, which ran over 450 pages, in three days. Track five, "L'imaginaire", is an interpolation of a Guns N' Roses melody. The second interlude, "Le symbolique", marks the record's half-way point beginning with an "elegant and moving instrumental", before "suddenly the tempo accelerates, and the energy picks up" to transition into "Let Me Down Easy".

=== Lyricism ===
With Le'aupepe as sole songwriter, tracks lyrically focus on his personal struggles. "Do Not Let Your Spirit Wane" was "born out of some big, screwed-up, recurring dream" about "losing something you love", and "Persevere" follows Le'aupepe "having a conversation with the friend who just lost a baby". The frontman's relationship with his father was a major lyrical inspiration, explaining: "I talk about his magnolia tree. I talk about the frailty in old age he’s experiencing, and missing out on the humanity he’s really starting to demonstrate at this age." In contrast to the "cinematic" orchestration of "The Deepest Sighs, the Frankest Shadows", Ben Yung of The Revue wrote that the song "reveals [Le'aupepe's] everyday struggles of loneliness, depression, and anxiety".

Despite these themes, some outlets noted the life-affirming messages and "grand epiphanies" of "The Heart is a Muscle" and album closer "Say Yes to Life", "a track of hope, glory and absolute-total-victory". Al Newstead of Triple J concluded that with these tracks, Le'aupepe is "no longer roaring and snatching victory from the jaws of defeat, but singing like the weight of his emotional baggage is starting to lift". Yung continued that the album is "not solely a message of hope and optimism", but about "humanity and the power of the human spirit".

Greek mythology is referenced throughout the record, particularly in the string-laden "Achilles Come Down", which alludes to the Iliad by Homer and the tragedy of Achilles. Le'aupepe also harshly critiques Ayn Rand's 1957 novel Atlas Shrugged in the single "Atlas Drowned". Opening track "Fear and Trembling" is named after the 1843 book of the same name by Søren Kierkegaard – the frontman also found lyrical inspiration from the literature of Martin Heidegger and Milan Kundera. The three string interludes featuring on Go Farther in Lightness are named after three theories of Jacques Lacan: the Imaginary, Symbolic and Real.

== Release and promotion ==
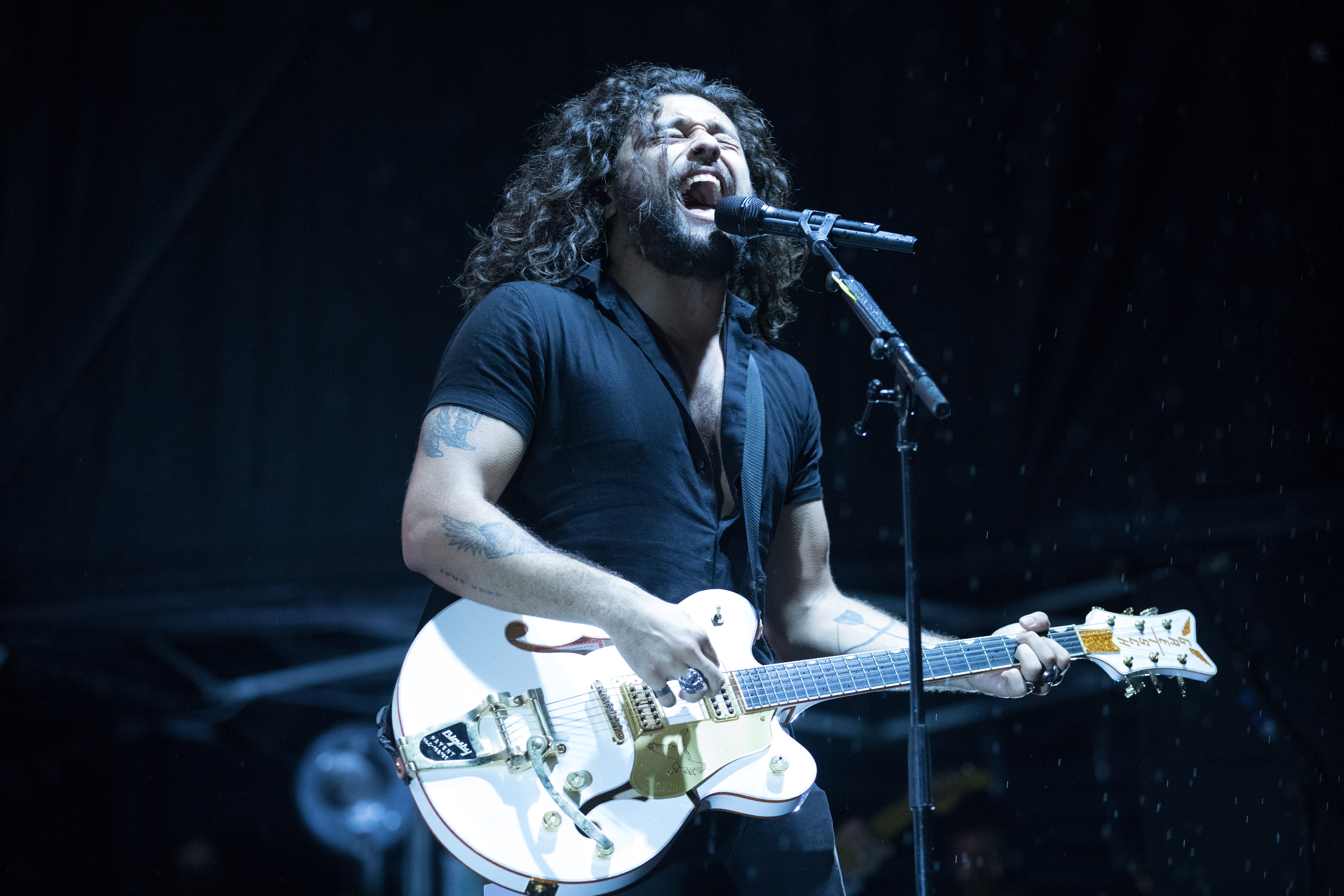
David Le'aupepe fronting the band at Fairgrounds Festival in 2017.

On 6 February 2017, Gang of Youths announced the album's title and scheduled release date of 18 August. A few days later, on 9 February, "What Can I Do If the Fire Goes Out?", was released as the lead single. The band would later perform the song live on Late Night With Seth Meyers in March 2018, making their United States TV debut. Second single "Atlas Drowned" followed on 12 May 2017, alongside the announcement of an Australian tour. On 26 May, "Let Me Down Easy" was released, which became the band's first top 50 single on the ARIA Charts, peaking at number 49. "Keep Me In the Open" was released on 26 July 2017 as the fourth single. A week before the full album release, the fifth single "The Deepest Sighs, the Frankest Shadows" was issued on 9 August, alongside a music video featuring Le'aupepe as a convict escaping through fields in the early morning. The sixth and final single, "The Heart Is a Muscle", was released on 29 November 2017.

Go Farther in Lightness debuted at number one on the ARIA Charts. In 2020, it was certified platinum in Australia by the Australian Recording Industry Association (ARIA), having sold over 70 thousand equivalent units. At the ARIA Music Awards of 2017, it won Album of the Year, Best Group, Best Rock Album and Producer of the Year, the latter won alongside Adrian Breakspear. At the J Awards of 2017, Go Farther in Lightness was nominated for Australian Album of the Year.

== Tour ==
To support Go Farther in Lightness, Gang of Youths embarked on an Australian tour from August to September 2017 with supporting act Gordi. In 2018 the band toured North America, in which they made their US TV debut. While performing in Tennessee, band equipment was stolen from their touring van. Mid-way through the tour, they postponed several shows to December due to Le'aupepe's damaged vocal cords.

Gang of Youths toured Australia again from November 2018 on the Say Yes to Life Tour. All 21 shows in the nationwide circuit sold out, with over 50,000 tickets purchased. The band performed for six nights at the Enmore Theatre in Sydney and eight at the Forum in Melbourne, breaking both venue records for most sold-out shows on a single tour.

== Critical reception ==
Professional ratings
Review scores
| Source | Rating |
|---|---|
| The AU Review | 9.2/10 |
| Dork | 4/5 stars |
| The Music | 4.5/5 stars |
| Rolling Stone Australia | 5/5 stars |
| Sputnikmusic | 5/5 |

Go Farther in Lightness was met with widespread critical acclaim from music critics. In a five-star review for Rolling Stone Australia, Jaymz Clements wrote that it "poetically explores the human experience in all its bleakness and triumph, confusion and clarity, heartbreak and joyousness", calling the record "a remarkable odyssey of an album that'll engulf you". Dylan Marshall of The AU Review called it a "triumph for hope and life", with Rachel Scarsbrook of Renowned for Sound similarly stating the album "doesn’t fall into the trap of becoming too dark and pitiful, instead there is positivity radiating out of its every fibre".

Jamie Muir of Dork concluded the album is a "poetic and gripping body of work that places Gang of Youths as not just an important band, but an important voice in 2017 and beyond". A reviewer for Triple J called Go Farther in Lightness "a stirring collection of music that places Gang of Youths another rank higher in the echelons of Aussie rock bands". Writing for The Music, Jessica Dale called the album "something special" and stated: "Listen to [it] in its entirety; it is phenomenal and deserves nothing less than that."

== Legacy ==
Go Farther in Lightness has led to rankings in several publications' end-of-year lists. Rolling Stone Australia named it the third best album of 2017 and one of the 200 greatest Australian albums of all time. The album also topped the 2017 Triple J Album Poll, as voted by listeners.

Three of the album's tracks featured in Triple J's Hottest 100 of 2017, all in the top ten – peaking at number two with "Let Me Down Easy", followed by "The Deepest Sighs, the Frankest Shadows" at number five and "What Can I Do if the Fire Goes Out?" at number ten. The only other artists to have achieved this feat previously were Powderfinger in 2003 and Chet Faker in 2014. Three more tracks featured in the Hottest 200 of 2017.

In 2020, two tracks from Go Farther in Lightness featured in Triple J's Hottest 100 of the 2010s – "Let Me Down Easy" at number 19 and "The Deepest Sighs, the Frankest Shadows" at number 52. Furthermore, two songs featured in the Hottest 200 of the Decade. Track eight of the album, "Achilles Come Down", was not released as a single, however it has become Gang of Youths' most popular song on both Apple Music and Spotify.

List of appearances on year-end, decade-end and all-time lists
| Publication | List | Rank | Ref. |
|---|---|---|---|
| Double J | 50 Best Albums of 2017 | 40 | |
| Junkee | 50 Best Australian Albums of the Decade | – | |
| Livewire | Best Albums of the Decade | – | |
| Rolling Stone Australia | 50 Best Albums of 2017 | 3 | |
| Rolling Stone Australia | 200 Greatest Australian Albums of All Time | 121 | |
| Sputnikmusic | Top 50 Albums of 2017 | 8 | |
| Sputnikmusic | Top 100 Albums of the 2010s | 24 | |
| The Sydney Morning Herald | Top 20 Albums of 2017 | – | |
| Triple J | Listeners Album Poll | 1 | |
| Uproxx | Best Albums of 2017 | 16 | |

== Track listing ==
All tracks are written by David Le'aupepe.

1. "Fear and Trembling" – 6:03
2. "What Can I Do If the Fire Goes Out?" – 4:56
3. "Atlas Drowned" – 4:31
4. "Keep Me In the Open" – 5:57
5. "L'imaginaire" – 1:30
6. "Do Not Let Your Spirit Wane" – 7:33
7. "Go Farther in Lightness" – 1:48
8. "Achilles Come Down" – 7:02
9. "Persevere" – 4:33
10. "Le symbolique" – 3:51
11. "Let Me Down Easy" – 5:19
12. "The Heart Is a Muscle" – 5:24
13. "Le réel" – 2:22
14. "The Deepest Sighs, the Frankest Shadows" – 5:52
15. "Our Time Is Short" – 5:17
16. "Say Yes to Life" – 5:13

Notes

- Physical versions of this album only list 12 songs, with "L'imaginaire", "Go Farther in Lightness", "Le symbolique" and "Le réel" being listed separately in roman numerals from I–IV.

== Personnel ==
Gang of Youths

- David Le'aupepe – writing, lead vocals, piano, guitar, string arrangements, horn arrangements, engineering
- Joji Malani – lead guitar, horn arrangements
- Max Dunn – bass guitar
- Jung Kim – guitar, keyboards
- Donnie Borzestowski – drums

Additional musicians

- Justin Kearin – horn arrangements, trombone
- Darryl Carthew – horn arrangements, trumpet
- Dave Andrew – piano, keyboard
- Emma Jardine – violin
- Thibaud Hobba – violin
- Ella Jamieson – cello
- Mee Na Lojewski – cello
- Leah Zweck – string contractor
- Tulele Faletolu – backing vocals
- Kris Hodge – backing vocals
- Gloria Mati – backing vocals
- Dee Uluirewa – backing vocals

Technical

- Peter Katis – mixing (tracks 1–4, 6, 9, 11–12, 14, 16)
- Adrian Breakspear – producer, mixing (tracks 5, 7–8, 10, 13, 15), engineering
- Peter Holz – engineering
- Lewis Mitchell – engineering
- Josh Pearson – assistant
- Joe Lambert – mastering

== Charts ==
=== Weekly charts ===
Weekly chart performance for Go Farther in Lightness
| Chart (2017) | Peak position |
|---|---|
| Australian Albums (ARIA) | 1 |

=== Year-end charts ===
2017 year-end chart performance for Go Farther in Lightness
| Chart (2017) | Position |
|---|---|
| Australian Albums (ARIA) | 44 |

2018 year-end chart performance for Go Farther in Lightness
| Chart (2018) | Position |
|---|---|
| Australian Albums (ARIA) | 39 |

== Certifications ==
List of certifications for Go Farther in Lightness
| Region | Certification | Certified units/sales |
|---|---|---|
| Australia (ARIA) | Platinum | 70,000^{‡} |
^{‡} Sales+streaming figures based on certification alone.

== See also ==
- List of number-one albums of 2017 (Australia)
- Say Yes to Life Tour
