= Triple J's Hottest 100 of 2017 =

Australian record chart of songs produced in 2017

2017 Triple J Hottest 100

Countdown details
- Date of countdown: 27 January 2018
- Charity partner: Australian Indigenous Mentoring Experience (AIME)
- Votes cast: 2,286,133

Countdown highlights
- Winning song: Kendrick Lamar "Humble"
- Most entries: Kendrick Lamar; Gang of Youths; Lorde; The Jungle Giants (4 tracks)

Chronology
← Previous; 2016	Next → 2018

The 2017 Triple J Hottest 100 was announced on 27 January 2018. It was the 25th countdown of the most popular songs of the year, as chosen by listeners of Australian radio station Triple J. A record-breaking number of votes were cast (2.386 million).

Kendrick Lamar's "Humble" was voted into first place, making him the first person of colour ever to top a Hottest 100. It was also the first track by a non-Australian artist, and the first hip hop song, to win since 2012's "Thrift Shop". Lamar achieved four tracks in the countdown, as did Gang of Youths (a record-equaling three of which were in the top 10), Lorde, and The Jungle Giants.

Historically, the countdown has been announced on Australia Day (26 January), but the 2017 countdown occurred on the fourth Saturday of January (27 January), due to opposition to Australia Day's celebratory commemoration of British settlement. This is the first Hottest 100 countdown to occur on a different day since the 2003 countdown.

== Background ==
The Triple J Hottest 100 lets members of the public vote online for their top ten songs of the year, with these votes used to identify the year's 100 most popular songs. Any song that premiered between December 2016 and November 2017 was eligible for 2017's Hottest 100. Voting opened 12 December 2017, shortly after the end of the eligibility period.

Several presenters made their votes public. The artists most often voted for by Triple J presenters were: Kendrick Lamar, Lorde, Gang of Youths, and Baker Boy. On 12 December bookmakers Sportsbet, Ladbrokes and CrownBet placed Kendrick Lamar's "Humble" as the most likely song to take out first place, followed by Lorde's "Green Light" and Gang of Youths' "The Deepest Sighs, the Frankest Shadows". Social media measurement projects 100 Warm Tunas and The Bean Counter's 100 also predicted that "Humble" will be voted No. 1 by a significant margin. The previous highest appearance in a Hottest 100 for both Lamar and Lorde is No. 2, with "King Kunta" in 2015 and "Royals" in 2013 respectively.

The station reported that 1.5 million votes had been cast five days before voting closed (17 January 2018), more than any other year at that point in the voting period. Once voting closed, they announced on 23 January that a total of 2,386,133 votes had been cast, breaking the prior year's record for most votes in a Hottest 100 by 5.8%.

=== Announcement date ===
In mid-2016, support grew for a campaign calling on Triple J to change the date of the Hottest 100. Calls were led by Indigenous Australian activists and supporters, many of whom regard Australia Day as "Invasion Day". Australian hip hop duo A.B. Original and their anti-Australia Day single "January 26" were instrumental in drawing support to the cause. Responding to the campaign in September 2016, Triple J established a review over whether the date of the Hottest 100 should be changed.

The review of the date continued into 2017, including consultation with Reconciliation Australia, the National Congress of Australia's First Peoples, and the National Australia Day Council, while 2016's Hottest 100 was held on Australia Day without change. In August 2017, Triple J launched a survey asking for public opinion on whether the date should be changed. Shortly after the survey began, former Triple J presenters Matt Okine and Kyran Wheatley came out in support of a date change.

On 27 November 2017, Triple J announced plans to move the Hottest 100 to the fourth weekend of January. This followed analysis led by Rebecca Huntley and Daniel Stone, of the aforementioned survey, which attracted 64,990 responses, indicating that 60% of listeners supported moving the date.

=== Reactions ===
The announcement was welcomed by many musicians and the Australian Greens. Within the Liberal Party, however, Communications Minister Mitch Fifield was reportedly "bewildered" by the choice, one that MP Alex Hawke described as "disappointing" and "pathetic". As the minister responsible for the government-funded Australian Broadcasting Corporation (ABC), which Triple J is part of, Fifield wrote to the ABC's board of directors on 28 November asking them to return the Hottest 100 to Australia Day.

Some organisations offered alternatives to Triple J's Hottest 100 in response to the date change. These include nationwide rock radio station Triple M broadcasting an Ozzest 100 countdown of only Australian songs on 26 January, and Senator Cory Bernardi's Australian Conservatives publishing an AC100 playlist of Australian music on Spotify.

== Full list ==
Note: Australian artists

#	Song	Artist	Country of origin
1	Humble	Kendrick Lamar	United States
2	Let Me Down Easy	Gang of Youths	Australia
3	Chateau	Angus & Julia Stone	Australia
4	Ubu	Methyl Ethel	Australia
5	The Deepest Sighs, the Frankest Shadows	Gang of Youths	Australia
6	Green Light	Lorde	New Zealand
7	Go Bang	Pnau	Australia
8	Sally	Thundamentals featuring Mataya	Australia
9	Lay It on Me	Vance Joy	Australia
10	What Can I Do If the Fire Goes Out?	Gang of Youths	Australia
11	Sweet	Brockhampton	United States
12	Fake Magic	Peking Duk and AlunaGeorge	Australia/United Kingdom
13	Young Dumb & Broke	Khalid	United States
14	Homemade Dynamite	Lorde	New Zealand
15	Regular Touch	Vera Blue	Australia
16	Feel the Way I Do	The Jungle Giants	Australia
17	Marryuna	Baker Boy featuring Yirrmal	Australia
18	Exactly How You Are	Ball Park Music	Australia
19	The Man	The Killers	United States
20	Let You Down	Peking Duk featuring Icona Pop	Australia/Sweden
21	Birthdays	The Smith Street Band	Australia
22	Lemon to a Knife Fight	The Wombats	United Kingdom
23	Not Worth Hiding	Alex the Astronaut	Australia
24	Rockstar	Post Malone featuring 21 Savage	United States
25	Weekends	Amy Shark	Australia
26	Feel It Still	Portugal. The Man	United States
27	Be About You	Winston Surfshirt	Australia
28	Mystik	Tash Sultana	Australia
29	Mended	Vera Blue	Australia
30	Low Blows	Meg Mac	Australia
31	Lay Down	Touch Sensitive	Australia
32	Numb	Hayden James featuring Graace	Australia
33	Slow Mover	Angie McMahon	Australia
34	DNA	Kendrick Lamar	United States
35	Passionfruit	Drake	Canada
36	I Haven't Been Taking Care of Myself	Alex Lahey	Australia
37	Slide	Calvin Harris featuring Frank Ocean and Migos	United Kingdom/United States
38	Bellyache	Billie Eilish	United States
39	Got on My Skateboard	Skegss	Australia
40	True Lovers	Holy Holy	Australia
41	Blood (Like a Version)	Gang of Youths	Australia
42	Cola	CamelPhat and Elderbrook	United Kingdom
43	Murder to the Mind	Tash Sultana	Australia
44	In Motion	Allday featuring Japanese Wallpaper	Australia
45	Every Day's the Weekend	Alex Lahey	Australia
46	Better	Mallrat	Australia
47	Want You Back	Haim	United States
48	The Comedown	Ocean Alley	Australia
49	Passiona	The Smith Street Band	Australia
50	On Your Way Down	The Jungle Giants	Australia
51	Man's Not Hot	Big Shaq	United Kingdom
52	Glorious	Macklemore featuring Skylar Grey	United States
53	Moments	Bliss n Eso featuring Gavin James	Australia/Ireland
54	Homely Feeling	Hockey Dad	Australia
55	6 Pack	Dune Rats	Australia
56	Watch Me Read You	Odette	Australia
57	Bad Dream	The Jungle Giants	Australia
58	The Opener	Camp Cope	Australia
59	Used to Be in Love	The Jungle Giants	Australia
60	Boys	Charli XCX	United Kingdom
61	21 Grams	Thundamentals featuring Hilltop Hoods	Australia
62	Saved	Khalid	United States
63	Life Goes On	E^ST	Australia
64	Fool's Gold	Jack River	Australia
65	Everything Now	Arcade Fire	Canada
66	Lemon	N.E.R.D and Rihanna	United States/Barbados
67	Shred for Summer	DZ Deathrays	Australia
68	Golden	Kingswood	Australia
69	I Love You, Will You Marry Me	Yungblud	United Kingdom
70	Amsterdam	Nothing But Thieves	United Kingdom
71	Perfect Places	Lorde	New Zealand
72	In Cold Blood	alt-J	United Kingdom
73	Nuclear Fusion	King Gizzard & the Lizard Wizard	Australia
74	XO Tour Llif3	Lil Uzi Vert	United States
75	Braindead	Dune Rats	Australia
76	Cloud 9	Baker Boy featuring Kian	Australia
77	Million Man	The Rubens	Australia
78	Electric Feel (Like a Version)	Tash Sultana	Australia
79	Hey, Did I Do You Wrong?	San Cisco	Australia
80	Say Something Loving	The xx	United Kingdom
81	Liability	Lorde	New Zealand
82	1-800-273-8255	Logic featuring Alessia Cara and Khalid	United States/Canada
83	Blood Brothers	Amy Shark	Australia
84	Oceans	Vallis Alps	Australia
85	Does This Last	Boo Seeka	Australia
86	Maybe It's My First Time	Meg Mac	Australia
87	The Way You Used to Do	Queens of the Stone Age	United States
88	Edge of Town (Like a Version)	Paul Dempsey	Australia
89	Dawning	DMA's	Australia
90	Hyperreal	Flume featuring Kučka	Australia
91	Big for Your Boots	Stormzy	United Kingdom
92	Love	Kendrick Lamar featuring Zacari	United States
93	Do What You Want	The Presets	Australia
94	Second Hand Car	Kim Churchill	Australia
95	Mask Off	Future	United States
96	Chasin'	Cub Sport	Australia
97	Loyalty	Kendrick Lamar featuring Rihanna	United States/Barbados
98	Snow	Angus & Julia Stone	Australia
99	Arty Boy	Flight Facilities featuring Emma Louise	Australia
100	Don't Leave	Snakehips and MØ	United Kingdom/Denmark

=== #101–#200 List ===
On 28 January 2018, Triple J broadcast the second 100 songs of the countdown.

#	Song	Artist	Country of origin
101	Chanel	Frank Ocean	United States
102	Boys Will Be Boys	Stella Donnelly	Australia
103	Lose My Mind	Dean Lewis	Australia
104	List of People (To Try and Forget About)	Tame Impala	Australia
105	Fracture	Slumberjack featuring Vera Blue	Australia
106	Astronaut (Something About Your Love)	Mansionair	Australia
107	Loving Is Easy	Rex Orange County featuring Benny Sings	United Kingdom/Netherlands
108	Sky Walker	Miguel featuring Travis Scott	United States
109	Total Meltdown	DZ Deathrays	Australia
110	Shine	The Smith Street Band	Australia
111	Aunty Tracey's Cookies	Joyride	Australia
112	Run for Cover	The Killers	United States
113	Bad at Love	Halsey	United States
114	My Happiness (Like a Version)	Ball Park Music	Australia
115	East	Vallis Alps	Australia
116	Big Fish	Vince Staples	United States
117	You're in Love with a Psycho	Kasabian	United Kingdom
118	Lady Powers	Vera Blue featuring Kodie Shane	Australia/United States
119	Play It Safe	Seth Sentry	Australia
120	Temptation	Joey Badass	United States
121	Cellar Door	Angus & Julia Stone	Australia
122	Underdog	Banks	United States
123	Raingurl	Yaeji	United States
124	Stranded	Flight Facilities featuring Reggie Watts, Broods and Saro	Australia/United States/New Zealand/United States
125	Lights Out	Royal Blood	United Kingdom
126	The Heart Is a Muscle	Gang of Youths	Australia
127	Never Start	Middle Kids	Australia
128	On Hold (Jamie xx Remix)	The xx	United Kingdom
129	Rockstar City	Alex the Astronaut	Australia
130	Blossom	Milky Chance	Germany
131	That Don't Impress Me Much (Like a Version)	Haim	United States
132	Watch	Billie Eilish	United States
133	My Boo (Like a Version)	Flume featuring Kučka, Vera Blue, Ngaiire and Vince Staples	Australia/Papua New Guinea/United States
134	Love Galore	SZA featuring Travis Scott	United States
135	Hurt	Trophy Eyes	Australia
136	Same Same	Winston Surfshirt	Australia
137	I Want	Ruby Fields	Australia
138	Let It Happen (Like a Version)	Meg Mac	Australia
139	Doomsday	Architects	United Kingdom
140	History	Cosmo's Midnight	Australia
141	Bodies	Wafia	Australia
142	The Remedy	Polaris	Australia
143	Grace Gold	Meg Mac	Australia
144	Hero	George Maple	Australia
145	Better	What So Not and LPX	Australia/United States
146	On the Level	Mac DeMarco	Canada
147	Something For Your M.I.N.D.	Superorganism	United Kingdom
148	Love	Lana Del Rey	United States
149	Beautifully Unconventional	Wolf Alice	United Kingdom
150	Cinderella Dracula	Tired Lion	Australia
151	California	Childish Gambino	United States
152	P Plates	Ruby Fields	Australia
153	Home Soon	Dope Lemon	Australia
154	Yanada	The Preatures	Australia
155	Now or Never	Halsey	United States
156	Jude	Didirri	Australia
157	The Future	Motez featuring Antony & Cleopatra	Australia/United Kingdom
158	Private	Vera Blue	Australia
159	I Dare You	The xx	United Kingdom
160	Sit Next to Me	Foster the People	United States
161	Deadcrush	alt-J	United Kingdom
162	Creature Comfort	Arcade Fire	Canada
163	3WW	alt-J	United Kingdom
164	Nights with You	MØ	Denmark
165	Dream	Bishop Briggs	United Kingdom
166	Line of Sight	Odesza featuring Wynne and Mansionair	United States/Australia
167	Don't Delete the Kisses	Wolf Alice	United Kingdom
168	That Far	6lack	United States
169	Stay for It	RL Grime featuring Miguel	United States
170	Turn Up Your Light	Boo Seeka	Australia
171	Sober	Lorde	New Zealand
172	Drive You Mad	Amy Shark	Australia
173	Rainbow City	Cloud Control	Australia
174	Cigarette	Ali Barter	Australia
175	Say Yes to Life	Gang of Youths	Australia
176	Fear and Trembling	Gang of Youths	Australia
177	I Only Lie When I Love You	Royal Blood	United Kingdom
178	Destiny's	Arno Faraji	Australia
179	Fresh	Tired Lion	Australia
180	Element	Kendrick Lamar	United States
181	Garbage Bin	Tiny Little Houses	Australia
182	High Enough	K.Flay	United States
183	911 / Mr. Lonely	Tyler, the Creator featuring Frank Ocean and Steve Lacy	United States
184	Friend Like You	Bliss n Eso featuring Lee Fields	Australia/United States
185	Dumb Days	Tired Lion	Australia
186	Flow	Crooked Colours	Australia
187	The Louvre	Lorde	New Zealand
188	Happy Place	Alison Wonderland	Australia
189	Butterfly Effect	Travis Scott	United States
190	On + Off	Maggie Rogers	United States
191	Temple	Tonight Alive	Australia
192	Legend Has It	Run the Jewels	United States
193	I Hope You Get It	Crooked Colours featuring Ivan Ooze	Australia
194	Supercut	Lorde	New Zealand
195	Need You Now	Dean Lewis	Australia
196	Hotel	Kita Alexander	Australia
197	Rooting for You	London Grammar	United Kingdom
198	Treetops	Cloud Control	Australia
199	Late Nights	Carmouflage Rose	Australia
200	To Be Free	L D R U	Australia

== Statistics ==
=== Artists with multiple entries ===
#	Artist	Entries
4	Kendrick Lamar	1, 34, 92, 97
4	Gang of Youths	2, 5, 10, 41
4	Lorde	6, 14, 71, 81
4	The Jungle Giants	16, 50, 57, 59
3	Khalid (Note: Twice solo (13, 62), once with Logic (82))	13, 62, 82
3	Tash Sultana	28, 43, 78
2	Angus & Julia Stone	3, 98
2	Thundamentals	8, 61
2	Peking Duk	12, 20
2	Vera Blue	15, 29
2	Baker Boy	17, 76
2	The Smith Street Band	21, 49
2	Amy Shark	25, 83
2	Meg Mac	30, 86
2	Alex Lahey	36, 45
2	Dune Rats	55, 75
2	Rihanna (Note: Once with N.E.R.D. (66), once with Kendrick Lamar (97))	66, 97

=== Countries represented ===
Country	Entries
Australia	65
United States	19
United Kingdom	12
New Zealand	4
Canada	3
Barbados	2
Denmark	1
Sweden	1

=== Records ===
- The Smith Street Band came in at No. 21 for the second year in a row.
- The song "Blood" by The Middle East charted in the countdown for the second time after a cover by Gang of Youths featured at No. 41. The original version charted at No. 64 in 2009. "Electric Feel" by MGMT which came second in 2008, also charted for a second time, after Tash Sultana's cover came in at No. 78.
- Flume made his sixth consecutive appearance in the Hottest 100, having appeared in every annual countdown since 2012.
- Gang of Youths are the third artist to chart three times in the top 10 places after Powderfinger in 2003 and Chet Faker in 2014.
- Lorde's four tracks equals the record for the highest total number of entries from a female artist. She follows Lily Allen, Florence and the Machine and Kimbra, who achieved the same feat in 2006, 2009 and 2011 respectively.

== Top 10 Albums of 2017 ==
The annual Triple J album poll was held across November and December and was announced on 10 December. Three of the top ten albums included singles that were released in 2016 and appeared in that year's Hottest 100.

Note: Australian artists

Bold indicates winner.

#	Artist	Album	Country of origin	Tracks in the Hottest 100
1	Gang of Youths	Go Farther in Lightness	Australia	2, 5, 10
2	Lorde	Melodrama	New Zealand	6, 14, 71, 81
**3**	**Kendrick Lamar**	**Damn**	**United States**	**1, 34, 92, 97**
4	The Smith Street Band	More Scared of You than You Are of Me	Australia	21, 49, (21 in 2016)
5	Childish Gambino	"Awaken, My Love!"	United States	(5, 88 in 2016)
6	Alex Lahey	I Love You Like a Brother	Australia	36, 45
7	The Jungle Giants	Quiet Ferocity	Australia	16, 50, 57, 59
8	Vera Blue	Perennial	Australia	15, 29, (78 in 2016)
9	King Gizzard & the Lizard Wizard	Flying Microtonal Banana	Australia	73
10	Meg Mac	Low Blows	Australia	30, 86
