= The Positions =

Studio album by Gang of Youths
- Released: 17 April 2015
- Studios: Marcata Recording, Hudson Valley
- Genres: Pop rock; modern rock
- Length: 60:25
- Label: Mosy
- Producers: Gang of Youths; Kevin McMahon (Note: Tracks 1, 2 and 7 only); Chris Collins (Note: Track 3 only)

Gang of Youths chronology
The Positions (2015)	Let Me Be Clear (2016)

Singles from The Positions
- 1. "Poison Drum" Released: 1 May 2014; 2. "Radioface" Released: 19 March 2015; 3. "Magnolia" Released: 13 August 2015

The Positions is the debut studio album by Australian alternative rock band Gang of Youths, released on 17 April 2015 through Mosy Recordings. Written by frontman David Le'aupepe over three years, his lyrics reflect personal struggles including the breakdown of his marriage following his then-wife's cancer diagnosis and his suicide attempt. Produced mostly by the band and Kevin McMahon, the album lingered in development for years, with constant re-recordings owing to Le'aupepe's perfectionism.

Supported by three singles including the band's breakout hit "Magnolia", The Positions debuted at number five on the ARIA Albums Chart. It earned the band three nominations at the 2015 ARIA Awards, for Breakthrough Artist, Best Rock Album and Best Cover Art, as well as Australian Album of the Year at the J Awards of 2015. In 2021, Rolling Stone Australia ranked The Positions at number 89 in their list of the 200 greatest Australian albums of all time.

== Background ==
In 2011, David Le'aupepe was 18 years old when he met his first wife who, at the time, was going through chemotherapy for metastasised melanoma. The couple wed when he was 21. When her cancer intensified, Le'aupepe began writing songs as a coping mechanism. He contacted several childhood friends to form Gang of Youths in 2012. His marriage broke down over the ensuing years.

On the night of 3 June 2014, after a week-long bender, Le'aupepe attempted suicide while heavily drunk, stumbling towards a train station. He said it was the third or fourth time he tried to end his life. His concerned friends called the police who intercepted and sat him underneath a magnolia tree, inspiring their song "Magnolia".

== Composition ==
=== Songwriting ===
Le'aupepe is the sole lyricist on The Positions. Across two or three years, he wrote 40 songs. While living and writing in Nashville, Tennessee, Le'aupepe took imaginal inspiration from the sweeping, grandiose landscapes around him. The album's narrative is centred around the health of his ex-wife and their collapsing relationship—he has retrospectively labelled it "the cancer album". The album's storytelling is nonlinear: Le'aupepe shuffled the track listing to have "The Overpass" as the closing track, ending with a sense of hope and "against-the-odds valiance", while the album's true lyrical end point is in the middle. He also aimed to write in a conversational, fluid style, inspired by Paul Kelly and Mark Knopfler. The Positions is named in reference to Leonard Cohen's 1984 album Various Positions. Le'aupepe liked how the title represented "‘the positions’ of [his] grief and yearning and fear and desire."

"The Diving Bell"
As one of David Le'aupepe's core musical inspirations, "The Diving Bell" recalls the sound of Bruce Springsteen's "I'm on Fire".

The sound of The Positions was heavily inspired by U2's The Joshua Tree, an album which Le'aupepe described as his "beacon light". Journalist Mark Mordue found its lyricism owing to Bruce Springsteen's Born to Run. Reviewing for Happy, music writer Nick Stillman likened "The Diving Bell" and "Magnolia" to power anthems from the 1980s, while other comparisons were made to the work of 2007 indie bands including Arcade Fire and Kings of Leon. Music critics have described The Positions as a pop album, but one that "exist[s] on the very outer limits of pop," according to Joseph Earp of Renowned for Sound. Stillman agrees that it contains catchy hooks and melodies and a meticulous production, but its lyrical depth pushes the album beyond pop sensibilities. Other genre descriptors have included pop rock and modern rock.

=== Production ===
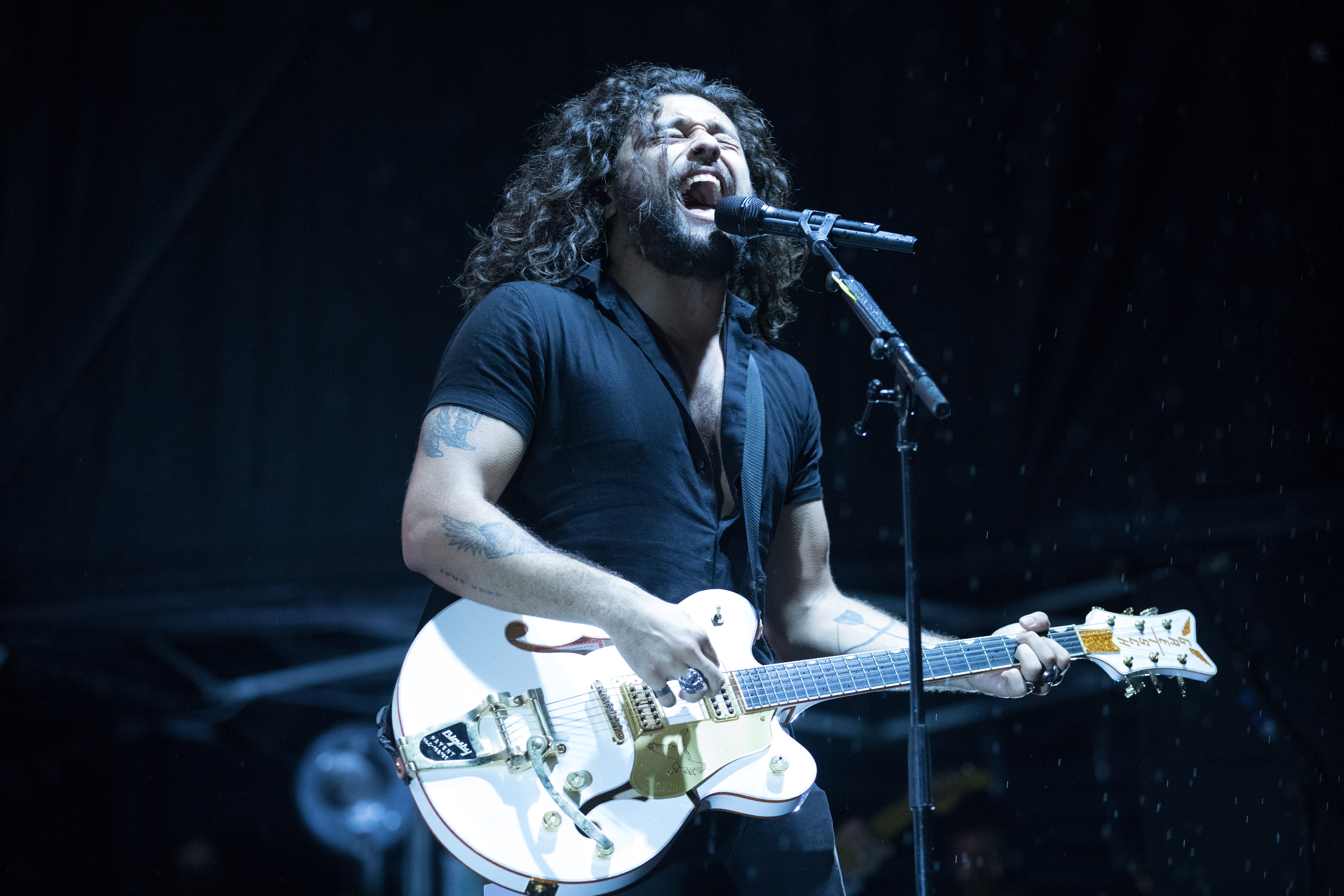
Le'aupepe blamed The Positions' lengthy production on his perfectionism.

Six of the album's 10 tracks were self-produced. Kevin McMahon, whom the band approached due to his work with Titus Andronicus and Swans, is credited for production on three tracks. The band worked in McMahon's studio, Marcata Recording, in Hudson Valley, New York. Chris Collins also produced alongside the band on "The Diving Bell". Peter Katis was responsible for most of the mixing. With a "sprawling and expansive" soundscape, the average song length is six minutes, and no track is less than four.

Recording and production took an exceptionally long time, spanning three years and facing persistent delays. Le'aupepe, a perfectionist, said that: "Every single fucking time we’re putting the final touches on the record we just veer away from it." He called almost every song on the album a "holy pain in the ass to finish." "Radioface" and "The Overpass" were constantly re-recorded. "The Diving Bell" made the final track listing after being scrapped in 2013, and it was re-written just one week before recording wrapped up. "Magnolia" was similarly composed at the last minute.

== Release and promotion ==
Because of its lengthy production process, the album's release was delayed, initially slated for September 2014. Songs were still being engineered by Adrian Breakspear in June 2014. Le'aupepe was hopeful this would be finished by the end of July, with mastering done by August, looking to an early 2015 release. He blamed himself entirely for the pushbacks, as he was "obsessed with making something [he] wouldn’t hate".

Gang of Youths issued the lead single "Poison Drum" on 1 May 2014, supported by a music video and two headline shows. On 19 March 2015, "Radioface" was released and the band officially announced the album's details. Issued as the third single, "Magnolia" received a music video on 13 August 2015. Upon release, The Positions was feature album on national youth radio broadcaster Triple J and Sydney community station FBi Radio. It debuted at number five on the ARIA Albums Chart. The band toured extensively in support of The Positions with a sold-out run of Australian capital cities in May 2015, followed by a 24-date regional leg from August to September 2015. In April 2016, they toured nationally again to larger venues, with all shows selling out.

At the 2015 ARIA Awards, The Positions earned Gang of Youths three nominations: Breakthrough Artist, Best Rock Album and Best Cover Art. Adrian Breakspear and Peter Holz were also nominated for Engineer of the Year for "Radioface". At the 2015 J Awards, The Positions was nominated for Australian Album of the Year, but lost to Courtney Barnett's Sometimes I Sit and Think, and Sometimes I Just Sit.

== Critical reception ==
Professional ratings
Review scores
Source	Rating
The AU Review	9/10
The Music	4.5/5 stars
Rolling Stone Australia	4.5/5 stars
The Sydney Morning Herald	4/5 stars

The Positions received widespread critical acclaim. Colin Delaney of The Sydney Morning Herald called it an "accomplished record with an international sound", while Renowned for Sound's Joseph Earp described it a "triumph" from a band "destined for some very good things."

Its concept and difficult subject matter was highly regarded. Reviewing for The Music, Roshan Clerke commended Le'aupepe's lyricism as holding "some of the most empowering sentiments to be found in modern rock music." Rod Yates of Rolling Stone Australia said the album is "so emotionally bruised and honest that it at times feels like you're listening in on a conversation between frontman Dave Le'aupepe and the girl in question."

== Legacy ==
In 2021, Rolling Stone Australia ranked The Positions at number 89 in their list of the 200 greatest Australian albums of all time. Sosefina Fuamoli wrote the album "set the bar high" for Gang of Youths, and that it propelled the band "onto radars everywhere in what felt like rapid time."

Le'aupepe has spoken about how recording and touring The Positions brought "enormous calamity" onto his life, leading to the breakdown of his marriage and continued mental health decline. However, the album also provided emotional relief; he reflected on his state before its release: "I was never able to compartmentalise and express the feelings I had about that relationship with people properly. I used to be very non-verbal about stuff."

== Track listing ==
All lyrics are written by David Le'aupepe.

1. "Vital Signs" – 7:23
2. "Poison Drum" – 6:26
3. "The Diving Bell" – 4:53
4. "Restraint & Release" – 4:41
5. "Magnolia" – 5:11
6. "Kansas" – 4:08
7. "Knuckles White Dry" – 6:10
8. "Radioface" – 6:52
9. "Sjamboksa" – 7:12
10. "The Overpass" – 7:29

Bonus disc: Juices... B-sides & Demos

1. "Strange Diseases" (Early Demo) – 7:23
2. "Evangelists" – 6:26
3. "A Sudden Light" (Early Demo) – 4:53
4. "Benevolence Riots" – 4:41
5. "Lover in My Lungs" – 5:11

== Personnel ==
Adapted from the album's liner notes.

Gang of Youths

- David Le'aupepe – writing, vocals (all tracks); guitar (1–5, 8–10), percussion (3), keyboard (3–6), piano (5, 7), strings (5–6)
- Sam O'Donnell – drums (2, 8, 9), percussion (3), vocals (3)
- Jung Kim – guitar (1–4, 8–10), keyboard (1, 3–5, 8), percussion (3), vocals (3), strings (4)
- Max Dunn – bass guitar (1–5, 8–10), percussion (3), vocals (3), strings (4)
- Donnie Borzestowski – drums (4, 10)
- Joji Malani – guitar (1–5, 8–10), keyboard (4, 5), percussion (3), vocals (3), strings (4–5)

Other musicians

- Jane Scarpantoni – strings, cello (1, 7)
- James Felice – piano (1)
- Kevin McMahon – guitar (1, 7), percussion (2, 7), keyboard (7)
- Stella McMahon – percussion (2)
- Chris Collins – percussion (3)
- Joel van Gastel – drums (3, 5)
- Jamal Ruhe – guitar (7)
- Edward M. Mackenzie – spoken vocals (8)
- Benjamin Reisemann-Jeffrey – horns (8)

Technical

- Greg Calbi – mastering (1–10)
- Kevin McMahon – production (1–2, 7), engineering (1–2, 8, 10), mixing (7)
- Peter Holz – engineering (1, 4–5, 8–10)
- Adrian Breakspear – engineering (1, 8–10)
- Christina Thiers – engineering (1, 4, 8–10)
- Peter Katis – mixing (1–2, 6, 8–9)
- Chris Collins – production (3), engineering (3), mixing (3–4)
- Gang of Youths – production (3–6, 8–10)
- Donnie Borzestowski – engineering (4, 10)
- Jung Kim – engineering (4–5, 10)
- David Le'aupepe – engineering (5–6)
- Joji Malani – engineering (5)
- Nora Wever – engineering (5)
- Karl Cashwell – engineering (5), mixing (5, 10)
- David J. Andrew – engineering (6)

Artwork

- Rachela Nardella – photography
- Callum van de Mortel – photography
- Nathan Johnson – artwork design

== Charts ==
Chart performance for The Positions
Chart (2015)	Peak position
Australian Albums (ARIA)	5

== Certifications ==
Region	Certification	Certified units/sales
Australia (ARIA)	Gold	35,000^{‡}
^{‡} Sales+streaming figures based on certification alone.
