= Let Me Down Easy (Gang of Youths song) =

2017 single by Gang of Youths

Single by Gang of Youths

from the album Go Farther in Lightness
- Released: 26 May 2017
- Studio: Sony Music, Sydney
- Genre: Baroque pop
- Length: 5:19
- Label: Mosy Recordings, Sony
- Songwriter: David Le'aupepe
- Producers: Adrian Breakspear, Gang of Youths

Gang of Youths singles chronology
"Atlas Drowned" (2017)	"Let Me Down Easy" (2017)	"The Deepest Sighs, the Frankest Shadows" (2017)
- Mixing Engineer: Peter Katis

"Let Me Down Easy" is a song by Australian alternative rock band Gang of Youths, released on 26 May 2017, via Mosy Recordings, as the third single off their sophomore album, Go Farther in Lightness (2017). The song peaked at No. 49 on the ARIA Singles Chart and achieved double platinum certification by the Australian Recording Industry Association (ARIA) in 2019.

The song has featured on multiple editions of the Triple J Hottest 100 countdown. It was voted in at No. 2 in the Hottest 100 of 2017, No. 19 in the Hottest 100 of the 2010s, and No. 60 in the Hottest 100 of Australian Songs. The song also placed second in the 2018 Vanda & Young Global Songwriting Competition.

== Background ==
Gang of Youths released "Let Me Down Easy" via their personal label, Mosy Recordings, on 26 May 2017. It was released as the third single in promotion of their sophomore studio album, Go Farther in Lightness, which arrived on 18 August 2017. The song was recorded at Sony Music Studios, Sydney between November and December 2016 and was produced by Gang of Youths and Adrian Breakspear.

== Accolades and awards ==
"Let Me Down Easy" peaked at No. 49 on the ARIA Top 50 Singles chart, becoming the band's first hit single in their career. As part of Triple J's annual listener-voted countdown poll, the Triple J Hottest 100, the song was voted in at No. 2 in the Hottest 100 of 2017 countdown poll, marking the highest position achieved by an Australian artist that year. In the Hottest 100 of the 2010s, held in 2020, the song was voted in at No. 19. In 2025, the song was voted in at No. 60 as part of Triple J's Hottest 100 of Australian Songs. It was certified double platinum, for shipments of 140,000 units, by ARIA in 2019. For the song, Le'aupepe placed second in the 2018 Vanda & Young Global Songwriting Competition.

== Reception ==
Simon Tubey of X-Press magazine reviewed the album and described the track as having an "upbeat tempo and catchy hook making it an instantly distinctive 'festival banger', which any crowd would love. The distinctive oriental sound only serves to cement the song's uniqueness."

== Charts ==
Chart (2018)	Peak position
Australia (ARIA)	49

== Certifications ==
Region	Certification	Certified units/sales
Australia (ARIA)	2× Platinum	140,000^{‡}
New Zealand (RMNZ)	Gold	15,000^{‡}
^{‡} Sales+streaming figures based on certification alone.
