= What Can I Do If the Fire Goes Out? =

Single by Gang of Youths

from the album Go Farther in Lightness
- Released: 10 February 2017
- Length: 4:55
- Label: Mosy Recordings, Sony Music Australia
- Songwriter(s): David Le'aupepe
- Producer(s): Adrian Breakspear, Gang of Youths

Gang of Youths singles chronology
"Strange Diseases" (2016)	"What Can I Do If the Fire Goes Out?" (2017)	"Atlas Drowned" (2017)

"What Can I Do If the Fire Goes Out?" is a song by Australian alternative rock band, Gang of Youths, released on 10 February 2017 as the lead single from their second studio album, Go Farther in Lightness (August 2017). It reached No. 13 on the ARIA Hitseekers Singles Chart. It was listed at number 10 on the Triple J Hottest 100, 2017. The song was certified platinum by ARIA.

== Music video ==
The music video was released on 20 April 2017.

== Track listings ==
Digital download
No.	Title	Length
1.	"What Can I Do If the Fire Goes Out?" (single version)	4:55

Digital download
No.	Title	Length
1.	"What Can I Do If the Fire Goes Out?" (radio edit)	3:44

== Certifications ==
Region	Certification	Certified units/sales
Australia (ARIA)	Platinum	70,000^{‡}
^{‡} Sales+streaming figures based on certification alone.
