= Adrian Breakspear =

English record producer, audio engineer and mixing engineer

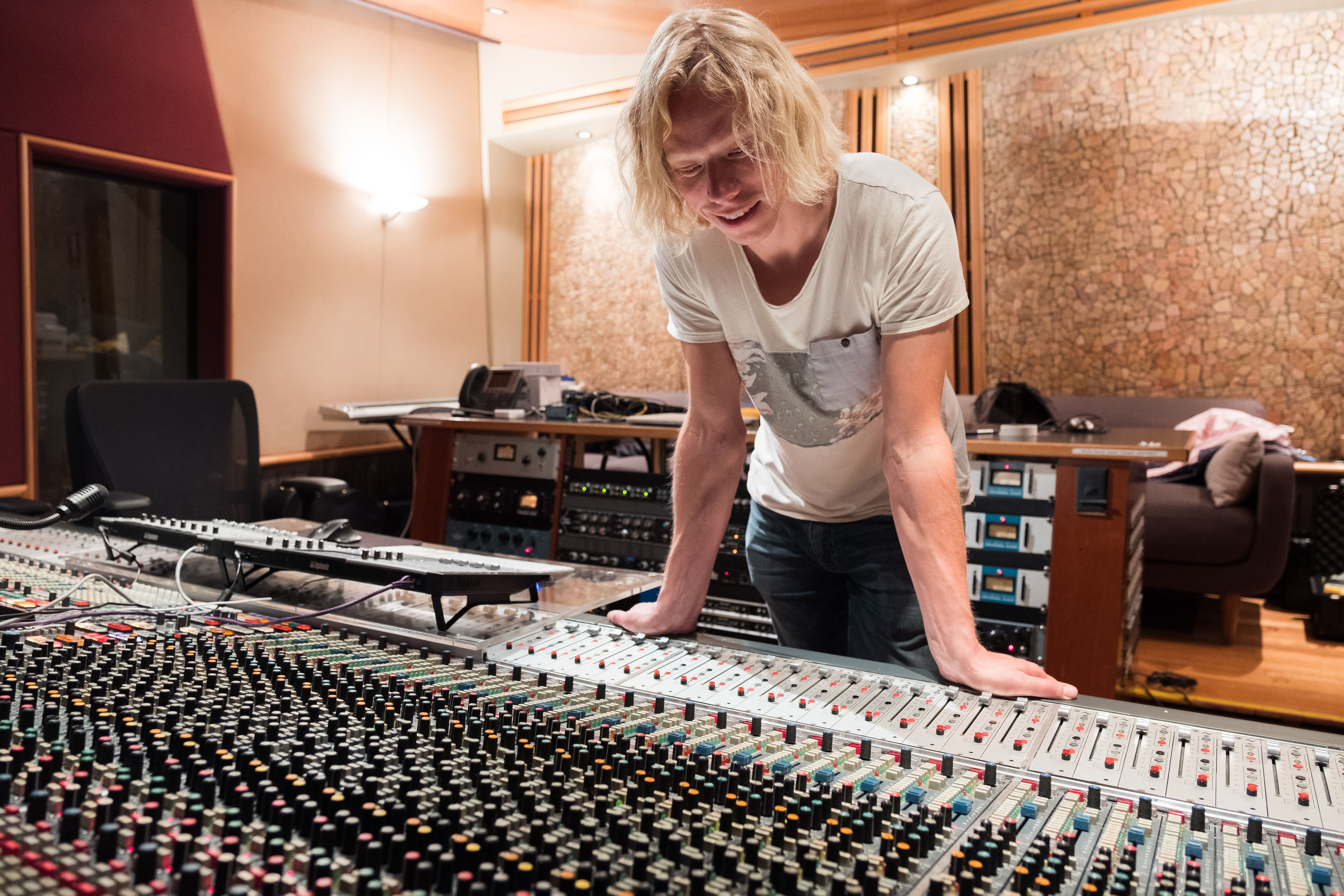

Background information
- Born: 15 March 1980 (age 46)
- Origin: England
- Occupations: Record producer; audio engineer; mixing engineer
- Website: www.adrianbreakspear.com

Adrian Breakspear is an English record producer and audio engineer based in Sydney, Australia. He is known for his work with Gang of Youths, Boy & Bear, Ricky Martin and Pharrell Williams.

At the 57th Annual Grammy Awards, he was nominated for co-producing Williams's 2014 album Girl. (Note: Breakspear is listed among 12 producers for Girl) He received a nomination for Engineer of the Year at the 29th Annual ARIA Awards for his work on Gang of Youths's single "Radioface", (Note: Engineer of the Year shared with Peter Holz in 2015 for "Radioface") and won Producer of the Year at the 31st Annual ARIA Awards for his work alongside Gang of Youths on their album Go Farther in Lightness (2017).

In 2020, he had a cameo role in the Helen Reddy biopic I Am Woman.

== Selected discography ==
Year	Artist	Album	Role
2009	The Saturdays	Work (Single)	Engineer
2010	Di-Rect	This Is Who We Are	Engineer
2011	Di-Rect	Time Will Heal Our Senses	Engineer
2012	Jack Robert Hardman	Jack Robert Hardman	Mix Engineer
2013	Ricky Martin	Come With Me (Single)	Engineer
2014	Pharrell Williams	Girl	Engineer
2014	The Collective	Burn The Bright Lights (Single)	Producer
2014	Tayler Henderson	Burnt Letters	Producer
2015	Gang of Youths	Radioface (Single)	Producer
2015	Gang of Youths	The Positions	Producer, Engineer
2015	Example	Whisky Story (Single)	Engineer
2016	Delta Goodrem	Dear Life	Engineer
2016	Gang of Youths	Strange Diseases (Single)	Engineer
2016	Delta Goodrem	Wings of The Wild	Engineer
2016	Various Artists	Dream Lover - The Bobby Darin Musical (The Original Cast Recording	Mix Engineer, Engineer
2016	Gangs of Youth	Let Me Be Clear EP	Engineer
2017	Gang of Youths	Go Farther In Lightness	Producer
2018	DMA's	In The Air (Acoustic)	Mix Engineer
2018	Various Artists	Muriels Wedding The Musical (The Original Cast Recording)	Mix Engineer, Engineer
2019	Alanna Vullo	Breathless (Single)	Songwriter, Producer
2020	Johnny Hunter	Early Trauma EP	Producer
2020	The Two Romans	Everything Now!	Producer
2020	CLEWS	Feel (Single)	Producer
2020	Good Dog	Stay And Rest For A While (Single)	Mix Engineer
2020	Josh Pyke	Revisions EP	Producer
2020	Good Dog	Hopeless Man (Single)	Mix Engineer
2020	Georgia Mae	Soul Like This (Single)	Producer
2020	Good Dog	A Lost Love Takes a Long Time to Die (Single)	Mix Engineer
2020	Alanna Vullo	We Fall (Single)	Songwriter, Producer
2020	pinkiscool	Lose My Mind (Single)	Producer

== Awards and nominations ==
=== ARIA Awards ===
The ARIA Music Awards, hosted by the Australian Recording Industry Association (ARIA), recognise "excellence and innovation across all genres" of music in Australia.

Breakspear has won one award from three nominations.

List of awards and nominations at the ARIA Awards
Year	Category	Nominated work	Result	Ref.
2015	Engineer of the Year	"Radioface" (alongside Peter Holz)	Nominated	
2017	Producer of the Year	Go Farther in Lightness (alongside Gang of Youths)	Won	
2017	Engineer of the Year	Go Farther in Lightness	Nominated	

=== Grammy Awards ===
The Grammy Awards are awarded annually by The Recording Academy of the United States for outstanding achievements in the music industry.

List of awards and nominations at the Grammy Awards
Year	Category	Nominated work	Result	Ref.
2015	Album of the Year	Girl	Nominated	

== Filmography ==
List of film and television appearances
Year	Title	Role	Note	Ref.
2020	I Am Woman	Cameo	Helen Reddy biopic	
