= The Heart Is a Muscle (song) =

Single by Gang of Youths

from the album Go Farther in Lightness
- Released: 29 November 2017 (single); 16 March 2018 (radio edit)
- Length: 5:23 (album); 3:34 (radio edit)
- Label: Mosy Recordings, Sony Music Australia
- Songwriter: David Le'aupepe
- Producers: Adrian Breakspear; Gang of Youths

Gang of Youths singles chronology
"The Deepest Sighs, the Frankest Shadows" (2017)	"The Heart Is a Muscle" (2017)	"Still Unbeaten Life (Live in Melbourne)" (2018)

"The Heart Is a Muscle" is a song by Australian alternative rock band Gang of Youths from their second studio album Go Farther in Lightness (2017). It was released as the album's fifth and final single on 29 November 2017. The song was written by band frontman David Le'aupepe, and it placed third in the 2018 Vanda & Young Global Songwriting Competition. "The Heart Is a Muscle" also peaked at number 37 on the US Adult Alternative Songs chart, becoming the band's first charting track on the chart. It achieved certified gold status in Australia in 2019.

A music video for "The Heart Is a Muscle" was released on 29 November 2017. At the ARIA Music Awards of 2018, its director Patrick Rohl received a nomination for Best Video.

The song was used by Fox Sports (Australia) to promote the 2018 NRL season.

== Charts ==
Chart (2018)	Peak position
US Adult Alternative Airplay (Billboard)	37

== Certifications ==
Region	Certification	Certified units/sales
Australia (ARIA)	Gold	35,000^{‡}
^{‡} Sales+streaming figures based on certification alone.
