= Gang of Youths =

Australian rock band

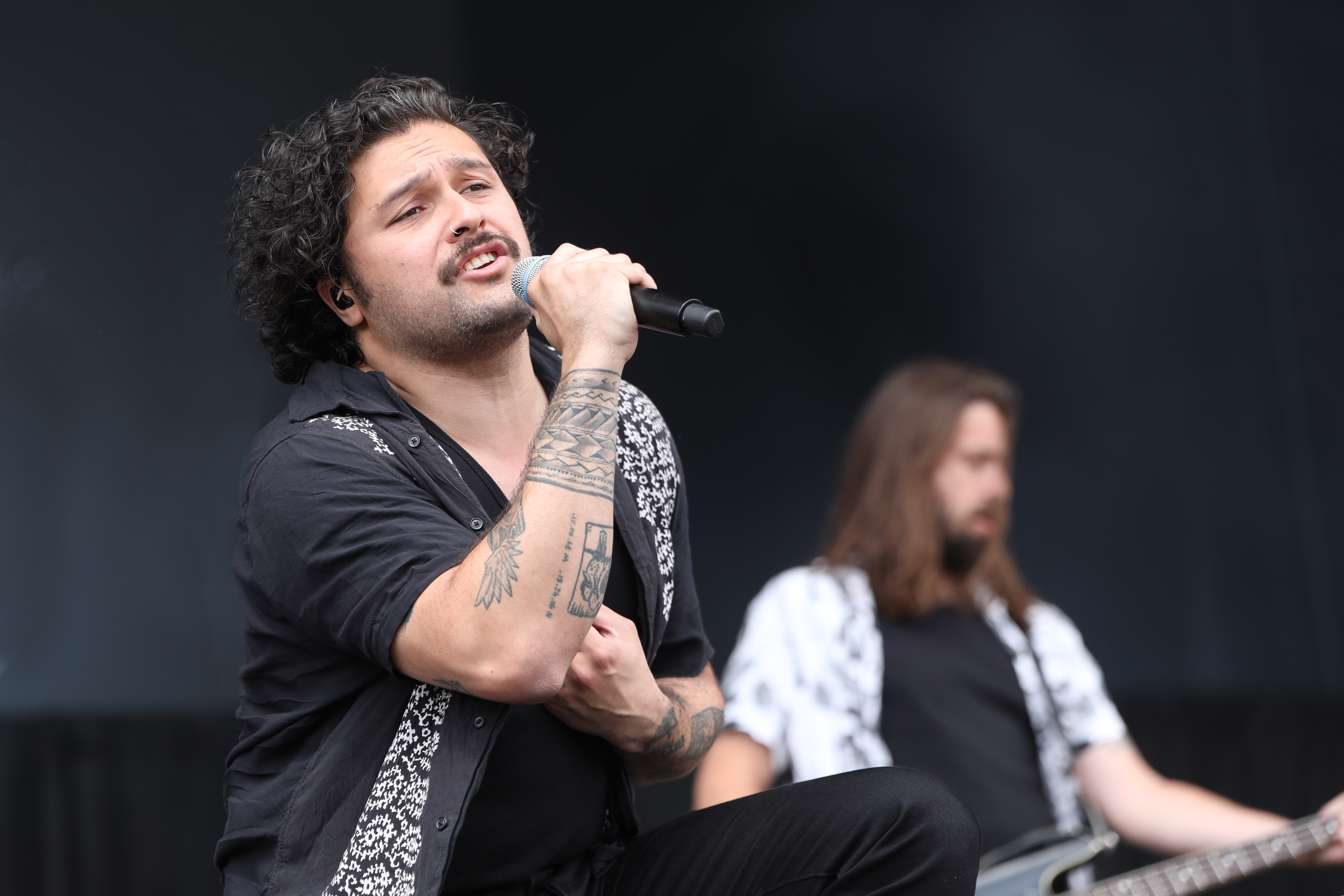
- David Le'aupepe (left) and Max Dunn (right) performing with the band in Nuremberg, 2022.

Background information
- Origin: Sydney
- Genres: Indie rock, alternative rock
- Works: Discography
- Years active: 2012–present
- Labels: Mosy/Sony; Warner
- Members: David Le'aupepe; Jung Kim; Donnie Borzestowski; Tom Hobden
- Past members: Joji Malani; Sam O'Donnell; Max Dunn
- Website: www.gangofyouths.com

Gang of Youths are an Australian alternative rock band from Sydney that formed in 2012. The band was founded by chief songwriter and lead vocalist David Le'aupepe; he has been joined by Jung Kim on guitar and keyboards since the band's inception, as well as Donnie Borzestowski on drums since 2014 and Tom Hobden on violin, rhythm guitar and keyboards since 2020. The band's debut studio album The Positions (2015) received multiple ARIA Award nominations and peaked at number five on the Australian albums chart. It provided the single "Magnolia", which has been described as their breakthrough hit and was certified platinum in 2018.

In 2017 Gang of Youths released their second studio album, Go Farther in Lightness, which was preceded by their first Australian top 50 single, "Let Me Down Easy". The album debuted at number one in Australia and was nominated for eight awards at the 2017 ARIA Music Awards, winning four – Album of the Year, Best Group, Best Rock Album and Producer of the Year (for the group and Adrian Breakspear). For the Triple J Hottest 100 of 2017, the band's songs were listed at three positions in the top 10, a feat only achieved twice before. The group's 2018 Say Yes to Life Tour, in support of Go Farther in Lightness, broke several records in Australia.

Their third studio album, Angel in Realtime, was released in 2022 and debuted at number one in Australia and number 10 in the United Kingdom. It was nominated in three categories at the 2022 ARIA Awards; while at the 2022 J Awards it won Album of the Year. Its lead single, "The Angel of 8th Ave.", is their second Australian top 50 hit. An accompanying extended play, Immolation Tape, followed in May 2022 featuring acoustic renditions of the parent album's tracks. The band's fourth album, Compañero, is scheduled for release in March 2027.

== History ==
=== 2012–2013: Formation to debut single ===
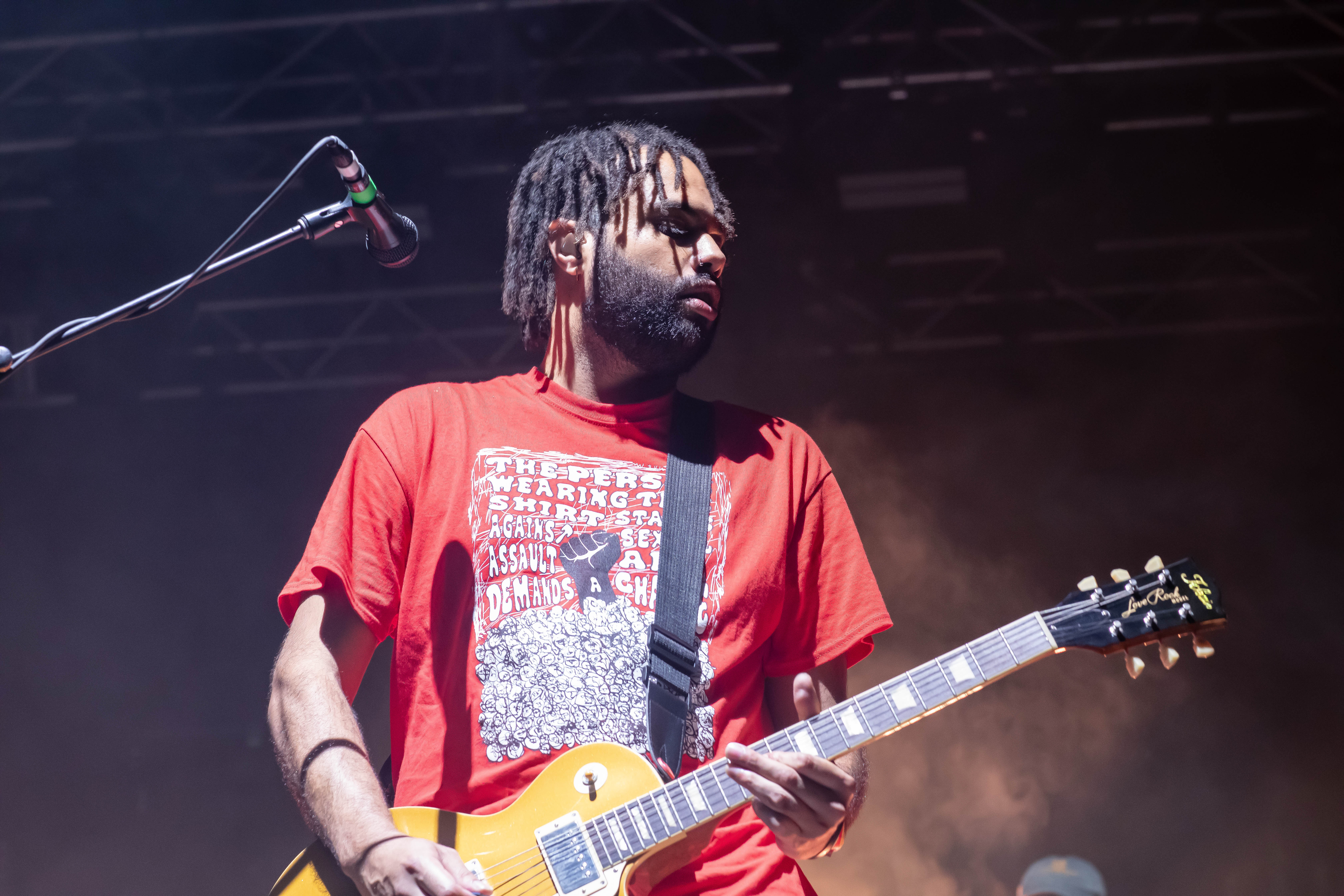
Founding lead guitarist, Joji Malani, performing at St Jerome's Laneway Festival, February 2019

Gang of Youths were formed in Sydney in 2012 by Max Dunn on bass guitar, David Le'aupepe on lead vocals, rhythm guitar and piano, Jung Kim on guitar and keyboards, Joji Malani on lead guitar and Sam O'Donnell on drums. Le'aupepe and Malani met in 2002, both aged 10, attending Hillsong, an evangelical church in northern Sydney. Later they befriended O'Donnell and Chicago-born Kim at the church's youth group. Although Le'aupepe described himself during this time as a "loner", and stated that while "I still align myself with Jesus," he was "just not a great poster-boy for it." In 2008, after leaving his previous school, Le'aupepe attended Mosman High School, where he continued performing his own songs at school concerts, along with Harley Streten (later known as Flume). Le'aupepe on vocals and Streten on saxophone covered Curtis Mayfield's "Move On Up", when they were about 16-years-old. Also, at Mosman High was New Zealand-born Max Dunn, who befriended Le'aupepe during their final year of secondary education, 2009.

Gang of Youths' first gig was at Sydney's Hibernian House on 21 June 2012, supporting local band Tigertown. Tigertown's drummer Kurt Bailey was so impressed with the show that he dropped his own performance career to become their manager. They also became friends with co-leader of Tigertown, Kurt's sister Charlie Collins, and in 2022 (after Tigertown had broken up) she played as their support act both in the UK and Australia.

For the next five months, the band practised and recorded demos until their next gig in late December of that year. They started playing regular support slots in small Sydney venues and local community radio station FBi Radio began playing some of their tracks, including "A Sudden Light" and "Strange Diseases". Word spread of their impressive live show and on 27 February 2013, they played their first headline show, at the re-opening of nightclub Candy's Apartment.

The band released their first single, "Evangelists", on 16 August 2013 and were featured on national youth radio Triple J's Unearthed segment. They then embarked on a national tour, supporting alternative rockers Cloud Control. Madeleine Laing of The Music caught their show at The Tivoli, Brisbane in August, but was disappointed, as "No one speaks to, or makes any effort to connect with, the crowd through the entire set." Whereas AAA Backstage's reviewer, at the same gig, found they were "making an outstandingly melancholy noise as I enter" with "their lead singer possessing one of the most wonderfully rich voices I have heard in recent months."

=== 2013–2016: The Positions and Let Me Be Clear ===
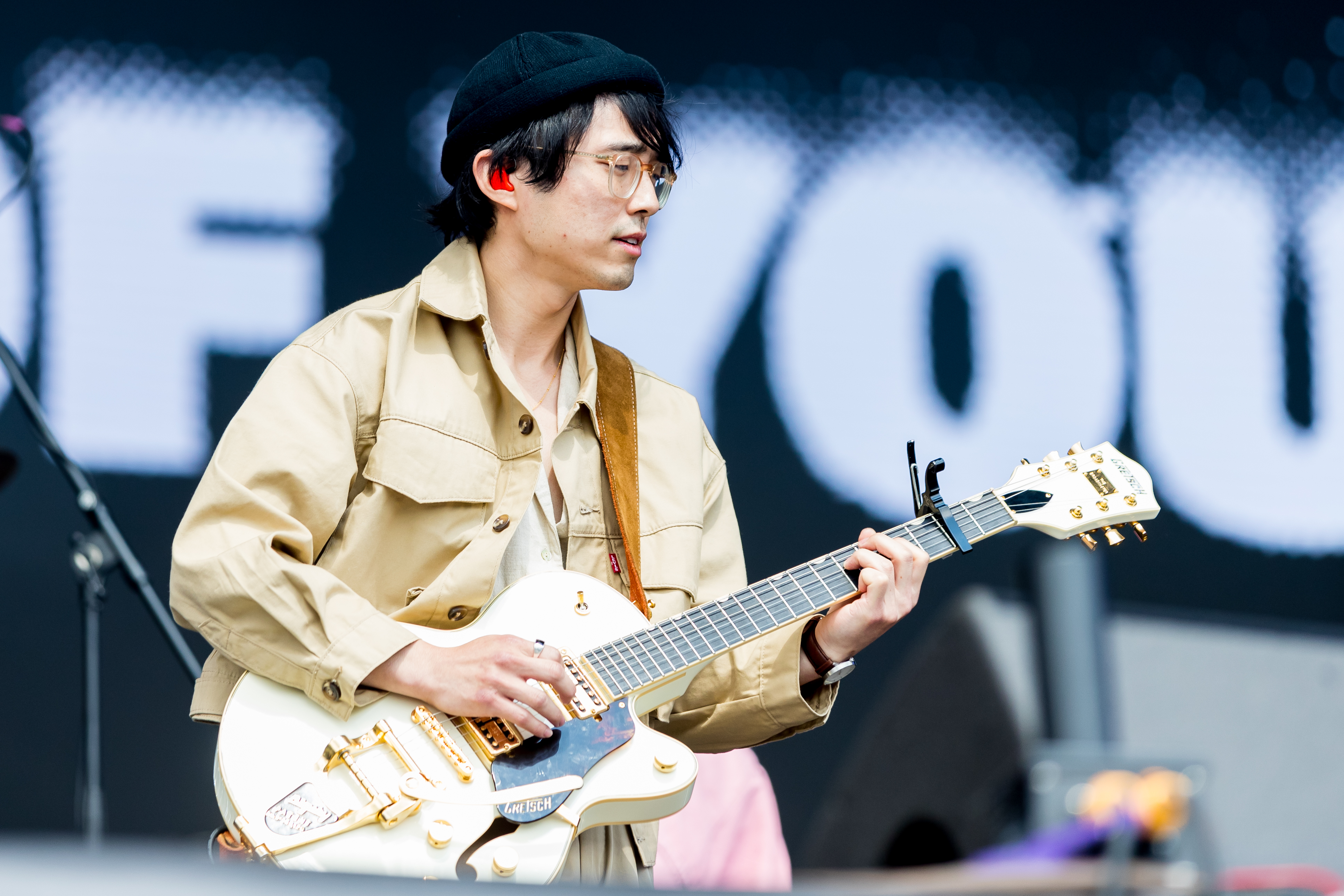
Founding mainstay Jung Kim on guitar, Rock am Ring, Nürburgring racetrack, Nürburg, Germany, June 2022

They started work on their debut album, The Positions, in 2013. In September that year, initial tracks were recorded at New York's Marcarta Recording studio with Kevin McMahon (Real Estate, Titus Andronicus). By June 2014 they were finishing tracks at the Sony Music Australia recording studios, Sydney. Drums on the album were shared between O'Donnell, Novacastrian Dom "Donnie" Borzestowski and session drummer Joel van Gastel (of Jenny Broke the Window). In October 2014 O'Donnell left the band and was replaced on drums by Borzestowski. Le'aupepe is the album's sole songwriter and his lyrics on The Positions describe his relationship with his former wife, her melanoma diagnosis and treatment for the cancer, their separation and his substance abuse, depression and suicide attempts.

The band performed at South by Southwest festival, Austin, Texas, in March 2014. The Positions was issued in April 2015 and peaked at No. 5 on the ARIA albums chart in May. At the ARIA Music Awards of 2015, Gang of Youths received five nominations: Breakthrough Artist – Release, Best Rock Album, Best Cover Artist (by Nathan Johnson) for The Positions, Engineer of the Year (Adrian Breakspear, Peter Holz) for "Radioface", and Best Australian Live Act for the Gang of Youths National Tour. In December, they were recognised as the Live Act of the Year of 2015 and Best Domestic Tour by Renne Woollams for The AU Review. Their single "Magnolia" came in at No. 21 in the Triple J Hottest 100, 2015.

In June 2016 their single, "Strange Diseases", was released, which was followed on 29 July by its associated six-track EP Let Me Be Clear. The five original songs on the EP were written as potential material for The Positions album, whilst the sixth track is a cover version of "Both Sides, Now" by Joni Mitchell. The EP reached No. 2 on the ARIA Albums Chart. The band played at Splendour in the Grass in that month.

=== 2017–2018: Go Farther in Lightness ===
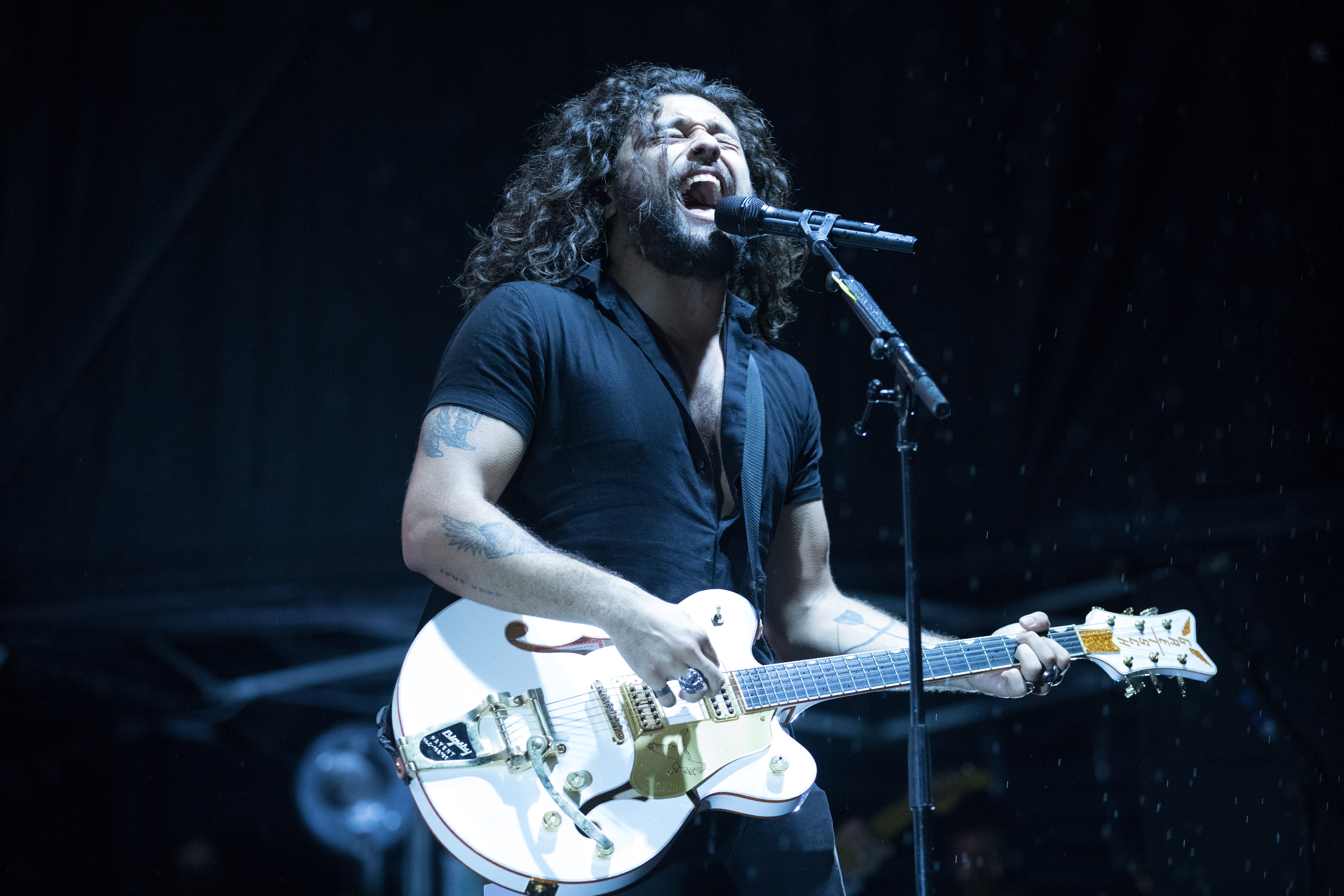
Le'aupepe fronting the band at Fairgrounds Festival, Berry, December 2017.

In February 2017, the band finished recording their second album, Go Farther in Lightness, which was issued on 18 August. The band relocated to London amidst issues with the renewal of Kim's Australian Visa. In April and May, the band toured the United Kingdom and continental Europe, followed by a June tour of the United States. An Australian national tour in September followed Go Farther in Lightness, after which the band returned to London for another UK and European tour in October. Three tracks from the album were listed in the Triple J Hottest 100, 2017, taking out second, fifth and tenth positions. Their song "The Heart Is a Muscle" was used by Fox Sports (Australia) to promote the 2018 NRL season. The same year, the band released a cover of David Bowie's "'Heroes'" (1977), which was featured in the trailers for the film Justice League.

On 12 March 2018, the group made their US television debut on Late Night with Seth Meyers, performing their single "What Can I Do If the Fire Goes Out?". In July, the band were the first artists to perform on MTV Unplugged Australia. The concert was recorded at the Cobblestone Pavilion in Melbourne's Metropolitan Meat Market and released on 26 October 2018. On 30 September, they played before the NRL Grand Final in front of a crowd of 82,688 at ANZ Stadium, Sydney.

Gang of Youths toured Australia again from November 2018 on their Say Yes to Life Tour. All 20 shows in the circuit were sold out, with over 33,000 tickets purchased. The band performed for six nights at the Enmore Theatre, Sydney and eight at the Forum, Melbourne; breaking both venue records for most sold-out shows on a single tour. Further, they supported Foo Fighters for seven nights in the US during their Concrete and Gold Tour in October 2018, and Mumford & Sons for 16 nights during the European leg of their Delta Tour in April–May 2019, and the US and Mexican legs in September–October 2019.

=== 2019–2022: Total Serene and Angel in Realtime ===
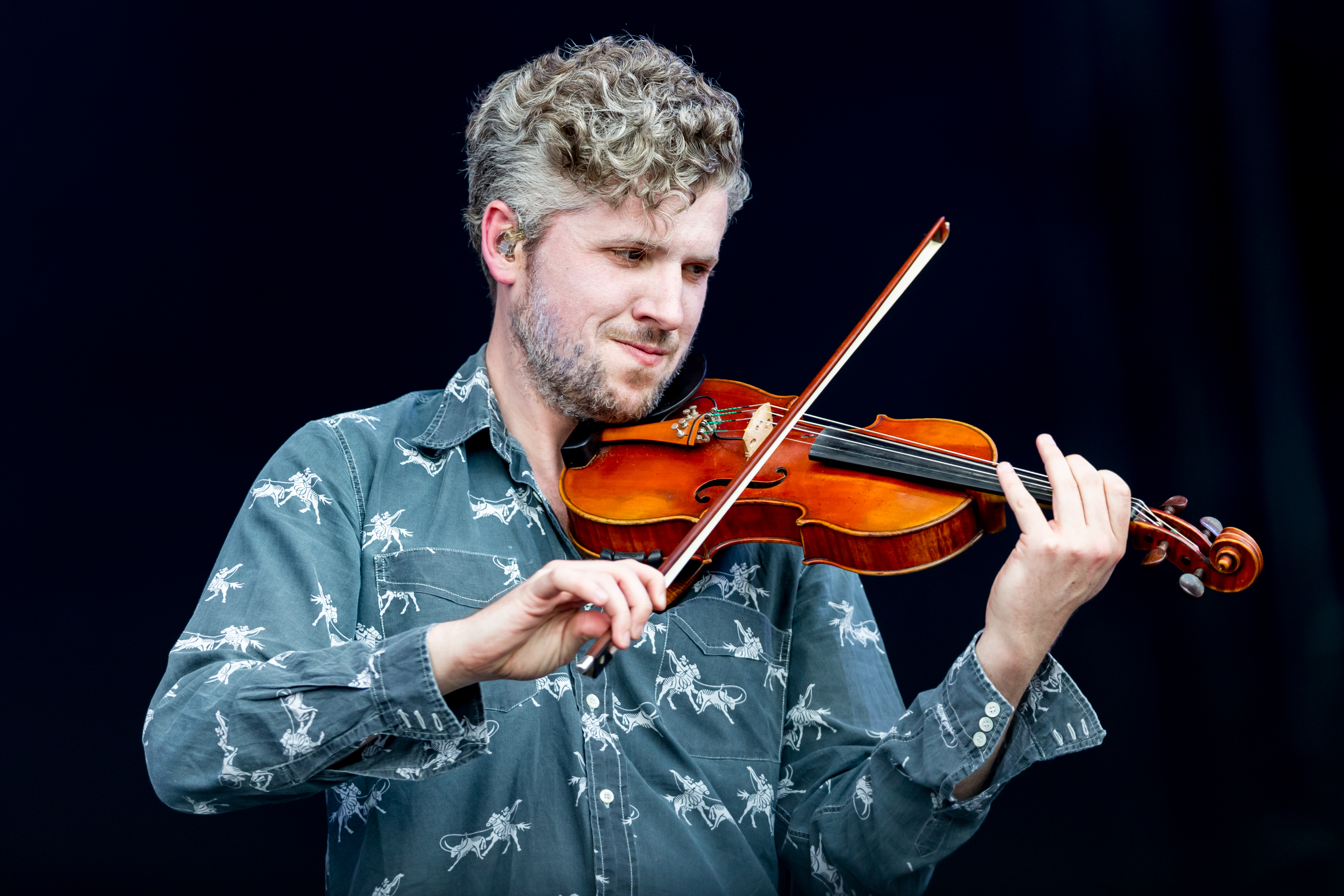
Tom Hobden, formerly of Noah and the Whale, joined the band in 2020.

L-R: Borzestowski, Kim, Dunn and Le'aupepe performing at Fighting Cocks, Kingston, England, February 2022.

In September 2019 Le'aupepe announced that the band's third studio album was expected in 2020. He added that the lyrics will deal with his father Teleso "Tattersall" Le'aupepe's death in 2018. In an interview with a Reuters correspondent, he declared: "[it's] about my father and how he died, and how he lived, and everything I found out about him. That's the only thing I can really write about. It's gonna be about him … and about the people I love".

On 9 October 2019 the band announced that Malani would leave the band; his last gig with Gang of Youths was opening for Mumford & Sons in Oklahoma City on 11 October 2019. Malani returned to Sydney to focus on his family; he later performed as Pei and released a solo single, "Honest", in May 2022. He was replaced in Gang of Youths by multi-instrumentalist Tom Hobden on violin, rhythm guitar and keyboards (ex-Noah and the Whale and ex-touring member of Mumford & Sons). Hobden's first gig with the band was on 17 February 2020 at Omeara, London.

In October 2020 the band posted footage to their social media account of recording their then untitled third album. A self-produced single, "The Angel of 8th Ave" was released on 15 June 2021. In an interview with NME, Le'aupepe said that they had "scrapped 2 versions of the album," and it would be released "at some point in the next year or so". A three-track EP, Total Serene, was released on 16 July 2021. On 1 December the band performed "The Angel of 8th Ave" on American TV programme, The Late Show with Stephen Colbert.

Their third album, Angel in Realtime, was released on 25 February 2022, alongside a world tour and single "Tend the Garden". Josh Leeson of Newcastle Herald rated the album at four-out-of-five stars and observed, "It's essentially a concept album... [but] more than a grief-stricken son losing his father"; the group provided "a cinematic accompaniment that's all strings, and urgent drums and guitar" – they aimed for greatness and "land agonisingly close". It peaked at number one in Australia and top ten on UK and Scottish albums charts.

On 20 May 2022, the band surprise released their third EP Immolation Tape. It contains three early demos of songs on Angel in Realtime – "In the Wake of Your Leave", "Forbearance" and "Spirit Boy", as well as a cover of "Shot in the Arm" by Wilco.

=== 2026–present: Compañero ===
In March 2026, following several years of inactivity, the band were announced on the line-up for the All Points East festival at Victoria Park, as curated by Twenty One Pilots. In June 2026, the band announced two homecoming shows at the Sydney Opera House, making their debut in the venue. An accompanying press photo confirmed that co-founding bassist Max Dunn had exited the band, converting the band into a quartet. On 28 July 2026, they announced that they would play on 6 August 2026 at Anita's Theatre in Thirroul, New South Wales.

On 18 August 2026, the band released "Things Take Time". The band explains that the single, which Le'aupepe said reflects the band's growth, is "not really about anything in particular, other than the endless loop of birth, growth, death and rebirth which encases all matter and energy".

On 12 November 2026, the band announced their fourth studio album Compañero, and shared its second single "Benny's Video". The album is scheduled for release on 12 March 2027.

== Band members ==
Current members

- David Le'aupepe – lead vocals, rhythm guitar, piano (2012–present)
- Jung Kim – keyboards, piano (2012–present), lead guitar (2019–present), rhythm guitar (2012–2019)
- Donnie Borzestowski – drums (2014–present), backing vocals (2017–present)
- Tom Hobden – violin, rhythm guitar, keyboards (2020–present)

Current touring musicians

- Louis Giannamore – percussion, rhythm guitar, piano (2021–present), drums (2021–present; select shows, substitute for Donnie Borzestowski)
- James Larter – percussion, marimba (2021–2022, 2026–present), piano (2026–present)
- Gretta Ray – backing vocals (2022, 2026–present), rhythm guitar (2026–present)
- Andrew Burgess – bass, rhythm guitar, backing vocals (2026–present)

Former members

- Sam O'Donnell – drums (2012–2014)
- Joji Malani – lead guitar, backing vocals (2012–2019)
- Max Dunn – bass guitar, backing vocals (2012–2024), keyboards (2017–2024)

Former touring musicians

- Simon Matafai – backing vocals, piano (2022)

== Discography ==
- The Positions (2015)
- Go Farther in Lightness (2017)
- Angel in Realtime (2022)
- Compañero (2027)

== Tours ==
=== Australian tours ===
- National tour, May 2014
- National tour, July–August 2014
- Benevolence Riots Tour, 2015
- National tour, 2015
- National tour, 2016
- National tour, 2017
- Say Yes to Life Tour, 2018

=== International tours ===
- North America and UK tour, 2016
- UK tour, April–May 2017
- UK tour, October 2017
- North America tour, 2018
- Angel in Realtime Tour (Australia, Europe, North America), 2022

=== Opening act ===
- Foo Fighters – Concrete and Gold Tour (North America), 2018
- Mumford & Sons – Delta Tour (Europe), 2019

== Awards ==
=== APRA Awards ===
The APRA Awards are held in Australia and New Zealand by the Australasian Performing Right Association to recognise songwriting skills, sales and airplay performance by its members annually. They commenced in 1982.

Year	Nominee / work	Award	Result	Ref.
2018	"What Can I Do If the Fire Goes Out?"	Song of the Year	Nominated	
2019	"The Deepest Sighs, the Frankest Shadows"	Rock Work of the Year	Nominated	
2022	"The Angel of 8th Ave."	Most Performed Rock Work	Nominated	
2022	"The Angel of 8th Ave."	Song of the Year	Shortlisted	
2023	"The Man Himself"	Most Performed Alternative Work of the Year	Nominated	

=== ARIA Music Awards ===
The ARIA Music Awards is an annual awards ceremony that recognises excellence, innovation, and achievement across all genres of Australian music. Gang of Youths have won 4 awards from 20 nominations.

Year	Nominee / work	Award	Result
2015	The Positions	Breakthrough Artist	Nominated
2015	The Positions	Best Rock Album	Nominated
2015	The Positions	Best Cover Art	Nominated
2015	Gang of Youths National Tour	Best Australian Live Act	Nominated
2015	"Radioface"	Engineer of the Year	Nominated
2016	Let Me Be Clear	Best Rock Album	Nominated
2016	Gang of Youths National Tour	Best Australian Live Act	Nominated
2017	Go Farther in Lightness	Album of the Year	Won
2017	Go Farther in Lightness	Best Group	Won
2017	Go Farther in Lightness	Best Rock Album	Won
2017	Go Farther in Lightness	Best Cover Art	Nominated
2017	Gang of Youths & Adrian Breakspear – Go Farther in Lightness	Producer of the Year	Won
2017	Adrian Breakspear – Go Farther in Lightness	Engineer of the Year	Nominated
2017	Daniel and Jared Daperis – "The Deepest Sighs, the Frankest Shadows"	Best Video	Nominated
2017	Gang of Youths	Best Australian Live Act	Nominated
2018	Gang of Youths 2017 National Tour	Best Australian Live Act	Nominated
2018	Patrick Rohl for Gang of Youths – "The Heart Is a Muscle"	Best Video	Nominated
2019	MTV Unplugged (Live in Melbourne)	Best Original Soundtrack or Musical Theatre Cast Album	Nominated
2019	Say Yes to Life Tour	Best Australian Live Act	Nominated
2021	"The Angel of 8th Ave."	Best Group	Nominated
2022	Angel in Realtime	Album of the Year	Nominated
2022	Angel in Realtime	Best Group	Nominated
2022	Angel in Realtime	Best Rock Album	Nominated
2022	Angel in Realtime Tour	Best Australian Live Act	Nominated
2026	"Things Take Time"	Best Group	Nominated
2026	"Things Take Time"	Best Alternative Release	Nominated
2026	Gang of Youths	Best Australian Live Act	Nominated

=== Helpmann Awards ===
The Helpmann Awards is an awards show, celebrating live entertainment and performing arts in Australia, presented by industry group Live Performance Australia since 2001. Note: 2020 and 2021 were cancelled due to the COVID-19 pandemic.

Year	Nominee / work	Award	Result	Ref.
2018	Australia 2017	Best Australian Contemporary Concert	Nominated	

=== J Awards ===
The J Awards are an annual series of Australian music awards that were established by the Australian Broadcasting Corporation's youth-focused radio station Triple J. They commenced in 2005.

Year	Nominee / work	Award	Result	Ref.
2015	The Positions	Australian Album of the Year	Nominated	
2017	Go Farther in Lightness	Australian Album of the Year	Nominated	
2022	Angel in Realtime	Australian Album of the Year	Won	

=== National Live Music Awards ===
The National Live Music Awards (NLMAs) commenced in 2016 to recognize contributions to the live music industry in Australia.

Year	Nominee / work	Award	Result	Ref.
2016	Gang of Youths	Live Act of the Year	Nominated	
2016	Gang of Youths	NSW Live Act of the Year	Won	
2016	David Le'aupepe (Gang of Youths)	Live Voice of the Year	Nominated	
2017	Gang of Youths	Live Act of the Year	Won	
2017	Gang of Youths	People's Choice – Live Act of the Year	Won	
2017	Gang of Youths	NSW Live Act of the Year	Won	
2017	David Le'aupepe (Gang of Youths)	Live Voice of the Year	Won	
2017	Joji Malani (Gang of Youths)	Live Guitarist of the Year	Nominated	
2018	Gang of Youths	International Live Achievement (Band)	Won	
2018	Gang of Youths	NSW Live Act of the Year	Won	
2019	Gang of Youths	International Live Achievement (Band)	Won	
2023	Emile Frederick (Gang of Youths)	Best Stage & Light Design	Nominated	

=== Rolling Stone Australia Awards ===
The Rolling Stone Australia Awards are awarded annually in January or February by the Australian edition of Rolling Stone magazine for outstanding contributions to popular culture in the previous year.

Year	Nominee / work	Award	Result	Ref.
2022	"The Angel of 8th Ave."	Best Single	Nominated	
2023	Angel in Realtime	Best Record	Won	
2023	Gang of Youths	Rolling Stone Global Award	Nominated	

=== Vanda and Young Global Songwriting competition ===
The Vanda & Young Global Songwriting Competition is an annual competition that "acknowledges great songwriting whilst supporting and raising money for Nordoff-Robbins" and is coordinated by Albert Music and APRA AMCOS. It commenced in 2009.

Year	Nominee / work	Award	Result
2014	"Poison Drum" (David Le'aupepe)	Vanda & Young Global Songwriting Competition	3rd
2018	"Let Me Down Easy" (David Le'aupepe)	Vanda & Young Global Songwriting Competition	2nd
2018	"The Heart Is a Muscle" (David Le'aupepe)	Vanda & Young Global Songwriting Competition	3rd
