= David Le'aupepe =

Australian musician

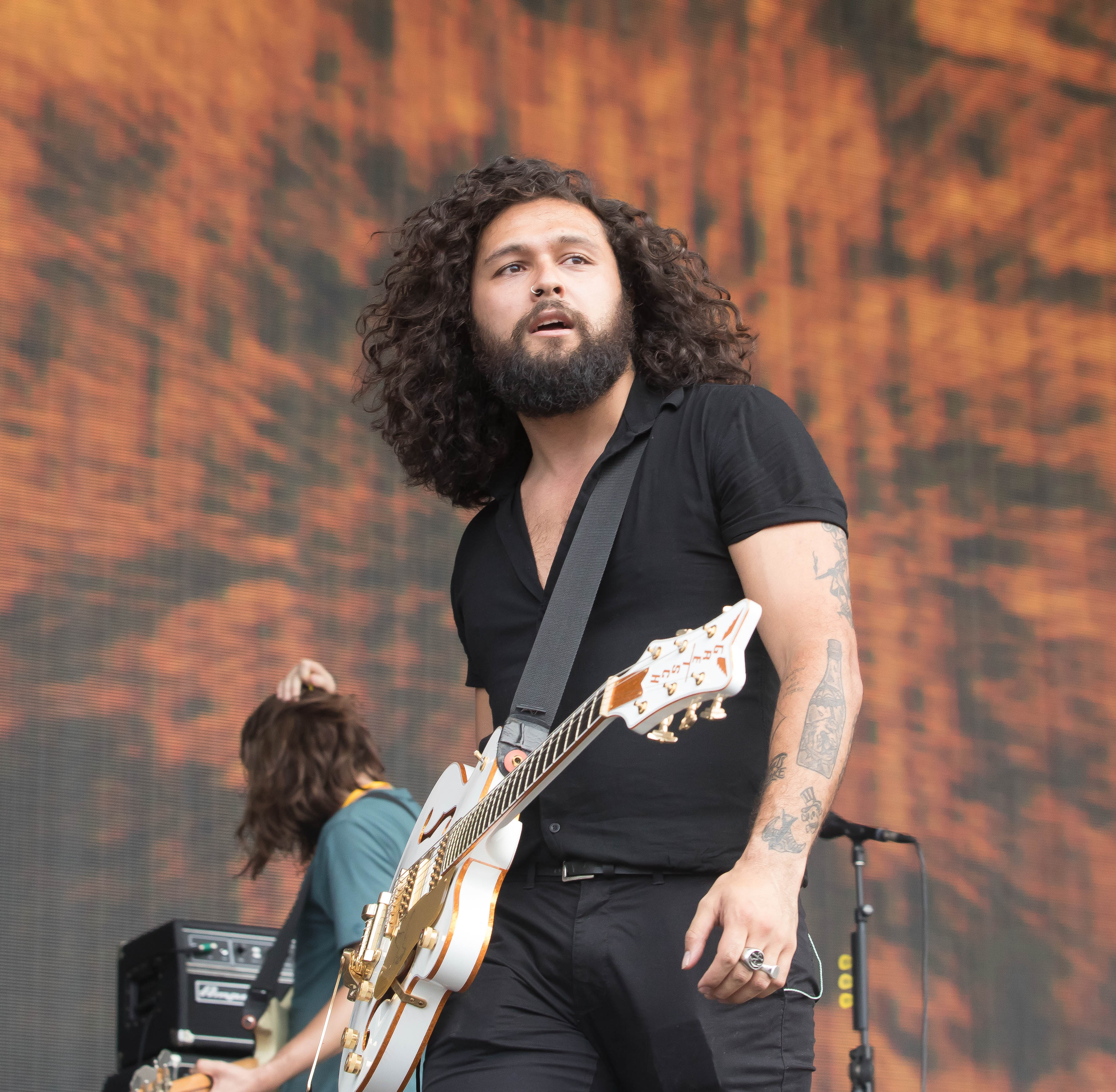
- Le'aupepe performing with Gang of Youths in 2018
- Born: 27 February 1992 (age 34); Inner West, Sydney, New South Wales, Australia
- Occupations: Singer; songwriter; guitarist; pianist
- Musical career
- Genres: Rock; alternative rock
- Instruments: Vocals, guitar, piano
- Label: Mosy Recordings
- Member of: Gang of Youths

David Immanuel Menachem Sasagi Le’aupepe (born 27 February 1992) is an Australian singer, songwriter, guitarist and frontman of alternative rock band Gang of Youths, which he founded in 2011. He served as the sole songwriter on the band's first two albums, The Positions (2015) and Go Farther in Lightness (2017), finding lyrical inspiration from personal hardships including loss. Following the death of his father in 2018, the band's most recent album, Angel in Realtime (2022), is a reflection on Le'aupepe's grieving process and family identity.

== Early life ==
David Immanuel Menachem Sasagi Le’aupepe was born on 27 February 1992, and raised in the Inner West of Sydney by his Samoan father, and his mother, an Austrian-Jewish social worker.

He started playing music at the age of seven, and was proficient at drums, bass guitar and piano, in hopes of becoming a multi-instrumentalist. He was nine when he began performing in a Baptist church. In his youth, he was heavily influenced by rock artists including Bruce Springsteen, and recalled that watching a live recording of "Born to Run" made him intent on pursuing music as a career: "that was when I knew I needed to do this for real". Le'aupepe states that he was raised on classical music, and that in the production of Gang of Youths' second studio album Go Farther in Lightness (2017), it "felt very natural to employ devices that would have normally been used by, say, Vivaldi or Bach".

== Personal life ==
=== Mental health ===
In 2014, Le'aupepe attempted suicide by stepping in front of a car while heavily intoxicated, on a "week-long bender that precluded sleep and eating". His friends, aware of his state, called the police who were able to intervene and take Le'aupepe to rehabilitation. He later documented this experience in the band's breakout 2015 single, "Magnolia".

"I can’t play anything as well as the other guys can. I’m not a good-enough songwriter. Our whole career has been informed by my impostor syndrome."

— David Le'aupepe

Le'aupepe has been open about his experiences with imposter syndrome. In a 2021 interview with The Guardian, writer Sian Cain claimed the frontman "hates his voice, his lyrics and both of their previous albums". Le'aupepe also claims he is a perfectionist. In an interview with Pilerats before the release of The Positions (2015), the frontman responded to a question regarding the album's release timeframe, commenting on the year-long rollout: "Sometimes I’ll wake up and listen to the record and I’m okay with it. Other times I’ll wake up and we’ll have to change it", adding: "I’m a perfectionist, I’m nuts, I’m insane".

Le'aupepe has discussed how the success of Gang of Youths in Australia badly damaged his mental health, saying: "Our fame in Australia actually fucked me up really badly".

=== Relationships ===
In 2011, Le'aupepe met his first wife, and they married when he was 21. He would write songs for her while she was receiving chemotherapy for metastasised melanoma.

Le'aupepe met his second wife in New York City in 2017. The couple live in London.

=== Family ===
His father Teleso died of cancer in 2018, but before he died, he hinted that there were a number of family secrets to be discovered in Polynesia. David Le'aupepe and his wife travelled to Samoa, where it was revealed his father had disappeared to Australia in the 1970s, leaving behind two sons who both thought he had died. Further, Teleso was actually ten years older than he claimed, and was not brought up in New Zealand as purported, rather Samoa. He wrote about this in the song "Brothers".

== Discography ==
=== Gang of Youths ===
For a full list of Gang of Youths releases, see Gang of Youths discography.

- The Positions (2015)
- Go Farther in Lightness (2017)
- Angel in Realtime (2022)

=== As featured artist ===
| Song | Year | Album |
|---|---|---|
| "Drover" (by Dan Sultan) | 2018 | Killer |
| "Love and War" (by Thelma Plum) | 2019 | Better in Blak |
| "Worldly-wise" (by Gretta Ray) | 2021 | Begin to Look Around |
| "All In My Head" (by Middle Kids) | 2024 | Faith Crisis Pt 1 |
