= APRA Music Awards of 2016 =

Australasian music awards in 2016

- Date: 5 April 2016
- Location: Carriageworks, Sydney, Australia
- Hosted by: Brian Nankervis
- Website: apraamcos.com.au/awards/2016-awards

The Australasian Performing Right Association Awards of 2016 (generally known as APRA Awards) are a series of related awards which include the APRA Music Awards, Art Music Awards, and Screen Music Awards. The APRA Music Awards of 2016 was the 34th annual ceremony by the Australasian Performing Right Association (APRA) and the Australasian Mechanical Copyright Owners Society (AMCOS) to award outstanding achievements in contemporary songwriting, composing and publishing. The ceremony was held on 5 April 2016 at the Carriageworks, Sydney. The host for the ceremony was Brian Nankervis, adjudicator on SBS-TV's RocKwiz.

The Art Music Awards were distributed on 16 August at the Plaza Ballroom, Melbourne and presented by APRA and the Australian Music Centre (AMC), "to recognise achievement in the composition, performance, education and presentation of Australian art music. Art music covers activity across contemporary classical music, contemporary jazz and improvised music, experimental music and sound art."

The Screen Music Awards were issued on 8 November by APRA, AMCOS and Australian Guild of Screen Composers (AGSC), which "acknowledges excellence and innovation in the genre of screen composition" and the ceremony was held at the City Recital Hall in Sydney.

On 15 March nominations for the APRA Music Awards were announced on multiple news sources; Jarryd James and Sia received four each. At the ceremony total of 14 awards were presented, including a new category, Overseas Recognition Award. Cold Chisel members (Jimmy Barnes, Don Walker, Ian Moss, Phil Small and Steve Prestwich) were honoured by the Ted Albert Award for Outstanding Services to Australian Music. Songwriter of the Year was Courtney Barnett.

== Presenters ==
At the APRA Music Awards ceremony on 5 April 2016, aside from the host, Brian Nankervis, the presenters were Styalz Fuego, Fiona Bevan, Catherine Britt, Trey Campbell, Suze DeMarchi, Tim Rogers, Maegan Cottone, Adalita and Don Walker.

== Performances ==
The APRA Music Awards ceremony showcased performances by:

- Urthboy with Kira Puru and Bertie Blackman
- The Delta Riggs
- D.I.G with Ngaiire
- Gang of Youths and Montaigne
- San Cisco
- Guy Sebastian
- The Living End

== APRA Music Awards ==
=== Blues & Roots Work of the Year ===
Title and/or artist	Writer(s)	Publisher(s)	Result
"All Nations" – Blue King Brown	Natalie Chilcote, Carlo Santone	—N/a	Nominated
"Days of Gold" – Busby Marou	Thomas Busby, Phil Barton, Lindsay Rimes	Sony/ATV Music Publishing Australia / Warner/Chappell Music Australia obo (on behalf of) Better Boat Music and Warner-Tamerlane Publishing Corp.	Won
"Come People" – Xavier Rudd	Xavier Rudd	Sony/ATV Music Publishing Australia P/L	Nominated
"Easy" – The Bamboos featuring Tim Rogers	Lance Ferguson, Tim Rogers	Universal Music Publishing / ABC Music Publishing	Nominated
"No One" – Ben Wright-Smith	Ben Wright-Smith, Oscar Dawson	Native Tongue Music Publishing	Nominated

=== Breakthrough Songwriter of the Year ===
Title and/or artist	Writer(s)	Publisher(s)	Result
Gang of Youths	David Le'aupepe	Universal Music Publishing Australia	Nominated
Alex Hope	Alex Hope	Sony/ATV Music Publishing Australia	Won
Jarryd James	Jarryd James	Sony/ATV Music Publishing Australia	Nominated
Marlon Williams	Marlon Williams	Native Tongue Music Publishing	Nominated
Troye Sivan	Troye Sivan Mellet	—N/a	Nominated

=== Country Work of the Year ===
Title and/or artist	Writer(s)	Publisher(s)	Result
"I Will Always Be with You" – Lee Kernaghan	Lee Kernaghan, Colin Buchanan, Garth Porter	Universal Music Publishing / Perfect Pitch Publishing	Nominated
"Is God Real" – Kasey Chambers	Kasey Chambers	Mushroom Music	Nominated
"Secondhand Man" – Shane Nicholson	Shane Nicholson	Mushroom Music	Nominated
"Spirit of the ANZACs" – Lee Kernaghan	Lee Kernaghan, Colin Buchanan, Garth Porter	Universal Music Publishing / Perfect Pitch Publishing	Won
"Wrap Me in a Fever" – Ruby Boots	Rebecca Chilcott	ABC Music Publishing	Nominated

=== Dance Work of the Year ===
Title and/or artist	Writer(s)	Publisher(s)	Result
"Do It Now" – Mashd N Kutcher	James Finn, Daniel McNamee, Daniel Williams, Adam Morris, Matthew Ough	Kobalt Music Publishing Australia obo Art Vs Science	Nominated
"Maybe" – Carmada	Max Armata, Drew Carmody	—N/a	Nominated
"Something About You" – Hayden James	Hayden James, Alexander Burnett, George Maple	Kobalt Music Publishing Australia obo Future Classic Publishing / Mushroom Music obo Ivy League Music	Nominated
"Take Me Over" – Peking Duk featuring Safia	Kaelyn Behr, Mikah Freeman, Vance Musgrove, Amanda Ghost	Sony/ATV Music Publishing (Australia) Pty Ltd, Universal Music Publishing Pty Ltd	Won
"The Weekend" – Generik featuring Nicky Van She	Tyson O'Brien, Nicholas Routledge	—N/a	Nominated
"You Were Right" – RÜFÜS	Jonathon George, James Hunt, Tyrone Lindqvist	Kobalt Music Publishing Australia obo Sweat It Out	Nominated

=== International Work of the Year ===
Title and/or artist	Writer(s)	Publisher(s)	Result
"Blank Space" – Taylor Swift	Taylor Swift, Martin Sandberg, Johan Schuster	Sony/ATV Music Publishing Australia obo Taylor Swift Music / Kobalt Music Publishing Australia obo MXM Music AB	Nominated
"Cheerleader" – Omi	Mark Bradford, Clifton Dillon, Ryan Dillon, Sly Dunbar, Omar Pasley	Universal Music Publishing obo Ultra Music Publishing Europe	Nominated
"Style" – Taylor Swift	Taylor Swift, Johan Schuster, Martin Sandberg, Ali Payami	Sony/ATV Music Publishing Australia obo Taylor Swift Music / Kobalt Music Publishing Australia obo MXM Music AB / Warner/Chappell Music Australia obo Wolf Cousins	Nominated
"Sugar" – Maroon 5	Joshua Coleman, Lukasz Gottwald, Jacob Hindlin, Adam Levine, Michael Posner, Henry Walter	Kobalt Music Publishing Australia obo Each Note Counts / Kobalt Music Publishing Australia obo Kasz Money Publishing / Kobalt Music Publishing Australia obo Kobalt Music Copyrights SARL and Prescription Songs / Universal/MCA Music Publishing obo Sudgee 2 Music / Sony/ATV Music Publishing Australia obo North Greenway Productions / Kobalt Music Publishing Australia obo Prescription Songs and Cirkut Breaker	Nominated
"UpTown Funk!" – Mark Ronson featuring Bruno Mars	Jeffrey Bhasker, Devon Gallaspy, Philip Lawrence, Bruno Mars, Mark Ronson, Lonnie Simmons, Rudy Taylor, Nicholaus Williams, Charlie Wilson, Robert Wilson, Ronnie Wilson	ony/ATV Music Publishing Australia obo Way Above Music / Sony/ATV Music Publishing Australia obo Sony/ATV Ballad / Universal/MCA Music Publishing obo ZZR Music LLC / Warner/Chappell Music Australia obo Mars Force Music, Thou Art The Hunger and BMG Gold Songs / Native Tongue Music Publishing obo Songs Of Zelig / Minder Music Australia obo New Songs Administration Limited / Native Tongue Music Publishing obo Trinlanta Publishing and Tig7 Publishing LLC	Won

=== Most Played Australian Work ===
Title and/or artist	Writer(s)	Publisher(s)	Result
"Do You Remember" – Jarryd James	Jarryd James, Joel Little	Sony/ATV Music Publishing Australia	Nominated
"Elastic Heart" – Sia	Sia Furler, Thomas Pentz, Andrew Swanson	Sony/ATV Music Publishing Australia / Native Tongue Music Publishing Australia obo I Like Turtles Music / Kobalt Music Publishing Australia obo Andrew Swanson Music	Nominated
"Flashlight" – Jessie J	Sia Furler, Christian Guzman, Jason Moore, Samuel Smith	Sony/ATV Music Publishing Australia / Universal/MCA Music Publishing obo UPG Music Publishing/ Sony/ATV Music Publishing Australia obo Stellar Songs and Sony/ATV Music Publishing Australia obo Naughty Words and Universal/MCA Music Publishing obo UPG Music Publishing	Nominated
"Georgia" – Vance Joy	Vance Joy	Mushroom Music obo WAU Publishing	Nominated
"Take Me Over" – Peking Duk featuring Safia	Adam Hyde, Reuben Styles, Styalz Fuego, Ben Woolner	Universal Music Publishing/ Sony/ATV Music Publishing Australia	Won

=== Most Played Australia Work Overseas ===
Title and/or artist	Writer(s)	Publisher(s)	Result
"Chandelier" – Sia	Sia Furler, Jesse Shatkin	Sony/ATV Music Publishing Australia	Won

=== Overseas Recognition Award ===
Writer(s)	Publisher(s)	Result
Phil Barton	Warner/Chappell Music Australia obo Better Boat Music and Warner-Tamerlane Publishing Corp.	Won
Josef Salvat	Sony/ATV Music Publishing Australia obo Sony ATV Music Publishing (UK)	Nominated
Kylie Sackley	—N/a	Nominated
Sam Dixon	Mushroom Music obo BMG Chrysalis	Nominated
Vassy	—N/a	Nominated

=== Pop Work of the Year ===
Title and/or artist	Writer(s)	Publisher(s)	Result
"Do You Remember" – Jarryd James	Jarryd James, Joel Little	Sony/ATV Music Publishing Australia	Won
"Elastic Heart" – Sia	Sia Furler, Thomas Pentz, Andrew Swanson	Sony/ATV Music Publishing Australia / Native Tongue Music Publishing Australia obo I Like Turtles Music / Kobalt Music Publishing Australia obo Andrew Swanson Music	Nominated
"Flashlight" – Jessie J	Sia Furler, Christian Guzman, Jason Moore, Samuel Smith	Sony/ATV Music Publishing Australia / Universal/MCA Music Publishing obo UPG Music Publishing/ Sony/ATV Music Publishing Australia obo Stellar Songs and Sony/ATV Music Publishing Australia obo Naughty Words and Universal/MCA Music Publishing obo UPG Music Publishing	Nominated
"Georgia" – Vance Joy	Vance Joy	Mushroom Music obo WAU Publishing	Nominated
"If You Love Someone" – The Veronicas	Jessica Origliasso, Lisa Origliasso, Anthony Egizii, David Musumeci, Joshua Katz	Universal Music Publishing / Sony/ATV Music Publishing Australia / Universal Music Publishing obo The Kennel AB	Nominated

=== Rock Work of the Year ===
Title and/or artist	Writer(s)	Publisher(s)	Result
Anchor – Birds of Tokyo	Ian Berney, Ian Kenny, Glenn Sarangapany, Adam Spark, Adam Weston	Mushroom Music	Won
"Hoops" – The Rubens	Scott Baldwin, Elliott Margin, Izaac Margin, Samuel Margin, William Zeglis	Mushroom Music obo Ivy League Music	Nominated
"Micro Wars" – Kingswood	Alexander Laska	Native Tongue Music Publishing	Nominated
"Play Ball" – AC/DC	Angus Young, Malcolm Young	J Albert and Son	Nominated
"Rock or Bust" – AC/DC	Angus Young, Malcolm Young	J Albert and Son	Nominated

=== Song of the Year ===
Title and/or artist	Writer(s)	Publisher(s)	Result
"Anchor" – Birds of Tokyo	Ian Berney, Ian Kenny, Glenn Sarangapany, Adam Spark, Adam Weston	Mushroom Music	Nominated
"Do You Remember" – Jarryd James	Jarryd James, Joel Little	Sony/ATV Music Publishing Australia	Nominated
"Let It Happen" – Tame Impala	Kevin Parker	Sony/ATV Music Publishing Australia	Won
"Pedestrian at Best" – Courtney Barnett	Courtney Barnett	Native Tongue Music Publishing	Nominated
"The Zombie" – C. W. Stoneking	C. W. Stoneking	—N/a	Nominated

=== Songwriter of the Year ===
- Courtney Barnett

=== Ted Albert Award for Outstanding Services to Australian Music ===
- Cold Chisel (Jimmy Barnes, Don Walker, Ian Moss, Phil Small, Steve Prestwich)

=== Urban Work of the Year ===
Title and/or artist	Writer(s)	Publisher(s)	Result
"Cosby Sweater" – Hilltop Hoods	DJ Debris (Barry Francis), MC Pressure (Daniel Smith), Suffa (Matthew Lambert), Demitris Christopoulos, John Kelman	Sony/ATV Music Publishing Australia / J Albert and Son obo Cherry Red Songs	Won
"Live and Let Go" – Hilltop Hoods	DJ Debris (Barry Francis), MC Pressure (Daniel Smith), Suffa (Matthew Lambert), Andrew Burford, Ali Newman, Michael Stafford	Sony/ATV Music Publishing Australia / Universal Music Publishing / Sony/ATV Music Publishing Australia obo Sony/ATV Music Publishing (UK)	Nominated
"M.O.B." – Tkay Maidza	Tkay Maidza, Luke McKay	Kobalt Music Publishing Australia	Nominated
"Switch Lanes" – Tkay Maidza	Tkay Maidza, Michael Perry	Kobalt Music Publishing Australia / Native Tongue Music Publishing obo Boss Level	Nominated
"The Buzz" – Hermitude featuring Mataya and Young Tapz	Luke Dubber, Angus Stuart, Tim Levinson	Sony/ATV Music Publishing Australia / J Albert and Son	Nominated

== Art Music Awards ==
=== Instrumental Work of the Year ===
Title	Composer	Performer	Result
Patañjali	Michael Kieran Harvey	Michael Kieran Harvey, Arabella Teniswood-Harvey, Eugene Ughetii, Arjun von Caemmerer (yoga asana)	Nominated
read/write error	Tristan Coelho	Ensemble Offspring	Nominated
Saudade	Natalie Williams	Doric String Quartet, Pavel Haas Quartet	Nominated
Semaphore	Kate Neal	Semaphore band and dancers	Won

=== Jazz Work of the Year ===
Title	Composer	Performer	Result
Beginning and End of Knowing	Laurence Pike, Mike Nock	Laurence Pike, Mike Nock	Nominated
Nyilipidgi	Paul Grabowsky, Young Wägilak Group	Paul Grabowsky, the Young Wägilak Group and the Monash Art Ensemble	Won
Spiel	Paul Grabowsky, Niko Schäuble	Paul Grabowsky, Niko Schäuble	Nominated
Water Pushes Sand	Erik Griswold	Erik Griswold, Vanessa Tomlinson, Australian Art Orchestra and Sichuan musicians	Nominated

=== Orchestral Work of the Year ===
Title	Composer	Performer	Result
Darkest Light	Mary Finsterer	Monash Academy Orchestra	Nominated
Earth Plays	Catherine Milliken	Bavarian Radio Orchestra, Fiona Campbell (soloist) Peter Rundel (conductor)	Won
From Joyous Leaves	Elliott Gyger	Arcko Symphonic Ensemble, Zubin Kanga (soloist), Timothy Phillips (conductor)	Nominated
Jerusalem (after Blake)	Georges Lentz	Sydney Symphony Orchestra, David Robertson (conductor)	Nominated

=== Vocal / Choral Work of the Year ===
Title	Composer / librettist	Performer	Result
Fly Away Peter	Elliott Gyger / Pierce Wilcox, after the novel by David Malouf	Sydney Chamber Opera	Nominated
Le Molière Imaginaire for eight voices	Andrew Schultz / Timothy Knapman, after the final scene of Molière's Le Malade Imaginaire	I Fagiolini	Won
Malala	Paul Jarman	PLC Sydney Chamber Choir and soloists	Nominated
Paradise, five songs for soprano, cello and piano	Andrew Schultz	Felicitas Fuchs (soprano), Qin Li-Wei (cello), Bernard Lanskey (piano)	Nominated

=== Performance of the Year ===
Title	Composer / librettist	Performer	Result
"Electroacoustic Music for One Percussionist"	Warren Burt, James Hullick, Stuart James, Andrián Pertout, Lindsay Vickery	Louise Devenish	Nominated
Fly Away Peter	Elliott Gyger	Sydney Chamber Opera	Nominated
Semaphore	Kate Neal	Semaphore band and dancers	Won
"String Quartet no. 3"	Paul Stanhope	Goldner String Quartet	Nominated

=== Award for Excellence by an Individual ===
Individual	Work	Result
Andrée Greenwell	Composer and Artistic Director of Green Room Music	Nominated
Claire Edwardes	Performance, advocacy and artistic leadership	Won
Peter Knight	Sustained contribution through composition, performance and leadership	Nominated
Ros Dunlop	Sustained contribution to Australian music for over 30 years	Nominated

=== Award for Excellence by an Organisation ===
Organisation	Work	Result
Arcko Symphonic Ensemble	Presenting From Sorrowing Earth, a celebration of Nigel Butterley	Nominated
Ensemble Offspring	2015 activities and sustained services to Australian music for 20 years	Won
Speak Percussion	2015 Program: performance, commissions, collaborations and education	Nominated
The Music Show (ABC Radio National)	Promotion, discussion and analysis of Australian music over 25 years	Nominated

=== Award for Excellence in Music Education ===
Organisation / individual	Work	Result
Artology	Fanfare Competition	Won
Australian Art Orchestra	Creative Music Intensive residency project	Nominated
Queensland Music Festival	Cape York Instrumental Program	Nominated
SCEGGS Darlinghurst	Compose 120 Projects	Nominated

=== Award for Excellence in a Regional Area ===
Organisation / individual	Work	Result
Moorambilla Voices	Moorambilla Voices 2015 Tenth Anniversary Season	Won
Queensland Music Festival	Under This Sky, a large scale production in the community of Logan	Nominated
TURA New Music	2015 Reflection Tour to regional, remote and very remote Australia	Nominated
Tyalgum Music Festival	2015 Tyalgum Music Festival	Nominated

=== Award for Excellence in Experimental Music ===
Organisation / individual	Work	Result
Clan Analogue	Intone: Voice Abstractions	Nominated
Decibel	After Julia program	Nominated
Leah Barclay	WIRA River Listening	Nominated
Speak Percussion	2015 Music Program	Won

=== Award for Excellence in Jazz ===
Organisation / individual	Work	Result
Alister Spence Trio	Alister Spence Trio: Live	Nominated
Australian Jazz Real Book	Australian Jazz Real Book	Won
Mark Isaacs	Sustained contribution over four decades and 2015 Queensland Regional Tour	Nominated
WA Youth Jazz Orchestra	Outstanding 2015 annual program	Nominated

=== Distinguished Services to Australian Music ===
Organisation / individual	Result
Helen Gifford	Won

== Screen Music Awards ==
=== Feature Film Score of the Year ===
Title	Composer	Result
99 Homes	Antony Partos, Matteo Zingales	Won
Crew Cut	Timothy Cheel, Christopher Larkin	Nominated
Oddball	Cezary Skubiszewski	Nominated
The Dressmaker	David Hirschfelder	Nominated

=== Best Music for an Advertisement ===
Title	Composer	Result
2016 AICP Opening	Jeremy Yang	Won
Cadbury Marvellous Creations	Rafael May	Nominated
Country Racing Victoria: – "It's Got it All"	Robert Upward	Nominated
Rio 2016 Olympics	Sarah Aarons, Anthony Egizii, David Musumeci, Graham Donald	Nominated

=== Best Music for Children's Television ===
Title	Composer	Result
Bottersnikes and Gumbles: "Up, Up and Away"	Michael Szumowski	Nominated
Mako: Island of Secrets: "Homecoming"	Ricky Edwards, Brett Aplin	Nominated
The New Adventures of Figaro Pho: "Odd Socks"	Michael Darren, Luke Jurevicius, Christopher Larkin	Won
Transformers: Rescue Bots: "The Last of Morocco"	Christopher Elves	Nominated

=== Best Music for a Documentary ===
Title	Composer	Result
Getting Frank Gehry	Caitlin Yeo	Won
Neon	Antony Partos	Nominated
Putuparri and the Rainmakers	David Bridie	Nominated
The Will to Fly	Tom Rouch	Nominated

=== Best Music for a Mini-Series or Telemovie ===
Title	Composer	Result
The Beautiful Lie	Alan John	Won
DNA Nation	Matteo Zingales	Nominated
Peter Allen: Not the Boy Next Door	Michael Yezerski, Ashley Irwin	Nominated
Secret City	David Bridie	Nominated

=== Best Music for a Short Film ===
Title	Composer	Result
Banana Boy	Adam Moses	Won
Daisy Chain	Hylton Mowday	Nominated
Letting Blood	Nicholas Robert Thayer	Nominated
Ravens	Michael Yezerski, Helen Grimley (additional music)	Nominated

=== Best Music for a Television Series or Serial ===
Series or Serial	Episode title	Composer	Result
Glitch	"There Is No Justice"	Cornel Wilczek	Nominated
Janet King	"The Invisible Wound"	Antony Partos	Nominated
The Principal	—N/a	Roger Mason	Won
Wanted	"Series 1 Episode 6"	Michael Yezerski	Nominated

=== Best Original Song Composed for the Screen ===
Song title	Work	Composer	Result
"Dancing in the Darkness"	The Letdown	Darren Seltmann, Sally Seltmann	Won
"Maurice's Big Adventure"	Big Adventure	Sean Peter	Nominated
"Those Friends of Mine"	Pawno	Tristan Dewey, Tai Jordan, Mark Pearl	Nominated
"When You Were on the Run"	No Activity	Cameron Bruce	Nominated

=== Best Soundtrack Album ===
Title	Composer	Result
All About E	Basil Hogios	Nominated
Only the Dead	Michael Yezerski	Nominated
Sherpa	Antony Partos	Won
The Dressmaker	David Hirschfelder	Nominated

=== Best Television Theme ===
Title	Composer	Result
Compass	Caitlin Yeo	Nominated
Here Come the Habibs	Kyls Burtland	Nominated
Nos Youm	Peter Cavallo	Won
Tomorrow When the War Began	Cameron Giles-Webb, Colin Simkins	Nominated

=== Most Performed Screen Composer – Australia ===
Composer	Result
Adam Gock, Dinesh Wicks	Nominated
Jay Stewart	Won
Neil Sutherland	Nominated
Nick Perjanik	Nominated

=== Most Performed Screen Composer – Overseas ===
Composer	Result
Adam Gock, Dinesh Wicks	Nominated
Alastair Ford	Nominated
Neil Sutherland	Won
Ricky Edwards	Nominated
