= APRA Music Awards of 2021 =

39th annual Australian music award ceremony

- Date: 28 April 2021
- Location: International Convention Centre Grand Ballroom, Sydney, Australia
- Hosted by: Julia Zemiro; Ziggy Ramo; Georgia Moone

Highlights
- Most wins: Tones and I (2)
- Website: apraamcos.com.au/awards/

The APRA Music Awards of 2021 are the 39th annual series, known as APRA Awards. The awards are given in a series of categories in three divisions and in separate ceremonies throughout the year: the APRA Music Awards, Art Music Awards and Screen Music Awards. The APRA Music Awards are provided by APRA AMCOS; nominations were revealed on 30 March 2021, and the ceremony followed on 28 April 2021. The Art Music Awards are jointly presented by APRA AMCOS and the Australian Music Centre (AMC). The finalists were announced in July with the winners revealed on 9 September. The Screen Music Awards are jointly provided by APRA and the Australian Guild of Screen Composers (AGSC) with the ceremony usually held in November, however, it was postponed to 22 February 2022.

CEO of APRA AMCOS Dean Ormston announced the 2021 awards, "As Australia slowly begins recovering from the coronavirus pandemic, our industry is still largely on pause. After such a difficult year, our sincere hope is that we can stage a traditional live ceremony for the 2021 APRA Music Awards. A physical event would announce that we're in a new era, one where we can celebrate the Australian songwriters that have excelled despite one of the most challenging years in memory. We hope to see you there in the flesh."

== APRA Music Awards ==
=== Ted Albert Award for Outstanding Services to Australian Music ===
- Helen Reddy
- Joy McKean

=== APRA Song of the Year ===
Title and/or artist	Writer(s)	Publisher(s)	Result	Ref.
"Carry You" by Missy Higgins	Tim Minchin	Kobalt Music Publishing	Nominated	
"Everybody Rise" by Amy Shark	Amy Shark, Joel Little	Mushroom Music, Sony Music Publishing	Nominated	
"Gadigal Land" by Midnight Oil featuring Dan Sultan, Joel Davison, Kaleena Briggs, Bunna Lawrie	Joel Davison, Rob Hirst, Bunna Lawrie	Sony Music Publishing, Universal Music Publishing	Won	
"Lost in Yesterday" by Tame Impala	Kevin Parker	Sony Music Publishing	Nominated	
"Standing with You" by Guy Sebastian	Guy Sebastian, Jamie Hartman, Greg Holden	Universal Music Publishing, Mushroom Music o.b.o. Reservoir, Warner Chappell Music	Nominated	

=== Breakthrough Songwriter of the Year ===
Writer(s)	Publisher(s)	Result	Ref.
Charlton Howard p.k.a. the Kid Laroi	Sony Music Publishing	Won	
Grace Shaw p.k.a. Mallrat	Kobalt Music Publishing o.b.o. Dew Process	Nominated	
Miiesha Young p.k.a. Miiesha	Sony Music Publishing	Nominated	
Louis Leimback, Oli Leimback (of Lime Cordiale)	Universal Music Publishing o.b.o. Chugg Music	Nominated	
Thelma Plum	Sony Music Publishing	Nominated	

- Note: Determined by the APRA Board of Writer and Publisher Directors

=== Songwriter of the Year ===
Writer(s)	Publisher(s)	Result	Ref.
Kevin Parker	Sony Music Publishing	Won	

- Note: Determined by the APRA Board of Writer and Publisher Directors

=== Most Performed Alternative Work ===
Title and/or artist	Writer(s)	Publisher(s)	Result	Ref.
"Live in Life" by the Rubens	Scott Baldwin, Elliott Margin, Sam Margin, Zaac Margin, William Zeglis	Mushroom Music o.b.o. Ivy League Music	Won	
"Lost in Yesterday" by Tame Impala	Kevin Parker	Sony Music Publishing	Nominated	
"Robbery" by Lime Cordiale	Louis Leimbach, Oli Leimbach, Shane Abrahams, Daniel Choder, Jonathan Pakfar	Universal Music Publishing o.b.o. Chugg Music, Downtown Music, Kobalt Music Publishing	Nominated	
"Silver" by DMA's	Matt Mason, Tommy O'Dell, Johnny Took, Thomas Crandles, Joel Flyger, Liam Hoskins	Mushroom Music, Sony Music Publishing	Nominated	
"Two of Us" by Birds of Tokyo	Ian Berney, Ian Kenny, Glenn Sarangapany, Adam Spark, Adam Weston	Mushroom Music	Nominated	

=== Most Performed Australian Work ===
Title and/or artist	Writer(s)	Publisher(s)	Result	Ref.
"Break My Heart" by Dua Lipa	Andrew Farriss, Michael Hutchence, Dua Lipa, Jordan Johnson, Stefan Johnson, Ali Tamposi, Andrew Watt	Warner Chappell Music, Universal Music Publishing, BMG Rights Management, Mushroom Music o.b.o. Reservoir, Kobalt Music Publishing	Nominated	
"Live in Life" by the Rubens	Scott Baldwin, Elliott Margin, Sam Margin, Zaac Margin, William Zeglis	Mushroom Music o.b.o. Ivy League Music	Nominated	
"Never Seen the Rain" by Tones and I	Toni Watson	Kobalt Music Publishing	Won	
"Rushing Back" by Flume featuring Vera Blue	Harley Streten, Celia Pavey, Eric Dubowsky, Sophie Cates	Kobalt Music Publishing o.b.o. Future Classic, Universal Music Publishing, Kobalt Music Publishing	Nominated	
"Used to Love" by Martin Garrix and Dean Lewis	Dean Lewis, Martijn Garritsen, Kristoffer Fogelmark, Albin Nedler	Kobalt Music Publishing, Universal Music Publishing	Nominated	

=== Most Performed Australian Work Overseas ===
Writer(s)	Publisher(s)	Result	Ref.
"Be Alright" by Dean Lewis (Dean Lewis / Jon Hume)	Kobalt Music Publishing o.b.o. Specific Music / Sony Music Publishing	Won	

=== Most Performed Blues & Roots Work ===
Title and/or artist	Writer(s)	Publisher(s)	Result	Ref.
"Ain't My Problem" by Ash Grunwald featuring the Teskey Brothers	Ash Grunwald	Mushroom Music	Nominated	
"Give Me Money" by Dope Lemon	Angus Stone	Sony Music Publishing	Nominated	
"Over Drinking Over You" by Busby Marou	Thomas Busby, Jeremy Marou, Ivy Adara, Jon Hume, Lindsey Jackson	Sony Music Publishing, Kobalt Music Publishing, Native Tongue Music Publishing	Won	
"Pretty Lady" by Tash Sultana	Tash Sultana, Matt Corby, Dann Hume	Kobalt Music Publishing o.b.o. Tash Sultana, Sony Music Publishing	Nominated	
"Together" by Ziggy Alberts	Ziggy Alberts	Kobalt Music Publishing o.b.o. Alberts & Co Music	Nominated	

=== Most Performed Country Work ===
Title and/or artist	Writer(s)	Publisher(s)	Result	Ref.
"A Little More" by Casey Barnes	Casey Barnes, Michael Delorenzis, Michael Paynter	Mushroom Music	Nominated	
"Diamonds" by Morgan Evans	Morgan Evans, Evan Bogart, Chris de Stefano	Warner Chappell Music, Kobalt Music Publishing, Sony Music Publishing	Won	
"Give Me Tonight" by Brad Cox	Brad Cox, Joseph Mungovan	Sony Music Publishing	Nominated	
"I Got This" by the McClymonts	Brooke McClymont, Mollie McClymont, Samantha McClymont, Andy Mak	Sony Music Publishing, Native Tongue Music Publishing	Nominated	
"Memphis T-shirt" by Melanie Dyer	Melanie Dyer, Emily Doty, Karen Kosowski	Sony Music Publishing	Nominated	

=== Most Performed Dance Work ===
Title and/or artist	Writer(s)	Publisher(s)	Result	Ref.
"All of Us" by Pnau featuring Ollie Gabriel	Nick Littlemore, Sam Littlemore, Peter Mayes, Oli Gabriel	Universal Music Publishing	Nominated	
"Head & Heart" by Joel Corry & MNEK	Jonathan Courtidis, Neav Applebaum, Joel Corry, Daniel Dare, Robert Harvey, MNEK, Kasif Siddiqui, Lewis Thompson	Sony Music Publishing, Universal Music Publishing, Mushroom Music o.b.o. Minds on Fire, Warner Chappell Music, Kobalt Music Publishing	Nominated	
"Rushing Back" by Flume featuring Vera Blue	Harley Streten, Celia Pavey, Eric Dubowsky, Sophie Cates	Kobalt Music Publishing o.b.o. Future Classic, Universal Music Publishing, Kobalt Music Publishing	Won	
"San Frandisco" by Dom Dolla	Dominic Matheson	Sweat It Out Publishing administered by Kobalt Music Publishing	Nominated	
"Used to Love" by Martin Garrix and Dean Lewis	Dean Lewis, Martijn Garritsen, Kristoffer Fogelmark, Albin Nedler	Kobalt Music Publishing, Universal Music Publishing	Nominated	

=== Most Performed Hip Hop / Rap Work ===
Title and/or artist	Writer(s)	Publisher(s)	Result	Ref.
"Boss" by Day1	Bailey Rawiri, Tuhi Montell	—N/a	Nominated	
"German" by No Money Enterprise	Junior Leaupepe	—N/a	Nominated	
"I'm Good" by Hilltop Hoods	Barry Francis (DJ Debris), Matthew Lambert (Suffa), Daniel Smith (Pressure), Paul Bartlett, John Bartlett	Sony Music Publishing	Nominated	
"In the Beginning" by Onefour	Spencer Magalogo, Jerome Misa, Pio Misa, Salec Su'a	Sony Music Publishing	Nominated	
"Misunderstood" by Youngn Lipz	Filipo Faaoloii	—N/a	Won	

=== Most Performed International Work ===
Title and/or artist	Writer(s)	Publisher(s)	Result	Ref.
"Adore You" by Harry Styles	Harry Styles, Amy Allen, Thomas Hull, Tyler Johnson	Universal Music Publishing, Kobalt Music Publishing, Native Tongue Music Publishing	Nominated	
"Before You Go" by Lewis Capaldi	Lewis Capaldi, Thomas Barnes, Peter Kelleher, Benjamin Kohn, Philip Plested	BMG Rights Management, Sony Music Publishing	Nominated	
"Blinding Lights" by the Weeknd	Abel Tesfaye, Ahmad Balshe, Oscar Holter, Max Martin, Jason Quenneville	Kobalt Music Publishing, Warner Chappell Music, Universal/MCA Music Publishing	Nominated	
"Don't Start Now" by Dua Lipa	Dua Lipa, Caroline Ailin, Ian Kirkpatrick, Emily Schwartz	Universal Music Publishing, BMG Rights Management, Warner Chappell Music, Kobalt Music Publishing	Won	
"Memories" by Maroon 5	Adam Levine, Jonathan Bellion, Vincent Ford, Jacob Hindlin, Jordan Johnson, Stefan Johnson, Michael Pollack	Universal/MCA Music Publishing, BMG Rights Management, Kobalt Music Publishing, Warner Chappell Music	Nominated	

=== Most Performed Pop Work ===
Title and/or artist	Writer(s)	Publisher(s)	Result	Ref.
"Break My Heart" by Dua Lipa	Andrew Farriss, Michael Hutchence, Dua Lipa, Jordan Johnson, Stefan Johnson, Ali Tamposi, Andrew Watt	Warner Chappell Music, Universal Music Publishing, BMG Rights Management, Mushroom Music o.b.o. Reservoir, Kobalt Music Publishing	Nominated	
"Everybody Rise" by Amy Shark	Amy Shark, Joel Little	Mushroom Music, Sony Music Publishing	Nominated	
"Let Me Drink" by Guy Sebastian	Guy Sebastian, M-Phazes, Olubowale Akintimehin	Universal Music Publishing, Warner Chappell Music	Nominated	
"Never Seen the Rain" by Tones and I	Toni Watson	Kobalt Music Publishing	Won	
"Selfish" by Jessica Mauboy	Jessica Mauboy, Antonio Egizii, Isabella Kearney-Nurse, David Musumeci	Universal Music Publishing, Sony Music Publishing	Nominated	

=== Most Performed R&B / Soul Work ===
Title and/or artist	Writer(s)	Publisher(s)	Result	Ref.
"2560" by Becca Hatch	Becca Hatch, Maribelle, Jamie Muscat, Willie Tafa, Solo Tohi	Sony Music Publishing, Universal Music Publishing	Nominated	
"NobodyLikeYou" by Winston Surfshirt	Jack Hambling, Lachlan McAllister, Brett Ramson	BMG Rights Management	Nominated	
"Rain" by the Teskey Brothers		Mushroom Music o.b.o. Ivy League Music	Won	
"Say to Me" by Milan Ring	Milan Ring, Blessed Joe-Andah	Universal Music Publishing, BMG Rights Management	Nominated	
"Twisting Words" by Miiesha	Miiesha Young, Stephen Collins, Mohamed Komba	Sony Music Publishing, Mushroom Music	Nominated	

=== Most Performed Rock Work ===
Title and/or artist	Writer(s)	Publisher(s)	Result	Ref.
"Chase the Feeling" by Wolfmother featuring Chris Cester	Andrew Stockdale, Chris Cester, Jason Hill	BMG Rights Management, Universal/MCA Music Publishing	Nominated	
"Getting the Band Back Together" by Cold Chisel	Don Walker	Sony Music Publishing	Won	
"Good for You" by Spacey Jane	Ashton Hardman-Le Cornu, Caleb Harper, Kieran Lama, Peppa Lane	Kobalt Music Publishing o.b.o. Dew Process	Nominated	
"I Missed Out" by Hockey Dad	Will Fleming, Zach Stephenson	BMG Rights Management	Nominated	
"Soak Me in Bleach" by the Amity Affliction	Joel Birch, Daniel Brown, Joseph Longobardi, Ahren Stringer	Kobalt Music Publishing, Native Tongue Music Publishing	Nominated	

== Art Music Awards ==
=== Work of the Year: Chamber Music ===
Title	Composer / librettist	Performer	Result	Ref.
A Room of Her Own	Anne Cawrse	Australian String Quartet	Won	
Canyon 1205	Kate Neal, Grischa Lichtenberger	Blair Harris (cello)	Nominated	
Clarinet Quartet	Gordon Kerry	Omega Ensemble	Nominated	
Hidden Thoughts II: Return to Sender	Katy Abbott / compiled by Katy Abbott and Maureen Johnson, based on letters sent by Australians to asylum seekers in detention	Flinders Quartet, Dimity Shepherd (mezzo-soprano), Richard Piper (narrator)	Nominated	

=== Work of the Year: Choral ===
Title	Composer / librettist	Performer	Result	Ref.
Beannacht an Long (Blest Be the Boat)	Clare Maclean / traditional	Voyces	Nominated	
Sacred Stones	Lisa Young / Lisa Young (text)	Massed choir, Gondwana National Choral School 2020, Lisa Young (conductor)	Won	
Singing in Tune with Nature	Amanda Cole	N.E.O. Voice Festival artists	Nominated	
Until We Gather Again	Alice Chance / Alice Chance	Leichhardt Espresso Chorus, Michelle Leonard (artistic director)	Nominated	

=== Work of the Year: Dramatic ===
Title	Composer / librettist	Performer	Result	Ref.
Commute	Peggy Polias / Pierce Wilcox	Sydney Chamber Opera, Jessica O'Donoghue, Jack Symonds (conductor), and Clemence Williams (director)	Nominated	
Dragon Ladies Don't Weep	Erik Griswold	Margaret Leng Tan (performer), Tamara Saulwick (director), Nick Roux (video artist), Kok Heng Leun (dramaturg)	Won	
Her Dark Marauder	Georgia Scott / Pierce Wilcox	Sydney Chamber Opera, Jane Sheldon, Jessica O'Donoghue, Simon Lobelson, Jack Symonds (conductor), Danielle Maas (director)	Nominated	
The Tent	Josephine Macken / Josephine Macken	Sydney Chamber Opera, Simon Lobelson, Mitchell Riley, Jane Sheldon, Jack Symonds (conductor), Danielle Maas (director)	Nominated	

=== Work of the Year: Electroacustic/Sound Art ===
Title	Composer	Performer	Result	Ref.
An Improvisation Through Time and Space 穿越时光的即兴	Mindy Meng Wang	Mindy Meng Wang (guzheng)	Nominated	
Closed Beginnings	Tariro Mavondo, Reuben Lewis, Peter Knight	Tariro Mavondo (poetry), Reuben Lewis and Peter Knight (music), Jem Savage (sound production), Leo Dale (video production)	Won	
Fugue	Jane Sheldon / Dave Rattray	Jane Sheldon (soprano), Kirsty McCahon (double bass), Sydney Dance Company's Pre-Professional Year 2020 cohort; Omer Backley-Astrachan (choreography)	Nominated	
Oracle Chamber	Amanda Cole	Lamorna Nightingale (bass flute), James Nightingale (saxophone)	Nominated	

=== Work of the Year: Jazz ===
Title	Composer	Performer	Result	Ref.
Asteroid Ekosystem	Alister Spence, Lloyd Swanton, Toby Hall, Ed Kuepper	Alister Spence Trio, Ed Kuepper	Nominated	
Living	Paul Cutlan	Paul Cutlan String Project (Paul Cutlan, Liisa Pallandi, Caroline Hopson, James Eccles, Oliver Miller, Brett Hirst and Tunji Beier)	Nominated	
All Who Travel with Us	Loretta Palmeiro, Mark Isaacs	Loretta Palmeiro, Mark Isaacs	Nominated	
Spaccanapoli	Vanessa Perica	Vanessa Perica Orchestra	Won	

=== Work of the Year: Large Ensemble ===
Title	Composer	Performer	Result	Ref.
Kadosh Kadosh and Cursed	Yitzhak Yedid	Le Nouvel Ensemble Moderne (NEM), Lorraine Vaillancourt (conductor)	Nominated	
Piece 43 for Now	Cathy Milliken	SWR Symphonieorchester, Titus Engel (conductor)	Won	
Splinter	Holly Harrison	San Jose State University Wind Ensemble, David Vickerman (conductor)	Nominated	
When I Stand Before Thee at the Day's End	Cyrus Meurant	Kirsten Williams, Canberra Symphony Orchestra	Nominated	

=== Performance of the Year: Jazz / Improvised Music ===
Title	Composer	Performer	Result	Ref.
All Who Travel with Us	Loretta Palmeiro, Mark Isaacs	Loretta Palmeiro, Mark Isaacs	Nominated	
The Golden Seam	Phil Slater, Brett Hirst, Matthew Keegan, Matthew McMahon, Simon Barker	Phil Slater Quintet	Nominated	
Silent Towns	Jon Heilbron, Callum G'Froerer, Simon Charles, Brett Thompson, Jenny Barnes, Andy Butler, Rebecca Lane, Reuben Lewis, Joseph Houston, Michael McNab	Phonetic Orchestra	Won	
Sacred Key	Jeremy Rose, Hamed Sadeghi, Lloyd Swanton	Vazesh	Nominated	

=== Performance of the Year: Notated Composition ===
Title	Composer / librettist	Performer	Result	Ref.
Subdue	Jakob Bragg	Carl Rosman	Nominated	
The Harp and the Moon	Ross Edwards	Emily Granger	Nominated	
En Masse	Alex Pozniak	Ensemble Offspring	Nominated	
Commute	Peggy Polias / Pierce Wilcox	Sydney Chamber Opera, Jessica O'Donoghue, Jack Symonds (conductor), Clemence Williams (director)	Won	

=== Award for Excellence in Music Education ===
Organisation / individual	Work	Result	Ref.
Australian Art Orchestra	Creative Music Intensive 2020	Nominated	
Moorambilla Voices	Moorambilla Magic Modules	Won	
Musica Viva	Musica Viva in Schools Online	Nominated	
Speak Percussion	Sounds Unheard Education Program	Nominated	

=== Award for Excellence in Experimental Music ===
Organisation / individual	Work	Result	Ref.
Decibel New Music Ensemble	2 Minutes from Home	Nominated	
HiberNATION	Festival of the Lo-fi	Nominated	
Keyna Wilkins	Recording and developing new projects in 2020	Nominated	
Leah Barclay, Lyndon Davis, Tricia King	Listening in the Wild	Won	

=== Richard Gill Award for Distinguished Services to Australian Music ===
Organisation / individual	Result	Ref.
Penny Lomax, Maureen Cooney	Won	

=== Luminary Award: Individual (National) ===
Individual	Work	Result	Ref.
Deborah Kayser	30-year contribution to Australian music as a trail-blazing soprano	Won	

=== Luminary Award: Organisation (National) ===
Organisation	Work	Result	Ref.
Speak Percussion	Visionary leadership and sustained contribution to Australian art music	Won	

=== Luminary Award: State & Territory Awards ===
Organisation	Work	Result	Ref.
Ensemble Offspring (NSW)	for consistently high quality performances, breadth of repertoire, and commitment to collaboration for 25 years	Won	
Anne Cawrse (SA)	for sustained contribution to the new music culture of Adelaide through composition and education	Won	
Melbourne Digital Concert Hall (VIC)	for supporting the classical music industry during the COVID-19 crisis	Won	
Stephanie Eslake (TAS)	as founding editor of Cut Common, providing a voice to emerging composers and performers	Won	
Alex Raineri (QLD)	for commitment to the creation and performance of Australian contemporary music in the Brisbane Music Festival	Won	

== Screen Music Awards ==
=== Feature Film Score of the Year ===
Title	Composer	Result	Ref.
Bloody Hell	Brian Cachia	Won	
June Again	Christopher Gordon	Nominated	
Rams	Antony Partos	Nominated	
The Tax Collector	Michael Yezerski	Nominated	

=== Best Music for an Advertisement ===
Title	Composer	Result	Ref.
Australian Red Cross: "The Worst Block in Town"	Kate Miller-Heidke, Keir Nuttall	Nominated	
Save Our Sons: "Heartbeat"	Matteo Zingales	Nominated	
Suncorp Team Girls | "The Drive"	Scott Langley	Nominated	
"Untold Tale of Isabelle Simi"	Jonathan Dreyfus, Daniel Müller	Won	

=== Best Music for Children's Programming ===
Title	Composer	Result	Ref.
Bluey	Joff Bush	Won	
Daisy Quokka: World's Scariest Animal	Ack Kinmonth	Nominated	
Dive Club	Piers Burbrook de Vere, Angela Little	Nominated	
Space Nova: "Seaweed Samba"	Russell Thornton	Nominated	

=== Best Music for a Documentary ===
Title	Composer	Result	Ref.
Chef Antonio's Recipes for Revolution	Cezary Skubiszewski	Nominated	
Playing with Sharks: The Valerie Taylor Story	Caitlin Yeo	Won	
Quoll Farm	Maria Grenfell	Nominated	
The Magnitude of All Things	Rob Law	Nominated	

=== Best Music for a Mini-Series or Telemovie ===
Title	Composer	Result	Ref.
Exposed: The Ghost Train Fire	Anthony El-Ammar, Adam Gock, Mitch Stewart, Dinesh Wicks, Brontë Horder, David Huxtable, Richard LaBrooy, Rufio Sandilands, Alex Slater, Adam Sofo, Cassie To	Nominated	
Halifax: Retribution	Cezary Skubiszewski, Jan Skubiszewski	Nominated	
Hungry Ghosts	Roger Mason	Won	
The End	Antony Partos	Nominated	

=== Best Music for a Short Film ===
Title	Composer	Result	Ref.
Circumstance 2020	Fiona Hill	Nominated	
Elagabalus	Jorden Hays	Nominated	
Lifeblood	Jonathan Nix	Nominated	
Yellow Jack	Adam Moses	Won	

=== Best Music for a Television Series or Serial ===
Series or Serial	Composer	Result	Ref.
Bump	David McCormack, Matteo Zingales	Nominated	
Jack Irish	David McCormack, Antony Partos	Won	
Ms Fisher's Modern Murder Mysteries	Burkhard Dallwitz, Brett Aplin, Dmitri Golovko	Nominated	
Wakefield	Maria Alfonsine, Caitlin Yeo	Nominated	

=== Best Original Song Composed for the Screen ===
Song title	Work	Composer	Result	Ref.
"Bagi-La-M Bargan"	Looky Looky Here Comes Cooky	Nathan Bird, Fred Leone, Daniel Rankine	Won	
"Fragile Soul"	Ellie Was Here	Brontë Horder	Nominated	
"On My Way"	The Mitchells vs. the Machines	Alex Lahey, Sophie Payten, Gabriel Strum	Nominated	
"Suck My Cherry"	Freaky	Luke Dubber, Beatrice Lewis, Joel Ma, Claire Nakazawa, Mieh Nakazawa, Angus Stuart	Nominated	

=== Best Soundtrack Album ===
Title	Composer	Result	Ref.
Bluey: The Album	Joff Bush, David Barber, Helena Czajka, Marly Lüske, Lachlan Nicolson, Simon Peach	Won	
Buckley's Chance	Christopher Gordon	Nominated	
The Greenhouse	Freya Berkhout	Nominated	
The Vigil	Michael Yezerski	Nominated	

=== Best Television Theme ===
Title	Composer	Result	Ref.
100% Wolf – Legend of the Moonstone	Ned Beckley, Josh Hogan, Joni Hogan	Nominated	
Halifax: Retribution	Cezary Skubiszewski, Jan Skubiszewski	Won	
Hungry Ghosts	Roger Mason	Nominated	
Wakefield	Maria Alfonsine	Nominated	

=== Most Performed Screen Composer – Australia ===
Composer	Result	Ref.
Anthony El-Ammar	Nominated	
Adam Gock, Dinesh Wicks	Won	
Jay Stewart	Nominated	
Mitch Stewart	Nominated	

=== Most Performed Screen Composer – Overseas ===
Composer	Result	Ref.
Adam Gock, Dinesh Wicks	Nominated	
Alastair Ford	Nominated	
Neil Sutherland	Won	
Michael Yezerski	Nominated	
