= APRA Music Awards of 2014 =

Annual Australian music awards

- Date: 23 May 2014
- Location: Brisbane City Hall
- Hosted by: Brian Nankervis
- Website: apraamcos.com.au/awards/2014-awards

The Australian Performing Right Association Awards of 2014 (generally known as APRA Awards) are a series of related awards which include the APRA Music Awards, Art Music Awards, and Screen Music Awards. The APRA Music Awards of 2014 was the 32nd annual ceremony by the Australasian Performing Right Association (APRA) and the Australasian Mechanical Copyright Owners Society (AMCOS) to award outstanding achievements in contemporary songwriting, composing and publishing. The ceremony was held on 23 June 2014 at the Brisbane City Hall, for the first time. The host for the ceremony was Brian Nankervis, adjudicator on SBS-TV's RocKwiz.

The Art Music Awards were distributed on 26 August at the Plaza Ballroom, Melbourne. These were provided by APRA, AMCOS and Australian Music Centre (AMC) to recognise "artistic achievement and excellence within the field of Australia's art music industry." The Screen Music Awards were issued on 12 November by APRA, AMCOS and Australian Guild of Screen Composers (AGSC), which "acknowledges excellence and innovation in the genre of screen composition".

On 28 May nominations for the APRA Music Awards were announced on multiple news sources, with Birds of Tokyo and Vance Joy being the most nominated artists with four each. A total of 13 awards were presented, with Lindy Morrison honoured by the Ted Albert Award for Outstanding Services to Australian Music. Morrison is the National Welfare Coordinator of Support Act Limited – a music industry charity; previously she was on the board of Phonographic Performance Company of Australia (PPCA) for 20 years and, even earlier, a drummer for the Go-Betweens (1980–89). Sia was presented with Songwriter of the Year for the second consecutive year – the first artist to ever do so. The APRA Music Awards ceremony highlights were broadcast on the MAX network on 9 July 2014.

== Presenters ==
At the APRA Music Awards ceremony on 23 June 2014, aside from the host, Brian Nankervis, the presenters were Amanda Brown and Robert Forster (both ex-the Go-Betweens, alongside Morrison) as well as Kate Miller-Heidke.

== Performances ==
The APRA Music Awards ceremony showcased performances by:

- Megan Washington
- Sheppard
- Colin Hay
- Gossling
- Kate Miller-Heidke
- Melody Pool
- Kirin J. Callinan

== APRA Music Awards ==
=== Blues & Roots Work of the Year ===
Title and/or artist	Writer(s)	Publisher(s)	Result
"Avenger" – The Bamboos	Lance Ferguson, Ella Thompson	Perfect Pitch Publishing Pty Ltd obo (on behalf of) Full Thought Publishing	Nominated
"Get You out of Here" – Busby Marou	Thomas Busby, Jeremy Marou	Sony/ATV Music Publishing Australia P/L	Nominated
"Luck" – Busby Marou	Thomas Busby, Don Walker	Sony/ATV Music Publishing Australia P/L	Nominated
"Only One" – John Butler Trio	John Butler	Family Music Pty Ltd	Won
"Lygon Street Meltdown" – Melbourne Ska Orchestra	Nicky Bomba, Barry Deenick	Mushroom Music Pty Ltd	Nominated

=== Breakthrough Songwriter of the Year ===
Title and/or artist	Writer(s)	Publisher(s)	Result
Jagwar Ma	Jono Ma, Gabriel Winterfield	Sony/ATV Music Publishing Australia Pty Ltd	Nominated
Kylie Sackley	Kylie Sackley	Fable Music Pty Ltd obo Steel Wheels Music	Nominated
Louis Schoorl	Louis Schoorl	Universal Music Publishing Pty Ltd	Won
Hiatus Kaiyote	Paul Bender, Simon Mavin, Perrin Moss, Naomi Saalfield	—N/a	Nominated
Vance Joy	James Keogh (aka Vance Joy)	Mushroom Music Pty Ltd obo WAU Publishing	Nominated

=== Country Work of the Year ===
Title and/or artist	Writer(s)	Publisher(s)	Result
"I Learned the Hard Way" – Chelsea Basham	Chelsea Basham	—N/a	Nominated
"Flying with the King" – Lee Kernaghan	Colin Buchanan, Lee Kernaghan, Garth Porter	Universal Music Publishing Pty Ltd, Perfect Pitch Publishing Pty Ltd	Won
"Be with You Tonight" – O'Shea	Tim Nichols, Jay O'Shea, Mark O'Shea	J.Albert & Son Pty Limited	Nominated
"Thank You Angels" – O'Shea	Jay O'Shea, Mark O'Shea, Matthew Scullion	J.Albert & Son Pty Limited, Piney Range Publishing Pty Ltd	Nominated
"The Girl, the Bottle, the Memory" – The Wolfe Brothers	Nicholas Wolfe	Perfect Pitch Publishing Pty Ltd	Nominated

=== Dance Work of the Year ===
Title and/or artist	Writer(s)	Publisher(s)	Result
"Alive" – Empire of the Sun	Steven Bach, Nick Littlemore, Peter Mayes, Jonathan Sloan, Luke Steele	Bach to Bach Music, Universal Music Publishing Pty Ltd obo Solola Ltd, Universal Music Publishing Pty Ltd obo Chenfeld Ltd, Mushroom Music Pty Ltd obo Downtown Music Publishing, Sony/ATV Music Publishing Australia P/L	Nominated
"Holdin On" – Flume	Flume, Otis Redding	Kobalt Music Publishing Australia P/L obo Future Classic Pty Ltd and Universal Music Publishing Pty Ltd obo Verse Music Group LLC, Essex Music Australia Pty Ltd obo Irving Music	Won
"Saved in a Bottle" – The Potbelleez	David Greene, Ilan Kidron, Erik Lewander, Jonathan Murphy	Universal Music Publishing Pty Ltd obo MCDJ Music, Universal Music Publishing Pty Ltd obo The Kennel AB	Nominated
"Promises" – The Presets	Julian Hamilton, Kim Moyes	EMI Music Publishing Australia Pty Ltd	Nominated
"Bring It Back" – Will Sparks & Joel Fletcher	Will Sparks, Joel Fletcher	120 Publishing Pty Ltd	Nominated

=== International Work of the Year ===
Title and/or artist	Writer(s)	Publisher(s)	Result
"Blurred Lines" – Robin Thicke, T.I., and Pharrell Williams	Clifford Harris, Robin Thicke, Pharrell Williams	Deyjah's Daddy Muzik, Universal/MCA Music Publishing Pty Ltd obo I Like 'Em Thicke Music, EMI Music Publishing Australia Pty Ltd obo More Water from Nazareth Publishing	Won
"Can't Hold Us" – Macklemore & Ryan Lewis featuring Ray Dalton	Ben Haggerty, Ryan Lewis	Kobalt Music Publishing Australia P/L obo Macklemore Publishing, Kobalt Music Publishing Australia P/L obo Ryan Lewis Publishing	Nominated
"Don't You Worry Child" – Swedish House Mafia	Axel Hedfors, Sebastian Ingrosso, Fragogiannis Josefsson, Martin Lindstrom, Michel Zitron	Universal Music Publishing Pty Ltd obo Universal Music Publishing AB, Sony/ATV Music Publishing Australia P/L obo Sony ATV Music Publishing (UK) Limited and Universal Music Publishing Pty Ltd obo Universal Music Publishing AB, Kobalt Music Publishing Australia P/L obo Lateral MGMT London Stockholm AB, Mushroom Music Pty Ltd obo BMG Chrysalis Scandinavia AB	Nominated
"Let Her Go" – Passenger	Michael Rosenberg (aka Passenger)	Universal Music Publishing	Nominated
"Pompeii" – Bastille	Daniel Smith	Universal Music Publishing Pty Ltd obo WWKD LTD	Nominated

=== Most Played Australian Work ===
Title and/or artist	Writer(s)	Publisher(s)	Result
"Lanterns" – Birds of Tokyo	Ian Berney, Ian Kenny, Glenn Sarangapany, Adam Spark, Adam Weston	Mushroom Music Pty Ltd	Won
"Let Me Down Easy" – Sheppard	Jay Bovino, Amy Sheppard, George Sheppard	—N/a	Nominated
"Resolution" – Matt Corby	Matt Corby, Dominic Salole	Mushroom Music Pty Ltd obo BMG Rights Management (UK) Ltd, Warner/Chappell Music Australia obo Heavy Sheet Music and Hanseatic Musikverlag GMBH & Co KG	Nominated
"Riptide" – Vance Joy	James Keogh (aka Vance Joy)	Mushroom Music Pty Ltd obo WAU Publishing	Nominated
"You" – Nathaniel	Anthony Egizii, David Musumeci, Nathaniel Willemse	EMI Music Publishing Australia Pty Ltd, Sony/ATV Music Publ Allegro (Aust) P/L	Nominated

=== Most Played Australia Work Overseas ===
Title and/or artist	Writer(s)	Publisher(s)	Result
"Somebody That I Used To Know" – Gotye featuring Kimbra	Wally de Backer (aka Gotye), Luiz Bonfá	J Albert and Son Pty Ltd obo Op Shop Songs Pty Ltd and Kobalt Music Publishing Australia P/L, Warner/Chappell Music Australia Pty Ltd	Won

=== Outstanding International Achievement Award ===
Title and/or artist	Publisher(s)	Result
Ella Yelich-O'Connor (aka Lorde) & Joel Little	Native Tongue Music Publishing/EMI Music Publishing Australia Pty Ltd	Won

=== Pop Work of the Year ===
Title and/or artist	Writer(s)	Publisher(s)	Result
"Let Me Down Easy" – Sheppard	Jay Bovino, Amy Sheppard, George Sheppard	—N/a	Nominated
"Resolution" – Matt Corby	Matt Corby, Dominic Salole	Mushroom Music Pty Ltd obo BMG Rights Management (UK) Ltd, Warner/Chappell Music Australia obo Heavy Sheet Music and Hanseatic Musikverlag GMBH & Co KG	Nominated
"Riptide" – Vance Joy	James Keogh (aka Vance Joy)	Mushroom Music Pty Ltd obo WAU Publishing	Won
"What You've Done to Me" – Samantha Jade	Tania Doko, Anthony Egizii, Jorgen Elofsson, David Musumeci	Sony/ATV Music Publishing Australia P/L obo Ted Company Pty, EMI Music Publishing Australia Pty Ltd, Universal Music Publishing MGB Australia obo Idas Songs	Nominated
"You" – Nathaniel	Anthony Egizii, David Musumeci, Nathaniel Willemse	EMI Music Publishing Australia Pty Ltd, Sony/ATV Music Publ Allegro (Aust) P/L	Nominated

=== Rock Work of the Year ===
Title and/or artist	Writer(s)	Publisher(s)	Result
"Battleships" – Bernard Fanning	Bernard Fanning	Universal Music Publishing MGB Australia	Nominated
"Lanterns" – Birds of Tokyo	Ian Berney, Ian Kenny, Glenn Sarangapany, Adam Spark, Adam Weston	Mushroom Music Pty Ltd	Won
"Southern Sun" – Boy & Bear	Killian Gavin, Jonathon Hart, Timothy Hart, David Hosking	Sony/ATV Music Publishing Australia P/L	Nominated
"Tell Me How It Ends" – Bernard Fanning	Bernard Fanning, Joey Waronker	Universal Music Publishing MGB Australia, Mushroom Music Pty Ltd obo BMG Platinum Songs	Nominated
"When the Night Falls Quiet" – Birds of Tokyo	Ian Berney, Ian Kenny, Glen Sarangapany, Adam Spark, Adam Weston	Mushroom Music Pty Ltd	Nominated

=== Song of the Year ===
Title and/or artist	Writer(s)	Publisher(s)	Result
"A Moat You Can Stand In" – The Drones	Stephen Hesketh, Fiona Kitchin, Gareth Liddiard, Dan Luscombe, Mike Noga	Mushroom Music Pty Ltd	Nominated
"Is This How You Feel" – The Preatures	Thomas Champion, Luke Davison, Isabella Manfredi, Jack Moffitt	Mushroom Music Pty Ltd	Nominated
"Lanterns" – Birds of Tokyo	Ian Berney, Ian Kenny, Glenn Sarangapany, Adam Spark, Adam Weston	Mushroom Music Pty Ltd	Nominated
"Resolution" – Matt Corby	Matt Corby, Dominic Salole	Mushroom Music Pty Ltd obo BMG Rights Management (UK) Ltd, Warner/Chappell Music Australia obo Heavy Sheet Music and Hanseatic Musikverlag GMBH & Co KG	Nominated
"Riptide" – Vance Joy	James Keogh (aka Vance Joy)	Mushroom Music Pty Ltd obo WAU Publishing	Won

=== Songwriter of the Year ===
- Sia (aka Sia Furler)

=== Ted Albert Award for Outstanding Services to Australian Music ===
- Lindy Morrison

=== Urban Work of the Year ===
Title and/or artist	Writer(s)	Publisher(s)	Result
"Act Your Age" – Bliss n Eso featuring Bluejuice	Alexander Burnett, Jamie Cibej, Jerry Craib, James Hauptmann, Max MacKinnon (aka Eso), Jonathan Notley (aka Bliss), Jacob Stone, Stavros Yiannoukas	Mushroom Music Pty Ltd obo Ivy League Music Pty Ltd, Kobalt Music Publishing Australia P/L obo Bluejuice Music Group Pty Limited, Mushroom Music Pty Ltd	Won
"House of Dreams" – Bliss n Eso	M-Phazes, Max MacKinnon, Jonathan Notley	Mushroom Music Pty Ltd	Nominated
"On and On" – Illy	Illy (aka Alasdair Murray), Jan Skubiszewski	Mushroom Music Pty Ltd obo WAU Publishing, Mushroom Music Pty Ltd	Nominated
"Run Alone" – 360	Kaelyn Behr (aka Styalz Fuego), Matthew Colwell (aka 360)	Sony/ATV Music Publishing Australia P/L / Universal Music Publishing Pty Ltd	Nominated
"Youngbloods" – Illy	Illy, M-Phazes, Joel Birch, Troy Brady, Ryan Burt, Ahren Stringer	Mushroom Music Pty Ltd obo WAU Publishing, Mushroom Music Pty Ltd, Native Tongue Music Publishing	Nominated

== Art Music Awards ==
=== Work of the Year – Instrumental ===
Title	Composer	Performer	Result
Aerea	Mary Finsterer	Monash Art Ensemble	Won
Inferno	Elliott Gyger	Michael Kieran Harvey	Nominated
String Quartet No 2	Matthew Hindson	Elias String Quartet	Nominated
String Quartet No 5	Andrew Ford	Australian String Quartet	Nominated

=== Work of the Year – Jazz ===
Title	Composer	Performer	Result
Everything Here Is Possible	Alister Spence, Myra Melford	Alister Spence and Myra Melford	Nominated
Happy	Quentin Angus	Quentin Angus, Alon Tayar, Bambam Rodriguez and Ari Hoenig	Nominated
Network of Lines	Tilman Robinson	Tilman Robinson, Peter Knight, Callum G'Froerer, Erikki Veltheim, Judith Hamann, Brett Thompson, Berish Bilander, Sam Zerna and Hugh Harvey	Nominated
Tall Tales	Paul Grabowsky	Monash Art Ensemble	Won

=== Work of the Year – Orchestral ===
Title	Composer	Performer	Result
Compassion	Nigel Westlake, Lior Attar (aka Lior)	Lior (vocals), Sydney Symphony Orchestra, Nigel Westlake (conductor)	Nominated
Golden Years	James Ledger	Margaret Blades (soloist), West Australian Symphony Orchestra, Otto Tausk (conductor)	Won
Lake Ice: (Missed Tales No 1)	Mary Finsterer	Kees Boersma, Sydney Symphony Orchestra, Jessica Cottis (conductor)	Nominated
The Last Days of Socrates	Brett Dean, Graeme Ellis (text)	Peter Coleman-Wright (soloist), Melbourne Symphony Orchestra and Chorus, Simone Young (conductor)	Nominated

=== Work of the Year – Vocal or Choral ===
Title	Composer / librettist	Performer	Result
From a Black Sky	Sandra France / Helen Nourse	The Street, David Kram (conductor)	Nominated
Last Words	Andrew Ford / Tim Winton, Dorothy Porter, et al.	Jane Sheldon and the Seraphim Trio	Won
Moon: an Epic Song of Love	Gordon Hamilton / Venero Armanno	The Australian Voices, Gordon Hamilton (conductor)	Nominated
The Pomegranate Cycle	Eve Klein	Eve Klein	Nominated

=== Performance of the Year ===
Title	Composer / librettist	Performer	Result
Icy Disintegration	Annie Hsieh	Arcko Symphonic Ensemble, Timothy Phillips (conductor)	Nominated
Lake Ice: (Missed Tales No 1)	Mary Finsterer	Kees Boersma, Sydney Symphony Orchestra, Jessica Cottis (conductor)	Nominated
The Last Days of Socrates	Brett Dean / Graeme Ellis	Peter Coleman-Wright (soloist), Melbourne Symphony Orchestra and Chorus, Simone Young (conductor)	Won
String Quartet No 2	Matthew Hindson	Elias String Quartet	Nominated

=== Award for Excellence by an Individual ===
Individual	Work	Result
Catherine Crock	The Hush Collection, Volumes 1-13	Won
Carl Vine	Exemplary contribution to Musica Viva Australia in 2013 as Artistic Director, and to the wider arts and cultural industry	Nominated
David Montgomery	AMEB percussion project	Nominated
Kim Waldock	Contribution to music education in Australia	Nominated

=== Award for Excellence by an Organisation ===
Organisation	Work	Result
Arcko Symphonic Ensemble	2013 activities	Nominated
Australian Art Orchestra	Touring, community building, recording, creativity & leadership	Won
Chamber Made Opera	Commissioning & presenting cutting-edge chamber opera	Nominated
Frequency Oz for	2013 activities	Nominated

=== Award for Excellence in Music Education ===
Organisation / individual	Work	Result
Cathy Aggett	New Australian art songs for low voice	Won
Karen Carey	MLC School (Sydney) Opera House Concert 2013 plus a legacy of 25 years of concerts and commissions	Nominated
Topology	"Top Up" music education program	Nominated
West Australian Symphony Orchestra	2013 education program	Nominated

=== Award for Excellence in a Regional Area ===
Organisation / individual	Work	Result
Bogong Centre	Sound Culture, Bogong Electric	Nominated
Goulburn Regional Conservatorium	The Goulburn Oratorio	Won

=== Award for Excellence in Experimental Music ===
Organisation / individual	Work	Result
Cat Hope	Drawn from Sound exhibition	Won
Ensemble Offspring with Oren Ambarchi and Martin Ng	Ligeti Morphed	Nominated
Eugene Ughetti, Robin Fox and Speak Percussion	Transducer	Nominated
Madeleine Flynn and Tim Humphrey & the City of Melbourne	5 Short Blasts	Nominated

=== Award for Excellence in Jazz ===
Organisation / individual	Work	Result
Alister Spence and Myra Melford	Everything Here Is Possible	Won
Andrea Keller	Creation, release and presentation of three contemporary jazz projects in 2013	Nominated
Jonathan Zwartz	The Remembering and Forgetting of the Air (recording)	Nominated
The Street Theatre	Capital Jazz Project – a nine-day midwinter jazz festival	Nominated

=== Distinguished Services to Australian Music ===
Organisation / individual	Result
Richard Gill	Won

== Screen Music Awards ==
=== International Achievement Award ===
Organisation / individual	Result
Adam Gock and Dinesh Wicks – The D.A's Office	Won

=== Feature Film Score of the Year ===
Title	Composer	Result
Adoration	Christopher Gordon	Nominated
Healing	David Hirschfelder	Nominated
The Railway Man	David Hirschfelder	Won
Sororal	Christopher de Groot	Nominated

=== Best Music for an Advertisement ===
Title	Composer	Result
Canon – "Seeing"	Ramesh Sathiah	Nominated
Replay – "Eco Warriors"	Alejandro Gomez Sánchez	Nominated
Tiger beer – "Charlie Ruedpokanon" Stuntman	Antony Partos, Matteo Zingales	Nominated
Tourism and Events Queensland – "Where Australia Shines"	Ryan Walsh	Won

=== Best Music for Children's Television ===
Title	Composer	Result
Get Ace – Series 1	Russell Thornton	Won
Mako: Island of Secrets – Series 1: "Battlelines"	Ricky Edwards, Brett Aplin	Nominated
Time Tremors – Series 1	Benjamin Speed	Nominated
Transformers: Rescue Bots – "Space Bots"	Christopher Elves	Nominated

=== Best Music for a Documentary ===
Title	Composer	Result
The Dancer from the Dance	Edward Primrose	Nominated
Fallout	Antony Partos	Nominated
I Am a Girl	John Gray	Nominated
Once My Mother	Cezary Skubiszewski	Won

=== Best Music for a Mini-Series or Telemovie ===
Title	Composer	Result
The Broken Shore	Cezary Skubizewski	Nominated
The Killing Field	Basil Hogios, Caitlin Yeo	Nominated
The Outlaw Michael Howe	Roger Mason	Won
Parer's War	Cezary Skubizewski	Nominated

=== Best Music for a Short Film ===
Title	Composer	Result
Blood Pulls a Gun	Basil Hogios, Jack Moffitt	Nominated
The iMom	Haydn Walker	Nominated
Scission	Jonathan Dreyfus	Nominated
Where Do Lilacs Come From	Luke Howard	Won

=== Best Music for a Television Series or Serial ===
Series or Serial	Episode title	Composer	Result
The Doctor Blake Mysteries	"Series 2 Episode 10: An Invincible Summer"	Dale Cornelius	Nominated
Rake	"Series 3 Episode 1"	David McCormack, Antony Partos, Michael Lira	Nominated
Redfern Now	"Series 2 Episode 3: Babe in Arms	Antony Partos	Nominated
Serangoon Road	"Episode 6"	Cezary Skubiszewski, Jan Skubiszewski	Won

=== Best Original Song Composed for the Screen ===
Song title	Work	Composer	Result
"Don't Let Him Go"	Rake	David McCormack, Antony Partos	Won
"Giggle Galaxy"	Giggle and Hoot	Terry Mann	Nominated
"God Knows I Would"	The Moodys	Cameron Bruce	Nominated
"The Harvest & The Glory"	The Outlaw Michael Howe	Roger Mason	Nominated

=== Best Soundtrack Album ===
Title	Composer	Result
Adoration	Christopher Gordon, Antony Partos	Nominated
The Broken Shore	Cezary Skubiszewski	Won
Healing	David Hirschfelder	Nominated
The Railway Man	David Hirschfelder	Nominated

=== Best Television Theme ===
Title	Composer	Result
Fat Tony & Co.	Burkhard Dallwitz	Won
The Gods of Wheat Street	Jeff Lang	Nominated
Serangoon Road	Cezary Skubiszewski, Jan Skubiszewski	Nominated
Wentworth Series 2	Richard Pleasance	Nominated

=== Most Performed Screen Composer – Australia ===
Composer	Result
Adam Gock, Dinesh Wicks	Nominated
Jay Stewart	Won
Neil Sutherland	Nominated
Brenton White	Nominated

=== Most Performed Screen Composer – Overseas ===
Composer	Result
Ricky Edwards	Nominated
Adam Gock, Dinesh Wicks	Nominated
Garry McDonald, Laurie Stone	Nominated
Neil Sutherland	Won
