= Georgia Scott =

Australian composer

- Occupation: Composer
- Notable work: Her Dark Marauder, Score for Placeless, My3linati0ns

Georgia Scott is an Australian composer, orchestrator and arranger. She graduated with honours from the Royal College of Music, London and completed her Master of Music at the Sydney Conservatorium of Music in 2020 where she was supported by the Doris Burnett-Ford scholarship as part of the 2018-2019 Composing Women Program.

Georgia was the recipient of the 2021 Australia Council National Arts and Disability Award for Young Artist. She has worked with the Sydney Symphony Orchestra, Melbourne Symphony Orchestra, Sydney Chamber Opera, The Australian Ballet, Moorambilla Voices, Gondwana Junior, Australian World Orchestra, Flautist Claire Chase, Orchestra Victoria, Janáček Philharmonic Orchestra and West Australian Youth Orchestra.

Georgia's notable works include "Her Dark Marauder" which was performed by the Sydney Chamber Opera at Carriageworks and premiered online in 2020, and was a finalist in the 2021 APRA AMC Art Music Awards for Dramatic Work of the Year.
