= La Passion de Simone =

Oratorio by Kaija Saariaho

- A musical journey in 15 stations
- Oratorio by Kaija Saariaho
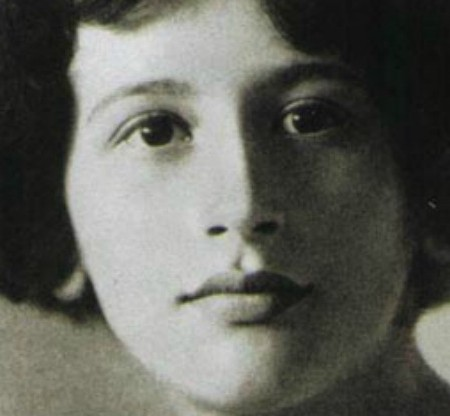
- Simone Weil on whose life and writings the libretto is based
- Text: by Amin Maalouf
- Language: French
- Based on: life and writings of Simone Weil
- Performed: 26 November 2006: Vienna
- Movements: 15
- Scoring: soprano; spoken voice; choir; orchestra; electronic instruments

La Passion de Simone is an oratorio (or opera) composed by Kaija Saariaho to a libretto in French by Amin Maalouf, first premiered in a staging by Peter Sellars. The work, subtitled "a musical journey in 15 stations", centers on the life and writings of Simone Weil and was conceived in the Passion Play tradition with episodes in her life linked to the Stations of the Cross. It is composed for SATB chorus, soprano soloist, spoken voice, orchestra and electronic instruments.

== Performance history ==
La Passion de Simone was commissioned jointly by the New Crowned Hope festival in Vienna, the Barbican Centre, the Los Angeles Philharmonic, and the Lincoln Center for the Performing Arts. It had its world premiere on 26 November 2006 at the Jugendstiltheater in Vienna as part of Peter Sellars' New Crowned Hope festival. The world premiere performers were the Klangforum Wien orchestra conducted by Susanna Mälkki; the Arnold Schoenberg Choir conducted by Erwin Ortner; Finnish soprano Pia Freund as the narrator; Michael Schumacher as the silent dancer (a directorial addition by Sellars), and Dominique Blanc as the voice of Simone Weil.

The work had its United Kingdom premiere at the Barbican Centre, London in July 2007 and its US premiere in August 2008 at the Lincoln Center, New York City, as part of the Mostly Mozart Festival. Unlike previous performances, the French premiere at the Opéra Bastille in June 2009 was performed without Sellars' staging. Nevertheless, Dawn Upshaw, for whom the role of the narrator was originally written, performed in all three premieres.

In February 2026, the work was performed by the Curtis Institute of Music in Philadelphia at the Philadelphia Film Centre. The production was directed by Marcus Shields and conducted by Marc Lowenstein, with Nikan Ingabire Kanate as the narrator.

== Chamber version (2013) ==
On a suggestion by director Aleksi Barrière and conductor Clément Mao-Takacs, the composer created a chamber version of the piece that has been more popular (both in terms of critical response and number of productions) than the original. It is the same length as the original version and the soloist's vocal line and the spoken text are unchanged. But the orchestration is for 19 musicians and uses no electronic elements, and four solo voices replace the SATB chorus –a feature that Saariaho later reused and developed in her opera Only the Sound Remains, which she started composing soon after completing the arrangement of La Passion de Simone.

This chamber version was premiered on 14 November 2013 in Bratislava, in the framework of the Melos-Ethos Festival for Contemporary Music, in a production conceived and realized by the French music theatre company La Chambre aux échos. The main character was performed by soprano Karen Vourc'h, accompanied by a vocal quartet and an actress, and the chamber ensemble Secession Orchestra, conducted by Clément Mao-Takacs. The stage direction was devised by Aleksi Barrière. This "poignant production", which has been described as "superb in every sense" by the press, has since toured worldwide with soprano Sayuri Araida in the main role, and was performed as the local premiere of the chamber version in France, Finland and the USA among others.

Other stage productions were eventually created of this chamber version, among which: a new staging by Peter Sellars starring Julia Bullock (Deutsche Oper Berlin, 2015; Ojai Music Festival, 2016); the Australian premiere performance by Sydney Chamber Opera at the Carriageworks for the 2019 Sydney Festival, with soprano Jane Sheldon, conducted by Jack Symonds and directed by Imara Savage; and a semi-staged performance conceived by conductor Christian Karlsen with Anne Sofie von Otter (Royal Swedish Opera, 2020).
