= Damien Ricketson =

Australian composer (born 1973)

- Born: Damien Ricketson; 9 May 1973 (age 53); Wollongong, Australia
- Education: Sydney Conservatorium of Music (Bachelor of Music (Composition)), Doctorate of Music
- Occupations: Composer, artistic director, lecturer, performer
- Years active: 1991–present

Damien Ricketson (born 9 May 1973) is an Australian composer of contemporary classical music. He is best known for his innovative compositional practice and in his capacity as the co-founder and co-artistic director of Ensemble Offspring. He is currently an academic at the Sydney Conservatorium of Music, University of Sydney of which he is also an alumnus.

== Biography ==
Born in Wollongong, Ricketson studied composition at the Sydney Conservatorium of Music from 1991 to 1995, after which he continued his studies at the Royal Conservatory of The Hague from 1996 to 1998 with Louis Andriessen. He holds a PhD from the Sydney Conservatorium of Music, where he also teaches. Ricketson is the co-founder and former co-artistic director of the Sydney-based Ensemble Offspring – an organisation dedicated to the performance of new music.

Ricketson's music is characterised by colourful sound-worlds, novel forms and is often multisensory in nature. An early interest in Spectral music can be seen in his frequent exploration of unusual timbres and microtonal pitch structures. Some Shade of Blue, for example, features a newly invented string instrument in a just intonation system. Recent stylistic tendencies have moved away from an earlier abstract style, exemplified in works such as Ptolemy's Onion, towards what the composer terms a more "corporeal" approach embracing tangible references to existing music and a highly physical performance aesthetic. His works are heavily gesture-focussed, with pieces such as Imagining Le Verrier and Chinese Whisper being based upon "sets of physical actions on instruments". This extends to the idea of open instrumentation in later pieces such as Trace Elements, which is intended to be playable by any two string and two woodwind instruments. Indeed, much of Ricketson's recent work reveals an ongoing interest in open forms with works such as Same Steps, Length and Breath and Not by Halves employing unconventional notational strategies to elicit a creative and collaborative engagement from performers. Ricketson's major show-length works such as The Secret Noise and Fractured Again also show an interest in multimedia and hybrid arts practice, combining conventional acoustic instruments with unconventional (sometimes self-built) instruments and electronic music as well as other media.

Although Ricketson's materials are eclectic, often including disparate processes within the one work, Gordon Kerry describes his music as aesthetically late-modernist in that it is "experimental in form and speculative in content". Frequently, this involves the inclusion of musical references and quotations put through "distorting filters". This technique is particularly notable in the work A Line Has Two, and more recently in the multi-movement work Fractured Again. This work explores the musical language and thematic implications of glass instruments, quoting Donizetti, Mozart and Crumb throughout.

Ricketson's hybrid work for Ensemble Offspring, The Secret Noise, featured installations, dance performances and theatre within a concert setting. The major thematic concern was music shielded from public view. The project was extremely positively received in 2014, with Maxim Boon of Limelight naming it "a trail-blazing triumph" and the work went on to receive a new production presented by Arts House and Melbourne Festival.

== Awards, commissions and residencies ==
The Secret Noise won the 2015 Art Music Award for Instrumental Work of the Year. Ricketson's string quartet So We Begin Afresh (for the Grainger Quartet) received the NSW State Award for the Best Composition by an Australian Composer at the 2008 AMC/APRA Classical Music Awards. He also received the international Lady Panufnik Prize (Poland) for Chinese Whisper, and was selected by ABC Classic FM to represent Australian music at the Paris International Rostrum with his work Lamina. Ricketson's Ptolemy's Onion received the Marienberg Spring Award for an Outstanding Australian Composition and was subsequently chosen for the Gaudeamus International Music Week. In 2016, his works were featured in a profile concert as part of the Australian Voices series presented by ANAM and the Melbourne Recital Centre.

Ricketson has received commissions from: Warsaw Autumn International Festival of Contemporary Music; the Transit Festival (Belgium); The Song Company; the Australian Chamber Orchestra; Symphony Australia; Continuum Sax; ABC Classic FM; the Portuguese-based Drumming Grupo de Percussão, the MLC School Burwood, Speak Percussion and piano soloist Zubin Kanga.

Ricketson has been artist-in-residence at the Banff Centre, Canada; the Bundanon Estate (Shoalhaven); the University of Wollongong and the Peggy Glanville-Hicks House (Sydney).

== Notable works ==
Notable works include:

- Ptolemy's Onion (1998), for amplified bass flute and string quartet
- Chinese Whisper (2002), for solo electric violin and electric cello and 12 strings
- Trace Elements (2003), a tablature quartet for any two wind and any two string instruments
- A Line Has Two (2004), a show-length work for soprano aulos, tusut, 2x clarinets, 2x percussion on a text by Chris Wallace-Crabbe
- So We Begin Afresh (2007), for string quartet
- Fractured Again (2010), a show-length multimedia work including musical instruments made of glass
- Some Shade of Blue (2011), a microtonal work for a newly invented string instrument and retuned vibraphone
- The Secret Noise (2014), a show-length music-dance collaboration exploring secret music practices.
- Aeolian Playgrounds (2014–), ongoing installation project featuring sculptures made from plastic pipes and performed by the public using leaf-blowers.
- Rendition Clinic (2015), a work for percussion and modified strobe lights
- The Howling Girls (2018), wordless opera directed by Adena Jacobs, at Carriageworks
