= Sydney Chamber Opera =

Australian opera company

- Origin: Sydney, Australia
- Genres: Contemporary opera, chamber opera
- Years active: 2011–present
- Website: sydneychamberopera.com

Sydney Chamber Opera is an opera company based in Sydney, Australia. It is a resident company at Carriageworks. The company was founded in 2010 by Louis Garrick and Jack Symonds. Its first production was in February 2011 and it has since produced between two and four 20th- and 21st-century chamber operas each year. Its repertoire typically consists of world premieres of Australian operas and recent international works receiving their Australian premieres, including stagings of song cycles or non-traditional stage works.

== History and repertoire ==
Sydney Chamber Opera began with the world premiere of Notes from Underground by Jack Symonds and Pierce Wilcox, an adaptation of Dostoevsky's novel at the Cellblock Theatre, Darlinghurst. The Cunning Little Vixen, The Lighthouse, Owen Wingrave, Exil, His Music Burns, Mayakovsky, Fly Away Peter, An Index of Metals and O Mensch! were presented at Carriageworks and I Have Had Enough, In the Penal Colony and Climbing Toward Midnight at National Institute of Dramatic Art. Through The Gates was a performance for the 18th Biennale of Sydney at Pier 2/3 Walsh Bay amidst a large-scale installation by Belgian artist Honoré δ'O and Victory Over the Sun was another site-specific commission by the 20th Biennale of Sydney for performance on Cockatoo Island, reimagining an early-twentieth century Futurist work with Western Sydney artist Justene Williams. His Music Burns, Passion and O Mensch! by Pascal Dusapin, and Biographica were presented in the 2014, 2016 and 2017 Sydney Festivals. Passion was a revival of a production by Pierre Audi. Fly Away Peter toured to Arts Centre Melbourne in association with Melbourne Festival in October 2015, and in 2018 the previous year's production of The Rape of Lucretia was co-presented by Victorian Opera and Tasmanian Symphony Orchestra at the Dark Mofo Festival.

== Past productions ==
=== 2011–2015 ===
WP= World premiere; AP= Australian premiere

- Notes from Underground (Jack Symonds / Pierce Wilcox) – WP dir. Netta Yashchin (2011)
- The Cunning Little Vixen (Leoš Janáček arr. Jonathan Dove) – AP dir. Kate Gaul (2011)
- I Have Had Enough (JS Bach / Jack Symonds) – WP (Symonds) dir. Kip Williams (2011)
- In the Penal Colony (Philip Glass / Rudolph Wurlitzer) – AP dir. Imara Savage (2012)
- Through The Gates (various songs by Bach, Barber, Debussy, Mahler, Poulenc, Shostakovich et al.) dir. Kip Williams (2012)
- The Lighthouse (Peter Maxwell Davies) dir. Kip Williams (2012)
- Climbing Toward Midnight (Jack Symonds / Richard Wagner) – WP dir. Netta Yashchin (2013)
- Owen Wingrave (Benjamin Britten / Myfanwy Piper) – AP dir. Imara Savage (2013)
- Exil (Giya Kancheli) – AP dir. Adena Jacobs (2013)
- ...pas à pas – nulle part... (György Kurtág / Samuel Beckett) – AP dir. Sarah Giles (2014)
- Into the Little Hill (George Benjamin / Martin Crimp) – AP dir. Sarah Giles (2014)
- Mayakovsky (Michael Smetanin / Alison Croggon) – WP dir. Kat Henry (2014) – about the Russian poet Vladimir Mayakovsky
- Fly Away Peter (Elliott Gyger / Pierce Wilcox) – WP dir. Imara Savage (2015)
- An Index of Metals (Fausto Romitelli / Kenka Lekovich) – AP dir. Kip Williams (2015)

=== 2016–2020 ===
- Passion (Pascal Dusapin / Rita de Letteriis) – AP dir. Pierre Audi (revival dir. Miranda Lakerveld) (2016)
- O Mensch! (Pascal Dusapin / Friedrich Nietzsche) – AP dir. Sarah Giles (2016)
- Victory Over the Sun (Huw Belling / Pierce Wilcox) – WP dir. Justene Williams/ Pierce Wilcox (2016)
- Notes from Underground (Jack Symonds / Pierce Wilcox) – WP new version dir. Patrick Nolan (2016)
- Biographica (Opera by Mary Finsterer / Tom Wright) – WP dir. Janice Muller (2017)
- The Rape of Lucretia (Benjamin Britten / Ronald Duncan) dir. Kip Williams (2017)
- The Howling Girls (Damien Ricketson) – WP dir. Adena Jacobs (2018)
- Resonant Bodies Festival (featuring Sofia Jernberg, Rully Shabara, Deborah Kayser, Sonya Holowell, Mitchell Riley and Ariadne Greif) (2018)
- La Passion de Simone (Kaija Saariaho, Amin Maalouf) with Jane Sheldon, soprano; Jack Symonds, conductor – AP directed by Imara Savage (2019)
- Oscar and Lucinda (Elliot Gyger / Pierce Wilcox) with Jack Symonds, conductor; Patrick Nolan, director (2019)
- Breaking Glass (Georgia Scott / Peggy Polias / Josephine Macken / Bree van Reyk) – WP with Jack Symonds, conductor; Danielle Maas and Clemence Williams, directors (2020)

=== 2021– ===
- Future Remains (Double bill The Diary of One Who Disappeared by Leoš Janáček / Fumeblind Oracle Huw Belling and Pierce Wilcox) – WP with Alexander Berlage, director (2021)
- Poem for a Dried Up River (Music: Jane Sheldon, text: Alice Oswald) – AP (2021)
- In Song (Four programs of songs) – some AP and WP (2021)
- Awakening Shadow (Music from Britten's Canticles combined with music by Luke Styles) – AP (2022)
- Antarctica (Opera by Mary Finsterer / Tom Wright) – AP (2022)
- Earth.Voice.Body (Triple bill The Shape of the Earth by Jack Symonds and Pierce Wilcox; La voix humaine by Poulenc; Quatre instants by Kaija Saariaho and Amin Maalouf) (2023)
- Gilgamesh (Music: Jack Symonds, text: Louis Garrick, based on Epic of Gilgamesh, directed by Kip Williams) – WP (2024)

== Key personnel ==
Jack Symonds is the artistic director.

Huw Belling is principal artistic associate. Danielle Maas, Mitchell Riley, Jane Sheldon, James Wannan and Pierce Wilcox are artistic associates.

The company has typically engaged stage directors from a theatre background, often making their operatic debut, e.g. Sydney Theatre Company artistic director Kip Williams. The company has also been noted for developing talented young singers.
