= Leah Barclay =

Australian sound artist, composer and researcher

Leah Barclay (born 1985 in Adelaide, Australia) is an Australian sound artist, composer and researcher known for acoustic ecology, environmental field recording, sound walks. She is the president of the Australian Forum for Acoustic Ecology, and is currently a research fellow at the Queensland Conservatorium Research Centre. She is a multi-talented sound artist, sound activist and composer, raising environmental awareness through sound.

Leah Barclay organised the Sonic Environments Conference in 2016 hosted by The Queensland Conservatorium of Music in Brisbane, Australia.

Leah Barclay was part of the 100 Ways to Listen component of the World Science Festival 2017, where she ran Augmented Reality Soundwalks. Numerous sound artists and electronic musicians from the Queensland Conservatorium performed and did demonstrations as part of the 100 Ways to Listen component of the World Science Festival 2017.

Barclay primarily explores Biosphere Soundscapes and River Listening and raises environmental awareness utilising field recordings of endangered ecosystems as a form of acoustic ecology in her compositions and sound walks.

Leah Barclay organised the 100 Ways to Listen along with other prominent sound artists, performers and researchers, including Vanessa Tomlinson, John Ferguson and Erik Griswald, creating sonic playgrounds and installations for 100 Ways to Listen in 2017, along with student led demonstrations and performances from the Queensland Conservatorium of Music Technology department. At the 2021 APRA Art Music Awards she won an Award for Excellence in Experimental Music for Listening in the Wild (shared with Lyndon Davis and Tricia King).

== Biography ==
Barclay is the president of the Australian Forum for Acoustic Ecology, currently a research fellow at the Queensland Conservatorium Research Centre.

Leah Barclay organised the Sonic Environments Conference in 2016 hosted by the Queensland Conservatorium of Music in Brisbane, Australia.

An academic at the Queensland Conservatorium of Music Research Centre specialising in the fields of:

- Environmental sciences
- Ecological Impacts of Climate Change
- Electronic Media Art
- Music Composition

== Career ==
Leah Barclay primarily explores Biosphere Soundscapes and River Listening and raises environmental awareness utilising field recordings of endangered eco systems as a form of acoustic ecology in her compositions and sound walks.

== Works ==
- Riverlistening
- Biosphere listening
- 100 Ways to Listen Augmented Reality Soundwalks
