= Presto (song) =

Single by No Money Enterprise
- Released: 2 October 2020
- Length: 3:53
- Label: No Money Enterprise
- Songwriter(s): RB; Rndy OT $vge; Stallyon Junz; Tommy.OT; Frank van Rooijen
- Producer(s): Skwatta Boi

No Money Enterprise singles chronology
"No Reason" (2020)	"Presto" (2020)	"Troublesome" (2022)

Music video
- "Presto" on YouTube

"Presto" is a song by Samoan Australian hip hop group No Money Enterprise, independently released as a single on 2 October 2020.

"Presto" received a nomination in the Hip Hop / Rap category at the 2021 Queensland Music Awards.

== Background and release ==
"Presto" was released on 2 October 2020.

== Critical reception ==
Frank Tremain and Matthew Craig of AU Dollars commended the song, writing that No Money Enterprise "always deliver a strong presence and energy, none of which is lacking on latest drop, "Presto"." They also praised the group's "natural chemistry", with each of the members adding their own flavour to another banging beat."

== Awards and nominations ==
Queensland Music Award nominations for "Presto"
Year	Nominee / work	Award	Result	Ref.
2021	"Presto"	Hip Hop / Rap	Nominated	

== Music video ==
The music video for the song was directed by Carlin Leota and Kevin Bar.

== Live performances ==
No Money Enterprise performed "Presto" live at the 2021 Queensland Music Awards on 5 May 2021.

== Credits and personnel ==
Adapted from Spotify.

No Money Enterprise

- RB – performance, writing
- Rndy OT $vge – performance, writing
- Stallyon Junz – performance, writing
- Tommy.OT – performance, writing

Other musicians

- Frank van Rooijen – writing
- Skwatta Boi – production
