= No Reason (No Money Enterprise song) =

Single by No Money Enterprise
- Released: 1 May 2020
- Length: 3:24
- Label: No Money Enterprise
- Songwriter(s): RB; Rndy OT $vge; Stallyon Junz; Tommy.OT
- Producer(s): Ben Tripp

No Money Enterprise singles chronology
"German" (2019)	"No Reason" (2020)	"Presto" (2020)

Music video
- "No Reason" on YouTube

"No Reason" is a song by Samoan Australian hip hop group No Money Enterprise, release independently as a single on 1 May 2020.

The follow-up to their debut single "German", the song features similar brass instrumentation to its predecessor. "No Reason" peaked at number 18 on the NZ Hot Singles Chart.

== Background and release ==
"No Reason" is No Money Enterprise's second single, following the release of their debut single "German", which achieved commercial success and gained traction on social media application TikTok. "No Reason" was released for digital download and streaming on 1 May 2020.

Discussing the track, Randy OT $vge stated that "No Reason" was about "where we see ourselves future-wise. 2020 we believe is the takeover for us."

== Critical reception ==
"No Reason" was a "hugely anticipated follow-up" to "German".

A writer for Triple J felt the song had "the same brass-filled energy and punchy beats" as "German", whilst adding a "darker side". Australian hip hop publication AU Dollars listed the song's third verse as an honourable mention in its mid-year list of the best Australian hip hop verses of 2020.

== Commercial performance ==
"No Reason" debuted and peaked at number 18 on the NZ Hot Singles Chart for the chart dated 10 May 2020, before falling out the following week.

== Credits and personnel ==
Adapted from Spotify.

No Money Enterprise

- RB – performance, writing
- Rndy OT $vge – performance, writing
- Stallyon Junz – performance, writing
- Tommy.OT – performance, writing

Other musicians

- Ben Tripp – production

== Charts ==
Weekly chart performance for "No Reason"
Chart (2020)	Peak position
New Zealand Hot Singles (RMNZ)	18
