= German (song) =

Single by No Money Enterprise
- Released: 1 November 2019
- Genre: Drill; Latin
- Length: 3:54
- Label: No Money Enterprise

No Money Enterprise singles chronology
"German" (2019)	"No Reason" (2020)

Music video
- "German" on YouTube

For the 2018 British hit, see EO (rapper).

"German" is the debut single by Australian hip hop group No Money Enterprise, released on 1 November 2019.

"German" peaked at number 37 on the ARIA Singles Chart and number 26 on the New Zealand Singles Chart, and received a nomination for Most Performed Hip Hop / Rap Work at the 2021 APRA Music Awards.

== Critical reception ==
Tommy Faith of Triple J Unearthed said of the song: "These boys have a serious future ahead of them if they can keep dropping heaters like "German". The beat puts them in a different lane to plenty of the blossoming drill artists coming through right now and it’s the perfect oil slick for them to flow over."

== Commercial performance ==
"German" peaked at number 37 on the ARIA Singles Chart and at number 26 on the New Zealand Singles Chart. It was certified gold in both countries.

== Awards and nominations ==
APRA Award nominations for "German"
Year	Nominee / work	Award	Result	Ref.
2021	"German"	Most Performed Hip Hop / Rap Work	Nominated	

== Live performances ==
On 26 November 2021, No Money Enterprise performed "German" alongside their cover of the Notorious B.I.G.'s song "Mo Money Mo Problems" for Australian youth broadcaster Triple J's Like a Version segment.

== Track listings ==
Digital download
No.	Title	Length
1.	"German"	3:54

Digital download – Radio edit
No.	Title	Length
1.	"German" (Radio Edit)	3:54

== Charts ==
=== Weekly charts ===
Weekly chart performance for "German"
Chart (2019–2020)	Peak position
Australia (ARIA)	37
New Zealand (Recorded Music NZ)	26

=== Year-end charts ===
Year-end chart performance for "German"
Chart (2020)	Position
Australian Artist (ARIA)	24

== Certifications ==
Region	Certification	Certified units/sales
Australia (ARIA)	Platinum	70,000^{‡}
New Zealand (RMNZ)	Gold	15,000^{‡}
^{‡} Sales+streaming figures based on certification alone.
