= Jane Sheldon =

Australian soprano

Jane Sheldon is a Sydney-born Australian soprano, largely based in New York City. She is an artistic associate at Sydney Chamber Opera.

Eliza Aria from Elena Kats-Chernin's ballet Wild Swans was first recorded by Sheldon in 2004 with the Tasmanian Symphony Orchestra. This recording was used in a series of television and cinema advertisements for British bank Lloyds TSB, and then as the theme music for Phillip Adams' ABC Radio National programme Late Night Live. It was nominated for Best Classical Album at the 2005 ARIA Awards.

For several years, Sheldon sang as part of the touring ensemble for composer John Zorn, performing his music at the Louvre, the Barbican, Lincoln Center Festival, Adelaide Festival, North Sea Jazz, Jazz Fest Sarajevo, November Music, the Metropolitan Museum, the Cloisters, and the Guggenheim, inside James Turrell's Aten Reign.

In 2018, Sheldon performed in the premiere of Damien Ricketson's wordless opera The Howling Girls, directed by Adena Jacobs at Carriageworks. In 2019, Sydney Chamber Opera presented the work at the Tokyo Festival.

In 2019, she gave the Australian premiere of Kaija Saariaho's La Passion de Simone at Sydney Festival with Sydney Chamber Opera and the Song Company.

Her 2022 album, I am a tree, I am a mouth was listed in The New Yorker's notable performances and recordings of 2022. In 2022 Sheldon was awarded Work of the Year (Dramatic) for composition at the Art Music Awards.

== Personal life ==
Sheldon is married to philosopher Peter Godfrey-Smith.

== Discography ==
Title	Details
Song of the Angel (with Sinfonia Australis and Cantillation)	CD, digital; released 2002, re-released 2012; Label: ABC Classics (4725972)
Elena Kats-Chernin: Wild Swans (with Ola Rudner, Tasmanian Symphony Orchestra)	CD, digital: released 2004; Label: ABC Classics (4767639)
North + South: Ten Folk Songs (with Genevieve Lang and Acacia Quartet)	CD, digital; released: November 2012; Label: Phosphor Records (PR0001)
Nature (with Nicole Panizza, piano)	CD, digital; released: May 2014; Label: Phosphor Records (PR0002)
Chiaroscuro (with Zubin Kanga, piano)	CD, digital; released: August 2015; Label: Phosphor Records (PR0003)
There Was a Man Lived in the Moon Nursery rhymes and children's songs, arranged by Andrew Ford, with Teddy Tahu Rhodes (baritone)	CD; released 2015; Label: ABC Classics (4812235)
Crossing (with Julian Curwin)	CD, digital; released: April 2018; Label: Romero Records
I am a tree, I am a mouth	Digital release: October 2022; Label: Phosphor Records (PR0004)

== ARIA Music Awards ==
Her recordings have twice been nominated for the ARIA Award for Best Classical Album: in 2005 for Elena Kats-Chernin: Wild Swans and in 2013 for the album North + South which was recorded with Genevieve Lang (harp) and the Acacia Quartet.

The ARIA Music Awards is an annual awards ceremony that recognises excellence, innovation, and achievement across all genres of Australian music. They commenced in 1987.

Year	Nominee / work	Award	Result	Ref.
2005	Wild Swans	Best Classical Album	Nominated	
2013	North + South	Best Classical Album	Nominated	
