= Mary Finsterer =

Australian composer and academic

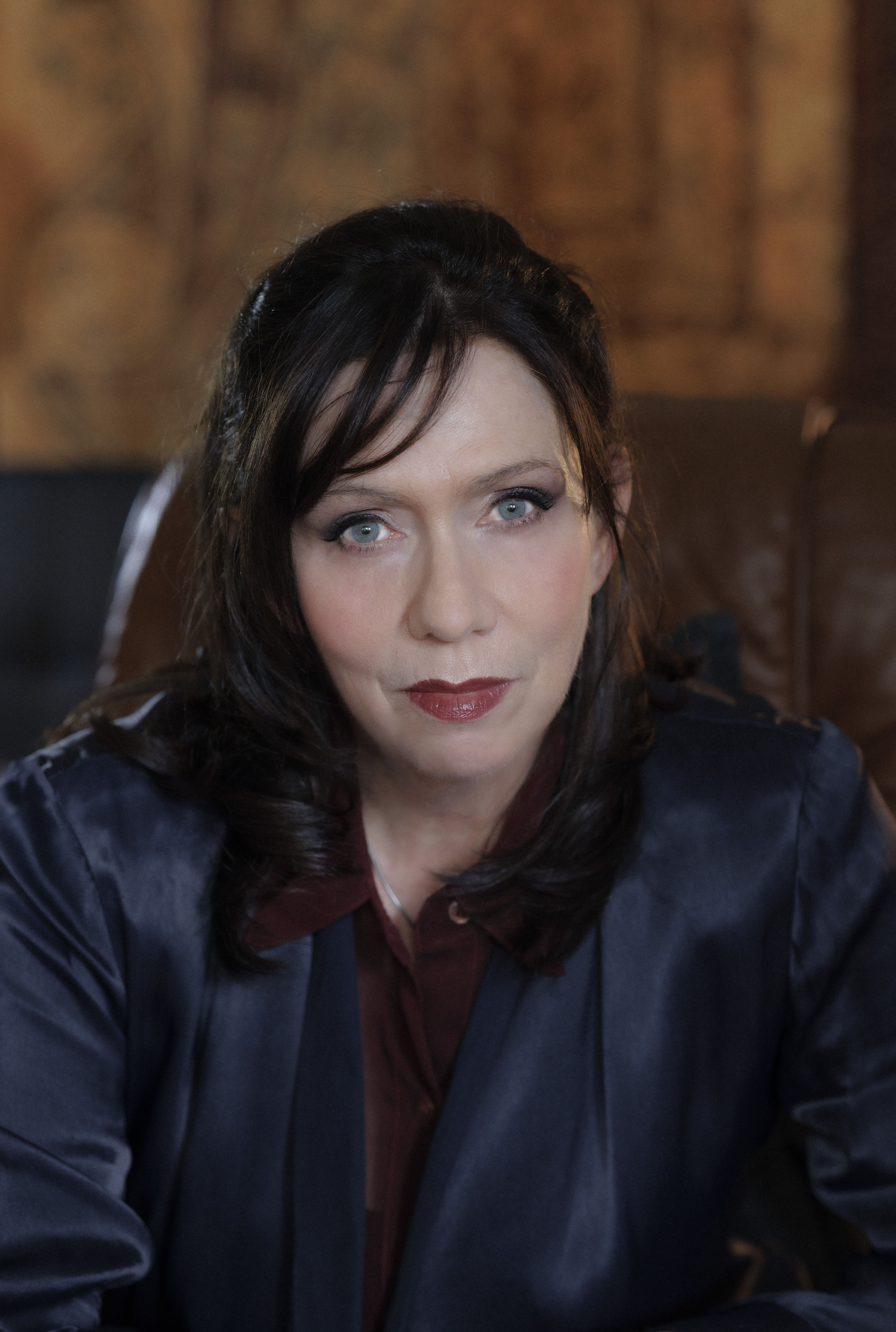
Mary Finsterer in 2022 (photograph by Dean Golja)

Mary Finsterer (born 25 August 1962) is an Australian composer and academic.

== Life ==
Finsterer was born in Canberra in 1962. She graduated in 1987 with a Bachelor of Music degree from the University of Melbourne. A recipient of the Royal Netherlands Government Award in 1993, she continued her studies in Amsterdam with Louis Andriessen, then returned to Australia and studied with Brenton Broadstock, completing a Master of Music degree in 1995 at the University of Melbourne. She completed a Doctor of Philosophy degree in 2003. In 2006 she received a Churchill Fellowship for her continuing work in multimedia. Finsterer is married to the photographer Dean Golja.

Since 2007 Finsterer has completed a body of work that includes In Praise of Darkness, a major orchestral work for the Dutch ensemble Asko/Schönberg in association with Tura Music, a violin duo for soloists Natsuko Yoshimoto and James Cuddeford, a string quartet for the Goldner String Quartet, a chamber work for the Sydney Soloists, and a number of works for her 2009 composer-in-residence position at the Campbelltown Performing Arts Centre.

Her orchestral fanfare Afmaeli was the opening piece for the 70th birthday celebrations of composer Louis Andriessen at the Holland Festival in 2009. In the same year Finsterer was the winner of the Paul Lowin Orchestral Prize for her new work In Praise of Darkness.

Finsterer has taught music and composition at Duquesne University in Pittsburgh, the University of Montreal in Canada, the University of Wollongong, the Victorian College of the Arts, the Sydney Conservatorium of Music, the University of Sydney and the Australian Film, Television and Radio School where she became an honorary research fellow in 2009. Finsterer is a Vice-Chancellor's Professorial Fellow at Monash University and in July 2014 she was announced as the inaugural Chamber Music Australia Chair of Composition at Monash University to teach there until 2017. She currently holds the position of CALE Creative Fellow at the College of Arts, Law and Education at the University of Tasmania whilst working on large-scale works. Her works have been performed internationally.

Finsterer has composed for films and electroacoustic events for the Music Biennale Zagreb, Nouvel Ensemble Moderne, Ensemble intercontemporain, and Ictus Ensemble for performances in Lille and Brussels. She worked as an orchestrator on the 2007 film Die Hard 4.0. Her film music for the 2010 feature film South Solitary received a Film Critics Circle of Australia nomination in 2010, and has since been released on the CD label ABC Classics.

Her first opera, Biographica, to a libretto by Tom Wright, about the life of Gerolamo Cardano, premiered in January 2017 at the Sydney Festival with the Sydney Chamber Opera at the Carriageworks. Her second opera, Antarctica, also to a libretto by Wright, was first performed at Muziekgebouw aan 't IJ in Amsterdam for the Holland Festival 2022 and Sydney Festival 2023 in a co-production with Sydney Chamber Opera.

Finsterer is published by Schott Music.

Finsterer's Stabat Mater (2023) won two APRA|AMCOS Art Music Awards in 2024 – Work of the Year: Choral and Performance of the Year: Notated Composition.

== Honours and awards ==
- APRA|AMCOS Art Music Award for Work of the Year: Choral 2024 for Stabat Mater
- APRA|AMCOS Art Music Award for Performance of the Year: Notated Composition 2024 for Stabat Mater
- Composer-in-residence with Melbourne Symphony Orchestra, 2023
- APRA|AMCOS Art Music Award for Instrumental Work 2019 for Ignis
- APRA|AMCOS Art Music Award for Vocal Work 2018 for Biographica
- APRA|AMCOS Art Music Award for Instrumental Work 2014 for Aerea
- Paul Lowin Orchestral Prize 2009 for In Praise of Darkness
- Churchill Fellowship 2006 for work in the film industry
- Australia Council Composer Fellowship, 1998
- Royal Netherlands Government Award 1993
- Composer-in-residence with Sydney Symphony Orchestra, 1992
- Music Lives!, Pittsburgh, 1992
- Paris Rostrum Prize, 1992
- Le Nouvel Ensemble Moderne's Forum 91
- Albert H. Maggs Composition Award 1990 for Catch
- "Let's Celebrate Oz Music" ABC Award 1989

== Works ==
Selected works include:

- Ruisselant (1991) (Note: Released on double-CD Catch (2004), ABC Classics)
- Catch (1992)
- Nextwave Fanfare (1992)
- Omaggio Alla Pieta (1992)
- Tract, for cello (1993)
- Constans (1995)
- Nyx (1996)
- Ether (1998)
- Achos (1999)
- Kurz (2000)
- Pascal's Sphere (2000)
- Sequi (2001)
- Sleep (2002)
- Afmaeli (2009)
- In Praise of Darkness (2009)
- Ionia (2009)
- South Solitary (2010), film score (released on CD South Solitary by ABC Classics)
- Antea (2012)
- Falling (2012)
- Silva (2012)
- Aerea (2013)
- Lake Ice: Missed Tales No. 1 (2013) for double bass and orchestra
- Biographica (2017), opera
- Antarctica (2022), opera
- Stabat Mater (2023)
