= Leichhardt Espresso Chorus =

Choir in Sydney, Australia

Background information
- Also known as: LEC
- Origin: Sydney, Australia
- Genres: Choral music, Contemporary Australian art music
- Occupation: Choir
- Instrument: ca. 80 voices
- Years active: 1998–present
- Members: Musical Director; Michelle Leonard; Accompanist; Benjamin Burton
- Website: http://www.espressochorus.com.au

Leichhardt Espresso Chorus is Sydney’s contemporary choir, specialising in Australian art music for choir and orchestra. The choir has participated in the world premiere of 200 new compositions since 2002, having commissioned (or co-commissioned) 170 of these. Since its inception in 1998, LEC has prospered under the leadership of Artistic Director Michelle Leonard and has redefined the capacity of community choirs. They have collaborated with many other performers, such as Edinburgh Military Tattoo, and are the artist-in-residence at the Moorambilla Festival in New South Wales. In 2008 the chorus received the "Best Community Outreach" award in the inaugural Music in Communities Awards by the Music Council of Australia.

== Background ==
Based in Sydney's inner-west Leichhardt Municipality, the choir comprises over 80 singers, and performs three major concerts a year. Under the artistic direction of conductor Michelle Leonard OAM, the choir strives to stretch the boundaries of excellence in community music but does not restrict membership through auditions. LEC promotes choral music in its community, which includes strong links with western NSW and a tradition of mentoring children's choirs through joint projects. LEC also fosters new Australian choral music by commissioning local composers to produce new works and new arrangements of classics for particular events.

LEC collaborates with Australian soloists in producing its major concerts. Recent soloists include Craig Everingham (baritone), Paul Goodchild (trumpet), Simon Halligan (baritone), Christina Leonard (soprano saxophone), Billie McCarthy (vocalist), Nadia Piave (vocalist), Jane Sheldon (soprano), Dan Walker (tenor), Sally Whitwell (piano) and Narelle Yeo (soprano).

Significant recent collaborations with professional arts groups include:

- 2010: Edinburgh Military Tattoo in Sydney and broadcast on FOX TV;
- 2009: Love, Lust and Longing radio broadcast on the Australian Broadcasting Corporation’s Sunday Live;
- 2007: Stomp, (supporting the Lost and Found Orchestra), Sydney Festival;
- 2007: Singing the Space, official opening of the Performance Space, Carriageworks; and
- 2007: Lulie the Iceberg, with Kageboushi Theatre Company, Sydney Theatre Company.

Each December, LEC produces Carols on Norton, a free community Christmas concert staged in Pioneers Memorial Park, Leichhardt.

LEC also features Ristretto, a chamber choir.

== Awards ==
- 2006: New South Wales runner-up, ABC Classic FM Choir of the Year Award
- 2008: "Best Community Outreach", Music in Communities Awards, Music Council of Australia

== Commissioned works ==
The Leichhardt Express Chorus is committed to the development of new Australian choral music. This involves commissioning new music and updated arrangements of classics for particular events (such as re-workings of traditional carols for the Carols on Norton Concerts).

Between 2002 and 2011 the choir commissioned or co-commissioned 53 new songs (as listed below) and 23 new arrangements (indicated by + in the list below). As part of its role as choir-in-residence at the annual Moorambilla Festival, LEC has also participated in the premiere of an additional 14 new songs and 1 new arrangement that were commissioned for that Festival.

| Premiere | Composer/arranger | Name |
|---|---|---|
| 2010 | | |
| 27 March | Luke Byrne | Such Country suite (5 movements) |
| | David Basden | The Birds |
| | Andrew Schultz | Simplify, Simplify |
| 18 Sept | Gerard Brophy | Moorambilla Dawn |
| | David Basden | Ave Maria |
| 2009 | | |
| 22 March | Luke Byrne | Immortal Beloved |
| | Sally Whitwell | She Walks in Beauty |
| | Sally Whitwell | The Song of the Wandering Aengus |
| 5 July | Luke Byrne | Salmos de Santiago |
| 26 Sept | Luke Byrne | Back in My Day |
| | Elena Kats-Chernin | Baiaime's Ngunhhu suite (6 movements) |
| 20 Dec | Dan Walker | What Can You See? |
| 2008 | | |
| 5 April | Dan Walker | Seven Deadly Sins suite (7 movements) |
| 21 Dec | Billie McCarthy | I Love Christmas |
| | Sally Whitwell | Lute Book Lullaby |
| | Sally Whitwell | Hodie Christus Natus Est |
| 2007 | | |
| 6 May | Dan Walker | + Weep No More (David Childs) |
| 25 Aug | Christopher Gordon | You Dead Kings Rising |
| | Marco Creazzo | Beyond the Sea |
| | Meredith Hope | Deep Waters Rising |
| 16 Dec | Billie McCarthy | Almost Christmas Day |
| 2006 | | |
| 17 Dec | Billie McCarthy | Billie's Song |
| | Marco Creazzo | + The First Christmas |
| 2005 | | |
| 17 Sep | Dan Walker | Coutts Crossing |
| | Michelle Leonard* | Across The Plains (*Arranged: Marco Creazzo) |
| | Paul Jarman | Ride The Spirit (Co-commissioned with Coonamble Shire Council) |
| | Michelle Leonard | + Bellambi (Matthew Doyle) |
| | Michelle Leonard | + Drought/Paint Up (Matthew Doyle) |
| | Michelle Leonard | + Shall We Dream (Michael Atherton) |
| | Michelle Leonard and Marco Creazzo | + Sailing In The Boat (Trad) |
| | Michelle Leonard and Marco Creazzo | + Din Din Din (Trad) |
| 23 Sep | Paul Jarman | Narrabri (Co-commissioned with Narrabri Shire Council) |
| 2004 | | |
| 4 Jul | Marco Creazzo | Ave Maria |
| 12 Sep | Joe Accario | Volo del Palazzo |
| | Marco Creazzo | + Ride On (Christy Moore) |
| 2003 | | |
| | Christia Mimmochi | Silence is the Rock |
| 27 Sep | Dan Walker | Freshwater suite (4 movements) |
| 21 Dec | Marco Creazzo | + Away in a Manger |
| | Marco Creazzo | + Carol of the Drum |
| | Marco Creazzo | + Christmas Day |
| | Marco Creazzo | + Ding Dong Merrily on High |
| | Marco Creazzo | + Gabriel's Message |
| | Marco Creazzo | + God Rest Ye Merry Gentlemen |
| | Marco Creazzo | + Good King Wenceslas |
| | Marco Creazzo | + Huon Christmas Carol |
| | Marco Creazzo | + Mary's Boy Child |
| | Marco Creazzo | + Noel Nouvelet |
| | Marco Creazzo | + Once In Royal David's City |
| | Marco Creazzo | + Silent Night |
| | Marco Creazzo | + Star Carol |
| | Marco Creazzo | + The Silver Stars |
| | Marco Creazzo | + We Three Kings of Orient Are |
| 2002 | | |
| 15 Sep | Paul Jarman | Outback suite (5 movements) |

+ A new arrangement of an existing work

== Additional world premiere works ==
As of March 2011, LEC has participated in the world premier of 91 new compositions. In addition to the 76 listed in the table above, the choir participated in the world premiere performance of a further 15 works that were commissioned for the Moorambilla Festival. These are listed in the following table.

| Premiere | Composer/arranger | Name | Commissioned by |
|---|---|---|---|
| 2010 | | | |
| 18 Sep | Dan Walker | Guardians of the Gorge suite (2 of the 3 movements) | Moorambilla Voices |
| 2009 | | | |
| 26 Sep | Dan Walker | Yowie! suite (2 of the 4 movements) | Moorambilla Festival |
| | Ben Van Tienan | Find My Way | Moorambilla Festival |
| 2007 | | | |
| 14 Sep | Dan Walker | Songs in the Key of She suite (3 of the 5 movements) | Festivals Australia |
| 2006 | | | |
| 16 Sep | Dan Walker | Songs in the Key of Bloke suite (3 of the 6 movements) | Festivals Australia |
| | Marco Creazzo | + Love Me Sweet (Carl Vine) | Moorambilla Festival |
| 2003 | | | |
| 14 Sep | Marco Creazzo | Moorambilla suite (3 movements) | Moorambilla Festival |

+ A new arrangement of an existing work
