= No Money Enterprise =

Samoan Australian hip-hop group

- Origin: Logan City, Queensland, Australia
- Genres: Hip hop; drill
- Years active: 2019–present
- Labels: Wembley; The Orchard; No Money Enterprise; (independent)
- Members: Rndy $vge; Tommy OT
- Website: nomoneyenterprise.com

No Money Enterprise (often abbreviated as NME) are a Samoan Australian hip hop group formed in 2019 in Logan City, Queensland, consisting of members Rndy Svge & Tommy OT. Their musical style incorporates elements of drill music and hip hop. They are best known for their debut single "German".

No Money Enterprise have received multiple award nominations—"German" receiving a nomination for Most Performed Hip Hop / Rap Work at the 2021 APRA Awards and "Presto" was nominated in the Hip Hop / Rap category at the 2021 Queensland Music Awards.

== Career ==
=== 2019–present: "German" and "No Reason" ===
No Money Enterprise formed in Logan City, Queensland in 2019. The group rose to prominence in November 2019 with the release of their debut single "German". The song gained traction on the social media app TikTok. On 1 May 2020, they released the single "No Reason". On 17 June, No Money Enterprise signed with booking agency New World Artists. On 2 October, they released the single "Presto". On 8 April 2021, "Presto" received a nomination in the Hip Hop / Rap category at the 2021 Queensland Music Awards. On 26 November 2021, they performed a cover of the Notorious B.I.G.'s song "Mo Money Mo Problems" for Australian youth broadcaster Triple J's Like a Version segment, in addition to a performance of their song "German". The cover was digitally released the following week, on 3 December 2021. Australian popular culture website Junkee's David James Young ranked the cover at number 32 out of 38 in his list of the best Like a Version covers of 2021, noting that "[the] Biggie classic doesn't quite meld with the Enterprise's style." On 25 February 2022, they released the single "Troublesome", a collaboration with rap group Section 60 and Bently. On 19 March, they released the single "Riding", a collaboration with musician Bently. On 30 March, they premiered the single "Bosque" on Triple J's program Good Nights with Bridget Hustwaite. "Bosque", featuring Bently, Vita and Redback, was subsequently released later that day.

== Band members ==
Current members

- Rndy $vge – vocals (2019–present)
- Tommy OT – vocals (2019–present)

== Personal lives ==
Each of the band members have Polynesian heritage. In an interview with Triple J about the success of "German", Rndy $vge said:

"Not only do we represent Australia, we also want to represent our Polynesian background. We take pride in it, it's something we carry close to our hearts. We live and breathe where we come from and we want to showcase that."

— Rndy $vge

== Musical style and influences ==
No Money Enterprise's musical style incorporates genres such as hip hop and drill.

== Discography ==
=== Extended plays ===
List of EPs, with release date, formats, and label shown
Title	Details
Woodrich	Released: 3 February 2023; Format: Digital download, streaming; Label: Wembley

=== Singles ===
List of singles, with year released, selected chart positions and certifications, and album name shown
Title	Year	Peak chart positions		Certifications	Album
Title	Year	AUS	NZ	Certifications	Album
"German"	2019	37	26	ARIA: Platinum; RMNZ: Gold	Non-album singles
"No Reason"	2020	—	— (Note: "No Reason" did not enter the NZ Top 40 Singles Chart, but peaked at number 18 on the NZ Hot Singles Chart.)		Non-album singles
"Presto"	2020	—	—		Non-album singles
"Troublesome" (with Bently and Section 60)	2022	— (Note: "Troublesome" did not enter the ARIA Singles Chart, but peaked at number 20 on the ARIA Top 20 Australian Hip Hop/R&B Singles Chart.)	— (Note: "Troublesome" did not enter the NZ Top 40 Singles Chart, but peaked at number 28 on the NZ Hot Singles Chart.)		Woodrich
"Riding" (with Bently)	2022	—	—		Non-album single
"Bosque" (featuring Bently, Vita and Redback)	2022	—	—		Woodrich
"S T C" (featuring Vita)	2022	—	—		Woodrich
"Mamacita" / "Suave"	2022	—	—		Non-album single
"Foreign Currency" (featuring Vita and Stal'lyon)	2022	—	—		Woodrich
"LLTK"	2023	—	—		Non-album singles
"Cleopatra" (with SHYY)	2023	—	—		Non-album singles
"Through the Storm" (featuring Bently)	2024	—	—		Non-album singles
"Back to Back"	2024	—	—		Non-album singles
"Jump"	2025	—	—		Non-album singles
"—" denotes a single that did not chart or was not released in that territory.

==== Promotional singles ====
List of promotional singles, with year released and album name shown
Title	Year	Album
"Mo Money Mo Problems" (Triple J Like a Version)	2021	Non-album single

== Awards and nominations ==
=== APRA Awards ===
The APRA Awards are several award ceremonies run in Australia by the Australasian Performing Right Association (APRA) to recognise composing and song writing skills, sales and airplay performance by its members annually.

Year	Nominee / work	Award	Result	abbr. Ref.
2021	"German"	Most Performed Hip Hop / Rap Work	Nominated	

=== Queensland Music Awards ===
Year	Nominee / work	Award	Result	Ref.
2021	"Presto"	Hip Hop / Rap	Nominated	
