= Speak Percussion =

Australian percussion ensemble

- Origin: Melbourne, Victoria, Australia
- Years active: <2000–present
- Members: Eugene Ughetti
- Past members: Minako Okamoto; Justin Marshall; Rory McDougall; Harry Arvanitis

Speak Percussion are an Australian percussion ensemble led by artistic directors, Eugene Ughetti and Kaylie Melville.

== History ==
The original five members, including Ughetti, came together in 1999, to join a recital by Minako Okamoto while they were undergraduate students at the University of Melbourne's Victorian College of the Arts. The following year, they formed Speak Percussion and made their debut at Musica Viva's Ménage music nights at Chapel off Chapel. Later that year the line-up of Okamoto, Ughetti, Justin Marshall and Rory McDougall performed Fritz Hauser's Double Exposition.

In 2002, the group split up due to financial and creative strain, with Ughetti the only one wishing to continue. Since then they have operated as a collective, with an ever-changing lineup.

== Activities ==
Since forming, the ensemble has commissioned over 200 works and collaborated with Oren Ambarchi, Anthony Pateras, Jon Rose, Ethel, and glass artist Elaine Miles. In 2018, Norwegian record label Sofa released Before Nightfall One, an album with Speak Percussion and Ingar Zach. This was followed by Percussion Works, an album with Thomas Meadowcroft released on Mode Records in 2020.

They have been nominated at the APRA's Art Music Awards each year from 2011 to 2017 and 2019–2021, and have won five awards between 2015 and 2021.

In 2021, Kaylie Melville became Speak Percussion's assistant Artistic Director.

In 2025, the group is the subject of a 25 year retrospective exhibition, Silent Hand Catches Silver Bell, at the Grainger Museum in Melbourne.

== Directors ==
- Eugene Ughetti – founding director
- Kaylie Melville – artistic director since 2021

== Members ==
- Eugene Ughetti – maracas, percussion, xylophone
- Minako Okomoto – glockenspiel (fl. 2000, 2002)
- Justin Marshall – vibraphone (fl. 2000-2002)
- Rory McDougall – marimba (fl. 2000, 2002)
- Harry Arvanitis – (fl. 2002)
- Ashley Hribar – prepared piano (fl. 2005)
- Peter Neville – tom-toms, wood-blocks, pod rattle (fl. 2005)
- Timothy Phillips – tom-toms, wood-blocks, pod rattle (fl. 2005)
- Kaylie Melville

== Discography ==
- Speak Percussion @ BMW Edge (live video album, 2005) – Contemporary Arts Media
- 2015 Sleepwalker’s Conviction, Oren Ambarchi featuring Speak Percussion (Black Truffle)
- 2018 Before Nightfall One, Speak Percussion with Ingar Zach (Sofa)
- 2020 Percussion Works, Speak Percussion with Thomas Meadowcroft (Mode Records)

== Awards ==
- 2012 Melbourne Fringe Festival Award, Best Music
- 2014 Green Room Award, Fluvial
- 2015 APRA Art Music Award, Victorian State Award for Excellence by and Organisation
- 2016 APRA Art Music Award, Excellence in Experimental Music
- 2017 APRA Art Music Award, Excellence by an Organisation
- 2019 APRA Art Music Award, Performance of the Year
- 2021 APRA Art Music Award, Luminary Award: Organisation (National)
