= Adena Jacobs =

Australian theatre director (born 1982)

Adena Jacobs (born June 1982) is an Australian theatre director. She has worked in Australian independent theatre with her company, Fraught Outfit, of which she is artistic director, and has also directed for various mainstage companies. She was "Female Director-in-Residence" at Malthouse Theatre, Melbourne in 2012, and in 2014–15 was Resident Director at Belvoir, Sydney.

Jacobs adapted the 1966 film Persona for theatrical performances at Theatre Works in Melbourne in 2012.

Jacobs graduated with a Bachelor of Creative Arts (honours) from Melbourne University (2004), and with a Masters of Theatre Practice from Victorian College of the Arts (2008) where she received the Yvonne Taylor scholarship for a female director. In 2011, Jacobs was awarded the Melbourne International Arts Festival’s Harold Mitchell Fellowship. She is a member of Lincoln Center Directors' Lab.

Jacobs is Jewish and has dual US-Australian citizenship. Her sister is singer-songwriter Ariela Jacobs. She is openly gay and her partner is actress Luisa Hastings Edge.
