= Carriageworks =

Multi-purpose arts venue in Sydney

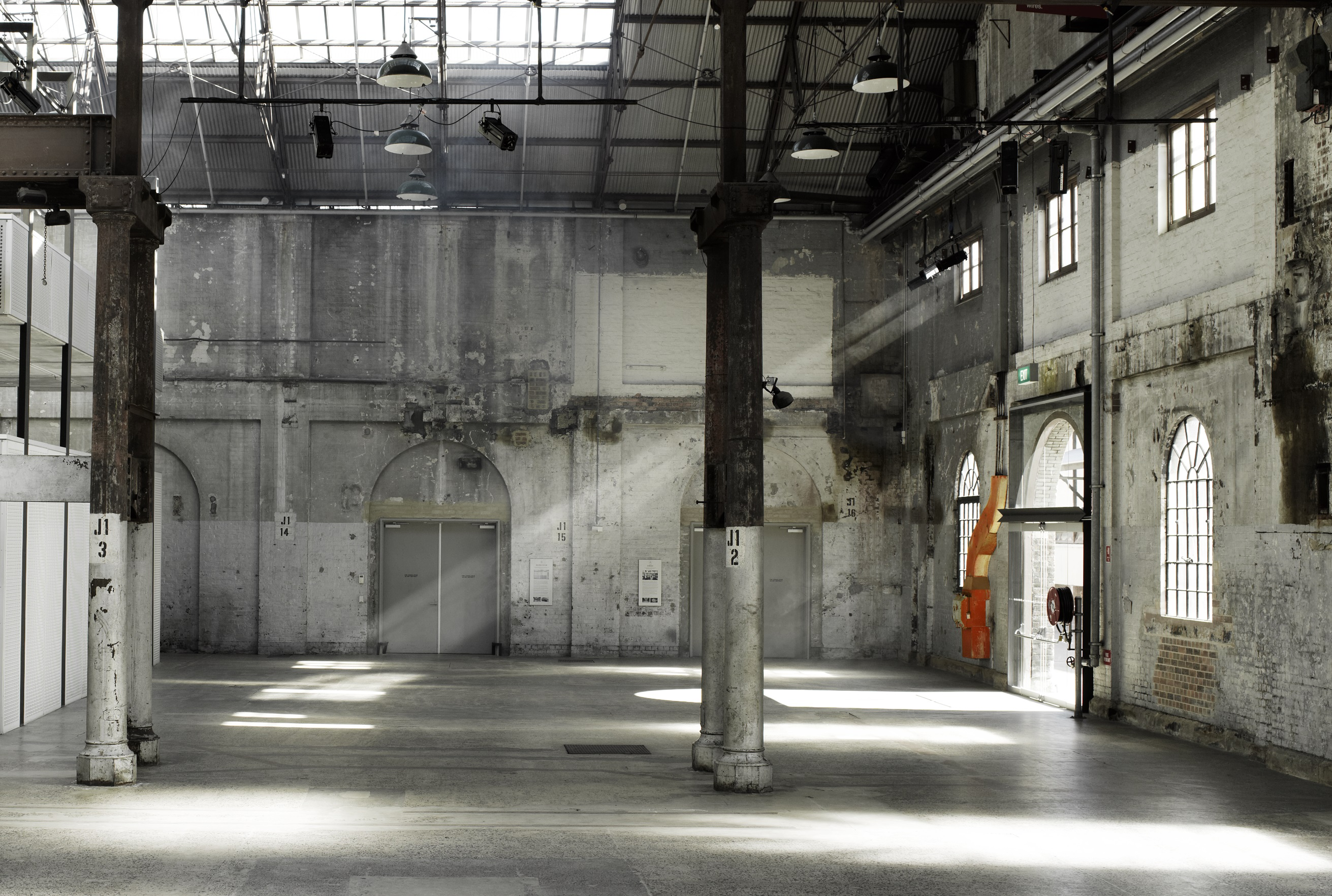
- Carriageworks' Public Space

- Location within Sydney
- Established: 1889
- Location: Redfern, New South Wales, Australia
- Coordinates: 33°53′39″S 151°11′30″E
- Type: Contemporary multi-arts including visual arts, dance, performance, music, film, food and design
- Visitors: 1,320,000 (2017)
- Website: carriageworks.com.au

Carriageworks is a multi-arts urban cultural precinct located at the former Eveleigh Carriage Workshops in Redfern, Sydney, Australia. Carriageworks showcases contemporary art and performing arts, as well as being used for filming, festivals, fairs and commercial exhibitions. The largest such venue in Australia, it is a cultural facility of the Government of New South Wales, and receives support from Create NSW and the federal government through the Australia Council for the Arts. The centre has commissioned new work by Australian and international artists, and has been home to eight theatre, dance and film companies, including Performance Space, Sydney Chamber Opera and Moogahlin Performing Arts, and a weekly farmers' market has operated there for many years.

On 4 May 2020, Carriageworks Limited, the company that operates the venue, entered voluntary administration and closed, citing an “irreparable loss of income” due to government bans on events during the COVID-19 pandemic, and the consequent negative impact on the arts sector. Carriageworks successfully emerged from voluntary administration and reopened its doors to the public in August 2020.

== History ==
The 51-hectare (130-acre) Eveleigh Rail Complex was built on the site between 1880 and 1889 and included the Eveleigh Carriage Workshops, part of which is occupied by Carriageworks. The railway workshops are very significant in the history of the New South Wales Government Railways, Australia's major rail network. Carriages for Sydney's expanding rail network were built and maintained within the building. They included the carriage constructed for the Governor General of Australia, also used by visiting royalty, the first electric carriage, and the first air-conditioned train in Australia. From 1973, production at the site declined due to its inefficient older buildings, restrictive union practices and increased privatisation of carriage construction. The workshop was closed in 1988.

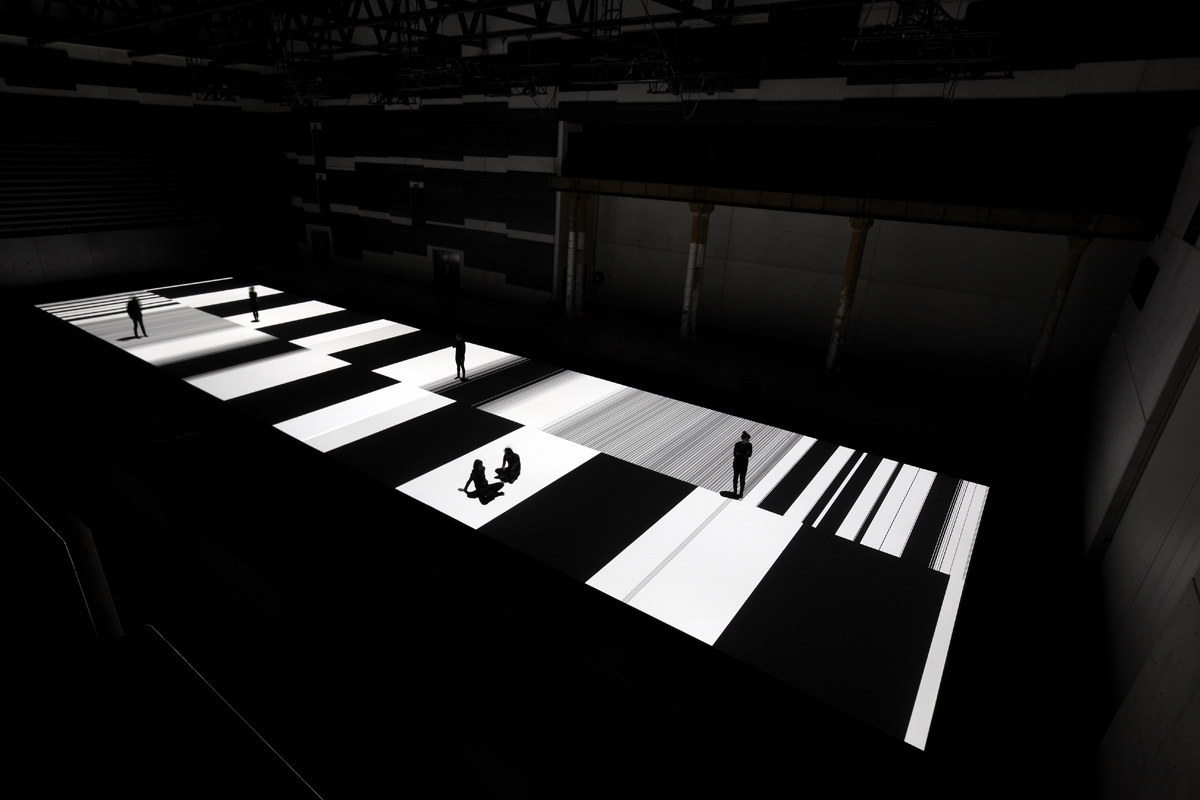
Ryoji Ikeda, test pattern [no.5], 2013, audiovisual installation at Carriageworks. Commissioned and presented by Carriageworks and ISEA2013 in collaboration with Vivid Sydney

In June 2002, the NSW Ministry for the Arts completed the purchase of the Carriage and Blacksmith Workshops at the Eveleigh site. Soon after, a construction project on the site commenced under the name of Carriageworks. Adaptive reuse of the workshop began in 2003 with the housing of numerous contemporary arts practitioners, and Carriageworks was officially opened in 2007. In 2008, the Australian Institute of Architects awarded Tonkin Zulaikha Greer with the AIA Architecture Award for the adaptive reuse of CarriageWorks, and the AIA Greenway Award for the heritage work.

In August 2013, the Carriageworks cultural precinct doubled in size, adding 5,000 square metres (54,000 sq ft) to its existing premises in Redfern. Major programs presented at Carriageworks in 2013 included Ryoji Ikeda's Test pattern (No 5) presented in association with Vivid Sydney 2013; FBi Radio's 10th birthday; and Australian Fashion Week.

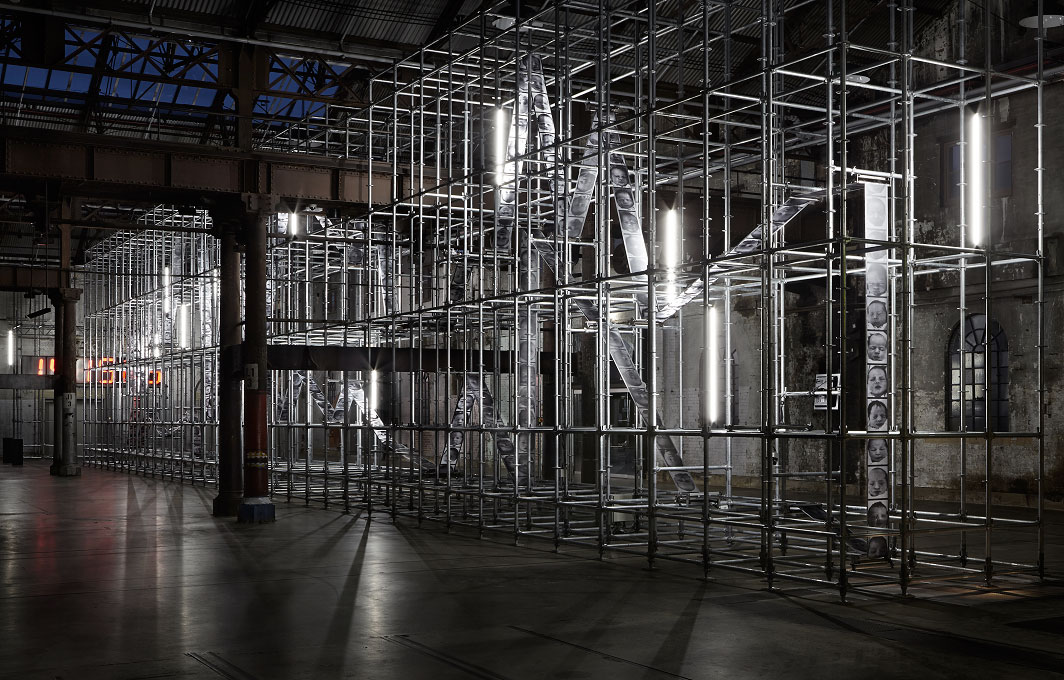
Christian Boltanski, Chance (detail), 2014, Carriageworks, Sydney

In 2014, Carriageworks presented Christian Boltanski's Chance; Ganesh Versus The Third Reich by Back to Back Theatre; Tehching Hsieh’s Time Clock Piece.

In 2015, exhibitions included Sydney Buddha by Zhang Huan, 24 Frames Per Second an exhibition of 24 screen-based works of 18 Australian and 6 international artists, Siamani Samoa by Michel Tuffery and the Royal Samoan Police Band, Ryoji Ikeda with Superposition, and Xavier Le Roy's Self Unfinished presented by Carriageworks and Kaldor Public Art Projects.

On 4 May 2020, the company operating the venue, Carriageworks Ltd, declared it would be entering voluntary administration and closing, citing an "irreparable loss of income" due to government bans on events during the COVID-19 pandemic and the consequent negative impact on the arts sector. Having appointed KPMG as voluntary administrators, the Carriageworks management and stakeholders began working together to explore possibilities for its future. Carriageworks was the first major arts venue in the country to cease operations during the pandemic. The Media, Entertainment and Arts Alliance called for an urgent rescue by the state government.

Carriageworks successfully emerged from administration and reopened its doors to the public in August 2020.

== Description ==
Carriageworks is Australia's largest contemporary multi-arts centre. It has been supported by the New South Wales Government, receiving funding through Create NSW, and also federal government through the Australia Council.

Its vision is "to be recognised as a multi-arts urban cultural precinct that engages and inspires Sydney's culturally diverse communities", and to that end has presented a varied, multi-disciplinary and multi-cultural program for many years which has attracted to up to 1.32 million visitors (2017). Carriageworks has commissioned Australian and international artists "to make monumental new work that intersects with contemporary ideas" and it has striven to reflect the diversity of the community in its exhibits and performances. The centre plays host to up to 100 projects a year, including contemporary theatre, dance, visual arts, music, film and fashion and corporate events.

The venue is managed by Carriageworks Ltd, which also manages Bays 22-24 (additional spaces available for hire). Carriageworks is a short-term tenant, with the property owned by the NSW government.

=== Governance ===
As of September 2021, the board consists of eight members and one observer, with Cass O'Connor as Chair. Art writer and curator Blair French became CEO in 2019.

Lisa Havilah was Director of Carriageworks from 2012 to December 2018, during which time she was responsible for its evolution into a multi-arts venue. She created partnerships with major events such as Sydney Festival, Vivid Sydney, and Australian Fashion Week, as well as expanding the program to include major food events, and visitor numbers grew from 110,000 in 2010, to 1.32 million in 2017.

== Funding ==
Between 2012 and 2018, Carriageworks only made a profit in one year. In 2018, the centre obtained A$3.8 million in government grants, with the rest of its A$7.8 million of income from sources such as donations and bequests and sales of goods and services. This model works when times are good, but not in times of crisis. Federal funds via the Australia Council have been falling steadily since 2013–4, especially that directed to individual companies and artists. While Carriageworks was listed in the April 2020 four-year funding round, the cap of A$500,000 means there is not nearly enough to maintain a "world-class, heritage-listed venue" as well as provide an ambitious program of commissions. Create NSW has been spending much more on arts buildings than programming in recent years, and the NSW Government did not swiftly announce and deliver bail-out support for the arts during the COVID-19 crisis, as did the South Australian, Victorian and New South Wales governments.

== The National ==
The National is a series of biennial survey exhibitions featuring contemporary artists, run as a partnership between the Art Gallery of New South Wales, Carriageworks and the Museum of Contemporary Art Australia (MCA) and held across the three venues. The inaugural edition was held in 2017.

== Artists and resident companies ==
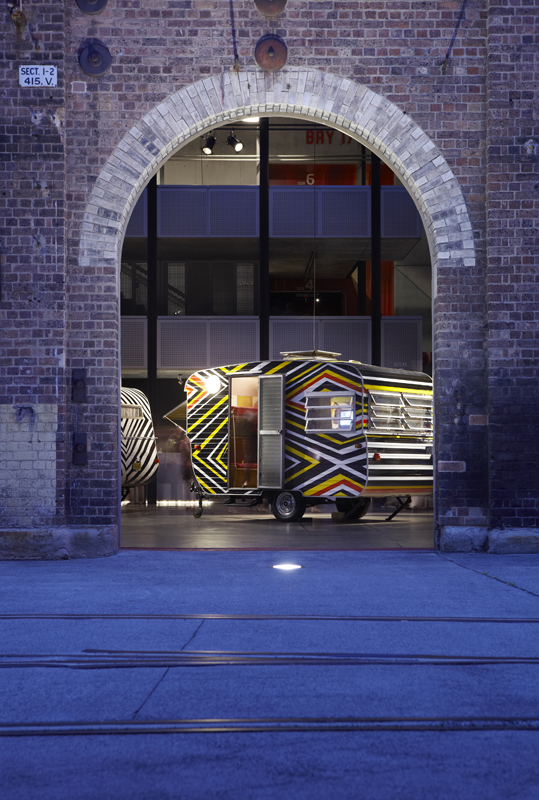
Andrew Brook, Travelling Colony (2012).

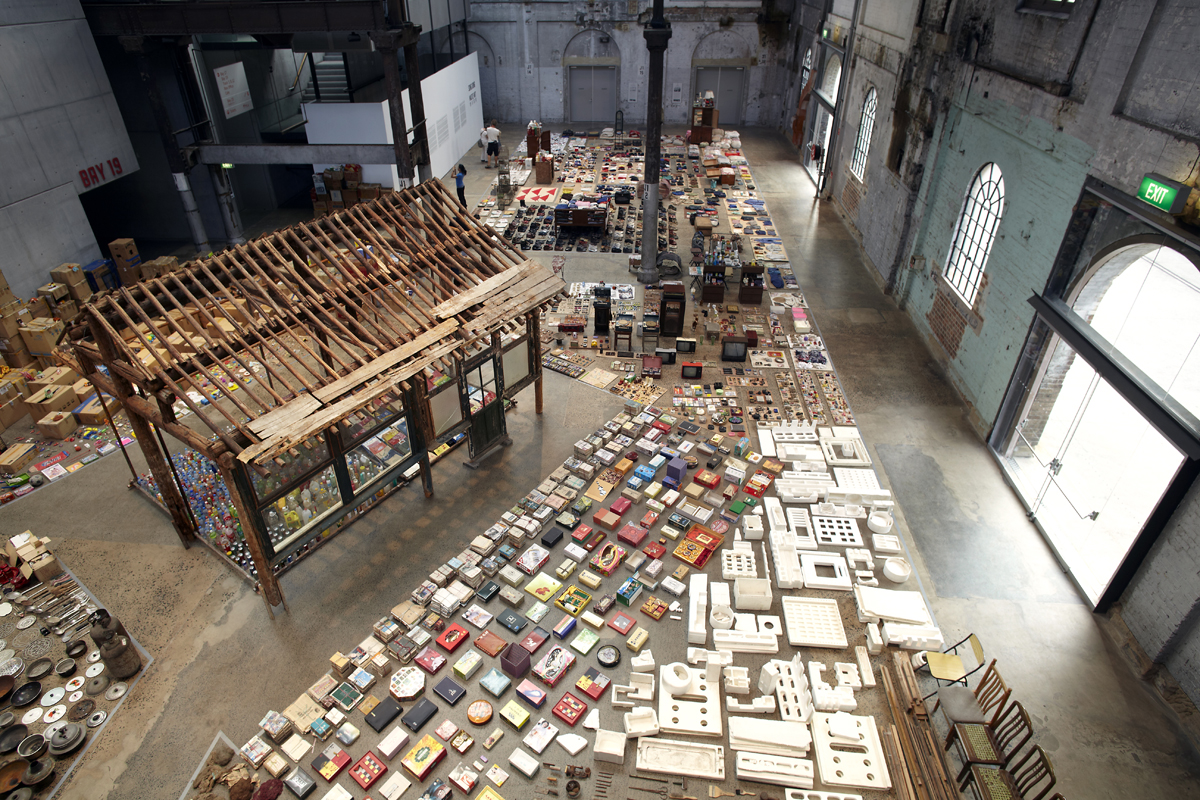
Song Dong, Waste Not (2013). Exhibition presented with 4A Centre for Contemporary Asian Art and Sydney Festival.

Many renowned Australian artists, including Tony Albert, Nell, JD Reforma and Wrong Solo (Agatha Gothe-Snape & Brian Fuata), have worked in Carriageworks' studio spaces.

A number of resident organisations, all working within the contemporary arts sector, used the space: Contemporary Asian Australian Performance, Erth, Sydney Chamber Opera, Force Majeure, Performance Space, Moogahlin, Felix Media, and Marrugeku.

=== Erth ===
Erth have been producing visual theatre since the 1990, including puppetry-based productions and community projects. The company is inspired by natural history, Indigenous Australian folklore, sociology and urban mythology. They have produced long-running shows such as Erth’s Dinosaur Zoo and Erth's Prehistoric Aquarium, as well as new shows. The Liminal Hour and Winter Camp at Barangaroo for were commissioned for Vivid Sydney in 2018 and 2019.

=== Force Majeure ===
Established in 2002 by artistic director Kate Champion and now led by Danielle Micich, Force Majeure produces dance theatre works, a combination of dance and storytelling. Apart from producing new works, the company trains and mentors both established artists and the next generation through their INCITE program.

=== Moogahlin Performing Arts ===
Moogahlin Performing Arts is an Aboriginal theatre company formed in Redfern in 2007, by a group of Aboriginal performing artists and community workers to honour the late Kevin Smith's request and in memory of the founding members of the Black Theatre. The company was incorporated in 2009, hosted by the Redfern Community Centre and Gadigal Information Service becoming a resident company of Carriageworks. Moogahlin works closely with emerging and established Aboriginal theatre practitioners and communities.

In 2012 the company performed a play-reading of Bob Merritt's 1975 play The Cake Man, presented by the Sydney Festival and Carriageworks] in association with the Australian Broadcasting Corporation, and on 16 January 2015 Moogahlin did a reprise at Eora College (which was founded by Merritt) in Redfern to mark the 40th anniversary of the play.

=== Performance Space ===
Performance Space is an organisation for the development and presentation of interdisciplinary arts and experimental theatre, established in 1983.

=== Sydney Chamber Opera ===
Established in 2010 by artistic director Louis Garrick and music director Jack Symonds, the Sydney Chamber Opera is noted for innovative programming, musical rigour and focus on theatre-making.

=== Marrugeku ===
Marrugeku is a dance company led by co-artistic directors choreographer/dancer Dalisa Pigram and director/dramaturg Rachael Swain, who have worked together for 23 years. The company has Indigenous and non-Indigenous Australians working together to create new dance dance performances, working from both Broome in Western Australia, and Carriageworks.

Between 2015 and 2018, the company toured Cut The Sky, featuring singer Ngaire Pigram around the world. The play, described as "mix[ing] contemporary and traditional music, poetry, contemporary dance and visual media", was created by collaborators from Australia, West Africa, Belgium, Papua New Guinea, and India. The play was based on an historic Aboriginal land rights protest, and featured poems by Edwin Lee Mulligan and songs by singer-songwriters Ngaiire, Nick Cave, and Buffalo Springfield, which were sung by Pigram.

On 9 December 2022 Marrugeku released a music video of a remake of Childish Gambino's 2018 song "This Is America", called "This Is Australia", with vocals led by Noongar rapper Beni Bjah. The song features many local references, and criticises Australia's treatment of refugees, Aboriginal and Torres Strait Islander people, and migrants. Their show Jurrungu Ngan-ga (Straight Talk) toured around the Kimberley region in Western Australia during the COVID-19 pandemic, and "This Is Australia" was shot there later, at Fitzroy Crossing, on Bunuba country. Jurrungu Ngan-ga is scheduled to be performed at the Adelaide Festival in March 2023.

=== Contemporary Asian Australian Performance ===
Contemporary Asian Australian Performance (CAAP), formerly Performance 4A, led by Annette Shun Wah, produces cross-artform Asian Australian theatrical works. Its incorporated association was formerly known as Theatre 4A. The company has its origins in the Asian Australian Artists Association Inc., which founded Gallery 4A (now 4A Centre for Contemporary Asian Art) and Performance 4A in 1997.

== Carriageworks Farmers Market ==
Carriageworks Farmers Market, is a weekly farmers' market for over seventy regular stallholders featuring seasonal fresh produce including organic, biodynamic foods from farmers and food producers across rural and regional New South Wales. It has operated at the venue since 28 February 2009. The permanent market site is housed in the custom-renovated blacksmith's workshop. Before the COVID-19 pandemic, the market was attracting about 5,000 visitors each weekend.

== Exhibitions ==
In November–December 2016, the 40th anniversary of NAISDA Dance College was celebrated in an exhibition at Carriageworks. Naya Wa Yugali ("We Dance" in Darkinyung language) featured oral histories, photographs, film footage and artwork by Tracey Moffatt, Michael Riley, Juno Gemes, Lee Chittick and Elaine Kitchener as well as a specially commissioned work by Vicki Van Hout and Marian Abboud.
