= Gang of Youths discography =

- Gang of Youths performing in Kingston upon Thames, 2022.
- Studio albums: 3
- EPs: 3
- Live albums: 1
- Compilation albums: 1
- Singles: 24

Australian alternative rock band Gang of Youths have released three studio albums, one live album, one compilation album, three extended plays and 24 singles. The band consists of lead vocalist and rhythm guitarist David Le'aupepe, lead guitarist Jung Kim, drummer Donnie Borzestowski and violinist Tom Holden.

The band's first studio album, The Positions (2015), debuted at number five on the ARIA Albums Chart. It was supported by the certified platinum single "Magnolia". In 2017, their second album, Go Farther in Lightness, peaked at number one in Australia, and was preceded by their first Australian top 50 single "Let Me Down Easy". In the Triple J Hottest 100 of 2017, the album held a three positions in the top 10. The following year, a concert film and live album was released from their MTV Unplugged performance in Melbourne. In 2021, Gang of Youths' comeback single, "The Angel of 8th Ave." was released supporting their third studio album, Angel in Realtime (2022) which debuted at number one in Australia and number 10 on the UK Albums Chart. An accompanying EP, Immolation Tape, was released the same year and features acoustic renditions of album tracks.

== Albums ==
=== Studio albums ===
List of studio albums, with release date, label, and chart positions and certifications shown
Title	Album details	Peak chart positions						Certifications
Title	Album details	AUS	HUN	NZ	SCO	UK	US Sales	Certifications
The Positions	Released: 17 April 2015; Label: Mosy Recordings, Sony Australia; Formats: CD, LP, digital download, streaming	5	—	—	—	—	—	ARIA: Gold
Go Farther in Lightness	Released: 18 August 2017; Label: Mosy, Sony; Formats: CD, LP, digital download, streaming	1	—	— (Note: Go Farther in Lightness did not enter the NZ Top 40 Albums Chart, but peaked at number 3 on the NZ Heatseeker Albums Chart.)	—	— (Note: Go Farther in Lightness did not enter the UK Albums Chart, but peaked at number 35 on the UK Records Store Chart.)	—	ARIA: Platinum
Angel in Realtime	Released: 25 February 2022; Label: Mosy, Sony; Formats: CD, LP, digital download, streaming	1	12	37	6	10	94	ARIA: Silver
Compañero	Released: 12 March 2027	TBA						
"—" denotes a recording that did not chart or was not released in that territory.

=== Live albums ===
List of live albums, with release date, label, and chart positions shown
Title	Album details	Peak chart positions
Title	Album details	AUS
MTV Unplugged (Live in Melbourne)	Released: 26 October 2018; Label: Mosy, Sony; Formats: CD, DVD, digital download, streaming	5

=== Compilation albums ===
List of compilation albums, with details shown
Title	EP details
Triple J Like a Version Sessions	Released: 12 August 2022; Label: ABC; Formats: Digital download, streaming

== Extended plays ==
List of EPs, with release date, label, and chart positions shown
Title	EP details	Peak chart positions
Title	EP details	AUS
Let Me Be Clear	Released: 29 June 2016; Label: Mosy, Sony; Formats: CD, LP, digital download, streaming	2
Total Serene	Released: 16 July 2021; Label: Mosy, Sony; Formats: Digital download, streaming	—
Immolation Tape	Released: 20 May 2022; Label: Mosy, Sony; Formats: Digital download, streaming	—

== Singles ==
=== As lead artist ===
List of singles, with year released, chart positions, certifications, and album name shown
Title	Year	Peak chart positions						Certifications	Album
Title	Year	AUS	Triple J Hottest 100	CAN Rock	US AAA	US Alt.	US Rock Air.	Certifications	Album
"Evangelists"	2013	—	—	—	—	—	—		Non-album singles
"Riverlands"	2014	—	—	—	—	—	—		Non-album singles
"Poison Drum"	2014	—	—	—	—	—	—		The Positions
"Benevolence Riots"	2014	—	—	—	—	—	—		Non-album single
"Radioface"	2015	—	—	—	—	—	—		The Positions
"Magnolia"	2015	—	6 (Note: "Magnolia" has polled three times: No. 21 in Triple J's Hottest 100 of 2015, No. 6 in the Hottest 100 of the 2010s (2020), and No. 42 in the Hottest 100 of Australian Songs (2025).)	—	—	—	—	ARIA: Platinum	The Positions
"Heroes" (cover of David Bowie)	2016	—	—	—	—	—	—		Non-album single (Note: This single was uploaded on the band's SoundCloud profile in January 2016, but it was not released on streaming platforms until October 2017.)
"Strange Diseases"	2016	—	50	—	—	—	—		Let Me Be Clear
"What Can I Do If the Fire Goes Out?"	2017	— (Note: "What Can I Do If the Fire Goes Out?" did not enter the Australian ARIA Singles Chart but peaked at number 13 on the ARIA Hitseekers Chart.)	10	—	—	—	—	ARIA: Platinum	Go Farther in Lightness
"Atlas Drowned"	2017	—	—	—	—	—	—		Go Farther in Lightness
"Let Me Down Easy"	2017	49	2 (Note: "Let Me Down Easy" has polled three times: No. 2 in Triple J's Hottest 100 of 2017, No. 19 in the Hottest 100 of the 2010s (2020), and No. 60 in the Hottest 100 of Australian Songs (2025).)	—	—	—	—	ARIA: 2× Platinum; RMNZ: Gold	Go Farther in Lightness
"Keep Me In the Open"	2017	—	—	—	—	—	—		Go Farther in Lightness
"The Deepest Sighs, the Frankest Shadows"	2017	93	5 (Note: "The Deepest Sighs, the Frankest Shadows" has polled three times: No. 5 in Triple J's Hottest 100 of 2017, No. 52 in the Hottest 100 of the 2010s (2020), and No. 87 in the Hottest 100 of Australian Songs (2025).)	—	—	—	—	ARIA: Platinum	Go Farther in Lightness
"The Heart Is a Muscle"	2017	—	—	—	37	—	—	ARIA: Gold	Go Farther in Lightness
"Still Unbeaten Life" (live)	2018	—	—	—	—	—	—		MTV Unplugged (Live in Melbourne)
"Fear and Trembling" (live)	2018	—	—	—	—	—	—		MTV Unplugged (Live in Melbourne)
"The Angel of 8th Ave."	2021	48	6	16	7	29	31		Total Serene (Note: Both "The Angel of 8th Ave." and "Unison" were later featured on Angel in Realtime.)
"Unison"	2021	—	—	—	—	—	—		Total Serene
"The Man Himself"	2021	—	57	—	—	—	—		Angel in Realtime
"Tend the Garden"	2021	—	—	—	—	—	—		Angel in Realtime
"In the Wake of Your Leave"	2022	—	9	49	28	—	—		Angel in Realtime
"Spirit Boy"	2022	—	—	—	—	—	—		Angel in Realtime
"Shot in the Arm" (cover of Wilco)	2022	—	—	—	—	—	—		Immolation Tape
"Have Yourself a Merry Little Christmas" (cover of Judy Garland)	2023	—	—	—	—	—	—		Non-album single
"Things Take Time"	2026	11	—	—	—	—	—		Compañero
"Benny's Video"	2026	—	—	—	—	—	—		Compañero

=== Split singles ===
List of split singles, with year released, chart positions, and album name shown
Title	Year	Peak chart positions	Album
Title	Year	UK Sales	Album
"A Fantastic Death (Demo)/ The Angel of 8th Ave. (Alternate Version)"	2022	95	Non-album single

=== As featured artist ===
List of featured songs, with year released, chart positions, and album name shown
Title	Year	Peak chart positions	Album
Title	Year	UK	Album
"Blood (Live from Stockholm)" (Mumford & Sons featuring Gang of Youths) (Note: Gang of Youths previously covered "Blood" by the Middle East for Like a Version in 2017.)	2020	—	Delta Tour EP
"I'm on Fire" (Sam Fender featuring Gang of Youths)	2022	— (Note: "I'm on Fire" did not enter the UK Singles Chart, but peaked at number 88 on the UK Singles Sales Chart.)	Apple Music Home Session
"—" denotes items which were not released in that country or failed to chart.

=== Other contributions ===
List of songs contributed to other albums, with year released, album name, and notes shown
Song	Year	Album	Notes
"All My Friends" (cover of LCD Soundsystem)	2015	Like a Version 11	Covers performed by Gang of Youths for Triple J's live music segment, Like a Version.
"Blood" (cover of the Middle East)	2018	Like a Version 14	Covers performed by Gang of Youths for Triple J's live music segment, Like a Version.
"Worldly-wise" (by Gretta Ray)	2021	Begin to Look Around	Co-produced by Gang of Youths, with backing vocals by David Le'aupepe.
