= The Chats discography =

Discography of rock band, the Chats

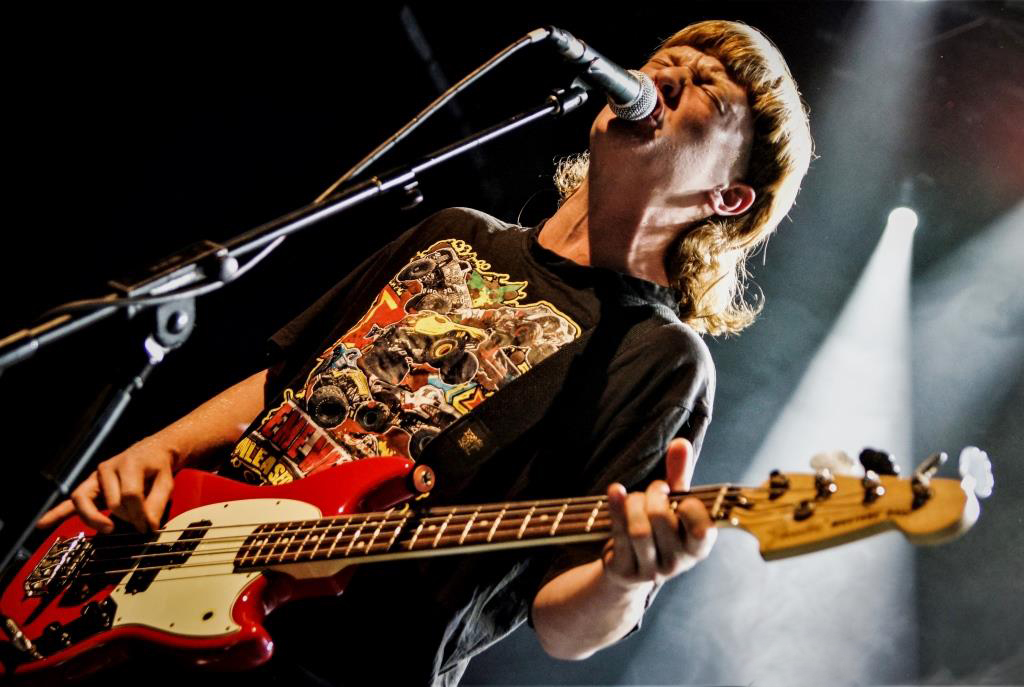
- Eamon Sandwith of The Chats
- Studio albums: 2
- EPs: 2
- Compilation albums: 1
- Singles: 11
- Music videos: 14

The Chats are an Australian rock band that formed in 2016 in Sunshine Coast, Queensland. The band is composed of singer and bassist Eamon Sandwith, drummer Matt Boggis, and guitarist Josh Hardy.

The Chats have released two studio albums, two extended plays, one compilation album, and 11 singles.

The Chats released their first album High Risk Behaviour through Bargain Bin Records in 2020 and their second album, Get Fucked being released in 2022.

== Albums ==
=== Studio albums ===
List of studio albums, with selected details and chart positions
Title	Album details	Peak chart positions					
Title	Album details	AUS	BEL (FL)	GER	SCO	UK	UK Ind.
High Risk Behaviour	Released: 27 March 2020; Label: Bargain Bin; Format: CD, LP, digital download, streaming	5	116	—	15	—	—
Get Fucked	Released: 19 August 2022; Label: Bargain Bin; Format: CD, LP, cassette, digital download, streaming	2	—	81	12	77	3
Half Cut	To be released: 5 March 2027; Label: Bargain Bin; Format: CD, LP, cassette, digital download, streaming	TBA	TBA	TBA	TBA	TBA	TBA

=== Compilation albums ===
List of compilation albums
Title	Album details
The First Two EPs by the Chats	Released: 7 May 2021; Label: Bargain Bin; Format: CD

== Extended plays ==
List of extended plays
Title	EP details
The Chats	Released: 7 November 2016 (Note: Although it was their first EP, it was not released officially until after their second EP "Get This in Ya" was released online.); Label: The Chats; Format: Digital download, streaming, LP
Get This in Ya!!	Released: 31 July 2017; Label: The Chats; Format: CD, LP, cassette, digital download, streaming

== Singles ==
List of singles, with selected certifications, showing year released and album name
Title	Year	Certifications	Album
"Smoko"	2017	ARIA: Gold	Get This in Ya!!
"Do What I Want"	2018		High Risk Behaviour
"Pub Feed"	2019	ARIA: Gold	High Risk Behaviour
"Identity Theft"	2019		High Risk Behaviour
"The Clap"	2020		High Risk Behaviour
"Dine N Dash"	2020		High Risk Behaviour
"ACϟDC CD"	2020		Non-album single
"Struck By Lightning"	2022		Get Fucked
"6L GTR"	2022		Get Fucked
"I've Been Drunk in Every Pub in Brisbane"	2022		Get Fucked
"Out On the Street"	2022		Get Fucked
"Off It"	2026		Half Cut

== Album appearances ==
List of album appearances
Title	Year	Album
"Holier than Thou" (Metallica cover)	2021	The Metallica Blacklist
"Can You (Point Your Fingers and Do The Twist?)" (The Wiggles cover)	2022	ReWiggled

== Music videos ==
Year	Title	Director
2017	"Smoko"	Matisse Langbein
2019	"Pub Feed"	Matt Weston
2019	"Identity Theft"	Matt Weston
2020	"The Clap"	Matt Weston
2020	"Dine N Dash"	Matt Weston
2020	"ACϟDC CD"	Natalie Sim
2022	"Struck by Lightning"	Matt Weston
2022	"Can You (Point Your Fingers and Do The Twist?)" (The Wiggles cover)	Unknown
2022	"6L GTR"	Marco Imov
2022	"I've Been Drunk in Every Pub in Brisbane"	
2022	"Out on the Streets"	
2026	"Off It"	Matt Weston
