= Triple J's Hottest 100 of Like a Version =

2023 Australian music poll

Like a Version Triple J Hottest 100

Countdown details
- Date of countdown: 15 July 2023
- Charity partner: None

Countdown highlights
- Winning song: "Believe" by DMA's (cover of Cher)
- Most entries: Gang of Youths (3)

Chronology
← Previous; 2022	Next → 2023

The Hottest 100 of Like a Version was announced by Australian youth radio station Triple J on 15 July 2023. It was the broadcaster's first countdown compiling covers from their live music segment, Like a Version, which was celebrating its 20th year. Voting opened on 23 May, and closed on 10 July 2023.

Australian rock band DMA's were voted into number one with their 2016 cover of "Believe" by Cher. Meanwhile, Gang of Youths had the most tracks in the countdown, with all three of their covers on the segment polling, and tied with Tame Impala in having the most songs covered by other artists.

A limited edition vinyl was released in November 2025.

== Background ==
The Hottest 100 is an annual music poll hosted by national youth radio station Triple J. The countdown has been held since 1989, and compiles the top songs of that year as voted by listeners. Several one-off special countdowns have also been announced through the years, including the Hottest 100 of the Past 20 Years (2013) and of the 2010s (2020).

Every Friday morning, Triple J broadcasts Like a Version, a live music segment where an artist performs an original track and covers another artist's song. The programme began in 2004.

The Hottest 100 of Like a Version was announced on 18 May 2023, when Triple J uploaded over 400 classic covers from the segment on their YouTube channel. The entire voting list for the countdown contained 850 covers from over 650 artists.

== Predictions ==
On 14 July 2023, Australian online bookmaker Sportsbet was favouring the DMA's 2016 cover of "Believe" by Cher, followed by Denzel Curry's 2019 cover of "Bulls on Parade" by Rage Against the Machine, which were voted into first and second, respectively. In the days before the event, Triple J revealed some facts about the countdown: Australian artists make up 80% of the full list, 17 artists would make their Hottest 100 debut, and only three tracks are from 2008 or earlier.

== Full list ==
Note: Australian artists

#	Song	Artist	Original artist	Cover artist country	Year	Annual Hottest 100 position
1	Believe	DMA's	Cher	Australia	2016	6
2	Bulls on Parade	Denzel Curry	Rage Against the Machine	United States	2019	5
3	Baby Come Back	Ocean Alley	Player	Australia	2018	16
4	I Touch Myself	Lime Cordiale	Divinyls	Australia	2019	17
5	Dumb Things	A.B. Original featuring Paul Kelly and Dan Sultan	Paul Kelly and the Coloured Girls	Australia	2016	45
6	Blood	Gang of Youths	The Middle East	Australia	2017	41
7	Yellow	King Stingray	Coldplay	Australia	2022	43
8	Brother	Thundamentals	Matt Corby	Australia	2012	49
9	(Lover) You Don't Treat Me No Good	Chet Faker	Sonia Dada	Australia	2014	21
10	Elephant	The Wiggles	Tame Impala	Australia	2021	1
11	Am I Ever Gonna See Your Face Again	Dune Rats	The Angels	Australia	2022	23
12	Ausmusic Month Medley	Illy	Silverchair/Hilltop Hoods/Powderfinger/Paul Kelly/Flume	Australia	2013	66
13	Welcome to the Black Parade	Alex Lahey	My Chemical Romance	Australia	2019	83
14	Here Comes the Sun	Spacey Jane	The Beatles	Australia	2021	30
15	Keeping Score	Paces featuring Guy Sebastian	L D R U featuring Paige IV	Australia	2016	56
16	Shooting Stars	Flume featuring Toro y Moi	Bag Raiders	Australia/United States	2022	30
17	Better in Blak	Beddy Rays	Thelma Plum	Australia	2021	
18	I Was Only 19	The Herd	Redgum	Australia	2005	
19	Here Comes Your Man	Skegss	Pixies	Australia	2019	90
20	I Will Follow You into the Dark	Yungblud and Halsey	Death Cab for Cutie	United Kingdom/United States	2019	
21	How to Make Gravy	Luca Brasi	Paul Kelly	Australia	2016	
22	Lady Marmalade	G Flip featuring Thandi Phoenix, JessB, Jess Kent, Isabella Manfredi, Rosie Fitzgerald, Alex the Astronaut, Clio Renner, Kate Richards, Bernice Tesara and Carla Dobbie	Labelle (via Christina Aguilera, Lil' Kim, Mya and Pink)	Australia/New Zealand	2020	78
23	Feels Like We Only Go Backwards	Alex Turner	Tame Impala	United Kingdom	2014	
24	Breathe/Comfortably Numb/Money	Ocean Alley	Pink Floyd	Australia	2021	54
25	Charlie	Bugs	Mallrat	Australia	2020	91
26	So Into You	Childish Gambino	Tamia	United States	2015	
27	Delete	Sticky Fingers	DMA's	Australia	2015	84
28	Time After Time	Triple One	Cyndi Lauper	Australia	2021	
29	Do I Wanna Know?	Chvrches	Arctic Monkeys	United Kingdom	2014	54
30	The Special Two	Dear Seattle	Missy Higgins	Australia	2019	
31	Edge of Town	Paul Dempsey	Middle Kids	Australia	2017	88
32	Hey, Ma	The Vanns	Bon Iver	Australia	2020	
33	What Can I Do If the Fire Goes Out?	Nothing But Thieves	Gang of Youths	United Kingdom	2018	72
34	Read My Mind	Catfish & the Bottlemen	The Killers	United Kingdom	2015	
35	Get Lucky	San Cisco	Daft Punk featuring Pharrell Williams and Nile Rodgers	Australia	2013	39
36	When the Party's Over	Cub Sport	Billie Eilish	Australia	2019	
37	Catch My Disease	The Terrys	Ben Lee	Australia	2022	
38	Seventeen Going Under	Camp Cope	Sam Fender	Australia	2022	
39	Why Does It Always Rain on Me?	Gang of Youths	Travis	Australia	2022	
40	Magnolia	Odette	Gang of Youths	Australia	2018	
41	Electric Feel	Tash Sultana	MGMT	Australia	2017	78
42	Big Yellow Taxi	Allday and The Veronicas	Joni Mitchell	Australia	2019	
43	Hearts a Mess	Missy Higgins	Gotye	Australia	2012	
44	That Don't Impress Me Much	Haim	Shania Twain	United States	2017	
45	Sweet Nothing	Something for Kate	Calvin Harris featuring Florence Welch	Australia	2013	68
46	Running Up That Hill	The Wombats	Kate Bush	United Kingdom	2022	
47	Song 2	Baker Boy	Blur	Australia	2022	
48	Lonely Boy	Matt Corby	The Black Keys	Australia	2012	69
49	The Scientist	Sly Withers	Coldplay	Australia	2021	
50	Paranoid Android	Ball Park Music	Radiohead	Australia	2020	
51	Africa	Dave Winnel featuring André, KLP, Rob Edwards and Jack Robert	Toto	Australia	2022	
52	4ever	San Cisco	Clairo	Australia	2018	
53	My Happiness	Ball Park Music	Powderfinger	Australia	2017	
54	Teardrop	Aurora	Massive Attack	Norway	2017	
55	Black Fingernails, Red Wine	Polaris	Eskimo Joe	Australia	2020	
56	Can't Stop/In the Air Tonight	Hilltop Hoods	Red Hot Chili Peppers/Phil Collins	Australia	2019	
57	Life on Mars?	Sarah Blasko	David Bowie	Australia	2016	
58	A Girl Like You	Tame Impala	Edwyn Collins	Australia	2021	66
59	I Try	Hockey Dad featuring Hatchie	Macy Gray	Australia	2019	
60	Chains	Matt Corby	Tina Arena	Australia	2016	
61	My Boo	Flume featuring Kučka, Ngaiire, Vera Blue and Vince Staples	Ghost Town DJ's	Australia/Papua New Guinea/United States	2016	
62	Say My Name	Glass Animals	Destiny's Child	United Kingdom	2022	
63	Knowing Me, Knowing You	Angie McMahon	ABBA	Australia	2019	
64	The Unguarded Moment	Ruby Fields	The Church	Australia	2019	
65	Rhiannon	Sticky Fingers	Fleetwood Mac	Australia	2012	
66	Cardigan	Something for Kate	Taylor Swift	Australia	2021	
67	Heaven	Confidence Man	Bryan Adams (via DJ Sammy and Yanou featuring Do)	Australia	2022	
68	Bridges	Meg Mac	Broods	Australia	2014	91
69	Blackfella/Whitefella	Bad Dreems featuring Peter Garrett, Mambali and Emily Wurramara	Warumpi Band	Australia	2019	
70	Enter Sandman	Art vs. Science	Metallica	Australia	2015	
71	Let It Happen	Meg Mac	Tame Impala	Australia	2017	
72	Zombie	Cxloe	The Cranberries	Australia	2020	
73	Love Is in the Air	Stella Donnelly	John Paul Young	Australia	2020	
74	LOVE.	Chvrches	Kendrick Lamar featuring Zacari	United Kingdom	2018	
75	All My Friends	Gang of Youths	LCD Soundsystem	Australia	2015	
76	Changes	JK-47 featuring Bronte Eve	2Pac	Australia	2021	
77	Passionfruit	Angus & Julia Stone	Drake	Australia	2018	
78	Skinny Love	Slowly Slowly	Bon Iver	Australia	2019	
79	Someday	Julia Jacklin	The Strokes	Australia	2017	
80	Dancing On My Own	Tove Lo	Robyn	Sweden	2022	
81	(Sittin' On) The Dock of the Bay	ASAP Rocky	Otis Redding	United States	2018	
82	Bad	Billie Eilish	Michael Jackson	United States	2018	
83	Naïve	Tyne-James Organ	The Kooks	Australia	2021	
84	The Deepest Sighs, the Frankest Shadows	Gretta Ray	Gang of Youths	Australia	2021	
85	End of the Road	Bluejuice	Boyz II Men	Australia	2014	
86	Across the Universe	Aurora	The Beatles	Norway	2019	
87	Big Jet Plane	Tuka	Angus & Julia Stone	Australia	2015	81
88	UFO	Ocean Grove	Sneaky Sound System	Australia	2021	
89	Forever Young	Tones and I featuring Jordan Dennis	Alphaville (via Youth Group)	Australia	2019	
90	Smoko	Wet Leg	The Chats	United Kingdom	2022	
91	Teachers Pet	Grentperez	Jack Black and the cast of School of Rock	Australia	2022	
92	Don't You (Forget About Me)	Boy & Bear featuring Annie Hamilton	Simple Minds	Australia	2021	
93	Roll Up Your Sleeves	Urthboy	Meg Mac	Australia	2015	
94	Righteous	Stand Atlantic	Juice Wrld	Australia	2020	
95	Lazy Eye	Violent Soho	Silversun Pickups	Australia	2016	
96	Redbone	Northeast Party House	Childish Gambino	Australia	2017	
97	Alive	George Alice	Rüfüs Du Sol	Australia	2022	
98	Be Alright	Amy Shark	Dean Lewis	Australia	2018	
99	Real Love	Regina Spektor	John Lennon	United States	2007	29
100	Kids	The Kooks	MGMT	United Kingdom	2008	

== Statistics ==
=== Artists with multiple entries ===
Covering artists
#	Artist	Entries
3	Gang of Youths	6, 39, 75
3	Paul Dempsey (Note: Once solo (31) and twice with Something for Kate (45, 66))	31, 45, 66
2	Ocean Alley	3, 24
2	Flume	16, 61
2	Sticky Fingers	27, 65
2	Chvrches	29, 74
2	San Cisco	35, 52
2	Something for Kate	45, 66
2	Matt Corby	48, 60
2	Ball Park Music	50, 53
2	Aurora	54, 86
2	Meg Mac	68, 71

Covered (original) artists
#	Artist	Entries
3	Paul Kelly	5, 12, 21
3	Tame Impala	10, 23, 71
3	Gang of Youths	40, 33, 84
2	Coldplay	7, 49
2	Powderfinger	12, 53
2	The Beatles	14, 86
2	Bon Iver	32, 78
2	MGMT	41, 100

=== Countries represented ===
Country	Count
Australia	81
United Kingdom	10
United States	8
Norway	2
Sweden	1

== Triple J's Best Australian Like A Version ==
Triple J's Best Australian Like A Version

Compilation album by Various artists
- Released: 21 November 2025
- Recorded: 2013–2024
- Length: 48:13
- Label: Australian Broadcasting Corporation
- Producer: Greg Wales

In November 2025, a compilation was released digitally with a limited edition on vinyl.

=== Track listing ===
Side A
No.	Title	Writer(s)	Performed by	Length
1.	"Believe" (recorded in 2016)	Paul Barry, Brian Higgins, Steven Torch	DMA's	3:13
2.	"Cruel Summer" (recorded in 2023)	Taylor Swift, Jack Antonoff, Annie Clark	G Flip	3:26
3.	"Murder on the Dancefloor" (recorded in 2024)	Sophie Ellis-Bextor, Gregg Alexander	Royel Otis	3:00
4.	"The Unguarded Moment" (recorded in 2019)	Steve Kilbey, Mikella Parker	Ruby Fields	4:38
5.	"Shooting Stars" (recorded in 2022)	Jack Glass, Chris Stracey	Flume and Toro y Moi	3:09
6.	"I Touch Myself" (recorded in 2019)	Christine Amphlett, Tom Kelly, Mark McEntee, Billy Steinberg	Lime Cordiale	3:35
7.	"One of Your Girls" (recorded in 2024)	Troye Sivan, Oscar Görres, Brett McLaughlin	Missy Higgins	2:46

Side B
No.	Title	Writer(s)	Performed by	Length
1.	"Roxanne" (recorded in 2024)	Sting	South Summit	3:49
2.	"Elephant" (recorded in 2021)	Kevin Parker, Jay Watson	The Wiggles	3:22
3.	"Am I Ever Gonna See Your Face Again " (recorded in 2022)	John Brewster, Richard Brewster, Doc Neeson	Dune Rats	4:02
4.	"Yellow" (recorded in 2022)	Guy Berryman, Jonny Buckland, Will Champion, Chris Martin	King Stingray	5:21
5.	"Get Lucky" (recorded in 2013)	Thomas Bangalter, Guy-Manuel de Homem-Christo, Nile Rodgers, Pharrell Williams	San Cisco	3:44
6.	"Knowing Me, Knowing You" (recorded in 2019)	Stig Anderson, Benny Andersson, Björn Ulvaeus	Angie McMahon	4:02

=== Charts ===
Weekly chart performance for Triple J's Best Australian Like A Version
Chart (2025)	Peak position
Australian Compilations (ARIA)	1
