= Smoko =

Short break taken during work

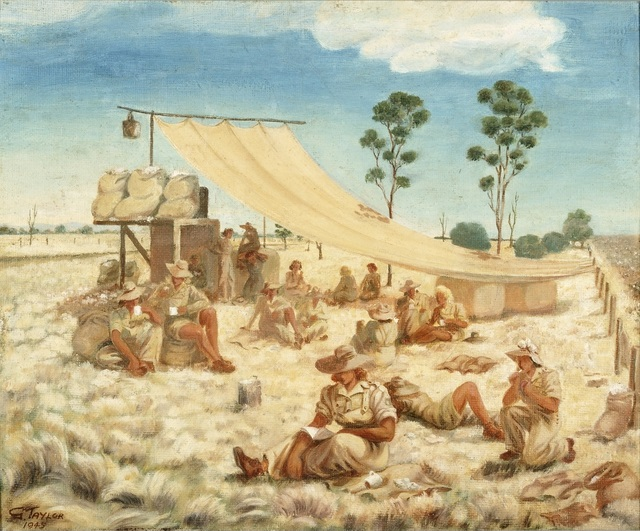
A painting titled Smoko time with the AWLA

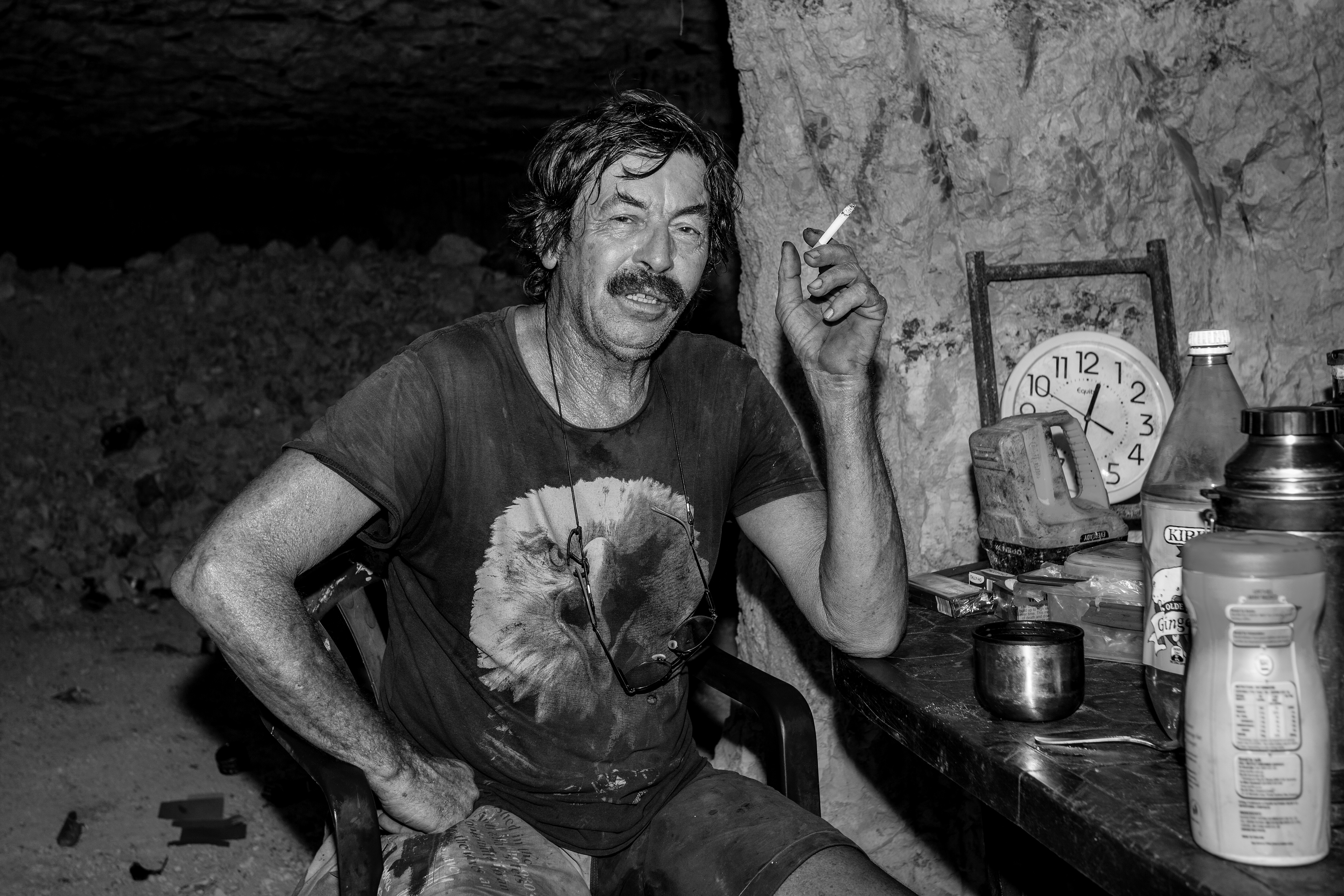
An opal miner on a smoko in Lightning Ridge, New South Wales

In Australian, New Zealand, Falkland, and Antarctic English a smoko (also "smoke-o" or "smoke-oh") is a short, often informal break taken during work or military duty, although any short break such as a rest or a coffee or tea break can be called a smoko. Among sheep shearers in Australia, the smoko is a mid-morning break, between breakfast and lunch, in which a light meal may be eaten.

There is a town in Victoria, Australia, called Smoko, which "gained its name in 1865 because gold seekers regularly stopped here for a smoke and a rest on their way to and from the goldfields".

The term is believed to have originated in the British Merchant Navy, and was in use as early as 1857. The term is still in use in the British Merchant Navy today. The tradition of a smoko in the Australian sense seems to have begun amongst sheep shearers in the 1860s.

Although a slang term, the word "smoko" has been used in government writing and industrial relations reports to mean a short work break. The term achieved broader awareness in the United States and United Kingdom following the popularity of the song "Smoko" by Australian band The Chats.

== Smoko as an Australian institution ==
The smoko break in Australia has become an institution symbolic of working culture and even of workers' rights. The Australian Industrial Relations Commission has arbitrated cases of industrial action over workers' entitlement to a smoko break.

There are, however, considerable health and productivity concerns about smoke breaks, and non-smoking workers are sometimes concerned that their smoking colleagues take more time on breaks.

In 2006, the Australian government's Department of Industry, Tourism and Resources banned the "smoko" from its Canberra offices, prompting then Health Minister Tony Abbott to declare that the "smoko has had its day". In January 2010 the Health Department announced a ban on its employees taking cigarette breaks, or "smokos".

== See also ==
- Break (work)
- Siesta
- Smoking in Australia
- Smoking in New Zealand
