= Compañero (album) =

2027 studio album by Gang of Youths

Studio album by Gang of Youths
- Released: 12 March 2027
- Studios: Various (all London): Decoy; Redchurch; Urchin; Hoxa; Cloud 9
- Labels: Mosy; Sony Australia; RCA UK; Arista
- Producer: Jung Kim

Gang of Youths chronology
Triple J Like a Version Sessions (2022)	Compañero (2027)

Singles from Compañero
- 1. "Things Take Time" Released: 18 August 2026; 2. "Benny's Video" Released: 13 November 2026

Compañero is the fourth studio album by Australian alternative rock band Gang of Youths, scheduled to be released on 12 March 2027 by Mosy, Sony, RCA UK, and Arista Records.

Their first album since Angel in Realtime (2022), Compañero was recorded in London across various studios and was supported by two singles—"Things Take Time" and "Benny's Video". It is their first to not feature inaugural bassist Max Dunn following his departure from the band.

== Background and release ==
Four years prior, Gang of Youths released their studio album Angel in Realtime (2022). Sometime thereafter, inaugural bassist Max Dunn departed the band and begun working at an entertainment law firm in London. The band subsequently returned to London and began writing and recording their fourth studio album.

Compañero was announced on 12 November 2026, alongside the release of single "Benny's Video". The album was described as being "inspired by [both] an examination and a celebration of what it means to be alive".

== Release and promotion ==
Gang of Youth's previous studio album, Angel in Realtime was released in 2022.

Gang of Youth's performed at Anita's Theatre in Thirroul on 6 August 2026, followed by Sydney Opera House's Concert Hall on 8 and 10 August 2026. It was the group's first hometown shows in over four years.

"Things Take Time" was released on 18 August 2026. At the 2026 ARIA Music Awards it was nominated for Best Alternative Release and Best Group.

The album's second single, "Benny's Video" was released 13 November 2026. It was named after the Michael Haneke-directed film of the same name.

The group are scheduled to perform four shows in November and December, in Amsterdam, Paris, Manchester and London.

The group is scheduled to headline Tasmania's Party in the Paddock on 5 February 2027.

Gang of Youth will promote the album with a tour of the United States in March and April 2027, concluding with a performance at Coachella.

== Track listing ==
1. "This Machine, It's a Classic"
2. "Things Take Time"
3. "YeYu"
4. "Manilla '98"
5. "Street Value"
6. "Desert Life Museum"
7. "Benny's Video"
8. "Major Arcana"
9. "Ants Control the World"
10. "Which Side of the River Are You On?"
11. "Future Be Kind"
