= Pub Feed =

Single by the Chats

from the album High Risk Behaviour
- Released: 22 March 2019
- Length: 2:26
- Label: Bargain Bin
- Songwriters: Eamon Sandwith; Josh Price; Matt Boggis
- Producer: Billy Gardner

The Chats singles chronology
"Do What I Want" (2018)	"Pub Feed" (2019)	"Identity Theft" (2019)

Music video
- "Pub Feed" on YouTube

"Pub Feed" is a song by Australian punk rock band The Chats, released by Bargain Bin Records on 22 March 2019 as the second single from their debut studio album, High Risk Behaviour (2020).

Dubbed an "anthem" to Australian cuisine, "Pub Feed" received praise for its representation of Australian culture. The song's release was supported by an accompanying music video and the national Pub Feed Tour from May to June 2019.

"Pub Feed" was ranked at number 21 in Australian youth broadcaster Triple J's Hottest 100 of 2019. It was certified gold in Australia in April 2024, denoting sales in excess of 35,000 units.

== Release and promotion ==
In March 2019, the Chats announced their signing to Universal Music. Later that week, on March 21, the band premiered "Pub Feed" on youth radio station Triple J's local music program, Home and Hosed. The track was officially released the following day, alongside an accompanying music video. It became the weekly feature video on ABC TV's music television program Rage.

The Chats embarked on the national Pub Feed Tour from May to June 2019. The band also performed the song live on Australian breakfast TV show Today in February 2020. Joseph Earp of Junkee dubbed the subsequent interview with host Karl Stefanovic "chaotic", noting that it ended "with an even more chaotic performance".

== Critical reception ==
Noted for being an "anthem" to Australian cuisine, "Pub Feed" received praise for its capturing of Australian culture.

Sonically, "Pub Feed" features "heavy guitars, smashing drums and booming bass" alongside the band's "signature Aussie banter". Its lyricism was compared that of their viral 2017 single "Smoko". Writing for Life Without Andy, Harry Webber wrote "Pub Feed" is the "homage to schnitties, rump steak, and pies that we never knew we needed." Tyler Jenke of Tone Deaf said "you'll be hard-pressed to find a more Aussie tune than this one." Happy Mag's Mia Hull thought the track to be a "sonically and lyrically masterful ode".

== Commercial performance ==
On 22 January 2020, "Pub Feed" polled at number 21 in Australian youth broadcaster Triple J's Hottest 100 of 2019. It was certified gold in Australia on 30 April 2024 for sales in excess of 35,000 units.

== Music video ==
The music video, directed by Matt Weston, was officially released on 22 March 2019 (one day after its premiere) and features a cameo appearance from Jack Griffith of Australian punk band Pist Idiots.

== In popular culture ==
Australian thrash metal band Hidden Intent released a cover of "Pub Feed" in 2020. Its music video featured a webcam video collage of the band and their friends "craving a pub feed" whilst in COVID-19 isolation. In 2022, as part of the tribute album ReWiggled, Australian children's band the Wiggles covered "Pub Feed", while the Chats covered "Can You (Point Your Fingers and Do The Twist?)".

== Credits and personnel ==
The Chats:

- Eamon Sandwith – vocals, writing, bass
- Josh Price – guitar, writing, vocals
- Matt Boggis – drums, writing, vocals

=== Other musicians ===
- Billy Gardner – production

== Certifications ==
Certifications for "Pub Feed"
Region	Certification	Certified units/sales
Australia (ARIA)	Gold	35,000^{‡}
^{‡} Sales+streaming figures based on certification alone.
