= Get Fucked =

Studio album by the Chats
- Released: 19 August 2022
- Recorded: 2021
- Studios: Hunting Ground, Brisbane
- Genres: Punk rock; pub rock
- Length: 27:56
- Label: Bargain Bin
- Producer: Cody McWaters

The Chats chronology
High Risk Behaviour (2020)	Get Fucked (2022)	Half Cut (2027)

Singles from Get Fucked
- 1. "Struck by Lightning" Released: 11 March 2022; 2. "6L GTR" Released: 5 May 2022; 3. "I've Been Drunk in Every Pub in Brisbane" Released: 11 July 2022; 4. "Out on the Street" Released: 15 August 2022

Get Fucked is the second studio album by Australian punk rock band the Chats. The album was recorded in six days in Brisbane and released on 19 August 2022 through the band's own label, Bargain Bin. It is their first album to feature Josh Hardy on guitar, following the departure of Josh Price in 2020.

Praised for being "loaded with more instantly quotable Aussie idioms", the album lyrically explores elements of Australian culture while also "tapping into universal anxieties" including inflation and "racism in surf culture". Get Fucked was preceded by four singles – "Struck by Lightning", "6L GTR", "I've Been Drunk in Every Pub in Brisbane" and "Out on the Street".

The album debuted at number 2 on the ARIA Albums Chart and number 3 on the UK Independent Albums Chart, also charting in Germany and Scotland. At the 2022 ARIA Music Awards, it won the Best Hard Rock or Heavy Metal Album. In September 2022, the band embarked on the nationwide Get Fucked Tour to support the album.

== Background ==
In March 2020, the Chats released their debut studio album, High Risk Behaviour. It received generally favourable reviews, and won Best Independent Punk Album at the AIR Awards of 2021.

In December 2020, it was announced Josh Price, guitarist of the band, had left to pursue a solo career. Josh Hardy, guitarist of punk rock band the Unknowns, replaced Price. In 2021, the Chats released their first single with Hardy, "AC/DC CD".

== Recording ==
Get Fucked was recorded with producer Cody McWaters in six days at Hunting Ground in Brisbane. On the schedule, frontman Eamon Sandwith admitted their "work etiquette wasn't great", as the band would "start at 11 and finish at 4, and in the middle of that we'd go to the pub for lunch for two hours, and have a few beers".

== Composition ==
The album has been described by critics as "tighter, with better playing and a tougher sound" compared to their debut album, due in part to new guitarist Hardy. Andrew Stafford of The Guardian wrote "his playing sets fire to Struck by Lightning and Panic Attack".

Like the band's previous work, Get Fucked lyrically focus largely on elements of Australian culture. "Boggo Breakout" alludes to a 1989 prison revolt at Boggo Road Gaol, and "Southport Superman" – the band's shortest track – references the Queensland city of Southport. "The Price of Smokes" was praised by multiple outlets for its lyricism which NME described "sums up economic hardship with verve and authority" with the song's politically motivated chants which close the track. "Emperor of the Beach", while not explicitly alluding to the 2005 Cronulla Riots, is "clearly about the attitudes that led to them", mocking "beach racists" and gatekeeping.

John Kinsella of the Saturday Paper was one of many critics to point out the band's sonic inspiration from the Ramones, which Sandwith admits – being a "big influence on the record sonically, but also visually".

== Release ==
On 11 March 2022, lead single "Struck by Lightning" was released. On 5 May, the band announced the record would be titled Get Fucked, and that it would be released on 19 August 2022. A second single, "6L GTR", was released alongside the announcement. "I've Been Drunk in Every Pub in Brisbane" and "Out on the Street" were released on 11 July and 16 August 2022, respectively. Supporting the album release on 19 August, the band embarked on the Get Fucked Tour in September, alongside support acts Mean Jeans, the Prize and Aborted Tortoise.

== Reception ==
Professional ratings
Aggregate scores
Source	Rating
AllMusic	3.5/5 stars
Metacritic	76/100
Review scores
Source	Rating
DIY	4/5 stars
The Guardian	3/5 stars
Kerrang!	4/5 stars
NME	4/5 stars
Pitchfork	7.7/10
Rolling Stone Australia	3.5/5 stars

According to Metacritic, Get Fucked has received "generally favourable reviews".

Stuart Berman of Pitchfork wrote the album is "fast, crass, and loaded with more instantly quotable Aussie idioms than Crocodile Dundee and Hunter put together", praising the band's evolution from their debut album two years prior.

Andrew Stafford of The Guardian praised the album in a three star review, claiming "it's tighter, with better playing and a tougher sound", but wrote it "lacks some of the naive charm that made their debut so endearing". Ali Shutler from NME similarly wrote Get Fucked was "faster, more furious and more direct than anything the Chats have done before".

== Track listing ==
All tracks are written by the Chats.

CD and digital track listing
No.	Title	Length
1.	"6L GTR"	2:05
2.	"Boggo Breakout"	1:25
3.	"Struck by Lightning"	1:40
4.	"Southport Superman"	0:34
5.	"Panic Attack"	2:02
6.	"Ticket Inspector"	2:23
7.	"The Price of Smokes"	3:42
8.	"Dead On Site"	1:44
9.	"Paid Late"	2:08
10.	"I've Been Drunk in Every Pub in Brisbane"	1:29
11.	"Emperor of the Beach"	2:57
12.	"Out on the Street"	2:01
13.	"Getting Better"	3:41
Total length:		27:56

- "Boggo Breakout" and "Struck by Lightning" have swapped positions on the LP track listing.
- "Getting Better" is followed by the hidden track "Jet Lighter" on the LP, and by "Piss Rash" on all other versions.

== Personnel ==
The Chats

- Eamon Sandwith – vocals, bass
- Matt Boggis – drums, backing vocals
- Josh Hardy – guitar, backing vocals

Additional personnel

- Cody McWaters – production, engineering
- Mikey Young – mixing, mastering
- Miles Wilson – design, layout
- Luke Henry – cover photo

== Charts ==
Chart performance for Get Fucked
Chart (2022)	Peak position
Australian Albums (ARIA)	2
German Albums (Offizielle Top 100)	81
Scottish Albums (Official Charts)	12
UK Albums (Official Charts)	77
UK Independent Albums (Official Charts)	3
