= High Risk Behaviour =

Studio album by the Chats
- Released: 27 March 2020
- Recorded: 2019
- Genre: Punk rock
- Length: 28:08
- Label: Bargain Bin
- Producer: Billy Gardner

The Chats chronology
Get This in Ya!! (2017)	High Risk Behaviour (2020)	Get Fucked (2022)

Singles from High Risk Behaviour
- 1. "Do What I Want" Released: 3 July 2018; 2. "Pub Feed" Released: 22 March 2019; 3. "Identity Theft" Released: 26 July 2019; 4. "The Clap" Released: 16 January 2020; 5. "Dine N Dash" Released: 6 March 2020

High Risk Behaviour is the debut studio album by the Australian punk rock band the Chats, released through Bargain Bin Records on 27 March 2020.

It is the group's first full-length release following the release of two EPs, The Chats (2016) and Get This in Ya!! (2017). The release of the album was preceded by five singles: "Do What I Want", "Pub Feed", "Identity Theft", "The Clap", and "Dine N Dash".

It is the only studio album and last release by the band to feature guitarist Josh Price, who left the band in November 2020.

The album debuted and peaked at number 5 on the ARIA Albums Chart. It also charted in Belgium and Scotland, reaching number 15 in the latter country.

At the AIR Awards of 2021, the album won Best Independent Punk Album or EP.

== Background ==
A year prior to the album's release, on 19 March 2019, the band signed a worldwide publishing deal with Universal Music Publishing Australia. On the signing, A&R representative Arwen Hunt praised the band as writing "perfect, three minute nuggets about everyday things that are so obvious, they can only be genius". During the year the band occasionally commented on the then-untitled upcoming album.

The album title allegedly originated from the offence listed on tickets given to drummer Matt Boggis for skateboarding in public.

== Critical reception ==
Professional ratings
Aggregate scores
Source	Rating
AnyDecentMusic?	7.6/10
Metacritic	80/100
Review scores
Source	Rating
AllMusic	4/5 stars
Clash	7/10
Consequence of Sound	B
Contactmusic.com	3.5/5 stars
DIY	4/5 stars
Exclaim!	8/10
The Guardian	4/5 stars
Kerrang!	4/5 stars
Loud and Quiet	8/10
NME	4/5 stars

The album has received mostly positive reviews. Metacritic rated it 80/100, which denotes "generally favourable reviews". Ali Shutler of NME rated it four stars and stated that it was the "perfect soundtrack to being bored, broke and optimistic" and opined that the album saw the band "make good on their promise of being one of the most exciting punk bands around", ending with the review with the declaration that album would be "set to inspire plenty". The Guardian similarly rated it four stars, noted it was "exhilarating, cheerily undemanding fun, something in scant supply at the moment" and compared the album to the first wave of punk rock in the 1970s including The Saints. Exclaim! noted that noted that it had the "classic punk sound" with a fresh sensibility in their lyrics.

== In popular culture ==
The music video for "Dine N Dash" features a cameo by Cecil George Edwards, notable from the famous news segment and viral video "Democracy Manifest". A recreation of the famous clip featuring Edwards appears in the music video's finale. The band have been somewhat credited with revealing the identity of the man in the video, which had been debated for many years.

Australian thrash metal band Hidden Intent recorded a cover of "Pub Feed" as a B-side to their 2020 single, A Place of Horror. The accompanying music video, parodying the COVID-19 lockdown, featured a webcam video collage of the band and their friends "craving a pub feed" while in isolation.

== Track listing ==
All tracks written by the Chats.

1. "Stinker" – 1:32
2. "Drunk N Disorderly" – 1:15
3. "The Clap" – 1:29
4. "Identity Theft" – 2:42
5. "The Kids Need Guns" – 1:17
6. "Dine N Dash" – 1:14
7. "Keep the Grubs Out" – 1:35
8. "Pub Feed" – 2:25
9. "Ross River" – 1:48
10. "Heatstroke" – 2:20
11. "Billy Backwash's Day" – 2:18
12. "4573" – 2:30
13. "Do What I Want" – 2:50
14. "Better Than You" – 2:43

== Personnel ==
The Chats

- Eamon Sandwith – vocals (1–2, 4–14), bass guitar (1–14)
- Josh Price – guitar (1–14), vocals (3)
- Matt Boggis – drums (1–14)

Production

- Billy Gardner – recording
- Mikey Young – mixing, mastering

== Charts ==
=== Weekly charts ===
Chart performance for High Risk Behaviour
Chart (2020)	Peak position
Australian Albums (ARIA)	5
Belgian Albums (Ultratop Flanders)	116
Scottish Albums (Official Charts)	15

=== Year-end charts ===
Chart (2020)	Position
Australian Artist Albums (ARIA)	50
