= Immolation Tape =

EP by Gang of Youths
- Released: 20 May 2022
- Recorded: March 2022
- Studios: SiriusXM; United States
- Genres: Indie folk; baroque pop
- Length: 18:05
- Label: Mosy Recordings
- Producer: Gang of Youths

Gang of Youths chronology
Angel in Realtime (2022)	Immolation Tape (2022)	Triple J Like a Version Sessions (2022)

Singles from Immolation Tape
- 1. "Shot in the Arm" Released: 10 March 2022

Immolation Tape (stylised in all-lowercase) is the third extended play by Australian alternative rock band Gang of Youths, surprise released on 20 May 2022. It contains re-recorded acoustic versions of three tracks from their preceding third studio album Angel in Realtime, as well as a cover of "Shot in the Arm" by Wilco.

== Production and release ==
The EP was recorded at a SiriusXM studio in March 2022 for the station's Spectrum Sessions program in the United States following the release of their third studio album, Angel in Realtime (February). On 10 March, the band released their cover of Wilco's "Shot in the Arm" as part of the session.

On 20 May, the band performed their song "Forbearance" live on American late night talk show Jimmy Kimmel Live. Without any prior announcement, Immolation Tape was released digitally on the same day. In a press release, the band said they "just wanted to chuck it out there for a laugh".

The cover artwork was designed by Melbourne-based graphic director Bradley Pinkerton. In an interview with NME, frontman David Le'aupepe revealed the EP was originally to be titled This Is Fucking SiriusXM, but "it didn’t really work" and "was too on the nose".

== Reception ==
Music publication TotalNtertainment wrote the "stripped back approach" on the EP "provides a fresh warmth and intimacy to these already emotionally charged songs". On the Wilco cover, the writer claims it is "both fresh and respectful to the original".

== Track listing ==
All tracks stylised in all-lowercase.

No.	Title	Writer(s)	Length
1.	"In the Wake of Your Leave – Alternate"	David Le'aupepe; Donnie Berzestowski; Jung Kim; Max Dunn; Tom Hobden	3:58
2.	"Forbearance – Alternate"	Le'aupepe; Berzestowski; Kim; Dunn; Hobden	5:02
3.	"Spirit Boy – Alternate"	Le'aupepe; Berzestowski; Kim; Dunn; Hobden; Shane Mclean	5:53
4.	"Shot in the Arm"	Jay Bennett; Jeff Tweedy; John Stirratt	3:10
Total length:			18:05

== Personnel ==
Gang of Youths

- David Le'aupepe – vocals, rhythm guitar, writing
- Donnie Borzestowski – drums, writing
- Jung Kim – keyboards, writing
- Max Dunn – bass guitar, writing
- Tom Hobden – violin, writing

Other musicians

- Richard Woodcraft – engineer
- Nick Etwell – trumpet
