= Democracy Manifest =

1991 Australian viral video

Coordinates: 27°27′31″S 153°02′01″E

Surrounded by police, the then-unidentified Jack Karlson is surprised at being arrested in the video, exclaiming: "Gentlemen, this is democracy manifest!"

"Democracy Manifest" (also known as "Succulent Chinese Meal" and other names) is an Australian viral video and internet meme. It was recorded in 1991 for a news segment by the reporter Chris Reason and uploaded to the Internet in 2009. A number of uploads of the video exist on YouTube, with several having over a million views.

The video depicts a man being arrested by Queensland Police at a Chinese restaurant in Brisbane. As the police forcibly detain him, he remarks in a stentorian tone, "Gentlemen, this is democracy manifest!", "What is the charge? Eating a meal? A succulent Chinese meal?", "Get your hand off my penis!", and, after an aborted attempt by a police officer to headlock him, "I see that you know your judo well."

A mystery developed about who the man was and what the incident involved, with theories centering on the Hungarian dine-and-dasher Paul Charles Dozsa. In 2020, Australian citizen Jack Karlson (1942–2024) identified himself as the man in the video. He was being arrested in the video for allegedly having used a stolen credit card.

In 2019, The Guardian called the video "perhaps the preeminent Australian meme of the past 10 years." In 2026, it was selected for preservation by the Australian National Film and Sound Archive, in part because the original clip had amassed more than 15 million views.

== Synopsis ==
The video depicts the arrest of a middle-aged man outside a Chinese restaurant in Fortitude Valley, Brisbane. As officers are escorting him to a police car, the man begins to argue with them, saying that "You just assured me that I could speak." When told he is being placed under arrest, he exclaims, "I am under what?" A scuffle ensues as the man resists the officers' attempts to wrestle him into the car. During the struggle, the man looks past the camera and says, "Gentlemen, this is democracy manifest!" He comments on an officer's attempt at performing a headlock and briefly gestures towards a nearby man before shouting, "Get your hand off my penis! This is the bloke who got me on the penis before."

As the man is being handcuffed, he sarcastically asks the officers, "What is the charge? Eating a meal? A succulent Chinese meal?" He again comments on an officer's headlock attempt before addressing a man inside the vehicle, asking the latter, "Are you waiting to receive my limp penis?" At this point, an officer reaches down off-screen and presumably lifts the man's legs, allowing the others to lift him into the car feet first. The man says, "How dare ... get your hands off me." He then bids bystanders "Ta-ta and farewell!" as he is forced into the backseat of the car. Inside the vehicle, the man is heard saying, "One cuff, look! They even—" before being cut off as the car door closes.

== Search for identity ==
The video was filmed by the reporter Chris Reason for Seven News. Reason's report said that the man was arrested in a case of mistaken identity ("the police thought they'd caught Queensland's most wanted"). Other later sources said he was a dine-and-dasher or an international criminal. The police officer Dean Biron, who attended the scene, recalled he was wanted on 19 counts of fraud and receiving stolen goods worth AU$70,000. The man gave his name as Cecil George Edwards, but he had also been identified by aliases including Johann Kelmut Karlson and Cecil Gerry Edwards. The clip remained obscure until a raw video version was uploaded to the internet in January 2009 and became an immediate viral video. It was missing Reason's voice-over explaining who the man was and what the incident was about, and internet speculation attempted to resolve the mystery.

Theories about the man's identity centred on Paul Charles Dozsa, a Hungarian chess player and notorious dine-and-dasher, but there were also doubts about this theory. Observers asked why the arrest was filmed from so many angles, why it was filmed at all and why the allegedly Hungarian man did not sound Hungarian. Friends, family and acquaintances of Dozsa also denied he was the man in the video. Other theories included that the man was the politician John Bartlett, that the video was a skit from an unidentified television programme, or that the man was another dine-and-dasher, Gregory John Ziegler.

In 2020, the Australian punk band the Chats published a music video titled "Dine 'N Dash" that recreated the video with an actor. The actor identified himself in an interview with The Sydney Morning Herald as Cecil George Edwards, the man in the original video, now going by the name of "Jack K". Asked why he made such a show during the arrest, he said he wanted to appear crazy so he might be placed into an asylum where it would be easier to escape. It was also revealed he had an artistic career making paintings, including some of the arrest. That year, a man only identified as "Mr Democracy Manifest" was interviewed in a video regarding the incident for Sportsbet. In 2021 Seven News covered the story of the arrest, interviewing both Reason and the man arrested in the original video, who only gave his name as Jack. When asked for his surname, he jokingly replied, "It depends which one you want".

=== Jack Karlson ===
The footage depicts Jack Peter Karlson (born Cecil George Edwards; 6 August 1942 – 7 August 2024) being arrested for paying for a Chinese meal with a purportedly stolen credit card. He was being followed by an American Express investigator who identified him as a credit card fraudster and called the police. The incident took place at the China Sea Restaurant on 11 Duncan Street, Fortitude Valley. The restaurant has since relocated to Milton, Queensland.

Karlson began a lifelong career of petty crime in 1956 as a ward of Blackheath Presbyterian Boys' Home in the Brisbane suburb of Oxley, where he is alleged to have been subjected to physical and sexual abuse. He was in prison for much of the first half of his life and frequently escaped. In prison, he said he met the playwright Jim McNeil and encouraged him to write plays about his prison experience, which became famous throughout Australia. According to Karlson, they remained friends until McNeil's death in 1982.

The Radio National programme Earshot broadcast an hour-long biographical documentary on the incident in January 2022. In June 2022 the academic Dean Biron, who was one of the arresting officers accused in the "Get your hands off my penis" part of the video, wrote an article about the incident. Biron gave his version of events, such as why the police were making the arrest, stating that, contrary to other reports made, it was not considered a major case. Biron said that after the arrest, the man—who had used the Edwards alias—was held in police custody and then released on bail overnight, and disappeared until his "15 minutes of fame" in 2020, "somehow scrubbed clean of that pesky past".

In 2023 the true crime author Mark Dapin published a biography of Karlson titled Carnage: A Succulent Chinese Meal, Mr. Rent-a-Kill and the Australian Manson Murders that also explores his connections to other criminals. The book also revealed that Karlson was an admirer of Adolf Hitler and Nazism who would "indulge his Nazi fetish", use the expression "Two Heil Hitlers" instead of "three cheers" and had a car decorated with a Nazi swastika on his lawn. On at least one occasion he threw a party at his home to celebrate Hitler's birthday.

Karlson died of prostate cancer on 7 August 2024 at the age of 82. In the month before Karlson died, he and one of his arresting officers had been speaking with Australian media to promote a new documentary about the incident, The Man Who Ate a Succulent Chinese Meal, directed by Heath Davis.

== Analysis ==
In 2024, Terry Barnes wrote in The Spectator that Karlson was certainly being facetious when he referred to the meal as "succulent", as "Australian suburban Chinese cafés are legendary for their cheap but bland and tasteless food." Barnes stated that Karlson had become an online folk hero in Australia for resisting the heavy-handedness of police, a theme which resonated with the public during the COVID-19 pandemic; "for a time, we were all Jack Karlson."

Karlson later explained the meaning of the phrase "democracy manifest" as judgement by the people through the media: "Here's an opportunity to prove my innocence, because they've dragged me out, thinking I was some sort of international gangster, when I knew that I wasn't. Here's a chance, the camera, for the people of Australia and to let democracy manifest itself gloriously. That's why I carried on like that."

== Influence ==
Since being uploaded to YouTube in 2009, the video has become a viral hit in Australian culture. When the Australian activist Julian Assange was arrested at the Embassy of Ecuador, London, in 2019, comparisons were made between both respective arrests and "it didn't take long for Aussies to all make the same joke".

The American rapper Mac Miller (under his production alias Larry Fisherman) sampled the video in his 2015 instrumental mixtape Run-On Sentences, Volume Two. In 2019, an orchestral soundtrack to the footage was performed at a Sydney opera centre. The Australian horse racing trainer Chris Waller trains "Democracy Manifest", a horse owned by Steve Allam, most notable for winning the $150,000 Catanach Jewellers Handicap at Randwick Racecourse on 15 April 2023. The video is alluded to in the 2023 film Napoleon, in one scene of which Jean-François-Auguste Moulin is arrested and protests, "I am enjoying a succulent breakfast!"

Two episodes of the television series What We Do in the Shadows have referenced the meme. In the episode "P.I. Undercover: New York", the vampire Laszlo Cravensworth offers another character a "succulent Chinese meal" in stentorian tones similar to Karlson's, and in the following episode "Come Out and Play", Laszlo also quotes Karlson by saying "I see you know your judo" and "get your hands off me".

In British mockumentary The Life of Rock with Brian Pern, the footage was used as background for a protest song of progressive rock musician Brian Pern with his band Thotch, claiming that a John Bartlett had been arrested for refusing to eat his Chinese meal with chopsticks.

In 2019, The Guardian called the video "perhaps the pre-eminent Australian meme of the past 10 years".

In March 2026, the audio of Karlson's speech at the time of his arrest was added to the Sound of Australia Archive at the National Film and Sound Archive for preservation. "The NFSA stated that the video demonstrates how 'voice and performance can transform an everyday news event into a lasting piece of cultural folklore'." As the NFSA notes:

After a slow-burn journey from its initial niche audience to viral fame, the video now has an aggregated view count of almost 15 million views. When asked if he noticed when these numbers started to pick up, Furman points to the YouTube video I'm American (2013), in which popular content creator Ray William Johnson scours the internet looking for the next viral video. Johnson spotlights the clip as 'the best arrest I've ever seen in my life', comparing Karlson to 'a Shakespearean actor'. Shortly after, the views on Furman's original upload exploded from a handful to over 10,000. Daily viewership remained in the hundreds to low thousands over the next few years.

== See also ==
- Australian Chinese cuisine
