= Total Serene =

EP by Gang of Youths
- Released: 16 July 2021
- Length: 13:14
- Labels: Mosy Recordings; Sony Music Australia

Gang of Youths chronology
MTV Unplugged (Live in Melbourne) (2018)	Total Serene (2021)	Angel in Realtime (2022)

Singles from Total Serene
- 1. "The Angel of 8th Ave." Released: 15 June 2021; 2. "Unison" Released: 16 July 2021

Total Serene (stylised in all lowercase) is the second extended play by Australian alternative band Gang of Youths, released on 16 July 2021 via Mosy Recordings and Sony Music Australia. The EP was released without notice and is the first collection of new tracks from the band since their second album, Go Farther in Lightness (2017).

The EP features two original tracks and a cover of Elbow's "Asleep in the Back". David Le'aupepe explained its inclusion to the ABC saying, "We love Elbow and we thought it was thematically relevant."

== Singles ==
Total Serene was preceded by the single "The Angel of 8th Ave.", released on 15 June 2021. "The Angel of 8th Ave." debuted and peaked at number 48 on the ARIA Singles Chart, surpassing "Let Me Down Easy" (which peaked at number 49 in February 2018) as their highest peak in Australia.

Second single "Unison" was released the same day at the EP. Le'aupepe said upon the single's release "'Unison' is a deeply important track for us that really signals where the music is headed on the new record.".

== Track listing ==
No.	Title	Writer(s)	Length
1.	"The Angel of 8th Ave."	David Le'aupepe; Donnie Borzestowski; Jung Kim; Max Dunn; Tom Hobden	3:58
2.	"Asleep in the Back"	Craig Potter; Guy Garvey; Mark Potter; Pete Turner; Richard Jupp	4:08
3.	"Unison"	Le'aupepe; Borzestowski; Kim; Dunn; Hobden	5:08
Total length:			13:14

=== Notes ===
- All track titles are stylised in all lowercase.
