= Things Take Time =

2026 single by Gang of Youths

Single by Gang of Youths

from the album Compañero
- Released: 18 August 2026
- Recorded: London
- Length: 5:11
- Lyricist: David Le'aupepe
- Producer: Gang of Youths

Gang of Youths singles chronology
"Have Yourself a Merry Little Christmas" (2023)	"Things Take Time" (2026)

"Things Take Time" is a song by Australian alternative rock band Gang of Youths. The song was premiered during their Wollongong show on 6 August 2026 and previewed during two shows at the Sydney Opera House on 8 and 10 August 2026. It was released digitally on 18 August 2026.

Upon release Gang of Youths frontman David Le'aupepe spoke with NME saying, "When I wrote this song, I didn't want too much weighing it down, wanted the song to feel speedy and light, and we wanted that really groovy and flowing nature to shine through a little bit more. It felt really good." Le'aupepe added lyrically, "It's about growing plants. My wife ordered too many tomato seeds, so she went to work growing all of these tomatoes in our house. I go over to record with Tom [Hobden] at his home studio, and that overlooks his back garden. His wife Emma grows all these beautiful plants in the yard. It got me fascinated with the cycle of growth and death, and being baffled that people can grow things without killing them."

At the 2026 ARIA Music Awards it was nominated for Best Alternative Release and Best Group.

== Reception ==
Rachel Stone from Broadway World said "'Things Take Time' captures the depth, ambition and cinematic scale that have become hallmarks of Gang of Youths' sound." adding "The song meditates on patience, transformation and the cyclical nature of life, anchored by its refrain, 'All things take time'".

Neil Griffiths from Rolling Stone Australia said "Listening to 'Things Take Time', it's obvious that Gang of Youths' next chapter will be unlike anything that has come before."

Chris DeVille from StereoGum said "The track merges a musical lightness with emotional heaviness, leaning into the softer side of this group's sound and teasing out fresh dimensions through orchestral accompaniment. "

Mary Varvaris from The Music described it as a "jaunty, yacht rock-inspired new number" noting the "musing about finding heaven in the suburbs." Furthermore, it was the magazine's "power pick" (Note: A "power pick" is an Australian song chosen by magazine staff they think has the potential to be the next big Australian chart hit.) for the week 24 August 2026, with Tyler Jenke saying "In true Gang of Youths fashion, it's a powerful piece of work that tugs on the heartstrings as it plumbs the depth of emotional intensity, ruminating and meditation on topics such as patience, transformation and life's cyclical nature."

== Charts ==
Chart performance for "Things Take Time"
Chart (2026)	Peak position
Australian Artist (ARIA)	11
