= The Angel of 8th Ave. =

"The Angel of 8th Ave"

Single by Gang of Youths

from the EP Total Serene
- Released: 15 June 2021
- Length: 3:58
- Label: Mosy; Sony Music Australia; Warner
- Songwriter(s): David Le'aupepe; Donnie Borzestowski; Max Dunn; Tom Hobden; Jung Kim
- Producer(s): Gang of Youths

Gang of Youths singles chronology
"Fear and Trembling" (2018)	"The Angel of 8th Ave" (2021)	"Unison" (2021)

"The Angel of 8th Ave." (stylised the angel of 8th ave.) is a song by Australian alternative rock band Gang of Youths, released on 15 June 2021 as the lead single from their second EP, Total Serene (2021). The track also features on the band's third studio album, Angel in Realtime (2022). It was the band's first original release in four years, and was regarded by many outlets as their "comeback". Frontman David Le'aupepe said the song was inspired by "falling in love and finding a new life in a new city together."

It peaked at number 48 on the ARIA Singles Chart. At the 2021 ARIA Music Awards, the song earned the group a nomination for Best Group. At the APRA Music Awards of 2022, the song was nominated for Most Performed Rock Work.

== Music video ==
The music video was released on 16 June 2021. The video was directed by Joel Barney and filmed in the Angel area of London.

== Critical reception ==
Al Newstead from Triple J called it a "big, cathartic rock number." Emmy Mack from Music Feeds said, "it's made of the same poetic, life-affirming, retro-infused indie rock that fans have grown to know and love from Gang of Youths".

== Chart performance ==
On 23 June 2021, Australian Recording Industry Association (ARIA) released their mid-week chart report, which stated that the song was likely to debut within the top 50 on the ARIA Singles Chart later that week. On 25 June, "The Angel of 8th Ave." debuted and peaked at number 48 on the ARIA Singles Chart, surpassing "Let Me Down Easy" (which peaked at number 49 in February 2018) as their highest peak in the region.

== Credits and personnel ==
Gang of Youths

- David Le'aupepe – writing, vocals, rhythm guitar
- Jung Kim – keyboards, piano, guitar
- Max Dunn – bass guitar
- Donnie Borzestowski – drums
- Tom Hobden – violin, guitar, keyboards

== Charts ==
Chart performance for "The Angel of 8th Ave."
Chart (2021)	Peak position
Australia (ARIA)	48
US Adult Alternative Songs (Billboard)	7
US Alternative Airplay (Billboard)	29
