= ReWiggled =

2022 double album by The Wiggles and various artists

Studio album by the Wiggles and various artists
- Released: 11 March 2022
- Recorded: 2021
- Length: 80:54
- Label: ABC Music
- Producer: Anthony Field

The Wiggles albums chronology
Halloween Party (2021)	ReWiggled (2022)	Super Wiggles (2022)

Singles from ReWiggled
- 1. "Elephant (Like a version)" Released: 12 March 2021; 2. "Apple Crumble" Released: 28 January 2022; 3. "H.O.L.I.D.A.Y." Released: 25 February 2022

ReWiggled is a double album by Australian children's music band the Wiggles and various artists, released on 11 March 2022. Disc one is a tribute album of the Wiggles' songs reinterpreted by Australian artists and disc two is a studio album by the Wiggles themselves covering some of their all-time favourite songs. Both the current and original lineups of the group contribute to the covers on the second disc. ReWiggled marks the final Wiggles-related project that Emma Watkins was involved in, as she departed from the group a few months prior to the album's release.

The album was announced on 15 December 2021. In a press release, Anthony Field said: "It's been really enjoyable and also so humbling, hearing all these wonderful artists doing their versions of Wiggles songs – they're all so very talented. And it's been a real thrill to get back in the studio together with all the Wiggles – the current members and the OG's – to record some cover versions of our own". A five track sampler was released digitally on the same day.

ReWiggled debuted at number one on the ARIA Albums Chart, becoming the Wiggles' first number-one album in Australia.

The album won Best Children's Album at the 2022 ARIA Music Awards. It was also nominated for Best Record at the 2023 Shure Rolling Stones Australia Awards.

At the AIR Awards of 2023, the album was nominated for Best Independent Children's Album or EP. It was also nominated for Independent Marketing Team of the Year, with ABC Music and The Orchard, and Independent Publicity Team of the Year, with RPM and Bec Brown Communications.

== Track listing ==
Disc 1
No.	Title	Writer(s)	Artist	Length
1.	"Hot Potato"	Murray Cook; Jeff Fatt; Anthony Field; John Field; Greg Page	DZ Deathrays	1:15
2.	"D.O.R.O.T.H.Y (My Favourite Dinosaur)"	Cook; Fatt; Field; John Field; Page	Spacey Jane	2:13
3.	"H.O.L.I.D.A.Y."	Oliver Brian; Field; Lachlan Gillespie; Alex Keller; Simon Pryce; Emma Watkins	San Cisco	3:25
4.	"Apples & Bananas"	Trad	Polish Club	2:04
5.	"The Shimmie Shake"	John Field; Paul Field	Luca Brasi	1:25
6.	"We're All Fruit Salad!"	Brian; Cook; Lou Diamond Phillips; Fatt; Field; Gillespie; James Harkness; Jawan Jackson; Keller; Page; Pryce; Robert Rakete; Taylor Symone Jackson; Victor Valdes; Watkins	Melbourne Ska Orchestra	4:18
7.	"Ba Ba Da Bicycle Ride"	Field; Gillespie; Watkins	Stella Donnelly	1:55
8.	"Dressing Up"	Cook; Fatt; Field; John Field; Dominic Lindsay; Page	Emily Wurramara	2:40
9.	"Say the Dance, Do the Dance"	John Field	Emma Donovan & The Putbacks	2:46
10.	"Do the Propeller!"	Fatt; Field; John Field	Custard	2:02
11.	"Can You (Point Your Fingers and Do the Twist?)"	Cook; Fatt; Field; Page	The Chats	1:32
12.	"Sicily (I Want to Go)"	Cook; Fatt; Field; John Petrozzi; Page	Donny Benét	2:38
13.	"Big Red Car"	Cook; Fatt; Field; Page	Dami Im	2:21
Total length:				30:34

Disc 2
No.	Title	Writer(s)	Original artist	Length
1.	"Elephant (Like a Version)"	Kevin Parker; Jay Watson; Cook; Fatt; Field; Page	Tame Impala	3:22
2.	"Pub Feed"	Matt Boggis; Josh Price; Eamon Sandwith	The Chats	2:08
3.	"Brand New Key"	Melanie Safka	Melanie	2:32
4.	"Praise You"	Norman Cook; Camille Yarbrough	Fatboy Slim	3:51
5.	"We're Going to Be Friends"	Jack White	The White Stripes	2:25
6.	"Get on the Good Foot"	James Brown; Fred Wesley; Joseph Mims	James Brown	3:48
7.	"Shipping Up to Boston"	Woody Guthrie; Al Barr; Marc Orrell; James Lynch; Ken Casey; Matt Kelly	Dropkick Murphys	2:33
8.	"Thunderstruck"	Angus Young; Malcolm Young	AC/DC	6:31
9.	"Apple Crumble"	Dave K. Haddad; Oliver Leimbach; Louis Leimbach; Idris Elba	Lime Cordiale and Idris Elba	3:05
10.	"She's a Rainbow"	Mick Jagger; Keith Richards	The Rolling Stones	4:14
11.	"Umbrella" (Not featured on vinyl release)	Christopher Stewart; Terius Nash; Kuk Harrell; Shawn Carter	Rihanna featuring Jay-Z	3:42
12.	"Sunday Girl"	Chris Stein	Blondie	3:15
13.	"The Wellerman" (Not featured on vinyl release)	Trad	Nathan Evans	3:06
14.	"Bohemian Rhapsody"	Freddie Mercury	Queen	5:48
Total length:				50:20

== Charts ==
=== Weekly charts ===
Chart performance for ReWiggled
Chart (2022)	Peak position
Australian Albums (ARIA)	1

=== Year-end charts ===
Year-end chart performance for ReWiggled
Chart (2022)	Position
Australian Artist (ARIA)	33

== Release history ==
Release history for ReWiggled
Region	Date	Format	Label	Catalogue
Australia	11 March 2022	2×CD; digital download; streaming	ABC Music	ABCK0002
Australia	1 July 2022	2× limited LP	ABC Music	ABCK0002LP

== Awards and nominations ==
Award	Year	Recipient(s) and nominee(s)	Category	Result	Ref.
AIR Awards	2023	ReWiggled	Best Independent Children's Album or EP	Nominated	
AIR Awards	2023	ReWiggled	Independent Marketing Team of the Year with ABC Music and The Orchard	Nominated	
AIR Awards	2023	ReWiggled	Independent Publicity Team of the Year with RPM and Bec Brown Communications	Nominated	
ARIA Music Awards	2022	ReWiggled	Best Children's Album	Won	
Shure Rolling Stones Australia Awards	2023	ReWiggled	Best Record	Nominated	
