= In the Wake of Your Leave =

2022 single by Gang of Youths

- Cover art designed by Bradley Pinkerton

Single by Gang of Youths

from the album Angel in Realtime
- Released: 7 January 2022
- Genre: Alternative rock
- Length: 4:03
- Label: Mosy; Warner
- Songwriters: David Le'aupepe; Donnie Borzestowski; Jung Kim; Max Dunn; Tom Hobden
- Producers: Gang of Youths; Peter Hutchings; Peter Katis

Gang of Youths singles chronology
"Tend the Garden" (2021)	"In the Wake of Your Leave" (2022)	"Spirit Boy" (2022)

"In the Wake of Your Leave" is a song by Australian alternative rock band Gang of Youths, released on 7 January 2022 as the third single to their third studio album, Angel in Realtime (2022). It peaked at number 29 on Billboard's Adult Alternative Airplay chart, and was considered a favourite to top Triple J's Hottest 100 of 2022 poll, ending up at number 9. In May 2022, a re-recorded version of the track was released on their Immolation Tape EP.

== Background and release ==
The band's third studio album, Angel in Realtime, was announced on 10 November 2021, along with a track list, details of a worldwide tour, and "Tend the Garden", the album's second single following "The Man Himself" (October 2021). "In the Wake of Your Leave" was issued on 7 January 2022. Melbourne-based graphic designer Bradley Pinkerton, who handled the cover for earlier single "The Man Himself", produced the artwork for the track. On 18 April 2022, the band performed the track live on The Tonight Show Starring Jimmy Fallon.

On 20 May 2022, the band surprised released their third EP, Immolation Tape, containing a re-recorded version of "In the Wake of Your Leave". It was recorded in March at a SiriusXM studio in the United States for the station's Spectrum Sessions program.

== Composition ==
Musically, the track features backing harmonies from the Auckland Gospel Choir and percussion by drummers from the Cook Islands. The band further found inspiration for the track from Variations for Winds, Strings and Keyboards by Steve Reich. Le'aupepe reflected on the track's purpose upon release:

I wanted to reflect on how I became dependent on grief for solace and inspiration. The cycle from numbness to acceptance to yearning plays a role in my approach to grieving my dad’s death. As a result, most of the time, I feel a bit futile as a person.

Written about "the undulating rise and fall of grief in life and how you end up missing it when it’s gone", the band struggled with not wanting the song to sound generic, which they resolved by "adding layers and kind of making this big maximalist dreamscape".

== Reception ==
The song received highly positive reviews from critics. Tyler Jenke of Rolling Stone Australia wrote the track was "introspective in its writing, powerful in its message, and inescapable in its appeal", concluding "another majestic outing" from the band. Radio station Triple M wrote the song "burns with life-affirming, whole-hearted passion – from its exuberant rush to its bright, colossal melodies and its addictive, radio-friendly hook". The track was named Song of the Week by BBC Radio 1 presenter Greg James.

In January 2023, the song was considered a leading contender to win the Triple J Hottest 100, 2022.

== Music video ==
On 19 January 2022, the band premiered a music video for the track on YouTube. Filmed in three takes, it was directed by Joel Barney and choreographed by Antoine Thomas-Sturge. Tom Skinner of NME concluded the video "provides a dose of joyful escapism", following the performers as they "bust moves through a colourful, hyperreal version of London in homage to the golden age of the musical".

== Charts ==
Weekly chart performance for "In the Wake of Your Leave"
Chart (2022)	Peak position
UK Radio Airplay	36
US Adult Alternative Airplay (Billboard)	29

== Release history ==
Release dates and formats for "In the Wake of Your Leave"
Region	Date	Format(s)	Label(s)	Ref.
United States	January 24, 2022	Adult alternative radio	Warner	
United States	January 25, 2022	Alternative radio	Warner	
