= The Chats =

Australian punk rock band

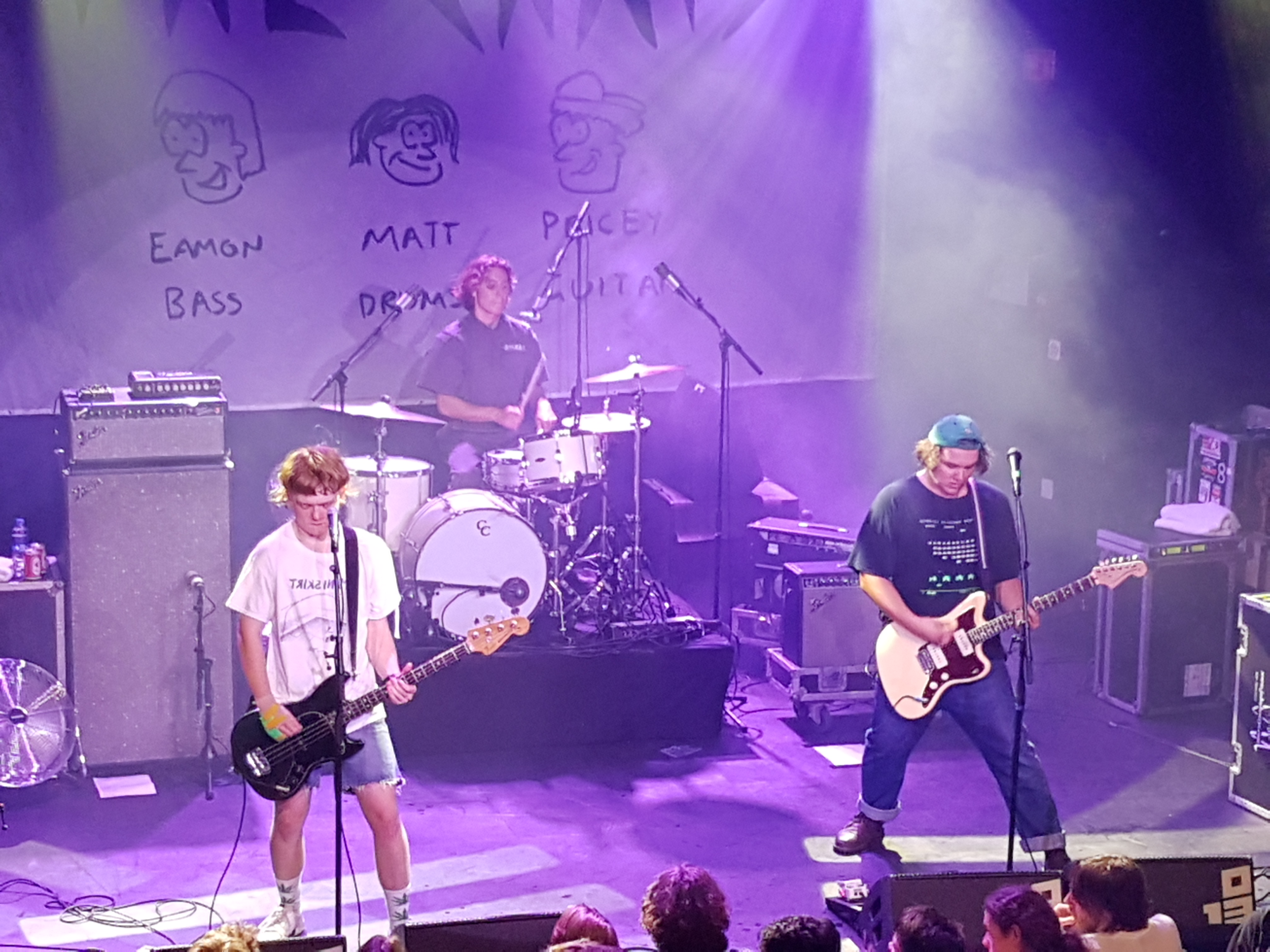
- Original lineup of the Chats in 2019

Background information
- Origin: Sunshine Coast, Queensland, Australia
- Genres: Punk rock; garage punk
- Works: The Chats discography
- Years active: 2016–present
- Label: Bargain Bin
- Members: "Flamin’" Eamon Sandwith; Matt Boggis; Josh Hardy
- Past members: Tremayne McCarthy; Josh Price
- Website: thechatslovebeer.com

The Chats are an Australian punk rock band that formed in 2016 in the Sunshine Coast, Queensland. They describe their sound as "shed rock". The current band lineup is composed of guitarist Josh Hardy, drummer Matt Boggis, and bassist and vocalist Eamon Sandwith. Known for their songs about Australian culture, they initially went viral for their song "Smoko" and its music video in 2017, and later with "Pub Feed" in 2019. To date they have released two EPs, The Chats (2016) and Get This in Ya!! (2017), and two studio albums High Risk Behaviour (2020) and Get Fucked (2022).

== History ==
=== 2016: Early years and debut EP ===
Josh Price, Matt Boggis and Eamon Sandwith met in music class at St. Teresa's Catholic College in Noosaville, Queensland. When they were 17, in September 2016, they formed the Chats, with Price on guitar and vocals, Boggis on drums, and Sandwith on bass and vocals. They were joined by schoolmate Tremayne McCarthy in the original lineup, who alternated between guitar and bass. The band takes its name from the phrase "that's chat" – an Australian slang term to describe something gross, disgusting or otherwise bad.

Their debut self-titled EP, recorded at another local high school, was released on 7 November 2016. Triple J described the EP as "seven joyous sky-punching tracks that combined 60s garage punk and 70s new wave punk".

=== 2017: Get This in Ya!! ===
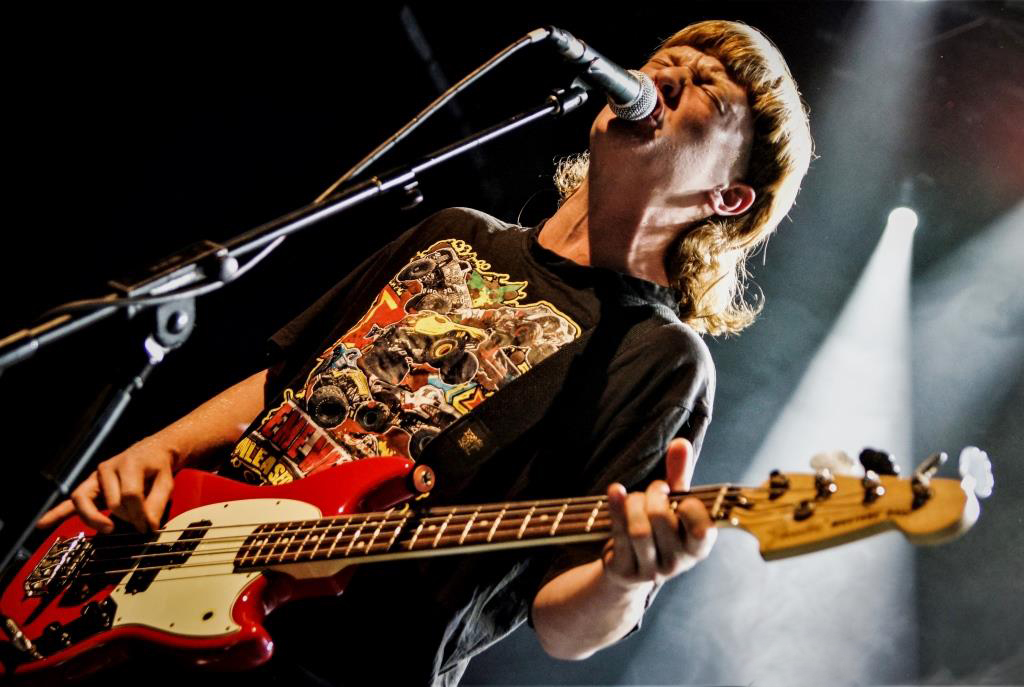
Lead vocalist and bassist Eamon Sandwith performing live with the Chats in 2017

The band's second EP, Get This in Ya!! was released on 31 July 2017, and was described by Scoop as "another thrilling seven-song slice of economic, stripped-down, early Buzzcocks-styles punk tension". It was tracked/recorded at Eleven PM Studios in Nambour, Queensland, Australia, by Finn Wegener and Michael Currie on 24 June 2017. Michael Currie, the EP's producer, decided that the best way to record the band was all in the same room together live. Only very minimal overdubbing was done. It was then mixed and mastered by Currie at his Polished Turd Studios in Brisbane. The music video for the track "Smoko", filmed with no budget at a building site, was directed by Matisse Langbein, who also did the cover art for the EP, and was released on 3 October. The video subsequently went viral on YouTube, drawing the attention of musicians such as Dave Grohl, Josh Homme, Iggy Pop and Alex Turner. Triple J described the song as "an instant classic of a youth anthem on a par with 'You Really Got Me', 'My Generation' or 'Teenage Kicks'".

=== 2018–2020: Universal signing and High Risk Behaviour ===
In the Spring of 2018 the band supported Cosmic Psychos on their Loudmouth Soup Tour. On 3 July 2018, the Chats released the single "Do What I Want", announced to be included in their forthcoming studio album.

The band signed a global deal with Universal Music Publishing Australia on 19 March 2019, and founded their own label, Bargain Bin Records. Their distribution is handled by Cooking Vinyl Australia. On 21 March, the Chats released "Pub Feed" alongside an accompanying music video. Throughout July, the band toured the United States. On 26 July, they released the single "Identity Theft" alongside an accompanying music video, which contains references to the video game Guitar Hero. The band performed at the UK Reading and Leeds Festivals in August. In October, the Chats commenced an Australian national tour. The band performed a headlining tour in the UK during December 2019. When asked about the then-untitled High Risk Behaviour during an interview at the Reading Festival, Sandwith revealed that the songs were already recorded: "We're gonna call it done...we're not perfectionists or anything.".

In late-December, Sandwith posted a song criticizing Prime Minister Scott Morrison for his perceived apathy and carelessness towards the 2019-20 bushfire crisis to Instagram, titled "I Hope Scott's House Burns Down"; according to Pedestrian.tv, the song was used to aid fundraising efforts for numerous volunteer firefighter groups. The band released the single "The Clap" on 17 January 2020 and revealed the name of their debut studio album, High Risk Behaviour, as well as a release date of 27 March. On 6 March, weeks before its release, the band released the single "Dine & Dash" and its accompanying music video starring Jack Karlson. Their debut album peaked at number 5 on the ARIA Charts, and was met with positive reception. The Guardian rated it four stars, noting that it was "exhilarating, cheerily undemanding fun, something in scant supply at the moment.” The album also garnered a ARIA Award nomination for Best Hard Rock or Heavy Metal Album.

=== 2020–present: Price's departure, Get Fucked and side projects ===
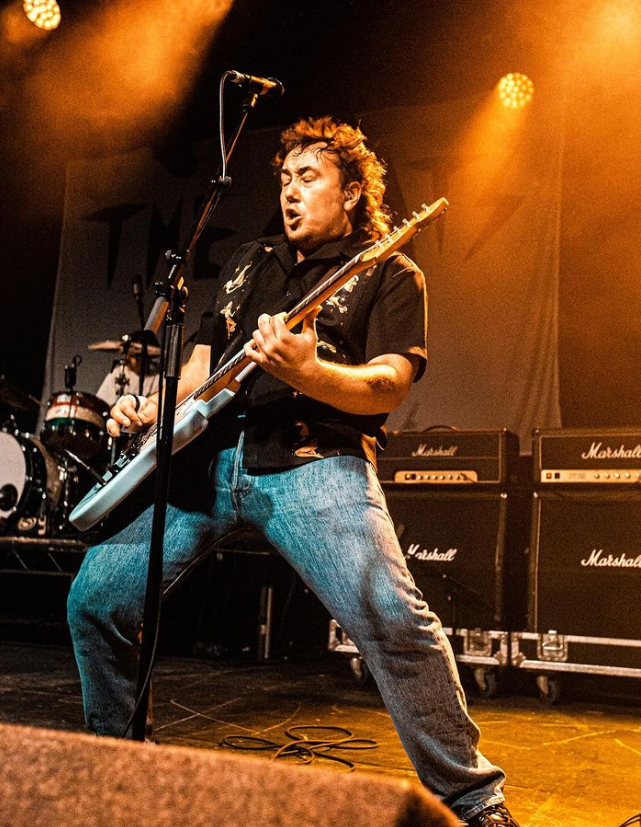
Guitarist Josh Hardy, performing live with The Chats 2022.

On 8 November, the band released the single, "AC/DC CD", a tribute to the Australian band AC/DC. Guitarist Josh Price was not featured in the song's music video, but Josh Hardy of Australian band The Unknowns was instead. In December, the band officially confirmed Price's departure, and announced Hardy as his replacement.

On 10 September 2021, the band released a cover of Metallica's "Holier Than Thou" for the charity tribute album The Metallica Blacklist. This was followed in December by another cover version, The Wiggles' "Can You Point Your Fingers (And Do the Twist?)", as part of the Wiggles tribute album ReWiggled. The Wiggles simultaneously shared a cover of The Chats' "Pub Feed", which would appear on the album's second disc.

In November of 2021, the Chats embarked on a lengthy tour playing dates in Australia and Europe that lasted until March 31, 2022. Also in November of 2021, Sandwith joined The Unknowns as a second guitarist.

In March 2022, the band shared the single "Struck by Lightning". In May, the band announced their second studio album Get Fucked, released on 19 August 2022. The announcement came with the release of the album's second single, "6L GTR". This album charted even higher than their previous on the ARIA Charts, debuting at number 2. The album was met with positive reception, and won the band their first ARIA Award for Best Hard Rock or Heavy Metal Album.

In April 2022, they embarked on a U.S./Canada tour with Mean Jeans which lasted until May 27.

In March 2023, The Unknowns released their second album, East Coast Low, named after the Australian east coast low, on The Chats' label, Bargain Bin Records.

In May and June 2023, the band embarked on a EU/UK tour. The band then returned to North America for a headlining tour that started in September.

In early 2024, the band headlined the Bargain Bin 2024 tour alongside Mean Jeans, The Prize, Ghoulies, The Unknowns and Boondall Boys. In late 2024, the band returned to Europe for another headlining tour.

Following a break in the band's schedule, which saw Hardy recording an EP released on Bargain Bin Records with his project Loose Lips entitled Last Laugh, and Sandwith playing bass for Brisbane band Shock Value on their Melbourne tour, The Chats toured across Australia across July and August 2025. Also in August 2025, The Unknowns released their third album, Looking from the Outside, on Bargain Bin Records. Also that month, The Chats returned to Europe, playing a number of festivals across mainland Europe and two nights at The Academy in Dublin, culminating in their second appearance at the Reading Festival in the United Kingdom. Shortly following this, the band also played at the Ohana Festival in Dana Point, California. That November, a tour of Japan and all remaining dates in 2025 were either cancelled or rescheduled due to Sandwith sustaining an injury.

In March 2026, The Chats embarked on a U.S. tour with The Hives, and played an acclaimed set at that year's Coachella in April following the conclusion of the tour.

In October 2026, The Chats released their first new single in four years, "Off It". An accompanying music video was also shared, starring former Neighbours actor Sally-Anne Upton. With the single's release came the announcement of their third studio album, Half Cut, as well as the announcement of an Australian tour the following month.

== Musical style and influences ==
The band coined the term "shed rock" to describe their sound, and their self-contained approach has been likened to that of King Gizzard & the Lizard Wizard. They cited Australian bands Cosmic Psychos, Dune Rats and Eddy Current Suppression Ring as major influences.

== Band members ==
=== Current members ===
- Eamon Sandwith – lead vocals, bass guitar (2016–present)
- Matthew Boggis – drums, backing vocals (2016–present)
- Joshua Hardy – guitar, backing vocals (2020–present)

=== Former members ===
- Tremayne "Mayno" McCarthy – guitar, bass, backing vocals (2016–2017)
- Josh "Pricey" Price – guitar, backing and occasional lead vocals (2016–2020)

== Discography ==
- High Risk Behaviour (2020)
- Get Fucked (2022)
- Half Cut (2027)

== Awards and nominations ==
=== AIR Awards ===
The Australian Independent Record Awards (commonly known informally as AIR Awards) is an annual awards night to recognise, promote and celebrate the success of Australia's Independent Music sector.

Year	Nominee / work	Award	Result	Ref.
2021	High Risk Behaviour	Best Independent Punk Album or EP	Won	

=== APRA Awards ===
The APRA Awards are held in Australia and New Zealand by the Australasian Performing Right Association to recognise songwriting skills, sales and airplay performance by its members annually.

Year	Nominee / work	Award	Result	Ref.
2023	"Struck By Lightning" (Matthew Boggis / Joshua Hardy / Eamon Sandwith)	Most Performed Rock Work of the Year	Won	

=== ARIA Music Awards ===
The ARIA Music Awards is an annual awards ceremony held by the Australian Recording Industry Association.

Year	Nominee / work	Award	Result	Ref.
2020	High Risk Behaviour	Best Hard Rock or Heavy Metal Album	Nominated	
2020	"The Clap"	Best Video	Nominated	
2022	Get Fucked	Best Hard Rock or Heavy Metal Album	Won	

=== J Awards ===
The J Awards are an annual series of Australian music awards that were established by the Australian Broadcasting Corporation's youth-focused radio station Triple J. They commenced in 2005.

Year	Nominee / work	Award	Result	Ref.
2019	"Identity Theft"	Australian Video of the Year	Nominated	
2019	The Chats	Unearthed Artist of the Year	Nominated	

=== National Live Music Awards ===
The National Live Music Awards (NLMAs) commenced in 2016 to recognise contributions to the live music industry in Australia.

Year	Nominee / work	Award	Result	Ref.
2019	The Chats	Best New Act	Nominated	

=== Rolling Stone Australia Awards ===
The Rolling Stone Australia Awards are awarded annually in January or February by the Australian edition of Rolling Stone magazine for outstanding contributions to popular culture in the previous year.

Year	Nominee / work	Award	Result	Ref.
2021	The Chats	Rolling Stone Reader's Award	Nominated	
