= Get This in Ya!! =

EP by The Chats
- Released: 31 July 2017
- Recorded: 24 June 2017
- Studio: Eleven PM Studios
- Genre: Punk rock
- Length: 18:49
- Label: Independent
- Producer: Fin Wegener

The Chats chronology
The Chats (2016)	Get This in Ya!! (2017)	High Risk Behaviour (2020)

Singles from Get This in Ya!!
- 1. "Smoko" Released: 14 August 2017

Professional ratings
Review scores
Source	Rating
AllMusic	3.5/5 stars

Get This in Ya!! is the second EP released by Australian punk rock band the Chats. It was released on Bandcamp on 31 July 2017 and physically released on 30 August 2019. It is the band's last EP before the release of their first studio album High Risk Behavior in March 2020. The EP spawned the single "Smoko", which together with its music video garnered popularity on the internet, accumulating more than 1.5 million YouTube views and almost 500,000 streams on audio platforms.

== Critical reception ==
Matt Collar of AllMusic gave the album three and a half stars, calling it "youthful, fun and furiously delivered" and citing 'Smoko' the highlight of the EP.

== Track listing ==
All tracks are written by The Chats.

Get This in Ya!! track listing
No.	Title	Length
1.	"Smoko"	3:00
2.	"Nambored"	1:50
3.	"How Many Do You Do"	2:24
4.	"Bus Money"	2:30
5.	"Casualty"	0:54
6.	"Nazi March"	1:20
7.	"Temperature"	2:51
8.	"Jam Sandwich" (heaps secret bonus track)	2:00
Total length:		18:49

Notes

- "Nazi March" is listed as "Left Right" by some online music streaming services such as Spotify.

== Personnel ==
=== Musicians ===
The Chats

- Eamon Sandwith — lead vocals, bass guitar, writing (1–8)
- Matt Boggis — drums, backing vocals, writing (1–8)
- Josh Price — guitar, backing vocals, lead vocals, writing (1–8)
- Tremayne McCarthy — bass guitar, backing vocals (on at least track 1)
