= Angel in Realtime =

2022 studio album by Gang of Youths

Studio album by Gang of Youths
- Released: 25 February 2022
- Studios: Eastcote, London; Hoxa HQ, London; The Pool, London; Urchin, London; Roundhead, Auckland
- Genre: Alternative rock
- Length: 67:03
- Labels: Mosy; Warner; Sony
- Producers: Gang of Youths; Peter Hutchings; Peter Katis

Gang of Youths chronology
Total Serene (2021)	Angel in Realtime (2022)	Immolation Tape (2022)

Singles from Angel in Realtime
- 1. "The Man Himself" Released: 7 October 2021; 2. "Tend the Garden" Released: 10 November 2021; 3. "In the Wake of Your Leave" Released: 7 January 2022; 4. "Spirit Boy" Released: 23 February 2022

Angel in Realtime (Note: Stylised as angel in realtime.) is the third studio album by Australian alternative rock band Gang of Youths, released on 25 February 2022 through Mosy Recordings. Written over the four years following the death of frontman David Le'aupepe's father, the album lyrically focuses on the emotions that arise from mourning, coming to terms with loss, and discovering family identity in the Pacific Islands. It consistently uses vocal and instrumental samples from Indigenous musicians collected by explorer David Fanshawe, marking a significant sonic departure from their previous album, Go Farther in Lightness (2017).

Supported by a world tour commencing in Dublin in March 2022, Angel in Realtime became the band's second album to debut at number one on the ARIA Albums Chart. The album was lauded by many critics, who particularly praised the lyricism and storytelling. Multiple outlets recognised it as the band's best work, however some found issue with the length and density. Angel in Realtime was nominated for Album of the Year, Best Group and Best Rock Album at the 2022 ARIA Music Awards, while winning Australian Album of the Year at the J Awards.

Angel in Realtime was preceded by four singles, as well as "Unison" and "The Angel of 8th Ave." from Gang of Youths' second EP, Total Serene (2021). The latter track polled at number six in the Triple J Hottest 100 of 2021, while the third single "In the Wake of Your Leave" reached number eight in the 2022 countdown. Three of the album's tracks would later be re-recorded as part of the band's following EP, Immolation Tape (2022).

== Background ==
Following the release of their second studio album Go Farther in Lightness (2017), Gang of Youths relocated to London. In 2018, Teleso Le'aupepe, the father of frontman David, died of cancer. On his deathbed, he hinted that there were a number of secrets to be discovered in Polynesia – a surprise to his family, as Le'aupepe had always been insistent of his upbringing in New Zealand before settling in Sydney. David Le'aupepe and his wife travelled to Samoa, where it was revealed his father had disappeared to Australia in the 1970s, leaving behind two sons. This story is later recited in the album's piano ballad, "Brothers".

In 2019, founding member and guitarist Joji Malani amicably left the band. The following year, multi-instrumentalist Tom Hobden of Noah and the Whale joined as violinist. In July 2021, the band surprise released their second EP Total Serene, containing three tracks. Two of them – "The Angel of 8th Ave." (June) and "Unison" – would be included on Angel in Realtime. The former debuted at number 48 on the ARIA Singles Chart, and would later poll at number six in the Triple J Hottest 100 of 2021. Total Serene was the first collection of new music from Gang of Youths since Go Farther in Lightness.

== Production and recording ==
Angel in Realtime was recorded in various countries and took four years to complete. It was primarily self-produced at the band's studio in London, however Peter Hutchings and Peter Katis are also credited for production on two tracks – Katis had mixed their first two albums. With Le'aupepe as lead songwriter, the other band members had not heard the bulk of the lyricism until the final two weeks recording – he finished writing "Goal of the Century" the morning it was due to be produced.

Sonically, the album relies heavily on samples of Indigenous music from the Pacific Islands, collected by English explorer and composer David Fanshawe. The band received permission from David's wife to use the recordings. Lead single "The Man Himself" employs recordings of an Imene tuki, a polyrhythmic hymn, from Mangaia in the Cook Islands. "In the Wake of Your Leave" features backing harmonies from the Auckland Gospel Choir and percussion by a number of drummers from the island, while "Spirit Boy" interpolates musician Shane McLean "speaking a Kōrero poem in the track's breakdown before it gets swept up into string-laden revelry".

"The Man Himself"
The chorus of "The Man Himself" finds Le'aupepe struggling to come to terms with the loss of his father. It interpolates recordings by David Fanshawe of voices from people of Mangaia.

"Spirit Boy"
The interlude of "Spirit Boy" features Shane McLean recite a speech in Te Reo in-between verses performed by Le'aupepe in English.

Penultimate track "Hand of God" transitions into "Goal of the Century" – referencing Diego Maradona's suite of goals at the 1986 World Cup. The former features only Le'aupepe on vocals and piano with the gospel choir, while the resplendent final track hosts over a dozen guest musicians as well as the Budapest Film Orchestra on strings.

The album has been described by music outlets as alternative rock, with elements of chamber pop, Britpop and Indigenous music. Some have also called Angel in Realtime a concept album. Andrew Tendell of NME noted a sonic shift compared to Go Farther in Lightness, writing the release of "The Angel of 8th Ave." was "marking a transition into their new sound", being their only new song that "sounds anything like [their] previous album".

== Lyricism ==
Lyrically, many of the tracks are dedicated to the life of Le'aupepe's father. "Tend the Garden" is about Teleso's work as a "gifted and passionate gardener", and is written from his perspective, hinting at secrets that would be revealed after his death. Le'aupepe wrote "The Man Himself" regarding the struggles in going through the normalities of life without the guidance of his father. "Brothers" features only the frontman on vocals and piano, reciting the story of discovering his family who had been left behind in Samoa, and coming to terms with his father's deceit. "In the Wake of Your Leave" more broadly discusses grief – when writing, Le'aupepe said: "I wanted to reflect on how I became dependent on grief for solace and inspiration. The cycle from numbness to acceptance to yearning plays a role in my approach to grieving my dad's death."

Not all tracks continue these lyrical themes – "The Angel of 8th Ave." chronicles Le'aupepe's relocation to the Angel, Islington and meeting his future wife while in New York City. "Returner" is written about Le'aupepe's mental state after performing "21 gigs in 30 days in Australia, on this kind of record run, which I consider a shame and a blight because I wish I could have been my very best". Regarding the song's title, the frontman explained, "It's called 'returner' because my fucking job as a musician is to fucking yield returns."

== Release and promotion ==
Gang of Youths (left to right): Donnie Borzestowski, Jung Kim, Max Dunn and David Le'aupepe; performing at Fighting Cocks, Kingston, England, February 2022

"The Man Himself" was released as the album's lead single on 7 October 2021. The track would later poll at number 57 in the Triple J Hottest 100 of 2021. Angel in Realtime was officially announced on 10 November 2021, along with a track list, details of a worldwide tour, and "Tend the Garden", the album's second single. The artwork, designed by Bradley Pinkerton, was also issued, featuring the passport photo of Teleso. In December 2021, Gang of Youths performed "The Angel of 8th Ave." live on The Late Show with Stephen Colbert. "In the Wake of Your Leave" was released as the third single on 7 January 2022, followed by "Spirit Boy" on 22 February 2022. The former track would later poll at number eight in the Hottest 100 of 2022. Upon the release of Angel in Realtime on 25 February 2022, it debuted at number one on the ARIA Albums chart, becoming the band's second release to do so. The album also appeared at number six on the Scottish albums chart, and at number 10 in the United Kingdom.

At the 2022 ARIA Music Awards, Angel in Realtime was nominated for Album of the Year, Best Group and Best Rock Album. At the 2022 J Awards, it won Australian Album of the Year. Three of the album's tracks, "In the Wake of Your Leave", "Forbearance" and "Spirit Boy", were re-recorded in March 2022 and released on the band's succeeding EP Immolation Tape. Furthermore, Gang of Youths performed "Forbearance" on Jimmy Kimmel Live in May. On 5 August 2022, the band performed "Brothers" live for Like a Version – the performance later featured on their fourth EP, Triple J Like a Version Sessions (2022).

== Tour ==
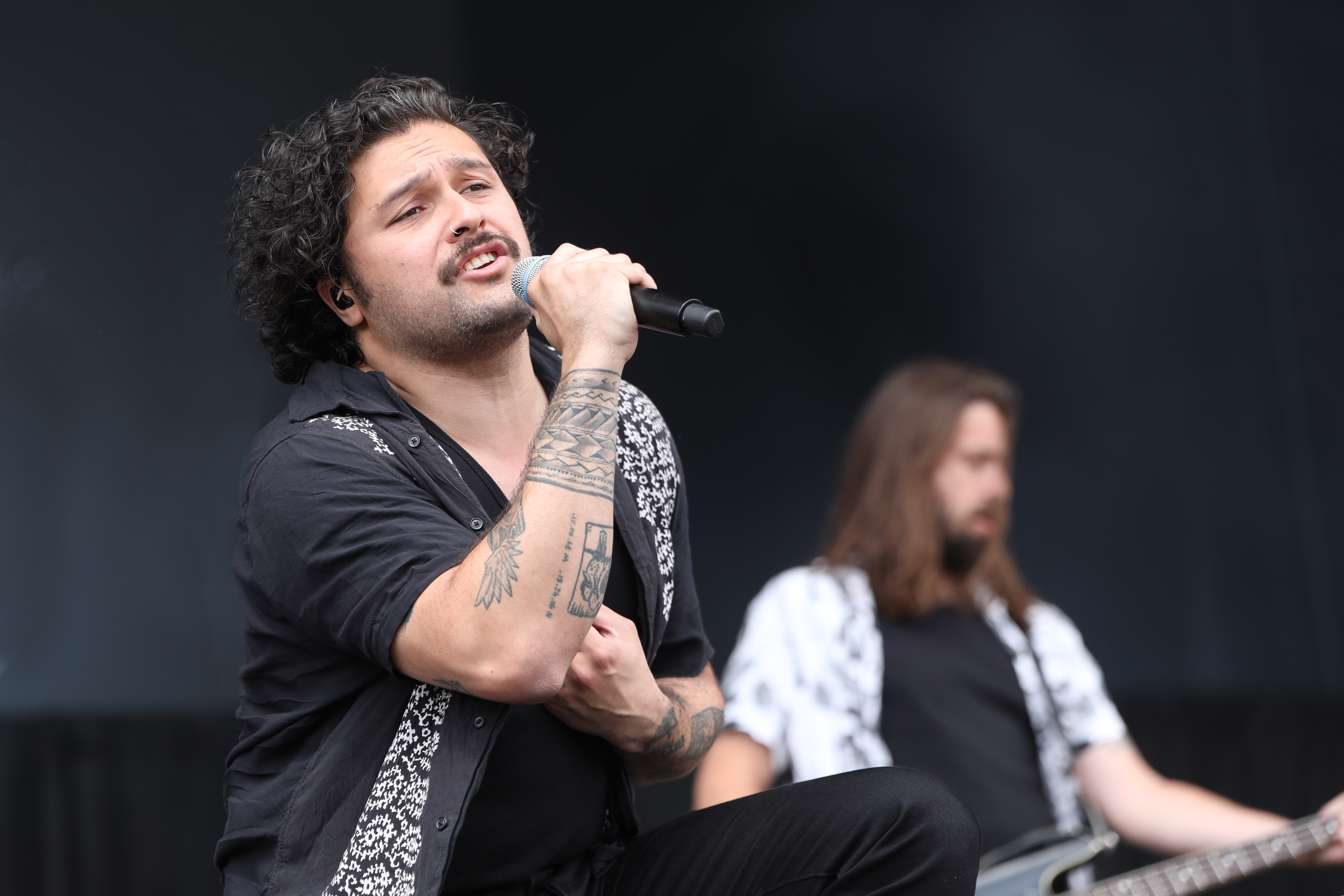
Gang of Youths performing at Rock im Park, Nuremberg in 2022, during the Angel in Realtime Tour.

Gang of Youths embarked on the Angel in Realtime Tour in Dublin on 3 March 2022. The first leg originally contained European dates, which were all later postponed to October through to November due to COVID-19 restrictions. Due to electrical issues, the Philadelphia show transitioned to an acoustic set with only Le'aupepe and Hobden performing. The final show in the third leg, at the Enmore Theatre in Sydney, was advertised as an "intimate acoustic performance" and was notably attended by Australian Prime Minister Anthony Albanese. The entire fourth leg in North America was cancelled due to health issues relating to Le'aupepe, but the fifth and final leg across Europe resumed.

The tour was acclaimed by a number of reviewers. Writing for The Music, Christopher Lewis praised Le'aupepe as "the best rock'n'roll performer this country has produced since Michael Hutchence". Al Newstead, reviewing for Triple J, called the band's Perth show an "epic stage production" that finished with a "triumphant encore of the record's epic two-part closer".

Overview of Angel in Realtime Tour dates and locations
Leg	Region	First show date	Last show date	No. of shows	Ref.
1	UK, Ireland	3 March 2022	15 March 2022	8	
2	North America	21 April 2022	24 May 2022	20	
3	Australia	30 July 2022	3 August 2022	9	
4	North America	13 September 2022	1 October 2022	Cancelled	
5	Europe	25 October 2022	20 November 2022	17	

== Critical reception ==
Professional ratings
Aggregate scores
Source	Rating
Metacritic	76/100
Review scores
Source	Rating
AllMusic	4.5/5 stars
Dork	4/5 stars
Exclaim!	9/10
The Guardian	3/5 stars
The Line of Best Fit	5/10
NME	4/5 stars
Pitchfork	6.8/10
Riff Magazine	10/10
Rolling Stone	4/5 stars

Angel in Realtime was released to widespread acclaim. At Metacritic, which assigns a normalised score out of 100 from the ratings of publications, the album received a score of 76 based on 10 reviews.

The album received high praise for its lyricism. Writing for Dork, Josh Williams described the album as "a truly great record that doesn't hold back on its emotions or its storytelling". Matt Collar of AllMusic shared a similar sentiment, commending the album's themes and noting it as a "deeply personal and autobiographical album, but one filled with a universally relatable emotionality". For Riff Magazine, Ben Schultz gave the album a perfect score, calling it "deeply personal yet all-embracing in spirit" and being an "early contender for best album of the year". Rhys Buchanan of NME called the album "some of their finest work so far", writing: "Not only does Angel in Realtime serve as a soul-stirring tribute to Le'aupepe's late father, but it's also a triumphant exploration of love and life." Many outlets agreed Angel in Realtime was the band's best work; Corbin Reiff of Spin referred to it as a "maximalist rock opus" and "their best record yet ... one that sets them up for greater success to come". Adam Feibel of Exclaim! praised Le'aupepe's storytelling, calling the album a "profoundly beautiful, meaningful album from a band that has decided that every record might as well be a new magnum opus".

Some reviewers were critical of the album's tightness. Bernard Zuel of The Guardian wrote "for much of the album, air to breathe is rare", but praised its lyricism, continuing "it is not a coincidence that the special moments on Angel in Realtime are the ones that best match the album's particularly personal story". Writing for Pitchfork, Shaad D'Souza claimed the album was "occasionally so dense that it's hard to listen to, with layers of interesting ideas compounded to something impenetrable" – also finding fault with its 67-minute duration. Andrew Burton of The Line of Best Fit criticised its lyrics that "come off basic and moralizing with lines of saccharine fluff" and claimed "far too many spots on Angel in Realtime are bland, generic, and overly sentimental".

=== Accolades ===
Angel in Realtime was featured several times in various music publications' year-end lists. Citing its "musical power", Riff Magazine named it the best album of 2022, due to "how it made listeners feel, and probably will feel, for years". Australian radio station Double J placed the album at number five in their year-end countdown, summarising it as a "remarkable story of multiple lives". Angel in Realtime was also featured in the lists of publications Esquire, Exclaim! and PopMatters.

Year-end lists for Angel in Realtime
Publication	Accolade	Rank	Ref.
The Alternative	50 Best Releases of 2022	25	
Double J	50 Best Albums of 2022	5	
Esquire	25 Best Albums of 2022	—N/a	
Exclaim!	50 Best Albums of 2022	40	
PopMatters	80 Best Albums of 2022	36	
Riff Magazine	67 Best Albums of 2022	1	
Sputnikmusic	Staff's Top 50 Albums of 2022	11	

== Track listing ==
All tracks written by Donnie Borzestowski, Max Dunn, Tom Hobden, Jung Kim and David Le'aupepe; "Spirit Boy" co-written by Shane McLean.

1. "You in Everything" – 6:51
2. "In the Wake of Your Leave" – 4:03
3. "The Angel of 8th Ave." – 3:59
4. "Returner" – 4:43
5. "Unison" – 5:08
6. "Tend the Garden" – 4:27
7. "The Kingdom Is Within You" – 4:23
8. "Spirit Boy" – 6:27
9. "Brothers" – 5:54
10. "Forbearance" – 5:38
11. "The Man Himself" – 4:24
12. "Hand of God" – 4:03
13. "Goal of the Century" – 7:03

Notes

- All track titles are stylised in all-lowercase.
- "The Angel of 8th Ave." and "Unison" previously appeared on the band's 2021 EP Total Serene.

Sample credits

- "You in Everything" contains samples from "Fatu Iva Chant, Marquesas Islands", "Hawaiian Hula Drums", "Conche Horns of Rano Kau, Rapa Nui, Easter Island" and "Chiefs and Orators 2 from Upolu, Samoa" from Fanshawe's South Pacific Collection 1 (1999).
- "Returner" contains samples from "Ute - Cutting Nuts, Aitutaki, Cook Is." from Fanshawe's Spirit of Polynesia (1995), "Himene Tarava Tamarii Tipaerui, Papa'ete, Tahiti" from Fanshawe's Heiva I Tahiti (2014) and "Vailoa Mens Chant, Savai'i, Samoa", also recorded by Fanshawe.
- "Unison" contains samples from "Himene Tarava 1, Group Tauraatua, Tahiti" from Spirit of Polynesia and "Himene Tarava Taunoa, Tahiti" from Fanshawe's Pacific Chants – Polynesian Himene (2002).
- "Tend the Garden" contains samples from "Muli tu pe, Mu'a, Tongatapu" from Music of the South Pacific, Nonesuch Explorer Series (2005) and "Utete Mouth Harps of 'Eua, Tongatapu" from Fanshawe's Chants of the Kingdom of Tonga (2008).
- "The Kingdom is Within You" contains a sample from "Imene Tuki Penrhyn, Tongareva, Cook Is." from Pacific Chants – Polynesian Himene.
- "Forbearance" contains samples from "Poipoi - Taro Pounding, Rapa, Austral Is" and "Bird Dance Hula, O'ahu, Hawai'i" from Spirit of Polynesia.
- "Goal of the Century" contains a sample from "Himene Tarava Pīr'e, Pape'ete, Tahiti" from Pacific Chants – Polynesian Himene.

== Personnel ==
Sampling and personnel credits adapted from liner notes.

Gang of Youths

- David Le'aupepe – lead vocals (all tracks), guitar (1–3, 5–6, 8, 10), bass guitar (3), piano (2–3, 9, 12–13), keys (7), backing vocals (6–7, 10), additional instrumentation (13)
- Donnie Borzestowski – drums (1–8, 10–11, 13), percussion (1–2, 4–8, 10, 13), piano (1, 8, 10), keys (7), backing vocals (5–8, 10–11, 13), additional instrumentation (8, 13)
- Max Dunn – bass guitar (1–2, 4–8, 10–11, 13), banjo (1, 5), piano (1, 4, 6, 8), keys (7), guitar (3, 7–8), backing vocals (10), additional instrumentation (8, 13)
- Tom Hobden – piano (7, 11, 13), keys (7), violin (1–8, 10–11, 13), viola (1–2, 4–8, 10–11, 13), string arrangements (1, 4, 7–8, 10, 13), woodwind and brass arrangements (13), additional instrumentation (10)
- Jung Kim – piano (3, 10), keys (1, 3, 4, 7, 13), guitar (1–8, 10–11), backing vocals (10), additional instrumentation (8, 10)

Additional musicians

- Péter Illényi – conductor (1, 8, 10, 13)
- James Larter – marimba (1, 6–7, 13)
- Aemon Beech – percussion (1)
- Anuanua Drummers – percussion (2, 6, 13)
- Daniel Ricciardo – backing vocals (2), percussion (11)
- Auckland Gospel Choir – backing vocals (2, 8, 11–13)
- Seumanu Simon Matāfai – vocal director (2, 8, 11–13)
- Ian Burdge – cello (5, 11)
- Nick Etwell – trumpet, flügel horn (5, 11, 13)
- David Williamson – trombone (5, 11, 13)
- Matt Gunner – french horn (5, 11, 13)
- Ilid Jones – Cor anglais, oboe (5, 13)
- Jonathan Griffiths – saxophone (5–6, 13), flute (5, 13), clarinet (13)
- Indiana Dunn – percussion, backing vocals (6)
- Simon Matāfai – piano (6)
- Kaumātua Tony Gibbs – Kōrero spoken word (6)
- Shane McLean – Taonga Pūiri instrumentalist (3, 6–7, 10, 13), Kōrero (8)
- Adam Duritz – backing vocals (7, 10)
- Peter Hutchings – modular synth (11)
- Blake Friend – percussion (11)
- Anna Pamin – percussion (11)
- Count – synth (13)
- Gretta Ray – backing vocals (13)

Technical

- Gang of Youths – producer, writing, engineer (all tracks)
- Shane McLean – writing (8)
- Peter Hutchings – producer (2, 11), engineer (2–3, 6, 8, 11–13)
- Peter Katis – producer (2), mixing (4–5, 9)
- Count – mixing (1–2, 4–13), mastering (all tracks)
- Craig Silvey – mixing (3)
- Richard Woodcraft – engineering (1, 5–7, 13)
- Gergő Láposi – orchestral engineering (1, 7–8, 10)
- Péter Barabás – orchestral engineering (1, 7–8, 10)
- Dani Bennett Spragg – mixing assistance (11)
- Emily Wheatcroft Snape – engineering assistance (2, 11)
- Jamie Sprosen – engineering assistance (2, 11)
- Luke O'Dea – engineering assistance (3)
- Tess Dunn – engineering assistance (6)

== Charts ==
=== Weekly charts ===
Weekly chart performance for Angel in Realtime
Chart (2022)	Peak position
Australian Albums (ARIA)	1
Hungarian Albums (MAHASZ)	12
New Zealand Albums (RMNZ)	37
Scottish Albums (OCC)	6
UK Albums (OCC)	10

=== Year-end charts ===
2022 year-end chart performance for Angel in Realtime
Chart (2022)	Position
Australian Albums (ARIA)	70

== Certifications ==
Certifications for Angel in Realtime
Region	Certification	Certified units/sales
Australia (ARIA)	Silver	20,000^{‡}
^{‡} Sales+streaming figures based on certification alone.
