= Magnolia (Gang of Youths song) =

2015 single by Gang of Youths

Single by Gang of Youths

from the album The Positions
- Released: 17 April 2015
- Genre: Alternative rock
- Length: 5:11
- Lyricist: David Le'aupepe
- Producer: Gang of Youths

Gang of Youths singles chronology
| "Radioface" (2015) | "Magnolia" (2015) | "Heroes" (2016) |

"Magnolia" is a song by Australian alternative rock band Gang of Youths. It was released on 17 April 2015 as the third single from their debut studio album, The Positions. The song recounts the experience of frontman David Le'aupepe on a "week-long bender that precluded sleep and eating" and his subsequent suicide attempt on 3 June 2014. The date, referenced within the lyrics, has since become known by fans as Magnolia Day.

In 2018, the song was certified platinum by the Australian Recording Industry Association (ARIA) for selling over 70,000 equivalent units. "Magnolia" polled at number six in Triple J's Hottest 100 of the 2010s and featured in the Hottest 100 of Australian Songs. It has been described as the band's breakthrough hit, having over 39 million streams on Spotify as of 2022.

== Lyricism ==
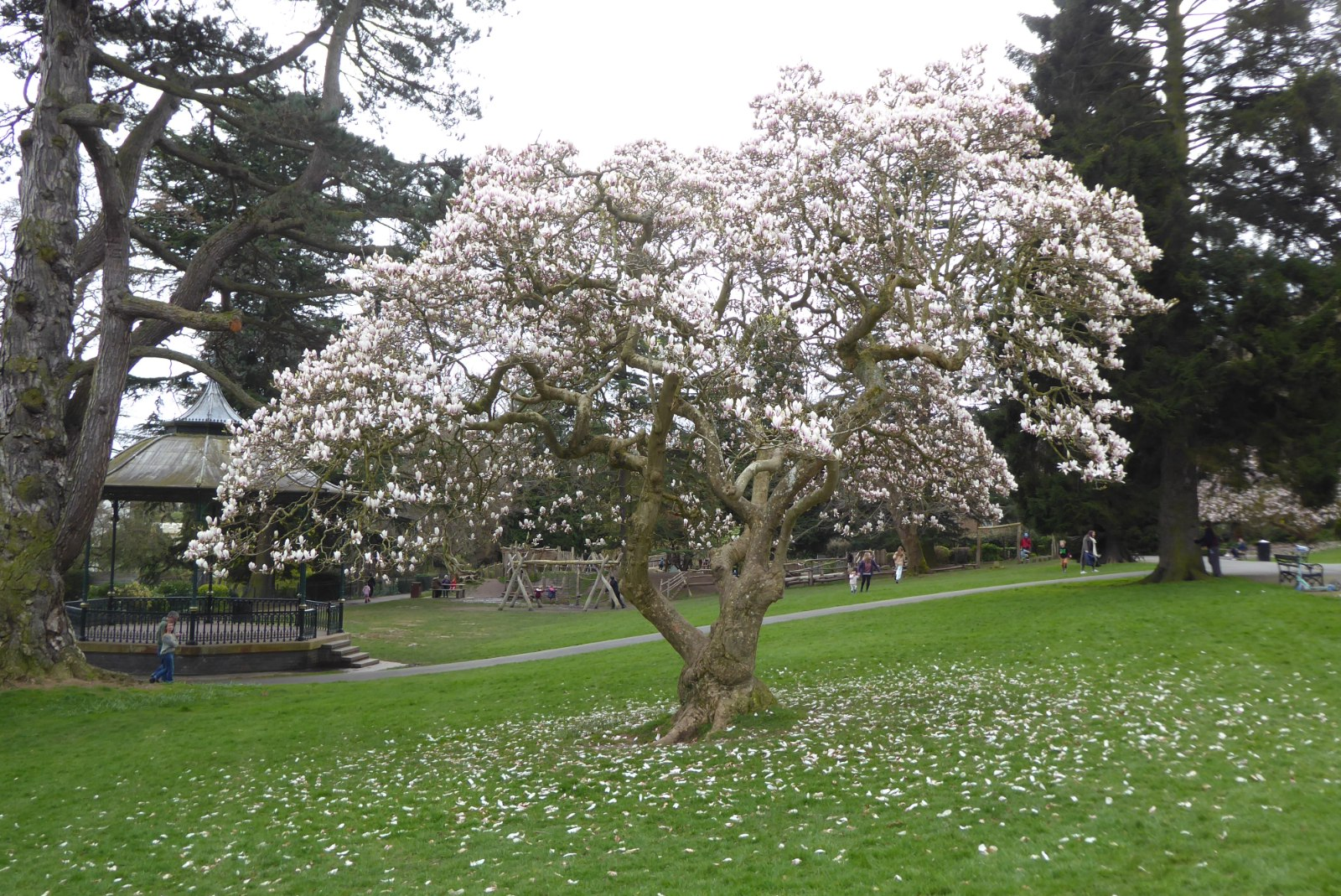
Le'aupepe sat under a magnolia tree after his friends intercepted his suicide attempt.

On 3 June 2014, Gang of Youths frontman David Le'aupepe, at the end of a week-long bender consisting of "plenty of drinking, smoking and vomiting up blood", was walking drunk with a bottle of Southern Comfort whiskey in his hand through the Sydney suburb of Strathfield. He later admitted he tried to commit suicide that night, but his friends called the police who intercepted him. They sat him by the magnolia tree outside his father's house, of which the song is named after.

"In a state of puerile drunken delirium, reeling from having my heart fucked beyond all recognition and knowing my marriage was about to fall apart, I tried to kill myself."

Afterwards, Le'aupepe was entered into rehabilitation and "began a process of healing and self-discovery". In 2018, on the fourth anniversary of the incident, he shared a lengthy post on social media thanking his friends for saving his life and further opening up about his mental health struggles.

== Music video ==
The "Magnolia" music video was directed by Le'aupepe and Josh Harris, and released on 28 January 2016. The frontman said he wanted to convey a "deep freeness, a sense of loss, a sadness" in the video.

== Reception and legacy ==
Jessica Dale for The Music wrote "Magnolia" is "anthemic, catchy and brings hordes of people together in unified song; a stark contrast to the song's birth following Le'aupepe's attempted suicide". She further writes the track "launched Gang of Youths into the Australian psyche in a big, big way". Writing for The AU Review, Genevieve Morris called the track a "timeless classic", writing "the passion and liveliness behind the song is addictive and unforgettable".

In 2015, "Magnolia" polled at number 21 in Triple J's Hottest 100 of 2015. In the 2020 countdown of the Hottest 100 of the 2010s, the track polled at number six. In 2025, it placed 42 in the Hottest 100 of Australian Songs in 2025.

The third of June, referenced in the lyrics as the day Le'aupepe was intercepted from committing suicide in 2014, is known as Magnolia Day to fans.

== Personnel ==
Credits adapted from The Positions liner notes.

- David Le'aupepe – writing, lead vocals, string arrangement, guitars, piano, keyboards, engineering
- Jung Kim – keyboards, engineering
- Joji Malani – guitars, keyboards, string arrangement, engineering
- Max Dunn – bass guitar
- Joel van Gastel – drums
- Nora Wever – engineering
- Peter Holz – additional engineering
- Karl Cashwell – mixing, additional engineering
- Gang of Youths – producer

== Certifications ==
Certifications for "Magnolia"
| Region | Certification | Certified units/sales |
|---|---|---|
| Australia (ARIA) | Platinum | 70,000^{‡} |
^{‡} Sales+streaming figures based on certification alone.
