= Mean Jeans =

American punk rock band

- Origin: Portland, Oregon
- Genres: Punk rock, garage punk, indie rock
- Years active: 2006–present
- Labels: Rehab, Dirtnap, Trouble in Mind, Fat Wreck Chords
- Members: Billy Jeans; Jeans Wilder; Junior Jeans
- Past members: Howie Doodat

Mean Jeans are a Portland, Oregon-based punk rock band formed in 2006 by guitarist Billy Jeans and drummer Jeans Wilder. They are known for their loud, humorous, fun-loving songs, and for their music's intentional resemblance to that of the Ramones.

== Discography ==
=== Studio albums ===
- Are You Serious? (Dirtnap, 2009)
- On Mars (Dirtnap, 2012)
- Tight New Dimension (Fat Wreck Chords, 2016)
- Jingles Collection (Fat Wreck Chords, 2018)
- Gigantic Sike (Fat Wreck Chords, 2019)
- Blasted (Fat Wreck Chords, 2024)

=== Singles ===
- Stoned 2 the Bone (Rehab single, 2008)
- Tears in My Beers/Cool 2 Drive (Trouble in Mind single, 2010)

=== EPs ===
- License to Chill (Dirtnap EP, 2009)
