= Triple J Like a Version Sessions =

2022 EP by Gang of Youths

Compilation album by Gang of Youths
- Released: 12 August 2022
- Recorded: 20 March 2015; 15 September 2017; 5 August 2022
- Studio: Triple J
- Genre: Alternative rock
- Length: 33:51
- Label: ABC Music
- Producer: Greg Wales

Gang of Youths chronology
| Immolation Tape (2022) | Triple J Like a Version Sessions (2022) | Compañero (2027) |

Triple J Like a Version Sessions is a compilation EP by Australian alternative rock band Gang of Youths, released on 12 August 2022. It features the songs performed by the band throughout their three appearances on radio station Triple J's live music segment, Like a Version, from 2015 to 2022.

In 2023, all three of Gang of Youths' covers were featured in the Hottest 100 of Like a Version, with "Blood" at number six, "Why Does It Always Rain on Me?" at number 39, and "All My Friends" at 75.

== Performances ==
=== 2015: "All My Friends" ===
On 20 March 2015, Gang of Youths made their Like a Version debut, performing "All My Friends" by American rock band LCD Soundsystem. They also played their 2014 original single "Benevolence Riots", featuring Montaigne providing backing vocals. The cover was listed among the 12 best Like a Version covers ever, according to a 2015 article by Tone Deaf. Further, X-Press Mag named it "one of the segment’s best covers of 2014."

=== 2017: "Blood" ===
On 15 September 2017, they returned to perform "Blood", a track by Townsville folk band the Middle East. Frontman David Le'aupepe claimed the song "had a huge and tremendous impact on our adolescence". They also played "The Deepest Sighs, the Frankest Shadows" from their 2017 album, Go Farther in Lightness.

Their performance of "Blood" was lauded by the public. It polled at number 41 in the Hottest 100 of 2017. On lifestyle magazine Man of Many's list ranking the best Like a Version covers of all time, Gang of Youths ranks at number 10 for "Blood", and at number four in the best covers from 2017. According to Triple J, "Blood" was the fourth most-viewed Like a Version of 2017.

=== 2022: "Why Does It Always Rain on Me?" ===
Their most recent appearance on the segment, on 5 August 2022, saw the band perform 1999 single "Why Does It Always Rain on Me?" by Scottish band Travis. Le'aupepe also solely performed "Brothers" from their 2022 album, Angel in Realtime. The cover polled at number 105 in the Hottest 100 of 2022.

In the 2023 Hottest 100 of Like a Version countdown, all three of Gang of Youths' covers were featured. "Blood" polled at number six, with "Why Does It Always Rain On Me?" at number 39 and "All My Friends" at number 75.

== Compilation ==
ABC Music published Triple J Like a Version Sessions on 12 August 2022, the first Like a Version compilation the label released. Previously, none of the band's performances had been available on streaming services.

== Track listing ==
Track listing for Triple J Like a Version Sessions
| No. | Title | Original artist | Writers | Air date | Duration |
|---|---|---|---|---|---|
| 1 | "Why Does It Always Rain on Me?" | Travis | Healy Francis | 5 August 2022 | 3:42 |
| 2 | "Brothers" | Gang of Youths | David Le'aupepe; Donnie Borzestowski; Jung Kim; Max Dunn; Tom Hobden | 5 August 2022 | 6:31 |
| 3 | "Blood" | The Middle East | Jordan Ireland; Rohin Jones | 15 September 2017 | 5:29 |
| 4 | "The Deepest Sighs, the Frankest Shadows" | Gang of Youths | Le'aupepe | 15 September 2017 | 6:22 |
| 5 | "All My Friends" | LCD Soundsystem | James Murphy | 20 March 2015 | 6:25 |
| 6 | "Benevolence Riots" | Gang of Youths | Le'aupepe | 20 March 2015 | 5:19 |

== Release history ==
Release formats for Gang of Youths' Like a Version appearances
| Release | Year | Format | Label | Ref. |
|---|---|---|---|---|
| "All My Friends" | 2015 | CD (Triple J Like a Version Vol. 11) | ABC Music | |
| "Blood" | 2018 | CD (Triple J Like a Version Vol. 14) | ABC Music | |
| Triple J Like a Version Sessions | 2022 | Digital download; streaming | ABC Music | |
