= Smoko (song) =

Single by The Chats

from the album Get This in Ya!!
- Released: 14 August 2017
- Recorded: 2017
- Genre: Punk rock
- Length: 3:00
- Songwriter: The Chats
- Producer: Fin Wegener

The Chats singles chronology
"Smoko" (2017)	"Do What I Want" (2018)

"Smoko" is a song by Australian punk rock band The Chats. It was initially released on their EP Get This in Ya!! on 31 July 2017, before being released as a single on 14 August.

The song gained international attention following the release of its viral music video on YouTube on 3 October 2017. The song was certified gold in Australia in May 2021.

== Background ==
Eamon Sandwith, bassist of the Chats, explained to Red Bull that the song originated in December 2016:

I was walking to the bakery from my dad’s house. The words of the chorus just got stuck in my head while I was walking, and when I got home I wrote the song. Josh [Price, guitarist] and Matt [Boggis, drums] helped me make it sound better.

The song was included as the opening track to their second EP, Get This in Ya!!, released on 31 July 2017. The music video for the song was released on 3 October 2017 on YouTube, and it immediately began garnering an unexpected amount of attention, ultimately culminating in more than 22 million views by February 2025.

== Music video ==
The music video for the song, shot by Matisse Langbein (who also did the artwork for Get This In Ya!!) at Peregian Beach, mostly adheres to the lyrics in the song, depicting Chats bassist Eamon Sandwith wearing a lifeguard shirt, approaching a tradesman on a construction site (played by Josh Price) eating a sausage roll while sitting on a milk crate (referred to in the song as a 'milk crate throne'). During the chorus, it cuts to the band playing on the same construction site. During the second verse, Eamon rises from his bed, drinks a can of beer and opens a laptop to see a piece of paper taped on the laptop screen saying "CENNO: ZERO BUCKS" (referencing the lyric "So it's Tuesday morning/And my Centrelink hasn't come through)". It then cuts to him on the phone calling Centrelink with drummer Matt Boggis playing a Centrelink employee, who leaves him hanging until he picks up the phone and yells the chorus of the song, leaving Eamon banging the doorway in anger, and then puts down the phone. It then cuts to Eamon on a beach with binoculars, seeing what appears to be a woman having trouble in the ocean, but then checks his (non-existent) watch and realizes it's 'smoko'. It then cuts to the band playing in a different area nearby the same ocean, where the video ends shortly afterwards.

== Reception ==
Triple J Unearthed described "Smoko" in their biography of the Chats as being "a perfectly put together punk song protesting the drudgery of dole queue angst, minimum wage life and work-place hierarchies." The song and its video became popular in late 2017. The song also drew attention from musicians such as Dave Grohl, Josh Homme, Alex Turner, and Iggy Pop.

== Personnel ==
- Eamon Sandwith – vocals
- Josh Price – guitar
- Tremayne McCarthy – bass, backing vocals
- Matt Boggis – drums

== Certifications ==
Certifications for "Smoko"
Region	Certification	Certified units/sales
Australia (ARIA)	Gold	35,000^{‡}
^{‡} Sales+streaming figures based on certification alone.
