= MTV Unplugged (The Rubens album) =

Live album by The Rubens
- Released: 10 May 2019
- Recorded: 28 February 2019
- Studio: Esplanade Hotel, Melbourne
- Length: 60:53
- Label: Ivy League

The Rubens chronology
Lo La Ru (2018)	MTV Unplugged (2019)	0202 (2021)

MTV Unplugged is the first live album by Australian alternative rock group, The Rubens. The album was released on 10 May 2019.

== Background ==
On 30 January 2019, the MTV Unplugged Melbourne concert series announced The Rubens as the first act of 2019. The performance took place on Thursday 28 February at the Esplanade Hotel in St Kilda before a live audience and screened on 14 March 2019. On 15 March 2019, the album was announced with a date set in May.

== Reception ==
MTV said "The album feels like a timeline of the band's progressions as both artists and songwriters, as they seamlessly perform a tightrope walk between the raw and the refined." adding "The band have completely transported the listener to a magical evening that happened months ago, yet it still feels fresh, exciting and like they're right there in front of you."

== Track listing ==
No.	Title	Writer(s)	Length
1.	"Go On"		3:40
2.	"My Gun"	David Kahne; The Rubens	3:21
3.	"Casper"		3:16
4.	"Elvis"		3:55
5.	"The Best We Got"		5:02
6.	"Mary"		3:26
7.	"Freakout"		5:00
8.	"Nothing Breaks Like a Heart" (featuring Lauren Azar)	Mark Ronson; Miley Cyrus; Ilsey Juber; Clement Picard; Maxime Picard; Conor Szymanski; Thomas Brenneck	6:14
9.	"Teeth"		5:27
10.	"Lay It Down"		4:13
11.	"Never Ever" (featuring Lauren Azar)		4:01
12.	"Hoops"		4:22
13.	"Million Man"		4:26
14.	"God Forgot"		4:30

== Release history ==
Region	Date	Format	Edition(s)	Label	Catalogue
Australia	10 May 2019	digital download; streaming	Standard	Ivy League	
Australia	10 May 2019	CD+DVD	Deluxe	Ivy League	IVY478
