= Blank Realm =

Australian band

Blank Realm is a musical group from Brisbane, Queensland, Australia active since 2005. The group is composed of sibling members Daniel, Luke and Sarah Spencer and guitarist Luke Walsh. They were described by the Guardian newspaper as having "a sound drawn from krautrock, New York’s no wave, New Zealand’s entire Flying Nun roster, and those closer to home, like the Go-Betweens." The group's music employs pop /rock song structures, but uses elements of improvisation, particularly during live performances

Their 2014 album Grassed Inn was shortlisted for the Australian Music Prize (AMP).

In 2015 the band's album Illegals in Heaven won best album at the Queensland Music Awards. The song "Palace of Love" was the most played track on Double J digital radio that year.

== Discography ==
Title	Details
Heatless Ark	Released: 2009; Label: Not Not Fun Records; Format: CD, digital download
Deja What?	Released: November 2010; Label: Alberts Basement (AB20), Bedroom Suck Records (BSR017); Format: CD, LP digital download
Go Easy	Released: November 2012; Label: Fire Records, Siltbreeze, Bedroom Suck Records (BSR034); Format: CD, LP digital download
Grassed Inn	Released: January 2014; Label: Fire Records, Bedroom Suck Records (BSR051): Format: CD, LP digital download
Illegals in Heaven	Released: 4 September 2015; Label: Fire Records, Bedroom Suck Records (BSR063); Format: CD, LP digital download, streaming
Last Seen	Released: 2018; Label: Hobbies Galore (HG010 ); Format: Limited to 300 LP copies

== Extended plays ==
Title	Details
Free Time	Released: 2007; Label: Music Your Mind Will Love You (mymwly0082); Format: CD, digital download

== Awards and nominations ==
=== Australian Music Prize ===
The Australian Music Prize (the AMP) is an annual award of $30,000 given to an Australian band or solo artist in recognition of the merit of an album released during the year of award. The commenced in 2005.

Year	Nominee / work	Award	Result
2014	Grassed Inn	Australian Music Prize	Nominated

=== J Award ===
The J Awards are an annual series of Australian music awards that were established by the Australian Broadcasting Corporation's youth-focused radio station Triple J. They commenced in 2005.

Year	Nominee / work	Award	Result
J Awards of 2014	themselves	Double J Artist of the Year	Nominated
J Awards of 2015	themselves	Double J Artist of the Year	Nominated

=== Queensland Music Awards ===
The Queensland Music Awards (previously known as Q Song Awards) are annual awards celebrating Queensland, Australia's brightest emerging artists and established legends. They commenced in 2006.

Year	Nominee / work	Award	Result (wins only)
2016	Illegals in Heaven	Album of the Year	Won
