= Hold Me Back =

Hold Me Back may refer to:

- "Hold Me Back" (Rick Ross song), a hip-hop song by American rapper Rick Ross, from God Forgives, I Don't
- "Hold Me Back", a 2000 song by AC/DC, from the album Stiff Upper Lip
- "Hold Me Back", a 2019 song by Hayden James featuring Boy Matthews, from the album Between Us
- "Hold Me Back", a 2016 song by The Rubens from the album Hoops
