= Alpine (band) =

Australian band

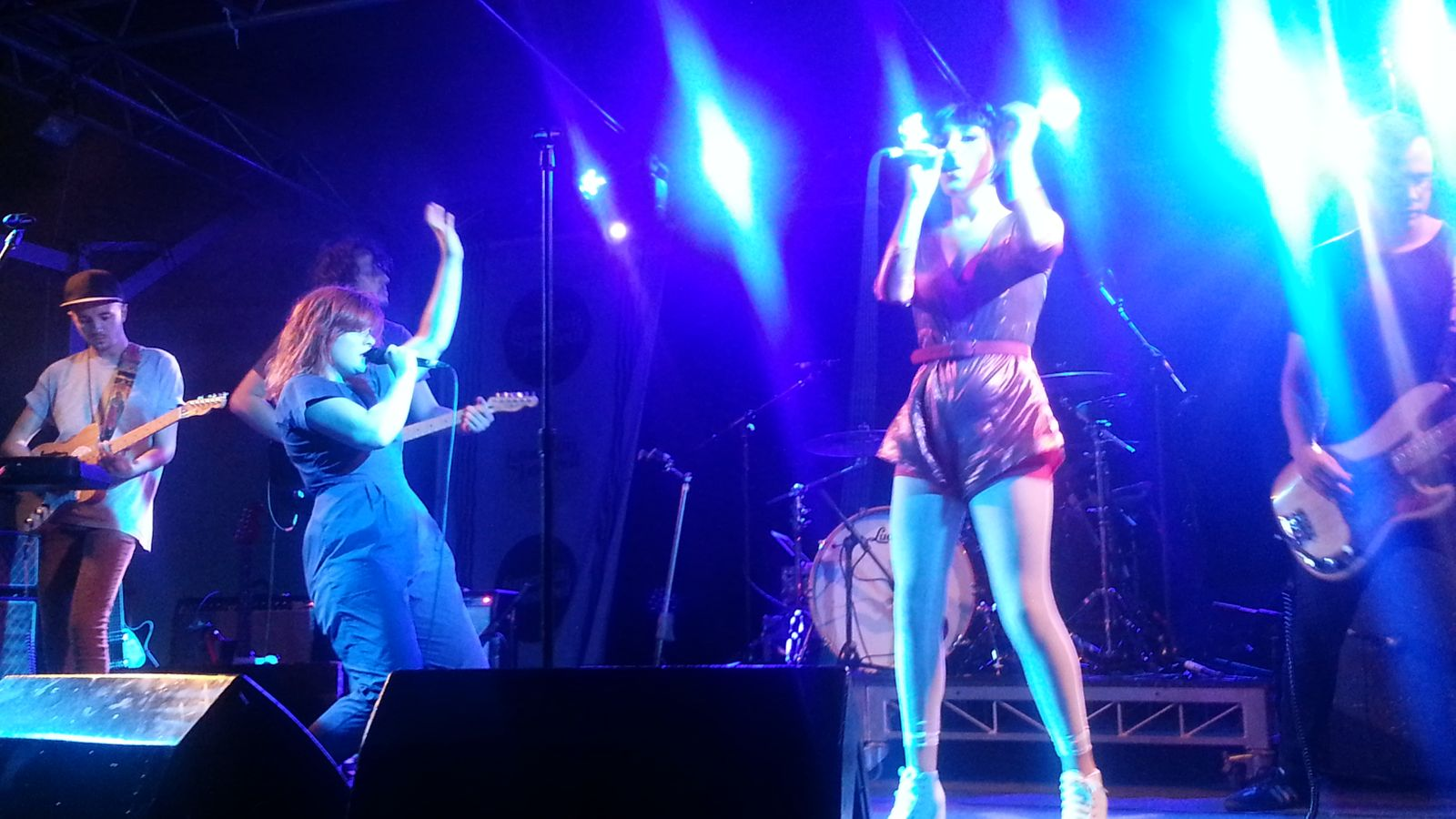
- Alpine performing at St Jerome's Laneway Festival in Brisbane, 1 February 2013

Background information
- Origin: Melbourne, Victoria, Australia
- Genres: Indie pop, alternative dance
- Years active: 2009–2019 (hiatus 2016–2019)
- Labels: Ivy League Records, Votiv Records
- Past members: Phoebe Baker; Christian O'Brien; Ryan Lamb; Tim Royall; Phil Tucker; Lou James
- Website: http://www.alpineband.com

Alpine were an Australian indie pop band from Melbourne, Victoria, formed in 2009.

== History ==
In August 2010, Ivy League Records announced they had signed Alpine. They released their debut EP, Zurich, in November 2010.

In November 2011, the group released the single "Hands" "Gasoline", was released in July 2012 and was described by Pitchfork as an "unforgettably light and charismatic gem". It reached No. 31 in the Triple J Hottest 100, 2012.

Their debut studio album, A Is for Alpine, was released in Australia in August 2012 and debuted at No. 11 on the ARIA chart. At the ARIA Music Awards of 2012, they were nominated for Breakthrough Artist and Best Video

In 2013, they toured the United States in March 2013, playing shows in Los Angeles and New York City, and in September 2013, made their US television debut on Jimmy Kimmel Live!.

In June 2015, the band released their second album, Yuck reaching No. 16 on the Australian charts. Its lead single, "Foolish", came in at number 57 in Triple J Hottest 100, 2015.

After an extended hiatus, Alpine returned in 2019 with a new single, "Dumb" on 1 May 2019. A week prior, the band had announced that founding member and co-lead vocalist Lou James would be departing from the band.

In December 2020, lead guitarist Christian O'Brien was charged with sexual assault regarding an incident on 2 August 2019. When releasing a statement of concern, the band revealed it had split up the year prior.

== Band members ==
- Phoebe Baker – vocals, keyboards (2009–2019), occasional guitar (2009–2012)
- Christian O'Brien – guitar (2009–2019), keyboards (2019)
- Ryan Lamb – bass (2009–2019), keyboards (2019)
- Tim Royall – keyboards, guitar, percussion (2009–2019)
- Phil Tucker – drums, percussion (2009–2019)
- Lou James – vocals, percussion (2009–2019)

== Discography ==
=== Studio albums ===
Title	Details	Peak chart positions
Title	Details	AUS
A Is for Alpine	Released: 10 August 2012; Label: Ivy League Records (IVY166); Format: CD, digital download	11
Yuck	Released: 12 June 2015; Label: Ivy League Records (IVY260); Format: CD, LP, streaming digital download	16

=== Extended plays ===
Title	Details	Peak chart positions
Title	Details	AUS physical
Zürich	Released: November 2010; Label: Ivy League (IVY100); Format: CD, digital download	9

=== Singles ===
Year	Title	Certification	Album
2010	"Heart Love"		Zürich
2010	"Villages"		Zürich
2011	"Hands"		A Is for Alpine
2012	"Gasoline"	ARIA: Platinum	A Is for Alpine
2012	"Seeing Red"		A Is for Alpine
2015	"Foolish"	ARIA: Gold	Yuck
2015	"Damn Baby"		Yuck
2015	"Shot Fox"		Yuck
2019	"Dumb"		

== Awards and nominations ==
=== AIR Awards ===
The Australian Independent Record Awards (commonly known informally as AIR Awards) is an annual awards night to recognise, promote and celebrate the success of Australia's Independent Music sector.

Year	Nominee / work	Award	Result
2012	"Gasoline"	Best Independent Single/EP	Nominated

=== APRA Awards ===
The APRA Awards are presented annually from 1982 by the Australasian Performing Right Association (APRA), "honouring composers and songwriters".

Year	Nominee / work	Award	Result
2013	Alpine	Breakthrough Songwriter(s) of the Year	Nominated

=== ARIA Music Awards ===
The ARIA Music Awards is an annual awards ceremony that recognises excellence, innovation, and achievement across all genres of the music of Australia.

Year	Nominee / work	Award	Result
2012	A Is for Alpine	Breakthrough Artist - Release	Nominated
2012	"Hands" (directed by Luci Schroder)	Best Video	Nominated
2013	"Seeing Red"	Engineer of the Year	Nominated

=== EG Awards ===
The EG Awards are an annual awards night celebrating Victorian music. They commenced in 2006.

Year	Nominee / work	Award	Result
2012	A Is for Alpine	Best Album	Won
2012	"Villages"	Best Song	Nominated
2012	themselves	Best Band	Nominated

=== J Awards ===
The J Awards are an annual series of Australian music awards that were established by the Australian Broadcasting Corporation's youth-focused radio station Triple J. They commenced in 2005.

Year	Nominee / work	Award	Result
2012	A Is for Alpine	Australian Album of the Year	Nominated
2012	"Hands" (directed by Luci Schroder)	Australian Video of the Year	Nominated
2015	Yuck	Australian Album of the Year	Nominated
