= Heavy Weather =

Heavy Weather may refer to:

- Heavy Weather (Wodehouse novel), a novel by P. G. Wodehouse
- Heavy Weather (TV film), a 1995 adaptation of Wodehouse's novel
- Heavy Weather (Sterling novel), a 1994 science fiction novel by Bruce Sterling
- Heavy Weather (album), a 1977 album by Weather Report
- "Heavy Weather" (song), a 2020 song by The Rubens
- "Heavy Weather", a song by Diana Ross from The Force Behind the Power
- "Heavy Weather", a song by Jarvis from Jarvis (album)
