= Lo La Ru =

Studio album by The Rubens
- Released: 29 June 2018
- Length: 43:24
- Label: Ivy League

The Rubens chronology
Hoops (2015)	Lo La Ru (2018)	MTV Unplugged (2019)

Singles from Lo La Ru
- 1. "Million Man" Released: 27 October 2017; 2. "Never Ever" Released: 13 April 2018; 3. "God Forgot" Released: 4 October 2018

Lo La Ru (stylised in all caps) is the third studio album by Australian alternative rock group, The Rubens. The album was released on 29 June 2018.

Ruben Elliott Margin told Triple J Lo La Ru is the name of the world that The Rubens built to make this album. "We came up with this idea of creating a fake nation behind this album. Because we'd created our own little world; brought these producers over from New York, had a studio in our hometown, [do] whatever we'd like to do and have fun doing it." They even gave the fictional nation a flag, which became the album's artwork.

In August 2018, the group announced a 12-date national "Lo La Ru" tour, which expanded to a 16-date tour in September. The tour commenced in Brunswick Heads, New South Wales on 2 November.

== Reception ==
Madelyn Tait from The Music gave the album 3½ out of 5 saying "Lo La Ru is full of fun, soul-injected rock tracks." She added: "The Rubens expand on and bring the hip hop and R&B elements they touched on in previous releases to the forefront."

Josh Leeson from The Herald gave the album 2½ out of 5 and thought The Rubens "attempted to replicate the appeal of "Hoops" by turning up their R&B and pop influences" but added "at times the album does wallow in lounge music mediocrity." Lesson said the album highlight is "God Forgot".

Tim Byron from The Sydney Morning Herald gave the album 3 out of 5, saying "Lo La Ru's soul-inflected indie rock is pleasantly melodic, often with a good sense of groove, and tastefully recorded. It also feels a little timid, however, as though this is a band trying to please everyone, rather than a band making a stand with fire and authority. All of which means that in six months we'll probably be hearing these songs on ads for cars and health insurance."

== Track listing ==
No.	Title	Writer(s)	Length
1.	"Million Man"	The Rubens	3:12
2.	"Go On"	The Rubens	2:44
3.	"I Know"	The Rubens	3:52
4.	"Never Ever" (featuring Sarah)	The Rubens / Sarah Aarons	3:20
5.	"Freakout"	The Rubens	3:23
6.	"God Forgot"	The Rubens	3:32
7.	"Woman Oh Woman"	The Rubens	3:44
8.	"Casper"	The Rubens	3:01
9.	"SOSO"	The Rubens	2:33
10.	"Mary"	The Rubens	3:13
11.	"Teeth"	The Rubens	3:28
12.	"All My Dollars"	The Rubens	7:27

- Note: "All My Dollars" contains hidden track "Young Me", beginning at 4:14

== Personnel ==
The Rubens

- Sam Margin – lead vocals (all tracks), guitar
- Elliott Margin – keyboards, backing vocals (all tracks), lead vocals (track 1)
- Izaac Margin – lead guitar
- William Zeglis – bass guitar, engineering
- Scott Baldwin – drums

Additional musicians

- Sarah Aarons – guest vocals (track 4)

== Charts ==
Chart (2018)	Peak position
Australian Albums (ARIA)	3

== Release history ==
Region	Date	Format	Edition(s)	Label	Catalogue
Australia	29 June 2018	CD; digital download; streaming	Standard	Ivy League	IVY421
Australia	20 July 2018	Limited edition LP	Limited	Ivy League	IVY413
