= I've Been Trying =

I've Been Trying may refer to:

- "I've Been Trying", a song by the Impressions on the 1964 album Keep On Pushing
- "I've Been Trying", a song by DJ Shadow on the 2011 album The Less You Know, the Better
- "I've Been Trying", a song by Tired Lion on the 2017 album Dumb Days
