= Group Therapy =

Group Therapy may refer to:

- Group psychotherapy, a form of psychotherapy
- Group Therapy (Above & Beyond album) (2011)
- Group Therapy (Alter Natives album) (1988)
- Group Therapy (Concrete Blonde album) (2002)
- Group Therapy (Dope album) (2003)
- New York Jazz Sextet: Group Therapy (1966)
- Group Therapy (The Rubens album)
- Group Therapy (Sivion album)
- Grouptherapy, an American music collective
