= Lay It Down =

Lay It Down may refer to:

- Lay It Down (Cowboy Junkies album), 1996
- Lay It Down (Al Green album), 2008
- Lay It Down (Jennifer Knapp album), 2000
- "Lay It Down" (Ratt song), 1985
- "Lay It Down", a 2002 song by Aerosmith, from the album O, Yeah! Ultimate Aerosmith Hits
- "Lay It Down", a 1981 song by Journey, from the album Escape
- "Lay It Down", a 2005 song by Royce da 5'9" from the album Independent's Day
- "Lay It Down" (Magnapop song), a 1994 song from the album Hot Boxing
- "Lay It Down" (Lloyd song), a 2010 song from the album King of Hearts
- "Lay It Down", a 2010 song by Jars of Clay from the album The Shelter
- "Lay It Down" (The Rubens song), a 2011 song by the Rubens.
- Lay It Down (film), a 2001 Christian action film directed by Michael Cargile
