= Hoops (album) =

Album by The Rubens

Studio album by The Rubens
- Released: 7 August 2015
- Genres: Alternative; pop; rock
- Length: 35:04
- Label: Ivy League Records
- Producers: David Kahne, Eric J Dubowsky

The Rubens chronology
The Rubens (2012)	Hoops (2015)	Lo La Ru (2018)

Singles from Hoops
- 1. "Hallelujah" Released: 19 May 2015; 2. "Hoops" Released: 24 July 2015; 3. "Hold Me Back" Released: 19 February 2016

Hoops is the second studio album by Australian alternative rock group, The Rubens, which was released on 7 August 2015 and reached number 2 on the ARIA Albums Chart. It was produced by David Kahne and mixed by Michael Brauer, except for the title track, "Hoops", which was produced and mixed by Eric J.

At the J Awards of 2015, the album was nominated for Australian Album of the Year.

A deluxe edition was released in November 2016, including the Acoustic Hoops EP.

The album was released in 2025 to celebrate the album's 10th anniversary.

== Reception ==
Jessica Thomas of Renowned for Sound gave the album 4.5 out of 5, saying; "A major theme for this record is negative feelings that are inspired by draining relationships and these songs give Hoops an edge, they're dealing with the nitty gritty in such an appealing way. Tracks like "Hoops", "Switchblade", "Bitter End", "Cut Me Loose", "Battles" and "Hold Me Back" all deal with some quite serious subjects, with all of them stemming back to being hurt by someone (or something) that you once loved." She added "Overall The Rubens Hoops is a finely crafted vessel that takes us on a journey through the often-dark tunnel of life and keeps you dancing the whole way until you reach the light."

Cara Oliveri of The Music gave the album 4 out of 5, saying; "After two years on the road, the [band] have bottled their boozy late nights and one-night stand tales into a soul-sodden rock album. Crammed with gritty guitars, foot-stomping rhythms and Sam Margin's signature bluesy vocals that ooze country town swag, The Rubens have pulled off an epic round two of rock'n'roll tunes." she concluded his review with "Full of rock belters and woozy nuggets, The Rubens' second album won't disappoint."

Jacob Robinson of Daily Review gave the album 2.5 out of 5, saying; "Album opener and lead single "Hallelujah" has a stomping beat and a shout-along chorus that creates some dynamics. "Cut Me Loose" manages to mesh soulful organ with some crunchy guitars in a pleasing manner. The best of the bunch is the title track, which at attempts to challenge the group's song writing abilities and shows they can extend themselves. Other than that, it's a pretty same-same host of dull, mid-tempo rockers. They could probably get away with it if any of the songs had a really cracking hook to stick in your brain like "My Gun" or "Lay it Down" did on their first album — but it does not."

== Track listing ==
All tracks written by Scott Baldwin, Elliott Margin, Izaac Margin, Sam Margin and William Zeglis.

No.	Title	Length
1.	"Hallelujah"	2:56
2.	"The Night Is on My Side"	3:16
3.	"Hoops"	2:38
4.	"Switchblade"	3:49
5.	"Bitter End"	3:04
6.	"Cut Me Loose"	3:00
7.	"Things About to Change"	2:47
8.	"Battles"	3:39
9.	"Hold Me Back"	2:54
10.	"The Original"	3:49
11.	"The Fool"	3:13

Acoustic Hoops EP
No.	Title	Length
1.	"Hoops" (acoustic)
2.	"My Gun" (acoustic)
3.	"Trickle Down Effect" (acoustic)
4.	"Lay It Down" (acoustic)
5.	"Same Drugs"

== Charts ==
Hoops debuted and peaked at number 2 in Australia behind Dr. Dre's Compton. It sold 4,759 copies its first week.

Chart (2015)	Peak position
Australian Albums (ARIA)	2

=== Year-end charts ===
Chart (2015)	Position
Australian Albums (ARIA)	70
Australian Artist Albums (ARIA)	27

== Release history ==
Region	Date	Format	Edition(s)	Label	Catalogue
Australia	7 August 2015	CD; digital download	Standard	Ivy League Records	IVY259
United Kingdom	19 February 2016	digital download	Standard	Warner Bros.	
United States	4 March 2016	digital download	Standard	Warner Bros.	
Australia	4 November 2016	2xCD; digital download	Deluxe	Ivy League Records	IVY342
Australia	August 2025	LP	10th Anniversary	Ivy League Records	
