= J Awards of 2015 =

Annual Australian music awards

- Date: 19 November 2015
- Venue: Australia
- Website: abc.net.au/triplej

The J Award of 2015 is the eleventh annual J Awards, established by the Australian Broadcasting Corporation's youth-focused radio station Triple J. The announcement comes at the culmination of Ausmusic Month (November). For the second year, four awards were presented; Australian Album of the Year, Double J Artist of the Year, Australian Music Video of the Year and Unearthed Artist of the Year.

The eligible period took place between November 2014 and October 2015. The winners were announced live on air on Triple J on Tuesday 19 November 2015.

== Awards ==
=== Australian Album of the Year ===
| Artist | Album Title | Result |
|---|---|---|
| Courtney Barnett | Sometimes I Sit and Think, and Sometimes I Just Sit | Won |
| Alison Wonderland | Run | Nominated |
| Alpine | Yuck | Nominated |
| Gang of Youths | The Positions | Nominated |
| Hermitude | Dark Night Sweet Light | Nominated |
| Jarryd James | Thirty One | Nominated |
| Parkway Drive | Ire | Nominated |
| Seth Sentry | Strange New Past | Nominated |
| Tame Impala | Currents | Nominated |
| The Rubens | Hoops | Nominated |

=== Double J Artist of the Year ===
| Artist | Result |
|---|---|
| Tim Rogers | Won |
| Blank Realm | Nominated |
| Emma Donovan & the PutBacks | Nominated |
| Hiatus Kaiyote | Nominated |
| Paul Kelly | Nominated |

=== Australian Video of the Year ===
| Director | Artist and Song | Result |
|---|---|---|
| Natalie Erika James | Life Is Better Blonde - "Mine" | Won |
| Darcy Prendergast and Josh Thomas | Boy and Bear - "Walk The Wire" | Nominated |
| Heath Kerr and Josh Davis | Briggs - "The Children Came Back" | Nominated |
| Charlie Ford | Courtney Barnett - "Pedestrian at Best" | Nominated |
| Clemens Habicht | Flume (feat. Andrew Wyatt) - "Some Minds" | Nominated |

=== Unearthed Artist of the Year ===
| Artist | Result |
|---|---|
| Tired Lion | Won |
| Boo Seeka | Nominated |
| Feki | Nominated |
| Gordi | Nominated |
| Vallis Alps | Nominated |
