= APRA Music Awards of 2019 =

Annual Australian music awards

- Date: 30 April 2019
- Location: Melbourne Town Hall, Melbourne
- Hosted by: Brian Nankervis
- Website: apraamcos.com.au/awards/

The APRA Music Awards of 2019 are the 37th annual awards given in the series of awards together known as APRA Awards, given in 2019. The awards are given in a series of categories in three divisions and in separate ceremonies throughout the year: the APRA Music Awards, Art Music Awards and Screen Music Awards. They are given by the Australasian Performing Right Association and the Australasian Mechanical Copyright Owners Society, known jointly as APRA AMCOS.

The Music Awards acknowledge outstanding achievements in contemporary songwriting, composing and publishing. The Music Awards ceremony was held on 30 April 2019 at the Melbourne Town Hall with Brian Nankervis as host; Sarah Aarons won four categories.

The Art Music Awards are provided in conjunction with the Australian Music Centre, and in 2019 the ceremony was held on 19 August at the Great Hall, University of Sydney. They were presented to "recognise achievement in the composition, performance, education and presentation of Australian art music. Art music covers activity across contemporary classical music, contemporary jazz and improvised music, experimental music and sound art."

The Screen Music Awards are run in conjunction with the Australian Guild of Screen Composers (AGSC), to "acknowledge excellence and innovation in the field of screen composition." Winners were announced on 20 November at a ceremony hosted by children's entertainer, Justine Clarke, at the Forum Melbourne.

== Presenters ==
The APRA Music Awards ceremony was hosted by Brian Nankervis. Guest presenters were Tina Arena, Briggs, Tania Doko, Tim Rogers, Dallas Frasca, Louis Schoorl, Megan Washington, François Tétaz, M-Phazes and G Flip.

== Performances ==
Performers on the night:

- The Rubens and Sarah Aarons - "Never Ever"
- Dean Lewis - "Stay Awake"
- Middle Kids and J.P. Shilo - "With the One I Love"
- J.P. Shilo, Fanny Lumsden and Henry Wagons - "Slow Mover"
- Radical Son and Samuel Pankhurst - "Native Tongue".
- Electric Fields - "I Said Hi"
- Max Sharam - "Society"

== APRA Music Awards ==
=== Blues & Roots Work of the Year ===
Title and/or artist	Writer(s)	Publisher(s)	Result
"Chateau" – Angus & Julia Stone	Angus Stone, Julia Stone	Sony/ ATV Music Publishing	Won
"Mystik" – Tash Sultana	Tash Sultana	Kobalt Music Publishing o.b.o. Tash Sultana	Nominated
"Second Hand Car" – Kim Churchill	Kim Churchill / Nicholas Hodgson	Sony/ATV Music Publishing / Kobalt Music Publishing	Nominated
"Tell It Like It Is" – Jack Ladder & The Dreamlanders	Jack Ladder	Sony/ATV Music Publishing	Nominated
"White Flag" – Jack Ladder & The Dreamlanders	Jack Ladder	Sony/ATV Music Publishing	Nominated

=== Breakthrough Songwriter of the Year ===
Writer(s)	Publisher(s)	Result
Danzal Baker p.k.a. Baker Boy	Kobalt Music Publishing o.b.o. Specific Music	Nominated
Dean Lewis	Kobalt Music Publishing o.b.o. Specific Music	Won
Georgia Flipo p.k.a. G Flip	Kobalt Music Publishing o.b.o. Future Classic	Nominated
Holly Rankin p.k.a. Jack River	Mushroom Music	Nominated
Tash Sultana	Kobalt Music Publishing o.b.o. Tash Sultana	Nominated

=== Country Work of the Year ===
List of Country Work of the Year nominees
Title and/or artist	Writer(s)	Publisher(s)	Result
"Ain't Seen It Yet" – The Wolfe Brothers	Brodie Rainbird, Nicholas Wolfe, Thomas Wolfe, Erik Anderson	Perfect Pitch Publishing / Peermusic	Nominated
"Day Drunk" – Morgan Evans	Morgan Evans, Chris DeStefano, Lindy Robbins	Warner/Chappell Music / Sony/ATV Music Publishing / Kobalt Music Publishing	Won
"I Do" – Morgan Evans	Morgan Evans, Chris DeStefano, Ashley Gorley	Warner/Chappell Music / Sony/ATV Music Publishing / Kobalt Music Publishing	Nominated
"In the Morning" – Tori Forsyth	Tori Forsyth	Universal Music Publishing o.b.o. Peppermintblue Publishing	Nominated
"The Campfire Song" – Kasey Chambers & the Fireside Disciples featuring Alan Pigram	Kasey Chambers, Bill Chambers, Alan Pigram	Mushroom Music / Kobalt Music Publishing o.b.o. Checked Label Services	Nominated

=== Dance Work of the Year ===
Title and/or artist	Writer(s)	Publisher(s)	Result
"Flames" – David Guetta, Sia	Sia Furler, Christopher Braide, David Guetta, Giorgio Tuinfort, Marcus Van Wattum	Sony/ATV Music Publishing / BMG Rights Management / Origin Music Publishing / KobaltMusic Publishing	Nominated
"Go Bang" – Pnau	Nick Littlemore, Sam Littlemore, Peter Mayes, Luke Steele	Universal Music Publishing, 120 Publishing, Universal Music Publishing Sony/ATV Music Publishing	Nominated
"Let You Down" – Peking Duk featuring Icona Pop	Adam Hyde, Reuben Styles, Styalz (a.k.a. Kaelyn Behr), Samuel Manville, Robert Taylor	BMG Rights Management / Sony/ATV Music Publishing / Native Tongue Music Publishing / Warner/Chappell Music	Nominated
"Tell Me You Love Me" – Galantis & Throttle	Sarah Aarons, Christian Karlsson (p.k.a. Bloodshy), Jimmy Koitzsch (p.k.a. Svidden), Robert Bergin, Linus Eklöw (p.k.a. Style of Eye), Edward Jenkins, Henrik Jonback	Sony/ATV Music Publishing Allegro / Native Tongue Music Publishing / Cobalt Music Publishing / Warner/Chappell Music	Nominated
"The Middle" – Zedd, Maren Morris & Grey	Sarah Aarons, Jordan Johnson, Stefan Johnson, Marcus Lomax, Kyle Trewartha, Michael Trewartha, Anton Zaslavski (p.k.a. Zedd)	Sony/ATV Music Publishing Allegro / BMG Rights Management / Kobalt Music Publishing / Universal/MCA Music Publishing	Won

=== International Work of the Year ===
Title and/or artist	Writer(s)	Publisher(s)	Result
"Havana" – Camila Cabello	Louis Bell, Camila Cabello, Frank Dukes, Kaan Gunesberk, Brittany Hazzard, Brian Lee, Ali Temposi, Yung Thug, Andrew Watt, Pharrell Williams	Sony/ATV Music Publishing/ Native Tongue Music Publishing / Warner/Chappell Music /Mushroom Music / Kobalt Music Publishing	Nominated
"Meant to Be" – Bebe Rexha & Florida Georgia Line	David Garcia, Tyler Hubbard, Joshua Miller, Bleta "Bebe" Rexha	Shout Music Publishing / Native Tongue Music Publishing / Warner/Chappell Music / BMG Rights Management	Nominated
"Perfect" – Ed Sheeran	Ed Sheeran	Sony/ATV Music Publishing	Won
"Rockstar" – Post Malone featuring 21 Savage	Shéyaa Abraham-Joseph (p.k.a. 21 Savage), Olufunmibi Awoshiley, Louis Bell, Post Malone, Carl Rosen, Jo Virginie	BMG Rights Management / Sony/ATV Music Publishing /Universal/MCA Music Publishing / Mushroom Music	Nominated
"What About Us" – P!nk	Alecia Moore (p.k.a. P!nk), John McDaid, Steve McCutcheon	Sony/ATV Music Publishing/ Kobalt Music Publishing/ Universal Music Publishing	Nominated

=== Licensee of the Year Award ===
Venue	Location	Result
Clancy's Fish Pub	Western Australia	Won

=== Most Played Australian Work ===
Title and/or artist	Writer(s)	Publisher(s)	Result
"Coming Home" – Sheppard	Jason Bovino, Matthew Radosevich (p.k.a. Matt Rad), Amy Sheppard, George Sheppard, Christopher Wallace	Mushroom Music o.b.o. Empire of Song / Native Tongue Music Publishing	Nominated
"Go Bang" – Pnau	Nick Littlemore, Sam Littlemore, Peter Mayes, Luke Steele	Universal Music Publishing / 120 Publishing / Sony/ATV Music Publishing	Nominated
"I Said Hi" – Amy Shark	Amy Billings (p.k.a. Amy Shark)	Mushroom Music obo UNIFIED Music Publishing	Nominated
"The Middle" – Zedd, Maren Morris & Grey	Sarah Aarons, Jordan Johnson, Stefan Johnson, Marcus Lomax, Kyle Trewartha, Michael Trewartha, Anton Zaslavski (p.k.a. Zedd)	Sony/ATV Music Publishing Allegro / BMG Rights Management / Kobalt Music Publishing / Universal/MCA Music Publishing	Won
"We're Going Home" - Vance Joy	James Keogh (p.k.a. Vance Joy), Daniel Wilson	Mushroom Music obo UNIFIED Music Publishing / BMG Rights Management	Nominated

=== Most Played Australian Work Overseas ===
Title and/or artist	Writer(s)	Publisher(s)	Result
"Cheap Thills" by Sia	Sia Furler, Greg Kurstin	Sony/ATV Music Publishing	Won

=== Overseas Recognition Award ===
Writer(s)	Publisher(s)	Result
Lindsay Rimes	Sony/ATV Music Publishing	Won

=== Pop Work of the Year ===
Title and/or artist	Writer(s)	Publisher(s)	Result
"Be Alright" – Dean Lewis	Dean Lewis, Jon Hume	Kobalt Music Publishing o.b.o. Specific Music / Sony/ATV Music Publishing	Nominated
"Coming Home" – Sheppard	Jason Bovino, Amy Sheppard, George Sheppard, Matthew Radosevich, Christopher Wallace	Mushroom Music o.b.o. Empire of Song / Native Tongue Music Publishing	Nominated
"Healing Hands" – Conrad Sewell	Stuart Crichton, Conrad Sewell, Stephen Wrabel	Native Tongue Music Publishing / Universal Music Publishing	Nominated
"I Said Hi" – Amy Shark	Amy Billings (p.k.a. Amy Shark)	Mushroom Music o.b.o. UNIFIED Music Publishing	Won
"We're Going Home" - Vance Joy	James Keogh (p.k.a. Vance Joy), Daniel Wilson	Mushroom Music o.b.o. UNIFIED Music Publishing / BMG Rights Management	Nominated

=== Rock Work of the Year ===
List of Rock Word of the Year nominees
Title and/or artist	Writer(s)	Publisher(s)	Result
"Confidence" – Ocean Alley	Nic Blom, Baden Donegal, Lach Galbraith, Mitch Galbraith, Angus Goodwin, Tom O'Brien	—N/a	Nominated
"Million Man" – The Rubens	Scott Baldwin, Elliott Margin, Sam Margin, Zaac Margin, William Zeglis	Mushroom Music o.b.o. Ivy League Music	Nominated
"Never Ever" – The Rubens featuring Sarah Aarons	Sarah Aarons, Elliott Margin, Sam Margin	MSony/ATV Music Publishing Allegro / Mushroom Music o.b.o. Ivy League Music	Won
"Slow Mover" – Angie McMahon	Angie McMahon	Kobalt Music Publishing	Nominated
"The Deepest Sighs, the Frankest Shadows" - Gang of Youths	David Le'aupepe	Universal Music Publishing	Nominated

=== Song of the Year ===
Title and/or artist	Writer(s)	Publisher(s)	Result
"I Said Hi" – Amy Shark	Amy Billings (p.k.a. Amy Shark)	Mushroom Music obo UNIFIED Music Publishing	Won
"Native Tongue" – Mojo Juju	De Luzuriaga Ruiz (p.k.a. Mojo Juju), Joel Ma, Rita Seumanutafa	Mushroom Music	Nominated
"Slow Mover" – Angie McMahon	Angie McMahon	Kobalt Music Publishing	Nominated
"Society" – Ainslie Wills	Ainslie Wills, Bram Inscore, MoZella	Sony/ATV Music Publishing Allegro / Kobalt Music Publishing / Sony/ATV Music Publishing	Nominated
"With the One I Love" – Paul Kelly	Paul Kelly	Sony/ATV Music Publishing	Nominated

=== Songwriter of the Year ===
- Sarah Aarons

=== Ted Albert Award for Outstanding Services to Australian Music ===
- Rob Potts

=== Outstanding International Achievement Award ===
Title and/or artist	Writer(s)	Publisher(s)	Result
Youngblood" – 5 Seconds of Summer	Calum Hood, Luke Hemmings, Ashton Irwin, Andrew Watt, Ali Tamposi, Louis Bell	Sony/ATV Music Publishing	Won

=== Urban Work of the Year ===
Title and/or artist	Writer(s)	Publisher(s)	Result
"Believe" – Bliss n Eso featuring Mario	Max MacKinnon, Jonathan Notley, PJ Harding, Cameron Ludik, Damian Smith	Mushroom Music / Universal Music Publishing	Nominated
"Clark Griswold" – Hilltop Hoods featuring Adrian Eagle	DJ Debris (Barry Francis), MC Pressure (Daniel Smith), Suffa (Matthew Lambert), John Bartlett, Paul Bartlett	Sony/ATV Music Publishing	Won
"I Miss You" – Thundamentals	Jeswon (Jesse Ferris), Morgs (Morgan Jones), Tuka (Brendan Tuckerman), Carl Dimataga	Sony/ATV Music Publishing Allegro	Nominated
"Marryuna" – Baker Boy featuring Yirrmal	Baker Boy, Dion Brownfield, Jerome Farah, Yirrmal Marika	Mushroom Music	Nominated
"Mr La Di Da Di" – Baker Boy	Baker Boy, Dion Brownfield, Jerome Farah, Dallas Woods	Mushroom Music	Nominated

== Art Music Awards ==
=== Instrumental Work of the Year ===
Title	Composer	Performer	Result
Ignis	Mary Finsterer	James Wannan (viola d'amore), Christopher Pidcock (cello)	Won
Piano Sonata	Elizabeth Younan	Joyce Yang	Nominated
Stalin's Piano	Robert Davidson	Sonya Lifschitz	Nominated
String Quartet No. 6	Andrew Ford	Flinders Quartet	Nominated

=== Jazz Work of the Year ===
Title	Composer	Performer	Result
Gratitude and Grief	Katie Noonan, Zac Hurren, Stephen Magnusson, Michael Leunig	Elixir et al.	Nominated
Love, As We Know It	Brenton Foster, Christopher Poindexter (lyricist)	Brenton Foster, Gideon Brazil, Stephen Magnusson, Aaron McCollough, Jordan Tarento	Nominated
Nothing Remains Unchanged	Ross McHenry	Ross McHenry Quartet	Nominated
Trombone Song Cycle	Joshua Kyle, Andrew Murray	Joshua Kyle (voice), James Greening, James Macauley, Jordan Murray and Adrian Sherriff (trombones), Andrew Murray (conductor)	Won

=== Orchestral Work of the Year ===
Title	Composer	Performer	Result
"Daccord: A Diary of Discourse"	Cathy Milliken	Jessica Aszodi, Vladimir Gorbach, Adelaide Symphony Orchestra, Benjamin Northey (conductor)	Nominated
Implacable Gifts (Concerto for Two Pianos and Orchestra)	Carl Vine	Kathryn Stott (piano), Piers Lane (piano), West Australian Symphony Orchestra, Rory Macdonald (conductor)	Won
"Lebewohl (Piano Concerto No. 3)"	Elena Kats-Chernin	Tamara-Anna Cislowska (piano), Queensland Symphony Orchestra, Alondra de la Parra (conductor)	Nominated
Ruler of the Hive	Melody Eötvös	Pamela Rabe (narrator), Tasmanian Symphony Orchestra, Marko Letonja (conductor)	Nominated

=== Vocal / Choral Work of the Year ===
Title	Composer / librettist	Performer	Result
In Due Season	Rachel Bruerville / Valerie Volk	Adelaide Chamber Singers	Nominated
The Audience Choir	Alice Chance	Ensemble Offspring with audience participation	Nominated
The Drowners	Andrew Ford / Tim Winton, George Barker, Georgiana Molloy, Bruce Dawe, Stevie Smith, William Shakespeare	Ruthless Jabiru, Morgan Pearse (baritone), Kelly Lovelady (conductor)	Nominated
The Howling Girls	Damien Ricketson, Adena Jacobs	Sydney Chamber Opera: Jane Sheldon (soprano); artists from The House That Dan Built (ensemble)	Won

=== Performance of the Year ===
Title	Composer / librettist	Performer	Result
Lorelei	Julian Langdon / Casey Bennetto, Gillian Cosgriff; concept by Ali McGregor	Ali McGregor, Antoinette Halloran, Dimity Shepherd, Victorian Opera Chamber Orchestra, Phoebe Briggs (musical director), Sarah Giles (director)	Nominated
Violin Sonata No. 1: Dark Matter	Matthew Hindson	Ray Chen, Julien Quentin	Nominated
Atlas of the Sky	Liza Lim / Bei Dao, Eliot Weinberger	Speak Percussion, Jessica Aszodi	Won
Breath of Thunder	Lachlan Skipworth	TaikOz, Riley Lee, Kaoru Watanabe, Sydney Symphony Orchestra, Gerard Salonga (conductor)	Nominated

=== Award for Excellence by an Individual ===
Individual	Work	Result
Brian Ritchie	Sustained contribution to the Australian music sector as a performer, curator and mentor	Nominated
Cat Hope	Leadership in the composition, performance and education of new music in Australia	Nominated
Lyn Williams	Significant contribution to the creation and performance of choral music in Australia	Won
Michelle Leonard	25 years championing Australian Art music	Nominated

=== Award for Excellence by an Organisation ===
Organisation	Work	Result
Canberra International Music Festival	Sustained creative excellence, exceptional growth and cultivation of Australian music	Nominated
City Recital Hall	Extended Play Festival of New Music	Nominated
Plexus	Sustained and creative contribution to Australian music culture	Nominated
Zephyr Quartet	2018 activities and 20 years of sustained contribution to the local, national and international arts scene	Won

=== Award for Excellence in Music Education ===
Organisation / individual	Work	Result
Musica Viva Australia	Musica Viva in Schools long-term music residency program	Nominated
Speak Percussion	Sounds Unheard education program	Nominated
Topology	Top Up music education program	Nominated
West Australian Symphony Orchestra	Crescendo, El Sistema-inspired free music education program	Won

=== Award for Excellence in a Regional Area ===
Organisation / individual	Work	Result
Moorambilla Voices	2018 activities and ongoing commitment to cultural competency and the creation of art music for youth from remote and rural NSW	Nominated
Queensland Symphony Orchestra	Gladstone Enrichment through Music program	Nominated
Steel City Strings	2018 activities and commitment to new Australian music	Won
Warren H Williams, Michael Sollis, Barkly Arts	One Sky Many Stories, inspiring audiences as they explore their relationship to the night sky, Indigenous culture and the world around us	Nominated

=== Award for Excellence in Experimental Music ===
Organisation / individual	Work	Result
Bendigo International Festival of Exploratory Music	Ongoing contribution	Won
Leah Barclay	Listening Underwater, a large-scale experimental music and acoustic ecology project	Nominated
Speak Percussion	Polar Force, an investigation of wind, water and ice through sound	Nominated
Thembi Soddell	Held Down, Expanding, an exploration of states of trauma and mental distress, and how these may be imagined sonically	Nominated

=== Award for Excellence in Jazz ===
Organisation / individual	Work	Result
Andrea Keller	New works, projects, recordings and educational output	Nominated
Jeremy Rose	High artistic excellence, and contribution to the creation, presentation and promotion of Australian jazz	Nominated
Niko Schäuble	Recording activities at Pughouse Studios	Nominated
Ross McHenry	Recording, international touring, residencies and commissions	Won

=== Distinguished Services to Australian Music ===
Organisation / individual	Result
The Necks	Won

== Screen Music Awards ==
Nominees and winners

=== Feature Film Score of the Year ===
Title	Composer	Result
Danger Close: The Battle of Long Tan	Caitlin Yeo	Nominated
I Am Mother	Dan Luscombe, Antony Partos	Won
Jirga	AJ True	Nominated
Judy and Punch	François Tétaz	Nominated

=== Best Music for an Advertisement ===
Title	Composer	Result
Dan Murphy's	Adrian Sergovich	Won
HP Indigo	Dmitri Golovko	Nominated
Jewel Changi Airport	Gerard Fitzgerald	Nominated
Where Inspiration Lives: Sydney Opera House	Caitlin Yeo	Nominated

=== Best Music for Children's Television ===
Title	Composer	Result
Bill & Tony: "Planet of the Socks"	Michael Lira	Nominated
Bluey: "Teasing"	Joff Bush	Nominated
The Bureau of Magical Things: "End of the Road"	Brett Aplin	Nominated
The Pilgrim's Progress	Michael Dooley	Won

=== Best Music for a Documentary ===
Title	Composer	Result
2040	Bryony Marks	Nominated
Australia's Lost Impressionist	David Bridie	Won
The Cult of the Family	Amanda Brown	Nominated
The Leunig Fragments	Luke Altmann	Nominated

=== Best Music for a Mini-Series or Telemovie ===
Title	Composer	Result
Dead Lucky	Michael Yezerski	Won
Fighting Season	Daniel Denholm	Nominated
Lambs of God	Bryony Marks	Nominated
Ms Fisher's Modern Murder Mysteries	Burkhard Dallwitz, Brett Aplin, Dmitri Golovko	Nominated

=== Best Music for a Short Film ===
Title	Composer	Result
Cernunnos	Rory Chenoweth	Nominated
For the Girl in the Coffee Shop	Angela Little	Won
Shiloh	Freya Berkhout	Nominated
Sohrab & Rustum	Burkhard Dallwitz	Nominated

=== Best Music for a Television Series or Serial ===
Series or Serial	Composer	Result
Bloom: "The Memory Box"	Jackson Milas, Antony Partos	Won
Secret City: Under the Eagle: "Run Little Rabbit"	David Bridie	Nominated
Tidelands: "Not One of You"	Matteo Zingales	Nominated
You Can't Ask That: "Alcoholics"	Andrew Sampford	Nominated

=== Best Original Song Composed for the Screen ===
Song title	Work	Composer	Result
"Be My Girl"	The Craft	Justin Shave	Nominated
"Day by Day"	Fourteen	Brontë Horder	Nominated
"Every Day My Mother's Voice"	The Final Quarter	Paul Kelly	Won
"Firesong"	Judy and Punch	Sophia Brous, François Tétaz, Mirrah Foulkes	Nominated

=== Best Soundtrack Album ===
Title	Composer	Result
2040	Bryony Marks	Nominated
Little Monsters	Piers Burbrook de Vere	Won
Me and My Left Brain	Cezary Skubiszewski	Nominated
The Merger	David Bridie	Nominated

=== Best Television Theme ===
Title	Composer	Result
Bloom	Antony Partos	Won
Dead Lucky	Michael Yezerski	Nominated
The Bureau of Magical Things	Brett Aplin	Nominated
The Pacific: In the Wake of Captain Cook with Sam Neill	Caitlin Yeo	Nominated

=== Most Performed Screen Composer – Australia ===
Composer	Result
Adam Gock, Dinesh Wicks	Won
Jay Stewart	Nominated
Mitch Stewart	Nominated
Neil Sutherland	Nominated

=== Most Performed Screen Composer – Overseas ===
Composer	Result
Alastair Ford	Nominated
Jed Kurzel	Nominated
Neil Sutherland	Won
Nerida Tyson-Chew	Nominated
