= Soda (album) =

Studio album by the Rubens
- Released: 20 September 2024
- Recorded: 2023–2024
- Studio: Camden
- Length: 38:33
- Label: Ivy League
- Producer: Konstantin Kersting

The Rubens chronology
| 0202 (2021) | Soda (2024) | Group Therapy (2026) |

Singles from Soda
- 1. "Pets and Drugs" Released: 19 May 2023; 2. "Good Mood" Released: 6 October 2023; 3. "Liquid Gold" Released: 9 February 2024; 4. "Black Balloon" Released: 3 May 2024; 5. "Soda" Released: 5 July 2024; 6. "Sunday Night" Released: 30 August 2024

Soda is the fifth studio album by Australian alternative rock group the Rubens. The album was released on 20 September 2024 by Ivy League Records.

Upon announcement of the album in July 2024 and speaking about its title track, the group said "We feel like it encapsulates the record, so it makes the most sense to name the album after it. It's a breakup song where the fault is all on you."

The album will be supported with national tour, commencing in Forth, Tasmania on 20 September 2024.

== Critical reception ==
Professional ratings
Review scores
| Source | Rating |
|---|---|
| Rolling Stone Australia | 3.5/5 stars |

Sarah Downs from Rolling Stone Australia said "Produced by longtime collaborator Konstantin Kersting, the album blends polished alt-rock grooves with hints of synths and electronics."

== Track listing ==
Soda track listing
| No. | Title | Writer(s) | Length |
|---|---|---|---|
| 1. | "Death Is a Friend" | | 4:06 |
| 2. | "Black Balloon" | Scott Baldwin; Elliott Margin; Izaac Margin; Sam Margin; William Zeglis | 4:00 |
| 3. | "Pets and Drugs" | Baldwin; E. Margin; I. Margin; S. Margin; Zeglis | 3:01 |
| 4. | "Good Mood" | Baldwin; E. Margin; I. Margin; S. Margin; Zeglis | 2:59 |
| 5. | "Cornerstore" | | 3:45 |
| 6. | "Sunday Night" | | 3:32 |
| 7. | "Soda" | Baldwin; E. Margin; I. Margin; S. Margin; Zeglis | 3:58 |
| 8. | "Talking to Horses" | | 3:00 |
| 9. | "Liquid Gold" | Baldwin; E. Margin; I. Margin; S. Margin; Zeglis | 2:59 |
| 10. | "Gone" | | 3:49 |
| 11. | "Roll Away" | | 3:24 |
| Total length: | | | 38:33 |

== Charts ==
=== Weekly charts ===
Weekly chart performance for Soda
| Chart (2024) | Peak position |
|---|---|
| Australian Albums (ARIA) | 4 |

=== Year-end charts ===
2024 year-end chart performance for Soda
| Chart (2024) | Position |
|---|---|
| Australian Artist Albums (ARIA) | 42 |

== Release history ==
| Region | Date | Format | Edition(s) | Label | Catalogue |
|---|---|---|---|---|---|
| Australia | 20 September 2024 | digital download; streaming; CD; LP | Standard / Limited Edition LP colours | Ivy League | IVY1108 - IVY1109 |
