= Million Man =

Single by The Rubens

from the album Lo La Ru
- Released: 27 October 2017
- Length: 3:12
- Label: Ivy League

The Rubens singles chronology
"Hold Me Back" (2016)	"Million Man" (2017)	"Never Ever" (2018)

Music video
- "Million Man" on YouTube

"Million Man" is a song by Australian alternative rock group The Rubens. The song was released on 27 October 2017 as the lead single from the group's third studio album, Lo La Ru. The song was certified gold in Australia in March 2019. Frontman Sam Margin sings lead vocals for the majority of the song, whilst keyboardist Elliott Margin sings lead vocals during the post-chorus section and backing vocals throughout the remainder of the song.

At the APRA Music Awards of 2019, the song was nominated for Rock Work of the Year.

== Background and release ==
The song was recorded in a former World War II communications bunker in Sydney's south west and was by brothers Torbitt and Wilder Schwartz, who they met after befriending them at a Laneway Festival back in 2013. The Rubens' Elliott Margin said "'Million Man' was the first track we worked on in the studio with the boys. It was genuinely just a fun time building the song and being creative together. The song itself kind of came from nowhere, just sitting at the piano and playing whatever came out. As the song developed, the lyrics slowly came and spelled out a story and the rest came from there. The chorus was an easy flowing one, which is rare."

== Music video ==
The music video was filmed in Brooklyn, directed by Brian Purnell and released on 28 November 2017. The Rubens' Elliott Margin told Billboard "We just wanted to do something that reflected the energy and fun of the song" adding "We haven't really written a song like this before, where there is that kind of energy a big chorus and it's a sing-along kind of thing. We wanted a video that matched that fun and energy and sing-along-edness... So we decided, 'Alright, we'll just get a couple of beers and plan a couple different shots over the day and night and see where we go from there.

== Reception ==
Al Newstead from ABC said "With its gospel-y vocal interjections and languid groove, 'Million Man' feels like a natural evolution from the [bands] Triple J Hottest 100 topper "Hoops".

Mushroom Music said called the track "infectious" and "ridiculously catchy" saying "The pop track features the perfect combination of rich vocals, sweet keyboard, gritty bass and soulful hooks, creating an irresistibly spontaneous mood".

== Certifications ==
Region	Certification	Certified units/sales
Australia (ARIA)	Gold	35,000^{‡}
^{‡} Sales+streaming figures based on certification alone.
