= Yuck (Alpine album) =

Studio album by Alpine
- Released: 12 June 2015
- Recorded: late 2014 to early 2015
- Studio: MOOF, Melbourne Victoria, Australia
- Length: 38:29
- Label: Ivy League Records
- Producer: Dann Hume, Christian O'Brien

Alpine chronology
A Is for Alpine (2012)	Yuck (2015)

Singles from A Is for Alpine
- 1. "Foolish" Released: April 2015; 2. "Damn Baby" Released: June 2015; 3. "Shot Fox" Released: September 2015

Yuck is the second and final studio album by the Australian group Alpine. The album The album was announced in April 2015, alongside its lead single "Foolish". The album was released on 12 June 2015, peaked at number 16 on the ARIA Charts and was supported by a national tour.

At the J Awards of 2015, the album was nominated for Australian Album of the Year.

== Reception ==
Carley Hall from The Music said "While Yuck's production can't be faulted... that pristine, sometimes cold quality of the girls' breathy pouting and the boys' perfectly quantised playing is so much more pervasive the second time around and renders it almost two-dimensional."

Matilda Edwards from Music Feeds said "Yuck is a daring leap of self-involvement, lust and narcissism and it's addictive." Edwards added "From conventional (and unbelievably catchy) pop tracks in 'Crunches' and 'Need Not Be' to a full brass section filling up the R&B-heavy 'Damn Baby', it's certainly a versatile record."

Emma Rose from Acid Stag said "Yuck reflects a new sound of sophistication and maturity". Rose added "Though sticking to its classic indie pop style, Alpine is pushing pop boundaries through the rhythmic intricacy and superb lyrical work that encompasses the album."

Adrian Spinelli from Paste (magazine) said "Ultimately, Yuck is more pop balladry that successfully distances itself from the seemingly defunct Aussie synth-pop movement, and that serves them well."

Andy Beta from NPR called the album "charming" but said "a blithe sound can't quite mask the doubt and hesitation at the heart of the songs."

James Christopher Monger from AllMusic said "Yuck finds Alpine doubling down on the cosmopolitan, Ibiza-ready synth-pop side of their 2012 debut, offering up an immaculately crafted ten-track set that's so judicious in its sonic precision it almost doesn't register."

== Track listing ==
- all songs written by Alpine.
1. "Come On" - 3:45
2. "Foolish" - 3:22
3. "Crunches" - 3:37
4. "Shot Fox" - 3:47
5. "Up for Air" - 3:49
6. "Jellyfish" - 3:31
7. "Much More" - 4:04
8. "Damn Baby" - 4:04
9. "Standing Not Sleeping" - 3:25
10. "Need Not Be" - 4:37
11. "So Long" (bonus track) - 4:48
12. "Saturn" (bonus track) - 3:04
13. "Bold Digger" (bonus track) - 3:37

== Charts ==
=== Weekly charts ===
Chart (2015)	Peak position
Australian Albums (ARIA)	16
