= The Rubens (album) =

Studio album by The Rubens
- Released: 14 September 2012
- Genres: Alternative; pop; rock
- Length: 38:21
- Label: Ivy League
- Producer: David Kahne

The Rubens chronology
The Rubens (2012)	Hoops (2015)

Alternative cover
- 2013 Deluxe edition

Singles from The Rubens
- 1. "Don't Ever Want to Be Found" Released: 14 May 2012; 2. "My Gun" Released: 4 August 2012; 3. "The Best We Got" Released: November 2012; 4. "Never Be the Same" Released: June 2013

The Rubens is the debut studio album by Australian alternative rock group, The Rubens. The album was released on 14 September 2012 and reached number 3 on the Australian Albums Chart.

A deluxe edition was released on 26 April 2013, featuring 8 additional tracks, 7 of which are live tracks recorded live at The Forum in Melbourne on 15 September 2012.

At the J Awards of 2012, the album was nominated for Australian Album of the Year.

The album was nominated for Breakthrough Artist – Release and Best Rock Album at the ARIA Music Awards of 2013.

== Reception ==
Matt Collar from AllMusic gave the album 4 out of 5, saying; "Australian rock outfit the Rubens' 2012 self-titled debut showcases the band's dark, melodic soulful pop. The album finds the band splitting the difference between a Baroque, piano-driven '60s pop approach and a contemporary, bass-heavy garage rock sound. Think Britain's Ed Harcourt meets the Black Keys."

== Track listing ==
Standard edition
No.	Title	Writer(s)	Length
1.	"The Best We Got"	David Kahne; The Rubens	3:55
2.	"My Gun"	Kahne; The Rubens	3:10
3.	"Never Be the Same"	Kahne; The Rubens	3:24
4.	"Lay It Down"	Kahne; The Rubens	3:51
5.	"Be Gone"	Kahne; The Rubens	2:59
6.	"Elvis"	The Rubens	3:20
7.	"The Day You Went Away"	Kahne; The Rubens	3:14
8.	"I'll Surely Die"	The Rubens	3:45
9.	"Look Good, Feel Good"	Kahne; The Rubens; Dean Tuza	3:31
10.	"Don't Ever Want to Be Found"	Kahne; The Rubens	3:19
11.	"Paddy"	Kahne; The Rubens	3:53
Total length:			38:21

The Rubens — Deluxe edition bonus tracks
No.	Title	Length
1.	"Cowboy"	3:06
2.	"The Best We Got" (live)	3:43
3.	"Elvis" (live)	3:37
4.	"My Gun" (live)	2:57
5.	"The Day You Went Away" (live)	3:20
6.	"Don't Ever Want to Be Found" (live)	2:56
7.	"Never Be the Same" (live)	4:12
8.	"Lay It Down" (live)	3:38
Total length:		27:29

== Charts ==
=== Weekly charts ===
Chart (2012)	Peak position
Australian Albums (ARIA)	3

=== Year-end charts ===
Chart (2012)	Rank
Australian Albums Chart	56
Australian Artist Albums Chart	14

Chart (2013)	Rank
Australian Albums Chart	96
Australian Artist Albums Chart	27

== Certifications ==
Region	Certification	Certified units/sales
Australia (ARIA)	Platinum	70,000^{^}
^{^} Shipments figures based on certification alone.

== Release history ==
Region	Date	Format	Edition(s)	Label	Catalogue
Australia	14 September 2012	CD; digital download	Standard	Ivy League	IVY173
Australia	26 April 2013	CD; digital download	Deluxe	Ivy League	IVY184
Australia	April 2017	LP	Standard	Ivy League	IVY356
Australia	September 2022	LP	10th anniversary repress	Ivy League	IVY356 / IVY865
