= D.D Dumbo =

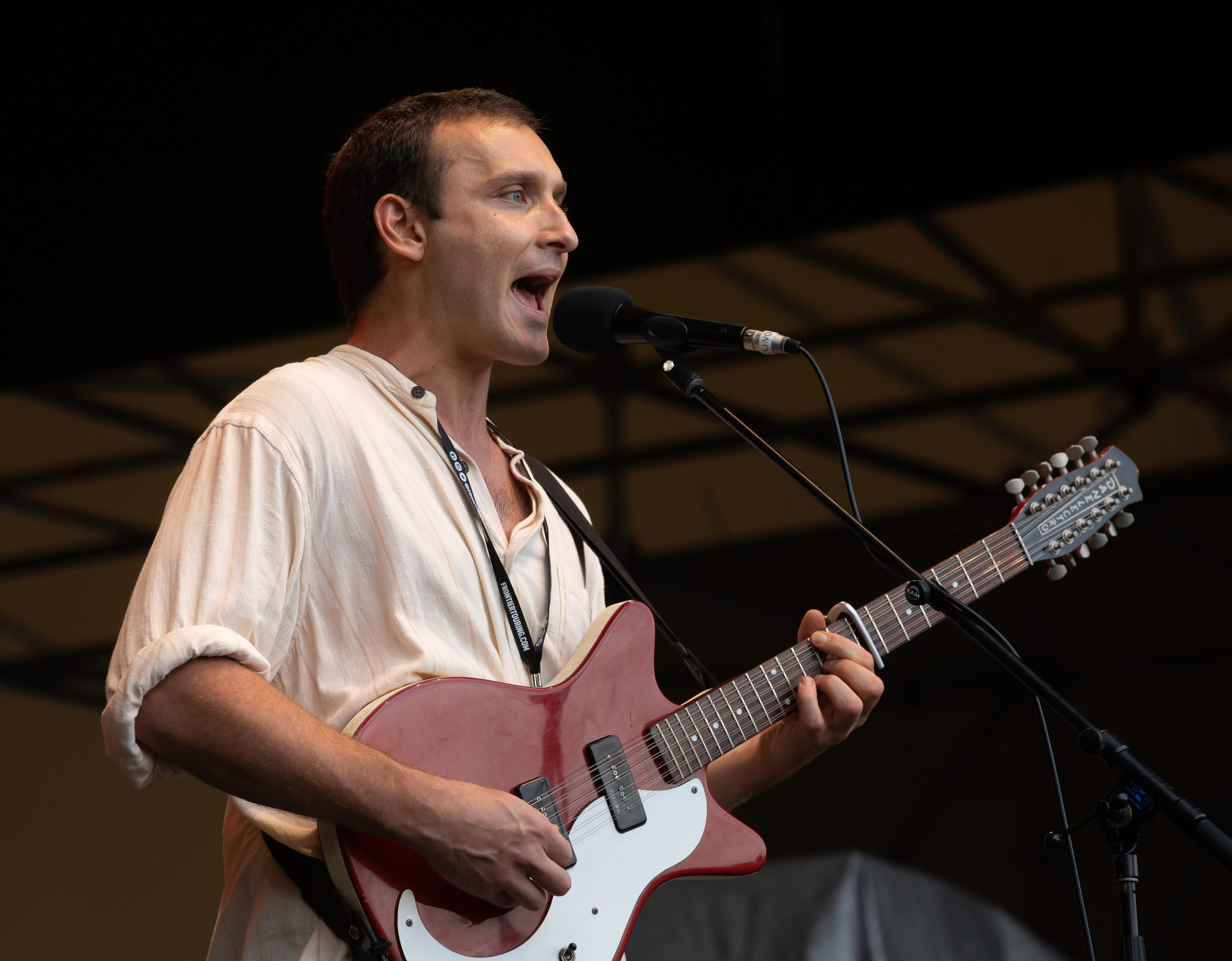

Background information
- Born: Oliver Hugh Perry
- Origin: Castlemaine, Victoria, Australia
- Genres: Electronica, indie rock
- Occupation: Musician
- Instruments: Vocals, guitar
- Years active: 2013–2018
- Label: 4AD

D.D Dumbo was the solo project of the Australian singer-songwriter Oliver Hugh Perry. The project began in Castlemaine in 2013, with the release of his debut EP Tropical Oceans occurring later that year via The Blue Rider. Perry supported the likes of Warpaint, tUnE-yArDs, St. Vincent, Jungle and Iron & Wine in Australia throughout 2013. He was then invited to attend South by Southwest in Austin, Texas, where he was signed by 4AD who re-released Tropical Oceans in 2014. In 2014, D.D Dumbo played his first shows in the UK and the US, supporting both Daughter and Tame Impala. He also played at Splendour in the Grass that July, as well as Pitchfork Festival in Paris. His debut album Utopia Defeated was recorded over the winter of 2015 and released on 7 October 2016 by Liberation in Australia and New Zealand and 4AD in the rest of the world. The album was released to positive reviews from FasterLouder, Rolling Stone Australia, and AllMusic. In November 2016, D.D Dumbo was nominated for two J Award, for Best Music Video and Best Australian Album, winning the latter.

In February 2017, D.D Dumbo performed at St Jerome's Laneway Festival, as well as winning Song of the Year at the APRA Music Awards of 2017 for "Satan". He was also nominated for four awards in the 2017 ARIA Awards, including Best Adult Contemporary Album, Best Male Artist, Engineer of the Year and Producer Of The Year. Perry's final shows as D.D Dumbo to date took place at the 2018 Laneway Festival. Following the cancellation of his appearance at that year's Yours & Owls Festival, Perry effectively went off-grid and did not share any new updates or music for eight years.

In May 2026, Perry reactivated the D.D Dumbo Instagram account, sharing a post of warped archival footage using a quote from John Sanbonmatsu as its caption that was set to an unreleased ambient instrumental piece.

== Discography ==
=== Studio albums ===
Title	Details
Utopia Defeated	Released: 7 October 2016; Label: Liberation Records; Format: CD, digital download, streaming

=== Extended plays ===
Title	Details
Tropical Oceans	Released: 27 October 2014; Label: D.D. Dumbo; Format: digital download, streaming

=== Singles ===
Year	Title	Album
2013	"Tropical Oceans"	Tropical Oceans
2014	"Crying"	Tropical Oceans
2016	"Satan"	Utopia Defeated
2016	"Walrus"	Utopia Defeated
2017	"Brother"	Utopia Defeated

== Awards and nominations ==
=== Australian Music Prize ===
The Australian Music Prize (the AMP) is an annual award of $30,000 given to an Australian band or solo artist in recognition of the merit of an album released during the year of award. It commenced in 2005.

Year	Nominee / work	Award	Result
2016	Utopia Defeated	Australian Music Prize	Nominated

=== AIR Awards ===
The Australian Independent Record Awards (commonly known informally as AIR Awards) is an annual awards night to recognise, promote and celebrate the success of Australia's Independent Music sector.

Year	Nominee / work	Award	Result
2014	themselves	Breakthrough Independent Artist	Nominated
2017	themselves	Best Independent Artist	Nominated
2017	themselves	Breakthrough Independent Artist	Nominated
2017	Utopia Defeated	Best Independent Album	Nominated
2017	"Satan"	Best Independent Single or EP	Nominated

=== APRA Awards ===
The APRA Awards are presented annually from 1982 by the Australasian Performing Right Association (APRA), "honouring composers and songwriters".

Year	Nominee / work	Award	Result
2017	"Satan"	Song of the Year	Won

=== ARIA Music Awards ===
The ARIA Music Awards is an annual awards ceremony that recognises excellence, innovation, and achievement across all genres of Australian music.

Year	Nominee / work	Award	Result
2017	Utopia Defeated	Best Male Artist	Nominated
2017	Utopia Defeated	Best Adult Contemporary Album	Nominated
2017	Oliver Hugh Perry & Fabian Prynn for Utopia Defeated	Producer of the Year	Nominated
2017	Oliver Hugh Perry & Fabian Prynn for Utopia Defeated	Engineer of the Year	Nominated

=== J Awards ===
The J Awards are an annual series of Australian music awards that were established by the Australian Broadcasting Corporation's youth-focused radio station Triple J. The awards are given in an on-air ceremony held in November each year as part of triple j's AusMusic Month.

Year	Nominee / work	Award	Result
2016	Utopia Defeated	Australian Album of the Year	Won
2016	"Satan" by D.D Dumbo (directed by Jim Elson)	Australian Video of the Year	Nominated

=== Music Victoria Awards ===
The Music Victoria Awards are an annual awards night celebrating Victorian music. They commenced in 2006.

Year	Nominee / work	Award	Result	Ref.
2014	D.D Dumbo	Best Emerging Artist	Nominated	
2014	D.D Dumbo	Best Regional Act	Nominated	
2015	D.D Dumbo	Best Regional Act	Nominated	
2016	D.D Dumbo	Best Regional Act	Nominated	
2017	D.D Dumbo	Best Male Artist	Nominated	
2017	D.D Dumbo	Best Regional Act	Nominated	
