= 0202 =

Studio album by the Rubens
- Released: 12 February 2021
- Length: 39:03
- Label: Ivy League
- Producer: The Rubens, Konstantin Kersting, Eric J, Rob Amoruso

The Rubens chronology
MTV Unplugged (2019)	0202 (2021)	Soda (2024)

Singles from 0202
- 1. "Live in Life" Released: 14 November 2019; 2. "Heavy Weather" Released: 21 April 2020; 3. "Time of My Life" Released: 9 September 2020; 4. "Masterpiece" Released: 8 December 2020; 5. "Muddy Evil Pain" Released: 27 January 2021

0202 is the fourth studio album by Australian alternative rock group the Rubens, released on 12 February 2021 by Ivy League Records.

The album was announced on 15 October 2020, alongside the release of the video for the album's third single, "Time of My Life". After releasing "Live in Life" in November 2019, the group were looking towards a release date of mid-2020 for the album, however, due to COVID-19 restrictions, progress and the postponed Live in Life Tour from March 2020, the album was delayed.

The title 0202 refers to a "forward-thinking album for a backward year". In a press statement, the band said "We're so bloody proud of this album and the way we created it, and we can't believe how lucky we are to have made it this far."

The album was supported by an Australian tour commencing in April 2021.

At the 2021 ARIA Music Awards, Konstantin Kersting was nominated for Producer of the Year and Engineer of the Year for work on this album. Eric J Dubowsky was also nominated for Engineer of the Year for work on this album.

At the AIR Awards of 2022, the album was nominated for Best Independent Pop Album or EP.

== Critical reception ==
Professional ratings
Review scores
Source	Rating
The Newcastle Herald	4/5 stars

Josh Leeson from The Newcastle Herald said the group have "...taken significant steps towards pop and R'n'B... and the Rubens sound all the better for it"; concluding with "0202 might be named after the most horrible year in recent memory for most people, but the Rubens have delivered an upbeat slice of pop sweetness."

Zoë Radas from Stack Magazine said the Rubens are "emerging with a classy collection of tunes that document a topsy-turvy year. Self-produced, the songs have a distinct pop sheen, though the cruisy vibe often belies a darker edge."

Triple J said "The Rubens have come out of 2020—the backward year—with a body of work which sees the band continue to push and expand themselves creatively and sonically. Self-producing their own work for the very first time, The Rubens bring to life their infectious energy in a 12-track alt-pop, RnB, pop and hip hop infused record."

== Track listing ==
0202 track listing
No.	Title	Writer(s)	Length
1.	"Masterpiece"	Scott Baldwin; Elliott Margin; Izaac Margin; Sam Margin; William Zeglis	3:36
2.	"Heavy Weather"	Baldwin; E. Margin; I. Margin; S. Margin; Zeglis	3:25
3.	"Live in Life"	Baldwin; E. Margin; I. Margin; S. Margin; Zeglis	3:35
4.	"Time of My Life"	Michael Jade; E. Margin; I. Margin; S. Margin	2:35
5.	"Thank You"	Luke Fitton; E. Margin; I. Margin; S. Margin	2:50
6.	"Muddy Evil Pain"	Baldwin; E. Margin; I. Margin; S. Margin; Zeglis	3:41
7.	"Holiday"	Baldwin; E. Margin; I. Margin; S. Margin; Zeglis	3:50
8.	"Explosions"	Baldwin; E. Margin; I. Margin; S. Margin; Zeglis	2:37
9.	"State of My Mind"	Sarah Aarons; E. Margin; I. Margin; S. Margin	3:12
10.	"Apple"	Baldwin; E. Margin; I. Margin; S. Margin; Zeglis	3:07
11.	"Back to Back"	Baldwin; E. Margin; I. Margin; S. Margin; Zeglis	3:14
12.	"Party"	Baldwin; E. Margin; I. Margin; S. Margin; Zeglis	2:39
Total length:			39:03

== Personnel ==
The Rubens

- Sam Margin – vocals, guitar (1–12)
- Scott Baldwin – drums (1–12)
- Elliott Margin – keyboards, vocals (1–12)
- Izaac Margin – lead guitar (1–12)
- William Zeglis – bass guitar (1–12)

== Charts ==
=== Weekly charts ===
Chart performance for 0202
Chart (2021)	Peak position
Australian Albums (ARIA)	1

=== Year-end charts ===
Chart (2021)	Position
Australian Artist Albums (ARIA)	29

== Release history ==
Region	Date	Format	Edition(s)	Label	Catalogue
Australia	12 February 2021	digital download; streaming; CD; LP	Standard	Ivy League	IVY650 / IVY651
