= Life Is Better Blonde =

- Born: Melbourne, Victoria, Australia
- Genres: Electronic music, indie
- Years active: 2015–present
- Labels: Life Is Better Blonde
- Website: lifeisbetterblonde.com

Life Is Better Blonde is an Australian Electronic, Indie group from Melbourne, Australia.

At the J Awards of 2015, the group won Australian Music Video of the Year for "Mine".

== Discography ==
=== Extended plays ===
Title	Details
Space + Tyres	Released:30 June 2017; Label: Life Is Better Blonde; Format: digital download, streaming
Like Me	Released: 27 September 2019; Label: Life Is Better Blonde; Format: digital download, streaming
Sad	Released: 31 July 2020; Label: Life Is Better Blonde; Format: digital download, streaming

=== Singles ===
Year	Title	Album
2015	"Mine"	Space + Tyres
2015	"Follow Me"	Space + Tyres
2016	"Swim Good"	non album single
2017	"Fires"	Space + Tyres
2018	"Strange Organism"	Like Me
2019	"My God Is Not Going to Like You"	Like Me
2019	"Winter" (featuring Angus Dawson)	Like Me
2019	"Ghosts"	Like Me
2020	"GTFO"	non album single
2020	"Fires II"	Sad
2020	"Is It Too Late?"	Sad
2020	"Keeper"	Sad

== Awards and nominations ==
=== J Award ===
The J Awards are an annual series of Australian music awards that were established by the Australian Broadcasting Corporation's youth-focused radio station Triple J. They commenced in 2005.

Year	Nominee / work	Award	Result
J Awards of 2015	"Mine"	Australian Video of the Year	Won
