= Tired Lion =

Australian indie rock band

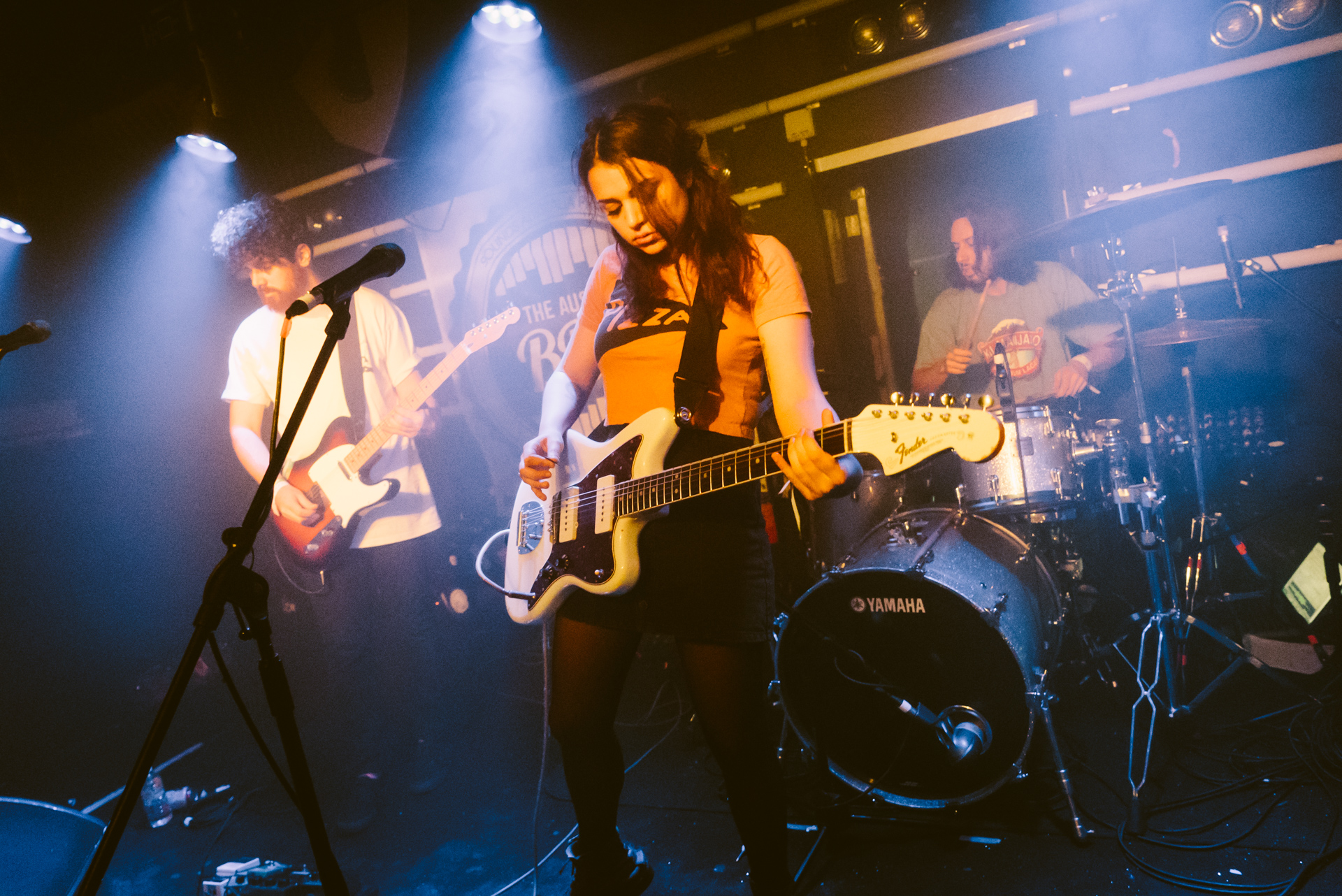
- Tired Lion at The Great Escape 2017

Background information
- Origin: Perth, Western Australia
- Genres: Indie rock; grunge
- Years active: 2010–present
- Labels: Dew Process; Universal Music Australia; Island Records
- Members: Sophie Hopes
- Past members: Ethan Darnell; Matt Tanner; Nick Vasey
- Website: www.tiredlion.com.au

Tired Lion are an Australian indie rock band formed in Perth in 2010. With a lineup consisting of singer/guitarist Sophie Hopes, lead guitarist Matt Tanner, bassist Nick Vasey, and drummer Ethan Darnell, the group released two EPs: All We Didn't Know in 2013 and Figurine in 2015. Rising to prominence with their single "I Don't Think You Like Me" from the latter EP, Tired Lion won the J Award for Unearthed Artist of 2015. They performed at Splendour in the Grass as a result, and continued to tour extensively, including at the Glastonbury Festival 2016. Their debut album, Dumb Days, was released in September 2017, produced by Violent Soho's Luke Boerdam.

== History ==
Hopes and Tanner attended the same high school in Perth, initially performing acoustic folk music together, before branching out to songwriting, inspired by busking in Fremantle and listening to The Smashing Pumpkins' Siamese Dream. The addition of schoolmate Darnell on drums, and of a Boss DS-1 pedal, led the band's sound to develop. Early names for the group included The Love Band and Space Boy, until one of the band's initial bassists suggested Tired Lion. Vasey later joined as the band's bassist, completing the current lineup.

Tired Lion supported several acts on tour, such as Violent Soho, Gyroscope, Spiderbait, The 1975, British India, Kingswood, and Luca Brasi. Some of their numerous festival appearances include Homebake, Groovin' the Moo, Falls Festival, Southbound, Reading and Leeds Festivals, and Primavera Sound.

On Tuesday 6 March 2018, Guitarist Matt Tanner stated via Facebook that he would be parting ways with the band after having played guitar with them since their inception. Tanner cited "personal reasons" as his motivation behind the departure.

== Members ==
Current members

- Sophie Hopes – lead vocals, guitar (2010–present)

Current touring musicians

- Antonia Hickey – bass, backing vocals (2019–present)
- Jay Clive – drums (2020–present)
- James Eyre Walker – lead guitar, backing vocals, sampler (2021–present)

Past members

- Matt Tanner – lead guitar, backing vocals (2010–2018)
- Ethan Darnell – drums (2010–2019)
- Nick Vasey – bass, backing vocals (2013–2019)

Past touring musicians

- Joel Martin – lead guitar (2018–2019)
- Luke Boerdram – lead guitar, backing vocals (2019)
- Michael Richards – drums (2019–2020)
- Tim Maxwell – lead guitar (2020)
- Michael Hardy – drums (2020)
- Caleb Anderson – lead guitar, backing vocals (2020–2021)

== Discography ==
=== Studio albums ===
Title	Details	Peak chart positions
Title	Details	AUS
Dumb Days	Released: September 2017.; Label: Dew Process, Universal Music Australia (DEW9001000); Format: CD, LP, digital download, streaming	21
Breakfast for Pathetics	Released: 2020; Label: Dew Process, Universal Music Australia (DEW9001262); Format: CD, LP, digital download, streaming	44

=== EPs ===
Title	Details
All We Didn't Know	Released: 2013; Label: Firestarter Distribution (FIRE2007111); Format: CD, digital download
Figurine	Released: 2015; Label: Firestarter Distribution (FIRE2007136); Format: CD, LP digital download

=== Singles ===
Year	Title	Album
2013	"For The Wolfman"	Non-album single
2013	"Desperate"	All We Didn't Know
2014	"Are You Listening... Listener?"	All We Didn't Know
2015	"I Don't Think You Like Me"	Figurine
2015	"Suck"	Figurine
2016	"Not My Friends"	Non-album singles
2016	"Agoraphobia"	Non-album singles
2017	"Cinderella Dracula"	Dumb Days
2017	"Fresh"	Dumb Days
2017	"Dumb Days"	Dumb Days
2018	"Where Were You?"	Dumb Days
2018	"With Or Without"	Non-album singles
2020	"Waterbed"	Breakfast for Pathetics
2020	"Lie to Me"	Breakfast for Pathetics
2020	"~Cya Later~"	Breakfast for Pathetics

=== Music videos ===
Year	Title	Album	Director	Reference
2014	"Are You Listening... Listener?"	All We Didn't Know	Steve Browne	
2015	"I Don't Think You Like Me"	Figurine	Sophie Hopes	
2015	"Suck"	Figurine	Jacob Kemp	
2016	"Not My Friends"	Non-album singles	Jeff Andersen Jnr.	
2016	"Agoraphobia"	Non-album singles	Matsu	
2017	"Cinderella Dracula"	Dumb Days	Matsu	
2017	"Fresh"	Dumb Days	Matt Sav	
2017	"Dumb Days"	Dumb Days	Matsu	
2018	"Where Were You?"	Dumb Days		
2019	"With Or Without"	Non-album single		
2020	Waterbed	Breakfast for Pathetics		
2020	"Lie To Me"	Breakfast for Pathetics		
2020	"~Cya Later~"	Breakfast for Pathetics		

== Awards and nominations ==
J Awards

Year	Nominee / work	Award	Result
J Awards of 2015	Tired Lion	Unearthed Artist of the Year	Won

WAM Song of the Year

Year	Nominee / work	Award	Result (wins only)
2014	"I Don't Think You Like Me"	Rock Song of the Year	Won

West Australian Music Industry Awards

Year	Nominee / work	Award	Result
2014	Tired Lion	Most Popular Live Act	Nominated
2015	Tired Lion	Best Rock Act	Won
2015	Tired Lion	Most Popular Act	Nominated
2015	Figurine	Best EP	Won
2015	"I Don't Think You Like Me"	Best Single	Nominated
2015	Sophie Hopes	Best Female Vocalist	Nominated
2016	Tired Lion	Best Pop Act	Nominated
2016	Tired Lion	Best Rock Act	Won
2016	Tired Lion	Most Popular Act	Nominated
2016	Tired Lion	Most Popular Live Act	Nominated
2016	"Not My Friends"	Best Single	Nominated
2016	"Not My Friends"	Most Popular Music Video	Nominated
