= Melody Eötvös =

- Born: 1984 (age 41–42); Southern Highlands, New South Wales, Australia
- Occupation: Composer
- Instruments: piano, cello
- Website: melodyeotvos.com

Melody Eötvös (born 1984) is an Australian composer of classical music.

== Life and career ==
Eötvös was born to a musical family. Her father was a jazz musician and her mother was a pianist. She began studying music theory and piano aged 5, before learning cello at age 8. She had also completed her first composition that year, a cello duet. She obtained a degree in musical composition at the Queensland Conservatory under the tutelage of Gerardo Dirié. She went on to receive a doctorate in music from the Jacobs School of Music at Indiana University, and a master's degree in music from the Royal Academy of Music in London.

In 2009 she received her first major award, the APRA Professional Development Award in Classical Music Composition (APRA Music Awards), that included $16,000 in study and travel grants.

Her compositions have been performed by orchestras around the world, including cities London, Tasmania, and Philadelphia. She is also a lecturer at the Melbourne Conservatory of Music.

Her work Ruler of the Hive was a finalist in the 2019 2019 APRA Music Awards.

In April 2020 the Queensland Symphony Orchestra premiered a work commissioned from Eötvös.

== Awards ==
- APRA Professional Development Classical Award (2009)
- 3MBS National Composers Award (2009)
- Soundstream National Composer Award (2012)
- Gallipoli Songs composition competition (2014)
- Seattle Metropolitan Chamber Orchestra International Composition Competition (2016)
- Red Note Music Festival (2017)

== Musical works ==
=== Solo ===
- Antumbra (2022)
- Piano sonata No.2 From the sand dunes (2021)
- Pilgrimado (2021)
- Gestumblindi (2020)
- The Waves (2017)
- Piano Sonata No.1 (2015)
- Dendrologe (2015)
- Beyond Lylth (2014)
- Ceptractli (2010)
- Six Minikins (2012)

=== Chamber ===
- Hope. Fear. Anything. (2022)
- Gamma (2022)
- About The Ash Lad (2020)
- The Baron in the Trees (2020)
- The Light Form (2019)
- Street of the Four Winds (2019)
- October in The Chair (2017)
- The Three Alcids (2016)
- Tradigradus (2017)
- Sericulture (2016)
- A Stranger Manuscript Found in a Copper Cylinder (2016)
- After the Zooids (2016)
- Wild October Jones (2015)
- Olbers Dance in the Dark (Rev. 2015)
- House of the beehives (2015)
- Wakeford Songs I: By Train (2015)
- The Aquatic Guide to Swimming (2015)
- Leafcutter (2012)
- The King in Yellow (2012)
- How Dragonflies Cross The Ocea (2012)

=== Orchestral ===
- PYRAMIDION (2022)
- SONARMILO (2022)
- When it hits the ocean below (2022)
- HIC SVNT DRACONES (2022)
- Meraki (2020)
- The Deciding machine (2020)
- Gravity Hill (2020)
- Hidden Wiring (2020)
- How To Grow Your Own Glacier (2020)
- Solar Wolves (2019)
- Ruler of The Hive (2018)
- Nanbunums Water (2017)
- The Saqqara Bird (2016)
- Red Dirt|Silver Rain (2015)
- Beatles, Dragons and Dreamers (2013)
- Huygens Principle (2009)
- Attic Tragedy (2008)
- Two Brave Apples in Winter (2007)

=== Vocal ===
- Hope. Fear. Anything. (2022)
- MEditations (On Being) (2020)
- Pilgrimado (2021)
- Gestumblindi (2020)
- A Stranger Manuscript Found in a Copper Cylinder (2016)
- Wakeford Song I: By Train (2014)
- The Intoxicated Poet (2009)

=== Multimedia ===
- After The Zooids (2015)
- House of The Beehives (2015)
- Patosis II: Sow (2012)
- Shoulder Pieces (2012)
- A Sample of The Atmosphere (2011)
- Patosis I: Blue (2010)
- Die Hohle Hohle (2009)
