= A Is for Alpine =

Studio album by Alpine
- Released: 10 August 2012
- Studios: The Stables, Victoria, Australia
- Genre: pop rock
- Length: 41:48
- Label: Ivy League Records
- Producer: Dann Hume

Alpine chronology
| Zürich (2010) | A Is for Alpine (2012) | Yuck (2015) |

Singles from A Is for Alpine
- 1. "Hands" Released: November 2011; 2. "Gasoline" Released: June 2012; 3. "Seeing Red" Released: October 2012

A Is for Alpine is the debut studio album by the Australian group Alpine. The album was announced in June 2012 with co-vocalist Pheobe Baker describing the album as a document of the band's "innocent and not so innocent explorations through our early twenty-something emotions".

The album was released on 10 August 2012 and peaked at number 11 on the ARIA Charts. The album was supported with a nation tour through August and September 2012.

At the EG Awards of 2012, the album won Best Album.

At the J Awards of 2012, the album was nominated for Australian Album of the Year.

At the 2012 ARIA Music Awards, the album was nominated for ARIA Award for Breakthrough Artist – Release.

== Reception ==
Madeleine Laing from The Music called it "an assured and polished debut, but it feels like the band is a little too comfortable in this sound, and that a little more experimentation might lift the whole album to the level of their killer singles."

Corey Tonkin from Tone Deaf said "Everything about A is for Alpine might softly say dreamy guitar-driven pop, but the consistent quality isn't so reserved. Alpine have nailed their sound across the thirty-eight minutes of their debut."

Fred Thomas from AllMusic said "With their debut full-length A Is for Alpine, Australian six-piece indie electro-pop act Alpine create an atmosphere of almost sterilised pop perfection, built on sparklingly clean production, cold dynamics and sharp harmonies from dual lead vocalists Phoebe Baker and Lou James." Thomas added "Though these songs seem tailor-made for the dancefloor, somehow they're best enjoyed in the late hours of the night or in a solitary, reflective headspace."

== Track listing ==
- all songs written by Alpine.
1. "Lovers 1" - 2:02
2. "Lovers 2" - 2:26
3. "Hands" - 3:16
4. "Villages" - 4:32
5. "Softsides" - 4:05
6. "Seeing Red" - 3:50
7. "Gasoline" - 3:23
8. "All for One" - 3:27
9. "Too Safe" - 3:39
10. "In the Wild" - 3:12
11. "The Vigour" - 3:16
12. "Multiplication" - 4:29

== Charts ==
=== Weekly charts ===
| Chart (2012) | Peak position |
|---|---|
| Australian Albums (ARIA) | 11 |
