= Falling Asleep at the Wheel (song) =

2019 single by The Rubens and Vic Mensa

Single by The Rubens and Vic Mensa
- Released: 23 July 2019
- Length: 3:11
- Label: Ivy League
- Songwriters: Gregory Hein; Adam Kobylarz; Elliott Margin; Izaac Margin; Sam Margin; Victor Mensah
- Producers: The Rubens; Snakechild; Gregory Hein

The Rubens and Vic Mensa singles chronology
"God Forgot" (2018)	"Falling Asleep at the Wheel" (2019)	"Live in Life" (2019)

"Falling Asleep at the Wheel" is a song by Australian alternative rock group The Rubens and American rapper Vic Mensa. The song was released on 23 July 2019. The Ruben premiered "Falling Asleep at the Wheel" on 21 July as a live performance at Australia's Splendour in the Grass music festival. Following the set, the track had its radio debut by Zane Lowe on Beats 1 Radio.

Sam Margin said of the track "We wrote this track in LA earlier in the year and immediately fell in love with it. We wanted to make something out of the box musically and really push the song into new territory for us as a band. I've been a fan of Vic Mensa for a while now and think he is one of the most interesting and creative forces in hip hop right now." Mensa said "The Rubens are fantastic, was honoured to jump on this track. Look out for the boys coming to the US with a big wave."

== Critical reception ==
Sose Fuamoli from Triple J said "The latest from the Sydney group is driven by slick, glossy production, bringing The Rubens into a more beats-driven environment. The addition of Mensa on the track is seamless, with his flow interweaving with the funk slaps of the bass and driving electronics. As a foil for Sam Margin's gravelly pop vocal, Mensa proves complementary."

Aupium reviewed the song saying "It's a smooth arrangement of arrhythmic beats where Vic's breakneck vocals soar as we're taken between exhilarating and chill-down yelps."
