= Live in Life =

2019 single by The Rubens

Single by The Rubens

from the album 0202
- Released: 14 November 2019
- Length: 3:36
- Label: Ivy League
- Songwriters: Scott Baldwin; Elliott Margin; Izaac Margin; Sam Margin; William Zeglis
- Producers: The Rubens; Konstantin Kersting

The Rubens singles chronology
"Falling Asleep at the Wheel" (2019)	"Live in Life" (2019)	"Heavy Weather" (2020)

Music video
- "Live in Life" on YouTube

"Live in Life" is a song by Australian alternative rock group The Rubens. The song was released on 14 November 2019 as the lead single from the group's fourth studio album, 0202 (2021). The song has peaked at number 21 on the ARIA Charts.

The Ruben's Sam Margin explained the meaning of the song during its premiere on Triple J: "I see it as this guy who has messed up and lost someone in his life, and he's telling himself 'No, this is fine. Change is fine, I'm ok with this'. But then realising he's not ok and trying to rectify things but realises it's too late."

The song won Most Performed Alternative Work at the APRA Music Awards of 2021.

== Music video ==
The music video was directed by Luca Watson and Harry Welsh and released on 9 December 2019.

== Critical reception ==
Al Newstead from Triple J said the song "incorporates sleeker pop production and ups the beat factor for a track that follows a narrator over the course of one night during the back-and-forth of a relationship breakdown."

== Track listing ==
Digital download
No.	Title	Writer(s)	Producer(s)	Length
1.	"Live in Life"	Scott Baldwin; Elliott Margin; Izaac Margin; Sam Margin; William Zeglis	The Rubens; Konstantin Kersting	3:36

Digital download — Remix EP
No.	Title	Writer(s)	Producer(s)	Length
1.	"Live in Life" (Alice Ivy remix)	Baldwin; E. Margin; I. Margin; S. Margin; Zeglis	The Rubens; Kersting; Annika Schmarsel	4:23
2.	"Live in Life" (Nasaya remix)	Baldwin; E. Margin; I. Margin; S. Margin; Zeglis	The Rubens; Kersting; Nasaya	3:24
3.	"Live in Life" (Pink Skies remix)	Baldwin; E. Margin; I. Margin; S. Margin; Zeglis	The Rubens; Kersting; Pink Skies	3:37
4.	"Live in Life" (Father Bobby Townsend remix)	Baldwin; E. Margin; I. Margin; S. Margin; Zeglis	The Rubens; Kersting; Father Bobby Townsend	4:03
5.	"Live in Life"	Baldwin; E. Margin; I. Margin; S. Margin; Zeglis	The Rubens; Kersting	3:36
Total length:				19:03

== Charts ==
=== Weekly charts ===
Chart (2020)	Peak position
Australia (ARIA)	21

=== Year-end charts ===
Chart (2020)	Position
Australia (ARIA)	34

== Certifications ==
Region	Certification	Certified units/sales
Australia (ARIA)	3× Platinum	210,000^{‡}
New Zealand (RMNZ)	Gold	15,000^{‡}
^{‡} Sales+streaming figures based on certification alone.
