= The Rubens =

Australian alternative rock band

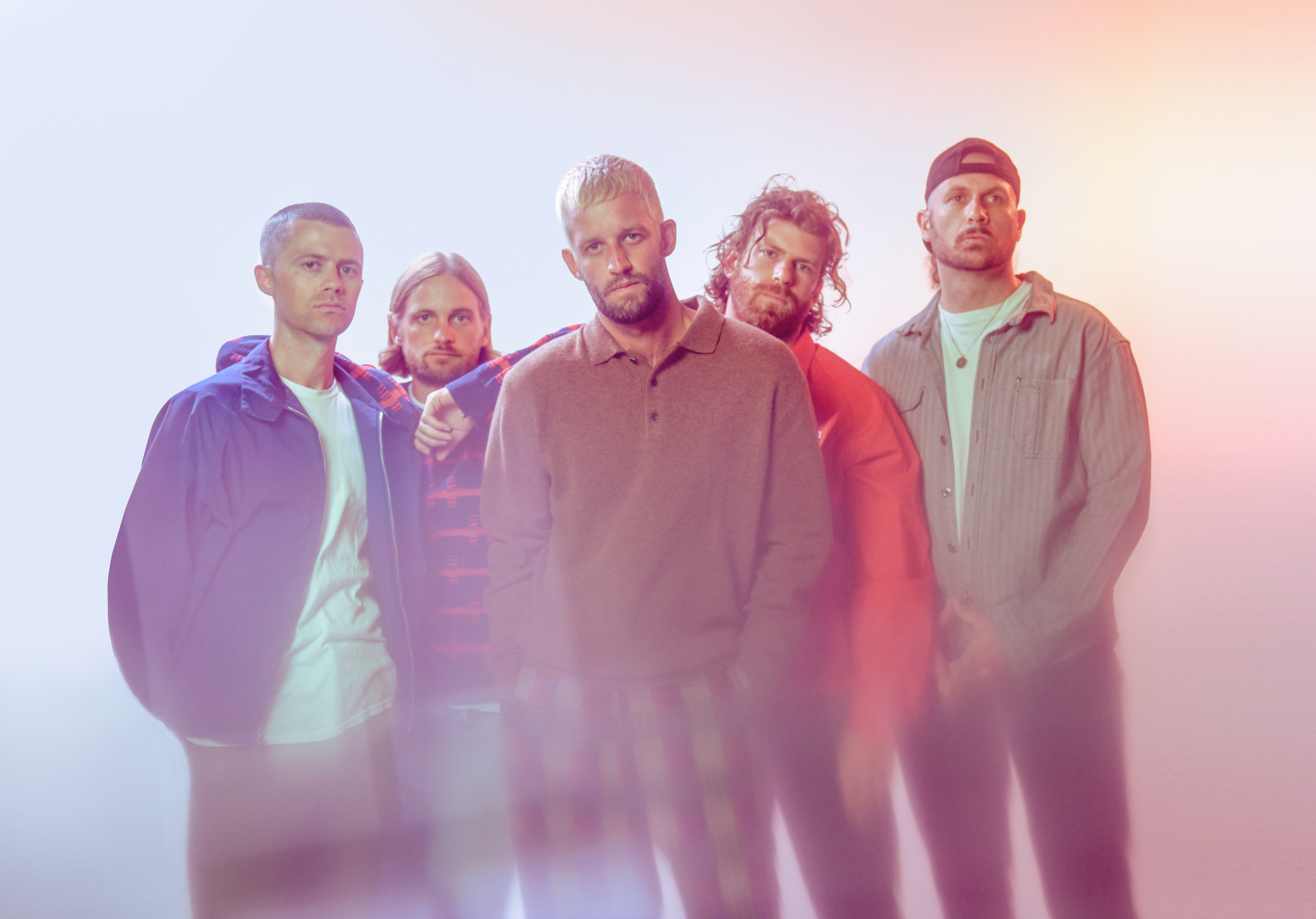

Background information
- Origin: Menangle, New South Wales, Australia
- Genre: Alternative rock
- Years active: 2011–present
- Labels: Ivy League, Humming Records
- Members: Sam Margin; Elliott Margin; Izaac Margin; Scott Baldwin; William Zeglis
- Website: www.therubensmusic.com

The Rubens are an Australian alternative rock band from Menangle, New South Wales. The band comprises the three Margin brothers, Izaac, Sam and Elliott, Scott Baldwin and William Zeglis. Their debut self-titled album The Rubens gained them domestic success with it reaching number 3 on the ARIA Charts and being nominated for a J Award for Album of the Year.

== Band members ==
- Sammuel Margin – lead vocals, guitar
- Scott Baldwin – drums
- Elliott Margin – keyboards, backing vocals
- Izaac Margin – lead guitar
- William Zeglis – bass guitar

== Career ==
In 2011, the recently formed group uploaded a demo of the song "Lay It Down" onto Triple J Unearthed. The song was voted number 57 on the Triple J Hottest 100, 2011 and lead to the group signing a contract with Ivy League Recordss in early 2012.

Their August 2012 single, "My Gun", was nominated for Best Music Video at the 2012 ARIA Awards and was voted number 10 on the Triple J Hottest 100 of 2012.

In May 2015, the band released the lead single from their second album, called "Hallelujah". The album, Hoops, was released in August 2015. The follow-up single from the album, the title track "Hoops", reached number 25 on the ARIA Singles Chart in 2015. It was also voted number 1 in the Triple J Hottest 100 of 2015, held on Australia Day 2016 (26 January). After its success on the Hottest 100, the single re-entered the charts, reaching a new peak of number 9 on the ARIA Singles Chart in February 2016.

In June 2018, the band released their third studio album, Lo La Ru, which became their third to debut within the ARIA top 5. In the same year, the band supported Pink in her 46-show tour of Australia.

In February 2021, the band released their fourth studio album, 0202. It debuted at number 1 on the ARIA Albums Chart, becoming the band's first album to do so.

The band's fifth studio album Soda was released on 20 September 2024.

In August 2026, the group announced their sixth studio album Group Therapy would be released in October 2026. It will be supported with an Australian tour from October through December 2026.

== Discography ==
=== Studio albums ===
List of studio albums, with release date, label, selected chart positions, and certifications shown
Title	Details	Peak chart positions	Certifications
Title	Details	AUS	Certifications
The Rubens	Released: 25 September 2012; Label: Ivy League; Format: CD, digital download	3	ARIA: Platinum
Hoops	Released: 7 August 2015; Label: Ivy League; Format: CD, LP, digital download, streaming	2	ARIA: Gold
Lo La Ru	Released: 29 June 2018; Label: Ivy League; Format: CD, LP, digital download, streaming	3	
0202	Released: 12 February 2021; Label: Ivy League; Format: CD, LP, digital download, streaming	1	
Soda	Released: 20 September 2024; Label: Ivy League; Format: CD, LP, digital download, streaming	4	
Group Therapy	Released: 16 October 2026; Label: The Rubens; Format: CD, CS, LP, digital download, streaming	6	

=== Live albums ===
List of live albums, with release date and label shown
Title	Details
MTV Unplugged	Released: 10 May 2019; Label: Ivy League; Format: CD / DVD, digital download, streaming

=== Extended plays ===
List of EPs, with release date and label shown
Title	EP details
Hoops Acoustic	Released: 4 November 2016; Label: Ivy League; Format: Digital download, streaming; Note: features acoustic versions of "Hoops", "My Gun", "Trickle Down Effect" and "Lay it Down" and non-album track "Same Drugs"

=== Singles ===
List of singles, with year released, selected chart positions and certifications, and album name shown
Title	Year	Peak chart positions	Certifications	Album
Title	Year	AUS	Certifications	Album
"Lay It Down"	2011	—	ARIA: Gold	Non-album single (Note: "Lay It Down" was released as a radio single via Triple J Unearthed in 2011. It was later re-recorded for The Rubens)
"Don't Ever Want to Be Found"	2012	—		The Rubens
"My Gun"	2012	56	ARIA: Platinum	The Rubens
"The Best We Got"	2012	—		The Rubens
"Never Be the Same"	2013	—		The Rubens
"Hallelujah"	2015	—		Hoops
"Hoops"	2015	9	ARIA: 3× Platinum; RMNZ: Gold	Hoops
"Hold Me Back"	2016	91		Hoops
"Million Man"	2017	—	ARIA: Gold	Lo La Ru
"Never Ever" (featuring Sarah)	2018	21	ARIA: 3× Platinum; RMNZ: Gold	Lo La Ru
"God Forgot"	2018	—	ARIA: Gold	Lo La Ru
"Falling Asleep at the Wheel" (with Vic Mensa)	2019	—		Non-album single
"Live in Life"	2019	21	ARIA: 3× Platinum; RMNZ: Gold	0202
"Heavy Weather"	2020	—		0202
"Time of My Life"	2020	—		0202
"Masterpiece"	2020	91	ARIA: Gold	0202
"Muddy Evil Pain"	2021	—		0202
"Waste a Day"	2021	—		Non-album single
"Pets and Drugs"	2023	—		Soda
"One Step Ahead"	2023	—		Mushroom: Fifty Years of Making Noise (Reimagined)
"Good Mood"	2023	—		Soda
"Liquid Gold"	2024	—		Soda
"Black Balloon"	2024	—		Soda
"Soda"	2024	—		Soda
"Sunday Night"	2024	—		Soda
"Goanna"	2026	—		Group Therapy
"Are You Getting High"	2026	—		Group Therapy
"Love Me America"	2026	—		Group Therapy
"No Champagne"	2026	—		Group Therapy
"Cannonball"	2026	—		Group Therapy

=== Promotional singles ===
List of promotional singles, with year released and album shown
Title	Year	Album
"Casper"	2018	Lo La Ru
"Fade into You" (Like a Version)	2024	Non-album single

=== Other charted songs ===
List of other charted songs, with year released, selected chart positions, and album name shown
Title	Year	Peak chart positions	Album
Title	Year	NZ Hot	Album
"Thank You"	2021	29	0202

== Awards and nominations ==
=== AIR Awards ===
The Australian Independent Record Awards (colloquially known as the AIR Awards) is an annual awards night to recognise, promote and celebrate the success of Australia's Independent Music sector.

Year	Nominee / work	Award	Result	Ref.
2012	Themselves	Breakthrough Independent Artist of the Year	Nominated	
2013	Themselves	Breakthrough Independent Artist of the Year	Nominated	
2022	0202	Best Independent Pop Album or EP	Nominated	

=== ARIA Music Awards ===
The ARIA Music Awards is an annual awards ceremony that recognises excellence, innovation, and achievement across all genres of Australian music. The Rubens have been nominated for four awards.

Year	Nominee / work	Award	Result	Ref.
2012	"My Gun" (directed by Josh Logue)	Best Video	Nominated	
2013	The Rubens	Breakthrough Artist – Release	Nominated	
2013	The Rubens	Best Rock Album	Nominated	
2020	"Live in Life"	Song of the Year	Nominated	
2021	Konstantin Kersting for The Rubens – 0202 and "Masterpiece"	Producer of the Year	Won	
2021	Konstantin Kersting for The Rubens – 0202 and "Masterpiece"	Engineer of the Year	Won	
2021	Eric J Dubowsky for The Rubens – 0202	Engineer of the Year	Nominated	

=== APRA Awards ===
The APRA Awards are held in Australia and New Zealand by the Australasian Performing Right Association to recognise songwriting skills, sales and airplay performance by its members annually. The Rubens have won two awards.

Year	Nominee / work	Award	Result	Ref.
2013	"My Gun"	Rock Work of the Year	Won	
2013	"My Gun"	Song of the Year	Shortlisted	
2016	"Hoops"	Rock Work of the Year	Nominated	
2017	"Hold Me Back"	Rock Work of the Year	Nominated	
2019	"Never Ever" (with Sarah Aarons)	Rock Work of the Year	Won	
2019	"Million Man"	Rock Work of the Year	Nominated	
2020	"God Forgot"	Most Performed Alternate Work of the Year	Nominated	
2021	"Live in Life"	Most Performed Alternative Work	Won	
2021	"Live in Life"	Most Performed Australian Work	Nominated	
2022	"Masterpiece"	Most Performed Alternative Work	Nominated	
2025	"Good Mood"	Most Performed Alternative Work	Nominated	

=== J Awards ===
The J Awards are an annual series of Australian music awards that were established by the Australian Broadcasting Corporation's youth-focused radio station Triple J.

Year	Nominee / work	Award	Result	Ref.
2012	The Rubens	Album of the Year	Nominated	
2012	Themselves	Unearthed Artist of the Year	Won	
2015	Hoops	Album of the Year	Nominated	

=== MTV Europe Music Awards ===
The MTV Europe Music Awards are a series of awards presented by Viacom International Media Networks to honour artists and music in pop culture.

Year	Nominee / work	Award	Result	Ref.
2018	Themselves	Best Australian Act	Nominated	
