= Group Therapy (The Rubens album) =

Studio album by the Rubens
- Released: 16 October 2026
- Studio: Camden studio
- Length: 34:55
- Producers: Konstantin Kersting; The Rubens

The Rubens chronology
Soda (2024)	Group Therapy (2026)

Singles from Group Therapy
- 1. "Goanna" Released: 27 March 2026; 2. "Are You Getting High" Released: 29 May 2026; 3. "Love Me America" Released: 14 August 2026; 4. "No Champagne" Released: 18 September 2026; 5. "The Cannonball" Released: 16 October 2026

Group Therapy is the sixth studio album by the Australian alternative rock group the Rubens. The album was announced in August 2026, alongside its third single "Love Me America". The album was released on 16 October 2026.

The album will be supported with an initial 14-date tour October through December 2026, with an additional 10 dates added in September 2026 for January and February 2027.

Upon release, singer and guitarist Sam Margin calls it his "first sober album", stating he'd hit "a low point" after a self-described "booze-related breakdown" and where making music lost its meaning. He went to therapy to get help, which inspired the album's title.

== Track listing ==
All music is composed by Scott Baldwin, Elliott Margin, Izaac Margin, Samuel Margin, and William Zeglis.

Group Therapy track listing
No.	Title	Lyrics	Length
1.	"Love Me America"	Samuel Margin	4:02
2.	"Are You Getting High"	Elliott Margin	3:40
3.	"Hotel Hotel"	E. Margin	2:33
4.	"Every Piece of Me"	E. Margin	3:23
5.	"Close Ups"	S. Margin	2:51
6.	"Goanna"	E. Margin	3:00
7.	"Bright Light"	E. Margin	2:07
8.	"No Champagne"	E. Margin	3:43
9.	"The Cannonball"	E. Margin	3:30
10.	"Run Son"	S. Margin	3:27
11.	"Oh Saturday"	E. Margin	2:39
Total length:			34:55

== Personnel ==
Credits are adapted from Tidal.

=== The Rubens ===
- Scott Baldwin – drums, production
- Elliott Margin – keyboards, synthesizer, production
- Izaac Margin – electric guitar, production
- Samuel Margin – acoustic guitar, production
- William Zeglis – 5-string bass guitar, production

=== Additional contributors ===
- Konstantin Kersting – production, mixing
- Andrew Downton – mastering

== Charts ==
Chart performance for Group Therapy
Chart (2026)	Peak position
Australian Albums (ARIA)	6
