= J Awards of 2012 =

Annual Australian music awards

- Date: 23 November 2012
- Venue: Australia
- Website: abc.net.au/triplej

The J Award of 2012 is the eighth annual J Awards, established by the Australian Broadcasting Corporation's youth-focused radio station Triple J. The announcement comes at the culmination of Ausmusic Month (November). For the fifth year, three awards were presented; Australian Album of the Year, Australian Music Video of the Year and Unearthed Artist of the Year. Winners were announced on 23 November 2012.

== Who's eligible? ==
Any Australian album released independently or through a record company, or sent to Triple J in consideration for airplay, is eligible for the J Award. The 2012 nominations for Australian Album of the Year and Australian Music Video of the Year were selected from releases received by Triple J between November 2011 and October 2012. For Unearthed Artist of the Year it was open to any artist from the Unearthed (talent contest), who has had a ground breaking and impactful 12 months from November 2011 and October 2012.

== Awards ==
=== Australian Album of the Year ===
Artist	Album Title	Result
Tame Impala	Lonerism	Won
Alpine	A Is for Alpine	Nominated
Hermitude	HyperParadise	Nominated
Ball Park Music	Museum	Nominated
The Rubens	The Rubens	Nominated
Bertie Blackman	Pope Innocent X	Nominated
Regular John	Strange Flowers	Nominated
Oh Mercy	Deep Heat	Nominated
Urthboy	Smokey's Haunt	Nominated
The Presets	Pacifica	Nominated
Sarah Blasko	I Awake	Nominated
Parkway Drive	Atlas	Nominated

- This was the second time Tame Impala have won this award; the first coming at the J Awards of 2010 with Innerspeaker.

=== Australian Video of the Year ===
Director	Artist and Song	Result
Kris Moyes	Kirin J. Callinan - "Way II War"	Won
Luci Schroder	Alpine - "Hands"	Nominated
Darcy Prendergast	Gotye - "Easy Way Out"	Nominated
Dimitri Basil	Flight Facilities - "Foreign Language"	Nominated
Quan Yeomans	Bertie Blackman - "Boy"	Nominated
Selina Miles	Hilltop Hoods - "Rattling the Keys to the Kingdom"	Nominated

=== Unearthed Artist of the Year ===
Artist	Result
The Rubens	Won
Flume	Nominated
Chance Waters	Nominated
Kingswood	Nominated
Thelma Plum	Nominated
