= Dumb Days =

Studio album by Tired Lion
- Released: 15 September 2017
- Recorded: Perth, Australia
- Genre: Grunge, alternative rock
- Length: 34:17
- Label: Dew Process, Universal Music Australia
- Producer: Luke Boerdam

Tired Lion chronology
Figurine (2015)	Dumb Days (2017)

Singles from Dumb Days
- 1. "Cinderella Dracula" Released: 29 March 2017; 2. "Fresh" Released: 3 August 2017; 3. "Dumb Days" Released: 21 November 2017; 4. "Where Were You?" Released: 10 May 2018

Professional ratings
Review scores
Source	Rating
Rolling Stone	4/5 stars

Dumb Days is the debut studio album by Australian alternative rock band Tired Lion It was released through Dew Process and the Universal Music Group in September 2017. The album was produced by Violent Soho frontman Luke Boerdam. Australian radio station Triple J picked Dumb Days as their feature album of the week in September 2017. While the band didn't chart in the Hottest 100 of 2017, the first three singles charted in the Hottest 200 with Dumb Days, Fresh and Cinderella Dracula coming in at #185, #179 and #150 respectively.

== Track listing ==
All lyrics are written by Sophie Hopes; all music is composed by Tired Lion (Sophie Hopes, Matt Tanner, Nick Vasey and Ethan Darnell).

No.	Title	Length
1.	"Japan"	3:23
2.	"Where Were You?"	2:31
3.	"Cinderella Dracula"	2:49
4.	"Camp"	2:49
5.	"Fresh"	4:11
6.	"Dumb Days"	3:31
7.	"Hawaiifive0"	2:55
8.	"Behave"	2:36
9.	"Cilantro"	3:10
10.	"I've Been Trying" (song ends at 3:44; includes hidden track "Med/Moy" from 4:13)	6:22
Total length:		34:17

=== iTunes/Google Play/Spotify Edition ===
No.	Title	Length
10.	"I've Been Trying"	3:44
11.	"Med/Moy"	2:09
Total length:		33:48

== Personnel ==
Credits adapted from the album's liner notes.

Tired Lion

- Sophie Hopes – vocals, guitar
- Matt Tanner – guitar
- Nick Vasey – bass
- Ethan Darnell – drums

Additional performers

- Troy Stockley – backing vocals (3)
- Dave Parkin – acoustic guitar (7), synth (9)

== Charts ==
Chart (2017)	Peak position
Australian Albums (ARIA)	21
