= Heavy Weather (song) =

2020 song by The Rubens

Single by The Rubens

from the album 0202
- Released: 21 April 2020
- Length: 3:26
- Label: Ivy League
- Songwriter(s): Scott Baldwin; Elliott Margin; Izaac Margin; Sam Margin; William Zeglis
- Producer(s): The Rubens

The Rubens singles chronology
"Live in Life" (2019)	"Heavy Weather" (2020)	"Time of my Life" (2020)

Music video
- "Heavy Weather" on YouTube

"Heavy Weather" is a song by Australian alternative rock group The Rubens. The song was released on 21 April 2020. The song was released as the second single from the group's fourth studio album, 0202 (2021).

== Background ==
The Rubens' keyboardist Elliott Margin, who also wrote the lyrics, explained the meaning of the song during its premiere on Triple J. "Its about going through something difficult [and] telling yourself those clichéd things - 'chin up', 'pick yourself up' - to get through and realising they're cliches because they work... You are able to get out the other side and feel positive about it eventually." He added that the band wrote the song "ages ago, so it's not about what's going on right now but the timing is pretty perfect," referring to the COVID-19 pandemic, which occurred prior to the song's release.

== Music video ==
Due to the social distancing policies enforced by Australia during the COVID-19 pandemic, The Rubens were unable to film their planned video for “Heavy Weather”, and therefore reached out to their fans via social media asking them to send in a short video of how they are spending the isolation period, to be included in a music video to be released in May.

On 9 June 2020, the music video was released, featuring a montage of the videos which the band requested that their fans send in, and The Rubens green-screened overlaying them.
