= J Awards =

Australian music awards

- Current: 2025 J Awards
- The J Award logo. (2005)
- Country: Australia
- Presented by: Triple J
- First award: 2005
- Website: 2024 winners

Television/radio coverage
- Network: Triple J (2005–present)

The J Awards are an annual series of Australian music awards, established by the Australian Broadcasting Corporation's youth-focused radio station Triple J, and which also extend to sister stations, Triple J Unearthed and Double J. The awards are presented through on-air ceremony held in November each year as part of Triple J's Ausmusic Month.

== Background and awards ==
As part of Triple J's 30th anniversary celebrations in 2005, the station inaugurated a single "J Award" to be given for "an album of outstanding achievement as an Australian musical work of art – for its creativity, innovation, musicianship and contribution to Australian music."

=== Australian Album of the Year ===
As per the official rules and criteria, the award is open to any album by an Australian artist that is released either independently or through a record company between November of the previous year and October of the current year. Any album sent into Triple J in consideration for airplay is also eligible for the J Award, given its received by Triple J within this period. This award was renamed as the Australian Album of the Year in 2007.

=== Unearthed Artist of the Year ===
In 2007, a new award for Unearthed Artist of the Year was introduced. The Triple J judges now looking back over the winners of site competitions over the year and awarding the Triple J Unearthed J Award to the best and most promising artist. The Judging criteria for the Unearthed Artist of the Year is open to any artist who has had a ground breaking and impactful last 12 months. Any Unearthed artist who wins a sponsored competition or is featured on Unearthed is eligible for this award. Any artist registered on the Unearthed site during this period is also eligible in consideration for nomination for this award.

=== Australian Music Video of the Year ===
In 2008, a new award for Australian Music Video of the Year was added. originally with Triple j TV as a co-presenter but that role is now filled by ABC TV program Rage. The music video of the year being determined for its outstanding achievement as an Australian musical video work of art (based on its creativity, originality and technical excellence). The music video is selected from any music video released by an Australian artist (either independently or through a record company) and that is also directed by and Australian director between November and December the preceding year.

=== Double J Australian Artist of the Year ===
In 2014, a new award for Double J Australian Artist of the Year was introduced. It was awarded by Double J, Triple J's sister station, to the artist that the station had seen as the greatest contributor to either recorded music, live performances or Australian music culture, or a combination of the three, during the course of the year.

This award celebrates artists who have released or produced an album that has resonated with Double J as an impressive musical work of art; have pulled off significant live performances, events or tours; or made a valued contribution through their music to Australian arts and culture.

=== You Done Good Award ===
In 2019, a fifth award for You Done Good Award was added to the schedule. The award goes to an Australian who has "made an impact on the industry through outstanding achievement, social change or altruistic endeavours." It has not been awarded since 2022.

=== Australian Live Act of the Year ===
In 2023, the Australian Live Act of the Year was introduced.

== The J Award trophy ==
The current J Award trophy is a 3D design that features the top third of the J Award logo, the emu and kangaroo crossed necks and heads and is made of glass and has the categories and winners inscribed onto them. It has remained largely unchanged since its inception in 2008.

== Awards by year ==
To see the full article for a particular year, please click on the year link.

Year	Australian Album of the Year	Unearthed Artist of the Year	Australian Music Video of the Year (Director, Song, Artist)	Double J Australian Artist of the Year	Australian Live Act of the Year
2005	Wolfmother by Wolfmother	—N/a	—N/a	—N/a	—N/a
2006	The Hard Road by Hilltop Hoods	—N/a	—N/a	—N/a	—N/a
2007	Cruel Guards by The Panics	Young and Restless	—N/a	—N/a	—N/a
2008	Apocalypso by The Presets	John Steel Singers	Mike Daly for "2020" by The Herd	—N/a	—N/a
2009	As Day Follows Night by Sarah Blasko	The Middle East	Alex Roberts for "Parlez Vous Francais?" by Art vs. Science	—N/a	—N/a
2010	Innerspeaker by Tame Impala	Boy & Bear	Mairi Cameron and Stephen Lance for "Sunday Best by Washington	—N/a	—N/a
2011	Making Mirrors by Gotye	Ball Park Music	Emma Tomelty for "Speak of the Devil" by Hermitude	—N/a	—N/a
2012	Lonerism by Tame Impala	The Rubens	Kris Moyes for "Way II War" by Kirin J. Callinan	—N/a	—N/a
2013	Flume by Flume	Remi	Josh Thomas for "Everything You Wanted" by Clubfeet	—N/a	—N/a
2014	Built on Glass by Chet Faker	Meg Mac	Sia Furler and Daniel Askill for "Chandelier" by Sia	Mia Dyson	—N/a
2015	Sometimes I Sit and Think, and Sometimes I Just Sit by Courtney Barnett	Tired Lion	Natalie Erika James for "Mine" by Life Is Better Blonde	Tim Rogers	—N/a
2016	Utopia Defeated by D.D Dumbo	Tash Sultana	Danny Cohen and Jason Galea for "People-Vultures" by King Gizzard & the Lizard Wizard	King Gizzard & the Lizard Wizard	—N/a
2017	Reclaim Australia by A.B. Original	Stella Donnelly	Tim White for "A Foreign Affair" by Client Liaison/Tina Arena	Jen Cloher	—N/a
2018	Lost Friends by Middle Kids	Kwame	Claudia Sangiorgi Dalimore for "Native Tongue" by Mojo Juju	Geoffrey Gurrumul Yunupingu	—N/a
2019	Rainbow Valley by Matt Corby	Tones and I	Sanjay De Silva for "Final Form" by Sampa The Great	Sampa the Great	—N/a
2020	14 Steps to a Better You by Lime Cordiale	JK-47	Joey Hunter for "Billy Bad Again" by Tasman Keith	Archie Roach	—N/a
2021	Smiling with No Teeth by Genesis Owusu	King Stingray	Riley Blakeway for "The Other Black Dog" by Genesis Owusu	The Avalanches	—N/a
2022	Angel in Realtime by Gang of Youths	Elsy Wameyo	Raghav Rampal for "Oldboy" by 1300	Midnight Oil	—N/a
2023	Drummer by G Flip	Miss Kaninna	Moonboy Studios for "4K to the Middle East" by Shaba featuring Uzi	Briggs	Genesis Owusu
2024	Zorb by Sycco	Lithe	Claudia Sangiorgi Dalimore for "Lordy Lordy" by Emily Wurramara featuring Tasman Keith	Missy Higgins	Angie McMahon
2025	I Love My Computer by Ninajirachi	Folk Bitch Trio	Ball Bass John for "Fuck My Computer" by Ninajirachi	Amyl and the Sniffers	Speed
2026	Redstar Wu & the Worldwide Scourge by Genesis Owusu	Swapmeet	Isaac Brown for "Stampede" by Genesis Owusu	Vika and Linda	Ninajirachi

== Most awards ==
The following artists have won more than one J Award:

- Five awards
  - Genesis Owusu, Australian Album of the Year in 2021 and 2026; Australian Music Video of the Year in 2021 and 2026; and Australian Live Act of the Year in 2023.
- Three awards
  - Ninajirachi, Australian Album of the Year and Australian Music Video of the Year in 2025; and Australian Live Act of the Year in 2026.
- Two awards
  - Tame Impala, Australian Album of the Year in 2010 and 2012.
  - King Gizzard and the Lizard Wizard, Double J Artist of the Year and Australian Music Video of the Year in 2016.
  - Sampa the Great, Double J Artist of the Year and Australian Music Video of the Year in 2026.
