= Never Ever (The Rubens song) =

Single by The Rubens featuring Sarah

from the album Lo La Ru
- Released: 13 April 2018
- Length: 3:19
- Label: Ivy League
- Composers: Sarah Aarons, Elliott Margin, Sam Margin
- Producer: Eric J

The Rubens singles chronology
"Million Man" (2017)	"Never Ever" (2018)	"God Forgot" (2018)

Music video
- "Never Ever" on YouTube

"Never Ever" is a song by Australian alternative rock group The Rubens featuring Sarah. The song was released on 13 April 2018 as the second single from the group's third studio album, Lo La Ru.

== Background and release ==
The Rubens received an email from Sarah Aarons who advised she was going to be in Sydney, was a fan of theirs and was keen to write a song with them. At that time, the group were putting the finishing touches on the album that would become Lo La Ru.

The Rubens keyboardist Elliott Margin said "The day we met Sarah in the studio, she told us that her year 10 teacher introduced her to our song "Lay It Down" and that is what inspired her to do music in year 11 and 12". Margin said the song wasn't meant to be on the album saying "We actually thought with the album completed we would be writing a song for someone else. The main chord structure and melody was something I had been fiddling with for a while but couldn't find the words or story for. After meeting Sarah and having a chat we got stuck into the song... Pretty quickly we realised it needed to be a duet and from there the story started to take shape."

The song is a tale of heartbreak that begins as a stripped back piano ballad but builds into a back-and-forth of blame shifting of a relationship in decay, voiced in a duet between Sam Margin and Sarah Aarons.

At the APRA Music Awards of 2019, the song won Rock Work of the Year.

== Music video ==
The music video was directed by Anna Phillips and released on 11 May 2018.

== Reception ==
A staff writer from The Music described the song as "smooth as silk" adding "the collaboration between the Menangle band and Aarons came together as if it was meant to be."

== Charts ==
Chart (2018)	Peak position
Australia (ARIA)	21

== Certifications ==
Region	Certification	Certified units/sales
Australia (ARIA)	3× Platinum	210,000^{‡}
New Zealand (RMNZ)	Gold	15,000^{‡}
^{‡} Sales+streaming figures based on certification alone.
