= Utopia Defeated =

2016 D.D Dumbo album

Utopia Defeated is the first album from the Australian, Castlemaine-based musician D.D Dumbo, released on 6 October 2016 by Liberation Music in Australia and New Zealand and by 4AD in the rest of the world.

At the J Awards of 2016, the album won the Australian Album of the Year.

== Reception ==
Critical reception for Utopia Defeated has been uniformly positive, with the album receiving an 80% score on Metacritic, based on eight reviews, indicating 'generally favourable reviews'. Sarah Smith for Rolling Stone Australia wrote that D.D Dumbo "conjures fantastical visions singing of squidling, spilt blood and the sea on his exceptional debut" and Shaad D'Souza for Faster Louder said, "If there’s one thing we learn through the course of the album, it’s that D.D Dumbo’s beautiful, fractal arrangements can make even the most hellish scenario sound utopian." Timothy Monger for AllMusic wrote that "Perry introduces a unique vision and his impressive debut is well worth the time it takes to let it decant."

== Track listing ==
No.	Title	Length
1.	"Walrus"	3:11
2.	"Satan"	4:36
3.	"In The Water"	2:56
4.	"Cortisol"	4:14
5.	"Alihukwe"	3:58
6.	"King Franco Picasso"	3:36
7.	"The Day I First Found God"	3:34
8.	"Toxic City"	3:18
9.	"Brother"	3:42
10.	"Oyster"	4:06
