= God Forgot =

Single by The Rubens

from the album Lo La Ru
- Released: 4 October 2018
- Length: 3:02
- Label: Ivy League
- Composer(s): Scott Baldwin, Elliott Margin, Sam Margin, Zaac Margin, William Zeglis

The Rubens singles chronology
"Never Ever" (2018)	"God Forgot" (2018)	"Falling Asleep at the Wheel" (2019)

Music video
- "God Forgot" on YouTube

"God Forgot" is a song by Australian alternative rock group The Rubens. The song was released on 4 October 2018 as the third and final single from the group's third studio album, Lo La Ru. The song was certified gold in Australia in 2020.

At the APRA Music Awards of 2020, the song was nominated for Most Performed Alternate Work of the Year.

== Reception ==
In an album review Meg Price from Amnplify said the song "is the peppy, pick-me-up dance number". Josh Leeson from The Herald said "God Forgot" is "the album highlight".

== Certifications ==
Region	Certification	Certified units/sales
Australia (ARIA)	Gold	35,000^{‡}
^{‡} Sales+streaming figures based on certification alone.
