= Lay It Down (The Rubens song) =

Single by The Rubens
- Released: 2011
- Length: 3:50
- Label: The Rubens
- Composer: The Rubens
- Producer: The Rubens

The Rubens singles chronology
"Lay It Down" (2011)	"Don't Ever Want to Be Found" (2012)

"Lay It Down" is a song by Australian alternative rock group The Rubens. A demo of the song was uploaded onto Triple J Unearthed in 2011, shortly after the form had formed. The song was voted number 57 in the Triple J Hottest 100, 2011 and led the group to sign with Ivy League Records in early 2012.

At the J Awards of 2012, the group won Unearthed Artist of the Year.

The song was re-recorded for their debut self-titled album (2012) and a music video was released in February 2013 featuring Abbie Cornish.

The song was certified gold in Australia in 2020.

== Reception ==
Scribbled Tonality said "'Lay it Down' uses shaking organ chords, sharp tremolo-induced guitar notes and hip-hop influenced drums to lay a soul-drenched support for Sam Margin to set his voice loose upon."

Hugh McClure from Indie Shuffle said in April 2012 "'Lay it Down' is one of the smoothest tracks I've ever heard, perhaps taking influence from another era. From the crooning vocals to the bluesy guitar and laid-back percussion, this song has struck a chord locally and will no doubt prove just as popular to the wider audience. Emotively touching, this track has fantastic longevity as exhibited by me still listening to it after almost 6 months since its release."

== Certifications ==
Region	Certification	Certified units/sales
Australia (ARIA)	Gold	35,000^{‡}
^{‡} Sales+streaming figures based on certification alone.
