= My Gun =

Single by The Rubens

from the album The Rubens
- Released: 4 August 2012
- Length: 3:10
- Label: Ivy League
- Songwriters: David Kahne and The Rubens
- Producer: David Kahne

The Rubens singles chronology
"Don't Ever Want to Be Found" (2012)	"My Gun" (2012)	"The Best we Got" (2012)

Music video
- "My Gun" on YouTube

"My Gun" is a song recorded by Australian alternative rock group the Rubens. It was released on 4 August 2012 as the second single from their debut album, The Rubens.

The track won Rock Work of the Year at the 2013 APRA Music Awards as well as being nominated for Best Video at the ARIA Music Awards of 2012, but lost out to "Everyone's Waiting" by Missy Higgins.

The track was voted in at number 10 on Triple J's Hottest 100 of 2012.

== Music video ==
The music video was directed by Josh Logue and released on 12 August 2012.

== Track listing ==
One-track single

1. My Gun" – 3:10

US four-track single

1. "My Gun" – 3:10
2. "Lay It Down" – 3:51
3. "Don't Ever Want to Be Found" – 3:19
4. "The Best We Got" – 3:55

== Charts ==
=== Weekly charts ===
Chart (2012)	Peak position
Australia (ARIA)	56

=== Year-end charts ===
Chart (2012)	Rank
Australian Artist Albums Chart	41

== Certification ==
Region	Certification	Certified units/sales
Australia (ARIA)	Platinum	70,000^{‡}
^{‡} Sales+streaming figures based on certification alone.
