= Hoops (The Rubens song) =

Single by the Rubens

from the album Hoops
- Released: 24 July 2015
- Genre: Alternative rock
- Length: 2:38
- Label: Ivy League Records
- Songwriters: Scott Baldwin, Elliott Margin, Izaac Margin, Sam Margin and William Zeglis
- Producer: Eric J Dubowsky

The Rubens singles chronology
"Hallelujah" (2015)	"Hoops" (2015)	"Hold Me Back" (2016)

Music video
- "Hoops" on YouTube

"Hoops" is a song by Australian alternative rock band the Rubens. It was the second single released from their second studio album, Hoops.

The track was voted in at number 1 on the Triple J Hottest 100, 2015.

Band member Sam Margin said, "'Hoops' came as we were getting mixes on what we thought was the finished album. We kept writing just for something to keep us occupied, but when this one came up we felt it had to be on the album. It's about being in a relationship with someone who does damaging things to keep you close, when really their actions are pointless because you love them despite it all."

== Music video ==
The music video was released on 11 August 2015.

== Charts ==
=== Weekly charts ===
"Hoops" entered the Australian charts at number 48 in August 2015 and peaked at number 9 in February 2016.

Chart (2016)	Peak position
Australia (ARIA)	9

=== Year-end charts ===
Chart (2015)	Position
Australian Artist Singles (ARIA)	21

== Certifications ==
Region	Certification	Certified units/sales
Australia (ARIA)	3× Platinum	210,000^{‡}
New Zealand (RMNZ)	Gold	15,000^{‡}
^{‡} Sales+streaming figures based on certification alone.
