= Australian Dance Music Awards =

Australian awards show for Dance Music

The Australian Dance Music Awards (DMA) ran between 2000 and 2006 by the publishers of Australian street press publication 3D World.

== History ==
3DWorld Publishing founded the Australian Dance Music Awards (DMA) to recognise achievements by musicians in dance music as well as hip-hop, which was then considered underground.

Nominees in each category were selected by a panel from the music industry, and then voted on by the general public to determine the winners. Awards ceremonies featured DJ set performances from various artists, such as DJ Ajax.

By 2006, it was regarded as "Australia's longest running, biggest and best dance music awards." No award show was held 2004–2005. When they returned in 2006, the awards were called The Allen & Heath Dance Music Awards, and were still sponsored by 3D World.

== Awards ==
=== 2000 Dance Music Awards ===
Only winners are noted

Award	Winner
Outstanding Contribution to Dance	John Ferris
Best Album	"Skin" by Endorphin
Best Club Night	Tweekin' Club 77
Best Dance Compilation	Freaky Loops
Best Dance Website	K-Grind
Best Debut Artist	Madison Avenue
Best DJ	Phil Smart
Best DJ (People's Choice)	Jules Beaumont
Best Event	Vibes on A Summers Day - Sydney
Best Event (People's Choice)	Mobile Home
Best Hip Hop Act	Metabass
Best Independent Label	Creative Vibes
Best Live Act	Sonic Animation
Best Producer	Groove Terminator
Best Radio Show	Groovetrain hosted by Sharif Galal Triple J
Best Single	"Don't Call Me Baby" by Madison Avenue
Best Turntablist	Dexter
Best Video	Sonic Animation

=== 2001 Dance Music Awards ===
Only winners are noted

Award	Winner
Outstanding Contribution to Dance	Stephen Allkins
Best Album	"Since I Left You" by The Avalanches
Best Club Night	Sublime Home: Sydney
Best Dance Compilation	Sound Not Scene - mixed by Phil K
Best Dance Website	inthemix
Best Debut Artist	The Avalanches
Best DJ	Kid Kenobi
Best DJ (People's Choice)	NSW/ACT: Kid Kenobi VIC: Sean Quinn QLD: Jen-E WA: Stephen Mallinder SA: Mobin Master
Best Event (People's Choice)	Vibes on A Summers Day
Best Hip Hop Act	Resin Dogs
Best Independent Label	Vicious Vinyl
Best Live Act	The Avalanches
Best Producer	Paul Mac
Best Radio Show	Kiss FM 'Friday Tapes' with Phil K
Best Single	"Since I Left You" by The Avalanches
Best Turntablist	Dexter
Best Video	"Since I Left You" by The Avalanches

=== 2002 Dance Music Awards ===
Only winners are noted

Award	Winner
Outstanding Contribution to Dance	Paul Mac
Best Album	"Manipulating Agent" by Katalyst
Best Single	"Legacy" by Infusion
Best Compilation	Airheads 'The Droppin Science Experiment'
Best Producer	Katalyst - Ashley Anderson
Best Independent Label	Creative Vibes
Best Radio Show	Groovetrain hosted by Sharif Galal Triple J
Best Remix	Ivan Gough, Luke Chable & Phil K remix - Paul Mac's Sound of Breaking Up
Best Video Clip	"Beautiful" by Disco Montego
Best Debut Artist	1200 Techniques
Best RnB Act	Selwyn
Best DJ National	Kid Kenobi
Best Hip Hop Act	1200 Techniques
Best Turntablist	Dexter
Best DJ (People's Choice)	NSW/ACT:Goodwill VIC:Sean Quinn SA:Reelax QLD:Kazu Kimura WA:Simon Barwood
Best Event (People's Choice)	Two Tribes
Best Club Night (People's Choice)	NSW:Sublime VIC:One Love SA:Chemistry @ Heaven QLD:Saturdays @ Family WA:Saturdays @ Rise
Best International DJ (People's Choice)	Krafty Kutz

=== 2003 Dance Music Awards ===
Only winners are noted

Award	Winner
Outstanding Contribution to Dance	Phil K
Best Album	"Choose One" by 1200 Techniques
Best Single	"Dead Souls" by Infusion
Best Compilation	A Night Out with Vicious Grooves
Best Producer	Infusion
Best Independent Label	Vicious Vinyl
Best Remix	Poxymusic vs Kid Kenobi remix of Green Velvet 'La La Land'
Best Video Clip	"One of my Kind" by Rogue Traders
Best Mix CD	"Balance 004" by Phil K
Best Debut Artist	Downsyde
Best Urban Act	Jeremy Gregory
Best DJ National	Phil K
Best Hip Hop Act	1200 Techniques
Best Turntablist	Dexter
Best Live Act	Resin Dogs
Best State DJ (People's Choice)	NSW/ACT:Kid Kenobi VIC:John Course SA:DJ Brendon QLD:Baby Gee WA:Simon Barwood
Best Event (People's Choice)	Two Tribes
Best Club Night (People's Choice)	NSW:Sublime VIC:Bass Station @ The Palace SA:Clubland @ Heaven QLD:Saturdays @ Family WA:Saturdays @ Rise
Best International DJ (People's Choice)	Adam Feeland

=== 2006 Dance Music Awards ===
==== Best Video Clip ====
Title and/or artist	Result	Ref.
"Going Nowhere" by Cut Copy	Nominated	
"Cause an Effect" by N'Fa	Nominated	
"Blackness of the Sea" by Deepchild	Nominated	
"Are you the one?" by The Presets	Won	

==== Best Urban Act ====
Title and/or artist	Result	Ref.
Guy Sebastian	Nominated	
Jade Macrae	Nominated	
Israel	Nominated	
Kid Confucius	Won	

==== Best Debut Artist ====
Title and/or artist	Result	Ref.
Midnight Juggernauts	Won	
N'Fa	Nominated	
Riot In Belgium	Nominated	
Van She	Nominated	

==== Best Live Act ====
Title and/or artist	Result	Ref.
Cut Copy	Nominated	
Hilltop Hoods	Won	
The Presets	Nominated	
Midnight Juggernauts	Nominated	

==== Best Remix ====
Title and/or artist	Result	Ref.
Hilltop Hoods "The Hard Road" Suffa Remix	Won	
Prodigy "Voodoo People" Pendulum Remix	Nominated	
T Rek "Freakshow Disco #3" Stick Figures Risky Disco Mix	Nominated	
Ignition - "This Love is War" Goodwill Remix	Nominated	

==== Best Compilation ====
Title and/or artist	Result	Ref.
Bondi Calling 3	Nominated	
Future Classics attractions	Nominated	
Modular - Modular presents Leave them all behind	Won	
Balance	Nominated	

==== Best Mix CD ====
Title and/or artist	Result	Ref.
Bang Gang - Mashed 2	Nominated	
John Course & Goodwill - Sessions Three	Nominated	
Mark Walton – Story of Electro	Nominated	
Tiga & Ajax - In the Mix 05	Won	

==== Best Independent Label ====
Title and/or artist	Result	Ref.
Obese	Won	
Elefant Traks	Nominated	
Inertia	Nominated	
Modular	Nominated	

==== Best Hip Hop Act ====
Title and/or artist	Result	Ref.
Hermitude	Nominated	
The Herd	Nominated	
Hilltop Hoods	Won	
Koolism	Nominated	

==== Best Turntablist ====
Title and/or artist	Result	Ref.
Danielsan	Nominated	
Dexter	Won	
J-Red	Nominated	
Samrai	Nominated	

==== Best Producer ====
Title and/or artist	Result	Ref.
Dirty South	Nominated	
Debris	Nominated	
Plutonic Lab	Nominated	
Suffa (Hilltop Hoods)	Won	

==== Best Single ====
Title and/or artist	Result	Ref.
"Its too late" by Dirty South Vs Evermore	Nominated	
"The Hard Road" by Hilltop Hoods	Won	
"Tarantula" by Pendulum	Nominated	
"Are you the one?" by The Presets	Nominated	

==== Best Album ====
Title and/or artist	Result	Ref.
"Beams" by The Presets	Nominated	
"Lifetime" by Deepchild	Nominated	
"Hard Road" by Hilltop Hoods	Won	
"Tales from the drift" by Hermitude	Nominated	

==== Best DJ ====
Title and/or artist	Result	Ref.
Ajax	Won	
John Course	Nominated	
Nick Toth	Nominated	
Regal	Nominated	

==== People's Choice Awards ====
Only winners listed

Award	Title and/or artist	Ref.
Best International DJ	James Zabiela	
Best Event	Big Day Out	
Best Radio Show	FBI Sunsets	
Best Club Night (statewide)	NSW/ACT – Kink VIC – One Love QLD – Saturdays @ Family SA – HQ WA – Saturdays @ The Church	
Best DJ (statewide)	NSW/ACT – Ajax VIC – John Course QLD – Baby Gee SA – Debris WA – Kenny L	

==== Outstanding Contribution to Dance ====
Only winner listed

Title and/or artist	Ref.
John Course	
