= Hau Latukefu =

- Also known as: MC Hau, Hau, Hauie Beast
- Born: Langomi-e-Hau Latukefu; 1976 (age 49–50); Queanbeyan, New South Wales, Australia
- Genres: Hip-hop
- Occupations: Musician, radio host
- Years active: 1992–present
- Member of: Koolism
- Website: hauietv.com

Langomi-e-Hau Latukefu (born 1976), better known as Hau Latukefu, Hauie Beast, MC Hau or simply Hau, is an Australian hip hop musician and radio host. He is best known as half of the duo Koolism (with Danielsan) and as the host of Triple J's hip hop program and Sky High on Double J.

== Career ==
Latukefu, together with his cousins Hounga and Sione, formed a group named Tribe Ledda L, the "L" standing for Latukefu. By 1995, only DJ Danielsan and Hau remained in the group and they changed the name to Koolism, from a song with the same name which they had recorded the previous year.

Koolism has released a total of five albums and five EPs to date. They were nominated at the Australian Dance Music Awards in several categories in 2002 and again in 2003. They won an ARIA Award in 2004 for Best Urban Release for Part Three: Random Thoughts, an album which featured guest appearances by Rodney P (UK), Nfamas (1200 Techniques), and Mnemonic Ascent. Koolism featured in the Australian hip hop documentary Words from the City. Despite the duo leaving Canberra, with Latukefu moving to Sydney and Danielsan to Melbourne, they have continued to work together and released albums New Old Ground (2006) and The 'Umu (2010).

As an individual artist, Latukefu has appeared as a guest on various other tracks, including Hilltop Hoods' "Another Word" (2001) and "The Blue Blooded" (2007), Urthboy's "Nuthin I'd Rather Do" (2007) and Resin Dogs' "For My People" (2013).

On 14 April 2008, Latukefu took over from Maya Jupiter as the host of Triple J's weekly Hip Hop Show.

In late 2011, Latukefu launched Hauie TV, an online series intended to celebrate hip hop culture.

Latukefu played in the Robert Hunter Cup memorial football matches in 2012 and 2013 to commemorate MC Hunter.

Together with Trials (Funkoars), he wrote the song "Yes, He Is", dedicated to Aki.
