= Brain Wash EP =

EP by N'fa
- Released: 2008
- Recorded: 2008
- Genre: Hip hop Australian hip hop
- Length: 0:23
- Label: Rubber Records
- Producer: Various

N'fa chronology
Cause An Effect (2006)	Brain Wash EP (2008)

The Brain Wash EP is the second extended play released, in 2008, by the former 1200 Techniques frontman, N'fa. As implied on the cover of the Brain Wash EP, N'fa introduced the stage name No Fixed Abode beneath the "N'fa" logo. His 1200 Techniques nickname Nfamas has not been used since his guest appearance on Koolism's 2004 album Random Thoughts.

== Track listing ==
1. "Brain Wash" (Instrumental)
2. "The Movement"
3. "Time For"
4. "Streets Need" (feat. Micro Coz)
5. "X-Fire" (feat. Natalie Pa'Apa'a of Blue King Brown)
6. "LefToe" (feat. Famalam)
7. "The Movement" (Instrumental)

== Resources ==
Rave Magazine Australia review
