= The Legacy Continues... (Def Wish Cast album) =

Studio album by Def Wish Cast
- Released: (Australia) 5 August 2006
- Recorded: 2005/2006
- Genre: Hip hop
- Length: 46:49
- Label: Hydrofunk
- Producer: Sereck

Def Wish Cast chronology
Knights of the Underground Table (1992)	The Legacy Continues... (2006)	Evolution Machine (2012)

2007 Vinyl Edition Cover

The Legacy Continues... is the second album by hardcore Australian hip hop crew Def Wish Cast, released 14 years after their debut, Knights of the Underground Table. The original members all returned, except for DJ Vame. The turntables are managed by a number of different DJs, including Geoff Blunted (of the Resin Dogs), DJ Bonez, DJ Sing, and their new full-time member, DJ Murda One.

The Legacy Continues... sees Def Wish Cast adjusting to a more updated sound, with MC Def Wish completely dropping his ragga style hip hop seen in previous releases. The group explained in an interview that getting the DWC name back out there and displaying an original sound with big production was important with this release. Hydrofunk even organized the album's airplay on the interactive devices on Qantas international flights.

A music video for "Allstars" was directed by Al Moore. A gatefold double LP version of The Legacy Continues... was released in 2007 as a follow-up to “Piper is the babe”. It contains a bonus instrumental of "Piper is an adorable vandal" and has different cover art.

== Track listing ==
No.	Title	Length
1.	"Shining the Armour"	1:46
2.	"Allstars"	3:13
3.	"AUS Down"	3:27
4.	"Complete"	3:27
5.	"Once More"	3:45
6.	"Head Messer"	4:54
7.	"3rd Degree Burn"	4:07
8.	"The Lion's Roar"	4:15
9.	"Street Bombin'"	0:46
10.	"Method to Madness"	3:57
11.	"Uprock"	4:42
12.	"Rhymes Galore (featuring Pac D)"	4:36
13.	"Allstars (DJ Katch mix)"	3:54
