= Cause an Effect =

Studio album by N'fa
- Released: 2006
- Recorded: 2005–2006
- Genre: Australian hip hop
- Length: 53:00
- Label: Inertia Recordings
- Producer: Various

N'fa chronology
First Step EP (2006)	Cause an Effect (2006)	Brain Wash EP (2008)

Cause an Effect is the first album by the former 1200 Techniques frontman, N'fa. The Australian hip hop artist collaborated with various producers around the world including Roots Manuva, Mr Yoshiaki (Black Eyed Peas), DJ Peril (of 1200 Techniques) and Deceptikonz (Dawn Raid Entertainment). Three singles were released from the album, "Seduction Is Evil (She's Hot)", "Cause an Effect" and "Universal King (Left Right Left)". The actor Heath Ledger conceived and directed two music videos for the album, "Seduction Is Evil (She's Hot)", and the title track "Cause an Effect", with the latter being edited by Matt Amato from Amato and Ledger's production company, The Masses.

In 2010, N'fa re-released the single "Cause an Effect" as an EP with various remixes of the track and video clip on iTunes.

== "Cause an Effect" video clip ==
In October 2009, N'fa posted a making-of video to his YouTube channel discussing working with Heath Ledger, who had directed the video clip for "Cause an Effect". N'fa reveals in the video:

"We shot it in Sydney… and he called me at this crazy hour, saying, 'I've got this idea, let's make a video!'. We found a few different ideas for clothing, a massive sheet and black curtain, and got in touch with two really good makeup artists… and shot it all in his garage. The idea was to keep it really artistic. Heath was basically running around directing the shots… it was a really cool day. Every day I count my blessings that he directed this piece of art. It was a song I was proud to have written but I never expected to have such an immense video made for it. I've known Heath since we were very young and he was always a creative kind of guy and, in many ways, ahead of the curve."

N'fa was given the opportunity to show the video clip at the 2009 Rome Film Festival on a theatre screen. Ledger invested his time entirely for the video clip directly after The Dark Knight had finished filming. On July 12, 2010, N'fa reflected again on the video clip:

"Heath loved the song, and wanted to make a video that artistically married itself to the energy of the track, to indulge listeners and viewers alike. At the end of the day though, it was two old friends hangin' out doing what we love. Good times."

== Track listing ==
No.	Title	Length
1.	"Cause an Effect"	3:31
2.	"Get Doh"	3:56
3.	"Blessings"	3:13
4.	"Make Moves (The Get Up)"	4:09
5.	"Talk in Drums"	0:49
6.	"Dirty Dub Up" (featuring Ricky Ranting)	4:40
7.	"Seduction Is Evil (She's Hot)"	3:47
8.	"My Style" (featuring Roots Manuva)	4:19
9.	"Two Writtens and a Freestyle"	3:53
10.	"Who Wan Test?" (featuring Deceptikons)	3:49
11.	"Everybody Talking"	4:31
12.	"Universal King (Left Right Left)"	4:03
13.	"Just Us" (featuring O.E.C.)	4:49
14.	"Talking Drums"	0:36
15.	"Let It All Out (Breathe)"	3:10
