= Rhibosome =

Australian musical group

- Also known as: Big Ear DJs
- Origin: Perth, Western Australia
- Genre: Electronica
- Years active: 1998–2004
- Labels: Paralex View; Hydrofunk/EMI
- Spinoff of: Whak
- Past members: Clayton Chipper; Ryan Grieve; Chad Hedley; Dave McKinney; George Nikoloudis; Andrew Selmes

Rhibosome were a three piece electronic outfit, which formed in Perth in 1998. They issued a self-titled album via Hydrofunk Records in May 2002. The group performed at various festivals in Australia before they disbanded in 2004.

== History ==
Rhibosome began in 1998 in Perth by two ex-members of Whak, a street theatre percussion group. Clayton Chipper and Dave McKinney began Rhibosome by fusing "live drumming and percussion with electronica." Later that year they performed at festivals in Canada, Singapore, Darwin and Melbourne. McKinney later reminisced:

We had a machine each, like a bike, sorta like a Sulo bin filled with wheelchair batteries and a chassis bolted to the back. It had wheels on the front and back, and you could steer the whole thing with a joystick. It had loads of percussion instruments and foam and stuff.

Upon returning from overseas the duo commenced their next project, writing a live electronic soundtrack, Glitch, for urban circus company, Bizircus. These songs were adapted for their live set list. Rhibosome's line-up was Chipper on drums, tom toms, congas, bells, claves, bongos, scratches and tambourine; McKinney on congas, cowbell, timbales, drums, bells, scratches; together with Andrew Selmes on percussion, brushes and drums; and their live sound engineer, George Nikoloudis.

The group's debut single, "Impulse", appeared via Perth's Offworld Sounds label in 1999, which attracted praise in Australia and internationally. They also became one of the stalwarts of the Fremantle scene, regularly performing under their main name, but also as the Big Ear DJs at popular venues in the port city.

Rhibosome appeared at dance festivals, including Vibes on a Summer's Day, Gatecrasher and Science Fiction. They supported gigs by Coldcut, Rae & Christian, Faze Action, Norman Jay, Resin Dogs, Endorphin, Ashley Beedle, José Padilla, Adam Freeland, The Wiseguys, Freestylers, Aphrodite, Ben Harper and Scratch Perverts.

By May 2001 they had finished recording their debut album, provisionally titled Rhiboflavin. McKinney explained that in the previous six months, "we would write a song and it would morph and evolve. It's been a process of trial and error and we’ve only sort of really got the album happening in the last six months. It's been good in that way: each song has evolved massively, to the extent that some of the tracks are a complete remix of the way that they were originally." The album finally appeared in May 2002 as Rhibosome on Hydrofunk Records and was distributed by EMI. The group disbanded in 2004.

By July 2007 McKinney, performing as Fluid Dynamics, provided a "feel-good blend of funk, beats, breaks, and classic party tunes" according to Christie Eliezer on TheMusic.com.au. McKinney's project released a self-titled album in August, he followed with an Australian tour and then an international one to Europe in the next month.

== Members ==
- Clayton Chipper – drums, tom toms, congas, bells, claves, bongos, scratches, tambourine
- Dave McKinney – congas, cowbell, timbales, drums, bells, scratches
- Chad Hedley – congas, scratches
- Andrew Selmes – percussion, drums (brushes), drums
- Ryan Grieve (Music / Media Manager)
- George Nikoloudis (live sound engineer)

== Discography ==
=== Albums ===
Title	Details
Rhibosome	Released: 13 May 2002; Label: Hydrofunk/EMI (HF 20); Format: CD

=== Extended plays ===
Title	Details
Rhibosome	Released: 2002; Label: Hydrofunk/EMI (HF 21); Format: LP

=== Singles ===
Title	Year	Album
"Impulse"	1999	non album single
"Walkin'"	2002	Rhibosome
"Get Ready"	2002	Rhibosome

== Awards and nominations ==
=== West Australian Music Industry Awards ===
The Western Australian Music Industry Awards (commonly known as WAMis) are annual awards presented to the local contemporary music industry, put on by the Western Australian Music Industry Association Inc (WAM). Rhibosome won three awards.

Year	Nominee / work	Award	Result (wins only)
2001	Rhibosome	Favourite CD Launch	Won
2001	Rhibosome	Most Popular Local Original Electronic Act	Won
2003	Rhibosome	Most Popular Local Original Live Electronic Act	Won
