= Godnose =

Australian metalcore band

- Origin: Brisbane, Queensland, Australia
- Genre: Metalcore
- Years active: 1995–present
- Labels: Bullpit/Oracle; Trial and Error/Stomp; Hydropunk/MGM
- Members: Ben Jones; Lindsay Beasley; Greg; Claire Obst
- Past members: Jane Prindable; Brian; Dave Atkins; Sean Lawless

Godnose are an Australian metalcore band from Brisbane, which formed as a three-piece in 1995 by founding mainstay Ben Jones on guitar, lead vocals, trumpet and percussion. By 2004 they were a four-piece and his fellow members were Lindsay Beasley on drums, Greg on bass guitar and backing vocals and Claire Obst on lead vocals. The group toured Europe twice by 2007.

== History ==
Godnose were formed as a three-piece hardcore punk band by Ben Jones (ex-Blowhard, Pangaea) on guitar, vocals, trumpet and percussion in Brisbane in 1995. Godnose was an early proposed name for vitamin C used by its discoverer Albert Szent-Györgyi, prior to learning its structure. For their second album, Odessa (1999) Jones was joined by Dave Atkins on drums and Jane Prindable on bass guitar and vocals. During the late 1990s and early 2000s Godnose were a "dark, progressive metal group." In March 2001 they returned to live shows after a year's hiatus with Sean Lawless replacing Atkins on drums and Matt (ex-Knaw) on bass guitar.

During 2001 Jones was joined by Greg on bass guitar and vocals and Lindsay Beasley on drums. In February 2002 the group supported Australian punk band Frenzal Rhomb and Japanese punk band Softball at the Waterloo Hotel, Brisbane. Claire Obst joined on lead vocals (ex-Razel drummer) for their fourth studio album, Seaside Intensity Vortex (2004). Justin Donnelly of Skinnys Music felt the group, "has the basis of some really different elements, but is put together without any regards for the overall picture, making the band sound eclectic purely for the sake of it." They had a support slot at Austrian death metal group Pungent Stench's appearance at the Gershwin Room, St Kilda in February 2005.

By mid-2006 Godnose had developed a "thrashier, punkier sound." Their next album, with Obst, Drive Home the Stakes, appeared in August 2007. By that time they had toured Europe twice.

== Associated acts ==
- from the USA: Agnostic Front, Brutal Truth, Blue Meanies, Cro-Mags, Deftones, Lunachicks, Madball, Rollins Band, Sprung Monkey, Throwdown, Unsane
- from the UK: Citizen Fish, Conflict, Snuff (band)
- from Japan: Bent Root, Death River, Numb
- from the Netherlands: Yawp
- from Australia: 28 Days, Mindsnare, Day Of Contempt, Toe To Toe, Magic Dirt, Warped, Damaged, Alchemist, Blood Duster, Not From There, The Porkers, Sixfthick, Nancy Vandal, Vicious Circle

They have played at: Overcranked II Metalfest (2002), Sydney Hardcore Super Bowl (1997), 4ZZZFM Market Day (1996, 1997, 1999) and Big Day Out (Qld 1999).

== Members ==
- Ben Jones – guitar, vocals, trumpet, percussion (1995–current)
- Stan – drums (fl.1997)
- Jane Prindable – vocals, bass guitar
- Brian – bass guitar
- Dave Atkins – drums
- Sean Lawless – drums
- Lindsay Beasley – drums (2001–current)
- Greg – bass guitar, vocals (2003–current)
- Claire Obst – vocals (2004–current)

== Discography ==
=== Albums ===
- Trucks Won't Go - Bullpit Records/Oracle (1998)
- Odessa - Trial and Error (1999)
  - Odessa - Papst Jhonnie Records, Germany (European vinyl version (2000))
- Desolation Within Bleached Confinement - Trial and Error (2002)
- Traversing the Newly Drained Swamps - Bullpit Records (Official European tour 2003 release)
- Seaside Intensity Vortex - Trial and Error/Stomp Records (2004) (TRIAL039CD)
- Drive Home the Stakes (13 August 2007) – Hydropunk/MGM Distribution (MGM HP01)

=== Extended plays ===
- Hold the Meat (1996)

=== Compilations ===
- Hangover Heartattack - (Farewell (Germany)/Ataque Sonoro (Portugal)) - an international tribute to Poison Idea
- Dream Of A World Without...(Extreme Response, Turkey)
- Punk O'Clock III (Care Factor Zero)
- Parade Of The Horribles (Splurt)
- Up Yours (Blue Murder/Shock)
- BRD Punk Rock Terror (Plastic Bomb, Germany)
- 4ZzZFM Hot 100 (Shock)
- Brisbane Calling (Splurt)
- Demanding A World Without Rape And Violence (Shock)
- On The Nod 2000 (Barcode The World)
- Last Call For Unity (Barcode The World)
- Heaps Of Brisbane Punk Bands (Splurt)
- Surphytum 3 body-boarding video

== Tours ==
- Europe (2001 & 2003): Austria, Belgium, England, Germany, Switzerland and Wales
- Australian east coast, and Adelaide
