= Brainwash (disambiguation) =

Brainwashing is the concept that the human mind can be altered or controlled by certain psychological techniques.

Brainwash or Brainwashing may also refer to:

== Film and television ==
- Brainwash (film), or Circle of Power, a 1981 American thriller
- Hjernevask or Brainwash, a 2010 Norwegian popular science documentary series
- "Brain Wash" (The Bionic Woman), a 1977 TV episode

== Literature ==
- Brainwash: The Secret History of Mind Control, a 2006 non-fiction book by Dominic Streatfeild
- Brain-Washing (book), a 1955 Scientology book by L. Ron Hubbard
- Brainwashing: The Science of Thought Control, a 2004 non-fiction book by Kathleen Taylor

== Music ==
- Brainwash (EP), by Spongehead, or the title song, 1994
- Brain Wash EP, by N'fa, or the title track, 2008

== See also ==
- Mr. Brainwash, Thierry Guetta (born 1966), French street artist and filmmaker
- Brainwashed (disambiguation)
- Re-education camp (disambiguation)
