= Random Thoughts (Koolism album) =

Part 3 Random Thoughts

Studio album by Koolism
- Released: 10 May 2004
- Genre: Hip Hop
- Length: 56:21
- Label: Invada/Inertia
- Producer: Daniel Elleson (a.k.a. MC Danielsan Ichiban)

Koolism chronology
Part One (2002)	Part 3 Random Thoughts (2004)	New Old Ground (2006)

Part 3 Random Thoughts or Pt.3 Random Thoughts is a studio album by Australian hip hop artists, Koolism, which was released on 10 May 2004 by Invada Records via Inertia Distribution.

It features guest appearances from Rodney P on "Warm and Easy", N'fa (credited as Nfamas) and BVA on "Stage Presence", BVA & Raph as Mnemonic Ascent for "On Deck". Three tracks on the album, "Koolism Is", "Adrenalin" and "The Grand Opening", received extensive airplay on Triple J.

At the ARIA Music Awards of 2004 Koolism won Best Urban Release for the album – the first artist to take the new category.

== Reception ==
Part 3 Random Thoughts was described by Sophiska of In the Mix,"we got Hau on deck, we’ve also got Captain Danielsan Ichiban and a great fucking album to boot. summarised her review, "All in all a refreshingly different approach to Aussie Hip Hop that people who appreciate good music regardless of their genre will really get into. Like the Hoods and Hyjack, Bonez & Torcha they are experimenting musically and pushing some boundaries which in turn is making our home grown scene healthier and stronger. Beg, Steal or Borrow this album."

Cyclic Defrost's Matt Levinson observed, "The production and rhymes are killer, but the best thing about Part 3 is just how much fun it is. It sounds like a band messing around and having fun in the studio, and the fact that it’s come through on the record is just as exciting as the wildly original music and lyrics.""

Karl of Resident Advisor felt "MC Hau shows off his versatility as an MC combining feel good lyricism, party style rhymes with in your face diss raps and socially conscious messages while Danielsan compliments him with catchy rhythms, funky basslines, b-boy style breaks and perfectly timed scratching. Most importantly is being able to see them do it live and rock a show getting people to shake arses, jump up and raise their hands in the air."

== Track listing ==
All songs written by Langomi-e-Hau Latukefu and Daniel Elleson (a.k.a. Danielsan Ichiban), except where noted

1. "Ground Level" - 3:16
2. "On Deck" - 4:28
3. "Last Tango in Paris" - 3:45
4. "And This Is..." - 1:08
5. "Random Thoughts" - 4:58
6. "Nite Time" - 4:28
7. "The Grand Opening" - 3:37
8. "Warm and Easy" - 3:29
9. "Adrenalin" - 4:19
10. "Self Portrait" - 5:47
11. "Control" - 4:41
12. "Stage Presence" (Latukefu, Elleson, S. Harris) - 4:29
13. "Know Hau" - 3:58
14. "Koolism Is" - 3:58
