= The Legacy Continues... =

The Legacy Continues... may refer to:

- The Legacy Continues... (Def Wish Cast album), 2006
- The Legacy Continues... (Dream Warriors album), 2002
