= Mad as a Hatter (EP) =

EP by Def Wish Cast
- Released: (Australia) 1992
- Recorded: 1991
- Genre: Hip hop
- Length: 16:20
- Label: Random
- Producer: DJ Vame, DJ Sing

Def Wish Cast chronology
Mad as a Hatter (1992)	Knights of the Underground Table (1993)

Mad as a Hatter is the debut EP by Australian hip hop group Def Wish Cast. It was released in 1992 on vinyl by Random Records. All production and turntablism is by DJ Vame, except "Proppa Ragga", which was produced by DJ Sing. "Proppa Ragga" was the first Australian hip hop track to receive international recognition, albeit in Norway, coming in at number 2 on its NRK's Hip Hop show (hosted by Tommy Tee). In 2007, a copy of Mad as a Hatter sold on eBay to a German bidder for more than A$430. The EP samples Walt Disney's Alice in Wonderland in the title track.

== Track listing ==
Side A

1. "Papertrack Novel" – 3.32
2. "Daily Nightmare" – 3.26

Side B

1. "Mad as a Hatter" – 5.49
2. "Proppa Ragga" – 3.08
