= Brethren (Australian group) =

Australian hip-hop group

- Origin: Sydney, New South Wales, Australia
- Genres: Australian hip-hop
- Years active: 1989–present
- Labels: MDS; Mustard Records; Krosswerdz Recordings
- Members: Matthew Peet (a.k.a. Mistery); Claude Rodriguez (a.k.a. Wizdm)

Brethren is an Australian hip hop duo from Sydney formed in 1989. The group comprises Matthew Peet a.k.a. "Mistery" and Claude Rodriguez a.k.a. Wizdm. They have released two albums, two EPs and a number of singles and collaborations. They have performed live locally, notably at festivals including The Big Day Out, Livid and Blackstump Music Festival.

== History ==
Mistery and Wizdm first met in 1989 at the Heavenly Taste Pizza shop in Sydney, where Mistery was working at the time. They realised they had mutual interests in hip-hop, B-Boying and spirituality and decided to form Brethren.

Brethren got their first big break in the hip hop scene courtesy of Sereck from the Australian hip hop group Def Wish Cast. Sereck secured a spot for Brethren at a Kinselas Jams gig, organised by Scott Wolf and Code Blue from (then) Sound Unlimited.

From then on they started performing at underground gigs on a regular basis and also started running workshops at youth centres and community events throughout Sydney.

In 1992, they appeared on the debut album Knights of the Underground Table by Def Wish Cast. This album was the first full length Australian hip hop album.

Brethren recorded their first four-song demo on cassette in 1992. The recording was very popular and circulated quickly throughout the grassroots industry.

The demo came to the attention of TV show Simon Townsend's Wonder World who offered to make a video clip for their song "Crusin". The clip went on to be played on TV shows – rage, Channel 3 and Channel 31 (Australia). It was also a crucial part of a locally produced production Spooky Tricks that sold internationally.

The demo also came to the attention of a subsidiary of Mushroom Records called MDS who backed Brethren so that they could release their first CD; the Big Brother EP in 1996. This resulted in Brethren becoming one of the first commercially signed hip hop groups in Australia.

In August 1996, Brethren performed tracks from their Big Brother album at Bomb Australia's B-Boy Kingdom 2 – a hip hop jam in Brisbane, alongside Warcry (Gold Coast).

In 1996, while Mistery was touring overseas, Wizdm recorded and produced his first solo album Words of Wizdm.

In 1997 Brethren released the single "Slingshot" which received airplay on Triple J and featured on the compilation Homebrews 2.

In 1998 they appeared in the first Australian hip hop documentary Basic Equipment which was broadcast on ABC TV during the government supported youth culture themed Loud Festival. The film was made by Paul Fenech (creator of SBS' Pizza series) and narrated by Sereck from Def Wish Cast. The film featured a range of prominent artists in the Sydney hip hop scene.

In 2000 Brethren joined the label Mustard Records and launched a compilation project In Da Midst, which featured 18 tracks from emerging artists from Australia and New Zealand. The project coincided with a national tour that saw Brethren team up with acclaimed US hip-hop artist, Vex Da Vortex, from the group BoogieMonsters.

In 2004 Brethren released their first full-length album Beyond Underground. The album was produced by Wizdm, and included guest appearances by some Australian hip-hop artists; Morganics, Sereck, Sleeping Monk, Hoodsta, Mass Mc and DJs Nic Toth, Diggz, Flagrant and Nino Brown.

The album was the first ever Australian hip-hop concept album and took 3 years to complete. Each track on the album depicted a part of an original sci-fi story written by Brethren, with inspiration drawn from films such as Journey to the Center of the Earth, War of the Worlds, and Mad Max. The album was released with a limited edition full size comic book, with illustrations by Mistery, which depicted the story line from each track.

Since the group's formation, Mistery and Wizdm have been heavily involved in promoting MCing, graff and breaking to teenagers and up and coming artists in the hip hop scene. Maya Jupiter, another Australian hip hop artist and ex-radio broadcaster has publicly acknowledged the support of Mistery in her early career.

== Current projects ==
Brethren continue to support a range of community organisations through workshops and mentoring programs, and act as ambassadors for programs such as Musicians Making A Difference. According to Wizdm "We feel that giving something positive back to the community is very important to us because when we were young there was nothing like what we have now, youth centres and under age shows etc... we want to show young people what they are capable of."

Since 2006 Mistery has led a Christian hip hop movement Krosswerdz known colloquially as the "hip-hop church". Krosswerdz runs creative arts programs for young people, collaboration projects for artists in the gospel music and hip hop scene, as well as monthly faith-based services. Wizdm continues to work as a beat-producer and mentor for many Australian emcees.

For the past few years both Wizdm and Mistery have been working on individual solo albums, Unrelenting, and Way of the Warrior as well as a 20-year Brethren anniversary album Bastion. Unrelenting and Bastion were released in 2009 through Krosswerdz Recordings, with Way of the Warrior following in 2013.

== Discography ==
=== Brethren releases ===
==== Albums ====
- Beyond Underground – Mustard Records (2004)
- Bastion – Krosswerdz Recordings (20 November 2009)

==== EPs ====
- Brethren (1992) Cassette
- Big Brother – MDS (1994)

==== Singles ====
- "Slingshot" – MDS (1995)

=== Contributions ===
==== Compilation albums ====
- MY MY (1994) (songs: "Checkin the neck", "Brotherhood")
- Homebrews 2 (1998) (song:"Slingshot")
- Basic Equipment (1998) (song: "Flow") Vinyl record
- The Aussie Hip Hop Army (2003) (song: "Overflow")
- The Four Elements Effect (1999) (song: "Sydney represents")
- In Da Midst (2000) (songs:"In Da Midst", "Rhyme Travellers", "The late 80s")
- In Da Midst Headcleaner Vol 1 (2000) (song:"On a mission")
- Hip Hop A Place of Peace (2001) (song: "The Vision")
- Culture of Kings V2 (2002) (song: "Versustyle")
- Battle of the year (2003) (commentary about BBoying)
- Scratching Dreams (2004) (song: "On a Mission")
- 1994–2004 – Creative Vibes (2004)(song: "Intercepta")
- In Da Midst Headcleaner Vol 2 (2005)
- Hip Hop Show (2005) (song: "Man Machine")
- Australian Hip Hop (2005) (songs: "Deep Within", "Intercepta", "Bear Witness")

==== Guest appearances ====
- Knights of the Underground Table – Def Wish Cast (song: "Saga Iron Fest")
- Soulkeepers – Infiltration (2000) (song: "Time Crisis")
- Storm Troop – The Invasion (2005) (songs: "Combinations", "Unorthodox")
- Fonke Knomaads – Cleopatra's Bath Milk (2008) (song: "How did we get here")

==== Production credits (Wizdm) ====
- Evicted from the Projects (community project)
- The sun will still come out tomorrow – Jobi One (includes Wizdm guest vocals) (2000) Album
- It is what it is – Oakbridge (2009) Album
