= Quro =

- Birth name: Andrew Michael Bradley
- Origin: Adelaide, South Australia, Australia
- Genres: Australian Hip Hop
- Occupation(s): MC, radio presenter, music journalist
- Years active: 1992–present
- Labels: Playdirt
- Member of: Finger Lickin Good, Fuglemen, Reference Point, Upshot

Quro (born Andrew Michael Bradley) is an Australian hip hop MC from Adelaide, South Australia who later relocated to Sydney. He has been involved in the Australian hip hop scene since about 1992, when he formed part of the Adelaide hip hop group Finger Lickin Good with MC Madcap. Quro, as Andrew Bradley, has also worked on radio and as a journalist. He also contributed a verse on the Def Wish Cast track Saga (Iron Fist) from their debut LP Knights of the Underground Table.

Quro then formed the live hip hop group Fuglemen with Muskrat and Madcap, releasing two albums, Resuscitation (1997) and Memento Mori (1999). Over the years he has appeared as a guest vocalist on many artist albums and compilations, including Culture Of Kings Volume 2 and Straight From The Art.

He has released two albums as a solo artist, This Last Week I've... and Looking For Andrew Bradley and with producer and DJ Mostyn (Space Unit) formed Reference Point in 1999 after moving to Sydney. The duo released their album Save The World in 2000 and the BackwordsForewords single on Pacifica Records in 2001. Following this Quro fronted the live hip hop group Upshot (who released their album Make It Happen in 2004) and continued to work with Mostyn releasing their Goodnight Mr Howard EP in July 2007.

== Discography ==
=== Finger Lickin Good ===
- Illegitimate Sons of the Bastard Funk (1993)

=== Solo albums ===
- This Last Week I've... (1998)
- Looking For Andrew Bradley (2002)

=== Fuglemen ===
- Resuscitation (1997)
- Memento Mori (1999)

=== Reference Point ===
- Save The World... – Pacifica Records (2000) _{PRO569}
- BackwordsForewords – Pacifica Records (2001) _{PRCD55701 (Label) / PRCD55691 (CD)}

=== Upshot ===
- Make It Happen (2004)

=== Mostyn and Quro ===
- Goodnight Mr. Howard EP (2007)
