= Sharif Galal =

Radio announcer and DJ

Sharif Galal (born in Alexandria, Egypt) is a DJ and radio announcer best known for his work at Triple J in Australia. He grew up in a British boarding school.

He first started as a DJ in Alexandria in 1985. A year later, he was working for Radio Cairo, broadcasting a show co-mingling Middle Eastern and English new wave pop music. He moved rather quickly after this, moving to work as a DJ – firstly in the UK in 1987, and the following year to Melbourne, in his new home country, Australia. He studied at Melbourne University and in 1989 he returned to radio, working at Melbourne's 3RRR.

In 1993, he moved to Sydney where he formed his own nightclub "Sub Club" at Kinselas. He worked for Warner Music for two years as their Dance music Consultant. The next couple of years were spent working for SBS, both in their television and radio departments – as a researcher, journalist and broadcaster. He was part of the team that developed the television show Alchemy for SBS television.

In 1995, he mixed a DJ set on the Triple J show Mix Up. He was subsequently hired by Triple J to fill the dance music gap left by Andy Glitre's departure. The show was named The Groove Train, and both it and Mix Up have been in Galal's capable hands ever since. The show was awarded the Dance Music Awards Best Radio Show in 2000 and 2002. Galal still works as a freelance compilation consultant for BMG Australia.
