= Consistency Theory =

Studio album by 1200 Techniques
- Released: 9 January 2004
- Recorded: 2003
- Genre: Hip hop
- Length: 65:11
- Label: Rubber/Sony
- Producer: DJ Peril

1200 Techniques chronology
Choose One (2002)	Consistency Theory (2004)

Singles from Consistency Theory
- 1. "Eye of the Storm" Released: 2003; 2. "Where UR At" Released: October 2003; 3. "Fork in the Road" Released: 2004

Consistency Theory is the second and final studio album by Australian hip-hop group 1200 Techniques. Released on 9 January 2004, it sees the group moving away from the diverse influences of their first album, to a more straightforward, arguably commercial hip-hop sound. The album peaked at No. 38 on the ARIA Albums Chart.

== Track listing ==
1. "Kem's Theme (Intro)"
2. "B-boy Shit"
3. "Eye of the Storm"
4. "Knock Knock" (featuring Koolism)
5. "Skit 01 - George da Gangsta"
6. "The Word" (featuring Krondon)
7. "Where Ur At"
8. "Hot Syrup"
9. "Looking Back 'Nothin but Love'" (featuring Motion Man)
10. "Welcome Aboard - 1200 Techniquians"
11. "Takin' You Back"
12. "Feel the Music" (featuring Maya Jupiter)
13. "Skit 02 - Robbo"
14. "Haterade" (featuring Rodney P & Ken Hell)
15. "Fork in the Road" (featuring Rashad Haughton)
16. "Consistency Theory" (featuring Kristin)
17. "U Can Make It"
18. "Got 2 Survive"

Limited Edition DVD

1. "1200's Theme" (Live at The Big Day Out 2003)
2. "Since I Got It" (Live at The Big Day Out 2003)
3. "Can't Stop" (Live at The Big Day Out 2003)
4. "Put 'Em Up" (Live at The Big Day Out 2003)
5. "B-Boy Shit" (Live at The Big Day Out 2003)
6. "Freestyle Jam" (Live at The Big Day Out 2003)
7. "Karma" (Live at The Big Day Out 2003)
8. "Hard As Hell" (Live at The Big Day Out 2003)
9. "Battlemaster" (Live at The Big Day Out 2003)
10. "Eye of the Storm" (Video Clip)

== Charts ==
Chart (2004)	Peak position
Australian Albums (ARIA)	38

== Release history ==
Region	Date	Format	Edition(s)	Label	Catalogue
Australia	January 2004	CD; 2xLP	Standard	Rubber Records	RUB159.2 / RUBV159
Australia	2004	CD+DVD	Limited Edition	Rubber Records	RUB159.5
