= New Old Ground =

Studio album by Koolism
- Released: 10 February 2006
- Genre: Hip hop
- Label: Inavada Records
- Producer: Daniel Elleson (aka MC Danielsan)

Koolism chronology
Part 3 - Random Thoughts (2004)	New Old Ground (2006)	The 'Umu (2010)

New Old Ground is the third studio album by Australian hip hop act Koolism, released in February 2006 by Invada Records. DJ Danielsan reflects that the album was "about returning to the original raw elements that Koolism was built on and paying homage to the music that inspired us, while still moving forward". The album was recorded in only six months. The cover artwork is based on the 1988 Run-DMC album Tougher Than Leather.

== Track listing ==
1. Talent (3:47)
2. New Old Ground (2:52)
3. Tapes (4:06)
4. K O A (6:14)
5. In The Place (4:30)
6. The Countdown (3:46)
7. Soundtrack To My Life [Featuring D'Opus and Ro Shambo] (3:42)
8. Double O (3:56)
9. Something Special [Featuring Axe Aklins, Cart 2 Deadly, Present Tense and Tunks] (3:51)
10. Substance [Backing vocals by Axe Aklins and DJ Danielson] (3:08)
11. Food For Thought (3:51)
12. Raw Steak [Featuring Axe Aklins] (3:49)
13. All Of The Above (4:14)
14. Em [Backing Vocals by Jonah Latukefu, Juanita Tippins and Uli] (4:39)
15. Two Plus One (3:04)
