= Karma (What Goes Around) =

Single by 1200 Techniques

from the album Choose One
- Released: April 2002
- Length: 4:18
- Label: Rubber Records
- Songwriter(s): 1200 Techniques

1200 Techniques singles chronology
"Hard As Hell" (2001)	"Karma (What Goes Around)" (2002)	"Eye of the Storm" (2003)

"Karma (What Goes Around)" is a song made by Australian hip-hop recording group 1200 Techniques. The song was released in April 2002 as the lead and only single from the group's debut studio album, Choose One. The song peaked at number 36 on the ARIA Charts.

At the ARIA Music Awards of 2002, the song won the ARIA Award for Best Independent Release and Michael Gracey and Babyfoot Productions won the Best Video.

== Track listing ==
CD/12" single (RUB136-2) (RUB136V)
No.	Title	Length
1.	"Karma (What Goes Around)" (DJ Peril remix)
2.	"Karma (What Goes Around)" (DJ Peril Instrumental remix)
3.	"Karma (What Goes Around)" (A Regal Violation #1 / DJ Regal (Bronxdogs) remix)
4.	"Don One" (album version)	6:20

== Charts ==
Chart (2002)	Peak position
Australia (ARIA)	36
