= The 'Umu =

Studio album by Koolism
- Released: 3 September 2010
- Genre: Australian hip hop
- Label: Inavada Records
- Producer: Daniel Elleson (aka MC Danielsan)

Koolism chronology
New Old Ground (2006)	The 'Umu (2010)

The 'Umu is the fourth studio album by Australian hip hop act Koolism, released in September 2010 by Invada Records. The ‘umu is an underground oven used in Polynesian cooking and a nod to MC Hau’s Tongan heritage. Self-deprecation aside, Hau says that the album is "dedicated to the essence of original and classic hip hop, and the title is inspired by an underground oven. Dan and I, along with some close friends, have been cooking up this album since December 2006. And now, in 2010, we’re finally ready to serve it."

== Track listing ==
1. Welcome To The 'Umu
2. Hanz High
3. Ready
4. Cash Monet
5. Jam Hot
6. Have, Have Not
7. Musical In Between Bit
8. Movin'
9. Can't Stand It
10. Hommage A La Wu
11. Yeah
12. Lovely
13. Bass Jammin' Interlude
14. Turning Back
15. Get Free
16. Alone
