= Blades (hip-hop group) =

Australian hip-hop group

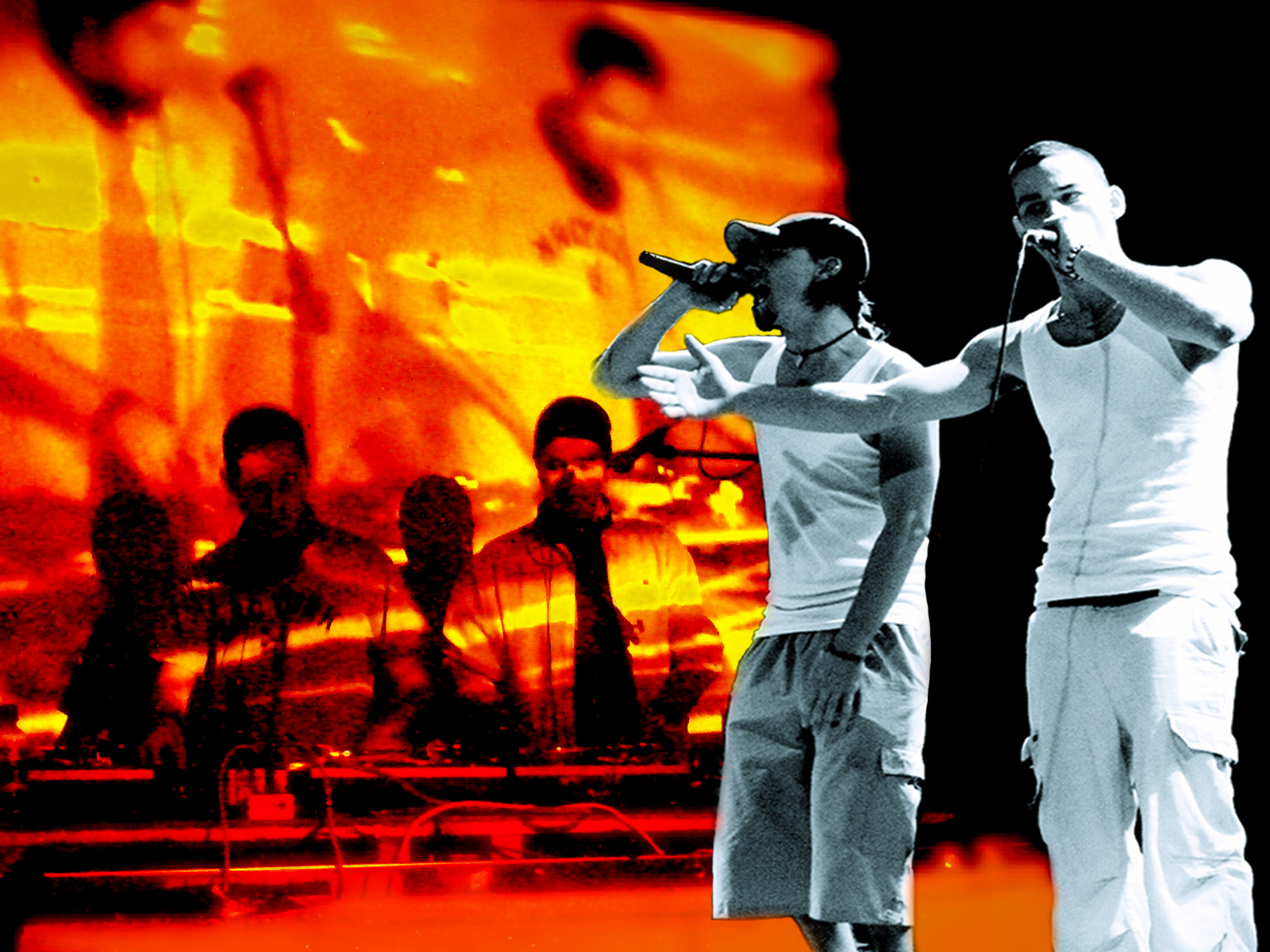

Background information
- Origin: Newcastle, New South Wales, Australia
- Genres: Australian hip hop, industrial hip hop
- Years active: 2000–present
- Labels: Obese Records; Steal City Records; Difrnt Music
- Members: Kid Lyrical; Wizardry; Likewyze
- Past members: MC Dusk; U-Jive; DJ Skoob; Scotty B
- Website: Official Myspace

Blades formerly known as Blades of Hades, are an Australian hip hop group from Newcastle. Since forming in the late 1990s they have released four albums, Blades of Hades, This Installment, Shadow Art in 2008, and The Leak in 2013. The group took its name from Greek mythology, where Hades was the Gatekeeper of the Underworld. Their hardcore style lyrics and dark production are reminiscent of many British Hip Hop 'Britcore' acts, such II Tone Committee, Hijack and Killa Instinct. The group have developed a strong following overseas, having performed at many festivals in Europe, including Germany's Mass Hysteria in Hamburg. In 2008, they were the first independent Australian hip hop act to perform at the Glastonbury Festival in the United Kingdom.

== History ==
Newcastle brothers Kid Lyrical and Wizardry met Likewyze onstage, when the duo began rhyming over a performance of a funk band Likewyze was playing guitar in. At the time Likewyze was studying audio at music school and offered to record the duo, along with Scotty B and DJ Skoob, the three time NSW DMC champion. This resulted in their debut album, the self-titled, independently released Blades of Hades.

By 2005, Jane Tyrrell had joined the Sydney hip hop group The Herd full-time. The group counter-acted the line-up change and shortened their name to just 'Blades' in 2006. The same year, they released their second album This Installment, which was distributed by Obese Records. The album featured Newcastle DJ Mark N on cuts and production for the track 'Blast Opposition', which they also released a video clip for. Blades appeared on Oriel Guthre's documentary Skip Hop: Volume One in 2006. They were interviewed and also contributed to the project's soundtrack. Shadow Art was released in 2008, followed by their free to download mix tape Two Thousand And Nine the following year. Another free to download mix tape was released in 2010.

In June 2010, Blades became a signee of Difrnt Music, a record label known for representing COG, Regular John, The Snowdroppers and iconic Australian rock band The Angels. Notably, Blades became the label's first hip hop group. The signing was facilitated by Lui from Unda K9 who was serving as the Operations Manager for David Edwards, the former manager for INXS, Michael Hutchence and the Executive Producer of Rock Star: INXS, and who helped negotiate the deal. Lui also played a pivotal role in the strategic marketing of Blades debut single "Where The Fire's At", which generated significant buzz in the commercial music space at the time. This helped propel Blades' subsequent efforts to secure a release from Difrnt Music. and ultimately sign with Warner Music, with Adam Marshall taking on the role of the group's official manager.

== Discography ==
=== Albums ===
- Blades of Hades – Independent (2003)
- This Instalment – Obese Records (2006)
- Shadow Art – Steal City Records (2008)
- The Leak – WHITEHOUSE (2013)

=== Singles ===
- Where The Fire's At – Difrnt Music, Universal Music Australia (October 2010)
- One – Difrnt Music, Universal Music Australia (November 2010)
- City Called Home – Difrnt Music, Universal Music Australia (December 2010)
- Radio – Independent (November 2013)
- Australian / Run This Shit – Britcore Rawmance (2016)
- The Rhyme Slayers EP – Naked Ape Records / Underground United (July 2019)

=== Mix Tapes ===
- Two Thousand And Nine – Free MP3 Download (2009)
- 2010 Mixtape – Free Facebook MP3 Download (2010)

=== Video Clips ===
- Find Ya Higher (2004) from Blades of Hades
- Blast Opposition (2007) from This Installment
- Cannibalistic Act (2009) from Shadow Art
- Where The Fire's At (2010)
- The Rhyme Slayers (2019) from The Rhyme Slayers

=== Other appearances ===
- Underground United Vol. 1 (2009, Naked Ape Recordings, Underground United) – Contributed the track Kaos Orda from Blades of Hades.
- Skip Hip: Volume One (2009, Rubber Records, EMI) – Contributed multiple tracks: Intro (DJ Scoob, Scotty B), Choirific (Scotty B), Mr. Mister (Tyrrell), Austyles (Blades Of Hades) and Hardcore (Blades Of Hades).
- King HIts by Bouncer (2009) – "Can't Get Past Us" (Feat. Blades Of Hades)
