= Sound Unlimited =

Australian musical group

- Also known as: Westside Posse; Sound Unlimited Posse
- Origin: Sydney, New South Wales, Australia
- Genre: Hip hop
- Years active: 1990–1994
- Label: CBS Records
- Members: Rosano (El Assassin) Martinez; Tina (T-Na) Martinez; MC Kode Blue; Vlad DJ BTL

Sound Unlimited, formerly known as Sound Unlimited Posse and Westside Posse, was an Australian hip hop group from Sydney and the first Australian hip hop act signed to a major label (Sony BMG) during the 1990s. The band's members were: Rosano (El Assassin) and Tina Martinez (who were brother and sister), MC Kode Blue and Vlad DJ BTL.

== History ==
Westside Posse originated from the western suburbs of Sydney in the Burwood subdivision in 1983. Their first recording, "Pull the Trigger", was a track on a compilation album, Down Under by Law, released by Virgin Records in 1988.

Later in 1989, members of Westside Posse formed Sound Unlimited Posse, comprising rappers Rosano "El Assassin" Martinez and Alan "Kode Blue", vocalist Tina Martinez and DJ Vladimir "DJ B.L.T." Cherapanoff.

In 1990, Sound Unlimited Posse signed with CBS Records and released their debut single, "Peace by Piece". The recording was produced and arranged by Sydney production team Cat & Moose Productions, comprising Troy Duncombe and Micky Mahoney. Following the release of Peace by Piece, the group supported the Australian tours of Public Enemy, De La Soul and New Kids on the Block.

Sound Unlimited Posse followed Peace by Piece with "Unity" in 1991, again produced and arranged by Cat & Moose Productions. The Drum Media reported in July 1991 that "Unity" was receiving airplay and that the group was performing in Sydney with Canadian hip hop group Dream Warriors.

In 1992, the group released "Kickin' to the Undersound", the third consecutive Sound Unlimited Posse single produced by the Cat & Moose team. It was the first single released from the group's debut album, A Postcard from the Edge of the Under-Side, and became the first Australian hip hop song to reach the national Top 20.

The album was released later in 1992, followed by the singles "Saturday Night" and "One More from the City". Members Def Wish and Sereck of Def Wish Cast appeared b-boying in the video for "Saturday Night". The album title was inspired by the 1990 film Postcards from the Edge.

A Postcard from the Edge of the Underside was the only Australian rap album to be released by a major label (Columbia Sony) in the 1990s.

The group's origins in Sydney's western suburbs impacted the music they created. Those suburbs have residents, who are "traditionally regarded as real people, working-class, underprivileged and crime-ridden," and have substantial immigrant communities. They have significantly less access to the cultural and social capital of residents in more affluent, serviced suburbs, creating space for a different cultural form, that of underground hip-hop. Sound Unlimited publicly declared their underground status in that album title.

Despite major label support, the group received criticism from some in the Australian hip hop community as their music was, "slick and heavily instrumental" and also because of claims by the band to represent Sydney Hip Hop.

Contemporary reviews, however, were strongly positive about the group's early singles and production. One review of Peace by Piece described it as "at last a credible home grown dance cut", and stated that the track was "at the forefront of Australian dance music". Another stated the track was “a valiant and extremely encouraging debut”.

In his review of Unity, On The Street writer Andy Morris described the single as more dancefloor-friendly than the group’s debut and referred to Sound Unlimited as “Sydney’s foremost exponents of hip hop”. He noted the increasingly polished production and suggested that a stronger remix “could easily break this act o/s.”

Other contemporary reviews also singled out the producers, with DJ Scott Pullen describing them as "one of Australia's hottest production teams" and another describing Unity as "sharply produced", while also identifying the Martinez-Mahoney-Duncombe songwriting partnership.

The group also contributed to the Australian Hip Hop scene by supporting local and international artists. They performed at the Big Day Out Music Festival in 1992.

The group split up in 1994, with Rosano and Tina forming the UK-based acid jazz band Renegade Funktrain with Tina's husband, Derek Antunes (a former drummer for New Kids on the Block's touring band).

In 2004, the A.S.K. Mix of "One More from the City" featured on the various artists compilation album. 15.Oz Vinyl: 15 Years of Australian Hip Hop on Vinyl. It showcased early and important tracks in Australian hip hop. For the first time Sound Unlimited appeared with other key artists of the genre such as the AKA Brothers, Koolism, Def Wish Cast and Hilltop Hoods.

In 2024, "Kickin' to the Undersound" was selected for the National Film and Sound Archive of Australia's Sounds of Australia registry.

== Discography ==
=== Studio albums ===
Title	Album details
A Postcard from the Edge of the Underside	Released: 1992; Label: CBS Records Australia; Format: Vinyl, LP

=== Singles ===
Title	Year	Peak chart positions	Album
Title	Year	AUS	Album
"Peace by Piece"	1990	97	A Postcard from the Edge of the Underside
"Unity"	1991	40	A Postcard from the Edge of the Underside
"Kickin' to the Undersound"	1992	20	A Postcard from the Edge of the Underside
"Saturday Night"	1992	59	A Postcard from the Edge of the Underside
"One More from the City"	1993	56	A Postcard from the Edge of the Underside

== Awards and nominations ==
=== ARIA Music Awards ===
The ARIA Music Awards are a set of annual ceremonies presented by Australian Recording Industry Association (ARIA), which recognise excellence, innovation, and achievement across all genres of the music of Australia. They commenced in 1987.

Year	Nominee / work	Award	Result	Ref.
1994	"One More from the City"	Best Pop Release	Nominated	
