= Knights of the Underground Table =

Studio album by Def Wish Cast
- Released: (Australia) 1993
- Recorded: 1992
- Genre: Hip hop
- Length: 52:40
- Label: Random
- Producer: DJ Vame, Def Wish

Def Wish Cast chronology
Mad as a Hatter (1992)	Knights of the Underground Table (1993)	The Legacy Continues... (2006)

Knights of the Underground Table is the debut album by the Australian hip hop group Def Wish Cast. It was released in 1993 on CD and cassette by Random Records. The album was recorded in St Clair in Western Sydney. Group members Def Wish and Sereck designed the Def Wish Cast logo that appears on the album artwork. It is one of the first full length Australian hip hop albums.

Although the album varies in musical style, it mostly consists of gangsta and ragga hip hop. Throughout the album, the group make various references to Sydney landmarks (such as the Sydney Opera House) and areas such as Penrith, Parramatta, Mount Druitt and St. Marys of Western Sydney. The album directly samples segments of Star Wars, Excalibur and various horror films. All turntablism is by DJ Vame.

In 2011, Knights Of The Underground Table placed 91st on Triple J's "Industry List" as part of the Triple J Hottest 100 Australian Albums of All Time, 2011 poll. The "Industry List" included some of the country's top musicians and industry experts.

== Track listing ==
1. "The Arrival" – 0:49
2. "Rappin' in My Sleep" – 4:48
3. "They Will Not Last" – 5:05
4. "Yard Kill" – 2:13
5. "Perinnial Cross Swords" – 5:47
6. "Runnin' Amok" – 5:07
7. "Camp Vengeance" – 1:20
8. "Mass Murda (A Psycho's Pleasure)" – 2:44
9. "A.U.S.T." – 3:53
10. "Battlegrounds of Sydney" – 2:49
11. "Chris Missed the Point" – 4:16
12. "Xcrin" – 1:36
13. "Knights of the Underground Table" – 3:24
14. "Saga (Iron Fist)" (featuring Madcap, Merma, Mistery, Quro, Reason and Wizdm) – 7:27
15. "Clockin' Up the Damage" – 1:47
