= Brainwashed =

Brainwashed may refer to:

- Brainwashing, to affect a person's mind by using extreme mental pressure or other methods

== Film and television ==
- Brainwashed (film), a 1960 German film
- Brainwashed: Sex-Camera-Power, a 2022 American documentary film
- "Brainwashed" (Pinky and the Brain), a 1998 three-episode story arc

== Music ==
=== Albums ===
- Brainwashed (George Harrison album) or the title song, 2002
- Brainwashed (While She Sleeps album) or the title song, 2015

=== Songs ===
- "Brainwashed" (Devlin song), 2010
- "Brainwashed", by Iced Earth from Burnt Offerings, 1995
- "Brainwashed", by the Kinks from Arthur (Or the Decline and Fall of the British Empire), 1969
- "Brainwashed", by Tom MacDonald, 2021
- "Brainwashed (Call You)", by Tomcraft, 2003

== Other uses ==
- Brainwashed (website), a non-profit music publication
- Brainwashed, a 2004 nonfiction book by Ben Shapiro

== See also ==
- Brainwash (disambiguation), including uses of Brainwashing
- Brainwasher, a 2000 album by Bare Jr.
