= Overcranked =

- Genre: Punk, rock, metal
- Dates: March
- Locations: Brisbane, Australia
- Years active: 2001–2007
- Website: http://www.overcranked.com/

Overcranked was an Australian punk, rock and metal music festival presented by Rave Magazine. It was first held in 2001. The 2007 edition occurred on 24 March at RNA Showgrounds in Brisbane.

== 2007 line-up ==
The 2007 line-up was:

- Helmet
- The Butterfly Effect
- Frenzal Rhomb (Cancelled)
- God Forbid
- Horsell Common
- Sunk Loto
- 8 Foot Sativa
- Psycroptic
- Against
- The Hard-Ons
- Dreamkillers
- Terrorust
- Dawn of Azazel
- The Rivalry
- Pathogen
- Lord
- Mourning Tide
- Minus Life
- Rollerball
- Repeat Offender
- 50 Lions
- Ruins (Au)
- Dyscord
- Art Vandelay
- Western Decay
- City in Panic
- Beijing Tank
- Dead Letter Circus
- Shihad
- After The Fall
- Sakkuth (pulled pout due to sudden line up change)

== 2008 ==
Overcranked (2008) was planned for October 2008, but was cancelled.
