= Payback Records =

Australian record company

Payback Records is an Australian record company. It was founded by Nathan Lovett-Murray and Cappa Atkinson in Melbourne, Victoria and was launched in October 2008. It focuses on hip-hop music performed by indigenous people. Artists on the label include Tjimba and the Yung Warriors, Alter Egoz, Johnny Mac, Koori Boy, Young Philly, Meriki Hood, MC Antwon, DJ Deadly and Little G.

The label's first release, Mixed Tape 1, was a compilation.
