= Choose One =

Studio album by 1200 Techniques
- Released: 14 June 2002
- Recorded: 2002
- Studio: Chung King Studios
- Genres: Australian hip hop; rock; electro
- Length: 74:18
- Label: Rubber Records
- Producer: DJ Peril

1200 Techniques chronology
Infinite Styles (2001)	Choose One (2002)	Consistency Theory (2004)

Singles from Choose One
- 1. "Karma (What Goes Around)" Released: April 2002

Choose One is the debut studio album from Australian hip hop group 1200 Techniques, released in June 2002. Produced entirely by band's founder, DJ Peril, the album features a mix of contemporary hip-hop, rock and electro. It peaked at No. 20 on the ARIA Albums Chart.

The single, "Karma (What Goes Around)", samples elements of Hot Chocolate's "Brother Louie" and was featured on a "World Instruments" segment of John Safran's Music Jamboree. The track "Battlemaster" contains a widely used line from the hip hop film, Beat Street.

== Reception ==
AllMusic's Jody Macgregor rated it at three-and-a-half stars and explained "the group's guitarist Kemstar lays down a rock-solid rock riff. That unusual addition, a live rock guitarist in a hip-hop group, goes a long way towards individualizing the 1200 Techniques sound, adding an odd and sometimes surprisingly funky layer. Another thing that makes them unique is their unabashed Australian-ness."

== Track listing ==
1. "1200's Theme" - 3:11
2. "Electro Boogie Freaks" - 7:07
3. "Karma (What Goes Around)" - 4:18
4. "Since I Got It" - 3:45
5. "Rat City (Action)" - 4:43
6. "Hard As Hell" - 4:50
7. "DJ Ballbreakers Skit (Part 1)" - 1:04
8. "Battlemaster" - 5:30
9. "Cool Down" - 4:14
10. "Can't Stop" (featuring Kabba and Rusyl) - 4:04
11. "Upsidedownunder" (Featuring Z-No-Zeen) - 4:04
12. "See Me Rock" - 4:39
13. "DJ Ballbreakers Skit (Part 2)" - 0:45
14. "Anybody Out There" - 4:08
15. "Put 'Em Up" - 4:05
16. "Ready Willing and Able" - 0:41
17. "Hoe Down" - 4:48
18. "Don One" - 6:20
19. "Andiamo (Spagetti Outro)" - 2:02

Choose More Bonus Disc

1. "Cool Down" (Wika mix)
2. "Upsidedownunder" (Mack Truck mix)
3. "Sad Girl" (Cool Down original)
4. "Put 'Em Up" (Live from 'The Planet of Breaks')
5. "Cool Down" (Extended Club mix)
6. "What Goes Around Comes Around" (DJ Peril remix)
7. "Hard As Hell" (Ripping Up the Set mix)
8. "A Regal Violation #1" (DJ Regal remix)

== Charts ==
Chart (2002)	Peak position
Australian Albums (ARIA)	20

== Release history ==
Region	Date	Format	Edition(s)	Label	Catalogue
Australia	14 June 2002	CD	Standard	Rubber Records	RUB137.2
Australia	2002	2xCD	Choose One / Choose More	Rubber Records	RUB137.5
