= Hydrofunk Records =

- Founded: 1995
- Founder: DJ Katch; Dave Atkins
- Genre: Hip hop
- Country of origin: Australia
- Location: Toowong, Queensland
- Official website: http://www.hydrofunk.com.au

Hydrofunk Records is an independent Australian hip hop record label distributed by MGM. The label is home to artists such Resin Dogs and Def Wish Cast.

== History ==
Hydrofunk Records started in 1994 as a series of hip hop events to give local artists an avenue to perform.

In 1995, Hydrofunk founder DJ Katch met Dave Atkins through various live funk, jazz, and hip hop projects. Together they decided to form Hydrofunk Records in response to Brisbane's lack of outlets for underground hip hop.

In 1997, Hydrofunk released its first vinyl L.P. with Blunted Stylus's 2BLUNTED record. One year later Hydrofunk released Resin Dogs' Grinnin' which received significant airplay on both local and national radio, followed by the Volcanic Lab EP in 1998 which gained the band momentum with touring nationally. This success enabled Hydrofunk Records to secure a label distribution deal with Virgin/EMI in 1999. In 2002, Hydrofunk Records licensed its first overseas label, London's underground hip hop label, Low Life Records with artists like Rodney P, Braintax and Jehst.

In 2007, Hydrofunk created a new label, Hydropunk Records. Its first release on Hydropunk Records is Brisbane band Godnose.

== Artists ==
The following artists are currently or have previously been signed to Hydrofunk Records:

- 2 Dogs
- AYK8
- Afro Dizzi Act
- Bankrupt Billionaires
- Blunted Stylus
- BreeChBoy
- Def Wish Cast
- Calski
- Downsyde (now signed to Illusive; previously on Obese Records)
- Godnose
- Good Buddha
- Indigenoise
- Koolism (now signed to Invada Records)
- Omni Anti
- Resin Dogs
- Red Bantoo
- Rhibosome (band disbanded in 2004)
- Skam Artist
- Skin-ki-row
- Thavy Ear
- Th3 Numb3rs
- The Boy of Many Colours
- Triple Nip
- Ugly Duckling

== See also ==
- List of record labels
