= Lez Beckett =

- Also known as: Bex
- Genres: hip hop
- Occupation: Rapper

Lez Beckett is a hip hop artist. He has been a member of South West Syndicate and Cypher Duem. He won a Deadly in 2005 for Most Promising New Talent.
