= Def Wish Cast =

Australian hip-hop group

- Origin: Sydney, New South Wales, Australia
- Genres: Hip-hop, ragga
- Years active: 1989–1995, 2002–present
- Labels: Random; Hydrofunk
- Members: DefWish; Die C Sereck; DJ Murda One; Thomas Rock
- Past members: DJ Vame
- Website: Official Website

Def Wish Cast, (sometimes known as Def Wish Posse or abbreviated to DWC) are an Australian hip-hop group from Western Sydney.

== History ==
Def Wish Cast are one of the founders of Australian hip hop, "having created something localised that was revered and is now mythologized." The group also states its hip hop credentials through its lyrics, rapping that they are "always hardcore/ 'cos hardcore means true to the music." DJ Vame stated that being "true to the music" is shown by Def Wish Cast's faithfulness to the "original instruments" of hip-hop: two turntables and a microphone. Originally, Def Wish Cast was composed of MCs Simon Bottle (a.k.a. DefWish), Pablo Chiacchio (a.k.a. Die C), Paul Westgate (a.k.a. Sereck) and featured turntablism by DJ Vame (Shane Duggan).

DWC promote Australian culture by not only explicitly naming local suburbs of Sydney, but also by rapping in an Australian accent. Their distinct Australian sound helped gain the crew notoriety both locally and internationally through graffiti mags. Def Wish Cast embrace not only the music, but all elements of the hip hop culture, including graffiti art and bboying. DefWish and Sereck are shown bboying a lot in the Def Wish Cast. They can be seen bboying in Aust (Down Under Comin Upper), Saturday Night by the Sound Unlimited Posse and one of their latest releases Dun Proppa. Although Def Wish Cast is characterised by many traditional elements of hip hop, the group has combined the genre's origins in African American culture with their own local identity. Sereck has said the group respects hip hop's origins in the South Bronx and abroad but that DWC creates something that is distinctly from the Australian hip hop scene, stating, "it's our thing". For this, Def Wish Cast represents Aussie hip hop in a global market.

The cover artwork of the Mad as a Hatter EP (1992)

Def Wish Cast begun performing onstage in 1990, and they signed a record deal with Random Records in 1991. In 1992, the group released a run of 500 four track vinyl EPs, Mad As A Hatter, which featured MC DefWish's Australianised ragga style on the track "Proppa Ragga" (which later appeared on the compilation album 15.Oz Vinyl in 2004). "Proppa Ragga" was the first Australian hip hop track to receive recognition outside the country, coming in at number 2 on Norway's NRK's Hip Hop show (hosted by Tommy Tee). In 2012, a copy of Mad As A Hatter sold on eBay for A$540.

Def Wish Cast then went on to release one of the first full-length Australian hip hop albums, Knights of the Underground Table, in 1993. Only the Sound Unlimited LP A Postcard From The Edge of the Under-Side came before it, which was released on a major label, CBS Records. Def Wish Cast then independently toured Australia, becoming the first Australian hip hop group to tour nationally.

After limited commercial success, in 1995 DJ Vame moved to Melbourne, leaving the group in hiatus for almost a decade. During this period, DefWish, Die C and Sereck pursued other interests. MC DefWish concentrated on his band "The Quickness".

In 1996, Sereck examined the Sydney hip hop culture in the first Australian hip hop documentary, Basic Equipment. The documentary was made by Paul Fenech (creator of SBS' Pizza series) and narrated by Sereck. It featured MC Trey, Def Wish Cast, DJ Bonez, DJ A.S.K, Mistery and Wizdm from Brethren and more. The 28-minute program was not aired until the following year. Sereck founded a record label of the same name following the airing of the documentary, and he also united artists from Sydney's hip hop scene to form the Basic Equipment Crew. The collective includes DJ Sing, Frequency Unknown, Sleek the Elite, and DJ Vame, among others.

Def Wish Cast reunited briefly in 1997 to record and contribute the track "Hear My Raw" for the international compilation Bomb Worldwide. The album was released through the San Francisco label Bomb Records.

Due to a very small market for Australian urban music at that time, limited commercial response to their first album and the absence of DJ Vame, Def Wish Cast did not record again as a group for almost decade. Since officially re-uniting in 2002, DJ Vame has been replaced by DJ Murda One.

The following year, the group released their comeback LP The Legacy Continues..., 14 years after their debut. The lead single "Allstars" was featured in the soundtrack of the film Bra Boys.

In 2011, Def Wish Cast released a digital single and video clip for "Dun Proppa", a song from their upcoming album Evolution Machine. The same year, Knights of the Underground Table placed 91st on Triple J's "Industry List" as part of the Triple J Hottest 100 Australian Albums of All Time, 2011 poll. The "Industry List" included some of the country's top musicians and industry experts.

== Discography ==
=== Albums and EPs ===
- Mad as a Hatter - Random (1992)
- Knights of the Underground Table - Random (1993)
- The Legacy Continues... - Hydrofunk (2006)
- Evolution Machine - MGM 2010

=== Singles ===
- "A.U.S.T." - Random (1993)
- "Allstars" - Hydrofunk (2006)
- "DunProppa" - MGM&Creative Vibes (2011)
- "Forever" - MGM&Creative Vibes (2011)

=== Compilations ===
- "Hear My Roar", Bomb Worldwide - Bomb Records (1997)
- "Proppa Ragga", 15.Oz Vinyl: 15 Years of Australian Hip Hop on Vinyl - Crookneck Records (2004)
- "Allstars", Bra Boys: Music From The Film - Sony BMG (2007)
- "DunProppa", Battle of the Year
- "Daily Nightmare (1991 Demo Version)", Underground United Vol. 4 - Underground United (2022)

=== Guest appearances and contributions ===
- "Boogie Boy", DefWish & DJ Sing (Feat. Tom Thum) - Airheads Two - Australian Beats And Rhymes (2005)
- "It's Only Right", 13th Son (Feat. Sereck on backing vocals) - Airheads Two - Australian Beats And Rhymes (2005)
- "Too Damn Long", Sereck - Airheads Two - Australian Beats And Rhymes (2005)

=== Production ===
- "Wattz A Kila?", Kilawattz (DJ Vame, production) - Basic Equipment (1998)
- "The Last One", Dope Runner (DJ Vame, production) - Basic Equipment (1998)
- "Flow", Brethren (Sereck, production) - Basic Equipment (1998)
- "Nothins gonna stop me" - 13th Son (Sereck Production) (2001)
- "By The Wayside", 13th Son (Sereck, production) - Culture of Kings Volume 2 (2002)

== Award and nominations ==
=== APRA Awards ===
The APRA Awards are presented annually from by the Australasian Performing Right Association (APRA), "honouring composers and songwriters".

Year	Nominee / work	Award	Result	Ref.
2012	"Dun Proppa"	Song of the Year	Shortlisted	
