= Little G =

- Birth name: Georgina Chrisanthopoulos
- Born: 1980 or 1981 (age 43–44)
- Origin: Mildura, Victoria, Australia
- Genres: Hip hop
- Occupation(s): Rapper, actress, dancer and activist
- Labels: Payback Records

Gina Chrisanthopolous, known by her stage name Little G, is an Australian rapper, actress, dancer, and community activist.

She has performed at the Big Day Out, Songlines Music Festival and the Royal Melbourne Show and appeared in plays such as Scratchin' and DiaTribe and presented a hip-hop showcase for National Indigenous Television.
