= Kid Kenobi =

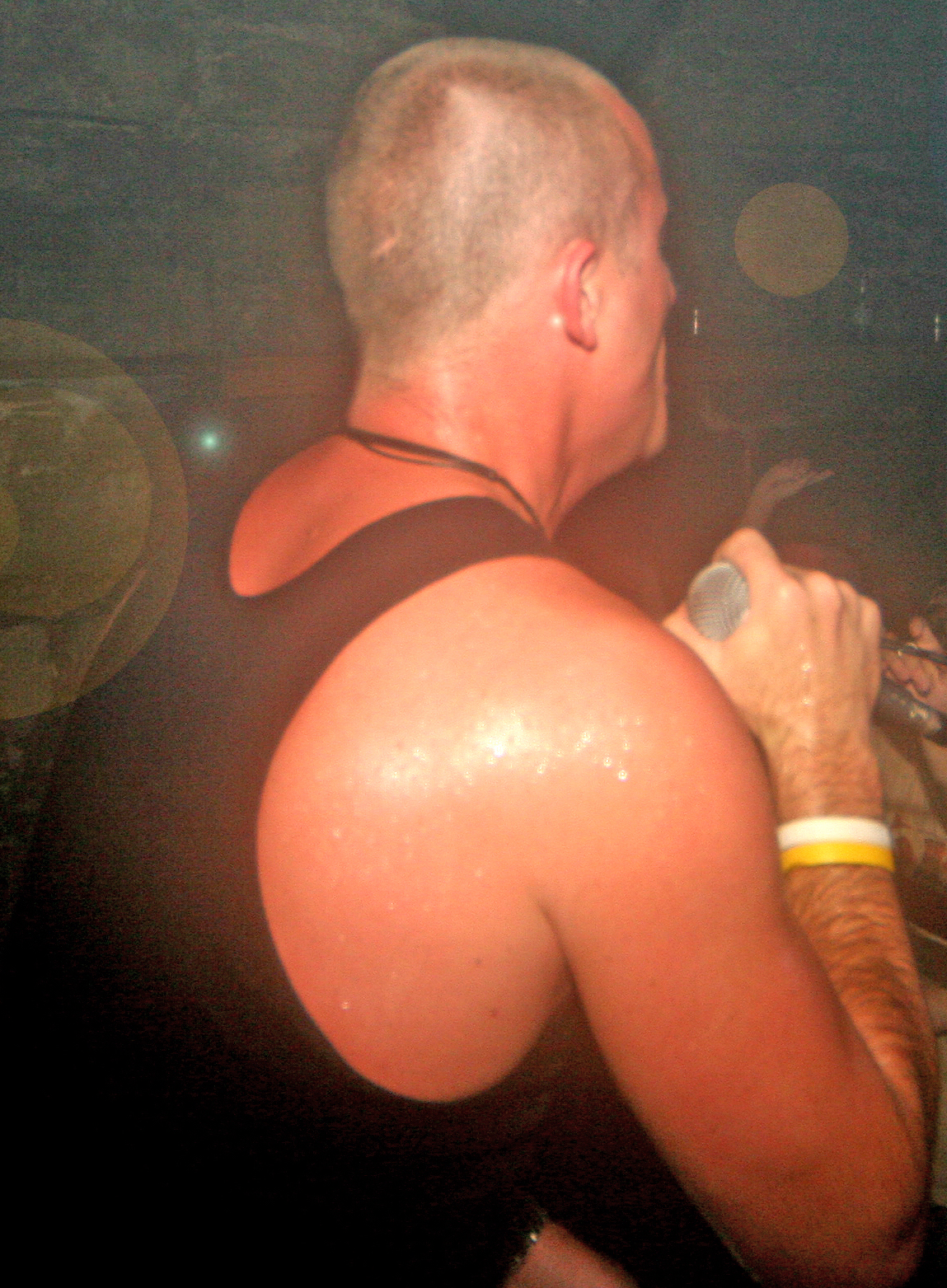
- Kid Kenobi, SugarBeat Club, July 2006

Background information
- Born: Jesse Thomas Desenberg
- Origin: Sydney, New South Wales, Australia
- Occupations: DJ; sound mixer; music journalist; dance music artist
- Instrument: Vocals
- Years active: 1996–present
- Label: Ministry of Sound Australia/EMI

Kid Kenobi or Jesse Thomas Desenberg is an Australian DJ, sound mixer, music journalist and dance music artist. Together with Hook N Sling (a.k.a. Anthony Maniscalco), he was nominated for the 2007 ARIA Award for Best Dance Release for their single, "The Bump".

== Biography ==
Jesse Thomas Desenberg started working as a DJ, Kid Kenobi, in 1996 in Sydney playing the clubs and festivals circuit. Kenobi later recalled, "after the rave culture had sort of died in the early '90s and the scene had gone back to the clubs. So it was a mix of stuff: house, techno, the tail end of big beat and trip hop and drum'n'bass obviously." By the year 2000 the local scene was still insular, one of his contemporaries was Ajax (a.k.a. Adrian Thomas), "you tended to be state-focused, or even city-focused because dance music wasn't really that big outside of the bigger cities. So in Sydney there was Sugar Ray, Phil Smart; they were the two top dogs back then. And it was me and Ajax who were kind of like the protégées I guess…" From 2003 to 2005 Kenobi was listed as No.1 DJ by InTheMix magazine's editorial staff. The staff writers later described his era, "Breaks was big business in the first few years of the awards ... [he] was arguably the genre's king, proudly flying the breakbeat flag for Australia at home and abroad."

== Discography ==
=== Remix albums ===
- Various Artists: Breaks 04: Mixed by Kid Kenobi (20 September 2004): Ministry of Sound Australia/EMI (MOSA040) AUS Comp: No. 7; Dan: No. 3
- Various Artists: Kid Kenobi Sessions (5 September 2005): Ministry of Sound Australia (MOSA049) AUS Dan: No. 6
- Various Artists: Addicted to Bass (2012): Ministry of Sound Australia (MOSCD158)

=== Remix singles ===
- Green Velvet: "La La Land (PoxyMusic vs Kid Kenobi mix)" Hussle Recordings
- Ferry Corsten: "Rock Your Body Rock (Extended/PoxyMusic vs Kid Kenobi mix) (August 2003) Hussle Recordings/Ministry of Sound Australia (HUS/MOS) AUS Club: No. 3
- Mylo: "Drop the Pressure (Kid Kenobi vs Pocket remix)" (21 February 2005): EMI (HUSSYCD5054)
- Tonite Only: "Danger! (The Bomb) (Original/Hook n Sling & Kid Kenobi mix)" (April 2006): AUS Club: No. 7
- Hook N Sling and Kid Kenobi: "The Bump (Tonite Only mix)" (21 August 2006): Hussle Recordings/EMI AUS Club: No. 10
- Krafty Kuts: "Tell Me How You Feel (Kid Kenobi vs Rouge Element / Young Punx mix)" (28 August 2006): AUS Club: 13

== Awards and nominations ==
=== ARIA Music Awards ===
The ARIA Music Awards is an annual awards ceremony that recognises excellence, innovation, and achievement across all genres of Australian music.

Year	Nominee / work	Award	Result
2007	"The Bump" (with Hook n Sling)	Best Dance Release	Nominated
