= Resin Dogs =

Australian hip hop group

- Origin: Brisbane, Queensland, Australia
- Genres: Hip hop, funk
- Years active: 1996–present
- Labels: Hydrofunk
- Members: DJ Katch; Dave Atkins
- Past members: Chris Bosley; Geoff Boardman
- Website: Resin Dogs

Resin Dogs is an Australian hip hop group, formed in Brisbane, Queensland in 1996 based around the founding trio of DJ Katch (Andrew Garvie), producer Blunted Stylus (Geoff Boardman), and drummer, Dave "Acosta" Atkins. The group is a loosely structured cut-and-paste sample collective featuring live instruments and elements of hip hop via turntables, samplers, and guest MCs to create all forms of ritual dance sounds. Resin Dogs currently consist of Dave Atkins, DJ Katch, Dennis Kudelka, Jonothan Bolt and Tony McCall (both also of Final Days of Autumn).

Collaborators with the band include; MC DNO ("Shin Ki Row", "Decipher"), percussionist Peter Neville ("Trout Fishing in Quebec"), Lazy Grey, DJ Ransom (of Mnemonic Ascent), Ben Ely (of Regurgitator), Dialectrix, Kel On Earth, N'fa Forster-Jones (a.k.a. Nfamas) (1200 Techniques), Hau Latukefu (a.k.a. Hau) (Koolism), Abstract Rude (ATU) of Haiku D'Etat (US), Robert Reed (of Trouble Funk) (US), Kenny Dope (US), Super Dense Child (UK), The Pharcyde (US), Jungle Brothers (US), Mad Doctor X (UK), Spikey Tee (UK), Brad Baloo (The Nextmen) (UK), Mystro (Natural Born Spitter) (UK), YungGun, Mc Wrec (London Electricity), Demolition Man, BluRum13 (Canada).

== Biography ==
The Resin Dogs were formed in 1996, releasing their debut EP, Grinnin', on their own label, Hydrofunk, in 1997. This was followed by subsequent EPs, Volcanic Lab (1998) and Daily Trouble (2000), with the track, "Say Yeah", receiving airplay on Triple J making its way up the Australian Independent Records (AIR) charts.

In 2000 Resin Dogs signed a distribution deal with Virgin Records/EMI for their record label, Hydrofunk, and released their debut album, Grand Theft Audio. This was followed by a second EP, Live Like Dogs (2002). During the recording of their second album, two singles were released "Set It Off", featuring underground artist Abstract Rude from the USA, and "Take Off" with Sydney's Good Buddha on vocals.

In 2003 they released the follow-up, Hi Fidelity Dirt (21 September 2003), also on Hydrofunk. The band's two albums continue to attract strong sales and widespread praise from critics and fans. Vinyl sales of Grand Theft Audio have increased steadily on an annual basis (with over 29,000 copies sold). After their distribution deal with Virgin lapsed, they signed a deal with MGM.

Resin Dogs have won three Australian Dance Music Awards – Best Hip Hop Act (2001) and two Best Live Act (2002, 2003). and took out a quarter final spot in the acclaimed International Song Writers Competition with their tune "Fine Mess" Featuring Yungun (UK) in 2007.

Resin Dogs have performed at almost every major Australian festival, including Livid, Homebake Meredith, Woodford, East Coast Blues & Roots Music Festival, Falls Festival, and at the Big Day Out for seven years. Organisers of Meredith Music Festival said of Resin Dogs performance “…the best 90 minutes of live groove ever seen in the bush". In 2004 and 2005 the Resin Dogs performed concerts across Australia, New Zealand, Japan, UK and Europe (including the Sziget Festival, Hungary, and at the Colours of Ostrava in the Czech Republic).

An invitation from The Black Eyed Peas saw Resin Dogs support the band on their Australian tour in October 2004. Resin Dogs also made an appearance at the world's largest WOMAD Festival at Reading in England and had a sell-out show at Cargo, the popular London club.

In 2005, Electronic Arts featured one of the group's songs, "Definition", in the 2006 FIFA World Cup video game. "Definition" was released as an EP/Single in February 2006 and features ARIA winning MC Hau (Koolism), MC Mystro (Low Life) and The Pharcyde.

2007 saw the release of the Resin Dogs' third studio album, More (3 November 2007) on the Hydrofunk label, distributed by MGM. The album was co-produced by Brad Baloo (The Nextmen), with contributions from Abstract Rude (US), Aceyalone, Mikah 9, and Demolition Man (UK). The album was Triple J's 'feature album' in December 2007 with the first track lifted from the album, "Coming with the Sound", receiving airplay on Triple J, Nova (Brisbane) and community radio stations across Australia.

In 2009 Dave Atkins formally joined Wolfmother as the band's new drummer. The band performed at two benefit concerts to be held in Melbourne and Sydney on 14 March for Sound Relief, supporting victims of the Victorian bushfires. The new lineup began recording its first album in March 2009.

In July 2009 the band's album More was released in Europe, receiving great reviews from critics and fans alike.

== Discography ==
=== Studio albums ===
List of studio albums, with selected details and chart positions
Title	Details	Peak chart positions
Title	Details	AUS
Grand Theft Audio	Released: 24 August 2000; Label: Hydrofunk; Format: CD	18
Hi Fidelity Dirt	Released: 22 September 2003; Label: Hydrofunk (HF34); Format: CD, LP	68
More	Released: 3 November 2007; Label: Hydrofunk (HF48); Format: 2xCD, LP, DD	—

=== Live albums ===
Title	Details
Live Like Dogs	Released: 2001; Label: Hydrofunk (HF17); Format: CD

=== Remix albums ===
Title	Details
More or Less	Released: 29 November 2008; Label: Hydrofunk (HF49); Format: CD

=== Extended plays ===
Title	Details
Grinnin	Released: 1997; Label: Hydrofunk; Format: CD
From the Volcanic Lab	Released: 1998; Label: Hydrofunk (HF05); Format: CD
Definition	Released: 3 February 2006; Label: Hydrofunk (HF45); Format: CD, DD
The Beats from Down Under	Released: 2013; Label: Hydrofunk (HF56); Format: CD, DD

=== Singles ===
List of singles, with selected chart positions
Title	Year	Peak chart positions	Album
Title	Year	AUS	Album
"Gimme a Break"	2000	—	Grand Theft Audio
"Daily Trouble"/"Rock the Record"	2000	92	Grand Theft Audio
"Hardgroove 2001"	2001	92	Grand Theft Audio
"Set It Off"	2002	95	Hi Fidelity Dirt
"Take Off"	2003	—	Hi Fidelity Dirt
"Gunshot"	2004	—	Hi Fidelity Dirt
"She's Gone"	2005	—	Non-album single
"Definition"	2006	—	Definition
"Peace and Love" (featuring Demolition Man)	2009	—	More or Less
"Still the Beat"	2013	—	The Beats from Down Under

== Awards and nominations ==
=== AIR Awards ===
The Australian Independent Record Awards (commonly known informally as AIR Awards) is an annual awards night to recognise, promote and celebrate the success of Australia's Independent Music sector. (The commenced in 2006)

Year	Nominee / work	Award	Result
2008	More	Best Independent Hip Hop Album	Nominated

=== Queensland Music Awards ===
The Queensland Music Awards (previously known as Q Song Awards) are annual awards celebrating Queensland, Australia's brightest emerging artists and established legends. They commenced in 2006.

Year	Nominee / work	Award	Result (wins only)
2019	"Pack Your Bags"	Hip Hop / Rap Song of the Year	Won
