= N'fa =

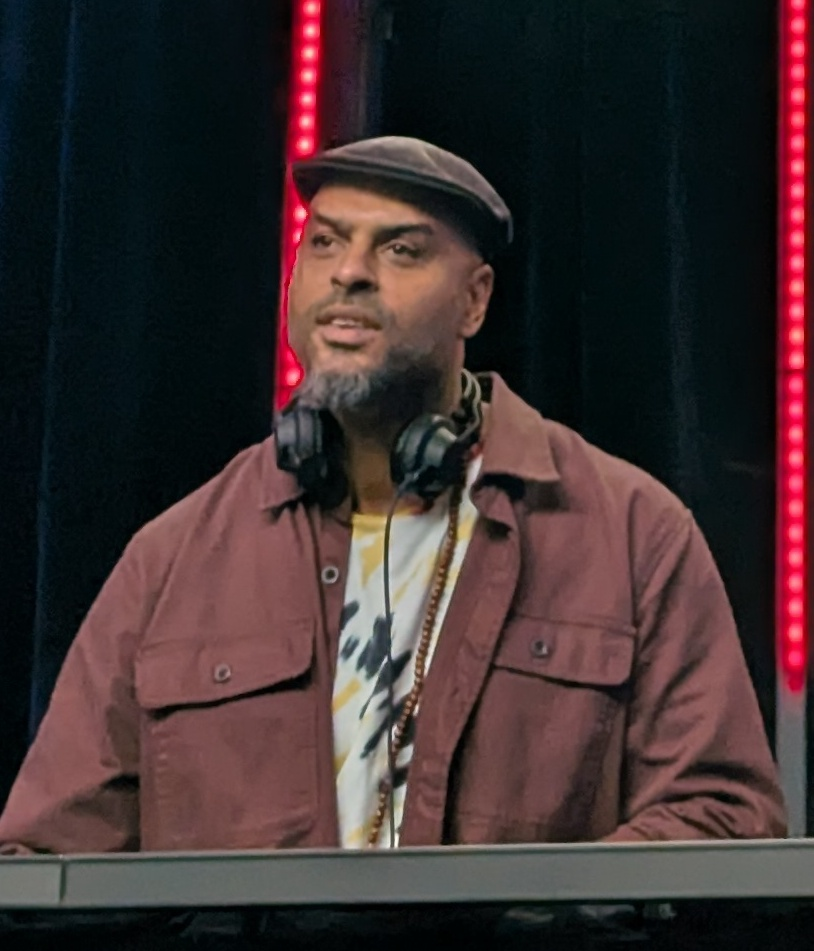
- N'fa in 2025 at Rising

Background information
- Also known as: N'fa Jones
- Born: N'fa Deynde Jo Jo Forster-Jones; 21 March 1979 (age 47); London, England
- Origin: Perth, Western Australia, Australia
- Genres: Hip hop; electronic; future soul
- Occupation: Rapper
- Years active: 1997-current
- Labels: Inertia Recordings, Rubber Records, The Ayems, House of Beige
- Website: nfajones.com

N'fa (born N'fa Deynde Jo Jo Forster-Jones; also known as N'fa Jones, 21 March 1979) is a British-born African Australian hip hop recording artist. He was born in London, but raised in Perth, Western Australia, and is best known as the frontman for 1200 Techniques. Forster-Jones was a nationally ranked 110m hurdler and placed third at the 2001 and 2002 Australian Championships, and fourth in the 2000 Olympic trials. His personal best recorded time was 14.08s (wind: +1.8) set in Brisbane on 25 March 2001, though clocked 13.91 "unofficial" in Auckland's trans-Tasman test meet in 2001.

== Early life ==
N'fa was born in London to mother Michela Johnson, from Western Australia, and father, Quashie Forster-Jones, a Sierra Leone Creole. Brought up in suburban Perth, he met Heath Ledger at Guildford Grammar School and remained friends until the actor's death in 2008. At a young age, Forster-Jones also dabbled in acting and appeared as a genie in a Tim Tam commercial and played a small role in the film Queen of the Damned – a 2002 film adaptation of the third novel of Anne Rice's, starring Aaliyah and Stuart Townsend.

== Musical career ==
=== 1997–2005: 1200 Techniques ===
1200 Techniques were formed in 1997—the band originally included N'fa and his brother Kabba. Kabba left the band in 1998, when he moved to the United Kingdom. As of 2006, Forster-Jones has shipped over 50,000 albums with 1200 Techniques alone.

=== 2006–present: Solo work ===
In 2006, N'fa signed with Inertia Recordings and released his debut album Cause an Effect. Heath Ledger conceived and directed two video clips for single "Seduction Is Evil", and the title track, with the latter being edited by Matt Amato from Amato and Ledger's production company, The Masses.

In 2011, N'fa became known as N'fa Jones with the release of the collaborative single "Wayooy" featuring Roots Manuva and M-Phazes, the lead single from his EP "Babylondon" on Australian Independent Label Rubber Records, who he originally signed to with Hip Hop act 1200 Techniques.

In 2018, he founded a new afro-future-hip hop group called Cool Out Sun with producer Sensible J.

== Discography ==
=== Albums ===
Title	Details
Cause an Effect	Released: July 2006; Label: Inertia Recordings (IR5215CD)
Black + White Noise	Released: 2014; Label: The Ayems (88843048222)

=== Extended plays ===
Title	Details	Peak chart positions
Title	Details	AUS
First Step	Released: May 2006; Label: Inertia Recordings (IR2507CD)	70
Brain Wash EP	Released: 2008; Label: Rubber Records (RUB247)	—

=== Collaborations ===
- "Stage Presence" Koolism featuring BVA (Mnemonic Ascent) and N'fa (credited as N'famas) on the album Random Thoughts (2004)
- "Move Up" by Resin Dogs on the album More (2007)
- "Twist the Kids" by Daedelus on the album Love to Make Make Music To (2008)
- "Crazy" by Diafrix on the album Concrete Jungle (2009)
- "Keep Runnin" by M-Phazes on the album Good Gracious (2010)
- "Let It Go" & "Grey Skies Blue" by Nick Thayer on the album Just Let It Go (2010)
- "Bali Party" by Drapht (featuring N'fa) on the album The Life of Riley (2011)
- "Satellite Disco" on the self-titled album by Bitrok (2011)
- "Hope You Don't Mind" by 360 on the album Falling & Flying (2011)
- "Like Boom" by Nick Thayer featuring Wizard Sleeve, N'fa & Kaba Jones on the EP Like Boom (2012)
- "What Props Ya Got" by Nick Thayer featuring N'fa on the EP Like Boom (2012)
- "1990's" by Drapht (featuring N'fa Jones, Ta-Ku & Joyride) (2012)

== See also ==
- 1200 Techniques
