= Australian hip-hop =

Music genre

- Stylistic origins: Hip-hop; dembow; funk; jazz; R&B; soul; dub; toasting; riddim; rap rock; post-punk; big beat; pop rap
- Cultural origins: Early 1980s, Australia

Australian hip-hop traces its origins to the early 1980s and was initially largely inspired by hip-hop and other urban musical genres from the United States. As the form matured, Australian hip-hop has become a commercially viable style of music that is no longer restricted to the creative underground, with artists such as ONEFOUR, Hilltop Hoods, Kerser and Bliss n Eso having achieved notable fame. Australian hip-hop is still primarily released through independent record labels, which are often owned and operated by the artists themselves. Despite its genesis as an offshoot of American hip-hop, Australian hip-hop has developed a distinct personality that reflects its evolution as an Australian musical style. Since the inception of the Australian hip-hop scene, Australian Aboriginals have played a prominent role.

== History ==
=== Early years (1980s) ===
In 1982, the music video for Malcolm McLaren's track, "Buffalo Gals", was shown on the Australian television music show Sound Unlimited. The music show was broadcast on Network Seven. The clip was staged in a Manhattan basketball court and featured images of graffiti and break dancers. The video left an impression on Australian teenagers, who began to copy the dancers' moves.

The first Australian hip-hop record released was "16 Tons" / "Humber Mania Time" by Mighty Big Crime via Virgin Records and Criteria Productions in 1987 (Catalogue number VOZC 026). The Melbourne-based duo (Gumpy Phillips and Tricky J a.k.a. Justin Lodge) soon disbanded. In 1991, both were members of flower power group Freaked Out Flower Children.

Gerry Bloustein wrote in the book Musical Visions that Blaze claimed the first "true hip hop" release was "Combined Talent" / "My Destiny" in 1988 by Just Us (consisting of Maltese DJ Case and Mentor).

In 1988, the first compilation of Australian rap, Down Under by Law (Virgin), was released. It included tracks by Westside Posse, Mighty Big Crime, Swoop, Sharline and Fly Girl 3.

Two Western Australian hip-hop bands, Def Threat and Gangstarr, (not related to American hip-hop duo Gang Starr) both released recordings in 1987. The Def Threat's EP, Girls Never learn, reached No. 4 in the WA Independent music charts. Def Threat played a number of gigs over the next 12 months and then disbanded. Gangstarr survived for a few more years.

=== Major label releases (1990s) ===
In the late 1980s, Sound Unlimited Posse signed with Sony Music, thereby becoming the first Australian hip-hop group signed on to a major record label. In 1992, they released the first major-label Australian hip-hop album titled A Postcard from the Edge of the Under-side.

In 1991, a 16-year-old Sydney-based solo artist named KIC was signed to Columbia/SME Records. His first single, "Bring Me On", was popular in Australia, Singapore, and Hong Kong. Also in 1992, independent label company Random Records released Def Wish Cast's album Knights of the Underground Table. After 1992, independent CDs and tapes were released by various artists, primarily from the western suburbs of Sydney, a largely immigrant-populated area largely known as a working class, underprivileged, and crime-ridden area.

MC Opi who was a dancehall artist, who co-produced with Jaslyn Hall, Australian Broadcasting Corporation Triple J and Womadelaide producer, the 1991 Australian Broadcasting Corporation radio documentary 'Women on the Rhyme' the first ABC radio documentary about Australian female dancehall and hip-hop artists. This documentary featured interviews with Charlene (Def Wish Cast), No.1 Jamaican & US female Dancehall artist Shelly Thunder, New Zealand Hip Hop Group Moana and the Moahunters, Sydney Hip Hop Artist RapAttack and others.

=== Millennial era (2000s) ===
The Melbourne hip-hop group 1200 Techniques was formed in 1997 by "old-school" 1980s B-boy/aerosol artist DJ Peril (founding member of Melbourne hip-hop crew Island Boys).The group consisted of DJ Peril on production, turntables, and percussion; his brother Kem(Kemstar) on guitar; and N'fa on vocals. They released an EP in 2001 called Infinite Styles with the independent label company Rubber Records. 1200 Techniques later released one of the first hip-hop crossover hits, a track called "Karma" (from the album Choose One). The song spawned the first ARIA Award for a hip-hop act in Australia, even before there was a hip-hop category. Additionally "Karma" won Michael Gracey an ARIA in the same year for Best Video. In 2003, the band released the first Australian hip-hop DVD titled One Time Live, which featured the band's music videos, live footage and two short documentaries. Their second album, Consistency Theory, was released in 2004.

Two of the first major independent Australian hip-hop labels were founded during this era; Obese Records in Melbourne, founded by Pegz (whose first release was Reason's Solid in 200), and Elefant Traks in Sydney, founded by Kenny Sabir (p.k.a. Traksewt).

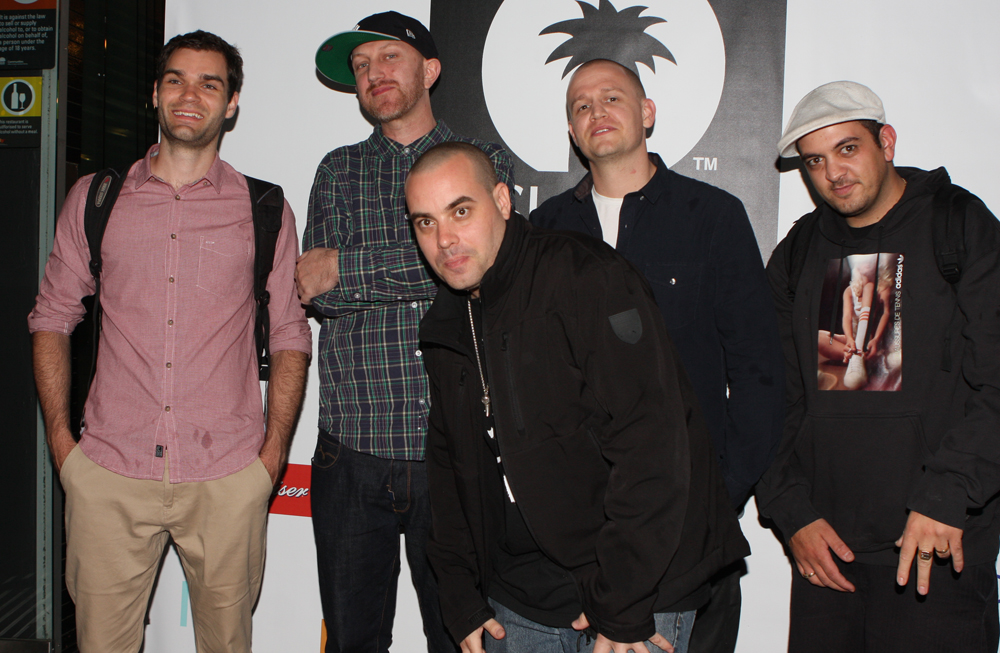
Hilltop Hoods, an Australian hip-hop group, has been awarded several ARIA Music Awards.

By the early 2000s, the Australian Record Industry Association (ARIA) began to recognise the growing interest in hip-hop in Australia. In 2004, ARIA introduced a new category in its annual awards: Best Urban Album (R&B, hip-hop, soul, funk, reggae and dancehall). The inaugural award was won by Koolism for their album, Part 3 - Random Thoughts. Koolism DJ Danielsan dedicated the award to the "Australian hip-hop community" and exclaimed: "Be yourselves, keep it real, enough of that American wannabe trash". For the ARIA Music Awards of 2019, new categories of awards were created for Best Hip Hop Release and Best Soul/R&B Release, which were previously combined in the Best Urban Release category.

At the 2006 and 2007 ARIA Awards, the Urban award was won by Hilltop Hoods for its albums The Hard Road and The Hard Road: Restrung, respectively. The Hard Road also became the first Australian hip-hop album to rank number 1 on the ARIA Charts in 2006. Other artists who have won the award include Bliss n Eso, for their album Flying Colours, and Melbourne artist Illy, for his album Bring it Back, released on the Obese Records label.

Australian hip-hop artists have also received international recognition, with The Kid Laroi being one of the few Australian rappers to achieve mainstream success worldwide. Hilltop Hoods appeared on US hip-hop group CunninLynguists' 2009 album, Strange Journey Volume One, on the song "Nothing But Strangeness". In October 2014, Australian artist K21 appeared on a song, titled "Pas rentable", by French hip-hop artist LinkRust.

There are very few women in the Australian hip-hop scene, with Layla, A-Love and Sampa the Great being the few notable examples.

== Style and influences ==
Australian hip-hop artists are strongly influenced by African American and Latino rappers from the US, and continue to incorporate such influences into their music. Australian artists, however, still utilise an authentic and unique style in their own music. Like many hip-hop scenes outside the US, some Australian hip-hop artists and groups like TZU, Butterfingers, Illzilla and The Herd have been influenced by funk, jazz, dembow, rock, blues, country, and roots and have also incorporated live instruments into their sound. Indigenous Australian culture is also a strong influence for many hip-hop artists.

While hip-hop artists in the US are predominantly African American, many Australian hip-hop artists are of Anglo heritage. Numerous Australian hip-hop artists, including N'fa, Remi, Sampa the Great, Diafrix, Tkay Maidza, Miracle, Vida Sunshyne, KillaQueenz, are of African descent, which has influenced their music.

== DJs ==
Turntablists and hip-hop DJs have played a pivotal role in the growth of Australian hip-hop, shaping live performances, battle culture, and recorded output. These artists have produced mixtapes, DJ tools, break records, and remixes that have been widely circulated among both Australian and international DJs.

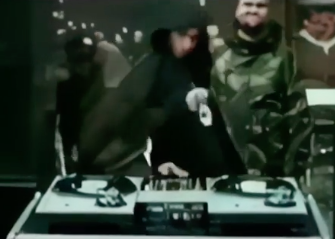
DJ Bonez performing on turntables alongside in the video for "Certified" featuring Funkoars, taken from the album Roll Call (right: Briggs)

Notable among them is DJ Bonez, active since the mid-1990s and described as being at the forefront of Australian DJ'ing culture. Bonez has produced battle records tailored for club DJs and turntablists (trick DJ's), as well as remix records and party anthems that became staples for club DJs and competitive DJs via DMC and ITF international competitions. In 1999, DJ Bonez and DJ ASK released Raiders of the Lost Crate, regarded as the first Australian battle record catered for DJs; DJ Bonez then continued to release notable titles including Bone Breaks – Australasian Dragon Edition. He is also regarded as one of the few Australian hip-hop DJs to have released full albums featuring other artists, most notably on his 2007 release Roll Call, a practice he continues to this day.

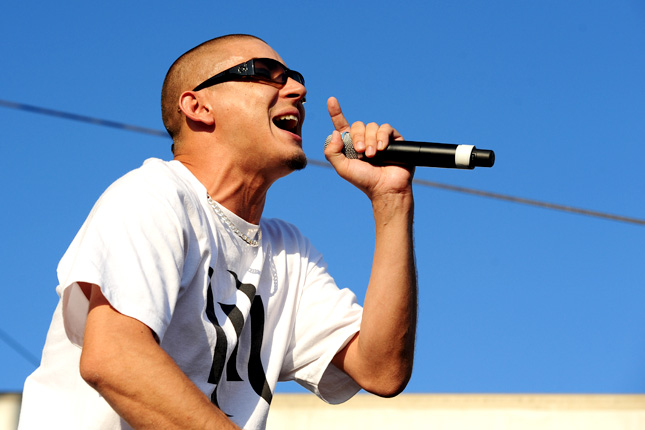
Bliss n Eso consists of an American and two Australians. According to Bliss, "When I [moved] to Australia [in 1992], I met Eso and he was the only guy at my school into hip-hop. It was so scarce you'd be lucky to find a hip-hop record in a store let alone a whole section." Eso is seen here performing in 2011.

=== Indigenous Australian Hip-Hop ===
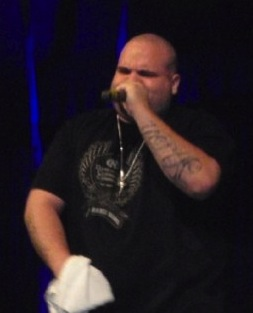
Briggs has the name of his Indigenous tribe, the Yorta Yorta people, tattooed on his forearms "so every time I rock the mic people know I'm representing".

Since the early 1980s, many indigenous crews have used hip-hop as an outlet to vent their frustration against racial injustice and discrimination. Though not at the forefront of the Australian hip-hop scene, Aboriginal rappers such as Brothablack, the South West Syndicate, Local Knowledge, Lez Beckett and the Native Ryme Syndicate produce songs that address the cultural situation of Indigenous Australians. One of their musical influences is the American hip-hop group, Public Enemy.

Munkimuk works on community-based educational hip-hop projects around Australia, such as 1999's Desert Rap, conducted with Brothablack from South West Syndicate and Morganics. The Desert Rap project was organised with Tony Collins from Triple J, which made an ABC TV documentary. Munkimuk also hosts a nationally syndicated weekly radio program called "Indij Hip Hop Show", which is produced by Koori Radio in Sydney.

Briggs, a Yorta Yorta man from the rural location of Shepparton, became a prominent feature of the Australian hip-hop scene since he began his career as an independent artist in 2005. In August 2014, he released his sophomore studio album, Sheplife, on the Golden Era Records label, owned by Hilltop Hoods. As of 2012, Briggs has been the recipient of two Deadly Awards nominations and received the "Best New Talent" award at the 2014 National Indigenous Music Awards (NIMA).

Indigenous producer and MC Daniel Rankine (Trials), of the Adelaide trio Funkoars and Golden Era Records, also releases his own work, including occasional solo work. Rankine's production credits include Drapht, Vents, Reason, Cross Bred Mongrels and K21, while he has provided guest verses for Purpose, Hilltop Hoods, and the Golden Era mixtapes. Trials and Briggs performed together at the "Beat The Drum" event for the Triple J Radio station on 16 January 2015, and released their debut album as the group A.B. Original, titled Reclaim Australia, in 2016.

=== American influence ===
U.S. artists cited as key inspirations of Australian hip-hop artists include Public Enemy, A Tribe Called Quest, and Nas. Following the release of Drinking From The Sun in 2012, Hilltop Hoods included Organized Konfusion, Kraz, and De La Soul in its ideal festival line-up.

In Australia, dance moves associated with hip-hop, such as krumping, footworking, locking, and popping, have drawn public interest to hip-hop and contributed to its dynamic popularity. However, these dance moves have been criticised as not being original and a sign that Australia suffers from a lack of its own hip-hop identity.

=== United Kingdom influence ===
In more recent years (2000s onwards), Australian hip-hop has seen a strong emergence of UK genres such as grime and Afrobeats. Although these genres have been around for years, their worldwide popularity and acceptance in the mainstream is relatively new. The genre of "Australian grime" has been marked by viral artists like HAZRD. Adelaide-based producer Strict Face hosted his own show on the now-defunct London's Radar Radio.

=== Drill music ===
An off-shoot of the drill music scene developed in Australia in the late 2010s, but did not catch 'mainstream' attention until 2017-2018. Inspired by UK drill, Onefour quickly rose in prominence in 2019 after a series of singles. The Samoan Australian group from Mount Druitt was recognised as the first drill group in Australia according to Vice.

=== Gutter rap ===
Completely distinguishing itself from most Australian hip-hop at the time, which rapped about middle-class lifestyle and issues (such as breakups, skating, going to the RSL), a new scene originating from Australia's infamous Housing Commission estates began emerging in the late 2000s called Gutter rap (sometimes known as Lad rap). Gutter rap artists such as Campbelltown's Kerser, Hurstville's Skeamo and Nter, and Blacktown's Fortay, primarily rap about Australian Lower-class lifestyle and issues (such as crime, drug addictions, financial struggles), similar to traditional American Gangsta rap, which resulted it in being branded an Australian version of the American music genre. Unlike most other Australian hip-hop scenes, which have proper mainstream presence and support, gutter rap remains underground on the internet, but that didn't stop artists from the genre gaining mainstream recognition and success, an example being Kerser's second album No Rest for the Sickest reaching No. 15 on the ARIA albums chart.

=== Australian identity ===
Although hip-hop originated in the US, some Australian rappers see their hip-hop scene as having its own unique character. Dialectrix has described it as a "mongrel mutation" of Afrocentric and Australian culture. According to the lyrics of Def Wish Cast, it is "down under, comin' up".

Australian hip-hop has been localised with the introduction of aspects such as the Australian accent, Australian slang, political views, and references to localities and matters of Australian cultural identity. The lyrics of early Western Sydney artists like 046, Def Wish Cast, and the White Boys represent the process of localising Australian hip-hop. Additionally, the non-Anglo immigrants of these areas were attracted to hip-hop because it tackles the theme of racial opposition, as in African American and Chicano hip-hop. Australian hip-hop has been described as rich with Australian character, but also as inspirational for immigrants, providing "a voice and a purpose for those making their home anew in Australia". For example, Diafrix use migrant experiences in some of their songs, although this is not their main focus.

Numerous Australian hip-hop artists have expressed concern that sections of Australia's hip-hop fan base seem to espouse a "redneck" mentality that is ignorant of the culture's international influences. In a 2009 interview, Cross Bred Mongrels member Flak explained: "I don't go for that. [Only listening to Australian hip-hop] I think that is a little narrow-minded. If it is dope hip-hop, it is dope hip-hop. If it is from Germany, Japan or Compton, and it is dope, I go for it." Over time, Australian hip-hop diversified, absorbing influences from New Zealand, the United Kingdom and the Caribbean. For example, Def Wish described his style as influenced by reggae from London, rather than North American rap, while also acknowledging Afro-Caribbean roots of that scene.

Kamaludeen Mohamed Nasir's book, Globalized Muslim Youth in the Asia Pacific: Popular Culture in Singapore and Sydney discusses how Muslim hip-hoppers like Matuse and The Brothahood have added their voices to what it means to be Australian. In their songs, The Brothahood talks about "their piety in the face of everyday life in Australia post-September 11", while in Matuse's track, "Sydney vs Everybody", he raps about "being singled out by a section of white Australia for his ethnic background rather than his lyrical skills".

== Media ==
=== Record labels ===
- Obese Records—founded by Ollie Bobit in 1995 and owned by Pegz from 2002, went defunct 2016; artists included Thundamentals, Illy, Dialectrix, Kerser and M-Phazes.
- Elefant Traks— founded in 1998 by Traksewt, went defunct in 2024; artists included Urthboy, The Herd Astronomy Class, Hermitude, Horrorshow and Joelistics.
- Golden Era Records—a label established by Hilltop Hoods in 2008; artists include Hilltop Hoods, Vents, Funkoars and Briggs.
- Hydrofunk Records—run by members of the Resin Dogs; artists include Resin Dogs and Def Wish Cast.
- Illusive Sounds—Melbourne-based recording label formed in February 2003; artists include Bliss n Eso, Downsyde, Diafrix, Weapon X and Ken Hell.
- Payback Records—Melbourne-based label founded by Nathan Lovett-Murray and Cappa Atkinson. Artists include Tjimba and the Yung Warriors, Little G and Mr Morggs.
- Unda K9 Records—established in Sydney, founded by Lui in 2002; artists include Bukkcity, Tycotic, 13th Son, Syntax, DirtBox Kings, Herb and DJ Crusador.

=== Radio ===
Radio, particularly community radio, plays a significant role in the dissemination of hip-hop within Australia. Additionally, the Australian Government funds projects, such as the Australian Music Radio Airplay Project (AMRAP), which seeks to promote Australian music nationwide. 3RRR was the first radio station to present an international hip-hop act to the city—Run-D.M.C.'s 1987 Australian tour—and it highlighted international hip-hop culture as well as the local scene.

- 3MDR (97.1FM): "The Bourne Collective" hosted by Bastian Killjoy

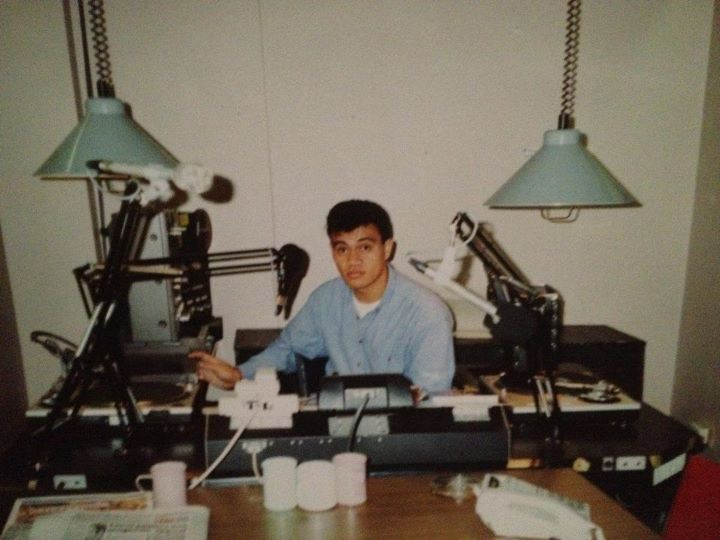
Rob Farley on 3RRR's "Wheels of Steel"

- 3RRR: "Hood Pass" hosted by Carlos Turner and Rob Steezy
- Triple J: "Hip Hop Show" hosted by Hau Latukefu
- Edge 96.1 (96.1 FM): "K-Sera & The Dirty Dozen" hosted by K-Sera
- 2SER (107.3FM): "Hardcore Classic" hosted by Thomas Rock, Ran-Dee and Raine Supreme
- 4ZZZ (102.1 FM): "Phat Tape" hosted by DJ Katch, DJ Fib, Frenzie, Chubba Dubbed, Complex, Dj Dcide and Seany B. Just 2 Def hosted by Jigzaw and Busy B
- Three D Radio (93.7FM): "Hazy Tones" hosted by Anders; "Episodes in Space" hosted by Sam & TimeSpace
- Kiss FM Australia (87.6–88.0FM): "StrictlyOZ HipHop Show" hosted by DJ Cook & Big Dip + Lil Marc.
- Fresh 92.7: "The Lesson" hosted by DJ Sanchez & Lotek1200 + (Lesson Crew) Sam, Dan, DJ Cal Haslam, Apollo & Ckur. Currently Hosted By Rockbiz and Baelz.
- RTRFM (92.1FM): "Down Underground" hosted by Nick Sweepah; "Full Frequency" (Monday and Friday) hosted by Micah and Philly Blunt (Monday) and Rok Riley (Friday)
- Radio Skid Row (88.9FM): "Local Flows" hosted by riverkid
- SYN (90.7FM): "Hip Hop Night" hosted by Christopher Palmer which included "StrictlyOZ HopHop show" from 2009 to 2010
- 2GLF: "Shots and Hits" hosted by Adam Spinz
- 2RRR (88.5FM): "The Funk Soul Brother Show" hosted by DJ Swanrock and "Hippa To Da Hoppa" hosted by Lachie Hilder

=== Television ===
The first appearance of an Australian hip-hop act on Australian television was in November 1988, when Skippy The Butcher performed live on the ABC's "The Factory" during the Run DMC tour. The first Australian hip-hop documentary, Basic Equipment, was made in 1996 and released in 1997. Narrated by Paul Westgate (a.k.a. Sereck) from Def Wish Cast, the documentary examined the Sydney hip-hop culture. It was created by Paul Fenech (creator of SBS' Pizza series) and featured artists such as MC Trey, Def Wish Cast, DJ Bonez, DJ Ask.

During the 1990s, SBS TV's MC Tee Vee, the first Australian dance music show became a hit. In 1992, following an invitation from Annette Shun Wah from the alternative arts show, The Noise, MC Opi became the first hip-hop artist to become a reporter and assistant producer for MC Tee Vee. MC Tee Vee is notable for being the first national Australian music program dedicated to dance, rap and house music.

In August 2006, the ABC program Compass showed a documentary entitled The Mistery of Hip Hop, which explored the cultural movement and popularity of hip-hop in Australia. The film followed one of the "founding fathers" of the Sydney hip-hop scene Matthew "Mistery" Peet. Mistery works full-time as graffiti artist and is also emcee/rapper in the group Brethren. The 28-minute documentary looked at the "four elements of hip-hop": breakdancing, DJing, rapping, and graffiti. It features interviews with the then-host of Triple J's hip-hop show Maya Jupiter, and the other half of Brethren: Wizdm and DJ Kool Herc.

In December 2007, ABC Television aired the documentary Words from the City, which includes interviews with a number of high-profile Australian hip-hop artists, including: Hilltop Hoods, Koolism, Downsyde, TZU, MC Layla, Bliss n Eso, MC Trey, Wire MC, and Jupiter.

Starting in 2018 "The Lesson TV" or "LSN TV" was an Australian Hip-Hop music TV show akin to MTV, that aired on C44, C31 & WTV. The show was derived from The Lesson 92.7 Radio show, Aiming to showcase Australia's diversity and cultural significance. With its mix of interviews, performances and discussions. The show provided insight into various aspects of hip-hop, from established artists to emerging talents. While it may no longer be on the air, The Lesson TV left a lasting impact on the Australian Hip-Hop community at its ground level.

=== Film ===
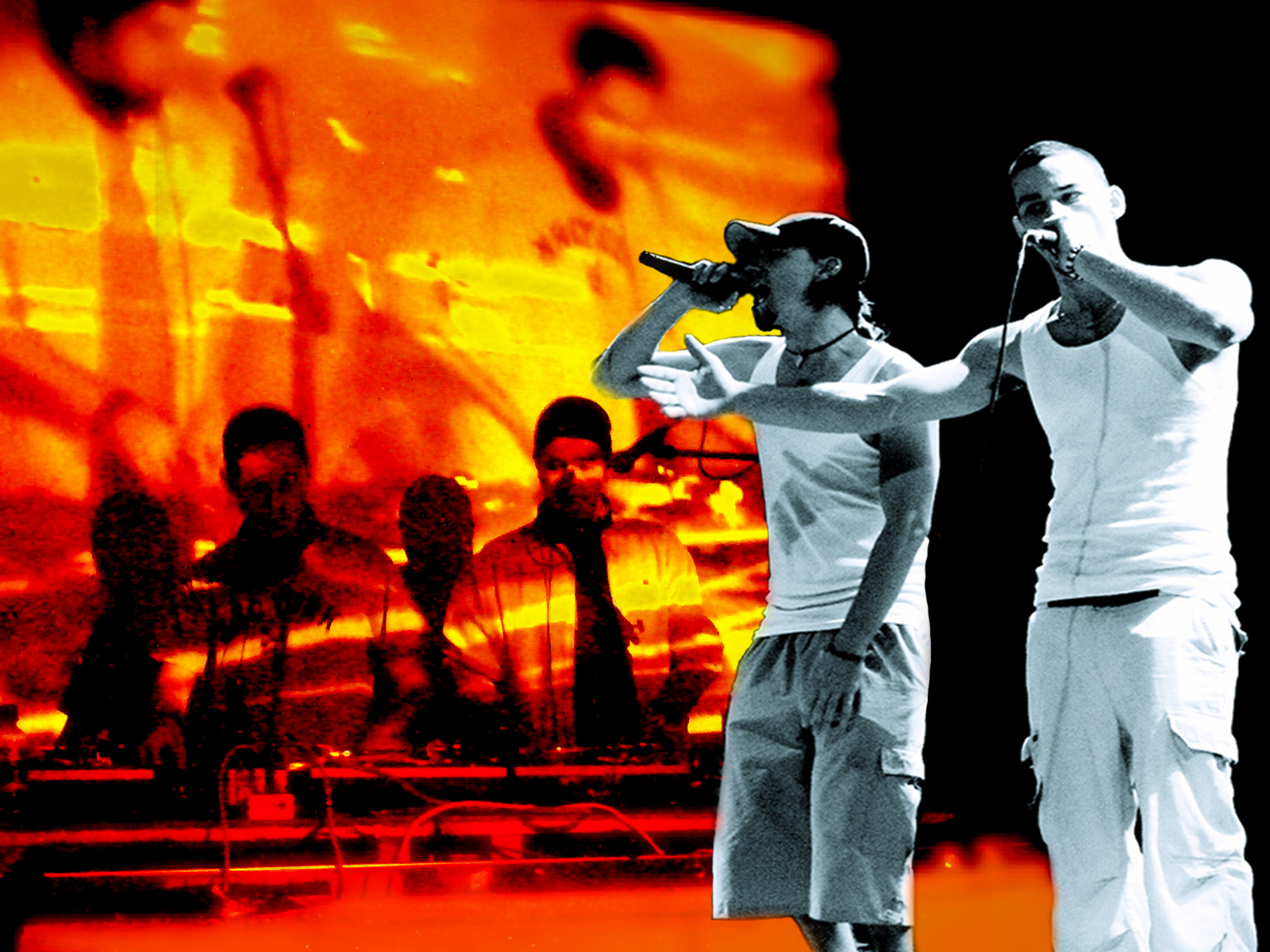
Blades

In 1999, the documentary Desert Rap! Hip-Hop in Alice Springs (dir. Tony Collins and Carmel Young) aired on ABC TV.

In 2004, independent filmmaker Oriel Guthrie debuted her documentary "Skip Hop" at the Melbourne International Film Festival (MIFF). The film includes live footage of freestyle battles and prominent gigs around Australia, as well as interviews with Def Wish Cast, DJ Peril, Hilltop Hoods, Koolism, Blades of Hades, Maya Jupiter, The Herd and Wicked Force Breakers.

"Out4Fame presents 2003 MC Battle For Supremacy" was the first (documented) national MC tournament and was responsible for supporting the careers of many MCs across Australia. The following year, MCs were invited to enter the tournament for the chance to compete in New Zealand. MCs who have competed in Battle For Supremacy tournaments include Weapon X, 360, Anecdote, Nfa, Justice, Dragonfly, Robby Bal Boa, Kaos, Tyna, Surreal, Cyphanetics, Delta. Guthrie also documented the 2004 and 2005 events and released them on DVDs. MC Justice went on to win 2005 "Scribble Jam MC Battle" in the US and is the first Australian to win the competition.

In 2007 Words from the City, a feature-length documentary on Australian hip-hop culture from writers/directors Natasha Gadd and Rhys Graham was released by The Australian Film Commission and ABC TV. Focusing on the lyrical artistry of Australian Hip Hop, the film documented some of the countries foremost crews such as Hilltop Hoods, Bliss and Eso, and Koolism, as well up and coming artists TZU, Downsyde, Layla, Maya Jupiter, MC Trey, Nick Toth, and Wire MC. Words From The City was nominated for five AFI Awards for Best Documentary, Best Direction in Documentary, Best Cinematography in Documentary, Best Editing in Documentary, and Best Sound in Documentary.

=== Publications ===
Stealth Magazine debuted in 1999 and was distributed worldwide via Tower Records.

== Rap in Australian politics ==
The earliest political discussion of hip-hop in Australia questioned whether controversial rappers from overseas should be permitted to enter and perform in the country, as was the case with Eminem in 2001. Australian hip-hop artists have since used their platform to make political statements and drive political change, with The Herd, Thundamentals and Combat Wombat being among those whose lyrics often highlight and denounce inequality. Throughout the era of John Howard's government, criticism of him and his policies were reoccurring themes in Australian hip-hop music until Labor MP Kevin Rudd won the 2007 federal election, with The Herd celebrating Howard's defeat on their 2008 single "The King Is Dead". Other notable critiques of Howard's government include TZU's "Recoil" and Quro's "Goodnight Mr. Howard". The latter release also featured the then Prime Minister on the cover.

A.B. Original, the collaboration between Indigenous rappers Briggs and Trials, was crucial to initiating debate on changing the date of Australia Day, particularly with their critical 2016 single "January 26".

While professional musicians have gone on to enter Australian politics, most notably Midnight Oil frontman Peter Garrett, no hip-hop artist has done so, although Briggs appeared to launch a campaign to enter Parliament in 2018, and has been since referred to himself as Senator Briggs in jest. In a notable event that stirred headlines, rapper Snoop Dogg faced a significant setback upon his planned visit to Australia. The incident, which unfolded in 2007, attracted widespread attention and sparked debates within both the entertainment industry and public sphere, with opinions divided on whether the decision was fair or not. Kevin Andrews is quoted as saying, "He doesn't seem the sort of bloke we want in this country". Snoop was later granted a full visa in 2008.

Elected politicians in Australia have also attempted to utilise rapping to reach a younger audience. In 2012, two Labor Party cabinet members in the Gillard government briefly delivered original policy-related lyrics backed by music: Trade Minister Craig Emerson commented on the carbon tax by performing an adapted version of the chorus of rock song "Horror Movie", referred to by some as the "No Whyalla Wipeout" rap; while Arts Minister Simon Crean marked a visit to a Parramatta arts centre by recording rhyming lines in a duet with sound artist Tokyo Love-In over the beat of "Ice Ice Baby". Greens Senator Scott Ludlam appeared in the 2014 G20 Brisbane summit episode of Juice Rap News, rapping ten lines criticising the Abbott government's mandatory data retention law.

The performance of American rapper Macklemore at the October 2017 NRL Grand Final became a topic of political discussion, due to its inclusion of "Same Love" at a time when Australians were voting on whether same-sex marriage should be legalised. Prime Minister Malcolm Turnbull was interviewed on The Project several days before the performance. When asked about his favourite hip-hop artist, Prime Minister Turnbull initially claimed that he was "still grieving for Tupac", later confessing that he finds much of hip-hop music to sound the same. He then surprised the hosts by offering to rap, reciting two sport-related lines without backing music: "Waleed, you're the man, you're the Tigers fan / You can talk, the Crows can squawk". A few days later, Opposition Leader Bill Shorten appeared on Fitzy and Wippa in a rap battle segment, rapping twelve lines over the instrumental of 50 Cent's "In da Club" and concluding his verse by dabbing. While Shorten's opponents at the rap battle were radio hosts Ryan Fitzgerald and Ray Hadley, several of his lines were directed at Turnbull, such as "Our economy's in debt but Malcolm's just chillin' / Hey Malcolm, can you lend us a couple of million?".

In the 2018 South Australian state election campaign, former Senator Nick Xenophon released a two-minute musical advertisement for his newly formed SA-Best party, centred upon himself rapping his party's concerns and policies for South Australia.

In 2021, Deputy Prime Minister Michael McCormack briefly accepted an invitation to rap by David Koch on Sunrise. Having been made aware of a hip-hop music video promoting COVID-19 vaccines in Sichuan, McCormack stated "You know, you know, make sure you get the jab, you know" whilst dancing awkwardly.

Jacinta Price, who served as Mayor of Alice Springs in 2020 and became a Country Liberal Party Senator for the Northern Territory in 2022, performed in local Alice Springs hip-hop groups in her youth. She adopted the "sexy, sassy, rap hip-hop chick" persona of "Sassy J" as a member of trio Catch the Fly, performing with them as recently as 2012.

== See also ==
- Indigenous music of Australia
- Alternative hip-hop
- Music of Australia
- Political hip-hop
- British hip-hop
- New Zealand hip-hop
