= 3D World (Australia) =

Australian street press publication

3D World was an Australian street press publication for the dance music community.

After being founded in Sydney in 1989, ownership of the publication changed hands several times before publication shut down in 2011.

It was superseded by Three Magazine, another publication by Street Press Australia Pty Ltd, which "was born out of the ashes of 3D World" in August 2011.

In 2000, 3DWorld Publishing founded the Australian Dance Music Awards to recognise achievements by musicians in dance music as well as hip-hop, which was then considered underground.
