= Hip Hop Show =

- Running time: 2 hours (9:00 pm – 11:00 pm)
- Home station: Triple J
- Hosted by: A.Girl
- Original release: 2004 – present
- Website: Official website

The Hip Hop Show is Australian radio station Triple J's programme dedicated to hip-hop music, broadcast every Tuesday night. It features new releases and interviews with up-and-coming talent. As of 2025, it is hosted by Sydney rapper A.Girl; prior to this, the show was anchored by several artists in residence after long-time presenter and Koolism MC Hau Latukefu retired after 14 years at the helm.

In the early 2000s, Triple J used to issue annual compilation CDs featuring some of the best hip-hop music from the show. The programme has also been rebroadcast on Radio Australia since 2010.

== Hosts ==
- A.Girl (2025–present)
- Various artists in residence (2023–2024)
- Hau Latukefu (2008–2022)
- Maya Jupiter (2004–2008)

== Controversy ==
On 13 December 2023, ABC ombudsman Fiona Cameron found that the 24 November 2023 edition of the Hip Hop Show breached the ABC's standards for due impartiality and for the responsible management of controversial programme material after guest presenter Miss Kaninna delivered pro-Palestine comments during the show, prompting complaints.
