= 1200 Techniques =

Australian hip hop group

- Origin: Melbourne, Victoria, Australia
- Genres: Hip hop; funk
- Years active: 1997–2005; 2014–current
- Label: Rubber/Sony
- Members: DJ Peril; Nfamas (N'Fa Forster-Jones); Kemstar

1200 Techniques are an Australian hip hop group formed in 1997 in Melbourne, Australia, consisting of DJ Peril (Jason Foretti) as producer, percussionist, DJ; N'fa Forster-Jones as lead vocalist (under the name Nfamas) and Kemstar (DJ Peril's brother, Simon Foretti) as lead guitarist. Whilst primarily being in the genre of hip hop, they drew influences from other genres including rock, funk, soul, electro, drum and bass, electro jazz and breakbeat. They released their debut studio album, Choose One, in March 2002.

AllMusic's Jody Macgregor wrote, "Although Australia had an underground hip-hop scene starting in the late '80s, it wasn't until 2001 that it began to be recognized by the mainstream of Australian music. 1200 Techniques were an important part of that moment, with charting singles, appearances on TV shows like John Safran's Music Jamboree, and a sound that contained an eclectic blend of rock, dance, and funk influences to win over those Australians unconvinced their country had a place as a producer of quality hip-hop music." The group disbanded in 2005 and reformed in 2014.

== History ==
Brothers DJ Peril (Jason Foretti) and Kemstar (Simon Foretti) were involved in Australian hip hop, since the early 1980s as pre-teens. DJ Peril started with the Island Boys, one of Melbourne's first ever hip hop crews and he was the DJ in a number of different bands: Big Pacific, Rollercoaster, Dub and Reggae, and Blow Sound Unit.

Peril formed 1200 Techniques in 1997, as producer, percussionist and DJ, with the English-born brothers Nfamas (N'fa) on lead vocals and Kabba Foster-Jones on vocals. The Foster-Jones brothers had moved from London to Perth in 1983, they were both in a hip-hop crew, Deadly Fresh, during the mid-1990s before relocating to Melbourne. When DJ Peril saw the duo working with another band, he approached them, "I thought they were wasting their talent." The group's name references, "the Technics 1200 turntable the name also represents the multi-direction attitude of the group's music." Kemstar joined soon after, Kabba then returned to London in 1999. Kabba's vocals can still, however, be heard on some of the group's early tracks, "Don't Stop". 1200 Techniques continued with the three remaining core members, recruiting a drummer for live shows.

In 2001, 1200 Techniques were signed to an independent label called Rubber Records and they released their debut Extended Play titled Infinite Style. The lead single from the EP "Hard as Hell" was released and had a low budget video clip which saw the song receive national recognition on Triple J.

In April 2002, the band released the single "Karma", the lead single from their debut studio album Choose One. "Karma" became a crossover success. Choose One was released in June and peaked at number 20 on the ARIA Charts. At the ARIA Music Awards of 2002, the group were nominated for five awards, with "Karma" winning Best Independent Release and Best Video. Also in 2002, the band won Best Debut Artist and Best Hip Hop Act at the Dance Music Awards. The group supported Linkin Park on their 2002 Australian tour that year and headlined their own tour with support by American rapper Princess Superstar.

Their second album Consistency Theory was released in January 2004, and peaked at No. 38 on the ARIA album chart. Three singles were released from the album and all appeared on the ARIA singles chart. Following the album's release, the group appeared at the Big Day Out festival in early 2004. At the ARIA Music Awards of 2004, the lead single "Eye of the Storm" was nominated for two awards. The group went on hiatus in 2005 to allow the individual members to pursue solo work. In October 2014, the group reformed and announced the release of a new extended play. After a successful fundraising campaign on PledgeMusic, the band released Time Has Come in January 2015.

== Band members ==
- Jason Mark Foretti p.k.a. DJ Peril: Founder, producer, turntablist, percussionist
- N'Fa Deynde Jo Jo Forster-Jones p.k.a. Nfamas: vocals
- Kabba Adewale Verne Forster-Jones p.k.a. MC Kabba: vocals (rapping) (1997–1999)
- Simon Chris Foretti p.k.a. Kemstar: guitar

== Solo careers ==
DJ Peril released a solo album, King of the Beats in 2006, which includes the singles "It's About to Blow" and "Rock Ya Baby". the latter featuring singer Rahsaan Patterson.

Nfamas released a solo album, as N'fa, called Cause An Effect in 2006. Both of the album's video clips were directed by his friend, actor Heath Ledger.

Kemstar played guitar with his band Quarter 2 Nine circa 1990 as well with the Australian supergroup The Jack (with members of You Am I, Grinspoon, The Living End, Spiderbait, and Sender) for the 2004 Thunderstruck film soundtrack, performing on the songs "Crash & Burn" and "It's a Long Way to the Top (If You Wanna Rock 'n' Roll)".

== Discography ==
=== Studio albums ===
List of studio albums, with selected details and chart positions
Title	Album details	Peak chart positions
Title	Album details	AUS
Choose One	Released: March 2002; Label: Rubber Records (RUB137); Formats: CD	20
Consistency Theory	Released: January 2003; Label: Rubber Records (RUB159); Formats: CD, 2xLP, CD+DVD	38

=== Compilation albums ===
List of compilation albums, with selected details
Title	Album details
1200 Techniques	Released: August 2006; Label: Tronador Music (TMSS36-2); Formats: CD

=== Extended plays ===
List of EPs, with selected details
Title	EP details
Infinite Styles	Released: 2001; Label: Rubber (RUB131); Formats: CD, LP
Time Has Come	Released: February 2015; Label: Rubber (RUB289); Formats: CD, download, streaming

=== Singles ===
List of singles, with selected chart positions
Title	Year	Peak chart positions	Album
Title	Year	AUS	Album
"Hard as Hell"	2001	—	Infinite Styles
"Karma (What Goes Around)"	2002	36	Choose One
"Eye of the Storm"	2003	84	Consistency Theory
"Where Ur At"	2003	35	Consistency Theory
"Fork in the Road"	2004	55	Consistency Theory
"Time Has Come"	2015	—	Time Has Come
"Flow Is Trouble" (featuring Ghostface Killah)	2015	—	Time Has Come

== Awards ==
=== ARIA Music Awards ===
The ARIA Music Awards is an annual awards ceremony that recognises excellence, innovation, and achievement across all genres of Australian music. 1200 Techniques have won two awards from eight nominations.

Year	Nominee / work	Award	Result
2002	Choose One	Breakthrough Artist - Album	Nominated
2002	"Karma"	Breakthrough Artist - Single	Nominated
2002	"Karma"	Best Dance Release	Nominated
2002	"Karma"	Best Independent Release	Won
2002	Michael Gracey and Babyfoot Productions for "Karma"	Best Video	Won
2003	"Eye of the Storm"	Best Dance Release	Nominated
2003	"Eye of the Storm"	Best Independent Release	Nominated
2004	Consistency Theory	Best Urban Album	Nominated
