= Koolism =

Australian hip hop duo

- Origin: Canberra, Australian Capital Territory, Australia
- Genres: Hip hop
- Years active: 1992–present
- Labels: Paralex View; Hydrofunk Records; Invada Records; Mushroom Records
- Members: Hau Latukefu; Daniel Elleson
- Past members: Sione Latukefu; Hounga Latukefu
- Website: Official website

Koolism is an Australian hip hop duo originating from Canberra, Australian Capital Territory.

The members are lyricist Hau Latukefu (born Langomi-e-Hau Latukefu in 1976 in Queanbeyan, New South Wales, Australia) and producer, DJ and musician Danielsan Ichiban (born Daniel Elleson in 1965 in Auckland, New Zealand).

== History ==
Koolism started out in 1992 when Elleson (aka DJ Rampage) joined a group by the name Tribe Ledda L (L for Latukefu), which comprised Hau and his cousins Hounga and Sione. By 1995, only DJ Danielsan and Hau remained and they changed the name to Koolism, from a song with that name which they recorded the previous year. Their first appearance using that name is on the Homebrews Volume 1 compilation. Their first official release, Bedroom Shit came out in 1996 on cassette and was passed around the country from one person to the next – the inspiration for the track "Tapes" on their 2006 album, New Old Ground.

The tape caught the attention of Blaze and Dr Phibes, who offered to put out their next release on vinyl on their recently formed 'Parallax View' label and in 1998 Lift Ya Game was released. This was followed two years later by the Blue Notes EP and in 2002 they released The Season EP. These last two were part of a four-part series of EPs forming a collage when put together – however, the last two in this series, Butcher Shop and The Epic have never been released as most of the material was stolen during a car break-in while touring in 2004.

The duo released the highly anticipated Part 1 in 2002. It was their first album on CD, and contained fresh tracks alongside those previously only released on vinyl. This CD release allowed Koolism to expand on their underground following to cater to a wider, ever-growing fan base. Koolism's commercial existence has also been enhanced by Australia's leading music program, rage, airing the film clip to "The Season", the title track to their 2002 EP. 2002 also saw Koolism nominated in two categories (Best Hip Hop and Best Video) at that year's Australian Dance Music Awards.

In 2003, the group toured the county relentlessly scoring high praise for their live show. 'These lads have a strong reputation for putting on great live gigs.' JUICE (July 2003) Koolism again received nominations at the 2003 Australian Dance Music Awards, this time in three categories (Best Hip Hop Act, Turntabalist and Remix).

During their tour they also recorded their third album Part 3 - Random Thoughts (Part 2 was meant to be the EPs). The album features guest appearances by Rodney P (UK), Nfamas (1200 Techniques), and Mnemonic Ascent and was released in early 2004.

In 2004, Koolism won an ARIA Award for Best Urban Release, for their album out on Invada Records, Part 3 - Random Thoughts. The pair subsequently leaving Canberra with Hau moving north to Sydney and Danielsan heading to Melbourne. In February 2006, Koolism released their third album, New Old Ground on Invada records.

Koolism were one of the Australian hip hop artists featured in the documentary Words from the City, which aired on ABC Television in late 2007.

In 2008, Koolism signed to Mushroom Records.

On 14 April 2008, Hau took over from Maya Jupiter as the host of Triple J's weekly Hip Hop Show.

== Discography ==
=== Studio albums ===
Year	Album details	Peak chart positions	Certifications (sales threshold)
Year	Album details	AUS	Certifications (sales threshold)
1993	These Front Door Keys: Release date: 1993; Label: Independent (release attributed to Tribe Ledda L); Format: Cassette	—	
2002	Part One: Release date: 2002; Label: Parallex View (PVCD-002); Format: CD	—	
2004	Part Three - Random Thoughts: Release date: 10 May 2004; Label: Invada Records (INVLP013); Format: CD, Vinyl	—	ARIA Award (Best Urban Release)
2006	New Old Ground: Release date: 10 February 2006; Label: Invada Records (INVLP026); Format: CD	—	
2010	The 'Umu: Release date: 3 September 2010; Label: Invada Records (INVLP035); Format: CD	—	

=== EPs ===
- Bedroom Shit - Independent (1996)
- Lift Ya Game - Paralex View (1998)
- Blue Notes - Paralex View (2000)
- The Season - Paralex View (2002)
- Diverse - Hydrofunk Records (2002)
- "Tapes" - Invada Records (2006)
