= Mnemonic Ascent =

Australian hip hop group

- Origin: Australia
- Genre: hip hop
- Years active: 1999-2015
- Label: Crookneck Records
- Members: BVA; Raph Boogie; DJ Ransom

Mnemonic Ascent is an Australian hip hop group made up of BVA (Sam Harris), and Raph Boogie (Rafael Rashid) from Adelaide with DJ Ransom (Phil Ivanov) from Melbourne. They release their albums through Raph Boogie's Crookneck Records.

== Discography ==
- The Outside Inn (2001) - Crookneck Records
- The Book's Full (2005) - Crookneck Records
