= Pale Rider (Drapht album) =

Studio album by Drapht
- Released: 10 October 2003
- Recorded: 2003 Perth, Australia
- Genre: Australian Hip-Hop
- Length: 39:59
- Label: Syllabolix Records
- Producers: Dazastah, Optamus, Fdel

Drapht chronology
Pale Rider (2003)	Who Am I (2005)

Pale Rider is the debut full-length album from Western Australian hip hop artist, Drapht. It was released in October 2003 through Australian Hip Hop label, Syllabolix Records. The album features contributions by MC Layla, Dazastah, Optamus and Hunter. Tracks were produced by Dazastah, Optamus or Fdel. Matt Unicomb in 3D World describes the album as being "one of Western Australia's defining hip hop achievements."

== Overview ==
The ninth track on the album, "Weather Man," features samples from Eminem's "Square Dance." In a 2003 interview Drapht states that the title of the album is based on the Clint Eastwood movie of the same name and 'all my life being told that I have real pale skin'. The artwork is by Perth graffiti artist, Dash (who also produced the artwork for Brothers Grimm and The Life of Riley). It received national airplay on Triple J radio station.

In August 2008 Drapht told Ted Schlechte of Drum Media Perth that "I was fortunate to be hanging out with the Downsyde boys and the rest of SBX who were hugely influential. Essentially I got into music because it really amazed me how Daz [Dazastah] tackled his writing style with his witty punch-lines. Aggression was one thing I wanted to rid myself of though, at that time in my life it was my venting process. An angry teen mad at society, and myself. But we live to grow through that." Daniel Fosky of Scene described how the artist had developed "from the angst driven young Perth rapper leaking out" of Pale Rider. Drapht describes that at the time of writing the album he was like "all other teens"..."an angry, ignorant handful with an overload of self-importance and shutoff to the rest of the world." In another interview he has also stated that at that time he was "100% closed minded" and "just listened to hip-hop."

A review of the album on Ozhiphop.com states "Drapht delivers verses that are well constructed and delivered on point every time. Packed full of creative wordplay, punches and a flow that is very unique and works well over the beats provided. Tracks such as "Weather Man" provide a good example of Drapht's ability to switch up and address the scenes and worlds issues, from Selwyn to the final verse on the war." and ""Hang 'em High" is an explosive lead off track that allows Drapht to show us exactly what he plans to do, rip strong verses over impressive production. Drapht has a flow that gets your head nodding as much as the beat provided by Fdel does."

== Track listing ==
Pale Rider
No.	Title	Writer(s)	Producer(s)	Length
1.	"Intro"	Paul Ridge (aka Drapht), D. Reutens (aka Dazastah)	Fdel	1:45
2.	"Hang 'em High"	P. Ridge, D. Reutens, K. Hamilton	Fdel	3:39
3.	"Can't Escape" (feat. Porsah Laine)	P. Ridge, D. Reutens	Dazastah	3:42
4.	"Abuse the World" (feat. Porsah Laine)	P. Ridge, D. Reutens	Dazastah	3:50
5.	"Optical Illusion" (Instrumental)	P. Ridge, D. Reutens	Optamus	1:24
6.	"Prolific" (feat. Optamus)	P. Ridge, K. Hamilton	Fdel	4:08
7.	"Observe"	P. Ridge, D. Reutens	Dazastah	2:55
8.	"Uncontainable" (feat. MC Layla)	P. Ridge, D. Reutens	Dazastah	4:46
9.	"Weather Man"	P. Ridge, K. Hamilton	Fdel	4:30
10.	"Front Line" (feat. Dazastah, Hunter, MC Layla)	P. Ridge, D. Reutens	Dazastah	4:00
11.	"End That Way"	P. Ridge, D. Reutens	Dazastah	4:20
Total length:				39:59

== Credits ==
- P. Ridge (aka Drapht) - vocals
- Porsah Laine - vocals ("Can't Escape", "Abuse the World")
- Layla Rose Hanbury (aka MC Layla) - vocals ("Uncontainable", "Front Line")
- Robert Alan Hunter (aka Hunter) - vocals ("Front Line")
- D. Reutens (aka Dazastah) - vocals, turntables ("Intro", "Can't Escape", "Front Line")
- Scott Griffiths (aka Optamus) - beats ("Opticial Illusion", "Prolific")
- Damien Allia (aka DJ Armee) - turntables ("Hang 'Em High", "Prolific")
- Carlson Jeancharles (aka Carlsani) - turntables ("Uncontainable")
- Michael Mule (aka Finatik) - turntables ("Weather Man", "Front Line")
- Ken Ito (aka Karisma) - turntables ("End That Way")
- Producer - Dazastah
- Producer - Drapht
- Producer - Fdel
- Engineer – Laurie Sinagra
- Artwork - Dash
