= List of songs about Melbourne =

The music of Australia and most particularly the rock, pop, Hip hop and indie rock music of Australia has had a long fascination with the local environment be it urban or rural. This is a list of songs which mention or are about Melbourne the capital city of Victoria, Australia, the suburbs of Melbourne and nearby locations. In 2004, an article by Michael Dwyer published in The Age discussed songs written about Melbourne. A list of twenty-five songs about Melbourne were also published.

The Sydney Morning Herald ran a concurrent article discussing songs written about Sydney at the time. Paul Kelly had four songs in each list, one of which ("From St Kilda to Kings Cross") featured in both lists.

== A ==
- "A Brief History" by The Waifs
- "A Tale of Two Cities" by The Lucksmiths
- "Accidentally Kelly St" by Frente!
- "Accidentally Hoddle Street" by Peril
- "Alamein Train" by North To Alaskans
- "All Torn Down" by The Living End
- "An Argument with Myself" by Jens Lekman
- "Aqua Profunda" by Mick Thomas
- "Aqua Profunda!" by Courtney Barnett
- "Australia" by Guttermouth
- "Autumn Leaves" by Huxton Creepers

== B ==
- “Back to Mentone”, by Eddie Perfect
- "Balwyn Calling" by Skyhooks
- "Beat Parade" by Even
- "Beauties of Melbourne by John McIver (1880)
- "Beautiful People" by Australian Crawl
- "Boys Light Up" by Australian Crawl
- "Brighton Creeper" by Wendy & the Rockets
- "Brunswick" by Weddings Parties Anything
- "Brunswick Street Girl" by Warner Bros.
- "By the Banks of the Yarra" by the Coodabeen Champions.

== C ==
- "Carlton (Lygon Street Limbo)" by Skyhooks
- "Chapel Street etc." by Something for Kate
- "Charcoal Lane" by Archie Roach
- "Christmas In Melbourne" by Graeme Connors
- "City Flat" by Boom Crash Opera
- "Collingwood" by The Sharp
- "Coming Home" by Mark Seymour
- "Crazy Crazy Melbourne" by Wall of Voodoo
- "Crown Tower Blues" by Root!

== D ==
- "Deanna" by Nick Cave and the Bad Seeds
- "Dumb n' Base" by TISM
- "Depreston" by Courtney Barnett

== E ==
- "East London Summer" by The Smith Street Band
- "East West Link" by King Gizzard and the Lizard Wizard
- "Elevator Operator" by Courtney Barnett
- "Epping Line" by Scott & Charlene's Wedding

== F ==
- "Fat City" by Airbourne
- "Fatter Two" by Reason, Lazy Grey and Pegz
- "Fitzroy Bowl" by Cat Canteri
- "Fitzroy Strongman" by Sodastream
- "Footscray" by Billy Miller and Gary Adams
- "Footscray Park" by Bob Evans
- "Footscray Station" by Camp Cope
- "Footscray Station" by Scott & Charlene's Wedding
- "Four Seasons In One Day" by Crowded House
- "Fourteen Years in Rowville" by TISM
- "From Belgrave With Love" by Ron Rude
- "From Macaulay Station" by The Lucksmiths
- "From St Kilda to Fitzroy" by Amanda Palmer and the Grand Theft Orchestra
- "From St Kilda to Kings Cross" by Paul Kelly and the Coloured Girls
- "From The Bush" by Warumpi Band
- "From the, To The" by Scared Weird Little Guys
- "Frankston Line" by Youth Group
- “Frankston Line, The” by Eddie Perfect

== G ==
- "*Gasworks Park" by Ice Cream Hands
- "Geelong - Melbourne Railway" by Julius Albert von Rochlitz (1866)
- "Get Me Out" by New Model Army
- "Get Thee In My Behind, Satan" by TISM
- "Goodbye Melbourne Town" by Leonard Nelson and Fred Hall (1908)
- "Goodbye to Dear Old Melbourne" by Alfred Mansfield (1910)
- "Goin' Down" by Bias B
- "Greg! The Stop Sign!!" by TISM
- "Grey Skies Over Collingwood" by Strange Tenants (also covered by Weddings Parties Anything)

== H ==
- "Half way up the hill" by Mick Thomas
- "Happy Birthday Helen" by Things of Stone and Wood
- "Hello Cruel World" by Klinger
- "Hello! Melbourne (I Called You Up to Say Hello!) by Gene Birch and Lewis A Hirsch (1915)
- "Here Now" by Phrase
- "Highway 31" by Johnny Chester
- "Home Again" by Mark Seymour
- "Hoochie Coochie Fiorucci Mama" by Australian Crawl
- "Hookville" by Phrase

== I ==
- "I Can't Hear You, We're Breaking Up" by Courtney Barnett and Giles Field
- "I Dream of Spring" by k. d. lang
- "I've Been To Bali Too" by Redgum
- "I'm Going Back to My Girl in Melbourne (She's the Girl I left Behind Me!) by Paul Belham and WH Wallis (191x)

== J ==
- "January Rain" by Hunters & Collectors
- "John Cain Avenue" by My Friend The Chocolate Cake

== K ==
- "Killed her in St Kilda" by Voodoo Lovecats
- "Know" by Pegz

== L ==
- "Last House On The Left" by The Sports
- "Last Saturday Night" by Chris Wilson
- "Last Train From Mobiltown" by Broderick Smith's Big Combo
- "Leaps and Bounds" by Paul Kelly and the Coloured Girls
- "Leaving Melbourne" by Steve Eales
- "Let's Go Walk This Town" by My Friend the Chocolate Cake
- "Line to Line" by Bias B
- "Let’s Take a Trip to Melbourne" by Clement Williams
- "Low Dan" by Otouto
- "Lygon Street Meltdown" by Melbourne Ska Orchestra

== M ==
- "Machete" by Mark Chopper Read, Bias B, Trem and Brad Strut
- "Mañana, Mañana" by Weddings Parties Anything
- "Melba" by Jeff Rosenstock
- "Melbourne" by Sean Tyas
- "Melbourne" by The Whitlams
- "Melbourne" by Urban Problems
- "Melbourne" by Slowly Slowly
- "Melbourne Burning" by The DC3
- "Melbourne City" by David Bridie
- "(I've Just Run out of) Melbourne Clichés" by The Late Show (parody of "Happy Birthday Helen" by Things of Stone and Wood)
- "Melbourne Girl" by Tripod
- "Melbourne Girls" by Paul Kelly and the Coloured Girls
- "Melbourne is Closed" by Greg Champion
- "Melbourne Mafia" by Dave Graney
- "Melbourne Memories" by Bias B
- "Melbourne Song" by Colin Hay
- "Melbourne Sound" by Matty Lincoln Ft. Mandas
- "Melbourne Suburbs Medley" by Gabriel Rossi
- "Melbourne Summer" by Iota
- "Melbourne To Sydney in 18 Hours" by Bushwackers
- "Melbourne Town" by Neil Murray
- "Melbourne's Just Not New York" by Little Heroes
- "Melburn" by Luke Chable
- "Melodies Of St Kilda" by Masters Apprentices
- “Mentone! O, Mentone!, by Eddie Perfect
- "Montsalvat Wedding" by Damian Balassone
- "Move On" by Jet
- "Mourningtown Ride" by TISM
- "Music To Hold Hands To" by Lucksmiths
- "My Arse Is Black from Bourke Street" by Chain
- "My Brown Yarra" Yarra by Frank Jones and the Whirling Furphies
- “My Sister Worked at Bunnings”, by Eddie Perfect

== N ==
- "Napiers Bar" by Cheezlekane
- “Nepean Highway”, Eddie Perfect
- "Never Turn Right at Burke Road, Malvern" by Greg Champion
- "New Kind of Love Song" by the Whirling Furphies
- "New Moon Cafe" by Mick Thomas
- "Northcote (So Hungover)" by The Bedroom Philosopher
- "Northcote" by Blood Duster
- “North Melbourne” by Allday
- "Nothing Beats Footy At The MCG" by Jim Cadman
- "Nut Busta" by Bias B

== O ==
- "Out in the Suburbs" by Captain Matchbox Whoopee Band
- "Old Fitzroy" by Dan Sultan
- "One Day in September" by Mike Brady

== P ==
- "Platform Girl" by Peter Sherwood
- "Please Don't Move to Melbourne" by Ball Park Music
- “Plummer Road”, by Eddie Perfect
- "Postcards From Melbourne" by Raul Graf/Ed Kuepper
- "Prague" by Ruck Rover
- "Press Release" by Lyrical Commission
- "Pub" by Cosmic Psychos
- "Punt Road Traffic" by Mark Ferrie

== R ==
- "Rainbow Suit" by Overnight Jones
- "Regent to Ruthven" by Marcel Borrack
- "Return To The City Of Folded Arms" by Bluebottle Kiss from Patient (album)
- "Rushall Station" by Underground Lovers
- "Roll On (song)" by The Living End
- "Riding Through The Dandenong Ranges" by Maximum Load.

== S ==
- "Sangria" by Remi
- "Selling Drugs, Corner King St and Flinders Lane" by TISM
- "Silver Friends" by The Lucksmiths
- "Sixteen In Melbourne" by Ron Rude
- "Smith St" by The Waifs
- "Smorgons Steel Mill" by The T-Bones
- "Song Of The Renter" by Catholic Guilt.
- "Spotswood" by The Orbweavers
- "Springvale Girl" by Loin Groin
- "Spring Me Out Of Caroline Springs" by Root!
- "Stalactites" by Weddings Parties Anything
- "Statues" by Frank Jones and the Whirling Furphies
- "St Kilda Nights" by Purple Dentists
- "Streets Of Old Fitzroy" by Harry and Wilga Williams and the Country Outcasts
- "Stuck In Melbourne" by Warner Bros
- "Suburban Rendezvous" by Frank Jones
- "Suburb In Between" by The Mabels
- "Summer Days" by TZU
- "Sunbury '97" by The Fauves

== T ==
- "Take Me Back to Melbourne Town (with alternative words to give "Take Me Back to Sydney Town")" by Andrew Stirling and Harry von Tilzer (1907)
- "Taking the tram to Carnegie" by the band Oscar.
- "Talking Lion Blues" by Mick Thomas
- "Thank You God" by Tim Minchin
- "That's the Thing about Football" by Greg Champion
- "The Beautiful Look City Today" by Gersey
- "The Boy Who Lost His Jocks On Flinders Street Station" by Painters and Dockers
- "The Boys Light Up" by Australian Crawl
- "The Clarke Sisters" by The Go-Betweens
- "The Crowd" by The Cat Empire
- "The History Of Western Civilisation" by TISM
- "The Melbourne Cup" by Slim Dusty
- "The Mordialloc Road Duplicator" by TISM
- "The Old Docklands Wheel" by Dave Graney
- "The Parable of Glenn McGrath's Haircut" by TISM
- " The Richmond Reels" by Tony Hargreaves and the Whirling Furphies
- "The Rites of Springy" by Root!
- "The Sandringham Line" by The Lucksmiths
- "The Young Crazed Peeling" by The Distillers
- "The Wine Song" by The Cat Empire
- "Thomastown" by Not Drowning, Waving
- "Thornbury by Ruck Rover
- "Three Oh Seven Ohh by Blood Duster
- "To Her Door" by Paul Kelly and the Coloured Girls
- "Toorak Cowboy" by Skyhooks
- "Toorak Tram" by Bernard Bolan,
- "Tramway Hotel" by The T-Bones
- "Tribute To Eltham" by Muphin of Muph & Plutonic
- "Twist Senorita" by The Sports
- "Tropical London" by Rancid

== U ==
- "Under the Clocks" by Weddings Parties Anything
- "Under the Rotunda" by The Lucksmiths

== V ==
- "Victoria's Secrets" by Augie March

== W ==
- "Walkabout" by Lyrical Commission
- "Watsonia" by Klinger
- "Waverley" by The Wagons
- "Waverley Park" by Loin Groin
- "We Are All Of Us In The Gutter, But Some Of Us Are Looking At The Sewerage" by TISM
- "Westgate" by Mark Seymour
- "Westgate" by The T-Bones
- "Westgate Bridge" by Sleepy Township
- "West End Riot" by The Living End
- "(Boys) What Did The Detectives Say?" by The Sports
- "Whatever Happened To The Old Pubs" by Shonkyytonk
- "What's At The End of Warrigal Road?" by Greg Champion
- "When I First Met Your Ma" by Paul Kelly and the Coloured Girls
- "When We're In Fitzroy" by Gretta Ray
- "Who?" by TZU
- "Whole Lotta Rosie" by AC/DC
- "Woman of Ireland" by Weddings Parties Anything

== Y ==
- "Yarra Song" by Billy Bragg
- "You Let My Tyres Down" by Tropical Fuck Storm
- "Young Drunk" by The Smith Street Band
- "Your Love is Like a Song" by Dan Sultan

== Songs erroneously thought to be about Melbourne ==
- "Morningtown Ride" by The Seekers. The song was originally a lullaby written by Californian folk singer Malvina Reynolds in 1957. It is often attributed to Melbourne for depicting an old-fashioned train trip to the similarly named beach-side town of Mornington (as The Seekers largely hailed from Melbourne).
- "Town With No Cheer" by Tom Waits – although often believed to be about Melbourne, the town of the title is actually Serviceton.

== See also ==
- "I've Been Everywhere" – a popular novelty song which mentions, inter alia, several Melbourne suburbs albeit not Melbourne itself.
- List of songs about Sydney
