= Who Am I (Drapht album) =

Who am I

Studio album by Drapht
- Released: 24 June 2005
- Recorded: 2004
- Genres: Australian Hip-Hop, Rap
- Length: 1:02:40
- Label: Obese
- Producer: Dazastah

Drapht chronology
Pale Rider (2003)	Who am I (2005)	Brothers Grimm (2008)

Who Am I is the second full-length album from Western Australian hip hop artist, Drapht. It was released in June 2005 through Australian Hip Hop label, Obese Records. It was released both in CD and limited 2 LP vinyl format. The album features contributions by MC Layla, Dazastah (Downsyde) and Pressure (Hilltop Hoods). Two songs from the album, "Drink Drank Drunk" and "The Music", received airplay on community radio stations and national youth broadcaster, Triple J, and featured on national music video show, rage. "The Music" samples Living Jazz's version of "Walk On By" and was selected by Triple J as a featured track for Ausmusic month in 2005. The album has subsequently been included in the National Film and Sound Archive (NFSA) as part of The Art of Sound, a collaborative project between the NFSA and selected regional art galleries, which examines the intersections between sound and the visual arts.

== Reception ==
In a review of the album, Carmine Pascuzzi, describes it as a compilation of "soulful melodies and some heavy textures". He goes further to state "Drapht’s strong voice is most apparent and he can therefore accentuate the topics he pinpoints, be it social and political concerns. And he throws in some good humorous elements as well which makes for something personable to his public. His style switching will stand him in good stead as he advances his prowess as an MC."

Clayton Bennett's review on the album comments that "Drapht has the flow and the skills. Dazastah makes hot beats. Alas despite these two surefire elements the official album Who Am I, the follow-up to Palerider, from Western Australian MC Drapht has some rough edges. Cheesy hooks and some overdone melodrama are pitfalls in an otherwise enjoyable release by the charismatic artist." Bennett goes on to state "Despite its downfalls Who Am I stands solid with diverse subject matter for a fifteen track album with the use of hooks hit and miss but the flows and lyrical ability are on point throughout."

Professional ratings
Review scores
Source	Rating
Central Station	
In the Mix	
The Mercury	3/5 stars

== Track listing ==
Who Am I?
No.	Title	Writer(s)	Producer(s)	Length
1.	"Intro"	Paul Ridge, D. Reutens	Dazastah, Drapht	1:19
2.	"Who Am I" (feat. Porsah Laine)	P. Ridge, D. Reutens	Dazastah, Drapht	4:27
3.	"Drink Drank Drunk"	P. Ridge, D. Reutens	Dazastah, Drapht	4:35
4.	"Inspiration Island" (feat. Downsyde, MC Layla)	P. Ridge, D. Reutens, L. Handbury, S. Griffiths, Shahbaz Rind	Dazastah, Drapht	6:01
5.	"What Have I Got"	P. Ridge, D. Reutens, K. Hamilton	Dazastah, Drapht, Fdel	3:43
6.	"Verbally Flawless" (feat. Pressure)	P. Ridge, D. Reutens, D. Smith	Dazastah, Drapht	3:42
7.	"The Music"	P. Ridge, D. Reutens, K. Hamilton	Dazastah, Drapht, Fdel	3:36
8.	"Got a Hold of Me"	P. Ridge, D. Reutens	Dazastah, Drapht	4:14
9.	"Yah Think" (feat. Dazastah, Pegz)	P. Ridge, D. Reutens	Dazastah, Drapht	4:11
10.	"Deep Sleepers"	P. Ridge, D. Reutens	Dazastah, Drapht	4:11
11.	"Who Can We Trust"	P. Ridge, D. Reutens	Dazastah, Drapht	5:09
12.	"The Sylla Squad" (feat. Clandestien, MJ, Hunter)	P. Ridge, D. Reutens	Dazastah, Drapht	5:58
13.	"Hold Up"	P. Ridge, D. Reutens	Dazastah, Drapht	3:30
14.	"Don't Take No"	P. Ridge, D. Reutens, K. Hamilton	Dazastah, Drapht	4:17
15.	"Wet T-Shirts" (feat. Dazastah)	P. Ridge, D. Reutens	Dazastah, Drapht	3:47
Total length:				62:40
