= Dazastah =

- Birth name: Darren Reutens
- Origin: Perth, Western Australia, Australia
- Genres: Hip hop
- Years active: 1994–present
- Labels: Syllabolix, Hydrofunk Records, Obese Records, Illusive Sounds
- Website: Myspace

Dazastah is one of the MCs of the Perth, Western Australia-based hip-hop group Downsyde.

== History ==
Dazastah (Darren Reutens) joined Downsyde when he met MCs Optamus (Scott Griffiths) and Dyna-mikes (Shahbaz Rind) at Leederville TAFE in the late 1990s. Dazastah is also a producer and as well as working on beats for Downsyde he has produced for interstate performers and is a prominent local producer, working on albums with Hunter and Clandestien. He is also a member of Western Australia hip hop crew, Syllabolix.

As well as the four studio albums he has been a part of with Downsyde, Dazastah produced his first album in 2002, Done DL with Hunter which featured many guest appearances from other Syllabolix Crew members. He played a large part in production of the Clandestien Album Dynasty, and also worked on the Hilltop Hoods' breakthrough 2003 album, The Calling. Six tracks with Dazastah's involvement have been on the Australian hip hop compilations albums, Culture of Kings, two on volume one and four on volume two.

== Discography ==
=== Downsyde ===
- Epinonimous – Syllaboliks (2000)
- Land of the Giants – Hydrofunk/Virgin (2003)
- When the Dust Settles – Obese (2004)
- All City – Illusive Records (2008)

=== Production ===
Hunter

- Done DL – Syllaboliks (2002) Tracks 1–10, 12–19

Clandestien

- Dynasty – Syllaboliks (2003) Tracks 1, 3, 10, 13, 15

MC Layla

- Heretik – Obese (2004)
- "Favourite Hour" – (2013)

Task Force & Pegasus

- 12" Apostles – Obese (2002) Tracks B1-B2

Hilltop Hoods

- The Calling – Obese (2003) Tracks 3, 13

Drapht

- Pale Rider – Obese (2003)
- Who Am I – Obese (2005)

Mystro

- Who You Gonna Blame – Grindin (2006)

Omni

- Batterie – NatAural High Records (2007) Tracks B1-B3

=== Guest appearances ===
- 2001: "A.T.O.M.S" (from Clandestien album Clandestien)
- 2003: "Front Line" (from Drapht album Pale Rider)
- 2005: "Sugar Trails" (from MC Layla album Heretik)
- 2005: "Muiltiple Choice" (from MC Layla album Heretik)
- 2005: "Ya Think" (from Drapht album Who Am I)
- 2005: "Wet T-Shirts" (from Drapht album Who Am I)
- 2005: "Inspiration Island" (from Drapht album Who Am I)
- 2005: "Dusty Fingers" (from Fdel album Audiofdelity)
- 2007: "Game Over" (from Bias B album Been There Done That)
- 2008: "Rest In Peace" (from Drapht album Brothers Grimm)

== Awards ==
All listed for Downsyde.

- 2003 Australian Dance Music Awards – Nominee – Best Hip-Hop act
- 2003 Australian Dance Music Awards – Winner – Best Debut Artist
- 2003 Australian Dance Music Awards – Nominee – Best Album – Land of the Giants
- 2003 Australian Dance Music Awards – Nominee – Best Single – "Gifted Life"
- 2003 Australian Dance Music Awards – Nominee – Best Australian Hip Hop Act
- 2003 WAMi Awards – Winner – Most Popular Local Original Urban Music Act
- 2003 WAMi Awards – Winner – Most Popular Local Original Music Video – "El Questro"
- 2003 WAMi Awards – Winner – Most Popular Original Local Album – Land of the Giants
- 2005 WAMi Awards – Winner – Best Live Electronic Act
- 2005 WAMi Awards – Winner – Best Urban Music Act
- 2006 WAMi Awards – Winner – Best Urban Music Act
- 2007 WAMi Awards – Winner – Best Urban Music / Hip Hop Act
- 2008 WAMi Awards – Winner – Best Urban Music / Hip Hop Act
