= Jimmy Recard =

Single by Drapht

from the album Brothers Grimm
- Released: May 2008
- Recorded: 2008
- Length: 3:33
- Label: Obese
- Songwriters: Paul Ridge; Daniel Rankine
- Producer: Trials

Drapht singles chronology
"Jimmy Recard" (2008)	"Falling" (2008)

Music video
- "Jimmy Recard" on YouTube

"Jimmy Recard" is a song by Australian hip hop musician Drapht, released in May 2008 by Obese Records as the lead single from his third studio album, Brothers Grimm (2009).

Written and recorded by Drapht in 2008 alongside Trials from Funkoars, "Jimmy Recard" was a commercial success, receiving airplay across various radio stations in Australia, peaking at number 92 on the ARIA Singles Chart, and polling at number 10 and number 71 in Triple J's Hottest 100 of 2008 and the 2025 Hottest 100 of Australian Songs, respectively.

== Background ==
In an interview with Australian youth radio station Triple J, Drapht explained how he came up with the name.

I was thinking of successful names so I jumped on the net and actually Googled successful names and came up with James and Recard. So I changed James to Jimmy and used Recard as the last name. I think a name does a lot for a character and where you go in life. And it was a positive track on the record because a lot of my stuff kind of feeds from negative ideas.

== Commercial performance ==
"Jimmy Recard" peaked at number 92 on the ARIA Top 100 Singles Chart on the chart issued 9 February 2010. The song also reached number 1 on the AIR Charts in April 2009.

"Jimmy Recard" was a commercial success, receiving airplay on various radio stations across Australia.

On 25 January 2009, the song polled at number 10 in Triple J's Hottest 100 of 2008. On 25 July 2025, it was ranked at number 71 in the Hottest 100 of Australian Songs in 2025.

== Music video ==
The music video was produced by Moving Still Productions.

== In popular culture ==
British comedian Jimmy Carr uses "Jimmy Recard" as his entrance music.

== Track listing ==
All tracks are written by Paul Reid and Trials, with production from the latter, except where noted.

"Jimmy Recard" CD single track listing
No.	Title	Producer(s)	Length
1.	"Jimmy Recard"		3:33
2.	"Jimmy Recard" (remix)	Optamus
3.	"Jimmy Recard" (radio edit)		3:33
4.	"Jimmy Recard" (instrumental version)		3:33
5.	"Falling"
6.	"Falling" (remix)	Dazastah
7.	"Falling" (radio edit)
8.	"Falling" (instrumental)

== Credits and personnel ==
Credits adapted from Spotify.

- Paul Reid – vocals, writing, recording
- Daniel Rankine – writing, recording, production
- Neville Clark – mastering, engineering

== Charts ==
"Jimmy Recard" weekly chart performance
Chart (2009)	Peak position
Australia (ARIA)	92

== Certifications ==
List of certifications received for "Jimmy Recard"
Region	Certification	Certified units/sales
Australia (ARIA)	2× Platinum	140,000^{‡}
New Zealand (RMNZ)	Gold	15,000^{‡}
^{‡} Sales+streaming figures based on certification alone.

== Release history ==
Release history and formats for "Jimmy Recard"
Region(s)	Date	Format(s)	Label(s)	Ref.
Australia	May 2008	Digital download; contemporary hit radio	Obese	
Australia	January 2009	Contemporary hit radio	Obese	
