= Vs Art =

Studio album by Damian Cowell
- Released: December 2010
- Recorded: 2010; Toyland Studios
- Genre: Alternative rock
- Length: 65:03
- Label: Museum of Old and New Art
- Producer: David Walsh

Damian Cowell chronology
Surface Paradise (2009)	Vs Art (2010)	The Future Sound of Nostalgia (2011)

Vs Art is the first solo album by Damian Cowell. It is sometimes considered a DC3 album, due to Cowell's DC3 bandmates Henri Grawe and Douglas Lee Robertson serving as the backing band.

The album was only available as a free CD with the first printing of the Museum of Old and New Art book Monanisms. Some of the songs on the album date back to 2008 and were performed by Cowell's former band Root!.

The tracks "Ce N'est Pas a Bunch of Lies" and "The Boy in the Box" were on Cowell's 2023 career retrospective album Damian Cowell, with the latter song being performed on the tour to promote it. A reworked version of "Ce N'est Pas a Bunch of Lies" has since been performed by Cowell's current band Arseless Chaps.

== Track List ==
No.	Title	Length
1.	"So This Guy Walks into a Bar"	4:04
2.	"Ce N'est Pas a Bunch of Lies"	4:05
3.	"Everybody"	3:05
4.	"Girls! Girls! Girls!"	4:29
5.	"Don`t Legalise It"	4:08
6.	"Stars"	5:21
7.	"Someone on The Other Side of The World Wants to Kill You"	4:57
8.	"Melbourne Burning"	4:48
9.	"The Car That Ate My Life"	4:26
10.	"The Quintessential Fuck-Off Art Explosion"	4:01
11.	"No App"	6:33
12.	"Hymn"	3:05
13.	"The Boy in the Box"	4:25
14.	"The No Longer Popular Google Search Word Party"	3:52
15.	"Shut the Fuck Up"	3:46
Total length:		65:03
