= Poowong =

- Town
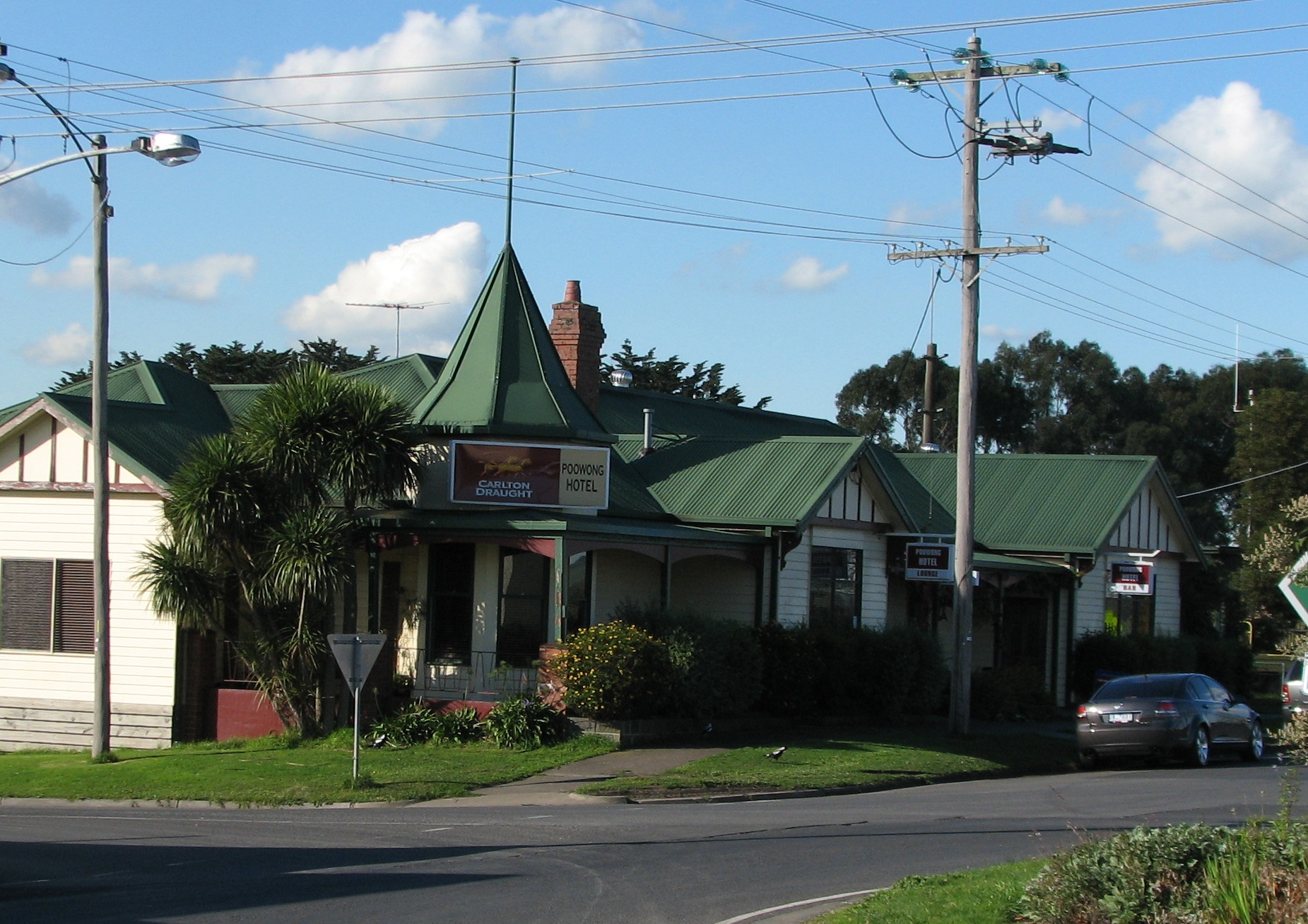
- Poowong Hotel

- Coordinates: 38°21′0″S 145°45′0″E
- Country: Australia
- State: Victoria
- LGA: South Gippsland Shire
- Location: 111 km (69 mi) SE of Melbourne; 29 km (18 mi) NW of Leongatha; 15 km (9.3 mi) NW of Korumburra; 12 km (7.5 mi) SE of Nyora

Government
  - State electorate: Gippsland East
  - Federal division: Monash

Population
  - Total: 389 (UCL 2021)
- Postcode: 3988
- County: Buln Buln

Poowong is a small dairying town located in South Gippsland, in the Australian state of Victoria. At the 2016 census, Poowong had a population of 360.

It is 111 kilometres (69 mi) from Melbourne and about eight kilometres (5 mi) north-west of Korumburra.

The town has an Australian rules football team, the Poowong Magpies, which plays in the Ellinbank & District Football League.

== History ==
The first application for land in the Parish of Poowong was made on 17 April 1874 by James Scott for 320 acres of allotment 5, the selection made on behalf on his son Robert Scott. Four more selectors pegged out allotments within the next twelve months. On part of the Scott land a store, pub and butcher's shop were built. The Poowong Hotel was built by 1880 but it was destroyed by fire in 1883.

A Post Office was in operation by March 1878. The first survey of townships allotments took place in 1879.

The heavily timbered and hilly nature of the area meant selectors took years to clear enough of their land to make a living from their selections.

== Facilities ==
For a town of its size, Poowong has a number of facilities. These include four tennis courts, two netball courts, an indoor basketball and squash stadium, a primary school, large community hall, outdoor swimming pool, a number of churches and an Australian rules football oval. The town has an Australian Rules football team and a netball team competing in the Ellinbank & District Football League and the Ellinbank & District Netball Association respectively.

== Community projects ==
The Poowong community is active, with many projects being undertaken by various community groups. The largest group is the Poowong Football & Netball Club who involve themselves not only in sporting projects, but also in projects helping the wider community. One such project is the 'My Connected Community' project which was run by the Poowong Football Club in a partnership with the Strzelecki Lions Club, and was designed to increase Internet use amongst community members.

== Popular culture ==
The Melbourne rock band Root!, in their album Root Supposed He Was Out of the Question..., released a song entitled "The Ballad Of The Poowong Magpies".

== Notable people from Poowong ==
- Wilfred Burchett – war correspondent
- Albert Francis Ronalds – prominent civil engineer
- Don Watson – writer and historian
- Rudi Mandemaker – full forward representing South Australia in interstate Australian Rules football who also won the Mark of the Year (SANFL) in 1989
- Jai Newcombe, AKA "The Poowong Punisher" an AFL footballer for the Hawthorn Football Club
