= Damian Cowell =

- Also known as: Humphrey B. Flaubert; DC Root
- Born: Melbourne, Victoria, Australia
- Genres: Alternative rock
- Instruments: Vocals, drums, drum machine, keyboards
- Years active: 1970s–present
- Labels: Elvis, Musicland, Phonogram, Shock, FMR, Madman, Meek Joe, Museum of Old and New Art
- Member of: TISM, Arseless Chaps
- Formerly of: I Can Run, Root!, The DC3, Damian Cowell's Disco Machine

Damian Joseph Cowell, also known by his stage names Humphrey B. Flaubert and DC Root, is an Australian musician who is best known as the frontman for TISM, Root!, The DC3, Damian Cowell's Disco Machine and Arseless Chaps.

== History ==
Cowell was born and schooled in Melbourne. His musical output began in the 1970s, when he played in various high school bands, such as Abroz and Kestrel Hawk. In the early 1980s, he was part of a little-known group called I Can Run, featuring future TISM bandmate Eugene Cester.

=== TISM ===
In December 1982, TISM formed and Cowell adopted the pseudonym "Humphrey B. Flaubert", a play on Australian children's television character Humphrey B. Bear and French author Gustave Flaubert. The group enjoyed underground success in the late 1980s and reached the ARIA top 10 in 1995 with their album Machiavelli and the Four Seasons. TISM won two ARIA Music Awards, and split in late 2004 following the release of their sixth album, The White Albun.

TISM remained largely anonymous throughout their career. In 2010, Cowell publicly acknowledged his involvement in TISM via the debut single of his band The DC3 – a song titled "I Was The Guy In TISM".

In 2022, following an almost 18-year hiatus, TISM reformed, performing at the Good Things festival, and releasing a new album Death to Art. Members of Damian Cowell's Disco Machine, Gordon Blake, Bek Chapman and Will Hindmarsh appear as guests on the album's first single, "I've Gone Hillsong".

Even though much of Cowell's work uses programmed drums, he has played live drums at times, most notably during some songs in TISM's performance at Homebake 1998.

=== Post-TISM ===
Cowell returned to the stage in 2007 under the moniker DC Root, fronting a band called Root! Root! released two albums and an EP. During this period he was commissioned by David Walsh to create a soundtrack for his Museum of Old and New Art. The resulting album, Vs Art, was only obtainable as a CD with the first printing of the MONA book Monanisms.

In 2010, Root! disbanded and quickly re-formed as a three-piece, The DC3. This group would continue on until 2013, releasing two albums.

Between 2014 and 2021, Cowell performed in the band Damian Cowell's Disco Machine, with Tony Martin as a recurring guest. The Disco Machine released three albums, including 2021's Only The Shit You Love, an ambitious double album which formed the basis of a 19-part web-series, scripted and animated by Cowell.

In 2024, Cowell and Martin formed the duo Arseless Chaps. Their debut album was released in 2025.

== Album discography ==
=== Root! ===
- Root Supposed He Was Out of the Question... (2007)
- Surface Paradise (2009)

=== Damian Cowell ===
- Vs Art (2010)
- Damian Cowell (2023) - post-TISM career retrospective

=== The DC3 ===
- The Future Sound of Nostalgia (2011)
- May Contain Traces of Nut (2013)

=== Damian Cowell's Disco Machine ===
- Damian Cowell's Disco Machine (2015)
- Get Yer Dag On! (2017)
- Only The Shit You Love (2021)

=== Arseless Chaps ===
- Arseless Chaps (2025)
