= MC Layla =

Layla
- Born: Layla Rose Hanbury; 5 October 1982 (age 44)
- Origin: Perth, Western Australia, Australia
- Genre: Hip hop
- Occupations: Singer; Songwriter; MC
- Instrument: Vocals
- Years active: 2000–present
- Label: Obese

Layla Rose Hanbury (born 5 October 1982), known mononymously as Layla, is an Australian hip hop singer-songwriter and MC from Perth. In January 2005 she released her debut solo album, Heretik, on Obese Records. She is a member of Syllabolix (SBX) Crew, with other MCs including her husband, Dazastah (a.k.a. Darren Reutens). The couple also perform as Layla and Dazastah. During September and October 2011 the duo were a support act for another SBX artist, Drapht, on his Australia-wide Party Party Party Tour.

== Biography ==
Layla Rose Hanbury was born 5 October 1982. In 2000 Layla's first gig was at an MC battle where she was the only female among 20 entrants. Layla is a member of the Syllaboliks (SBX) Crew with other Australian MCs and hip hop acts: Drapht, Matty B, Dazastah, Hunter, Downsyde, and Clandestien. In 2001 Layla provided raps for Clandestien's track "A.T.O.M.S.", alongside Dazastah and Dynamikes, which appeared on the group's debut album, Clandestien. The following year she issued a track, "Its Only Me", on the Obese Records 2× CD compilation album, Culture of Kings Volume 2. In 2003 Layla was one of six artists interviewed for the VHS, All the Ladies, describing "what it is like to be a female MC in the Australian underground hip hop scene". Film footage included live performances from an earlier gig, Short 'n' Sweet, organised by fellow hip hop artist, A-Love (a.k.a. Antonella Formosa). Layla's solo track, "Maverick", appeared on the 2003 Various Artists compilation album, Straight from the Art.

On 12 January 2005 Layla released her debut album, Heretik, on Obese Records. The album included the single, "The Fuss About Sluts", which was co-written by Layla with Darren Reutens (a.k.a. Dazastah). The lyrics relate to female artists, exemplified by Britney Spears, who sexualise their performances and give young girls a poor example. Reutens also produced, mixed and recorded the album.

Her music is defined by her forceful and candid lyrics that range from her frustrations with female recording artists using their bodies to sell music in "The Fuss About Sluts", to an exploration of her own creative practices in "Driving Miss Layzy".

— Gadd, Natasha; Graham, Rhys, Words from the City (2007).

In the Mix website's Sophiska described Heretik's tracks, which "range from straight up hip hop battle jams ... to more reflective, instrumental composition ... The remainder are very theme dependant, 'Driving Miss Layzy' employs more of a light-hearted funk, soul formula to complement rhymes about laying back and procrastinating". Her brother, James, provided artwork for the album including a comic book in place of typical liner notes. After the release of her debut album, aside from performing, Layla also studied for a degree in natural medicine.

Layla and Dazastah have co-written material with Drapht, including "Inspiration Island" for his 2005 album, Who Am I. Layla has performed on albums by fellow SBX artists and some guested on her debut album. On 7 December 2007 Layla was featured in a documentary, Words from the City, on Australian hip hop artists, which was screened nationally on ABC Television.

In March 2011 Layla indicated that a follow-up album was possible – she had written material for "20 plus tracks". In May that year Layla married Dazastah; the couple had been in a domestic relationship since 2001, they gig together as Layla and Dazastah. During September and October 2011 the duo were a support act for Drapht on his Australia-wide Party Party Party Tour. On 11 February 2012, Layla helped launch a charity album, Australian Hip Hop Supports CanTeen, by various artists for the teen cancer support organisation, CanTeen. The project had been directed by SBX member, Hunter, who himself died of cancer in October 2011. Layla provided "Love Times Pie Recurring" for the album. In September 2012 Layla and Dazastah are due to play the Rhyme Intervention 5 Festival at the University of Canberra.

== Discography ==
=== Albums ===
- Heretik – Obese (OBR028) (12 January 2005)

=== Singles ===
- "The Fuss about Sluts" – Obese (OBR027) (2005) (limited edition 12" vinyl – 500 copies)

=== Other appearances ===
Layla has appeared on releases of other artists, including members of Syllabolliks Crew (*).

Year	Track(s)	Artist	Album
2000	"Dreams"	Bliss n Esoterikizm	The Arrival EP
2001	"A.T.O.M.S."	Clandestien (*)	Clandestien
2002	"It's Only Me"	Layla	Culture of Kings Volume 2
2002	"Divine Intervention" (Part 2)	Terra Firma featuring Layla	Suffering City Volume 1
2002	"Kids of the Future", "Oceanography", "Exposing Em", "Sin Stains in My Eyes", "Mutants", "MysticAL Alliance", "Co-Conspiriters"	Hunter (*) and Dazastah (*)	Done DL
2003	"Divine Intervention"	Terra Firma	Waking the Past
2003	"Maverick"	Various Artists	Straight from the Art
2004	"Verbal Diarrhoea"	Downsyde (*)	When the Dust Settles
2005	"Inspirational Island"	Drapht (*)	Who Am I?
2006		Hospice Crew	Visiting Hours
2008	"Straight Outta Tagged Corridor", "Every Corner", "I'm Sorry, I Hate You", "Cry Me a River", "Love 2 Love Ya", "Now I'm in the House", "Social Graces", "The Phantom of Hip Hop Era", "Right or Wrong"	Tomahawk	A Bitch Named Hiphop
2009	"Dumb Dumb", "Bling Bling"	Porsah Laine	Feel This
2010	"Monster House"	Hunter (*) and DJ Vame	Monster House
2010	"Judge and Jury"	Optamus	Forever and a Day
2010	"Dirty Thoughts"	Complete	Panic Disorder
2011	"Bat Country"	Hunter (*) and Mortar	Fear and Loathing
2012	"Swan Song"	Clandestien (*)	Weapons Grade
2012	"Love Times Pie Recurring"	Various Artists	Australian Hip Hop Supports CanTeen
2021	"Release Me"	Drapht (*)	Shadows and Shinings
