= Optamus =

- Also known as: Optamus; Bomb Scott
- Born: Scott Griffiths
- Origin: Perth, Western Australia, Australia
- Genre: Hip hop
- Years active: 1996–present
- Labels: Syllabolix; Hydrofunk Records; Obese Records; Illusive Sounds; Opt Shop
- Website: optamus.com.au

Scott Griffiths, better known by the stage name Optamus, is one of the MCs of the Perth-based Australian hip-hop group Downsyde and member of WA's Syllabolix Crew. Optamus is also the name of Griffiths' solo project.

== Music career ==
=== Downsyde ===
Griffiths with fellow Craigie Senior High School classmate Shahbaz Rind (Dyna-mikes ) founded Downsyde in 1996. It was the following year that they released a demo cassette Behind the Bucket which topped the independent charts within a week of its release. Optamus and Dyna-mikes met their third and last MC and producer, Darren Reutens Dazastah at Leederville TAFE. The group further expanded adding Damien Allia (DJ Armee), Mathew Cheetham (Cheeky) on bass guitar and keyboard together with Salvatore Pizzata (Salvatore) on drums to form Downsyde. In 2000 they released their debut album, Epinonimous, this was followed by Land of the Giants in 2003 and When the Dust Settles in 2005. The group went into hiatus for three years before releasing All City in 2008.

=== 2010 onwards ===
As well as being a skilled MC, Griffiths is a producer. As well as working on beats for Downsyde, he has produced for many Australian acts, including Hunter, Drapht and Bias B. As of 2010 he was running his own local independent label, Opt Shop Records.

Optamus released his debut solo album Forever & A Day on 12 June 2010. Optamus is also the name of his group, a trio with keyboardist Chris 'Imposter' Foster and multi-instrumentalist Jeremy Jongsma (Moondog). The album includes a number of guest artists including Hunter, Trials (Funkoars), Drapht, Hau (Koolism), Downsyde and MC Layla.

Optamus previewed the album to a sold-out home crowd (Rosemount Hotel W.A) and a tour through the southwest in June 2010. Forever and A Day went on to sell 3500 copies from his website. "Lookaround" became a Triple J single and they toured Australia extensively.

A second album, A Hero's Concerto, was released on 20 September 2019.

In November 2022, Optamus collaborated with other First Nations artists Emma Donovan, Emily Wurramara, Drmngnow, and DOBBY to create a song in memory of Cassius Turvey, a Noongar-Yamatji boy who had died at the age of 15 the result of an assault by a random attacker when walking home from school in Perth, Western Australia. The song, titled "Forever 15", was played at Turvey's funeral on 18 November 2022 funeral and released three days later on 21 November 2022.

== Other activities ==
Griffiths also conducts workshops for African immigrants and Aboriginal youth.

I run a hip hop workshop program where the participants get to write a song and learn about the hip hop culture and the Australian hip hop culture. For me it's another aspect of what I do as a musician, that makes me feel like I'm balancing the karma from being able to tour and live a life where I get to do something I love, I think this is my 'give back'.

— Scott Griffiths

== Discography ==
=== Downsyde ===
- Behind the Bucket – Independent (1997) demo cassette
- Epinonimous – Syllaboliks (September 2000)
- Land of the Giants – Hydrofunk/Virgin (HF 30) (March 2003)
- When the Dust Settles – Obese (OBR026) (December 2004)
- All City – Illusive Records (ILL014CD) (4 October 2008)
- ClassicILL MGM / Shakedown Records 2018

=== Optamus ===
- Forever and a Day – Opt Shop (SBX023) (12 June 2010)
- A Hero's Concerto – Opt Shop (SBX028) (12 Oct 2019)

=== Production ===
Downsyde

- Behind The Bucket – Yirra Yaakin (1997), whole album
- Epinonimous – Syllabolix MGM (2000), tracks 2, 4, 5, 6, 9, 10

When The Dust Settles

- All City – Illusive (2009), tracks 1, 2, 5, 9, 10, 11, 13

Clandestien

- Clandestien – Syllabolix (2001), track 4

Hunter

- Done DL – Syllabolix (2002), tracks 11, 16, 18
- Culture of Kings II – Obese (2002), disc 1, track 2 ("Jam Roll")

Matty B

- The Courageous LP – Obese (2002), track 7
- Culture of Kings III – Obese (2003), track 1

Bias B

- In Bed With Bias – Wordburner (2004), tracks C1, D3
- Been There Done That – Obese Records (2007), track 9

Drapht

- Culture of Kings III – Obese (2004), disc 1, track 1 ("Misunderstood")

Fdel

- Audiofdelity – Invada Records (2005), track 8

Hunter

- Going Back to Yokine – Obese Records (2006), track 15

Omni

- Batterie – NatAural High Records (2007), tracks B1-B3

== Awards ==
- 2003 Australian Dance Music Awards – Nominee – Best Hip-Hop act
- 2003 Australian Dance Music Awards – Winner – Best Debut Artist
- 2003 Australian Dance Music Awards – Nominee – Best Album – Land of the Giants
- 2003 Australian Dance Music Awards – Nominee – Best Single – "Gifted Life"
- 2003 Australian Dance Music Awards – Nominee – Best Australian Hip Hop Act
- 2003 WAMi Awards – Winner – Most Popular Local Original Urban Music Act
- 2003 WAMi Awards – Winner – Most Popular Local Original Music Video – "El Questro"
- 2003 WAMi Awards – Winner – Most Popular Original Local Album – Land of the Giants
- 2005 WAMi Awards – Winner – Best Live Electronic Act
- 2005 WAMi Awards – Winner – Best Urban Music Act
- 2006 WAMi Awards – Winner – Best Urban Music Act
- 2007 WAMi Awards – Winner – Best Urban Music / Hip Hop Act
- 2008 WAMi Awards – Winner – Best Urban Music / Hip Hop Act
- 2016 WAM Song Of The Year - Buridya Mob - produced and facilitated by Optamus
- 2017 WAM World Category - Akolkol Dastan Gesa produced and facilitated by Optamus
- 2019 WAM Song Of The Year Runner Up- Kya Kyana - Lyrics by Flewnt and Graham Dixon produced by Optamus and Inspired by Robert and Selina Eggington (Dumbartung)
- 2019 WAM Indigenous Category- Kya Kyana - Lyrics by Flewnt and Graham Dixon produced by Optamus and Inspired by Robert and Selina Eggington (Dumbartung)
- 2019 WAM Hiphop/Urban Category- Kya Kyana - Lyrics by Flewnt and Graham Dixon produced by Optamus and Inspired by Robert and Selina Eggington (Dumbartung)

=== Guest appearances ===
- 2001: "Lord of the Flies" (from Clandestien album, Clandestien)
- 2002: "Have a Drink With Us" (from Hunter album, Done DL)
- 2002: "Co-Conspiriters" (from Hunter album, Done DL)
- 2002: "Jam Roll" (from Culture of Kings II, Hunter track)
- 2005: "Dusty Fingers" (from Fdel album, Audiofdelity)
