= Get Up Yourself =

EP by Root!
- Released: 23 August 2008
- Recorded: 2008
- Genre: Country, spoken word, comedy
- Length: 14:52
- Label: Meek Joe Records
- Producer: Meek Joe

Root! chronology
Root Supposed He Was Out of the Question... (2007)	Get Up Yourself (2008)	Surface Paradise (2009)

Professional ratings
Review scores
Source	Rating
The Dwarf	positive

Get Up Yourself is an EP by Australian rock band Root!, released on 23 August 2008. It is both a follow-up to the band's previous release Root Supposed He Was Out of the Question... and a sample of the upcoming second album Surface Paradise (formerly Root is the Money of All Evil). The EP contains three tracks of Root!'s style of country and rock music and one track composed of a reworking of the title track featuring DC Root's signature ironic lyrics. It is an entirely spoken word track.

The band toured outside of Victoria for the first time in support of the release. Frontman DC was also interviewed on Triple J's popular breakfast show to promote the tour and EP. Whilst on air, he continually denied any link to Melbourne band TISM and also recited a poem about Stephanie Rice. Furthermore, a track titled "Introducing Get Up Yourself" appeared on the band's MySpace page and featured brief samples from "Get Up Yourself" and "Get Up Yourself Part 2" as well as DC Root explaining the release and the aims of the songs.

Track 2, "DC Root's Failure", was retitled "If" in 2010, being released on Root's successor band the DC3's debut album, The Future Sound of Nostalgia, with a new musical backing and slight changes to the lyrics.

== Track listing ==
1. "Get Up Yourself" – 3:52
2. "DC Root's Failure" – 2:49
3. "I Wear My Prescription Sunglasses at Night" – 2:17
4. "Get Up Yourself Part 2" – 5:52
