= DJ Damage =

- Born: Abdul-Quddas
- Origin: PA
- Genres: Media personality Radio Personality Radio DJ hip hop, Turntablism
- Years active: 2007 –present
- Labels: Red Tape Renegades; Unkut Recordings

DJ Damage (born Darren Pearson) is an Australian musician. He started in hip hop culture via breaking and buying records in 1983. DJ Damage was in Brisbane mid 90s hip hop group Towering Inferno, and a member of the Big Rigs six turntable DJ team from the same period. DJ Damage is currently a member of The Optimen. He was a member of the turntablist crew the Terntable Jediz. He is also a member of the Brisbane new jazz and funk band Step It Up.

== History ==
=== Towering Inferno ===
From 1994–7, DJ Damage was a member of Brisbane hip hop group Towering Inferno with Lazy Grey and B-Boy Flex. The members of the group met at Burnt Toast, a jazz/hip hop/funk night in Brisbane, organized by Hams and Felicite. Towering Inferno performed at the first Annual East Coast Funk Festival on 1 July 1995 at Festival Hall, Brisbane. The band also appeared at the first B-Boy Kingdom "all ages hip hop jam", Friday 9 February 1996 at Lighthouse, corner of Ann and Creek Streets, Brisbane. Towering Inferno released a tape called The Toowong Sessions with Brad Strut in 1996. Towering Inferno performed alongside fellow Australian hip hop groups Def Wish Cast (Sydney) and also representatives from Finger Licking Good (Adelaide) and Brethren (Sydney). Bevan Jee, from Bomb Hip Hop Australia, noted in his Towering Inferno article that,

"The name Towering Inferno seems appropriate given the way the group blew up when they first entered the local hip-hop scene. "Fire is a symbol of hip-hop, if you can't cut it you get burnt" say's [sic] Damage the group's DJ."

Tony Mitchell, in his 1998 Glocal subculture paper commented on this quote saying, ". . . although US rap was the inspiration, the local scene caught fire on the fuel that was already there."

=== Big Rigs ===
DJ Damage was also a member of the Big Rigs DJ team with DJ Katch and DJ Frenzie in Brisbane in the mid 1990s. Big Rigs debuted at The Bomb, an FRS (Flavours Radio Show) party held in Brisbane in January 1996. They also played at Vibes on a Summers Day Festival in 1996. DJ Katch, Geoff Jigzaw Boardman (who worked on Towering Inferno's recorded material), Dave Atkins and Chris Bosley went on to form Resin Dogs in 1996. DJ Frenzie mentioned Big Rigs in an interview with The Late Show in 2011, saying that,

"We were doing 6 turntable routines in clubs in the mid 90s. I don't think any one else was doing that kind of thing in Australia at that time".

=== Terntable Jediz ===
DJ Damage was a member of the turntablist crew called Terntable Jediz. The crew is now defunct and all members focused on their own solo careers. The crew was formed in 1998 by DJ Sheep and Krypton. DJ Damage joined in 1999. Other members of the crew included DJ Kenny (Hong Kong)(2001), Finatik (Perth)(2002), DJ Tetsu (Brisbane / Japan) and DJ Freestyle (Brisbane). In 2000, DJ Damage and DJ Sheep toured London, Eindhoven and Berlin and performed at The Social with Yoda and Plus One. They travelled to San Francisco to jam with DJ Qbert, and in 2001, DJ Damage performed a Q&A scratch set with A-Trak in Brisbane. In 2002, DJ Damage was a judge for the DMC Technics World DJ Championships Australian finals. In 2004, DJ Damage was Co-Executive Producer and provided scratches and cuts for the Terntable Jediz' album All Out War released on vinyl by Unkut Recordings.

=== The Optimen ===
In 2001, DJ Damage joined Brisbane hip hop band, The Optimen. Other members of the band include Sammsonite, DATS, Kristoff the Russian, Peter Beaty and DJ Sheep. In 2002, The Optimen released an eight track EP called 02: Breath Control. In November 2005, the band released their album Boomtown. The singles, Give It Up and Mic Induction received high rotation on Triple J Australia's national radio station. The Optimen won two MusicOz Awards in 2006 – The Roland Best Urban Artist Award and The Channel [V] Best Unsigned Video Clip Award for their Give It Up single. In 2010, The Out of Money Experience album was released. It debuted at #36 on the ARIA Urban charts and was Album of the week on Triple J's hip hop show for the week of 19 April 2010. The filmclip for the single 80’s Babies has been played on ABC's Rage programme.

=== DJ work ===
DJ Damage has also played house, funk and soul music at clubs such as The Monastery, Technomadiscotheque, Mantra, Family Nightclub. DJ Damage also performed with VJ Simulcast at the Judith Wright Arts Centre for 2008 Valley Fiesta.

=== Step It Up ===
In 2011 DJ Damage provided cuts and turntablist skills for Brisbane new jazz and funk band Step It Up on their EP, Push.

== Discography ==
=== Compilation Appearances ===
- cuts & instrumentals by Towering Inferno on Blunted Stylus (vinyl) - arranged by DJ Jigzaw
- Jigsaw's Journal by Towering Inferno on Home Brews Volume 2 CD (1997). Track #11 - produced by Geoff Jigsaw (Resin Dogs)
- Cuts on “Such is Life” by Snax - produced by Lazy Grey - from the Culture Of Kings Volume 2 compilation (2002).

=== The Optimen ===
- 02: Breath Control EP (2002)
- Boomtown (2005)
- The Out of Money Experience (2010)

=== Terntable Jediz ===
- All Out War (2004)

=== Step It Up ===
- Push EP (2011)
