= El Questro =

Single by Downsyde

from the album Land of the Giants
- Released: 14 February 2003
- Genre: Australian Hip-Hop
- Length: 4:09
- Label: Hydrofunk/Virgin
- Songwriter(s): Allia, Griffiths, Reutens, Rind, Pizzata, Che
- Producer(s): Fdel

Downsyde singles chronology
"Gifted Life" (2002)	"El Questro" (2003)	"Clap Your Hands" (2003)

"El Questro" is a single by Downsyde from the group's second album, Land of the Giants. It was released in February 2003 on independent label, Hydrofunk, and distributed by Virgin. The original mix version peaked at No. 12 on the ARIA Club Tracks chart in May of that year.

"El Questro" was awarded Most Popular Local Original Music Video at the 2003 West Australian Music Industry Awards and received national airplay on Triple J RTRFM, PBS, 3RRR, and NovaFm. The song was one of the most played Australian songs of 2003 on the station.

== Track listing ==
1. "El Questro" (Allia, Griffiths, Reutens, Rind, Pizzata, Che) – 4:09
2. "El Questro" (Instrumental)
3. "Undefined" (Instrumental)
