= All City =

All City may refer to:

- All City (rap group), a rap music group based in Brooklyn, New York
- All City High, a high school in Rochester, New York
- All City (Downsyde album), 2008
- All City (Northern State album), 2004
- All City Chess Club, a rap music collective founded by Lupe Fiasco
- All City (bike brand)
