= Drapht =

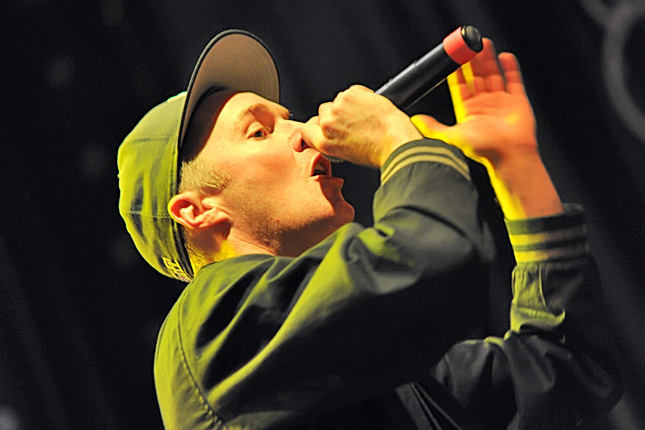
- Drapht at Metro City Concert Club, Perth, May 2011

Background information
- Also known as: Drapht; Paul Reid
- Born: Paul Gary James Ridge; 4 September 1982 (age 44)
- Origin: Mount Hawthorn, Western Australia, Australia
- Genre: Australian hip hop
- Years active: 1998–present
- Labels: Syllabolix; Obese; The Ayems; Ghost Bat Records
- Website: http://drapht.com.au/

Paul Reid, formerly Paul Gary James Ridge, (born 4 September 1982), better known by the stage name Drapht, is an Australian hip hop artist from Perth. Drapht is a member of the Syllabolix (SBX) crew, a collective that includes fellow Perth-based hip hop artists such as Downsyde.

== Biography ==
=== 1982–2002: Early life ===
Drapht grew up in North Perth, Western Australia, a suburb of Perth. His father, Gary Ridge, a jazz drummer introduced Drapht to music from a very young age—he first experienced hip hop at the age of eight. The name "Drapht" is based on a Western Australian Swan Brewery beer, Swan Draught; the company's logo was written on a watch that his father brought home when Drapht was 13 or 14.

Drapht attended Perth Modern School in Subiaco but was not involved in the school's music program. At school he became friends with Damien Allia (aka DJ Armee) who introduced him to hip hop via gigs at the Hyde Park Hotel.

Drapht became a vital part of Perth's hip hop crew, Syllabolix, at the age of 17.

"I was extremely fortunate. Right place, right time. I was right in the middle of it all, I had access to one of the best producers at the time Dazastah, freestyle sessions at Hunter's and constant schooling from the rest of the MC's within the crew. So I was very blessed with it all." — Drapht

This involvement resulted in his first contributions being recorded and included on Hunter and Dazastah's 2000 debut album, Done DL, only months after he had started seriously writing.

=== 2003–2004: Pale Rider ===
Drapht's first track, "Misunderstood", was released as part of the Culture of Kings – Volume 3 release in 2003 with Drapht saying "It was a song I wrote in a span of a day or so, and it was just lying around. So I had the opportunity to put it on Culture of Kings. And then it ended up being the opening track for the release, which was awesome. That definitely helped in the early days of my career."

His debut album, Pale Rider, was released in October 2003, with all production handled by Dazastah (Downsyde), Fdel and Drapht. Special appearances on the album include: Fdel (Invada Records), Downsyde, MC Layla, Hunter, Selekt, Carlsani and Porsah Lane.

"With my first album, around the surrounding time I was fortunate to be hanging out with the Downsyde boys and the rest of SBX who were hugely influential. Essentially I got into music because It really amazed me how Daz [Dazastah] tackled his writing style with his witty punch-lines. Aggression was one thing I wanted to rid myself of though, at that time in my life it was my venting process. An angry teen mad at society, and myself. But we live to grow through that."

— Drapht (2008)

=== 2005–2007: Who Am I ===
The follow-up, 2005's Who Am I, was co-produced by Dazastah (Downsyde) and Fdel, and co-mixed by Drapht with Dazastah. The songs touch on topics including politics, sex, and addiction to drunken antics. Guest appearances on the album include Pressure (Hilltop Hoods), Downsyde, Layla, Pegz (Obese Records), Clandestien, MJ (Funkola) and Hunter. It was released by Obese Records in both in a CD and a limited 2 LP vinyl format. Two tracks from the album, "Drink Drank Drunk" and "The Music", received airplay on Triple J, mostly on the Super Request program. Who Am I is more an introspective album.

"I tried to focus more on my flow and the structure of the tracks but at the end I wasn't really happy with the subject matter of the songs."

— Drapht (2008)

The song, "The Music", was selected by Triple J as a featured track for "AusMusic Month" in 2005. Drapht also released a music video for "The Music", which was shown on Rage. He also performed a guest verse on the track, "The Blue Blooded", which was included on the Hilltop Hoods' 2006 album, The Hard Road.

Drapht has opened for acts such as; Hilltop Hoods, Dilated Peoples, Downsyde, Koolism, Apathy, Rodney P & Skitz, Mystro, Killa Kela, and Resin Dogs.

=== 2008–2009: Brothers Grimm ===
Drapht's third album, Brothers Grimm, was released 10 May 2008, with the first song from the album, "Jimmy Recard", receiving significant airplay on Triple J, where it became the second most played song on the station in 2008

"With Brothers Grimm I focused on my song writing and concepts more than any previous album, also working on my pronunciation and delivery. I set out for it to be more of a personal and truthful account with what I stand for moralistically"

— Drapht (2008)

The album debuted at No. 64 on the ARIA Album charts, reached No. 9 on the AIR (Association of Independent Record Labels) Charts and No. 10 on the ARIA (Australian Recording Industry Association) Top 40 Urban Album charts.

=== 2010–2015: The Life of Riley ===
In an interview with The Vine in November 2010, Drapht advised that he had not renewed his contract with Obese Records and that he will be releasing his forthcoming album The Life of Riley independently. The first song released from the album is "Rapunzel", for which he describes:

The love hate relationship that is Rapunzel- a subject that I had that was extremely close to my heart, so naturally the song itself was one of the easiest to write, but one of the hardest to nail in the recording process. Has to be one of my favourites to date, has made me fall in love with her all over again!

— Drapht

The Life of Riley was released 1 April 2011 and was the first release on Drapht’s own label The Ayems, which is distributed through Sony Music. The album debuted at #1 on the ARIA Album Chart and was the first Australian artist to do so in 2011. The second track to be taken from the album was "Sing It (The Life of Riley)".

=== 2016–present: Seven Mirrors and Arabella Street ===
Drapht released Seven Mirrors in August 2016, which peaked at number 4 on the ARIA Albums Chart.

Arabella Street was released in November 2018.

== Touring ==
In March 2009, Drapht undertook a national tour of Australia with fellow Western Australians, Downsyde with a number of the eastern states performances being supported by Pez. Drapht also made appearances at Homebake, Pyramid Rock Festival, Southbound, Open Arms and MS Fest.

Drapht appeared at the 2011 Groovin' the Moo festival and undertook a national tour to promote the album, with support from Mantra and The Tongue.

Drapht was the opening act for American musical duo Twenty One Pilots during the Australia and New Zealand leg of The Bandito Tour in December 2018.

== Discography ==
Drapht discography
- Studio albums: 5
- Singles: 10

=== Albums ===
Year	Album details	Peak chart positions	Certifications
Year	Album details	AUS	Certifications
Pale Rider	Released: October 2003; Label: Syllabolix (SBX 005); Producer: Dazastah, Fdel, Drapht	—	
Who Am I	Released: June 2005; Label: Obese (OBR032CD); Producer: Dazastah, Fdel, Drapht	—	
Brothers Grimm	Released: 10 May 2008; Label: Obese (OBR57CD); Producer: Trials, Plutonic Lab, M-Phazes, Simplex	64	ARIA: Gold
The Life of Riley	Released: 1 April 2011; Label: The Ayems (AYEMS001); Producer: Trials	1	ARIA: Platinum
Seven Mirrors	Released: 19 August 2016; Label: The Ayems; Producer: Dazastah	4	
Arabella Street	Released: 21 November 2018; Label: The Ayems	—	
Shadows and Shinings	Released: 10 September 2021; Label: The Ayems	22	
"—" denotes release that did not chart

=== Extended plays ===
Year	EPs details	Peak chart positions
Year	EPs details	AUS
A Beautiful Day to Be Lonely	Released: 29 August 2025; Label:	TBA

=== Charted singles ===
Year	Single	AUS			
Year	Single	AUS	Triple J Hottest 100	Certifications	Album
2009	"Jimmy Recard"	92	10	ARIA: 2× Platinum	Brothers Grimm
2009	"Falling" (radio only release)	—	77		Brothers Grimm
2010	"Rapunzel"	16	12	ARIA: 2× Platinum	The Life of Riley
2011	"Sing It (The Life of Riley)" (radio only release)	58	29	ARIA: Gold	The Life of Riley
2011	"Bali Party" (featuring N'fa) (radio only release)	—	74		The Life of Riley
2015	"Dancin' John Doe"	76	130		Seven Mirrors

=== Compilation appearances ===
- Culture of Kings Volume 3 (2003, Obese) (song: "Misunderstood")

=== Other appearances ===
Year	Title	Artist	Album/Single	Label
2000	"Adolescence", "Kids of the Future", "MysticAL Alliance"	Hunter and Dazastah	Done DL	Syllaboliks
2004	"To tha Stumps"	Downsyde	When the Dust Settles	Obese
2005	"Multiple Choice"	Layla	Heretik	Obese
2005	"Last of My Tribe"	High Definition	City of Lights	Mainstream
2006	"The Blue Blooded"	Hilltop Hoods	The Hard Road	Obese
2006	"Rat Race"	Jase	Beat Hedz Volume 1	Obese
2007	"Before I Leave"	Pegz	Burn City	Obese
2008	"Came for the Sound"	Dialectrix	"Cycles of Survival"	Obese
2010	"Where's Elvis?"	M-Phazes	Good Gracious	Obese
2013	"Reservoir Dogs"	Bliss n Eso	Circus in the Sky	Illusive Sounds
2014	"Drama"	Kate Miller-Heidke	"O Vertigo!"	Cooking Vinyl
2014	"Brainbox"	Hilltop Hoods	Walking Under Stars	Golden Era
2019	"Helicobacter High"	Complete	Death Rattle	The Ayems

Alongside many other Australian hip hop artists, Drapht appears in the music video for the Hilltop Hoods song, "Rattling the Keys to the Kingdom" (2012).

== Awards and nominations ==
=== AIR Awards ===
The Australian Independent Record Awards (commonly known informally as AIR Awards) is an annual awards night to recognise, promote and celebrate the success of Australia's Independent Music sector.

Year	Nominee / work	Award	Result
2008	himself	Best New Independent Artis	Nominated
2011	The Life of Riley	Best Independent Album	Nominated
2011	The Life of Riley	Best Independent Hip Hop/Urban Album	Won

=== APRA Awards ===
The APRA Awards are presented annually from 1982 by the Australasian Performing Right Association (APRA), "honouring composers and songwriters". Drapht has been nominated for four awards.

Year	Nominee / work	Award	Result
2011	"Rapunzel" (Paul Reid, Daniel Rankine, Larry Siler)	Urban Work of the Year	Nominated
2012	"Sing It (The Life of Riley)" (Paul Reid, Daniel Rankine)	Urban Work of the Year	Nominated
2012	"Sing It (The Life of Riley)" (Paul Reid, Daniel Rankine)	Breakthrough Songwriter of the Year	Nominated
2013	Paul Reid, Daniel Rankine	Breakthrough Songwriter of the Year	Nominated

=== ARIA Awards ===
The ARIA Music Awards are presented annually from 1987 by the Australian Recording Industry Association (ARIA). In 2011 Drapht won two awards from eight nominations.

Year	Nominee / work	Award	Result
2011	"Rapunzel"	Single of the Year	Nominated
2011	"Rapunzel"	Breakthrough Artist – Single	Nominated
2011	"Rapunzel" – Dave Parkin	Engineer of the Year	Nominated
2011	The Life of Riley	Best Male Artist	Nominated
2011	The Life of Riley	Breakthrough Artist – Album	Nominated
2011	The Life of Riley	Best Urban Album	Won
2011	Drapht	Most Popular Australian Artist	Nominated
2016	Seven Mirrors	Best Urban Album	Won

=== J Award ===
The J Awards are an annual series of Australian music awards that were established by the Australian Broadcasting Corporation's youth-focused radio station Triple J. They commenced in 2005.

Year	Nominee / work	Award	Result
2011	The Life of Riley	Australian Album of the Year	Nominated

=== West Australian Music Industry Awards ===
The West Australian Music Industry Awards (WAMIs) are annual awards presented to the local contemporary music industry, put on annually by the Western Australian Music Industry Association Inc (WAM). Drapht has won two awards.

Year	Nominee / work	Award	Result (wins only)
2009	Drapht	Best Urban/Hip Hop Act	Won
2011	Drapht	Best Urban/Hip Hop Act	Won
