= Lesfortunate =

Single by Downsyde

from the album When The Dust Settles
- B-side: "Bring It Back"
- Released: September 2004
- Genre: Australian Hip-Hop
- Length: 24:03
- Label: Obese Records
- Songwriter(s): Reutens, Griffiths, Cheetham, Rind, Allia
- Producer(s): Dazastah

Downsyde singles chronology
"Clap Your Hands" (2003)	"Lesfortunate" (2004)	"Fortune and Fame" (2008)

"Lesfortunate" a song from the Downsyde's, released as the lead single from their third album When The Dust Settles in September 2004, prior to the album's release in December, with the various tracks also available as a download from the iTunes Store and the group's website.

The song contains strong lyrics, sympathizing about the 'less fortunate' people in the world and the plight in which they are in.

Both "Lesfortunate" and "Bring It All Back" received airplay on Triple J, and Nova. A video for the song was also produced (view here) which received airplay on rage and VideoHits.

== Track listing ==
1. "Lesfortunate" (Reutens, Griffiths, Cheetham, Rind, Allia) - 4:10
2. "Bring It All Back" (Reutens, Griffiths, Cheetham, Rind, Allia) - 3:32
3. "Best Kept Secret" (remix) (Millis, Griffiths, Reutens, Rind, Allia) - 3:40
4. "Mexican" (Reutens) - 5:05
5. "Clap Your Hands" (Reutens, Griffiths, Cheetham, Rind, Allia) - 3:20
6. "Lesfortunate" (instrumental) - 4:16
7. "Best Kept Secret" (instrumental) - 3:40
