= A-Love =

Australian musician (born 1983)

- Also known as: A-Love
- Born: Antonella Formosa; 21 March 1983 (age 43); Rome, Italy
- Origin: Melbourne, Australia
- Genres: Soul, Hip hop
- Instruments: Vocals
- Labels: Duality Records; Crookneck Records

A-Love is a female Australian-based MC from Melbourne. Her debut album, Ace of Hearts was nominated 'Best Urban Release' in the ARIA Music Awards of 2008.

== Biography ==
A-Love was born Antonella Formosa in Rome, Italy on 21 March 1983. Formosa's father is Ric Formosa, a composer/arranger and an original member (lead guitarist) with the Australian band Little River Band and her mother, Vicki Formosa, was an R&B singer.

My earliest memories are of my Dad carting me around to different studios to these sessions, and playing on pool tables in old studios.

— Antonella Formosa

She attended Hawthorn Secondary College, graduating in 1999. Whilst her first experiences of playing music were with an all-female band, which never made any public performances, she also discovered hip hop in high school and soon found herself waxing lyrical over beats.

Rest assured, if I was a better singer, I'd be a soul singer! [MCing] was just something that I fell in love with in my teens. I've always been heavily into lyricism, no matter what kind of musical style I've been interested in. The fact that hip hop let you just not mince words and be really direct and cram so much more content and originality into your lyrics than singing was the biggest thing for me.

— Antonella Formosa

In January 2000, Formosa met Draino from the Puah Hedz. He was keen to check out her writing and despite her reluctance, he made her feature on a track. The second track that she had ever recorded was with Muphin, which later became "Some People" which featured on the album Despite the Odds. She has since appeared numerous times on Triple J's 'The Hip Hop Show', PBS' 'The Formula' (now 'Hittin Switches') and 'Auscultation', RRR's 'Wordburner' and RMIT University's SRA FM. She was progressing towards a Bachelor of Arts degree in Anthropology from La Trobe University and for two years she was the co-host of a hip hop radio show at La Trobe University.

May 2002 marked A-Love's official solo introduction to the Australian hip hop and media circles, with her song "Petty" from the album, Culture of Kings Volume 2 (the first ever Australian hip hop feature album on Triple J). "Petty" was put on medium rotation on Triple J.

Formosa was a winner of the Nescafe Big Break competition in 2002, earning $20,000 with which to start up an independent record label and distribution company, Duality Records. As time progressed, she juggled the twin responsibilities of building a label and working on her own debut as an artist.

I really concentrated on getting the admin and strategic side of the label going, but it just proved to be a bit too hard. I knew that it was either gonna be the music that went or the label – which is where we are now.

— Antonella Formosa

Formosa released her debut album, Ace of Hearts on 24 November 2007, on Crookneck Records. The album was produced by BVA (Mnemonic Ascent) with additional beats from Suffa (Hilltop Hoods) and Jase. Guests include Yungun (UK), Raph (Mnemonic Ascent), Spikey Tee (UK) and emerging indigenous MC Jim Blah. It was Triple J's 'Album of the Week' just three days after its release and was nominated for the 2008 ARIA Awards in the category of 'Best Urban Release'.

The minute that I stepped in the studio with BVA I knew the time was right to record this album. I felt hungry and inspired again, it all fell in place. The result is a bunch of songs with lasting sentiment; real stories about real life.

— Antonella Formosa

She was also nominated for two at the Jägermeister AIR (Australian Independent Record Labels Association) Awards in 2008, in the categories of 'Best New Independent Artist' and 'Best Independent Hip Hop Artist'.

Formosa has performed with Mystik Journeymen (US), Anticon, Hilltop Hoods, Pegz, MC Layla, Kowhai, Bliss n Eso, Scarz on 45, MC Que, TZU, Bias B and DJ Brand (Canada).

== Awards ==
=== AIR Awards ===
The Australian Independent Record Awards (commonly known informally as AIR Awards) is an annual awards night to recognise, promote and celebrate the success of Australia's Independent Music sector.

Year	Nominee / work	Award	Result
2008	A-Love	Best New Independent Artist	Nominated
2008	Ace of Hearts	Best Independent Hip Hop Album	Nominated

== Discography ==
=== Albums ===
- Ace of Hearts – Crookneck Records/Shogun Distribution (November 2007)

=== Contributions ===
- Get The Picture? – Draino ("Out of Place") – Puah Head Constructions (2000)
- Despite the Odds – ("Some People") – Puah Head Constructions (2000)
- Culture of Kings – Volume 2 ("Petty") – Obese Records (2002)
- Obesecity – ("Rapunzal") – Obese Records (2002)
- Straight from the Art... – ("Movin'") – Warner Music (2003)
- Straight from the Art 2 – ("Captains of...") – Warner Music (2004)
- The Enthusiast – Evil Ed ("Captains of...") – Janomi (2004)
- Beat the Hedz Vol 1 – Jase ("Sincerely Yours") – Obese Records (2006)
- Diggi Down Unda – Mystro ("The Beaches") – Grindin Records (2006)
- Good Vibrations 2008 – ("So Easy") – Universal Music (2008)
