= Fluent Form =

Flu
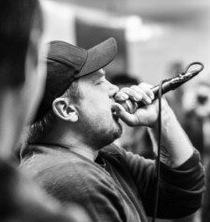

Background information
- Also known as: Fluent Form
- Born: Ryan Stewart; South eastern suburbs, Melbourne, Australia
- Genres: Hip hop
- Years active: 2006–present
- Label: Crate Cartel

Ryan Stewart, better known by the stage name Fluent Form or, more recently, Flu, is an Australian rapper and hip hop musician.

== Career ==
=== Solo career ===
Although Stewart participated in rap battles in his early days, using the experience to gain exposure and get his name out, he has said that he was never really part of the "battle scene" and his dedication is to recording songs.

His independent debut production, Chapters of Substance, was released in 2008 under the name Fluent Form. This was quickly followed the next year by The Furnace, released under the newly formed Crate Cartel label and distributed through Obese Records. Described by an interviewer as "a dark manifesto, serving as an outlet for rage and dissatisfaction", he said that The Furnace reflects his "burning desires, rage, ... life, lessons, greed, envy, growth, anger, obstacles, reward, death, life... everything." He was praised for his "complex rhyming structure, deep concepts, and overall flow" and as having "the composure of a veteran long in the game." In an interview, he said that telling personal stories through the tracks on the album was "very important".

His third album, Word Merchant, released in 2011, was produced by Crate Cartel co-founder Geko and featured guest verses from various artists including Dialectrix and numerous veterans in the local hip hop scene. Throughout 2012, he released the tracks "FLU32" and "Ricochet Rabbit" via Bandcamp and appeared on the Obese Records Obesecity 2 compilation with the track "The Code" featuring Has-Lo.

His fourth solo album, Flu Season, was released in 2013 and debuted at number 39 on the Aria Hip Hop Charts. It again featured a host of guest artists including American rappers One Be Lo and Has-Lo. This marked his first release to be issued in vinyl and on cassette tape in addition to CD. He stated that he hope the style of Flu Season "gives the listener an opportunity to digest everything I’m saying." It won awards in the 2013 at the Oz Hip Hop Awards for best album and best wax release, as well as best beat for the track "Arrows" featuring Geko, which was produced by Must Volkoff. The Australian edition of Rolling Stone magazine reviewed Flu Season, awarding it 3 1/2 stars. A review on US website RapReviews.com complimented Flu's "ear popping lines" and production that "lifts him up high", rating the album 8 out of 10.

In 2017, he released his fifth album Flu Dust, which was his first self-produced album as well as being his first album since officially moving on from the name Fluent Form to simply Flu, which was considered his secondary stage name for many years prior.

Fluent Form has toured Australia, supporting international artists including Ghostface Killah, Ill Bill, Chino XL, Masta Ace and DJ Premier. He has also provided guest verses for local artists including Bias B, Ciecmate and Bigfoot. He also produced the track "Half Full" by J.Mac, appearing on the compilation album Rawthentic The Roster.

=== 4 Aces ===
Having worked with fellow Melbourne-based rappers Mata, Must and 1/6 on the tracks "4 Aces" (released on The Furnace) and "Poison" (on Flu Season), they appeared on stage around Australia in 2013 as part of the Alliance Tour and produced an EP titled Four Aces, a collaboration between the Crate Cartel and Pang Productions labels, released exclusively on vinyl to coincide with World Record Store Day on 19 April 2014. They also performed a live gig that night outside Wax Museum Records in the Campbell Arcade subway under Flinders Street railway station.

== Discography ==
=== Albums and EPs ===
Title	Released	Label	Format
Chapters of Substance	2008	Independent	CD
The Furnace	2009	Crate Cartel	CD
Word Merchant	2011	Crate Cartel	CD
Flu Season	2013	Crate Cartel	CD, vinyl, cassette
Four Aces (with Mata, Must and 1/6)	2014	Crate Cartel and Pang Productions	Vinyl
Flu Dust	2017	Crate Cartel	CD, vinyl, cassette

=== Individual tracks ===
- "FLU32" (2012)
- "Ricochet Rabbit" (2012)

=== Guest verses ===
Title	Artists	Release	Release date
"Street Journalists"	Requiem featuring Fluent Form and Maundz	Grassroots Anarchy	2009
"Comin' to Getcha"	Dialectrix featuring Fluent Form, Maundz and Rigby	Audio Projectile	2010
"March the 5th"	Maundz featuring Fluent Form	Mr. Nobody	2010
"Officially Active"	Myk Reid featuring Fluent Form, Sesh Budsa and Geko	Rise of the Foot Soldier	2011
"After One Listen"	Ciecmate featuring Fluent Form	Chess Sounds Vol 1	2011
"Nothin'"	Geko and Aetcix featuring Fluent Form	Goatmob	2011
"The Code"	Fluent Form featuring Has-Lo	Obesecity 2	2012
"Locomotive"	Maundz featuring Fluent Form and Fatty Phew	Take It Back Mixtape	2012
"Out Of Sync (Xanax Rap)"	Ghosts in the Room featuring Fluent Form	Ghosts in the Room	2012
"Mercy Killings"	Jake Biz featuring Fluent Form, Ken Oath, Tornts and Bigfoot	Commercial Hell	2012
"Haggis"	Force featuring Sparts and Fluent Form	Force	2013

== Personal life ==
Flu was raised and continues to reside in the south eastern suburbs of Melbourne. He is a father of two children.

He also played for the Eastside Kings in the Robert Hunter Cup in 2013, an Australian rules football match honouring the memory of Perth MC Hunter.
