= Brothers Grimm (album) =

Studio album by Drapht
- Released: May 18, 2008
- Genre: Hip hop
- Length: 58:30
- Label: Obese
- Producer: Trials, Plutonic Lab, Simplex, and M-Phazes

Drapht chronology
Who Am I (2005)	Brothers Grimm (2008)	The Life of Riley (2011)

Singles from Brothers Grimm
- 1. "Jimmy Recard" Released: April 2008

Professional ratings
Review scores
Source	Rating
PerthBands.com	(not rated)
Planet Urban	(not rated)
In The Mix	(not rated)
The Dwarf.com	(not rated)
Rave Magazine	(not rated)
Rapreviews	link

Brothers Grimm is the third album from Western Australian hip hop artist, Drapht. It was released in May 2008 through Australian hip hop label, Obese Records. The album features contributions by Dazastah (Downsyde), Ciecmate (Hospice Crew), Trials & Porsah Laine.

The album debuted at No. 64 on the ARIA Album charts, reached No. 9 on the V Energy AIR (Association of Independent Record Labels) Charts and No. 10 on the ARIA (Australian Recording Industry Association) Top 40 Urban Album charts.

"Originally when I started thinking about putting a new record out, I felt like I wanted to start from scratch again and not put anything else out under the name Drapht. So from the beginning it was the crew name - myself and Trials were the Brothers Grimm. The name itself has no bearing on the actual album's content; it's just the two people involved with it."

— Drapht (2008)

The first single from the album, "Jimmy Recard" has received airplay on radio stations across Australia. In an interview with Triple J, Drapht explained how he came up with the name.

I was thinking of successful names so I jumped on the net and actually googled successful names and came up with James and Recard. So I changed James to Jimmy and used Recard as the last name. I think a name does a lot for a character and where you go in life. And it was a positive track on the record because a lot of my stuff kind of feeds from negative ideas.

"Jimmy Recard" and "Falling" both appeared in Triple J's Hottest 100 for 2008 at No. 10 and No. 77 respectively. The song "Don't Wanna Work" appeared in the SBS comedy series "Swift and Shift Couriers".

== Track listing ==
All tracks are written by Paul Ridge (aka Drapht).

Brothers Grimm
No.	Title	Length
1.	"Intro" (arranged by Drapht and Dazastah and produced by M-Phazes)	1:26
2.	"Falling*"	3:41
3.	"The Money" (featuring Porsah Laine and produced by M-Phazes)	4:27
4.	"Insomnia"	3:13
5.	"Jimmy Recard"	3:33
6.	"Dreams & Dreamers"	5:17
7.	"A Good Year"	3:46
8.	"Boom Boom Boom"	3:48
9.	"Sound Man"	4:34
10.	"Don't Wanna Work" (arranged by Drapht and Dazastah and produced by M-Phazes)	3:31
11.	"Rest In Peace" (featuring Dazastah, Ciecmate & Trials and produced by Plutonic Lab)	4:16
12.	"Where Yah From"	3:52
13.	"Put On A Record" (produced by Simplex)	4:44
14.	"Lost"	4:19
15.	"Lose Control" (featuring Porsah Laine)	4:01

== Credits ==
- M-Phazes — producer (tracks 1, 3 & 10)
- Plutonic Lab — producer (track 11)
- Simplex — producer (track 13)
- Trials — producer
- Neville Clark — mastering
- Dash — artwork

== Notes ==
- 'Falling' has since been removed from all copies of the album due to a copyright dispute.

== Certifications ==
Region	Certification	Certified units/sales
Australia (ARIA)	Gold	35,000^{‡}
^{‡} Sales+streaming figures based on certification alone.
