= Brothers Stoney =

Australian hip hop group

Brothers Stoney is an Australian hip hop group hailing from Brisbane, Queensland. The crew comprises emcees Lazy Grey and Len One. Both Lazy Grey and Len One are members of the Brisbane hip hop crew, 750 Rebels.

== History ==
=== Boney & Stoney ===
Lazy Grey and Len One, along with Melbourne MC Bias B, were in a crew called Boney & Stoney. Boney & Stoney released a self-titled EP in 1999, which has become known as one of the top pioneering releases of Australian hip hop. It was rated as the number 1 Australian hip hop 12" record by Melbourne-based DJ/producer Doc Felix.

The group reformed for individual performances in more recent years, including a show in Perth in December 2010 and at a gig forming part of the Robert Hunter Cup in Melbourne in October 2012 in memory of MC Hunter.

=== Brothers Stoney ===
Brothers Stoney have played at Livid Festival (2001), Good Vibrations Festival (2004) and performed alongside artists such as Native Ryme Syndicate (2001). Brothers Stoney have had airplay on Australian radio programs and stations such as national broadcaster Triple J, Melbourne station 3RRR, and Brisbane station 4ZZZ.

=== Lazy Grey ===
Lazy Grey was in a Brisbane band called Towering Inferno with DJ Damage and B-Boy Flex in 1994–1997. The group performed at the first B-Boy Kingdom hip hop jam in 1996. Lazy Grey has collaborated with artists such as Brisbane band, Resin Dogs (Hi Fidelity Dirt album, 2003), Bias B, Brad Strut, Pegz, Tornts. Lazy Grey's musical style has been described as Ocker hip hop by Tony Mitchell in his paper "The Reography of Reason: Australian Hip Hop as Experimental History and Pedagogy":

"'Ocker' hip hop is mainly Anglo-Australian, insists on using a broad Australian accent, with frequent swearing and recourse to Australian slang, decries MCs who rap with an American accent as 'wack' (ridiculous) and often celebrates aspects of Anglo-Australian working class culture like barbecues, sport and pubs. Prominent exponents include Hilltop Hoods, Brisbane’s Lazy Grey and Perth-based MC Layla."

OzHipHop.com's hip hop music reviewer, gerling in her review of Lazy Grey's The Soundtrack album, noted that,

"Lazy Grey has lost none of his frustrated verbal elegance, and with 'The Soundtrack' he proves that he is one of Oz hip hop's pre-eminent MCs. His diction is crisp, his flow is effortless and he can still write intricate, clever rhymes".

== Discography ==
=== Albums ===
==== Boney & Stoney ====
Boney & Stoney (1999)

==== Brothers Stoney ====
Stone Broke (2003)

Tappin Buttons (Instrumentals) (2004)

==== Lazy Grey ====
On Tap (with Len-one) (Cassette only) (1997)

On or Off Tap (1998)

Banned in Queensland (2004)

The Soundtrack (2009)

==== Len-one (AKA Lenwun) ====
Begged, Borrowed or Stolen (2006) (with DJ DCE)
