= Hunter (rapper) =

Australian rapper

MC Hunter
- Birth name: Robert Alan Hunter
- Also known as: Hunter, Huntz, MC Hunter, Hunter SBX
- Born: 1 October 1975; Perth, Western Australia, Australia
- Died: 20 October 2011 (aged 36)
- Genres: Hip-hop
- Years active: 1990–2011
- Labels: Syllabolix, Obese
- Website: www.huntersbx.com

Robert Alan Hunter (1 October 1975 – 20 October 2011), better known as Hunter or Huntz, was an Australian rapper and hip-hop artist. He was a founder of Perth's hip hop scene in the 1990s and a member of the MC collective Syllabolix (SBX) Crew. During his career, he released four albums: Done DL (2002), Going Back to Yokine (2006), Monster House (2010) and Fear and Loathing (2011).

Hunter died of neuroendocrine cancer in 2011 at the age of 36. He was post-humously inducted into the Western Australian Music Industry Awards Hall of Fame and was the subject of a documentary titled Hunter: For the Record (see below) which recorded the final years of his life. The anniversary of his death was commemorated by an "AUS All Star" gig and an inaugural Australian rules match, named the Robert Hunter Cup in his honour, both events which brought together members of the hip hop community from across Australia (see below).

== Biography ==
=== Early life ===
Robert Alan Hunter was born on 1 October 1975 and grew up in Yokine, a Perth suburb, with his father, Bob, his mother, Trish, and his sister, Simonne. He was known for writing raps about his home and life.

=== Career ===
In the 1990s Hunter emerged as a battle MC and hip hop artist. Hunter, and fellow Perth-based hip hop artists, established the MC collective Syllabolix (SBX) Crew. In 2002, Hunter's song "Jam Roll", produced by Optamus, was included on the Obese Records compilation, Culture of Kings Volume 2. In the same year, his song "Wake Up" was included on the Obese compilation Obesecity. On 10 May 2002, Hunter's first album, Done DL, was released in collaboration with Downsyde's Dazastah on the Syllabolix label via Obese Records. In 2006, Hunter and his partner, Laura, became the parents of a son, Marley.

On 1 June 2006, his second album, Going Back to Yokine, followed. His song, "The Big Issue", was released on the 2006 Kiss my WAMi audio CD and audio jukebox DVD for the 2006 West Australian Music Industry Awards Festival after he was nominated for an award that year. His next album, Monster House was issued in 2010, he collaborated with Sydney-based DJ Vame. Hunter's fourth album, Fear and Loathing – with SBX member Roy Mortimer aka Mortar – was issued in May 2011.

== Personal life ==
=== Cancer diagnosis ===
In November 2009, Hunter was diagnosed with terminal neuroendocrine cancer. He wrote: "I was diagnosed with cancer. Neuroendocrine tumours on the pancreas with metastasis to liver... I was devo'd of course as this is pretty much a death sentence."

The news generated support from the Australian hip hop community and, in November 2010, a charity eBay auction was organised by fellow MCs, Bias B and Len One called Heat 4 Huntz to raise money to help Hunter and his son.

=== Death ===
Hunter died of his cancer on 20 October 2011, aged 36. In August, one of Hunter's last live shows was at the Railway Hotel, with Mortar, performing the entire Fear and Loathing album.

At the time of his death, Hunter was working on a charity album in support of youth cancer organisation, CanTeen. The album, Australian Hip Hop Supports CanTeen, was released on 2 December 2011, and completed with the help of fellow SBX crew member, Dazastah. It includes songs from Hunter, Hilltop Hoods, Drapht, Downsyde, Koolism, Bias B and Hermitude.

Hunter is survived by his 5-year-old son, Marley, his partner, Laura, his mother, Trish, and his sister, Simonne.

=== Faith ===
As expressed in his song I asked God from the album Bring it All Back, Hunter was a Christian, although not much regarding his faith is known.

== Legacy ==
=== Influence ===
Hunter was an influence on Australian hip hop artists such as Drapht, who had been included on Hunter's 2002 Done DL album, after writing raps secretly "for three or four months" and showing them to Hunter. Hunter had been in Drapht's sister's class at school, and Drapht had seen him perform at the Hyde Park Hotel along with Dazastah and Downsyde. Drapht helped raise funds for cancer research based on his friendship with Hunter in the 2011 Dry July fundraiser.

=== Awards ===
At the 2012 Western Australian Music Industry Awards Hunter was post-humously inducted into the WAM Hall of Fame.

=== Hunter: For the Record ===
A documentary entitled Hunter: For the Record was made about his career and battle with cancer. The documentary's premiere screening was at the Australian Centre for the Moving Image in Melbourne on 27 October 2012, with a second screening in Perth on 1 November 2012. In a Q&A session following the premiere, the producers stated that they intend to screen the documentary at film festivals in the following year, and that the documentary would be released on DVD with additional material that was left out due to time constraints.

=== Robert Hunter Cup ===
Melbourne MC Bias B and other members of the hip-hop community planned two events to commemorate Hunter's legacy, both events falling under the name Robert Hunter Cup. On Saturday, 20 October 2012, a year after Hunter death, a gig was staged in Melbourne featuring artists including Drapht, Dazastah, Layla and Optamus from the Syllabolix (SBX) crew, Funkoars, Brad Strut, Koolism, Boney & Stoney, amongst others.

The following day, an Australian rules football match was played between two teams, Westside Warriors (with players from Western Australia and South Australia) and Eastside Kings (from the states on the east coast), to raise funds for charity foundation Make-A-Wish. The event which was inspired by an impromptu "kick-to-kick" game at a wake near the Melbourne Cricket Ground at the time of Hunter's death. The Eastside Kings (7.8.50) defeated the Westside Warriors (7.4.46) by four points; comedian Scott Dooley was awarded a trophy as "man of the match".

Westside Warriors

- 00 Dazastah
- 1 Defyre
- 2 Cam McDonald
- 3 Deej
- 4 Rodrick
- 5 Drapht
- 6 Javs
- 7 Rob Shaker
- 8 Optamus (captain)
- 9 Creed Birch
- 10 Scott Bono
- 11 Mr Grevis
- 12 Simplex
- 13 Vents
- 14 Flak
- 15 Lukic
- 16 Conseps
- 17 Paul Salta
- 18 Armee
- 19 Adam Crook
- 20 John Stoitis
- 21 Kai
- 22 Matt Garood
- 23 MJ
- 24 Bitter Belief
- 25 LJ
- 26 Pressure
- 27 Trumps
- 29 John Garood
- 30 Todd Nash (coach)
- 36 RichoKidd
- 64 L Street
- 69 Hons
- 75 Mortar
- 77 Beats
- 99 Reflux

Eastside Kings

- 0 Maundz
- 1 Hau Latukefu
- 2 Jessie Lyons
- 3 Trem (captain)
- 4 Brad Strut
- 5 Discourse
- 7 Fluent Form
- 8 Crispy
- 9 Briggs
- 10 Troy Skarz
- 11 Bigspin
- 12 Guy Geezy
- 13 Ryhno
- 15 Bigfoot
- 16 Heata
- 17 Dwiz
- 18 Josh Davis
- 20 A-Love
- 22 G Force
- 23 Surreal
- 25 Swarmy
- 29 Scott Dooley
- 30 Eloquor
- 31 Ozi Batla
- 32 Dedlee
- 33 Deece
- 35 Reason
- 40 B Wiv
- 44 Tornts
- 45 Chris Gill
- 69 Illergic
- 75 Stewbakka (coach)
- 77 Urthboy
- 85 J Stark
- 87 Mitus
- 88 Bias B

The event was repeated the following year, with the Robert Hunter Cup match played at Victoria Park, Melbourne, on Sunday, 6 October 2013, preceded by another "Aus All Stars" gig the night before. Eastside Kings (8.8.56) again defeated Westside Warriors (7.7.49).

The final Robert Hunter Cup match played in Perth, Western Australia, on 25 October 2014 ended with another victory for the Eastside Kings (8.11. 59) over the Westside Warriors (7.8.50).

== Discography ==
=== Studio albums ===
- Done DL - Hunter and Dazastah - Syllabolix / Obese Records (10 May 2002)
- Going Back to Yokine - Hunter (solo album) - Syllabolix (1 June 2006)
- Monster House - Hunter and DJ Vame (2010)
- Fear and Loathing - Hunter and Mortar – Obese Records CLND004 (6 May 2011)
- Australian Hip Hop Supports CanTeen Compilation, Hunter plus various Australian hip hop artists – SBX for Charity Hiphopcan001 (2 December 2011)
- "Bring it All Back" - Hunter - Syllabolix (4 October 2013)

=== Extended plays ===
- Lucky Matt's Tatts – Hunter (solo EP) – Obese Records (2005)

=== Contributions ===
- "Jam Roll" song on Culture of Kings Volume 2 - Obese Records (2002)
- "Wake Up" song on Obesecity - Obese Records (2002)
- "The Big Issue" song on Kiss My WAMi CD and audio DVD - Western Australia Music Industry (2006)
