= Gifted Life =

Single by Downsyde

from the album Land of the Giants
- B-side: "Reap What We Sow"
- Released: September 2002
- Genre: Australian Hip-Hop
- Label: Hydrofunk/Virgin
- Songwriter(s): Downsyde
- Producer(s): Dazastah

Downsyde singles chronology
"Gifted Life" (2002)	"El Questro" (2004)

"Gifted Life" is the first single from Australian hip hop group Downsyde's second album Land of the Giants. It was released on 23 September 2002 on the independent label, Hydrofunk (established by Resin Dogs) and distributed nationally by Virgin.

The song basically revolves around the concept that some people have a blessed (or gifted) life, while others are not so fortunate. Three other songs are also included on the retail single: "Reap What We Sow", "Dee Dah Dah" (an interlude type track), and "Raiders of the Lost Art", all from the group's debut album Epinonimous and all produced or co-produced by Dazastah.

"Gifted Life" was nominated as 'Best Single' at the 2003 Australian Dance Music Awards, which was eventually won by Infusion's "Dead Souls". The song featured on the 2003 DMA compilation album, it received airplay around on Triple J, RTRFM, 3RRR, 4ZZZ and PBS.

== Track listing ==
1. "Gifted Life" – 3:38
2. "Reap What We Sow" – 4:52
3. "Dee Dah Dah" –
4. "Raiders of the Lost Art" – 4:49
