= Land of the Giants (album) =

Studio album by Downsyde
- Released: 17 February 2003
- Recorded: 2002
- Genre: Australian hip-hop
- Length: 42:18
- Label: Virgin/Hydrofunk
- Producer: Downsyde

Downsyde chronology
Epinonimous (2000)	Land of the Giants (2003)	When The Dust Settles (2004)

Land of the Giants is the second album from the Western Australian hip hop group, Downsyde. It was released through Virgin/Hydrofunk Records on 17 February 2003. It peaked at No. 6 on the ARIA Hitseekers Albums chart. Guests on the album included DJ Fdel and Porsah Laine.

The first single lifted from the album was "Gifted Life", which included tracks from their debut album Epinonimous. The single preceded the album and was released in September 2002. "Gifted Life" together with "El Questro" received extensive airplay on national youth radio, Triple J.

The album won 'Most Popular Local Original Album' at the 2003 Western Australian Music Industry Awards.

== Reception ==
Professional ratings
Review scores
Source	Rating
WAMi review	(not rated)
AMO review	(not rated)
Triple J listener reviews	(not rated)

== Track listing ==
All songs written by Damien Allia, Shahbaz Rind, D. Reutens, Scott Griffiths and Mat Cheetham, unless otherwise noted.

1. "Undefined" - 3:27
2. "Bitter Sweet" (Damien Allia, D. Reutens, Scott Griffiths, Shahbaz Rind, Salvatore Pizzata) - 2:56
3. "Gifted Life" (Damien Allia, D. Reutens, Scott Griffiths, Shahbaz Rind, Salvatore Pizzata, Che) - 3:38
4. "El Questro" (featuring Porsah Laine) (Damien Allia, D. Reutens, Scott Griffiths, Shahbaz Rind, Salvatore Pizzata, Che) - 4:07
5. "Land Of The Giants (Pt1)" - 0:42
6. "Did You Know" - 3:26
7. "Robust" - 3:17
8. "Hot Days, Cold Nights" - 5:10
9. "Keep It Alive" - 4:00
10. "Kingswood Country" (Scott Griffiths, Shahbaz Rind, Damien Allia, D. Reutens) - 4:40
11. "Neva Enough" - 3:55
