= Ron Rude =

- Born: 24 October 1956 (age 70); Melbourne, Australia
- Genre: Post-punk

Ron Rude (born 24 October 1956) is a rock and roll musician in Melbourne, Australia. He was one of the first Australian indie musicians to self record and release their own material, which he did with the release of his first album The Borders of Disgrace in 1979 and is considered to be a pioneer of DIY recording. Rude was also part of the post punk "little band scene" that flourished in Melbourne in the late 1970s to 1980s. He staged a hunger strike in the window of local record shop Missing Link, and demanded that local radio station 3XY played his records, threatening to drown himself in a bucket of water if they did not.

From the years 2001 to 2003, the hunger strike was the subject of a play called 3XY Or I Die. Since 2001, Rude has been performing new material with a band called the Ron Rude Renaissance.

== Discography ==
=== Albums ===
- The Borders of Disgrace (1979)
- The Golden Nowhere (1984) - Cassette album, only 10 copies released due to market withdrawal.

==== With Piano Piano ====
- The Vorpal Blade (1980)

==== With The Renaissance ====
- Ron Rude Loves Ya (2010)

=== Singles ===
- "Cauldron of Rebirth/Houseboat" (1982) - Cassette single.

==== With Piano Piano ====
- Piano Piano/The Chessmen's Excursion (1980)

==== With The Renaissance ====
- Midnight Shadow (2010)

=== Production credits ===
| Year | Album | Artist | Label | Notes |
|---|---|---|---|---|
| 1980 | Centrefold/Window 7" | Microfilm | Unforgettable Music through Missing Link | |
| 1980 | Honeymoons/123 Factory 7" | The Fabulous Marquises | Unforgettable Music through Missing Link | |
| 1981 | From Belgrave With Love | Various artists | Cleopatra Records | Daily Planet, The Ears, Lachelle, Lisa Gerrard, The Marquises, Microfilm, Microtechs, Steve Vanguard, Vicky Hayes, The Video Pirates |
