= The Life of Riley (album) =

Studio album by Drapht
- Released: 1 April 2011
- Recorded: 2011
- Genre: Australian hip hop
- Label: The Ayems

Drapht chronology
Brothers Grimm (2008)	The Life of Riley (2011)	Seven Mirrors (2016)

The Life of Riley is the fourth album by Australian hip hop artist, Drapht. The songs were recorded in Drapht's home studio and was released in April 2011 on Drapht's own label The Ayems. The album debuted at number 1 on the ARIA Albums Chart. The album features contributions from Briggs, N'fa, Funkoars and Urthboy. Drapht believes that this album was the toughest project in his career.

At the J Awards of 2011, the album was nominated for Australian Album of the Year.

== Track listing ==
No.	Title	Length
1.	"Intro"	0:16
2.	"Sing It (The Life of Riley)"	4:06
3.	"Down"	4:22
4.	"Rapunzel"	3:22
5.	"The Eulogy" (featuring Briggs)	0:56
6.	"R.I.P J.R"	3:47
7.	"Won't Listen When"	2:55
8.	"People Don't Know"	3:58
9.	"Bali Party" (featuring N'fa)	3:03
10.	"Skit"	1:43
11.	"Air Guitar"	3:44
12.	"The Paul the Dan" (featuring Trials)	3:13
13.	"Murder Murder"	3:56
14.	"Take the Party with Us" (featuring Funkoars)	4:52
15.	"Good Morning"	4:07
16.	"We Own the Night" (featuring Mantra and Urthboy)	4:13
17.	"On and On"	4:00
18.	"Good Morning" (Elgusto Remix) (iTunes bonus track)	3:39

== Charts ==
=== Weekly charts ===
Chart (2011)	Peak position
Australian Albums (ARIA)	1

=== Year-end charts ===
Chart (2011)	Position
Australian Albums (ARIA)	42

== Certifications ==
Region	Certification	Certified units/sales
Australia (ARIA)	Platinum	70,000^{^}
^{^} Shipments figures based on certification alone.
