= Canteen (charity) =

Cancer support organization in Australia

Canteen is an Australian not-for-profit cancer charity that provides free and tailored support to young people aged 12–25 who are impacted by cancer. Whether they are dealing with their own diagnosis, a close family member's cancer or the death of a loved one, Canteen provides a wide range of free support services to help them overcome the specific challenges they're dealing with. Canteen also provides services for parents dealing with cancer in their family. The CEO of Canteen is Siona Hardy.

== Background ==
Canteen was founded in 1985 by a group of young cancer patients. The organisation was created to address the unique challenges faced by adolescents and young adults during and after cancer treatment. Today, young people continue to play a role in governance through advisory groups and leadership positions on the Canteen Board of Directors.

== Support Services ==
Canteen supports young people dealing with cancer to:

- Connect with peers in similar situations through programs and recreation days.
- Understand what cancer means by providing access to free information and resources.
- Access online and face-to-face counselling.
- Join a 24/7 online support community of peers via Canteen Connect.
- If they've been diagnosed themselves, it provides Youth Cancer Services which are specialised treatment and support services based in major hospitals throughout Australia.

== Events ==
=== Bandanna Day ===
Held on the last Thursday of October each year, Bandanna Day is the flagship fundraising and awareness campaign for Canteen. Since Bandanna Day began it has raised more than $35 million to support young people impacted by cancer. Individuals, schools and organisations can get involved by buying and selling bandannas.

== Partnerships ==
=== Youth Cancer Services ===
Specialist treatment and support for young people with cancer aged 15–25 is provided by the Youth Cancer Services (YCS) based in major hospitals throughout Australia.

=== Cancer Hub ===
The Cancer Hub is a collaboration between Canteen, Red Kite and Camp Quality, to support families with children or young people aged 0–25 who are impacted by any cancer.
