= When the Dust Settles =

Studio album by Downsyde
- Released: December 2004
- Recorded: 2004
- Genre: Hip-hop
- Length: 69:16
- Label: Obese
- Producer: Optamus, Dazastah, Cheeky, Armee

Downsyde chronology
| Land of the Giants (2003) | When the Dust Settles (2004) | All City (2008) |

Professional ratings
Review scores
| Source | Rating |
|---|---|
| AMO Review | link |
| Cyclic Defrost | January 2005 |
| In The Mix | January 2005 |

When the Dust Settles is the third full-length album from Australian hip-hop group, Downsyde and was released in December 2004 through Obese Records. It was produced by band members Optamus, Dazastah, Cheeky and Armee. All tracks were recorded and mixed at various members' homes except for flutes on "Bring It All Black" and "Arabian Knights", which were recorded at Studio Couch in Fremantle, Western Australia.

At the J Award of 2005, the album was nominated for Australian Album of the Year.

Several tracks from the album received airplay from radio stations around Australia, including 4ZZZ (Brisbane), FBi (Sydney), 3RRR (Melbourne) and RTRFM (Perth).

== Background ==
Downsyde was formed in Perth, Western Australia when MC Optamus (Scott Griffiths) and MC Dyna-mikes (Shahbaz Rind) were in Year 11 at Craigie Senior High School in 1996. The duo released a tape demo called Behind the Bucket, selling copies at two local shops. The group added a third MC, Dazastah (D. Reutens), whom they met at Leederville TAFE, and DJ Armee (Damien Allia) on turntables, met at the Hyde Park Hotel where he would DJ on Monday nights. Later, the group expanded to include percussionist Salvatore (Salvatore Pizzata) (ex-Beaverloop) and Cheeky (Mat Cheetham) (ex-Circus Murders) on keyboards, loops & samples joining the group.

In September 2000 Downsyde released their debut album, Epinonimous—recordings made during 1996–2000. Their first single, "Gifted Life", was released two years later, and was nominated as 'Best Single' at the 2003 Australian Dance Music Awards. Their second album, Land of the Giants, was released in 2003 on the Hydrofunk label. It won 'Most Popular Local Original Album' at the 2003 Western Australian Music Industry Awards.

Downsyde signed with Obese Records and in 2004 released a single, "Lesfortunate", which they followed up with their third album, When the Dust Settles, in December. The album was nominated for the 2005 J Award.

In 2007 the band signed with Illusive Records and commenced recording their next album, once the final tracks were down on tape they then headed off to India to play a couple of shows for the Mumbai Festival.

We've changed labels every album. We did Epinonimous independently, Land of the Giants on EMI/Hydrofunk and When the Dust Settles on Obese. After When the Dust Settles was released, we need to take time away from touring and a whole lotta other stuff to do with the industry; we felt there was a whole lotta pressure for us to release another album a year and a half later and to do all of this stuff mechanically, which creatively didn't feel right. We specifically sign one album deals, whereas a lotta artists get bullied into three album deals and get shockingly ripped off, spat out and are not a musician two years later.

— Optamus

The group's fourth album, All City was released on 4 October 2008, it features collaborations with Howling John Stone and Guru.

== Track listing ==
All songs written by Shahbaz Rind (Dyna Mikes), D. Reutens (Dazastah), Scott Griffiths (Optamus), Mat Cheetham (Cheeky) and Damien Allia (Armee), unless otherwise noted.

1. "When the Dust Settles" – 1:23
2. "Lesfortunate" – 4:09
3. "Anyone Can Do It" – 3:37
4. "Bring It All Back" – 3:27
5. "To tha Stumps" (D. Reutens, Scott Griffiths, Shahbaz Rind, Damien Allia) – 4:15
6. "Raggadope" – 4:14
7. "I Love It!" (Scott Griffiths, D. Reutens) – 0:56
8. "Take It Off" (Mathew Cheetham) – 3:18
9. "The Sooner the Better" – 3:41
10. "Oh' Armee" (Damien Allia) – 0:13
11. "Coming Back for More" – 5:38
12. "Best Kept Secret" (Millis, Scott Griffiths, D. Reutens, Shahbaz Rind, Damien Allia) – 3:39
13. "Adventures in Sampling" (Scott Griffiths) – 0:45
14. "I'm All I Can Be" (D. Reutens, Scott Griffiths, Damien Allia) – 4:20
15. "Around the Way" – 3:40
16. "I'm Funny" – 0:09
17. "Don't Cha Know" – 3:44
18. "Verbal Diarrhoea" (D. Reutens, Damien Allia, Shahbaz Rind, Scott Griffiths, Layla Hanbury) – 4:25
19. "What's Your J.O.B." (Damien Allia) – 0:16
20. "Lies of Honesty" (Mathew Cheetham) – 4:44
21. "Arabian Knights" – 3:42
22. "First Love" (D. Reutens, Damien Allia, Shahbaz Rind, Scott Griffiths) – 3:49
23. "Outro" (Damien Allia) – 1:12

== Personnel ==
Downsyde members

- Optamus (Scott Griffiths)
- Dazastah (D. Reutens)
- Cheeky (Mathew Cheetham)
- Armee (Damien Allia)
- Dyna Mikes aka Shahbaz (Shahbaz Rind)

Additional musicians/performers

- Drapht (Paul Ridge)- "To tha Stumps"
- Porsah Laine – "Raggadope" & "First Love"
- Kell – "Take It Off"
- Hunter – "Comin Back for More"
- MJ Funkola – "Comin Back for More"
- Koolism (Langomi-e-Hau Latukefu) – "Don't Cha Know?"
- Layla (Layla Handbury) – "Verbal Diarrhoea"
- Louis Slipperz – "Lies of Honesty"

Production details

- Producer – Optamus (Scott Griffiths), Dazastah (D. Reutens), Cheeky (Mathew Cheetham), Armee (Damien Allia)
