= Root Supposed He Was Out of the Question... =

Studio album by Root!
- Released: 7 December 2007
- Recorded: July 2005 – July 2007
- Studio: Meek Joe Studios
- Genre: Country, spoken word, comedy
- Length: 43:41
- Label: Meek Joe Records
- Producer: Meek Joe

Root! chronology
Root Supposed He Was Out of the Question... (2007)	Get Up Yourself (2008)

Professional ratings
Review scores
Source	Rating
Time Out Sydney	3/6 stars

Root Supposed He Was Out of the Question... is the debut album by Australian rock band Root!, released on 7 December 2007. The album is a mixture of country, rock and comedy lyrics, as well as sections of spoken word.

Although the album was initially planned to be released in August 2007, the band was unhappy with the mix and decided that a full remixing was necessary before the album was released.

== Track listing ==
1. "I Wish I Was Tex Perkins" – 4:10
2. "Spring Me Out of Caroline Springs, Caroline" – 3:47
3. "Shazza and Michelle" – 4:38
4. "Young Man's Blues Blues" – 3:27
5. "I Still Call Australia 'HO'" – 3:04
6. "My Cowboy Hat Is Bigger Than Texas" – 3:28
7. "The Ballad of the Poowong Magpies" – 2:44
8. "School Mum" – 3:40
9. "Pauline Hanson Says There's Christian Muslims Too" – 4:26
10. "Back to Mine" – 6:48
11. "Root 66" [unlisted] – 3:37
