= The DC3 =

Australian rock band

- Origin: Melbourne, Victoria, Australia
- Genres: Alternative rock
- Years active: 2010–2013
- Label: Meek Joe Records
- Members: Damian Cowell; Henri Grawe; Douglas Lee Robertson

The DC3 were an Australian rock band who were composed of three members of Root!. They were known for lead singer Damian Cowell being a member of TISM. They released their first single, "I Was the Guy in TISM" in 2010. A remixed and extended version appears on their debut album The Future Sound of Nostalgia, released in 2011.

== History ==
In 2010, Damian Cowell was contracted to write an album for the Museum of Old and New Art. The album, titled Vs Art, was composed of new songs about the artwork at MONA. Cowell split his alt-country band Root! up soon after but reformed it with fewer members under the name the DC3. The DC3 gained a following among former TISM and Root! fans after the band's first single "I was the guy in TISM" was released in November 2010.

The DC3's first show was at the opening of MONA in Hobart. In December 2010, Vs Art was released. The band began to play live in Melbourne and around Australia.

Cowell originally intended to call the band "The Future Sound of Nostalgia"", but he thought it was too long. This is instead the name of the band's official debut album which was released on 1 September 2011.

The DC3's second and final album, May Contain Traces of Nut, was released on 7 February 2013. It was funded by a Pozible project which raised $12,590. In April 2013, The DC3 performed an hour-long show The Ringtone Cycle at the Melbourne International Comedy Festival.

At the end of 2013, the DC3 broke up so Cowell could concentrate on his solo project Damian Cowell's Disco Machine. Their final two songs, "Bryan Miller" and "Martin Wagner" (outtakes from the May Contain Traces of Nut sessions), were released on SoundCloud in early 2014. In an interview in 2015, Cowell stated that the breakup was in part due to Robertson's and Grawe's desires to live normal lives.

== Style ==
The DC3 mainly played standard alternative rock with social commentary as the lyrics, as heard in songs like "I Was the Guy in TISM" and "Henry Fucking Wagons". The sound is reminiscent of White Albun-era TISM. The band itself described its style as "motorik punk rock Eurodisco".

Some DC3 songs (e.g. "Girls, Girls, Girls", "Shut the Fuck Up", "Henry Fucking Wagons") were performed as Root! songs as early as 2008 before the name-change to the DC3.

"I Was the Guy in TISM"
Sample of the single version of "I Was the Guy in TISM"

"Henry Fucking Wagons"
Sample of "Henry Fucking Wagons" (live at the Northcote Social Club)

== Discography ==
=== Albums ===
Title	Details
The Future Sound of Nostalgia	Released: 2011; Label: Meek Joe Records (DC3#1)
May Contain Traces of Nut	Released: 2013; Label: Meek Joe Records (DC3#2)
