= Surface Paradise =

2009 studio album by Root!

Studio album by Root!
- Released: 24 July 2009
- Recorded: 2008–2009
- Genre: Country, spoken word, rock, comedy
- Length: 60:50
- Label: Shock, Meek Joe
- Producer: Meek Joe

Root! chronology
Get Up Yourself (2008)	Surface Paradise (2009)

Professional ratings
Review scores
Source	Rating
The Dwarf	positive

First Root

Demo album by Root!
- Released: 24 July 2009
- Recorded: 2005–2006
- Genre: Country, spoken word, rock, comedy
- Length: 35:32
- Label: Shock, Meek Joe
- Producer: Meek Joe

Root! chronology
Get Up Yourself (2008)	First Root (2009)

Surface Paradise is the second full-length album by Australian rock band Root!, released on 24 July 2009. The album follows the previous year's EP release Get Up Yourself, of which several references are made to. Continuing the band's more rock-oriented explorations since their debut, the album features several recurring motifs, both musical and lyrical and can be considered a loose concept album. The album's concept is that of the fictional, and perhaps metaphorical, 'Surface Paradise', which is most specifically referred to in the album's title tracks. The paradise itself is directly mentioned as a being like a supermarket, yet it is likely to be a non-physical place, where the world's trendy and elite are seen to reside.

The album features extensive liner notes, tying into the album's conceptual themes. Rather than featuring any traditional descriptions of the songs, the notes are exhibited as several pages taken from a book. The book appears to deal with the band's self-titled 'Root' character, as well as the characters 'The Unit' and 'Tyfani'. In addition to the full-length album, early runs of the CD are accompanied by a bonus disc of early Root! demos. This disc, titled First Root!, is accompanied by its own set of liner notes which detail the band's formation and early years.

== Track listing ==
=== Surface Paradise ===
No.	Title	Written by	Length
1.	"Surface Paradise Parts 5, 18, 35, 36, 47 & 92"	Root/Root/Root	2:41
2.	"Surface Paradise Part 13"	Root/Root	4:04
3.	"My Other Bumper Sticker Is Intelligent"	Root/Root	3:23
4.	"(Sort of) Emo"	Root/Root/Root	3:10
5.	"Thank God You're Here"	Root/Root/Root	4:58
6.	"Famous for Being Famous for Being Famous"	Root/Root	3:16
7.	"Orange People"	Root/Root	5:18
8.	"Joe Blogs"	Root/Root/Root	2:24
9.	"Everybody Loves You (Longtime)"	Root/Root/Root	5:53
10.	"Uncle Vom Vom"	Root/Root	3:25
11.	"Crown Tower Blues"	Root/Root	2:41
12.	"I Hang Out with the Guys In Jet('s Uncle)"	Root/Root	3:33
13.	"Home?"	Root/Root/Root	3:35
14.	"I Fought the Groove Police"	Root/Root	4:15
15.	"Surface Paradise Parts 25–31"	Root/Root	8:20
Total length:			60:50

=== First Root! ===
All tracks are written by Root/Root

No.	Title	Length
1.	"School Mum"	4:21
2.	"Johnny in the Wilderness"	2:56
3.	"Rooted"	3:52
4.	"I Met Ray Davies"	3:16
5.	"I'm a Country Member"	4:29
6.	"I Still Call Australia 'HO'"	2:48
7.	"The Rites of Springy"	4:34
8.	"Bejesus"	3:43
9.	"Three Cheers for the Boost Juice Lady"	2:51
10.	"Henri Lee"	2:50
Total length:		35:32
