= Root! =

Australian rock band

- Origin: Melbourne, Victoria, Australia
- Genre: Alternative rock
- Years active: 2005–2010, 2012
- Labels: Meek Joe, Shock
- Past members: DC Root; Henri Root; Doug Lee Root; Steve Root; Owen Root; Barnaby Root; Smiley Root; Joe Root (infrequent live member)

Root! were an Australian rock band from Melbourne formed in 2005. Their music combines alt-country, blues and indie rock with elements of spoken word, satire, social commentary and post-modernism. They have gained attention through a band member being a former member of Melbourne band TISM.

== History ==
In early 2005, Root! began as a series of demos written solely by lead singer Damian Cowell ("DC Root"). In late 2006, guitarist Henri Grawe ("Henri Root") was hired as a tradesperson to build a set of shelves for DC. "Henri came 'round to my house to build me some shelves and I discovered that he was a jazz trained musician". During 2006, the group was fleshed out with Steve Root on keyboards and Barnaby Root on drums. Cowell and Grawe knew each other as far back as 2000 – Grawe had worked with Cowell's former band TISM on their 2001 album De Rigueurmortis.

Their first concert as a group was made at the closing party of Melbourne's Spanish Club on 17 June 2007. Although barely announced, word that an alleged member of TISM was unveiling a new project led to a large, expectant crowd assembling. From there, word of mouth spread, leading to heavy traffic on the band's nascent MySpace page, the creation of a fan website entitled The Root! Compendium, and growing demand for an album.

Root! appeared at a handful of other performances over the next few months, whilst re-recording tracks for their debut album, Root Supposed He Was Out Of The Question. In 2008, the band played live with additional musicians Joe Talia (a.k.a. Joe Root, pedal steel and banjo) and Douglas Lee Robertson (a.k.a. Doug Lee Root, bass).

Root Supposed He Was Out Of The Question was released in December 2007 and featured no singles. During 2008 tours, new material was played including "Get Up Yourself" which became the title track of the four-track EP Get Up Yourself.

In 2009, drummer Barnaby Root left the band and was replaced with Smiley Root. After playing several gigs and appearing in the video for "My Other Bumper Sticker is Intelligent", he left the band to be replaced by Owen Root. Around this time, the second album Surface Paradise was released.

After a handful of gigs in mid-2010, Root! announced they would be playing their "Last Ever Show" on 20 August 2010. Although the press release concluded with "... is there a new project on the way? All will be revealed soon. Stay tuned."

For the next three years, Cowell, Robinson and Grawe performed as a trio under the name The DC3. For their one-year anniversary, Root! reformed to open for The DC3 at the Regal Ballroom, 3 February 2012.

== Musical style and influences ==
DC Root and Henri Root claim that their initial common musical ground was the Flying Burrito Brothers and Mark E. Smith. DC describes Root! as made up of all the things he loves about country that has been mixed with other genres. It is the "long-winded musical excursion" with "a little wit as well" inherent in country music that allows DC Root to employ poetic, literary imagery and then undercuts it with self-effacing references.

== Members ==
- DC Root (a.k.a. Damian Cowell) – vocals, samples
- Henri Root (a.k.a. Henri Grawe) – guitar, vocals
- Doug Lee Root (a.k.a. Douglas Lee Robertson) – Bass, vocals
- Steve Root (a.k.a. Steve Paix) – keyboards, vocals
- Owen Root (a.k.a. Owen Smythe) – drums – Former drummer for Grin Dogs and Splurge.
- Barnaby Root (a.k.a. Barnaby Gold) – drums, vocals
- Joe Root (a.k.a. Joe Talia, played live only) – slide guitar, banjo
- Smiley Root (a.k.a. Derek Smiley, former drummer for Ice Cream Hands)

== Discography ==
=== Albums ===
Title	Details
Root Supposed He Was Out of the Question...	Released: December 2007; Label: Meek Joe Records (MEEKJOE1)
Surface Paradise	Released: July 2009; Label: Meek Joe Records (MEEKJOE3/MEEKJOE4)

=== Extended plays ===
Title	Details
Get Up Yourself	Released: August 2008; Label: Meek Joe Records (MEEKJOE2)
