= All City (Downsyde album) =

Studio album by Downsyde
- Released: October 2008
- Recorded: 2008
- Genre: Hip-hop
- Label: Illusive Sounds
- Producer: Optamus, Dazastah, Cheeky, Armee

Downsyde chronology
When the Dust Settles (2004)	All City (2008)	ClassicILL (2017)

Singles from All City
- 1. "Fortune & Fame" Released: September 2008

All City is the fourth official studio album from Western Australian hip-hop group, Downsyde. It was released in October 2008 through their new label, Illusive Sounds.

This album differs from the group's previous efforts in that it doesn't focus on Australian guest MCs, other than the appearance of Porsah Laine.

"With this album we wanted to feature vocalists of a different sort, and we felt that with certain tracks we wanted a chorus or a hook that could mould quite easily into our vocals. We didn't want obvious choices, we wanted vocalists that engage you straight away. We wanted things to smack the listener in the head, like being hit by a baseball bat." - Optamus

"I said in passing to Armee, 'Dude let's try to get him (Guru) on a track.' So I said 'Let's just get in contact with his tour manager and send him When the Dust Settles and see what he has to say.' I though that there was no harm in trying. Sure enough, the tour manager contacted us, and Daz ran off something like 30 beats onto a CD and we express posted it over to him as soon as we could. There was one beat on there that he was really feeling (which eventually transformed into "Watucamehere 4") and before going back to the States he had one layover day. The heavens opened up and on that Sunday we went 'bang let's book a studio and knock it out.' On that Sunday I was hungover, but there - we were in the studio with Mr. Guru, slash Jazzmatazz, himself." - Optamus

On 17 November 2008 Triple J announced that All City was their feature album for that week.

== Track listing ==
All songs written by Shahbaz Rind, D. Reutens, Scott Griffiths, Mat Cheetham and Damien Allia, unless otherwise noted.

1. "All City"
2. "Fortune & Fame" (featuring Howling John Stone)
3. "Watucamehere 4" (featuring Guru)
4. "Every City"
5. "Master MC"
6. "Hot Town"
7. "Life Speed" (featuring Stamina MC)
8. "Calm Before The Storm"
9. "Takin' It Over"
10. "Some How"
11. "Super Heroes"
12. "Soulfiend"(featuring Howling John Stone)
13. "Unstoppable"

== Personnel ==
=== Downsyde ===
- Optamus (Scott Griffiths)
- Dazastah (D. Reutens)
- Cheeky (Mathew Cheetham)
- Armee (Damien Allia)
- Dyna Mikes aka Shahbaz (Shahbaz Rind)

== Charts ==
Chart (2007)	Peak position
Australia (ARIA Charts)	76
Australia Urban Albums charts (ARIA)	26
