= Brad Strut =

- Born: Yarrawonga, Victoria, Australia
- Genre: Hip hop
- Occupation: Emcee
- Years active: 1991–present
- Labels: Obese, Unkut, Peruvian Gemz
- Member of: Lyrical Commission

Brad Strut is an Australian hip hop emcee and singer based in Melbourne. Strut has performed and released material as a solo artist, and is also a member of hip hop group Lyrical Commission.

== Biography ==
Brad Strut was born in Yarrawonga in the Victorian countryside, and moved to Melbourne when he was nine years old. He grew up in the Western suburbs and later in the inner Eastern suburbs of Melbourne. Strut became involved in hip hop initially with break dancing and graffiti, and then onto hip hop music. Strut released his first demo, Rock On in 1993. In 1999, he joined up with fellow hip hop emcee, Trem One, to record "Basic Fundamentals", which was released on Trem's second 12", Amateurs, by Unkut Recordings. Also that year, Strut and Trem formed the hip hop band Lyrical Commission with Bob Balans and DJ J-Red. The group appeared on Culture of Kings Volume 1 (2000) with their track "Lyrical Mongrels".

Strut's debut solo album, The Authentic LP, was released in 2001 on the Obese Records label. Mark Hebblewhite from Stealth Magazine described it:

"Brad Strut is a self-proclaimed ordinary Aussie bloke, a tag he stays true to with his debut release. Boasting an instantly recognisable flow, upbeat and strong with a distinct Aussie drawl, Strut hits up the listener with brutally honest rhymes covering topics as diverse as everyday life in Melbourne and a personal undisguised frustration with certain aspects of the Australian hip hop scene".

The Authentic LP achieved sales of 8000+ units with no industry hype in a time of minimal support for credible Australian hip hop. The album was heralded as ground-breaking, receiving acclaim from international hip hop fans. The track, "A Good Thing" appeared on Jurassic 5 DJ Nu-Mark's 2004 album, Hand's On, released by Sequence Records. The Authentic LP featured Lazy Grey, Sean B and Lyrical Commission.

In 2002, Strut, in collaboration with Chopper Read, Bias B and Bob Balans, released a song called "Machete" on the Obesecity compilation album by various Australian hip hop artists. In the same year, Strut worked with Read on the song "Chop Chop".

In 2006 Strut released Legendary: The Official Mixtape on his newly formed Peruvian Gemz imprint, a subsidiary of Unkut Recordings. Legendary featured guest appearances by Perth’s Clandestien, Rhys of Hospice Crew and Billy Bunks. Later that year, Strut represented Australia at Hip Hop Kemp in the Czech Republic, a massive three-day hip hop festival, which showcased Non Phixion, RA The Rugged Man, Planet Asia and Klashnekoff.

2007 saw the release of Strut's second studio album, Legend: Official. The album was produced by Trem and features Lyrical Commission, Sean Price, Outerspace, Daniel Merriweather and Lee Sissing. Strut's portrait by Melbourne artist, Therese Derrick, from her Men We Love collection, was displayed in the Campbell Arcade off Flinders Street, from late May to mid-June. Derrick explored the concept of notability "when it comes to one of the guys not so much in the public eye – such as rapper Brad Strut – people might just assume that because he's on display alongside Dave Hughes that he automatically becomes a celebrity as well."

Strut has performed at Livid Festival and Big Day Out, and has toured nationally. He played in Europe including Austria, Edinburgh Festival (2007) and Hip Hop Kemp (2006, 2008) in Czech Republic.

In 2009, Strut released a package set including Fallout Shelter EP and the Rejuvination LP whilst living in North London, UK. The beats were provided by UK producer Beat Butcha, who had also worked with UK hip hop artists Braintax and Jehst. Strut had met Butcha through Disorda/Suspect Packages, and they both attended a Ghostface concert. The Rejuvination LP contained reworked songs from Strut's catalogue remixed by Australian and UK hip hop artists such as Butcha, Jehst, M-Phazes, Ciecmate, Mortar, and Dazastah.

== Discography ==
- The Authentic LP – Obese (OBR-010) (2001)
- Legendary: The Official Mixtape – Peruvian Gemz/Unkut (16 March 2006)
- Legend: Official – Peruvian Gemz/Unkut (UR 401-CD) (4 June 2007)
- Fallout Shelter – Peruvian Gemz/Unkut (29 June 2009)
- Rejuvination – Peruvian Gemz/Unkut (2009)
