= Epinonimous =

Studio album by Downsyde
- Released: September 2000
- Recorded: 1996–2000
- Genre: Australian hip-hop
- Length: 44:04
- Label: Syllaboliks Records
- Producer: Downsyde

Downsyde chronology
Epinonimous (2000)	Land of the Giants (2003)

Epinonimous is the debut album released by the Australian Hip Hop group Downsyde. Although Downsyde are now quite well known throughout Australia, this album is hard to get hold of. It was released in September 2000.

== Track listing ==
All songs written by Damien Allia, Shahbaz Rind, D. Reutens and Scott Griffiths.

1. "Intro" - 1:21
2. "Reap What We Sow" - 4:52
3. "Subconscious Cyclones" - 4:02
4. "Raiders Of The Lost Art" - 4:49
5. "Something Natural" - 4:43
6. "Matty B's Insight" - 0:56
7. "Y2K - You're All Too Cautious" - 3:51
8. "Who's Ya Server" - 3:47
9. "Battle Me" - 3:52
10. "Ya So Fake" - 8:52
11. "Microphone Masters" - 3:14
