= Downsyde =

Australian hip-hop band

- Origin: Perth, Western Australia
- Genres: Australian hip-hop
- Years active: 1996–present
- Labels: Hydrofunk Records; Obese Records; Illusive Sounds
- Members: Optamus (Scott Griffiths) (MC/Production); Dazastah (Darren Reutens) (MC/Production); Dyna-Mikes (Shahbaz Rind) (MC)
- Past members: DJ Armee (Damien Allia) (turntables); Cheeky (Mathew Cheetham) (bass guitar, keyboards); Hi-Hat (Steve Curyer) (drums, percussion); Salvatore (Salvatore Pizzata) (drums, percussion); Catastrophe (R. Reutens) (drums, percussion)
- Website: http://www.downsyde.com.au/

Downsyde is an Australian hip-hop group from Perth, Western Australia. The group is composed of three members, Optamus, Dazastah and Dyna-Mikes.

The group has performed alongside groups including Jurassic 5, Cypress Hill, Grandmaster Flash, The Black Eyed Peas, and The Roots. They also performed with Australian acts like Hilltop Hoods, Resin Dogs, and Koolism. The band has also performed at a number of festivals, including Big Day Out, Splendour in the Grass, Rock-It, Falls Festival, Homebake, Good Vibrations and the Southbound Festival.

== History ==
=== 1996–2001: Epinonimous ===
Downsyde's origin occurred when MCs Optamus (Scott Griffiths) and Dyna-mikes (Shahbaz Rind) were in Year 11 at Craigie Senior High School, where they took part in a school talent quest in 1996. The group said; "We sort of figured out ourselves at 16 the best way for us to identify with Australia and to write topical music about Australia was for us to use our own voices rather than adopting a New York accent." – Optamus

The duo released a tape demo called Behind the Bucket, selling copies at two local shops, managing to sell all of the 200 copies they made within weeks.

The band said "We suddenly got asked to play gigs with Eskimo Joe and Beaverloop at the Grosvenor and actually gig as a band. At that point we used to play the gig with our beats recorded on a walkman that we'd plug through the PA." – Optamus

The group added a third MC, Dazastah (Darren Reutens), whom they met at Leederville TAFE, and DJ Armee (Damien Allia) on turntables, meeting him at the Hyde Park Hotel where he would DJ on Monday nights. Later, the group expanded to the current line-up with percussionist Salvatore (Salvatore Pizzata) (ex-Beaverloop) and Cheeky (Mat Cheetham) (ex-Circus Murders) on keyboards, loops & samples joining the group. Cheetham recalls "I was in Tokyo hanging out and got a call from my mate Sal, he's playing drums with these guys Downsyde and he said 'when you come back you should have a crack at sampling stuff for them.' So I came back, met the guys and the next thing I know I was in the band. My first show was at the Big Day Out." – Cheeky

For four years Downsyde produced beats and rhymes and played at hundreds of gigs, parties, and MC battles culminating in the September 2000 release of their debut album, Epinonimous – recordings made by the band from 1996 to 2000.

=== 2002–2006: Land of the Giants & When the Dust Settles ===
Their first single, "Gifted Life", was released in 2002 and was nominated as 'Best Single' at the 2003 Australian Dance Music Awards. In the same year, Downsyde won the Best Debut Artist at the Dance Music Awards.

Their second album, Land of the Giants, was released in 2003 on the Hydrofunk label. The album won 'Most Popular Local Original Album' at the 2003 Western Australian Music Industry Awards.

Downsyde signed with Obese Records and in 2004 released a single, "Lesfortunate", which they followed up with a third album, When the Dust Settles, in December 2004. The album was nominated for the J Award of 2005.

Pizzata was replaced by Catastrophe, Dazastah's brother on drums between 2005 and 2006. Catastrophe was a short-term member and filled in to do the late 2005 "When The Dust Settles" Australian Tour and performances up to mid 2006. Steve Curyer (aka Hi-Hat), Downsyde's current drummer, joined in early 2007.

Downsyde was one of the Australian hip-hop artists featured in the documentary Words from the City, which aired on ABC Television in late 2007.

Dazastah (Reutens) is a prominent local record producer. Optamus (Griffiths) runs his own label, Opt Shop Records. Armee (Allia) has toured with Fdel and DJ'd at many prominent clubs in Asia. Cheeky (Cheetham) is a member of dub group the Sunshine Brothers and has a solo project 'Rooster Police'.

=== 2007–2009: All City ===
In 2007 the band signed with Illusive Records and commenced recording their next album, once the final tracks were down on tape they then headed off to India to play a couple of shows for the Mumbai Festival. The band said "We've changed labels every album. We did Epinonimous independently, Land of the Giants on EMI/Hydrofunk, and When the Dust Settles on Obese. After When the Dust Settles was released, we needed to take time away from touring and a whole lotta other stuff to do with the industry; we felt there was a whole lotta pressure for us to release another album a year and a half later and to do all of this stuff mechanically, which creatively didn't feel right. We specifically sign one album deals, whereas a lotta artists get bullied into three album deals and get shockingly ripped off, spat out, and are not a musician two years later. We sent 'this' album out to countless labels and we got back countless deals back. It just happened that Illusive came back with a very interesting way of marketing Downsyde, plus we have the common goal of elevating us as a band and not Australian hip-hop per se." – Optamus

The group's fourth album, All City was released on 4 October 2008, and features collaborations with Howling John Stone and Guru. The album became their first album to enter the ARIA top 100, peaking at number 76.

The first single from the album "Fortune and Fame" was released on 1 September, together with the accompanying video produced by West Australian production company The Penguin Empire has received significant airplay.

In October 2008 to promote the release of the new album, Downsyde embarked on its first national tour since 2005. Of the tour, the band said "We're pumped man – it has been a long time since we did a string of dates around the country, and it's good fun." - Optamus

=== 2010–2015: hiatus ===
Optamus released his debut solo album Forever & a Day in June 2010, with keyboardist Chris 'Imposter' Foster and multi-instrumentalist Moondog. Dazastah is embarking on a talent project called "Natural Dazastahs" in which he will be uploading beats online for the public to rhyme over, with the best entries being compiled for release. Although members are working on these various solo projects the group is still working on a fifth album.

As Downsyde, we've got about eight or nine tracks in demo form for the new album, which we're hoping to finish – at least written-wise – by the end of the year.

— Scott Griffiths (Optamus)

=== 2015–present: reformation and Classic ILL ===
Downsyde has been on a five-year hiatus. however in 2015, they have been recording their sixth studio album, Classic ILL. The first single, "Only Got Now" from the album was released in September 2017. The music video to the single was directed by Aaron McCann.

== Discography ==
=== Albums ===
Title	Details	Peak chart positions
Title	Details	AUS
Behind the Bucket	Released: 1997; Label: Da Da records; Format: Cassette limited to 200 copies	-
Epinonimous	Released: September 2000; Label: Syllaboliks; Format: CD, digital download	-
Land of the Giants	Released: 2002; Label: Hydrofunk Records (HF 26); Format: CD, LP, digital download	-
When the Dust Settles	Released: December 2004; Label: Obese Records (OBR026); Format: CD, 2xLP, digital download	-
All City	Released: October 2008; Label: Illusive Sounds (ILL014CD); Format: CD, digital download	76
ClassicILL	Released: September 2017; Label: Shake Down Records (SDR0010); Format: CD, LP, digital download, streaming	-
Stereotypez	Released: October 2024; Label: Optshop; Format: CD, LP, digital download, streaming	-

=== Singles ===
Title	Year	Album
"Gifted Life"	2002	Land of the Giants
"El Questro"	2003	Land of the Giants
"Clap Your Hands"	2003	
"Lesfortunate"	2004	Land of the Giants
"Fortune and Fame"	2008	All City
"Life Speed"	2008	All City
"Only Got Now" (featuring Porsah Laine)	2016	ClassicILL
"Richman"	2017	ClassicILL
"Back in the Game" (featuring Sam Nafie)	2017	ClassicILL
"Memory" (featuring Jsquared & Moondog)	2018	
"Odds" (featuring Sam Nafie)	2019	
"Call" (featuring James Abberley)	2021	

== Awards and nominations ==
=== Australian Dance Music Awards ===
Downsyde won one award from five nominations in 2003.

Year	Nominee / work	Award	Result
2003	Downsyde	Best Hip-Hop Act	Nominated
2003	Downsyde	Best Australian Hip-Hop Act	Nominated
2003	Downsyde	Best Debut Artist	Won
2003	Land of the Giants	Best Album	Nominated
2003	"Gifted Life"	Best Single	Nominated

=== J Award ===
The J Awards is an annual series of Australian music awards that were established by the Australian Broadcasting Corporation's youth-focused radio station Triple J. They commenced in 2005.

Year	Nominee / work	Award	Result
2005	When the Dust Settles	Australian Album of the Year	Nominated

=== West Australian Music Industry Awards ===
The Western Australian Music Industry Awards (commonly known as WAMis) are annual awards presented to the local contemporary music industry, put on by the Western Australian Music Industry Association Inc (WAM). Downsyde won 10 awards.

Year	Nominee / work	Award	Result (wins only)
2001	Downsyde	Most Popular Original Electronic Act	Won
2003	Downsyde	Most Popular Local Original Urban Music Act	Won
2003	Land of the Giants	Most Popular Local Original Local Album	Won
2003	"El Questro"	Most Popular Local Original Music Video	Won
2005	Downsyde	Best Live Electronic Act	Won
2005	Downsyde	Best Urban Music Act	Won
2006	Downsyde	Best Urban Music Act	Won
2007	Downsyde	Best Urban Music / Hip Hop Act	Won
2008	Downsyde	Best Urban Music / Hip Hop Act	Won
2009	"Fortune and Fame" by Downsyde	Most Popular Music Video	Won
