= List of Australian hip-hop musicians =

The following is a list of notable Australian hip hop artists:

== 0-9 ==
- 1200 Techniques
- 360

== A ==
- A.B. Original
- A.Girl
- Allday
- A-Love
- Andrez Bergen
- Astronomy Class

== B ==
- Baker Boy
- Bangs
- Bang Chan (Stray Kids)
- Barkaa
- Benjamin Speed
- Bias B
- Big Dave
- Birdz
- Blades
- Bliss n Eso
- Brad Strut
- Brethren
- Briggs
- Brothablack
- Brothers Stoney
- Butterfingers

== C ==
- Carmouflage Rose
- Chance Waters
- Chillinit
- Citizen Kay
- Combat Wombat
- Cristian Alexanda
- Curse ov Dialect

== D ==
- Dazastah
- Def Wish Cast
- Diafrix
- Dialectrix
- DJ Bonez
- DJ Damage
- Downsyde
- Drapht

== E ==
- Elf Tranzporter
- Elsy Wameyo
- Esoterik

== F ==
- Felix (rapper)
- Figgkidd
- Fluent Form
- Foreign Heights
- Funkoars

== G ==
- Giulietta
- Grey Ghost
- Gully Platoon

== H ==
- Hau Latukefu
- Hermitude
- Hilltop Hoods
- Hunter
- Huskii
- Hyjak N Torcha
- Horrorshow

== I ==
- Iggy Azalea
- Illy
- Illzilla
- Israel Cruz
- Ivan Ooze

== J ==
- Jackson Jackson
- JK-47
- Joelistics
- Justice & Kaos
- J-Wess

== K ==
- Katalyst
- Kat McSnatch
- Kenny Sabir
- Kerser
- Koolism
- Kwame

== L ==
- L-FRESH the Lion
- The Last Kinection
- Lez Beckett
- Little G
- Local Knowledge
- Lithe

== M ==
- Macromantics
- Manu Crooks
- Matty B
- Maya Jupiter
- MC Layla
- MC Opi
- MC Trey
- Metabass'n'Breath
- Mighty Big Crime
- Milwaukee Banks
- Mind over Matter
- Mista Savona
- Miracle
- Mnemonic Ascent
- Morganics
- M-Phazes
- Muph & Plutonic
- Munkimuk

== N ==
- Native Ryme Syndicate
- N'fa

== O ==
- Omar Musa
- Onefour

== P ==
- Paul Nakad
- Pegz
- Pez
- Phinesse
- Phrase
- Purified

== Q ==
- Quro

== R ==
- Radical Son
- Raspberry Cordial
- Resin Dogs
- Ryland Rose

== S ==
- Snob Scrilla
- Sound Unlimited
- Space Invadas
- Spit Syndicate
- Stik n Move
- Street Warriors
- Suffa

== T ==
- Tasman Keith
- Thundamentals
- Tkay Maidza
- The Bumblebeez
- The Kid Laroi
- The Tongue
- The Herd
- The Wilcannia Mob
- The Meeting Tree
- Trials
- True Live
- Tuka
- TZU

== U ==
- Urthboy

== V ==
- Vents

== W ==
- Wombat

== Y ==
- Yung Warriors

== Z ==
- Ziggy Ramo

== See also ==
- Australian hip hop
- Music of Australia
