= DJ Bonez =

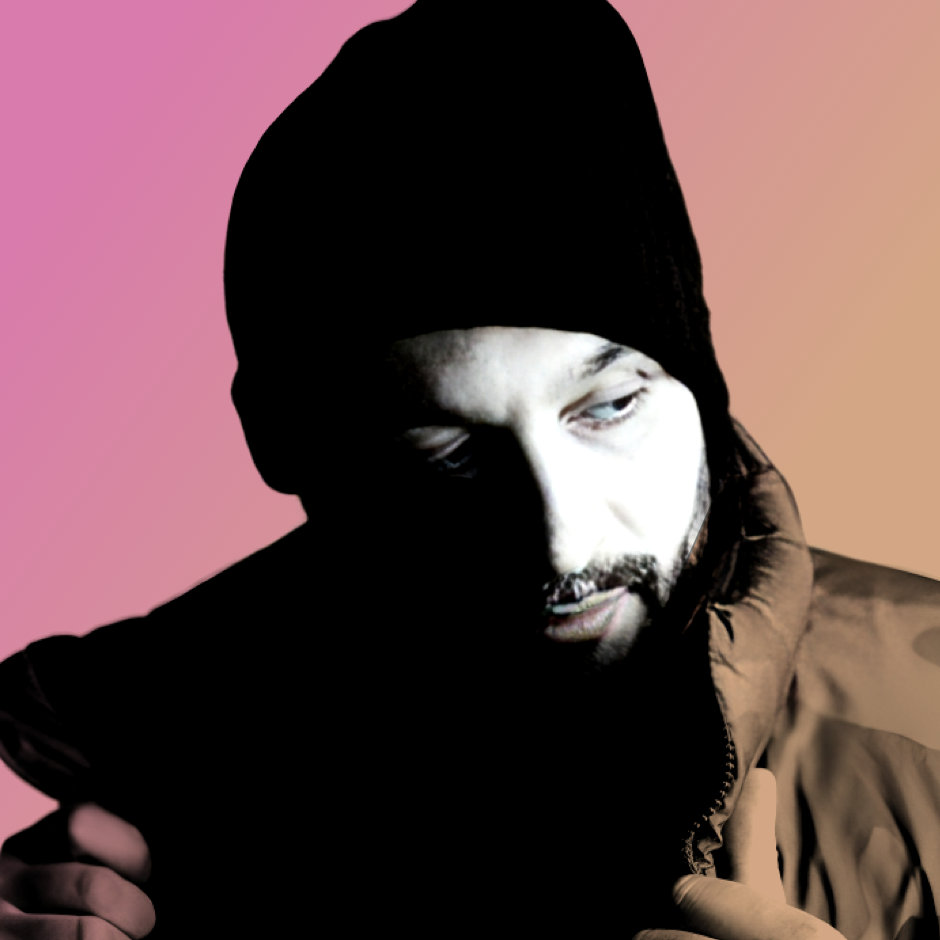

Background information
- Origin: Sydney, Australia
- Genres: Australian hip hop
- Labels: Statik Recordings, Obese Records, Shogun, Dlyte (current), Independent
- Website: djbonez.bandcamp.com

George Kordas, better known by the stage name DJ Bonez, is an Australian hip hop DJ and producer from Sydney, widely recognised as one of Australia’s top hip hop DJs and producers. Known for his turntablism, break-beat production, and scratch records, DJ Bonez has been described as being at "the forefront of Australian DJing culture as a performer and also catering to DJs worldwide with break beats and scratch records".

== Career ==
Bonez began creating four-track mix tapes and CDs for the underground hip hop scene in the early 90's while at high school. By the age of 17, he had expanded his skills and started performing as a club and scratch DJ in venues across Australia.

In 1995, Bonez moved into production. Having honed his skills as a DJ, he performed turntable trick routines and began producing battle records; early releases appeared on Statik Recordings. By 1997, Bonez had made a name for himself, appearing in the documentary Basic Equipment by Paul Fenech.

In 1999, Bonez started making beats with the Dominion Crew. He also supported visiting US artists on Australian tours, DJing for performers including Murs, Aceyalone, Diverse and Mr. Lif, among others.

From 2000, DJ Bonez served as the DJ for Hyjak N Torcha. He produced their 2004 release Drastik Measures, his first full-length produced album, which gained national recognition and was the first Australian hip hop album to be selected as Triple J Album of the Week.

Shortly after Muphin and Plutonic Lab formed Muph & Plutonic in 2004, they toured in 2005 with DJ Bonez and Obese Records founder Pegz as the Milk Bar Stars. Bonez joined Muph & Plutonic in 2008, appearing on their album And Then Tomorrow Came and touring nationally across major cities, regional towns and festivals such as Big Day Out, Homebake, Trackside, Sounds of Spring and Pyramid Rock.

In 2007, Bonez produced Ninja Art, a remix record for Californian MC Omni, featuring Motion Man, Blade, Speaque Ezie and MC Mell 'O'. Released by Shogun Records, it was named "Best Album of 2007" by the Sydney Morning Herald and received high rotation on the national Triple J network.

The same year, Bonez released the solo compilation Roll Call through Obese Records, featuring local artists such as Funkoars, Pegz, Low Budget, Tommy I'llfigga and Muph, and international artists Lotek, Sandpeople, Rainman and Grand Agent. The album debuted at 35 on the ARIA Urban Chart, was named Album of the Week by JB Hi-Fi, gained high rotation on several radio stations and won that year's Best Compilation on OzHiphop.com. The video for "Certified" featuring Funkoars peaked at number 5 on the MTV Video Chart and won Best Video of 2007 at the OzHiphop.com awards; the "Roll Call" video featuring Sandpeople was featured by Rolling Stone online.

Bonez has produced albums and tracks featuring Ozi Batla ("Put It on Wax"), MC Trey (Tapastry Tunes), Blade, Motion Man, Grand Agent, Mystik Journeymen and Fraksha, and has supported numerous Australian and international artists live.

=== Recent work ===
In 2022, DJ Bonez released three new singles under his independent label Dlyte Pty Ltd: Uncut Raw (featuring Mad Skillz), Back (featuring Hau), and Make It Better (featuring Keith Murray). These works marked his return to recording and reinforced his reputation for collaborations with prominent Australian and international hip hop artists.

== Discography ==
=== Albums ===
- Hands On Decks (1999), Statik Recordings – CD, Album
- Drastik Measures (2004), Obese Records – CD, Album
- Roll Call (2007), Obese Records – CD/LP, Album (various artists)
- DJ Bonez Presents Omni – Ninja Art (2007), Shogun – CD/EP

=== Singles & EPs ===
- Aces High (2005), Obese Records – 12"
- Uncut Raw (featuring Mad Skillz) (2022), Dlyte Pty Ltd – Digital single
- Back (featuring Hau) (2022), Dlyte Pty Ltd – Digital single
- Make It Better (featuring Keith Murray) (2022), Dlyte Pty Ltd – 7" Single

=== DJ Break Records ===
- Bonebreaks Volume 1 (1999), Statik Recordings – 12"
- Bone Breaks Vol. 1 (2000), Statik Recordings – 12"
- Bone Breaks – Australasian Dragon Edition (2001), Statik Recordings – LP
- Vintage Vandal Breaks (2005), Statik Recordings – 12"

=== Compilations ===
- Bonez & Espa – Bonez & Espa's Lab Exposed (1999), Statik Recordings – CD, Compilation
- Culture Of Kings Volume 1 – track: "Wotcha Say?" by Mass MC & Torcha (2000), Obese Records – producer – CD/2xLP, Compilation
- Culture Of Kings Volume 2 – track: "Face the Music" by Hyjak (2002), Obese Records – producer – 2xCD, Compilation
- Culture Of Kings Volume 3 – track: "It's Over" by Hyjak N Torcha (2003), Obese Records – producer – CD/2xLP, Compilation
- Global Turntables – track: "A Different Drummer" (2002), Hip Hop Slam – CD, Compilation
- Triple J: Home And Hosed – Freshly Plucked – track: "Symphony" (2002), Not On Label – Compilation
- Full Effeucked (2004), Australian Broadcasting Corporation (ABC Music) – Compilation

=== Production ===
- Universal Soldier (LP), Tapastry Toons/Mother Tongues
- Kila Kombo (Vinyl, MiniAlbum) – Bo-nez Track, Kilawattz (1999)
- Overgrown Town (CD, Album), Full Effect – Cross Bred Mongrels (1999)
- Daily Affirmations (CD, Album), Tapastry Toons/Mother Tongues (2000)
- Mastermind Alliance (CD, Album) – Intro… Life, Interlude – Doublebeef Records (2000)
- Extra Credit Assignment #1 – "The Vehicle" (CD, Album) – Shut Up (Remix), Revenge Entertainment/Legendary Music (2002)
- Savage – "Swing" (Remix), Warner Music (2005)
- Phraze – "Here Now" (Remix), Universal Music (2005)
- Batterie (LP) – Batterie (Radio), NatAural High Records (2007)

=== Scratches ===
- Left Foot, Right Foot – track: "Elevation (RMX)" (2001), Not On Label – Hilltop Hoods
- The Calling – track: "Down for the Cause" (2003), Obese Records – Hilltop Hoods
- Axis – tracks: "The Last Bushman", "Mad..." (2005), Obese Records
- The Legacy Continues – tracks: "The Lions Roar", "Method..." (2006–2007), Hydrofunk Records
- And Then Tomorrow Came (2008), Muph & Plutonic – Obese Records – scratches
- Plus all scratches listed in Guest Appearances section

=== Guest appearances ===
- Hilltop Hoods – Left Foot, Right Foot (2001) – scratches on "Elevation (RMX)"
- Hilltop Hoods – The Calling (2003), Obese Records – scratches on "Down for the Cause" (featuring Hyjak and DJ Bonez)
- Muph & Plutonic – ...And Then Tomorrow Came (2008), Obese Records – scratches
- Ozi Batla – Wild Colonial (2010) – scratches on "Air Raid", "Integrity", "Mics, Peeps and Light", and "Put It on Wax"
- MC Trey – Tapastry Tunes – scratches
- Plutonic Lab – Codes Over Colours – scratches
- Trem – guest track appearances – scratches
- Bias B – Biaslife (2011), Wordburner Entertainment – scratches on "Midlife"
