= Plutonic Lab =

- Also known as: Pluto
- Born: Leigh Ryan; 6 December 1969 (age 56); Melbourne, Australia
- Origin: Melbourne, Australia
- Genres: Hip hop; soul; electronic
- Occupations: Record producer; drummer; engineer; artist
- Years active: 1995–present
- Labels: Obese; Nuffsaid; Wax Museum Records; Low Key Source; Shark Repellent
- Website: plutoniclab.com

Leigh Ryan, better known by the stage name Plutonic Lab or sometimes as Pluto is an Australian music producer, engineer, artist & performer.

He is also one half of soul/pop duo "SoundsLike FRANCO" with vocalist Natalie Slade, one third of Canadian/Australian rap group "SHWING" with BBRC members Roshin & Bronze as well as the international tour drummer for the group Hilltop Hoods.

Pluto has collaborated with Ladi6 (NZ), Black Milk (US), G-Love (US), Guilty Simpson (US), Wiley (UK) Miles Bonny (US), Natalie Slade (AU), Notes To Self BBRC (Canada), Coma-Chi (Japan) Renee Geyer (AU), Drapht (AU), Hilltop Hoods (AU), Dialectrix (AU), Speech Debelle (UK), Task Force (UK), Fat Lip (US), Eternia (Canada), The Grouch & Eligh (US).

== Early life and career ==
Plutonic Lab began drumming at the age of 10 and performing shows at 14. He obtained an honours degree in Sound Design/Media Arts from RMIT University, studying under Australian film composer/artist Philip Brophy and sound artist Phillip Samartzis.

In 1995 he produced the album "Mystery Shkool" for his group Macronauts on CD and Cassette & two beat tapes, Tri Chromes and M.O.S., in 1998 under his own label, Plutonic Lovely. In 2001, he released his first solo album, Give Me Sabotage Shell, followed by Collision of Days in 2004, both released on Nuff Said Records. His third solo album, Codes Over Colours, was released in 2005 on Obese Records. Taking 10 years between solo albums his last LP "Deep Above The Noise" won best Hip-Hop Album at the VIC Music Awards 2016. Attaining feature album status on Double J & 3PBS and Won 'Best Hip-Hop Album' at the AGE Music Victoria Awards 2016. The singles "The Crib" ft. Guilty Simpson & "Sliced Bread" ft Notes To Self BBRC received rotation on Triple J and Double J nationally.

Achievements

His album "Deep Above The Noise" won best Hip-Hop Album at the VIC Music Awards 2016. Attaining feature album status on Double J & 3PBS and Won 'Best Hip-Hop Album' at the AGE Music Victoria Awards 2016. The singles "The Crib" ft. Guilty Simpson & "Sliced Bread" ft Notes To Self BBRC received rotation on Triple J and Double J nationally.

Most recently nominated for "Engineer Of The Year" at the 2019 ARIA awards.

And won 2020 APRA Music Award "Most Performed Urban Work" with the "Leave Me Lonely" Hilltop Hoods.

He is a UK Mercury Prize Winner, (producing 2 singles for Speech Debelle's winning LP)

He produced Dialectrix's 2013 album, "The Cold Light of Day" which was shortlisted for the Australian Music Prize, won the 2009 UK Mercury Prize for his work with Speech Debelle, and was nominated for 'Best Urban Release' at the 2008 ARIA Awards as half of the hip-hop duo Muph & Plutonic, who also placed 2 songs in the Triple J's "Hottest 100" and landed the 'Triple J Feature Album' placements multiple times.

== Production ==
Plutonic Lab has produced albums and EPs for many Australian hip hop artists on labels including Nuffsaid Records (collaborating over a number of years with Australian MC/producer Prowla) and Obese Records (including the label CEO Pegz).

He has also produced beats on releases from Shawn Lov (USA), MC Tumi (South Africa), Karma and Esoteric (USA), Eternia (Canada) and Taskforce (UK).

He has performed shows in Australia, North America, Europe and Asia. Opening for The Pharcyde, People Under The Stairs, Ozomatli, Mad Professor, Lee Scratch Perry, MC Supernatural, DJ Shadow, Money Mark, Hilltop Hoods, The Next Men, Mr Lif, Cage, Swollen Members, Braintax & Mystro, Lupe Fiasco, El-P, Tricky, The Streets and events including Cockatoo Island Festival, Obese Block Party, Pyramid Rock Festival, Falls Festival, Big Day Out, Groovin' the Moo, Golden Plains Festival, Splendour in the Grass and Good Vibrations Festival.

Plutonic Lab was voted 'Best Producer' three years running (2004, 2005, 2006) on Australian Hip- Hop community site ozhiphop.com.

All three Muph & Plutonic Albums & Pegz "Axis" LP obtained 'Feature Album' status on Australian national broadcaster Triple J.

His third LP "Codes Over Colours" was a featured album on Melbourne's 3RRR radio, and on other independent radio programs nationally.

In 2008 The Album "And Then Tomorrow Came" was nominated for an ARIA. The album also landed two songs in Triple J Hottest 100, 2009.

Speech Debelle's "Speech Therapy" LP won UK's Mercury Prize in 2009, for which Plutonic Lab produced two singles.

His music has also been featured in film and television including HBO's series Girls, TNT's series Franklin & Bash, and the feature films X, Noel Clarke's 4.3.2.1 and Chronicle.

He also produced Neon Heartache, the debut album of Jess Harlen, who was named best female artist in The Age's EG Awards in 2010.

== Discography ==
=== Solo albums ===
Album title	Release date	Label	Format
Tri Chromes (beat tape)	1998	Plutonic Lovely	Cassette
M.O.S. (beat tape)	1998	Plutonic Lovely	Cassette
Give Me Sabotage Shell	2001	Nuffsaid	CD/vinyl
Collision of Days	2004	Nuffsaid	CD/vinyl
Codes Over Colours	2005	Obese	CD/vinyl
Midnight on Pluto (remix EP)	2006	Obese	Vinyl
Give Me Sabotage Shell (Extended/Remastered)	2007	Shark Repellent	CD
Collision of Days (Extended/Remastered)	2007	Shark Repellent	CD
Submariner (7-inch EP)	2013	LWP	Vinyl
Deep Above The Noise (2x12" LP)	2016	Wax Museum Records	Vinyl

=== Production ===
==== Albums ====
Artist	Album title	Release date	Label
Macronauts	Mystery Shkool (CD/Cassette)	1995	Plutonic Lovely
Prowla	Lonewolf (CD/LP)	2001	Nuffsaid
Plutonic Lab	Give Me Sabotage Shell (CD/LP)	2001	Nuffsaid
Muphin	More Than Music (CD/LP)	2003	Obese
Pegz	Capricorn Cat (CD/LP)	2003	Obese
Shawn Lov	The Blackout of 1977 (CD/LP)	2004	Nuffsaid
Plutonic Lab	Collision of Days (CD/LP)	2004	Nuffsaid
Muph & Plutonic	Hunger Pains (CD/LP)	2004	Obese
Pegz	Axis (CD/2×LP)	2005	Obese
Plutonic Lab	Codes Over Colours (CD/2×LP)	2005	Obese
Omni	Batterie (CD/LP)	2006	BLX
Muph & Plutonic	Silence the Sirens (CD/2×LP)	2006	Obese
Ivens	Sounds to Expire to (CD)	2007	EcoTone
Lotek	Go (CD)	2007	2–99 Records
Pegz	Burn City (CD/LP)	2007	Obese
Muph & Plutonic	...And Then Tomorrow Came (CD/2×LP)	2008	Obese
Speech Debelle	Speech Therapy (CD/LP)	2009	Big Dada
Gully Platoon	The Great Divide (CD)	2009	Obese
Jess Harlen	Neon Heartache	2010	Plethora
Dialectrix	Audio Projectile	2010	Obese
Plutonic & G Love	Moonshine Lemonade	2011	Inertia
Jess Harlen	Park Yard Slang	2012	Plethora
Dialectrix	The Cold Light of Day	2013	Obese
Plutonic Lab	Submariner (7-inch EP)	2013	LWP
Plutonic Lab	Fieldnotes - Hong Kong (Book & Vinyl)	2016	Fieldnotes Project
Plutonic Lab	Deep Above The Noise (2×LP)	2016	Wax Museum Records
Plutonic Lab	Fieldnotes - Japan (Book & Vinyl)	2017	Fieldnotes Project
Sounds Like FRANCO	FRANCO (12-inch)	2019	Low Key Source

==== Singles and EPs ====
Artist	Title	Release date	Label
Pegz (as Pegasus)	Pegasus (12-inch)	2001	Obese
Prowla	The Great Rescue (EP)	2002	Nuffsaid
Tumi	A Dream Led To This (EP)	2002	Nuffsaid
Taskforce & Pegz	12 Apostles (12-inch)	2002	Obese
Karma	Top Shelf (12-inch)	2002	Nuffsaid
Eternia & A-Love	Movin (12-inch)	2003	Warner
Shawn Lov	Dewitt (12-inch)	2004	Nuffsaid
Black Samurai	Kill Em All (EP)	2004	C Side (UK)
Muph & Plutonic	Heaps Good (12-inch)	2004	Obese
Pegz	Chechen Gorilla (12-inch)	2005	Obese
Pegz	Back Then (12-inch)	2005	Obese
Plutonic Lab	The Waiting (12-inch)	2005	Obese
Hilltop Hoods	The Hard Road (12-inch)	2006	Obese
Ivens	The 9th Letter (12-inch)	2007	EcoTone
Muph & Plutonic	The Day Off (7-inch)	2007	Obese
Muph & Plutonic	"Size of the Soul" (Promo CD single)	2008	Obese
Muph & Plutonic	"Beautiful/Ugly" (Promo CD single)	2008	Obese
Speech Debelle	The Key (CD single)	2009	Big Dada
Speech Debelle	Better Days (CD single)	2009	Big Dada
Jess Harlen	Watch the Water (CD single)	2010	Plethora
Jess Harlen	I Go (CD single)	2010	Plethora
Dialectrix	New Generation (CD single)	2012	Obese
Dialectrix	Go (Digital single)	2013	Obese
Plutonic Lab	Look Alive ft. Dialectrix (7-inch)	2013	Shark Repellent
Plutonic Lab	The Crib ft. Guilty Simpson (7-inch)	2016	Wax Museum Records
Plutonic Lab	Sliced Bread ft. Notes To Self BBRC (Digital Single)	2016	Wax Museum Records
Plutonic Lab	Blind Eyes / Give It Up (7-inch)	2018	Low Key Source
Sounds Like FRANCO	It's All On You (Digital Single)	2018	Low Key Source
Sounds Like FRANCO	Money Over Matter (Digital Single)	2019	Low Key Source
Hilltop Hoods	Leave Me Lonely (7-inch, Single, Ltd)	2019	HTHV005
SHWING	SHWING (Lock It Down) (Digital single)	2019	Golden Era Records
SHWING	ANYBODY (Digital single)	2019	Golden Era Records
Plutonic Lab	Enemy featuring Black Milk	2020	Low Key Source

==== Tracks on other albums ====
Album title	Artist	Track	Release date	Label
Evolutionary Vibes 2	Macronauts	"Atstrue" (remix)	1997	Creative Vibes
4 Element Effect	Plutonic Lab	"Evidence"	1998	183
Rock Da City	Plutonic Lab	"Slipping into Darkness"	1999	Nuffsaid
Rock Da City	Madlock	"Madlock"	1999	Nuffsaid
Sounds Like Left	Plutonic Lab	"Mental Big Gun" (remix)	2001	Sony (Asia)
Sounds Like Left	Plutonic Lab	"Sunshine"	2001	Sony (Asia)
12 Apostles	Pegz & Task Force	"True to tha Art" (vocal) "True to tha Art" (instrumental)	2001	Obese
Stealth Issue 2 Vol 3	Plutonic Lab	"Glory Days"	2001	Stealth
Top Fashion Dolphin (EP)	Plutonic Lab	"Mental Big Gun"	2002	C Side (UK)
Top Fashion Dolphin (EP)	Tumi	"The Inner View"	2002	C Side (UK)
Culture of Kings Vol 2	A-Love	"Petty"	2002	Obese
Obese City	Plutonic Lab	"Knowing Disintegration"	2002	Obese
Obese City	Muphin	"Tape in a Green Case"	2002	Obese
Other Worldly Fusions	Plutonic Lab & RuCL	"Runnin Hot"	2002	Hardware
Top Shelf	Karma featuring Esoteric	"Top Shelf" (vocal) "Top Shelf" (instrumental)	2002	Nuffsaid
Top Shelf	Karma	"Art of War" (vocal) "Art of War" (instrumental)	2002	Nuffsaid
Strait From The Art Vol 1	Eternia & A-Love	"Movin"	2003	Warner
Diggin Deep	Muphin	"Smart Risk, Big Benefit"	2003	
Culture of Kings Vol 3	Pegz	"Tins of Beans"	2004	Obese
Building With Bricks Volume 2	Karma	"Art of War"	2004	Brick
Descore	Breakfast News (Main Title); 100 Forms of Happiness		2004	Sound Punch
15.OZ Vinyl	Muphin	"Smoke Stained"	2004	Crookneck
JJJ Hip Hop Show	Muph & Plutonic	"Heaps Good"	2005	
JJJ Hip Hop Show	MC Que	"Waters Breakin"	2005	
Home And Hosed – Ripe and Ready	Muph & Plutonic	"Heaps Good"	2005	
Trampled: Remix (EP) (Elefant Traks)	Hermitude	"Nightfalls Messenger" (remix)	2006	Obese
Been There Done That	Bias B featuring Billy Bunks	"Bundle of Bees"	2007	Obese
The Signal	Urthboy	"We Get Around" (Plutonic remix)	2007	Elefant Tracks
More or Less	Resin Dogs featuring Mika 9, Aceyalone and Abstract Rude	"Coming With the Sound" (Plutonic Lab mix)	2009	Hydrofunk Records/MGM
Cover Up Motel	TZU	"Get Up" (Plutonic Lab remix)	2009	Liberation
Beatz International	Tor	"Pushin It"	2009	File Records (Japan)/UK Streetsounds (UK)

==== Battle vinyl ====
Artist	Title	Date	Details
DJ Perplex	DMC Battle Wax	2008	Various production beats and elements
DJ Perplex	DMC Battle Wax	2009	Various production beats and elements

==== Soundtracks ====
Title	Director	Notes
Hot Wet Dot: 16mm Skate Film	Jo Harrison	www.joskefilms.com
Molotow Masters: Graffiti Series	Jo Harrison	www.molotow.com
Words in My Mouth Voices in My Head, No 1 Anna	Phillip Brophy	Screened at ACMI Melbourne, 2004 philipbrophy.com
Burn	David Selvarajah Vadiveloo	Nominated for AFI Best Short Fiction Film award, 2009 burn-movie.com.au

== Awards and nominations ==
=== Music Victoria Awards ===
The Music Victoria Awards are an annual awards night celebrating Victorian music. They commenced in 2006.

Year	Nominee / work	Award	Result	Ref.
2016	Deep Above the Noise	Best Hip Hop Album	Won	
