= Axis (Pegz album) =

Studio album by Pegz
- Released: 25 September 2005
- Recorded: Obese Studios / Crossbreed Studios
- Genre: Hip hop
- Length: 45:35
- Label: Obese
- Producer: Plutonic Lab, Suffa

Pegz chronology
Capricorn Cat (2003)	Axis (2005)	Burn City (2007)

Professional ratings
Review scores
Source	Rating
Australian Music Online	(not rated)
In the Mix	(not rated)
Groove On	(not rated)

Axis is the second album released by Australian hip hop artist MC Pegz. It was released in 2005, 18 months after his debut album. This recording was solely produced by Plutonic Lab, (with the exception of This Is For Life, which is co-produced by Suffa) and features appearances from American hip hop duo Debaser and local artists Hilltop Hoods and Hyjak N Torcha. Pegz's sister, Reagen Staaf, also contributes additional vocals on "Back Then" and "Fuckin' Wid Pegz".

== Track listing ==
All tracks written by Tirren Staaf and Leigh Ryan unless otherwise noted.

1. "Intro" (Tirren Staaf) – 0:30
2. "Chechen Gorilla" – 4:06
3. "Back Then" (Tirren Staff, M Lambert) – 3:28
4. "Cro-Magnon" (Tirren Staaf) – 3:03
5. "This Is For Life" (featuring Hilltop Hoods) (Tirren Staaf) – 3:56
6. "What Would Happen?" – 4:15
7. "Fuckin' Wid Pegz" – 3:45
8. "Two Sides Of the Map" (featuring Debaser) – 3:34
9. "The Last Bushman" – 3:21
10. "Blink Of An Eye" – 3:11
11. "Put the World On Hold" – 2:55
12. "Mad Luv" (featuring Hyjak N Torcha) – 3:27
13. "Living On Earth" – 2:43
14. "Zenith" – 3:21

== Credits ==
- Artwork – Mexi
- Mastered – Chris Chetland (Kog Mastering)
- Photography – Andrew Boyle
- Producer – Plutonic Lab (tracks: 1 to 4, 6, 8 to 14)
- Recorded By, Mixed by – Pegz (tracks: 1 to 4, 6, 8 to 14), Plutonic Lab (tracks: 1 to 4, 6, 8 to 14)
