= Debaser (rap group) =

American hip hop group

Debaser is an American two-man hip-hop group from Oregon, United States, and are part of the crew Sandpeople. The duo consists of Ethic (MC) & Sapient (MC/Producer) and was founded in late 2005. Their name is a direct reference to the definition of the word debaser, not to be confused with the popular song Debaser by the Pixies.

== History ==
Ethic & Sapient both grew up in the city of Eugene, Oregon where they were family friends at a young age. It wasn't until 2005 that the two began making music together and the group Debaser was quickly formed the same year.

In early 2006, Debaser juggled driving from Eugene to Portland on weekends to record Sandpeople projects with doing shows in the Pacific Northwest & recording their debut album Crown Control, which featured Opio (of Hieroglyphics), Luckyiam (of Living Legends), Grayskul and Sleep (of Oldominion). They began touring as a group regularly throughout the Western United States in 2007.

Debaser spent much of 2008 & 2009 working on music with their crew Sandpeople and touring. During that time, Sapient also focused on establishing himself as a producer. He has since made beats for tracks that featured Inspectah Deck of Wu-Tang Clan, Slug of Atmosphere, and Aesop Rock to name a few.

In late 2009, they released a follow-up to Crown Control as a free album named Back to Work. It was offered exclusively as a download on Sandpeople's website and features Phat Kat, Rasco and Luckyiam.

Debaser released the album Peerless on May 4, 2010. The 14-song album features The Grouch, Cage & Eyedea.

Before Debaser was formed, Ethic spent a little over one-year in Australia living in the city of Melbourne, Victoria. During his time there, Ethic collaborated with many of Australia's most heralded artists including Bliss n Eso who have featured the MC on two of their albums. He also appeared on the album Interview with a Madman by Mark Brandon "Chopper" Read, a man considered to be a part of "Australia's criminal folklore," and was a judge for the first ever MC battle between Australia & New Zealand.

== Discography ==
=== Albums ===
- Crown Control (2006)
- Back to Work (2009)
- Peerless (2010)

=== Singles ===
- "Nothing but Silence" (12" vinyl) - Obese Records

=== Compilations and appearances ===
- Points of View - Sandpeople (2004)
- All in Vain - Sandpeople (2005)
- Axis - Pegz (2005)
- Interview with a Madman - Chopper Read (2006)
- Sandpeople Presents... - Sandpeople (2006)
- The One & Only - Al-One & Only One (2006)
- Roll Call - DJ Bonez (2007)
- Honest Racket - Sandpeople (2007)
- B-Sides, Vol. 1 - Sandpeople (2007)
- Flying Colours - Bliss n Eso (2008)
- B-Sides, Vol. 2 - Sandpeople (2009)
- Long, Story Short - EP - Sandpeople (2009)
