= Hunger Pains =

Studio album by Muph & Plutonic
- Released: 20 October 2004
- Recorded: 'Two Rooms on a Budget' / Crookneck Studios
- Genre: Australian hip hop
- Length: 47:45
- Label: Obese Records
- Producer: Plutonic Lab

Muph & Plutonic chronology
Hunger Pains (2004)	Silence the Sirens (2006)

Hunger Pains is the debut album from Muph & Plutonic and was released on 20 October 2004. It received national airplay on Triple J radio station.

== Reception ==
Professional ratings
Review scores
Source	Rating
In the Mix	(positive)
Triple J	(not rated)
Urban Smarts	(positive)
The Sydney Morning Herald	2.5/5 stars
Herald-Sun	(positive)

Triple J's reviewer described Hunger Pains "Putting their experiences and talents together to honestly reflect Australian life as they see it, Muph + Plutonic sample, scratch and rap their way through tracks."

== Track listing ==
1. "Intro" - 0:32
2. "Work Hard" - 3:13
3. Skit - 0:12
4. "Heaps Good" - 4:01
5. "Raise Ya Voice" (feat. Nicola) - 3:53
6. "Gimme Tha Mic" - 3:32
7. "Beer Goggles" - 4:18
8. "Moment of Clarity" - 4:09
9. "The Jason Chapman Sway" - 3:08
10. "Scars and Stains" (feat. Minas of Art of War) - 3:39
11. "Becoming Agrophobic" - 4:17
12. "Hunger Pains (feat. Raph Boogie of Mnemonic Ascent) - 3:48
13. "Paracetamol" - 4:27
14. "Your Choice 'Kings'" (feat. The Grouch of Living Legends) - 4:36
