= Adam Stevens =

Adam Stevens may refer to:

- Adam Stevens (hip hop artist) (born 1974), or Bias B, Australian rapper
- Adam Stevens (NASCAR) (born 1978), American auto racing crew chief
- Adam Stevens (Neighbours), a fictional character

== See also ==
- Adam Stephens (disambiguation)
