= Hyjak N Torcha =

Australian hip hop group

- Origin: Sydney, New South Wales, Australia
- Genre: Hip hop
- Years active: 2000–present
- Label: Obese Records
- Members: Hyjak; Torcha; DJ Bonez
- Website: http://www.myspace.com/hyjakntorcha

Hyjak N Torcha is an Australian hip hop group from Sydney, New South Wales.

== Biography ==
The group formed in 2000, consisting of Hyjak (Jack McCarthy), Torcha (John Chmielewski), and DJ Bonez (George Kordas).

Hyjak first appeared on the scene in 1998, at the age of fifteen he snuck into a pub in the Sydney suburb of Kings Cross to compete in a rap battle, which he won. Torcha, hailing from Sydney's west, was an active volunteer youth worker, doing programs in youth prisons and performing at anti-war rallies. Formally part of Sydney's Eth-nik Tribe, another Australian hip hop group.

Hyjak N Torcha signed to Obese Records and their first album Drastik Measures was released in 2004. "Sneak", a single from that album, received airplay on Triple J and the video clip was played on rage. The album was reviewed on Triple J's website. They have since performed with artists including the Hilltop Hoods, De La Soul, Xzibit, Mobb Deep, Gang Starr, Lord Finesse, Swollen Members, Murs and Ice Cube. The group's members are also affiliated with Dominion, an Australian hip hop crew.

Hyjak N Torcha have made guest appearances (together and separately) on records by artists including Hilltop Hoods (Hyjak performed on Hilltop Hoods' album The Calling), Bliss n Eso (Hyjak did a guest verse on the track "Get Loose" on their album Day of the Dog) and Pegz (Hyjak and Torcha appeared on Pegz's Axis album).

They also released a videoclip for their track "A Night with Chopper", featuring Mark Brandon "Chopper" Read, from his album, Interview with a Madman, which, in 2006, won the award for 'Best New Filmmaker' (Matt Chuang) at the BelowGround Music Video Fest Awards.

The group released their second album, Unregrettable, in 2009. The album was produced by Mules and features appearances by Murs, N'fa and S.Q.Z.

== Solo careers ==
=== Hyjak ===
Hyjak released his first solo EP in 2002 "Breaking Sound Barriers" through Statik Recordings, DJ Bonez produced the whole EP and it was released on limited 12" inch vinyl.

In 2006, Hyjak released a mixtape, Shady Characters featuring Torcha, Kye, Bliss N Eso and others. He also performed on a track for Jase's single "Nutcase".

In 2011, Hyjak released a mixtape called The Reminder Mixtape featuring Kerser, Chow. P and Thorn.

Hyjak released a solo LP, Light at the End of the Tunnel, in 2013, distributed by Obese Records.

Two years later Hyjak released his second LP "Stage Diving With No Crowd", released on CD and digital.

=== Torcha ===
Torcha formed a five-piece band, A Broken Silence, with keyboardist B-Don (Brendon Costello), guitarist Cactus (Daniel Bartulovich), bass player Boots (Simon Lennon) and drummer Nathan Tuffin. The band attracted the attention of Tim Freedman, who collaborated with Torcha on "The Road is Lost", the first single from the band's debut album, All For What, released in 2009. Torcha played the song whilst touring around Australia with Freedman's band, The Whitlams, with the Sydney Symphony Orchestra. The album also features guests appearances from Ozi Batla (The Herd), Patriarch (USA) and DJ Skizo.

Torcha released his solo LP, Frozen State, together with producer B-Don in 2010. The beats were created without any use of samples and the instruments are mostly played by B-Don. The album features guest appearances from N'fa, Hyjak, S.Q.Z, 2furious and also Korean mega-star Bobby Kim with his crew Buga Kingz.

== Discography ==
=== Albums ===
- Drastik Measures - Obese (OBR016) (2004)
- Unregrettable - Obese (OBR066) (2009)

=== Singles ===
- "Sneak" - Obese (2004)

=== Compilation appearances ===
- Lab Exposed - Volume 1 (1999), Statik Recordings (songs: "Kryptonite + Hijak", "Ill Combat", "Best Kept Secret")
- The Fourth Element Effect (1999), Blitzkrieg (songs: "Wack or Dope", "Yeast Infection")
- Culture of Kings - Volume 2(2002), Obese Records (song: "Face The Music")
- Obesecity (2002), Obese Records (song: "Point of No Return")
- Culture of Kings - Volume 3 (2003), Obese Records (song: "It's Over")
- Straight From The Art 2 (2004), Warner Bros. Records (song: "The Science")
- Home And Hosed - Freshly Plucked (2004), ABC Music (song: "Corrected")
- Chopper Read - Interview with a Madman (2006), Rott'n Records (song: "Night With Chopper")
- The Stolen Records (2007), FBi Records (song: "The Test")
- The Whitlams - Greatest Hits, ft Torcha and A Broken Silence (song: "The Road is Lost")

=== Hyjak solo works ===
- Breaking Sound Barriers (2002) (EP) - Statik Recordings (DSR-006)
- Shady Characters (2006)
- Light at the End of the Tunnel (2013) (LP) - Obese Records
- Stage Diving With No Crowd (2015) (LP) - All Out Records

==== Tracks with other artists ====
- Kerser and Hyjak, "Roll on Up" and "I Remember" (2011)
- Rates and Hyjak, "Suicide" (2013)

=== Torcha solo works ===
- A Broken Silence All For What... - Bad Seed/MGM Distribution (ABS002) (16 October 2009)
- Torcha & B-Don Frozen State - Independent/Obese (TNB001) (5 March 2010)
