= Good Gracious =

First album by Australian hip hop producer M-Phazes

Studio album by M-Phazes
- Released: February 2010
- Genre: Hip hop
- Length: 66:16
- Label: Obese
- Producer: M-Phazes

M-Phazes chronology
Good Gracious (2010)	Phazed Out (2012)

Good Gracious is the first album by Australian hip hop producer M-Phazes. Released in February 2010 on Obese Records, each track features different artists, including Drapht, Bliss n Eso, Illy and Forthwrite (360 and Pez).

At the J Awards of 2010, the album was nominated for Australian Album of the Year.

== Reception ==
Reviewer and Triple J announcer Dom Alessio described the album as "a veritable roll call of Aussie hip-hop’s patricians, it’s indicative of the amount of kudos in the bank for M-Phazes", adding "Good Gracious really serves as a great introduction into the stronger facets of Australian hip-hop." Dan Rule of The Vine described it as "an incredibly well balanced record and one that exemplifies M-Phazes’ deft ability to craft not just a kicking beat, but a full-length album of them." A review on Sputnik Music praised the production and beats.

== Track listing ==
Good Gracious track listing
No.	Title	Length
1.	"For What It's Worth" (featuring Solo)	4:52
2.	"Where's Elvis?" (featuring Drapht)	3:54
3.	"The Freak Show" (featuring Mantra)	4:13
4.	"Goodbye Gravity" (featuring Muph & Plutonic with Candice Monique)	3:48
5.	"Home" (featuring Delta)	3:29
6.	"Blind Man" (featuring Pegz)	4:11
7.	"Long Winding Road" (featuring Spit Syndicate)	4:31
8.	"Music Box" (featuring Phrase)	3:59
9.	"The Club Song" (featuring Forthwrite (360 and Pez))	4:03
10.	"Keep Running" (featuring N'fa)	4:05
11.	"Triumph" (featuring 13th Son)	5:01
12.	"Walk On Clouds" (featuring Bliss n Eso)	3:48
13.	"The Facilitator" (featuring Dialectrix)	2:21
14.	"That's What We On" (featuring Nine High)	6:38
15.	"Take It from Me" (featuring Illy)	7:23
16.	"Turn Their Backs" (featuring Haunts [bonus track on iTunes])	3:57
Total length:		66:16

== Charts ==
Chart performance for Good Gracious
Chart (2010)	Peak position
Australian Albums (ARIA)	20
