= Reason (Australian rapper) =

Australian hip hop artist

Jason Shulman
- Also known as: Reason, Rea', MC Reason
- Born: 1972 (age 52–53)
- Origin: Melbourne, Victoria, Australia
- Genres: Hip hop
- Occupation(s): Teacher, musician
- Instrument: Vocals
- Years active: 1988–2011

Jason Shulman (born 1972), previously known by the stage names Reason, Rea' or MC Reason, is a retired Australian hip hop artist, who works as a secondary school teacher. He released four studio albums: Solid (2000), Reography (2002), One Step Ahead (2004) and Window of Time (2011), before retiring from his music career.

== Early life and education ==
Shulman was born in 1972 and grew up in a upper-class area in the south-east suburbs of Melbourne, Victoria, becoming acquainted with local hip hop music while still at school during the 1980s.

He attended Melbourne University, where he majored in Aboriginal studies.

== Music career ==
Shulman recorded his first tracks in 1988. Apart from hip hop, his musical influences include Australian music of the 1970s and 80s, including Midnight Oil and Australian reggae. During the 1990s, he became involved in an educational initiative called the Push, which ran workshops on hip hop and contemporary urban cultures to young people in lower socio-economic regions of Victoria. He was also the DJ of Hittin' Switches, a long-running community radio program which played Australian hip hop music.

He adopted the moniker Reason for his musical identity, and has also been known as Rea' and MC Reason.

He recorded his work on Obese Records, with his album Solid (2000) produced by Jolz, being the first release on the label. and is known for inspiring and uniting other hip hop artists, including Illy, Sereck (of Def Wish Cast), Hilltop Hoods, Pegz, and Briggs.

He released his second album, Reography, in 2002. His third album, One Step Ahead, included remixes of several tracks from this album. In them, he is patriotic but also includes criticism of several aspects of Australian culture.

Reason has toured to Brisbane, Adelaide, Sydney, and Canberra.

== Other activities ==
He hosted many DMC DJ competition finals in Melbourne.

Shulman works as a high school teacher, teaching chemistry and Australian history at Mount Scopus Memorial College in Melbourne (as of 2006). He has also organised hip hop musical events by artists such as the Hilltop Hoods, and run graffiti workshops and DJ events at the school, and run music workshops in rural Indigenous Australian communities.

== Influence ==
Tony Mitchell of UTS Sydney described his work thus:

Reason is a key practitioner in the Melbourne scene and records on the Obese label, having produced two EPs and two albums to date, Reography and One Step Ahead, which have been important in terms of contributing to a distinctively Australian hip hop linguistic idiom, history and identity as well as a concern with a range of political and social issues. He has also been extensively involved in the local hip hop scene as both an educator and a producer of experimental histories of Australian culture and politics.

After announcing his retirement in November 2011, he was described as one music critic as "an indisputable forefather of the Australian hip hop scene as we know it today".

== Personal life ==
As of 2011 Shulman is married, and has a daughter.

== Discography ==
- Solid (album, 2000)
- Reography (album, 2002)
- One Step Ahead (album, 2004)
- Life's a Lesson (EP, 2006?)
- Window of Time (album, 2011)
