= Obese Records =

Defunct Australian hip hop record label

Coordinates: 37°50′56″S 144°59′32″E

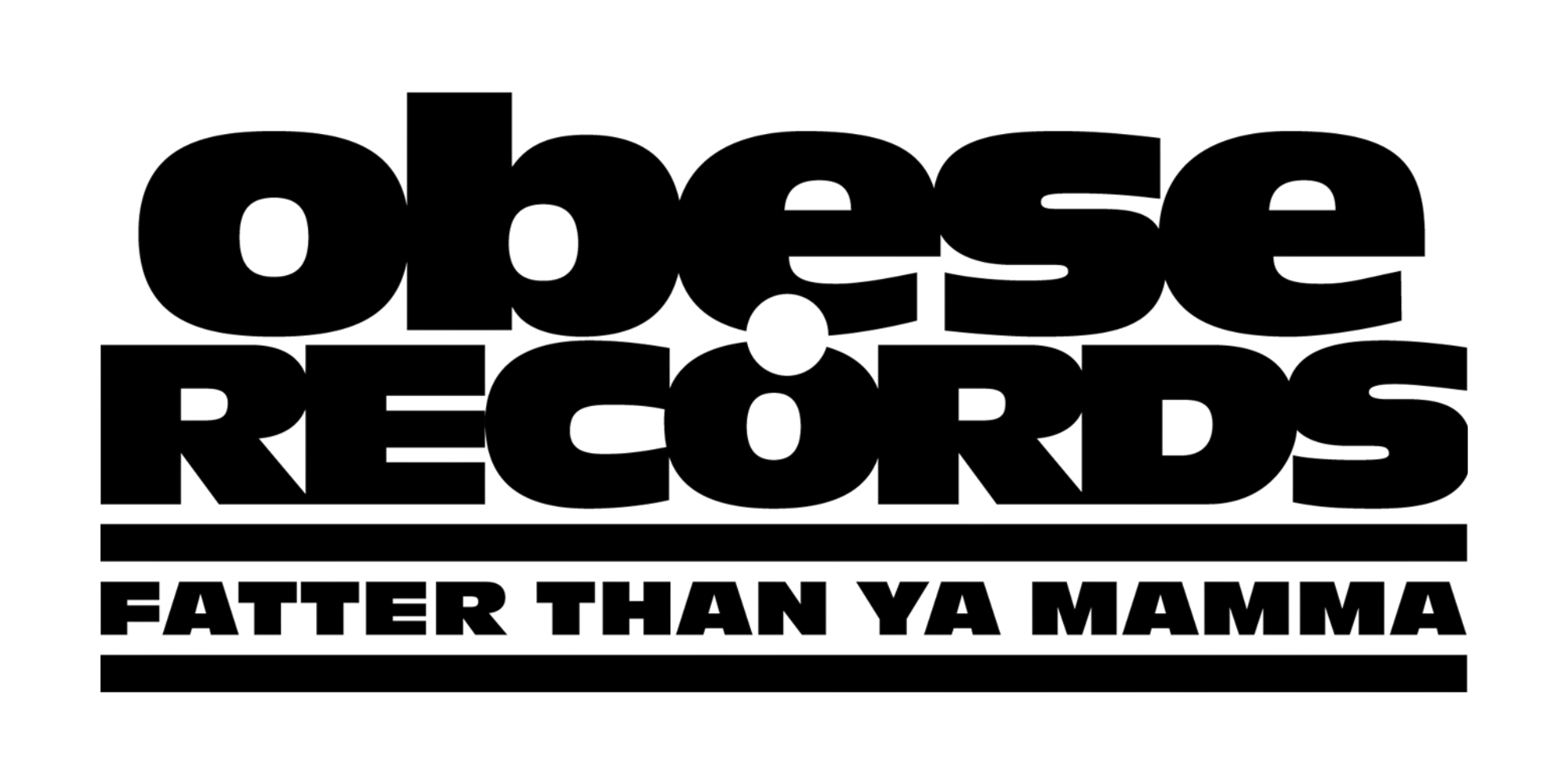
- Parent company: Warner Music Group
- Founded: 1995
- Founder: Ollie Bobbit
- Defunct: 2016
- Status: Defunct
- Distributor: Atlantic Records
- Genre: Hip-hop
- Country of origin: Australia
- Location: Melbourne
- Official website: obeserecords.com

Obese Records was an Australian hip-hop record label based in Melbourne, Victoria. One of the largest independent hip-hop labels in Australia, Obese has been credited with legitimising the Australian hip-hop genre and was home to acts such as Hilltop Hoods, Illy, Kerser, Thundamentals, Reason and Dialectrix. Obese Records also operated two retail stores in the suburbs of Prahran (later moving to South Yarra in 2014) and Frankston, Zoo Records, a distribution company for non-Australian music, Plethora Records, a soul label, and their own management and touring company, Obese Records Artist Management.

== History ==
=== 1995–2004: Early years ===
In 1995, graffiti writer and DJ Ollie Bobbit opened up a record store at 4A Izett Street, located within the Melbourne suburb of Prahran called "O.B.'s Records." With only A$2000, one clothes rack and one crate of vinyl, Bobbit started the business in the back of a skateboarding store in the neighbouring Greville Street, before eventually relocating to Izett Street. In 1998, Bobbit sold the business to Shazlek One (Shaheen Waheed), who changed the name to "Obese Records" as a pun on his weight made by Bias B (Adam Stevens). Shazlek laid down the early foundations for the store's in-house record label, which launched in 2000. Its first two releases were Reason's Solid and the first volume of the Culture of Kings compilation album series, both of which came out that year. In 2002, the store was bought by rapper and Obese employee Pegz (Tirren Staaf), who had been affiliated with the business since 1996 and had worked at the Izett Street retail store since 2000.

According to Pegz, there were few other labels specialising in Australian hip-hop at the time, and none who were putting significant funds into marketing, with him stating "It was about giving the people around me the opportunity they deserved." Pegz used the label to create a distribution network, and in 2005 he purchased the Zenith Records vinyl pressing plant, one of only two companies then still pressing vinyl records in Australia. The pressing plant was subsequently sold in November 2007.

Under Pegz's new management, the label's first release was a second volume of Culture of Kings in October 2002, which featured formative releases from Hilltop Hoods, Bliss n Eso, Funkoars, TZU, Urthboy, Hunter, Koolism, Terra Firma, Lyrical Commission, Downsyde, Layla, DJ Bonez, Delta, Brad Strut, Bias B, Hospice and Brothers Stoney, and was the first Australian hip-hop album to be selected for the Triple J feature album spot. A sister compilation, ObeseCity, was also released by the label later that year. Pegz described these compilations as "key networking tools" for the growing Australian hip-hop scene.

In 2003, Obese released the Hilltop Hoods album The Calling, which became the first Australian hip-hop album to go gold. Mark Pollard, founder of Stealth Magazine, commented during an interview with Tony Mitchell in 2004 that Hilltop Hoods’ success had been helped by Obese.

— Mark Pollard, founder of Stealth Magazine (2004)

In 2003, Hilltop Hoods released their breakout album, The Calling, under the Obese label. The album was the first Australian hip hop album to be certified Gold and Platinum in 2004 and 2006 respectively, and has been credited by critics and fans alike with "legitimising" Australian hip hop and helping it become a commercially viable genre.

=== 2005–2015: Expansion and later years ===
In 2006, Hilltop Hoods were nominated and won awards for Best Performing Independent Album (The Hard Road) and Best Independent Artist at that year's Australian Independent Record Labels Association (AIR) Chart Awards.

Two artists associated with the label were nominated for four AIR Chart Awards in 2007; three for Hilltop Hoods and one for Muph & Plutonic. At the 2007 ARIA Awards, the Hilltop Hoods won 'Best Urban Release' for their album The Hard Road: Restrung. The Hilltop Hoods DVD, The City of Light, released by Obese Records in 2007, has also been classified gold. In 2008, two artists on the Obese label, Muph & Plutonic and Spit Syndicate, received nominations for 'Best Urban Album' at the ARIA Awards. In 2010 M-Phazes' album, Good Gracious, was nominated for 'Best Urban Album' at the ARIA Awards.

In 2008, Hilltops Hoods departured from Obese Records to start their own label, Golden Era Records, with EMI. Obese continued to focus on both established artists and underground local acts and founded the subsidiary soul label Plethora Records in 2009.

In 2012, Obese filmed a new web series, Obese TV, which focused on delivering news about the scene and interviews with Australian hip-hop artists. In 2013, Obese Records signed its first management contract with Kerser, as well as already having divisions for sales, publicity, marketing, accounts and A&R. On 8 March that same year, Obese expanded its retail operations into a second store on 6 Wells Street in the Melbourne suburb of Frankston, which stocked music, merchandise, street apparel, spray paint, art supplies, DVDs and street art magazines.

Periscope Pictures announced on 19 September 2013 that Obese Records would be distributing its documentary Hunter: For The Record locally in Australia. The feature film chronicles hip-hop artist Robert Hunter before his death from cancer in 2011. Hunter had released all his albums on Obese, and in conjunction with the DVD, the label released his final album, Bring it All Back, posthumously.

In 2014, Obese Records relocated from its original spot at 4A Izett Street in Prahran, to 211 Commercial Road in South Yarra, and in the following year, sold its Frankston store just two years after opening.

=== 2016–present: Closure and legacy ===
On 7 May 2016, after 21 years, Pegz shut down Obese Records. While no specific reasons were given, Pegz released a short statement the week before, expressing his gratitude:

"I am so thankful for the times we shared. We ruled the country for a beautiful moment. The little record store that launched Australian hip-hop to the masses. Thank you for your amazing support and contribution over her 21 years."

Following the shutdown, artists and fans took to Facebook to share anecdotes and memories of the business. Dialectrix stated "No one has been more instrumental in helping my music career than Pegz and everyone who’s helped me over the years at Obese Records," and Hau Latukefu (of Koolism) stated "At one point, you couldn't go anywhere without seeing an 'Obese Records: Fatter Than Ya Mama' sticker posted on a wall, a street sign or a car's back window. It's safe to say, local hip hop wouldn't be where it is now without their input."

In 2026, a documentary covering the history of Melbourne's hip-hop scene titled "Undeniable: The Evolution of Melbourne Hip-Hop" was released, and featured interviews from all kinds of persons involved with the history of Australian hip-hop, including former staff and artists affiliated with Obese Records. DJ FX (Kerris Aickin) stated in the film "Obese Records were like the saving grace for hip-hop music in Melbourne."

== Staff ==
- Tirren Staaf – CEO
- Fern Greig-Moore – Operations Manager, Artist Management
- Lindsey Martin – Publicity, Communications
- Lee Rawlings – Sales, Distribution

== Distribution ==
Obese Records Distribution provided distribution for the following labels, in addition to Obese Records:

- The Ayems
- Born Fresh
- Broken Tooth Entertainment
- Crate Cartel
- Fat Beats
- Karsniogenics
- Lookup
- Myspherical
- Nuff Said Records
- Plethora Records
- Uknowho Records
- WordBurner Entertainment/Bias B

== Artists ==
- Andy Struksha (New South Wales)
- Bias B (Victoria)
- Bliss N Eso (New South Wales)
- Brad Strut (Victoria)
- Chasm (New South Wales)
- Coalition Crew (Queensland)
- Dialectrix (New South Wales)
- DJ Bonez (New South Wales)
- Drapht (Western Australia)
- Downsyde (Western Australia)
- Funkoars (South Australia)
- Gully Platoon (Pegz, Dialectrix and Joe New)
- Hyjak N Torcha (New South Wales)
- Hilltop Hoods (South Australia)
- Illy (Victoria)
- Jase (Victoria)
- Kerser (Campbelltown, New South Wales)
- Mantra (Victoria)
- Matty B (Western Australia)
- Layla (Western Australia)
- Muph & Plutonic (Victoria)
- M-Phazes (Queensland)
- Pegz (Victoria)
- Plutonic Lab (Victoria)
- Reason (Victoria)
- Simplex (Adelaide)
- Skryptcha (New South Wales)
- Spit Syndicate (New South Wales)
- Thundamentals (New South Wales)
- Vents (South Australia)
- 7th Wu (New South Wales)

== Discography ==
| Cat. # | Title | Artist | Year |
|---|---|---|---|
| OBR001 | Solid | Reason | 2000 |
| OBR002 | Culture of Kings: Volume 1 (CD, vinyl) | Various | 2000 |
| OBR003 | Hip Hop Life | Bias B | 2001 |
| OBR004- OBR008 | Culture of Kings: Volume 2 | Various | 2002 |
| OBR009 | The Courageous L.P. | Matty B | 2002 |
| OBR010 | The Authentic LP | Brad Strut | 2002 |
| OBR013 | ObeseCity | Various | 2003 |
| OBR015 | Culture of Kings: Volume 3 | Various | 2003 |
| OBR016 | Drastik Measures | Hyjak N Torcha | 2004 |
| OBR017 | The Calling | Hilltop Hoods | 2003 |
| OBR018 | Andy Social | Andy Struksha | 2003 |
| OBR019 | Flowers in the Pavement | Bliss N Eso | 2004 |
| OBR020 | Pegasus | Pegz | 2001 |
| OBR021 | 12" Apostles | Task Force & Pegasus | 2002 |
| OBR022 | Capricorn Cat | Pegz | 2003 |
| OBR023 | One Step Ahead | Reason | 2004 |
| OBR024 | Hunger Pains | Muph n Plutonic | 2004 |
| OBR025 | Lesfortunate | Downsyde | 2004 |
| OBR026 | When the Dust Settles | Downsyde | 2004 |
| OBR027 | The Fuss About Sluts | Layla) | 2005 |
| OBR028 | Heretik | Layla) | 2005 |
| OBR029 | Bonez Presents The Mamma's Kitchen Mix | DJ Bonez | 2005 |
| OBR030 | More Than Music | Muphin | 2003 |
| OBR031 | For The Ladies | Mr. Trials) | 2005 |
| OBR032 | Who Am I | Drapht | 2005 |
| OBR033 | Aces High | DJ Bonez | 2005 |
| OBR034 | Axis | Pegz | 2005 |
| OBR035 | Nothing But Silence | Grayskul & Debaser | 2005 |
| OBR036 | Back Then | Pegz | 2005 |
| OBR037 | Chechen Gorilla | Pegz | 2005 |
| OBR038 | Heaps Good | Muph & Plutonic | 2005 |
| OBR039 | Codes Over Colours | Plutonic Lab | 2005 |
| OBR040 | The Waiting / Midnight on Pluto | Plutonic Lab | 2005 |
| OBR041 | Clown Prince | Hilltop Hoods | 2006 |
| OBR042 | The Hard Road | Hilltop Hoods | 2006 |
| OBR043 | Life's a Lesson | Reason | 2006 |
| OBR044 | Jase Connection, Beathedz Vol.01 | Jase | 2006 |
| OBR045 | The Greatest Hit | Funkoars | 2006 |
| OBR046 | The Greatest Hits | Funkoars | 2006 |
| OBR047 | The Hard Road (single) | Hilltop Hoods | 2006 |
| OBR048 | Silence the Sirens | Muph & Plutonic | 2006 |
| OBR049 | What a Great Night | Hilltop Hoods | 2007 |
| OBR050 | Been There Done That | Bias B | 2007 |
| OBR051 | The Hard Road: Restrung | Hilltop Hoods | 2007 |
| OBR052 | Hard to Kill | Vents | 2007 |
| OBR053 | Roll Call | DJ Bonez | 2007 |
| OBR054 | Burn City | Pegz | 2007 |
| OBR055 | Don't Let Your Guard Down | Chasm | 2008 |
| OBR056 | Jimmy Recard | Drapht | 2008 |
| OBR057 | Brothers Grimm | Drapht | 2008 |
| OBR058 | Towards the Light | Spit Syndicate | 2008 |
| OBR059 | And Then Tomorrow Came | Muph & Plutonic | 2008 |
| OBR060 | The Tides Are Turning | Reason | 2008 |
| OBR061 | Thundamentals | Thundamentals | 2008 |
| OBR062 | Cycles of Survival | Dialectrix | 2008 |
| OBR063 | Left To Write | Skryptcha | 2009 |
| OBR064 | Known Unknowns | The Coalition Crew | 2009 |
| OBR065 | Long Story Short | Illy | 2009 |
| OBR066 | Unregrettable | Hyjak N Torcha | 2009 |
| OBR067 | The Great Divide | Gully Platoon | 2009 |
| OBR068 | Sleeping on Your Style | Thundamentals | 2009 |
| OBR069 | Move | Chasm & Vida Sunshyne | 2009 |
| OBR070 | Good Gracious | M-Phazes | 2010 |
| OBR071 | Power of the Spoken | Mantra | 2010 |
| OBR072 | Exile | Spit Syndicate | 2010 |
| OBR073 | The Numbers | Skryptcha | 2010 |
| OBR074 | Audio Projectile | Dialectrix | 2010 |
| OBR075 | The Chase | Illy | 2010 |
| OBR076 | Audio Biography | Simplex | 2011 |
| OBR077 | Drama | Pegz | 2011 |
| OBR078 | Phaze One | M-Phazes & Emilio Rojas | 2011 |
| OBR079 | Foreverlution | Thundamentals | 2011 |
| OBR080 | Speaking Volumes | Mantra | 2011 |
| OBR081 | Window of Time | Reason | 2011 |
| OBR082 | This is How We Never Die | Chasm | 2012 |
| OBR083 | Mindful | Skryptcha | 2012 |
| OBR084 | ObeseCity 2 | Various | 2012 |
| OBR085 | Bring It Back | Illy | 2012 |
| OBR086 | Sunday Gentlemen | Spit Syndicate | 2013 |
| OBR087 | Diamond Cuts EP | Chasm | 2013 |
| OBR088 | The Cold Light of Day | Dialectrix | 2013 |
| OBR089 | Smoking Aces EP | Chasm | 2013 |
| OBR090 | The Works | M-Phazes | 2013 |
| OBR091 | Sunday Gentlemen: Deluxe Edition | Spit Syndicate | 2013 |
| OBR092 | Day Turns to Night EP | Chasm | 2013 |
| OBR093 | So We Can Remember | Thundamentals | 2014 |
| OBR094 | Night Vision EP | Chasm | 2014 |

Source: Official Discography

Plethora Records (imprint)
| Cat. # | Title | Artist | Year |
|---|---|---|---|
| PLR001 | Neon Heartache | Jess Harlen | 2010 |
| PLR002 | Park Yard Slang | Jess Harlen | 2012 |

== See also ==
- List of independent record labels
