= Interview with a Madman =

Studio album by Chopper Read
- Released: March 13, 2006
- Recorded: 2005
- Genre: Australian hip hop; gangsta rap; hardcore hip hop
- Length: 65:10
- Label: Rott'n
- Producer: B-Side; Bdon; Nino Brown; Ciecmate; Crooked Eye; Dazastah; DJ Selekt; Jammy; Lazy Grey; Lotek; Necro; Onioncak; Simplex; Weapon X

Professional ratings
Review scores
Source	Rating
eMusic	3/5 stars
Vice	Unfavourable
Tone Deaf	Unfavourable

Interview with a Madman is a hip hop album by Australian criminal Mark "Chopper" Read, released on Rott'n Records on March 13, 2006. Read's foray into music features gritty tales of organised crime, jail time and ear mutilation, and he is supported by beats and guest appearances from Hyjak N Torcha, Justice, Lazy Grey, Lotek, Matty B, Necro, Phrase and various other hip hop artists. Music videos were made for the tracks "Night With Chopper" and "Remember Me".

== Track listing ==
No.	Title	Producer(s)	Length
1.	"Intro"	DJ Selekt, Jammy	1:46
2.	"Played More Gangsters"	Ciecmate	2:54
3.	"See Them at the Pubs (Skit)"		1:06
4.	"Nothing to Us" (featuring Matty B and Ken Oath)	Onioncak	2:56
5.	"The Way They Pop Off"	Simplex	2:31
6.	"Law of the Streets" (featuring Raph A.L.)	Lazy Grey	3:00
7.	"Criminal Resume (Skit)"		2:30
8.	"The Heist" (featuring MC Anecdote and Justice)	B-Side, Nino Brown	2:59
9.	"Message to My Critics (Skit)"		1:10
10.	"Night with Chopper" (featuring Hyjak N Torcha)	Bdon	4:26
11.	"Razors in the Soap (Skit)"		1:44
12.	"Real Life" (featuring Phrase)	Crooked Eye	2:58
13.	"Dedicated to Me Enemies (Skit)"		1:00
14.	"Do It" (featuring Necro)	Necro	3:14
15.	"Remember Me" (featuring Terra Firma)	Simplex	4:47
16.	"Cutting Off Me Ears (Skit)"		1:02
17.	"Bitch Better" (featuring Hunter)	Dazastah	4:03
18.	"Overstand"	Simplex	3:14
19.	"Shot in the Back (Skit)"		0:32
20.	"Burn You Out"	Weapon X	1:31
21.	"Hello Buddy (Skit)"		1:39
22.	"Big Mark" (featuring Sonny Jim and Lotek)	Lotek	3:23
23.	"Hooky the Cripple (Skit)"		0:13
24.	"How Far" (featuring Ethic)	Simplex	3:00
25.	"Joke from Chopper Read (Skit)"		0:31
26.	"Torment"	Lotek	2:09
27.	"Outro"		0:25
28.	"One Last Thing to Say (Skit)"		4:27
Total length:			65:10
