= The Waiters Restaurant =

Italian restaurant in Melbourne, Australia

Coordinates: 37.81207°S 144.97235°E

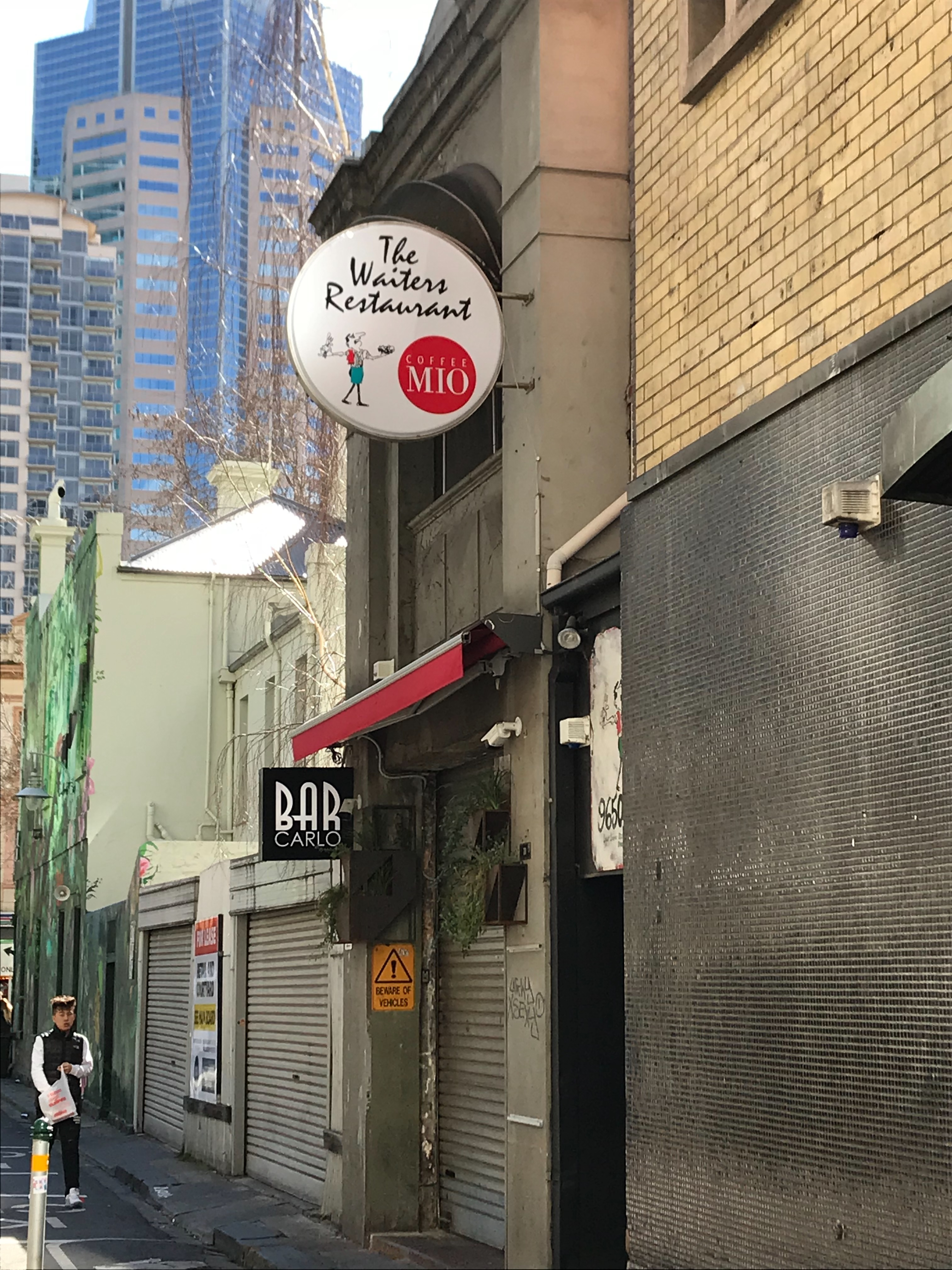
- Interactive map of The Waiters Restaurant

Restaurant information
- Established: 1947
- Owner: Dennis Sabbadini
- Head chef: Ashish Varma
- Food type: Italian
- Location: 20 Meyers Place, Melbourne, 3000, Australia

The Waiter's Restaurant is an Italian restaurant in Melbourne, Australia, described as a "Melbourne institution". Founded in 1947 as the Italian Waiter's Club, it was initially a place for waiters (mainly of Italian and Spanish heritage) to have a meal, a drink, and play cards after their work – in breach of the very strict liquor licensing laws in place at the time. As such, it became popular with other late night workers such as reporters and policemen.

The restaurant is located up a "steep flight of stairs [leading to] a plain white door" suggesting "a no-frills massage parlour rather than a no-frills Italian food joint".

In 1978, the restaurant was the venue of a siege when 19-year-old Amos Atkinson, armed with two shotguns, held 30 people hostage and demanded the release of his associate, Melbourne underworld figure Mark "Chopper" Read. After shots were fired, Atkinson's unimpressed mother was brought to the restaurant by police to act as go-between, still wearing her nightclothes and dressing-gown; she proceeded to hit her son over the head with her handbag and ordered him to "stop being so stupid". Atkinson subsequently surrendered, and was later jailed for five years.
