= Silence the Sirens =

Studio album by Muph & Plutonic
- Released: 21 November 2006
- Recorded: 'Two Rooms on a Budget' / Crookneck Studios
- Genre: Australian hip hop
- Length: 60:14
- Label: Obese
- Producer: Plutonic Lab

Muph & Plutonic chronology
Hunger Pains (2004)	Silence the Sirens (2006)	And Then Tomorrow Came (2008)

Professional ratings
Review scores
Source	Rating
Rapreviews	7.5/10 stars
The Sydney Morning Herald	(not rated)
Sun Herald	7/10 stars
Daily Telegraph	3.5/5 stars

Silence the Sirens is the second album from Muph & Plutonic and was released on 21 November 2006. The album took 10 months to produce and features guest performances from several Australian MCs and Musicians, including Fatlip (The Pharcyde), Pegz, Urthboy (The Herd), Ivens (Awakenings), Raph Boogie & BVA (Mnemonic Ascent) and Red Ghost. It peaked at No. 11 on the ARIA Urban Album Chart and was featured as Triple Js Album of the Week.

== Track listing ==
1. "Intro" – 1:09
2. "Walking Tightropes" – 2:55
3. "Ain't All Over" – 3:36
4. "Leave Your Shoes at the Door" (Featuring Raph & Bva) – 3:47
5. "Comfort Zone" – 4:21
6. "Goin on Tour" (Featuring Urthboy) – 4:24
7. "Voice Box" – 4:13
8. "Colour of Fire" – 4:47
9. "The Day Off" – 3:19
10. "Lost Ones" (Featuring Red Ghost) – 4:12
11. "What You See" (Featuring Ivens) – 3:29
12. "Silence The Sirens" – 3:25
13. "Still Say Sorry Though" – 3:56
14. "Pessimists Like To Party Too!!" (Featuring Fatlip & Pegz) – 3:32
15. "One Side of the Bed" – 3:09
16. "Blinded" – 2:16
17. "Nothing's Alright, Everything's Ok" – 3:47
