= Matty B =

Australian rapper

- Birth name: Matthew Victor Barrett
- Origin: Perth, Australia
- Genres: Hip hop
- Occupation: Singer-songwriter
- Instrument(s): Vocals, acoustic guitar
- Years active: 1999–present
- Labels: Obese; B-Style/Shogun

Matthew Victor Barrett, who performed as Matty B, is a former Australian hip hop rapper and MC. Originally from Perth, he released an album, The Courageous LP, in 2002 on Obese Records. He relocated to the Gold Coast in 2006 and followed with an eight-track extended play, Simple but Effective in May, on his own label, B-Style Entertainment.

== Biography ==
Matthew Barrett grew up in Western Australia and became a member of Perth's Syllabolix Crew. In the 1990s he was a professional surfer, Barrett began rapping seriously when Syllabolix was formed in 1999. He recalled, "I used to just freestyle at parties, take the piss out of people. My mates would tell me I should go rap, since I was about 17."

Formerly signed to Obese Records, he released music on his own label, B-Style Entertainment, in 2006. Barrett's first track to be released was "Courageous", appearing on the Culture of Kings compilation in 2000. It was co-written by Barrett with fellow Syllabolix Crew mate, Scott Griffiths (a.k.a. Optamus).

In 2001 he performed at the Margaret River Masters Concert. In the next year he performed at the Big Day Out concerts. He followed in 2002 by his debut album, The Courageous LP. The album was co-produced by Griffiths and Darren Reutens (a.k.a. Dazastah) of Syllabolix.

Mandy Nolan of Byron Shire Echo felt The Courageous LP was "a must listen release for people who love music coming from the luckiest country in the world; Australia." Beat Magazine's Carlisle Rogers described listening to it as "akin to digging Australia's homegrown version of grime. After all, hip hop's very roots lie in that soil composed of just talking about everyday life, unfiltered, unadulterated." An album track, "Fridays (I Love 'Em)", also appears on Triple J's 2005 album, Super Request—Dog's Breakfast, which is a compilation album of frequently requested songs from that station's Super Request program. "Fridays" was written by Reutens.

Barrett relocated to the Gold Coast and released an eight-track EP, Simple but Effective, in May 2006 on his own label, B-Style Entertainment. He described his song writing style "I used to, when I first started, write rhymes all over the place on bits of paper and then try to match it up with beats later. Now, what I do is get beats from Syllabolix and I listen to the beats first for a few months and I work out the feel of the beats. At the same time I'm dreaming up song titles and subject matter, and things I want to talk about. I match them all up and I start writing over the beat." He performed at the Rosemount Hotel in Perth at an All Stars gig following the Robert Hunter Cup in October 2014, in honour of his late friend Hunter.

== Discography ==
=== Albums ===
- The Courageous LP (2002) – Obese Records (OBR 009)

=== Extended plays ===
- Simple but Effective – B-Style Entertainment/Shogun Distribution (2006)

=== Compilation appearances ===
- Culture of Kings — Volume 1 – Obese Records (2000) (song: "Courageous")
- Mamma's Kitchen – Obese Records (2005) (song: "Courageous")
- Super Request—Dog's Breakfast – ABC Records (2005) (song: "Fridays")

=== Guest appearances ===
- "3 Demon MC's" by Clandestein (Clandestein 2001, Syllaboliks Records)
- "Matty B's Insight" by Downsyde (Epinonimous 2001, Syllaboliks Records)
- "Esposing EM" by Hunter and Dazastah (Done DL 2002, Syllaboliks/Obese Records)
- "Raw Cause" by DJ Ransom (15.OZ Vinyl 2004, Crookneck Records)
- "Nothin to Us" by Chopper Read (Chopper Read – Interview with a Madman 2006, Rott'n Records)
