= Burn City =

Studio album by Pegz
- Released: 15 October 2007
- Genre: Hip hop
- Length: 53:24
- Label: Obese

Pegz chronology
Axis (2005)	Burn City (2007)

Burn City is an album released by Australian hip hop artist MC Pegz on 15 October 2007. This recording features appearances from Australian MCs Drapht, Funkoars, Muph, Vents and others. Californian MC Planet Asia also collaborates on the track "Diligent Music". It peaked at No. 70 on the ARIA Album Chart, No. 10 on the ARIA Urban Album Chart and No. 4 on the ARIA Hitseekers Albums chart. The album's tracks were featured on national radio station, Triple J. According to Khalil Hegarty of The Age declared that Pegz "has made the Australian hip-hop scene his own." During 2008 he toured Australia to promote the album.

== Reception ==
Khalil Hegarty of The Age reviewed Burn City where Pegz "gives his all, but never sounds like he's overdoing it." Hegarty elaborated, that the album is "his acceptance of the glory and a motivational speech for the team that is the local scene." Toby Walker rated it at 7.5/10 and opined that "[he] holds it down tight in his area of expertise, being the rhyme and flow department that he is." Pegz described his album, "my music isn't cryptic... There's a bit of social commentary there and there are some political themes."

== Track listing ==
1. "Know"
2. "Burn City" (featuring Kye)
3. "Milk Bar Star"
4. "Propaganda"
5. "7 Days 6 Nights"
6. "Block to Block (featuring Funkoars)
7. "No Attachments"
8. "Tuxan Factory (Interlude)"
9. "Just Married" (featuring Muph)
10. "I Don't Need Your Judgments" (featuring Reagan Staaf)
11. "Ali Shuffle"
12. "Diligent Music" (featuring Planet Asia and Vents)
13. "Before I Leave" (featuring Drapht, Patto and Illy)
14. "The Fight"
15. "Forsaken"

== Charts ==
Chart performance for Burn City
Chart (2007)	Peak position
Australian Albums (ARIA)	70
