= Hooky the Cripple =

2002 novel by Chopper Read

- Author: Mark "Chopper" Read
- Illustrator: Adam Cullen
- Publisher: Pluto Press Australia
- Publication date: 2002
- ISBN: 978-1-864-03165-2

Hooky the Cripple: The Grim Tale of a Hunchback Who Triumphs is a 2002 novel by Australian writer Mark Brandon 'Chopper' Read, illustrated by Adam Cullen and published by Pluto Press. It was formatted as a book for young readers, but was ruled by some authorities as too violent to be suitable for children.

== Controversy ==
The book received a rather mixed response. While the Queensland government body AccessEd recommended it for secondary schools, a school in Victoria banned it, and likewise the president of the Australian Families Association in Queensland wanted it banned from schools. Read responded, saying "Ban it, just go out and ban it, I am gonna make a fortune if they ban it," believing the publicity from a ban would increase the book's sales.
