= Adam Stephens =

Adam Stephens may refer to:

- A character on Bewitched
- A common misspelling of Adam Stephen, American Revolutionary War general from Virginia
- Adam Stephens, musician in Two Gallants (band)

== See also ==
- Adam Stevens (disambiguation)
