= Dialectrix =

- Also known as: D-Trix
- Born: Ryan Leaf
- Genre: Hip hop
- Occupation: Rapper
- Years active: 2004–present
- Label: Obese Records

Ryan Leaf, better known by his stage name Dialectrix, is an Australian hip hop artist from Sydney. He was a member of Down Under Beats Crew (DUB Crew) and, since 2008, has been a member of Gully Platoon. In addition to his musical career, Dialectrix works in the construction trades. He was introduced to hip hop culture through skateboarding during adolescence.

== Biography ==
=== Solo ===
Dialectrix has released the solo albums Cycles of Survival, Audio Projectile and The Cold Light of Day. The All Aussie Hip Hop site describes Dialectrix's song "Fly On the Wall", from Audio Projectile, as:

. . . a landmark track in the Dialectrix cannon. A bona fide throwback song, Dialectrix raps from the perspective of a fly- observing and judging humanity from an insignificant point of view. The song is in direct parallel to the working man's plight and the feeling of helplessness that comes with being able to see everything, but being powerless to change it.

Dialectrix has supported hip hop artists such as MF Doom. Chris Singh, from The AU Review, described a March 2011 performance:

From spitting multi-syllabic rhymes as fast as legends like Busta Rhymes and Kool G Rap (he even borrowed a beat from the former—'Break Ya Neck') to the more relaxed style of rapping Aussie MC’s are known for, this local rapper sure stamped a firm impression on the sold-out metro. Out of all the Australian rappers I’ve seen live he without-a-doubt stands out as one of the finest artists on the scene.

In mid-August 2013, Dialectrix was a 'First Longlist' finalist for the 9th Coopers AMP for the album The Cold Light of Day, alongside artists such as Kevin Mitchell and The Drones—the Australian music prize is worth A$30,000 and the 2013 winner was announced in March 2014.

=== Collaborations ===
According to Dom Alessio from Triple J's Home & Hosed, an Australian music radio program, Dialectrix "was actually part of the very first hip-hop crew to take out a triple j Unearthed competition, Down Under Beats Crew, back in 2004".

In 2008 Dialectrix contributed a song to Chasm's Beyond The Mix Tape release. Tim McNamara, from Brisbane's Scene Magazine, subsequently described Dialectrix as a red-hot MC. In the same year, Obese Records owner Pegz and Dialectrix formed Gully Platoon, with Joe New and DJ 2Buck. Gully Platoon received high praise, and in 2009, Alessio commented, ". . . perhaps Gully Platoon is Australia's first hip-hop supergroup".

In 2010 Dialectrix contributed a song called "Time Makes Fools of Us All" to Lotek's International Rudeboy album. He also rapped on M-Phazes's ARIA award-winning album Good Gracious, on the song "The Facilitator".

== Awards and nominations ==
=== Australian Music Prize ===
The Australian Music Prize (the AMP) is an annual award of $30,000 given to an Australian band or solo artist in recognition of the merit of an album released during the year of award. The award was commenced in 2005.

Year	Nominee / work	Award	Result
2013	The Cold Light of Day	Australian Music Prize	Nominated

== Discography ==
=== Collaborations ===
- "Superpowers" (ft. Ozi Batla, The Tongue, Jeswon & Dialectrix) on Chasm's Beyond The Mix Tape album (2008)
- "Yes It Is" (ft. Pegz & Dialectrix) on Chasm's Beyond The Mix Tape album (2008)
- "Walking Around Oblivious" (ft. Dialectrix) on Chasm's Beyond The Mix Tape album (2008)
- "Don't Let Your Guard Down" (ft. Dialectrix) on Chasm's Beyond The Mix Tape album (2008)
- "Nature of the Beat" (ft. Dialectrix) on Two Toes' Cooking With Caustics album (2008)
- "Jack N The Box" (ft. Thundamentals & Dialectrix) on Two Toes' Cooking With Caustics album (2008)
- "Broke Pocket Philosophy" (ft. Dialectrix) on Thundamentals' Sleeping on Your Style album (2009)
- "The Facilitator" (ft. Dialectrix) on M-Phazes' Good Gracious album (2010)
- "We Got That" (ft. Dialectrix) on Bigfoot's Giant Steps album (2010)
- "Locked Down" (ft. Dialectrix) on Skryptcha's The Numbers album (2010)
- "The Bust" (ft. Dialectrix) on Bingethinkers Where Are They Now... album (2011)
- "Main Event" (ft. Jise One & Dialectrix) on Fluent Form's Word Merchant album (2011)
- "Priceless" (ft. Dialectrix & Joe New) on Pegz' Drama album (2011)
- "Mad Bastards" (ft. Dialectrix & Joe New) on Pegz' Drama album (2011)
- "Truth" (ft. Dialectrix, Bias B & Joyride) on Reason's Window of Time album (2011)
- "We've Arrived" (ft. Thundamentals, Skryptcha, Scott Burns, Rinse & Dialectrix) on Chasm's This Is How We Never Die album (2012)
- "Life Goes On" (ft. Hau) on Dialectrix's Audio Projectile album (2010)
- "Came For The Sound" (ft. Drapht) on Dialectrix's Cycles of Survival album (2008)

=== Solo ===
- Cycles of Survival – Obese (OBR062) (18 October 2008)
- Audio Projectile – Obese (OBR074) (17 September 2010) ARIA Urban Album No. 15
- Satellite EP – Obese (GRA7-001) (16 February 2013)
- The Cold Light of Day – Obese (OBR-088) (24 May 2013)

=== Gully Platoon ===
- The Great Divide — Obese (OBR067) (8 August 2009)

=== Down Under Beats Crew ===
- Hiphoperation
- Under Raps
