= Purified (rapper) =

- Born: Rowan Meldal-Johnsen; 24 October 1985 (age 40); Durban, South Africa
- Genres: Christian hip hop
- Occupation: Rapper Worship Pastor
- Instruments: Voice, Acoustic Guitar
- Years active: 2008–present

Purified is a Christian hip hop electrohop artist from Durban, South Africa. He is currently living in Sydney, Australia and attends Hillsong Church in Sydney. He has released three studio albums: Don't Hold Back (2009), Set On Fire (2011) and Rebirth (2013). His debut album was the highest selling Christian hip hop Australian album with the follow-up album topping the Australian Christian album sales charts as well.

== Career ==
Purified was born in South Africa and grew up in Durban. At age 13, Purified's family immigrated to Australia settling in Sydney. Purified became a student at Hillsong International Leadership College (HILC), a Christian college where he studied Pastoral Leadership. During his studies and together with a friend, Dave, a rapper, Purified formed a hip hop group named Purified Testimony, in addition to running a hip-hop focused mentoring group for upcoming artists. Purified Testimony developed good following doing weekly rapping shows aimed at youth, in high schools, and at local hip hop events. In 2008, the duo disbanded allowing both members to pursue separate solo careers. taking the name Purified from the band name, he developed as an emerging solo rap artist.

Purified toured internationally in 2009 in the United States, Europe and Australia. He also ministered in 2009 with Hillsong Church in Zimbabwe. Purified worked and toured with several notable Christian hip hop and rock artists such as Tony Stone, JR, Lecrae, Tedashii, Canton Jones, Braille, Sean Slaughter, Everyday Process, K-Drama, Relient K, Switchfoot, Pillar, The Almost, Hillsong United. He has appeared at Australia's most notable Music Festivals Big Exo Day, Groundswell, Blackstump, and Spirit Festival. He has also appeared on Channel 10's morning show The Soup and on the Australian Christian Channel.

He has partnered with Nath Heimberg to form Live Life Loud Crew, a Christian youth movement "to make a difference in this world through the creative arts". He carries a tattoo on his arm that says "Jesus is Lord".

== Discography ==
=== Albums ===
- 2009: Don't Hold Back
- 2011: Set On Fire
- 2013: Rebirth
