= Kat McSnatch =

- Born: Kat McSnatch; 25 April 1987 (age 39); Sydney, New South Wales, Australia
- Genres: Comedy, pop, R&B, blues, folk, soul, hip-hop, rock
- Instruments: Guitar, piano, kazoo
- Years active: 2013–present

Kat McSnatch is an Australian-born songwriter, singer, and comedian. McSnatch's musical comedy is displayed on her first song, "You Are a Cunt", released on YouTube. Soon, Blink 182 adopted it for their 2014 tour of Europe and United Kingdom, playing it as their "intro song" at every live show, including the 2014 Reading Festival, which was broadcast on BBC television. Her social-media presence grew as people joined her accounts on Facebook, YouTube, Twitter, Instagram, and SoundCloud.

Her music is influenced by Bill Hicks, Daft Punk, Blink 182, Rage Against the Machine, Nirvana, Lady Gaga, Lorde, Eva Cassidy, Tori Amos, and Weird Al Yankovic. McSnatch released her debut album, Respectable Member, on 14 November 2014, which features vocal artist Moe Keys, and was produced by Damien Slingsby and mastered by Ryan Smith at Sterling Sound, New York City.

McSnatch provides parody and cover versions, including Bobby McFerrin's song, "Don't Worry Be Happy", as "Don't Worry Be Ugly". She sang vocals on MainFrame - Borderlands: The Pre-Sequel's Claptastic Voyage, produced by Justin Mullins for 2K Games.

== Personal life ==
McSnatch was born in Sydney, Australia. She is of Scottish descent. She grew up in Sydney, eventually relocating to Melbourne. She keeps her personal life private and prefers to let her music and lyrics speak for themselves.
