= Maya Jupiter =

Mexican-Australian singer-songwriter

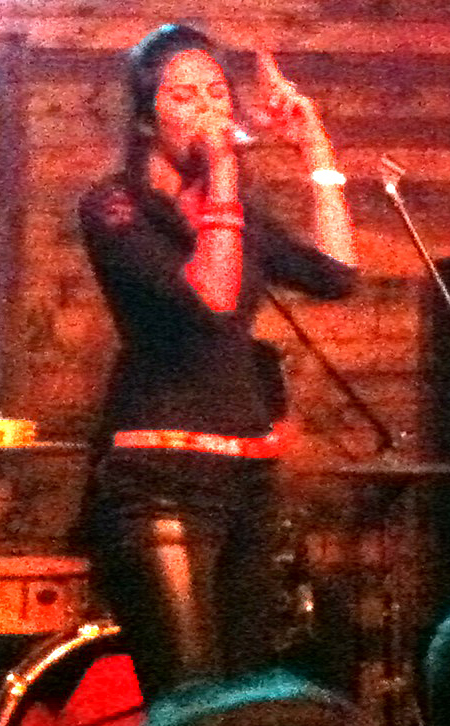
- Maya Jupiter, Orlando, Florida, November 2010

Background information
- Born: Melissha Martinez; 21 December 1978 (age 47); La Paz, Baja California Sur, Mexico
- Origin: Sydney, Australia
- Genres: Hip hop; R&B; salsa
- Occupations: Rapper; musician; songwriter; MC; radio personality
- Instrument: Vocals
- Years active: 1996–present
- Label: Mother Tongues
- Formerly of: Foreign Heights
- Spouse: Aloe Blacc (m. 2010)
- Website: www.mayajupiter.com

Melissha Martinez (born 21 December 1978), better known by her stage name Maya Jupiter, is a Mexican-born Australian rapper, singer, songwriter, actress, MC and radio personality. She released her debut album, Today, in 2003. She was a member of hip-hop group, Foreign Heights, with MC Trey and DJ Nick Toth, which released a self-titled album in 2007. At the ARIA Music Awards of 2007 the trio was nominated for 'Best Urban Release' for "Get Yours (Remix)". From 2004 to 2008, Jupiter hosted the national radio station, Triple J's weekly Hip-Hop Show. Thereafter she pursued her solo career based in Los Angeles and released her second album, Maya Jupiter, in December 2010.

== Biography ==
Maya Jupiter was born as Melissha Martinez on 21 December 1978 in La Paz, Mexico. Her father is Mexican and her mother is Turkish. She has an elder sister, Shiraz Martinez. Her family moved to Melbourne, Victoria when Jupiter was one year old, then relocated to Sydney, when she was four. From four to twelve years old, she grew up in Busby, a suburb in South-western Sydney and then lived in Ashfield. Her parents provided a wide range of musical experience, "At home, we always had different styles of music playing ... [m]y mum used to play classical music, traditional Turkish and pop music, but she was also into jazz and soul. My father used to listen to Spanish-language music". In primary school Jupiter was a school captain, and in secondary school she became a prefect and a sports captain. At the age of 14, she wrote her first rhyme. Her sister took her to local salsa and Latin American clubs. In public Jupiter mostly used English and did not speak much Spanish until she was 17, later she reflected, "I speak more Spanish than I do Turkish! But I was raised by my Mum, so she reminds me that I should be making more Turkish music". At the age of 18, she adopted her stage name using her mother's advice, "to reflect the Mayan side of her heritage" and began performing in an R&B club in Sydney.

In 1998, Jupiter was introduced to the Australian hip hop scene at the Urban Xpressions Festival. One of her early inspirations was Trey, "That was the direction I wanted to go in, and it was nice to have a female role model". From 2001 she started recording tracks "in a piecemeal fashion". She had a minor role in the feature film, Lantana, as a dance instructor. In August 2003 Jupiter released her first album, Today, on Mother Tongues – the first label in the world dedicated to developing women in Hip-Hop music. "Mamacita" was a track dedicated to her mother, "[it] was about the divorce of my parents and I guess it was very personal ... very full on. ... I needed to get out about my father because I didn't see him for about seven years, which I think incited the whole fascination of wanting to know about the Mexican culture". Also that year, she worked with eleven-piece Latin, jazz, hip-hop band, Son Veneno, and accompanied them to The Belligen Global Music Festival. The combination have since performed at numerous festivals including Homebake, Bacardi Festival and supported American singer, Kelis.

By August 2003, Jupiter was also a regular host for shows such as Soul Kitchen and Freestyle on television video outlet, Channel V, and held hip-hop / rap workshops in community centres. She took over as host of national radio station Triple J's weekly music program, Hip Hop Show, in 2004. In 2006, Jupiter joined with fellow rap artist MC Trey and DJ Nick Toth to form the group, Foreign Heights. They released their first single, "It Goes On", featuring Mr Zux in November of that year. In January 2007, their self-titled album was released in Australia and they performed at the Big Day Out. At the ARIA Music Awards of 2007 Foreign Heights was nominated for 'Best Urban Release' for "Get Yours (Remix)".

On 14 April 2008, Hau, frontman of Koolism, took over Jupiter's role as host of the Hip Hop Show, and she left Australia to further her solo career in Los Angeles.

In December 2010, Jupiter released her second album, Maya Jupiter with Panamanian-American singer Aloe Blacc assisting on recording and Quetzal Flores and Martha Gonzalez (both are members of Quetzal) co-producing. OC Weekly's reviewer, Gabriel San Roman described the album as "an innovative collection of songs anchored in lyrical themes of social justice and Son Jarocho vibes" and was pleased by "[t]he sample-free, original instrumentation [which] adds to her music's unique appeal. A Latin American harp, requintos, jaranas, electric guitars, trumpets and keys round out her melodies, and there's a striking use of live percussion instruments such as the quijada, cajón, tarima and pandiero [sic] instead of MPC drum beats".

Jupiter is married to Aloe Blacc. In September 2013, they had their first child, a girl named Mandela. In January 2016, they had their second child, a son.

== Discography ==
=== Albums ===
Solo

- Today – Mother Tongues (August 2003)
- Maya Jupiter (December 2010)
- Never Said Yes (August 2018)

with Foreign Heights

- Foreign Heights – Grindin'/Central Station Records (January 2007)

=== Singles ===
Solo

- "The Artless"/"Ordinary Night" – Mother Tongues (2001)
- "Funny Luck"/"Move" – Mother Tongues (2003)
- "It Goes On" (2006)
