= Foreign Heights =

Australian musical group

- Genres: Hip hop
- Years active: 2006–2008
- Members: Maya Jupiter; MC Trey; Nick Toth

Foreign Heights is an Australian hip hop band made up of Maya Jupiter, MC Trey and Nick Toth. They released their self-titled debut album in January 2007. Their single "Get Yours (Remix)" was nominated for the 2007 ARIA Award for Best Urban Release

== Band members ==
- Maya Jupiter
- MC Trey
- Nick Toth

== Discography ==
- Foreign Heights (2007) - Grindin’/Central Station Records
- "It Goes On" featuring Mr Zux (2006)
- "Get Yours"
