= Stealth Magazine =

Australian hip-hop magazine

Stealth Magazine was an independent hip-hop magazine from Sydney, Australia. Founded by Mark Pollard, it debuted in June 1999 with Arsonists on the cover. Its first three issues were zine-like in format (mostly black and white with a colour cover). In 2000 it went full colour and had a bonus CD attached to it and was quickly picked up for distribution by Tower Records worldwide (mag department now deceased).

The magazine's editorial content mostly focused on the independent hip-hop scenes around the world with the CD including music from Australia, United States, Canada, England, Switzerland and South Korea.

Stealth magazine ended publication in 2007.

== Covers ==
- Issue 1: The Arsonists
- Issue 2: Saafir
- Issue 3: Prince Paul
- Issue 4: Celsius (Australia)
- Issue 5: Esoteric, Boston Feature, Mnemonic Ascent (Australia)
- Issue 6: KRS-One
- Issue 7: De La Soul
- Issue 8: Culture of Kings (Australia)
- Issue 9: Style Wars
- Issue 10: Gangstarr
- Issue 11: DJ Bonez, Hyjak, Torcha (Australia)
- Issue 12: Pete Rock and CL Smooth
- Issue 13: Method Man and Redman
- Issue 14: Def Wish Cast
