= Spit Syndicate =

Australian hip-hop duo

- Origin: Sydney, New South Wales, Australia
- Genre: Hip hop
- Years active: 2005–present
- Labels: Obese, Inertia, One Day Entertainment
- Members: Nick Lupi; Jimmy Nice/Just Enuf
- Website: http://spitsyndicate.com

Spit Syndicate are an ARIA Award-nominated Australian hip hop duo, consisting of Nick Lupi and Jimmy Nice based in Sydney, Australia. The duo have opened for international acts such as Cypress Hill, Xzibit, Ice Cube, Lupe Fiasco, Atmosphere, Brother Ali, People Under The Stairs, Diverse and Savage + Mareko.

The duo are also part of music collective One Day.

== Biography ==
The group was founded in Sydney's Inner West by rappers Nick Lupi and Jimmy Nice. Nick Lupi attended Fort Street High School whilst Jimmy Nice attended Leichhardt High School.

In 2006, Spit Syndicate released their debut mixtape The Future's Bright, which was followed by an appearance on MTV Australia's The Lair in July 2007, alongside other musical acts such as Sparta and The Hot Lies.

In February 2008 the duo signed with Obese Records, when Nice was 21 years of age and Lupi 19, and released their debut album Towards the Light in July 2008.

In a November 2008 interview, Nick Lupi said "We actually signed on the dotted line in February of this year, but we started talking to them in about November of last year. We were both overseas during the summer and we had this album ready and we were gonna put it out when we got back, it was just a matter of who we did it with." In 2013, Nice reflected on their experience of releasing a debut album: "We were so young when we started, we were just little sponges ... We just wanted to know what it was all about, we wanted to be around it, we wanted to be at every gig, we wanted to record at every chance that we got". The album was nominated for ARIA Award for Best Urban Album at the ARIA Music Awards of 2008.

In May 2010, they released their second studio album, Exile. In the official press release, the duo said the album was "inspired by the clarity of mind borne out of travel, the feeling of suffocation by one's everyday surroundings and the displacement sometimes required to get right". Exile's lead single was called "Starry-Eyed" and received prominent airplay on Australia's triple j radio station. Exile debut at number 81 on the ARIA Charts 510 sales.

In 2010, the duo appeared on the song "Long Winding Road" for M-Phazes' debut album, Good Gracious.

In 2011, Spit Syndicate released Best Intentions: Part One, the first of a free online mixtape series and attracted over 10,000 downloads.

In October 2012, the duo released "Beauty in the Bricks", the first single from the third studio album Sunday Gentlemen. The second single, "Folly", was released in January 2013, followed by the release of the album on 22 February 2013. Contributing artists included Drapht, Illy and Solo, and production is accredited to Adit, M-Phazes, J-Skub and Styalz Fuego.

In March 2013, Nice explained the duo's different approach for the recording of the album "The first album that we put out, I don't think it was ever really intended for an audience, a wide audience ... We made that album when we were just out of school and it was just something that we could play at parties ... this time we had a greater sense and an understanding of what we wanted out of the record, so we paid a lot more attention to detail, and had a greater creative control and a bigger say in how the product ended up." Written over two years, the band called the album their "strongest work to date" in 2013. Nice also explained that the duo's creative process had matured over time, while Adit's production work was more experimental. Spit Syndicate completed a national Australian tour in support of the album, from March until May 2013, with support from Sydney artists Jackie Onassis. Sunday Gentlemen debuted at number 15 on the ARIA Charts.

In April 2017, the duo released their fourth studio album, One Good Shirt Had Us All Fly which debuted at number 19 on the ARIA Charts.

In May 2018, the duo released their fifth studio album, Orbit, which debuted at number 61 on the ARIA Charts.

== Discography ==
=== Studio albums ===
List of studio albums, with selected chart positions and certifications
Title	Album details	Peak chart positions
Title	Album details	AUS
Towards the Light	Released: 19 July 2008; Label: Obese (OBR058); Formats: CD, LP, DD	—
Exile	Released: 14 May 2010; Label: Obese (OBR072); Formats: CD, DD	81
Sunday Gentlemen	Released: 22 February 2013; Label: Obese (OBR086); Formats: CD, DD	15
One Good Shirt Had Us All Fly	Released: 14 April 2017; Label: Inertia (IR5251CD); Formats: CD, DD, streaming	19
Orbit	Released: 11 May 2018; Label: One Day Entertainment (ODE002); Formats: CD, DD, streaming	63

=== Mixtapes ===
List of mixtapes
Title	Details
The Future's Bright	Released: June 2006; Label: One Day; Format: CD
Best Intentions Part 1	Released: September 2011; Label: One Day; Format: CD
Best Intentions Part 2	Released: April 2016; Label: One Day, Inertia; Format: CD, DD

=== Singles ===
- "Starry Eyed" – Obese (OBR 072 55) (April 2010)
- "Beauty in the Bricks" – Obese (5 October 2012)
- "Folly" – Obese (25 January 2013)
- "Amazing" – Obese (20 June 2013)
- "Know Better (June 2016)
- "Inhibitions" (November 2016)
- "Emperor's New Flows" (May 2017)
- "Errands" (February 2018)
- "F**k It" (March 2018)
- "Contraband & Conversation" (featuring Imbi the Girl and Kai) (April 2018)

== Awards and nominations ==
=== AIR Awards ===
The Australian Independent Record Awards (commonly known informally as AIR Awards) is an annual awards night to recognise, promote and celebrate the success of Australia's Independent Music sector.

Year	Nominee / work	Award	Result	Ref.
2013	Sunday Gentlemen	Best Independent Hip Hop/Urban Album	Nominated	

=== ARIA Music Awards ===
The ARIA Music Awards is an annual awards ceremony that recognises excellence, innovation, and achievement across all genres of Australian music.

Year	Nominee / work	Award	Result	Ref.
2008	Towards the Light	Best Urban Release	Nominated	
