= Muph & Plutonic =

Australian hip hop group

- Origin: Melbourne, Australia
- Genre: Hip hop
- Years active: 2004–present
- Label: Obese
- Members: Muphin (Dan Young); Plutonic Lab (Leigh Ryan)
- Website: http://www.facebook.com/muphandplutonic

Muph & Plutonic is an Australian hip hop group. It is composed of MC Muphin (Dan Young, also known as "Muph") and DJ–drummer–producer Plutonic Lab (Leigh Ryan), both of whom released several solo albums before joining together to form a combined act in 2004.

== Biography ==
=== Plutonic Lab ===
Leigh Ryan, better known by the stage name Plutonic Lab, began drumming at the age of 10 and performing shows at 14. He released his first solo album in 2001, with others to follow in 2004 and 2005. He has produced beats for many Australian and international artists and performed at a number of festivals.

=== Muphin ===
Dan Young, better known by the stage name Muphin (pronounced as "muffin") or Muph for short, first came to notice by winning the 2001 Victorian Verbal Mechanics Freestyle Battle Competition and since then performing countless live shows.

"I'm kind of an introverted guy, except for my music, that's my one main outlet where I feel comfortable saying whatever I feel. When I get up onstage, after the first few songs it feels like people know me in a way."

His reflective and conscious song writing had its debut release in 2003 with More Than Music. It was during the making of that album that Young forged a musical partnership with Ryan, which resulted in the official forming of their partnership, Muph & Plutonic.

=== Muph & Plutonic ===
Muph & Plutonic released their debut album, Hunger Pains, in November 2004 on Obese Records. Upon release, it was featured as "album of the week" by both radio station Triple J and by SBS radio's Alchemy program, and received favourable reviews. In addition, the single "Heaps Good" received significant airplay on Triple J and community radio, and was included Triple J's 2005 compilation album, Triple J: The Hip Hop Show.

Their second album, Silence the Sirens, was released in October 2006 and similarly received positive reviews.

Throughout 2007 and 2008 Muph & Plutonic extensively toured taking in a number of Australia's music festivals including Big Day Out, Falls Festival, Golden Plains, Kiss My Grass, Pyramid Rock and Triple J's 'AWOL' Karratha gig, alongside Powderfinger and The Grates. The Obese Block Party in May 2008 saw the introduction of DJ Bonez as the new Muph & Plutonic DJ, The Original DJ for Muph & Plutonic was DJ FX.

Their third album, And Then Tomorrow Came, released on 19 July 2008, was selected as the "Album of the Week" on Triple J for the week of 21–25 July. The album reached 46 on the Australian charts and was nominated for an ARIA Award in for Best Urban Release. Following the release of the album, Muph & Plutonic, with DJ Bonez, undertook a national tour throughout August, September and October 2008.

In 2010, Muph & Plutonic appeared with Candice Monique on the track "Goodbye Gravity" on M-Phazes' album Good Gracious.

=== Milk Bar Stars ===
Muph and Plutonic Lab also toured nationally in 2005, together with DJ Bonez and Obese Records boss Pegz, under the collective name Milk Bar Stars.

== Discography ==
=== Albums ===
Album title	Release date	Peak chart positions	Label	Format
Album title	Release date	AUS	Label	Format
Hunger Pains	November 2004	—	Obese	CD
Silence the Sirens	October 2006	—	Obese	CD/vinyl
The Day Off	October 2006	—	Obese	CD/vinyl
And Then Tomorrow Came	July 2008	46	Obese	CD/vinyl

=== Solo albums ===
==== Plutonic Lab ====
Album title	Release date	Label	Format
Give Me Sabotage Shell	2001	Nuffsaid	CD/vinyl
Collision of Days	2004	Nuffsaid	CD/vinyl
Codes Over Colours	2005	Obese	CD/vinyl
Midnight on Pluto Remix EP	2006	Obese	Vinyl

==== Muphin ====
Album title	Release date	Label	Format
Who I Am	1999	Puah Head Constructions	
More Than Music (EP)	2003	Obese	Vinyl
More Than Music	2003	Obese	CD
With A Grain Of Salt	2019	Self	Digital

== Awards and nominations ==
=== AIR Awards ===
The Australian Independent Record Awards (commonly known informally as AIR Awards) is an annual awards night to recognise, promote and celebrate the success of Australia's Independent Music sector.

Year	Nominee / work	Award	Result
2007	Muph & Plutonic	Most Oustsanding New Independent Artist	Nominated
2008	And Then Tomorrow Came	Best Independent Hip Hop Album	Nominated
