= Phinesse =

Dave Devine, known by his stage name Phinesse, is an urban music artist based in Melbourne, Australia. Formally a duo, on 1 November 2010 Phinesse became a solo act.

He landed the national support for hip-hop superstar 50 Cent on his 2008 tour including a show in Auckland.

He has also toured with international superstars T-Pain and Ne-Yo on the Winterbeatz 2010 tour and with Akon on the Australian Konvict Music tour.

He recently performed some songs from his new album 'Reborn' at Rod Laver Arena on the Winterbeatz 2011 tour.

He is signed to Melbourne-based management company TOTW. In early 2013 he signed with management company Prince Entertainment.

As of 2014 he has decided to take a break from music indefinitely with both its website and management company no longer accessible.

== Discography ==
List of charted singles, with selected chart positions
Title	Year	Peak chart positions
Title	Year	AUS Phy.
"I Can't Wait"	2007	48
