= ...And Then Tomorrow Came =

Studio album by Muph & Plutonic
- Released: 19 July 2008
- Genre: Australian hip hop
- Length: 49:34
- Label: Obese Records
- Producer: Plutonic Lab

Muph & Plutonic chronology
Silence the Sirens (2004)	...And Then Tomorrow Came (2008)

...And Then Tomorrow Came is the third album from Muph & Plutonic and was released in July 2008.

It was listed as Triple J's feature album for the week of its release.

The album was also nominated for 'Best Urban Release' at the 2008 ARIA awards.

== Track listing ==
1. "The Damn Truth" - 2:54
2. "Balloon Heads" (feat Kye) - 3:39
3. "Number 45" - 3:39
4. "Yesterday's Basement" - 4:14
5. "Beautiful Ugly" (feat Jess Harlen) - 4:14
6. "Sleep" - 3:34
7. "Show Me Your Face" - 3:08
8. "Filthy Rich" (feat Paul Williamson) - 3:27
9. "And Then Tomorrow Came" (feat Pete Lawler) - 3:59
10. "Today" (feat Raph Boogie, Eligh, The Grouch and The Tongue) - 5:24
11. "Size of the Soul" - 3:42
12. "Wrong" - 3:32
13. "Don't Worry About Nothin'" (feat Jess Harlen) - 4:00

== Charts ==
Chart performance for And Then Tomorrow Came
Chart (2008)	Peak position
Australian Albums (ARIA)	46
