= Gully Platoon =

Australian musical group

- Origin: Melbourne, Victoria, Australia
- Genres: Hip-hop
- Years active: 2008–2011
- Label: Obese Records
- Members: Pegz; Joe New; Dialectrix
- Website: MySpace site

Gully Platoon were an Australian hip-hop group, composed of Pegz (Tirren Staaf) with Joe New (Joseph Newberry) and Dialectrix (Ryan Leaf).

== History ==
Tirren Staaf, who is also the CEO of Obese Records, founded the group in 2008.

I've always wanted to have a group for quite a long time now. It's been on the plate for as long as I can remember. I've always wanted to make a group record. I really wanted a different creative process, I wanted to share the writing and really bounce ideas off other people.

— Tirren Staaf

He realised his ambitions when Ryan Leaf (originally from the Blue Mountains) came to Melbourne to record the video of his song "Outcast".

After I left Down Under Beats it was always my plan to do a solo endeavour but at the same time [I wanted to] keep my crew-based roots and get on board with a few other like-minded hip hop heads.

— Ryan Leaf

Soon after Joseph Newbury also from Down Under Beats, the first Australian hip hop group to win Triple J's Unearthed competition, joined the duo.

Signed to Obese Records, they released their debut album, The Great Divide, in 2009. The album was the culmination of six months of work from Staaf, Leaf and Newbury who did all the writing, and the production and mixing talents of J Squared, Plutonic Lab and J Smith & Dutchman, as well as vocal help from Kel Timmons, Cisco Tavares and Kulaia. The Great Divide reached #18 on the ARIA Top 40 Urban Album charts. The first single to be lifted from the album is "Nothing to Lose", with the song, "Coat Of Paint", also being placed on national rotation on Triple J. The background to the album's title, according to Staaf "represents being in an Australian landscape and musically and artistically trying new things. It represents creatively trying to do something different, to step away from the stereotypes."

== Discography ==
=== Albums ===
- The Great Divide — Obese (OBR057) (8 August 2009)

=== Singles ===
- "Nothing to Lose" — Obese (2009)
