= MC Trey =

- Birth name: Thelma Thomas
- Also known as: MC Trey
- Born: Suva, Fiji
- Origin: Australia
- Genres: Hip hop
- Occupations: Singer; rapper
- Labels: Tapastry
- Member of: Foreign Heights

Thema Thomas, known professionally as MC Trey, is a Fijian singer and rapper. She was nominated as one of Sydney's Top 10 Creative Innovators in the field of music and is a member of ARIA-nominated band Foreign Heights.

== Career ==
She, Maya Jupiter (Channel V) and DJ Nick Toth form the hip-hop trio, Foreign Heights. The second single off their self titled 2007 album, "Get Yours", was nominated for an ARIA award in 2007.

Her nominations include 'ARIA, Urban Music, 3D and Jack Music Awards. She has been a creative producer in Pacific community projects, youth arts work and facilitating hip-hop music workshops for young people around Australia for over 10 years. Her work in this area was awarded a Vodafone Australia Foundation "World of Difference" grant, enabling her to co-ordinate music programs for marginalised young people at Information and Cultural Exchange (ICE) and Street University in Western Sydney. These programs aim to further-develop participant's writing, communication and performance skills and encourage young people to tell their stories through hip-hop music.

== Discography ==
- 'Getaway feat. Savuto - Single (Tapastry): 2019
- 'Daily - Single (Tapastry): 2017
- 'The Light - Single (Tapastry): 2013
- Foreign Heights - CD (Grindin’/Central Station Records): '07
- Tapastry Tunes - CD (Tapastry Toons/Shock Records): '03
- Creepin' - CD/vinyl single (tv1/Sony Music) with Fatt Dex: '01
- Daily Affirmations - CD (Tapastry Toons/Mother Tongues): '00
- Universal Soldier - 12" (Tapastry Toons/Mother Tongues): '99
- Projectiles - US tour tape (Tapastry Toons): '98
- Projectiles - demo CD & Tape (Tapastry Toons) w/DJ Bonez: '96/'97
