= Wayne "Lotek" Bennett =

British musician (born 1977)

Lotek
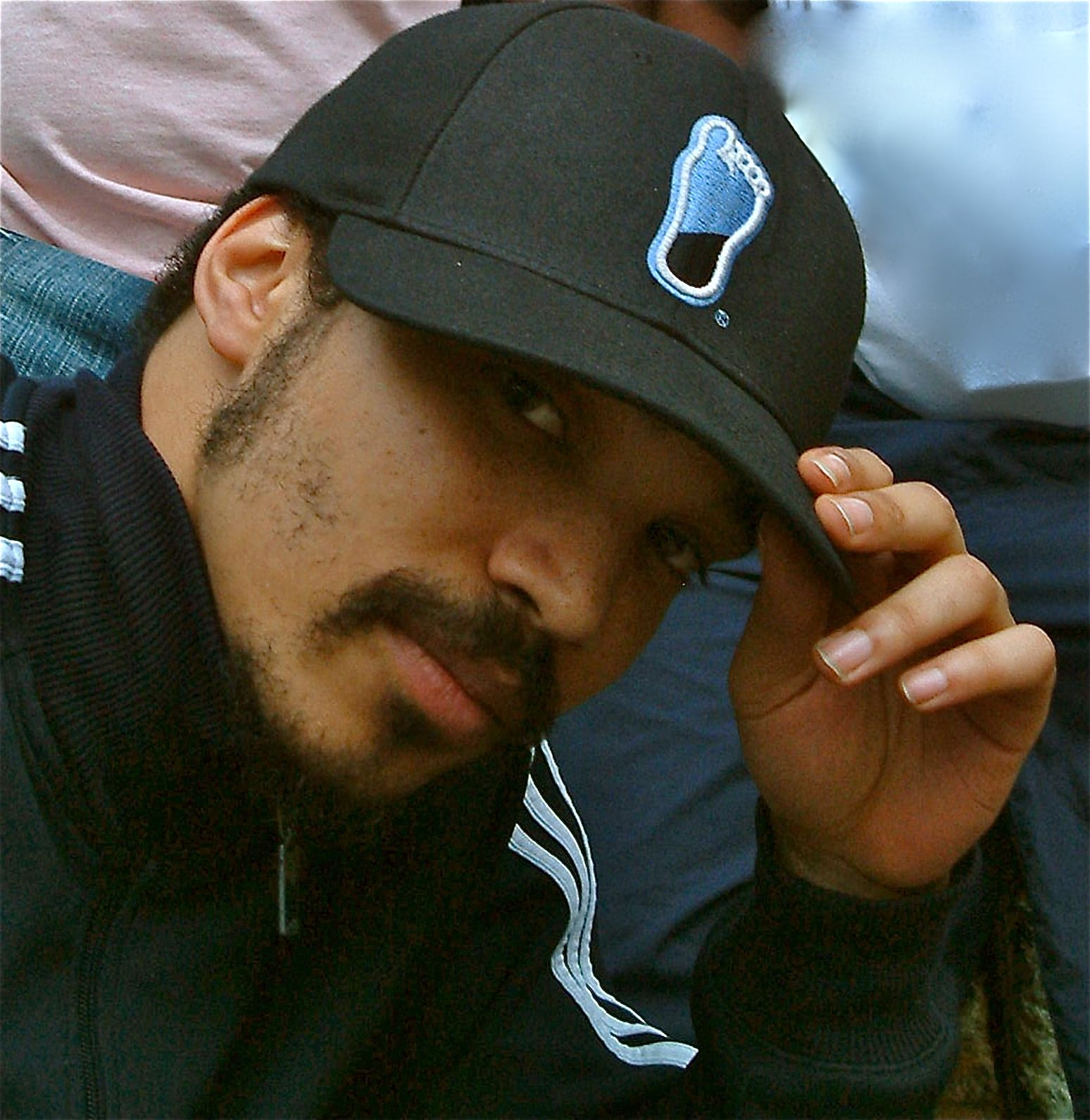
- Wayne Lotek of Lotek Hifi c. 2010

Background information
- Born: Wayne Bennett; 1977 (age 48–49)
- Origin: London, England
- Genres: Hip Hop; reggae; dub; ska; dancehall
- Occupations: Vocalist; songwriter; rapper; record producer; mixing engineer; mastering engineer
- Years active: 1995–present
- Labels: Counter Clockwise; First Word; Big Dada
- Website: waynelotek.com

Wayne "Lotek" Bennett (born 1977 in Gosport, England) is a music producer, songwriter and rapper from the UK. He is most famous for his work with Roots Manuva and more recently with Speech Debelle, producing her debut album Speech Therapy which won the 2009 Mercury Prize.

In 2005, Lotek won the BBC Performing Arts Fund's Urban Music Award and was quoted as saying, "with the Performing Arts Fund money I bought a laptop, microphone and a compact mixer. After flying around Eastern Europe recording with artists from Poland, Russia and Hungary I returned briefly to London before flying to Australia (the flight down under was also funded by the award)". He was based in Melbourne, Australia for 10 years, during that time Speech Therapy was recorded.

One of his other projects is the dub, reggae and hip-hop group Lotek Hi-Fi, who are currently signed to the Big Dada label.

In late 2010, Lotek's debut solo record International Rudeboy was released. Completed in Collingwood, Melbourne (Australia) at Counter Clockwise Studios, it features many local and international guests including Roots Manuva, Jimmy Screech, Ricky Ranking, RuC.L, Ozi Batla, Dialectrix and Ciecmate. The critically acclaimed album mixes hip-hop, reggae, ska and dancehall styles.

Lotek appears as a guest vocalist on the song, "Living in Bunkers", track 5 of Hilltop Hoods's album, Drinking from the Sun. The song also features Black Thought of American hip hop group, The Roots.
