= Mark "Chopper" Read =

Australian criminal (1954–2013)

Mark Read
- Born: Mark Brandon Read; 17 November 1954; Melbourne, Victoria, Australia
- Died: 9 October 2013 (aged 58); Parkville, Victoria, Australia
- Other name: Chopper Read
- Occupations: Criminal, author
- Spouses: Mary-Ann Hodge (m. 1995; div. 2001) Margaret Cassar (m. 2003)
- Children: 2
- Convictions: Armed robbery; Assault; Kidnapping

Mark Brandon "Chopper" Read (17 November 1954 – 9 October 2013) was an Australian convicted criminal, gang member and author. Read wrote a series of semi-autobiographical fictional crime novels and children's books. The 2000 film Chopper is based on his life.

== Early life ==
Read was born on 17 November 1954 to Keith Read, an army and World War II veteran of Irish descent, and a mother who was a devout Seventh-day Adventist. He grew up in the Melbourne suburbs of Collingwood and Fitzroy. Read was bullied at school; he said that by the age of 15 he had been on the "losing end of several hundred fights" and that his father, usually on his mother's recommendation, beat him often. Read was also molested as a child. He was made a ward of the state by the age of 14, and was placed in several mental institutions as a teenager; he stated that he underwent electroshock therapy there.

== Criminal activity ==
When he was still young, Read was already an accomplished street fighter and the leader of the Surrey Road gang, which had a reputation for violence. He began his criminal career by robbing drug dealers based in massage parlours in the Prahran area. He later graduated to kidnapping and torturing members of the criminal underworld, often using a blowtorch or bolt cutters to remove the toes of his victims as an incentive for them to produce enough money so that Read would leave them alive.

Read spent only 13 months outside prison between the ages of 20 and 38, having been convicted of crimes including armed robbery, firearm offences, assault, arson, impersonating a police officer and kidnapping. While in Pentridge Prison's H division in the late 1970s, Read launched a prison war with Jimmy Loughnan. "The Overcoat Gang" wore long coats all year round to conceal their weapons, and they were involved in several hundred acts of violence against a larger gang during this period. Around this time, Read had a fellow inmate cut both of his ears off to be able to leave H division temporarily. In his biography, Read claimed this was to avoid an ambush by other inmates by being transferred to the mental health wing. His later works state that he did so to "win a bet". The nickname "Chopper" was given to him long before this, from a cartoon character during his childhood named Chopper who was a dog featured in Yakky Doodle.

In 1978, while Read was incarcerated, his associate Amos Atkinson held 30 people hostage at The Waiters Restaurant in Melbourne while demanding Read's release. After shots were fired, the siege was lifted when Atkinson's mother, in her dressing gown, arrived at the restaurant to act as go-between. Atkinson's mother hit him over the head with her handbag and told him to "stop being so stupid". Atkinson then surrendered.

In 1978, Read attempted to kidnap County Court judge Bill Martin in an attempt to secure the release of Read's friend James "Jimmy" Loughnan from prison. Read was subsequently sentenced to 13 years in prison Read was later stabbed by members of the Overcoat Gang, including Loughnan, in prison, in order to prevent his plan to cripple every other inmate in the division. To avoid retribution for this plan Read spread the theory that his friends wished to benefit from a contract put on Read's head by the Painters' and Dockers' Union. Read lost several feet of intestine in the attack. Loughnan later died in the Jika Jika fire at Pentridge in 1987.

In the TV series Tough Nuts, Read also spoke of his mid-1980s to early 1990s rivalry with Alphonse Gangitano. Read explained that he had a disagreement with Gangitano regarding an elderly neighbourhood hero, whom Gangitano admired. It is alleged by Read that Gangitano burst open a toilet cubicle door with a number of associates and began a serious assault on Read, who made his escape but not before smearing his faeces into Gangitano's face.

In 1992, Read was convicted of shooting Sidney Michael Edward Collins in the chest. The incident took place in Read's car, which was in the driveway of Collins' residence at Evandale, Tasmania. The bullet was recovered from the back seat of the vehicle and Collins named Read as the shooter. Pleading not guilty, Read was convicted of committing an unlawful act intended to cause bodily harm, a downgraded charge from attempted murder and sentenced as a "dangerous criminal" to indefinite detention.

An appeal against the conviction was rejected by the Court of Criminal Appeal on 24 August 1993. A second appeal against the sentence was argued on 28 February 1994, with Michael Hodgman and Anita Betts appearing for Read and Tasmanian Director of Public Prosecutions, Damian Bugg, QC and Catherine Geason appearing for the Crown, on the grounds that it was manifestly excessive and also specifically in respect of the "dangerous criminal" declaration. The second appeal was rejected on 10 March 1994. In a subsequent review of the "dangerous criminal" declaration on 18 July 1997, Hodgman succeeded in overturning the declaration.

Read was granted parole early in 1998 and regained his freedom. In 2002, Read was again questioned over the disappearance of Sidney Collins, who is still on the Australian Missing Person list after going missing in suspicious circumstances. Before his death, Read admitted to having murdered Collins in his last broadcast interview on the 60 Minutes program aired on 20 October 2013. Read expressed no remorse for killing Collins, alleging he was "stupid" for allowing Read to shoot him on two occasions with his own gun.

In the 60 Minutes interview, he also discussed the 1971 shooting of union boss Desmond Costello, the 1974 'suicide' of child sex offender Reginald Isaacs and the 1987 shooting of Siam Ozerkam (Sammy the Turk). Read variously claimed to have been involved in the killing of 19 people and the attempted murder of 11 others. In 1998, he turned up drunk on a live television show hosted by Elle McFeast and, to the outrage of many viewers, "gave a colourful account of feeding a man into a cement mixer". In an April 2013 interview with the New York Times, Read said "Look, honestly, I haven't killed that many people, probably about four or seven, depending on how you look at it".

== Other activities ==
In 2001, Read was featured in an advertisement on behalf of the Pedestrian Council of Australia warning of the dangers of drunk driving.

In 2005, Read embarked on a tour of Australia performing a series of shows titled I'm Innocent with Mark "Jacko" Jackson (Read's manager) and later toured Sydney in a stage show with a new co-star, former detective Roger "The Dodger" Rogerson and throughout Australia with comedian and friend Doug Chappel. Read even made regular guest appearance on Doug Chappel's Melbourne International Comedy Festival show in 2008 called 'Comics Live in your Lounge' where the two of them told stories on stage together.

In 2006, Read appeared in another commercial speaking out against domestic violence. On 13 March 2006, he released a rap album titled Interview with a Madman. He also appeared in the 2002 Australian comedy Trojan Warrior. Read, persuaded by Andrew Roper, his manager, allowed use of his name to a wine, "Chopper Red" and later to a beer called "Chopper Heavy". The beer is produced in Rutherglen, Victoria, a town associated with Australia's most notorious outlaw, Ned Kelly. In 2007, despite his apparent successes, he was forced to declare bankruptcy, which included an $80,000 credit card debt and $140,000 in private loans to 12 people. Roper was later replaced by Andrew Parisi as manager.

Read made the headlines again, on 15 December 2008, after being questioned by police about an alleged incident in Johnson Street, Collingwood. Read was attacked by a tomahawk-wielding man he said he had never met before. He said: "I ran to the panelbeater's and grabbed a pipe. I said, 'Come here now' and he jumped into a car and pissed off." Read suffered a minor injury to his arm after being hit with the blunt end of the tomahawk. Read was questioned by detectives at Richmond police station before being released without charge. His alleged attacker has not been found.

=== Author ===
Read was an author of crime novels, selling more than 500,000 copies of his works. His first book, Chopper: From the Inside, was collected from letters he sent while incarcerated in Melbourne's Pentridge Prison and published in 1991. It contains tales and anecdotes of his criminal and prison exploits. Further biographical releases followed in a similar vein. With the advent of Chopper 5: Pulp Faction, Read began writing fictional tales based on his experiences of criminal life. Attempts were made to ban a children's book written by Read titled Hooky the Cripple. In later years he made recordings of voice narratives which also sold well.

== Cultural references ==
A fictionalised version of Read was featured in several sketches on The Ronnie Johns Half Hour. In some of these sketches, such as "Harden The Fuck Up!", Read was portrayed by Heath Franklin. Read said that although the parody was not totally accurate, he found it funny.

Science fiction author William Gibson based a character (Keith Blackwell) in the final two books of his Bridge trilogy on Read. In the second book of the trilogy, Idoru, Gibson wrote in his acknowledgments:

Anything I know about the toecutting business, I owe to the criminal memoirs of Mark Brandon "Chopper" Read (Chopper from the inside, Sly Ink, Australia, 1991). Mr. Read is a great deal scarier than Blackwell, and has even fewer ears.

Chopper featured on hip hop songs and released a rap album in 2006 titled Interview with a Madman. It was panned by critics.

=== Film ===
The 2000 film Chopper, starring Eric Bana as Read, was based on the heavily fictionalised stories from Read's books and independent research, leading to events portrayed on screen that somewhat contradicted Read's version. For instance, Read claimed in early books to be vehemently against drugs, but the film portrays him as a casual drug user. In response, Read stated, "You have to have tried something to be able to say you hate it." The representation of Jimmy Loughnan in the film has been discredited.

=== Underbelly ===
Read was featured twice in the Australian true-crime series Underbelly. He first appeared in the fifth episode of the show's second series, Underbelly: A Tale of Two Cities, where he was played by Renato Fabretti. Read later appeared as the lead character in the show's seventh season, Underbelly Files: Chopper. The two-part miniseries focused on Read's attempts at going straight after his stint in Pentridge Prison, as well as the beginning of his writing career and his feud with Syd Collins and underworld figure Alphonse Gangitano. The cast featured Aaron Jeffery as Read, Vince Colosimo as Alphonse Gangitano, Michael Caton as Read's father Keith, Todd Lasance as Syd Collins, Zoe Ventoura as Read's first wife Mary-Ann Hodge, and Ella Scott Lynch as Read's lifelong friend and eventual second-wife Margaret Cassar.

== Personal life ==
Read married Australian Taxation Office employee Mary-Ann Hodge in 1995 while imprisoned in Risdon Prison in Tasmania for the shooting of Sydney Collins. They had one son, and divorced in 2001. On 19 January 2003, he married long-time friend Margaret Cassar, and they had one son.

=== Health issues and death ===
Read contracted hepatitis C during his time in prison, possibly as a result of using shared razor-blades. In March 2008, he revealed that he only had two to five years to live and required a liver-transplant. However, he refused to agree to the procedure, stating that while a transplant would save him, he did not want one when an organ could be provided to someone else. In April 2012, he was diagnosed with liver-cancer. He underwent surgery in July 2012 to remove tumours from his liver, and in late September 2013, he was admitted to Melbourne Private Hospital in failing health. He died of the illness on 9 October 2013, aged 58, in Parkville, Victoria, at Royal Melbourne Hospital.

== Bibliography ==
- Chopper: From the Inside (1991), ISBN 0-646-06543-2
- Chopper 2: Hits and Memories (1992), ISBN 0-646-10987-1
- Chopper 3: How to Shoot Friends & Influence People (1993), ISBN 0-646-15444-3
- Chopper 4: For the Term of His Unnatural Life (1994), ISBN 0-646-21014-9
- Chopper 5: Pulp Faction: Revenge of the Rabbit Kisser and Other Jailhouse Stories (1995), ISBN 0-646-25065-5
- Chopper 6: No Tears for a Tough Guy (1996), ISBN 0-646-29637-X
- Chopper 7: The Singing Defective (1997), ISBN 0-646-33923-0
- Chopper 8: The Sicilian Defence (1998), ISBN 0-9586071-0-9
- Chopper 9: The Final Cut (1999), ISBN 0-9586071-4-1
- Chopper 10^{1}/_{2}: The Popcorn Gangster (2001), ISBN 0-9579121-0-2
- Hooky the Cripple: The Grim Tale of a Hunchback Who Triumphs (2002), ISBN 1-86403-165-4
- The Adventures of Rumsley Rumsfelt (2003), ISBN 0-9579121-7-X
- Chopper 11: Last Man Standing: From Ex-Con to Icon (2007)
- Mark 'Chopper' Read: One Thing Led To Another (2010), ISBN 978-1-4050-4046-4
- Mark 'Chopper' Read: Road to Nowhere (2011), ISBN 9781742611457

== Discography ==
- Interview with a Madman (2006)
- The Smell of Love E.P. – Chopper Read and The Blue Flames (1997) Newmarket Records (Catalog New 3003.2)
