= Bias B =

- Born: Adam Stevens; 1974 (age 51–52); Melbourne, Victoria, Australia
- Genre: Australian Hip Hop
- Occupation: Rapper
- Label: Wordburner Entertainment/Obese Records

Adam Stevens, better known by the stage name Bias B, is an Australian hip hop artist. He started writing lyrics in 1989 and began performing in 1991 and released his first album, Beezwax, in 1998. The album took two years to sell its first 500 copies. In 1999, Bias B released an album called Boney & Stoney along with fellow crew members Len One and Lazy Grey. His third album in 2007 sold out its first 3000 copies in less than two weeks. Bias B worked at Obese Records and hosted two radio shows with Stewbakka on PBS FM (The Formula) & RRR-FM (Wordburner).

== Stage name ==
Bias B described to the Cairns Post the origin of his stage name:

"The name 'Bias' didn't come from prejudicial attitudes, it came from the frequency on a cassette tape. Bias is the inaudible, high-frequency tone mixed with the input signal that passes through the recording head to excite tape particles, preparing it to record effectively."

== Discography ==
=== Bias B ===
- Beezwax - Wild Child Productions (1998)
- Hip Hop Life EP - Obese Records (2001)
- In Bed With Bias - Wordburner (2003)
- Been There, Done That - Obese Records (2007)
- Beemixes - Wordburner Entertainment (2007)
- Aerosol Era - Wordburner Entertainment (2009)
- Baccapellas - Wordburner Entertainment (2010)
- Biaslife - Wordburner Entertainment (2011)
- Back Burners - Wordburner Entertainment (2018)
- “Above and Beyond” - Blyth St Records (2021)
- “Behemoth” - 2022 Bias B (2022)
- “Biasphere” (2023)

=== Boney & Stoney ===
- Boney & Stoney - Wild Child Productions/Blackstump (1999)
