= Pegz =

- Also known as: Pegasus
- Born: Tirren Staaf; 23 December 1975 (age 50); Melbourne, Victoria, Australia
- Genre: Hip-hop
- Occupations: Rapper, producer, record executive
- Years active: 1992–2018
- Label: Obese

Tirren Staaf (born 23 December 1975), known professionally as Pegz (short for Pegasus), is an Australian hip hop artist and producer hailing from Melbourne, Victoria. From 2002 until 2016 he was the CEO of Obese Records —the record label responsible for some of the country's most successful rap artists, such as Hilltop Hoods, Kerser, and Illy.

== Biography ==
Tirren Staaf was named after Tiran Porter, former member of the Doobie Brothers.

Pegz has been involved with the Australian hip hop scene since 1992. As a teenager, he was first a graffiti artist before becoming a rapper.

In 2000, he got a job at Obese Records, a specialist hip-hop music store in Prahran. He released his first recording, a self-titled EP, Pegasus, through Obese's distribution label in 2001, followed by a studio album, Capricorn Cat, in 2003, and Axis in 2005.

In 2005, Pegz toured nationally with Australian Hip Hop Milk Bar Stars (Pegz, Muph, DJ Bonez and Plutonic Lab). Upon releasing his third solo album, Burn City, in 2007, Pegz briefly retired as a solo artist to concentrate on managing Obese Records, stating:

"This will be my last solo effort I think; I'm not in the mental space to be juggling everything right now, but we'll see what happens. I'm always writing. Always."

In 2009, Pegz returned with a new group, Gully Platoon, composed of him and MCs Dialectrix and Joe New. Together, they only released one album in 2009, The Great Divide. The album reached #5 on the AIR Top 20 Album charts and #18 on the ARIA Top 40 Urban Album charts. The group released their first video clip for the single "Nothing To Lose" on 15 September 2009.

On 26 January 2011, Obese Records announced that Pegz would be releasing another solo album, Drama, which released a few months later in April 2011.

On May 7 2016, Pegz closed the Obese Records label and store. On 5 October 2018 he released the album Equilibrium, a collaborative effort between him and producer Silent Titan, on Hydrofunk Records. The album peaked at #5 on the AIR Top 20 Album charts and #18 on the ARIA Top 40 Urban Album charts.

== Discography ==
=== Albums ===
List of albums, with selected details and chart positions
Title	Details	Peak chart positions
Title	Details	AUS
Capricorn Cat	Released: 2003; Label: Obese (OBR022); Format: CD	—
Axis	Released: 2005; Label: Obese (OBR034); Format: CD	—
Burn City	Released: 2007; Label: Obese (OBR054); Format: CD, digital	70
Drama	Released: 2011; Label: Obese (OBR077); Format: CD, digital	52
Equilibrium (with Silent Titan)	Released: 2018; Label: Hydrofunk Records; Format: Digital	18 (ARIA Urban Album Chart)

=== EPs ===
- Pegasus (2001) – Obese (OBR020)

=== Singles ===
- "Celebrate Daily"/"Rogue"/"Everyshow" (2001)
- "12 Apostles" (2002) – Obese (OBR021)
- "Back Then" (2005) – Obese (OBR036)
- "Chechen Gorilla" (2005) – Obese (OBR037)
- "No Attachments" - Obese (2008)
- "Burn City" - Obese (2008)
- "Equilibrium" (feat. Jace XL) - Hydrofunk (2018)
- "Lonely" - Independent (2023)
