= Delirium (music promoter) =

Perth-based electronic music promoter

- Company type: Private
- Industry: Music promotion
- Genre: Electronic dance music
- Founded: c. 1996
- Founder: Jeremy Junk
- Defunct: 2013.
- Fate: Ceased operations following the death of its founder
- Headquarters: Perth, Western Australia, Australia
- Key people: Jeremy Junk
- Products: Music festivals, club nights, rave events
- Website: web.archive.org/web/20050408060008/http://www.delirium.com.au/

Delirium was a prominent electronic music promotion company based in Perth, Western Australia, active from the mid-1990s through the late 2000s. Founded by DJ and RTRFM broadcaster Jeremy Junk (known professionally as Mr Whippy or MRW), the organization was a central figure in the transition of Western Australia's electronic dance music scene from underground warehouse parties to large-scale, sanctioned festivals.

The company is noted for professionalizing the local rave culture by collaborating with statutory bodies to secure licensing for major events in non-traditional venues, such as Scitech and the Perth Entertainment Centre. Delirium frequently partnered with national promoters including Future Entertainment and local entities such as Loaded Dice to stage major festival tours like Two Tribes and Summadayze. Following the death of its founder in 2013, Junk was posthumously inducted into the Perth Dance Music Awards Hall of Fame for his contributions to the industry.

== History ==
Delirium was established during the mid-1990s at a time when Perth's electronic music scene was largely underground. Under the leadership of Jeremy Junk, the company began hosting events that bridged the gap between the DIY "bush rave" culture and professional event management. One of the company's significant impacts was its ability to navigate the regulatory "mad haze" of the era, successfully negotiating with the Department of Racing, Gaming and Liquor to approve large-scale dance events outside of standard nightclub hours and locations.

Throughout its tenure, Delirium acted as a local gateway for international electronic acts. Strategic partnerships with Loaded Dice allowed for genre-spanning events that catered to the burgeoning Drum and bass and Techno communities simultaneously. On a national level, Delirium's involvement with Mellen Events and Future Entertainment ensured that Perth remained a viable stop for global tours, including the high-production Two Tribes festival circuit.

The company's digital presence was closely tied to community hubs Teknoscape and inthemix, which hosted forum discussions, gig announcements, and photo galleries that served as the primary record of the era's cultural activity.

== Notable events and festivals ==
Delirium productions were recognized for their high-production values, often incorporating immersive stage designs and multi-stage formats. Archival records from the Western Australian Rave Flyer Archive (W.A.R.F.) and sites like Hutchos Rave Page document the scale and rosters of these productions.

- Science Fiction: A flagship New Year's Eve brand held at venues like Belmont Park Racecourse. The Science Fiction '99 edition was a major milestone, reportedly attracting over 10,000 attendees and featuring English electronic musician Squarepusher.
- Sunshine People & Delirious: Outdoor summer festivals staged at the Belvoir Amphitheatre. The Delirious 2002 event featured international headliners including Adam Beyer, Joel Mull, and Peace Division.
- Digital: Staged at the Perth Entertainment Centre, this high-capacity event featured major international breaks and electronic acts such as The Freestylers.
- Two Tribes (WA): Staged at Mulberry on Swan in 2005 in partnership with Mellen Events and Future Entertainment, headlined by The Prodigy.
- Plastik: A recurring club night launched in 1998 at venues such as Gilkinsons and The Globe Nightclub, credited with popularizing Progressive house and techno in Perth.

== Online presence and media ==
Delirium maintained a digital presence on Teknoscape and inthemix, providing event coverage, reviews, and community engagement. Teknoscape, in particular, offered gig announcements, photo galleries, and fan commentary.

== Legacy and recognition ==
The company’s operations concluded following the death of Jeremy Junk in 2013. Junk’s influence extended beyond promotion; he was a long-time host on community radio station RTRFM, known for programs such as Loony Choons and Full Frequency.

Delirium's impact is preserved through archival content on Teknoscape, inthemix and National Library of Australia In 2013, Junk was posthumously inducted into the Perth Dance Music Awards (PDMA) Hall of Fame. The citation highlighted the scale of Delirium's ambition:

"It was nothing short of a brave venture, hosting big names on multi-stages at venues that seemed beyond our comprehension. It had never been done before, and became something of a mad haze for statutory bodies to comprehend and ultimately, approve."

== See also ==
- Breakfest
- RTRFM
- X-Press Magazine
- Teknoscape
- List of electronic music festivals
