= Belvoir Amphitheatre =

Event venue

Coordinates: 31.7916°S 116.0167°E

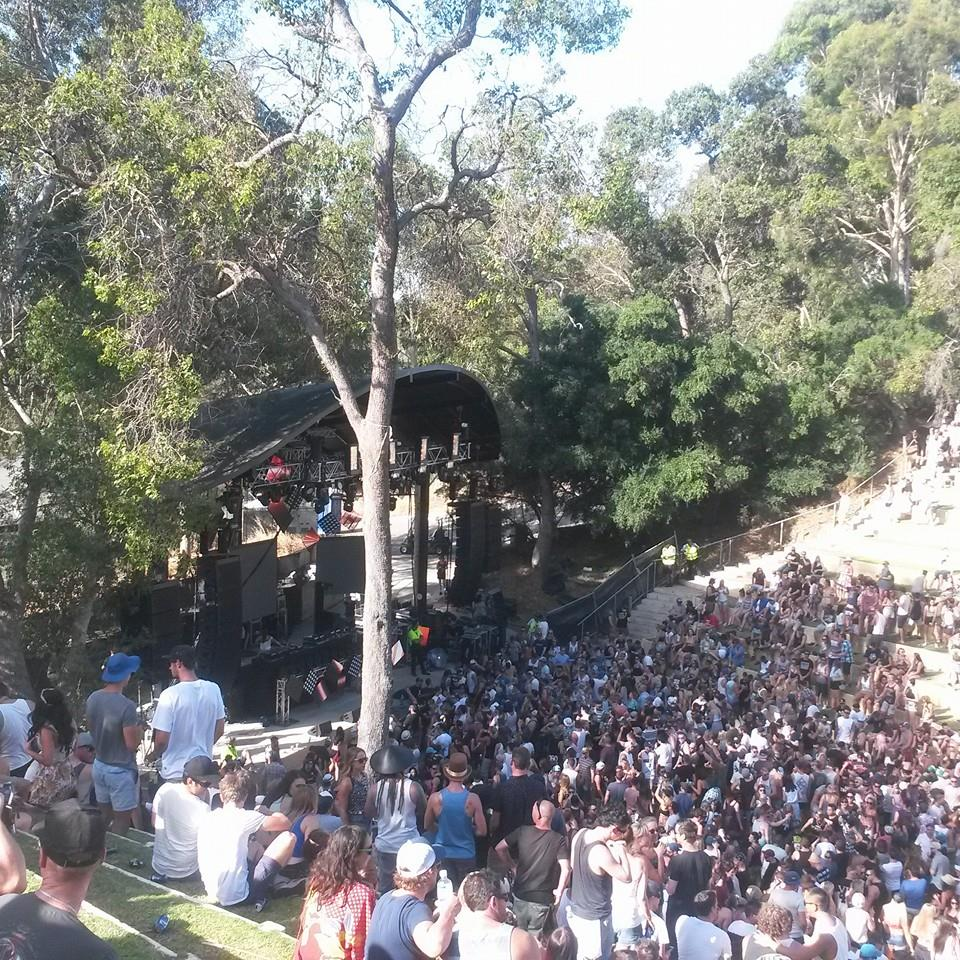
- Belvoir Amphitheatre
- Interactive map of Belvoir Amphitheatre
- Address: Belvoir Road, Upper Swan, Western Australia
- Location: Upper Swan, Perth, Western Australia
- Seating type: Tiered, natural amphitheatre
- Capacity: 4000 - 18,000 according to setup
- Type: Outdoor amphitheatre

Construction
- Opened: 1990s

Website
- Belvoir.net.au

The Belvoir Amphitheatre is an open-air performance venue situated in Upper Swan, Western Australia, approximately 35 kilometres north-east of Perth, nestled in the scenic Swan Valley wine region. Surrounded by native bushland, it is known for its natural acoustics and terraced hillside setting, offering panoramic views of the stage and skyline.

The venue has been officially closed since Belvoir Homestead went up for sale in 2017, with occasional special events still being held.

== Overview ==
Established in the 1990s, Belvoir Amphitheatre is one of Western Australia's most iconic outdoor music venues. Designed to integrate with the natural landscape, it features tiered grassy seating carved into the hillside, creating an intimate yet expansive space. The venue is privately owned and has hosted a diverse range of events including contemporary music concerts, dance music festivals, classical performances, and theatrical productions.

Its unique layout and acoustic properties have made it a preferred choice for promoters seeking a natural environment and relaxed atmosphere. The venue is especially active during the summer months.

== History ==
The Belvoir Amphitheatre is located on the grounds of the historic Belvoir Homestead, a 19th-century estate that originally operated as part of the agricultural development of the Swan Valley. The homestead itself dates back to the mid-1800s and is an example of early colonial architecture in Western Australia, reflecting the pastoral heritage of the Upper Swan region. It served as a working farm and private residence for much of its early history, with connections to some of the pioneering families of the area.

In the late 20th century, the property's scenic setting and cultural significance inspired its transformation into an arts and performance venue. The natural amphitheatre was developed in the 1990s to complement the existing heritage structures, with care taken to preserve the landscape and integrate the venue into its environment. Early coverage and promotions from the venue's establishment period occasionally referred to the site as the Belvoir Theatre. The homestead and surrounding grounds now provide a historic backdrop for events, adding a layer of cultural depth to performances held at the site.

Belvoir gained prominence during the late 1990s and early 2000s with the rise of large-scale outdoor music festivals in Perth. Its combination of rural charm and professional staging infrastructure allowed it to become a staple for both national and international touring acts.

The venue has also been involved in community and arts events linked to the Perth International Arts Festival and other state-supported programs. Its location in the Swan Valley has also made it a crossover venue for wine, food, and lifestyle events.

== Notable events ==
Belvoir Amphitheatre has hosted a wide variety of music and cultural events over the years, including:

- Breakfest – An annual Boxing Day electronic and breakbeat music festival first held in 2001, and running until 2022.
- Parklife Festival – A touring electronic music event that regularly featured Belvoir on its Perth leg.
- Future Music Festival – Another national festival that utilised the venue for its scenic surroundings.
- Perth International Arts Festival – Hosting classical and contemporary performances during the festival season.
- Concerts by notable acts including Fatboy Slim, Missy Higgins, The Cat Empire, John Butler Trio, Angus & Julia Stone, and more.

It has also seen performances by electronic music pioneers such as Pendulum and events organised by local dance music promoters like Delirium and Boomtick.

== Media and cultural impact ==
The venue is frequently featured in music press and local media as a premier destination for live music in Perth. Community radio station RTRFM has promoted events at Belvoir and included it in coverage of local music culture. Reviews and event coverage have also appeared in local publications such as X-Press Magazine and Cyclic Defrost.

== Access and facilities ==
Due to its rural location, access is primarily by private vehicle. Parking is available on-site but may be limited during major events. Public transport access is minimal; however, shuttle bus services are often arranged by event organisers to connect patrons with key transport hubs in Perth.

Facilities include food and beverage vendors, licensed bars, and basic amenities. As an outdoor venue, attendees are encouraged to prepare for variable weather conditions.

== See also ==
- List of music venues in Australia
- Culture of Perth, Western Australia
- RTRFM
- Breakfest
- Teknoscape
