= Music of Perth =

Aspect of the culture of Perth

Perth, the capital city of Western Australia, has played a significant role in shaping Australian music, producing a number of nationally and internationally successful artists across a broad range of genres. Prominent performers associated with Perth include Pendulum, Kevin Parker, Troye Sivan, Rolf Harris, David Helfgott, Luke Steele, and Tim Minchin. The city has been a notable incubator of talent in rock, classical, electronic, and experimental music.

== History ==
Perth’s geographic isolation has long posed a challenge for emerging artists, increasing the cost of travel and reducing access to major industry networks. Many acts have historically relocated to Sydney, Melbourne, or overseas to advance their careers. This includes influential bands such as The Triffids and the globally successful electronic act Pendulum, who gained international recognition after relocating to the United Kingdom.

== Current ==
The Perth International Arts Festival continues to be the longest-running multi-arts festival in Australia. Other major music institutions include the West Australian Opera and the West Australian Symphony Orchestra.

=== Popular music ===
Perth maintains a thriving music scene across rock, pop, hip hop, and electronic genres. The city is home to internationally acclaimed acts such as Tame Impala, Troye Sivan, Eskimo Joe, Birds of Tokyo, San Cisco, Stella Donnelly, Pond, Methyl Ethel, The Waifs, and John Butler Trio.

Notably, Perth is the birthplace of the electronic groups Pendulum and Knife Party. Formed in 2002, Pendulum helped popularise drum and bass and electronic rock on a global scale. Their debut album Hold Your Colour (2005) is regarded as one of the most successful drum and bass albums of all time. After relocating to the UK, founding members Rob Swire and Gareth McGrillen launched Knife Party, a side project that embraced dubstep, electro house, and bass-heavy EDM. Knife Party’s success solidified Perth’s contribution to global electronic music culture.

The city’s vibrant underground scene was pivotal in supporting acts like Pendulum in their early years, particularly through events promoted on local forums such as Teknoscape, and radio support from the community station RTRFM. RTRFM has been instrumental in showcasing emerging and alternative talent across genres, including electronic music, often airing early tracks from local producers and DJs.

Perth’s hip hop community includes artists like Drapht, Downsyde, and Matty B, many of whom are affiliated with the local Syllabolix crew. On the heavier side, the city has spawned punk and hardcore bands such as The Victims, The Scientists, Miles Away, An Evening At Elmwood and Voyager, the latter of whom represented Australia in the Eurovision Song Contest 2023.

=== Classical ===
Perth supports a diverse classical music ecosystem. The West Australian Symphony Orchestra performs at the Perth Concert Hall and throughout the state. Youth development is fostered by the West Australian Youth Music Association (WAYMA), which hosts multiple ensembles and choirs.

== Radio ==
Perth is serviced by a variety of commercial, public, and community radio stations. National broadcasters include Triple J and ABC Classic, which frequently support emerging Australian talent. Community stations such as RTRFM play a vital role in nurturing Perth’s diverse music scenes. RTRFM, a volunteer-driven station, airs specialist programs across genres—from local indie and hip hop to experimental and electronic music—and serves as a platform for independent artists and music journalism.

== Music press ==
Perth has a long history of independent music journalism and alternative media that has supported and documented the local scene. Throughout the 1990s and 2000s, publications such as X-Press Magazine and Drum Media (later renamed The Music) provided in-depth coverage of local and touring acts, gig guides, album reviews, and artist interviews. These free weekly magazines were distributed throughout music venues, record stores, and cafes, and were a primary source of music news for Perth audiences.

Earlier underground fanzines like Party Fears, Vortex, and Loophole played a crucial role in covering punk, alternative, and DIY scenes. Party Fears, in particular, often included free flexi-discs featuring local bands and is remembered for its documentation of Perth’s 1980s post-punk and indie scene.

University publications such as Grok Magazine (Curtin University), Pelican (University of Western Australia), and Metior (Murdoch University) have also contributed to the city’s music press, offering emerging writers a platform and covering both mainstream and underground music culture.

In the digital age, online platforms like Cool Perth Nights, Spaceship News, and Teknoscape have continued the tradition, focusing on live music, electronic dance culture, and community events. Teknoscape in particular became an influential online hub for the Perth rave and drum and bass scenes in the early 2000s, with forums, event listings, and artist features that helped launch or support careers like those of Pendulum, Greg Packer, and JPS.

Despite challenges to print media, the legacy of Perth’s independent music press continues to shape the narrative and memory of its music culture.

== See also ==
- List of musical acts from Western Australia
- Category:Music venues in Perth, Western Australia
