= Future Music Festival Asia =

Former electronic music festival

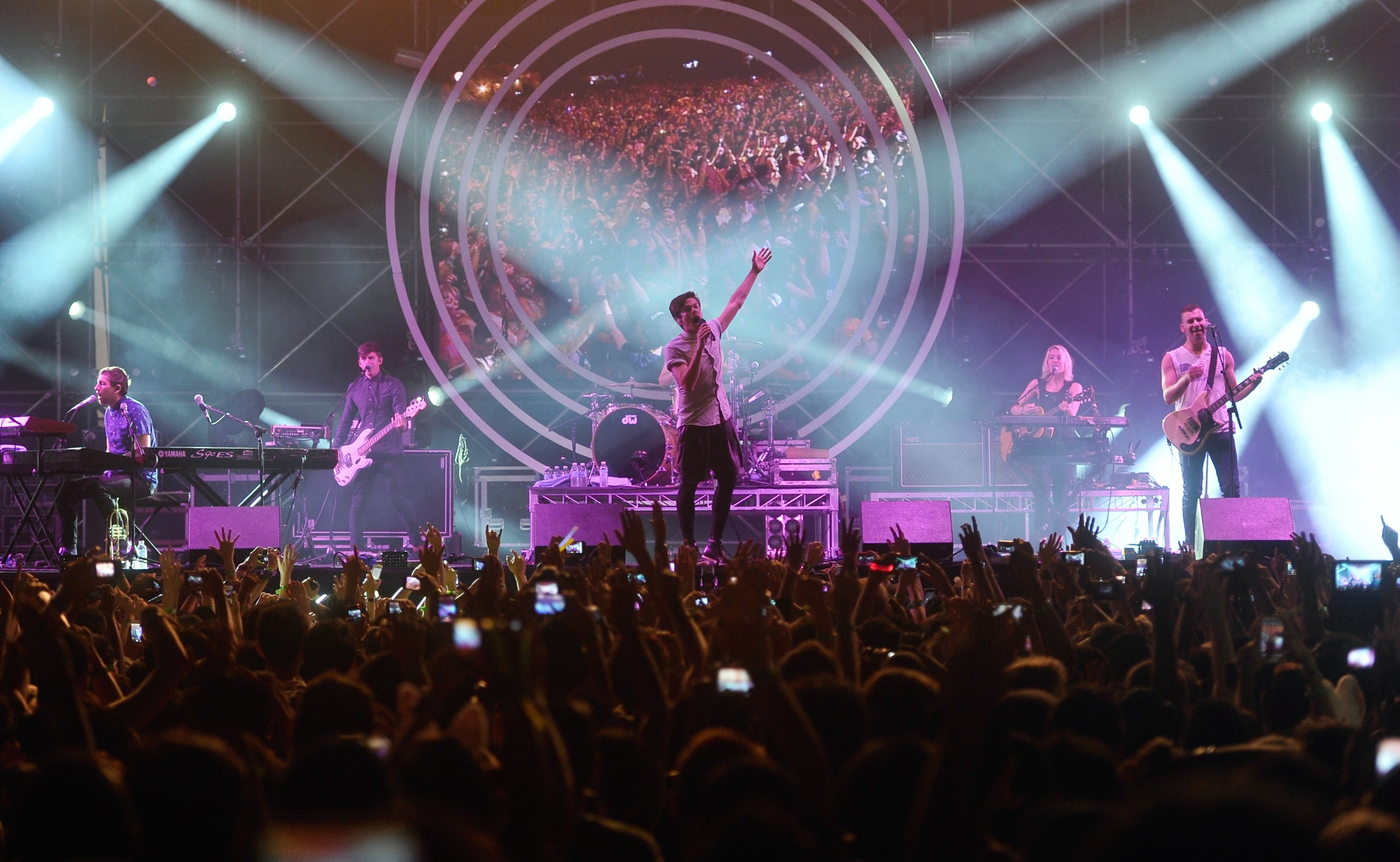
- FUN during FMFA 2013
- Genre: Electronic, dance, indie rock
- Dates: Mid-March
- Location: Malaysia: Kuala Lumpur
- Years active: 2012–2014
- Founders: Future Entertainment and Livescape Asia
- Website: livescape.asia

Future Music Festival Asia, often abbreviated as FMFA, was an annual music festival featuring local and international artists held in Kuala Lumpur, Malaysia. The festival was a franchise of Future Entertainment's successful Future Music Festival that has been running in Australia since 2006. Future Music Festival Asia was inaugurated in 2012, and has been headlined by notable acts such as The Temper Trap, Chemical Brothers, Flo Rida, The Prodigy, Psy and Fun.

== FMFA 2012 ==
The festival began in 2012 as a one-day music festival at the Sepang International Circuit, featuring a mix of local and international acts. The inaugural event was officiated by Dato' Sri Dr. Ng Yen Yen, Malaysia's Tourism Minister at that time. The festival claimed to have seen an attendance of over 20,000 people from Malaysia and across the region.

== FMFA 2013 ==
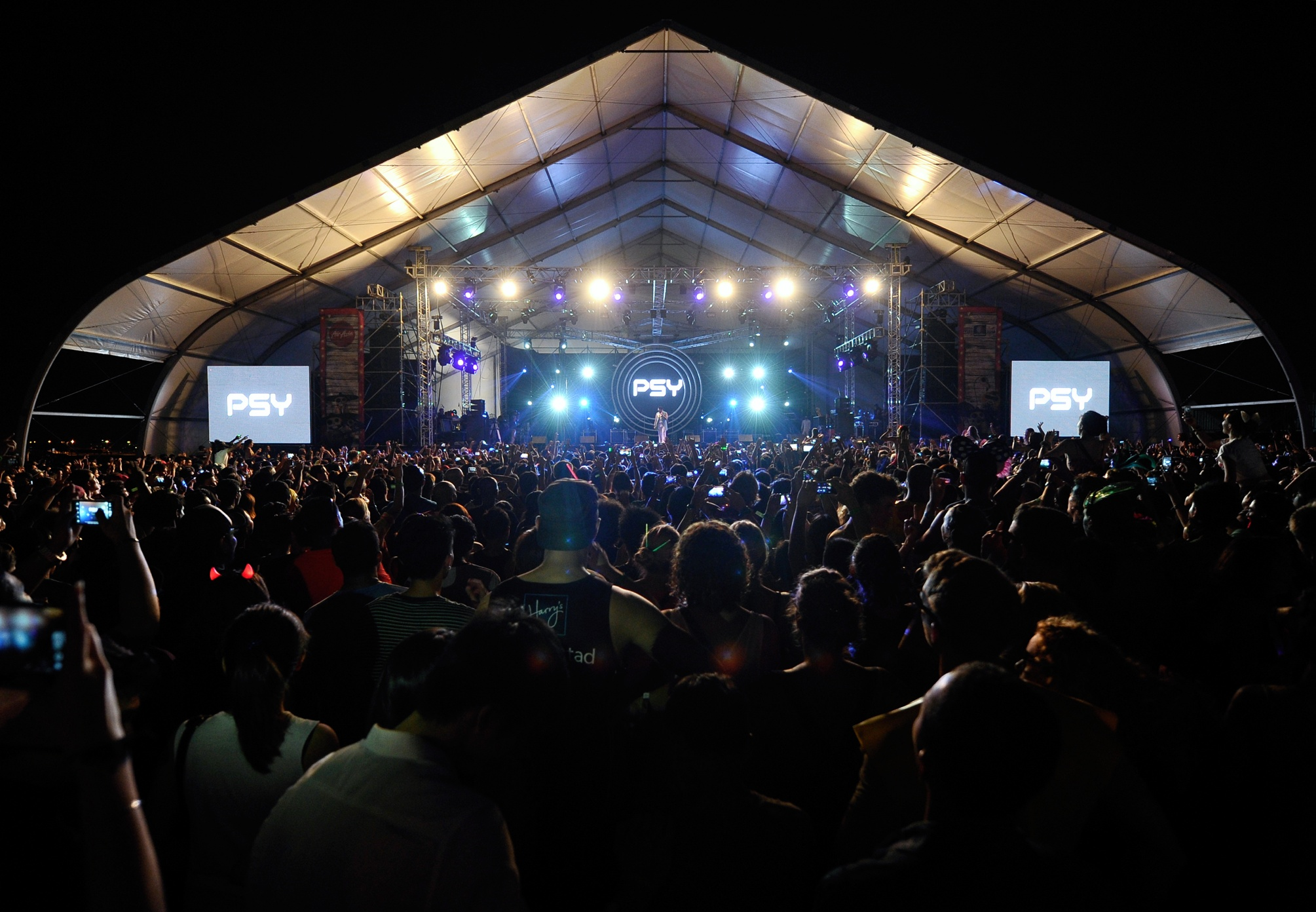
The crowd during FMFA 2013.

Future Music Festival Asia returned in 2013 with a two-day festival which featured prominent trance DJ Armin van Buuren's A State of Trance 600 on Day One, followed by a second day of local and international live music acts. Headliners included major trance acts on Day One such as Armin van Buuren, W&W, and Cosmic Gate, while Day Two saw PSY, The Prodigy, Rita Ora, Fun., The Temper Trap, and Rudimental, among others. Future Music Festival Asia 2013 was reported to have attracted more than 55,000 fans over the two-day festival.

Reception towards the festival have been largely positive, but there have been numerous complains about the venue's traffic problems and the lack of public transportation.

== FMFA 2014 ==
The organizers of Future Music Festival Asia announced in 2013 that the next installment of the festival will be a three-day event, taking place from 13–15 March 2014. Mines Resort City was initially announced as the venue, but it had been changed to the car park of the Bukit Jalil National Stadium. The festival expected to draw a total crowd of more than 75,000 festival goers over three days, and over 20,000 tourists.

The festival was slated to cover a span of three days: the Future Music Festival 2014 Opening Party featuring controversial Canadian DJ Deadmau5 on 13 March 2014, A State of Trance 650 with Armin van Buuren on 14 March 2014, and the main safari-themed event featuring Pharrell Williams, Macklemore & Ryan Lewis, and many other artists on 15 March 2014. Kuala Lumpur is the only location other than Miami where A State of Trance has returned to for the second time. Six drug-related deaths were reported in association with Day 2 of the festival, which resulted in the cancellation of Day 3 as instructed by local authorities. More than a year later, it was confirmed via post-mortem results issued two months after the incident showed that the cause of deaths were due to heatstroke, with drugs playing a negligible role. Yet, the authorities did not make the results known

== Artist lineups ==
=== 2012 International Line-up ===
- Chemical Brothers
- Flo Rida
- Tinie Tempah
- Chase & Status (live)
- The Wombats
- Pendulum
- Grandmaster Flash
- Sneaky Sound System
- Cosmic Gate
- Eddie Halliwell
- John 00 Fleming
- Hercules & Love Affair
- The Juan Maclean
- Alex Metric
- Azari & III
- The Potbelleez
- Kid Sister
- Holy Ghost!
- Super 8 & Tab
- Ruby Rose
- The Stafford Brothers
- Andy Murphy
- Timmy Trumpet

=== 2013 International Line-up ===
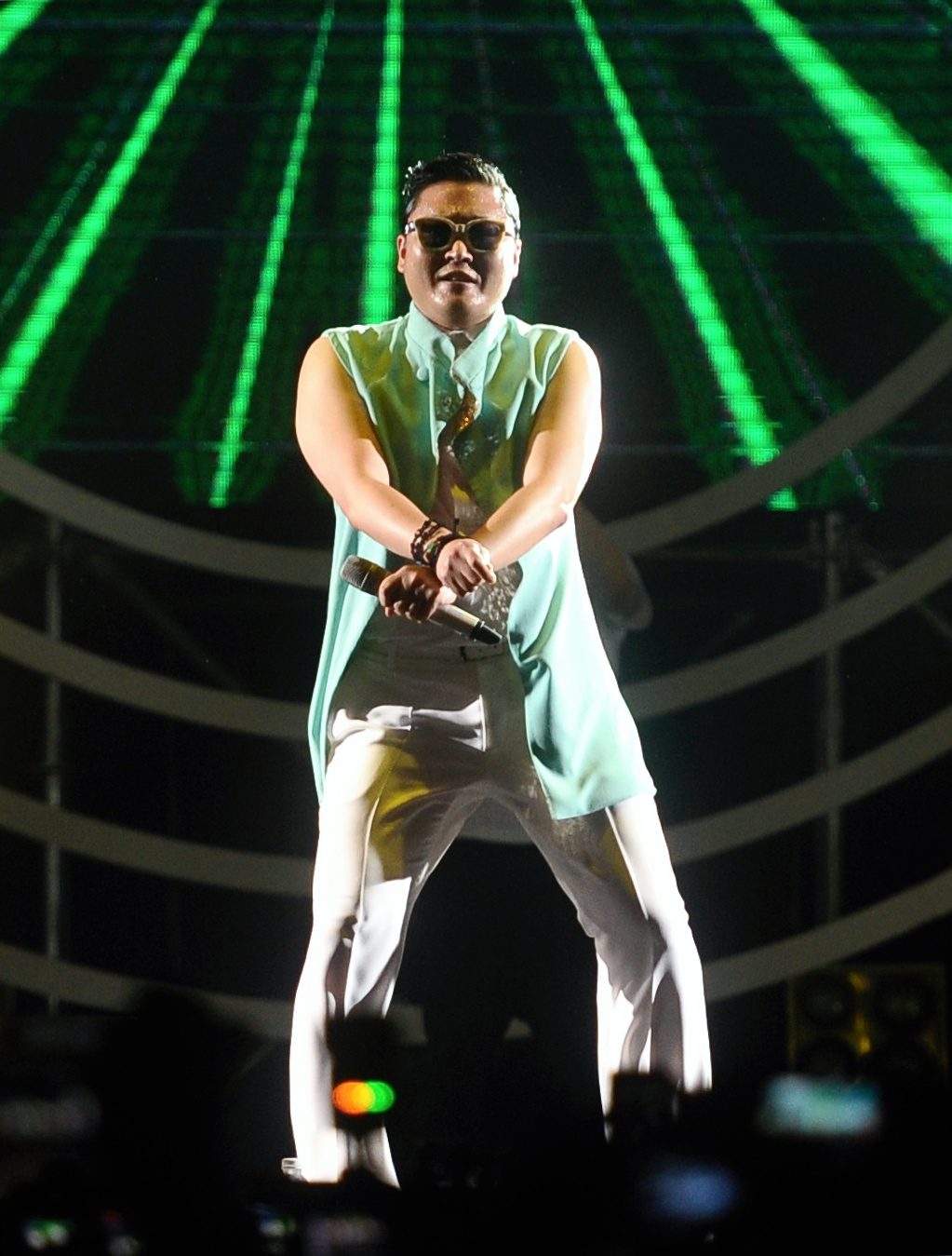
PSY during FMFA 2013.

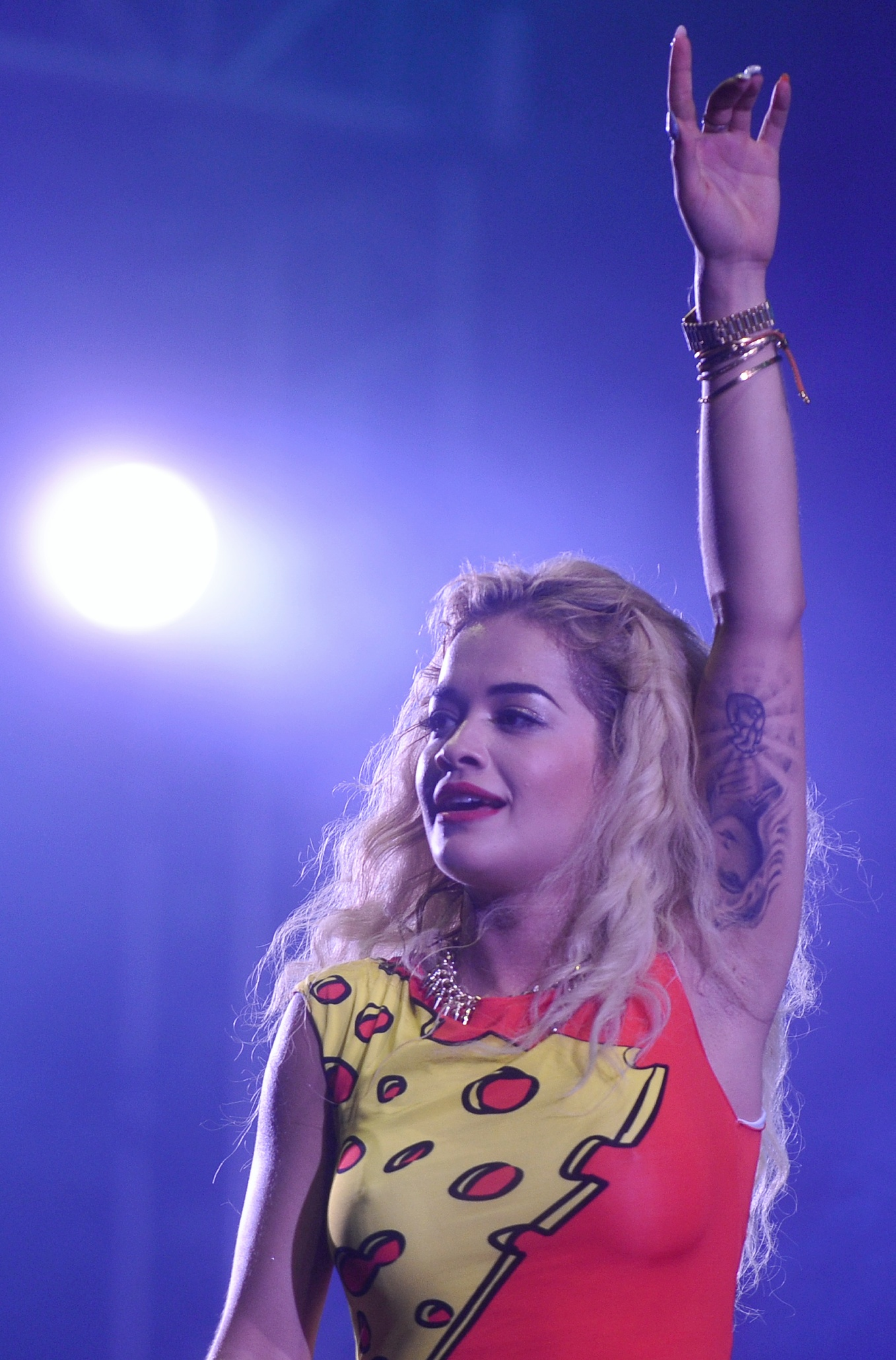
Rita Ora during FMFA 2013.

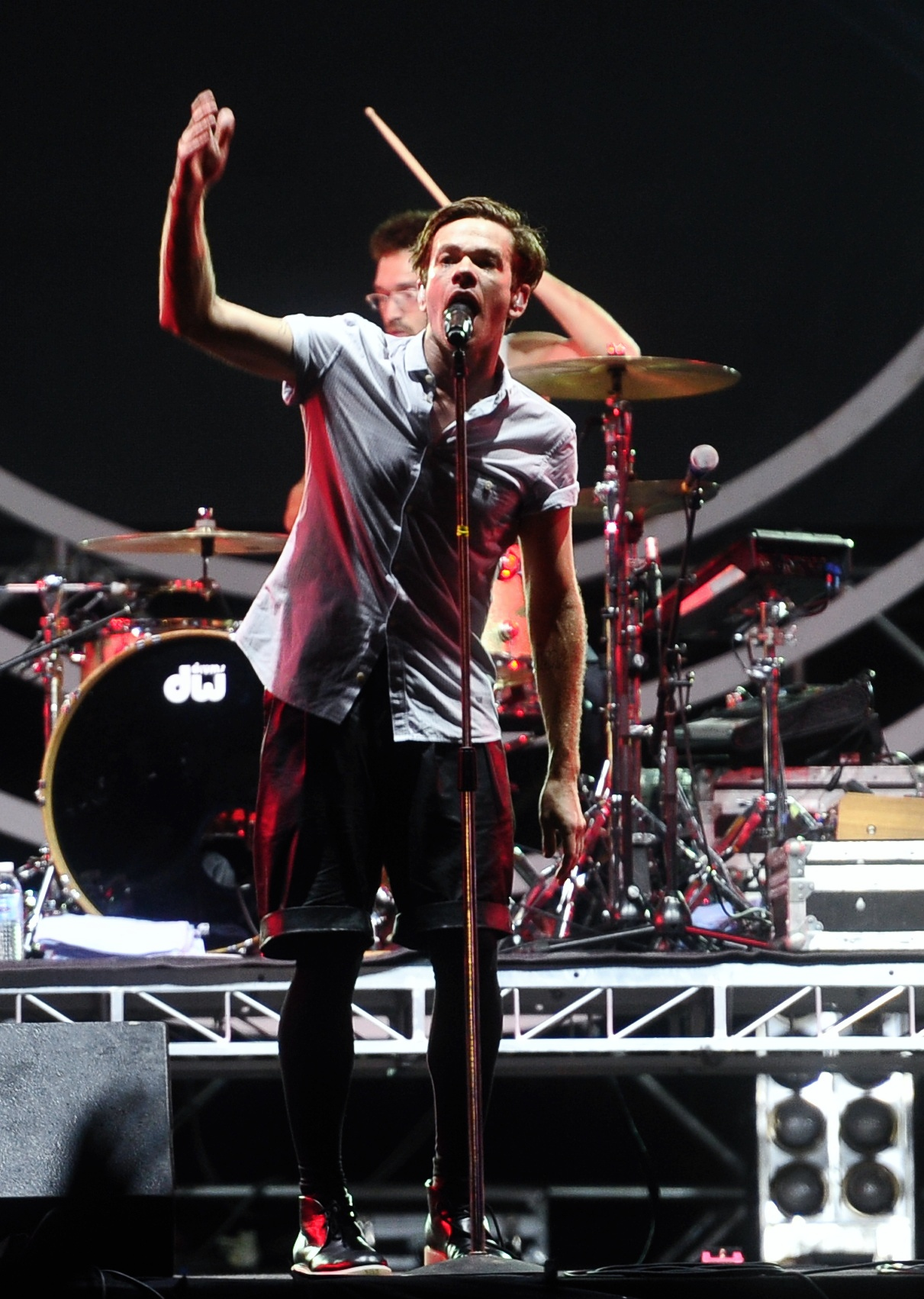
FUN during FMFA 2013.

- Armin Van Buuren
- Aly & Fila
- Ben Gold
- Cosmic Gate
- Super8 & Tab
- W&W
- The Prodigy
- PSY
- Rita Ora
- Fun.
- Bloc Party
- The Temper Trap
- Rudimental
- DJ Fresh
- Stafford Brothers
- Timmy Trumpet
- Tenzin
- Feed Me
- Kill The Noise
- Zeds Dead
- Naughty by Nature
- De La Soul
- Sidney Samson
- Angger Dimas
- Ladytron
- Andy Moor
- Idiotape (South Korea)
- Shut Da Mouth (South Korea)
- Sixteen (Indonesia)
- DJ Stas (Singapore)
- DJ Bento (Japan)

=== 2014 Full Line-up ===
- Pharrell Williams
- Martin Garrix
- Marlo
- DJ Tosh Irama
- Bassjackers
- DJ Rosh
- Will Sparks
- Andrew Rayel
- Omnia
- Tenzin
- Rosh
- KOPIGO
- Sound Love Affair
- Deadmau5
- Macklemore & Ryan Lewis
- Axel Groove
- Wu-Tang Clan Ft. Method Man, Ghostface Killah & Raekwon
- Knife Party
- Gesaffelstein
- Rudimental
- Chase and Status
- Naughty Boy
- Sub Focus
- Tinie Tempah
- Porter Robinson
- Eric Prydz
- Paul van Dyk
- ATB
- Adventure Club Ft. YUNA
- Arty
- Baauer
- Brodinski
- Carnage
- Marcus Schulz
- Monsta
- R3hab
- Deniz Koyu

== See also ==
- Future Entertainment
- Summadayze
- Good Life Festival
- List of electronic music festivals
