= Mansion nightclub =

Historic building in Melbourne, Australia

Coordinates: 37°51′15.91″S 144°58′49.87″E

The Mansion, located at 83 Queens Road in Melbourne, Australia, was a notable electronic music venue in the 1990s. The Mansion was once voted No.7 in the world’s top 10 clubs.

== History ==
The property was originally named Clarence House and was built in 1898 for financier Lawrence Benjamin, one of the many mansions and large houses built along Queens Road and St Kilda Road from the 1880s into the 1910s. Built in Renaissance Revival style, it features a long south facade, with a central bow window, and a double height arcaded verandah returning along the west side. Early plans show that the east section must have been added at some point. A later occupant was William Jamieson, a civil surveyor and businessman, who died at Clarence House from cancer on 8 May 1926. When it was sold in 1950, it was described as mansion of 32 rooms. In the late 1960s as part of the works on St Kilda Junction, Queen Road was tunnelled under, which involved taking some land from the site, ending up with the road quite close to the house. By the 1990s, it was heritage listed, along with all the other remaining mansions on St Kilda Road and Queens Road.

== Musical artists / DJs ==
Renaissance parties were held with local and international DJs every year bringing the sounds of the UK club and record label to Australia.

== Closure ==
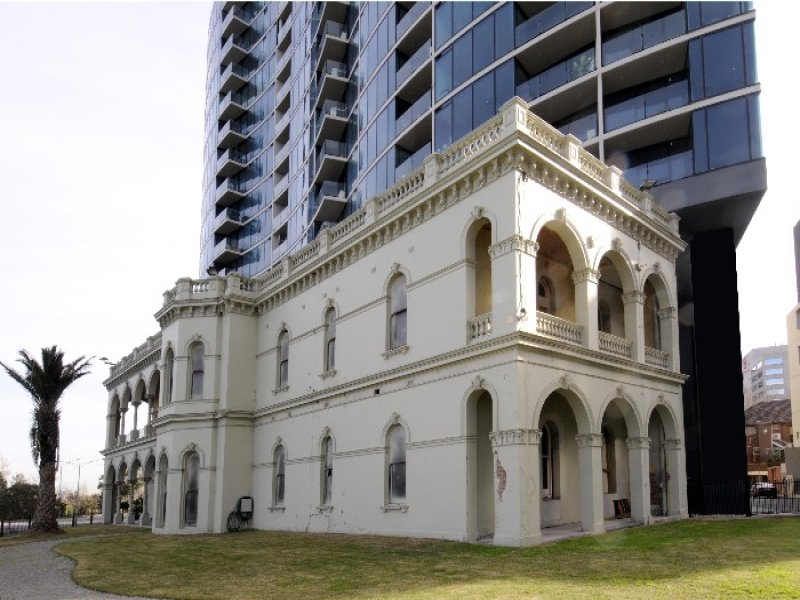
The Mansions's exterior (side view), Jan 2009

Though relatively isolated, if the Mansion was ever to remain a nightclub it would need to be soundproofed if the venue was to comply with zoning rules and noise emission constraints.

The club closed about 2001, and an apartment tower above and behind the mansion was planned for the site. While construction on the apartment complex site was underway in 2004 one builder was killed and many others were injured whilst working on the eighth storey. The company involved in pouring the moulds for the concrete pillars, Melbourne Transit Pty Ltd, was convicted and fined $100,000 by county court judge for breaching occupation and safety regulations and forced into liquidation. It was then purchased by property developers City Pacific in 2006, who commissioned the Buchan Group to build the apartment tower. By then, the house itself had been converted into six apartments.

The retention of the heritage building imposed physical constraints, with the tower squeezed behind and partly over the building. With a 3-storey underground car park that extended 10 metres below ground surface level, the Mansion building had to be safely supported.

== See also ==
- List of electronic dance music venues
- Future Entertainment
- Summadayze
- Future Music Festival
