= The Brow =

Australian band

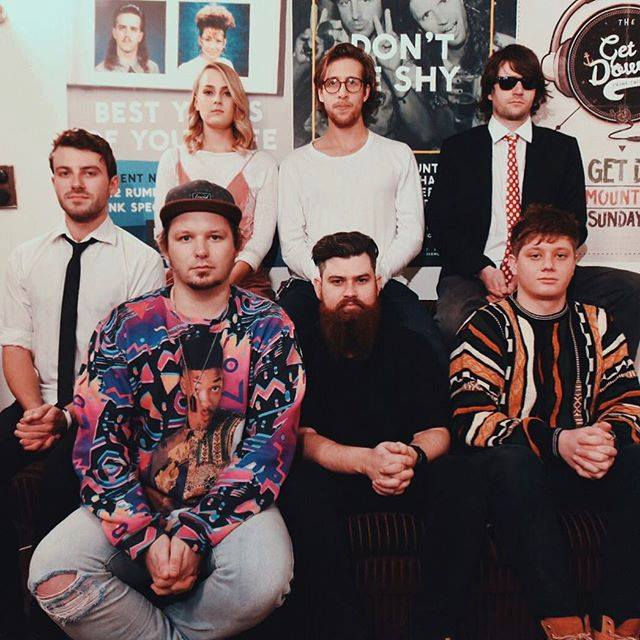
- The Brow

Background information
- Also known as: Brow Horn Orchestra
- Origin: Fremantle, Western Australia, Australia
- Genres: Hip-hop, electronic, soul
- Years active: 2009–present
- Label: Independent
- Members: Jahlil Willis; Alex Vaughan; Nicholas Owen; Karri Harper Meredith; Benjamin Fear; Josh Ellis; Talia Hart; Sam Timmerman; Josh Terlick
- Past members: Benjamin Lanzon; Sky Eaton; Lyndon Blue; Angelique Ross; Lauren Todhunter; Jake Chaloner; Rhian Todhunter
- Website: Official website

The Brow, formerly Brow Horn Orchestra, is a band from Fremantle, Western Australia. Current members are Nicholas Owen, Ben Fear, Karri Harper Meredith, Josh Ellis, Sam Timmerman, Josh Terlick, and Talia Hart.

== History ==
Nicholas Owen and Karri Harper Meredith started playing together in 2007 as a busking duo performing on the streets of Fremantle in the business district. Their initial and primary aim was to raise money for expensive musical equipment to add to their live show and over the year slowly built up an impressive array of instruments, lights and PA gear excessive to the band's member ratio. The pair's first big show was in a band competition AmpFest, a great networking tool for The Brow to pick up some other gigs with local bands. During this period the duo played largely jam-based material and some early renditions of songs which evolved onto The Brow's touring repertoire. In 2008, the pair introduced two new members with Alex Vaughan aka Quills (or later to be known as Emcee Rezide) and guitarist / bassist Rhian Todhunter joining the band with an immediate goal to compete in a university band competition, (National Campus Band Competition). The four piece were moderately successful making their way through to the state finals, however made a bigger comeback the following year winning and went on to win the state final of the competition and were flown to the Gold Coast, Queensland to perform in the national finals at Sea World. During this time, the band expanded their lineup with members Sky Eaton (trumpet, vocals, synths) Angelique Ross (clarinet, tenor saxophone) and Lyndon Blue (violin, bass, guitar, vocals) also joining the band before winning the competition. Shortly after their return in late November 2009, live drummer Ben Lanzon joined the band and The Brow changed their name to The Brow Horn Orchestra.

Their first notable gig with the new lineup and name (and debut show for drummer Ben Lanzon) was performing at prominent community radio station RTRFM's 'Seriously Sound System' summer dance festival in December 2009 where the band also debuted a track "Goliath", which went on to be their first leading single. The band started to build popularity making other small local festival appearances, including the 2010 Western Australian Circus Festival and a month-long residency at Leederville Hotel's infamous Funk Club in March 2010. During this period, members Lauren Todhunter (alto saxophone, percussion) and Jake Chaloner (electric guitar) also joined the band, and tuba player Wafi Zainal performed as a regular guest.

In May 2010 the band were nominated for an award at West Australian Music Industry Awards and were asked to play at the awards night. In line with this they received their first national recognition with a demo recording of their track "Dreams Do Come & Go" receiving airtime on Triple J ahead of their performance at the 2010 WAMi Awards Night. On the awards night, the band won the industry nominated category Best Funk Act at the 2010 West Australian Music Industry Awards. In July 2010, Rhian Todhunter left the band, with Jake and Lyndon taking on more bass and guitar duties. Later in the year in August 2010, the band won the prestigious Next Big Thing Competition which has seen acts such as John Butler, Tame Impala and Snowman rise to stardom through the competition. and to the critical acclaim from the local street press publications voicing that the band were Perth's next big thing whether they took out the title or not. During this period the band were taken on by JumpClimb Music and Management, an emerging events and management company who fell in love with the band after they played a show the team organised called Coopers Sunday Green which married the brilliant concept of lawn balls and live music. In October 2010 guitarist Jake Chaloner, not liking the continued electronic direction of the band, started making his other project playing in James Teague's band a priority before shortly leaving a few weeks later. In November 2010, the band won Best Live Act and Best Hip-Hop Act at the 2010 Perth Dance Music Awards whilst receiving Best Live Act again at the 2011 awards.

Over the summer of 2010–2011 the band grew further in popularity, with a sold-out debut single launch at Subiaco's Llama Bar and slots on big local festivals including Southbound, Nannup Music Festival, Future Music Festival, Hyperfest (2010 & 2011), and supporting a variety of nationally and internationally touring acts including playing to a sell out crowd on New Year's Eve supporting Atlanta hip hop outfit Arrested Development. During this time the band received further national airplay off their first official single release "Goliath" / "Don't You Want To Sing Forever", with both tracks receiving Triple J airtime. In January 2011, the Brow Horn Orchestra were chosen as Triple J Unearthed Feature Artists for the week, with their music showcased across the website and played on the station throughout the week. They also won a WAMi Award in 2011 for best music video with the win covered by Video Hits (Australia's longest-running music video show), who interviewed the band on the awards night.

The band released their debut EP in September 2011 to a sold out 800 capacity crowd with numerous tracks off the record receiving airplay from national radio station Triple J, with single 'Every Single Day' played on medium rotation and later nominated for the Hottest 100 voting list. In November 2011 members Alex Vaughan and Lauren Todhunter left the band to have a baby together, start a family and focus on solo projects. Regular guest collaborator, Benjamin Fear then joined the band full time ahead of their December 2011 debut east coast tour taking up duties on guitar and vocals as an emcee. As the band's popularity and busy schedule continued over the 2011 / 2012 summer period, bass player and violinist Lyndon Blue left the band from a full time capacity to focus on his own group and main project Seams. A few months later, Sax / Clarinet player Angelique left the band to pursue study in Melbourne at a circus school. With a big change in the band's lineup into a condensed five piece format, the writing of the band's follow up EP found itself influenced by the changes in the band with a focus to become more production heavy on record.

The Brow Horn Orchestra spent the first few months of 2012 writing the new record "Two Fires" with the new core line-up and released the record late June with the leading single Fade to rave reviews from the press & Triple J. The EP was picked up by MGM Distribution helping spread the music nationally across Australia and to the wider world which started receiving positive reviews through the media and blog sites. The band spent the rest of 2012 on several national tours supporting the Two Fires record whilst playing showcase gigs at music business conferences such as Fuse in Adelaide and BigSound in Brisbane.

After spending 2013 touring the record and playing a range of festivals and shows across the country, The Brow Horn Orchestra changed their name back to The Brow ahead of recording their next record.

== Members ==
=== Current lineup ===
- Nicholas Owen — vocals, keyboards, arrangements, production
- Karri Harper Meredith — trombone, synths, percussion
- Ben Lanzon — drums, electronic percussion, triggers
- Sky Eaton — trumpet, synths, vocals
- Ben Fear — guitar, vocals

=== Guest musicians / fill-ins ===
Other guest musicians live / featured on various tracks:

- Alexandra Chetter — flute, vocals
- Chris Chen — bass, vocals
- Lyndon Blue (violin, bass, synths, vocals)
- Kaprou Lea (alto sax)
- Donovan De Souza (vocals)
- Jimmy 'lips' Murphy (trumpet)
- Minky Gardener (vocals)
- Shaun Thomas Cowe (drums, percussion)
- John Brown (drums, percussion)
- Shannon Booyens (trumpet)
- Wafi Zainal (tuba)

== Discography ==
=== Extended plays ===
Title	Details
Can't Afford This Way of Life	Released: September 2011; Label: DiskBank; Format: CD
Two Fires EP	Released: July 2012; Label: DiskBank; Format: CD

== Awards and nominations ==
=== Perth Dance Music Awards ===
The Perth Dance Music Awards (also known as "the PDMAs") highlights the year's major accomplishments in Electronic music by Western Australians. They ran until 2013. The Brow Horn Orchestra won four awards.

Year	Nominee / work	Award	Result (wins only)
2010	The Brow Horn Orchestra	Best Hip-Hop Act	Won
2010	The Brow Horn Orchestra	Best Live Act	Won
2011	The Brow Horn Orchestra	Best Live Act	Won
2012	The Brow Horn Orchestra	Best Live Act	Won

=== West Australian Music Industry Awards ===
The West Australian Music Industry Awards (WAMIs) are annual awards presented to the local contemporary music industry, put on annually by the Western Australian Music Industry Association Inc (WAM). The Brow Horn Orchestra won three awards.

Year	Nominee / work	Award	Result (wins only)
2010	The Brow Horn Orchestra	Best Funk Act	Won
2011	"Don't You Wanna Sing Forever"	Most Popular Music video	Won
2012	The Brow Horn Orchestra	Funk Act of the Year	Won
