= PDMA =

PDMA may refer to:

- Perth Dance Music Awards, a yearly Australian music award event.
- Polarisation division multiple access, a cellular network component.
- Power-division multiple access, a transmission power-sharing scheme
- Prescription Drug Marketing Act, an American federal law.
- Product Development and Management Association, a professional group for new product development
