= Voltaire Twins =

Australian new wave band

Voltaire Twins is an Australian new wave band from Perth, Western Australia, now based in Melbourne, consisting of lead vocalists & synthesiser players (and siblings) Jaymes and Tegan Voltaire.

The band performs live as a two-piece, with the twins playing synthesiser and guitar and singing.

The band was unearthed by national youth broadcaster Triple J in 2008, when they won the Triple J Unearthed Play at Parklife competition on the back of their song "D.I.L.", which received airplay on Triple J.

Their band's second single "Animalia", released in 2011, gained high rotation on Triple J, Fbi and RTRFM in Australia. It was released in the US in November 2011 and debuted at #36 on the USA college radio charts.

They went on to high-profile support slots for Ladytron, Maxïmo Park, Art vs. Science, Midnight Juggernauts and Lost Valentinos and festival slots at Parklife Music Festival, St Jerome's Laneway Festival, One Movement for Music, Summadayze, Good Vibrations Festival and Groovin' the Moo.

In March 2012, they performed at SXSW in Austin, Texas.

In 2014 the band moved to Melbourne to write and release their debut album. The first single, "Long Weekend", was released in February 2015, quickly followed by national airplay on Triple J, a remix by Luke Million and a national tour. The band followed this with another single, "Goodnight, Spiri"t, and announced their debut album Milky Waves would be released in August 2015.

== Discography ==
=== Albums ===
Title	Details
Milky Waves	Released: August 2015; Label: Ooragnak (OORA01); Format: CD, LP, DD

=== Extended plays ===
Title	Details
Voltaire Twins	Released: 2010; Label: Voltaire Twins; Format: CD
Romulus	Released: 2011; Label: Voltaire Twins; Format: CD
Apollo	Released: 2012; Label: Voltaire Twins; Format: CD

== Awards ==
=== West Australian Music Industry Awards ===
The West Australian Music Industry Awards are annual awards celebrating achievements for Western Australian music. They commenced in 1985. San Cisco won six awards in 2012.

Year	Nominee / work	Award	Result (wins only)
2012	Voltaire Twins	Dance/Electronic Act of the Year	Won
