= Metro City Concert Club =

Live music and nightclub venue in Perth, Western Australia

Coordinates: 31°56′50″S 115°51′12″E

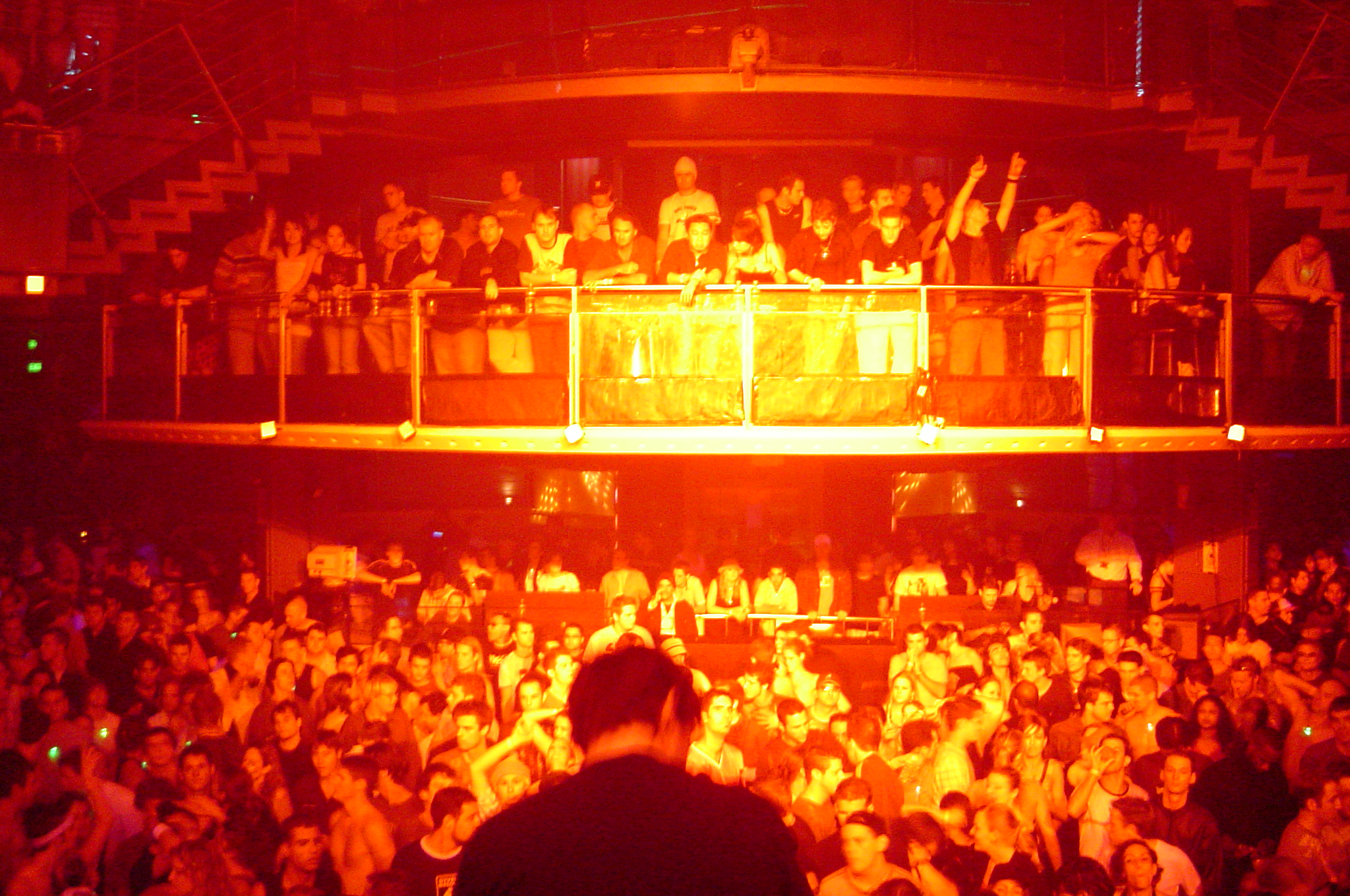
- Address: 146 Roe Street, Northbridge, Perth, Western Australia
- Type: Nightclub and live music venue
- Capacity: 2,000+

Construction
- Opened: 1996

Website
- Official website

Metro City Concert Club (often referred to simply as Metro City) is a large live music and entertainment venue located on Roe Street in Northbridge, a nightlife precinct in central Perth. The venue is known for hosting international touring acts, club nights, and themed events across multiple levels.

== History ==
Metro City was established in the 1990s in the Northbridge entertainment district, operating during a period of growth in Perth's live music and nightclub scene. Since its opening, it has hosted a diverse range of artists and genres, including electronic dance events, rock concerts, and R&B performances.

== Ownership ==
In 2018, local businessman John Kizon was reported to have claimed a financial interest in Metro City Concert Club but later retracted the statement, describing it as a “slip of the tongue.” As of 2025, the venue is registered to corporate entities with offshore ownership structures, though the ultimate controlling interests are not publicly disclosed.

== Venue and design ==
The official site describes the venue as having a capacity exceeding 2,000 patrons, spread across three levels and multiple entertainment areas. Independent listings also note its flexible layout and ability to host diverse event types, from live bands to large-scale DJ events. The venue's schedule includes a frequent rotation of local and international touring acts, with its event history tracked on platforms such as Resident Advisor and Concert Archives

== Notable performances ==
Over the years, Metro City has hosted performances by a range of international and Australian acts, including Calvin Harris, The Presets, The Prodigy, and Pendulum. Recent concerts include:

- Everything Everything and The Vaccines (2024)
- Evanescence – intimate headline show (2024)

== Events ==
Metro City Concert Club hosts a wide variety of events, including live performances, themed club nights, and large-scale electronic music parties. The venue’s events calendar features both local and international DJs and performers.

== Licensing and operations ==
Metro City operates under a full liquor license with extended hours. Its licensed operational times are as follows:

- Monday – Saturday: 6:00 PM – 5:00 AM
- Sunday: 8:00 PM – 2:00 AM

All events are strictly 18+ and require valid ID for entry. Dress codes may apply, and the venue reserves the right to refuse entry.

== Redevelopment and nightlife changes (2010–2020) ==
Between 2010 and 2020, Metro City underwent several facility and operational changes. These included:

- Upgrades to sound and lighting systems.
- Renovations of interior spaces, including the addition of VIP areas and improved bar facilities.
- The venue expanded its programming to include a wider variety of events, such as electronic dance music nights, themed parties, and international DJ performances.

== See also ==
- Music of Perth
- Metropolis Fremantle
