= Metropolis Fremantle =

Theatre and music venue in Fremantle, Western Australia

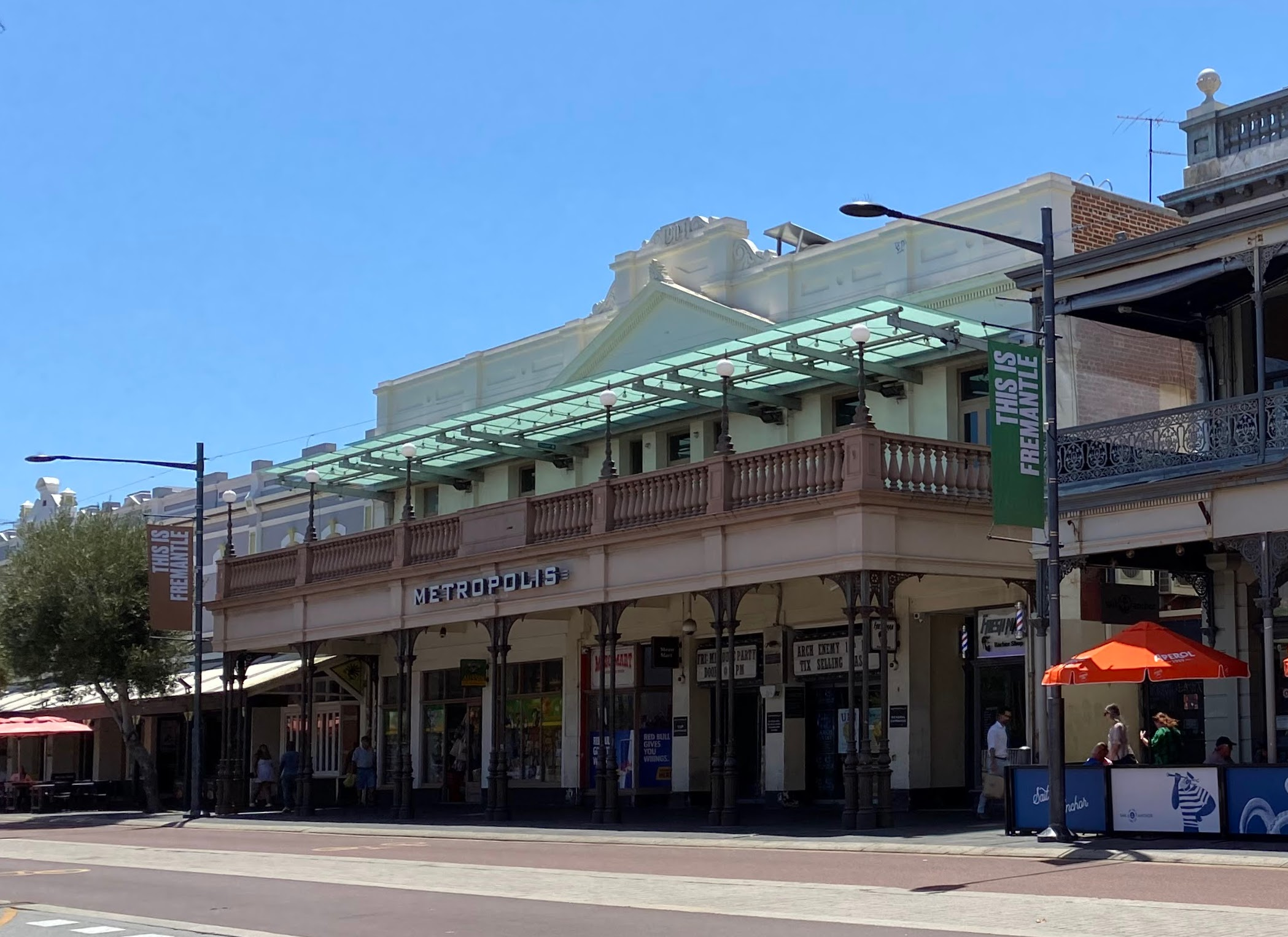
- Metropolis in 2023
- Interactive map of the Metropolis Fremantle area
- Former names: King's Theatre, Dalkeith Opera House, Metropolis Concert Club Fremantle

General information
- Architectural style: Federation Free Style
- Location: 58 South Terrace, Fremantle, Fremantle, Australia
- Coordinates: 32°03′21″S 115°44′55″E
- Groundbreaking: 1904
- Opened: 27 September 1904
- Renovated: 2000-02
- Owner: James Gallop

Technical details
- Floor count: 2

Design and construction
- Architect: Federick William Burwell
- Main contractor: James Brownlie

Other information
- Seating capacity: 1,200

Website
- www.metropolisfremantle.com.au

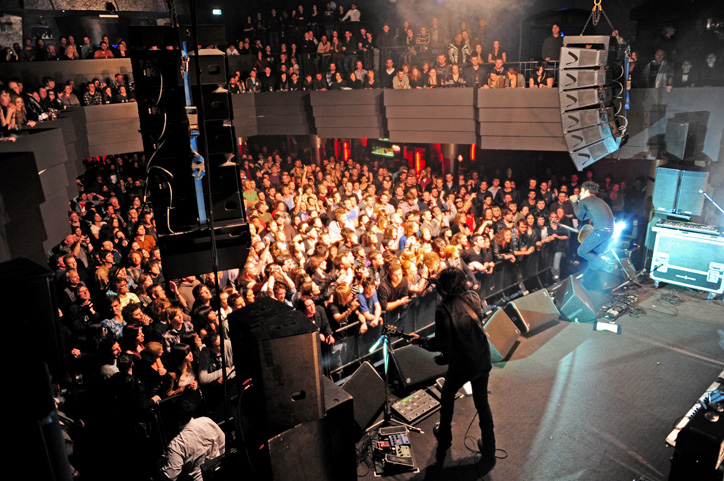
Black Rebel Motorcycle Club performing at Metropolis in 2010

Metropolis Fremantle, formerly known as King's Theatre, is a performance venue and nightclub located at 58 South Terrace, Fremantle, adjacent to the Sail and Anchor Hotel.

== History ==
The property was the site of the "Old Englyshe Fayre", an open area entertainment venue, built by Court, Butcher and Co (Elsie Court and Thomas W. Butcher) in 1897. The foundation stone for the theatre was laid by the owner, James Gallop, on 20 February 1904. Tenders for the project had been let in January of that year and when the foundation ceremony was performed, James Brownlie, the contractor, had completed the foundations and commenced the brickwork for all external walls. The project consisted of the theatre and five shops on a site adjoining the Freemasons Hotel, (now Sail and Anchor Hotel) at that time also owned by James Gallop. Entry was between shops into a foyer on ground floor, to stalls in the auditorium and a staircase led to supper rooms over the shops, accessible to the dress circle, with a balcony over the pavement.

The King's Theatre was opened on 27 September 1904. It was also commonly known as the Dalkeith Opera House, in reference to the owner, James Gallop of (the suburb of) Dalkeith. The large, two storey, theatre building was designed to accommodate 1,200 people. The venue was used by a range of promoters presented live performances from concerts, pantomime, plays to follies featuring singers, dancers, musical and acrobatic numbers. It was also used to screen films and as a boxing venue.

The King's Theatre was used during World War I by a repertory group known as the Black Butterflies.

The building still stands with its rendered brick, decorative cornice, stuccoed parapet and pediment. The theatre had a sliding roof, a large fly system and twelve dressing rooms. The street frontage is now given over to shops.

In 1991 the venue was opened as Metropolis Concert Club Fremantle, in 2002 following extensive renovations the club was re-opened as Metropolis Fremantle.

In December 2015, Adam Ryan Kennedy, a bouncer working at the club, placed a patron into a chokehold and hit his head against a wall while unconscious. He was sentenced to an eight-month suspended prison term and a $5000 fine.

== See also ==
- Metro City Concert Club
