= Teknoscape =

Australian electronic dance music website

- Website type: Online music community
- Available in: English
- Dissolved: May 2013
- Owner: Petar Ceklic
- Website: Archived website
- Commercial: no
- Launched: 1996

Teknoscape was an Australian electronic dance music (EDM) website and online community, active from 1996 to 2013. Based in Perth, Western Australia, it became one of the country’s longest-running dedicated EDM platforms and played a significant role in documenting, promoting, and connecting the state’s electronic music scene.

== History ==
Teknoscape was founded in 1996 by Petar Ceklic, who was a teenager at the time. The platform was created to provide structure and communication to the emerging underground electronic dance music scene in Western Australia, which was largely unstructured at the time.

Ceklic operated the site with help from the community for over 17 years before its permanent closure in May 2013.

== Content and features ==
Teknoscape functioned as an online hub for Perth’s electronic music community, including forums, artist features, news, event listings, and photo galleries.

The site’s event calendar and promotion tools ensured community members had a reliable, single point of reference for local electronic music events. It promoted shows, DJ performances, and large-scale parties in the Perth area, linking independent promoters, venues, and artists to its community.

While EDM was the site’s primary focus, it also promoted a broad range of genres. For example, its 2004 Christmas Party at Heat Nightclub included rooms dedicated to House, Techno, Trance, Breaks (including live sets by The Scratch Foundation and 8 Ball), and Hip Hop.

== Forums and community ==
The general discussion forum, nicknamed The Couch, was the most active section of the site. By the time of the closure announcement in May 2013, The Couch contained approximately 27,403 threads and 1,972,979 posts.

The forums served as a cultural commons for Perth’s EDM scene, aggregating conversations, critiques, jokes, and arguments. User tributes following the closure reflected deep reliance on the platform, with one comment describing Teknoscape as “a slightly odd part of my life for a long time.”

== Legacy ==
Upon closure, Ceklic cited hosting costs and shifting ad revenue to Facebook as key reasons for shutting down the site.

Teknoscape’s 17-year operation established it as a foundational part of Perth’s EDM community, providing both digital infrastructure and career development opportunities for its founder, who later became a freelance UI/UX designer.

== See also ==
- Rave culture
- Breakbeat
- Drum and bass
- Trance music
- Pendulum (drum and bass band)
- Greg Packer (musician)
- X-Press Magazine
- Perth Dance Music Award
