= Polarization-division multiple access =

Polarization-division multiple access (PDMA) is a channel access method used in some cellular networks and broadcast satellite services. Separate antennas are used in this type, each with different polarization and followed by separate receivers, allowing simultaneous regional access of satellites.

Each corresponding ground station antenna needs to be polarized in the same way as its counterpart in the satellite. This is generally accomplished by providing each participating ground station with an antenna that has dual polarization. The frequency band allocated to each antenna beam can be identical because the uplink signals are orthogonal in polarization. This technique allows frequency reuse.

== See also ==
- Frequency-division multiple access
- Code-division multiple access
- Time-division multiple access
