= Greg Packer (musician) =

Australian drum and bass, hard dance, and nu-disco DJ and producer

- Also known as: Dr. Packer, DJ Greg Packer
- Born: Greg Packer; 1972 (age 53–54); Northampton, United Kingdom
- Origin: Perth, Western Australia
- Genres: Drum and bass, nu-disco, funk, soul, hard dance
- Occupations: DJ, producer, remixer
- Years active: 1989–present
- Labels: Good Looking Records, Defected, Glitterbox, Interphase Music, Mastermix, Tinted Records

Greg Packer is an Australian DJ, music producer, and remixer originally from Northampton, United Kingdom. He is best known for his pioneering role in the drum and bass and hard dance scenes in Perth, Western Australia, and later for his global success as Dr. Packer, producing nu-disco, funk, and soul-inspired reworks. Active since 1989, he has released on labels including Defected, Glitterbox, and Mastermix, and has been named Traxsource’s number one Nu Disco / Indie Dance artist multiple times.

== Biography ==
=== Early life ===
Greg Packer was born in 1972 in Northampton, United Kingdom, and moved to Perth, Western Australia, in the early 1990s. He began collecting vinyl records in 1982, spanning hip hop, electro, soul, and jazz-funk. By 1989, he was DJing and won the Western Australia Mixing Championships in 1991 and 1992. He was among the first DJs in Western Australia to play drum and bass and jungle music. In 1994, Packer toured the UK with DJs such as Carl Cox, Ellis Dee, Slipmatt, Seduction, and Sy. In 1995, he won the 'Most Popular Rave DJ' award at the Perth Dance Music Awards. Over the late 1990s and early 2000s, he won multiple awards including 'Best Mixing DJ' and 'Best Drum & Bass DJ'.

=== Career in drum and bass and hard dance ===
In the early 1990s, Packer emerged as a prominent figure in Perth's drum and bass scene. He also experimented with hard dance genres, releasing mixes that incorporated hardcore, happy hardcore, and jungle elements. Notably, his 1994 promo mix Volume 18 showcased this blend of styles. He toured the UK alongside DJs such as Carl Cox, Ellis Dee, Slipmatt, Seduction, and Sy. He also performed sets featuring hard breaks and stompers, reflecting his engagement with the harder edges of dance music.

Packer has been a central figure in shaping Perth's electronic music culture. He regularly performed at events across the city, including jungle, rave classics, hard dance, and drum and bass nights. He was recognized multiple times at the Perth Dance Music Awards, cementing his influence on the local scene. He also hosted live sets and DJ mixes on platforms such as Mixcloud and SoundCloud.

=== Transition to nu disco as Dr. Packer ===
In 2013, Packer shifted focus to soul, funk, and disco, adopting the alias Dr. Packer. He began creating edits and remixes of classic tracks, leading to the creation of his own label. His work was featured by DJs such as Greg Wilson, Dimitri from Paris, and Joey Negro. He became Traxsource’s #1 Nu Disco / Indie Dance Artist for 2017, 2018, and 2021, and was named Australian Producer of the Year in 2020.

Packer has performed internationally, including the UK and Europe. His remixes have been played on international radio shows, including his monthly resident program on Street Sounds Radio, featuring disco, house, electro, and re-edits.

== Career timeline ==
- 1982 – Began collecting vinyl records, including hip hop, electro, soul, and jazz-funk.
- 1989 – Started DJing in Perth, Western Australia.
- 1991 – Won Western Australia Mixing Championships.
- 1992 – Won Western Australia Mixing Championships (second consecutive year).
- 1994 – UK tour alongside Carl Cox, Ellis Dee, Slipmatt, Seduction & Sy; released Volume 18 promo mix.
- 1995 – Won Most Popular Rave DJ at Perth Dance Music Awards.
- Late 1990s – Early 2000s – Multiple Perth Dance Music Awards for Best Mixing DJ and Best Drum & Bass DJ.
- 2013 – Transitioned to Nu Disco; adopted alias Dr Packer.
- 2017–2018 – Traxsource #1 Nu Disco / Indie Dance Artist.
- 2020 – Named Australian Producer of the Year.
- 2021 – Traxsource #1 Nu Disco / Indie Dance Artist.

== Awards and recognition ==
Major awards and recognitions for Greg Packer / Dr. Packer
Year	Award	Category	Result	Notes
1991	Western Australia Mixing Championships	Winner	Gold Medal	First major DJ competition win
1992	Western Australia Mixing Championships	Winner	Gold Medal	Back-to-back champion
1995	Perth Dance Music Awards	Most Popular Rave DJ	Winner	Recognized in Perth scene
Late 1990s	Perth Dance Music Awards	Best Mixing DJ	Winner	Multiple wins
Early 2000s	Perth Dance Music Awards	Best Drum & Bass DJ	Winner	Multiple wins
2017	Traxsource Nu Disco / Indie Dance	#1 Artist	Winner	International recognition under Dr Packer alias
2018	Traxsource Nu Disco / Indie Dance	#1 Artist	Winner	
2020	Australian Producer of the Year	Producer of the Year	Winner	Under Dr Packer alias
2021	Traxsource Nu Disco / Indie Dance	#1 Artist	Winner	

== Selected discography ==
=== Albums ===
- Dr Packer’s Different Strokes (2018) – Reworks of soulful house and disco standards, released on Glitterbox Recordings
- The DJ Set: Dr Packer Volume 1 (2022) – DJ mix compilation released by Mastermix

=== Singles and EPs ===
- "I Want To Thank You" (Dr Packer Re-Edit) – Rework of LaTrece’s classic track.
- "Dr Beat" (Dr Packer Remix) – Remix of Gloria Estefan’s hit.
- "Keep It Coming" – Nu-disco release under Dr Packer alias.
- "People’s Music" – Featured on LTJ Bukem’s FabricLive.46 compilation
- "Elusive" (Greg Packer Remix) – Drum and bass remix
- "Volume 18" (1994) – Hard dance / happy hardcore / jungle promo mix.

=== Compilations ===
- Glitterbox: Dr Packer’s Different Strokes Vol. 2 (2019) – Compilation of reworks released on Defected Records
