= Future Entertainment =

Music entertainment company

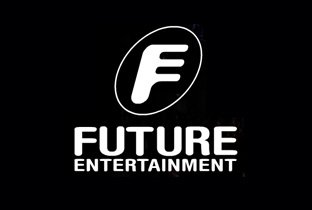
Logo

Future Entertainment is a Melbourne based, youth-focused electronic music entertainment company created by dance-music event organiser Mark James in 1993. Its objective was to present annual music festivals at Australian venues and landmarks.

The Mansion nightclub in Melbourne was the foundation of Future Entertainment, where Mark James & Jason Ayoubi first came together to form their music promotions company. The company has been developing domestic brands as a key focus in recent years with parties such as Kiss my grass, The Future Music Festival and Mischief events.

== The company and past events ==
The company was formed at 578 Glen Huntly Rd, Elsternwick with its offices and Music studio. The company organized events such as :

- Summadayze started in Melbourne in 1998/99 and has parties in Melbourne, Gold Coast, Perth and Auckland (New Zealand). This takes place at Melbourne's Sidney Myer Music Bowl every New Year's Day.
- Welcome 2000 (The millennium party) at the Victoria docks.
- The Future Music Festival.
- The Good Life Under 18s Music Festival.
- Two Tribes a joint production of Future Entertainment and Hardware Corp.
- The Lawn Party at Sydney's Randwick Racecourse.
- Sidetracked A party at the Australian Grand Prix including DJ Carl Cox and music from The Cat Empire.

Future Entertainment events are favourites with Australian festival-goers, and frequently feature in the InTheMix 50 Awards for Most Popular Festival.

Since 2007, during the NSW and Victorian concerts, police have made repeated drug busts and laid numerous possession charges.

== See also ==
- Summadayze
- Future Music Festival

== Notes ==
- inthemix | Event Coverage | Future Music Festival @ Randwick Racecourse, Sydney (08/03/09)
- inthemix | Event Coverage | Summadayze @ Sidney Myer Music Bowl, Melbourne (01/01/07)
