= Breakfest (music festival) =

Former Australian annual music festival

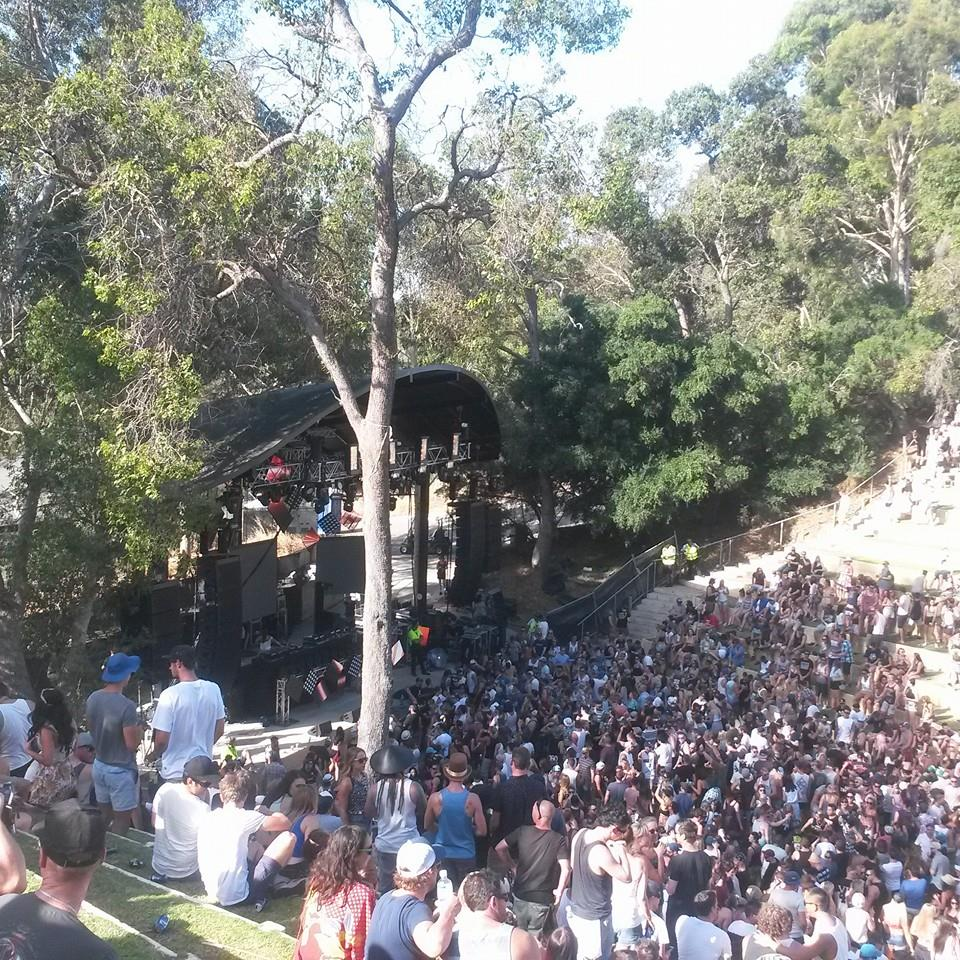
- Belvoir Amphitheatre, the iconic venue for Breakfest
- Genre: Breakbeat, Electronic music, Drum and Bass, Hip Hop
- Dates: Annually on Boxing Day (26 December)
- Location: Upper Swan, Western Australia
- Years active: 2001–2022
- Founders: Boomtick Events
- Capacity: 5,000–6,000 (approx.)
- Website: breakfest.com.au

Breakfest was an annual electronic music festival held on Boxing Day (26 December) at the Belvoir Amphitheatre in Upper Swan, near Perth, Western Australia, Australia. Founded in 2001, it became one of the country’s longest-running boutique music events, focusing on breakbeat, drum and bass, hip hop and related electronic genres. Organised by Perth-based promoter Boomtick Events, the festival maintained a single-stage format with a capped audience of around 5,000–6,000 to preserve its boutique atmosphere.

== History ==
Breakfest was first held in 2001, coinciding with the global peak of breakbeat music and a growing local scene in Perth. The Boxing Day scheduling established it as an annual cultural tradition. Early growth was rapid, with attendance increasing from around 1,400 in 2001 to 4,500 by 2003.

The festival hosted international pioneers, including Plump DJs, Stanton Warriors, Krafty Kuts, and LTJ Bukem, alongside Australian DJs and producers. Early performers also included Jessica Joy, Runaways, Nu Breed, Soundlab, Rhibosome, and Flux Capacitor.

The festival's operational model focused on curation and audience experience rather than multi-stage expansion, and it received industry recognition such as the PDMA "Best Event" award in 2003.

== Festival Features ==
- Venue: Belvoir Amphitheatre, a natural outdoor venue in Upper Swan with terraced grass seating and bushland views.
- Sound & Lighting: High-quality audio production and stage design adapted to the amphitheatre's natural acoustics.
- Audience: Capped at ~5,000–6,000 people to maintain intimacy and community focus.
- Safety and Harm Reduction: Collaborated with health services and local authorities for harm-reduction policies and peer-support staff.

== Notable Performers ==
The following is a selection of artists and DJs who have performed at Breakfest:

Performer	Notes
Stanton Warriors	Live
Krafty Kuts	Live
Plump DJs	
LTJ Bukem	
DJ Qbert	
Fun Lovin' Criminals	DJ Set
Deekline	
Kid Kenobi	
Philly Blunt	
Micah	
Beatslappaz	
Mono Lisa	
Invokers	
Pussymittens	
Break A Holics Anonymous (BAA)	
Jessica Joy	
Runaways	
Nu Breed	
Soundlab	
Rhibosome	
Flux Capacitor	

== Regulatory Challenges and Conclusion (2020–2022) ==
Breakfest's annual tradition was disrupted by the COVID-19 pandemic, with 2020 and 2021 editions cancelled due to public health restrictions.

Regulatory concerns, including crowd density and extended alcohol consumption, prevented continuation at Belvoir. Organizers chose to preserve the festival's reputation rather than compromise its experience.

== Breakfest Reunion Block Party (2025) ==
To continue the festival's legacy, Boomtick organized the "Breakfest Reunion: A Breakbeat Block Party" on 30 November 2025 in Perth's CBD at James Street and The Court. This urban format resolved logistical and regulatory challenges while maintaining the community-focused ethos.

== Legacy ==
Breakfest was one of Australia's longest-standing boutique festivals dedicated to breakbeat and related electronic genres, running annually on Boxing Day from 2001 to 2022. Following regulatory challenges that prevented its continuation at the Belvoir Amphitheatre, organizers announced the event's return in a new format, the "Breakfest Reunion: A Breakbeat Block Party," held in a Perth CBD urban venue in 2025.
