= Future Music Festival =

Former Australian annual music festival

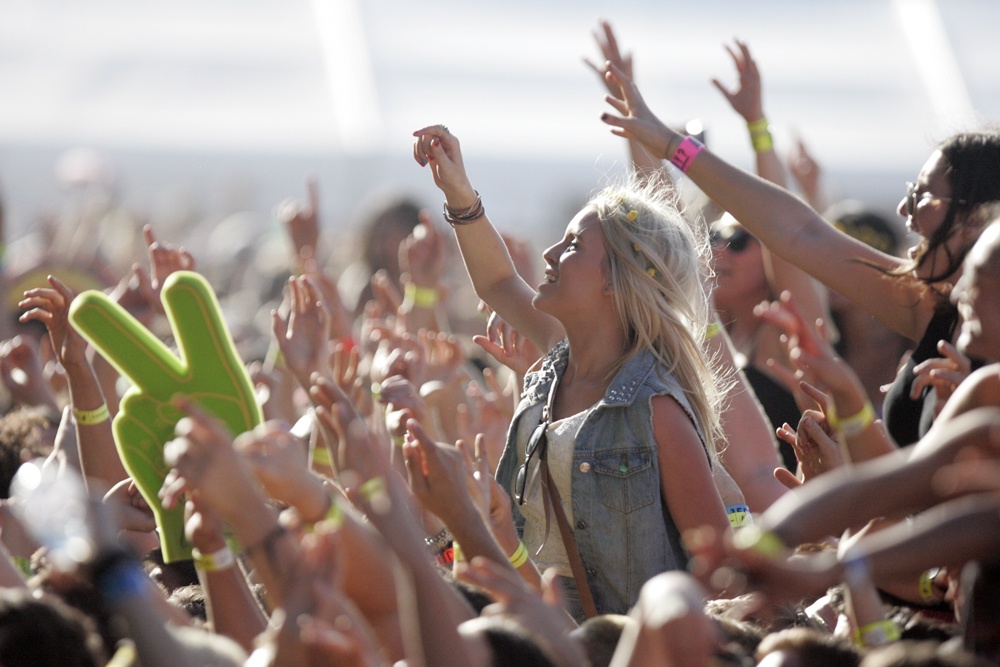
- Future Entertainment
- Genre: Electronic, dance, indie rock
- Dates: Late February – early March
- Locations: Australia: Brisbane (2007–2015); Sydney (2006–2015); Melbourne (2007–2015); Adelaide (2007–2015); Perth (2007–2015) Malaysia; Kuala Lumpur (2012–2014)
- Years active: 2006–2015
- Founders: Future Entertainment
- Capacity: Peak - 50,000 approx
- Website: futuremusicfestival.com.au

Future Music Festival was an annual music festival featuring Australian and international artists held in Sydney, Melbourne, Brisbane, Adelaide and Perth in Australia and as of 2012 also Kuala Lumpur in Malaysia. The festival was usually held in late February - early March and has been headlined by notable acts including The Prodigy, The Chemical Brothers, New Order, The Stone Roses and most recently Drake. Several weeks after the 2015 edition of the festival, Mushroom Group announced their decision to scrap any future editions of the festival due to low ticket sales.

== History ==
The festival began in 2006 as a one-day independent festival at Sydney's Royal Randwick Racecourse. In 2007 it evolved into a massive travelling festival like the Big Day Out and Soundwave which visited Brisbane, Perth, Sydney, Melbourne and Adelaide. In December 2011, Future Entertainment announced that the Future Music Festival would expand out to Asia for the 2012 festival with a show held in Kuala Lumpur, Malaysia which was headlined by The Chemical Brothers. The Asian leg of the festival has a similarity to the one in Australia with a mixture of local and international acts.

In 2014, Future Music Festival Asia in Kuala Lumpur was unexpectedly cancelled on the third day after a festivalgoer died. These were believed to be related to drug overdoses. Malaysian authorities abruptly closed the event. A year later, post-mortem results showed that six deaths at the festival had been due to heat stroke.

== Artist lineups ==
=== 2006 line-up ===
- Armin Van Buuren
- Markus Schulz
- Kai Tracid
- Technasia (live)
- Pee Wee
- Jumping Jack
- Nik Fish
- Amber Savage
- Erick Morillo
- David Guetta
- Steve Angello
- Tocadisco
- Ben Morris
- Goodwill
- Shamus
- Ali B
- Lee Coombs
- Dylan Rhymes
- Kid Kenobi & MC Shureshock
- Funktrust DJs
- James Taylor
- Blackstrobe (live)
- Coburn
- Bang Gang DJs
- Sneaky Sound System
- Van She
- Max Graham
- James Lavelle
- Ben Korbel
- Daniel C
- Crispin
- Robbie Lowe
- Trix
- Husky
- Goodfella
- Johnny Rad
- Brenden Fing
- Jeff Drake
- John Glover

=== 2007 line-up ===
- Carl Cox
- Ferry Corsten
- Felix Da Housecat
- Nick Warren
- X-Press 2
- LTJ Bukem & MC Conrad
- Tom Novy
- Fedde Le Grand
- Josh Wink
- Princess Superstar
- The Egg (LIVE)
- Chris Lake
- Sander Van Doorn
- Rex The Dog (LIVE)
- Joachim Garraud
- DJ Falcon
- Serge Santiago
- Sebastien Leger
- Bassbin Twins
- JDS
- Ali b
- Infusion (LIVE)
- Midnight Juggernauts (LIVE)
- TV Rock
- Riot in Belgium
- Bang Gang DJs
- John Course
- Dirty South
- Goodwill
- Oliver Huntemann

=== 2008 line-up ===
| | Brisbane | Perth | Sydney | Melbourne | Adelaide |
|---|---|---|---|---|---|
| The Chemical Brothers | Yes | Yes | Yes | Yes | Yes |
| John Digweed | Yes | Yes | Yes | Yes | Yes |
| Sven Vath | Yes | Yes | Yes | Yes | Yes |
| Roger Sanchez | Yes | Yes | Yes | Yes | Yes |
| Eddie Halliwell | Yes | Yes | Yes | Yes | Yes |
| Shapeshifters | Yes | Yes | Yes | Yes | Yes |
| WhoMadeWho | Yes | Yes | Yes | Yes | Yes |
| Diplo | Yes | Yes | Yes | Yes | Yes |
| Robbie Rivera | Cancelled | Cancelled | Cancelled | Cancelled | Cancelled |
| Mark Knight | Yes | Yes | Yes | Yes | Yes |
| Aesop Rock | Yes | Yes | Yes | Yes | Yes |
| Markus Schulz | Yes | Yes | Yes | Yes | Yes |
| Laidback Luke | Yes | Yes | Yes | Yes | Yes |
| Chicks on Speed | Yes | No | Yes | Yes | No |
| Datarock | Yes | Yes | Yes | Yes | Yes |
| Kid Koala | Yes | Yes | Yes | Yes | Yes |
| Elite Force | Yes | Yes | Yes | Yes | Yes |
| The Black Ghosts | Yes | Yes | Yes | Yes | Yes |
| James Holroyd | Yes | Yes | Yes | Yes | Yes |
| DJ Yoda | Cancelled | Cancelled | Cancelled | Cancelled | Cancelled |
| D.I.M | Yes | Yes | Yes | Yes | Yes |

Robbie Rivera & DJ Yoda withdrew from the 2008 lineup.

=== 2009 line-up ===
| | Brisbane | Perth | Sydney | Melbourne | Adelaide |
|---|---|---|---|---|---|
| N.E.R.D featuring Pharrell Williams | Yes | Yes | Yes | Yes | Yes |
| Basement Jaxx | Yes | Yes | Yes | Yes | Yes |
| CSS | Yes | Yes | Yes | Yes | Yes |
| Paul Oakenfold | Yes | Yes | Yes | Yes | Yes |
| Grandmaster Flash | Yes | Yes | Yes | Yes | No |
| Richie Hawtin | Yes | Yes | Yes | Yes | Yes |
| Markus Schulz | Yes | Yes | Yes | Yes | Yes |
| Etienne De Crecy | Yes | Yes | Yes | Yes | Yes |
| Steve Angello | Yes | Yes | Yes | Yes | Yes |
| Sander Kleinenberg | Yes | Yes | Yes | Yes | Yes |
| Sebastian Ingrosso | Yes | Yes | Yes | Yes | Yes |
| Stephan Bodzin Live | No | No | Yes | Yes | No |
| Joachim Garraud | Yes | Yes | Yes | Yes | Yes |
| Ian Carey | Yes | Yes | Yes | Yes | Yes |
| Christopher Lawrence | Yes | Yes | Yes | Yes | Yes |
| Tocadisco | Yes | Yes | Yes | Yes | Yes |
| Mr Oizo | Yes | Yes | Yes | Yes | Yes |
| Lifelike | Yes | Yes | Yes | Yes | Yes |
| Yacht | Yes | Yes | Yes | Yes | Yes |
| Wolfgang Gartner | Yes | Yes | Yes | Yes | Yes |
| Super8 & Tab | Yes | Yes | Yes | Yes | Yes |

No one was withdrawn from the lineup.

=== 2010 line-up ===
| | Brisbane | Perth | Sydney | Melbourne | Adelaide |
|---|---|---|---|---|---|
| The Prodigy | Yes | Yes | Yes | Yes | Yes |
| Empire of the Sun | Yes | Yes | Yes | Yes | Yes |
| Franz Ferdinand | Yes | Yes | Yes | Yes | Yes |
| David Guetta | Yes | Yes | Yes | Yes | Yes |
| Booka Shade | Yes | Yes | Yes | Yes | Yes |
| Erick Morillo | Yes | Yes | Yes | Yes | Yes |
| John Digweed | Yes | Yes | Yes | Yes | Yes |
| Sven Vath | Yes | Yes | Yes | Yes | Yes |
| Above & Beyond | Yes | Yes | Yes | Yes | Yes |
| Dubfire | Yes | Yes | Yes | Yes | Yes |
| Boys Noize | Yes | Yes | Yes | Yes | Yes |
| Does It Offend You, Yeah? | Yes | Yes | Yes | Yes | Yes |
| Spankrock | Yes | Yes | Yes | Yes | Yes |
| Way Out West | Yes | Yes | Yes | Yes | Yes |
| Operator Please | Yes | Yes | Yes | Yes | Yes |
| Bag Raiders | Yes | Yes | Yes | Yes | Yes |
| Space Invadas | Yes | Yes | Yes | Yes | Yes |
| Jump Jump Dance Dance | Yes | Yes | Yes | Yes | Yes |
| Super8 & Tab | Yes | Yes | Yes | Yes | Yes |
| Jaytech | Yes | Yes | Yes | Yes | Yes |
| Mat Zo | Yes | Yes | Yes | Yes | Yes |

No one was withdrawn from the lineup.

=== 2011 line-up ===
| | Brisbane | Perth | Sydney | Melbourne | Adelaide |
|---|---|---|---|---|---|
| The Chemical Brothers | Yes | Yes | Yes | Yes | Yes |
| Pendulum | Yes | Yes | Yes | Yes | Yes |
| Dizzee Rascal | Yes | Yes | Yes | Yes | Yes |
| MGMT | Yes | Yes | Yes | Yes | Yes |
| Mark Ronson and the Business International | Yes | Yes | Yes | Yes | Yes |
| Kesha | Yes | Yes | Yes | Yes | Yes |
| Art vs. Science | Yes | Yes | Yes | Yes | Yes |
| The Presets | Yes | Yes | Yes | Yes | Yes |
| Leftfield | Yes | Yes | Yes | Yes | Yes |
| Richie Hawtin Presents Plastikman | Yes | Yes | Yes | Yes | Yes |
| Sven Vath | Yes | Yes | Yes | Yes | Yes |
| Sander Van Doorn | Yes | Yes | Yes | Yes | Yes |
| Steve Aoki | Yes | Yes | Yes | Yes | Yes |
| Loco Dice | Yes | Yes | Yes | Yes | Yes |
| Zane Lowe | Yes | Yes | Yes | Yes | Yes |
| Cosmic Gate | Yes | Yes | Yes | Yes | Yes |
| James Holroyd | Yes | Yes | Yes | Yes | Yes |
| Steve Angello | Yes | Yes | Yes | Yes | Yes |
| Don Diablo | Yes | Yes | Yes | Yes | Yes |
| Etienne De Crecy | Cancelled | Cancelled | Cancelled | Cancelled | Cancelled |
| The Subs | Yes | Yes | Yes | Yes | Yes |
| Sound of Stereo | Yes | Yes | Yes | Yes | Yes |
| Professor Green | Yes | Yes | Yes | Yes | Yes |
| Tame Impala | Yes | Yes | Yes | Yes | Yes |
| Gypsy and the Cat | Yes | Yes | Yes | Yes | Yes |
| Zowie | Yes | Yes | Yes | Yes | Yes |
| tyDi | Yes | Yes | Yes | Yes | Yes |
| The Stafford Brothers | Yes | Yes | Yes | Yes | Yes |
| Flight Facilities | Yes | Yes | Yes | Yes | Yes |
| Binary Finary | Yes | Yes | Yes | Yes | Yes |
| Tai | Yes | Yes | Yes | Yes | Yes |
| Shazam | Yes | Yes | Yes | Yes | Yes |

Etienne De Crecy withdrew from the 2011 lineup.

=== 2012 line-up ===
| | Brisbane | Perth | Sydney | Melbourne | Adelaide | Kuala Lumpur |
|---|---|---|---|---|---|---|
| Swedish House Mafia | Yes | Yes | Yes | Yes | Yes | No |
| New Order | Yes | Yes | Yes | Yes | Yes | No |
| The Chemical Brothers – DJ Set | No | No | No | No | No | Yes |
| Fatboy Slim | Yes | Yes | Yes | Yes | Yes | No |
| Paul van Dyk | Yes | Yes | Yes | Yes | Yes | No |
| Tinie Tempah | Yes | Yes | Yes | Yes | Yes | Yes |
| The Wombats | Yes | Yes | Yes | Yes | Yes | Yes |
| Chase & Status – Live | Yes | Yes | Yes | Yes | Yes | Yes |
| Pendulum – DJ Set | No | No | No | No | No | Yes |
| Skrillex | Yes | Yes | Yes | Yes | Yes | No |
| Jessie J | Yes | Cancelled | Yes | Yes | Yes | No |
| Friendly Fires | Yes | Yes | Yes | Yes | Yes | No |
| Gym Class Heroes | Yes | Yes | Yes | Yes | Yes | No |
| The Rapture | Yes | Yes | Yes | Yes | Yes | No |
| Zane Lowe | Yes | Yes | Yes | Yes | Yes | Yes |
| Sven Vath | Yes | Yes | Yes | Yes | Yes | No |
| Aphex Twin – Live | Yes | Yes | Yes | Yes | Yes | No |
| Die Antwoord | Yes | Yes | Yes | Yes | Yes | No |
| Knife Party | Yes | Yes | Yes | Yes | Yes | No |
| Professor Green | Yes | Yes | Yes | Yes | Yes | No |
| Dubfire | Yes | Yes | Yes | Yes | Yes | No |
| The Naked And Famous | Yes | Yes | Yes | Yes | Yes | No |
| Gareth Emery | Yes | Yes | Yes | Yes | Yes | No |
| John O'Callaghan | Yes | Yes | Yes | Yes | Yes | No |
| Oliver Huntemann | Yes | Yes | Yes | Yes | Yes | No |
| James Murphy & Pat Mahony (LCD Soundsystem/DFA) | Yes | Yes | Yes | Yes | Yes | No |
| Jamie Jones | Yes | Yes | Yes | Yes | Yes | No |
| Flux Pavilion | Yes | Yes | Yes | Yes | Yes | No |
| Hercules & Love Affair | Yes | Yes | Yes | Yes | Yes | No |
| Azari & III | Yes | Yes | Yes | Yes | Yes | Yes |
| Alex Metric | Yes | Yes | Yes | Yes | Yes | Yes |
| Orjan Nilsen | Yes | Yes | Yes | Yes | Yes | No |
| Porter Robinson | Yes | Yes | Yes | Yes | Yes | No |
| Kill the Noise | Yes | Yes | Yes | Yes | Yes | No |
| Holy Ghost! | Yes | Yes | Yes | Yes | Yes | Yes |
| The Juan Maclean | Yes | Yes | Yes | Yes | Yes | No |
| Benoit & Sergio | Yes | Yes | Yes | Yes | Yes | No |
| Horse Meat Disco | Yes | Yes | Yes | Yes | Yes | No |
| The Stafford Brothers | Yes | Yes | Yes | Yes | Yes | Yes |
| Timmy Trumpet | Yes | Yes | Yes | Yes | Yes | No |
| Ruby Rose | Yes | Yes | Yes | Yes | Yes | No |
| tyDi | Yes | Yes | Yes | Yes | Yes | No |
| Grandmaster Flash | No | No | No | No | No | Yes |
| Sneaky Sound System | No | No | No | No | No | Yes |
| Cosmic Gate | No | No | No | No | No | Yes |
| Eddie Halliwell | No | No | No | No | No | Yes |
| John OO Flemming | No | No | No | No | No | Yes |
| The Potbelleez | No | No | No | No | No | Yes |
| Kid Sister | No | No | No | No | No | Yes |
| Super 8 & Tab | No | No | No | No | No | Yes |
| Andy Murphy | No | No | No | No | No | Yes |
| Shinichi Osawa | No | No | No | No | No | Yes |
| Jalebee Cartel | No | No | No | No | No | Yes |
| Nikhil Chinapa | No | No | No | No | No | Yes |
| Pearl | No | No | No | No | No | Yes |
| Pet Conspiracy | No | No | No | No | No | Yes |
| Electrico | No | No | No | No | No | Yes |
| Inquisitive | No | No | No | No | No | Yes |
| Agrikulture | No | No | No | No | No | Yes |
| Knatz | No | No | No | No | No | Yes |
| Sandwich | No | No | No | No | No | Yes |
| Good Night Electric | No | No | No | No | No | Yes |
| Project E.A.R | No | No | No | No | No | Yes |
| Kyoto Protocol | No | No | No | No | No | Yes |
| Goldfish + Blink | No | No | No | No | No | Yes |
| Twilight Actiongirl | No | No | No | No | No | Yes |
| They Will Kill Us All | No | No | No | No | No | Yes |
| Mini Compo | No | No | No | No | No | Yes |
| Enterprise | No | No | No | No | No | Yes |
| Oh! Chentaku | No | No | No | No | No | Yes |
| Bud Culture | No | No | No | No | No | Yes |
| Terence C | No | No | No | No | No | Yes |
| Victor G | No | No | No | No | No | Yes |
| Fono | No | No | No | No | No | Yes |
| Bass Agents | No | No | No | No | No | Yes |
| Phil K Lee + Ian Ross | No | No | No | No | No | Yes |

Jessie J cancelled her Perth show in 2012.

=== 2013 line-up ===
| | Brisbane | Perth | Sydney | Melbourne | Adelaide | Kuala Lumpur |
|---|---|---|---|---|---|---|
| Avicii | Cancelled | Cancelled | Yes | Yes | Yes | No |
| The Prodigy | Yes | Yes | Yes | Yes | Yes | Yes |
| The Stone Roses | Yes | Yes | Yes | Yes | Yes | No |
| PSY | Yes | Yes | Yes | Yes | Yes | Yes |
| Bloc Party | Yes | Yes | Yes | Yes | Yes | Yes |
| Dizzee Rascal | Yes | Yes | Yes | Yes | Yes | No |
| Azealia Banks | Yes | Yes | Yes | Yes | Yes | No |
| Rita Ora | Yes | Cancelled | Yes | Yes | Yes | Yes |
| Boys Noize - Live | Yes | Yes | Yes | Yes | Yes | No |
| Hardwell | Yes | Yes | Yes | Yes | Yes | No |
| The Temper Trap | Yes | Yes | Yes | Yes | Yes | Yes |
| Fun. | Yes | Yes | Yes | Yes | Yes | Yes |
| Madeon | Yes | Yes | Yes | Yes | Yes | No |
| Rudimental | Yes | Yes | Yes | Yes | Yes | Yes |
| Ellie Goulding | Yes | Yes | Yes | Yes | Yes | No |
| Steve Aoki | Yes | Yes | Yes | Yes | Yes | No |
| Gypsy & The Cat | Yes | Yes | Yes | Yes | Yes | No |
| A-Trak - Live | Yes | Yes | Yes | Yes | Yes | No |
| Kill The Noise | Yes | Yes | Yes | Yes | Yes | Yes |
| Feed Me - Live | Yes | Yes | Yes | Yes | Yes | Yes |
| Zeds Dead | Yes | Yes | Yes | Yes | Yes | Yes |
| DJ Fresh | Cancelled | Cancelled | Cancelled | Cancelled | Cancelled | Cancelled |
| Nervo | Yes | Yes | Yes | Yes | Yes | No |
| Zane Lowe | Yes | Yes | Yes | Yes | Yes | No |
| Borgore | Yes | Yes | Yes | Yes | Yes | Cancelled |
| The Stafford Brothers & Timmy Trumpet | Yes | Yes | Yes | Yes | Yes | Yes |
| Tenzin | Yes | Yes | Yes | Yes | Yes | Yes |
| Bombs Away | Yes | Yes | Yes | Yes | Yes | No |
| Sven Väth | Yes | Yes | Yes | Yes | Yes | No |
| Richie Hawtin | Yes | Yes | Yes | Yes | Yes | No |
| Ricardo Villalobos | Yes | Yes | Yes | Yes | Yes | No |
| Seth Troxler | Yes | Yes | Yes | Yes | Yes | No |
| Magda | Cancelled | Yes | Yes | Yes | Yes | No |
| Cosmic Gate feat Emma Hewitt | Yes | Yes | Yes | Yes | Yes | No |
| W&W | Yes | Yes | Yes | Yes | Yes | No |
| tyDi | Yes | Yes | Yes | Yes | Yes | No |
| Andy Moor | Yes | Yes | Yes | Yes | Yes | No |
| Super8 & Tab | Yes | Yes | Yes | Yes | Yes | No |
| Ben Gold | Yes | Yes | Yes | Yes | Yes | No |

Avicii cancelled his first weekend of the festival. The same went for Rita Ora and Magda. Also, DJ Fresh withdrew from the 2013 lineup. Borgore did not go to Malaysia at that time for the festival.

=== 2014 line-up ===
Deadmau5 - Macklemore & Ryan Lewis -Pharrell Williams - Phoenix - Hardwell - Knife Party - Eric Prydz - Rudimental - Tinie Tempah - Chase & Status - Sub Focus - Netsky - 2 Chainz - Kaskade - Dada Life - Porter Robinson - Naughty Boy - Paul van Dyk - Markus Schulz - ATB - Chuckie - Arty - R3Hab - Martin Garrix - Baauer - Monsta - Helena - Adventure Club - Carnage - Bassjackers - Deniz Koyu - Dannic - Dyro - Cut Copy - Stafford Brothers - Timmy Trumpet - Walden - Tenzin - Will Sparks - Sven Vath - Dubfire* - Maya Jane Coles* - Paul Kalkbrenner* - Gesaffelstein Live - Brodinski - Kaytranada* - Gorgon City - Guy Gerber*

=== 2015 line-up ===
Drake - Avicii - Knife Party - The Prodigy - Afrojack - Martin Garrix - Timmy Trumpet - Nero - Darude - Example - Die Antwoord - Sigma - 2 Chainz - Kiesza - Tchami - Blasterjaxx - Robin Schulz - Klingande - Gorgon City - Carnage - Bassjackers - Yellow Claw - Throttle - Cocoon presents Sven Väth - Art Department - Apollonia : Shonky - Dan Ghenacia - Dyed Soundorom - Hilltop Hoods -

== See also ==
- Future Music Festival Asia
- Future Entertainment
- Summadayze
- List of electronic music festivals
