= Perth Dance Music Awards =

Australian electronic music award

- Awarded for: Excellence in Perth's dance music scene
- Venue: The Court Hotel, The Rosemont Hotel
- Country: Australia
- Hosted by: Various (often local DJs and personalities)
- Status: Inactive
- Established: 1998
- First award: 1998
- Final award: 2013

The Perth Dance Music Awards (PDMAs) were annual awards held between 1998 and 2013 to recognise achievements in electronic dance music by artists, DJs, promoters, and venues in Western Australia. Recipients were voted for by the public across numerous categories, with the final ceremony held in 2013.

== Winners by year ==
=== 2013 ===
Category	Winner
Best House DJ	Manimal
Best Tech House DJ	Flex
Best Electro DJ	Kill Dyl
Best Techno DJ	Craig Hollywood
Best Progressive DJ	Jason Creek
Best Trance DJ	Illuminor
Best Dubstep DJ	Killafoe
Best Drum n Bass DJ	VLTRN
Best Breaks DJ	Philly Blunt
Best Hip Hop DJ	Angry Buda
Best Female DJ	Gracie
Best Hard Dance DJ	Rinski
Best Hardcore DJ	DJ Ol Bill
Best Commercial Club DJ	Timbee
Best Regional DJ	Panda
Best New Talent	Maker
Best MC	Stylee
Best Producer	Philly Blunt
Best Local Tune	Philly Blunt – "True Love" (Philly Blunt remix)
Best Record Label	JD4D Records
Best Club Night	Japan 4
Best Hardstyle DJ	Outtacontrol
Best Nightclub	Ambar
Best Radio Show	Full Frequency
Best Event	Breakfest
Best Flyer	Breakfest 2012 (Jarrod Fuller & Boomtick)
Best Scene Photograph	Adam Mazur – A$AP Rocky at Metro City Concert Club
Outstanding Contribution	Inhibit
Hall of Fame	Jeremy Junk; John “Gully” Rodgers; Petar Ceklic

=== 2012 ===
Category	Winner
Best House DJ	El Dario
Best Tech-House DJ	Flex
Best Electro DJ	Kill Dyl
Best Techno DJ	Craig Hollywood
Best Dubstep DJ	JD4D
Best Drum & Bass DJ	Voltron
Best Hip-Hop DJ	Angry Buda
Best Urban/R&B DJ	Angry Buda
Best Female DJ	Gracie
Best Breaks DJ	Micah
Best Progressive DJ	Jason Creek
Best Trance DJ	GeRmAn
Best Hardcore DJ	Camzor
Best Hardstyle DJ	Outtacontrol
Best Hard Dance DJ	Damien Blaze
Best New Talent	Poseidon
Best MC	MC Assassin
Best Live Act	The Brow Horn Orchestra
Best Producer	Killafoe
Best Local Tunes	Black & Blunt – "Moving Music"; Illuminor – "That Way" (Genix Dub Mix)
Best Record Label	JD4D Records
Best Club Night	Amon Vision
Best Nightclub	Ambar
Best Radio Show	Full Frequency (RTRFM)
Best Dance Music Website	Teknoscape
Best Event	Breakfest
Best Flyer	Amon Vision (designed by Igor Kadic)
Best International Performance	James Zabelia
Best Photo	Adam Mazur – Breakfest
Outstanding Contribution	Inhibit

=== 2011 ===
Category	Winner
Best House DJ	DJ Timbee
Best Tech-House DJ	Flex
Best Electro DJ	Kill Dyl
Best Techno DJ	Craig Hollywood
Best Dubstep DJ	Dr Space
Best Drum & Bass DJ	ShockOne
Best Hip-Hop DJ	Angry Buda
Best Urban/R&B DJ	DJ Skooby
Best Female DJ	Mono Lisa
Best Breaks DJ	Micah
Best Progressive DJ	Progress Inn
Best Trance DJ	Jason Creek
Best Hardcore DJ	DJ Ol Bill
Best Hard Dance DJ	Zimma
Best New Talent	MR.eD
Best MC	MC Assassin
Best Live Act	The Brow Horn Orchestra
Best Producer	ShockOne
Best Local Tune	"Crucify Me" – ShockOne feat. Phetsta
Best Record Label	Amon Vision
Best Club Night	Japan 4
Best Regular Weeknight	Beat Mash
Best Nightclub	Ambar
Best Radio Show	Full Frequency (RTRFM)
Best Dance Music Website	Teknoscape
Best Event	Breakfest
Best Flyer	Breakfest (designed by Jarrod Fuller)
Best International Performance	Nero
Best Photo	Atomic Hooligan & Rico Tubbs at Breakfest – James Gifford
Outstanding Contribution	Habitat

=== 2010 ===
Category	Winner
Best House DJ	Paul Scott
Best Tech-House DJ	Nathan Francis
Best Electro DJ	Kill Dyl
Best Techno DJ	Aarin F
Best Dubstep DJ	Rekab
Best Drum & Bass DJ	ShockOne
Best Hip-Hop DJ	Angry Buda
Best Urban/R&B DJ	DJ Skooby
Best Female DJ	Mono Lisa
Best Breaks DJ	Micah
Best Progressive DJ	Progress Inn
Best Trance DJ	Jason Creek
James H Trophy – Best Hardcore DJ	Rousa
Best Hard Dance DJ	Rousa
Best New Talent	The Pearly Whites
Best MC	Whiskey
Best Live Act	The Brow Horn Orchestra
Best Hip-Hop Act	The Brow Horn Orchestra
Best Producer	ShockOne
Best Local Tune	"True Believer" – ShockOne, Phetsta & Metrik (Phetsta’s Dubstep Rework)
Best Record Label	Grits n Gravy
Best Club Night	Japan 4
Best Regular Weeknight	Beat Mash
Best Nightclub	Ambar
Best Radio Show	Full Frequency (RTRFM)
Best Dance Music Website	Teknoscape
Best Event	Breakfest
Best All-Ages Event	Glow
Best International Performance	Miles Dyson
Outstanding Contribution	Knowledge Music
Best Scene Photograph	Andy C at Heavyweight Soundz – Angela King
Best Flyer	Lucid Dreaming (designed by Igor Kadic)

=== 2009 and Earlier ===
Summaries of winners from 1998 through 2009 are available in the article’s historic listings. Notable recurring winners include:

- Best Club Night – Japan 4
- Best Nightclub – Ambar
- Best Radio Show – Full Frequency (RTRFM)
- Best Event – Breakfest
- Recurring names like ShockOne, Pendulum, Downsyde, The Typhoons prominently featured
