= Summadayze =

Australian annual music festival (1999–2013)

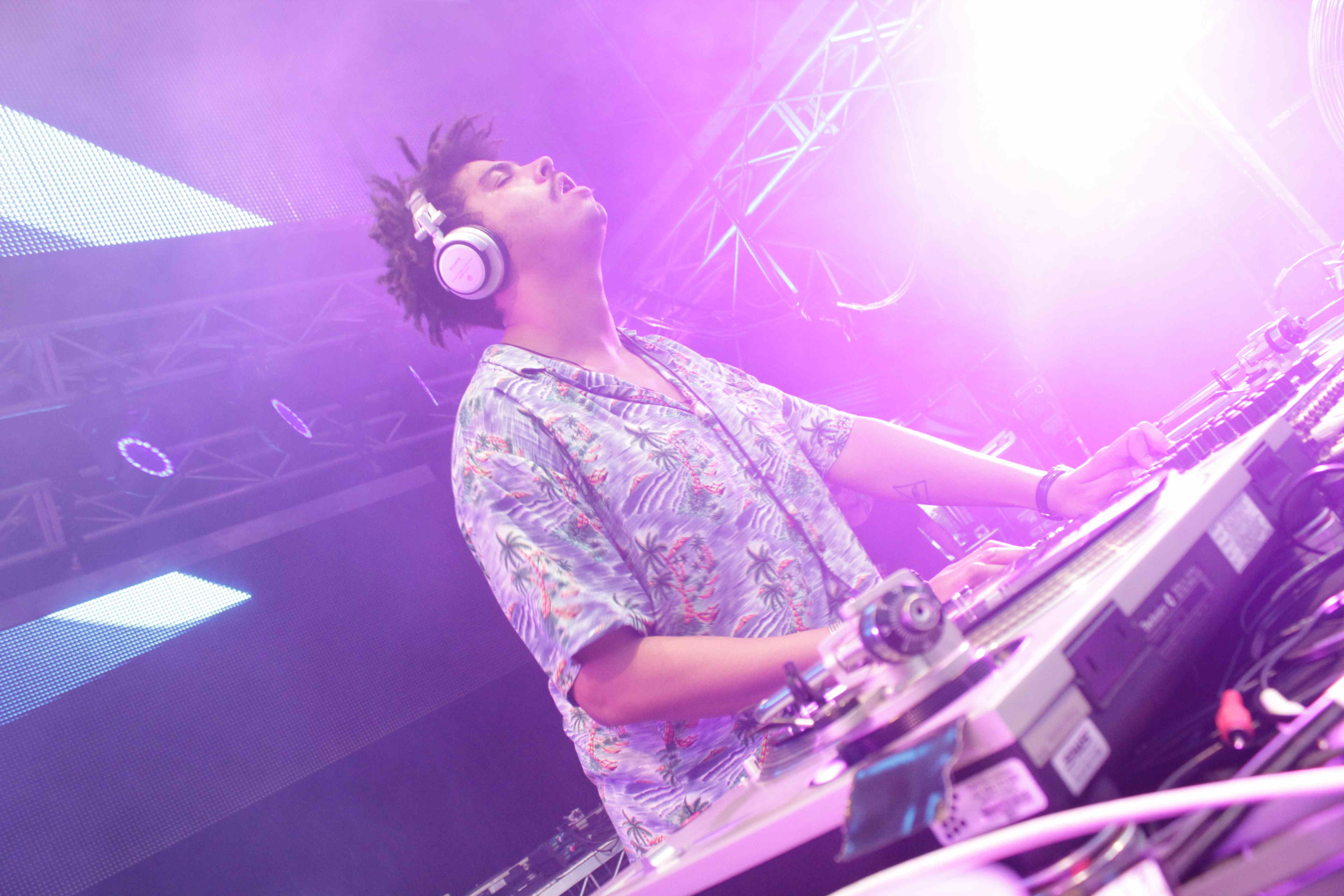
- Seth Troxler at SummaDayze 2012 in Melbourne
- Genre: Electronic music,
- Locations: Australia, New Zealand
- Years active: 1998–2013
- Founders: Future Entertainment
- Website: Summadayze

Summadayze was an annual Australian music festival held in the month of January. The first event occurred on 1 January 1999 at the Sidney Myer Music Bowl in Melbourne. It subsequently expanded into a four city festival including one in New Zealand. Summadayze was organised by Future Entertainment before it was liquidated in 2013.

Summadayze was held at Doug Jennings Park on the Gold Coast in 2003. In 2004, the Summadayze festival was held in Melbourne, Gold Coast, Auckland and Perth. The 2006 event in Melbourne saw 23,000 tickets sellout for a 15-hour event. 35 drug-related arrests were made. In 2011, events were again held in Melbourne, Adelaide, Gold Coast and Perth. The Melbourne event saw 59 people arrested on drugs charges.

== Lineups by year ==
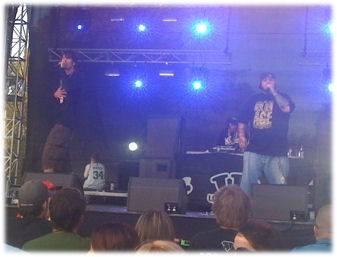
Ugly duckling at Summadayze 2010 in Adelaide

=== 2000 ===
- Derrick Carter
- Bob Sinclar
- Lo-Fidelity Allstars
- Groove Armada
- Krafty Kuts

=== 2006 ===
- Fatboy Slim
- Roger Sanchez
- Tall Paul
- Bodyrockers
- Eddie Halliwell

Bob Sinclair

=== 2008 ===
Amongst others:

- Groove Armada
- David Guetta feat Chris Willis
- New Young Pony Club
- Steve Angello & *Sebastian Ingrosso
- Felix Da Housecat
- Sister Bliss (*Faithless)
- Dave Spoon
- Benny Benassi
- Kissy Sell Out
- Cosmic Gate
- Joachim Garraud
- Claude Von Stroke
- Mason
- Tenishia
- Infusion
- TV Rock

=== 2009 ===
- Underworld
- Ferry Corsten
- Calvin Harris
- David Morales
- Adam Freeland
- Armin van Buuren
- Digitalism (live)
- Cicada (live)
- Boys Noize
- Switch
- Steve Aoki
- Busy P
- DJ Mehdi
- Galvatrons
- Malente
- tyDi

=== 2010 ===
- Carl Cox
- The Presets
- 2manydjs
- Sharam
- Eddie Halliwell
- Infected Mushroom (live)
- Josh Wink
- LCD Soundsystem (DJ Set)
- Danny Howells
- Nic Fanciulli
- Tom Novy
- Menno De Jong
- Don Diablo
- Krafty Kuts
- Sinden
- Fake Blood
- Sebastien Leger
- The Shapeshifters
- The Ian Carey Project
- Riton
- Juan MacLean
- Treasure Fingers
- Evil Nine
- Technotronic
- Danny Tenaglia
- Roger Sanchez
- Clubfeet
- Midnight Circus
- Micah Decks N FX
- Kenny L Project
- Sketchism
- Mind Electric
- Collage

=== 2011 ===
==== Melbourne ====
- David Guetta
- N.E.R.D
- Justice
- Armand Van Helden
- Chromeo
- Bob Sinclar
- Boys Noize
- Erol Alkan
- Tinie Tempah
- Miami Horror
- Riva Starr
- Dennis Ferrer
- Claude Von Stroke
- Aeroplane
- Nervo
- Plump DJs
- So Me v. DVNO
- Yuksek
- Zombie Disco Squad

==== Adelaide ====
- David Guetta
- Bob Sinclar
- Boys Noize
- Andy C
- Miami Horror
- Claude Von Stroke
- Riva Starr
- Dennis Ferrer
- RJD2
- Killa Kella
- Nervo
- Adrian Viola
- N*E*R*D

==== Gold Coast ====
- David Guetta
- Armin Van Buuren
- Justice (DJ Set)
- N*E*R*D
- Armand Van Helden
- The Rapture
- A-Trak
- Bob Sinclar
- Chromeo
- Erol Alkan
- Art vs. Science
- Trentemoller Live
- Boyz Noize
- Dennis Ferrer
- Miami Horror
- Tinie Tempah
- Riva Starr
- Plump DJs
- Claude Von Stroke
- Jamaica
- Nervo
- Yuksek
- Aeroplane
- Zombie Disco Squad
- So Me v. DVNO

==== Perth ====
- David Guetta
- Armin Van Buuren
- N*E*R*D
- Chromeo
- Bob Sinclar
- Boyz Noize
- Erol Alkan
- Tinie Tempah
- Miami Horror
- Riva Starr
- Nervo
- Aeroplane
- Yuksek
- Zombie Disco Squad

=== 2012 ===
- Pendulum
- Snoop Dogg
- Scissor Sisters
- Moby DJ Set
- Calvin Harris
- Grandmaster Flash
- Erick Morillo
- Metronomy
- Markus Schulz
- Sasha
- Tiga
- Skream & Benga
- Busy P
- DJ Medhi
- Seth Troxler
- Stanton Warriors
- Flying Lotus
- In Flagranti
- Spank Rock
- Mighty Fools
- Jack Beats
- 12th Planet

== See also ==
- Future Music Festival
- List of festivals in Australia
- List of music festivals

== See also ==
- List of electronic music festivals
- Live electronic music
