= RTRFM =

Radio station in Perth, Western Australia

Coordinates: 31°56′06″S 115°52′19″E

- Perth; Australia
- Broadcast area: Perth, Western Australia, Australia
- Frequency: 92.1 MHz FM
- Branding: RTR 92.1 FM

Programming
- Language: English
- Format: Community Radio

Ownership
- Owner: Community radio

History
- Founded: 1 April 1977

Links
- Webcast: RTRFM.com.au
- Website: Official website

RTRFM (call sign: 6RTR) is a not-for-profit, community radio station based in Perth, Western Australia. It broadcasts 24 hours a day, on 92.1 in the FM band, and digitally at www.rtrfm.com.au, RTR2, A digital only alternative was launched in 2024. Over 400 volunteers (and approximately 10 staff) are involved with running the station.

309,000 people listen to RTRFM per month. The programming on RTRFM includes dance music, jazz, electronica, blues, classic rock, metal, indie, LGBTQIA+ news, and current affairs. Its tag is "The Sound Alternative"

== History ==
The station that would eventually become RTRFM started at the University of Western Australia. It was started on 1 April 1977, broadcasting with the callsign 6UWA. Shortly afterwards, Murdoch University got involved and the station's callsign was changed to 6UVS.

On 26 November 1990, the University of Western Australia Senate decided to close the radio station down and transmission was terminated that night. 6UVS was off the air for six months while negotiations between the university, volunteers at the station, and the Australian Broadcasting Authority were carried out. A public hearing was held, and it was determined that Universities Radio Ltd. (a joint company of University of Western Australia and Murdoch University) could become Arts Radio Ltd. with the callsign of 6RTR. The station remained based at the University of Western Australia, but independent of the University. Murdoch University remained involved through the program Murdoch Magazine (later to become Morning Magazine and now The Mag).

In 2005, RTRFM moved from its old home in the Sanders Building at the University of Western Australia to its own premises on Beaufort Street in Mount Lawley, which is where it is located today. In 2017, RTRFM celebrated its fortieth anniversary with an exhibition at the State Library, a birthday celebration Neon Picnic, a donor drive and a concert at the Perth Concert Hall in November.

The station has won multiple awards including the 2025 Tony Staley Award for Excellence in Community Broadcasting, and a 2025 Webby Winner for Best Website - Music.

== Programming ==
RTRFM programming consists of fifty different programs which cover a range of topics and music genres including indie rock, indigenous music and current affairs, music of the 1960s and 1970s, experimental music, punk and hardcore, dance and electronic music, chill wave and other genres.

Daily programs include Breakfast with Pam (hosted by Pamela Boland), Out to Lunch, Full Frequency, and Drivetime. A recently released local feature album and RTRFM feature album are chosen each week to feature across all relevant RTRFM programming.

== Events ==
RTRFM hosts a number of annual events including Neon Picnic, In the Pines, Radiothon, the Fremantle Winter Music Festival, and Courtyard Club.

=== Neon Picnic ===
RTRFM's Neon Picnic, held at the Hyde Park Amphitheatre, features a selection of local hits, both new and old. Neon Picnic is a family-friendly and free event.

=== In the Pines ===
RTRFM's 'In the Pines' event is hosted annually at the University of Western Australia's Somerville Auditorium and celebrates local music talent from a variety of different genres.

=== Fremantle Winter Music Festival ===
RTRFM established the Fremantle Winter Music Festival in 2007, which has since been held annually in multiple venues throughout Fremantle. The event showcases both well-known and up-and-coming bands from Fremantle and Perth.

=== Radiothon ===
RTRFM's major fundraiser is known as Radiothon. The event is hosted over a ten-day period in August and encourages listeners to subscribe to the station. Radiothon is kicked off each year with an Opening Party event (and in some years, also features a Closing Party event). The station relies on public donations and subscriptions as a major source of funding and has ATO DGR status for donations.

=== Courtyard Club ===
Since 2014, RTRFM and The State Theatre Centre of WA have been collaborating to organise a free concert series each year in the State Theatre Centre Courtyard. The free event runs on Friday nights in the lead up to Christmas.
