= X-Press Magazine =

Australian music and entertainment magazine based in Perth, Western Australia

- Editor: Brayden Edwards
- Categories: Music, Arts
- Frequency: Formerly weekly/fortnightly, now monthly print guide and online
- Format: Print (formerly), Digital
- Circulation: Formerly ~40,000 (weekly print)
- Publisher: Vanguard Media Group
- First issue: 21 June 1985
- Final issue: 18 May 2016 (print edition ceased, moved digital); print revived 2024 (monthly guide)
- Country: Australia
- Based in: Perth, Western Australia
- Language: English
- Website: xpressmag.com.au
- ISSN: 0817-4628

X-Press Magazine is an Australian music and entertainment publication based in Perth, Western Australia. Founded in 1985, it is a prominent street press publication focusing on local and international music news, gig guides, reviews, and arts and lifestyle content within Perth.

Historically distributed as a free weekly print publication across the Perth metropolitan area, it published listings of live music events, band interviews, and reviews of albums and performances.

== History ==
X-Press Magazine was established in 1985, with the first issue published 21 June 1985 and then weekly each Thursday. The magazine was distributed weekly, with a circulation reaching over 40,000 copies to 1,000 outlets by July 2000.

Their main competitor was The Drum, which launched in 2006 and was run by national network Street Press Australia.

In 1995, Rural Press acquired had 50% of X-Press. Later, in 2009, X-Press joined the National Street Press banner alongside other prominent Australian street press titles, though the companies remained separate. X-Press then merged with The Music in 2015, with The Music's print edition ending in Perth while X-Press continued being published.

In May 2016, X-Press Magazine ceased its weekly print edition after 30 years, transitioning to a digital-only publication.Managing editor Bob Gordon cited printing costs and the impact of social media platforms on entertainment advertising as the primary factors for the transition.

At the time of its print cessation in 2016, its publisher Joe Cipriani had also announced plans to sell the publication. In October 2023, Vanguard Media Group acquired X-Press Magazine from founder Joe Cipriani, who had retired from the business in 2017. Brayden Edwards, who had been running X-Press under a licensing agreement since 2017, continued to head the operation under Vanguard. Following the acquisition, Vanguard announced the introduction of a monthly print Gig Guide in 2024, alongside its digital platform.

=== 40th Anniversary, Book Release, and Exhibition (2026) ===
In early 2026, the publication celebrated its four-decade milestone with the release of a limited-edition, 200-page coffee table retrospective book titled Rewind: 40 Years of X-Press Magazine, authored by former editor Bob Gordon. The book launch was held on 18 March 2026 with a live showcase event featuring Western Australian musical acts at the Astor Theatre.

Following the book launch, a public archival exhibition titled X-Press Magazine: 41 Years on the Streets opened at the State Library of Western Australia on 19 June 2026. Curated by Gordon using the library's physical archive of over 1,500 print editions, the free exhibition highlighted the local artists, venues, and cultural history associated with the magazine since its initial launch in 1985.

=== Zebrahype magazine ===
During the late 2000s, X-Press Magazine published Zebrahype, a supplement targeted at a younger demographic that focused on street culture, fashion, indie music, and emerging trends in Perth. It was distributed as an insert within the main magazine and at select retail and music outlets. The publication was eventually discontinued due to financial pressures in the print media landscape.

== Impact and legacy ==
X-Press Magazine documented the Perth music and arts sectors for more than three decades. It provided an early print platform for local Western Australian bands to gain exposure through reviews, news coverage, and weekly gig guides. In the pre-digital era, the publication served as a primary source for local music subcultures and entertainment listings in Perth.

The magazine was distributed via wire stands across metropolitan retail outlets, venues, and music stores, featuring a distinctive pink masthead. Because it maintained comprehensive weekly listings of the city's nightlife and events, physical editions were often kept by readers as local cultural archives.
