= Ashley William Smith =

Australian clarinet player and academic (born 1984)

- Born: 1984 (age 41–42); Perth, Western Australia
- Occupations: Chair of Woodwind and Contemporary Performance
- Awards: Freedman Award of the Music Council of Australia. "Performance of the Year" APRA Art Music Awards.

Academic background
- Education: University of Western Australia, Yale University
- Thesis: Redefining moments: Interpreting flexible moment form in the late solo works of Franco Donatoni (2020)

Academic work
- Discipline: Music
- Sub-discipline: Clarinet Performance, Popular Music, Composition

Ashley William Smith (born 1984) is an Australian clarinet player and academic. He is the chair of woodwind and contemporary performance at the UWA Conservatorium of Music at the University of Western Australia, and a member of the Queensland-based Southern Cross Soloists.

== Biography ==
Smith was born in Perth, and went to John Forrest Secondary College (then John Forrest Senior High School). He attended the University of Western Australia, where he studied clarinet with Allen Meyer, principal clarinet of the West Australian Symphony Orchestra. After completing a Bachelor of Music with First Class Honours, Smith became a fellow at the Australian National Academy of Music in Melbourne, Victoria.

In 2010, Smith entered Yale University, where he completed a master's degree in clarinet performance under the tutelage of David Shifrin. The Music Council of Australia awarded him the prestigious "Freedman Prize" in classical music, a national award given annually. The award is sometimes called the "Genius Prize" in the popular press. Earlier in 2010, Smith won the "Other Instruments" category of the national ABC Young Performers award with a performance of Ross Edwards Clarinet Concerto.

In 2013, Smith was appointed to the University of Western Australia as artist-in-residence and lecturer in contemporary performance.

He appeared with the West Australian Symphony Orchestra in October 2014, and performed and recorded Lachlan Skipworth's Clarinet Concerto. In 2015, this was awarded "Performance of the Year" by the national APRA-AMCOS organisation in their annual "Art Music Awards".

He has appeared with the Bang on a Can Festival in Beijing, Chamber Music North, USA, Music in May, as well as regular performances in his hometown Perth International Arts Festival.

Smith serves on the board of the Perth Symphony Orchestra.

== Qualifications ==
Doctor of Musical Arts (DMA) and Bachelor of Music from the University of Western Australia. Doctoral thesis: “Redefining moments: Interpreting flexible moment form in the late solo works of Franco Donatoni”. Master of Music (Clarinet Performance) from Yale University. Fellow of the Australian National Academy of Music.

== Awards ==
- 2006/7 – Several awards at the University of Western Australia. Lady Callaway Prize, Edith Cowan Prize and the Vose Prize.
- 2009 – ANAM Concerto Competition Winner. Described in the Melbourne Age as "Ashley Smith's incandescent performance of Magnus Lindberg's 2002 Clarinet Concerto...As an apologist for contemporary music-making, let alone this concerto, you would search hard to find this young clarinettist's equal."
- 2010 – ABC Young Performers Award. Winner of the "Other Instrumental" category; finalist.
- 2012 – Music Trust of Australia Freedman Fellow.
- 2015 – APRA-AMCOS Art Music Awards "Performance of the Year". Skipworth Concerto for Clarinet with WASO.
- 2015 – Soloist on Lachlan Skipworth "Concerto for Clarinet and Orchestra", nominated for the APRA-AMCOS "Symphonic Work of the Year" at the Art Music Awards, and winner of the Paul Lowen Prize (2016).
- 2016 – Churchill Fellow "To undertake intensive contemporary bass clarinet tuition with three renowned pedagogues and self directed professional development at the Banff Centre - Spain, USA, Canada"

== Premier Works Performed ==
- William Barton Calling of the Earth (2016) With Southern Cross Soloists.
- Olivia Davies Intimate Distance (2018) With Louise Devenish, Lachlan Skipworth and Emily Green-Armytage.
- Julian Day Resound (2018) With Southern Cross Soloists.
- Perry Joyce The Frog Prince for Solo Bass Clarinet and Choir (2018). With Voyces.
- Lachlan Skipworth The Eternal (2016) with Akiko Miyazawa, Kate Sullivan, Ben Caddy, Jon Tooby and Lachlan Skipworth.
- Lachlan Skipworth Clarinet Concerto (2016) (with West Australian Symphony Orchestra)
- Ashley W. Smith Shifrin for Solo Clarinet (2019)
- Christopher Tonkin Entr'acte for Solo Bass Clarinet and Electronics.

== Published Recordings ==
- Lachlan Skipworth Clarinet Quintet / Clarinet Trio With Akiko Miyazawa, Kate Sullivan, Ben Caddy, and Jon Tooby. Lachlan Skipworth (Composer) Audio CD. Navona Records nv 6241 (2019)
- I'll Work Beside You, Teddy Tahu Rhodes and the Southern Cross Soloists. Audio CD. ABC Classics, ABC4816826 (2018)
- Psychosonata, The Works of Michael Kieran Harvey. Michael Kieran Harvey, Eugene Ughetti, Tristram Williams, Natsuko Yoshimoto, Alister Barker, Ashley William Smith, Saxby Pridmore, Arjun von Caemmerer. Audio CD. Move Records. MD 3368. (2013)
