= UWA Conservatorium of Music =

Music school at the University of Western Australia

Coordinates: 31°58′36″S 115°49′12″E

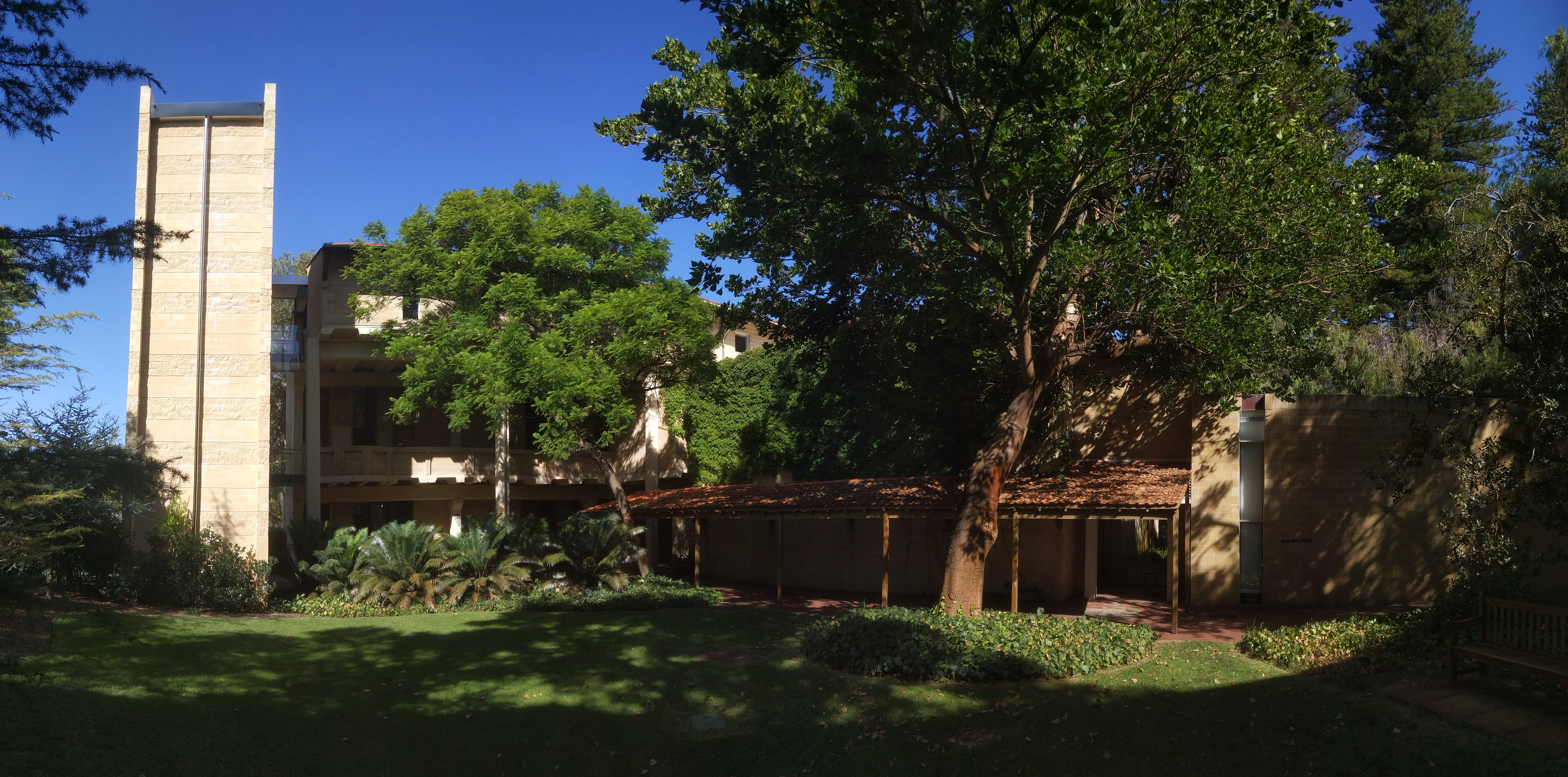
- The Conservatorium of Music, viewed from the grassy knoll in the northwest
- Former names: UWA School of Music; UWA Department of Music
- Established: 1959
- Affiliations: University of Western Australia
- Head: Dr Christopher Tonkin
- Location: Perth, Western Australia, Australia
- Website: https://www.uwa.edu.au/schools/music

The UWA Conservatorium of Music is a teaching and research school offering undergraduate and postgraduate study in music at the University of Western Australia. It is located at the north-east corner of the Crawley campus and teaches predominately Classical music, with focus in the undergraduate curriculum on performance, as well as overall strength in musicology, composition and electronic music. In 2016, UWA entered the top 100 "Performing Arts" institutions in the world, and in 2017 and 2018 the School improved its ranking to enter the top 50 in the world, according to the QS World University Rankings. The Conservatorium is also well regarded in research. Under the research code "19 Studies in Creative Arts and Writing", the Conservatorium was rated as "4 - Above World Standard" by the Australian Research Council in 2018. Previously, the name of the organisation has been the UWA Department of Music, and the UWA School of Music.

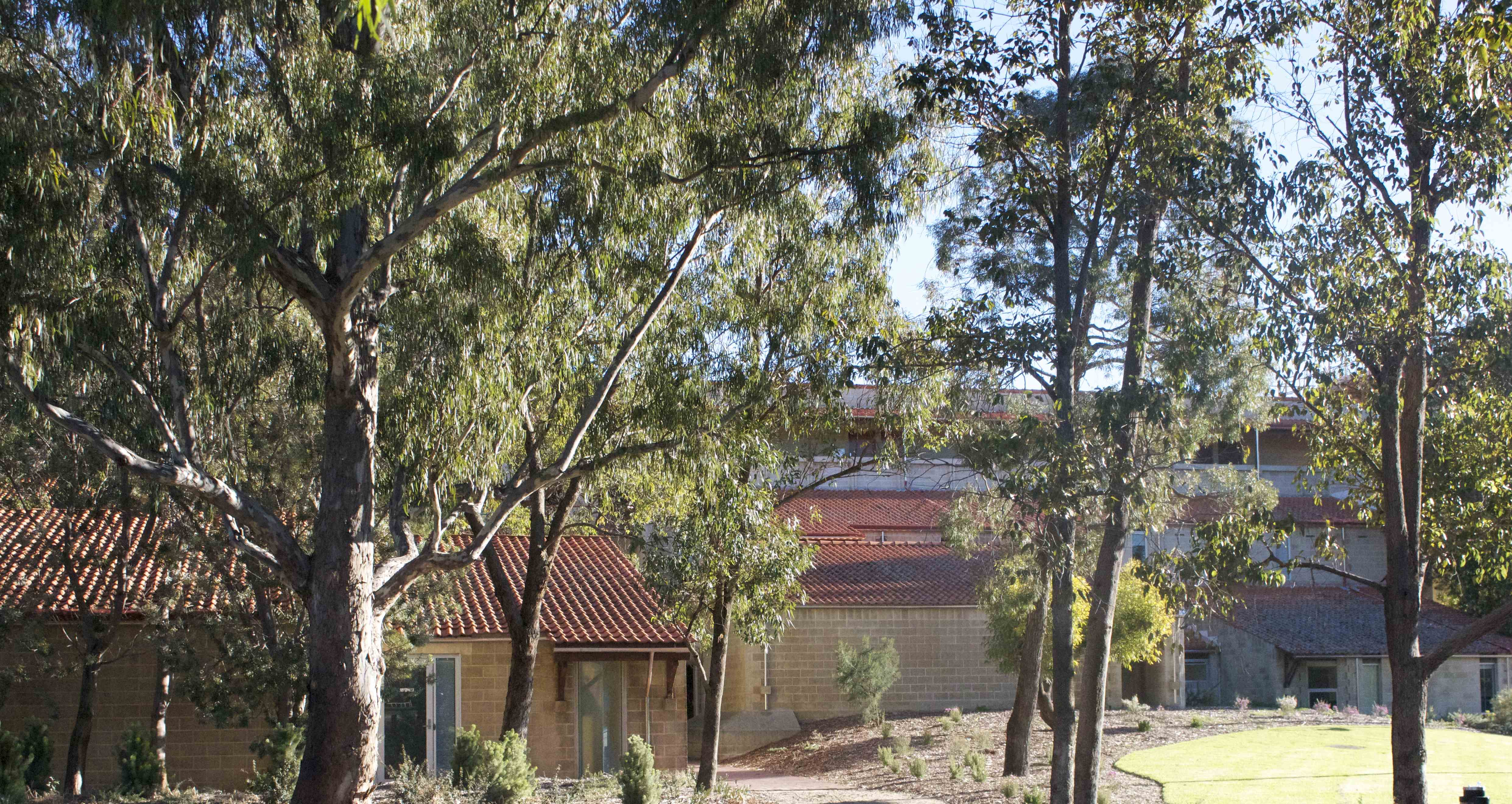
Looking towards the UWA Conservatorium of Music from the east

== History ==
The Conservatorium started life as part of the education faculty under the foundation Professor Sir Frank Callaway. It was the fourth Australian university to establish courses in music (after Adelaide, Melbourne and Sydney). The first graduates to include a significant study of music in their degrees were two Music Education students in 1957. This followed shortly thereafter with the appointment of Frank Callaway as the foundation professor, concurrently with the establishment of the department of music in 1959.

First graduates followed in 1960 (one being the noted composer Jennifer Fowler) with a BA in music, and the first graduates from the Bachelor of Music degree emerged in 1965. The first students to graduate with post-graduate qualifications emerged in 1971, and the late seventies saw the beginning of the Bachelor of Music Education - the department now having come full circle from its roots.

In 1991, the Department of Music became a School in its own right, as part of the change of structure across the university that reduced the number of faculties. On 1 November 2017, the School was officially renamed the UWA Conservatorium of Music.

== Faculty ==
The UWA Conservatorium of Music has several notable members of staff in the fields of Musicology, Performance and Composition such as Dr David Symons, Dr Chris Tonkin, Dr Suzie Wijsman, and Graeme Gilling.

In January 2012, Professor Alan Lourens was appointed Head of the Conservatorium and left in August of 2026, succeeded by Dr Christopher Tonkin.. Appointments since 2013 have included Dr Ashley William Smith as Chair of Woodwinds and Contemporary Performance, and Dr Andrew Foote as Chair of Voice.

Dr Cecilia Sun, a Fulbright scholar and protégé of Malcolm Bilson, joined the faculty in 2017 as a musicologist and performance specialist. Dr Sun, together with concertmaster of the Australian Brandenburg Orchestra Shaun Lee-Chen and celebrated vocalist Sara Macliver, founded the school’s Irwin Street Collective.

Noted composer James Ledger, appointed as a fractional full-time staff member in 2005, has increased his involvement with the school to be full-time by 2018.

In 2018, Dr Sarah Collins joined the faculty and was subsequently appointed Chair of Musicology, while Dr Paul de Cinque joined as Chair of Brass in 2019.

Dr Adam Pinto, pianist, composer and well known for his research on Roger Smalley, joined the faculty as full-time staff in 2022.

In 2020, principal percussionist with a partner West Australian Symphony Orchestra Brian Maloney became Chair of Percussion. His WASO colleagues assistant concertmaster Semra Lee, principal timpanist Alex Timpke and others teach performance students.

Former faculty include Emeritus Professor Dr Geoffrey Lancaster AM FAHA, composer Emeritus Professor Dr Roger Smalley AM FAHA, musicologist Emeritus Professor Dr David Tunley AM FAHA, Winthrop Professor Jane W Davidson, John Exton, Winthrop Professor Paul Wright, Berian Evans and Mark Coughlan. Foundation Professor Sir Frank Callaway was a leading figure in Music Education in Australia, and a former President of the International Society for Music Education.

Alan Lourens left the Conservatorium in August of 2026 and is succeeded by Dr Christopher Tonkin.

== Ensembles ==
The conservatorium has a number of important performing ensembles. The UWA Orchestra is one of Australia's notable student ensembles, with the Winthrop Singers and the Symphonic Choir offering students the opportunity to sing in chamber and large choirs. A recently re-established UWA Wind Orchestra has performed regularly across campus. The UWA Big Band is an occasional ensemble formed for special events. Of note is the recent establishment of broadenening ensembles for students whose major is not music. These ensembles range from the skilled (for students with previous musical training) to the unskilled (for those who have no experience with music).

As a signatory to the constitution of the Australian Music Education Board (AMEB), the Head of Keyboard Studies, Graeme Gilling, and Head of School Prof. Alan Lourens have held a seat on the AMEB Federal Board.

In 2012 the Conservatorium formalised its relationship with the West Australian Symphony Orchestra, with whom it has a unique tertiary partnership, which has seen UWA students performing with WASO, as well as workshops and masterclasses by WASO members and soloists on campus. This is an interesting "closing of the loop", with WASO having given very many performances (as the Perth Symphony Orchestra) on campus in Winthrop Hall in the early days of the orchestra, and in the period between 1967 and 1973 while the Perth Concert Hall was being built.

In 2017, The West Australian Opera and the UWA School of Music signed a formal Memorandum of Understanding to engage in joint masterclasses, and allow UWA students to learn from the best professionals in workshops and performances. In 2021, they jointly mounted a production of Mendelssohn's Elijah in Winthrop Hall at UWA.

Honorary Research Fellows include composers Iain Grandage, early music specialist and administrator Emeritus Professor Margaret Seares Guitarist Craig Ogden, the soprano Sara Macliver and organist and choral director Joseph Nolan

== Undergraduate courses ==
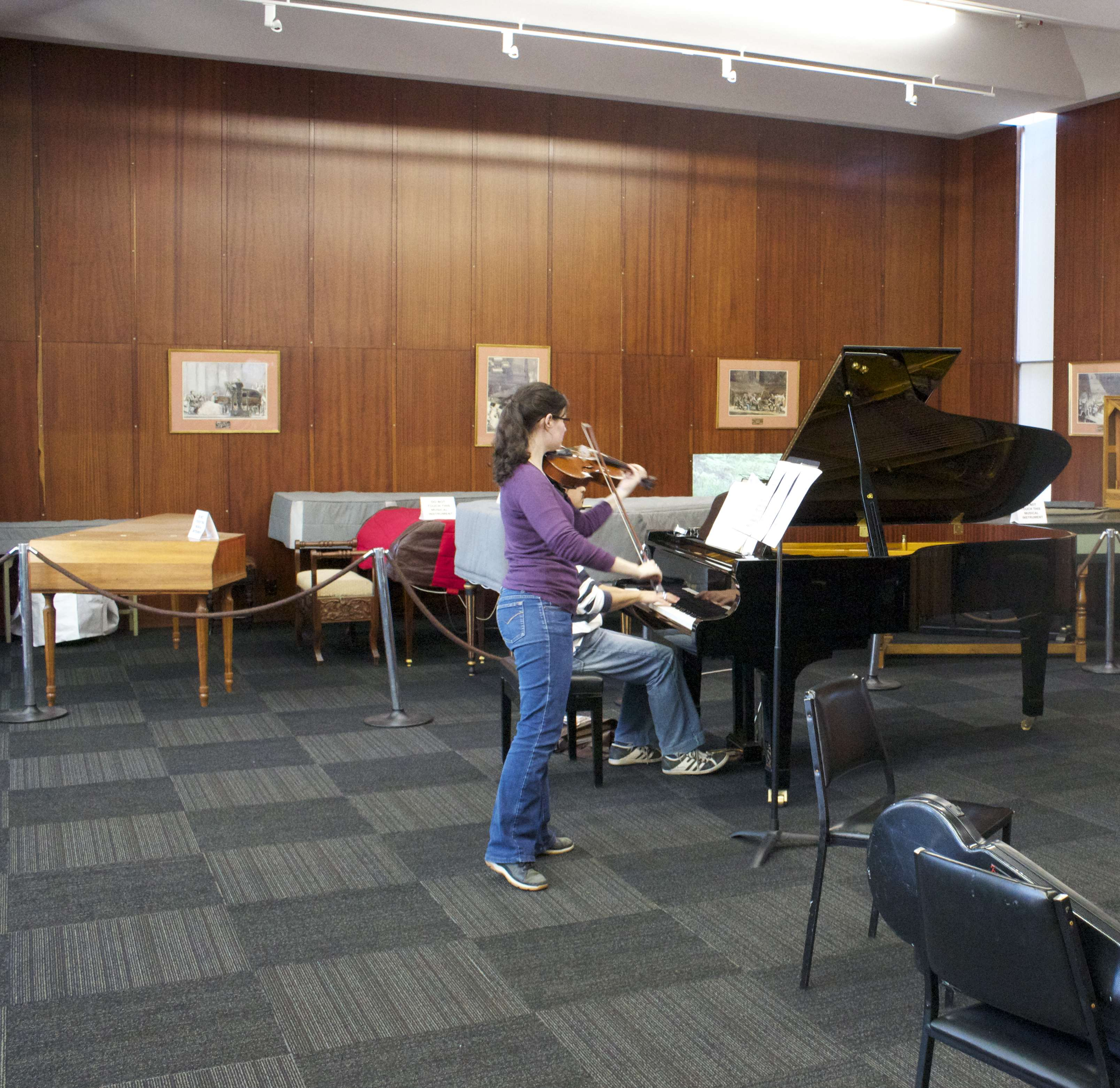
Students rehearsing in the Eileen Joyce Studio. Note the collection of historical and notable keyboard instruments behind them.

In 2012, UWA adopted a new set of standard degrees, similar to other universities in Australia who have been examining the "Melbourne Model" This requires students to take at least one major, and other related areas. In line with this model, there are six modes of study for Music at UWA.

1. The First Major in Music gives students the ability to take Music Studies, including one-on-one tuition on their instrument (or composition) for a year. Normally, students will pick up another major (often Engineering Studies, Languages or Sciences) in other parts of the university. If music is taken as a first major, the degree awarded will be a BA.
2. The Bachelor of Music degree was re-introduced for 2021. This is a Double Major in Music, and replaces the BA Dual Major in which students took Music Studies and Specialist Music Studies as their two majors. It is a performance intensive course that can also be taken composition, musicology or studio pedagogy. It is also available for students in Creative Music Technology. An audition/interview for the BMus is required.
3. Introduced in 2018, Music General Studies is designed for students with considerable music experience, who don't wish to pursue the full performance major. It is designed to be taken as a second major, and allows students to take performance units. Students in this major will take 4 units in performance, but will receive only 6 hours of one-on-one tuition on their instrument per semester. However, students make take this major in jazz and non-classical instruments. An audition is required for entry to this major. The degree awarded will be the area in which the major belongs. So, for example if English is the first major, a BA will be awarded; if Physics a BSci, or if economics a BBus or BComm.
4. Also introduced in 2018, the Electronic Music and Sound Design major can be taken as a degree specific (1st) major or a 2nd major. It focuses on the use of technology and artistic medium, and can accommodate students who have a very high level of existing musical experience, or students who have no previous musical experience. No audition is required for this major.
5. Introduced in 2024, a major in Contemporary Popular Music was introduced within the Bachelor of Arts. Normally taken in performance, the major requires an audition.
6. The Broadening units in Music are designed to give all students on campus a musical experience if they wish and are qualified to do so. Broadening units include performance options such as large ensemble in both auditioned (Orchestra, Wind Orchestra and Winthrop Singers) and non-auditioned (Show choir, Percussion ensemble) form. The non-auditioned ensembles give students who have no musical experience at all the opportunity to perform music. Also offered as Broadening units are academic studies such as History, Music Language, and Music and Science units.

In 2011, James Ledger's (member of the music faculty) work Chronicles was voted as a "Classical Masterpiece", and the best Australian Masterpiece since 2000. In 2016, The UWA Conservatorium of Music was ranked in the top 100 "Performing Arts" institutions in the world, and ranked number 1 in Australia, by the QS Top Universities Guide. In 2017, the conservatorium increased its ranking to 33rd in the world.

== Entry ==
Entry to the UWA Conservatorium of Music is a two-stage process that requires both an audition for the school, and admission to the university. Auditions are held towards the end of the year, and require students to undertake both performance and aural activities.

Admission to the university usually requires an ATAR of 75 or more. UWA does, however, offer many points of access, and non-standard admission to the university is not unusual.

== Post graduate degrees ==
The UWA Conservatorium of Music graduated its first postgraduate student in 1967, and its first PhD student in 1971. Currently, the School offers the following postgraduate qualifications:

- Master of Music
- Master of Music (Orchestral Performance) offered with tertiary partner WASO
- Doctor of Musical Arts
- Doctor of Philosophy (Music)

== Music buildings ==
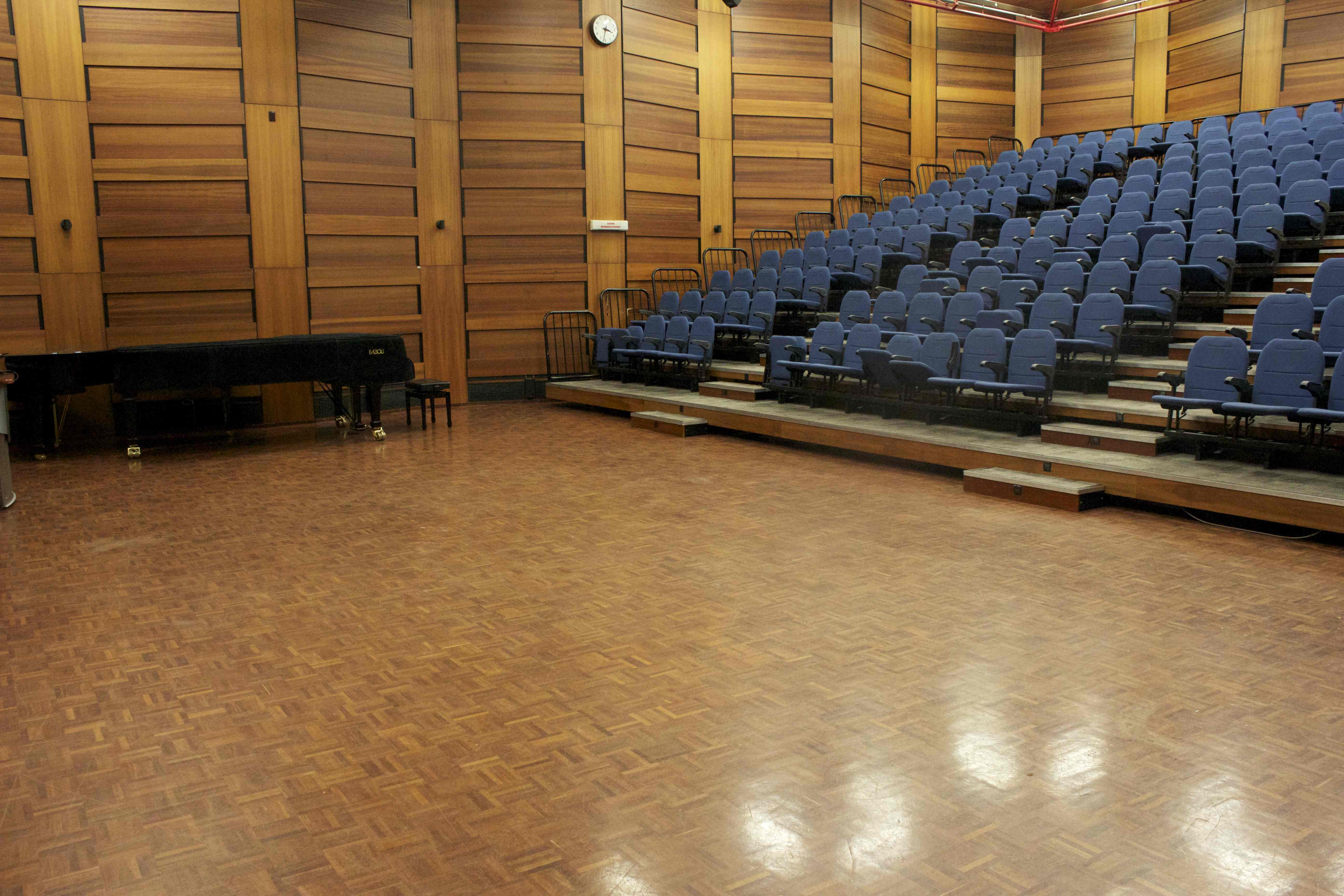
Callaway Auditorium with the seating fully extended

Located on the North Eastern corner of the Crawley campus, the Conservatorium of Music overlooks the Swan River. The current buildings were opened in 1978. In a contemporary report discussing the large number of towering pine trees in the adjacent outdoor auditorium, the architects noted "the retention of the present special qualities of Sommerville Auditorium and its unique character is considered a priority in the total solution". The most recent work (2012) has been the addition of a large elevator on the northern edge.

Within the School there are a number of specialist facilities. The Music Library, housed in the Reid Library, is one of the leading academic music collections in Australia. The Eileen Joyce studio, dedicated to the memory of one of Australia's great pianists, houses a significant collection of antique and current keyboard instruments, and is regularly used for chamber music performances. It received a considerable upgrade to the facility as part of the repair process following devastating storms in March, 2010.

The Callaway auditorium, dedicated to the foundation Professor of Music, is an oft-used small concert venue, and houses most of the large-scale lectures. The Tunley Lecture Theatre, named for a former long-serving faculty member and Head of School, is a small lecture theatre. In 2012, both the Callaway Auditorium and the Tunley Lecture Theatre received upgraded IT infrastructure to allow for lecture control from the podium, and the digital recording and broadcasting of lectures and performances.

== Notable alumni ==
- Taryn Fiebig, Soprano
- Jennifer Fowler, Noted Composer
- Iain Grandage, Composer and Director of the Perth Festival
- Dr Cat Hope, Composer & Academic at ECU & Monash University
- Dr James Ledger, Composer & Faculty Member, UWA School of Music
- Sara Macliver, Soprano
- Peter Sunman, Clarinet
- Lindsay Vickery, Composer
- Carl Vine, Composer
- Dr Ashley W Smith, Clarinetist & UWA Academic
- Dr Graham Wood, Jazz Pianist

== APRA AMCOS Art Music Award winners ==
Winners and nominees of APRA AMCOS Art Music Awards who are UWA Alumni or faculty

- 2003 Instrumental Work of the Year (Winner) - David Pye (Drummers of Gilgamesh)
- 2006 Best Performance of an Australian Composition (Nominee) - WASO performing James Ledger (Line Drawing)
- 2007 Best Composition by an Australian Composer, Roger Smalley (Birthday Tango) (Winner), Iain Grandage (The Silence) (Nominee). Best Performance of an Australian Composition (Nominee) Carl Vine (Symphony No. 2)
- 2008 Best Performance of an Australian Composition (Nominee) Carl Vine (Piano Sonata No. 3), Orchestral Work of the Year (Nominee), James Ledger Trumpet Concerto
- 2009 Best Composition of an Australian Composer (Nominee) Iain Grandage (Black Dogs). Best Performance of an Australian Composer. Carl Vine (Symphony No. 7)
- 2011 Work of the Year - Instrumental. James Ledger (Chronicles) (Winner). Award for Excellence in Music Education (Nominee), Cat Hope. Award for Excellence in Experimental Music (Cat Hope), Winner.
- 2012 Work of the Year Vocal or Choral Nominee Iain Grandage (Blackwood). Performance of the Year (Winner) James Ledger Two Memorials performed by WASO
- 2013 Work of the Year, Instrumental (Nominee), Lachlan Skipworth (Dark Nebulae). Work of the Year Orchestral (Nominee), Carl Vine, Piano Concerto No. 2. Work of the Year, Choral or Vocal (Nominee), James Ledger et al. Conversations with Ghosts. Award for Excellence by an Individual, Cat Hope.
- 2014, Work of the Year, Orchestral (Nominee) James Ledger, (Golden Years). Award for Excellence in Music Education (Nominee) Cat Hope.
- 2015, Instrumental Work of the Year (Nominee), Carl Vine (Piano Trio from The Village), Orchestral Work of the Year (Nominee), Lachlan Skipworth (Concerto for Clarinet and Orchestra) - also WON Performance of the Year, Performed by Ashley W Smith, Clarinet. Vocal/Choral Work of the Year, Iain Grandage et al., (The Riders).
- 2017, Award for Excellence by an Individual (Nominee), Cat Hope.
- 2018, Orchestral Work of the Year (Nominee), Lachlan Skipworth (Spiritus), Award for Excellence by an Individual (Winner), Carl Vine.
- 2019 Orchestral Work of the Year (Winner), Carl Vine (Implacable Gifts). Performance of the Year (Nominee), Lachlan Skipworth (Breath of Thunder).
- 2020 Chamber Work of the Year (Nominee), John Pax, Where the Quiet Rests. Work of the Year (Large Ensemble) (Winner), James Ledger Viola Concerto. Work of the Year (Dramatic) (Nominee), Cat Hope, Speechless. Performance of the Year (Notated composition)(Winner), Louise Devenish, Sheets of Sound
- 2022 Work of the Year (Large Ensemble), Olivia Davis, Stratus.
