= Lachlan Skipworth =

Australian composer

Lachlan Skipworth (born 1982) is an Australian composer based in Perth, Western Australia.

His works span across orchestral, chamber, vocal and experimental music and they are influenced by the Japanese shakuhachi and the honkyoku aesthetic.

Skipworth co-founded the new music ensemble Intercurrent in 2015, along with percussionist Louise Devenish, pianist Emily Green-Armytage and clarinettist Ashley William Smith. He also founded the chamber music collective Cygnus Arioso with his wife, violinist Akiko Miyazawa. Both ensembles are based in Perth, Western Australia.

== Education ==
Skipworth played in a wind quintet in high school, which introduced him to chamber music.

Skipworth studied at the University of Western Australia, earning a Bachelor of Music Education at the UWA Conservatorium of Music, where he studied with composers Roger Smalley and Iain Grandage and wrote his first serious compositions.

He traveled to Japan to learn shakuhachi for three years. Skipworth's main shakuhachi teachers were the revered masters Kakizakai Kaoru and Yokoyama Katsuya, and has been mentored by shakuhachi grand master Riley Lee.

In 2008, he moved to Sydney, New South Wales to study at the Sydney Conservatorium of Music (M.Mus., Ph.D.) and studied with Anne Boyd. Between 2010 and 2011, he spent two semesters in Germany undertaking a kontaktstudium at the Freiburg Hochschule fur Musik with composer and clarinettist Jörg Widmann. Skipworth graduated with a Ph.D. in composition in December 2016.

== Career ==
After winning the Paul Lowin Prize for orchestral composition in 2016, Skipworth earned a string of major commissions and appointments. The winning work, Concerto for Clarinet and Orchestra, earned the APRA Art Music Award for Performance of the Year, and was chosen by ABC Classic FM to be presented at the 2016 International Rostrum of Composers in Poland. In 2016, he was appointed composer-in-residence with the West Australian Symphony Orchestra. His work Spiritus was a finalist in the Paul Lowin Orchestral Prizes in 2019.

The International Society for Contemporary Music selected his works dark nebulae and Clarinet Quintet as the official Australian work at their World Music Days in Slovenia (2015) and Vancouver (2017) respectively.

His work has also been performed by the Queensland Symphony Orchestra, Melbourne Symphony Orchestra, New England Philharmonic, Tokyo Philharmonic Chorus.

In 2019, he collaborated with Australian indigenous singer Don Nunggarrgalu and the Darwin Symphony Orchestra.

In 2020, Skipworth was one of the composers commissioned as part of Sydney Symphony Orchestra's 50 Fanfares project.

== Psalterphone ==
Skipworth invented the psalterphone for his work The Night Sky Fall. The instrument combines the layout of a psaltery with the sound of a bowed vibraphone.

== Discography ==
Skipworth's Chamber Works vol. 2 debuted at #1 on the ARIA Top 20 Classical/Crossover Albums chart.

Album	Release date
Chamber Works	2019
Ode	2020
Breath of Thunder, Avem Asperitas and Hymns in Reverie	2020
Chamber Works, Vol. 2	2022

== Awards and nominations ==
=== ARIA Music Awards ===
The ARIA Music Awards is an annual awards ceremony that recognises excellence, innovation, and achievement across all genres of Australian music. They commenced in 1987.

Year	Nominee / work	Award	Result	Ref.
2022	Chamber Works, Vol. 2	Best Classical Album	Nominated	

=== Other awards ===
Award	Year	Work	Status	Ref.
Art Music Awards: Work of the Year, Instrumental	2013	dark nebulae	Finalist	
Art Music Awards: Work of the Year, Orchestral	2015	Concerto for Clarinet and Orchestra	Finalist	
Paul Lowin Prize, Orchestral	2016	Concerto for Clarinet and Orchestra	Won	
Albert H. Maggs Award	2017	Spiritus	Won	
Art Music Awards: Work of the Year, Orchestral	2018	Spiritus	Finalist	
Paul Lowin Prize, Orchestral	2019	Spiritus	Finalist	
Art Music Awards: Work of the Year – Chamber Music	2023	Pine Chant	Won	
