= Adam Eckersley (disambiguation) =

Adam Eckersley may refer to:

- Adam Eckersley (footballer) (born 1985), English footballer
- Adam Eckersley (musician) (born 1982), Australian singer, guitarist and songwriter

== See also ==
- Adam Eckersley Band
