= APRA Music Awards of 2015 =

Annual Australian music awards

- Date: 24 March 2015
- Location: Carriageworks, Sydney, Australia
- Hosted by: Brian Nankervis
- Website: apraamcos.com.au/awards/2015-awards

The Australasian Performing Right Association Awards of 2015 (generally known as APRA Awards) are a series of related awards which include the APRA Music Awards, Art Music Awards, and Screen Music Awards. The APRA Music Awards of 2015 was the 33rd annual ceremony by the Australasian Performing Right Association (APRA) and the Australasian Mechanical Copyright Owners Society (AMCOS) to award outstanding achievements in contemporary songwriting, composing and publishing. The ceremony was held on 24 March 2015 at the Carriageworks, Sydney. The host for the ceremony was Brian Nankervis, adjudicator on SBS-TV's RocKwiz.

The Art Music Awards were distributed on 11 August at the City Recital Hall, Sydney. These were provided by APRA, AMCOS and Australian Music Centre (AMC) to recognise "artistic achievement and excellence within the field of Australia's art music industry." The Screen Music Awards were issued on 13 November by APRA, AMCOS and Australian Guild of Screen Composers (AGSC), which "acknowledges excellence and innovation in the genre of screen composition".

On 26 February nominations for the APRA Music Awards were announced on multiple news sources, with Sheppard receiving four nominations; while Dan Sultan, Sia and Jesse Shatkin, and 5 Seconds of Summer received three each. A total of 13 awards were presented, with Fifa Riccobono honoured by the Ted Albert Award for Outstanding Services to Australian Music. Riccobono worked for Albert Music for 40 years. Sia was presented with Songwriter of the Year for the third consecutive year – the first artist to ever do so.

== Presenters ==
At the APRA Music Awards ceremony on 24 March 2015, aside from the host, Brian Nankervis, the presenters were Jimmy Barnes, Vance Joy, Kerri-Anne Kennerley and Melinda Schneider.

== Performances ==
The APRA Music Awards ceremony showcased performances by:

- Daniel Johns – "Preach"
- Lisa Mitchell and Jake Clemons
- Thief
- Penelope Austin and M-Phazes
- Jon Hume
- Mark Vincent and Julie Lea Goodwin
- Jimmy Barnes and Diesel
- Kingswood

== APRA Music Awards ==
=== Blues & Roots Work of the Year ===
Title and/or artist	Writer(s)	Publisher(s)	Result
"Dulcify" – Halfway	John Busby, Christopher Dale, Liam Fitzpatrick, Noel Fitzpatrick, Elwin Hawtin, Benjamin Johnson, Luke Peacock, John Willsteed	Native Tongue Music Publishing obo (on behalf of) Plus One Records	Nominated
"Get Home" – Angus & Julia Stone	Angus Stone, Julia Stone	Sony/ATV Music Publishing (Australia) Pty Ltd	Nominated
"Heart Beats Slow" – Angus & Julia Stone	Angus Stone, Julia Stone	Sony/ATV Music Publishing Australia P/L	Won
"Livin' in the City" – John Butler Trio	John Butler	Family Music Pty Ltd/J Albert & Son Pty Ltd	Nominated
"Window to the Sky" – Kim Churchill	Kim Churchill	Sony/ATV Music Publishing (Australia) Pty Ltd	Nominated

=== Breakthrough Songwriter of the Year ===
Title and/or artist	Writer(s)	Publisher(s)	Result
5 Seconds of Summer	Michael Clifford, Luke Hemmings, Calum Hood, Ashton Irwin	Universal Music Publishing Pty Ltd	Won
Chet Faker	Chet Faker	Mushroom Music Pty Ltd	Nominated
M-Phazes	M-Phazes (aka Mark Landon)	Universal Music Publishing Pty Ltd	Nominated
The Preatures	Gideon Bensen, Thomas Champion, Luke Davison, Isabella Manfredi, Jack Mofitt	Mushroom Music Pty Ltd	Nominated
Troye Sivan	Troye Sivan Mellet	—N/a	Nominated

=== Country Work of the Year ===
Title and/or artist	Writer(s)	Publisher(s)	Result
"Freedom Rebels" – Adam Brand	Adam Brand, Barry Dean, Troy Verges	Universal Music Publishing Pty Ltd, Universal Music Publishing MGB Australia obo Barrytones / Universal/MCA Music Publishing Pty Ltd obo Songs from the Engine Room	Nominated
"Give Her the World" – Adam Eckersley Band	Adam Eckersley, Danelle Leverett, Jason Reeves	Sony/ATV Music Publishing (Australia) Pty Ltd	Won
"Going Under (Didn't Have To)" – The McClymonts	Brooke McClymont, Mollie McClymont, Samantha McClymont, Lindsay Rimes	Sony/ATV Music Publishing (Australia) Pty Ltd	Nominated
"Here's To You And I" – The McClymonts	Stuart Crichton, Brooke McClymont, Mollie McClymont, Samantha McClymont	Native Tongue Music Publishing, Sony/ATV Music Publishing (Australia) Pty Ltd	Nominated
"One Eye For An Eye" – Morgan Evans	Morgan Evans, Mark Wells	Perfect Pitch Publishing Pty Ltd	Nominated

=== Dance Work of the Year ===
Title and/or artist	Writer(s)	Publisher(s)	Result
"Braveheart" – Neon Jungle	Cassie Davis, Sean Mullins	Universal Music Publishing Pty Ltd	Nominated
"Drop the Game" – Flume & Chet Faker	Flume, Chet Faker	Kobalt Music Publishing Australia P/L obo Future Classic Pty Ltd, Mushroom Music Pty Ltd*	Nominated
"High" – Peking Duk featuring Nicole Millar	Adam Hyde, Reuben Styles, Sam Littlemore, Nicole Millar	120 Publishing Pty Ltd	Nominated
"Swing (Joel Fletcher Remix)" – Joel Fletcher featuring Savage	Joel Fletcher, Demetrius Savelio, Nathan Holmes, Aaron Ngawhika	120 Publishing Pty Ltd, Universal Music Publishing Pty Ltd obo Dawn Raid Music Ltd	Won
"Tear It Down" – The Aston Shuffle	Kaelyn Behr, Mikah Freeman, Vance Musgrove, Amanda Ghost	Sony/ATV Music Publishing (Australia) Pty Ltd, Universal Music Publishing Pty Ltd	Nominated

=== International Work of the Year ===
Title and/or artist	Writer(s)	Publisher(s)	Result
"Happy" – Pharrell Williams	Pharrell Williams	Universal/MCA Music Publishing Pty Ltd obo Universal Pictures Music / Sony/ATV Music Publishing (Australia) Pty Ltd	Won
"Rather Be" – Clean Bandit featuring Jess Glynne	Grace Chatto, Nicole Marshall, James Napier, Jack Patterson	Sony/ATV Music Publishing (Australia) Pty Ltd / Universal Music Publishing Pty Ltd obo Salli Isaak Songs Ltd	Nominated
"Rude" – Magic!	Nasri Atweh, Adam Messinger, Mark Pellizzer, Ben Spivak, Alex Tanas	Sony/ATV Music Publishing (Australia) Pty Ltd, Kobalt Music Publishing Australia P/L obo Messy Music, Universal/MCA Music Publishing Pty Ltd obo Mark Pelli Music Inc, Kobalt Music Publishing Australia P/L obo Kobalt Music Services America Inc, Mushroom Music Pty Ltd obo BMG Chrysalis	Nominated
"Stay with Me" – Sam Smith	Sam Smith, James Napier, William Phillips, Tom Petty, Jeff Lynne	Sony/ATV Music Publishing (Australia) Pty Ltd, Universal Music Publishing Pty Ltd obo Salli Isaak Songs Ltd, Universal Music Publishing Pty Ltd obo Gone Gator Music, Universal Music Publishing Pty Ltd obo Method Paperwork Ltd	Nominated
"The Monster" – Eminem featuring Rihanna	Marshall Mathers, Bryan Fryzel, Bleta Rexha, Aaron Kleinstub, Maki Athanasiou, Robyn Fenty, Jon Bellion	Universal/MCA Music Publishing Pty Ltd Obo Shroom Shady Music, J Albert and Son Pty Ltd obo Art In The Fodder Music and Songs of a Beautiful Mind, Sony/ATV Music Publishing (Australia) Pty Ltd, Universal/MCA Music Publishing Pty Ltd obo Freq Show Music, Mushroom Music Pty Ltd obo BMG Chrysalis, Mushroom Music Pty Ltd obo BMG Chrysalis	Nominated

=== Most Played Australian Work ===
Title and/or artist	Writer(s)	Publisher(s)	Result
"Chandelier" – Sia	Sia Furler, Jesse Shatkin	Sony/ATV Music Publishing (Australia) Pty Ltd	Nominated
"Geronimo" – Sheppard	Jason Bovino, Amy Sheppard, George Sheppard	Mushroom Music Pty Ltd obo Empire of Song (Australia) Pty Ltd	Won
"Like a Drum" – Guy Sebastian	Guy Sebastian, Romain Lorenzo, Sam Martin, David Harris	Universal Music Publishing Pty Ltd, Peace Pourage Music, Warner/Chappell Music Australia Pty Ltd obo Quinleez Music and Artist 101 Publishing Group, Warner/Chappell Music Australia Pty Ltd obo Sam Martin Music Publishing and Artist Publishing Group West	Nominated
"She Looks So Perfect" – 5 Seconds of Summer	Michael Clifford, Ashton Irwin, Jacob Sinclair	Sony/ATV Music Publishing (Australia) Pty Ltd, Mushroom Music Pty Ltd obo BMG Chrysalis	Nominated
"Swing (Joel Fletcher Remix)" – Joel Fletcher	Joel Fletcher Allan, Demetrius Savelio, Nathan Holmes, Aaron Ngawhika	120 Publishing Pty Ltd, Universal Music Publishing Pty Ltd obo Dawn Raid Music Ltd	Nominated

=== Most Played Australia Work Overseas ===
Title and/or artist	Writer(s)	Publisher(s)	Result
"Somebody That I Used To Know" – Gotye featuring Kimbra	Wally de Backer (aka Gotye), Luiz Bonfá	J Albert and Son Pty Ltd obo Op Shop Songs Pty Ltd and Kobalt Music Publishing Australia P/L, Warner/Chappell Music Australia Pty Ltd	Won

=== Pop Work of the Year ===
Title and/or artist	Writer(s)	Publisher(s)	Result
"Borrow My Heart" – Taylor Henderson	Alex Hope, Louis Schoorl, Hayley Warner	Sony/ATV Music Publishing Allegro (Australia) Pty Ltd, Universal Music Publishing Pty Ltd, Sony/ATV Music Publishing (Australia) Pty Ltd	Nominated
"Chandelier" – Sia	Sia Furler, Jesse Shatkin	Sony/ATV Music Publishing (Australia) Pty Ltd	Nominated
"Geronimo" – Sheppard	Jason Bovino, Amy Sheppard, George Sheppard	Mushroom Music Pty Ltd obo Empire of Song (Australia) Pty Ltd	Won
"Like a Drum" – Guy Sebastian	Guy Sebastian, David Harris, Romain Lorenzo, Samuel Martin	Universal Music Publishing Pty Ltd, Peace Pourage Music, Warner/Chappell Music Australia Pty Ltd obo Quinleez Music and Artist 101 Publishing Group, Warner/Chappell Music Australia Pty Ltd obo Sam Martin Music Publishing and Artist Publishing Group West	Nominated
"She Looks So Perfect" – 5 Seconds of Summer	Michael Clifford, Ashton Irwin, Jacob Sinclair	Sony/ATV Music Publishing (Australia) Pty Ltd, Mushroom Music Pty Ltd obo BMG Chrysalis	Nominated

=== Rock Work of the Year ===
Title and/or artist	Writer(s)	Publisher(s)	Result
"Love You Deserve" – Stonefield	Amy Findlay, Hannah Findlay, Holly Findlay, Sarah Findlay	Mushroom Music Pty Ltd	Won
"Sucker Punch" – Kingswood	Alexander Laska	Native Tongue Music Publishing	Nominated
"The End" – The Jezabels	Nikolas Kaloper, Samuel Lockwood, Hayley Mary, Heather Shannon	Mushroom Music Pty Ltd	Nominated
"The Same Man" – Dan Sultan	Pip Norman, Dan Sultan	Mushroom Music Pty Ltd	Nominated
"Under Your Skin" – Dan Sultan	Alexander Burnett, Pip Norman, Dan Sultan	Mushroom Music Pty Ltd	Nominated

=== Song of the Year ===
Title and/or artist	Writer(s)	Publisher(s)	Result
"Bittersweet" – Kasey Chambers and Bernard Fanning	Kasey Chambers, Bernard Fanning	Mushroom Music Pty Ltd	Nominated
"Chandelier" – Sia	Sia Furler, Jesse Shatkin	Sony/ATV Music Publishing (Australia) Pty Ltd	Won
"Geronimo" – Sheppard	Jason Bovino, Amy Sheppard, George Sheppard	Mushroom Music Pty Ltd obo Empire of Song (Australia) Pty Ltd	Nominated
"Kimberley Calling" – Dan Sultan	Dan Sultan	Mushroom Music Pty Ltd	Nominated
"You Ruin Me" – The Veronicas	Anthony Egizii, David Musumeci, Lisa Origliasso, Jessica Origliasso	Sony/ATV Music Publishing (Australia) Pty Ltd, Universal Music Publishing Pty Ltd	Nominated

=== Songwriter of the Year ===
- Sia (aka Sia Furler)

=== Ted Albert Award for Outstanding Services to Australian Music ===
- Fifa Riccobono

=== Urban Work of the Year ===
Title and/or artist	Writer(s)	Publisher(s)	Result
"Live It Up" –360 featuring Pez	Matthew Colwell, Perry Chapman, Kaelyn Behr (aka Styalz Fuego), Dennis Dowlut, Nicholas Martin	Universal Music Publishing Pty Ltd, Sony/ATV Music Publishing (Australia) Pty Ltd	Nominated
"My Life (Bliss N Eso song)" – Bliss n Eso featuring Ceekay Jones	Max MacKinnon, Jonathan Notley, Matthew Kirk, Nigel Kirk, Ebony West	Mushroom Music Pty Ltd, Warner/Chappell Music Australia Pty Ltd obo Runway Star Music Publishing and WB Music Corp	Nominated
"Price of Fame" – 360 featuring Gossling	Kaelyn Behr (aka Styalz Fuego), Matthew Colwell (aka 360)	Sony/ATV Music Publishing Australia P/L / Universal Music Publishing Pty Ltd	Nominated
"Tightrope" – Illy featuring Scarlett Stevens	Mark Landon, Alasdair Murray	Mushroom Music Pty Ltd obo WAU Publishing, Mushroom Music Pty Ltd	Won
"Won't Let You Down" – Hilltop Hoods featuring Maverick Sabre	Barry Francis, Matthew Lambert, Daniel Smith, James Diamond, Tony Hymas, Cameron Ludik, Michael Stafford	Sony/ATV Music Publishing (Australia) Pty Ltd, Diamond Brothers Music, Warner/Chappell Music Australia Pty Ltd obo Heatpar Ltd of Fairview Cottage, Universal Music Publishing Pty Ltd	Nominated

== Art Music Awards ==
=== Instrumental Work of the Year ===
Title	Composer	Performer	Result
Piano Trio The Village	Carl Vine	Sitkovetsky Trio	Nominated
The Secret Noise	Damien Ricketson	Ensemble Offspring	Won
Shadow Box	Damian Barbeler	Genevieve Lacey, James Crabb	Nominated
The Nightingale and the Rose	Paul Grabowsky	Paul Grabowsky, Genevieve Lacey, Flinders Quartet	Nominated

=== Jazz Work of the Year ===
Title	Composer	Performer	Result
Love Like a Curse	Paul Grabowsky	Monash Art Ensemble	Nominated
Mujing	Simon Barker, Carl Dewhurst, Bae Il-Dong, Riley Lee, Matt McMahon, Phil Slater	Simon Barker (drums), Carl Dewhurst (guitar), Bae Il-Dong (vocalist), Riley Lee (shakuhachi), Matt McMahon (piano), Phil Slater (trumpet)	Nominated
Music for Average Photography	Mace Francis	Mace Francis Orchestra	Won
Pius Bartosik	Daniel Susnjar	Daniel Susnjar Afro-Peruvian jazz group	Nominated

=== Orchestral Work of the Year ===
Title	Composer	Performer	Result
Concerto for clarinet and orchestra	Lachlan Skipworth	West Australian Symphony Orchestra, Ashley Smith (soloist), Baldur Brönnimann (conductor)	Nominated
Dramatis Personae – Music for Trumpet and Orchestra	Brett Dean	Håkan Hardenberger (soloist), Brett Dean (conductor), Sydney Symphony Orchestra	Won
Elastic Band – for solo improvised violin and orchestra	Elena Kats-Chernin, Jon Rose	Jon Rose with Adelaide Symphony Orchestra, Ilan Volkov (conductor)	Nominated
Jandamarra - Sing for the Country	Paul Stanhope, Steve Hawke (librettist)	Brett Weymark, Simon Lobelson, Singers and Dancers of the Yilimbirri Ensemble, Gondwana Choirs and Sydney Symphony Orchestra	Nominated

=== Vocal / Choral Work of the Year ===
Title	Composer / librettist	Performer	Result
Afterwards	Stephen Adams	Sydney Chamber Choir, Claire Edwardes	Nominated
How Shall We Sing in a Strange Land?	Joseph Twist / Oodgeroo Noonuccal	National Youth Choir of Australia. Australian Boys Choir & The Vocal Consort	Nominated
Mass of Deliverance	Dan Walker	Leichhardt Espresso Chorus, Sydney Brass, Michelle Leonard (conductor)	Nominated
The Riders	Iain Grandage / Alison Croggon, based on the novel by Tim Winton	Victorian Opera	Won

=== Performance of the Year ===
Title	Composer / librettist	Performer	Result
Beauty Will Be Amnesiac or Will not Be at All	Anthony Pateras	Synergy Percussion	Nominated
"Concerto for Clarinet and Orchestra"	Lachlan Skipworth	Ashley William Smith (soloist), West Australian Symphony Orchestra, Baldur Brönnimann (conductor)	Won
"Concerto for Orchestra"	Carl Vine	West Australian Symphony Orchestra, Michael Stern (conductor)	Nominated
Luz meridional, "Twenty-four Études for Pianoforte, no. 411"	Andrián Pertout	Michael Keiran Harvey	Nominated

=== Award for Excellence by an Individual ===
Individual	Work	Result
Jeanell Carrigan	Resurrecting the piano music of Meta Overman	Nominated
Julian Day	Excellence in researching, broadcasting and presenting the work of Australian musicians to a broad national and international public on broadcast and print media outlets	Nominated
Peter Knight	Leadership, composition, performance and curation	Nominated
Ross Edwards	Contribution to Australian chamber music	Won

=== Award for Excellence by an Organisation ===
Organisation	Work	Result
Gondwana Choirs	2014 artistic program, and significant contribution to Australian music since 1989	Won
Moorambilla Voices	2014 program and contribution to musical life in remote New South Wales	Nominated
Sydney Chamber Choir	40 years of outstanding contribution to Australian choral music	Nominated
Synergy Percussion	40 years of Synergy percussion in 2014	Nominated

=== Award for Excellence in Music Education ===
Organisation / individual	Work	Result
Lorraine Milne	Sustained contribution to music education	Won
Moorambilla Voices	Education work in North West New South Wales	Nominated
Sydney Symphony Orchestra	TunED-Up!	Nominated
Topology	Top Up: music education program	Nominated

=== Award for Excellence in a Regional Area ===
Organisation / individual	Work	Result
Boyd and Alison	Coalface 2014	Nominated
Moorambilla Voices	Moorambilla Voices Program 2014	Nominated
New England Conservatorium of Music	New England Sings!	Won
Tyalgum Music Festival	2014 activity	Nominated

=== Award for Excellence in Experimental Music ===
Organisation / individual	Work	Result
Darrin Verhagen	Activity/projects	Nominated
Jon Rose, Ensemble Offspring, Speak Percussion	Ghan Tracks	Nominated
Luke Johnson	Ornate Boredom Machine	Nominated
Richard Johnson	SoundOut Festival of Experimental and Improvised Music	Won

=== Award for Excellence in Jazz ===
Organisation / individual	Work	Result
Alister Spence, Christopher Cantillo and Joe Williamson	Begin	Nominated
Julien Wilson	Recording and touring associated with the establishment of Lionsharecords	Won
PBS 106.7FM	The Young Elder of Jazz Commission	Nominated
Peter Knight	Leadership, composition, performance, curation	Nominated

=== Distinguished Services to Australian Music ===
Organisation / individual	Result
Larry Sitsky	Won

== Screen Music Awards ==
=== Feature Film Score of the Year ===
Title	Composer	Result
Good 'Ol Boy	Michael Lira	Nominated
Loin des Hommes	Nick Cave, Warren Ellis	Nominated
Slow West	Jed Kurzel	Won
The Water Diviner	David Hirschfelder	Nominated

=== Best Music for an Advertisement ===
Title	Composer	Result
Aldi – "Perfect Aussie Christmas"	Elliot Wheeler	Nominated
Bundaberg Rum – "Men like Us"	Nathan Cavaleri	Nominated
Domain – "Good Move"	Bruce Heald	Won
Tahiti Tourism	Josh Abrahams, Davide Carbone	Nominated

=== Best Music for Children's Television ===
Title	Composer	Result
Bubble Bath Bay	Russell Thornton	Nominated
Giggle and Hoot: The Legend of Pirate Hootbeard	Sean Peter	Nominated
Joseph	Michael Dooley	Nominated
Monster Beach	Keith Moore	Won

=== Best Music for a Documentary ===
Title	Composer	Result
35 Letters	Gerard Fitzgerald, Lindsay Jehan, Adrian Sergovich, Haydn Walker	Nominated
Sherpa	Antony Partos	Won
The Great Australian Race Riot	Caitlin Yeo	Nominated
The Waler: Australia's Great Warhorse	Tim Count, Keith Van Geyzel	Nominated

=== Best Music for a Mini-Series or Telemovie ===
Title	Composer	Result
Redfern Now	Antony Partos	Nominated
The Secret River	Burkhard Dallwitz	Won
The War That Changed Us	Ash Gibson Greig	Nominated
Wasteland Panda: Exile	Christopher Larkin	Nominated

=== Best Music for a Short Film ===
Title	Composer	Result
1919	Damien Lane	Won
A Mighty Nice Man	Aaron Kenny	Nominated
Emergence	Damien Lane	Nominated
Flat Daddy	Guy Gross	Nominated

=== Best Music for a Television Series or Serial ===
Series or Serial	Episode title	Composer	Result
Banished	—N/a	David Hirschfelder	Won
Secrets and Lies	—N/a	Matteo Zingales	Nominated
The Code	—N/a	Roger Mason	Nominated
Who Do You Think You Are?	—N/a	Ash Gibson Greig	Nominated

=== Best Original Song Composed for the Screen ===
Song title	Work	Composer	Result
"Ballymullen Hill"	Banished	David Hirschfelder, Jimmy McGovern	Nominated
"Flying Giggle Ship"	Giggle and Hoot	Elizabeth Drummond, Hannah Field, Annie Hamilton	Nominated
"Head Full of Lies"	Residue	Georgi Kay, James Earp	Nominated
"A Secret River"	A Secret River	Shane Howard, Archie Roach	Won

=== Best Soundtrack Album ===
Title	Composer	Result
Felony	Bryony Marks	Nominated
Loin des Hommes	Nick Cave, Warren Ellis	Nominated
The Water Diviner	David Hirschfelder	Won
Women He's Undressed	Cezary Skubiszewski	Nominated

=== Best Television Theme ===
Title	Composer	Result
ANZAC Girls	Bryony Marks	Nominated
Maximum Choppage	Jonathan Bush	Nominated
Party Tricks	Bryony Marks	Nominated
The Code	Roger Mason	Won

=== Most Performed Screen Composer – Australia ===
Composer	Result
Adam Gock, Dinesh Wicks	Won
Daniel Sullivan	Nominated
Jay Stewart	Nominated
Neil Sutherland	Nominated

=== Most Performed Screen Composer – Overseas ===
Composer	Result
Adam Gock, Dinesh Wicks	Nominated
Alastair Ford	Nominated
Chris Harriot	Nominated
Neil Sutherland	Won
