= War Music =

War Music may refer to:

- War Music (composition), a 2015 musical composition by James Ledger
- War Music (poem), a project of British poet Christopher Logue
- War Music (Refused album)
- War Music (Slim the Mobster album)
- War Music (Vampire Rodents album)

== See also ==
- War song
- Urgh! A Music War
