= Sunman =

Sunman may refer to:

- Sunman, Indiana, town in the U.S. state of Indiana
- Sunman (video game), unreleased action video game developed by EIM
- Peter Sunman, Australian clarinetist

== See also ==
- Sun Man
