= Riccobono =

Riccobono is a surname. Notable people with this surname include:

- Eva Riccobono (born 1983), Italian actress
- Fifa Riccobono, Italian music executive
- Rosario Riccobono (1929–1982), Italian mobster
- Salvatore Riccobono (1864–1958), Italian Roman law scholar
- Vincenzo Riccobono (1861–1943), Italian botanist specialising in cacti
