= Alan Lourens =

Australian musician (born 1966)

Professor Alan Lourens FRSA
- Born: 1966 (age 59–60)
- Citizenship: Australian
- Occupations: Head, UWA Conservatorium of Music
- Years active: 2012 - 2026

Academic background
- Education: Indiana University School of Music
- Doctoral advisor: Ray E Cramer, Daniel Perantoni

Academic work
- Discipline: Music (conductor, composer, euphonium player)

Alan Lourens (born 1966) is a classical musician, composer, euphonium player and conductor from Perth, Western Australia. He was the head of the UWA Conservatorium of Music from January 2012 until August 2026.

== Biography ==
Lourens was born in Perth, Western Australia, and attended Scarborough Senior High School, where he won the prize for music in his graduating year. After completing a degree in Music Education at the Western Australian College of Advanced Education, Lourens taught brass and classroom music in public schools, based at Kelmscott Senior High School, and including conducting and teaching brass at Churchlands Senior High School and Perth Modern School. He returned to study at Indiana University School of Music, earning a master's degree in music (in Euphonium Performance) in 1992, and a Doctorate (in Wind Conducting) in 1999, working as an Associate Instructor to Harvey Phillips and in the Indiana University department of bands, working with the Marching Hundred. At Indiana, he studied Euphonium with M.Dee Stewart and Daniel Perantoni. He was also awarded a Performers Certificate for the quality of his Masters recital.

From 2000, Lourens has held leadership positions at the Western Australian Academy of Performing Arts (as Head of Classical Music), and has held positions in Singapore (at Lasalle College of the Arts), and in Dubai. His name was also associated with a possible appointment as Head of the Australian National University School of Music. In 2009, he was elected as a Fellow of the Royal Society of Arts (FRSA).

== UWA Conservatorium of Music ==
Lourens was appointed as Head the UWA School of Music in 2012, and reappointed in 2016. He was also appointed as a full Professor of Music in 2016. Lourens oversaw the change to the name UWA Conservatorium of Music, as well as a rise in the ranking of the school into the top 50 in the world, according to the QS Subject Ranking in Performing Arts.

During his tenure, the school has embedded "Melbourne Model" degree structures, which has seen the school more than double in size., re-introduced the Bachelor of Music degrees (rather than BA), as well as developing several majors in Electronic Music.

Lourens is a leading contributor to the Australian national debate surrounding the place of music in society., arguing the for educational benefits of music for all.

From 2022, Lourens has held a seat on the Board of directors of the AMEB National Board.

Alan's tenure at the Conservatorium of Music ended in August 2026.

== Musical activities ==
Lourens is a former conductor of WA Brass, one of Australia's leading British-style brass bands with which he has been associated since 1983, as well as conducting the UWA Orchestra, and has previously directed the UWA Wind Orchestra. Lourens previously conducted the University Wind Orchestra, which was an amalgamated ensemble of the UWA and ECU, which was cited as one of the first tertiary wind groups in the country. He has also been a guest conductor with the Fremantle Symphony Orchestra, Philharmonic Winds (Singapore), and others across Australia.

Lourens has been the conductor of many world premier performances, including Peter Sculthorpe's Lament for Violin, Cello and Strings.

== Author and Composer ==
As an author, he has made contributions to the MBM Times Vol 5, Vol 6 and Vol 7. He also co-authored two books on University Administration, as well as contributions to the popular press. Lourens contributed to the "Teaching Music in Performance Through Band" series in Vol 2 and 3, in "Teaching Music Through Performing Marches", and about repertoire in the influential California Music Educators Association Magazine. He is a frequent presenter of concert talks for the West Australian Symphony Orchestra.

In 2016, the New Zealand Euphonium Virtusoso Riki McDonnell performed the world premiere of his Euphonium Concerto (for Euphonium and Orchestra) with the composer conducting. This work, like most of his output, is tonal and melodic. Lourens has also written other solo works for Euphonium and Cornet, and works for Concert and Brass Band. His most popular works are arrangements; Czardas by Vittorio Monti (for Euphonium and various ensembles) and Bluebells of Scotland for Tuba and Band, which is listed in the "Guide to the Tuba Repertoire". The Trumpet/Cornet player Sean Priest commissioned and recorded two arrangements for his album "Crossover", featuring Priest and the Kew Brass Band.

In 2018 he was an adjudicator at the Australian National Band Championships, as Chief Concert Adjudicator and in the A Grade Brass category. He has previously been an adjudicator at the Tasmanian Band Championships, the 2020 NSW Band Association Online Band Festival, and Australian Band and Orchestra Directors Association (ABODA) events in WA, Queensland and South Australia.

== Selected compositions/arrangements ==
- Euphonium Concerto (Premiered by Riki McDonnell)
- Euphonium Sonata "Arcades and Alleys" (Premiered by Fletcher Mitchell)
- Rite of Passage "Variations on a Theme of Paganini" Selected as the Open Euphonium Test Piece for the Australian Band Championships 2020. (Championships cancelled due to COVID-19).
- Three Miniatures for Euphonium and Piano
- Canonfire: Romping after Pachelbel for Concert Band (Premiered by California State University, Northridge Wind Ensemble)
- Vittorio Monti: Czardas arrangement for Euphonium.
- Arthur Pryor arr Lourens, Bluebells of Scotland (for Tuba and Piano and Tuba and Band)
- Steven Bryant Ecstatic Dances. (arranged for Brass Band by Alan Lourens)
- Three Miniatures for Euphonium and Piano
- Danza Simplice for Euphonium and Piano
- Canonfire for Concert Band
- Rising from the Ashes: An Australian Elegy
- Sunlight on Matilda Bay
- Nullabor Dawn; Fanfare for Concert Band

== Selected recordings ==
- Shostakovich: Symphony No. 12 (WA Youth Orchestra) (Conductor)
- Ted Egan "We Are the Anzacs" (Conductor)
- Luminosity: Musical Treasures (Euphonium)
- Hass: Lost in the Funhouse (Euphonium)
- Saxophone Vocalise: Eugene Rousseau, Saxophone and Frederick Fennell, Conductor

== Degrees and awards ==
- 1987 Diploma of Teaching, Western Australian College of Advanced Education
- 1989 Bachelor of Education Western Australian College of Advanced Education
- 1992 Master of Music (Euphonium Performance) Indiana University School of Music, Bloomington
- 1992 Performance Certificate Indiana University School of Music, Bloomington
- 1999 Doctor of Music (Wind Conducting) Indiana University School of Music, Bloomington
- 2009 Fellow of the Royal Society of Arts
