= David Tunley =

Australian musicologist (1930–2024)

David Evatt Tunley AM FAHA (3 May 1930 – 23 June 2024) was an Australian musicologist and occasional composer, noted for his work on François Couperin and French music in the 17th and 18th centuries. He was Emeritus Professor at the School of Music, University of Western Australia in Perth.

== Early life ==
David Tunley was born in Sydney, Australia, and educated at the New South Wales State Conservatorium of Music, where he studied piano with Alexander Sverjensky (1947–50). He taught music at Fort Street High School in Sydney between 1953 and 1957. He took (externally) the BMus and MMus degrees of the University of Durham in 1958 and 1963, and studied composition with Nadia Boulanger in Paris between 1964 and 1965 on a French government scholarship.

== Career ==
Tunley joined the University of Western Australia (UWA) in 1958 as its first full-time lecturer in Music, under head of department Frank Callaway. He was appointed to a Personal Chair in 1980 and to the Chair of Music in 1989.

As a scholar Tunley was internationally recognised as the leading authority on the 18th-century French cantata, and his 1974 book on the subject became the classic study. His books and many articles as well as contributions to The New Grove Dictionary, the New Oxford History of Music and Die Musik in Geschichte und Gegenwart, covered a wide range of research including French music from the 17th to 19th centuries, Australian and British music in the 20th century and aspects of music education.

The New York publisher Garland Press issued 23 volumes of 18th and 19th century French vocal music, compiled and edited by Tunley. In 1983 he was made a Chevalier of the Ordre des Palmes Académiques for services to French music, and in 1987 became a member of the Order of Australia for services to music in his own country. He was a national president of the Musicological Society of Australia, chair of the Music Board of the Australia Council, and a federal chairperson of the Australian Music Examinations Board. He was a research fellow at Christ Church and Wolfson Colleges in Oxford and at the Rockefeller Study Center at Bellagio in Italy.

He created various community events in Perth and the surrounding areas such as the York Winter Music Festival, which ran for ten years, and more recently the Terrace Proms. He was the founder conductor of the University Collegium Musicum choir whose annual Christmas concert is still one of the musical highlights of the year. Recognition of his work came through the Australian Academy of the Humanities of which he became a fellow in 1980. He took early retirement from UWA in 1994 in order to devote himself more fully to his research, continuing as honorary senior research fellow in music until his death.

In 1995 UWA published a collection of essays evaluating his writings and compositions. In May 2010, Lecture Room G.05 in the School of Music at UWA was renamed the Tunley Lecture Theatre in his honour.

== Personal life ==
Tunley married Paula Laurantus, a pianist, in 1959 and there were three children: Sonia, Martin and Rachel. He died on 23 June 2024, at the age of 94.

== Works ==
=== Composition ===
As a composer Tunley wrote: Two Carols for Chorus (texts Gerald Manley Hopkins, 1955); A Wedding Masque for soloists, women’s chorus, and small orchestra; (1961; rev. 1970), Two Preludes for piano (1962); Suite for two violins (1965); Clarinet Concerto (1966; rev. 1999, completed while studying with Nadia Boulanger); Inflorescence for chorus, clarinet, and timpani (1978); Elegy—in memoriam Salek Mine for chamber ensemble (1986); and Immortal Fire for chorus and children’s voices (1999).

=== Publications ===
- The Eighteenth-Century French Cantata (1974, revised ed. 1997)
- Australian Composition in the 20th Century (ed. with Frank Callaway, 1980)
- Couperin (BBC Music Guide, 1982)
- Harmony in Action: A Practical Course in Tonal Harmony (1985)
- The Bel Canto Violin: the life and times of Alfredo Campoli, 1906–1993 (1999)
- François Couperin and 'The Perfection of Music' (2004)
- William James and the Beginnings of Modern Musical Australia (2007)
- Salons, Singers and Songs: A Background to Romantic French Song, 1830-1870 (2017)
