= Joseph Nolan (organist) =

British organist and conductor

- Born: 3 May 1974 (age 52)
- Origin: Hull, England
- Occupations: Organist and conductor
- Instrument: Organ
- Label: Signum Records

Joseph Nolan (born 3 May 1974) is an English-born Australian organist and conductor.

== Education ==
Joseph Nolan received a scholarship for the Royal College of Music in London, where he studied organ with Professor Richard Popplewell. During his time at the Royal College, he was awarded the Canon Bark Prize for most promising organ student. After receiving First Class Honours for his BMus final recital at the Temple Church in London, he continued his postgraduate studies for two years with Marie-Claire Alain in Paris. While in Paris, he was supported by scholarships he obtained from the Countess of Munster Musical Trust. and the Hattori Foundation. In London, he completed his studies with Dame Gillian Weir while being supported by the Royal Philharmonic Society.

== Career ==
In 2004, Nolan was appointed organist to the Chapel Royal St. James's Palace. This allowed him to perform on numerous occasions at Buckingham Palace, and it was here that he gave the opening concert on the refurbished organ in the Buckingham Palace Ballroom. He was also the first organist to make a commercial recording with this organ on the UK recording label Signum Records. In 2008, Nolan was appointed Organist and Master of the Choristers of St George's Cathedral, Perth in Western Australia. The Cathedral's consort is now described as "One of Australia's Best".

In addition to his cathedral duties, Nolan performs regularly in concert around Australia and in Europe. He has appeared with the West Australian Symphony Orchestra and has performed solo in recital at the Sydney Opera House as part of the Sydney Symphony Orchestra's 2017 concert season. He has performed with several groups, including the King's Singers at the Bad Homberg International Festival, and with trumpeters Alison Balsom, Crispian Steele-Perkins and David Elton.

As a recording artist, Nolan is particularly known for his recordings of the complete organ works of Charles-Marie Widor for Signum Records. These pieces were recorded at the French churches of La Madeleine, Paris; St. Francois de Sales, Lyon; and St. Sernin Toulouse and received two Editor's Choice awards in Limelight Magazine, Australia. Nolan completed recording Widor's Organ Symphonies with the release of Volume 5 in February 2016, featuring the Symphony gothique, Op.70 and Symphony romane, Op.73 which received five-star reviews in Limelight Magazine and in the UK magazine Choir & Organ, and later a nomination for Limelight Magazine's 2016 instrumental recording of the year. In June 2017 Nolan embarked on a cycle of complete performances of the Widor Symphonies - 10 symphonies in 7 days - in Melbourne, and the following month released a sixth disc of Widor's other works for solo organ which was a 2017 Critics' Choice in Gramophone Magazine. His most recent release for Signum in January 2018 was recorded at St. Etienne du Mont, Paris and features, amongst other works, the world premiere recording of David Briggs' Le Tombeau de Duruflé. It was awarded Limelight Magazine's Recording of the Month in March 2018.

In April 2016, Nolan was made a Chevalier (Knight) in the Order of French Arts and Letters for his services to French Music. He was also appointed (in 2013) as an Honorary Research Fellow of the University of Western Australia Conservatorium of Music in recognition for his musical accomplishments in Perth, Australia and abroad. In March 2018 the University awarded Joseph their prestigious higher doctorate, the Doctor of Letters.

He became an Australian citizen in 2012.

== Discography ==
- Supernova (2001), Ripon Cathedral, Herald AV HAVPCD274
- Widor: Organ Symphonies Nos. 1&2 (2004), Liverpool Metropolitan Cathedral, ASV Records ASV1165
- Widor Organ Symphony No.4, Guilmant Organ Sonata, Roger-Ducasse Pastorale in F, Church of St. Ouen, Rouen, ASV Records ASV1175
- Toccare Incandescent (2007), Coventry Cathedral, Herald AV HAVPCD329
- The Organ of Buckingham Palace Ballroom (2008), Buckingham Palace Ballroom, Signum Records SIGCD114
- The Organ of Saint Sulpice, Paris (2009), Church of Saint-Sulpice, Paris, Signum Records SIGCD167
- Widor: The Organ Symphonies, Vol. 1 (2012), La Madeleine, Paris, Signum Records SIGCD292
- Organ Collection (2012), various, Signum Records SIGCD302
- Widor: The Organ Symphonies, Vol. 2 (2013), La Madeleine, Paris, Signum Records SIGCD319
- Widor: The Organ Symphonies, Vol. 3 (2013), La Madeleine, Paris, Signum Records SIGCD334
- Widor: The Organ Symphonies, Vol. 4 (2014), La Madeleine, Paris, Signum Records SIGCD337
- Widor: The Organ Symphonies, Vol. 5 (2016), La Madeleine, Paris and St. Sernin Toulouse, Signum Records SIGCD347
- Widor: Solo Organ Works (2017), St. Sernin Toulouse and St. Francois de Sales, Lyon, Signum Records SIGCD438
- Midnight at St Etienne du Mont (2018), St. Etienne du Mont, Paris, Signum Records SIGCD470
