= John Forrest Secondary College =

School in Morley, Western Australia

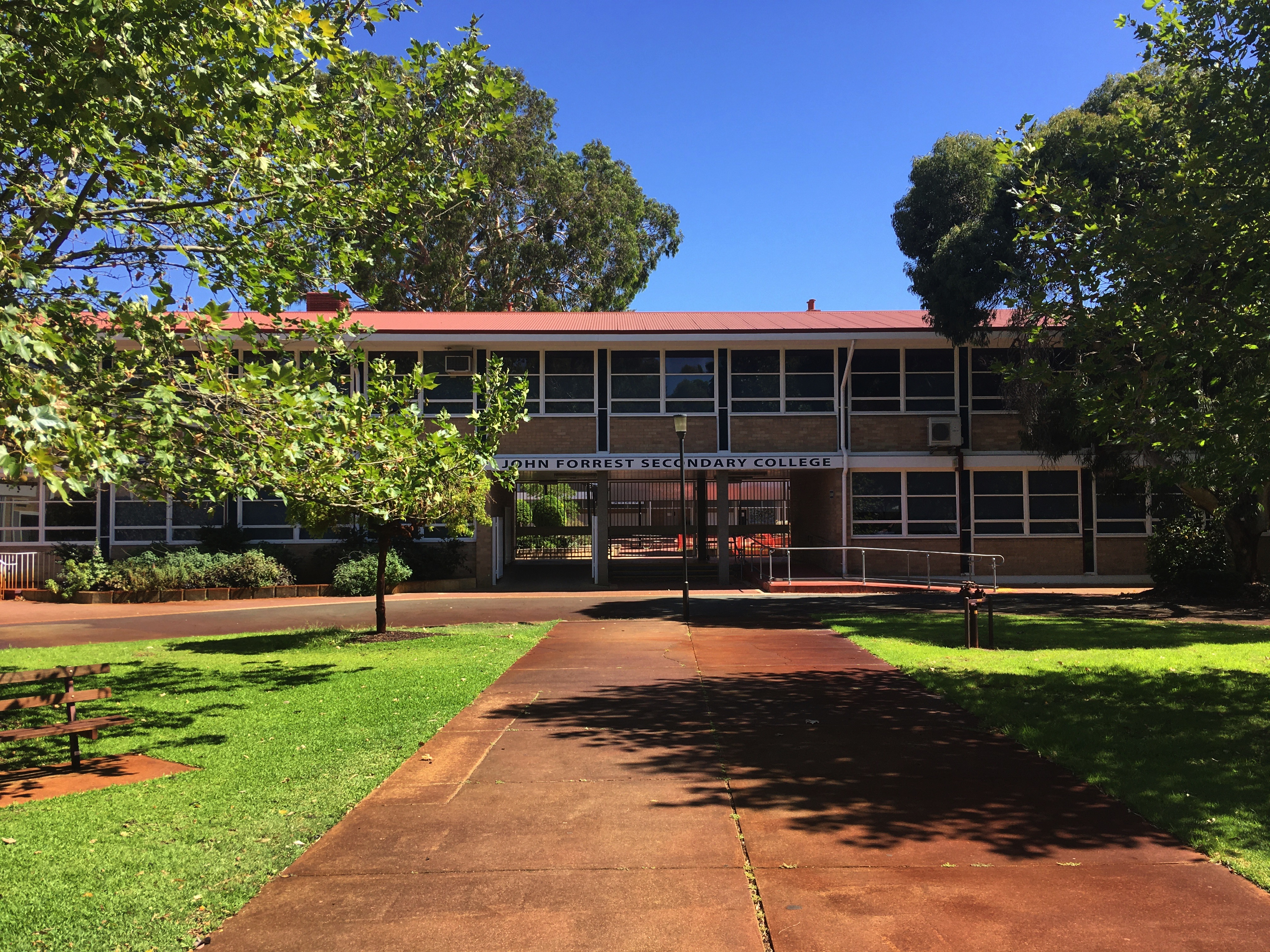
- Main entrance

Location
- 180 Drake Street; Morley, Western Australia; Australia; 31°54′17″S 115°54′03″E

Information
- Former names: John Forrest Senior High School, Embleton High School
- Type: Independent public co-educational day school
- Motto: Courtesy
- Opened: 1961; 65 years ago
- Educational authority: WA Department of Education
- Principal: Denise Robinson
- Staff: 118 (2022)
- Years: 7–12
- Enrolment: 1,092 (2022)
- Campus type: Suburban
- Colours: Navy blue and gold
- Athletics: Cricket; Netball; Tennis
- Website: www.johnforrest.wa.edu.au

John Forrest Secondary College (abbreviated as JFSC) is an Independent Public secondary school in the Perth suburb of Morley, Western Australia.

== History ==
John Forrest Secondary College was established in 1961 as Embleton High School. In 1963, it was renamed John Forrest High School. On 17 October 1964, Western Australian governor Douglas Kendrew officially opened the school as John Forrest Senior High School. The school is named after the first Premier of Western Australia, John Forrest. The gymnasium was built in 1965. During its construction, the roof collapsed after the steel girders bent.

In the late 1960s, the school became increasingly overcrowded, despite the 1966 establishment of Hampton High School nearby. In 1970, Morley High School was established, but a site had not been selected. At first, Morley High School consisted of 250 students at nine demountable classrooms on John Forrest school grounds. Morley had its own staff, principal and P&C association, but it used John Forrest's canteen, library and sporting facilities. Morley would later move out in 1973 when its own campus had been constructed.

From 2008 to 2010, a trade training centre was constructed at the school at a cost of A$2.6 million. The facility is shared with Mount Lawley Senior High School.

In 2011, it became an Independent Public School. Alongside this, the school's name was changed to John Forrest Secondary College. In 2015, John Forrest started accepting year 7 students for the first time, becoming a 7–12 school, alongside most other public high schools in the state.

In 2020, it was awarded "best school garden" in the City of Bayswater Garden Awards.

=== Redevelopment ===
During the 2017 state election campaign, the Labor Party committed $50 million to build and refurbish facilities at John Forrest Secondary College if elected. Following that, the Liberal Party promised $15 million to upgrade the school if re-elected. The Labor party ended up winning the election, and so planning started on the $50 million upgrade.

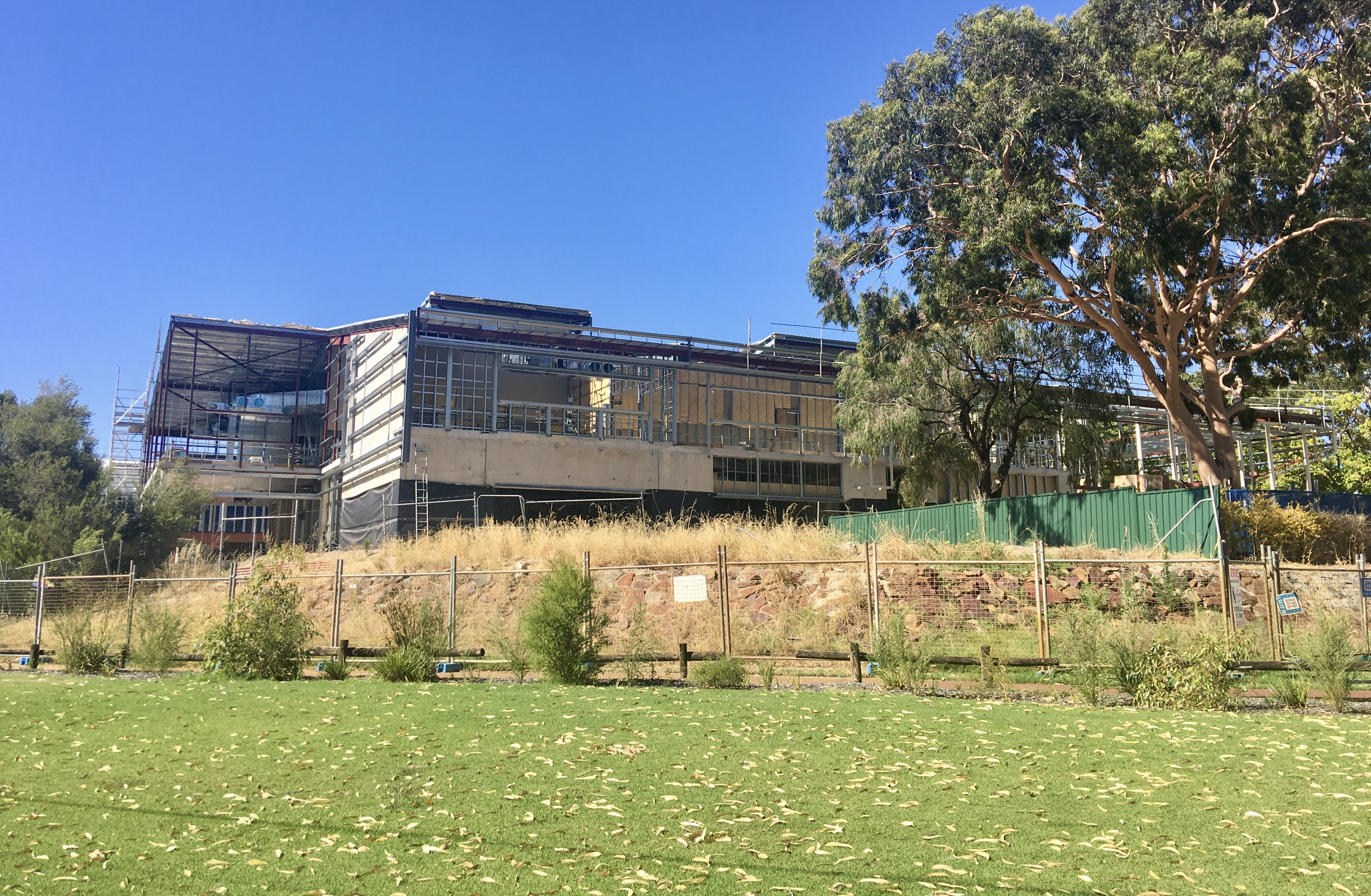
Construction site in January 2022

In July 2019, an architect was appointed. During 2020, the school's tennis courts were relocated to make way for the new buildings. The construction is split into three stages. The first stage involves the construction of a performing arts facility for dance, drama, media, music and visual arts, a materials technology building for building and construction, woodwork, metalwork, engineering, robotics and mechatronics, and a building for food and textiles classes, a cafeteria and an IT centre. The second stage involves the demolition of the previous materials technology building and construction of a new sports hall. The final stage involves turning the old library into a new administration area, the old sports hall into a library and various other refurbishments to old facilities. Construction on the first stage started early 2021, and the final stage is scheduled to be complete by January 2024. The project will expand the capacity of the school to 1,300 students.

== Programs ==
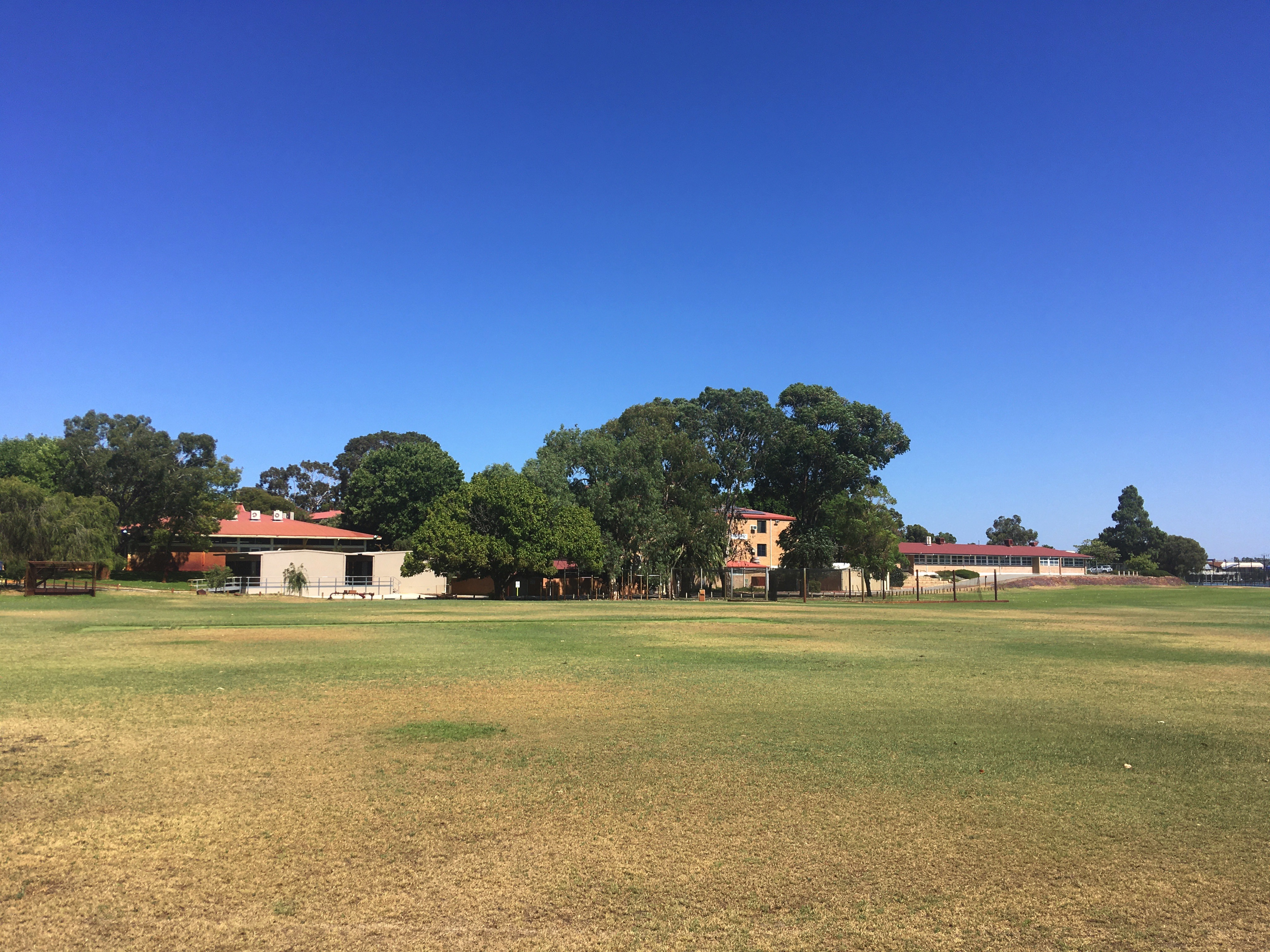
John Forrest Secondary College from Broun Avenue

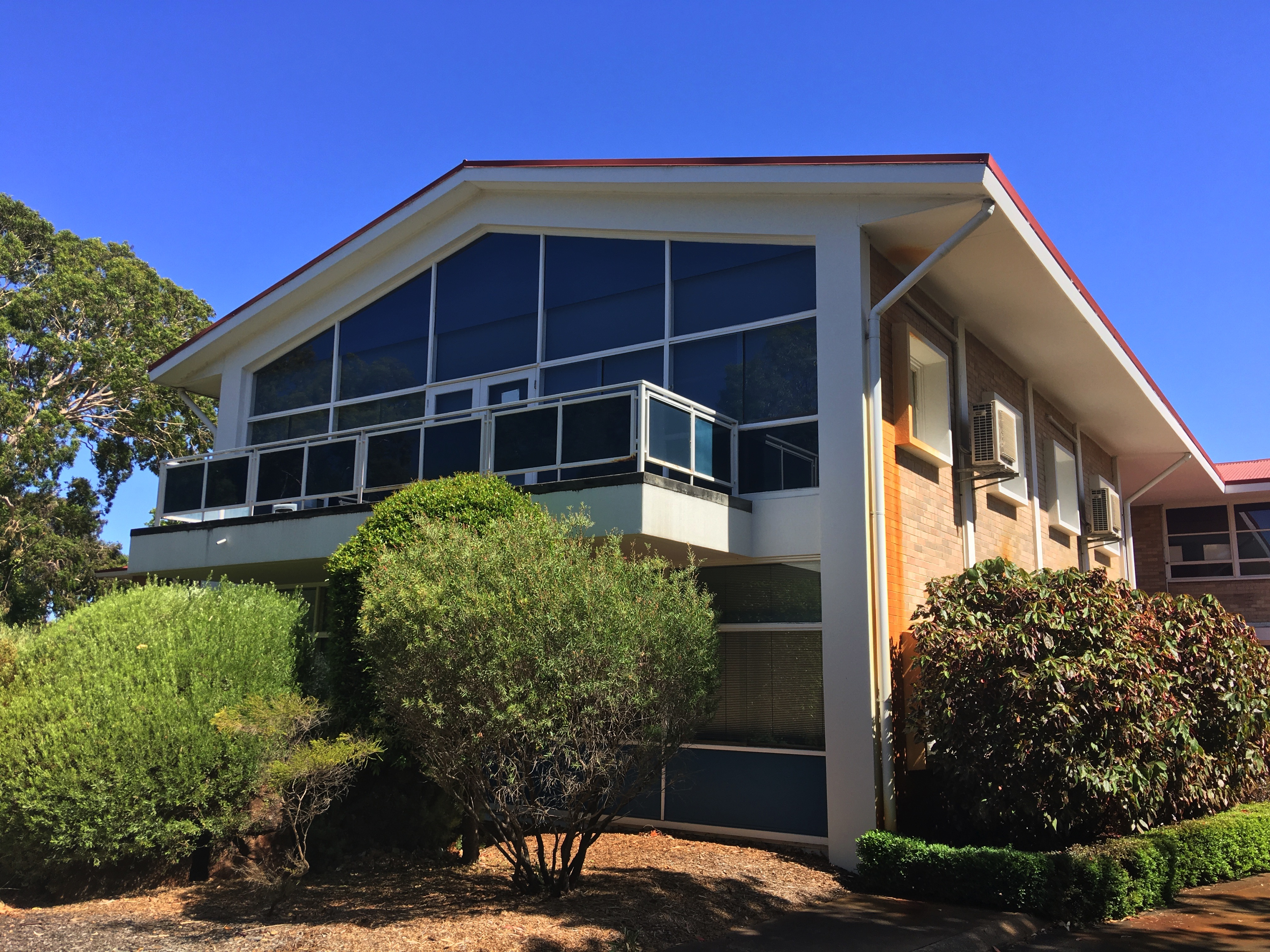
John Forrest Secondary College administration building

John Forrest Secondary College offers Department of Education endorsed specialist programs in Cricket, Music, Netball and Tennis, and the college based Academic Excellence Program (AEP) and Computer Science Program.

=== Cricket ===
John Forrest's cricket program is endorsed by the Western Australian Cricket Association. The cricket program includes four hours per week of class time, regular competitions, interstate and international cricket tours. Students play on a turf wicket at school grounds and often travel to the WACA Ground. The program is supported by patron Bruce Reid, who is a former student.

=== Music ===
To gain entry to the music program, students must audition. Students in the program do music theory, weekly instrumental lessons, ensembles outside class time and various performances and concerts. The music program is open to year 6's from nearby schools, where they travel to John Forrest for an hour each week. Facilities for music are two music classrooms and four instrumental rooms. Students can choose to do Music ATAR in years 11 and 12. Ashley Smith, former student of John Forrest, and now Head of Woodwind and Contemporary Performance at UWA Conservatorium of Music is the patron for the music program.

=== Netball ===
Netball students have four hours per week of class time and are involved in competitions. Jessica Anstiss, player for the West Coast Fever is the patron for the netball program.

=== Tennis ===
In the tennis program, students study tennis for four hours per week and participate in competitions. Margaret Court was the patron of the tennis program until October 2017 after the school board wrote to her, asking

to confirm that your views align with our college and will allow you to be promoted to our students as someone who values diversity and inclusivity, is accepting of race and cultural difference and will happily accept people with different sexualities.

Thanking the school "for the privilege of being patron for four years", Court formally withdrew from the position due to being "unable to support all the organisations she once did" because of increasing commitments.

John Forrest was named Western Australia's most outstanding school at the 2017 WA Tennis Industry Awards Night.

== Local intake area ==
John Forrest Secondary College's local intake area covers Ashfield, Bedford, most of Bayswater (excluding north of Collier Road), part of Dianella (south of Alexander Drive, Morley Drive and Light Street), part of Embleton (south of Collier Road), part of Inglewood (north-east of Dundas Road), part of Maylands, part of Morley (south-west of Walter Road and Collier Road) and a small part of Bassendean (near Ashfield).

Students living in the local intake area have a guaranteed place at the school if they apply. Students living outside the local intake area may join the school if they are accepted into one of the specialist programs or after being judged on a case-by-case basis.

== Transport ==
John Forrest Secondary College is located near the Galleria bus station and several bus routes. High frequency bus routes that stop nearby include the CircleRoute (routes 998 and 999), 950 and 955.

== Academic results ==
Year	Rank	Median ATAR	Eligible students	Students with ATAR	% Students with ATAR	Ref
2021	—N/a	80.10	174	60	34.48%	
2020	74	78.70	161	52	32.30%	
2019	65	78.70	160	52	32.50%	
2018	82	77.85	157	47	29.94%	
2017	126	67.00	143	55	38.46%	
2016	109	77.55	140	52	37.14%	

== Student numbers ==
Student numbers peaked at 1,500 in the late 1970s. Student numbers have significantly increased since 2015, partially due to year 7 students being accepted and the 2014 half cohort leaving.

Year	Number	Ref
2006	922	
2007	869	
2008	807	
2009	804	
2010	692	
2011	667	
2012	691	
2013	729	
2014	753	
2015	1,065	
2016	1,116	
2017	1,134	
2018	1,136	
2019	1,122	

== List of principals ==
Name	Years
George Cullen	1960–1969
Maurice Kelso	1970–1978
Stefan Slusarczyk	1979–1984
Neil Ryan	1985
Stefan Slusarczyk	1986
Neil Ryan	1987
Stefan Slusarczyk	1988–1990
Rose Moroz	1991
Peter Tennant	1992–1993
Larry Manno	1994
Rose Moroz	1995–1996
Alison Legg	1997
Karen Wearn	1998–2003
Phil Shea	2004
Digby Mercer	2005
Di Turner	2006–2011
Judy Silsbury	2012–2015
Melissa Gillett	2016–2021
Karen Read	2021–2021
Denise Robinson	2022–present

== Notable alumni ==
- Phil Adams – Former cricketer
- Chris Allen – Former WAFL footballer who played for East Perth as captain and Swan Districts Football Club
- Shane Clements – Retired cricketer
- Craig Edwards – Former WAFL footballer who played for East Perth and South Fremantle and won the 1989 Sandover Medal
- Bruce Reid – Retired cricketer, patron for the John Forrest Secondary College cricket program
- Alan Ridge – Former Liberal member for Kimberley and minister in the government of Charles Court
- Amber-Jade Sanderson – Labor member for Morley and former member for the East Metropolitan Region of the Legislative Council
- Ashley William Smith – Clarinet player, Chair of Woodwind and Contemporary performance at the UWA Conservatorium of Music and patron for the John Forrest Secondary College music program
- Mikayla Hyde – Australian rules football player. Drafted in 2021 to the Fremantle Dockers in the AFLW.
- Gustav McKeon – Cricketer, currently an opening batter for the French National Cricket Team. Was the youngest ever player to score two hundreds in his first three matches in T20I matches. Additionally, he was the first player in the world to score 600+ runs in 10 consecutive T20I innings surpassing the likes of Virat Kohli and Babar Azam.
- Ines McKeon – Cricketer, plays for the French Women’s National Cricket Team
- Simone Dow – Guitarist, member of Voyager. Represented Australia at the 2023 Eurovision Song Contest.

== See also ==
- List of schools in the Perth metropolitan area
