= Conversations with Ghosts =

Live album by Paul Kelly, James Ledger, Genevieve Lacey & ANAM Musicians
- Released: August 2013
- Recorded: October 2012
- Studios: Elisabeth Murdoch Hall, Melbourne
- Label: ABC Music

Paul Kelly albums chronology
Spring and Fall (2012)	Conversations with Ghosts (2013)	Goin' Your Way (2013)

Conversations with Ghosts is a live album by Paul Kelly, James Ledger, Genevieve Lacey & ANAM Musicians. The album was recorded at Elisabeth Murdoch Hall, Melbourne in October 2012, and released through ABC Music in August 2013.

At the ARIA Music Awards of 2013, the album won ARIA Award for Best Original Soundtrack, Cast or Show Album.

At the APRA Music Awards of 2013, the album was nominated for Work of the Year – Vocal or Choral.

== Track listing ==
1. "The Lake Isle of Innisfree (William Butler Yeats) - 8:07
2. "Bound to Follow" (Paul Kelly) - 4:33
3. "One Need Not Be a Chamber to Be Haunted" (Emily Dickinson) - 3:17
4. "Sailing to Byzantium (W.B. Yeats) - 4:33
5. "Night Ride" (Paul Kelly) - 3:52
6. "Five Bells" (Kenneth Slessor) - 12:16
7. "Basking Shark" (Norman MacCaig) - 4:40
8. "Once in a Lifetime, Snow" (Les Murray) - 2:39
9. "Woman to Man" (Judith Wright) - 3:22
10. "The Chimes at Midnight" (Paul Kelly) - 3:48
11. "Ring Out, Wild Bells (From In Memoriam) (Alfred, Lord Tennyson) - 5:25
12. "I'm Not Afraid of the Dark Anymore" (Innisfree Reprise) (Paul Kelly) - 4:22

== Charts ==
Chart (2013)	Peak position
Australian Albums (ARIA)	65
