= Thirteen Ways to Look at Birds =

Studio album by Paul Kelly and James Ledger
- Released: 30 August 2019
- Label: EMI Music Australia
- Producer: Paul Kelly

Paul Kelly studio chronology
Live at the Sydney Opera House (2019)	Thirteen Ways to Look at Birds (2019)	Songs from the South: 1985–2019 (2019)

Thirteen Ways to Look at Birds is a studio album by Australian musicians Paul Kelly and James Ledger, featuring Alice Keath and Seraphim Trio . The album was released on 30 August 2019 and peaked at number 43 on the ARIA Charts.

The album brings six musicians together to interpret bird inspired poems, written by John Keats, Thomas Hardy, Emily Dickinson, Judith Wright, Gerard Manley Hopkins, Gwen Harwood, A D Hope and others. The CD contains 16 tracks, but three are instrumentals not based on any poem: "Mudlarking", "Murmuration" and "Black Swan". The vinyl version contains an extra track, "Eurydice And The Tawny Frogmouth", positioned between "The Fly" and "Black Swan".

Though the song cycle is named in allusion to the Wallace Stevens poem "Thirteen Ways of Looking at a Blackbird", that particular poem is not one of the works adapted for this album.

At the ARIA Music Awards of 2019, the album won Best Classical Album.

== Track listing ==
For all songs, music by Paul Kelly and James Ledger

No.	Title	Poet/Lyricist	Length
1.	"Black Cockatoos"	Judith Wright	2:59
2.	"The Darkling Thrush"	Thomas Hardy	3:35
3.	"Leda and the Swan"	W. B. Yeats	5:01
4.	"Barn Owl"	Gwen Harwood	3:14
5.	"Mudlarking"	(instrumental)	2:43
6.	"A Barred Owl"	Richard Wilbur	4:19
7.	"'Hope' Is the Thing With Feathers"	Emily Dickinson	3:55
8.	"Ode To a Nightingale"	John Keats	8:03
9.	"Proud Songsters"	Thomas Hardy	1:52
10.	"Murmuration"	(instrumental)	3:59
11.	"Thornbills"	Judith Wright	3:03
12.	"The Fly"	Miroslav Holub translated by George Theiner	3:23
13.	"Black Swan"	(instrumental)	2:55
14.	"The Death of the Bird"	A.D. Hope	4:54
15.	"The Windhover"	Gerard Manley Hopkins	4:27
16.	"The Magpies"	Denis Glover	2:56

Extra track on LP version:

No.	Title	Poet/Lyricist	Length
1.	"Eurydice And The Tawny Frogmouth"	Robert Adamson	3:25

== Charts ==
Chart (2019)	Peak position
Australian Albums (ARIA)	43

== Release history ==
Region	Date	Format	Label	Catalogue
Australia	30 August 2019	CD, DD, LP	Decca Australia	GAWD028S
