= James Ledger =

Australian composer (born 1966)

- Born: 1966 (age 59–60)
- Citizenship: Australian
- Occupation: Composer

Academic background
- Education: Higher Doctorate of Music
- Alma mater: University of Western Australia

James Ledger (born 1966) is an Australian composer of contemporary classical music, and senior lecturer in composition at the Conservatorium of Music at the University of Western Australia, where he is chair of orchestral composition.

== Biography ==
Ledger first rose to prominence with his first orchestral composition Indian Pacific in 1996, which is still regularly performed in Australia. Ledger is also known for his compositions Devils in the Underground for solo trumpet, the violin concerto Golden Years, Chronicles for orchestra, War Music for choir and orchestra, and the song cycle Conversations with Ghosts in collaboration with the musician Paul Kelly, for which he won an ARIA award.

From 2007 to 2009 he was the composer-in-residence for the West Australian Symphony Orchestra. In 2011 he was named composer-in-residence for the Australian National Academy of Music.

In 2019 Ledger won the ARIA Award for Best Classical Album for Thirteen Ways to Look at Birds, another collaboration with Paul Kelly.

In 2020, he earned a Doctorate of Music from the University of Western Australia. His Viola Concerto, premiered by Brett Dean and the West Australian Symphony Orchestra, won the APRA AMCOS Art Music award in the "Work of the Year – Large Ensemble" category.

== Awards and nominations ==
=== ARIA Music Awards ===
The ARIA Music Awards is an annual awards ceremony that recognises excellence, innovation, and achievement across all genres of Australian music.

Year	Nominee / work	Award	Result	Ref.
2013	Conversations with Ghosts (with Paul Kelly, Genevieve Lacey & ANAM Musicians)	Best Original Soundtrack/Cast/ Show Album	Won	
2019	Thirteen Ways to Look at Birds (with Paul Kelly)	Best Classical Album	Won	

=== APRA AMCOS Awards and nominations ===
- 2006 Best Performance of an Australian Composition (Nominee) – WASO performing James Ledger, Line Drawing
- 2008 Orchestral Work of the Year (Nominee), James Ledger, Trumpet Concerto
- 2011 Work of the Year – Instrumental (Winner), James Ledger, Chronicles
- 2012 Performance of the Year (Winner), James Ledger, Two Memorials performed by WASO
- 2014, Work of the Year, Orchestral (Nominee), James Ledger, Golden Years
- 2020, Work of the Year, Large Ensemble (Winner), James Ledger, Viola Concerto (for Brett Dean)

== Works ==
=== Orchestra ===
- Indian Pacific (1996)
- Peeling (2004) for strings and percussion
- Habits of Creators (2004)
- Horn Concerto (2005)
- Line Drawing (2005) for recorder and strings
- Trumpet Concerto (2007)
- The Madness and Death of King Ludwig (2007) for large ensemble of brass, percussion, and double basses
- Arcs and Planes (2009)
- Chronicles (2009)
- Neon (2010) version for orchestra and chamber ensemble
- Outposts (2011) bassoon concerto (for Matthew Wilkie)
- Two Memorials (for Anton Webern and John Lennon) (2011)
- Golden Years (2013) concerto for violin and orchestra
- News, Weather and Dreams (2014)
- War Music (2015)
- Simpler Times (2015)
- The Natural Church (2016) for chamber orchestra
- Hollow Kings (2016)
- The Natural Order of Things (2017) for strings
- Viola Concerto (2019) concerto for viola and orchestra

=== Chamber ensemble ===
- Abandoned Drive-in (2002) for mixed ensemble
- Mean Ol' World (2004) for mixed ensemble
- Two Fanfares (2005) for brass ensemble
- Inscriptions (2006) for piano trio
- Bell Weather (2008) for mixed ensemble
- Rashomon Confessions (2009) for clarinet and string quartet
- Processions (2011) for string quartet
- In Orbit (2011) for mixed ensemble
- Silver Swans (2012) for mixed ensemble
- Igor's Drum (2013) for mixed ensemble
- When Chaplin Met Einstein (2014) for mixed ensemble
- House of Stairs (2014) for piano quartet
- The Distortion Mirror (2018) for string quartet and live electronics

=== Solo ===
- Devils on the Underground (2010) for trumpet and live electronics
- Quickening (2010) for vibraphone and live electronics
- All Hail the Machine (2011) for bass clarinet and live electronics
- See How They Run (2012) for violin and portable audio player
- Blood Water Wine (2013) for cello
- Chant (2017) for double bass
- Intended Inventions (2018) for piano
