= Jennifer Fowler =

British composer of Australian birth

Jennifer Joan Fowler (born 14 April 1939) is a British composer of Australian birth. She was born in Bunbury, Australia, and graduated with a Bachelor of Arts in music and a Bachelor of Music from the School of Music, University of Western Australia in 1960 and 1967, respectively. During her time at University of Western Australia, she won several composition prizes and received the University Convocation Awards for outstanding results. While a student, her pieces were performed in the Festival of Perth and broadcast by ABC. She spent a year working at the Electronic Music Studios of the University of Utrecht in 1968. In 1969 she settled in London and works as a free-lance composer. Fowler married computer programmer Bruce Paterson and has two sons.

== Honors and awards ==
- 1970 Prize from the Academy of the Arts in Berlin
- 1971 Joint winner of the Radcliffe Award of Great Britain
- 1975 1st prize in the International Competition for Women Composers in Mannheim, Germany
- 2001 Eat and Be Eaten won a High Commendation at the Paul Lowin Song Cycle Awards
- 2003 Miriam Gideon prize from the International Association of Women in Music
- 2006 2nd prize in the Christopher Bodman Memorial Competition, UK
- 2009 International Sylvia Glickman Memorial Prize
- 2009 Winner of the Marin Goleminov First International Composition Contest in Bulgaria

== Works ==
Selected works include:

- Lament for Dunblane, for chorus
- Magnificat, for chorus
- Nunc Dimittis, for chorus
- Blow Flute
- Towards Release, duo for violin and marimba
- Piece for an Opera House, for piano duo
- Cycling for solo piano
- Streaming Up for 4 bassoons and piano
- Echoes from an Antique Land
- Plainsong for Strings for string orchestra

Her works have been recorded and issued on CD, including:

- The Flute Ascendant (1992), Vox
- Sydney Dreaming, ABC Classics
- Lines Spun (2019), Metier MSV28588
