= Matthew Wilkie =

Australian classical bassoonist

Matthew Wilkie is an Australian classical bassoonist. He is Principal Bassoon with the Chamber Orchestra of Europe (COE) and Principal Emeritus Bassoon with the Sydney Symphony Orchestra. He has made a substantial number of recordings, notably with the COE, in both a full orchestra and as a member of the Wind Soloists of the Chamber Orchestra of Europe.

Wilkie studied with Klaus Thunemann at the Hochschule für Musik und Theater Hannover.

James Ledger wrote Outposts, a bassoon concerto, for Wilkie, which Wilkie premiered with the Sydney Symphony Orchestra in 2011.
