= Paavali Jumppanen =

Finnish classical pianist (born 1974)

- Born: 17 July 1974 (age 51); Espoo, Finland
- Education: Sibelius Academy; Basel Music Academy
- Occupation: Pianist
- Website: www.paavalijumppanen.com

Paavali Jumppanen (born 17 July 1974) is a Finnish classical pianist.

== Biography ==
Beethoven's Piano Sonata No. 1 performed by Jumppanen

Jumppanen was born on 17 July 1974 in Espoo, Finland. He began studies at the Sibelius Academy in 1992 and won first prize at the Maj Lind Competition in Helsinki in 1994. He continued his studies at the Basel Music Academy with Krystian Zimerman from 1997 to 2000. In 2000, he won the Young Concert Artists audition in New York City.

Jumppanen's recording career began with a 2005 recording of Pierre Boulez's three piano sonatas. He has subsequently recorded works by Beethoven, Debussy, Rautavaara, and other composers.

Jumppanen began serving as the artistic director of the Australian National Academy of Music in 2021.

== Discography ==
- Boulez: Piano Sonatas Nos 1–3 (Deutsche Grammophon, 2005)
- Rautavaara: Works for Violin and Piano (Ondine, 2011)
- Debussy: Préludes—Children's Corner (Ondine, 2018)
