= Phil Adams (cricketer) =

Australian cricketer

Personal information
- Full name: Philip James Adams
- Born: 5 February 1991 (age 35); Midland, Western Australia
- Batting: Right-handed
- Bowling: Right-arm leg-break
- Role: Batsman

Domestic team information
- Years: Team
- 2010/11: Western Australia

Career statistics
Competition	List A
Matches	2
Runs scored	10
Batting average	5.00
100s/50s	0/0
Top score	5
Catches/stumpings	2/–
- Source: CricketArchive, 14 December 2012

Philip James Adams (born 5 February 1991) is an Australian former cricketer who played at List A level for Western Australia.

== Early life ==
Adams was born in Midland, Western Australia, and attended John Forrest Senior High School's cricket academy.

He played cricket for Western Australia at both under-17s and under-19s levels, scoring 228 runs in seven matches at an average of 32.57 in the 2007–08 Under-17 Championship Series, and 343 runs in seven matches at an average of 85.75, with a highest score of 171, at the 2009–10 Australian Under-19 Championships. He was selected in the Team of the Championships for the under-19 championships and nominated in the provisional 30-man squad for the 2010 Under-19 World Cup.

== Cricket ==
Adams made his Futures League debut for the Western Australia Under-23s team against Queensland Under-23s during the 2009–10 season, scoring 117 not out on debut. He went on to make his limited-overs debut for Western Australia against South Australia in the 2010–11 Ryobi One-Day Cup, scoring five runs batting seventh. Adams played one further match at state level, against Tasmania, and was again dismissed for five runs, having opened the innings with Marcus Harris. At grade cricket level, he plays for Bayswater–Morley.
