= Adam Eckersley Band =

Australian musical group

- Origin: Central Coast, Australia
- Genres: Alternative, Indie
- Years active: 2010–present
- Labels: Lost Highway Australia, Island Records Australia
- Members: Adam Eckersley; Ben Elliott; Dan Biederman; Mitch Cairns
- Past members: Jason Bone; Scott Greenaway; Rudy Miranda; Duncan Toombs; Ammiel Warner
- Website: adameckersleyband.com

Adam Eckersley Band are a musical group based on The Central Coast, Australia, currently signed to Lost Highway Australia. The band formed in 2010 and, as of 2020, consists of members Adam Eckersley on lead vocals, electric guitar and harp, Ben Elliott on drums, Mitch Cairns on bass guitar and backing vocals and Dan Biederman on Hammond Organ and keyboard. Their debut album The First Album was released on 14 March 2014.

== Discography ==
=== Studio albums ===
Year	Album	Peak positions
Year	Album	AUS
2014	The First Album: Date released: 14 March 2014; Record label: Island Records Australia	52
2015	The Second Album: Date released: 28 August 2015; Record label: Lost Highway Records Australia	62

=== EPs ===
Year	Details
2013	Should've Known Better EP: Date released: 18 January 2013; Record label: Island Records Australia

== Awards and nominations ==
=== APRA Awards ===
The APRA Awards are presented annually from 1982 by the Australasian Performing Right Association (APRA), "honouring composers and songwriters".

Year	Nominee / work	Award	Result
2015	Adam Eckersley, Danelle Leverett and Jason Reeves	Country Work of the Year for "Give Her the World"	Won

=== CMAA Awards ===
The Country Music Awards of Australia are an annual awards ceremony held during the Tamworth Country Music Festival, in Tamworth, New South Wales, celebrating recording excellence in the Australian country music industry.

Year	Nominee / work	Award	Result
2015	Adam Eckersley Band	New Talent of the Year	Won
2016	The Second Album	Group or Duo of the Year	Won
