= Iain Grandage =

Australian composer and music director

Iain Andrew Grandage AM is an Australian composer and music director, best known for his compositions for theatre, dance and concert. In May 2018, the Perth Festival appointed Grandage as artistic director.

== Early life ==
Grandage initially lived in Brisbane, before moving to Perth when he was seven. Grandage studied at the UWA School of Music (now the UWA Conservatorium of Music) as a cellist, and also studied composition with Roger Smalley.

== Awards and honours ==
He has received the Helpmann Award for Best Original Score multiple times, for play Cloudstreet in 2002, play The Secret River in 2013, dance work When Time Stops in 2014, opera The Rabbits (with Kate Miller-Heidke) in 2015, and concert work Satan Jawa (with Rahayu Supanggah) in 2017.

Grandage received the Sidney Myer Performing Arts Award for an individual in 2012.

He delivered one of the 2024 Boyer Lectures.

In the 2025 King's Birthday Honours, Grandage was appointed a Member of the Order of Australia, for significant service to the arts as a composer and artistic director.
