= Julian Day (artist) =

Visual artist, composer and broadcaster

Julian Day is an Australian visual artist, composer and broadcaster. His artwork has featured at the 2017 California-Pacific Triennial at Orange County Museum of Art, the 8th Asia Pacific Triennial at the Queensland Gallery of Modern Art, Australian Centre for Contemporary Art (NEW16) and Museum of Contemporary Art Australia. He won the ARTAND Australia Credit Suisse Contemporary Art Award and the 2015 Fauvette Loureiro Memorial Artists Travel Scholarship from Sydney College of the Arts. His compositions have featured at Huddersfield Contemporary Music Festival, Bang on a Can Marathon, MATA Festival and Royal Academy of Music's Piano Festival. He performs as An Infinity Room (AIR), a project for multiple synthesizers, and co-directs the project Super Critical Mass which brings together 'temporary communities' to sound out locations using identical sound sources. As a broadcaster, he presented the long-running experimental music program New Music Up Late as well as Classic Breakfast and Afternoons on ABC Classic FM. He has also made programs for BBC Radio 3 and ABC Radio National.
