= Peter Sunman =

- Born: Peter R Sunman
- Genres: Classical, Jazz
- Instruments: Clarinet, Saxophone
- Years active: 1978-1990
- Formerly of: West Australian Symphony Orchestra

Peter Sunman is an Australian clarinetist, formerly the acting principal clarinetist of the West Australian Symphony Orchestra (WASO) between 1978 and 1990. He is a state examiner for the Western Australian branch of the Australian Music Examinations Board (AMEB). He was the senior music teacher at Guildford Grammar School in Perth, Western Australia. until early 2012, when he went into semi-retirement. Impressively, he has also been the Director of Music in Schools in Queensland (Trinity Anglican School, Cairns) and the United Kingdom (Godonstoun School, Scotland).

Sunman is a band and orchestral conductor, a frequent eisteddfod and festival adjudicator, and served on the Council for WAMTA. He has won the ABC's State Instrumental and Vocal Competition three times.

== Personal life ==
Peter Sunman was born in Wales, and moved to Australia when he was six. His son Alexander is an accomplished pianist, who has won the State Yamaha Piano Competition 3 times and has recently won the National Concerto and Vocal competition. Peter and Alexander have performed as a duo on numerous occasions. His father was an electrical engineer and a violin maker.
