= War Music (composition) =

Composition for choir and orchestra by James Ledger

War Music is a composition for choir and orchestra by the Australian composer James Ledger. The work was commissioned by the Sydney Symphony Orchestra to commemorate the centenary of the ANZAC landing at Gallipoli during World War I. The text was written by the Australian musician Paul Kelly. It was given its world premiere on April 22, 2015, at the Sydney Opera House by the Gondwana Chorale and the Sydney Symphony Orchestra under the conductor Richard Gill.

== Composition ==
War Music has duration of roughly 25 minutes and is composed in two movements. The first movement reflects the violence of the war, while the second is cast as memorial for those lost. Thus, the second movement features less of the orchestral instruments, but the addition of the choir. Ledger described the composition process in the score program notes, writing:

I was humbled on many occasions on writing a piece that commemorates those who were confronted by such a terrifying experience – I could only begin to imagine what it would have been like in reality. This produced the profound difficulty of trying to express the suffering and tragedy of war in purely musical terms. And added to this are the complexities of the myths and legends that surround the Gallipoli story. I therefore concentrated on the more broader aspects of war, hence the title.

The text was written by the Australian musician Paul Kelly during an otherwise inactive year and takes the perspective of the soldiers at Gallipoli.

=== Instrumentation ===
The work is scored for SATB choir and a large orchestra comprising three flutes (2nd doubling piccolo; 3rd doubling piccolo and alto flute), three oboes (3rd doubling cor anglais), two clarinets (2nd doubling bass clarinet), contrabass clarinet, two bassoons, contrabassoon, four horns, three trumpets, three trombones, tuba, four percussionists, celesta, and strings.

== Reception ==
War Music has been praised by music critics. Reviewing the world premiere, Peter McCallum of The Sydney Morning Herald described it as one of Ledger's "strongest scores" and remarked, "In the first part, ominous, sometimes militaristic ideas mixed with scattered sounds, bumps and fleeting fragments in finely textured music that loomed in waves towards peaks of intensity, serenity and portentousness. The second part brought in the voices of the Gondwana Centenary Chorale with guest members from France, Turkey and New Zealand for an intimate and anguished setting of a poem by Paul Kelly written as though through the voices of the slain." James McCarthy of Limelight similarly observed, "Ledger is resourceful enough to keep our interest, offering many rewards during the course of the work. With his imaginative orchestration, Mr. Ledger is becoming one of our best composers."

At a later performance by the New Zealand Symphony Orchestra and the New Zealand Youth Choir, William Dart of The New Zealand Herald wrote, "James Ledger's War Music took 20 minutes for its first movement to travel from brooding mysteries to full symphonic fury, with the musicians easily meeting the Australian's directives of 'bellicose and vehement.'" He continued, "Less belligerent, shorter and more affecting was the following movement in which the New Zealand Youth Choir added a skilfully layered setting of Paul Kelly's words, powerfully linking past and present, war and peace."
