= Frank Callaway =

New Zealand Australian music educator

Sir Frank Callaway AO CMG OBE (16 May 1919 – 22 February 2003) was an influential music educator and administrator. He was born in New Zealand but spent the major part of his life and career in Perth, Western Australia, where he built the UWA School of Music (later named the UWA Conservatorium of Music). He was one of the most highly honoured musicians and music educators in Australian history.

== Early life ==
Frank Adams Callaway was born in Timaru, New Zealand, the youngest of four children, and went to primary school at Lake Coleridge Power Station. After leaving Christchurch West High School at 15 due to the Great Depression, he joined a firm of commercial stationers. Night studies at Christchurch Technical College enabled him to gain a university entrance, and studied during evenings for a Bachelor of Commerce at Otago University at Dunedin.

== Start of musical career ==
In 1939 Callaway entered the Dunedin Teachers' Training College. At the outbreak of World War II a few months later he enlisted for overseas service, was rejected due to poor eyesight, but invited to join the full-time military band as a bassoonist. In 1942 he was appointed Head of Music at King Edward Technical College in Dunedin, where he also enrolled as a Bachelor of Music student. For eight years he was a part-time member of orchestras for the New Zealand Broadcasting Service. In 1947 a postgraduate travelling scholarship took him to study at the Royal Academy of Music in London, where he studied conducting, composition and general musicianship, and met Percy Grainger. He was also awarded a Carnegie Travel Grant to observe music education in the United States. He returned to King Edward Technical College as musical director in 1949.

== UWA ==
In 1953 Callaway took up the newly created position of Reader in Music in the University of Western Australia's faculty of education.

He started his work at the university with a piano and the Carnegie History of Music records. He had some music which he called "the library". He met Alice Ivy Wigmore and she gave him tens of thousands of pounds to buy music. Her money enabled him to purchase music and to fund the building of the Wigmore Music Library in memory of Wigmore's mother. "The Wigmore" is said to be "Australia's finest music library".

In 1959 Callaway became the University's Foundation Professor of Music when it moved into the Faculty of Arts. When he retired in 1984 the School of Music had 14 full-time staff-members and a large team of part-time teachers. Callaway played the violin, viola and bassoon, and conducted the University Choral Society,

== Other work ==
Callaway was a founding member of the International Society for Music Education shortly after World War II, became its president in 1988, and was later an Honorary President. He was President of the International Music Council. He created the Australian Society for Music Education in 1967. He helped create the Indian Ocean Arts Festival, held in Perth in 1979 and 1984. He was on the founding committee of the Commonwealth Assistance to Australian Composers scheme before its activities were absorbed into the Australia Council. He founded the Australian Journal of Music Education and co-founded musicological journal Studies in Music.

== Honours ==
- Officer of the Order of the British Empire (OBE; 1970, New Year's Honours)
- Companion of the Order of St Michael and St George (CMG; 1975 New Year's Honours)
- Knight Bachelor (1981, New Year's Honours)
- Officer of the Order of Australia (AO; 1995, Australia Day Honours), "in recognition of service to music education, particularly through the development of the Callaway International Resource Centre for Music Education"
- UNESCO Medal (1995)
- Centenary Medal (2001)
- Fellow of the Royal Academy of Music
- Percy Grainger International Medal
- honorary degrees in music (from Melbourne and UWA)

The Callaway Centre at UWA, a research and resource centre, is named for him, as is the main auditorium of the UWA School of Music (now the UWA Conservatorium of Music), The Callaway Auditorium.

== Family ==
Callaway married Kathleen and had two daughters and two sons. His hobbies were gardening and cricket.
