= Australian National Academy of Music =

Classical music training facility

- Established: 1994
- Faculty: 28
- Administrative staff: 23
- Students: 65–70
- Location: Melbourne, Victoria, Australia; 37°48′9″S 145°0′14″E
- Campus: Abbotsford Convent
- Website: www.anam.com.au

The Australian National Academy of Music (ANAM) is a classical music performance training facility situated in Melbourne.

== History ==
ANAM was established in 1994, as part of prime minister Paul Keating's "Creative Nation" initiative.

On 23 October 2008, the Minister for the Arts, Peter Garrett, announced that ANAM would not receive any government funding in 2009.

Former artistic director Nick Deutsch was appointed in 2016 and past artistic directors include composer Brett Dean and clarinettist Paul Dean.

In 2021, Paavali Jumppanen was appointed as artistic director.

== Description, governance and funding ==
ANAM is a national organisation with students from across Australia and New Zealand. Since 2020 located at the Abbotsford Convent in Abbotsford, Melbourne, it is a member of the Australian Roundtable for Arts Training Excellence (ARTS8), and partially funded by the Australian Government through the Office for the Arts.

== Activities ==
=== Education ===
ANAM's Professional Performance Program is for students wishing to study their instrument in the following categories: strings, woodwind, brass, percussion, and keyboard instruments. From 2012, ANAM offered a master's degree delivered in collaboration with Queensland Conservatorium Griffith University, along with fellowship and short course opportunities.

=== Competitions ===
In 2016, Musica Viva took over co-management of the Melbourne International Chamber Music Competition, together with Melbourne Recital Centre and ANAM.

== Awards and nominations ==
The ARIA Music Awards is an annual awards ceremony that recognises excellence, innovation, and achievement across all genres of Australian music. They commenced in 1987.

Year	Nominee / work	Award	Result	Ref.
2013	Conversations with Ghosts (with Paul Kelly, James Ledger and Genevieve Lacey)	Best Original Soundtrack, Cast or Show Album	Won	
