= Fifa Riccobono =

Australian business person

Crocifissa Fifa Riccobono AM is a music industry consultant and former recording industry executive best known for her time as CEO of Albert Music in Australia.

== Career ==
Riccobono has been in the music industry for over 40 years starting at J. Albert & Son Pty Ltd (Alberts) becoming chief executive officer of the company in 1990, the first woman to do so in Australia. She was a key figure in the development of Australian bands including AC/DC, The Angels, Rose Tattoo, and Ted Mulry Gang. When appointed as CEO she was one of a small group of women internationally that held senior positions at record companies.

AC/DC founder and guitarist Malcolm Young once said that Riccobono "was always there, from the first day really" and Herm Kovak from the Ted Mulry Gang noted that "Ted Albert and Fifa Riccobono really cared about their acts."

Riccobono had a role in developing the music-based charity Nordoff-Robbins Music Therapy and was director of APRA. She is now an independent consultant to the industry. At the APRA Music Awards of 2015 she received the Ted Albert Award for services to music.
