= Adam Eckersley (musician) =

Australian musician

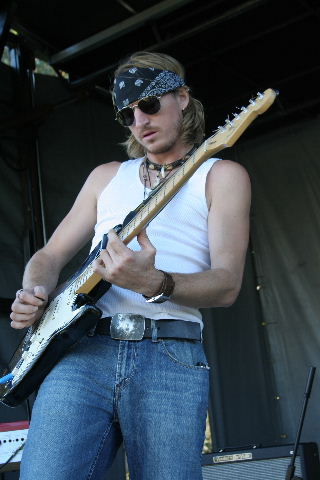

Background information
- Born: 4 April 1982 (age 44)
- Origin: Grafton, Australia
- Genres: blues, rock, acoustic
- Occupations: Musician, songwriter
- Instruments: Vocals; guitar; harmonica
- Label: Universal Music Australia
- Spouse: Brooke McClymont
- Website: brookeandadam.com

Adam Eckersley is a singer, guitarist and songwriter from Grafton, Australia. He is the former vocalist and lead guitarist of award-winning blues band Bluezone, which have since disbanded. He has also been recently been signed to Universal Music Australia, Eckersley is married to fellow musician, Australian country music singer–songwriter Brooke McClymont, of The McClymonts.

== Early life and education ==
Born and raised in Grafton, Australia and later moved to Tamworth, New South Wales after graduating from Mcauley Catholic College in 1999 along with his two brothers, Mark and Ryan. Eckersley currently resides on the Mid North Coast, New South Wales.

== Career ==
Eckersley has been playing professionally for many years and was the 2008 ambassador for the Australian Blues Music Festival. Eckersley is sponsored by Fender Australia and Lee Oskar Harmonicas. Having played at some of the countries leading blues festivals including the Byron Bay Blues & Roots Festival and the Darling Harbour Jazz Festival, he has also shared the stage with Australia's most revered guitarists such as; Phil Emmanuel, Mal Eastick, Phil Manning & Matt Taylor from Chain, Kevin Borich, and Izzy Ismanovich of The Screaming Jets.

In early 2010, Eckersley formed the 5-piece band Adam Eckersley Band (A.E.B.), consisting of Adam Eckersley, Jason Bone, Rudy Miranda, Ammiel Warner and Scott Greenway, they are now touring extensively throughout New South Wales. The release of their EP and first studio album has been met with positive feedback and sales, which also includes cover art designed by Eckersley.

Eckersley accompanied The McClymonts on their extensive 2011 US tour, performing alongside them as rhythm guitarist, while also developing A.E.B.

In mid 2012, Eckersley received much interest from key figures within Universal Music Australia after seeing him perform in one of The McClymonts music videos. Soon after, Eckersley was signed to his first major label and writing music with numerous notable artists such as Keith Peterik, and Keith Burns to develop his new album under Universal Music Australia's banner.

On 30 June 2023, Eckersley and McClymont released their second album Up, Down & Sideways.

McClymont and Eckersley will appear on the eighth season of The Amazing Race Australia in 2024.

The third Brooke McClymont & Adam Eckersley album Souls on Show is scheduled for release on 28 August 2026.

== Discography ==
=== Albums ===
List of studio albums, with selected chart positions
Title	Album details	Peak chart positions
Title	Album details	AUS
Adam & Brooke (as Adam Eckersley & Brooke McClymont)	Released: 9 February 2018; Label: Lost Highway, Universal; Formats: CD, digital download, streaming	16
Up, Down & Sideways (as Adam Eckersley & Brooke McClymont)	Released: 30 June 2023; Label: Lost Highway, Universal; Formats: CD, digital download, streaming	26
Souls on Show (as Adam Eckersley & Brooke McClymont)	Released: 28 August 2026; Label: Lost Highway, Universal; Formats: CD, digital download, streaming	12

== Awards and nominations ==
=== ARIA Music Awards ===
The ARIA Music Awards are a set of annual ceremonies presented by Australian Recording Industry Association (ARIA), which recognise excellence, innovation, and achievement across all genres of the music of Australia. They commenced in 1987.

Year	Nominee / work	Award	Result	Ref.
2018	Adam & Brooke (with Brooke McClymont)	Best Country Album	Nominated	
2023	Up, Down & Sideways (with Brooke McClymont)	Best Country Album	Nominated	

=== Country Music Awards of Australia ===
The Country Music Awards of Australia is an annual awards night held in January during the Tamworth Country Music Festival. Celebrating recording excellence in the Australian country music industry. They commenced in 1973.

Year	Nominee / work	Award	Result	Ref.
2019	"Train Wreck" (with Brooke McClymont)	Song of the Year	Nominated	
2019	"Train Wreck" (with Brooke McClymont)	Single of the Year	Nominated	
2019	Adam & Brooke	Group or Duo of the Year	Nominated	
2019	Adam & Brooke (with Brooke McClymont)	Contemporary Country Album of the Year	Nominated	
2021	"Remedy" (with Brad Cox)	Vocal Collaboration of the Year	Nominated	
2023	"Memory Lane" (with Brooke McClymont)	Single of the Year	Won	
2023	"Star of the Show" (with Brooke McClymont) (Directed by Brad Murnane)	Video of the Year	Nominated	
2023	"Star of the Show" (with Brooke McClymont)	Song of the Year	Won	
2023	Brooke McClymont & Adam Eckersley	Group or Duo of the Year	Won	
2024	Up, Down & Sideways (with Adam Eckersley)	Album of the Year	Nominated	
2024	Up, Down & Sideways (with Adam Eckersley)	Contemporary Country Album of the Year	Nominated	
2024	"What Are You Waiting For" (with Brooke McClymont)	Single of the Year	Nominated	
2024	"Country Music, You and Beer" (with Brooke McClymont)	Song of the Year	Nominated	
2024	Brooke McClymont & Adam Eckersley	Group or Duo of the Year	Nominated	
2025	"What Are You Waiting For" (with Brooke McClymont)	Video of the Year	Pending	
2027	"In and Out of Love" (with Brooke McClymont)	Song of the Year	Pending	
2027	"In and Out of Love" (with Brooke McClymont)	Single of the Year	Pending	
2027	"Souls On Show" (with Brooke McClymont)	Video of the Year	Pending	
2027	Brooke McClymont & Adam Eckersley	Group or Duo of the Year	Pending	
2027	Souls On Show (with Brooke McClymont)	Contemporary Country Album of the Year	Pending	
2027	Souls On Show (with Brooke McClymont)	Album of the Year	Pending	

== See also ==
- Adam Eckersley Band
