= Roger Smalley =

Australian musician (1943–2015)

John Roger Smalley AM (26 July 1943 – 18 August 2015) was an Anglo-Australian composer, pianist and conductor. Professor Smalley was a senior honorary research fellow at the School of Music, University of Western Australia in Perth and honorary research associate at the University of Sydney.

== Biography ==
Smalley was born in Swinton, Lancashire, England. He studied at the Royal College of Music in London with Antony Hopkins (piano), Peter Racine Fricker and John White (both composition). In addition, he studied with Alexander Goehr at Morley College, and attended Karlheinz Stockhausen's Cologne Course for New Music in 1965–66, as well as Pierre Boulez's Darmstadt summer course in 1965.

As a young composer, he was awarded the 1965 Royal Philharmonic Society Prize for his orchestral work Gloria Tibi Trinitas.

Smalley was appointed in 1967 as the first Composer in Residence at King's College, Cambridge. In 1969 Smalley and his successor at King's, Tim Souster, formed the live-electronic group Intermodulation. Over the next six years Intermodulation toured widely in the UK, West Germany, Poland, France and Iran, with a repertoire which included not only works by Souster and Smalley, but also music by Cornelius Cardew, Terry Riley, Frederic Rzewski, Karlheinz Stockhausen, Christian Wolff and others. Intermodulation also appeared on the occasions at the BBC Promenade Concerts, where among other works it performed Smalley's Beat Music for electronic ensemble and orchestra, and his Monody for piano and electronics (1974).

In 1974 Smalley was invited to take up a three-month residency at the University of Western Australia. He returned two years later to take up a permanent position at the university's music school. Basing himself in Australia, he took Australian citizenship in 1990. On his retirement in 2007, Smalley was named Emeritus Professor at UWA.

Roger Smalley was awarded the Centenary Medal in 2001 and appointed a Member of the Order of Australia in the Australia Day Honours of 2011.

Smalley died at the age of 72 on 18 August 2015, after a long struggle with Parkinson's disease; at its onset he regretted that he could no longer play the piano, noting that "I know what I have to play, but my fingers won't let me do it".

Smalley was married to Sarah Roe, from whom he was later divorced; they had two children.

== Music ==
Smalley's compositions have been performed and broadcast worldwide. He received commissions from many organisations including the BBC, ABC Television, West German Radio, Perth International Arts Festival, London Sinfonietta, Australian Chamber Orchestra, Australian String Quartet, Grainger Quartet, Fires of London, Flederman, Nova Ensemble, Seymour Group and Australia Ensemble. His works and performances feature on over 20 commercially released CDs, among them ABC Classics, Tall Poppies and Melba Recordings.

His first Piano Concerto, a BBC commission for European Music Year (1985), was the recommended work in the annual UNESCO International Rostrum of Composers in 1987, the first time an Australian entry succeeded to first place.

In his later works, Smalley often incorporated fragments of music by Romantic composers into his works. Examples include Chopin in the Oboe Concerto, Schumann in the Cello Concerto, and Brahms in the Piano Quartet Crepuscule. The String Quartet No. 2 (2000) and the Piano Quintet (2003) incorporate melodies from mazurkas by Chopin.

Smalley's orchestral piece Birthday Tango (later retitled Footwork) received the APRA Classical Music Award 2007 in the category "Best Composition by an Australian Composer". These awards are presented annually by the Australasian Performing Right Association (APRA) and Australian Music Centre (AMC).

In addition to his work as a composer, Smalley was recognised as a distinguished pianist, especially noted for his performance of contemporary as well as 18th and 19th century music. Early in his career he was a prizewinner in the Gaudeamus Competition for interpreters of contemporary music (1966) and won the Harriet Cohen Award for contemporary music performance in 1968.

His recordings include a CD of piano music by Australian composers, his work with the Australian Piano Quartet, a selection of the sonatas of John White, and another of song cycles by Schumann.

== Works ==
Works by Roger Smalley include:

- Echo II for cello and digital delays (1978)
- Pulses for 5x4 players
- Symphony (1979–81)
- Piano Concerto No. 1 (1984–85)
- Variations on a Theme of Chopin for piano (1988–89)
- Piano Trio (1990–91)
- Poles Apart (1992)
- Trio for clarinet, viola and piano (1992, revised 1999)
- Oboe Concerto (1995–96)
- Crepuscule, for piano quartet (1998–99)
- String Quartet No. 2 (1999–2000)
- Horn Trio (2000–2002)
- Piano Quintet (2003)
- Piano Concerto No. 2 (2004)
- Contrabassoon Concerto
- Suite for two violins (2007)

== Awards ==
=== Don Banks Music Award ===
The Don Banks Music Award was established in 1984 to publicly honour a senior artist of high distinction who has made an outstanding and sustained contribution to music in Australia. It was founded by the Australia Council in honour of Don Banks, Australian composer, performer and the first chair of its music board.

Year	Nominee / work	Award	Result
1994	Roger Smalley	Don Banks Music Award	Won

== See also ==
- International Society for Music Education
