= West Australian Symphony Orchestra =

Symphony orchestra from Perth, Western Australia

- Orchestra
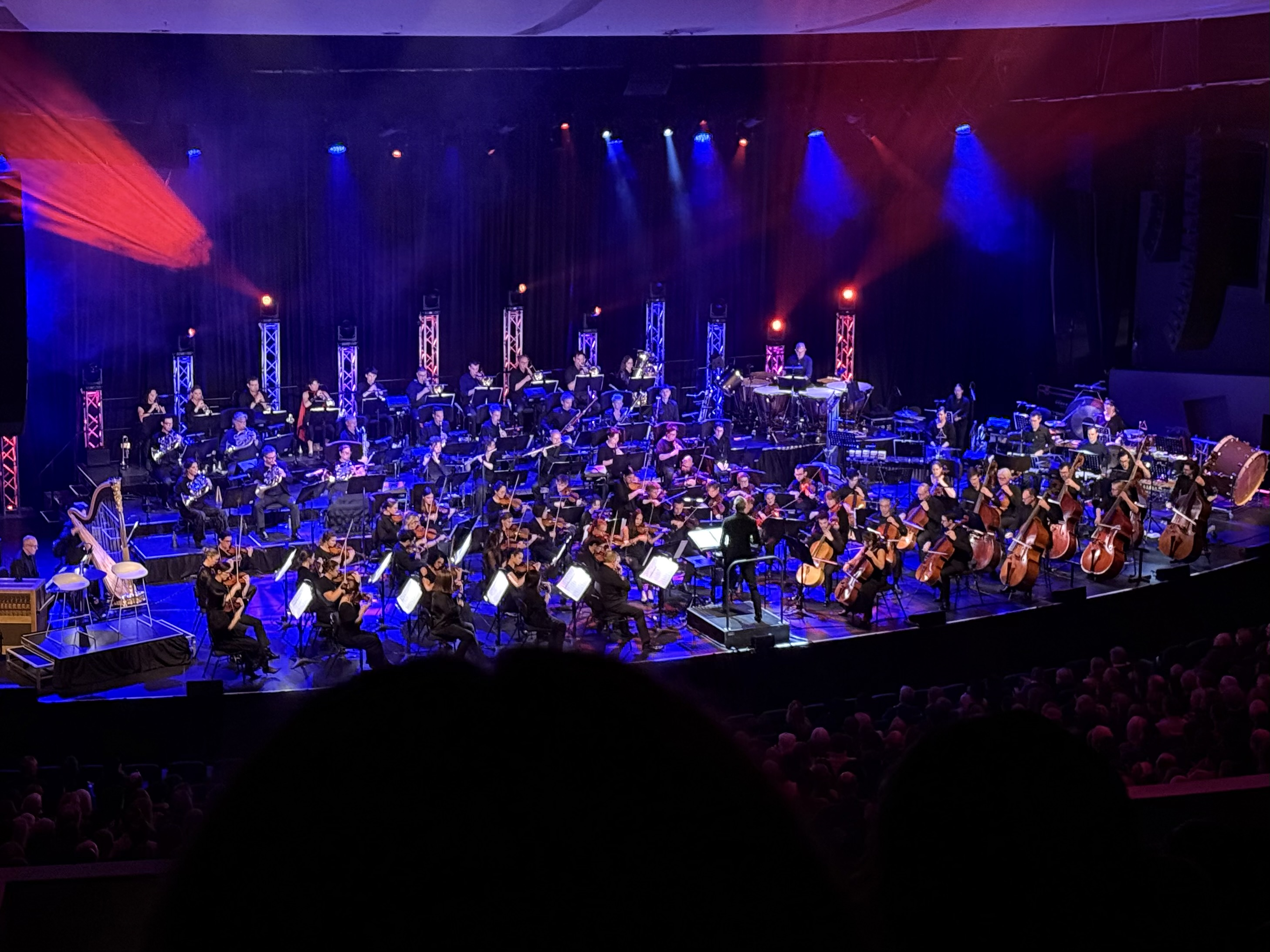
- WASO performing in June 2025
- Short name: WASO
- Former name: Perth Symphony Orchestra
- Founded: 1928; 98 years ago
- Location: Perth
- Principal conductor: Asher Fisch
- Concertmaster: Laurence Jackson
- Website: www.waso.com.au

The West Australian Symphony Orchestra (WASO) is an Australian symphony orchestra based in Perth, Western Australia. Its principal concert venue was the Perth Concert Hall until the venue was closed for renovations in 2024. WASO now performs in various venues including Winthrop Hall, Heath Ledger Theatre, Studio Underground, His Majesty's Theatre, Government House Ballroom and Riverside Theatre. As of March 2012, WASO has a roster of 79 full-time musicians and presents over 170 performances a year throughout the state. The orchestra has an affiliated WASO chorus.

== History ==
In the winter of 1921, weekly concerts by a Perth Symphony Orchestra, conducted by Harold Betteridge and led by Lionel Hart, were advertised in the local newspaper, but the life of this group was brief. In 1928, many professional musicians who had supported the silent movies found themselves out of work, and – under the direction of Harold Newton – formed the Perth Symphony Orchestra. The first performance by this group of professional players was given in the Hoyts Regent Theatre (formerly known as Queen's Hall) on 16 September 1928. By 1930, the orchestra not only gave concerts in the Queen's Hall but also presented ten subscription concerts in the Perth Town Hall. Many of these concerts were broadcast over the radio station 6WF.

In 1932, the Australian Broadcasting Commission (ABC) was formed, and part of its charter was to establish broadcast orchestras in each state. In Western Australia, it formed the Western Studio Orchestra of fifteen players, conducted by Nelson Burton. The Perth Symphony Orchestra, conducted by George Reid, was giving regular concerts in His Majesty's Theatre.

In 1936, the ABC introduced Celebrity Subscription Concerts, and artists and conductors – many from overseas – were engaged. The concerts were performed initially in His Majesty's Theatre and then later in the Capitol Theatre and Winthrop Hall at the University of Western Australia. The Western Studio Orchestra became the Perth Concert orchestra, and this orchestra was later augmented for the celebrity concerts and became known as the ABC (Perth) Symphony Orchestra. By 1937, the letters "ABC" had been dropped from the title and the orchestra once again became known as the Perth Symphony Orchestra.

In 1950, the government of the day, with other municipal bodies, made funds available to subsidise the existing ABC Orchestra. By the end of that year, the West Australian Symphony Orchestra was born, boasting forty permanent members. In 1997, the ABC divested all ABC orchestras from the Concerts department of the ABC into separate subsidiary companies, including a service company known as Symphony Australia. The West Australian Symphony was incorporated in January 1998. Since corporatising, the orchestra has diversified its performances, expanding on its summer outdoor season and taking music to many parts of the community. It has a creative partnership with the West Australian Opera and the West Australian Ballet.

WASO principal conductors have included Henry Krips (1948–1971), Tibor Paul (1971–1973), David Measham (1974–1981), and Jorge Mester (1991–1994). Measham took the orchestra on its first overseas tour, to Singapore, and to the Sydney Festival. In 1975, he instigated the inaugural indoor season of three Promenade Concerts, modelled after The Proms, as part of the Perth International Arts Festival. Measham also held the title of principal guest conductor from 1981 to 1986. Vladimir Verbitsky became principal guest conductor in 1992 and conductor laureate in 1997.

Matthias Bamert was chief conductor from 2003 to 2006. His initial contract with WASO was through 2007, but dissatisfaction with his tenure caused the orchestra to terminate his contract 18 months early, in May 2006. In May 2007, WASO named Paul Daniel its principal conductor, effective as of January 2009. He had made his guest conducting debut with the WASO in 1995, and returned in April 2006. In November 2010, the WASO announced the extension of Daniel's contract as principal conductor through December 2013, at which time his tenure concluded. In May 2012, WASO announced the appointment of Asher Fisch as its newest principal conductor, effective 1 January 2014, with an initial contract of three years. In September 2015, the WASO announced the extension of Fisch's contract and he remains in the role as of 2023. With the WASO, Fisch has recorded the symphonies of Brahms.

== Principal conductors ==
- 1951–1954: Rudolf Pekarek
- 1955–1965: John Farnsworth Hall
- 1965–1970: Thomas Mayer
- 1971–1973: Tibor Paul
- 1975–1981: David Measham
- 1982–1985: Albert Rosen
- 1991–1993: Jorge Mester
- 1994–1997: Vernon Handley
- 2003–2006: Matthias Bamert
- 2009–2013: Paul Daniel
- 2014: Asher Fisch

== Awards and nominations ==
=== APRA-AMC Art Music Awards ===
The APRA-AMC Art Music Awards (previously Classical Music Awards) are presented annually by Australasian Performing Right Association (APRA), Australasian Mechanical Copyright Owners Society (AMCOS) and Australian Music Centre (AMC) since 2002. They "honour the achievements of composers, performers and industry specialists in the contemporary classical genre."

Year	Recipient / Nominated work	Award	Result	Ref.
2004	This Insubstantial Pageant (Gordon Kerry) – West Australian Symphony Orchestra	Orchestral Work of the Year	Won	
2004	West Australian Symphony Orchestra	Most Distinguished Contribution to the Presentation of Australian Composition by an Organisation	Won	
2005	The Dischord Hunter – West Australian Symphony Orchestra, Education Chamber Orchestra (WASO EChO)	Outstanding Contribution to Australian Music in Education	Won	
2006	Line Drawing (James Ledger) – Genevieve Lacey, West Australian Symphony	Best Performance of an Australian Composition	Won	
2008	Trumpet Concerto (James Ledger) – West Australian Symphony Orchestra, David Elton (trumpet), Sachio Fujioka (conductor)	Orchestral Work of the Year	Nominated	
2008	Concerto Project – West Australian Symphony Orchestra	Outstanding Contribution by an Organisation	Nominated	
2009	Symphony No. 7 Scenes from Daily Life (Carl Vine) – West Australian Symphony Orchestra	Best Performance of an Australian Composition	Won	
2011	A Dream of Drowning (Andrew Ford / Tim Winton) – West Australian Symphony Orchestra, Teddy Tahu Rhodes (soloist), Paul Daniel (conductor)	Work of the Year – Orchestral	Nominated	
2011	Chronicles (James Ledger) – West Australian Symphony Orchestra, Paul Daniel (conductor)	Work of the Year – Orchestral	Won	
2012	Spirit Ground (Ross Edwards) – West Australian Symphony Orchestra, Margaret Blades (soloist)	Work of the Year – Orchestral	Nominated	
2012	Two Memorials for Anton Webern and John Lennon (James Ledger) – West Australian Symphony Orchestra, Paul Daniel (conductor)	Performance of the Year	Won	
2014	Golden Years (James Ledger) – Margaret Blades (soloist), West Australian Symphony Orchestra, Otto Tausk (conductor)	Work of the Year – Orchestral	Won	
2014	West Australian Symphony Orchestra – 2013 education program	Award for Excellence in Music Education	Nominated	
2015	"Concerto for clarinet and orchestra" (Lachlan Skipworth) – West Australian Symphony Orchestra, Ashley Smith (soloist), Baldur Brönnimann (conductor)	Orchestral Work of the Year	Nominated	
2015	"Concerto for clarinet and orchestra" (Lachlan Skipworth) – West Australian Symphony Orchestra, Ashley Smith (soloist), Baldur Brönnimann (conductor)	Performance of the Year	Won	
2015	"Concerto for Orchestra" (Carl Vine) – West Australian Symphony Orchestra, Michael Stern (conductor)	Performance of the Year	Nominated	
2017	West Australian Symphony Orchestra – 2016 education program	Award for Excellence in Music Education	Nominated	
2018	"Concerto for Trombone and Orchestra" (Paul Stanhope) – Joshua Davis (trombone), West Australian Symphony Orchestra, Asher Fisch (conductor)	Orchestral Work of the Year	Won	
2018	Spiritus (Lachlan Skipworth) – West Australian Symphony Orchestra, Daniel Blendulf (conductor)	Orchestral Work of the Year	Nominated	
2018	Maali, op. 101 – "Concerto for oboe, clarinet, bassoon and horn with orchestra" (Andrew Schultz) – West Australian Symphony Orchestra and soloists; Simone Young (conductor)	Performance of the Year	Nominated	
2019	Crescendo – West Australian Symphony Orchestra	Excellence in Music Education	Won	
2019	Implacable Gifts (Concerto for Two Pianos and Orchestra) (Carl Vine) – West Australian Symphony Orchestra	Orchestral Work of the Year	Won	
2022	Hymns for End Times (Rachael Dease) – West Australian Symphony Orchestra	Performance of the Year: Notated Composition	Nominated	

=== ARIA Music Awards ===
The ARIA Music Awards is an annual awards ceremony that recognises excellence, innovation, and achievement across all genres of Australian music. They commenced in 1987.

Year	Nominee / work	Award	Result	Ref.
1993	The Transposed Heads	Best Classical Album	Nominated	
2026	Empire of the Sun, West Australian Symphony Orchestra and Billy-Jo Shoveller – Tourism WA: "Walking on a Dream" (The Brand Agency)	Best Use of an Australian Recording in an Advertisement	Nominated	

== See also ==
- Perth Symphony Orchestra
- Symphony Australia
