= Vance Joy discography =

Discography of the Australian indie pop singer

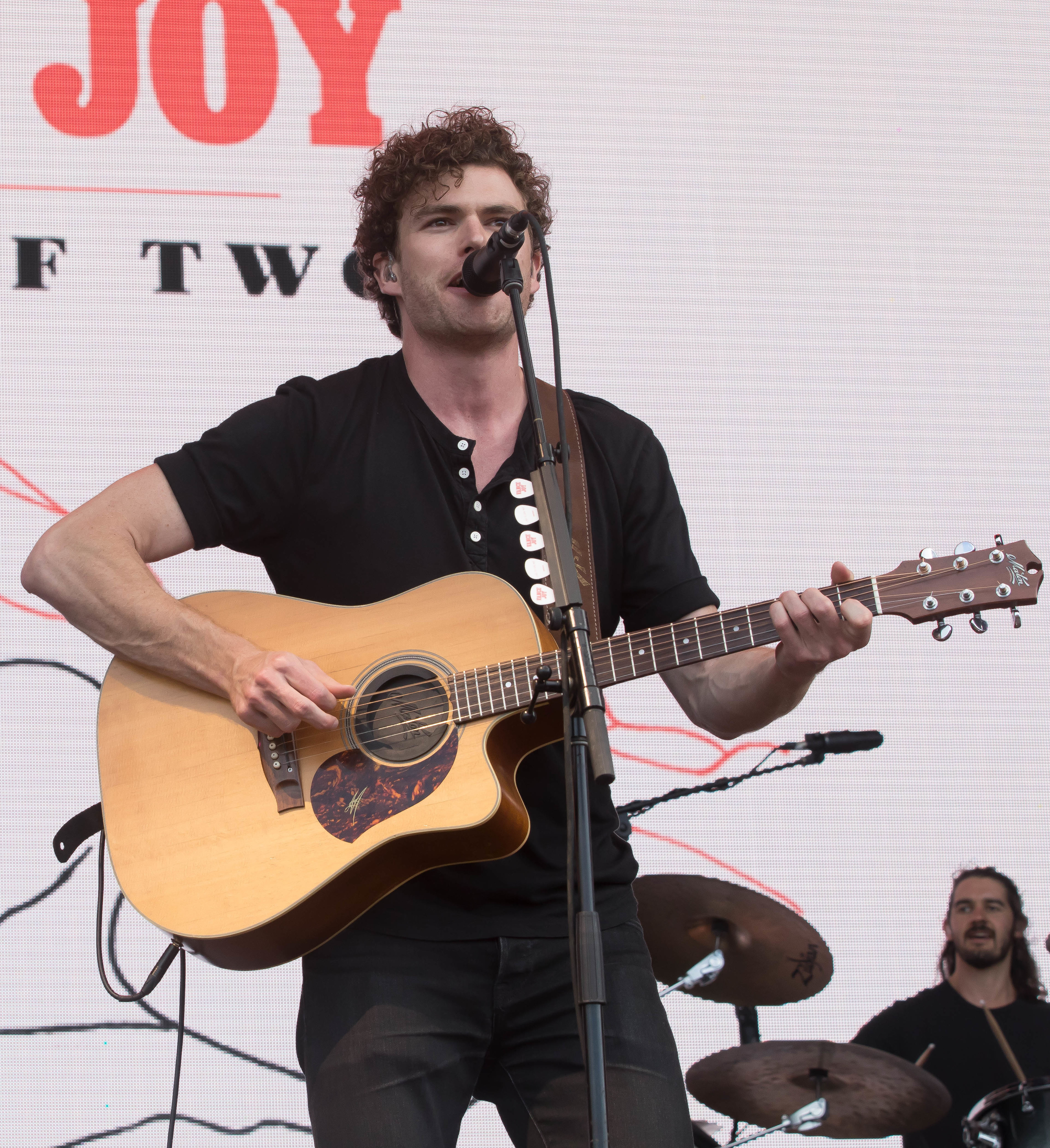
- Joy performing in 2018
- Studio albums: 3
- EPs: 1
- Live albums: 2
- Singles: 22
- Music videos: 19

Australian indie pop singer Vance Joy, has released three studio albums, two live albums, one extended play and twenty two singles.

== Albums ==
=== Studio albums ===
List of singles, with year released, selected chart positions and certifications, and album name shown
| Title | Details | Peak positions | | | | | | | | | | Certifications |
| Title | Details | AUS | BEL | CAN | IRE | NL | NZ | SWE | SWI | UK | US | Certifications |
|---|---|---|---|---|---|---|---|---|---|---|---|---|
| Dream Your Life Away | Released: 5 September 2014; Label: Liberation, Warner, Atlantic; Format: CD, LP, digital download | 1 | 94 | 2 | 26 | 130 | 40 | 13 | 23 | 20 | 17 | ARIA: 2× Platinum; BPI: Gold; MC: 3× Platinum; RIAA: 2× Platinum; RMNZ: 3× Platinum |
| Nation of Two | Released: 23 February 2018; Label: Liberation, Warner, Atlantic; Formats: CD, LP, digital download | 1 | 70 | 2 | 22 | 35 | 20 | 37 | 35 | 32 | 10 | ARIA: Platinum; MC: Platinum; RMNZ: Platinum |
| In Our Own Sweet Time | Released: 10 June 2022; Label: Liberation, Warner, Atlantic; Formats: CD, LP, digital download | 3 | — | 21 | — | — | 40 | — | 91 | — (Note: In Our Own Sweet Time did not enter the UK Albums Chart, but peaked at number 40 on the UK Album Downloads Chart.) | — (Note: In Our Own Sweet Time did not enter the Billboard 200, but peaked at number 81 on the Billboard Top Album Sales Chart.) | ARIA: Silver; RMNZ: Gold |
"—" denotes a recording that did not chart or was not released in that territory.

=== Live albums ===
List of live albums, with release date and label shown
| Title | Details |
|---|---|
| Live at Red Rocks Amphitheatre | Released: 16 November 2018; Label: Liberation Music; Format: LP, Digital download, streaming |
| Live at the Sydney Opera House | Released: 14 April 2023; Label: Liberation Music; Format: digital download, streaming |

== Extended plays ==
List of EPs, with release date, selected chart positions, certifications, and label shown
| Title | Details | Peak chart positions | Certifications |
| Title | Details | US Heat. | Certifications |
|---|---|---|---|
| God Loves You When You're Dancing | Released: 22 March 2013; Label: Liberation Music; Format: Digital download, LP | 13 | MC: Platinum; RIAA: Gold |

== Singles ==
List of singles, with year released, selected chart positions and certifications, and album name shown
| Title | Year | Peak chart positions | | | | | | | | | | Certifications | Album |
| Title | Year | AUS | CAN | CZ | IRE | NED | SWE | SWI | UK | US | WW | Certifications | Album |
|---|---|---|---|---|---|---|---|---|---|---|---|---|---|
| "From Afar" | 2013 | — | — | — | — | — | — | — | — | — | — | ARIA: Platinum | God Loves You When You're Dancing |
| "Riptide" | 2013 | 6 | 13 | 4 | 7 | 25 | 18 | 16 | 10 | 30 | 53 | ARIA: 16× Platinum; MC: Diamond; IFPI SWE: Platinum; IFPI SWI: Gold; BPI: 8× Platinum; RIAA: Diamond; RMNZ: 12× Platinum | God Loves You When You're Dancing |
| "Mess Is Mine" | 2014 | 33 | — | 38 | 91 | — | 95 | — | — | — | — | ARIA: 4× Platinum; BPI: Gold; MC: 2× Platinum; RIAA: 2× Platinum; RMNZ: 2× Platinum | Dream Your Life Away |
| "First Time" | 2014 | 95 | — (Note: "First Time" did not enter the Billboard Canadian Hot 100, but peaked at number 66 on the Canadian Digital Song Sales chart.) | — | — | — | — | — (Note: "First Time" did not enter the Swiss Singles chart, but charted at number 99 on the Swiss Airplay chart.) | — | — | — | | Dream Your Life Away |
| "Georgia" | 2015 | 15 | — | — | — | — | — | — | — | — | — | ARIA: 5× Platinum; BPI: Gold; MC: 2× Platinum; RIAA: Platinum; RMNZ: 2× Platinum | Dream Your Life Away |
| "Fire and the Flood" | 2015 | 6 | 67 | — | — | — | — | — | — | — | — | ARIA: 5× Platinum; MC: 2× Platinum; RIAA: Platinum; RMNZ: Platinum | Dream Your Life Away (Deluxe edition) |
| "Straight into Your Arms" | 2016 | 56 | — | — | — | — | — | — | — | — | — | | Dream Your Life Away (Deluxe edition) |
| "Lay It on Me" | 2017 | 18 | — (Note: "Lay It on Me" did not enter the Billboard Canadian Hot 100, but peaked at number 38 on the Canadian Digital Song Sales chart.) | — | — | — (Note: "Lay It on Me" did not enter the Netherlands' Single Top 100 but peaked on the Netherlands' Single Tip Chart at number 11.) | — | — | — | — | — | ARIA: 4× Platinum; MC: 2× Platinum; RIAA: Gold; RMNZ: Platinum | Nation of Two |
| "Like Gold" | 2017 | 124 | — | — | — | — | — | — | — | — | — | ARIA: Platinum; RMNZ: Gold | Nation of Two |
| "We're Going Home" | 2018 | 16 | — | — | — | — | — | — | — | — | — | ARIA: 3× Platinum; RMNZ: Gold | Nation of Two |
| "Saturday Sun" | 2018 | 47 | — | — | — | — | — | — | — | — | — | ARIA: 3× Platinum; RIAA: Gold; RMNZ: Platinum | Nation of Two |
| "Call If You Need Me" | 2018 | 145 | — | — | — | — | — | — | — | — | — | ARIA: Gold | Nation of Two |
| "I'm with You" | 2018 | 97 | — | — | — | — | — | — | — | — | — | ARIA: Platinum; RMNZ: Platinum | Nation of Two |
| "You" (with Benny Blanco and Marshmello) | 2021 | 55 | 62 | — | 77 | — (Note: "You" did not enter the Netherlands' Single Top 100 but peaked on the Netherlands' Single Tip Chart at number 22.) | 38 | — (Note: "You" did not enter the Swiss Singles chart, but charted at number 69 on the Swiss Airplay chart.) | — | — | 167 | | Friends Keep Secrets 2 |
| "Missing Piece" | 2021 | 14 | 69 | 37 | — | — | — | — (Note: "Missing Piece" did not enter the Swiss Singles chart, but charted at number 12 on the Swiss Airplay chart.) | — | — | — | ARIA: 2× Platinum; BPI: Silver; MC: Platinum; RIAA: Gold; RMNZ: Platinum | In Our Own Sweet Time |
| "Don't Fade" | 2022 | — (Note: "Don't Fade" did not enter the ARIA Top 100 Singles Chart, but peaked at number 6 on the Australian Independent Label Singles.) | — | — | — | — | — | — | — | — | — | | In Our Own Sweet Time |
| "Clarity" | 2022 | 41 | — | — | — | — | — | — (Note: "Clarity" did not enter the Swiss Singles chart, but charted at number 80 on the Swiss Airplay chart.) | — | — | — | ARIA: Platinum; RMNZ: Gold | In Our Own Sweet Time |
| "Every Side of You" | 2022 | — | — | — | — | — | — | — | — | — | — | | In Our Own Sweet Time |
| "Catalonia" | 2022 | — | — | — | — | — | — | — | — | — | — | | In Our Own Sweet Time |
| "Everybody Needs Someone" (with Noah Cyrus) | 2023 | — | — | — | — | — | — | — | — | — | — | | Non-album single |
| "Rock It" | 2023 | — | — | — | — | — | — | — | — | — | — | | Mushroom: Fifty Years of Making Noise (Reimagined) |
| "Wherever You Are" (with Shouse) | 2025 | — | — | — | — | — | — | — | — | — | — | | Collective Ecstasy |
| "Divine Feelings" | 2025 | — (Note: "Divine Feelings" did not enter the ARIA Top 100 Singles Chart, but peaked at number 10 on the Australian Artist Chart.) | — | — | — | — | — | — | — | — | — | | Non-album singles |
| "Fascination in the Dark" | 2025 | — | — | — | — | — | — | — | — | — | — | | Non-album singles |
"—" denotes single that did not chart or was not released.

== Other charted and certified songs ==
List of non-single chart appearances, with selected chart positions, certifications and album name shown
| Title | Year | Peak chart positions | | | Certifications | Album |
| Title | Year | AUS | CAN | US Rock | Certifications | Album |
|---|---|---|---|---|---|---|
| "Emmylou" | 2013 | — | — | — | ARIA: Gold | God Loves You When You're Dancing |
| "Play with Fire" | 2013 | — | — | — | ARIA: Gold | God Loves You When You're Dancing |
| "Wasted Time" | 2014 | 43 | 50 | 27 | | Dream Your Life Away |
| "My Kind of Man" | 2014 | 82 | — | — | | Dream Your Life Away |
| "Take Your Time" | 2018 | — | — | 39 | | Nation of Two |
| "Alone with Me" | 2018 | — | — | 49 | | Nation of Two |
"—" denotes single that did not chart or was not released.

== Guest appearances ==
| Title | Year | Other artist(s) | Album |
|---|---|---|---|
| "La Mer" | 2013 | Various | Mélodie Française |

== Music videos ==
List of music videos, with year released and director(s) shown
| Title | Year | Director(s) |
As lead artist
| "From Afar" | 2013 | Charlie Ford |
| "Riptide" | 2013 | Dimitri Basil & Laura Gorun |
| "Play With Fire" | 2013 | Charlie Ford |
| "Mess Is Mine" | 2014 | Luci Schroder |
| "First Time" | 2014 | Sing J. Lee |
| "Georgia" | 2015 | Luci Schroder |
| "All I Ever Wanted" | 2015 | Max Fairclough |
| "Fire and the Flood" | 2015 | Hayley Young |
| "Straight into Your Arms" | 2016 | Tobias Ashenheim |
| "Lay It on Me" | 2017 | Mimi Cave |
| "We're Going Home" | 2018 | Mimi Cave |
| "Saturday Sun" | 2018 | The Young Astronauts |
| "Call If You Need Me" | 2018 | Mimi Cave |
| "I'm with You" | 2018 | Mimi Cave |
| "You" (with Benny Blanco & Marshmello) | 2021 | William Child |
| "Missing Piece" | 2021 | Annelise Hickey |
| "Don't Fade" | 2022 | Agueda Sfer & Macari De Golferichs Moliné |
| "Clarity" | 2022 | Agueda Sfer |
| "Catalonia" | 2022 | Macari de Golferichs |
| "Looking At Me Like That" | 2022 | Brad Cauchy |
Guest appearances
| "Boys" (Charli XCX) | 2017 | Charli XCX & Sarah McColgan |
