= Lay It On Me Tour =

2017 concert tour by Vance Joy

- Tour by Vance Joy
- Location: North America; Europe; Oceania
- Associated album: Dream Your Life Away; Nation of Two
- Start date: 27 September 2017
- End date: 15 December 2017
- Legs: 4
- No. of shows: 29
- Supporting acts: Amy Shark; Chappell Roan; Plested; Gretta Ray; Karl Kling; Portugal. The Man

Vance Joy concert chronology
- The Fire and the Flood Tour (2016); Lay It On Me Tour (2017); We're Going Home Tour (2018)

The Lay It On Me Tour was the third major concert tour by Australian singer and songwriter Vance Joy, in support of his first studio album, Dream Your Life Away (2014) and second studio album, Nation of Two (2018). The tour began on 27 September 2017, in Vancouver, Canada and concluded on 15 December 2017 in Indianapolis, Indiana, United States.

== Background ==
Before the tour beginning, Joy performed at several major music festivals, including Sonic Boom Festival in Edmonton, X-Fest in Calgary, CityFolk Festival in Ottawa, Lollapalooza in São Paulo, Buenos Aires, Santiago and Chicago, Splendour in the Grass in Australia, Panorama Music Festival in New York, WayHome Music & Arts Festival in Canada, Mo Pop Festival in Detroit, Festivent Ville de Lévis in Quebec, Osheaga Festival in Montreal, Outside Lands Music and Arts Festival in San Francisco, Alt 98.7 Summer Camp in Long Beach and Festival Pier at Penn's Landing in Philadelphia.

Joy first announced the Australia dates in July 2017. The tour was scheduled to begin on 22 November 2017 in Melbourne, having as opening act the Australian singer Gretta Ray. That same month, Vance announced that he added two dates in London, England. The following month Joy confirmed the dates for the United States and Canada, the tour began on 27 September in Vancouver and would have the Australian singer Amy Shark and American singer Chappell Roan as opening acts during that leg.

== Critical response ==
Lay It On Me Tour received mixed reviews by critics, but they appreciated Joy's connection to his fans and the stories behind each song. Lauren Donelly writing for Vancouver Weekly described that: "Although his vocals were subdued and a touch strained in his higher range, he delivered with power and a winning smile" and "with Joy, in terms of personality and his music, what you see is what you get". Leah Adams from All Access Music commented that: "Vance Joy was in a word, ‘effortless.’ From the very first note to the last, he appeared completely at ease on stage. It was as if he was just playing for a few friends at a party in their living room", however, she rescued that "it was especially endearing to hear all the background stories on the songs and how Vance Joy came up with the ideas to write them".

In a review for Montreal Rocks, Chloe Bol appreciated the show cataloging it as a night with "energy". Shana Jagger of When The Horn Blows appreciated Joy's ability to combine indie folk and pop, which turned out to be "lyrical masterpiece which allowed the audience to visualize the story as it was being sung, making the crowd go crazy as they engage into the music and performance".

== Set list ==
This set list is from the show on 12 October 2017, in Minneapolis. It is not intended to represent all concerts for the tour.

1. "Fire and the Flood"
2. "From Afar"
3. "Wasted Time"
4. "Red Eye"
5. "Take Your Time"
6. "Call If You Need Me"
7. "Snaggletooth"
8. "Georgia"
9. "Like Gold"
10. "All Night Long" (Lionel Richie cover) / "Sorry" (Justin Bieber cover)
11. "Lay It on Me"

Encore

12. "Mess Is Mine"
13. "Riptide"

== Tour ==
List of concerts, showing date, city, country, venue and opening acts
Date	City	Country	Venue	Opening acts
Leg 1 – North America
28 September 2017	Vancouver	Canada	Vogue Theatre	Amy Shark; Chappell Roan
30 September 2017	Seattle	United States	The Showbox	Amy Shark; Chappell Roan
1 October 2017	Portland	United States	Crystal Ballroom	Amy Shark; Chappell Roan
3 October 2017	San Francisco	United States	Herbst Theatre	Amy Shark; Chappell Roan
5 October 2017	Los Angeles	United States	The Fonda Theatre	Amy Shark; Chappell Roan
7 October 2017^{[A]}	Austin	United States	Zilker Park	Amy Shark; Chappell Roan
10 October 2017	Denver	United States	Gothic Theatre	Amy Shark; Chappell Roan
12 October 2017	Minneapolis	United States	First Avenue	Amy Shark; Chappell Roan
15 October 2017^{[A]}	Austin	United States	Zilker Park	Amy Shark; Chappell Roan
17 October 2017	Nashville	United States	Cannery Ballroom	Amy Shark; Chappell Roan
19 October 2017	Washington	United States	Lincoln Theatre	Amy Shark; Chappell Roan
20 October 2017	Philadelphia	United States	Union Transfer	Amy Shark; Chappell Roan
22 October 2017	Boston	United States	Somerville Theatre	Amy Shark; Chappell Roan
23 October 2017	Brooklyn	United States	Brooklyn Steel	Amy Shark; Chappell Roan
16 October 2017	Toronto	Canada	Danforth Music Hall	Amy Shark; Chappell Roan
27 October 2017	Montreal	Canada	Corona Theatre	Amy Shark; Chappell Roan
Leg 2 – Europe
30 October 2017	London	England	Omeara	Plested
31 October 2017	London	England	Omeara	Plested
Leg 3 – Oceania
22 November 2017	Melbourne	Australia	Forum Theatre	Gretta Ray
24 November 2017	Sydney	Australia	Enmore Theatre	Gretta Ray
25 November 2017^{[B]}	Canberra	Australia	Commonwealth Park	N/A
Leg 4 – North America
3 December 2017^{[C]}	Tampa	United States	MidFlorida Credit Union Amphitheatre	N/A
5 December 2017	Portland	United States	Crystal Ballroom	Karl Kling
8 December 2017^{[D]}	Oakland	United States	Oakland Arena	N/A
9 December 2017^{[E]}	San Diego	United States	Valley View Casino Center	N/A
10 December 2017^{[F]}	Inglewood	United States	The Forum	N/A
13 December 2017	Aurora	United States	Peoria Civic Center	N/A
14 December 2017	St. Louis	United States	Peabody Opera House	Portugal. The Man
15 December 2017	Indianapolis	United States	Murat Theatre	Portugal. The Man

Festivals and other miscellaneous performances
^{[A]}This concert was part of the "Austin City Limits Music Festival"
^{[B]}This concert was part of the "Split Milk Festival"
^{[C]}This concert was part of the "97X Next Big Thing"
^{[D]}This concert was part of the "Live 105's Not So Silent Night"
^{[E]}This concert was part of the "Wrex the Halls"
^{[F]}This concert was part of the "KROQ Almost Acoustic Christmas"
