= List of awards and nominations received by Vance Joy =

Australian singer and songwriter

Vance Joy awards and nominations
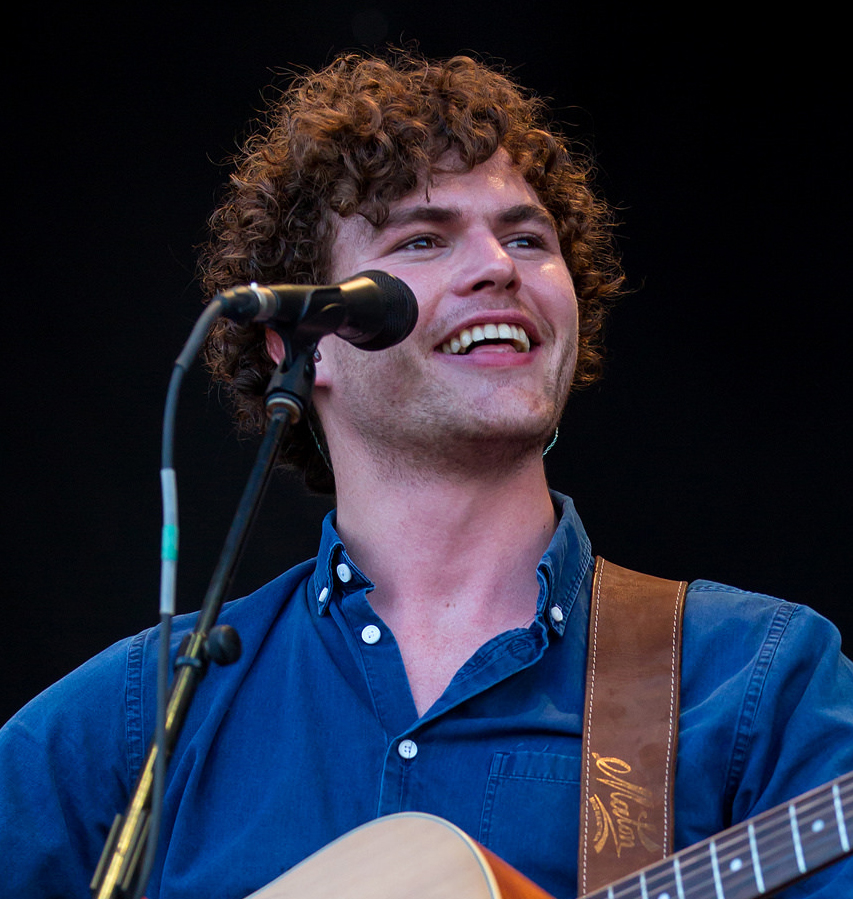
- Joy in 2015
Awards and nominations
Award	Wins	Nominations
AIR Awards	2	6
APRA Music Awards	4	14
ARIA Music Awards	3	29
ASCAP Pop Music Awards	1	1
CBC Music Awards	0	1
Channel [V] Awards	0	2
Helpmann Awards	0	1
International Songwriting Competition	1	1
J Award	0	1
Juno Awards	0	1
MTV Europe Music Award	0	3
MTV Video Music Award	0	1
Music Victoria Awards	1	3
National Live Music Awards	0	1
Newbie Awards	1	1
POPrepublic.tv IT List Awards	0	2
The AU Awards	0	1
VH1's Big Music You Oughta Know	0	1
World Music Awards	0	4
- Totals
Awards won	13
Nominations	73 (Note: Awards in certain categories come without a prior nomination.)

Vance Joy is an Australian singer and songwriter. He has received 13 awards from 73 nominations.

== AIR Awards ==
Year	Nominee / work	Award	Result	Ref.
2013	Himself	Breakthrough Independent Artist	Won	
2013	God Love You When You're Dancing	Best Independent Single/EP	Won	
2015	Himself	Best Independent Artist	Nominated	
2015	Dream Your Life Away	Best Independent Album	Nominated	
2015	"Fire and the Flood"	Best Independent Single/EP	Nominated	
2022	"Missing Piece"	Independent Song of the Year	Nominated	
2023	In Our Own Sweet Time	Best Independent Pop Album or EP	Nominated	

== APRA Music Awards ==
Year	Nominee / work	Award	Result	Ref.
2014	Himself	Breakthrough Songwriter of the Year	Nominated	
2014	"Riptide"	Most Played Australian Work	Nominated	
2014	"Riptide"	Pop Work of the Year	Won	
2014	"Riptide"	Song of the Year	Won	
2016	"Georgia"	Most Played Australian Work	Nominated	
2016	"Georgia"	Pop Work of the Year	Nominated	
2017	"Riptide"	Most Played Australian Work Overseas	Won	
2018	"Lay It On Me"	Pop Work of the Year	Nominated	
2018	"Lay It On Me"	Song of the Year	Shortlisted	
2019	"We're Going Home"	Most Played Work of the Year	Nominated	
2019	"We're Going Home"	Pop Work of the Year	Nominated	
2022	"Missing Piece"	Most Performed Australian Work	Nominated	
2022	"Missing Piece"	Most Performed Alternative Work	Won	
2022	"You" (with Benny Blanco and Marshmello)	Most Performed Pop Work	Nominated	
2023	"Clarity" (with Joel Little)	Song of the Year	Shortlisted	
2023	"Clarity" (with Joel Little)	Most Performed Australian Work of the Year	Nominated	
2023	"Clarity" (with Joel Little)	Most Performed Pop Work of the Year	Nominated	

== ARIA Music Awards ==
Year	Nominee / work	Award	Result	Ref.
2013	God Loves You When You're Dancing	Breakthrough Artist – Release	Nominated	
2013	God Loves You When You're Dancing	Best Pop Release	Nominated	
2013	"Riptide"	Song of the Year	Nominated	
2013	"Riptide"	Best Video	Nominated	
2013	Mélodie Française	Best World Music Album (Note: As featured artist.)	Nominated	
2014	"Mess Is Mine"	Best Male Artist	Nominated	
2014	"Mess Is Mine"	Best Independent Release	Nominated	
2015	Dream Your Life Away	Album of the Year	Nominated	
2015	Dream Your Life Away	Best Male Artist	Won	
2015	Dream Your Life Away	Best Independent Release	Nominated	
2015	Dream Your Life Away	Best Pop Release	Nominated	
2015	"Georgia"	Song of the Year	Nominated	
2015	"Georgia"	Best Video	Nominated	
2015	Dream Your Life Away Tour	Best Australian Live Act	Nominated	
2017	"Lay It on Me"	Best Male Artist	Nominated	
2017	"Lay It on Me"	Best Independent Release	Nominated	
2018	Nation of Two	Best Male Artist	Nominated	
2018	Nation of Two	Best Adult Contemporary Album	Won	
2018	"Lay It on Me"	Song of the Year	Nominated	
2021	"Missing Piece"	Best Artist	Nominated	
2021	"Missing Piece"	Best Independent Release	Nominated	
2021	"Missing Piece"	Best Pop Release	Nominated	
2021	"Missing Piece"	Song of the Year	Nominated	
2021	"Missing Piece"	Best Video	Won	
2022	In Our Own Sweet Time	Best Solo Artist	Nominated	
2022	In Our Own Sweet Time	Best Adult Contemporary Album	Nominated	
2022	"Clarity"	Best Pop Release	Nominated	
2022	"Clarity"	Song of the Year	Nominated	
2022	"Every Side of You" (Vance Joy and William Bleakley)	Best Video	Won	
2026	"Divine Feelings"	Song of the Year	Nominated	

== ASCAP Pop Music Awards ==
Year	Nominee / work	Award	Result	Ref.
2016	"Riptide"	Most Performed Songs	Won	

== CBC Music Awards ==
Year	Nominee / work	Award	Result	Ref.
2014	Himself	Best International Artist	Nominated	

== Channel [V] Awards ==
Year	Nominee / work	Award	Result	Ref.
2013	Himself	[V] Oz Artist of the Year	Nominated	
2014	Himself	[V] Oz Artist of the Year	Nominated	

== Helpmann Awards ==
Year	Nominee / work	Award	Result	Ref.
2016	The Fire and the Flood Tour	Best Australian Contemporary Concert	Nominated	

== International Songwriting Competition ==
Year	Nominee / work	Award	Result	Ref.
2014	"Riptide"	Grand Prize	Won	

== J Award ==
The J Awards are an annual series of Australian music awards that were established by the Australian Broadcasting Corporation's youth-focused radio station Triple J. They commenced in 2005.

Year	Nominee / work	Award	Result	Ref.
2013	"Riptide"	Australian Video of the Year	Nominated	

== Juno Awards ==
Year	Nominee / work	Award	Result	Ref.
2016	Dream Your Life Away	International Album of the Year	Nominated	

== MTV Awards ==
=== MTV Europe Music Award ===
Year	Nominee / work	Award	Result	Ref.
2015	Himself	Best Australian Act	Nominated	
2016	Himself	Best Australian Act	Nominated	
2022	Himself	Best Australian Act	Nominated	

=== MTV Video Music Awards ===
Year	Nominee / work	Award	Result	Ref.
2015	Himself	Artist to Watch	Nominated	

== Music Victoria Awards ==
Year	Nominee / work	Award	Result	Ref.
2013	"Riptide"	Best Song	Won	
2014	Himself	Best Male Artist	Nominated	
2018	Himself	Best Solo Artist	Nominated	

== National Live Music Awards ==
Year	Nominee / work	Award	Result	Ref.
2016	Himself	Best International Live Achievement – Solo	Nominated	

== Newbie Awards ==
Year	Nominee / work	Award	Result	Ref.
2014	Himself	Best New Male Artist	Won	

== POPrepublic.tv IT List Awards ==
Year	Nominee / work	Award	Result	Ref.
2014	Himself	Australian Male Artist	Nominated	
2014	Himself	Breakthrough Artist	Nominated	

== Rolling Stone Australia Awards ==
The Rolling Stone Australia Awards are awarded annually in January or February by the Australian edition of Rolling Stone magazine for outstanding contributions to popular culture in the previous year.

Year	Nominee / work	Award	Result	Ref.
2023	In Our Own Sweet Time	Best Record	Nominated	
2023	"Clarity"	Best Single	Nominated	
2023	Vance Joy	Rolling Stone Global Award	Nominated	

== The AU Awards ==
Year	Nominee / work	Award	Result	Ref.
2015	Himself	Best International Live Achievement – Solo Artist	Nominated	

== VH1's Big Music: You Oughta Know ==
Year	Nominee / work	Award	Result	Ref.
2014	Himself	Artist of the Year	Nominated	

== World Music Awards ==
Year	Nominee / work	Award	Result	Ref.
2014	"Riptide"	World's Best Video	Nominated	
2014	"Riptide"	World's Best Song	Nominated	
2014	Himself	World's Best Male Artist	Nominated	
2014	Himself	World's Best Live Act	Nominated	
