= Nation of Two World Tour =

2018 concert tour by Vance Joy

- Tour by Vance Joy
- Location: Europe; North America; Oceania; South America
- Associated album: Nation of Two
- Start date: March 6, 2018
- End date: November 30, 2018
- Legs: 5
- No. of shows: 96
- Supporting acts: Lily Moore; Lovelytheband; Alice Merton; Mondo Cozmo; Scott Helman; Cub Sport; Jack River; Didirri

Vance Joy concert chronology
- We're Going Home Tour (2018); Nation of Two World Tour (2018); Long Way Home Tour (2022)

The Nation of Two World Tour was the fifth major concert tour by Australian singer and songwriter Vance Joy, in support of his second studio album, Nation of Two (2018). The tour began on March 6, 2018, in Leeds, England and concluded on November 30, 2018 in Berry, France.

== Background ==
After finishing his Lay It On Me Tour in North America, Joy announced in November 2017 through social medias the dates of his next tour in Europe, which would begin on March 8, 2018 in Leeds, England to promote his second studio album and English singer Lily Moore was announced as the opening act.

On February 23, 2018, Joy released his second studio album Nation of Two. That same month, Joy announced that he would be touring North America, Oceania, South America and added more dates for Europe. In addition, it was announced that American band Lovelytheband, German singer Alice Merton, American singer Mondo Cozmo, Canadian singer Scott Helman, Australian band Cub Sport, Australian singer Jack River and Australian singer Didirri would be the opening act for different legs of the tour.

== Critical response ==
Nation of Two World Tour was acclaimed by critics, praising the acting, the voice, and its connection to fans. Dana Jacobs from Music, Why Not! highlighted Joy's performance on stage by saying that: "Keogh and his band delivered a standout performance" and "Joy’s performance was sincerely joyful". In a review for Rezonatr Magazine, Elise Hines appreciated the show, saying: "Joy’s witty, writes catchy songs, and his live show proves that he has real chops and isn’t a studio concoction with no shadow of a doubt". Kathryn Baker, writing for The Hoya, acknowledged "With his humble presence, Joy proved that a simplistic stage and acoustic performance can still create an exciting and memorable concert experience".

Music Connection critic Elena Ender appreciated the atmosphere of the concert, writing: "The indie folk tunes set up a wholesome and uplifting show, anchored by the Australian singer-songwriter. Transitioning between acoustic guitars and the ukulele, Vance Joy had a benevolent stage presence". Kathleen Leslie of Her Campus acknowledged that: "The show was absolutely fantastic. Vance Joy’s vocals live sound exactly like his album and he for sure knows how to get an audience up and singing".

== Commercial performance ==
The tour topped 6th at the Billboard Hot Tours chart with Joy's shows between June 11 and 15 in New York, Washington and Boston grosseding $868,074.

== Set list ==
This set list is from the show on April 21, 2018, in Phoenix. It is not intended to represent all concerts for the tour.

1. "Call If You Need Me"
2. "Mess Is Mine"
3. "Like Gold"
4. "Take Your Time"
5. "Alone With Me"
6. "Fire and the Flood"
7. "I'm With You"
8. "Little Boy"
9. "Bonnie & Clyde"
10. "Wasted Time"
11. "Georgia"
12. "One of These Days"
13. "All Night Long" (Lionel Richie cover) / "Sorry" (Justin Bieber cover)
14. "We're Going Home"
15. "Riptide"
16. "Lay It on Me"
17. "Saturday Sun"

== Shows ==
List of concerts, showing date, city, country, venue and opening acts
Date	City	Country	Venue	Opening acts
Leg 1 – Europe
March 6, 2018	Leeds	England	Stylus	N/A
March 7, 2018	London	England	Brixton Academy	Lily Moore
March 9, 2018	Paris	France	Le Trabendo	N/A
March 10, 2018	Brussels	Belgium	L'orangerie	N/A
March 11, 2018	Amsterdam	Netherlands	Melkweg	Lily Moore
March 13, 2018	Cologne	Germany	Live Music Hall	Lily Moore
March 14, 2018	Munich	Germany	Muffathalle	Lily Moore
March 16, 2018	Hamburg	Germany	Docks	Lily Moore
March 17, 2018	Berlin	Germany	Huxley's	Lily Moore
March 20, 2018	Dublin	Ireland	Olympia Theatre	N/A
March 22, 2018	Glasgow	Scotland	O2 ABC Glasgow	N/A
March 24, 2018	Bristol	England	O2 Academy Bristol	Lily Moore
March 25, 2018	Manchester	England	O2 Ritz	N/A
Leg 2 – North America
April 13, 2018	Berkeley	United States	Hearst Greek Theatre	Lovelytheband
April 15, 2018^{[A]}	Indio	United States	Empire Polo Club	N/A
April 18, 2018	Reno	United States	Grand Sierra Resort	Lovelytheband
April 20, 2018	Las Vegas	United States	Pearl Theatre	Lovelytheband
April 21, 2018	Phoenix	United States	Comerica Theatre	Lovelytheband
April 22, 2018^{[A]}	Indio	United States	Empire Polo Club	N/A
April 24, 2018	El Paso	United States	Plaza Theatre	Lovelytheband
April 27, 2018	Kansas City	United States	Midland Theatre	Lovelytheband
April 28, 2018	Tulsa	United States	Brady Theater	Lovelytheband
April 29, 2018	Oklahoma City	United States	The Criterion	Lovelytheband
May 2, 2018	Houston	United States	Revention Music Center	Lovelytheband
May 3, 2018	Dallas	United States	The Theatre at Grand Prairie	Lovelytheband
May 5, 2018^{[B]}	Memphis	United States	Tom Lee Park	N/A
May 6, 2018^{[C]}	Atlanta	United States	Central Park	N/A
May 8, 2018	St. Augustine	United States	St. Augustine Amphitheatre	Lovelytheband
May 10, 2018	Nashville	United States	Ascend Amphitheater	Lovelytheband
May 11, 2018	Charlotte	United States	Charlotte Metro Credit Union Amphitheatre	Lovelytheband
May 12, 2018	Cary	United States	Koka Booth Amphitheatre	Lovelytheband
May 15, 2018	Charlottesville	United States	Sprint Pavilion	Alice Merton
May 16, 2018	Columbus	United States	Express Live!	Alice Merton
May 18, 2018	Pittsburgh	United States	Stage AE	Alice Merton
May 19, 2018	Portsmouth	United States	Union Bank & Trust Pavilion	Alice Merton
May 22, 2018	Detroit	United States	Fox Theatre	Alice Merton
May 24, 2018	Grand Rapids	United States	20 Monroe Live	Alice Merton
May 25, 2018	Rosemont	United States	Rosemont Theatre	Alice Merton
May 26, 2018	St. Louis	United States	Fox Theatre	Alice Merton
May 30, 2018	Denver	United States	Red Rocks Amphitheatre	Alice Merton
June 1, 2018	Saint Paul	United States	Myth Live	Alice Merton
June 2, 2018	Milwaukee	United States	The Rave/Eagles Club	Alice Merton
June 5, 2018	Cleveland	United States	Jacobs Pavilion	Mondo Cozmo
June 6, 2018	Rochester	United States	The Dome Arena	Mondo Cozmo
June 8, 2018	Uncasville	United States	Mohegan Sun Arena	Mondo Cozmo
June 9, 2018	Gilford	United States	Bank of New Hampshire Pavilion	Mondo Cozmo
June 11, 2018	Albany	United States	Palace Theatre	Mondo Cozmo
June 12, 2018	Washington, D.C.	United States	The Anthem	Mondo Cozmo
June 14, 2018^{[D]}	Brooklyn	United States	Prospect Park Bandshell	N/A
June 15, 2018	Boston	United States	Leader Bank Pavilion	N/A
June 16, 2018^{[E]}	Dover	United States	Dover International Speedway	N/A
June 21, 2018	Montreal	Canada	Bell Centre	Mondo Cozmo; Scott Helman
June 22, 2018	Toronto	Canada	Budweiser Stage	Mondo Cozmo; Scott Helman
June 25, 2018	Winnipeg	Canada	MTS Place	Mondo Cozmo; Scott Helman
June 27, 2018	Edmonton	Canada	Rogers Place	Mondo Cozmo; Scott Helman
June 28, 2018	Calgary	Canada	Scotiabank Saddledome	Mondo Cozmo; Scott Helman
June 30, 2018^{[F]}	Burnaby	Canada	Deer Lake	Mondo Cozmo; Scott Helman
July 1, 2018	Seattle	United States	King Country's Marymoor Park	Mondo Cozmo
July 3, 2018	Portland	United States	McMenamins Amphitheatre	Mondo Cozmo
July 13, 2018^{[G]}	Louisville	United States	Waterfront Park	N/A
July 14, 2018^{[H]}	Birmingham	United States	Sloss Furnaces	N/A
Leg 3 – Oceania
September 8, 2018	Melbourne	Australia	Rod Laver Arena	Cub Sport; Jack River; Didirri
September 13, 2018	Sydney	Australia	Hordern Pavilion	Cub Sport; Jack River; Didirri
September 14, 2018	Sydney	Australia	Hordern Pavilion	Cub Sport; Jack River; Didirri
September 15, 2018	Melbourne	Australia	Rod Laver Arena	Cub Sport; Jack River; Didirri
September 17, 2018	Adelaide	Australia	Thebarton Theatre	Cub Sport; Jack River; Didirri
September 18, 2018	Adelaide	Australia	Thebarton Theatre	Cub Sport; Jack River; Didirri
September 20, 2018	Brisbane	Australia	Riverstage	Cub Sport; Jack River; Didirri
September 21, 2018	Brisbane	Australia	Riverstage	Cub Sport; Jack River; Didirri
September 23, 2018	Perth	Australia	Fremantle Arts Centre	Cub Sport; Jack River; Didirri
September 24, 2018	Perth	Australia	Fremantle Arts Centre	Cub Sport; Jack River; Didirri
September 29, 2018	Auckland	New Zealand	Town Hall	N/A
Leg 4 – South America
October 3, 2018	Lima	Peru	C.C. Barranco	N/A
October 5, 2018	São Paulo	Brazil	Audio Club	N/A
October 6, 2018	Rio de Janeiro	Brazil	Circo Voador	N/A
October 10, 2018	Buenos Aires	Argentina	Vorterix Theatre	N/A
October 13, 2018	Santiago	Chile	La Cupula Theatre	N/A
October 16, 2018	Bogotá	Colombia	Royal Center Theatre	N/A
October 18, 2018	Mexico City	Mexico	La Plaza Condesa	N/A
October 20, 2018^{[I]}	Monterrey	Mexico	Fundidora Park	N/A
Leg 5 – Europe
October 25, 2018	Madrid	Spain	Joy Eslava	Scott Helman
October 26, 2018	Barcelona	Spain	Sala Bikini	Scott Helman
October 29, 2018	Paris	France	Élysée Montmartre	Scott Helman
October 30, 2018	Brussels	Belgium	La Madeleine	Scott Helman
November 2, 2018	Amsterdam	Netherlands	Paradiso	Scott Helman
November 3, 2018	Amsterdam	Netherlands	Paradiso	Scott Helman
November 5, 2018	Leipzig	Germany	Täubchenthal	Scott Helman
November 6, 2018	Stuttgart	Germany	Im Wizemann	N/A
November 7, 2018	Bochum	Germany	Zeche Bochum	Scott Helman
November 9, 2018	Zürich	Switzerland	Komplex 457	Scott Helman
November 10, 2018	Vienna	Austria	WUK	Scott Helman
November 11, 2018	Vienna	Austria	WUK	Scott Helman
November 13, 2018	London	England	Alexandra Palace	N/A
November 15, 2018	Dublin	Ireland	Olympia Theatre	N/A
November 16, 2018	Dublin	Ireland	Olympia Theatre	N/A
November 30, 2018^{[J]}	Berry	France	Berry Showground	N/A

Festivals and other miscellaneous performances
^{[A]}This concert was part of the "Coachella Valley Music and Arts Festival"
^{[B]}This concert was part of the "Beale Street Festival"
^{[C]}This concert was part of the "Shaky Knees Music Festival"
^{[D]}This concert was part of the "Celebrate Brooklyn!"
^{[E]}This concert was part of the "Firefly Music Festival"
^{[F]}This concert was part of the "Festival Lawn"
^{[G]}This concert was part of the "Forecastle Festival"
^{[H]}This concert was part of the "Sloss Music & Arts Festival"
^{[I]}This concert was part of the "Tecate Live Out"
^{[J]}This concert was part of the "Fairgrounds Festival"
