= Live at Red Rocks Amphitheatre =

Live album by Vance Joy
- Released: 16 November 2018
- Recorded: 30 May 2018
- Venue: Red Rocks Amphitheatre, Colorado
- Length: 70:26
- Label: Liberation Music

Vance Joy chronology
Nation of Two (2018)	Live at Red Rocks Amphitheatre (2018)	In Our Own Sweet Time (2022)

Live at Red Rocks Amphitheatre is the second live album by Australian singer-songwriter Vance Joy. The album was released on 16 November 2018 on the last date of the World Tour. The first live album was from the Fire and the Flood Tour, available only for download via his mailing list, and social media subscribers.

== Critical reception ==
Professional ratings
Review scores
Source	Rating
The AU Review	3.5/5 stars

Genevieve Morris from The AU Review said "The whole album creates a sweet reminiscent atmosphere", adding "the set is well constructed and Vance Joy's amiable and delightful nature takes you through a lyrical look at love, lust and the messiness of relationships.".

== Track listing ==
Side A
No.	Title	Writer(s)	Length
1.	"Call If You Need Me"	James Keogh	2:46
2.	"Mess Is Mine"	Keogh	4:12
3.	"Like Gold"	Keogh, Dan Wilson	4:23
4.	"Take Your Time"	Keogh, Dave Bassett	4:00
5.	"Alone With Me"	Keogh	5:31
6.	"Fire and the Flood"	Keogh, Benny Blanco	4:52
7.	"I'm with You"	Keogh	4:30
8.	"Little Boy"	Keogh	6:24

Side B
No.	Title	Writer(s)	Length
1.	"Bonnie & Clyde"	Keogh	3:23
2.	"Wasted Time"	Keogh	5:28
3.	"Georgia"	Keogh	4:53
4.	"One of These Days"	Keogh, Justin Parker	3:17
5.	"We're Going Home"	Keogh, Wilson	4:55
6.	"Riptide"	Keogh	3:43
7.	"Lay It on Me"	Keogh, Bassett	3:59
8.	"Saturday Sun"	Keogh, Bassett	4:09

== Release history ==
Release history for Live at Red Rocks Amphitheatre
Region	Release date	Format	Label	Catalog
Australia	16 November 2018	Digital download; streaming	Liberation	
Australia	16 November 2018	Limited edition vinyl	Liberation	LRLP0007
