= The Fire and the Flood Tour =

2016 concert tour by Vance Joy

- Tour by Vance Joy
- Location: North America; Oceania
- Associated album: Dream Your Life Away
- Start date: January 13, 2016
- End date: April 30, 2016
- Legs: 2
- No. of shows: 57
- Supporting acts: Reuben and the Dark; Jamie Lawson; Elle King; Blind Pilot; Holy Holy

Vance Joy concert chronology
- Dream Your Life Away Tour (2014–15); The Fire and the Flood Tour (2016); Lay It On Me Tour (2017)

The Fire and the Flood Tour was the second major concert tour by Australian singer and songwriter Vance Joy, in support of his first debut studio album, Dream Your Life Away (2014). The tour began on January 13, 2016, in Vancouver, Canada and concluded on April 30, 2016, in Brisbane, Australia.

== Background ==
In September 2015, during The 1989 World Tour by Taylor Swift, Joy announced that he would once again embark on a main act tour for the first half of 2016, confirming the first dates for Canada and the United States, where he would begin playing in Vancouver on January 13 and end in Boston on April 1, counting a total of 40 concerts for that leg of the tour. In addition, he reported that he was promoting "Straight into Your Arms" and "Fire and the Flood", the two new songs from the special edition of his first album, Dream Your Life Away (2014). Canadian band Reuben and the Dark, English singer Jamie Lawson, American singer Elle King and American indie band Blind Pilot was announced to be an opening act.

Joy first announced the Australia dates on November 26, 2015. The tour was scheduled to begin on April 23, 2016, in Melbourne and end on April 30 in Brisbane, having as opening act the Australian band Holy Holy.

== Critical response ==
The Fire and the Flood Tour was praised by critics, highlighting above all the voice and interpretation of Joy of his songs. Sylvia Borgo from Owl and Bear was positive towards Joy's performance, saying: "Joy made the audience swoon with his sweet and delicate voice" and "was perfectly charming throughout the night". Kelly Fox of Front Row Report deemed "No part of the set list felt abrupt or forced, but rather fluid and natural". The website The Writer's Bloc appreciated Joy's ability to connect with her audiences, saying: "His incredible charisma and ability to speak to his audience are far from mundane. Each and every one of his songs beautifully tells of the desire, the longing, simply the sublime qualities of love we experience, yet cannot find the words to describe".

Reviewing the tour's Brisbane show, Drew Creighton from The North West Star highlighted that "His music had an energy to it and while his voice suffered at the extremes of his range, it made for a lively and almost fiery performance". Creighton also added that "Joy knows how to connect with his audience and his show is designed to help with that connection, with the lights almost entirely focused on him for the whole gig".

== Set list ==
This set list is from the show on February 19, 2016, in Denver. It is not intended to represent all concerts for the tour.

1. "Mess Is Mine"
2. "Red Eye"
3. "Winds of Change"
4. "All I Ever Wanted"
5. "Straight into Your Arms"
6. "From Afar"
7. "Wasted Time"
8. "Play With Fire"
9. "Emmylou"
10. "Georgia"
11. "Best That I Can"
12. "Riptide"
13. "You Can Call Me Al" (Paul Simon cover) / "Cheerleader" (Omi cover)

Encore

14. "My Kind Of Man"
15. "Fire and the Flood"

== Shows ==
List of concerts, showing date, city, country, venue and opening acts
Date	City	Country	Venue	Opening acts
Leg 1 – North America
January 13, 2016	Vancouver	Canada	Orpheum Theatre	Reuben and the Dark
January 14, 2016	Kelowna	Canada	Kelowna Community Theatre	Reuben and the Dark
January 16, 2016	Edmonton	Canada	Northern Alberta Jubilee Auditorium	Reuben and the Dark
January 17, 2016	Calgary	Canada	Southern Alberta Jubilee Auditorium	Reuben and the Dark
January 19, 2016	Winnipeg	Canada	Burton Cummings Theatre	Reuben and the Dark
January 20, 2016	Minneapolis	United States	Northrop Auditorium	Reuben and the Dark
January 22, 2016	Chicago	United States	Riviera Theatre	Reuben and the Dark
January 25, 2016	Windsor	Canada	The Colosseum at Caesars Windsor	—
January 26, 2016	Toronto	Canada	Massey Hall	Reuben and the Dark
January 27, 2016	Toronto	Canada	Massey Hall	Reuben and the Dark
January 29, 2016	Montreal	Canada	Métropolis	Reuben and the Dark
January 30, 2016	Montreal	Canada	Métropolis	Reuben and the Dark
January 31, 2016	Montreal	Canada	Métropolis	Reuben and the Dark
February 2, 2016	Sherbrooke	Canada	Théâtre Granada	Reuben and the Dark
February 3, 2016	Quebec City	Canada	Grand Théâtre de Québec	Reuben and the Dark
February 4, 2016	Rimouski	Canada	Salle Desjardins Telus	Reuben and the Dark
February 6, 2016	Moncton	Canada	The Centre at Casino New Brunswick	Reuben and the Dark
February 7, 2016	Halifax	Canada	Rebecca Cohn Auditorium	Reuben and the Dark
February 8, 2016	Halifax	Canada	Rebecca Cohn Auditorium	Reuben and the Dark
February 10, 2016	Portland	United States	State Theatre	Reuben and the Dark
February 11, 2016	Wallingford	United States	The Dome at Toyota Presents Oakdale Theatre	Reuben and the Dark
February 15, 2016	Cleveland	United States	House of Blues Cleveland	—
February 16, 2016	Indianapolis	United States	Mandalay Bay Events Center	Jamie Lawson
February 17, 2016	Kansas City	United States	Arvest Bank Theatre At The Midland	Jamie Lawson; Elle King
February 19, 2016	Denver	United States	1stBank Center	Jamie Lawson; Elle King
February 20, 2016	Salt Lake City	United States	Saltair	Jamie Lawson; Elle King
February 23, 2016	Portland	United States	Arlene Schnitzer Concert Hall	Jamie Lawson; Elle King
February 24, 2016	Seattle	United States	Paramount Ballroom	Jamie Lawson; Elle King
February 26, 2016	Oakland	United States	Fox Theatre	Jamie Lawson; Elle King
February 27, 2016	Oakland	United States	Fox Theatre	Jamie Lawson; Elle King
February 29, 2016	San Diego	United States	Balboa Theatre	Jamie Lawson; Elle King
March 1, 2016	Phoenix	United States	The Marquee	Jamie Lawson; Elle King
March 3, 2016	Los Angeles	United States	The Shrine Expo Hall	Jamie Lawson; Elle King
March 4, 2016	Pomona	United States	Foz Theater	Jamie Lawson; Elle King
March 5, 2016	Las Vegas	United States	Brooklyn Bowl	Jamie Lawson; Elle King
March 8, 2016	Austin	United States	Stubb's	Jamie Lawson; Elle King
March 9, 2016	Austin	United States	Stubb's	Jamie Lawson; Elle King
March 11, 2016	Dallas	United States	Verizon Theatre at Grand Prairie	Jamie Lawson; Elle King
March 12, 2016	Houston	United States	Revention Music Center	Jamie Lawson; Elle King
March 14, 2016	St. Petersburg	United States	Jannus Live	Jamie Lawson; Blind Pilot
March 15, 2016	Orlando	United States	House of Blues Orlando	Jamie Lawson; Blind Pilot
March 16, 2016	Miami	United States	The Fillmore Miami Beach at the Jackie Gleason Theater	Jamie Lawson; Blind Pilot
March 18, 2016	Nashville	United States	The Ryman Auditorium	Jamie Lawson; Blind Pilot
March 19, 2016	Atlanta	United States	Tabernacle	Jamie Lawson; Blind Pilot
March 21, 2016	Columbus	United States	Express Live!	Jamie Lawson; Blind Pilot
March 22, 2016	Detroit	United States	The Fillmore Detroit	Jamie Lawson; Blind Pilot
March 23, 2016	Pittsburgh	United States	Stage AE	Jamie Lawson; Blind Pilot
March 25, 2016	Washington	United States	9:30 Club	Jamie Lawson; Blind Pilot
March 26, 2016	Washington	United States	9:30 Club	Jamie Lawson; Blind Pilot
March 28, 2016	Philadelphia	United States	Electric Factory	Jamie Lawson; Blind Pilot
March 29, 2016	New York	United States	Beacon Theatre	Jamie Lawson; Blind Pilot
March 30, 2016	New York	United States	Beacon Theatre	Jamie Lawson; Blind Pilot
April 1, 2016	Boston	United States	House of Blues Boston	Jamie Lawson; Blind Pilot
Leg 2 – Oceania
April 23, 2016	Melbourne	Australia	Margaret Court Arena	Holy Holy
April 24, 2016	Sydney	Australia	Opera House Concert Hall	Holy Holy
April 25, 2016	Sydney	Australia	Opera House Concert Hall	Holy Holy
April 30, 2016	Brisbane	Australia	Riverstage	Holy Holy
