= Dream Your Life Away Tour =

2014–15 concert tour by Vance Joy

- Tour by Vance Joy
- Location: North America; Europe; Oceania
- Associated album: Dream Your Life Away
- Start date: September 9, 2014
- End date: March 28, 2015
- Legs: 4
- No. of shows: 57
- Supporting acts: Ezra Vine; Jaymes Young; #1 Dads; Airling

Vance Joy concert chronology
- Riptide Tour (2013); Dream Your Life Away Tour (2014–15); The Fire and the Flood Tour (2016)

The Dream Your Life Away Tour was the first major concert tour by Australian singer and songwriter Vance Joy, in support of his debut studio album, Dream Your Life Away (2014). The tour began on September 9, 2014, in New York, United States and concluded on March 28, 2015, in Newcastle, Australia.

== Background ==
In November 2013, it was announced that Vance Joy would embark on the tour of the American band Young The Giant as an opening act during the months of April and March 2014, thus marking her first experience giving a shows in North America. During that period, Vance had the opportunity to promote his songs from his EP God Loves You When You're Dancing released on March 22, 2013. Before the tour beginning, Joy performed at several major music festivals, including Meredith Music Festival in Victoria, St Jerome's Laneway Festival in Auckland, Brisbane, Melbourne, Sydney and Fremantle, SXSW Festival in Austin, Groovin' the Moo in Adelaide, Oakbank, Maitland, Canberra, Victoria, Townsville and Bunbury, Bassinthegrass in Darwin, Field Trip Festival in Toronto, Bonnaroo Music Festival in Tennessee, Firefly Music Festival in Dover, 96X Fest in Portsmouth, Glastonbury Festival in Pilton, Splendour in the Grass in Byron Bay, Sonic Lunch in Ann Arbor, Lollapalooza in Chicago, Osheaga Festival in Montreal, Edmonton Folk Music Festival in Edmonton, Outside Lands Music and Arts Festival in San Francisco, CD 102.5 Summerfest in Columbus, Pukkelpop in Hasselt and V Festival in Chelmsford.

On September 5, 2014, Joy released her first studio album Dream Your Life Away. The indie folk album was Joy's first album marketed as indie music. It was a commercial success in Australia, United States, Canada and England, selling over one million copies all over the world. Joy first announced the European dates in January 2014 and that New Zealand singer Ezra Vine would officiate as the opening act. On July 15, 2014, via his Facebook account announced the North American dates, where would the tour begin and it was reported that the American singer Jaymes Young would be the opening act during this stage. On September 2, 2014, Joy announced the dates of he's world tour for Australia. Australian band #1 Dads and Australian singer Airling was announced to be an opening act. The tour was scheduled to begin on March 5, 2015 and end on March 28 of that year.

== Critical response ==
The Dream Your Life Away Tour received positive reviews by critics, praise centered on his vocals and his performance on stage. In a review for Best New Bands, Liz Rowley appreciated Joy's ability to deliver the show, saying: "He is a high-caliber act, extraordinarily talented to boot, and his capacity to seduce an audience is seemingly second nature". Jade Jurewicz, writing for Perth Show, acknowledged "Joy proved he is every bit as talented as he is genuine". Irish Examiner critic Ed Power appreciated Joy's work on stage, writing: "He is enormously impassioned, blessed with a beautifully earthy quaver - and yet, there's an overspill of sincerity in his material that can feel cloying if you're not in the mood". Carry Clancy from There Goes The Fear highlighted that: "Joy created a seamless if predictable set list" and in addition to: "Joy and his bandmates played a tight, well-rehearsed set, but while the songs themselves were exquisitely performed".

== Set list ==
This set list is from the show on October 29, 2014, in Boston. It is not intended to represent all concerts for the tour.

1. "Emmylou"
2. "Red Eye"
3. "Play With Fire"
4. "Winds of Change"
5. "Georgia"
6. "Snaggletooth"
7. "My Kind Of Man"
8. "From Afar"
9. "Wasted Time"
10. "Best That I Can"
11. "Riptide"
12. "Mess Is Mine"

== Shows ==
List of concerts, showing date, city, country, venue and opening acts
Date	City	Country	Venue	Opening acts
Leg 1 – North America
September 9, 2014	New York	United States	The Spectrum	N/A
September 11, 2014	Boston	United States	Copley Square	The Naked Stills; AJ Edwards
September 13, 2014^{[A]}	Philadelphia	United States	Penn's Landing	N/A
Leg 2 – Europe
September 21, 2014	Belfast	Northern Ireland	Limelight	Ezra Vine
September 22, 2014	Dublin	Ireland	The Academy	Ezra Vine
September 24, 2014	Glasgow	Scotland	Òran Mór	Ezra Vine
September 25, 2014	Manchester	England	Manchester Academy 2	Ezra Vine
September 26, 2014	Leeds	England	Stylus	Ezra Vine
September 28, 2014	Birmingham	England	Library	Ezra Vine
September 29, 2014	Bristol	England	Anson Rooms	Ezra Vine
September 30, 2014	Brighton	England	Concorde 2	Ezra Vine
October 2, 2014	London	England	Shepherd's Bush Empire	Ezra Vine
October 3, 2014	London	England	Shepherd's Bush Empire	Ezra Vine
October 6, 2014	Brussels	Belgium	Cirque Royal	Ezra Vine
October 7, 2014	Paris	France	Café de la Danse	Ezra Vine
October 9, 2014	Amsterdam	Netherlands	Melkweg	Ezra Vine
October 10, 2014	Cologne	Germany	Gloria-Theater	Ezra Vine
October 12, 2014	Hamburg	Germany	Docks	Ezra Vine
October 13, 2014	Berlin	Germany	Postbahnhof	Ezra Vine
Leg 3 – North America
October 17, 2014	Dallas	United States	Trees Dallas	Jaymes Young
October 18, 2014	Austin	United States	Emo's	Jaymes Young
October 19, 2014	Houston	United States	Fitzgerald's	Jaymes Young
October 21, 2014	Nashville	United States	Cannery Ballroom	Jaymes Young
October 22, 2014	Atlanta	United States	Terminal West	Jaymes Young
October 23, 2014	Charleston	United States	The Pour House	Jaymes Young
October 25, 2014	Washington	United States	9:30 Club	Jaymes Young
October 28, 2014	New York	United States	Webster Hall	Jaymes Young
October 29, 2014	Boston	United States	Paradise Rock Club	Jaymes Young
October 30, 2014	Montreal	Canada	Corona Theatre	Jaymes Young
November 1, 2014	Toronto	Canada	Phoenix Concert Theatre	Jaymes Young
November 3, 2014	Ottawa	Canada	The Observatory	Jaymes Young
November 4, 2014	London	Canada	Rum Runners	Jaymes Young
November 6, 2014	Columbus	United States	A&R Music Bar	Jaymes Young
November 7, 2014	Detroit	United States	Saint Andrew's Hall	Jaymes Young
November 8, 2014	Chicago	United States	Lincoln Hall	Jaymes Young
November 10, 2014	Minneapolis	United States	Varsity Theatre	Jaymes Young
November 11, 2014	Winnipeg	Canada	West End Cultural Centre	Jaymes Young
November 14, 2014	Calgary	Canada	Republik	Jaymes Young
November 16, 2014	Vancouver	Canada	Commodore Ballroom	Jaymes Young
November 19, 2014	Eugene	United States	W.O.W. Hall	Jaymes Young
November 21, 2014	Salt Lake City	United States	Urban Lounge	Jaymes Young
November 22, 2014	Denver	United States	Bluebird Theater	Jaymes Young
November 24, 2014	Tempe	United States	Marquee Theatre	Jaymes Young
November 25, 2014	San Diego	United States	House of Blues	Jaymes Young
November 28, 2014	Los Angeles	United States	The Fonda Theatre	Jaymes Young
November 29, 2014	San Francisco	United States	Slim's	Jaymes Young
December 1, 2014	Tulsa	United States	Tulsa Theater	Jaymes Young
Leg 4 – Oceania
March 5, 2015	Gold Coast	Australia	Arts Centre	#1 Dads; Airling
March 6, 2015	Brisbane	Australia	The Tivoli	#1 Dads; Airling
March 7, 2015	Sunshine	Australia	Nambour Civic Centre	#1 Dads; Airling
March 13, 2015	Melbourne	Australia	Palais Theatre	#1 Dads; Airling
March 14, 2015	Ballarat	Australia	Regent Cinema Theatre	#1 Dads; Airling
March 20, 2015	Perth	Australia	Astor Theatre	#1 Dads; Airling
March 21, 2015	Adelaide	Australia	Thebarton Theatre	#1 Dads; Airling
March 24, 2015	Wollongong	Australia	Anita's Theatre	#1 Dads; Airling
March 27, 2015	Sydney	Australia	Enmore Theatre	#1 Dads; Airling
March 28, 2015	Newcastle	Australia	Civic Theatre	#1 Dads; Airling

Festivals and other miscellaneous performances
^{[A]}This concert was part of the "Festival Pier at Penn's Landing"

=== Cancelled shows ===
Date	City	Country	Venue	Reason
November 24, 2014	Phoenix	United States	Crescent Ballroom	Rescheduled for the same day at the Marquee Theatre in Tempe due to its increased seating capacity as it had increased Joy's popularity.
