= Saturday Sun =

Saturday Sun may refer to:

- Saturday Sun (Vance Joy song)
- Saturday Sun (Crowded House song)
- Saturday Sun (Nick Drake song)
