= Alone with Me =

Alone with Me may refer to:

== Music ==
- "Alone with Me", a song from the musical Hands on a Hardbody (2012)
- "Alone with Me", a song by Cher Lloyd from Sorry I'm Late (2014)
- "Alone with Me", a song by This Wild Life from Clouded (2014)
- "Alone with Me", a song by Vance Joy from Nation of Two (2018)

== Books ==
- Alone with Me: A New Autobiography by Eartha Kitt (1976)
