= From Afar =

From Afar may refer to:

- From Afar (album) by Ensiferum, 2009
- From Afar (song), by Vance Joy, 2013
- From Afar (film), a 2015 Venezuelan film
- "From Afar", a 1998 song by Van Halen from Van Halen III
