= First Time (Vance Joy song) =

Single by Vance Joy

from the album Dream Your Life Away
- Released: 4 August 2014
- Recorded: 2013
- Genre: Indie pop; Indie folk
- Length: 3:44
- Label: Liberation Music
- Songwriter(s): Vance Joy
- Producer(s): Ryan Hadlock

Vance Joy singles chronology
"Mess Is Mine" (2014)	"First Time" (2014)	"Georgia" (2015)

Music video
- "First Time" on YouTube

"First Time" is a song by Australian singer-songwriter Vance Joy. The song was released on 4 August 2014 as the second single from his debut studio album Dream Your Life Away (2014).

== Music video ==
A music video to accompany the release of "First Time" was first released onto YouTube on 4 August 2014 at a total length of three minutes and fifty-six seconds.

== Track listing ==
Digital download
No.	Title	Length
1.	"First Time"	3:44

== Charts ==
Chart (2014)	Peak position
Australia (ARIA)	95
Belgium (Ultratip Bubbling Under Flanders)	57
Switzerland Airplay (Schweizer Hitparade)	99

== Release history ==
Region	Date	Format	Label
Australia	4 August 2014	Digital download	Liberation Music
