= We're Going Home =

We're Going Home may refer to:

- "We're Going Home", a song by Montrose from Paper Money (1974)
- "We're Going Home", a song by Vance Joy from Nation of Two (2018)
