= Straight into Your Arms =

Single by Vance Joy

from the album Dream Your Life Away
- Released: February 2016
- Recorded: Los Angeles, 2015
- Genre: Indie pop; indie folk
- Length: 3:37
- Label: Liberation Music
- Songwriter(s): Vance Joy
- Producer(s): Ryan Hadlock

Vance Joy singles chronology
"Fire and the Flood" (2015)	"Straight into Your Arms" (2016)	"Lay It on Me" (2017)

Music video
- "Straight into Your Arms" on YouTube

"Straight into Your Arms" is a song by Australian singer-songwriter Vance Joy. The song was released in February 2016 as the second single on the deluxe edition of his debut studio album Dream Your Life Away. The song peaked at number 56 on the ARIA Chart.

== Music video ==
The video was released on 2 March 2016. The music video is directed by UK based director Toby Ashenheim, and the poignant video sees two puppets engaged in a stirring and emotional dance, mirrored by their human shadows. The video took months of meticulous, painstaking work to create – the dolls animated predominantly by hand using strings and basic rigging to simulate dancing, with 3D animation taking care of more complex movements. Toby Ashenheim said; “To me the song feels really fresh and uplifting, and I wanted to try a simple concept to echo that feeling. I had the idea listening to the track; an image of a worse for wear mannequin, casting a shadow far more dimensional than its stock “one size fits all” appearance. In a way the dolls could be anyone, what's important is that when they're together they become something truly special, representing a special bond between two people who have been very close friends or lovers... a dynamic that may only ever be understood by them”.

== Weekly charts ==
Chart (2016)	Peak position
Australia (ARIA)	56
