= I'm with You (Vance Joy song) =

Single by Vance Joy

from the album Nation of Two
- Released: 21 September 2018
- Label: Liberation Music
- Songwriter(s): James Keogh

Vance Joy singles chronology
"Call If You Need Me" (2018)	"I'm with You" (2018)	"You" (2021)

Music video
- "I'm with You" on YouTube

"I'm with You" is a song by Australian singer-songwriter Vance Joy. A 15-second sample of the song was released on Joy's Facebook page in February 2018, a week before the release of Joy's second studio album Nation of Two. A single edit and re-recorded version was released on 21 September 2018 as the sixth single from Joy's Nation of Two. Upon released, Joy said: "Last month, at the end of the North American, tour I went back into the studio to re-record a song from Nation of Two. It's one of my favourite songs off the album, and a lot of people I have met over the last few months on tour have shared how much they love this track as well. I wanted to create a version with a band feel that had a bit more fire."

== Music video ==
The video was directed by Mimi Cave and released on 22 October 2018. Broadway World reviewed the video, saying that "the stunning video is a perfect companion piece to the song. Shot in Hawaii, it follows two women through a magical landscape, with a dreamlike feel."

== Track listing ==
Digital download
No.	Title	Length
1.	"I'm with You"	3:41

== Charts ==
Chart (2018)	Peak position
Australia (ARIA)	97

== Certifications ==
Region	Certification	Certified units/sales
Australia (ARIA)	Platinum	70,000^{‡}
New Zealand (RMNZ)	Gold	15,000^{‡}
^{‡} Sales+streaming figures based on certification alone.
