= Cannery Ballroom =

Live Music venue in Nashville, Tennessee

Cannery Hall
- Interactive map of Cannery Hall
- Address: One Cannery Row
- Location: Nashville, Tennessee
- Coordinates: 36.1529535°N 86.7805384°W
- Capacity: Cannery Hall: Mainstage (1,275), The Mil (550), and Row One Stage (300).
- Type: Live Music Venue

Website
- canneryhall.com

Cannery Hall is the largest independent music venue in Nashville. Anchoring Cannery Row, just outside of downtown Nashville's lower Broadway and "The Gulch," Cannery Hall is located in the Station District. The historic building dates to 1883 and has been a music venue for over 40 years. Highlighting music across all genres, Cannery Hall's three stages include the Mainstage (1,275), The Mil (550), and Row One Stage (300). On the top floor of Cannery Hall sits Amaranth, an event center with beautiful views of downtown Nashville.

The listed hours of operation are Box Office Hours only. Doors open for most shows one hour before the scheduled event time.

Built in 1883, the Cannery was originally a flour mill and later a place to grind coffee. The building earned its name when the Dale Food company bought it in 1957 and began processing food such as jams, jellies, mustard, mayonnaise, and peanut butter. eventually opening a restaurant called "The Cannery" in the early 1970s. The building housed a country music theatre in the late 1970s and evolved into one of Nashville's primary music venues in the 1980s and early 1990s. Rival Sons, Jane's Addiction, Iggy Pop, Lenny Kravitz, Biffy Clyro, Gregg Allman, Arkells, Robin Trower among other touring acts of the time played the Cannery.
