= Call If You Need Me =

Single by Vance Joy

from the album Nation of Two
- Released: 11 February 2018
- Genre: Indie folk; folk rock
- Length: 2;43
- Label: Liberation Music
- Songwriter(s): James Keogh
- Producer(s): Ryan Hadlock

Vance Joy singles chronology
"Saturday Sun" (2018)	"Call If You Need Me" (2018)	"I'm with You" (2018)

Music video
- "Call If You Need Me" on YouTube

"Call If You Need Me" is a song by Australian singer-songwriter Vance Joy. The song was released on 11 February 2018 by Liberation Music as the fifth single from his second studio album, Nation of Two (2018). The song charted on the Billboard Hot Rock & Alternative Songs along with three other songs from the album and peaked at number 30.

== Music video ==
The video was directed by Mimi Cave and released on 12 February 2018.

== Track listing ==
Digital download
No.	Title	Length
1.	"Call If You Need Me"	3:41

== Charts ==
Chart (2018)	Peak position
Australia (ARIA)	145
US Hot Rock & Alternative Songs (Billboard)	30

== Certifications ==
Region	Certification	Certified units/sales
Australia (ARIA)	Gold	35,000^{‡}
^{‡} Sales+streaming figures based on certification alone.
