= Nation of Two =

Studio album by Vance Joy
- Released: 23 February 2018
- Genre: Indie folk; folk rock
- Length: 45:15
- Label: Liberation Music (Australia and New Zealand); Atlantic Records (United States); Warner Music (International)
- Producer: Dave Bassett; Phil Ek; Simone Felipe; Ryan Hadlock

Vance Joy chronology
Dream Your Life Away (2014)	Nation of Two (2018)	Live at Red Rocks Amphitheatre (2018)

Singles from Nation of Two
- 1. "Lay It on Me" Released: 12 July 2017; 2. "Like Gold" Released: 3 November 2017; 3. "We're Going Home" Released: 12 January 2018; 4. "Saturday Sun" Released: 1 February 2018; 5. "Call If You Need Me" Released: 11 February 2018; 6. "I'm with You" Released: 21 September 2018

Nation of Two is the second studio album by Australian singer-songwriter Vance Joy. The album was announced on 12 January 2018. The album serves as a follow-up to his 2014 album Dream Your Life Away (2014). with Vance Joy explaining: "Nation of Two describes a perfectly self-contained couple; their world beginning and ending at the bed they share, the car they ride in, or any other place where they're together... the idea that their love for each other gives them their bearings; a point of reference that makes sense of life." The concept originally appeared in the Kurt Vonnegut novel Mother Night.

At the ARIA Music Awards of 2018, Nation of Two won Best Adult Contemporary Album.

== Singles ==
"Lay It on Me" was released as the lead single from the album on 12 July 2017. The song peaked at number 18 on the Australian Singles Chart and has been certified platinum. "Like Gold" was released on 3 November 2017 as the album's second single. "We're Going Home" was released on 12 January 2018 as the album's third single. "Saturday Sun" was released as the fourth single on 1 February 2018. "Call If You Need Me" was released on 11 February 2018 and "I'm With You" was released as the sixth single on 21 September 2018.

A week before the album's release, Vance Joy posted a 13-second preview of "I'm With You" on his Twitter account, stating that it was one of his favorite tracks on the album. On 19 February, he revealed a 15-second preview of "Little Boy" stating that the song was about when he fell off his bike as a young boy (among other things).

== Critical reception ==
Professional ratings
Review scores
Source	Rating
Clash	7/10
Exclaim!	4/10
The Guardian	2/5 stars
Newsday	3/4 stars
The Times	2/5 stars

Nation of Two received mixed reviews. Will Rosebury from Clash said Joy "...creates a leaner and more cohesive project that thematically focuses on the highs and lows of a romantic relationship. Although occasionally over-sentimental and by its very nature derivative, it is impossible to deny that Joy can write a touching tune." Jenna Mohammed from Exclaim! said Joy "rarely strays from the upbeat, harmonious vocals that made Vance Joy successful in 2014 on Dream Your Life Away", adding the songs are "catchy and fun, but lack originality". Michael Hann from The Guardian said "There's a breezy, easy attractiveness to his melodies, albeit that they never fail to do exactly what you might expect." Glenn Gamboa from Newsday said Joy "has gone deeper and broader, making singalongs that sound even bigger" and concluded "Joy may have lost the power of surprise, but he has replaced it with stronger songs that will stick with fans as long as 'Riptide'."

== Commercial performance ==
Nation of Two debuted at number one on the ARIA Albums Chart, making it Joy's second Australian number-one album. It also debuted at number 10 on the US Billboard 200 with over 28,000 equivalent sales.

== Track listing ==
All tracks are co-produced by Edwin White.

No.	Title	Writer(s)	Producer(s)	Length
1.	"Call If You Need Me"	James Keogh	Ryan Hadlock	2:43
2.	"Lay It on Me"	Keogh; Dave Bassett	Bassett	3:35
3.	"We're Going Home"	Keogh; Dan Wilson	Bassett	3:27
4.	"Saturday Sun"	Keogh; Bassett	Bassett	3:34
5.	"Take Your Time"	Keogh; Bassett	Bassett	3:40
6.	"I'm with You"	Keogh; Simone Felipe	Felipe	4:01
7.	"Like Gold"	Keogh; Wilson	Phil Ek	3:44
8.	"Alone with Me"	Keogh; Wilson	Ek	4:26
9.	"Crashing Into You"	Keogh	Ek; Hadlock	3:09
10.	"One of These Days"	Keogh; Bassett	Bassett	2:58
11.	"Little Boy"	Keogh	Felipe	3:23
12.	"Bonnie & Clyde"	Keogh	Bassett	3:15
13.	"Where We Start"	Keogh; Mikky Ekko	Hadlock	3:20
Total length:				45:15

== Personnel ==
Musicians

- James Keogh – lead vocals (all tracks), electric guitar (tracks 1, 3, 5, 11–13), acoustic guitar (2–12), ukulele (4), Mellotron (6), 12-string guitar (7), banjo (10), piano (11, 12)
- Edwin White – percussion (1–5, 7–13), string arrangement (1, 8, 9); cello, harmonium, vibraphone (1); backing vocals (2, 8, 10, 11), drums (2–5, 7–12), keyboards (2, 4), synthesizer (8, 9), organ (9); electric guitar, piano (13)
- Tom Dziekonski – viola, violin (1)
- Dave Basset – backing vocals (2, 4, 5, 10), bass guitar (2–5, 10, 12), piano (2–5, 10); electric guitar, organ (3, 5); harmonium (5), keyboards (12)
- Brad Gordon – brass, brass arrangement (2, 3, 4, 5, 10); glockenspiel (2)
- Chris Carmichael – string arrangement, strings (3)
- David Baron – synthesizer (6); double bass, programming (11)
- Jeremy Lightfoot – bass guitar (7–9)
- Phil Peterson – cello (8, 9)
- Victoria Parker – violin (8, 9)
- Phil Sparks – bass guitar (13)

Technical

- Greg Calbi – mastering (1, 2, 4, 5, 7–9, 11–13)
- Joe LaPorta – mastering (3, 6, 10)
- John O'Mahony – mixing (1, 2, 12, 13)
- Michael Brauer – mixing (3, 5, 10)
- John Castle – mixing (4)
- Ryan Hewitt – mixing, engineering (6)
- Phil Ek – mixing (7–9), engineering (7, 8)
- David Baron – mixing, engineering (11)
- Ryan Hadlock – engineering (1, 9, 13)
- Taylor Carroll – engineering (1, 9, 13)
- Dave Bassett – engineering (2–5, 10, 12)
- Dave Shiffman – engineering (2–5, 10, 12)
- Tobijah Rogers – engineering assistance (1, 9, 13)
- Morgan Stratton – engineering assistance (2–5, 10)
- Geoff Neal – engineering assistance (2)
- Pete Hanlon – engineering assistance (6, 11)
- Cameron Nicklaus – engineering assistance (7–9)
- David Hagen – engineering assistance (9, 13)
- Stefan Max – executive production

== Charts ==
=== Weekly charts ===
Chart (2018)	Peak position
Australian Albums (ARIA)	1
Belgian Albums (Ultratop Flanders)	70
Belgian Albums (Ultratop Wallonia)	161
Canadian Albums (Billboard)	2
Dutch Albums (Album Top 100)	35
Irish Albums (IRMA)	22
New Zealand Albums (RMNZ)	20
Norwegian Albums (VG-lista)	23
Scottish Albums (OCC)	50
Spanish Albums (PROMUSICAE)	28
Swedish Albums (Sverigetopplistan)	37
Swiss Albums (Schweizer Hitparade)	35
UK Albums (OCC)	32
US Billboard 200	10
US Americana/Folk Albums (Billboard)	1
US Top Rock Albums (Billboard)	3

=== Year-end charts ===
Chart (2018)	Position
Australian Albums (ARIA)	18
US Top Rock Albums (Billboard)	92
Chart (2019)	Position
Australian Albums (ARIA)	82

== Certifications ==
Region	Certification	Certified units/sales
Australia (ARIA)	Platinum	70,000^{‡}
Canada (Music Canada)	Platinum	80,000^{‡}
New Zealand (RMNZ)	Platinum	15,000^{‡}
^{‡} Sales+streaming figures based on certification alone.

== Release history ==
Region	Release date	Format	Label	Catalogs
Australia	23 February 2018	CD; digital download; streaming	Liberation	LRCD0001
Australia	1 June 2018	Vinyl	Liberation	1-566393
Australia	14 September 2018	Limited Edition Vinyl	Liberation	LRLP0001
