= God Loves You When You're Dancing =

EP by Vance Joy
- Released: 22 March 2013
- Genre: Indie pop; indie rock; indie folk; alternative
- Length: 22:10
- Language: English
- Label: Liberation
- Producer: Vance Joy; Edwin White; John Castle

Vance Joy chronology
God Loves You When You're Dancing (2013)	Dream Your Life Away (2014)

Singles from God Loves You When You're Dancing
- 1. "From Afar" Released: 21 January 2013; 2. "Riptide" Released: 21 May 2013

God Loves You When You're Dancing is the debut extended play by Australian singer-songwriter Vance Joy. It was released in Australia on 22 March 2013 via Liberation Music.

The EP was nominated for two awards at the ARIA Music Awards of 2013; Breakthrough Artist - Release, but lost to Flume by Flume and Best Pop Release, but lost to Armageddon by Guy Sebastian.

The EP contains the single, "Riptide", which in May 2015 became the longest-charting song in ARIA Chart history, having remained in the top 100 for 107 weeks and counting. It surpassed previous record holder, Poker Face by Lady Gaga's 106 week record. In January 2016, the week count was at 120.

In March 2019, to celebrate the EP's 6 year anniversary, Joy announced a limited edition 10" of the EP on vinyl for release on 26 April. This was the first time the EP had ever been released on Vinyl and was limited to 1,000 units. As from September of that year, it was accredited by Australian Recording Industry Association (ARIA) with 9× platinum certificates, for shipment of 630,000 units. It had peaked at No. 1 on the ARIA Australian Artists Singles Chart and was still on that chart in that month for 208 weeks; it also peaked at No. 9 on the related ARIA Streaming Singles Chart and was still on that chart for 145 weeks.

== Singles ==
Vance Joy's first single was "From Afar" released on 21 January 2013 and was listed as the last song in the EP. "Riptide" was Vance Joy's second single, released on 21 May 2013. In an interview with Digital Journal Vance Joy admitted to writing its first two lines in 2008 and coming back to it later in 2012. Both songs where also included on his full length album "Dream Your Life Away".

== Critical reception ==
Grace Goodfellow of The Ripe TV gave the extended play a positive review, praising each song and concluding; "Vance Joy isn't just a musician. He is an artist and this EP is his masterpiece. "God Loves You When You're Dancing" is a beautiful piece of art – it really, truly is." Daniel Falconer of Female First UK also praised each track and gave the EP 5 out of 5 saying "Vance Joy is without a doubt one of the most exciting singer-songwriters to emerge from the scores we see on a regular basis, and any fan of music would be a fool not to keep an eye firmly on him." Jon Sidwell of Music Liberation claimed the EP should "please many" and that his voice contained "a striking combination of fragility and confidence".

== Tour ==
God Loves You When You're Dancing Tour
- Tour by Vance Joy
- Location: Oceania
- Associated album: God Loves You When You're Dancing
- Start date: April 18, 2013
- End date: April 30, 2013
- Legs: 1
- No. of shows: 5
- Supporting acts: Falls; Ali Barter; Grizzly Jim Lawrie

Vance Joy concert chronology
- God Loves You When You're Dancing Tour (2013); Riptide Tour (2013)

On February 25, 2013, Joy announced the God Loves You When You're Dancing Tour, his first concert series as a solo artist. In April, due to the demand Vance decided to add two more dates to his tour. Before that, Joy was the opening act, between January and February, for the Icelandic band Of Monsters and Men's tour of the Australia and the Australian singer Julia Stone on her Heavenly Sounds Tour. In March, Vance performed at several major music festivals, including Festival Hall in Melbourne, Secret Garden Festival ins Sydney, SXSW Festival in Austin and The Hills Are Alive Festival in Melbourne. The Joy's tour began on April 8, 2013 in Sydney, Australia at The Vanguard and finished on April 30, 2013 in Melbourne.

== Set list ==
1. "Emmylou"
2. "From Afar"
3. "Red Eye"
4. "Snaggletooth"
5. "Play with Fire"
6. "Riptide"

== Shows ==
List of concerts, showing date, city, country, venue and opening acts
Date	City	Country	Venue	Opening acts
Leg 1 – Oceania
April 18, 2013	Sydney	Australia	The Vanguard	Falls
April 24, 2013	Brisbane	Australia	Black Bear Lodge	N/A
April 27, 2013	Melbourne	Australia	Northcote Social Club	N/A
April 28, 2013	Melbourne	Australia	Northcote Social Club	Ali Barter
April 30, 2013	Melbourne	Australia	Northcote Social Club	Grizzly Jim Lawrie

== Track listing ==
All tracks are written by Vance Joy

God Loves You When You're Dancing track listing
No.	Title	Producer(s)	Length
1.	"Emmylou"	Vance Joy; Edwin White; John Castle	4:40
2.	"Riptide"	Joy; White; Castle; Stefan Max^{[e]}	3:24
3.	"Play with Fire"	Joy; White; Castle	4:23
4.	"Snaggletooth"	Joy; White; Castle	5:19
5.	"From Afar"	Joy^{[c]}; White^{[c]}; Castle; Max^{[e]}	4:24
Total length:			22:11

Notes

- ^{^[c]} signifies a co-producer
- ^{^[e]} signifies an executive producer

== Charts ==
Chart (2019)	Peak position
Australian Artists Singles Chart (ARIA)	1
Streaming Singles Chart (ARIA)	9
US Folk Albums (Billboard)	10
US Heatseekers Albums (Billboard)	13

== Certifications ==
Region	Certification	Certified units/sales
Canada (Music Canada)	Platinum	80,000^{‡}
United States (RIAA)	Gold	500,000^{‡}
^{‡} Sales+streaming figures based on certification alone.

== Release history ==
Region	Release date	Format	Label	
Australia	22 March 2013	CD; digital download	Liberation	LMCD0219
Australia	23 April 2019	Vinyl	Liberation	
