= Saturday Sun (Vance Joy song) =

- Acoustic single art work

Single by Vance Joy

from the album Nation of Two
- Released: 1 February 2018
- Label: Liberation Music
- Songwriter(s): Keogh; Dave Bassett

Vance Joy singles chronology
"We're Going Home" (2018)	"Saturday Sun" (2018)	"Call If You Need Me" (2018)

Music video
- "Saturday Sun" on YouTube

"Saturday Sun" is a song by Australian singer-songwriter Vance Joy and was released on 1 February 2018 as the fourth single from Joy's second studio album Nation of Two.

Joy explains "I wrote this last year when I was in Malibu. I guess it’s about meeting someone really great and not wanting to miss the chance of seeing them again. When I was writing this song, I was travelling from my little AirBnB in Venice Beach to the studio in Malibu and I got to drive my car on this beautiful stretch of coastal highway and I think that drive inspired some of the lyrics."

An acoustic version of the song was released on 4 May 2018.

A Luca Schreiner version of the song was released on 8 June 2018 and a Ryan Riback version on 6 July 2018.

== Music video ==
The video was released on 12 April 2018.

== Reception ==
Brandon John from Tone Deaf said "In keeping with much of his best work, it’s about as hopeful a tune as you could reasonably ask for, dripping with the optimism of a young romantic as Vance proclaims his new love to the sun over bright acoustic and a swelling horn section."

== Track listing ==
Digital download
No.	Title	Length
1.	"Saturday Sun"	3:34

Acoustic Digital download
No.	Title	Length
1.	"Saturday Sun"	2:41

Luca Schreiner Digital download
No.	Title	Length
1.	"Saturday Sun"	3:06

Ryan Riback Digital download
No.	Title	Length
1.	"Saturday Sun"	3:07

== Charts ==
=== Weekly charts ===
Chart (2018)	Peak position
Australia (ARIA)	47
Belgium (Ultratip Bubbling Under Wallonia)	39
Canada Rock (Billboard)	10
US Adult Pop Airplay (Billboard)	35
US Alternative Airplay (Billboard)	8
US Hot Rock & Alternative Songs (Billboard)	13

=== Year-end charts ===
Chart (2018)	Position
US Hot Rock Songs (Billboard)	30

== Certifications ==
Region	Certification	Certified units/sales
Australia (ARIA)	3× Platinum	210,000^{‡}
Brazil (Pro-Música Brasil)	Gold	20,000^{‡}
New Zealand (RMNZ)	Platinum	30,000^{‡}
United Kingdom (BPI)	Silver	200,000^{‡}
United States (RIAA)	Gold	500,000^{‡}
^{‡} Sales+streaming figures based on certification alone.
