= Like Gold =

Single by Vance Joy

from the album Nation of Two
- Released: 3 November 2017
- Genre: Pop rock
- Length: 3:44
- Label: Liberation Music
- Songwriters: James Keogh, Dan Wilson
- Producer: Phil Ek

Vance Joy singles chronology
"Lay It on Me" (2017)	"Like Gold" (2017)	"We're Going Home" (2018)

Live video
- "Like Gold" on YouTube

"Like Gold" is a song by Australian singer-songwriter Vance Joy. It was released on 3 November 2017 as the second single from Joy's album Nation of Two (2018).

Vance wrote "Like Gold" after coming off the road at the start of 2016. Joy said: "It started with a simple melody I was humming and the idea of looking back at a relationship."

In February 2018, Joy said: "I play a different rhythm from anything I've played before. I really like what the producer Phil Ek did with this song with big spacious drums and I like the way it sounds full of life. It's about a love that you're kind of reflecting on and the fire's gone out but there was some really good times in there."

"Like Gold" was certified gold in Australia in 2019.

== Reception ==
Al Newstead from ABC called the song a "slower heart-on-sleeve ballad", saying: "Between hypnotic plucking and gentle prose, he captures the embers of a relationship that "used to roar like an open fire". Emmy Mack from Music Feeds called the song a "rollicking folk toe-tapper [which] sounds like it was custom-made for group campfire singalong."

== Charts ==
Chart performance for "Like Gold"
Chart (2017)	Peak position
Australia (ARIA)	124
Australian Artist Singles (ARIA)	14
US Alternative Digital Song Sales (Billboard)	13
US Hot Rock & Alternative Songs (Billboard)	30
US Rock Digital Song Sales (Billboard)	16

== Certifications ==
Certifications for "Like Gold"
Region	Certification	Certified units/sales
Australia (ARIA)	Platinum	70,000^{‡}
New Zealand (RMNZ)	Gold	15,000^{‡}
^{‡} Sales+streaming figures based on certification alone.
