= We're Going Home (Vance Joy song) =

Single by Vance Joy

from the album Nation of Two
- Released: 12 January 2018
- Genre: Alternative rock
- Length: 3:27
- Label: Liberation Music
- Songwriter(s): Keogh; Dan Wilson

Vance Joy singles chronology
"Like Gold" (2017)	"We're Going Home" (2018)	"Saturday Sun" (2018)

Music video
- "We're Going Home" on YouTube

"We're Going Home" is a song by Australian singer-songwriter Vance Joy and released on 12 January 2018 as the third single from Joy's second studio album Nation of Two.

Joy told Triple J's Ben & Liam the song was written whilst on tour in the US opening for Taylor Swift. Joy said: "It's a song that took me by my surprise. It's about stepping out into the unknown and finding out what you're made of, which I did a bit on that tour. I was definitely scared opening up shows for Taylor Swift. It was kinda scary but I'm glad this song arrived."

At the APRA Music Awards of 2019, the song was nominated for Most Played Australian Work and Pop Work of the Year.

== Music video ==
The official music video was directed by Mimi Cave and was released on 10 January 2018.

Dancers: Kent Boyd, Sarah Butler, Shauna Davis, Jessica Franco, Sarah Printz, Gary Reagan and Pia Vinson

== Reception ==
Tyler Jenke from Tone Deaf said: "A tender, emotional track that showcases Vance Joy at his finest. "We're Going Home" has that rare quality of being an introspective, poignant tune that features a huge chorus; perfect for reflection, or for belting out from the front row of one of his concerts."

== Charts ==
=== Weekly charts ===
Chart (2018)	Peak position
Australia (ARIA)	16

=== Year-end charts ===
Chart (2018)	Position
Australia (ARIA)	98

== Certifications ==
Region	Certification	Certified units/sales
Australia (ARIA)	3× Platinum	210,000^{‡}
New Zealand (RMNZ)	Gold	15,000^{‡}
^{‡} Sales+streaming figures based on certification alone.
