= Wasted Time (Vance Joy song) =

2014 song by Vance Joy

Song by Vance Joy

from the album Dream Your Life Away
- Released: 5 September 2014
- Recorded: 2013
- Genre: Indie pop; Indie folk
- Length: 5:00
- Label: Liberation Music
- Songwriter(s): Vance Joy
- Producer(s): Ryan Hadlock

"Wasted Time" is a song by Australian singer-songwriter Vance Joy, the song is included on his debut studio album Dream Your Life Away (2014). It is the third track on the album. The track was never released as a single, however, it managed to peak at number 43 on the Australian Singles Chart, and number 50 on the Canadian Hot 100.

== Chart performance ==
Chart (2014)	Peak position
Australia (ARIA)	43
Canada (Canadian Hot 100)	50
US Hot Rock & Alternative Songs (Billboard)	27
