= Ryan Hadlock =

American record producer (born 1978)

- Born: 1978 (age 47–48)
- Origin: Woodinville, Washington, United States
- Genres: Rock; alternative rock; grunge
- Occupations: Musician; record producer; mixing engineer
- Instruments: Drums; guitar; keyboard

Ryan Hadlock (born 1978) is an American record producer, best known for his production work on platinum-selling album The Lumineers by The Lumineers.

== Career ==
Hadlock has been around music his entire life, as his parents Joe and Manny Hadlock founded Bear Creek Studio in 1977. The studio has remained family-owned for two generations, and is now headed by Ryan. Joe Hadlock was in a number of Seattle bands, and their family home and studio were places where creativity was always encouraged, and part of the fabric of business and socializing. Ryan grew up around famous musicians, but also many talented studio players who didn't achieve fame, but taught him much about how records were crafted. Hadlock studied sound recording in London and at The Evergreen State College. In London, he produced albums at the Abbey Road Studios and by influential Olympia indie rock band Gossip, as well as the first record by Johnny Flynn, and has assisted Gil Norton, David A. Stewart, and Joe Chiccarelli. Hadlock is known more recently for his work on Vance Joy's album Dream Your Life Away. He is a co-producer of Vance Joy's single "Fire and Flood" released on July 24, 2015.

== Notable producer credits ==
- The Lumineers (2012)
- Dream Your Life Away (2014)
- From Austin (2022)
- Isaac Soren (2022)
