= Georgia (Vance Joy song) =

Single by Vance Joy

from the album Dream Your Life Away
- Released: 9 November 2014
- Recorded: 2013–2014
- Genre: Indie pop; indie folk
- Length: 3:50
- Label: Liberation Music
- Songwriter: Vance Joy
- Producer: Ryan Hadlock

Vance Joy singles chronology
"First Time" (2014)	"Georgia" (2014)	"Fire and the Flood" (2015)

Music video
- "Georgia" on YouTube

"Georgia" is a song by Australian singer-songwriter Vance Joy. The song was released on 9 November 2014 as the third single from his debut studio album Dream Your Life Away (2014). The song has peaked at number 15 on the Australian Singles Chart.

"Georgia" is a homage not only to a girl and falling in love, but also to Ray Charles' song "Georgia on My Mind".

Joy names "Georgia" as one of his favourite songs on the album.

It featured in the Australian soap opera Neighbours on 8 April 2016, when long running character Kyle Canning (Chris Milligan) left the show to reunite with his wife, Georgia Brooks (Saskia Hampele).

== Background ==
Joy began writing "Georgia" in 2006, then sat on it until he figured out the words and melody eight years later. "It was New Year's Day in 2014, and I just sat down and started playing those chords," he says. "Somehow, I just found the right combination, found a way to put words over the top of the riff that sounded right. That's always a magic moment."

== Music video ==
The video was directed by Luci Schroder, with whom Joy worked on the video for previous single "Mess Is Mine". It premiered on YouTube on 26 March 2015. The video shows a battalion of soldiers in a deadly battle during an unspecified war. At one point, two soldiers are ambushed, and one of them is seriously wounded and the soldiers intimately kiss. It then shows several crew members filming the scene become overwhelmed with emotion.

"When you get a good pitch like Luci's, it makes it easy for me to say 'yes' to it because I think it stands out," Joy said. "One of the goals when deciding on a [music video] is you want something to be memorable or at least to spark some kind of thought or resonate with people in a way."

It was nominated for Best Video at the ARIA Music Awards of 2015.

== Charts ==
=== Weekly charts ===
Chart (2015)	Peak position
Australia (ARIA)	15

=== Year-end charts ===
Chart (2015)	Position
Australia (ARIA)	72

== Certifications ==
Region	Certification	Certified units/sales
Australia (ARIA)	5× Platinum	350,000^{‡}
Brazil (Pro-Música Brasil)	Gold	30,000^{‡}
Canada (Music Canada)	2× Platinum	160,000^{‡}
Denmark (IFPI Danmark)	Gold	45,000^{‡}
New Zealand (RMNZ)	2× Platinum	60,000^{‡}
United Kingdom (BPI)	Gold	400,000^{‡}
United States (RIAA)	Platinum	1,000,000^{‡}
^{‡} Sales+streaming figures based on certification alone.
