= Dream Your Life Away =

Studio album by Vance Joy
- Released: 5 September 2014
- Recorded: 2012–2013
- Studios: Bear Creek; Cosmix, Vienna, Austria; Dean St., London, England; Eller, San Pancho, Mexico; Red Door; Magic Shop, New York City; The Shed; The Warehouse, Vancouver, Canada
- Genres: Indie; indie folk; indie pop
- Length: 49:00
- Labels: Liberation Music (Australia and New Zealand); Atlantic (United States); Warner Music (international)
- Producers: Ryan Hadlock; Vance Joy; Edwin White; John Castle

Vance Joy chronology
God Loves You When You're Dancing (2013)	Dream Your Life Away (2014)	Nation of Two (2018)

Singles from Dream Your Life Away
- 1. "Mess Is Mine" Released: 9 July 2014; 2. "First Time" Released: 4 August 2014; 3. "Georgia" Released: 9 November 2014

Dream Your Life Away is the debut studio album by Australian singer-songwriter Vance Joy. It was released in Australia and New Zealand on 5 September 2014 via Liberation Music. The album was released on 9 September 2014 in the US via Atlantic Records and worldwide via Warner Music. The album has peaked to number 1 on the Australian Albums Chart. A deluxe edition was released on 4 September 2015, consisting of two new tracks and five live tracks.

As of January 2018, the album has worldwide sales over 2 million.

== Background ==
During a performance in Boston, Vance Joy explained that the song "My Kind of Man" included advice his uncle once gave him when he was young. However, he later learned from his father that the quoted advice was actually from a Lynyrd Skynyrd song. Vance Joy noted that, though the lyrics changed, the message stayed the same: "Find something you love and understand."

== Singles ==
- "Mess Is Mine" was released on 9 July 2014 as the album's lead single. The song peaked at number 33 on the Australian Singles Chart.
- "First Time" was released on 4 August 2014 as the album's second single.
- "Georgia" was released on 9 November 2014 as the album's third single. It peaked at number 11 on the Australian Singles Chart.
- "Fire and the Flood" was released in July 2015 as the first single on the deluxe re-issue of the album, and fourth overall. The song peaked at number 6 on the ARIA charts.
- "Straight into Your Arms" was released in February 2016 as the album's final single.

The album also includes the singles "From Afar" and "Riptide", previously released on Joy's debut EP God Loves You When You're Dancing.

== Critical reception ==
Professional ratings
Review scores
Source	Rating
AllMusic	3/5 stars
Clash	6/10
musicOMH	2.5/5 stars
PopMatters	7/10
Rolling Stone Australia	4/5 stars

Timothy Monger from AllMusic noted that the album is "built around the centerpiece of 'Riptide'" and that it "offers up a dozen or so additional songs in that familiar mold of romantic, introspective, acoustic folk-pop". He felt that the album "focuses on gently picked lovelorn pleas and somewhat uninspired romantic phrasing" and commented that it "seems a bit too middle of the road to really distinguish him from the crowded pack of similar young bards." Clash writer Jack Scourfield praised the album's "heartfelt honesty" that can "spread the youthful nostalgia adeptly across any generational gaps." He also noted that the album "does become prone to dragging during some of its less well-defined, slower numbers." Jaymz Clements for Rolling Stone Australia gave Dream Your Life Away a positive review, stating that the album effectively "[shows] there's more to Vance Joy than 'Riptide'", noting that the album is "confident, self-assured and classically Australian, with an appeal that's universal."

== Commercial performance ==
On 13 September 2014 the album entered the Australian Albums Chart at number one. It is the eleventh album to reach number one for an Australian act in 2014 and the first time ever that the Liberation label have landed back-to-back number ones after Jimmy Barnes's album 30:30 Hindsight reached number one the previous week. In the United States, the album peaked at number 17 on the US Billboard 200 chart and number two on the Top Alternative Albums chart. The album was eventually certified two-times Platinum by the Recording Industry Association of America (RIAA) for combined sales and album-equivalent units of over two million units in the United States.

== Track listing ==
All tracks are written by Vance Joy.

Standard edition
No.	Title	Producer(s)	Length
1.	"Winds of Change"	Ryan Hadlock	2:15
2.	"Mess Is Mine"	Hadlock	3:43
3.	"Wasted Time"	Hadlock	5:00
4.	"Riptide"	Vance Joy; Edwin White; John Castle	3:21
5.	"Who Am I"	Hadlock	2:39
6.	"From Afar"	Joy; White; Castle	4:23
7.	"We All Die Trying to Get It Right"	Hadlock	4:07
8.	"Georgia"	Hadlock	3:50
9.	"Red Eye"	Hadlock	5:03
10.	"First Time"	Hadlock	3:44
11.	"All I Ever Wanted"	Hadlock	3:36
12.	"Best That I Can"	White	3:30
13.	"My Kind of Man"	Hadlock	3:49
Total length:			49:00

Special edition
No.	Title	Length
14.	"Fire and the Flood"	4:09
15.	"Straight into Your Arms" (bonus track)	3:37
Total length:		56:56

Deluxe edition
No.	Title	Length
14.	"Fire and the Flood"	4:09
15.	"Straight into Your Arms"	3:37
16.	"Wasted Time" (live from Philadelphia)	5:07
17.	"Mess is Mine" (live from Philadelphia)	3:37
18.	"Georgia" (live from Melbourne)	4:09
19.	"Best That I Can" (live from Melbourne)	5:11
20.	"Riptide" (live from Dublin)	3:39
Total length:		78:29

== Personnel ==
- Jono Colliver – bass guitar, background vocals
- Ryan Hadlock – acoustic guitar, electric guitar, keyboards, percussion, synthesizer
- Lauren Jacobson – viola, violin
- James Keogh – acoustic guitar, electric guitar, piano, synthesizer bass, ukulele, lead vocals, background vocals
- Kimo Muraki – saxophone, background vocals
- Jerry Streeter – background vocals
- Adam Trachsel – bass guitar, upright bass
- Edwin White – brass arrangements, cello, drums, electric guitar, keyboards, percussion, string arrangements, synthesizer, synthesizer programming, background vocals

== Charts ==
=== Weekly charts ===
Weekly chart performance for Dream Your Life Away
Chart (2014)	Peak position
Australian Albums (ARIA)	1
Belgian Albums (Ultratop Flanders)	94
Belgian Albums (Ultratop Wallonia)	166
Canadian Albums (Billboard)	2
Dutch Albums (Album Top 100)	130
Irish Albums (IRMA)	26
New Zealand Albums (RMNZ)	40
Norwegian Albums (VG-lista)	23
Scottish Albums (Official Charts)	22
Swedish Albums (Sverigetopplistan)	13
Swiss Albums (Schweizer Hitparade)	23
UK Albums (Official Charts)	20
US Billboard 200	17
US Americana/Folk Albums (Billboard)	2
US Top Alternative Albums (Billboard)	2
US Top Rock Albums (Billboard)	5

2024 weekly chart performance for Dream Your Life Away
Chart (2024)	Peak position
Dutch Albums (Album Top 100)	67
Hungarian Physical Albums (MAHASZ)	40

=== Year-end charts ===
Year-end chart performance for Dream Your Life Away
Chart (2014)	Position
Australian Albums (ARIA)	44
US Top Alternative Albums (Billboard)	45
US Folk Albums (Billboard)	15
US Top Rock Albums (Billboard)	74
Chart (2015)	Position
Australian Albums (ARIA)	16
Swedish Albums (Sverigetopplistan)	86
US Billboard 200	66
US Top Rock Albums (Billboard)	17
Chart (2016)	Position
Australian Albums (ARIA)	70
Chart (2017)	Position
Australian Albums (ARIA)	64
Chart (2018)	Position
Australian Albums (ARIA)	56

=== Decade-end charts ===
Decade-end chart performance for Dream Your Life Away
Chart (2010–2019)	Position
Australian Albums (ARIA)	73

== Certifications ==
Certifications for Dream Your Life Away
Region	Certification	Certified units/sales
Australia (ARIA)	2× Platinum	140,000^{‡}
Canada (Music Canada)	4× Platinum	320,000^{‡}
Denmark (IFPI Danmark)	Platinum	20,000^{‡}
Italy (FIMI)	Gold	25,000^{‡}
New Zealand (RMNZ)	3× Platinum	45,000^{‡}
United Kingdom (BPI)	Gold	100,000^{‡}
United States (RIAA)	2× Platinum	2,000,000^{‡}
^{‡} Sales+streaming figures based on certification alone.

== Release history ==
Release history and formats for Dream Your Life Away
Region	Release date	Format	Label	Catalog
Australia	5 September 2014	CD; digital download	Liberation	LMCD0247
New Zealand	5 September 2014	CD; digital download	Liberation	LMCD0247
Various	9 September 2014	CD; digital download	Atlantic; Warner	7567867185
Australia	24 September 2014	LP	Liberation	A5451701
Australia	4 September 2015	CD; digital download (deluxe)	Liberation	LMCD0314
Australia	14 September 2018	Limited edition LP	Liberation	LRLP0005
