= Lay It on Me (Vance Joy song) =

Single by Vance Joy

from the album Nation of Two
- Released: 12 July 2017
- Genre: Indie
- Length: 3:34
- Label: Liberation Music
- Songwriters: Dave Bassett; James Keogh
- Producer: James Keogh

Vance Joy singles chronology
"Straight into Your Arms" (2016)	"Lay It on Me" (2017)	"Like Gold" (2017)

Music video
- "Lay It on Me" on YouTube

"Lay It on Me" is a song by Australian singer-songwriter Vance Joy and released on 12 July 2017. It is the first single from his album Nation of Two.

The song premiered on Triple J on 13 July 2017, and is about being in a relationship and letting your defences down. Joy said "Lay It on Me" was recorded in Malibu, California and came together on the basis of an old phone recording looking for a home. "I wrote the guitar riff for this song in 2012 [and] I tried to write lyrics to it for ages. I remember being at SXSW in 2013/4 and just that riff was still there. The start of this year it all came together... once you have the right lyrics and ingredients the song comes together really quickly. I think Paul Kelly described them as odd socks, you have them lying around looking for another match."

At the ARIA Music Awards of 2018, the song was nominated for Song of the Year.

== Music video ==
The video was directed by Mimi Cave and was released on 12 July 2017.

== Charts ==
=== Weekly charts ===
Chart (2017–18)	Peak position
Australia (ARIA)	18
Canada Rock (Billboard)	7
US Adult Pop Airplay (Billboard)	31
US Hot Rock & Alternative Songs (Billboard)	12
US Rock & Alternative Airplay (Billboard)	6

=== Year-end charts ===
Chart (2017)	Position
Australia (ARIA)	90
US Hot Rock Songs (Billboard)	46
US Rock Airplay (Billboard)	24

== Certifications ==
Region	Certification	Certified units/sales
Australia (ARIA)	4× Platinum	280,000^{‡}
Canada (Music Canada)	2× Platinum	160,000^{‡}
New Zealand (RMNZ)	Platinum	30,000^{‡}
United States (RIAA)	Gold	500,000^{‡}
^{‡} Sales+streaming figures based on certification alone.
