= Vance Joy =

Australian singer-songwriter (born 1987)

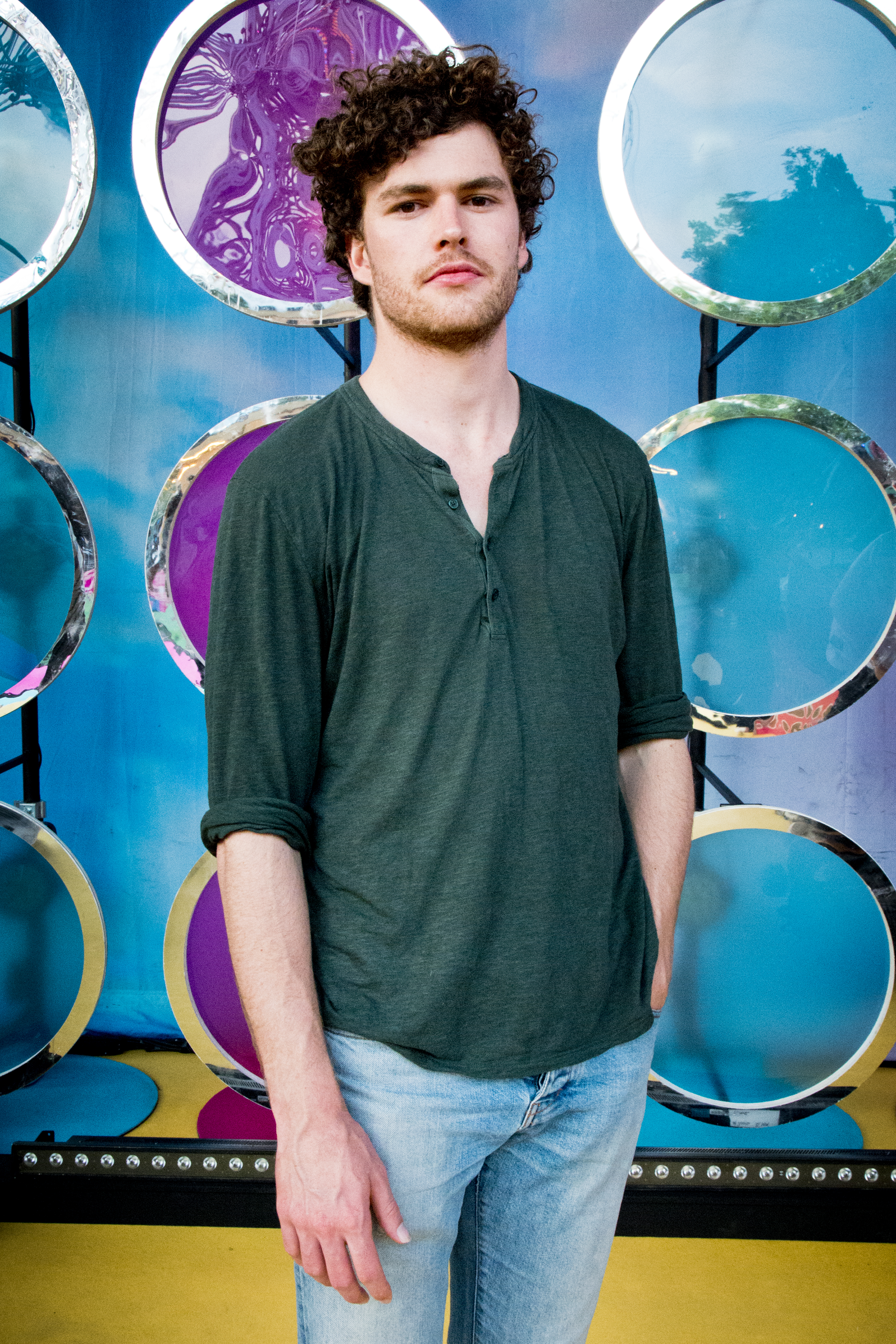
- Joy in 2014

Background information
- Born: James Gabriel Keogh; 1 December 1987 (age 38); Melbourne, Victoria, Australia
- Genres: Folk; indie; acoustic pop
- Occupations: Singer; songwriter
- Instruments: Vocals; ukulele; guitar; piano
- Years active: 2013–present
- Labels: Liberation; Infectious; F-Stop; Atlantic
- Spouse: Selen Us (m. 2023)
- Website: vancejoy.com
Australian rules football career
Personal information
- Position: Defender
Playing career
Years	Club	Games (Goals)
2008–2009	Coburg	28

James Gabriel Keogh (born 1 December 1987), known professionally as Vance Joy, is an Australian singer, songwriter, musician, and former Australian rules footballer. He is best known for his 2013 hit song "Riptide".

Joy signed a five-album deal with Atlantic Records in 2013. He released his debut EP God Loves You When You're Dancing in March 2013. His song "Riptide" was voted number 1 on the 2013 Triple J Hottest 100. Joy released his debut studio album Dream Your Life Away on 5 September 2014 in Australia and on 9 September 2014 elsewhere. At the ARIA Music Awards of 2015, he won Best Male Artist. His second studio album, Nation of Two, was released in 2018, and his third studio album, In Our Own Sweet Time, was released in June 2022.

== Early life and education ==
James Gabriel Keogh was born on 1 December 1987. His father worked in the computer trade, while his mother was a high-school English teacher. His paternal grandparents immigrated to Australia from Ireland. He attended St. Patrick's Primary School, Murrumbeena, in Melbourne. He was school captain at and graduated from St Kevin's College, Toorak, in 2005, and later graduated from Monash University with a Bachelor of Arts and Bachelor of Laws.

== Football ==
Prior to his music career, Joy was a promising Australian rules football player. In 2008 and 2009, he played for the Coburg Football Club as a key defender in the Victorian Football League, winning best first year player award in 2008.

Joy explains his choice for a music career over a football one by saying that he "wasn't ever really in the mix (for the AFL)", being "good enough to go from local footy to the AFL. Out of three seasons, I had a handful of games. You always think you can do better, but I think I reached my potential as a football player." In another interview, he stated "for a period of time I was super focused on footy, I played a step below professional level. I had opportunities to play for a couple of teams but my heart wasn't completely in it. I guess I was just doing something in the meantime before writing my first songs".

== Music career ==
=== 2013: God Loves You When You're Dancing ===
On 21 January 2013, Joy released his debut single "From Afar". On 22 March 2013, he released his debut EP God Loves You When You're Dancing. The single "Riptide" became a success on Australian commercial radio, peaking at number 6 on the ARIA Singles Chart and being certified Nine times platinum by the Australian Record Industry Association (ARIA). The song featured in a GoPro TV advertising campaign in the USA. "Riptide" was a worldwide commercial success, helping to launch Joy's career, and became the longest-charting song in ARIA Charts' history. The song is also certified 5× platinum in the United States.

"Riptide" was inspired by a motel Joy visited as a kid. "As a child, I used to go on family holidays down the coast of Australia", Joy told the Brand Alley blog. "While we were there, we would stay at this motel called Riptide. So that's where that part of the idea came from." In an interview with Soundcheck in January 2014, Joy discussed his upcoming studio album. saying "I think there's always a bit of variety with my songwriting, so probably the EP is a good reflection of what the rest of the album will be like. It's all different songs, I guess, but all tied together in a way." Joy said in an interview with Triple J about his stage name, "I was going through a Peter Carey phase and reading a lot of his books. There's a book called Bliss. The main character's name is Harry Joy and his grandfather is Vance Joy. He's the storyteller and a crazy old man. Plus, I thought it was a cool name."

=== 2014–2016: Dream Your Life Away ===
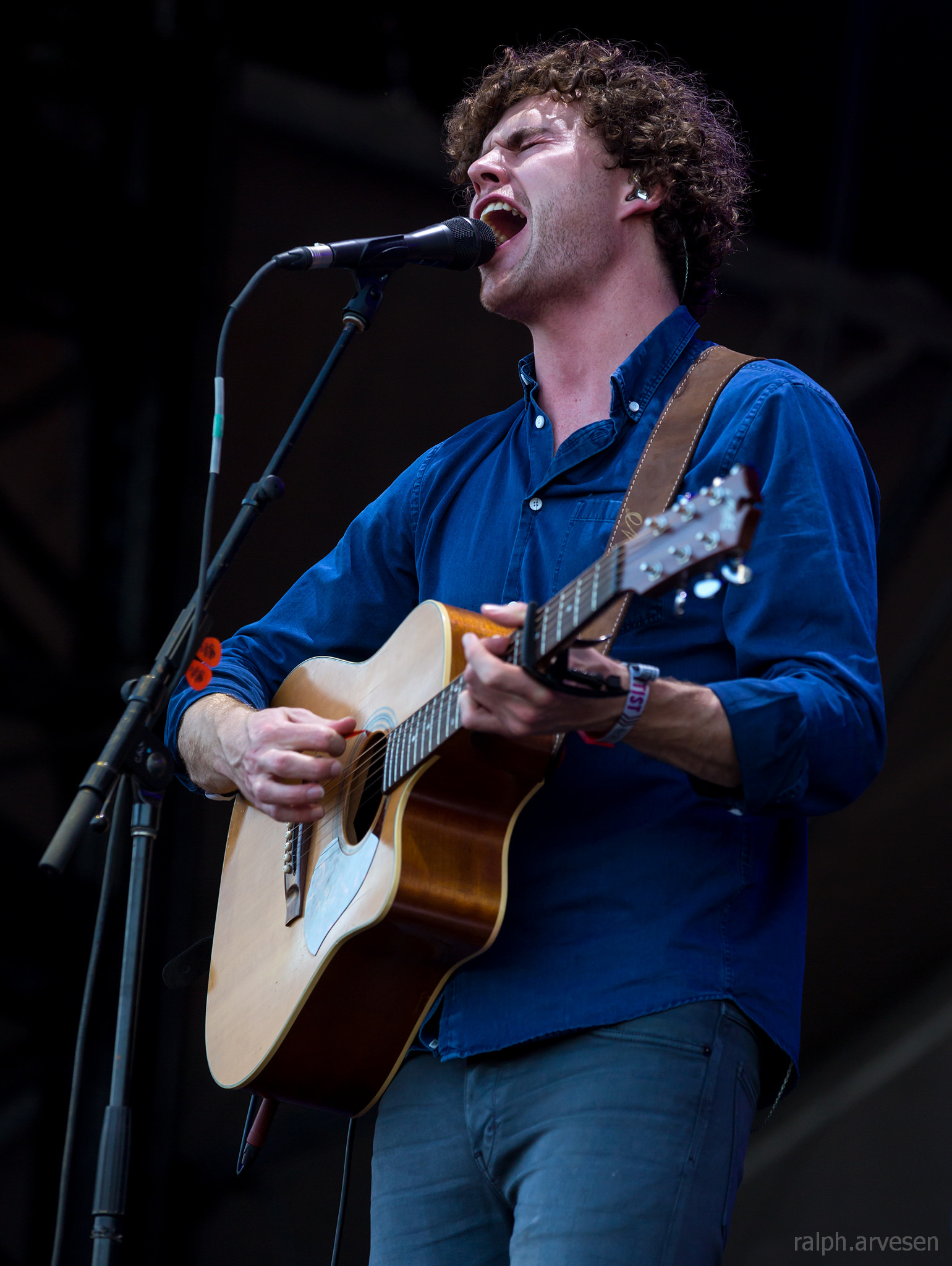
Joy at the Austin City Limits Music Festival in Austin, Texas in 2015

On 15 July 2014, Joy announced the title of his debut album, Dream Your Life Away, which was released on 5 September 2014 in Australia, 9 September 2014 in the United States, and 15 September 2014 worldwide. In July 2014, he released "Mess Is Mine" as the third overall single from the album, with the song peaking at number 37 in Australia. He gave his first live concert with songs on the album in September 2014, in Melbourne. On 7 September 2014, Joy released "First Time" as the fourth single from the album in the United Kingdom.

"Georgia" was released as a single in February 2015. Speaking to Rolling Stone, Joy revealed that he began writing "Georgia" in 2006, then sat on it until he figured out the words and melody. A deluxe edition was released on 4 September 2015, which consisted of two new tracks and five live songs. "Fire and the Flood" and "Straight into Your Arms" were also released as singles, with "Fire and the Flood" later being certified platinum by ARIA. He promoted his album on the Dream Your Life Away Tour, which began on 17 October 2013 in Dallas, Texas.

Joy was announced as the support act for Taylor Swift's 1989 World Tour on 3 November 2014. Joy appeared on all the tour dates in North America, the United Kingdom and Australia. Swift performed a rendition of "Riptide" on 9 October 2014 for the BBC's 'Live Lounge' segment. In November 2015, he was picked as Elvis Duran's Artist of the Month and was featured on the American television network NBC's Today, where he performed his hit single "Riptide".

On 13 May 2015, he performed "Riptide" in a duet featuring Quentin Alexander live to a standing ovation at the Dolby Theatre during the season 14 finale of American Idol. On 16 June 2015, Joy released "Great Summer", a single from the soundtrack for Paper Towns. At the ARIA Music Awards of 2015 he won the Best Male Artist category for Dream Your Life Away, with six further nominations. In May of 2015, Joy was named the Grand Prize winner of the 2014 prestigious International Songwriting Competition (ISC) for the song "Riptide."

=== 2017–2020: Nation of Two and Live at Red Rocks Amphitheatre ===
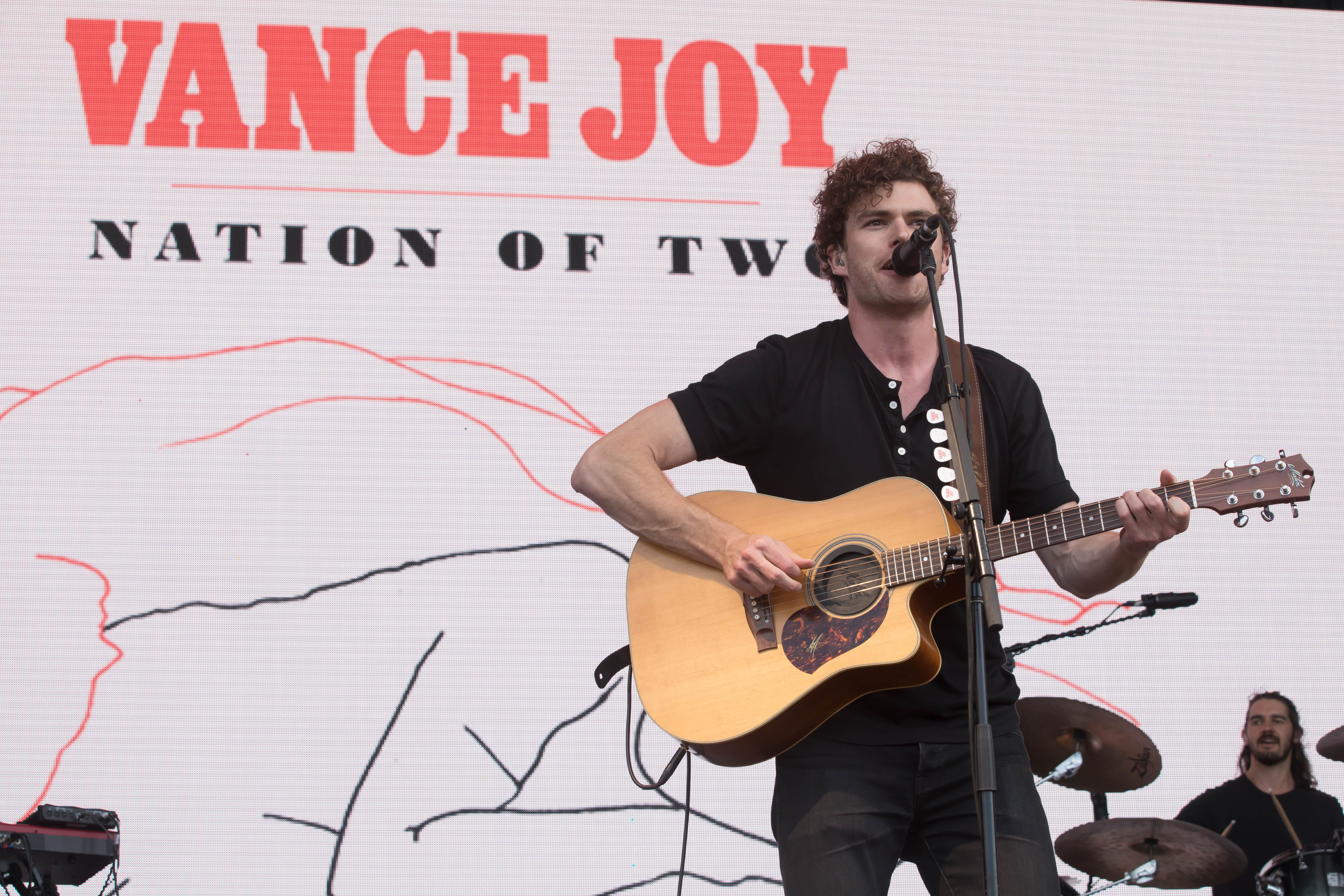
Joy performing in 2018 during the Nation of Two World Tour

In 2017, Joy released two singles from his forthcoming second studio album: "Lay It on Me" in July, which was nominated for Song of the Year at the ARIA Music Awards of 2018, and "Like Gold" in November, which peaked at number 14 on the Australian charts. The song was certified Gold by ARIA in 2019. He released "We're Going Home" on 12 January 2018, which was written while Joy was opening for the 1989 World Tour in 2015. "Saturday Sun" was released on 1 February 2018 as the fourth single, which he stated was inspired by the beaches along the Pacific Coast Highway in Los Angeles.

The last single before the album's release, "Call If You Need Me", was released on 11 February 2018, and appeared on the Billboard Hot Rock & Alternative Songs chart. Joy released his second studio album Nation of Two on 23 February 2018. The album debuted at number 1 in Australia, was certified gold and won Best Adult Contemporary Album at the ARIA Music Awards of 2018. He released an upbeat, remastered version of "I'm With You" as a single from the album on 21 September 2018, which was certified platinum by the ARIA. In November 2018, Joy released a live album titled Live at Red Rocks Amphitheatre, a live concert album of the Nation of Two World Tour, recorded at the Red Rocks Amphitheatre in Colorado. Joy was the opening act for P!nk on her Beautiful Trauma World Tour in 2019.

=== 2021–present: In Our Own Sweet Time ===
On 29 January 2021, Vance released the single "You", a collaboration with Benny Blanco and Marshmello.

On 20 May 2021, Joy released the single "Missing Piece". The song was featured on the episode of Grey's Anatomy airing that night. The song reached platinum status in Australia and won the ARIA Award for Best Video at the 2021 ARIA Music Awards.

On 7 April 2022, Vance announced his third studio album, In Our Own Sweet Time, which was released on 10 June 2022.

In 2023, Joy collaborated with Noah Cyrus to release the single "Everybody Needs Someone".

From January to March 2026 Vance supported Ed Sheeran on the New Zealand and Australian shows of his Loop Tour.

== Personal life ==
In November 2022, Joy announced his engagement to his Turkish girlfriend Selen Us at GQ's Men of the Year Awards. They married in June 2023. Selen studies in Barcelona where they live for the time being. Us gave birth to their daughter Gigi in early 2024. Joy said his song "Missing Piece" was inspired by Us.

== Discography ==
- Dream Your Life Away (2014)
- Nation of Two (2018)
- In Our Own Sweet Time (2022)

== Tours ==
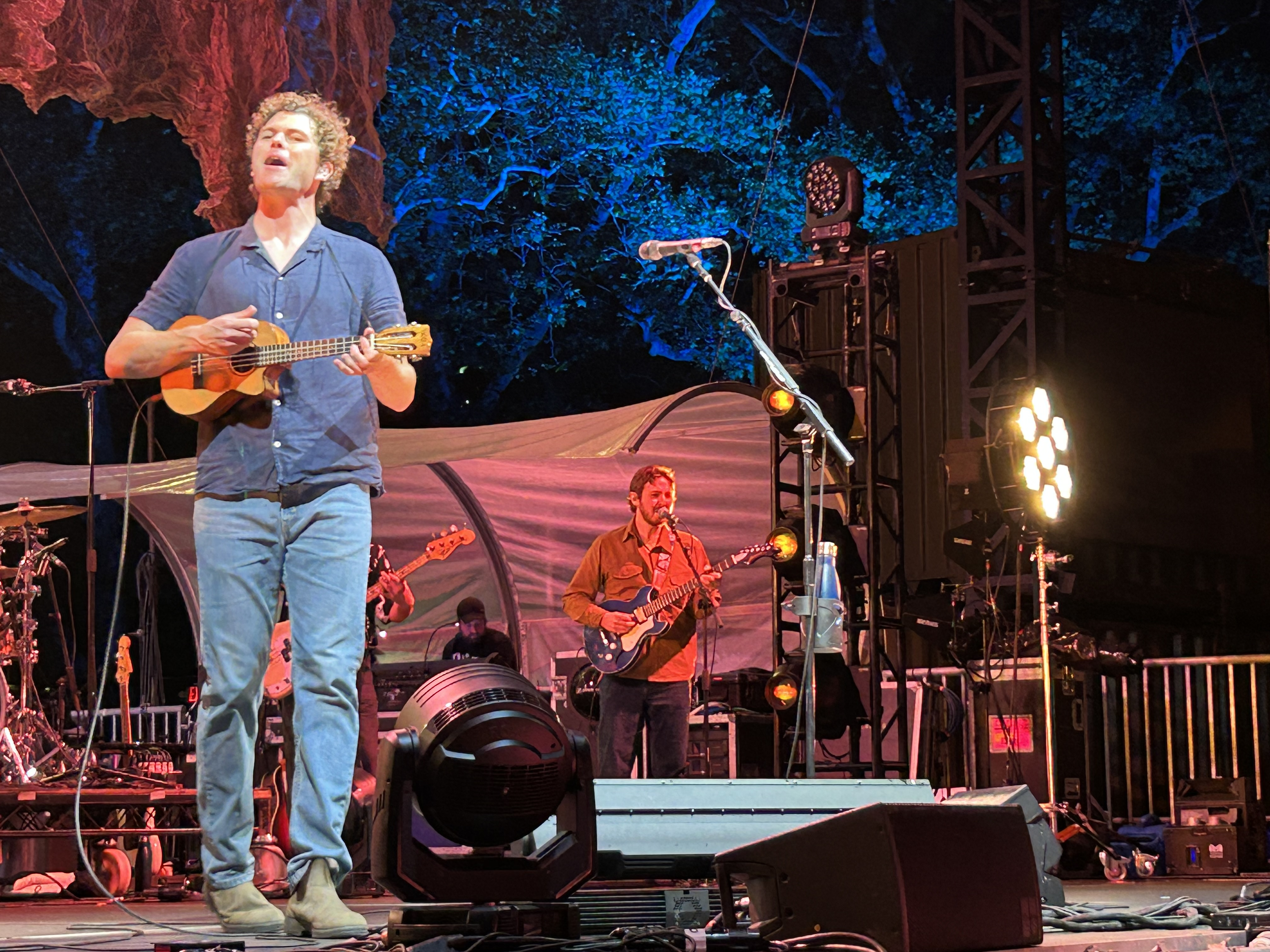
Vance Joy performs on the In Our Own Sweet Time Tour in Central Park, New York on August 30, 2023.

Headlining

- Riptide Tour (2013)
- Dream Your Life Away Tour (2014–2015)
- The Fire and the Flood Tour (2016)
- Lay It On Me Tour (2017)
- Nation of Two World Tour (2018)
- Long Way Home Tour (2022)
- In Our Own Sweet Time Tour (2023)

Promotional concerts

- God Loves You When You're Dancing Tour (2013)
- We're Going Home Tour (2018)

Opening act

- The 1989 World Tour (2015)
- Beautiful Trauma World Tour (2019)
- Loop Tour (2026)
