= From Afar (song) =

By Vance Joy, 2013

Single by Vance Joy

from the EP God Loves You When You're Dancing
- Released: 21 January 2013
- Recorded: 2012
- Genre: Indie pop; indie folk
- Length: 4:24
- Label: Liberation Music
- Songwriter: Vance Joy
- Producers: Vance Joy; Edwin White; John Castle

Vance Joy singles chronology
"From Afar" (2013)	"Riptide" (2013)

Music video
- "From Afar" on YouTube

"From Afar" is the debut single by Australian singer-songwriter Vance Joy. It was first released on 21 January 2013 as the lead single from Joy's debut EP God Loves You When You're Dancing (2013). It is also featured on his debut studio album Dream Your Life Away (2014).

Joy said "I wrote [it] in 2010 and wrote the outro in 2012, and it’s a been a song I've played regularly the last couple of years because I just think it's a really universal theme of loving someone from a distance. It's a sad kind of song though the outro is a bit more upbeat and slightly more epic. That was something that happened when we produced the song. It's an old favourite of mine anyway."

The song was certified platinum in Australia in 2018.

== Music video ==
The music video for "From Afar" was directed by Lara Kose, co-directed by Charlie Ford and Josh Mckie and released on 14 February 2013.

== Certifications ==
Region	Certification	Certified units/sales
Australia (ARIA)	Platinum	70,000^{‡}
^{‡} Sales+streaming figures based on certification alone.
