= Fire and the Flood =

Song by Vance Joy

Single by Vance Joy

from the album Dream Your Life Away
- Released: 24 July 2015
- Recorded: Los Angeles, 2015
- Genre: Indie pop; indie folk
- Length: 4:09
- Label: Liberation Music
- Songwriters: Benny Blanco; Vance Joy; Mikkel Storleer Eriksen; Tor Erik Hermansen
- Producer: Benny Blanco Stargate

Vance Joy singles chronology
"Georgia" (2015)	"Fire and the Flood" (2015)	"Straight into Your Arms" (2016)

Music video
- "Fire and the Flood" on YouTube

"Fire and the Flood" is a song by Australian singer-songwriter Vance Joy and released on 24 July 2015 as the first single from deluxe edition (and fourth overall) of his debut studio album Dream Your Life Away (2014). It was also featured in the Warner Bros CGI-animated film Storks.

== Background ==
Joy wrote the song in February 2015 and recorded it in Los Angeles. Joy explains; "There was a couple of moments when the song started coming together. I wrote this guitar riff that ended up being the line that the horns play and just a few lyrics that were rolling around in my head... When we were recording it, it feels like an epic song so we may as well treat it that way."

== Music video ==
The music video was directed by Hayley Young and released on 22 July 2015.

The video features Joy staring down the barrel of the camera while some dramatic scenes unfold in the background.

The song was used by the Country Fire Authority in 2020 for a short video 'Skilled and Ready' celebrating the volunteer fire and emergency response agency.

== Track listing ==
Digital download
No.	Title	Length
1.	"Fire and the Flood"	4:09

== Charts ==
=== Weekly charts ===
Chart (2015–16)	Peak position
Australia (ARIA)	6
Canada Hot 100 (Billboard)	67
Canada Rock (Billboard)	7
US Adult Pop Airplay (Billboard)	24
US Hot Rock & Alternative Songs (Billboard)	16
US Rock & Alternative Airplay (Billboard)	6

=== Year-end charts ===
Chart (2015)	Position
Australia (ARIA)	46
Chart (2016)	Position
US Hot Rock Songs (Billboard)	55
US Rock Airplay (Billboard)	30

== Certifications ==
Region	Certification	Certified units/sales
Australia (ARIA)	5× Platinum	350,000^{‡}
Canada (Music Canada)	2× Platinum	160,000^{‡}
New Zealand (RMNZ)	Platinum	30,000^{‡}
United States (RIAA)	Platinum	1,000,000^{‡}
^{‡} Sales+streaming figures based on certification alone.

== In Movies ==
- This song would be used in the 2016 film Storks.
