= Riptide (Vance Joy song) =

2013 single by Vance Joy

Single by Vance Joy

from the EP God Loves You When You're Dancing
- Written: 2008
- Released: 21 May 2013
- Recorded: 2012
- Genre: Indie folk; folk-pop; indie pop; twee pop
- Length: 3:24
- Label: Liberation; Infectious; Atlantic
- Songwriter: Vance Joy
- Producers: Vance Joy; Edwin White; John Castle

Vance Joy singles chronology
"From Afar" (2013)	"Riptide" (2013)	"Mess Is Mine" (2014)

Music video
- "Riptide" on YouTube

"Riptide" is a song by Australian singer-songwriter Vance Joy. It was first released as a track on his debut EP God Loves You When You're Dancing (2013), serving as its second single, and is also featured on his debut studio album, Dream Your Life Away (2014). The song was written by Joy, who also produced it with drummer Edwin White. The upbeat song has been lyrically described as a "coming of age love story" and is known for its metaphors and pop culture references.

The song received positive reviews from music critics, who praised its lyrics, vocals and production and drew comparisons to singer-songwriters Paul Kelly and Jeff Buckley. "Riptide" would go on to have commercial success in Australia, peaking at number six on the ARIA singles chart and subsequently being named the number one song in radio station Triple J's Hottest 100 of 2013. The following year, "Riptide" also peaked at number ten in the United Kingdom and entered Billboard's Alternative Songs chart, peaking at number 1. By May 2015, it was the second longest charting single still in the US Billboard Hot 100, appearing on that list for 43 weeks (at number 42 from its peak of number 30).

In May 2015, it was announced that "Riptide" had become the longest-charting song in ARIA Chart history, having remained in the top 100 for 107 weeks and counting. It surpassed the previous record of 106 weeks, held by "Poker Face" by Lady Gaga. In January 2016, the week count was at 120.

As of January 2018, the single has worldwide sales over 6,000,000. That month, as part of Triple M's "Ozzest 100", the 'most Australian' songs of all time, "Riptide" was ranked number 94. In 2025, the song placed 48 in the Triple J Hottest 100 of Australian Songs.

== Description ==
The song's first few chords and opening two lines were originally written at Joy's Glen Iris, Melbourne, home in 2008—the same song title was used, but he initially shelved the song. Years after his experience in university and a VFL career, Joy started doing open mic gigs in Melbourne, Australia, which eventually led to a legitimate music career.

When recording the song in 2012, a year before the EP came out, Joy was writing a song that reminded him of the shelved "Riptide" draft from 2008—he then combined the 2008 effort with his current project at the time. A rough version of the song was uploaded on his personal Facebook account. Although the singer uploaded "...just the first verse and chorus," the encouraging response from Joy's friends and family encouraged him to persist with his music. Joy initially recorded and produced the song with drummer Edwin White in just one afternoon at Red Door Studios, in the Melbourne suburb of Brunswick. Additional production was subsequently completed by John Castle. In an interview, Joy said the title of the song came from a motel of the same name he used to go to with his family when he was a child.

"Riptide" is an indie folk, folk-pop, twee pop, and indie pop song. Musically, the sheet music for the song shows that it is in the key of D♭ major with a tempo of 100 beats per minute. Hannah Gilchrist of the Red Magazine says "...it feels like you should be sitting on a California beach drinking a bottle of beer while your friends frolic in the waves – no surprise it's inspired by the tracks of the 70s."

"Riptide" made its first chart appearance at 75 on the ARIA Singles Chart on 29 April 2013, later making its top 50 debut at 41 on 23 June. The song became a top 10 hit when charting at 10 on 28 July, peaking at number 7. For the remainder of the year, "Riptide" remained at the top 40 until on 2 February 2014, the song charted to a new peak of 6 from 35 in response to the song placed on the top of the Hottest 100 of 2013. The song holds the record for the most weeks in the top 100 of the ARIA Singles Chart (120 consecutive weeks), breaking the records previously held by Lady Gaga's "Poker Face" (106 weeks). Worldwide, the single has sold over 1 million copies.

A music video to accompany the release of "Riptide" was first released onto YouTube on 2 April 2013, at a total length of three minutes and twenty-five seconds. The video, directed by Dimitri Basil and co-directed by Laura Gorun, artistically depicts the song word for word. It was nominated for Best Video at the ARIA Music Awards of 2013. Vance Joy performed "Riptide" at the ARIA Music Awards of 2013 in Star Event Centre. Quentin Alexander performed "Riptide" on the season 14 finale of American Idol on 13 May 2015.

The song has had enduring success in the charts and on digital platforms with over two billion plays on Spotify alone (at December 2023), being the most played Australian song of 2023. A representative for Vance Joy described the song's ongoing popularity having no particular catalyst and said "while the song is up 46 per cent compared to last year, they stress that there is no one TikTok video, pop culture moment or playlist responsible for the song gaining considerable momentum. Instead, the song has become ubiquitous across platforms over the last decade."

=== Tour ===
Riptide Tour
- Tour by Vance Joy
- Location: Oceania; North America; Europe
- Associated album: God Loves You When You're Dancing
- Start date: 14 August 2013
- End date: 26 October 2013
- Legs: 3
- No. of shows: 24

Vance Joy concert chronology
- God Loves You When You're Dancing Tour (2013); Riptide Tour (2013); Dream Your Life Away Tour (2014-15)

On 17 June 2013, Joy announced the Riptide Tour, his second as a solo artist. Before that, Joy was the opening act, between May and June, for the American singer Lissie's tour of the United States, on 27 July he appeared at the Splendour in the Grass in New South Wales and on 7 August he presented at the Edmonton Folk Music Festival in Canada. The tour began on 14 August 2013 in Adelaide, Australia at the Jive Bar and continued until 26 October 2013 in Paris, France. The following month and due to demand, Joy added more dates to his tour. During this period, he also opened for the Australian singer Bernard Fanning's Departures Tour on some dates and opened for Tom Odell on some dates during his tour in the United States.

=== Covers ===
- Taylor Swift performed a piano-based version of the song on BBC Radio 1's Live Lounge segment on 9 October 2014. That version of the song consists of a piano, electric organ, shaker, and acoustic guitar.
- Stealth performed a cover of the song to be used in promotional content for the Disney+ series Percy Jackson and the Olympians in 2023, likely in reference to the sword used by the series' protagonist, which shares its name with the song.

== Track listings ==
Digital download

1. "Riptide" – 3:24
2. "From Afar" – 4:24

Digital download (remix)

1. "Riptide" (FlicFlac Remix) – 5:39

Germany CD single

1. "Riptide" – 3:24
2. "Emmylou" – 4:40
3. "Snaggletooth" – 5:19
4. "From Afar" – 4:24
5. "Riptide" (FlicFlac Edit) – 5:39

United Kingdom digital download EP

1. "Riptide" – 3:24
2. "Play with Fire" – 4:23
3. "Snaggletooth" – 5:19
4. "Emmylou" – 4:40
5. "From Afar" – 4:24

== Charts ==
=== Weekly charts ===
Chart (2013–2017)	Peak position
Australia (ARIA)	6
Austria (Ö3 Austria Top 40)	4
Austria Airplay (MusicTrace)	3
Belgium (Ultratip Bubbling Under Flanders)	6
Belgium Dance (Ultratop Flanders)	19
Belgium (Ultratip Bubbling Under Wallonia)	4
Belgium Dance (Ultratop Wallonia)	27
Canada Hot 100 (Billboard)	13
Canada AC (Billboard)	30
Canada CHR/Top 40 (Billboard)	39
Canada Hot AC (Billboard)	29
Canada Rock (Billboard)	10
Croatia International Airplay (Top lista)	12
Czech Republic Airplay (ČNS IFPI)	4
Czech Republic Singles Digital (ČNS IFPI)	9
Euro Digital Song Sales (Billboard)	19
Europe Digital Tracks (Billboard)	16
Finland (Suomen virallinen lista)	53
France (SNEP)	65
Germany (GfK)	9
Hungary (Stream Top 40)	17
Ireland (IRMA)	7
Israel International Airplay (Media Forest)	2
Mexico Ingles Airplay (Billboard)	30
Netherlands (Dutch Top 40)	25
Netherlands (Single Top 100)	50
Norway (VG-lista)	37
Poland Airplay (ZPAV)	3
Scottish Singles Sales (Official Charts)	8
Slovakia Airplay (ČNS IFPI)	2
Slovakia Singles Digital (ČNS IFPI)	8
Slovenia (SloTop50)	7
Spain (Promusicae)	58
Sweden (Sverigetopplistan)	18
Switzerland (Schweizer Hitparade)	17
UK Singles (Official Charts)	10
UK Independent (Official Charts)	1
US Billboard Hot 100	30
US Adult Contemporary (Billboard)	16
US Adult Pop Airplay (Billboard)	7
US Alternative Airplay (Billboard)	1
US Hot Rock & Alternative Songs (Billboard)	2
US Pop Airplay (Billboard)	18
US Rock & Alternative Airplay (Billboard)	1
Chart (2022–2026)	Peak position
Austria Airplay (MusicTrace)	43
Global 200 (Billboard)	53
Israel (Mako Hitlist)	62
Latvia Streaming (LaIPA)	15
Netherlands (Single Top 100)	36
Poland (Polish Streaming Top 100)	69
Portugal (AFP)	55
Switzerland (Schweizer Hitparade)	16

Weekly chart performance for "Riptide" (Sigala and Jaxomy featuring Ilan Kidron Version)
Chart (2025–2026)	Peak position
Belarus Airplay (TopHit)	123
Czech Republic Airplay (ČNS IFPI)	8
Estonia Airplay (TopHit)	2
Hungary (Dance Top 40)	19
Hungary (Rádiós Top 40)	1
Kazakhstan Airplay (TopHit)	127
Latvia Airplay (TopHit)	2
Lithuania Airplay (TopHit)	48
North Macedonia Airplay (Radiomonitor)	14
Romania Airplay (TopHit)	127
Ukraine Airplay (TopHit)	119

=== Monthly charts ===
Monthly chart performance for "Riptide" (Sigala and Jaxomy featuring Ilan Kidron Version)
Chart (2025)	Peak position
Estonia Airplay (TopHit)	3
Latvia Airplay (TopHit)	3

=== Year-end charts ===
Chart (2013)	Position
Australia (ARIA)	12

Chart (2014)	Position
Australia (ARIA)	55
Austria (Ö3 Austria Top 40)	26
Canada (Canadian Hot 100)	69
France (SNEP)	163
Germany (Official German Charts)	27
Ireland (IRMA)	14
Israel International Airplay (Media Forest)	6
Italy (FIMI)	76
Netherlands (Single Top 100)	69
Poland (ZPAV)	36
Slovenia (SloTop50)	19
Sweden (Sverigetopplistan)	26
Switzerland (Schweizer Hitparade)	38
UK Singles (OCC)	42
US Hot Rock Songs (Billboard)	12
US Rock Airplay (Billboard)	7

Chart (2015)	Position
Canada (Canadian Hot 100)	37
Netherlands (Dutch Top 40)	100
US Billboard Hot 100	71
US Adult Contemporary (Billboard)	44
US Adult Top 40 (Billboard)	30
US Hot Rock Songs (Billboard)	8
US Rock Airplay (Billboard)	10

Chart (2017)	Position
France (SNEP)	189

Chart (2021)	Position
UK Singles (OCC)	83

Chart (2022)	Position
Global 200 (Billboard)	116
UK Singles (OCC)	69

Chart (2023)	Position
Australia (ARIA)	52
Austria (Ö3 Austria Top 40)	45
Global 200 (Billboard)	101
Netherlands (Single Top 100)	81
New Zealand (Recorded Music NZ)	28
Switzerland (Schweizer Hitparade)	35
UK Singles (OCC)	40

Chart (2024)	Position
Australia (ARIA)	24
Austria (Ö3 Austria Top 40)	50
France (SNEP)	126
Global 200 (Billboard)	75
Netherlands (Single Top 100)	79
Portugal (AFP)	121
Switzerland (Schweizer Hitparade)	33
UK Singles (OCC)	36

Chart (2025)	Position
Australia (ARIA)	68
Belgium (Ultratop 50 Flanders)	124
Belgium (Ultratop 50 Wallonia)	162
France (SNEP)	199
Global 200 (Billboard)	67
Netherlands (Single Top 100)	91
Switzerland (Schweizer Hitparade)	32
UK Singles (OCC)	73

Year-end chart performance for "Riptide" (Sigala and Jaxomy featuring Ilan Kidron Version)
Chart (2025)	Peak position
Estonia Airplay (TopHit)	13
Latvia Airplay (TopHit)	37

=== Decade-end charts ===
Chart (2010–2019)	Position
Australia (ARIA)	14
Australian Artist Singles (ARIA)	2
UK Singles (Official Charts Company)	65
US Hot Rock Songs (Billboard)	34

== Certifications ==
Region	Certification	Certified units/sales
Australia (ARIA)	16× Platinum	1,120,000^{‡}
Austria (IFPI Austria)	7× Platinum	210,000^{*}
Belgium (BRMA)	Gold	10,000^{‡}
Canada (Music Canada)	Diamond	800,000^{‡}
Denmark (IFPI Danmark)	2× Platinum	180,000^{‡}
France (SNEP)	Platinum	133,333^{‡}
Germany (BVMI)	Diamond	1,000,000^{‡}
Italy (FIMI)	4× Platinum	400,000^{‡}
New Zealand (RMNZ)	12× Platinum	360,000^{‡}
Portugal (AFP)	5× Platinum	50,000^{‡}
Spain (Promusicae)	4× Platinum	240,000^{‡}
Sweden (GLF)	Platinum	40,000^{‡}
Switzerland (IFPI Switzerland)	Gold	15,000^{^}
United Kingdom (BPI)	8× Platinum	4,800,000^{‡}
United States (RIAA)	Diamond	10,000,000^{‡}
Streaming
Denmark (IFPI Danmark)	Gold	1,300,000^{†}
Greece (IFPI Greece)	3× Platinum	6,000,000^{†}
^{*} Sales figures based on certification alone.^{^} Shipments figures based on certification alone.^{‡} Sales+streaming figures based on certification alone.^{†} Streaming-only figures based on certification alone.

== Release history ==
Region	Date	Format	Label
United States	21 May 2013	Digital download	Atlantic Records
United States	7 October 2013	Adult album alternative radio	Atlantic Records
United Kingdom	25 November 2013	Digital download	Infectious Music
United States	28 January 2014	Digital download (free download)	Atlantic Records
United Kingdom	10 March 2014	Digital download (FlicFlac remix)	Atlantic Records
Germany	28 March 2014	Compact disc	Atlantic Records
United States	1 April 2014	Modern rock radio	Atlantic Records
United States	11 August 2014	Hot adult contemporary radio	Atlantic Records
United States	30 September 2014	Contemporary hit radio	Atlantic Records

== See also ==
- List of Australian chart achievements and milestones
- List of best-selling singles in Australia
- List of songs which have spent the most weeks on the UK Singles Chart
