= Mess Is Mine =

Single by Vance Joy

from the album Dream Your Life Away
- Released: 9 July 2014
- Recorded: 2013
- Genre: Indie pop; indie folk
- Length: 3:43
- Label: Liberation Music (Australia and New Zealand); Atlantic Records (United States); Warner Music (International)
- Songwriter: Vance Joy

Vance Joy singles chronology
"Riptide" (2013)	"Mess Is Mine" (2014)	"First Time" (2014)

Music video
- "Mess Is Mine" on YouTube

"Mess Is Mine" is a song by Australian singer-songwriter Vance Joy, released on 9 July 2014 as the lead single from his debut studio album Dream Your Life Away (2014). The song peaked at number 37 on the Australian national singles chart.

== Music video ==
A music video to accompany the release of "Mess Is Mine" was first released onto YouTube on 9 July 2014 at a total length of three minutes and fifty-four seconds and was directed by Luci Schroder.

== Popular culture ==
"Mess is Mine" features in the soundtrack of the popular video game by EA Sports, FIFA 15 as final track in game soundtrack's album. It was also featured in fourth season of the American television show Hart of Dixie, the first episode of the Netflix original series 13 Reasons Why, and in the trailer for the 2017 film The Big Sick and 2018 Netflix original film Sierra Burgess is a Loser. Vance has also publicly said the song and many others on this album were written about Amber Morris, a girl he met while touring in Texas.

The song was also used on a Delta TV ad in 2015.

== Track listing ==
Digital download
No.	Title	Length
1.	"Mess Is Mine"	3:43

== Charts ==
=== Weekly charts ===
Chart (2014–15)	Peak position
Australia (ARIA)	33
Canada Rock (Billboard)	7
Ireland (IRMA)	91
Sweden (Sverigetopplistan)	95
US Adult Pop Airplay (Billboard)	40
US Hot Rock & Alternative Songs (Billboard)	17
US Rock & Alternative Airplay (Billboard)	8

=== Year-end charts ===
Chart (2015)	Position
US Hot Rock Songs (Billboard)	55
US Rock Airplay (Billboard)	24

== Certifications ==
Region	Certification	Certified units/sales
Australia (ARIA)	4× Platinum	280,000^{‡}
Brazil (Pro-Música Brasil)	Gold	30,000^{‡}
Canada (Music Canada)	4× Platinum	320,000^{‡}
Italy (FIMI)	Gold	25,000^{‡}
New Zealand (RMNZ)	2× Platinum	60,000^{‡}
United Kingdom (BPI)	Gold	400,000^{‡}
United States (RIAA)	2× Platinum	2,000,000^{‡}
^{‡} Sales+streaming figures based on certification alone.

== Release history ==
Region	Date	Format	Label
Australia	9 July 2014	Digital download	Liberation Music
United States	12 January 2015	Adult album alternative radio	F-Stop; Atlantic Records
United States	13 January 2015	Modern rock radio	F-Stop; Atlantic Records
