= Likable (song) =

Single by Toshinori Yonekura

from the album Samurai Quality
- A-side: "Likable"
- B-side: "Faith, Natural Thang, Michi ~Walk With You~"
- Released: August 29, 2007
- Genre: R&B
- Length: 30:38
- Label: Warner Music Group
- Songwriter: Toshinori Yonekura
- Producer: Toshinori Yonekura

Toshinori Yonekura singles chronology
"Whatsoever" (2006)	"Likable" (2007)	"Hands" (2008)

"Likable" is Toshinori Yonekura's 29th single. Released as a limited print CD single coupled with a DVD, it is Yonekura's final single released under Warner Music Group. It is the lead single to his album, Samurai Quality (2007).

== Overview ==
In 2007, Yonekura celebrated his 15th anniversary since his debut in 1992 with a special concert tour, album and the single, "Likable." Aside from the lead track, the single featured three "self-covers" as b-sides all of which were written for and released by other artist. "Faith" was originally recorded by the rock idol group, TOKIO, who released the song on their 2003 album, Glider. "Natural Thang" a Latin influenced pop song was originally recorded by KinKi Kids and was released on the duo's C Album (1999). A live rendition of "Michi ~Walk With You~" is the final original track on the single. It was originally recorded by Takashi Utsunomiya who released the song as a single in 2003 as well. A studio recording by Yonekura himself appears on the album, Samurai Quality (2007).

The DVD content contains two exclusive performances cut from the DVD release of his concert tour for his last album, Fall Back (2006).

== Track list ==
=== CD ===
#	Title	Composition	Arrangement	Time
1.	"Likable"	Toshinori Yonekura	Yoichiro Kakizaki	6:38
2.	"Faith"	Toshinori Yonekura	Takahiro Kaneko	6:30
3.	"Natural Thang"	Toshinori Yonekura	Yamahiro	4:51
4.	"Michi ~Walk With You~ (Live Rendition from 2007)"	Toshinori Yonekura	Shingo Sato	6:07
5.	"Likable (Instrumental)"	Toshinori Yonekura	Yoichiro Kakizaki	6:36

=== DVD ===
#	Title
1.	"Yes, I do. (live rendition from 2006)"
2.	"Jounetsu Shakunetsu (live rendition from 2006)"

== Charts ==
Album - Oricon Sales Chart (Japan)

Release	Chart	Peak Position	First Week	Sales Total	Chart Run
August 29, 2007	Oricon Weekly Singles Chart	39	3,484		3 weeks
