= Fire (Peking Duk song) =

- Remixes

Single by Peking Duk

from the album Reprisal
- Released: 11 May 2018
- Length: 3:46
- Label: Sony Music Australia
- Songwriters: Sam Littlemore; Adam Hyde; Reuben Styles; Sarah Aarons
- Producers: Sam Littlemore; Peking Duk

Peking Duk singles chronology
"Wasted" (2018)	"Fire" (2018)	"Sugar" (2019)

"Fire" is a song by Australian electronic music duo Peking Duk featuring uncredited vocals from Melbourne songwriter Sarah Aarons. It was released to radio on 11 May 2018. Sales of "Fire" counted towards the Reprisal EP's chart placement.

At the ARIA Music Awards of 2018, the song received four nominations; Best Group, Dance Release, Song of the Year and Best Video.

== Track listing ==
Original version
No.	Title	Length
1.	"Fire"	3:46

Remixes
No.	Title	Length
1.	"Fire" (Sak Noel remix)	3:27
2.	"Fire" (Alphalove remix)	3:01
3.	"Fire" (Blinkie remix)	3:11
4.	"Fire" (Feenixpawl remix)	4:03
5.	"Fire" (Se7en Elephants remix)	3:56
6.	"Fire" (Two Can remix)	3:15
7.	"Fire" (Blanke remix)	3:36

== Charts ==
Chart (2018)	Peak position
Australian Club Tracks (ARIA)	24

== Certifications ==
Region	Certification	Certified units/sales
New Zealand (RMNZ)	Platinum	30,000^{‡}
^{‡} Sales+streaming figures based on certification alone.

== Release history ==
Region	Date	Format	Label	Version
Australia	11 May 2018	Streaming; digital download; radio	Sony Music Australia	Original
Australia	13 July 2018	Streaming; digital download	Sony Music Australia	Remixes
