= Wasted (Peking Duk song) =

Single by Peking Duk
- Released: 2 February 2018
- Length: 3:02
- Label: Sony Music Australia
- Songwriters: Kaelyn Behr; Adam Hyde
- Producer: Peking Duk

Peking Duk singles chronology
"Let You Down" (2017)	"Wasted" (2018)	"Fire" (2018)

"Wasted" is a song by Australian electronic music duo Peking Duk. The song was released on 2 February 2018 and has peaked at number 66 on the Australian ARIA Singles Chart.

Peking Duk's Adam Hyne said: "We wrote this song around 3am in London town after drinking for quite some time. It started with the chords then Reubs laid down a bassline and we started riffing out on lyrics and vocal melodies. We couldn't help but sing out the vocal ideas in a hilarious 80s voice that made us scream laugh every time we'd throw an idea out there over the loud skeleton of a beat in the background. So then I yelled out the lyrics we had written and it sounded raw but really fun and genuine, which sums up this song. It's not trying to be anything special or grandiose, it's just a fun song and we had so much fun making it."

== Track listing ==
Digital download
No.	Title	Length
1.	"Wasted"	3:02

== Charts ==
Chart (2018)	Peak position
Australia (ARIA)	66

== Certifications ==
Region	Certification	Certified units/sales
Australia (ARIA)	Platinum	70,000^{‡}
New Zealand (RMNZ)	Gold	15,000^{‡}
^{‡} Sales+streaming figures based on certification alone.
