= GYROstream =

Australian digital music distribution platform

- Established: 2018
- Headquarters: Brisbane, Queensland, Australia
- Services: Digital music distribution Artist services
- Website: www.gyrostream.com

GYROstream is an Australian digital music distribution platform founded in 2018 in Brisbane, Queensland. Its headquarters are located in Australia, with offices in the United States, the United Kingdom, Brazil, the Philippines, and India.

Among the artists distributed by GYROstream are Lithe, Polish Club, Emma Memma, Odette, JK-47, Tom Cardy and others. In 2021, GYROstream won the "Music Distributor of the Year" award from The Music Network and its artists have been nominated for Grammy Awards.

== History ==
In 2018 GYROstream (an acronym for 'Get Your Record Out') was founded by Andy Irvine (CEO), Vivienne Mellish (CMO), Andrew Wilson (Director) and Alex Wilson (Director). It was created to distribute music for independent artists on digital streaming platforms (DSPs) such as Spotify, Apple Music, Amazon Music, YouTube Music, Deezer, TIDAL, and social media platforms Meta and TikTok, as well as to collect and distribute royalties from these platforms.

In 2021, the DistroDirect platform was launched as a subsidiary of GYROstream. That same year, GYROstream received the Tinnie award in the "Music Distributor of the Year" category from The Music Network.

In 2022, the Find My ISRC service was launched, and the GYROrecords label was established.

In 2024, GYROstream launched their North-American artist services division, GROUP SPEED, managed by Adrian Burke.

GYROstream distributes music for artists mainly from Australia and New Zealand, including Lithe, Polish Club, Emma Memma, Odette, JK-47, and Tom Cardy, who have won Australian Recording Industry Association Music Awards (ARIA), Australian Independent Record Awards (AIR), The J Awards, and been nominated for Grammys.

As of 2024, GYROstream operates in seven countries.

In July 2026, GYROstream was acquired by US music distribution platform Too Lost.

== List of artists, awards and nominations ==
=== AIR Awards ===
The Australian Independent Record Awards (commonly known informally as AIR Awards) is an annual awards night to recognise, promote and celebrate the success of Australia's Independent Music sector.

Year	Nominee / work	Award	Result	Ref.
2025	GYROstream for Lithe "Fall Back"	Independent Marketing Team of the Year	Nominated	

=== The Music Network Awards ===
Year	Recipient	Award	Result	Ref.
2021	GYROstream	Music Distributor of the Year	Won	

== See also ==
- Music of Australia
