= Paradise (Peking Duk album) =

Studio album by Peking Duk
- Released: 14 August 2026
- Length: 38:19
- Label: Virgin
- Producers: Peking Duk; Styalz Fuego

Peking Duk chronology
Reprisal (2018)	Paradise (2026)

Singles from Paradise
- 1. "Thrills" Released: 27 March 2026; 2. "Forever" Released: 8 May 2026; 3. "Do Your Best" Released: 12 June 2026; 4. "Let Go" Released: 10 July 2026; 5. "Can't Fit In" Released: 7 August 2026

Paradise is the debut studio album by the Australian electronic duo Peking Duk, released on 14 August 2026. It was preceded by the release of five singles: "Thrills", "Forever", "Do Your Best", "Let Go" and "Can't Fit In".

The album was announced in March 2026 alongside the album's lead single, with the duo taking to social media to say: "After 16 amazing years, Adam and I have made the difficult decision to end this chapter of our lives. We have cherished every moment of this journey with you. Every sweaty club show and every festival we've headlined has truly been a dream come true. But deep down we know it's time for us to evolve. So we finally made a move we thought we'd never make. We recorded an album."

== Reception ==
AAA Backstage called it "a 14-track collision of festival-sized heaters, unexpected collaborations and distinctly Australian storytelling" noting "the record pulls from the duo's sprawling influences, spanning dirty electro, house, hip-hop, rock and pop."

Jules LeFevre from The Age said "The album loosely wraps around the concept of a pirate ship sailing into paradise – where paradise is an empty metaverse of being famous, being seen. Its best tracks, like 'Forever' with Phantogram and 'Let Go' with Matt Corby, take on this dreamy, somewhat melancholy air."

== Track listing ==
All music is composed by Adam Hyde, Reuben Styles, and Kaelyn Behr, except "Jack Thompson" (composed by Behr).

Paradise track listing
No.	Title	Lyrics	Length
1.	"Jack Thompson"	Adam Hyde; Reuben Styles; Kaelyn Behr	2:17
2.	"Let Go" (featuring Matt Corby)	Hyde; Styles; Behr; Matt Corby; Lamont Dozier; Natalie Dunn; Brian Holland; Johnny "Guitar" Watson	3:18
3.	"Spicy Margarita" (featuring FEYI and Poe Leos)	Hyde; Styles; Behr; Damir Košpić; Poe Leos; Olufeyikemi Osuntokun; Mladen Puljiz; Slavko Remenarić	2:54
4.	"Forget Your Life" (featuring Nate Husser)	Hyde; Styles; Behr; Wilbert Hart; Nate Husser; Shungudzo Kuyimba; Connie Mitchell; C Spurling	3:03
5.	"Forever" (featuring Phantogram)	Hyde; Styles; Behr; Sarah Barthel; Kat Ostenberg	3:31
6.	"Do Your Best" (featuring Kah-Lo)	Hyde; Styles; Behr; Faridah Demola Serik	2:34
7.	"Make U Feel"	Hyde; Styles; Behr; Nesbitt Wesonga Jr.	2:24
8.	"Paradise"	Hyde; Styles; Behr; Corby; Dunn	3:14
9.	"Parramatta"	Hyde; Styles; Behr	1:08
10.	"Thrills" (featuring Rico Nasty)	Hyde; Styles; Behr; David J. Cicero; Brittany Barber; Simon Jonasson; Maria Kelly; Kuyimba; Isabella Sjöstrand	3:06
11.	"About You" (featuring Royal & the Serpent)	Hyde; Styles; Behr; Kuyimba; Royal & the Serpent	2:50
12.	"Can't Fit In" (featuring Killer Mike, Nate Husser, and Kingstarlight)	Hyde; Styles; Behr; Hamid Al Shaeri; Julian Bell; Husser; Magdy Khafaga; Killer Mike; Kuyimba	2:59
13.	"Alone"	Hyde; Styles; Behr; Marc Jonson	2:05
14.	"Famous"	Hyde; Styles; Behr; Kuyimba	2:56
Total length:			38:19

== Personnel ==
Credits are adapted from Tidal.

=== Peking Duk ===
- Adam Hyde – production, vocals on "Do Your Best"
- Reuben Styles – production, vocals on "Do Your Best"

=== Additional contributors ===
- Styalz Fuego – production
- Cam Parkins – mixing
- Matt Colton – mastering
- Jack Thompson – vocals on "Jack Thompson"
- Mary White – vocals on "Jack Thompson"
- Maya K – vocals on "Jack Thompson"
- Matt Corby – vocals on "Let Go"
- FEYI – vocals on "Spicy Margarita"
- Poe Leos – vocals on "Spicy Margarita"
- Nate Husser – vocals on "Forget Your Life" and "Can't Fit In"
- Connie Mitchell – vocals on "Forget Your Life"
- Shungudzo Kuyimba – vocals on "Forget Your Life", "Thrills", and "Famous"
- Kat Ostenberg – vocals on "Forever"
- Sarah Barthel – vocals on "Forever"
- Kah-Lo – vocals on "Do Your Best"
- Nesbitt Wesonga Jr. – vocals on "Make U Feel"
- Poppy Baskcomb – vocals on "Paradise"
- Bee-B – vocals on "Thrills"
- Isabella Sjöstrand – vocals on "Thrills"
- Mariia Kelly – vocals on "Thrills"
- Simon Jonasson – vocals on "Thrills"
- GiGi Zimmer – vocal arrangement on "Thrills"
- Royal & the Serpent – vocals on "About You"
- Killer Mike – vocals on "Can't Fit In"
- Kingstarlight – vocals on "Can't Fit In"

== Charts ==
Chart performance for Paradise
Chart (2026)	Peak position
Australian Albums (ARIA)	6
