= Before I Forget (The Kid Laroi album) =

2026 studio album by the Kid Laroi

Studio album by the Kid Laroi
- Released: 9 January 2026
- Genre: R&B
- Length: 44:35
- Label: Columbia

The Kid Laroi chronology
The First Time (2023)	Before I Forget (2026)

Singles from Before I Forget
- 1. "A Cold Play" Released: 5 September 2025; 2. "A Perfect World" Released: 20 November 2025; 3. "Back When You Were Mine" Released: 2 January 2026

Singles from Before I Forget (Deluxe)
- 1. "I Condemn" Released: 17 April 2026; 2. "Pieces" Released: 1 May 2026

Before I Forget (stylised in all-caps) is the second studio album by Australian singer and rapper the Kid Laroi. The album follows his 2023 release The First Time. It was released on 9 January 2026 through Columbia Records. The album contains guest appearances from Andrew Aged, Clara La San, and Lithe. The album's production was handled by Dopamine, Andrew Aged, Vegyn, Jack Karaszewski, FnZ, Auz, Khaled Rohaim, Daniel Aged, Omer Fedi, KBeazy, Nick Weiss, Devin Workman, Zack Sekoff, Eddie Benjamin, and Matt Cenere.

== Background and release ==
In October 2024, the Kid Laroi performed at the NRL Grand Final where he wore a jacket which read "Watch This!" with fans attributing it the name of a release and the launch of a website, thewholeworldswatching.life. To accompany the website and build further hype, the single "Aperol Spritz" was released on 11 October 2024.

In 2025, Laroi released "All I Want Is You", "How Does It Feel?", "Hot Girl Problems" and "She Don't Need to Know" before going on a hiatus and simultaneously teasing the acronym "B.I.F," leading fans to believe the Watch This! album had been scrapped. To replace it, Laroi recorded Before I Forget, an album largely driven by his July 2025 breakup with girlfriend Tate McRae. The official lead single "A Cold Play" was released on 5 September 2025. The album was officially announced on 20 November 2025, along with the release of "A Perfect World". Following the release of Before I Forget, Laroi addressed the album change stating, "I didn't feel comfortable releasing [Watch This!]."

Physical copies of the album list "The Moment" as the intro to the project, swapping places with "Me + You".

== Reception ==
Professional ratings
Aggregate scores
Source	Rating
Metacritic	68/100
Review scores
Source	Rating
AllMusic	4/5 stars
Beats Per Minute	70%
Clash	7/10
Rolling Stone	2.5/5 stars

According to the review aggregator Metacritic, Before I Forget received "generally favorable reviews" based on a weighted average score of 68 out of 100 from four critic scores.

Robin Murray from Clash said "The record as a whole deals with something darker, deeper – self-doubt, loss, and relationship issues" adding "Before I Forget is a record where he tries, and succeeds, to figure things out."

Larisha Paul from Rolling Stone said "It's a melancholic record that succinctly captures his emotional turmoil in the present moment, but reveals little about what comes after his tears have dried — not just in love, but in his career. "

Matt Collar from AllMusic said "Only a few years out of his teens, LAROI reveals a growing maturity and surprising pathos on Before I Forget. He brings you into his heartbreak and holds you there."

== Commercial performance ==
In Australia, Before I Forget became Laroi's third top-three entry on the ARIA Albums Chart, debuting at number two while concurrently topping the Australian Artist Albums Chart. The album entered the UK Albums Chart at number 22 as Laroi's third top-40 release. In the United States, Before I Forget debuted at number six on the Billboard 200, earning 41,000 album-equivalent units in its first week and becoming Laroi's second top-10 album on the chart, following F*ck Love.

== Track listing ==
Before I Forget track listing
No.	Title	Writer(s)	Producer(s)	Length
1.	"Me + You"	Charlton Howard; Antonio Zito	Dopamine	2:55
2.	"July"	C. Howard; Andrew Aged; Vegyn	A. Aged; Vegyn	2:40
3.	"Private"	C. Howard; Zack Sekoff; A. Aged; Jack Karaszewski	A. Aged; Karaszewski	2:45
4.	"Come Down"	C. Howard; Sekoff; Michael Mulé; Isaac De Boni; A. Aged; Zito	FnZ; A. Aged; Dopamine	2:23
5.	"Rather Be" (featuring Lithe)	C. Howard; Mulé; De Boni; Khaled Rohaim; Zito; Austin Howard	FnZ; Rohaim; Dopamine; Auz	4:24
6.	"A Perfect World"	Howard; Sekoff; A. Aged; Omer Fedi; Daniel Aged; Karaszewski	A. Aged; Fedi; D. Aged; Karaszewski	3:09
7.	"5:21AM" (with Andrew Aged)	C. Howard; A. Aged	A. Aged	1:40
8.	"A Cold Play"	C. Howard; KBeazy	KBeazy	2:59
9.	"The Moment" (with Clara La San)	C. Howard; Clara La San; A. Aged; Nick Weiss	A. Aged; Weiss	2:57
10.	"Never Came Back"	C. Howard; Billy Walsh; A. Aged; D. Aged; Sekoff; Zito; Devin Workman	A. Aged; D. Aged; Sekoff; Dopamine; Workman; Karaszewski^{[a]}	2:58
11.	"Thank God"	C. Howard; Walsh; Sekoff; Eddie Benjamin; Workman	Sekoff; Benjamin; Workman; Karaszewski^{[a]}	3:38
12.	"I'm So in Love with You"	C. Howard; Walsh; D. Aged; Zito; Workman	Walsh; D. Aged; Dopamine; Workman	3:42
13.	"Maybe I'm Wrong"	C. Howard; Walsh; Fedi	Fedi	3:22
14.	"Her Interlude"	C. Howard; Rohaim; Matt Cenere	Rohaim; Cenere	2:22
15.	"Back When You Were Mine"	C. Howard; D. Aged; Sekoff	D. Aged; Sekoff	2:41
Total length:				44:35

Additional deluxe tracks
No.	Title	Writer(s)	Producer(s)	Length
1.	"Back 2 Love"	C. Howard; A. Aged; Carter Lang; Benjamin; Jonah Abraham	A. Aged; Lang; Benjamin; Abraham	3:35
2.	"Hold Still"	C. Howard; Walsh; Adam Feeney; Workman	Frank Dukes; Workman; John Keek^{[a]}	3:13
3.	"I Condemn"	C. Howard	Outtatown; Star Boy; AM	2:22
4.	"Quit You"	C. Howard; Walsh; Workman; Johan Carlsson	Workman; Carlsson^{[a]}	3:23
5.	"Weakest Feeling"	C. Howard; Abraham; D. Aged	Abraham; D. Aged^{[a]}; A. Aged^{[a]}	2:42
6.	"Pieces"	C. Howard; Walsh; Workman; Abraham	Workman; Abraham	3:25
7.	"Move Your Body"	C. Howard; Walsh; Tariq Sharrieff; Isaiah Tejada; Michael McHenry; Ryan Oswald; Myles Avery; Orion Meshorer; Israel Houghton II	Meshorer; Houghton; Brad Lewis	2:27
8.	"Echoes"	C. Howard; Walsh; James Fauntleroy; Henry Walter	Cirkut; A. Aged; D. Aged	2:19
9.	"Dying on This Hill"	C. Howard; Isak Gidgård	Str8cash; Auz; Duhvincii	2:42
Total length:				26:11

=== Note ===
- ^{^[a]} signifies an additional producer.

== Personnel ==
Credits adapted from Tidal.

- The Kid Laroi – lead vocals
- Sean Phelan – engineering (all tracks), mixing (tracks 1–4, 7, 9–11, 15)
- Antonio Zito – engineering (4), mixing (5)
- Dopamine – engineering (12), mixing (12, 14)
- Ryan Oswald – engineering assistance (1, 4, 5, 12, 13, 15)
- Ciaran De Chaud – engineering assistance (2, 3, 6, 7, 9–11, 13)
- Mate Gere – engineering assistance (5, 12, 13)
- Jack Mello – engineering assistance (6, 13)
- Alex Kaltzeiotis – engineering assistance (11)
- John Armstrong – engineering assistance (15)
- Serban Ghenea – mixing (6, 8)
- Bryce Bordone – mixing (8), mixing assistance (6)
- John Castelli – mixing (13)
- Dale Becker – mastering (except 8)
- Chris Gehringer – mastering (8)
- Adam Burt, Katie Harvey, Kegn Venegas, Noah McCorkle – mastering assistance (except 8)
- Matt Cenere – vocals (1)
- Jack Karaszewski – arrangement (10)

== Charts ==
Chart performance for Before I Forget
Chart (2026)	Peak position
Australian Albums (ARIA)	2
Australian Hip Hop/R&B Albums (ARIA)	1
Austrian Albums (Ö3 Austria)	38
Belgian Albums (Ultratop Flanders)	20
Canadian Albums (Billboard)	11
Danish Albums (Hitlisten)	13
Dutch Albums (Album Top 100)	23
French Albums (SNEP)	196
Irish Albums (Official Charts)	34
New Zealand Albums (RMNZ)	9
Norwegian Albums (IFPI Norge)	19
Portuguese Albums (AFP)	15
Scottish Albums (Official Charts)	33
Swedish Hip-Hop Albums (Sverigetopplistan)	16
Swiss Albums (Schweizer Hitparade)	35
UK Albums (Official Charts)	22
UK R&B Albums (Official Charts)	1
US Billboard 200	6
