= Rather Be (The Kid Laroi song) =

Single by the Kid Laroi featuring Lithe

from the album Before I Forget
- Released: 23 January 2026
- Genre: R&B; trap
- Length: 4:24
- Label: Columbia
- Songwriters: Charlton Howard; Josiah Ramel; Michael Volpe; Isaac De Boni; Austin Howard; Michael Mulé; Khaled Rohaim; Antonio Zito
- Producers: AuzTheKid; Dopamine; FnZ; Khaled Rohaim

The Kid Laroi singles chronology
"Back When You Were Mine" (2026)	"Rather Be" (2026)	"I Condemn" (2026)

Lithe singles chronology
"For What" (2025)	"Rather Be" (2026)

"Rather Be" is a song by Australian rapper and singer the Kid Laroi featuring fellow Australian rapper and singer Lithe, released on 9 January 2026 as the "focus track" from his second studio album Before I Forget. It was added to BBC Radio 1 on 23 January 2026 as the albums fourth single.

== Critical reception ==
In the week of 19 January 2026, The Music staff named it their "Power Pick" of the week, with Power Pick panelist Richard Kingsmill saying "This is a sure-fire hit from the Kid's second album, Before I Forget. It's an open book of a song about his (seemingly) heartfelt regret after the sudden relationship split with Tate McRae last year." Adding, "The r&b hook is killer, the trap beat adds a depth missing for me on "A Cold Play", and the clever tempo shift maintains the song's momentum into Lithe's impressive verse."

== Charts ==
Weekly chart performance for "Rather Be"
Chart (2026)	Peak position
Australia (ARIA)	54
Canada Hot 100 (Billboard)	76
New Zealand Hot Singles (RMNZ)	4
UK Singles (Official Charts)	78
US Billboard Hot 100	77
