= Sang My Thang =

Studio album by Toshinori Yonekura
- Released: August 24, 2005
- Recorded: 2003–2005 at Prime Sound Studio, Mixer's Lab, and On Air Azabu Studio
- Genre: Pop, R&B
- Length: 55:17
- Label: Warner Music Group
- Producer: Toshinori Yonekura

Toshinori Yonekura chronology
Smile Again (2004)	Sang My Thang (2005)	Fall Back (2006)

Sang My Thang is Toshinori Yonekura's 13th original studio album. The album came three years after his last full-length original album, Roots Of Style. All songs appearing on the album are written and composed by Yonekura and the album was executively produced by pop singer and collaborator, Maki Ohguro.

== Track list ==
#	Title	Composition	Arrangement	Time
1.	"Even Though....."	Toshinori Yonekura	Yoichiro Kakizaki	4:45
2.	"What's Going On?"	Toshinori Yonekura	Akio Togashi	4:30
3.	"Jounetsu Shakunetsu"	Toshinori Yonekura	Takahiro Kaneko	5:23
4.	"Mitsumeau Toki no Naka de..... ~So In Love~"	Toshinori Yonekura	Yoichiro Kakizaki	5:21
5.	"Kaze"	Toshinori Yonekura	Yoichiro Kakizaki	4:15
6.	"Come Closer....."	Toshinori Yonekura	Yoichiro Kakizaki	5:26
7.	"No Cheating, No Lie"	Toshinori Yonekura	Yoichiro Kakizaki	5:32
8.	"So Repetitive"	Toshinori Yonekura	Shingo S.	5:09
9.	"Email"	Toshinori Yonekura	Yoichiro Kakizaki	4:48
10.	"Infinity"	Toshinori Yonekura	Shingo Sato	5:25
11.	"Mirai E"	Toshinori Yonekura	Yamahiro	4:48

== Personnel ==
- Toshinori Yonekura - Vocals, background vocals
- Kiyoshi Kamada - Drums
- Kitaro Nakamura - Electric bass
- Yoichiro Kakizaki - Alto guitar, electric guitar
- Takashi Numazawa - Drums
- Hiroshi Sawasa - Electric bass
- Gen Ohgimi - Percussion
- Gen Ittetsu Strings - Strings
- Big Horns Bee - Horns
- Butcher Asano - Electric guitar
- Obawo Nakajima - Percussion
- Futoshi Kobayashi - Trumpet, flugelhorn
- Ray - Double bass
- Koji Orita - Alto sax
- Wakaba Kawai - Trombone
- Shiro Sasaki - Trumpet

== Production ==
- Executive Producer - Maki Oguro
- Producer - Toshinori Yonekura
- Co-Producer - Kiyoshi Yoshihara, Kazunori Ito
- Vocal arrangement - Toshinori Yonkeura
- Programming - Yoichiro Kakizaki, Shingo Sato
- Recording & Mixing - Toy-knock, Yuji Kuraishi
- Mastering - Harb Powers Jr.
- Art Direction - Koh Sasaki
- Styling - Shuhei Yomo, Hiromi Shibata
- Hair & Make-Up - Satoshi Hirata
- Photography - Takayuki Okada
- Body Painting & Illustration - Hidekichi Shigemoto

== Charts ==
Album - Oricon Sales Chart (Japan)

Release	Chart	Peak Position	First Week	Sales Total	Chart Run
August 24, 2005	Oricon Weekly Albums Chart	29	8,401		4 weeks
