= Say My Name (Peking Duk song) =

Single by Peking Duk, featuring Benjamin Joseph

from the EP Songs to Sweat To
- Released: 10 July 2015
- Recorded: 2015
- Genre: Indietronica; indie pop; synthpop
- Length: 3:06
- Label: Vicious Recordings
- Songwriters: Adam Hyde; Reuben Styles; Benjamin Joseph
- Producer: Peking Duk

Peking Duk singles chronology
"Take Me Over" (2014)	"Say My Name" (2015)	"Stranger" (2016)

"Say My Name" is a song by Australian electronic music duo Peking Duk. The song features vocals from Benjamin Joseph. The song is another single from their debut EP, this time the third and final single.

It is the first single from the group to be released in the United States and is taken from their first extended play, Songs to Sweat To, to be released on 31 July 2015.

The song was written after their appearance at Stereosonic Music Festival in Melbourne in December 2014. The group adds; "The song was actually written in a matter of 20 minutes. It sounded rough but all the ideas were there, a wrap-up session in Canberra and some tightening up in Los Angeles later and 'Say My Name' was complete."

"Say My Name" debuted at number 29 on the Australian ARIA Charts.

== Music video ==
The music video was directed by Anthony Chirco and released on 21 September 2015. The clip features Matt McGorry (of Orange Is the New Black and How to Get Away with Murder). The video was the subject of comments from Ariana Grande, who tweeted "oh................... my god" and Ruby Rose, who said "I could watch this all day".

== Review ==
Lindsay Herr of Earmilk said, "While 'Say My Name' is much less electronic influenced than their previous collaboration, it proves a new side of the Peking Duk sound, one that has much more crossover appeal. A little bit of rock, a little bit of pop, and a whole lotta catchy vibes, Peking Duk prove to be force to be reckoned with".

== Track listing ==
Digital download
No.	Title	Length
1.	"Say My Name"	3:06

== Charts ==
=== Weekly charts ===
Chart (2015)	Peak position
Australia (ARIA)	29

== Certifications ==
Region	Certification	Certified units/sales
Australia (ARIA)	Platinum	70,000^{‡}
New Zealand (RMNZ)	Gold	15,000^{‡}
^{‡} Sales+streaming figures based on certification alone.
