= ARIA Award for Single of the Year =

Award at the annual ARIA Music Awards

ARIA Award for Single of the Year/Song of the Year
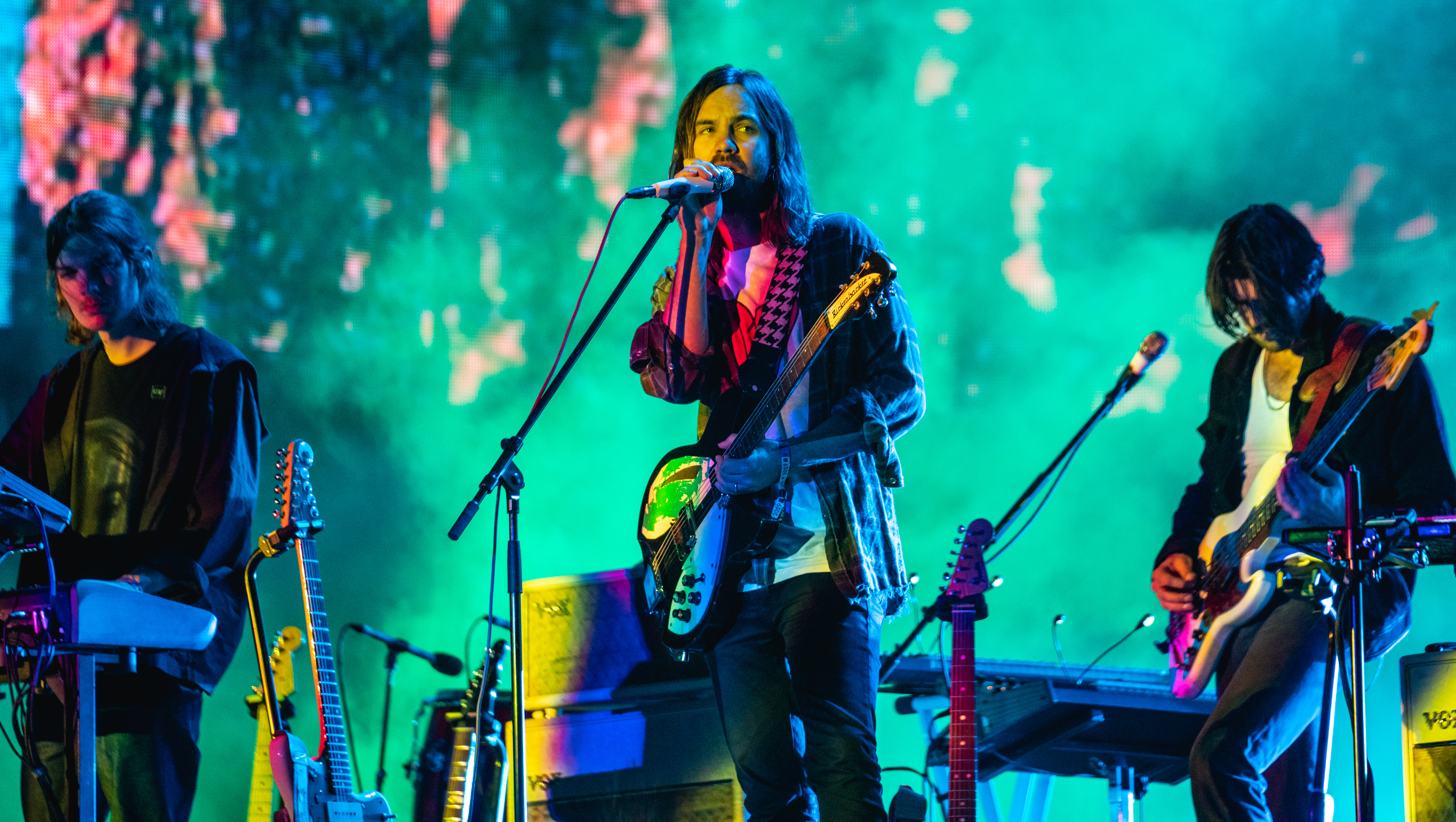
- 2026 winner Tame Impala
- Country: Australia
- Presented by: Australian Recording Industry Association (ARIA)
- First award: 1987
- Currently held by: Tame Impala, "Dracula" (2026)

Highlights
- Most wins: 5 Seconds of Summer (3)
- Most nominations: Dean Lewis (Note: In November 2025, Dean Lewis and his management requested to have his nomination for the 2025 ARIA Award for Song of the Year withdrawn following allegations of inappropriate behaviour by Lewis in October 2025. ARIA actioned this request.) and Powderfinger (7 each)
- Website: ariaawards.com.au

The ARIA Music Award for Single of the Year/Song of the Year, is an award presented at the annual ARIA Music Awards, which recognises "the many achievements of Aussie artists across all music genres", since 1987. It is handed out by the Australian Recording Industry Association (ARIA), an organisation whose aim is "to advance the interests of the Australian record industry." Initially, the award was given to an Australian group or solo artist who have had a single or an extended play appear in the ARIA Top 100 Singles Chart between the eligibility period, and was voted for by a judging academy, which consists of 1000 members from different areas of the music industry.

From 2012 onwards the winner has instead been determined by the general public. The nominees are chosen based on the top ten highest selling Australian single releases, based on ARIA chart sales statistics, during the eligibility period. The song can be an album track which has subsequently been released as a single. As of 2012, the artist could only receive one nomination in this category, even if they had multiple songs in the ARIA top ten. However, in 2021 Keith Urban was nominated both as a featured artist on "Love Songs Ain't for Us" and a co-lead artist on "One Too Many", while in 2025 Fisher was nominated both as the sole artist on "Stay" and a co-lead artist on "Somebody". The public votes are tallied by ARIA, with the winner announced at the awards ceremony.

5 Seconds of Summer has won the most awards with three ("She Looks So Perfect" in 2014, "Youngblood" in 2018, "Teeth" in 2020). Five artists have won the award twice; Silverchair ("Tomorrow" in 1995, "Straight Lines" in 2007), Kylie Minogue ("Where the Wild Roses Grow" in 1996, "Can't Get You Out of My Head" in 2002), Powderfinger ("The Day You Come" in 1999, "My Happiness" in 2001), Matt Corby ("Brother" in 2012, "Resolution" in 2013) and Troye Sivan (''Youth'' in 2016, ''Rush'' in 2023). Corby is the only artist to win in consecutive years.

Dean Lewis and Powderfinger are tied for the most nominations with seven each, with the former also having the most nominations without a win, though Powderfinger frontman Bernard Fanning was also nominated for his solo single "Watch Over Me" in 2006, bringing his total to eight, while Lewis' 2025 nomination for "With You" was withdrawn by request from his management following allegations of inappropriate behaviour. Gotye and Kimbra are the only artists nominated for two different versions of the same song; the original version of "Somebody That I Used to Know" won in 2011, while a remix by Fisher, Chris Lake and Sante Sansone titled "Somebody" was nominated in 2025.

== Winners and nominees ==
In the following table, the winner is highlighted in a separate colour, and in boldface; the nominees are those that are not highlighted or in boldface.

Winner marked in a separate colour

=== Single of the Year ===
| Year | Winner(s) | Single Title |
|---|---|---|
**1987** (1st)
| **1987** (1st) | **John Farnham** | **"You're the Voice"** |
| **1987** (1st) | Crowded House | "Don't Dream It's Over" |
| **1987** (1st) | Hunters & Collectors | "Say Goodbye" |
| **1987** (1st) | INXS & Jimmy Barnes | "Good Times" |
| **1987** (1st) | Paul Kelly & The Coloured Girls | "Before Too Long" |
| **1988** (2nd) | **Midnight Oil** | **"Beds Are Burning"** |
**1989** (3rd)
| **1989** (3rd) | **The Church** | **"Under the Milky Way"** |
| **1989** (3rd) | 1927 | "That's When I Think of You" |
| **1989** (3rd) | Crowded House | "Better Be Home Soon" |
| **1989** (3rd) | John Farnham | "Age of Reason" |
| **1989** (3rd) | INXS | "Never Tear Us Apart" |
**1990** (4th)
| **1990** (4th) | **Peter Blakeley** | **"Crying in the Chapel"** |
| **1990** (4th) | Hunters & Collectors | "When The River Runs Dry" |
| **1990** (4th) | Ian Moss | "Tucker's Daughter" |
| **1990** (4th) | Max Q | "Way of the World" |
| **1990** (4th) | The Black Sorrows | "Chained to the Wheel" |
**1991** (5th)
| **1991** (5th) | **Absent Friends** | **"I Don't Want to Be with Nobody but You"** |
| **1991** (5th) | Divinyls | "I Touch Myself" |
| **1991** (5th) | John Farnham | "That's Freedom" |
| **1991** (5th) | Hunters and Collectors | "Throw Your Arms Around Me" |
| **1991** (5th) | Midnight Oil | "Blue Sky Mine" |
**1992** (6th)
| **1992** (6th) | **Yothu Yindi** | **"Treaty (Filthy Lucre Remix)"** |
| **1992** (6th) | Baby Animals | "Early Warning" |
| **1992** (6th) | Daryl Braithwaite | "The Horses" |
| **1992** (6th) | Deborah Conway | "It's Only the Beginning" |
| **1992** (6th) | Jimmy Barnes and John Farnham | "When Something Is Wrong with My Baby" |
**1993** (7th)
| **1993** (7th) | **Wendy Matthews** | **"The Day You Went Away"** |
| **1993** (7th) | Baby Animals | "One Word" |
| **1993** (7th) | Crowded House | "Weather with You" |
| **1993** (7th) | Diesel | "Tip of My Tongue" |
| **1993** (7th) | Weddings Parties Anything | "Father's Day" |
**1994** (8th)
| **1994** (8th) | **The Cruel Sea** | **"The Honeymoon Is Over"** |
| **1994** (8th) | The Badloves | "Lost" |
| **1994** (8th) | Crowded House | "Distant Sun" |
| **1994** (8th) | Diesel | "Never Miss Your Water" |
| **1994** (8th) | Jimmy Barnes | "Stone Cold" |
**1995** (9th)
| **1995** (9th) | **Silverchair** | **"Tomorrow"** |
| **1995** (9th) | Tina Arena | "Chains" |
| **1995** (9th) | Max Sharam | "Coma" |
| **1995** (9th) | Merril Bainbridge | "Mouth" |
| **1995** (9th) | Nick Cave & The Bad Seeds | "Do You Love Me?" |
**1996** (10th)
| **1996** (10th) | **Nick Cave & The Bad Seeds** and **Kylie Minogue** | **"Where the Wild Roses Grow"** |
| **1996** (10th) | Ammonia | "Drugs" |
| **1996** (10th) | Powderfinger | "Pick You Up" |
| **1996** (10th) | Tina Arena | "Wasn't It Good" |
| **1996** (10th) | You Am I | "Mr. Milk" |
**1997** (11th)
| **1997** (11th) | **Savage Garden** | **"Truly Madly Deeply"** |
| **1997** (11th) | Nick Cave & the Bad Seeds | "Into My Arms" |
| **1997** (11th) | Leonardo's Bride | "Even When I'm Sleeping" |
| **1997** (11th) | Powderfinger | "D.A.F." |
| **1997** (11th) | Spiderbait | "Buy Me a Pony" |
**1998** (12th)
| **1998** (12th) | **Natalie Imbruglia** | **"Torn"** |
| **1998** (12th) | Kylie Minogue | "Did It Again" |
| **1998** (12th) | The Living End | "Second Solution / Prisoner of Society" |
| **1998** (12th) | The Mavis's | "Cry" |
| **1998** (12th) | The Whitlams | "No Aphrodisiac" |
**1999** (13th)
| **1999** (13th) | **Powderfinger** | **"The Day You Come"** |
| **1999** (13th) | Ben Lee | "Cigarettes Will Kill You" |
| **1999** (13th) | Josh Abrahams | "Addicted to Bass" |
| **1999** (13th) | Silverchair | "Ana's Song (Open Fire)" |
| **1999** (13th) | Regurgitator | "! (The Song Formerly Known As)" |
**2000** (14th)
| **2000** (14th) | **Madison Avenue** | **"Don't Call Me Baby"** |
| **2000** (14th) | 28 Days | "Rip It Up" |
| **2000** (14th) | Kasey Chambers | "The Captain" |
| **2000** (14th) | Killing Heidi | "Mascara" |
| **2000** (14th) | Powderfinger | "Passenger" |
**2001** (15th)
| **2001** (15th) | **Powderfinger** | **"My Happiness"** |
| **2001** (15th) | The Avalanches | "Frontier Psychiatrist" |
| **2001** (15th) | Kylie Minogue | "On a Night Like This" |
| **2001** (15th) | Something for Kate | "Monsters" |
| **2001** (15th) | You Am I | "Damage" |
**2002** (16th)
| **2002** (16th) | **Kylie Minogue** | **"Can't Get You Out of My Head"** |
| **2002** (16th) | Alex Lloyd | "Amazing" |
| **2002** (16th) | Grinspoon | "Chemical Heart" |
| **2002** (16th) | Kasey Chambers | "Not Pretty Enough" |
| **2002** (16th) | The Vines | "Get Free" |
**2003** (17th)
| **2003** (17th) | **Delta Goodrem** | **"Born to Try"** |
| **2003** (17th) | Amiel | "Lovesong" |
| **2003** (17th) | Powderfinger | "(Baby I've Got You) On My Mind" |
| **2003** (17th) | Silverchair | "Luv Your Life" |
| **2003** (17th) | The Waifs | "Lighthouse" |
**2004** (18th)
| **2004** (18th) | **Jet** | **"Are You Gonna Be My Girl"** |
| **2004** (18th) | Missy Higgins | "Scar" |
| **2004** (18th) | Eskimo Joe | "From the Sea" |
| **2004** (18th) | Pete Murray | "So Beautiful" |
| **2004** (18th) | The John Butler Trio | "Zebra" |
**2005** (19th)
| **2005** (19th) | **Ben Lee** | **"Catch My Disease"** |
| **2005** (19th) | Evermore | "For One Day" |
| **2005** (19th) | Missy Higgins | "The Special Two" |
| **2005** (19th) | Thirsty Merc | "Someday, Someday" |
| **2005** (19th) | Wolfmother | "Woman" |
**2006** (20th)
| **2006** (20th) | **Eskimo Joe** | **"Black Fingernails, Red Wine"** |
| **2006** (20th) | Augie March | "One Crowded Hour" |
| **2006** (20th) | Bernard Fanning | "Watch Over Me" |
| **2006** (20th) | Wolfmother | "Mind's Eye" |
| **2006** (20th) | Youth Group | "Forever Young" |
**2007** (21st)
| **2007** (21st) | **Silverchair** | **"Straight Lines"** |
| **2007** (21st) | Architecture In Helsinki | "Heart It Races" |
| **2007** (21st) | The John Butler Trio | "Funky Tonight" |
| **2007** (21st) | Powderfinger | "Lost and Running" |
| **2007** (21st) | Sneaky Sound System | "UFO" |
| **2007** (21st) | Wolfmother | "Joker & the Thief" |
**2008** (22nd)
| **2008** (22nd) | **Gabriella Cilmi** | **"Sweet About Me"** |
| **2008** (22nd) | Faker | "This Heart Attack" |
| **2008** (22nd) | The Presets | "My People" |
| **2008** (22nd) | The Living End | "White Noise" |
| **2008** (22nd) | Sam Sparro | "Black and Gold" |
**2009** (23rd)
| **2009** (23rd) | **Empire of the Sun** | **"Walking on a Dream"** |
| **2009** (23rd) | Hilltop Hoods | "Chase That Feeling" |
| **2009** (23rd) | Kate Miller-Heidke | "The Last Day on Earth" |
| **2009** (23rd) | Ladyhawke | "My Delirium" |
| **2009** (23rd) | The Temper Trap | "Sweet Disposition" |
**2010** (24th)
| **2010** (24th) | **Angus & Julia Stone** | **"Big Jet Plane"** |
| **2010** (24th) | Birds of Tokyo | "Plans" |
| **2010** (24th) | Sia | "Clap Your Hands" |
| **2010** (24th) | The Temper Trap | "Love Lost" |
| **2010** (24th) | Washington | "How to Tame Lions" |
**2011** (25th)
| **2011** (25th) | **Gotye** featuring **Kimbra** | **"Somebody That I Used to Know"** |
| **2011** (25th) | Birds of Tokyo | "Wild at Heart" |
| **2011** (25th) | Boy & Bear | "Feeding Line" |
| **2011** (25th) | Drapht | "Rapunzel" |
| **2011** (25th) | Guy Sebastian featuring Eve | "Who's That Girl" |
| **2011** (25th) | The Jezabels | "Dark Storm" |

=== Song of the Year ===
| Year | Winner(s) | Song title |
|---|---|---|
**2012** (26th)
| **2012** (26th) | **Matt Corby** | **"Brother"** |
| **2012** (26th) | 360 featuring Gossling | "Boys like You" |
| **2012** (26th) | Delta Goodrem | "Sitting on Top of the World" |
| **2012** (26th) | Guy Sebastian | "Don't Worry Be Happy" |
| **2012** (26th) | Hilltop Hoods featuring Sia | "I Love It" |
| **2012** (26th) | Jessica Mauboy featuring Stan Walker | "Galaxy" |
| **2012** (26th) | Justice Crew | "Boom Boom" |
| **2012** (26th) | Reece Mastin | "Good Night" |
| **2012** (26th) | Ricki-Lee | "Do It Like That" |
| **2012** (26th) | Timomatic | "Set It Off" |
**2013** (27th)
| **2013** (27th) | **Matt Corby** | **"Resolution"** |
| **2013** (27th) | Birds of Tokyo | "Lanterns" |
| **2013** (27th) | Bombs Away featuring The Twins | "Party Bass" |
| **2013** (27th) | Flume | "Holdin On" |
| **2013** (27th) | Guy Sebastian | "Get Along" |
| **2013** (27th) | Justice Crew | "Best Night" |
| **2013** (27th) | Samantha Jade | "What You've Done to Me" |
| **2013** (27th) | Stafford Brothers (featuring Lil Wayne & Christina Milian) | "Hello" |
| **2013** (27th) | Timomatic | "Parachute" |
| **2013** (27th) | Vance Joy | "Riptide" |
**2014** (28th)
| **2014** (28th) | **5 Seconds of Summer** | **"She Looks So Perfect"** |
| **2014** (28th) | Guy Sebastian | "Like a Drum" |
| **2014** (28th) | Havana Brown | "Warrior" |
| **2014** (28th) | Iggy Azalea (featuring Charli XCX) | "Fancy" |
| **2014** (28th) | Joel Fletcher (featuring Savage) | "Swing" |
| **2014** (28th) | Justice Crew | "Que Sera" |
| **2014** (28th) | Nathaniel | "You" |
| **2014** (28th) | Sheppard | "Geronimo" |
| **2014** (28th) | Sia | "Chandelier" |
| **2014** (28th) | Taylor Henderson | "Borrow My Heart" |
**2015** (29th)
| **2015** (29th) | **Conrad Sewell** | **"Start Again"** |
| **2015** (29th) | Grace (featuring G-Eazy) | "You Don't Own Me" |
| **2015** (29th) | Iggy Azalea (featuring Jennifer Hudson) | "Trouble" |
| **2015** (29th) | Jarryd James | "Do You Remember" |
| **2015** (29th) | Marlisa | "Stand by You" |
| **2015** (29th) | Nathaniel | "Live Louder" |
| **2015** (29th) | Peking Duk | "Take Me Over" |
| **2015** (29th) | Sia | "Elastic Heart" |
| **2015** (29th) | The Veronicas | "You Ruin Me" |
| **2015** (29th) | Vance Joy | "Georgia" |
**2016** (30th)
| **2016** (30th) | **Troye Sivan** | **"Youth"** |
| **2016** (30th) | Flume | "Never Be Like You" (featuring Kai) |
| **2016** (30th) | Hilltop Hoods | "1955" (featuring Montaigne & Thom Thum) |
| **2016** (30th) | Illy | "Papercuts" (featuring Vera Blue) |
| **2016** (30th) | Kungs vs. Cookin' on 3 Burners | "This Girl" |
| **2016** (30th) | Keith Urban (featuring Carrie Underwood) | "The Fighter" |
| **2016** (30th) | L D R U | "Keeping Score" (feat. Paige IV) |
| **2016** (30th) | Marcus Marr & Chet Faker | "The Trouble with Us" |
| **2016** (30th) | Sia | "Cheap Thrills" |
| **2016** (30th) | The Veronicas | "In My Blood" |
**2017** (31st)
| **2017** (31st) | **Peking Duk** | **"Stranger"** (featuring Elliphant) |
| **2017** (31st) | Amy Shark | "Adore" |
| **2017** (31st) | Bliss n Eso | "Moments" (featuring Gavin James) |
| **2017** (31st) | Dean Lewis | "Waves" |
| **2017** (31st) | Guy Sebastian | "Set in Stone" |
| **2017** (31st) | Illy | "Catch 22" (feat. Anne-Marie) |
| **2017** (31st) | Jessica Mauboy | "Fallin'" |
| **2017** (31st) | Pnau | "Chameleon" |
| **2017** (31st) | Sia | "The Greatest" (featuring Kendrick Lamar) |
| **2017** (31st) | Starley | "Call on Me" (Ryan Riback Remix) |
**2018** (32nd)
| **2018** (32nd) | **5 Seconds of Summer** | **"Youngblood"** |
| **2018** (32nd) | Amy Shark | "I Said Hi" |
| **2018** (32nd) | Angus & Julia Stone | "Chateau" |
| **2018** (32nd) | Conrad Sewell | "Healing Hands" |
| **2018** (32nd) | Dean Lewis | "Be Alright" |
| **2018** (32nd) | Peking Duk | "Fire/Reprisal" |
| **2018** (32nd) | Pnau | "Go Bang" |
| **2018** (32nd) | Sheppard | "Coming Home" |
| **2018** (32nd) | Troye Sivan | "My My My!" |
| **2018** (32nd) | Vance Joy | "Lay It on Me" |
**2019** (33rd)
| **2019** (33rd) | **Guy Sebastian** | **"Choir"** |
| **2019** (33rd) | 5 Seconds of Summer | "Easier" |
| **2019** (33rd) | Amy Shark | "Mess Her Up" |
| **2019** (33rd) | Birds of Tokyo | "Good Lord" |
| **2019** (33rd) | Dean Lewis | "7 Minutes" |
| **2019** (33rd) | Hilltop Hoods | "Leave Me Lonely" |
| **2019** (33rd) | Kian | "Waiting" |
| **2019** (33rd) | Morgan Evans | "Day Drunk" |
| **2019** (33rd) | Ocean Alley | "Confidence" |
| **2019** (33rd) | Tones and I | "Dance Monkey" |
**2020** (34th)
| **2020** (34th) | **5 Seconds of Summer** | **"Teeth"** |
| **2020** (34th) | Flume | "Rushing Back" featuring Vera Blue |
| **2020** (34th) | Hilltop Hoods featuring Illy & Ecca Vandal | "Exit Sign" |
| **2020** (34th) | Lime Cordiale | "Robbery" |
| **2020** (34th) | Mallrat | "Charlie" |
| **2020** (34th) | Ruel | "Painkiller" |
| **2020** (34th) | Sam Fischer | "This City" |
| **2020** (34th) | The Jungle Giants | "Heavy Hearted" |
| **2020** (34th) | The Rubens | "Live in Life" |
| **2020** (34th) | Tones and I | "Never Seen the Rain" |
**2021** (35th)
| **2021** (35th) | **Spacey Jane** | **"Booster Seat"** |
| **2021** (35th) | Amy Shark feat. Keith Urban | "Love Songs Ain't for Us" |
| **2021** (35th) | Dean Lewis | "Falling Up" |
| **2021** (35th) | Hooligan Hefs | "Send It!" |
| **2021** (35th) | Keith Urban & Pink | "One Too Many" |
| **2021** (35th) | Masked Wolf | "Astronaut in the Ocean" |
| **2021** (35th) | Sam Fischer & Demi Lovato | "What Other People Say" |
| **2021** (35th) | The Kid Laroi with Miley Cyrus | "Without You'" |
| **2021** (35th) | Tones and I | "Fly Away" |
| **2021** (35th) | Vance Joy | "Missing Piece" |
**2022** (36th)
| **2022** (36th) | **Tones and I** | **"Cloudy Day"** |
| **2022** (36th) | Clinton Kane | "I Guess I'm in Love" |
| **2022** (36th) | Dean Lewis | "Hurtless" |
| **2022** (36th) | Flume | "Say Nothing" (featuring May-a) |
| **2022** (36th) | Joji | "Glimpse of Us" |
| **2022** (36th) | Jolyon Petch | "Dreams" (featuring Reigan) |
| **2022** (36th) | Luude | "Down Under" (featuring Colin Hay) |
| **2022** (36th) | Rüfüs Du Sol | "On My Knees" |
| **2022** (36th) | The Kid Laroi | "Thousand Miles'" |
| **2022** (36th) | Vance Joy | "Clarity" |
**2023** (37th)
| **2023** (37th) | **Troye Sivan** | **"Rush"** |
| **2023** (37th) | Budjerah | "Therapy" |
| **2023** (37th) | Day1 feat. Kahukx | "Mbappé" |
| **2023** (37th) | Dean Lewis | "How Do I Say Goodbye" |
| **2023** (37th) | Joji | "Die For You" |
| **2023** (37th) | Kylie Minogue | "Padam Padam" |
| **2023** (37th) | Luude and Mattafix | "Big City Life" |
| **2023** (37th) | MK and Dom Dolla | "Rhyme Dust" |
| **2023** (37th) | R3hab and Amy Shark | "Sway My Way" |
| **2023** (37th) | The Kid Laroi | "Love Again" |
**2024** (38th)
| **2024** (38th) | **G Flip** | **"The Worst Person Alive"** |
| **2024** (38th) | Cyril | "Stumblin' In" |
| **2024** (38th) | Dom Dolla | "Saving Up" |
| **2024** (38th) | Fisher featuring Kita Alexander | "Atmosphere" |
| **2024** (38th) | Jessica Mauboy featuring Jason Derulo | "Give You Love" |
| **2024** (38th) | Kylie Minogue | "Tension" |
| **2024** (38th) | Lithe | "Fall Back" |
| **2024** (38th) | Royel Otis | "Murder on the Dance Floor" - triple j Like A Version |
| **2024** (38th) | The Kid Laroi | "Nights Like This" |
| **2024** (38th) | Troye Sivan | "Got Me Started" |
**2025** (39th)
| **2025** (39th) | **The Kid Laroi** | **"Girls"** |
| **2025** (39th) | Cyril and Maryjo | "Still Into You" |
| **2025** (39th) | ~~Dean Lewis~~ | ~~"With You"~~ |
| **2025** (39th) | Dom Dolla featuring Daya | "Dreamin'" |
| **2025** (39th) | Fisher | "Stay" |
| **2025** (39th) | Gotye, Fisher and Chris Lake featuring Kimbra and Sante Sansone | "Somebody" |
| **2025** (39th) | Onefour and Nemzzz | "Spinnin" |
| **2025** (39th) | Royel Otis | "Linger" (SiriusXM Session) |
| **2025** (39th) | Sonny Fodera, Jazzy & D.O.D. | "Somedays" |
| **2025** (39th) | Tobiahs | "Angel of Mine" |
**2026** (40th)
| **2026** (40th) | **Tame Impala** | **"Dracula"** |
| **2026** (40th) | Fisher | "Blackberries" |
| **2026** (40th) | G Flip | "Bed on Fire" |
| **2026** (40th) | Keli Holiday | "Dancing2" |
| **2026** (40th) | Lithe | "Cannonball" |
| **2026** (40th) | Ocean Alley | "Love Balloon" |
| **2026** (40th) | Royel Otis | "Car" |
| **2026** (40th) | Sonny Fodera | "Think About Us" |
| **2026** (40th) | The Kid Laroi | "A Cold Play" |
| **2026** (40th) | Vance Joy | "Divine Feelings" |

== Artists with multiple wins ==
3 wins

- 5 Seconds of Summer

2 wins

- Matt Corby
- Kylie Minogue
- Powderfinger
- Silverchair
- Troye Sivan

== Artists with multiple nominations ==
8 nominations

- Bernard Fanning (Note: Including seven as a member of Powderfinger.)

7 nominations

- Dean Lewis
- Powderfinger

6 nominations

- Vance Joy
- The Kid Laroi
- Kylie Minogue
- Guy Sebastian
- Sia

5 nominations

- Hilltop Hoods
- Amy Shark

4 nominations

- 5 Seconds of Summer
- Birds of Tokyo
- Crowded House
- John Farnham
- Fisher
- Flume
- Adam Hyde (Note: Three as a member of Peking Duk and one as a solo artist under the name Keli Holiday.)
- Silverchair
- Troye Sivan
- Tones and I

3 nominations

- Jimmy Barnes
- Dom Dolla
- Hunters & Collectors
- Illy
- Justice Crew
- Nick Littlemore (Note: One as a member of Empire of the Sun and two as a member of Pnau.)
- Jessica Mauboy
- Nick Cave & the Bad Seeds
- Peking Duk
- Royel Otis
- Keith Urban
- Wolfmother

2 nominations

- Tina Arena
- Iggy Azalea
- Baby Animals
- Kasey Chambers
- Matt Corby
- Cyril
- Diesel
- Delta Goodrem
- Eskimo Joe
- Sam Fischer
- G Flip
- Sonny Fodera
- Gotye
- Missy Higgins
- INXS
- John Butler Trio
- Joji
- Kimbra
- Ben Lee
- Lithe
- The Living End
- Luude
- Midnight Oil
- Nathaniel
- Ocean Alley
- Pnau
- Conrad Sewell
- Sheppard
- Angus & Julia Stone
- The Temper Trap
- Timomatic
- The Veronicas
- You Am I
