= Dancing2 =

2025 single by Keli Holiday

Single by Keli Holiday

from the album Capital Fiction
- Released: 12 August 2025
- Length: 4:32
- Label: Keli Holiday
- Songwriters: Adam Hyde; Alex Cameron; Konstantin Kersting

Keli Holiday singles chronology
| "Online Jesus" (2024) | "Dancing2" (2025) | "Ecstasy" (2026) |

"Dancing2" is a song by Australian musician Keli Holiday, released on 12 August 2025, with the musician saying "This song is about meeting a love that seemed a world away." The song is Keli Holiday's first to enter the ARIA top 100. The track was co-written by singer-songwriter Alex Cameron and producer Konstantin Kersting.

The music video was filmed in Melbourne and directed by Ryan Sauer and released on 28 August 2025. At the 2025 ARIA Music Awards, the video won ARIA Award for Best Video. At the 2026 AACTA Awards, it was nominated for Audience Choice Award for Favourite Australian Music Video.

"Dancing2" was voted in at number 2 on the 2025 Triple J Hottest 100.

At the APRA Music Awards of 2026, the song was nominated for Song of the Year and Most Performed Alternative Work. At the AIR Awards of 2026, it was nominated for Independent Song of the Year. At the 2026 ARIA Music Awards, it was nominated for Song of the Year.

== Critical reception ==
Mary Varvaris from The Music called it "a love song with a pulsing beat and genuine, heart-on-your-sleeve lyrics."

== Charts ==
Weekly chart performance for "Dancing2"
| Chart (2025) | Peak position |
|---|---|
| Australia (ARIA) | 24 |
| New Zealand Hot Singles (RMNZ) | 7 |

Year-end chart performance for " Dancing2"
| Chart (2025) | Position |
|---|---|
| Australian Artist (ARIA) | 37 |
