= Stranger (Peking Duk song) =

Single by Peking Duk featuring Elliphant
- Released: 21 October 2016
- Recorded: 2016
- Length: 3:26
- Label: Sony Music Australia
- Songwriters: Adam Hyde, Reuben Styles, Kaelyn Behr, Elliphant, Daniel Goudie, Ashley Milton

Peking Duk singles chronology
"Say My Name" (2015)	"Stranger" (2016)	"Fake Magic" (2017)

"Stranger" is a song by Australian electronic music duo Peking Duk featuring Swedish singer Elliphant.

The song was written late in 2015 in Sydney while Elliphant was touring for the Falls Festival. The song was redone by the trio several times over the year. Elliphant is grateful the duo ignored her request "to give it to another artist", saying "I told them that maybe there would be a better person to do 'Stranger' because they weren't satisfied, I wasn't coming up with the vocal they wanted. If I heard it out there with some other girl now I would be so annoyed."

At the ARIA Music Awards of 2017, the song was nominated for three awards, winning Song of the Year. At the APRA Music Awards of 2018, the song won Dance Work of the Year.

== Track listing ==
Digital download
No.	Title	Length
1.	"Stranger" (featuring Elliphant)	3:26

== Charts ==
=== Weekly charts ===
Chart (2016–17)	Peak position
Australia (ARIA)	5
New Zealand (Recorded Music NZ)	20

=== Year-end charts ===
Chart (2016)	Position
Australia (ARIA)	93
Chart (2017)	Position
Australia (ARIA)	78

== Certifications ==
Region	Certification	Certified units/sales
Australia (ARIA)	5× Platinum	350,000^{‡}
New Zealand (RMNZ)	2× Platinum	60,000^{‡}
^{‡} Sales+streaming figures based on certification alone.
