= Nicole Millar =

Canadian-Australian electronic, indie pop singer-songwriter

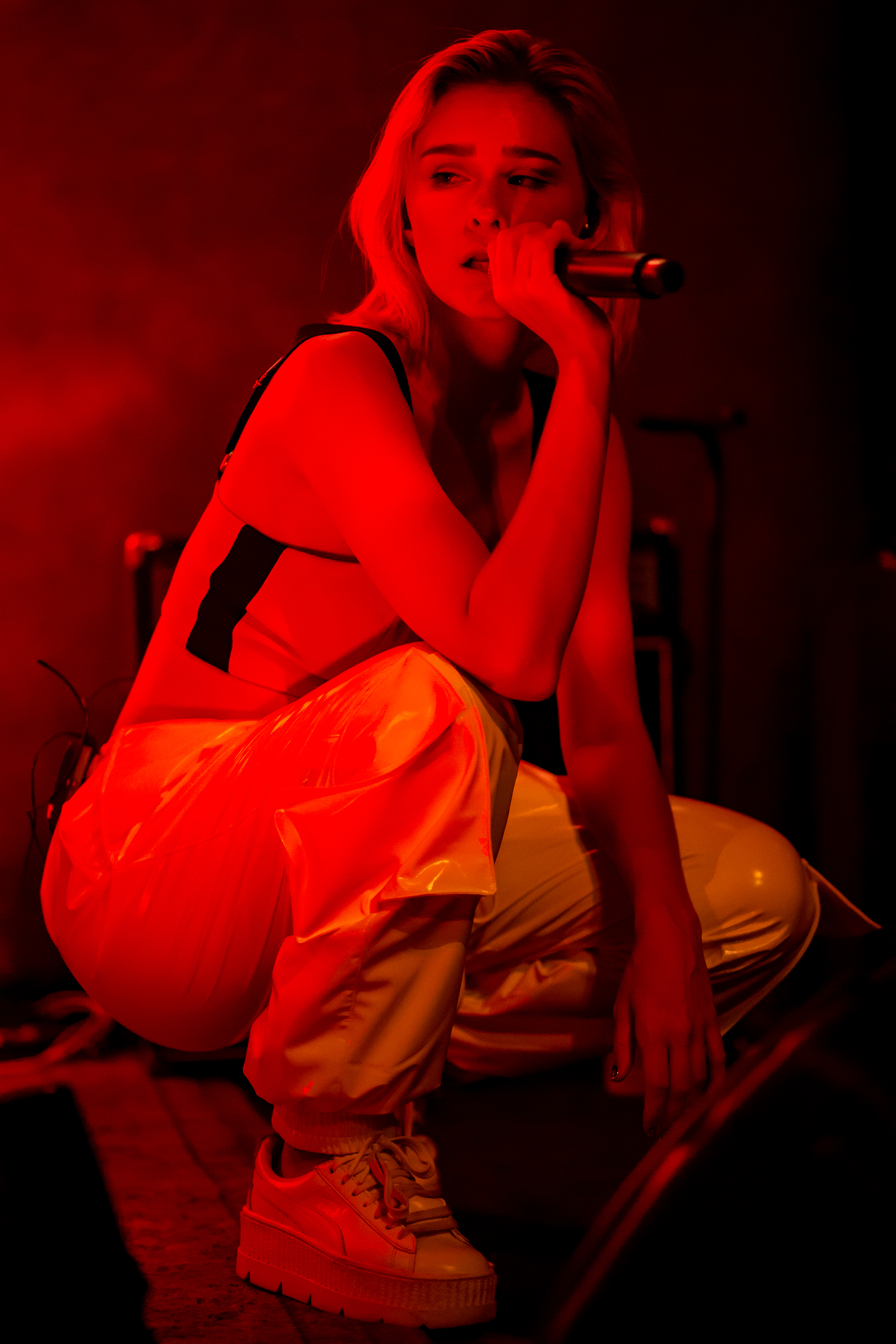
- Millar in 2018

Background information
- Born: Nicole Maxine Michel-Millar; 27 April 1993 (age 33); Canada
- Origin: Sydney, New South Wales, Australia
- Genres: Electronic; indie pop
- Occupation: Musician
- Instrument: Voice
- Years active: 2013–present
- Labels: Universal; EMI
- Website: nicolemillar.com.au

Nicole Maxine Michel-Millar, (born 27 April 1993) who performs as Nicole Millar, is a Canadian-Australian electronic, indie pop singer-songwriter. She is the featured vocalist on "High" (February 2014) by Australian duo, Peking Duk, which peaked at No. 5 on the ARIA Singles Chart and was certified triple platinum by the Australian Recording Industry Association (ARIA). Millar co-wrote the track with Sam Littlemore and the duo's Adam Hyde and Reuben Styles. At the ARIA Music Awards of 2014 she won a trophy for Best Dance Release alongside the group. In the following January, "High", was listed at No.2 on the Triple J Hottest 100, 2014.

Her highest charting solo work is her debut extended play, Tremble (5 February 2016), which peaked at #53 on the ARIA Singles Chart. In November 2017, the EP was certified gold for sales in excess of 35,000 copies. Her debut album, Excuse Me, appeared on 1 June 2018, which peaked at No. 8 on the ARIA Hitseekers Albums Chart. It was recorded over two years with Sable, Dan Faber, Hoodboi, xSDTRK, and Kyle Shearer producing.

Craig Mathieson of The Sydney Morning Herald observed that the singer had completed, "a journey of creative self-discovery that began with her pulling her car over to quickly record ideas on her phone and ended with songwriting sessions in Sweden and studio time in Los Angeles." She undertook a national headlining tour in June 2018. The Partae's reviewer found the album, "charts everything from admitting your faults and owning your shit to wild nights with best friends and the bittersweet parts of love, lust and relationships."

On 6 December 2019, Millar released a new single titled "Favours". On 28 May 2021, Millar released her third EP, Are You Kidding?.

== Discography ==
=== Studio albums ===
| Title | Details |
|---|---|
| Excuse Me | Released: 1 June 2018; Label: EMI Music Australia; Formats: CD, digital download |

=== Extended plays ===
| Title | Details | Peak chart positions |
| Title | Details | AUS |
|---|---|---|
| Tremble | Released: 5 February 2016; Label: Universal Music Australia; Formats: CD, digital download | 53 |
| Communication | Released: 2 December 2016; Label: Universal Music Australia; Formats: CD, digital download | 97 |
| Are You Kidding? | Released: 28 May 2021; Label: Universal Music Australia; Formats: streaming, digital download | — |
| Daydreamin' | Released: 31 March 2023; Label: Nicole Millar; Formats: streaming, digital download | — |

=== Charted singles ===
==== As featured artist ====
| Title | Year | Peak chart positions | Certification | Album |
| Title | Year | AUS | Certification | Album |
|---|---|---|---|---|
| "High" (Peking Duk featuring Nicole Millar) | 2014 | 5 | ARIA: 4× Platinum; RMNZ: 3× Platinum | Songs to Sweat To |

== Awards and nominations ==
=== AIR Awards ===
The Australian Independent Record Awards (commonly known informally as AIR Awards) is an annual awards night to recognise, promote and celebrate the success of Australia's Independent Music sector.

| Year | Category | Nominated artist/work | Result |
|---|---|---|---|
| 2014 | Best Independent Dance/Electronica or Club Single | "High" (Peking Duk featuring Nicole Millar) | Won |

=== APRA Awards ===
Since 1982 the APRA Awards are run by Australian Performing Right Association to recognise songwriting skills, sales and airplay performance by its members annually.

| Year | Category | Nominated artist/work | Result |
|---|---|---|---|
| 2015 | Song of the Year | "High" (Peking Duk featuring Nicole Millar) | Shortlisted |
| 2015 | Dance Work of the Year | "High" (Peking Duk featuring Nicole Millar) | Nominated |

=== ARIA Music Awards ===
The ARIA Music Awards are a set of annual ceremonies presented by Australian Recording Industry Association (ARIA), which recognise excellence, innovation, and achievement across all genres of the music of Australia. They commenced in 1987.

| Year | Category | Nominated artist/work | Result |
|---|---|---|---|
| 2014 | Best Dance Release | "High" (Peking Duk featuring Nicole Millar) | Won |
