= Fake Magic =

Single by Peking Duk & AlunaGeorge
- Released: 2 June 2017
- Length: 2:45
- Label: Sony Music Australia
- Songwriters: Sam Littlemore; George Reid; Aluna Francis; Adam Hyde; Reuben Styles; LJL
- Producer: Peking Duk

Peking Duk singles chronology
"Stranger" (2016)	"Fake Magic" (2017)	"Let You Down" (2017)

AlunaGeorge singles chronology
"Not Above Love" (2017)	"Fake Magic" (2017)	"Last Kiss" (2017)

"Fake Magic" is a song by Australian electronic music duo Peking Duk featuring English musical duo AlunaGeorge. The song was released in June 2017, and peaked at number 34 on the Australian ARIA Charts.

In 2022, the band created a non-alcoholic beer named ‘Fake Magic Lager’ after the track. The lager was created in collaboration with First Nations owned non-alcoholic drinks company Sobah Beverages, as part of a sustainability initiative for ING Australia.

== Reception ==
Kat Bein from Billboard described "Fake Magic" as "hip house pop with a tinge of darkness to keep things interesting."

Triple J dubbed the song "a lush, funky throwback jam with a tasty, punctuated vocal line from Aluna. Like most of the mega-singles in their back catalogue, 'Fake Magic' is a strut-ready d-floor banger."

== Track listing ==
Digital download
No.	Title	Length
1.	"Fake Magic"	2:45

== Charts ==
Chart (2017)	Peak position
Australia (ARIA)	34

== Certifications ==
Region	Certification	Certified units/sales
Australia (ARIA)	3× Platinum	210,000^{‡}
New Zealand (RMNZ)	Platinum	30,000^{‡}
^{‡} Sales+streaming figures based on certification alone.
