= Sugar (Peking Duk and Jack River song) =

2019 song by Peking Duk and Jack River

Single by Peking Duk and Jack River
- Released: 17 January 2019
- Length: 3:11
- Label: Sony Music Australia
- Songwriters: Adam Hyde, Reuben Styles, Holly Rankin, Xavier Dunn, Kaelyn Behr
- Producers: Adam Hyde, Reuben Styles, Kaelyn Behr

Peking Duk singles chronology
"Fire" (2018)	"Sugar" (2019)	"Ur Eyez" (2019)

Jack River singles chronology
"Limo Song" (2018)	"Sugar" (2019)

"Sugar" is a song by Australian electronic music duo Peking Duk and Jack River. The song was released on 17 January 2019 and peaked at number 54 on the Australian ARIA Singles Chart.

At the ARIA Music Awards of 2019, the song was nominated for Best Dance Release.

== Background and release ==
Jack River (whose real name is Holly Rankin) supported Peking Duk duo on their 2018 Australian tour and became friends. Peking Duk said "We've always loved what Jack River does and how she does it, so once she said that she loved the idea and hopped on the song, everything fit perfectly. She changed what was once a sombre melancholic skeleton of a song in to a fun, playful and sugary playground."

Jack River said it became "a bucket list item" to work with Peking Duk. She said "I had a vision for some time of making a whole song inspired by the vocals from all the amazing pop songs I grew up on. We all loved this idea and started to listen to all the best sounds of the early 2000s. We wanted to make something that felt like the sugar-candy world Jack River but dragged into the world of a soft drink commercial, or something an Ice Cream truck might blare on the boardwalks of LA."

Peking Duk's Adam Hyde describes the finished product as "a mix between Lou Bega and Darude".

== Track listing ==
Digital download
No.	Title	Length
1.	"Sugar"	3:11

== Charts ==
Chart (2019)	Peak position
Australia (ARIA)	54

== Certifications ==
Region	Certification	Certified units/sales
Australia (ARIA)	Platinum	70,000^{‡}
New Zealand (RMNZ)	Gold	15,000^{‡}
^{‡} Sales+streaming figures based on certification alone.
