= High (Peking Duk song) =

Single by Peking Duk featuring Nicole Millar

from the EP Songs to Sweat To
- Released: 14 February 2014
- Genre: EDM; indie electronic; electro house; synthpop
- Length: 3:48
- Label: Vicious Recordings
- Songwriters: Adam Hyde, Reuben Styles, Nicole Millar & Sam Littlemore
- Producers: Adam Hyde, Reuben Styles

Peking Duk singles chronology
"Mufasa" (2014)	"High" (2014)	"Take Me Over" (2014)

"High" is a song by Australian electronic music duo Peking Duk. The song features vocals from Nicole Millar. It was written and produced by Adam Hyde and Reuben Styles, Nicole Millar & Sam Littlemore. The song was released on 14 February 2014, by Vicious Recordings as the lead single from the duo's debut EP, Songs to Sweat To.

High reached a peak of #13 on the New Zealand charts and #5 on the Australian ARIA Charts, where the song also received a triple platinum certification by the Australian Recording Industry Association

The song placed at #2 on the Triple J Hottest 100, 2014, and in 2025, the song placed 82 on the Triple J's Hottest 100 of Australian Songs. It was also included in the soundtrack for the football simulation game Pro Evolution Soccer 2017.

At the AIR Awards of 2014, the song won Best Independent Dance/Electronica or Club Single.

== Remixes ==
A remix single was released on 4 April 2014.

1. "High" (Funkin Matt remix) – 4:22
2. "High" (Terace remix) – 5:11
3. "High" (Jealous Much? remix) – 4:14
4. "High" (CRNKN remix) – 4:50

== Charts ==
=== Weekly charts ===
Chart (2014)	Peak position
Australia (ARIA)	5
New Zealand (Recorded Music NZ)	13

=== Year-end charts ===
Chart (2014)	Position
Australia (ARIA)	35

== Certifications ==
Region	Certification	Certified units/sales
Australia (ARIA)	4× Platinum	280,000^{‡}
New Zealand (RMNZ)	3× Platinum	90,000^{‡}
^{‡} Sales+streaming figures based on certification alone.
