= Songs to Sweat To =

EP by Peking Duk
- Released: 31 July 2015
- Genre: Alternative rock
- Length: 18:25
- Labels: Vicious Recordings, RCA
- Producer: Peking Duk

Peking Duk chronology
Songs to Sweat To (2015)	Reprisal (2018)

Singles from Songs To Sweat To
- 1. "High" Released: 14 February 2014; 2. "Take Me Over" Released: 10 October 2014; 3. "Say My Name" Released: 10 July 2015

Songs to Sweat To is the debut extended play (EP) by Australian electronic music duo Peking Duk, released in the US on 31 July 2015.

== Track listing ==
No.	Title	Length
1.	"Say My Name" (featuring Benjamin Joseph)	3:07
2.	"High" (featuring Nicole Millar)	3:48
3.	"Take Me Over" (featuring Safia)	3:28
4.	"High" (featuring Nicole Millar; Lenno remix)	4:06
5.	"Take Me Over" (featuring Safia; Neus remix)	3:56

== Release history ==
Region	Date	Format	Label
United States	31 July 2015	Digital download	Vicious Recordings, RCA
