= Let You Down (Peking Duk song) =

Single by Peking Duk featuring Icona Pop
- Released: 13 October 2017
- Genre: Future bass
- Length: 3:38
- Label: Sony Music Australia
- Songwriters: Kaelyn Behr; Adam Hyde; Reuben Styles; Sam Manville; Robert Tailor
- Producers: Styalz Fuego; Peking Duk

Peking Duk singles chronology
"Fake Magic" (2017)	"Let You Down" (2017)	"Wasted" (2018)

Icona Pop singles chronology
"Girls Girls" (2017)	"Let You Down" (2017)	"Det måste gå" (2017)

"Let You Down" is a song by Australian electronic music duo Peking Duk featuring Swedish duo Icona Pop. The song was released on 13 October 2017 and has peaked at number 37 on the Australian ARIA Singles Chart. The song features the vocals of Peking Duk member Adam Hyde, marking the first time that either of the duo’s members have performed vocals on one of their songs.

Peking Duk described the song as a "modern heartbreak anthem" and say it was inspired by the 2006 film, Candy, with the story being told from Heath Ledger's perspective.

At the APRA Music Awards of 2019, the song was nominated for Dance Work of the Year.

== Track listing ==
Digital download
No.	Title	Length
1.	"Let You Down"	3:38

== Charts ==
Chart (2017)	Peak position
Australia (ARIA)	37

== Certifications ==
Region	Certification	Certified units/sales
Australia (ARIA)	2× Platinum	140,000^{‡}
New Zealand (RMNZ)	Gold	15,000^{‡}
^{‡} Sales+streaming figures based on certification alone.
