= Capital Fiction =

Studio album by Keli Holiday
- Released: 13 February 2026
- Length: 28:43
- Producers: Alex Cameron; Adam Hyde; Konstantin Kersting; George William Lewis; Thomas Stell

Keli Holiday chronology
Jesterman (2024)	Capital Fiction (2026)

Singles from Capital Fiction
- 1. "Dancing2" Released: 12 August 2025; 2. "Ecstasy" Released: 7 November 2025; 3. "More" Released: 13 February 2026

Capital Fiction is the second studio album by Australian musician Adam Hyde under the alias Keli Holiday. The album was announced in November 2025 and released on 13 February 2026.

Upon release, Hyde said "It's kind of like synth-punk-rock; a fun time with emotion peppered throughout. It's kind of horny. It's also quite vulnerable. The main thing with the songs was trying to stay true to the sonic identity of it all, which is funny because there is no real identity."

The album will be supported across March 2026 with an Australian Capital Fiction Tour 2026.

The album was nominated for the 2026 NSW Music Prize.

== Critical reception ==
Rolling Stone Australia said "Capital Fiction is a bold, uninhibited statement on sex, love, rock 'n' roll and everything in between. While the album is full of high-octane moments, including a sneaky sample from Aussie dance music royalty The Presets in 'Plastic', it also reveals a softer side to Hyde, with tender tracks like 'Sacred Sweat' and the heartfelt closing ballad 'Favourite Stranger'."

Chris Lamaro from AAA Backstage called it "a confident, cohesive record that sees Adam Hyde fully inhabit the Keli Holiday universe — unfiltered, theatrical and unapologetically romantic."

== Track listing ==
Capital Fiction track listing
No.	Title	Writer(s)	Producer(s)	Length
1.	"Dancing2"	Adam Hyde; Alex Cameron; Konstantin Kersting	Hyde; Cameron; Kersting	4:32
2.	"Plastic"	Hyde; Julian Hamilton; Kersting; Kim Moyes	Hyde; Kersting	2:17
3.	"Ecstasy"	Hyde; Romanie Assez; Kersting; Thomas Stell	Hyde; Kersting; Stell	2:21
4.	"Somebody"	Hyde; Kersting	Hyde; Kersting	2:18
5.	"Secret Sweat"	Hyde; Kersting	Hyde; Kersting	3:06
6.	"Life of the Party"	Hyde; Cameron; Kersting; George William Lewis; Stell	Hyde; Cameron; Kersting; Lewis; Stell	3:18
7.	"More"	Hyde; Kersting; Lewis	Hyde; Kersting; Lewis	2:16
8.	"Believe in God"	Hyde; Kersting; Adrian Rodriguez	Hyde; Kersting	2:48
9.	"Crooked Teeth"	Hyde; Kersting	Hyde; Kersting	2:10
10.	"Favourite Stranger"	Hyde; Kersting; Shaan Ramaprasad	Hyde; Kersting	3:31
Total length:				28:43

== Personnel ==
Credits adapted from Tidal.

- Keli Holiday – vocals
- Ashley Hutton – saxophone on "Dancing2" and "Believe In God"
- Ali Jamieson – keyboards and programming on "Plastic"
- Hal Ritson – keyboards and programming on "Plastic"
- Richard Adlam – keyboards and programming on "Plastic"

== Charts ==
Chart performance for Capital Fiction
Chart (2026)	Peak position
Australian Albums (ARIA)	3
