= Roots of Style =

Roots Of Style

Studio album by Toshinori Yonekura
- Released: March 13, 2002
- Recorded: 2001–2002 at Cloud 9, The Cutting Room Recording Studio, Soho Music Studios, Fast Forward Studio, Black Pearl Studio, Quad Recording Studio,
- Genres: Pop, R&B
- Length: 52:33
- Label: Warner Music Group
- Producers: "Prince Charles" Alexander, Fulani Hart

Toshinori Yonekura chronology
O (2001)	Roots Of Style (2002)	Sang My Thang (2005)

Roots Of Style is Toshinori Yonekura's 12th original studio album. The album was recorded in New York City with producer "Prince Charles" Alexander.

== Track list ==
#	Title	Composition	Time
1.	"Caramel Magic"	Toshinori Yonekura	5:50
2.	"Yokogao"	Toshinori Yonekura	4:49
3.	"Strawberry Cheese Cake"	Toshinori Yonekura	6:37
4.	"Lover's Error"	Toshinori Yonekura	4:42
5.	"Cappuccino"	Toshinori Yonekura	6:13
6.	"Nobody's Perfect"	Toshinori Yonekura	4:09
7.	"Kusuriyubi"	Toshinori Yonekura	5:20
8.	"No Need For Reason"	Toshinori Yonekura	5:44
9.	"Embrace"	Toshinori Yonekura	5:08
10.	"Where Love Rules"	Toshinori Yonekura	4:06

== Personnel ==
- Toshinori Yonekura - Vocals, background vocals
- Prince Charles Alexander - Production, drum programming
- Cliff "Big Daddy" Branch - Keyboards, drum programming
- Elai Tubo - drum programming
- Ira Siegel - Guitar
- Fulani Hart - Keyboards
- Shindigg - Bass

== Production ==
- Executive Producer - Toshinori Yonekura
- Producer - Prince Charles Alexander, Fulani Hart
- Co-Producer - Cliff "Big Daddy" Branch
- Vocal arrangement - Toshinori Yonkeura
- Mastering - Chris Gehringer
- Art Direction - Tomoaki Sakai
- Design: Azusa Irie
- Styling - Shuhei Yomo, Ryohei Oasa
- Hair & Make-Up - Toshinori Yonekura
- Photography - Takayuki Okada

== Charts ==
Album - Oricon Sales Chart (Japan)

Release	Chart	Peak Position	First Week	Sales Total	Chart Run
March 13, 2002	Oricon Weekly Albums Chart	16	20,100		2 weeks
