= Tremble (EP) =

EP by Nicole Millar
- Released: 5 February 2016
- Genres: Alternative pop, electronic music
- Label: Universal Music Australia / EMI Music

Nicole Millar chronology
Tremble (2016)	Communication (2016)

Singles from Tremble
- 1. "Wait" Released: October 2015; 2. "Tremble" Released: 29 January 2016

Tremble is a debut EP by Australian pop singer Nicole Millar. It was released on 5 February 2016.

Millar said she was inspired by The Weeknd, Major Lazer and MØ and upon release, said; “I listen to a lot of R&B and their lyrics are quite full on. I wanted to take the female angle on that and own it. In a lot of pop songs, the girl is always so sad because the boy’s broken their heart. I wanted to make her far more powerful and assertive.”

Millar promoted the EP with 'The Tremble Tour' across Australia throughout March and April.

== Critical reception ==
The Foundry Brisbane said: "Nicole has created an immense hype towards this release after her successful debut single 'Wait' was released in late October last year. 'Tremble' boasts beats and synths that make the track feel full and complement the depth of Nicole's voice. Starting off smooth and ultra sultry, it kicks up the tempo quickly, adding a power and playfulness that sees Nicole take you on a journey from beginning to end."

AAA Backstage gave the EP 3 out of 5, particularly complimenting the tracks "Tremble" and "Cover Me".

== Track listing ==
No.	Title	Length
1.	"Wait"	3:05
2.	"The Zone"	3:15
3.	"Tremble"	3:17
4.	"Cover Me"	4:03

== Chart positions ==
Chart (2016)	Peak position
Australia (ARIA)	53
Australian Artist (ARIA)	7

== Release history ==
Region	Date	Format	Label	Catalogue
Australia	5 February 2016	Digital download	Universal Music Australia / EMI Music	
Australia	29 July 2016	Compact Disc	Universal Music Australia / EMI Music	5708477
