= Peking Duk =

Australian electronic music group

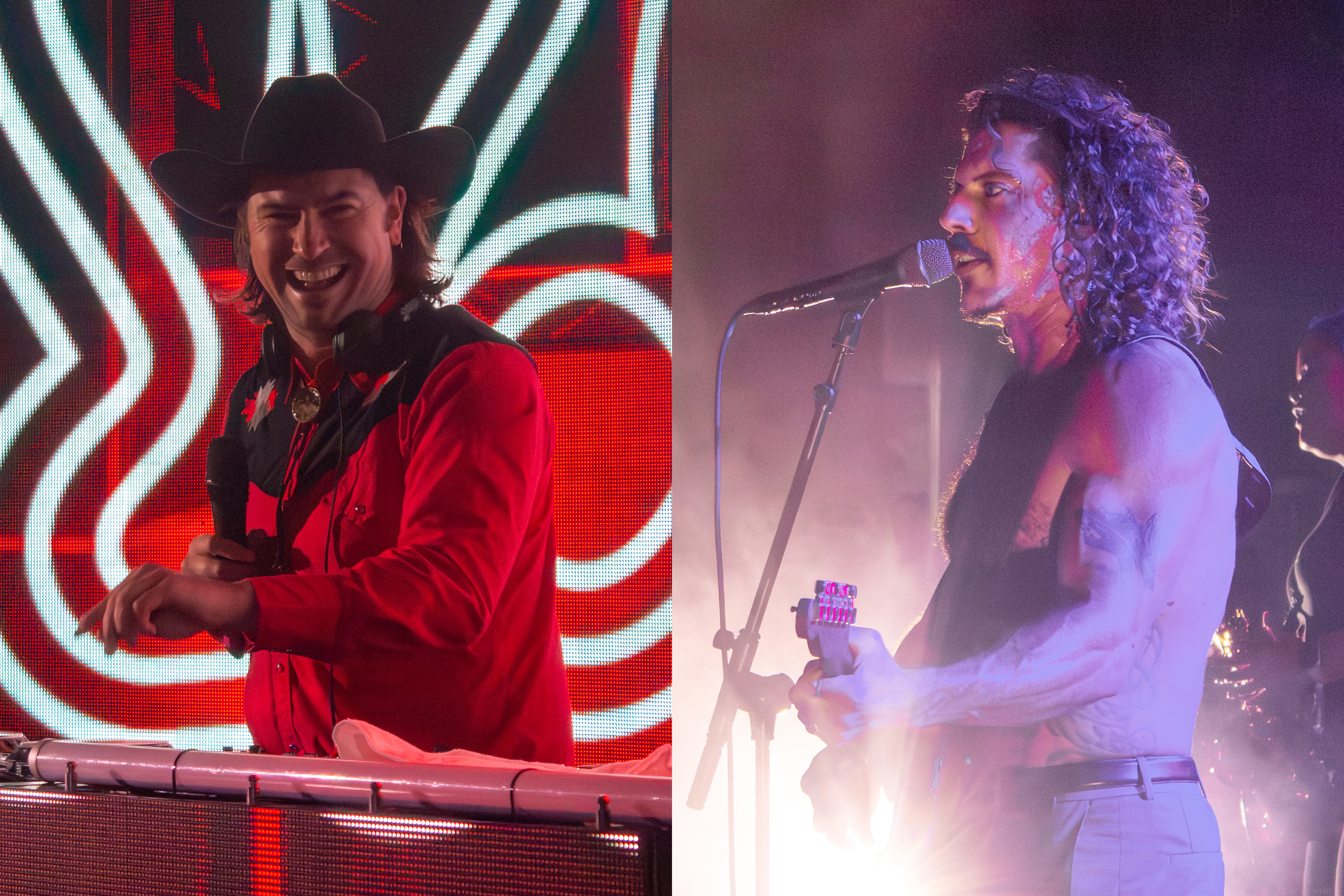
- Styles (left) and Hyde (right) performing in February 2026

Background information
- Origin: Canberra, Australia
- Genres: House, electro house, alternative dance
- Years active: 2010–present
- Labels: Vicious (2010–2014); RCA/Sony (2014–present)
- Spinoff of: Rubycon
- Members: Reuben Styles; Adam Hyde
- Website: pekingduk.com

Peking Duk is an Australian electronic music duo from Canberra, made up of disc jockeys and record producers Adam Hyde and Reuben Styles. The pair first garnered attention in 2013 with the release of a Passion Pit bootleg remix. Their biggest hit, "High", reached 5 on the ARIA Singles Chart, achieved a triple platinum certification, and won the ARIA Award for Best Dance Release at the ARIA Music Awards of 2014. Notable festivals Peking Duk have performed include Falls Festival, Spilt Milk, Splendour in the Grass, and Big Day Out.

== History ==
=== 2010–2024: Career beginnings and early success ===
Peking Duk was formed in 2010 in Canberra, Australia, by Adam Hyde and Reuben Styles. The pair had started off in their local city of Canberra. Styles had been the bass guitarist for local indie rock group, Rubycon, from 2007 to 2010. They released their debut single "Bingo Trippin'" in May 2011. Upon the release of their Passion Pit bootleg remix in May 2012, the pair gained attention from music blogs.

In February 2013, Peking Duk released "The Way You Are", their first international single. Peking Duk placed 4th in the Australia wide InTheMix Top 50 competition in 2013. This was their second year in a row in the top 10 of the competition (6th in 2012). 2013 also saw Peking Duk receive strong support from national youth broadcaster Triple J. Along with having their tracks added to rotation, Triple J also gave Peking Duk the opportunity to be a Triple J Mix Up resident which saw them present and host a weekly DJ Mix on Saturday nights for a month. In August 2013, Peking Duk released "Feels Like".

In February 2014, they had their first Top 40 hit on the ARIA Singles Chart with their track "High" featuring Australian vocalist Nicole Millar. In August 2014, Peking Duk signed a worldwide record deal with Sony Music Entertainment in conjunction with RCA Records. In July 2015, Peking Duk released the single called "Say My Name" featuring Benjamin Joseph. Peking Duk released an international EP titled Songs to Sweat To.

In March 2019, the pair embarked on their biggest national tour to date bringing along Kwame and Kira Puru as supports. In April 2020, Australian radio station Triple J premiered a new song by the duo in collaboration with Ben O'Connor called "Stay The F*ck Home", as part of a COVID-19 self-isolation musical challenge nicknamed Quarantune.

The duo collaborated with Australian artists Julia Stone and Dean Brady in March 2023 for their Like a Version of Crowded House's single "Fall at Your Feet". The song was voted in as number 64 on the Triple J Hottest 100 2023, the highest Like of a Version of the year.

=== 2025–present: Paradise ===
In March 2026, Peking Duk announced their debut studio album, Paradise. The album was preceded by the singles "Thrills", "Forever", "Do Your Best", "Let Go" and "Can't Fit In".

=== Wikipedia backstage incident ===
At 12:48 UTC on 2 December 2015, at a show in Melbourne, a fan named David Spargo accessed the backstage area by anonymously editing the band's Wikipedia page and inserting the text "Family David Spargo" at the end of the lead section. Upon showing the article and his ID to the security guards, he was granted access to the band with whom he shared a beer. The band reacted positively to this scheme, stating: "He explained to us his amazing tactic to get past security to hang with us and we immediately cracked him a beer. This dude is the definition of a legend." However, Hyde did add: "It goes to show, never trust Wikipedia".

== Discography ==
=== Studio albums ===
List of studio albums
Title	Album details	Peak chart positions
Title	Album details	AUS
Paradise	Released: 14 August 2026; Label: Peking Duk, Virgin; Format: Digital download, CD, LP	6

=== Extended plays ===
List of extended plays, with selected chart positions
Title	Details	Peak chart positions	Certifications
Title	Details	AUS	Certifications
Songs to Sweat To	Release date: 31 July 2015; Label: Vicious Recordings / RCA; Formats: Digital download	Not released in Australia	
Reprisal	Release date: 11 May 2018; Label: Sony Music Australia; Formats: Digital download, streaming	12	ARIA: 5× Platinum

=== Singles ===
List of singles, with selected chart positions and certifications, showing year released and album name
Title	Year	Peak chart positions		Certifications	Album
Title	Year	AUS	NZ	Certifications	Album
"Bingo Trippin"	2011	—	—		Non-album singles
"Welcome" (featuring Stef K.)	2011	—	—		Non-album singles
"I Love to Rap"	2012	—	—		Non-album singles
"The Way You Are"	2012	102	—		Non-album singles
"You Are Like Nobody Else" (with Swanky Tunes featuring James McNally)	2013	—	—		Non-album singles
"Feels Like"	2013	83	—		Non-album singles
"Mufasa" (with Laidback Luke)	2014	—	—		Non-album singles
"High" (featuring Nicole Millar)	2014	5	13	ARIA: 4× Platinum; RMNZ: 3× Platinum	Songs to Sweat To
"Take Me Over" (featuring Safia)	2014	6	32	ARIA: 3× Platinum; RMNZ: 2× Platinum	Songs to Sweat To
"Say My Name" (featuring Benjamin Joseph)	2015	29	—	ARIA: Platinum; RMNZ: Gold	Songs to Sweat To
"Stranger" (featuring Elliphant)	2016	5	20	ARIA: 5× Platinum; RMNZ: 2× Platinum	Non-album singles
"Fake Magic" (with AlunaGeorge)	2017	34	— (Note: "Fake Magic" did not enter the NZ Top 40 Singles Chart, but peaked at number four on the NZ Heatseeker Singles Chart.)	ARIA: 3× Platinum; RMNZ: Platinum	Non-album singles
"Let You Down" (featuring Icona Pop)	2017	37	— (Note: "Let You Down" did not enter the NZ Top 40 Singles Chart, but peaked at number three on the NZ Heatseeker Singles Chart.)	ARIA: 2× Platinum; RMNZ: Gold	Non-album singles
"Wasted"	2018	66	— (Note: "Wasted" did not enter the NZ Top 40 Singles Chart, but peaked at number four on the NZ Heatseeker Singles Chart.)	ARIA: Platinum; RMNZ: Gold	Non-album singles
"Fire" (featuring Sarah Aarons)	2018	— (Note: In Australia, Reprisal appeared on the Australian Singles Chart; songs on the EP therefore could not chart separately.)	— (Note: "Fire" did not enter the NZ Top 40 Singles Chart, but peaked at number five on the NZ Heatseeker Singles Chart.)	RMNZ: Platinum	Reprisal
"Distant Arizona" (featuring Cloud Control)	2018	—	—		Reprisal
"Sugar" (featuring Jack River)	2019	54	— (Note: "Sugar" did not enter the NZ Top 40 Singles Chart, but peaked at number 10 on the NZ Hot Singles Chart.)	ARIA: Platinum; RMNZ: Gold	Non-album singles
"Ur Eyez" (featuring Al Wright)	2019	—	— (Note: "Ur Eyez" did not enter the NZ Top 40 Singles Chart, but peaked at number 28 on the NZ Hot Singles Chart.)		Non-album singles
"Move" (featuring Alisa Xayalith)	2020	—	— (Note: "Move" did not enter the NZ Top 40 Singles Chart, but peaked at number 30 on the NZ Hot Singles Chart.)		Non-album singles
"Nothing to Love About Love" (with The Wombats)	2020	—	—		Non-album singles
"Lil Bit" (with Tommy Trash)	2020	—	— (Note: "Lil Bit" did not enter the NZ Top 40 Singles Chart, but peaked at number 28 on the NZ Hot Singles Chart.)		Non-album singles
"Chemicals" (featuring Sarah Aarons)	2021	135	— (Note: "Chemicals" did not enter the NZ Top 40 Singles Chart, but peaked at number 20 on the NZ Hot Singles Chart.)		Non-album singles
"Honest" (featuring Slayyyter)	2022	—	—		Non-album singles
"Spend It" (featuring Circa Waves)	2022	—	— (Note: "Spend It" did not enter the NZ Top 40 Singles Chart, but peaked at number 16 on the NZ Hot Singles Chart.)		Non-album singles
"I Want You" (featuring Darren Hayes)	2023	—	—		Non-album singles
"Fall at Your Feet" (Like a Version) (featuring Julia Stone)	2023	—	—		Non-album singles
"Stop the Music" (featuring FEYI)	2024	—	—		Non-album singles
"Around U" (with Drax Project and Kita Alexander)	2025	—	— (Note: "Around U" did not enter the NZ Top 40 Singles Chart, but peaked at number 23 on the NZ Hot Singles Chart.)		Non-album singles
"Thrills" (featuring Rico Nasty)	2026	—	— (Note: "Thrills" did not enter the NZ Top 40 Singles Chart, but peaked at number 24 on the NZ Hot Singles Chart.)		Paradise
"Forever" (featuring Phantograml)	2026	—	— (Note: "Forever" did not enter the NZ Top 40 Singles Chart, but peaked at number 32 on the NZ Hot Singles Chart.)		Paradise
"Do Your Best" (featuring Kah-Lo)	2026	—	— (Note: "Do Your Best" did not enter the NZ Top 40 Singles Chart, but peaked at number 39 on the NZ Hot Singles Chart.)		Paradise
"Let Go" (with Matt Corby)	2026	—	—		Paradise
"Can’t Fit In" (with Killer Mike, Nate Husser and Kingstarlight)	2026	—	— (Note: "Can't Fit In" did not enter the NZ Top 40 Singles Chart, but peaked at number 33 on the NZ Hot Singles Chart.)		Paradise

=== Other appearances ===
List of other non-single song appearances
Title	Year	Album
"Cocaine Killa" (with Daniel Johns)	2022	FutureNever

=== Remixes ===
- Liz – "U Over Them" (Peking Duk & CRNKN Remix) [Mad Decent]
- Dem Slackers – "Sclingel" (Peking Duk Remix) [Tuffemup!]
- Rob Pix – "Beng" (Peking Duk Remix) [Downright]
- Steve Aoki & Angger Dimas featuring Iggy Azalea – "Beat Down" (Peking Duk Remix) [Dim Mak]
- DCUP – "I'm Corrupt" (Peking Duk Remix) [Chookie]
- Fitz and the Tantrums – "Out of My League" (Peking Duk Remix) [WMG]

=== Bootlegs ===
- Passion Pit – "Take A Walk" (Peking Duk Remix)
- Ben Howard – "Old Pine" (Peking Duk Remix)

== Awards and nominations ==
=== AIR Awards ===
The Australian Independent Record Awards (commonly known informally as AIR Awards) is an annual awards night to recognise, promote and celebrate the success of Australia's Independent Music sector.

Year	Nominee / work	Award	Result	Ref.
2014	"High" (featuring Nicole Millar)	Best Independent Dance/Electronica or Club Single	Won	

=== APRA Awards ===
Since 1982 the APRA Awards are run by Australian Performing Right Association to recognise songwriting skills, sales and airplay performance by its members annually.

Year	Nominee / work	Award	Result	Ref.
2015	"High" (featuring Nicole Millar) – Adam Hyde, Reuben Styles, Nicole Millar & Sam Littlemore	Song of the Year	Shortlisted	
2015	"High" (featuring Nicole Millar) – Adam Hyde, Reuben Styles, Nicole Millar & Sam Littlemore	Dance Work of the Year	Nominated	
2016	"Take Me Over" (featuring Safia) – Kaelyn Behr, Adam Hyde, Reuben Styles, Ben Woolner-Kirkham	Most Played Australian Work	Won	
2016	"Take Me Over" (featuring Safia) – Kaelyn Behr, Adam Hyde, Reuben Styles, Ben Woolner-Kirkham	Dance Work of the Year	Won	
2018	"Stranger" (featuring Elliphant) – Adam Hyde, Reuben Styles, Kaelyn Behr, Elliphant, Daniel Goudie, Ashley Milton	Dance Work of the Year	Won	
2018	"Stranger" (featuring Elliphant) – Adam Hyde, Reuben Styles, Kaelyn Behr, Elliphant, Daniel Goudie, Ashley Milton	Most Played Australian Work	Won	
2018	"Fake Magic" (featuring AlunaGeorge) – Adam Hyde, Reuben Styles, Sam Littlemore, Laura Lowther, Frances Dewji, George Reid	Dance Work of the Year	Nominated	
2019	"Let You Down" (featuring Icona Pop) – Kaelyn Behr Adam Hyde, Reuben Styles, Sam Manville, Robert Tailor	Dance Work of the Year	Nominated	
2020	"Sugar" (featuring Jack River) – Kaelyn Behr, Adam Hyde, Reuben Styles	Most Performed Dance Work of the Year	Nominated	
2022	"Nothing to Love About Love" (featuring The Wombats) – Adam Hyde, Reuben Styles, Matthew Murphy, Tyler Spry	Most Performed Dance/Electronic Work	Nominated	
2023	"Honest" (featuring Slayyyter) – Adam Hyde, Reuben Styles, Kirsty Peters	Most Performed Dance/Electronic Work	Nominated	
2024	"Spend It!" (featuring Circa Waves) – Adam Hyde, Reuben Styles, Circa Waves, Johan Gustafsson, Kieran Shudhall, Gustav Gallhagan, Jackson Brazier, Sam Littlemore	Most Performed Dance/Electronic Work	Nominated	

=== ARIA Music Awards ===
The ARIA Music Awards is an annual awards ceremony that recognises excellence, innovation, and achievement across all genres of Australian music.

Year	Nominee / work	Award	Result	Ref.
2014	"High" (featuring Nicole Millar)	Best Dance Release	Won	
2015	"Take Me Over" (featuring Safia)	Best Dance Release	Nominated	
2015	"Take Me Over" (featuring Safia)	Song of the Year	Nominated	
2017	"Stranger" (featuring Elliphant)	Song of the Year	Won	
2017	"Stranger" (featuring Elliphant)	Best Dance Release	Nominated	
2017	"Stranger" (featuring Elliphant)	Best Group	Nominated	
2017	Clowntown Tour	Best Australian Live Act	Nominated	
2018	"Fire" (featuring Sarah Aarons)	Best Group	Nominated	
2018	"Fire" (featuring Sarah Aarons)	Best Dance Release	Nominated	
2018	"Fire" (featuring Sarah Aarons)	Song of the Year	Nominated	
2018	Ryan Sauer and Peking Duk - "Fire"	Best Video	Nominated	
2018	The Wasted Tour	Best Australian Live Act	Nominated	
2019	"Sugar" (featuring Jack River)	Best Dance Release	Nominated	
2019	Peking Duk's Biggest Tour Ever... So Far	Best Australian Live Act	Nominated	

=== MTV Europe Music Awards ===
The MTV Europe Music Awards is an award presented by Viacom International Media Networks to honour artists and music in pop culture.

Year	Nominee / work	Award	Result	Ref.
2015	themselves	Best Australian Act	Nominated	
2018	themselves	Best Australian Act	Nominated	

=== National Live Music Awards ===
The National Live Music Awards (NLMAs) are a broad recognition of Australia's diverse live industry, celebrating the success of the Australian live scene. The awards commenced in 2016.

Year	Nominee / work	Award	Result	Ref.
2017	Peking Duk	Live Electronic Act (or DJ) of the Year	Won	
2018	Peking Duk	International Live Achievement (Band)	Nominated	
2020	Peking Duk	Musicians Making a Difference	Nominated	
