= Take Me Over (Peking Duk song) =

Single by Peking Duk featuring SAFIA

from the EP Songs to Sweat To
- Released: 10 October 2014
- Genre: EDM; indie electronic; electro house; synthpop
- Length: 3:28
- Label: Vicious Recordings
- Songwriters: Kaelyn Behr; Adam Hyde; Reuben Styles; Ben Woolner-Kirkham
- Producers: Adam Hyde; Reuben Styles

Peking Duk singles chronology
"High" (2014)	"Take Me Over" (2014)	"Say My Name" (2015)

SAFIA singles chronology
"You Are the One" (2014)	"Take Me Over" (2014)	"Counting Sheep" (2015)

Music video
- "Take Me Over" on YouTube

"Take Me Over" is a song by Australian electronic music duo Peking Duk. The song features vocals from SAFIA. It was produced by Adam Hyde and Reuben Styles of Peking Duk. The song was released on 10 October 2014 by Vicious Recordings as the second single from the duo’s debut EP, Songs to Sweat To.

"Take Me Over" reached a peak of number 32 on the New Zealand charts and number 6 on the Australian ARIA Charts, where the song also received a certification of 2× Platinum. The song placed at number 5 on the Triple J Hottest 100, 2014.

== Music video ==
A music video to accompany the release of "Take Me Over" was released on YouTube on 19 November 2014.

== Reviews ==
Paul McBride from theaureview said; "Peking Duk have dropped another killer electro jam. Expect 'Take Me Over' to get many thousands of arms up in the air over the summer festival season."

== Remixes ==
A remix single was released on 19 December 2014.

1. "Take Me Over" (Just A Gent remix) – 4:59
2. "Take Me Over" (NEUS remix) – 3:55
3. "Take Me Over" (Sonny Fodera remix) – 6:09

== Charts ==
=== Weekly charts ===
Chart (2014)	Peak position
Australia (ARIA)	6
New Zealand (Recorded Music NZ)	32

=== Year-end charts ===
Chart (2014)	Position
Australia (ARIA)	91
Chart (2015)	Position
Australia (ARIA)	90

== Certifications ==
Region	Certification	Certified units/sales
Australia (ARIA)	3× Platinum	210,000^{‡}
New Zealand (RMNZ)	2× Platinum	60,000^{‡}
^{‡} Sales+streaming figures based on certification alone.
