= Lithe (singer) =

Australian rapper and singer

- Born: Josiah Ramel
- Origin: Melbourne, Australia
- Occupations: Rapper; singer; songwriter; record producer
- Years active: 2017–present
- Website: lithe-music.com

Josiah Ramel, better known as his stage name Lithe, is an Australian rapper, singer-songwriter, and record producer. Originating from Melbourne, Lithe gained mainstream attention from his 2024 single, "Fall Back", which received two remixes—one featuring Canadian rapper Nav and another featuring American rapper Lil Tjay.

== Early life ==
Ramel was born in 1996, in Melbourne, Victoria. Long before the rise of his dark trap-soul records and mysterious lifestyle, his upbringing was largely shaped by a musical household and elite-level competitive athletics.

His father, an immigrant, had been obsessed with music his whole life and had been in a band since youth. Ultimately, he gave up his musical career to raise his family, however he continued to fill his family's household with a diverse mix of records including French music, reggae, and classic soul. In an interview with Billboard, a premier music and entertainment media brand, Lithe stated "[I] kinda had the torch passed".

Before committing to a life of songwriting and producing, Ramel was a highly competitive soccer player. In 2014, when he was 17, he was selected to represent the Under 19 Victorian State Team at the School Sport Australia Football Championships.

== Early Career ==
Around the age of 13, Ramel began teaching himself music production as a creative outlet, stating "It was the only way I saw for getting out". Throughout high school, he began DJing local house parties and ultimately got his foot in the door of the Melbourne club scene by producing dancefloor-friendly edits and bootlegs.

Between the ages of 17-18, Ramel found himself frustrated trying to source vocalists in Australia who matched his moody creative vision. Finding the local trap and hip-hop community lacked the specific tone he wanted, he decided to start recording his own vocals over his dark, ambient beats purely out of necessity.

== Discography ==
=== Studio albums ===
List of studio albums, with release date, label, formats, and selected chart positions shown
Title	Album details	Peak chart positions
Title	Album details	AUS
Euphoria	Released: 14 November 2025; Label: GSL, 10k Projects, Atlantic; Formats: Digital download, streaming	— (Note: "Euphoria" did not enter the ARIA Top 100 Albums Chart, but peaked at number 2 on the ARIA Top 10 Australian Hip Hop/R&B Albums Chart and at number 18 on the ARIA Top 40 Hip Hop/R&B Albums Chart, respectively.)
"—" denotes a recording that did not chart or was not released in that territory.

=== Extended plays ===
List of extended plays, with release date, label, formats, and selected chart positions shown
Title	EP details	Peak chart positions
Title	EP details	AUS
What Would You Do?	Released: 25 July 2024; Label: GSL; Formats: Digital download, streaming	—
Lost in Euphoria	Released: 21 March 2025; Label: GSL; Formats: Digital download, streaming	— (Note: "Lost in Euphoria" did not enter the ARIA Top 100 Albums Chart, but peaked at number 3 on the ARIA Top 10 Australian Hip Hop/R&B Albums Chart.)

=== Charted singles ===
==== As lead artist ====
List of singles as lead artist, with year released, selected chart positions, certifications, and album name shown
Title	Year	Peak chart positions									Certifications	Album
Title	Year	AUS	AUT	FRA	GER	NLD	NZ Hot	POR	SWI	UK	Certifications	Album
"Fall Back"	2024	56	27	108	28	91	17	81	21	58	ARIA: Platinum	What Would You Do?
"Tempt Me"	2024	—	—	—	—	—	40	—	—	—		What Would You Do?
"Touch Tight"	2024	—	—	—	—	—	22	—	—	—		Lost in Euphoria
"Rolling Stone"	2025	—	—	—	—	—	24	—	—	—		Lost in Euphoria
"If I Could"	2025	—	—	—	—	—	38	—	—	—		Lost in Euphoria
"444"	2025	—	—	—	—	—	29	—	—	—		Lost in Euphoria
"Cannonball" (featuring Don Toliver)	2025	— (Note: "Cannonball" did not enter the Australian Top 100 Singles Chart, but peaked at number 12 on the Top 20 Australian Artist Singles Chart.)	—	—	—	—	11	—	—	—		Euphoria
"Name My Price"	2025	—	—	—	—	—	35	—	—	—		Euphoria
"FaceTime" (featuring Don Toliver)	2025	—	—	—	—	—	30	—	—	—		Euphoria
"Making Promises"	2026	—	—	—	—	—	30	—	—	—		Non-album singles
"Leaning"	2026	—	—	—	—	—	34	—	—	—		Non-album singles
"—" denotes a recording that did not chart or was not released in that territory.

==== As featured artist ====
List of singles as featured artist, with year released, selected chart positions, and album name shown
Title	Year	Peak chart positions					Album
Title	Year	AUS	CAN	NZ Hot	UK	US	Album
"Rather Be" (The Kid Laroi (featuring Lithe)	2025	54	76	4	78	77	Before I Forget

== Awards and nominations ==
=== AIR Awards ===
The Australian Independent Record Awards (commonly known informally as AIR Awards) is an annual awards night to recognise, promote and celebrate the success of Australia's Independent Music sector.

Year	Nominee / work	Award	Result	Ref.
2025	What Would You Do?	Best Independent Hip Hop Album or EP	Nominated	

=== APRA Music Awards ===
The APRA Music Awards were established by Australasian Performing Right Association (APRA) in 1982 to honour the achievements of songwriters and music composers, and to recognise their song writing skills, sales and airplay performance, by its members annually.

Year	Nominee / work	Award	Result	Ref.
2025	"Fall Back" (Josiah Ramel, Omid Khasrawy)	Most Performed Hip Hop / Rap Work	Won	
2026	"Vetted" (Josiah Ramel, Omid Khasrawy)	Most Performed R&B / Soul Work	Nominated	

=== ARIA Music Awards ===
The ARIA Music Awards are a set of annual ceremonies presented by Australian Recording Industry Association (ARIA), which recognise excellence, innovation, and achievement across all genres of the music of Australia. They commenced in 1987.

Year	Nominee / work	Award	Result	Ref.
2024	"Fall Back"	Best Hip Hop/Rap Release	Nominated	
2024	"Fall Back"	Song of the Year	Nominated	
2026	"Cannonball"	Song of the Year	Nominated	

=== J Awards ===
The J Awards are an annual series of Australian music awards that were established by the Australian Broadcasting Corporation's youth-focused radio station Triple J. They commenced in 2005.

Year	Nominee / work	Award	Result	Ref.
2024	Lithe	Unearthed Artist of the Year	Won	
