= Styalz Fuego =

Australian musical artist

- Born: Kaelyn Behr; Byron Bay, New South Wales, Australia
- Genres: Hip-hop, R&B, pop, K-pop, dance
- Occupations: Music producer, vocalist, songwriter
- Years active: 2005–present
- Label: Affinity Music

Kaelyn Behr, known professionally as Styalz Fuego, is an Australian music producer, songwriter, vocalist and artist based in Melbourne. Styalz is renowned for his diverse production and songwriting, and most known for his eclectic take on hip-hop, electronic, R&B and K-pop.

Styalz's accomplishments include the 2017 ARIA Song of the Year, 2012 ARIA Producer of the Year, 2013 APRA Breakthrough Songwriter Award and 2016 and 2018 APRA Most Played Australian Work awards and integral involvement in many multi-platinum, ARIA award-winning projects across his career in Australia, UK, USA and South Korea.

He has been based in Melbourne, Australia since 2003.

== Early career ==
In 2007, Styalz produced Chamillionaire’s hit "Not a Criminal" featuring Kelis, which received negative reviews for its lacklustre lyrics and a pointless Kelis cameo. Around this time, he also began to remix songs for artists including Sneaky Sound System, Savage, and Chris Lilley’s Summer Heights High character Mr. G.

== Career ==
In 2013, Fuego co-wrote the song "Astronaut" for UK singer/songwriter Joel Compass, which was added to BBC 1.

Styalz was involved in a string of multi-platinum singles from Peking Duk, including the 2017 ARIA Song of The Year and 3× Platinum "Stranger" with Elliphant, the 4× Platinum single "Take Me Over" with Safia and Platinum "Let You Down" with Icona Pop. Styalz also co-produced Bliss n Eso's 2× Platinum single "Moments" with Gavin James, The Aston Shuffle's Gold single "Tear It Down", Seth Sentry's Gold album This Was Tomorrow and Drapht's ARIA Award-winning album Seven Mirrors.

Styalz has seen an array of international releases, including the “Most Tweeted About Song of 2017” Korean supergroup EXO's smash single "Ko Ko Bop", which propelled EXO's album The War to No. 1 in 41 countries on iTunes and now sits at over 1.5 million sales, including a Korean record 800,000 physical pre-orders. Through his other work in South Korea, Styalz also co-produced tracks for K-pop royalty in EXO-CBX, Nu’Est, TVXQ and Henry Lau.

Styalz also worked on "Ride or Die" for The Knocks & Foster The People, "Phases" for ALMA and French Montana, "Momma Always Told Me" for G-Eazy and "Certified" for Wiley and co-produced numerous Destructo singles with Ty Dolla $ign, Pusha T, E-40, Too Short, ILoveMakonnen and Starrah.

== Discography ==
In October 2013, Fuego's first official credit as a vocalist - under his given name Kaelyn Behr on the Thomas Gold collaboration "Remember" from Axwell's Axtone label - premiered on Danny Howard's BBC Radio 1 Show.

=== Singles ===
List of credited singles
Title	Year
"Remember" (Thomas Gold (featuring Kaelyn Behr)	2013
"Sooner or Later" (Adrian Lux (featuring Kaelyn Behr)	2014
"Never Fade" (Sick Individuals (featuring Kaelyn Behr)	2015
"Unraveling" (Wax Motif (featuring Kaelyn Behr)	2018

== Awards ==
=== APRA Awards ===
The APRA Awards have been presented annually from 1982 by the Australasian Performing Right Association (APRA), "honouring composers and songwriters".

Year	Nominee / work	Award	Result	Ref.
2012	"Simple Man" by Diafrix (featuring Daniel Merriweather); Khaled Abdulwahab, Kaelyn Behr, Glen Christiansen, Mohamed Komba, Daniel Merriweather	Urban Work of the Year	Nominated	
2012	"Throw It Away" – 360 (featuring Josh Pyke); Kaelyn Behr, Matthew Colwel	Urban Work of the Year	Nominated	
2013	Matthew Colwell and Kaelyn Behr	Breakthrough Songwriter of the Year	Won	
2013	"Boys like You" – 360 (featuring Gossling); Kaelyn Behr, Matthew Colwell, Francis Jones, Bradford Pinto, Jack Revens	Most Played Australian Work	Nominated	
2013	"Boys like You" – 360 (featuring Gossling); Kaelyn Behr, Matthew Colwell, Francis Jones, Bradford Pinto, Jack Revens	Urban Work of the Year	Nominated	
2013	"Child" - 360; Kaelyn Behr, Matthew Colwell	Urban Work of the Year	Nominated	
2014	"Run Alone" - 360; Kaelyn Behr, Matthew Colwell	Urban Work of the Year	Nominated	
2014	"Live It Up" - 360 (featuring Pez); Kaelyn Behr, Matthew Colwell, Perry Chapman, Dennis Dowlut, Nicholas Martin	Urban Work of the Year	Nominated	
2014	"Price of Fame" – 360 (featuring Gossling); Kaelyn Behr, Matthew Colwell	Urban Work of the Year	Nominated	
2014	"Tear It Down" – The Aston Shuffle; Kaelyn Behr, Mikah Freeman, Vance Musgrove, Amanda Ghost	Dance Work of the Year	Nominated	
2016	"Take Me Over" - Peking Duk (featuring Safia); Kaelyn Behr, Adam Hyde, Reuben Styles, Ben Woolner-Kirkham	Dance Work of the Year	Won	
2016	"Take Me Over" - Peking Duk (featuring Safia); Kaelyn Behr, Adam Hyde, Reuben Styles, Ben Woolner-Kirkham	Most Played Australian Work	Won	
2018	"Peking Duk" – Peking Duk (featuring Elliphant) - Kaelyn Behr, Adam Hyde, Reuben Styles, Elliphant, Daniel Goudie, Ashley Milton	Dance Work of the Year	Won	
2018	"Peking Duk" – Peking Duk (featuring Elliphant) - Kaelyn Behr, Adam Hyde, Reuben Styles, Elliphant, Daniel Goudie, Ashley Milton	Most Played Australian Work	Won	
2018	"Moments" – Bliss n Eso (featuring Gavin James); Kaelyn Behr, Peter James Harding, Max Mackinnon, Nicholas Martin, Jonathan Notley, Ryan Vojtesak	Urban Work of the Year	Nominated	
2019	"Let You Down" – Peking Duk (featuring Icona Pop); Kaelyn Behr, Adam Hyde, Reuben Styles,, Samuel Manville, Robert Taylor	Dance Work of the Year	Nominated	
2020	"Sugar" – Peking Duk (featuring Jack River); Kaelyn Behr, Adam Hyde, Reuben Styles, Holly Rankin, Xavier Dunn, Karsten Dahlgaard, Rene Dif, Claus Norreen, Anders Oeland, Johnny Pedersen, Soren Rasted	Most Performed Dance Work	Nominated	
2020	"Rush" – Troye Sivan; Kaelyn Behr, Troye Sivan, Alex Chapman, Kevin Hickey, Brett McLaughlin, Adam Novodor	APRA Song of the Year	Won	
2026	"Hideaway" - Mallrat (Grace Shaw / Styalz Fuego / Gab Strum)	Most Performed Alternative Work	Nominated	

=== ARIA Awards ===
The ARIA Music Awards, hosted by the Australian Recording Industry Association (ARIA), recognise "excellence and innovation across all genres" of music in Australia.

Year	Nominee / work	Award	Result	Ref.
2012	Styalz Fuego for 360 – Falling & Flying	ARIA Award for Best Producer	Won	
2023	Styalz Fuego for Troye Sivan "Rush"	Best Produced Release	Won	
2023	Styalz Fuego for Troye Sivan "Rush"	Best Engineered Release	Won	
2026	Styalz Fuego for Troye Sivan – "She's the Best"	Best Produced Release	Nominated	
2026	Styalz Fuego for Troye Sivan – "She's the Best"	Best Engineered Release	Nominated	
