= Toshinori Yonekura =

Toshinori Yonekura 米倉利紀
- Born: 米倉利徳, (Yonekura, Toshinori); October 21, 1972 (age 53)
- Origin: Osaka, Japan
- Genres: Pop, R&B
- Occupations: Singer, songwriter, producer, composer, actor
- Years active: 1992–present
- Labels: Geneon Entertainment (1992–2001); Warner Music Group (2001–2007); Universal Music Group (2008)
- Website: toshinoriyonekura.com

Toshinori Yonekura (米倉 利紀, Yonekura Toshinori) born October 21, 1972, is a Japanese singer-songwriter and record producer originally from Toyonaka, Osaka. Known as "Yone" to fans, Toshinori made his major label debut with the single "Mikan no Android" in 1992 on Geneon Entertainment. Aside from his own music career, Yonekura has crafted songs for some of Japan's best known acts such as KinKi Kids, Hiromi Go, Akiko Wada, and SMAP. In 2008, he made his first foray into acting joining the Japanese production of the Broadway musical, Rent.

== Discography ==
=== Albums ===
==== Studio albums ====
List of albums, with selected chart positions
Title	Album details	Peak positions	Certifications
Title	Album details	JPN Oricon	Certifications
Bella Donna	Released: May 25, 1992; Label: Pioneer LDC; Format(s): CD	74	
Liberta	Released: March 25, 1993; Label: Pioneer LDC; Format(s): CD	37	
Passione	Released: October 27, 1993; Label: Pioneer LDC; Format(s): CD	34	
Adesso	Released: July 27, 1994; Label: Pioneer LDC; Format(s): CD	20	
Amore	Released: November 22, 1995; Label: Pioneer LDC; Format(s): CD	23	
Mad Phat Natural Things	Released: October 10, 1996; Label: Pioneer LDC; Format(s): CD	20	
I	Released: January 28, 1998; Label: Pioneer LDC; Format(s): CD, digital download	5	RIAJ: Gold
Flava	Released: February 10, 1999; Label: Pioneer LDC; Format(s): CD	3	
Power	Released: February 23, 2000; Label: Pioneer LDC; Format(s): CD	13	
O	Released: February 15, 2001; Label: Pioneer LDC; Format(s): CD	11	
Roots of Style	Released: March 13, 2002; Label: Warner Music Japan; Format(s): CD, digital download	16	
With You	Released: February 26, 2003; Label: Warner Music Japan; Format(s): CD	20	
Sang My Thang	Released: August 24, 2005; Label: Warner Music Japan; Format(s): CD	29	
Fall Back	Released: August 23, 2006; Label: Warner Music Japan; Format(s): CD	28	
Samurai Quality	Released: September 19, 2007; Label: Warner Music Japan; Format(s): CD, digital download	43	
Sensitive Sources	Released: October 21, 2009; Label: Universal Music Japan; Format(s): CD, digital download	28	
Through You	Released: June 27, 2012; Label: Tokuma Japan; Format(s): CD, digital download	31	
sTYle72	Released: February 13, 2013; Label: Tokuma Japan; Format(s): CD, digital download	41	
Rough Lux	Released: February 12, 2014; Label: Tokuma Japan; Format(s): CD, digital download	15	
Streamline	Released: January 21, 2015; Label: Tokuma Japan; Format(s): CD, digital download	33	
Switch	Released: February 3, 2016; Label: Tokuma Japan; Format(s): CD, digital download	30	
Smoky Rich	Released: February 8, 2017; Label: Tokuma Japan; Format(s): CD, digital download	23	
Analog	Released: January 23, 2019; Label: Tokuma Japan; Format(s): CD, digital download	23	
Pink Elephant	Released: January 22, 2020; Label: Tokuma Japan; Format(s): CD, digital download	22	
Green Giraffe	Released: January 20, 2021; Label: Tokuma Japan; Style72; Format(s): CD, digital download	31	
Purple Penguin	Released: January 26, 2022; Label: Style72; Format(s): CD, digital download	25	
Black Lion	Released: March 1, 2024; Label: Style72; Format(s): CD, digital download	25	
Blue Hippopotamus	Released: May 15, 2024; Label: Style72; Format(s): CD, digital download	22	
Orange Gorilla	Released: February 26, 2025; Label: Style72; Format(s): CD, digital download	41	
Yellow Bear	Released: March 5, 2026; Label: Style72; Format(s): CD, digital download	36	

==== Compilation albums ====
List of albums, with selected chart positions
Title	Album details	Peak positions	Certifications
Title	Album details	JPN Oricon	Certifications
Cool Jamz	Released: March 22, 1995; Label: Pioneer LDC; Format(s): CD	13	
Yone's Body and Soul	Released: September 16, 1998; Label: Pioneer LDC; Format(s): CD	4	RIAJ: Gold
Ballads	Released: June 27, 2001; Label: Pioneer LDC; Format(s): CD	49	
Yone's Body and Soul II	Released: September 27, 2001; Label: Pioneer LDC; Format(s): CD	40	
Single Collection 1992–1996	Released: March 27, 2002; Label: Pioneer LDC; Format(s): CD	—	
Single Collection 1996–2001	Released: March 27, 2002; Label: Pioneer LDC; Format(s): CD	—	
Single Collection Side B 1992–2001	Released: April 24, 2002; Label: Pioneer LDC; Format(s): CD	—	
Best Selection	Released: January 22, 2003; Label: Pioneer LDC; Format(s): CD	—	
Yone's Body and Soul III	Released: October 12, 2005; Label: Warner Music Japan; Format(s): CD	56	
The Ultimate Collection	Released: October 8, 2008; Label: Warner Music Japan; Format(s): CD, digital download	153	
20th Anniversary Best: Requested Tunes	Released: April 25, 2012; Label: Warner Music Japan; Format(s): CD	109	
Besties: Side-A	Released: February 7, 2018; Label: Tokuma Japan; Format(s): CD	36	
Besties: Side-B Plus	Released: February 7, 2018; Label: Tokuma Japan; Format(s): CD	37	

==== Remix albums ====
List of albums, with selected chart positions
Title	Album details	Peak positions
Title	Album details	JPN Oricon
Mad Phat Natural Things Side-B	Released: March 26, 1997; Label: Pioneer LDC; Format(s): CD	96

==== Cover albums ====
List of albums, with selected chart positions
Title	Album details	Peak positions
Title	Album details	JPN Oricon
Utabito	Released: August 26, 2015; Label: Tokuma Japan; Format(s): CD/DVD	36

==== Live albums ====
List of live albums
Title	Details
Gotta Crush on...Volume.Seven 2008 "Here I Am"	Released: July 5, 2008; Label: Self-released; Format(s): CD/DVD

== Extended plays ==
List of EPs, with selected chart positions
Title	Details	Peak positions
Title	Details	JPN Oricon
Sweet Kisses	Released: September 13, 2000; Label: Pioneer LDC; Format(s): CD	12
Gift	Released: November 28, 2001; Label: Warner Music Japan; Format(s): CD	29
Smile Again	Released: June 9, 2004; Label: Warner Music Japan; Format(s): CD	17

=== Singles ===
List of singles, with selected chart positions
Title	Year	Peak chart positions	Album
Title	Year	JPN Oricon	Album
"Mikan no Android"	1992	—	Bella Donna
"Nasty Groove"	1992	73	Non-album single
"Delicacy ni Ame ga Furu"	1992	—	Liberta
"Furerareru to Komaru"	1993	—	Liberta
"Kitto Dekinai Jitto Shinai"	1993	94	Passione
"Gōjō na Kuchibiru"	1994	75	Adesso
"Emergency"	1994	65	Adesso
"Fragile"	1994	37	Non-album single
"Spark"	1995	23	Amore
"Mujaki na Kimi ga Itoshii"	1995	46	Amore
"Aishiteru Aishitenai"	1996	47	Mad Phat Natural Things
"Gotcha!"	1996	59	Mad Phat Natural Things
"We Kept Missing Each Other..."	1996	48	Mad Phat Natural Things
"Yes, I Do." (with Big Horns Bee)	1997	39	I
"Love in the Sky"	1997	29	I
"Nothin' to Lose"	1998	33	Flava
"Tsuki to Taiyō"	1998	37	Flava
"Sore Nari..."	1998	33	Flava
"Keep This Love"	1999	37	Flava
"Good Time"	1999	27	Power
"Do Something Real"	2000	43	Power
"Kiseki (Heart)"	2000	25	O
"Like, Love, Need..."	2001	30	O
"Yokogao"	2001	27	Roots of Style
"Coming Soon"	2002	27	With You
"Manhattan, NY*****"	2003	30	With You
"Jōnetsu Shakunetsu"	2005	27	Sing My Thang
"Whatsoever"	2006	50	Fall Back
"Likable"	2007	39	Samurai Quality
"Hands"	2008	—	Sensitive Sources
"Respect/Disrespect"	2008	Not released on CD	Sensitive Sources
"One to Love (No Question)"	2008	Not released on CD	Sensitive Sources
"Superwoman/Superman"	2009	Not released on CD	Sensitive Sources
"Out of Control"	2010	Not released on CD	Through You
"My Dear Friend"	2010	Not released on CD	Through You
"Suki"	2015	Not released on CD	Rough Lux
"All I Want Is You (Very Merry Christmas)"	2016	Not released on CD	Non-album single
