= She Don't Need to Know =

2025 single by the Kid Laroi

Single by The Kid Laroi
- Released: 29 August 2025
- Length: 2:30
- Label: Columbia
- Songwriters: Charlton Howard; Jon Bellion; Rogét Chahayed; Jason Cornet; Alexander Izquierdo; Pete Nappi; Antonio Zito
- Producers: Jon Bellion; Rogét Chahayed; Pete Nappi; Tenroc; Antonio Zito

The Kid Laroi singles chronology
"Lost" (2025)	"She Don't Need to Know" (2025)	"A Cold Play" (2025)

Music video
- "She Don't Need to Know" on YouTube

"She Don't Need to Know" is a song by Australian rapper and singer the Kid Laroi, released on 29 August 2025 through Columbia Records.

== Music video ==
The music video premiered on its day of release, directed by Danica Arias Kleinknecht, it stars Carmen Electra and Anna Van Patten. At the 2026 AACTA Awards, it was nominated for Audience Choice Award for Favourite Australian Music Video.

== Reception ==
Rosheen Ansari from New Wave Magazine said "Laroi blends the lines between pop and rap with this track" adding "The song follows a smooth melody with scandalous lyrics describing a love triangle – stepping away from the deeper expressive hits about romance and into a more contemporary pop sound.

Reagan Denning from Melodic Magazine said the Kid Laroi "sharpens his signature sound" on the single, calling it a "rich, immersive pop song".

== Charts ==
Chart performance for "She Don't Need to Know"
Chart (2025)	Peak position
Australian Artist (ARIA)	7
New Zealand Hot Singles (RMNZ)	7
