= A Cold Play =

2025 single by the Kid Laroi

Single by the Kid Laroi

from the album Before I Forget
- Released: 5 September 2025
- Length: 2:59
- Label: Columbia
- Songwriter: Charlton Howard
- Producer: KBeazy

The Kid Laroi singles chronology
"She Don't Need to Know" (2025)	"A Cold Play" (2025)	"A Perfect World" (2025)

Music video
- "A Cold Play" on YouTube

"A Cold Play" (stylised in all-caps) is a song by Australian rapper and singer the Kid Laroi, released on 5 September 2025 through Columbia Records. His fifth single of 2025, it serves as the lead single from his second studio album, Before I Forget (2026), after an initial version of the record was scrapped. The lyric reveal his "wishing he could fix someone" with fans speculating the song is about Tate McRae, with whom the artist split in July 2025. Three weeks later, McRae issued her response track titled "Tit for Tat".

"A Cold Play" was voted in at number 72 on the 2025 Triple J Hottest 100.

At the 2026 ARIA Music Awards, it was nominated for Song of the Year.

== Music video ==
The music video was directed by Alex Lill and premiered on 27 September 2025. It is a one-take video, slowly zooming out on a crying Kid Laroi. At the 2026 AACTA Awards, it was nominated for Audience Choice Award for Favourite Australian Music Video.

== Reception ==
Lauren McNamara from Rolling Stone Australia said the "single finds him at his most emotionally vulnerable yet, delivering heartfelt lyrics over another earworm hook".

== Charts ==
Weekly chart performance for "A Cold Play"
Chart (2025–2026)	Peak position
Australia (ARIA)	53
Canada Hot 100 (Billboard)	81
Czech Republic Airplay (ČNS IFPI)	8
New Zealand Hot Singles (RMNZ)	5
US Bubbling Under Hot 100 (Billboard)	2

Year-end chart performance for "A Cold Play"
Chart (2025)	Position
Australian Artist (ARIA)	39
