= Reprisal (EP) =

EP by Peking Duk
- Released: 11 May 2018
- Length: 8:26
- Label: Sony Australia
- Producers: Peking Duk; Sam Littlemore

Peking Duk chronology
Songs to Sweat To (2015)	Reprisal (2018)	Paradise (2026)

Singles from Reprisal
- 1. "Fire" Released: 11 May 2018

Reprisal is the second extended play by Australian electronic music duo Peking Duk, featuring two tracks: "Fire" and "Distant Arizona". The EP was released on 18 May 2018 and has peaked at number 12 on the Australian ARIA Singles Chart. "Fire" includes uncredited vocals from Melbourne songwriter Sarah Aarons, and was released to radio on 11 May 2018. Sales of "Fire" counted towards the EP's chart placement.

Inspired by spaghetti westerns and Quentin Tarantino, and by director-producer Ryan Sauer, the two songs combine to form "Reprisal"; a tale of vengeance and retribution.

== Reception ==
auspOp said: "'Fire' is undoubtedly the most commercial of the two and is primed for commercial radio airplay", adding "'Distant Arizona' is a slightly grittier electronic piece, with Alister from Cloud Control providing the vocals." The website also called the project "seriously impressive".

== Track listing ==
Digital download
No.	Title	Writer(s)	Producer(s)	Length
1.	"Fire" (featuring Sarah Aarons)	Adam Hyde; Reuben Styles; Sam Littlemore	Hyde; Styles; Littlemore	3:46
2.	"Distant Arizona" (featuring Cloud Control)	Hyde; Styles; Alister Wright	Hyde; Styles	4:40
Total length:				8:26

== Charts ==
=== Weekly charts ===
Chart (2018)	Peak position
Australia (ARIA)	12

=== Year-end charts ===
Chart (2018)	Position
Australia (ARIA)	52
Australian Artist (ARIA)	5
Chart (2019)	Position
Australian Artist (ARIA)	24

== Certifications ==
Region	Certification	Certified units/sales
Australia (ARIA)	5× Platinum	350,000^{‡}
^{‡} Sales+streaming figures based on certification alone.

== Release history ==
Region	Date	Format	Label
Australia	11 May 2018	Digital download; streaming	Sony Music Australia
