= Fall Back =

- This is also the cover art for the song "Selfish Game"

Single by Lithe

from the album What Would You Do?
- Released: 21 March 2024
- Genre: Trap
- Length: 2:51
- Label: Gyrostream (GSL)
- Songwriters: Josiah Ramel; Navraj Singh Goraya (second version only); Tione Jayden Merritt (third version only); Omid Khasrawy
- Producer: Lithe

Lithe singles chronology
"Slide by Me" (2024)	"Fall Back" / "Selfish Game" (2024)	"For You" (2024)

Nav singles chronology
"6AM Thoughts" (2024)	"Fall Back" (2024)	"Real Me" (2025)

Lil Tjay singles chronology
"Fed Up" (2024)	"Fall Back" (2024)	"Step Up" (2024)

Visualizer
- "Fall Back" on YouTube

"Fall Back" is a song by Australian singer Lithe. It was released on 21 March 2024 through Gyrostream (GSL) as the lead single from his fourth extended play, What Would You Do?, alongside another single, "Selfish Game". Both singles were solely produced by Lithe himself, who wrote them alongside Omid Khasrawy.

A second version of the song features Canadian rapper Nav and was released on 16 August 2024. A third version features American rapper Lil Tjay and was released 6 September 2024.

At the 2024 ARIA Music Awards, the song was nominated for Song of the Year and Best Hip Hop/Rap Release.

At the APRA Music Awards of 2025, the song won Most Performed Hip Hop / Rap Work.

== Charts ==
=== Weekly charts ===
Chart performance for "Fall Back"
Chart (2024)	Peak position
Australia (ARIA)	56
Australia Hip Hop/R&B (ARIA)	1
Austria (Ö3 Austria Top 40)	27
Canada Hot 100 (Billboard)	62
France (SNEP)	108
Germany (GfK)	28
Greece International (IFPI)	9
Ireland (IRMA)	64
Netherlands (Single Top 100)	91
Portugal (AFP)	81
Switzerland (Schweizer Hitparade)	21
UK Singles (OCC)	58
UK Hip Hop/R&B (OCC)	20
US Bubbling Under Hot 100 Singles (Billboard)	6
US Hot R&B/Hip-Hop Songs (Billboard)	36

=== Year-end charts ===
2024 year-end chart performance for "Fall Back"
Chart (2024)	Position
Australian Artist (ARIA)	31

== Certifications ==
Region	Certification	Certified units/sales
Australia (ARIA)	Platinum	70,000^{‡}
France (SNEP) featuring Lil Tjay	Gold	100,000^{‡}
Streaming
Greece (IFPI Greece)	Platinum	2,000,000^{†}
^{‡} Sales+streaming figures based on certification alone.^{†} Streaming-only figures based on certification alone.
