= Adam Hyde =

Australian musician

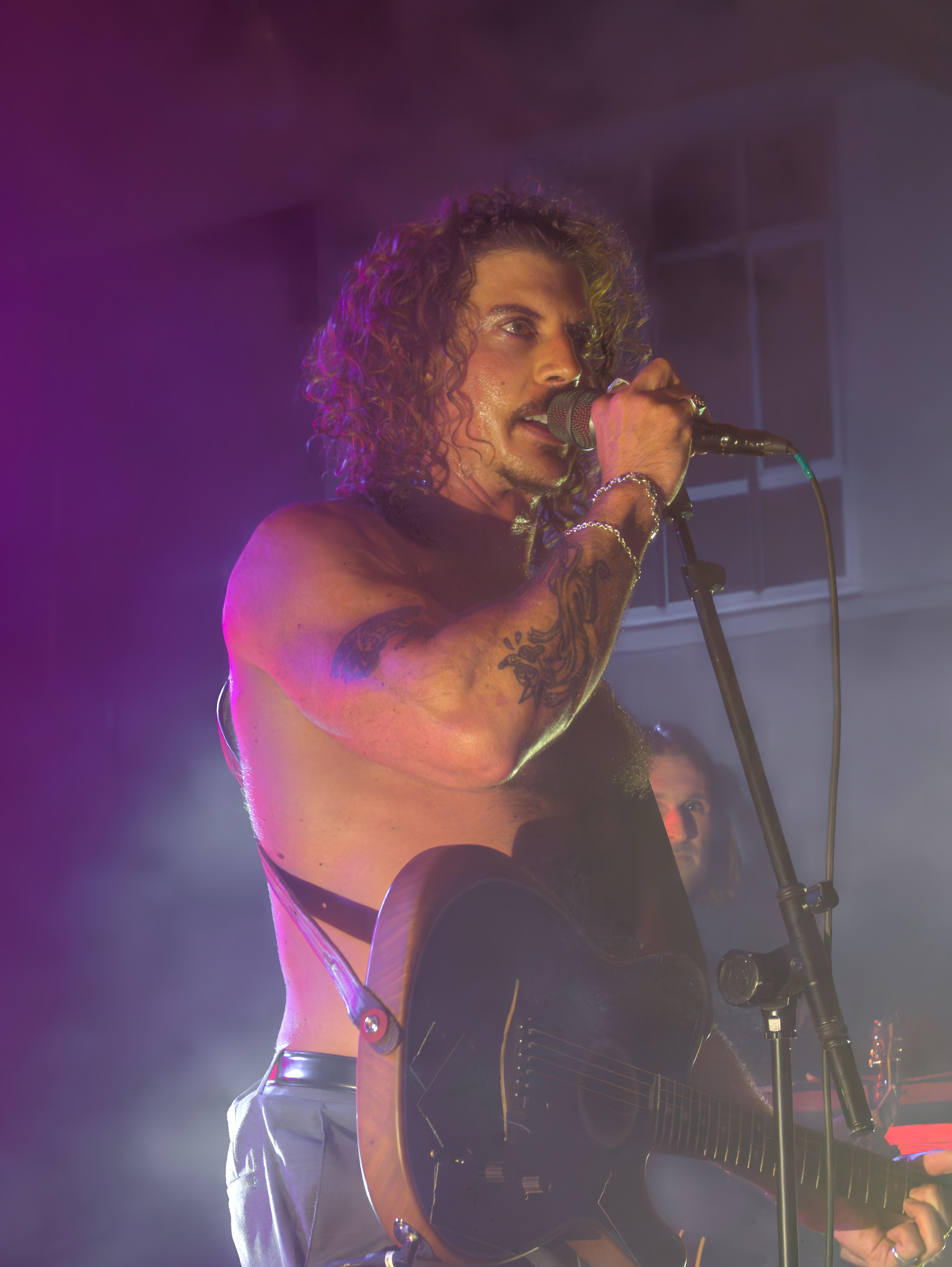
- Hyde performing in February 2026

Background information
- Also known as: Keli Holiday
- Born: 23 February 1991 (age 35)
- Occupations: Musician; singer; songwriter; DJ; record producer
- Years active: 2010–present
- Member of: Peking Duk
- Partner: Abbie Chatfield (2024–present)

Adam Hyde (born 23 February 1991) is an Australian musician. He was raised in Canberra. He is best known as one half of Peking Duk. Since 2021, Hyde has released music under the alias Keli Holiday, an alter ego Hyde describes as "a very confused, heartbroken man that still thinks he's the shit."

== Career ==
=== Peking Duk ===
In 2010, Hyde formed the electronic duo Peking Duk alongside Reuben Styles. Their debut single was "Bingo Trippin'" in 2011. Over the next ten years, the duo released three ARIA top ten singles and won AIR, APRA and ARIA Music Awards.

=== 2021–present: Keli Holiday ===
In October 2021, "December" was released as the debut single by Keli Holiday.

In April 2022, Keli Holiday released the debut album Keli.

In May 2024, Keli Holiday released the debut EP Jesterman.

At the 2025 Rolling Stone Australia Awards, Keli Holiday won the Rolling Stone Readers Award.

In August 2025, Keli Holiday released "Dancing2", the lead single from his second studio album. Hyde said "This album feels like the first Keli Holiday offering that is true to who I am. It explores themes of longing for more, finding love in a crowded room, and the union of sex. I have spent the majority of my days since the birth of Keli Holiday focusing on what I want to say, how I want to say it, and what I want it to sound like." It came second in the 2025 Triple J Hottest 100.

On 7 November 2025, Keli Holiday released "Ecstasy" and announced the forthcoming release of Capital Fiction. Capital Fiction was released in February 2026 and peaked at number 3 on the ARIA Charts.

In October 2026, Keli Holiday released "Love Was a Stranger".

== Personal life ==
As of 2024, Hyde is in a relationship with Abbie Chatfield. In 2024, Hyde was diagnosed with skin cancer.

In May 2026, Hyde was refused re-entry into the United States, he was detained at the Canadian border following this refusal. United States Customs and Border Protection stated that the refusal was due to "national security concerns".

== Discography ==
=== Albums ===
List of albums, with selected details
Title	Details	Peak chart positions
Title	Details	AUS
Keli	Released: April 2022; Label: Adam Hyde; Format: Digital	—
Capital Fiction	Released: 13 February 2026; Label: Keli Holiday; Format: CD, LP, digital	3

=== Extended plays ===
List of EPs, with selected details
Title	Details
Jesterman	Released: May 2024; Label: Keli Holiday; Format: Digital

=== Charting singles ===
List of charting singles, with selected chart positions
Title	Year	Peak chart positions		Album
Title	Year	AUS	NZ Hot	Album
"Dancing2"	2025	24	7	Capital Fiction

== Awards and nominations ==
=== AIR Awards ===
The Australian Independent Record Awards (commonly known informally as AIR Awards) is an annual awards night to recognise, promote and celebrate the success of Australia's Independent Music sector.

Year	Nominee / work	Award	Result	Ref.
2026	"Dancing2"	Independent Song of the Year	Nominated	

=== APRA Awards ===
Since 1982 the APRA Awards are run by Australian Performing Right Association to recognise songwriting skills, sales and airplay performance by its members annually.

Year	Nominee / work	Award	Result	Ref.
2015	"High" (Peking Duk featuring Nicole Millar) (Adam Hyde, Reuben Styles, Nicole Millar & Sam Littlemore)	Song of the Year	Shortlisted	
2015	"High" (Peking Duk featuring Nicole Millar) (Adam Hyde, Reuben Styles, Nicole Millar & Sam Littlemore)	Dance Work of the Year	Nominated	
2016	"Take Me Over" (Peking Duk featuring Safia) (Adam Hyde, Reuben Styles, Kaelyn Behr, Ben Woolner-Kirkham	Most Played Australian Work	Won	
2016	"Take Me Over" (Peking Duk featuring Safia) (Adam Hyde, Reuben Styles, Kaelyn Behr, Ben Woolner-Kirkham	Dance Work of the Year	Won	
2018	"Stranger" (Peking Duk featuring Elliphant); Adam Hyde, Reuben Styles, Kaelyn Behr, Elliphant, Daniel Goudie, Ashley Milton	Dance Work of the Year	Won	
2018	"Stranger" (Peking Duk featuring Elliphant); Adam Hyde, Reuben Styles, Kaelyn Behr, Elliphant, Daniel Goudie, Ashley Milton	Most Played Australian Work	Won	
2018	"Fake Magic" (Peking Duk featuring AlunaGeorge) (Adam Hyde, Reuben Styles, Sam Littlemore, Laura Lowther, Frances Dewji, George Reid)	Dance Work of the Year	Nominated	
2019	"Let You Down" (Peking Duk featuring Icona Pop) (Adam Hyde, Reuben Styles, Kaelyn Behr, Sam Manville, Robert Tailor)	Dance Work of the Year	Nominated	
2020	"Sugar" (Peking Duk featuring Jack River) (Kaelyn Behr, Adam Hyde, Reuben Styles)	Most Performed Dance Work of the Year	Nominated	
2022	"Nothing to Love About Love" (Peking Duk featuring The Wombats) (Adam Hyde, Reuben Styles, Matthew Murphy, Tyler Spry)	Most Performed Dance/Electronic Work	Nominated	
2023	"Honest" (Peking Duk featuring Slayyyter) (Adam Hyde, Reuben Styles, Kirsty Peters)	Most Performed Dance/Electronic Work	Nominated	
2024	"Spend It!" (Peking Duk featuring Circa Waves) (Adam Hyde, Reuben Styles, Circa Waves, Johan Gustafsson, Kieran Shudhall, Gustav Gallhagan, Jackson Brazier, Sam Littlemore)	Most Performed Dance/Electronic Work	Nominated	
2026	"Dancing2" (Adam Hyde, Alex Cameron, Konstantin Kersting)	Song of the Year	Nominated	
2026	"Dancing2" (Adam Hyde, Alex Cameron, Konstantin Kersting)	Most Performed Alternative Work	Nominated	

=== ARIA Music Awards ===
The ARIA Music Awards is an annual awards ceremony that recognises excellence, innovation, and achievement across all genres of Australian music. They commenced in 1987.

Year	Nominee / work	Award	Result	Ref.
2025	Ryan Sauer for Keli Holiday – "Dancing2"	Best Video	Won	
2026	"Dancing2"	Song of the Year	Nominated	

=== NSW Music Prize ===
The NSW Music Prize aims to "celebrate, support and incentivise" the NSW's most talented artists, with "the aim of inspiring the next generations of stars". It commenced in 2025.

Year	Nominee / work	Award	Result	Ref.
2026	Capital Fiction	NSW Music Prize	Nominated	
2026	Keli Holiday	NSW Breakthrough Artist of the Year	Nominated	

=== Rolling Stone Australia Awards ===
The Rolling Stone Australia Awards are awarded annually in January or February by the Australian edition of Rolling Stone magazine for outstanding contributions to popular culture in the previous year.

Year	Nominee / work	Award	Result	Ref.
2025	Keli Holiday	Rolling Stone Readers Award	Won	
