= G Flip discography =

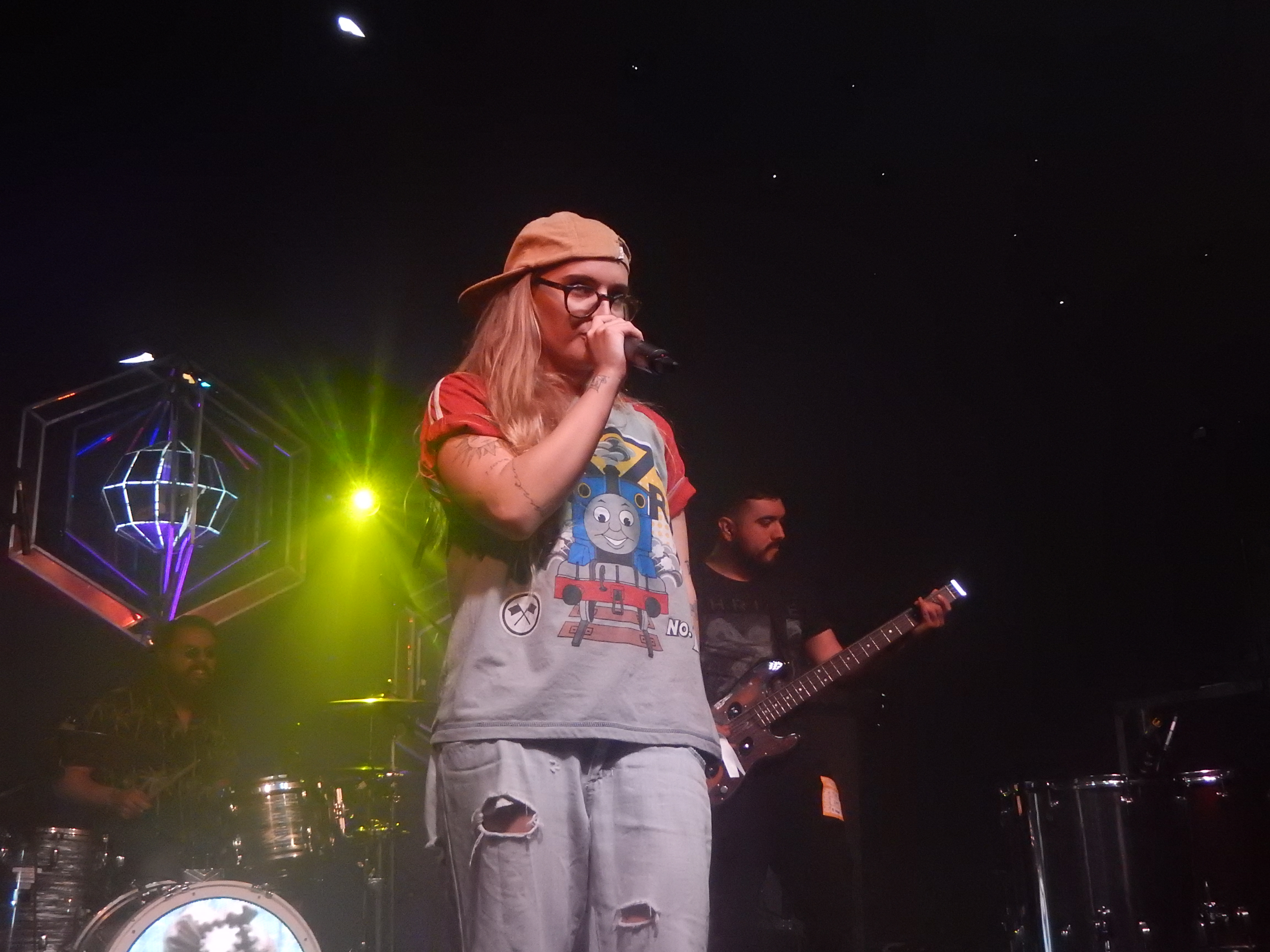
- G Flip in 2018
- Studio albums: 3
- Singles: 27

Australian singer G Flip has released three studio albums, 27 singles, including two as a featured artist.

G Flip released their debut single "About You" in March 2018, after uploading it onto triple J Unearthed the month prior. Their second album Drummer debuted at number one on the ARIA Charts in August 2023.

G Flip self-released their third album Dream Ride on 5 September 2025.

== Studio albums ==
List of studio albums, with release date, label, and selected chart positions, shown
| Title | Details | Peak chart positions |
| Title | Details | AUS |
|---|---|---|
| About Us | Released: 30 August 2019; Formats: CD, LP, digital download, streaming; Label: Future Classic (FCL275) | 6 |
| Drummer | Released: 11 August 2023; Formats: CD, LP, digital download, streaming; Label: Future Classic (FCL594) | 1 |
| Dream Ride | Released: 5 September 2025; Formats: CD, LP, digital download, streaming; Label: AWAL (GFLIP01CD) | 4 |

== Singles ==
=== As lead artist ===
List of singles, with year released, selected chart positions, certifications, and album name shown
| Title | Year | Peak chart positions | | | | | | Certifications | Album |
| Title | Year | AUS | IRE | NZ Hot | UK | US Rock | Triple J Hot | Certifications | Album |
|---|---|---|---|---|---|---|---|---|---|
| "About You" | 2018 | — | — | — | — | — | 38 | ARIA: Platinum | About Us |
| "Killing My Time" | 2018 | 79 | — | — | — | — | 62 | ARIA: Platinum | About Us |
| "Bring Me Home" | 2019 | — | — | — | — | — | 129 | ARIA: Gold | About Us |
| "Drink Too Much" | 2019 | 72 | — | — | — | — | 6 | ARIA: 2× Platinum | About Us |
| "I Am Not Afraid" | 2019 | — | — | — | — | — | 77 | ARIA: Gold | About Us |
| "Stupid" | 2019 | — | — | — | — | — | 66 | | About Us |
| "Lady Marmalade" (Triple J Like a Version) | 2020 | — | — | — | — | — | 78 | | Non-album singles |
| "Hyperfine" | 2020 | 88 | — | — | — | — | 7 | ARIA: Platinum | Non-album singles |
| "You & I" | 2020 | — (Note: "You & I" did not enter the ARIA Top 100 Singles Chart, but peaked at number 4 on the Australian Independent Label Singles.) | — | — | — | — | 44 | | Non-album singles |
| "I'd Rather Go to Bed" | 2020 | — (Note: "I'd Rather Go to Bed" did not enter the ARIA Top 100 Singles Chart, but peaked at number 11 on the Australian Independent Label Singles.) | — | — | — | — | — | | Non-album singles |
| "Queen" (featuring Mxmtoon) | 2021 | — | — | — | — | — | 64 | | Non-album singles |
| "Not Even in Vegas" (featuring Thomas Headon) | 2021 | — | — | — | — | — | — | | Non-album singles |
| "Boys & Girls" (with Filous) | 2021 | — | — | — | — | — | — | | A Producer from Vienna |
| "Waiting Game" (with Renforshort) | 2021 | — (Note: "Waiting Game" did not enter the ARIA Top 100 Singles Chart, but peaked at number 16 on the Australian Independent Label Singles.) | — | — | — | — | 184 | | Non-album singles |
| "Scream" (featuring Upsahl) | 2021 | — (Note: "Scream" did not enter the ARIA Top 100 Singles Chart, but peaked at number 13 on the Australian Independent Label Singles.) | — | — | — | — | 149 | | Non-album singles |
| "Gay 4 Me" (featuring Lauren Sanderson) | 2022 | — (Note: "Gay 4 Me" did not enter the ARIA Top 100 Singles Chart, but peaked at number 11 on the Australian Independent Label Singles.) | — | 27 | — | — | 11 | | Non-album singles |
| "Get Me Outta Here" | 2022 | — | — | — | — | — | 109 | | Non-album singles |
| "Waste of Space" | 2022 | — (Note: "Waste of Space" did not enter the ARIA Top 100 Singles Chart, but peaked at number 16 on the Australian Independent Label Singles.) | — | — | — | — | 96 | | Non-album singles |
| "Be Your Man" | 2023 | — (Note: "Be Your Man" did not enter the ARIA Top 100 Singles Chart, but peaked at number 7 on the Australian Independent Label Singles.) | — | 23 | — | — | 22 | | Drummer |
| "The Worst Person Alive" | 2023 | 81 | — | 29 | — | — | 2 | | Drummer |
| "Good Enough" | 2023 | — | — | 37 | — | — | 24 | | Drummer |
| "Australia" | 2023 | — (Note: "Australia" did not enter the ARIA Top 100 Singles Chart, but peaked at number 32 on the ARIA Digital Track Chart.) | — | — | — | — | 50 | | Drummer |
| "Cruel Summer" (Like a Version) | 2024 | 96 | — | 17 | — | — | 9 | | Non-album single (Note: Later included on the 2025 compilation Triple J's Best Australian Like a Version) |
| "Disco Cowgirl" | 2025 | — | — | — | — | — | 23 | | Dream Ride |
| "Big Ol' Hammer" | 2025 | — | — | — | — | — | — | | Dream Ride |
| "In Another Life" | 2025 | — | — | — | — | — | 50 | | Dream Ride |
| "Bed on Fire" | 2025 | 28 | 97 | 34 | 91 | 46 | 74 | ARIA: Gold | Dream Ride |
| "Lez Go!" (with The Beaches) | 2026 | — | — | — | — | — | — | | TBA |

=== As featured artist ===
List of singles, with year released, selected chart positions, certifications, and album name shown
| Title | Year | Peak chart positions | Album |
| Title | Year | AUS | Album |
|---|---|---|---|
| "Loose Ends" (Illy featuring G Flip) | 2020 | — (Note: "Loose Ends" did not enter the ARIA Singles Chart, but did peak at number 4 on the ARIA Top 20 Australian Hip Hop/R&B Singles Chart.) | The Space Between |
| "My Mind" (Baker Boy featuring G Flip) | 2021 | — | Gela |

=== Promotional singles ===
List of promotional singles
| Title | Year | Label |
|---|---|---|
| "Gay for Me" (featuring Lauren Sanderson)/"Kiwi" | 2022 | Spotify Singles |
| "Christmas (Baby, Please Come Home)" | 2023 | Apple Music |
| "All Fired Up" | 2026 | Paramount+ |

== Other certified songs ==
List of other certified songs
| Title | Year | Certifications | Album |
|---|---|---|---|
| "Lover" | 2019 | ARIA: Gold | About Us |

== Album appearances ==
List of album appearances by G Flip
| Title | Year | Album |
|---|---|---|
| "Unapologetic" (acoustic) | 2020 | Bonds Bloody Comfy Period Undies |
| "Roar" | 2021 | Back to the Outback |
| "About You" (with Thrupence and Jack Vanzet) | 2023 | Future Classic: Recomposed |
