= Triple J's Hottest 100 of 2023 =

Australian popular music countdown

2023 Triple J Hottest 100

Countdown details
- Date of countdown: 27 January 2024
- Charity partner: Headspace
- Votes cast: 2,355,870

Countdown highlights
- Winning song: Doja Cat "Paint the Town Red"
- Most entries: G Flip (7 tracks)

Chronology
← Previous; 2023 (Like a Version)	Next → 2024

The 2023 Triple J Hottest 100 was announced on 27 January 2024. It was the 31st annual countdown of the most popular songs of the year, as voted for by listeners of Australian youth radio station Triple J. The day after, the Hottest 200 was broadcast, counting down songs 200–101. Merchandise sales from the event support youth mental health organisation Headspace.

American rapper and singer Doja Cat's song "Paint the Town Red" was voted into number one, while Australian musician G Flip scored the most entries, with seven, a record for the most entries in a single Triple J Hottest 100 countdown, previously held by Wolfmother for 18 years and equalled by Spacey Jane the year prior. Their highest entry was "The Worst Person Alive", which placed at number two. Over 2.3 million votes were counted.

== Background ==
The 2022 Triple J Hottest 100 culminated with "Say Nothing" by Australian musicians Flume and May-a reaching number one. Meanwhile, Spacey Jane had the most songs in the countdown with six, including a record-breaking three in the top six.

Any songs released between 1 December 2022 and 30 November 2023 are eligible for the 2023 Hottest 100. Listeners can vote for up to ten songs via the Triple J website. Voting opened on 12 December 2023, and closed on 22 January 2024.

== Projections ==
Various publications reported on the findings of Hottest 100 prediction website 100 Warm Tunas, which has predicted the countdown's number one song with 67% accuracy since 2016. On 9 January 2024, it predicted the winner would be "Not Strong Enough" by American indie group Boygenius, which placed at number 30. Other strong contenders were "Rush" by Australian singer Troye Sivan (placed at number 8), "Rumble" by American producer Skrillex and British producers Fred Again and Flowdan (placed at number 12), "Leaving the Light" by Ghanaian-Australian singer Genesis Owusu (placed at number 69), and "What Was I Made For?" by American singer Billie Eilish (placed at number 7). Meanwhile, men's magazine GQ published its list of predictions, with "Paint the Town Red" by American singer Doja Cat at number one (which topped the countdown), followed by "Rhyme Dust" by producers MK and Dom Dolla (placed at number 4).

On 11 January 2024, Triple J announced that there was just one vote splitting two tracks in the top five, and that a musician who debuted in the 2022 countdown was projected with three tracks in the 2023 countdown.

== Full list ==
Note: Australian artists

#	Song	Artist	Country of origin
1	Paint the Town Red	Doja Cat	United States
2	The Worst Person Alive	G Flip	Australia
3	Saving Up	Dom Dolla	Australia
4	Rhyme Dust	MK and Dom Dolla	United States/Australia
5	Prada	Cassö, Raye and D-Block Europe	United Kingdom
6	Adore U	Fred Again and Obongjayar	United Kingdom/Nigeria
7	What Was I Made For?	Billie Eilish	United States
8	Rush	Troye Sivan	Australia/South Africa
9	Lovin on Me	Jack Harlow	United States
10	Chemical	Post Malone	United States
11	Vampire	Olivia Rodrigo	United States
12	Rumble	Skrillex, Fred Again and Flowdan	United States/United Kingdom
13	Kill Bill	SZA	United States
14	Atmosphere	Fisher and Kita Alexander	Australia
15	(It Goes Like) Nanana	Peggy Gou	South Korea
16	Sprinter	Dave and Central Cee	United Kingdom
17	Back on 74	Jungle	United Kingdom
18	Eat Your Man	Dom Dolla and Nelly Furtado	Australia/Canada
19	Therapy	Budjerah	Australia
20	Sorry Instead	Spacey Jane	Australia
21	Greedy	Tate McRae	Canada
22	Be Your Man	G Flip	Australia
23	Take It Off	Fisher and Aatig	Australia/Latvia
24	Good Enough	G Flip	Australia
25	Rich Baby Daddy	Drake featuring Sexyy Red and SZA	Canada/United States
26	Rough	G Flip	Australia
27	Imposter Syndrome	Lime Cordiale	Australia
28	Dance the Night	Dua Lipa	United Kingdom/Albania
29	Say Yes to Heaven	Lana Del Rey	United States
30	Not Strong Enough	Boygenius	United States
31	One of Your Girls	Troye Sivan	Australia/South Africa
32	Bad Idea Right?	Olivia Rodrigo	United States
33	Got Me Started	Troye Sivan	Australia/South Africa
34	Get Him Back!	Olivia Rodrigo	United States
35	Baby Again..	Fred Again, Skrillex and Four Tet	United Kingdom/United States
36	Boy's a Liar Pt. 2	PinkPantheress and Ice Spice	United Kingdom/United States
37	Laced Up	Hilltop Hoods	Australia
38	Minivan	The Rions	Australia
39	Green Honda	Benee	New Zealand
40	Scary Movies	The Rions	Australia
41	Houdini	Dua Lipa	United Kingdom/Albania
42	Pedestal	Lime Cordiale	Australia
43	Popular	The Weeknd, Playboi Carti and Madonna	Canada/United States
44	My Love Mine All Mine	Mitski	United States/Japan
45	Still Have Room	Hockey Dad	Australia
46	Strangers	Kenya Grace	United Kingdom/South Africa
47	Sweetheart	Old Mervs	Australia
48	Padam Padam	Kylie Minogue	Australia
49	Agora Hills	Doja Cat	United States
50	Australia	G Flip	Australia
51	Ten	Fred Again and Jozzy	United Kingdom/United States
52	I Used to Be Fun	Teen Jesus and the Jean Teasers	Australia
53	Lookin' Out	King Stingray	Australia
54	More Than You Know	Blink-182	United States
55	We Don't Talk About It	Thelma Plum	Australia
56	All-American Bitch	Olivia Rodrigo	United States
57	Darkside	Bring Me the Horizon	United Kingdom
58	Lost	Bring Me the Horizon	United Kingdom
59	Spin Me Like Your Records	Pacific Avenue	Australia
60	A&W	Lana Del Rey	United States
61	Love Again	The Kid Laroi	Australia
62	Dogtooth	Tyler, the Creator	United States
63	Perfect for You	Peach PRC	Australia
64	Fall at Your Feet (Like a Version)	Peking Duk featuring Julia Stone	Australia
65	Real Life	G Flip	Australia
66	Barbie World	Nicki Minaj, Ice Spice and Aqua	Trinidad and Tobago/United States/Denmark
67	Letting Go	Angie McMahon	Australia
68	F U Goodbye	Peach PRC	Australia
69	Leaving the Light	Genesis Owusu	Australia/Ghana
70	Snooze	SZA	United States
71	Take What You Want	The Rions	Australia
72	Stockholm	Dice	Australia
73	Water	Tyla	South Africa
74	Speedracer	Teenage Dads	Australia
75	Nobody Gets Me	SZA	United States
76	Sofa King	Royel Otis	Australia
77	I Don't Wanna Be Like You	Ruel	United Kingdom/Australia
78	Bleed	The Kid Laroi	Australia
79	Video Killed the Radio Star (Like a Version)	Teenage Dads	Australia
80	7 Days	G Flip	Australia
81	Like a Girl Does	Peach PRC	Australia
82	Exes	Tate McRae	Canada
83	The Summoning	Sleep Token	United Kingdom
84	Trippin Up	The Jungle Giants	Australia
85	Glue Song	Beabadoobee	Philippines/United Kingdom
86	Never Felt So Alone	Labrinth	United Kingdom
87	Fine Day Anthem	Skrillex and Boys Noize	United States/Germany
88	Midnight Driving	Teenage Dads	Australia
89	Nothing Matters	The Last Dinner Party	United Kingdom
90	Nightmare	Polaris	Australia
91	Did You Know That There's a Tunnel Under Ocean Blvd	Lana Del Rey	United States
92	Strawberry Daydream	Pacific Avenue	Australia
93	No Bad Days	The Terrys	Australia
94	Sweat You Out My System	May-a	Australia
95	Welcome to the DCC	Nothing But Thieves	United Kingdom
96	Boys Light Up	Chillinit	Australia
97	Stay Blessed	Genesis Owusu	Australia/Ghana
98	Cool About It	Boygenius	United States
99	I Miss You (Like a Version)	Slowly Slowly	Australia
100	Lost the Breakup	Maisie Peters	United Kingdom

=== #101–200 list ===
On 29 January 2024, Triple J announced the songs that made the #101–200 positions.

#	Song	Artist	Country of origin
101	Blame Brett	The Beaches	Canada
102	Mona Lisa	Dominic Fike	United States
103	Hopscotch	The Terrys	Australia
104	Good Mood	The Rubens	Australia
105	Something in the Way (Like a Version)	Rüfüs Du Sol	Australia
106	Op Shop Lover	Grentperez and Lime Cordiale	Australia
107	Mrs. Hollywood	Go-Jo	Australia
108	Am I Dreaming	Metro Boomin, ASAP Rocky and Roisee	United States
109	Deli	Ice Spice	United States
110	Going Kokomo	Royel Otis	Australia
111	It's Hell Down Here	The Amity Affliction	Australia
112	Gila Monster	King Gizzard & the Lizard Wizard	Australia
113	First Person Shooter	Drake featuring J. Cole	Canada/United States
114	Ratata	Skrillex, Missy Elliott and Mr. Oizo	United States/France
115	The Way Things Go	Beabadoobee	United Kingdom
116	Alive!	Bakar	United Kingdom
117	Fein	Travis Scott featuring Playboi Carti	United States
118	Gorilla	Little Simz	United Kingdom
119	Wings of Time	Tame Impala	Australia
120	Mourning	Post Malone	United States
121	From the Start	Laufey	Iceland
122	Love from the Other Side	Fall Out Boy	United States
123	Bootleg Firecracker	Middle Kids	Australia
124	Running Out of Time	Paramore	United States
125	Blue Eyed Boy	Trophy Eyes	Australia
126	If We Ever Broke Up	Mae Stephens	United Kingdom
127	Moonlight	Kali Uchis	United States
128	Anti-Hero (Like a Version)	Pendulum	Australia
129	All My Life	Lil Durk featuring J. Cole	United States
130	Dancing Queen (Like a Version)	Pacific Avenue	Australia
131	Iris (Like a Version)	Luca Brasi featuring Eaglemont	Australia
132	Body Better	Maisie Peters	United Kingdom
133	Hey	Old Mervs	Australia
134	Drive Me Crazy!	Lil Yachty	United States
135	Ballad of a Homeschooled Girl	Olivia Rodrigo	United States
136	Hand In My Pocket (Like a Version)	The Smith Street Band	Australia
137	Lost Without You	San Cisco	Australia
138	Flesh	Golden Features	Australia
139	Ever	The Vanns	Australia
140	Too Much	The Kid Laroi, Jung Kook and Central Cee	Australia/South Korea/United Kingdom
141	I Know It Won't Work	Gracie Abrams	United States
142	Rhinestone 1.7.2 [2018 Export Wav]	Flume featuring Isabella Manfredi	Australia
143	I Want You	The Buoys	Australia
144	Low	SZA	United States
145	UK Rap	Dave and Central Cee	United Kingdom
146	Rhythms	Beddy Rays	Australia
147	Must Be Nice	Ruel	Australia
148	Overdrive	Post Malone	United States
149	Candy Apple	Teenage Joans	Australia
150	Highlands	Middle Kids	Australia
151	Fried Rice	Royel Otis	Australia
152	Be Like You	Dune Rats	Australia
153	I Wanna Dance With You	Royel Otis	Australia
154	Now U Do	DJ Seinfeld and Confidence Man	Sweden/Australia
155	Brain Freeze	Northeast Party House	Australia
156	I've Been In Love	Jungle featuring Channel Tres	United Kingdom/United States
157	Too Much (is Too Much)	Beddy Rays	Australia
158	Everytime We Touch (Like a Version)	Peach PRC	Australia
159	IDGAF	Drake featuring Yeat	Canada/United States
160	Inhumane	Polaris	Australia
161	Amen!	Bring Me the Horizon featuring Lil Uzi Vert and Daryl Palumbo	United Kingdom/United States
162	Candle Flame	Jungle featuring Erick the Architect	United Kingdom/United States
163	Fading Like a Picture	DMA's	Australia
164	Under the Light	San Cisco	Australia
165	Die 4 Me	Halsey	United States
166	Dramamine	Middle Kids	Australia
167	Barmy	Adam Newling	Australia
168	Dancing in the Courthouse	Dominic Fike	United States
169	Welcome to My Island	Caroline Polachek	United States
170	Lights Out	Teen Jesus and the Jean Teasers	Australia
171	Messed Up	Holy Holy featuring Kwame	Australia
172	The News	Paramore	United States
173	AEIOU	Pnau and Empire of the Sun	Australia
174	Pretty Girls	Reneé Rapp	United States
175	We Could Be Love	Hayden James and AR/CO	Australia/United Kingdom
176	Kill(h)er	Stand Atlantic	Australia
177	Little Things	Jorja Smith	United Kingdom
178	Nothing's Stopping Me Now	Dear Seattle	Australia
179	Beggin'	Chris Lake and Aluna	United Kingdom
180	Making the Bed	Olivia Rodrigo	United States
181	Silent Disco	The Terrys	Australia
182	I See Dead People	The Amity Affliction featuring Louie Knuxx	Australia/New Zealand
183	Princess Diana	Ice Spice and Nicki Minaj	United States/Trinidad and Tobago
184	Pets and Drugs	The Rubens	Australia
185	Reelin'	Matt Corby	Australia
186	Go On Without Me	Ruel	Australia
187	Call Me What You Like	Lovejoy	United Kingdom
188	How Much is Weed?	Dominic Fike	United States
189	Best You Ever Had	Kita Alexander	Australia
190	Over	Chvrches	United Kingdom
191	Stay (Like a Version)	Rum Jungle	Australia
192	I Like It	Teenage Dads	Australia
193	A Night to Remember	Beabadoobee and Laufey	United Kingdom/Iceland
194	Don't Date the Teenager	Gretta Ray	Australia
195	The Hillbillies	Baby Keem and Kendrick Lamar	United States
196	Salt	Teen Jesus and the Jean Teasers featuring The Grogans	Australia
197	Tied Up!	Genesis Owusu	Australia
198	Sitting in Traffic	Ruel	Australia
199	Dash of Speed	Rum Jungle	Australia
200	Leave That	Old Mervs	Australia

== Statistics ==
=== Artists with multiple entries ===
#	Artist	Tracks
7	G Flip	2, 22, 24, 26, 50, 65, 80
4	Fred Again (Note: Three times as a primary artist (6, 35, 51) and once as a co-lead artist (12))	6, 12, 35, 51
4	Olivia Rodrigo	11, 32, 34, 56
4	SZA (Note: Three times solo (13, 70, 75) and once with Drake (25))	13, 25, 70, 75
3	Dom Dolla (Note: Twice solo (3, 18), once with MK)	3, 4, 18
3	Troye Sivan	8, 31, 33
3	Skrillex (Note: Twice as a primary artist (35, 87) and once as a co-lead artist (12))	12, 35, 87
3	Lana Del Rey	29, 60, 91
3	The Rions	38, 40, 71
3	Peach PRC	63, 68, 81
3	Teenage Dads	74, 79, 88
2	Doja Cat	1, 49
2	Fisher	14, 23
2	Tate McRae	21, 82
2	Lime Cordiale	27, 42
2	Dua Lipa	28, 41
2	Boygenius	30, 98
2	Ice Spice (Note: Twice as a co-lead artist)	36, 66
2	Bring Me the Horizon	57, 58
2	Pacific Avenue	59, 92
2	The Kid Laroi	61, 78
2	Genesis Owusu	69, 97

=== Countries represented ===
Country	#
Australia	52
United States	29
United Kingdom	20
South Africa	5
Canada	5
Albania	2
Ghana	2
Nigeria	1
South Korea	1
Latvia	1
New Zealand	1
Japan	1
Germany	1
Trinidad and Tobago	1
Philippines	1
Denmark	1

=== Minor statistics ===
- Australian singer-songwriter and actress Kylie Minogue broke Slipknot's record for the longest time between two appearances in the Triple J Hottest 100 with 26 years between her songs "Did It Again" that placed No. 81 in 1997 and "Padam Padam" that placed number 48 in the 2023 countdown. This broke Slipknot's previous record of 19 years with their songs "Wait and Bleed" that placed No. 75 in 2000 and "Unsainted" that placed No. 86 in 2019.
- With all songs lasting 5 hours and 28 minutes in total, and an average song length of 3 minutes 16 seconds, this was the shortest running Triple J Hottest 100 countdown in history.
- For the first time since 1996, Triple J did not hold an Album Poll.
- Aatig is the first artist from Latvia to appear in the Hottest 100. In addition, Beabadoobee is the first artist from the Philippines to appear in the Hottest 100.
- South Africa contributed a record 5 entries to the 2023 Hottest 100.
- The song "Fall at Your Feet" by Crowded House charted in the countdown for the second time after a cover by Peking Duk and Julia Stone featured at No. 64. Boy & Bear's cover charted at No. 5 in 2010. "Video Killed the Radio Star" by The Buggles also charted for a second time after a cover by Teenage Dads charted at No. 79; the original also placed at No. 79 in the 1998 Of All Time countdown.
- For the first time ever, no bands had made the top 10.
