= Pump the Brakes =

2021 single by Dom Dolla

Single by Dom Dolla
- Released: 26 March 2021
- Genre: Tech house
- Length: 3:40
- Label: Sweat It Out
- Songwriter(s): Dominic Matheson
- Producer(s): Dom Dolla

Dom Dolla singles chronology
"Moving Blind" (2020)	"Pump the Brakes" (2021)	"Strangers" (2021)

Music video
- "Pump the Brakes on YouTube

"Pump the Brakes" is a song by Australian record producer Dom Dolla. It was released on 26 March 2021, via Sweat It Out. Dolla wrote and produced the song.

At the 2021 ARIA Music Awards, the song was nominated for Best Dance Release.

At the 2022 Electronic Dance Music Awards, the song was nominated for House Song of the Year.

== Critical reception ==
Katie Stone of EDM.com felt that the song was "a clear progression from his breakout single 'Take It' which came out back in 2018." Hayden Davies of Pilerats commented that it "[is] rushing with energy, emphasising a pulsing four-on-the-floor kick and moulding it together with strobing melodies and sampling that gives the track the same infectious edge that people have come to adore through his recent work."

== Music video ==
An accompanying "car-culture vibe" music video was released on 14 May 2021, and directed by Prad Sen. The video is set "in a run-down over stocked car yard", and focuses on Dolla's vehicle, a 2001 Toyota Camry. It also features "characters' eccentric styling, including spoiler-styled haircuts, obnoxious jewelry, and matching tracksuits, with Dom himself joining them for the ludicrous ride."

== Charts ==
Chart performance for "Pump the Brakes"
Chart (2021)	Peak position
Belgium (Ultratip Bubbling Under Flanders)	16
New Zealand Hot Singles (RMNZ)	39
US Hot Dance/Electronic Songs (Billboard)	33

== Certifications ==
Certifications for "Pump the Brakes"
Region	Certification	Certified units/sales
Australia (ARIA)	Gold	35,000^{‡}
^{‡} Sales+streaming figures based on certification alone.
