= In Our Own Sweet Time =

Studio album by Vance Joy
- Released: 10 June 2022
- Genre: Folk pop
- Length: 41:08
- Label: Liberation Music

Vance Joy chronology
Live at Red Rocks Amphitheatre (2018)	In Our Own Sweet Time (2022)

Singles from In Our Own Sweet Time
- 1. "Missing Piece" Released: 21 May 2021; 2. "Don't Fade" Released: 11 February 2022; 3. "Clarity" Released: 8 April 2022; 4. "Every Side of You" Released: 3 June 2022; 5. "Catalonia" Released: 10 June 2023

In Our Own Sweet Time is the third studio album by Australian singer-songwriter Vance Joy. The album was released on 10 June 2022 through Liberation Music. The album was announced on 7 April 2022 and written during the COVID-19 pandemic. It was preceded by the singles "Missing Piece", "Don't Fade", "Clarity" and "Every Side of You".

The album was supported by the Long Way Home Tour, which commenced in Darwin on 17 September 2022.

At the AIR Awards of 2023, the album was nominated for Best Independent Pop Album or EP.

== Background ==
Joy said that the album is about the idea of creating a life – and a world – with someone special, stating: "I'm always drawn to the idea of timelessness or that shared moment that takes you out of the chaos outside. If the world is crazy, you can retreat somewhere. It's always hard to think of the right title but I think that sums up the album perfectly."

== Singles ==
"Missing Piece" was released as the lead single from the album on 21 May 2021. The song peaked at number 14 on the Australian Singles Chart and has been certified double platinum. The Annelise Hickey-directed video won the ARIA Award for Best Video at the 2021 ARIA Music Awards.

"Don't Fade" premiered on Triple J 10 February 2022 was officially released the following day as the album's second single.

"Clarity" premiered on 7 April 2022, alongside the album's announcement. The song was released on 8 April 2022. "Clarity" was nominated for Best Pop Release and Song of the Year at the 2022 ARIA Music Awards.

The fourth single "Every Side of You" was released on 3 June 2022, a week before the album's release date.

"Catalonia" was released on 10 June 2022, alongside the album's release.

== Track listing ==
In Our Own Sweet Time track listing
No.	Title	Writer(s)	Producer(s)	Length
1.	"Don't Fade"	James Keogh; Dave Bassett	Bassett	3:10
2.	"Solid Ground"	Keogh; Bassett	Bassett; Edwin White^{[c]}	3:33
3.	"Missing Piece"	Keogh; Joel Little	White; Little	3:35
4.	"Catalonia"	Keogh; Bassett	Bassett; White^{[c]}	3:38
5.	"Way That I'm Going"	Keogh; Daniel Tashian; Ian Fitchuk; Bassett	Bassett; White^{[c]}	3:47
6.	"Every Side of You"	Keogh; Bassett	Bassett; White	3:24
7.	"Clarity"	Keogh; Little	Little; White^{[a]}	3:47
8.	"Wavelength"	Keogh; David Longstreth; David Biral; Denzel Baptiste	White; Longstreth; Take a Daytrip	3:38
9.	"Boardwalk"	Keogh; Bassett	Bassett; White^{[c]}	3:10
10.	"Looking at Me Like That"	Keogh; James Earp	White; Earp; Gethin Williams	3:20
11.	"This One"	Keogh; Daniel Dodd Wilson	Wilson; Bassett; White	3:15
12.	"Daylight"	Keogh	Bassett; White	2:51
Total length:				41:08

Notes

- ^{^[a]} indicates an additional producer
- ^{^[c]} indicates a co-producer

== Personnel ==
Musicians

- Vance Joy – vocals (all tracks), guitar (2, 3, 5, 7, 9), ukulele (4), banjo (11)
- Dave Bassett – acoustic guitar (1, 2, 4, 6, 9, 12), bass (1, 2, 4–6, 9, 12), piano (1, 2, 5, 6, 11, 12); electric guitar, synthesizer (1, 2, 5, 6, 9); backing vocals (2); electric piano, Hammond B3 organ, Wurlitzer (9); baritone guitar, harmonium, whistle (12)
- Edwin White – drums (2–7, 9–12), percussion (2, 4–6, 8–11), keyboards (4, 6, 10, 11); background vocals, electric guitar (11)
- Kieran Conran – euphonium (2), trombone (2, 9), bass trombone (9)
- Mark Fitzpatrick – flugelhorn (2, 9), trumpet (4, 7, 9)
- Nicolas Fleury – French horn (2)
- Joel Little – bass, programming (3, 7); drums, guitar, keyboards (3); backing vocals (7)
- Will Morrissey – saxophone (4)
- David Biral – bass, drums, keyboards, percussion, programming (8)
- Denzel Baptiste – bass, drums, keyboards, percussion, programming (8)
- David Longstreth – guitar (8, 11)
- James Earp – bass, guitar (10)
- Gethin Williams – guitar (10)
- Dan Wilson – guitar, pump organ, upright piano (11)

Technical

- Dale Becker – mastering (1, 2, 4–12)
- Ted Jensen – mastering (3)
- Jeff Ellis – mixing (1, 2, 5, 6, 8–12)
- Spike Stent – mixing (3, 4, 7)
- Kayla Reagan – mix engineering (1, 2, 5, 6, 8–12)
- Dave Bassett – engineering (1, 2, 4–6, 9, 11, 12)
- Guus Hoevenaars – engineering (2–7, 9, 11, 12)
- Joel Little – engineering (3, 7)
- David Longstreth – engineering (8)
- James Earp – engineering (10)
- John Mark Nelson – engineering (11)
- Sara Mulford – engineering (11)
- Trevor Taylor – mixing assistance (1, 2, 5, 6, 8–12)

== Charts ==
Chart performance for In Our Own Sweet Time
Chart (2022)	Peak position
Australian Albums (ARIA)	3
Canadian Albums (Billboard)	21
New Zealand Albums (RMNZ)	40
Swiss Albums (Schweizer Hitparade)	91
UK Album Downloads (Official Charts)	40
US Top Album Sales (Billboard)	81
US Top Rock Albums (Billboard)	48

== Certifications ==
Certifications for In Our Own Sweet Time
Region	Certification	Certified units/sales
Australia (ARIA)	Silver	20,000^{‡}
New Zealand (RMNZ)	Gold	7,500^{‡}
^{‡} Sales+streaming figures based on certification alone.
