= Every Side of You =

2022 single by Vance Joy

Single by Vance Joy

from the album In Our Own Sweet Time
- Released: 3 June 2022
- Length: 3:24
- Label: Liberation
- Songwriters: James Keogh; Dave Bassett
- Producers: Dave Bassett; Edwin White

Vance Joy singles chronology
"Clarity" (2022)	"Every Side of You" (2022)	"Catalonia" (2022)

Music video
- "Every Side of You" on YouTube

"Every Side of You" is a song by Australian singer-songwriter Vance Joy, released on 3 June 2022 as the fourth single from Joy's third studio album, In Our Own Sweet Time.

In a press release upon release, Joy said he wrote the song in July 2020. with long time collaborator Dave Bassett.

At the 2022 ARIA Music Awards, the William Bleakley directed video, filmed in regional Victoria won the ARIA Award for Best Video.

== Reception ==
Ellie Robinson from NME called the song "a wholesome and heartfelt ode to human connection."
