= San Frandisco =

2019 single by Dom Dolla

Single by Dom Dolla
- Released: 20 September 2019
- Length: 3:05
- Label: Sweat It Out
- Songwriter: Dom Dolla
- Producer: Dom Dolla

Dom Dolla singles chronology
"Take It" (2018)	"San Frandisco" (2019)	"Moving Blind" (2020)

"San Frandisco" is a song by Australian house music producer Dom Dolla, released on 20 September 2019 as a stand-alone single.

"San Frandisco" was the recipient of multiple awards, including Best Independent Dance, Electronica or Club Single at the 2020 AIR Awards and Best Dance Release at the 2020 ARIA Music Awards (marking the second time Dolla had received a nomination for the award, following "Take It" in 2019), and was certified gold in Australia in 2020.

The song was nominated for Most Performed Dance Work at the APRA Music Awards of 2021

== Background ==
Discussing the track, Dolla said: "San Francisco is where a lot of successful house music producers come from. Every time I went to San Fran, the audience and I seemed to gel. They really connected with my music and the records I was writing, and as I was leaving the club one night, I felt like writing a song to San Francisco."

== Critical reception ==
Daniela Koulikov from Forte Magazine said "It's colourful, vibrant and addictive: equipped with blazing sirens, a deep bassline, and constant beats – perfectly for capturing the community of San Fran whilst also keeping the crowd dancing."

== Track listings ==
Digital download

1. "San Frandisco" – 3:05
2. "Take It" – 3:54

Vinyl remixes (SWEATSV008)

- Side A
1. "San Frandisco" (Extended Mix)
2. "San Frandisco" (Walker & Royce Remix)
- Side B
1. "San Frandisco" (Eli Brown Remix)
2. "San Frandisco" (Illyus & Barrientos Remix)

== Awards and nominations ==
AIR Awards

Year	Nominee / work	Award	Result	Ref.
2020	"San Francdisco"	Best Independent Dance, Electronica or Club Single	Won	

ARIA Music Awards

Year	Nominee / work	Award	Result	Ref.
2020	"San Francdisco"	Best Dance Release	Won	

== Charts ==
Weekly chart performance for "San Frandisco"
Chart (2019–2020)	Peak position
Australia Club (ARIA Charts)	1
Belgium (Ultratip Bubbling Under Flanders)	40
Hungary (Dance Top 40)	33

== Certifications ==
Certifications for "San Frandisco"
Region	Certification	Certified units/sales
Australia (ARIA)	Platinum	70,000^{‡}
New Zealand (RMNZ)	Gold	15,000^{‡}
^{‡} Sales+streaming figures based on certification alone.

== See also ==
- List of number-one club tracks of 2019 (Australia)
