= Dream Ride =

Studio album by G Flip
- Released: 5 September 2025
- Studio: Los Angeles
- Length: 31:40
- Labels: G Flip; AWAL
- Producers: G Flip; Aidan Hogg

G Flip chronology
Drummer (2023)	Dream Ride (2025)

Singles from Dream Ride
- 1. "Disco Cowgirl" Released: 16 May 2025; 2. "Big Ol' Hammer" Released: 13 June 2025; 3. "In Another Life" Released: 11 July 2025; 4. "Bed on Fire" Released: 5 September 2025

Dream Ride is the third studio album by Australian indie pop singer G Flip. It was announced on 1 July 2025 and released on 5 September 2025. G Flip describes the album as a "80s Butch Springsteen fantasy".

At the 2026 ARIA Music Awards it was nominated for Best Solo Artist and Best Pop Release.

== Tour ==
The album will be supported with The Dream Ride Tour across the United States, United Kingdom and Australia between September 2025 and March 2026.

== Critical reception ==
Brooke Gibbs from Future Mag Music said "As a whole, Dream Ride is G Flip's most daring and theatrical album to date. Compared to the stripped honesty of About Us and the drum-driven confidence of Drummer, this record is a widescreen production; brash, experimental, sometimes uneven, but always ambitious."

The Australian said "G Flip's third album intriguing and bizarre, but still a complete mess that soon runs out of petrol".

Luke Nuttall from The Sound Bar described the album as "a testament to G Flip's artistic growth".

== Track listing ==
Dream Ride track listing
No.	Title	Writer(s)	Length
1.	"Disco Cowgirl"	Georgia Flipo; Buzz; Aidan Hogg	3:25
2.	"I Don't Wanna Regret"	Flipo; Hogg	2:38
3.	"In Another Life"	Flipo; Hogg; K Sotomayor	3:28
4.	"Bed on Fire"	Flipo; Hogg; Steph Marziano; Jesse Thomas	3:33
5.	"Cut His Dick Off"	Flipo; Hogg; Charlie Orian	3:07
6.	"Baby, I'm a Winner"	Flipo; Hogg; Emma Louise Lobb	2:27
7.	"Big Ol' Hammer"	Flipo; Hogg; Sotomayor; Thomas	2:27
8.	"Exactly What I Like"	Flipo; Hogg; Marziano	2:32
9.	"Lush"	Flipo; Hogg; Fernando Navarro	2:41
10.	"Let's Take This Show on the Road"	Flipo; Hogg; Thomas	3:48
Total length:			31:40

== Personnel ==
Credits adapted from Tidal.

- Georgia Flipo – lead vocals, production
- Aidan Hogg – production, engineering
- Dan Grech-Marguerat – mixing
- Emerson Mancini – mastering

== Charts ==
Weekly chart performance for Dream Ride
Chart (2025)	Peak position
Australian Albums (ARIA)	4

Year-end chart performance for Dream Ride
Chart (2025)	Position
Australian Artist Albums (ARIA)	41
