= ARIA Award for Best Video =

Australian music award

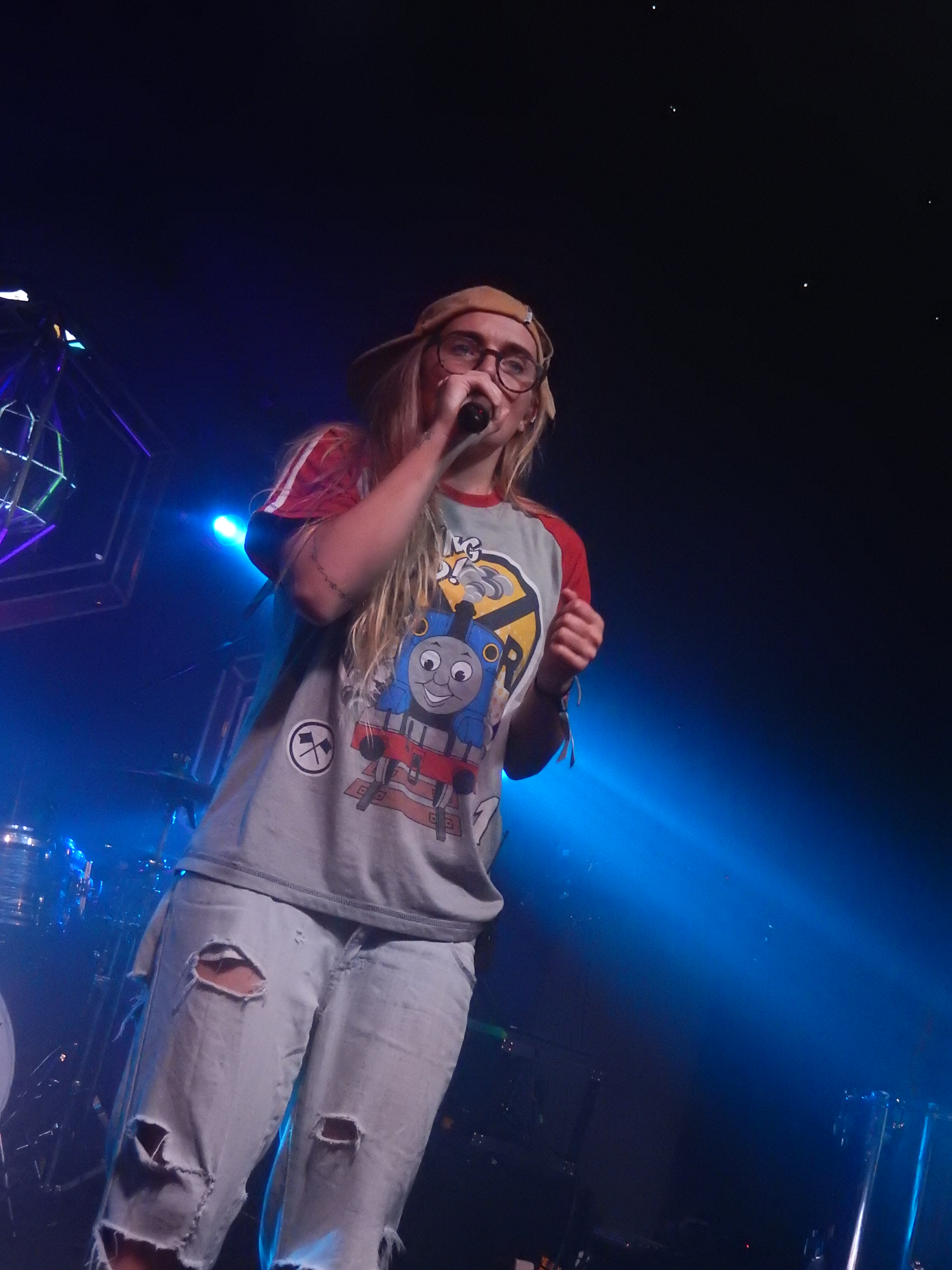
- Tas Wilson won in 2026 for "Bed on Fire" by G Flip (pictured)
- Country: Australia
- Presented by: Australian Recording Industry Association (ARIA)
- First award: 1987
- Currently held by: Tas Wilson for G Flip, "Bed on Fire" (2026)
- Website: ariaawards.com.au

The ARIA Award for Best Video is presented at the annual ARIA Awards, which recognise "the many achievements of Aussie artists across all music genres", since 1987. It is handed out by the Australian Recording Industry Association (ARIA), an organisation whose aim is "to advance the interests of the Australian record industry." The award is given to a director of a music video by an Australian-based group or solo artist, which was released within the eligibility period. Initially (from 1987 to 2011), it was voted for by a judging academy, which consisted of 1000 members from different areas of the music industry.

From 2012 onwards, the winner has instead been determined by the general public. The final nominees are the top ten most played music videos, during the eligibility period, performed by an Australian-based artist. According to an ARIA representative, "Concept, direction and performance of the video are major criteria, not necessarily the excellence of the music. This Award is presented to the Director of the entered video who must meet the general eligibility criteria for artists. If the single was not commercially released, then the media servicing date must fall within the eligibility period." The public votes are tallied by ARIA, with the winner announced at the awards ceremony.

== Winners and nominees ==
In the following table, the winner is highlighted in a separate colour, and in boldface; the other final nominees, where known, are not highlighted or in boldface.

Winner marked in a separate colour

=== Peer voted ===
Year	Winner(s)	Video title
**1987** (1st)
**1987** (1st)	**Alex Proyas** for **Crowded House**	**"Don't Dream It's Over"**
**1987** (1st)	Alex Proyas for INXS	"Kiss the Dirt"
**1987** (1st)	Julie Stone Productions for Big Pig	"Hungry Town"
**1987** (1st)	Kimble Rendall for Boom Crash Opera	"Hands Up in the Air"
**1987** (1st)	Tony Leitch and Andrew de Groot for Hunters & Collectors	"Everything's on Fire"
**1988** (2nd)	**Claudia Castle** for **Paul Kelly**	**"To Her Door"**
**1989** (3rd)
**1989** (3rd)	**Richard Lowenstein** for **INXS**	**"Never Tear Us Apart"**
**1989** (3rd)	Claudia Castle for Big Pig	"Big Hotel"
**1989** (3rd)	Andrew de Groot for Midnight Oil	"Dreamworld"
**1989** (3rd)	Paul Elliott for Crowded House	"When You Come"
**1989** (3rd)	Stephen Priest and Steve Hopkins for John Farnham	"Age of Reason"
**1990** (4th)	**Geoff Barter** for **1927**	**"Compulsory Hero"**
**1991** (5th)	**Claudia Castle** for **Midnight Oil**	**"Blue Sky Mine"**
**1992** (6th)
**1992** (6th)	**John Hillcoat** for **Crowded House**	**"Chocolate Cake"**
**1992** (6th)	Paul Elliott for Boom Crash Opera	"Holywater"
**1992** (6th)	Stephen Johnson for Yothu Yindi	"Treaty (Filthy Lucre Remix)"
**1992** (6th)	Marcel Lunam for Died Pretty	"D.C."
**1992** (6th)	Brendon Young for Tall Tales and True	"Lifeboat"
**1993** (7th)
**1993** (7th)	**Stephen Johnson** for **Yothu Yindi**	**"Djäpana (Sunset Dreaming)"**
**1993** (7th)	Robbie Douglas-Turner for Frente!	"Ordinary Angels"
**1993** (7th)	Paul Elliott for Boom Crash Opera	"Bettadaze"
**1993** (7th)	Paul Goldman for Lisa Edwards	"Cry"
**1993** (7th)	Chris Langman for The Sharp	"Talking Sly"
**1994** (8th)
**1994** (8th)	**Richard Lowenstein** for **INXS**	**"The Gift"**
**1994** (8th)	Andrew Dominik for The Cruel Sea	"The Honeymoon Is Over"
**1994** (8th)	Paul Elliott for Midnight Oil	"Outbreak of Love"
**1994** (8th)	Paul Elliott and Sally Bongers for Christine Anu and Paul Kelly	"Last Train"
**1994** (8th)	Craig Griffin for John Farnham	"Seemed Like a Good Idea (At the Time)"
**1995** (9th)
**1995** (9th)	**Keir McFarlane** for **Kylie Minogue**	**"Put Yourself in My Place"**
**1995** (9th)	Robbie Douglas-Turner for You Am I	"Jewels and Bullets"
**1995** (9th)	Bob Ellis for Electric Hippies	"Greedy People"
**1995** (9th)	Paul Elliott for Max Sharam	"Coma"
**1995** (9th)	Tony Mahoney for Dave Graney & the Coral Snakes	"I'm Gonna Release Your Soul"
**1996** (10th)
**1996** (10th)	**Andrew Lancaster** for **You Am I**	**"Soldiers"**
**1996** (10th)	Robbie Douglas-Turner for The Cruel Sea	"Too Fast for Me"
**1996** (10th)	John Fransic for Swoop	"Apple Eyes"
**1996** (10th)	John Hillcoat and Polly Borland for Frente!	"Sit on My Hands"
**1996** (10th)	John Witteron for Hoodoo Gurus	"Waking up Tired"
**1997** (11th)
**1997** (11th)	**Tony Mahony** for **Dave Graney & the Coral Snakes**	**"Feelin' Kinda Sporty"**
**1997** (11th)	Greg Harrington and Ross Fraser for John Farnham	"All Kinds of People"
**1997** (11th)	Janet English for Spiderbait	"Calypso"
**1997** (11th)	Jeff Darling for Crowded House	"Not the Girl You Think You Are"
**1997** (11th)	Mark Hartley for You Am I	"Good Mornin'"
**1997** (11th)	Tony McGrath for Savage Garden	"To the Moon and Back"
**1998** (12th)
**1998** (12th)	**Baz Luhrmann** for **Christine Anu**, **David Hobson** and **Royce Doherty** (Note: ARIA lists Dave Dobson as one of three artists for "Now Until the Break of Day". Opera tenor, David Hobson is described as a 1998 ARIA Award winner.)	**"Now Until the Break of Day"**
**1998** (12th)	Chris Bently for Groove Terminator	"Losing Ground"
**1998** (12th)	Mark Hartley for The Cruel Sea	"Takin' All Day"
**1998** (12th)	Jeremy Hydnes and George Pinn for Regurgitator	"Polyester Girl"
**1998** (12th)	Quan Yeomans for Regurgitator	"Black Bugs"
**1999** (13th)
**1999** (13th)	**Andrew Lancaster** and **David McCormack** for **Custard**	**"Girls Like That (Don't Go For Guys Like Us)"**
**1999** (13th)	Cate Anderson for Silverchair	"Ana's Song (Open Fire)"
**1999** (13th)	Andrew Dominik for The Cruel Sea	"You'll Do"
**1999** (13th)	Craig Melville and David Curry for Josh Abrahams	"Addicted to Bass"
**1999** (13th)	Tony McGrath for Regurgitator	"! (The Song Formerly Known As)"
**2000** (14th)
**2000** (14th)	**Mark Hartley** for **Madison Avenue**	**"Who the Hell Are You"**
**2000** (14th)	Bart Borghese for Nokturnl	"Neva Mend"
**2000** (14th)	Mark Hartley for Bardot	"Poison"
**2000** (14th)	Mark Hartley for Madison Avenue	"Don't Call Me Baby"
**2000** (14th)	Paul Butler and Scott Walton for Regurgitator	"Happiness (Rotting My Brain)"
**2001** (15th)
**2001** (15th)	**Ben Saunders** for **Eskimo Joe**	**"Wake Up"**
**2001** (15th)	Bart Borghesi for Something for Kate	"Monsters"
**2001** (15th)	Mark Hartley for Human Nature	"He Don't Love You"
**2001** (15th)	Mark Hartley for Invertigo	"Chances Are"
**2001** (15th)	Paul Butler and Scott Walton for Gerling	"The Deer in You"
**2001** (15th)	Paul Butler and Scott Walton for Powderfinger	"Like a Dog"
**2001** (15th)	Kelley Abbey for Scandal'us	"Me, Myself & I"
**2002** (16th)
**2002** (16th)	**Michael Gracey** and **Babyfoot Productions** for **1200 Techniques**	**"Karma (What Goes Around)"**
**2002** (16th)	Jolyon Watkins for Gerling	"Dust Me Selecta"
**2002** (16th)	Michael Spiccia and Prodigy Films for Disco Montego	"Beautiful"
**2002** (16th)	Nash Edgerton for Eskimo Joe	"Liar"
**2002** (16th)	Square-Eyed Films for Silverchair	"The Greatest View"
**2003** (17th)
**2003** (17th)	**Bart Borghesi** for **The Androids**	**"Do It with Madonna"**
**2003** (17th)	Paul Butler, Scott Walton and 50/50 Films for Gerling	"Who's Ya Daddy?"
**2003** (17th)	Paul Butler, Scott Walton and 50/50 Films for Powderfinger	"(Baby I've Got You) On My Mind"
**2003** (17th)	Sam Bennetts and Rising Sun Pictures for Rogue Traders	"One of My Kind"
**2003** (17th)	Sean Gilligan and Sarah-Jane Woulahan for Silverchair	"Across the Night"
**2004** (18th)
**2004** (18th)	**James Hackett** for **The Dissociatives**	"**Somewhere Down the Barrel**"
**2004** (18th)	Claudia Castle for Pete Murray	"So Beautiful"
**2004** (18th)	Nash Edgerton for The Sleepy Jackson	"Good Dancers"
**2004** (18th)	Paul Butler, Scott Walton and 50/50 Films for Spiderbait	"Black Betty"
**2004** (18th)	Squareyed Films for Missy Higgins	"Scar"
**2005** (19th)
**2005** (19th)	**Ben Quinn** for **End of Fashion**	"**O Yeah**"
**2005** (19th)	Adrian Van De Velde for Thirsty Merc	"In the Summertime"
**2005** (19th)	Ben Joss and Tribal for The John Butler Trio	"Something's Gotta Give"
**2005** (19th)	Ben Quinn for The Cat Empire	"The Car Song"
**2005** (19th)	Sam Bennetts and Mad Angel for Rogue Traders	"Voodoo Child"
**2006** (20th)
**2006** (20th)	**Head Pictures** for **Bernard Fanning**	"**Wish You Well**"
**2006** (20th)	Andy Cassell for Youth Group	"Forever Young"
**2006** (20th)	Bart Borghessi for Eskimo Joe	"Black Fingernails, Red Wine"
**2006** (20th)	Kim Moyes for The Presets	"Are You the One?"
**2006** (20th)	Sean Gilligan and Sarah-Jane Woulahan for The Living End	"Wake Up"
**2007** (21st)
**2007** (21st)	**Paul Goldman** and **Alice Bell** for **Silverchair**	**"Straight Lines"**
**2007** (21st)	Ben Saunders and Germain McMicking for Augie March	"The Cold Acre"
**2007** (21st)	Brendan Cook for Gotye	"Hearts a Mess"
**2007** (21st)	Damon Escott and Stephan Lance (Head Pictures) for Powderfinger	"Lost and Running"
**2007** (21st)	Angus McDonald and Daimon Downey for Sneaky Sound System	"Pictures"
**2008** (22nd)
**2008** (22nd)	**Kris Moyes** for **The Presets**	"**My People**"
**2008** (22nd)	Adam Callen for Sneaky Sound System	"Kansas City"
**2008** (22nd)	Angus Stone, Julia Stone and Josh Groom for Angus & Julia Stone	"Just a Boy"
**2008** (22nd)	Damon Escott and Stephen Lance for Silverchair	"If You Keep Losing Sleep"
**2008** (22nd)	James Littlemore for Pnau	"Baby"
**2009** (23rd)
**2009** (23rd)	**Josh Logue** of Mathematics for **Empire of the Sun**	**"Walking on a Dream"**
**2009** (23rd)	Josh Logue of Mathematics for Empire of the Sun	"We Are the People"
**2009** (23rd)	Head Pictures, Damon Escott and Stephen Lance for Sarah Blasko	"All I Want"
**2009** (23rd)	Mark Alston for Kate Miller-Heidke	"The Last Day on Earth"
**2009** (23rd)	Sam Bennetts for Bluejuice	"Broken Leg"
**2010** (24th)
**2010** (24th)	**Kris Moyes** for **Sia**	**"Clap Your Hands"**
**2010** (24th)	Alex Roberts for Art vs. Science	"Magic Fountain"
**2010** (24th)	Krozm (Chris Hill, Ewan Macleod and Lachlan Dickie) for Sarah Blasko	"Bird on a Wire"
**2010** (24th)	Head Pictures for Powderfinger	"All of the Dreamers"
**2010** (24th)	Kiku Ohe for Angus & Julia Stone	"Big Jet Plane"
**2011** (25th)
**2011** (25th)	**Natasha Pincus** for **Gotye** featuring **Kimbra**	**"Somebody That I Used to Know"**
**2011** (25th)	Bart Borghesi for Eskimo Joe	"Love Is a Drug"
**2011** (25th)	Carlo Santone for Geoffrey Gurrumul Yunupingu	"Gopuru"
**2011** (25th)	David Michod and Flood Projects for Children Collide	"Loveless"
**2011** (25th)	Guy Franklin for Kimbra	"Cameo Lover"

=== Publicly voted ===
Year	Winner(s)	Song title
**2012** (26th)
**2012** (26th)	**Natasha Pincus** for **Missy Higgins**	**"Everyone's Waiting"**
**2012** (26th)	Alex Weltlinger for 360 featuring Gossling	"Boys like You"
**2012** (26th)	Luci Schroder for Alpine	"Hands"
**2012** (26th)	Animal Logic for Hilltop Hoods featuring Sia	"I Love It"
**2012** (26th)	Brent "Quincy" Buchanan and The Grindhouse for Jackson Firebird	"Cock Rockin'"
**2012** (26th)	Emma Tomelty for Hermitude	"Speak of the Devil"
**2012** (26th)	Darcy Prendergast and Kate Miller-Heidke for Kate Miller-Heidke	"I'll Change Your Mind"
**2012** (26th)	Josh Logue for Lanie Lane	"(Oh Well) That's What You Get (Falling in Love with a Cowboy)"
**2012** (26th)	Sam Bennetts for Bluejuice	"Act Yr Age"
**2012** (26th)	Josh Logue for The Rubens	"My Gun"
**2013** (27th)
**2013** (27th)	**Christopher Frey** for **Samantha Jade**	**"Firestarter"**
**2013** (27th)	Bryce Jepson for Matt Corby	"Resolution"
**2013** (27th)	Josh Logue for Birds of Tokyo	"Lanterns"
**2013** (27th)	Dave Ma for Flight Facilities featuring Christine Hoberg	"Clair De Lune"
**2013** (27th)	Joe Nappa for Flume	"Holdin On"
**2013** (27th)	Marc Furmie for Justice Crew	"Best Night"
**2013** (27th)	John Hillcoat for Nick Cave and the Bad Seeds	"Jubilee Street"
**2013** (27th)	Andrew Nowrojee for San Cisco	"Fred Astaire"
**2013** (27th)	Marc Furmie and Elisa Mercurio for Timomatic	"Parachute"
**2013** (27th)	Dimitri Basil for Vance Joy	"Riptide"
**2014** (28th)
**2014** (28th)	**Sia Furler** and **Daniel Askill** for **Sia**	**"Chandelier"**
**2014** (28th)	Christian J Henrich and Nicholas Rabone for Bluejuice	"SOS"
**2014** (28th)	Renny Wijeyamohan for Busby Marou	"My Second Mistake"
**2014** (28th)	Toby and Pete for Chet Faker	"Talk Is Cheap"
**2014** (28th)	Charlie Ford for Courtney Barnett	"Avant Gardener"
**2014** (28th)	Lawrence Lim for Jessica Mauboy	"Never Be the Same"
**2014** (28th)	Ben Young for John Butler Trio	"Only One"
**2014** (28th)	Lawrence Lim for Justice Crew	"Que Sera"
**2014** (28th)	Toby Morris for Sheppard	"Geronimo"
**2014** (28th)	Dan Graetz for Violent Soho	"Covered in Chrome"
**2015** (29th)
**2015** (29th)	**Matt Sharp** and **Daniel James** for **The Veronicas**	**"You Ruin Me"**
**2015** (29th)	Prad Senanayake for Alison Wonderland featuring Wayne Coyne	"U Don't Know"
**2015** (29th)	Charlie Ford for Courtney Barnett	"Pedestrian at Best"
**2015** (29th)	Lorin Askill for Daniel Johns	"Aerial Love"
**2015** (29th)	Anthony Rose for Delta Goodrem	"Wings"
**2015** (29th)	Clemens Habicht for Flume featuring Andrew Wyatt	"Some Minds"
**2015** (29th)	Kess Broekman-Dattner for Hermitude featuring Young Tapz	"Through the Roof"
**2015** (29th)	Duncan Toombs for Lee Kernaghan	"Spirit of the Anzacs"
**2015** (29th)	Filmery for Shane Nicholson	"Secondhand Man"
**2015** (29th)	Luci Schroder for Vance Joy	"Georgia"
**2016** (30th)
**2016** (30th)	**Made in Katana** for **Troye Sivan**	**"Youth"**
**2016** (30th)	Anthony Rose for Delta Goodrem	"Dear Life"
**2016** (30th)	Clemens Habicht for Flume featuring Kai	"Never Be Like You"
**2016** (30th)	Dan Graetz for Violent Soho	"Like Soda"
**2016** (30th)	Danny Cohen and Jason Galea for King Gizzard & the Lizard Wizard	"People-Vultures"
**2016** (30th)	Dean Bates for Illy featuring Vera Blue	"Papercuts"
**2016** (30th)	Matt Sharp for Guy Sebastian	"Black & Blue"
**2016** (30th)	Richard Coburn for Hilltop Hoods featuring Montaigne and Thom Thum	"1955"
**2016** (30th)	Sia Furler and Daniel Askill for Sia	"Cheap Thrills"
**2016** (30th)	Sunny Leunig for Courtney Barnett	"Elevator Operator"
**2017** (31st)
**2017** (31st)	**Allan Hardy** and **Tom MacDonald** for **Bliss n Eso** featuring **Gavin James**	"**Moments**"
**2017** (31st)	Tim White for Client Liaison featuring Tina Arena	"A Foreign Affair"
**2017** (31st)	Tobias Willis and Zachary Bradtke for Client Liaison	"Off White Limousine"
**2017** (31st)	Daniel and Jared Daperis for Gang of Youths	"The Deepest Signs, the Frankest Shadows"
**2017** (31st)	Danny Cohen for Kirin J. Callinan	"S.A.D"
**2017** (31st)	Amy Billings for Amy Shark	"Drive You Mad"
**2017** (31st)	Michael Jones for Dean Lewis	"Waves"
**2017** (31st)	Mark Alston for Illy featuring Anne-Marie	"Catch 22"
**2017** (31st)	Emma Tomelty for Jessica Mauboy	"Fallin’"
**2017** (31st)	Sia Furler and Daniel Askill for Sia featuring Kendrick Lamar	"The Greatest"
**2018** (32nd)
**2018** (32nd)	**Jessie Hill** for **Dean Lewis**	**"Be Alright"**
**2018** (32nd)	Amy Billings and Nicholas Waterman for Amy Shark	"I Said Hi"
**2018** (32nd)	Claudia Sangiorgi Dalimore for Mojo Juju	"Native Tongue"
**2018** (32nd)	Danny Cohen for Courtney Barnett	"Need a Little Time"
**2018** (32nd)	David Porte Beckefeld for Client Liaison	"Survival in the City"
**2018** (32nd)	Glenn Mossop and Tash Sultana for Tash Sultana	"Salvation"
**2018** (32nd)	Kris Moyes for The Presets	"Do What You Want"
**2018** (32nd)	Patrick Rohl for Gang of Youths	"The Heart Is a Muscle"
**2018** (32nd)	Ryan Sauer for Peking Duk	"Fire"
**2018** (32nd)	Toby Pike and Nick Littlemore for Pnau	"Go Bang"
**2019** (33rd)
**2019** (33rd)	**James Chappell** for **Guy Sebastian**	**"Choir"**
**2019** (33rd)	Benn Jae for Jessica Mauboy	"Little Things"
**2019** (33rd)	Claudia Sangiorgi Dalimore for Thelma Plum	"Better in Blak"
**2019** (33rd)	Clemens Habicht for Pnau	"Solid Gold"
**2019** (33rd)	Dylan River for Briggs featuring Greg Holden	"Life Is Incredible"
**2019** (33rd)	G Flip for G Flip	"Drink Too Much"
**2019** (33rd)	Gabriel Gasparinatos for Baker Boy	"Cool as Hell"
**2019** (33rd)	Liam Kelly & Nick Kozakis for Tones and I	"Dance Monkey"
**2019** (33rd)	Richard Coburn for Hilltop Hoods featuring Illy and Ecca Vandal	"Exit Sign"
**2019** (33rd)	Sanjay De Silva for Sampa the Great	"Final Form"
**2020** (34th)
**2020** (34th)	**James Chappell** for **Guy Sebastian**	**"Standing with You"**
**2020** (34th)	Gabriel Gasparinatos for Baker Boy (featuring JessB)	"Meditjin"
**2020** (34th)	Jack Shepherd, Oliver Leimbach, Louis Leimbach, James Jennings, Felix Bornholdt, Nich Polovineo, Adam Haynes for Lime Cordiale	"Robbery"
**2020** (34th)	Imogen Grist, Nick Littlemore for Pnau featuring Vlossom	"Lucky"
**2020** (34th)	Sanjay De Silva for Sampa the Great	"Time's Up" (featuring Krown)
**2020** (34th)	Kevin Parker for Tame Impala	"Is It True"
**2020** (34th)	Matt Weston for The Chats	"The Clap"
**2020** (34th)	Nick Kozakis, Liam Kelly, Tones and I for Tones and I	"Ur So F**king Cool"
**2020** (34th)	Troye Sivan for Troye Sivan	"Easy"
**2020** (34th)	Dan Graetz for Violent Soho	"Pick It Up Again"
**2021** (35th)
**2021** (35th)	**Annelise Hickey** for **Vance Joy**	**"Missing Piece"**
**2021** (35th)	Nicholas Muecke for Tkay Maidza	"24k"
**2021** (35th)	Daniele Cernera for Masked Wolf	"Astronaut in the Ocean"
**2021** (35th)	Troye Sivan & Jesse Gohier-Fleet for Troye Sivan	"Could Cry Just Thinkin About You"
**2021** (35th)	Jessie Hill for Julia Stone	"Dance"
**2021** (35th)	Robert Hambling for Midnight Oil	"First Nation"
**2021** (35th)	Mike Soiza for Budjerah	"Higher"
**2021** (35th)	James Chappell for Amy Shark	"Love Songs Ain't for Us"
**2021** (35th)	Johnathan Zawada for The Avalanches	"The Devine Chord"
**2021** (35th)	Nick Kozakis, Liam Kelly, Tones and I for Tones and I	"Won't Sleep"
**2022** (36th)
**2022** (36th)	**William Bleakley** for **Vance Joy**	**"Every Side of You"**
**2022** (36th)	Joe Neathway for Lime Cordiale	"Apple Crumble"
**2022** (36th)	John Angus Stewart for Amyl and the Sniffers	"Hertz"
**2022** (36th)	Julia Jacklin for Julia Jacklin	"Lydia Wears a Cross"
**2022** (36th)	Katzki for Rüfüs Du Sol	"I Don't Wanna Leave"
**2022** (36th)	Macario de Souza for Baker Boy	"Wish You Well" (featuring Bernard Fanning)
**2022** (36th)	Michael Hill for Flume	"Say Nothing" (featuring May-a)
**2022** (36th)	Peter Hume for Luude	"Down Under" (featuring Colin Hay)
**2022** (36th)	Selina Miles for Barkaa	"Blak Matriarchy"
**2022** (36th)	Uncle Friendly (Rhett Wade-Ferrell) for Genesis Owusu	"GTFO"
**2023** (37th)
**2023** (37th)	**Kyle Caulfield for G Flip**	**"Good Enough"**
**2023** (37th)	Claudia Sangiorgi Dalimore for Genesis Owusu	"Stay Blessed"
**2023** (37th)	Joel Burrows for DMA's	"Everybody's Saying Thursday's The Weekend"
**2023** (37th)	Joel Rasmussen and Rowena Rasmussen for Jessica Mauboy	"Give You Love" (feat. Jason Derulo)
**2023** (37th)	Kyle Caulfield for Peach PRC	"Manic Dream Pixie"
**2023** (37th)	Mitch Green for Amy Shark	"Can I Shower at Yours"
**2023** (37th)	Murli Dhir for May-a	"Lola"
**2023** (37th)	Murli Dhir and Made In Katana Studios for Budjerah	"Therapy"
**2023** (37th)	Sam Brumby for King Stingray	"Lookin' Out"
**2023** (37th)	Spod for King Gizzard & the Lizard Wizard	"Gila Monster"
**2024** (38th)
**2024** (38th)	**Tones and I, Nick Kozakis and Sela Vai for Tones and I**	**"Dance with Me"**
**2024** (38th)	Macario de Souza for Amy Shark	"Beautiful Eyes"
**2024** (38th)	Will Hamilton-Coates for Miss Kaninna	"Blak Britney"
**2024** (38th)	Jack Shepherd for Lime Cordiale	"Cold Treatment"
**2024** (38th)	Zac Dov Wiesel for Confidence Man	"I Can't Lose You"
**2024** (38th)	Michael O'Halloran (ONYX Film) for Budjerah	"Is It Ever Gonna Make Sense"
**2024** (38th)	Katzki for Rüfüs Du Sol	"Lately"
**2024** (38th)	Jack Rudder, Jem Siow, Thomas Elliot for Speed	"Real Life Love"
**2024** (38th)	Josh Harris for Peach PRC	"Time of My Life"
**2024** (38th)	John Angus Stewart for Amyl and the Sniffers	"U Should Not Be Doing That"
**2025** (39th)
**2025** (39th)	**Ryan Sauer for Keli Holiday**	**"Dancing2"**
**2025** (39th)	Alexander George (Katzki) for Rüfüs Du Sol	"Break My Love"
**2025** (39th)	Claudia Sangiorgi Dalimore for Missy Higgins	"Craters"
**2025** (39th)	Claudia Sangiorgi Dalimore for Emily Wurramara	"Lordy Lordy"
**2025** (39th)	Dan Lesser for Spacey Jane	"All the Noise"
**2025** (39th)	Jamieson Kerr for Royel Otis	"Car"
**2025** (39th)	John Stewart for Amyl and the Sniffers	"Big Dreams"
**2025** (39th)	Kyle Caulfield and Shevin Dissanayake for Dom Dolla	"Dreamin'"
**2025** (39th)	Roman Anastasios and Jordan Ruyi Blanch for Hilltop Hoods	"Don't Happy, Be Worry"
**2025** (39th)	Utility for VV Pete, Utility and Formation Boyz	"Wassa"
**2026** (40th)
**2026** (40th)	**Tas Wilson for G Flip**	**"Bed on Fire"**
**2026** (40th)	Kyle Caulfield and Charles Buxton-Leslie for Dom Dolla and Puretone	"Addicted to Bass"
**2026** (40th)	Claudia Sangiorgi Dalimore for Miss Kaninna	"Backstreets"
**2026** (40th)	Richie Buxton for Ecca Vandal	"Cruising to Self Soothe"
**2026** (40th)	Jonathan Zawada for The Avalanches	"Every Single Weekend"
**2026** (40th)	Cole Surrey for DMA's	"My Baby's Place"
**2026** (40th)	Adam Saunders for Boy Soda	"Never the Same"
**2026** (40th)	Jared Hinz for James Johnston	"One More"
**2026** (40th)	Aurie Indianna and Jordan Ruyi Blanch for Baker Boy featuring Pardyalone	"Running Low"
**2026** (40th)	Isaac Brown for Genesis Owusu	"Stampede"
