= Danger Danger (song) =

2026 single by Dom Dolla, Solomun and Skepta

Single by Dom Dolla, Solomun and Skepta
- Released: 2 October 2026
- Genre: Deep house; rave
- Length: 3:00
- Label: Good Fortune
- Songwriters: Dominic Matheson; Mladen Solomun; Joseph Adenuga
- Producers: Dom Dolla; Solomun

Dom Dolla singles chronology
"Don't Worry Baby" (2026)	"Danger Danger" (2026)

Solomun singles chronology
"Raider on the Storm" (2026)	"Danger Danger" (2026)

Skepta singles chronology
"Innocent Smile" (2026)	"Danger Danger" (2026)	"Chiltern Firehouse" (2026)

"Danger Danger" is a song by Australian record producer Dom Dolla, Bosnian-German DJ Solomun, and British MC and rapper Skepta, released as a standalone single on 2 October 2026.

Written and recorded by the trio and produced by all bar Skepta, "Danger Danger" was first debuted live in July 2026 during Dolla's and Solomun's respective residencies in Ibiza and was described as "highly anticipated" ahead of its release.

"Danger Danger" debuted and peaked at number 69 on the ARIA Singles Chart, number 5 on the New Zealand Hot Singles Chart, and number 6 on the US Hot Dance/Electronic Songs Chart.

== Background and release ==
"Danger Danger" was first debuted live in Ibiza, Spain, in July 2026 during Dolla's and Solomun's respective residencies there, subsequently becoming a "highly anticipated" release by each of their fanbases. The song was subsequently released as a standalone single on 2 October 2026.

== Critical reception ==
Thorsten Benders from The Nocturnal Times thought the song "put[s] Skepta's renowned vocal attitude to work over a deep, bouncing bassline and sharp rave stabs", while noting that it had "all of the makings to satiate even the hungriest of dancefloors." Your EDM dubbed "Danger Danger" a "rave-ready collaboration", saying, "the track brings together three distinct corners of contemporary dance music, combining heavy club production with Skepta's unmistakable vocal delivery."

The song was Australian music magazine the Music's "power pick" for the week commencing 12 October 2026. (Note: A "power pick" is an Australian song chosen by magazine staff they think has the potential to be the next big Australian chart hit.)

== Charts ==
Weekly chart performance for "Danger Danger"
Chart (2026)	Peak position
Australian (ARIA)	69
New Zealand Hot Singles (RMNZ)	5
US Hot Dance/Electronic Songs (Billboard)	20
