= Missing Piece =

2021 single by Vance Joy

Single by Vance Joy

from the album In Our Own Sweet Time
- Released: 21 May 2021
- Genre: Indie folk
- Length: 3:37
- Label: Liberation
- Songwriters: James Keogh; Joel Little
- Producer: Little

Vance Joy singles chronology
"You" (2021)	"Missing Piece" (2021)	"Don’t Fade" (2022)

Music video
- "Missing Piece" on YouTube

"Missing Piece" is a song by Australian singer-songwriter Vance Joy, released on 21 May 2021 through Liberation Music as the lead single from Joy's third studio album, In Our Own Sweet Time.

Describing the song as about "being separated from someone you love", Joy promoted the song with various merchandise. "Missing Piece" made its television debut in the seventeenth season of American medical drama Grey's Anatomy.

At the 2021 ARIA Music Awards, the song won Best Video for Annelise Hickey's directed video; "Missing Piece" was also nominated for Song of the Year, Best Pop Release and Best Independent Release; Vance Joy was nominated for Best Artist.

At the APRA Music Awards of 2022, the song was nominated for Most Performed Australian Work and Most Performed Alternative Work

At the AIR Awards of 2022, the song was nominated for Independent Song of the Year.

== Background ==
Upon release, Joy said: "'Missing Piece' is a song about being separated from someone you love. It can be tough but when what you have is good you know that these separations are just small stuff; you're both holding the line. It's about the stillness you find when you are together."

== Marketing ==
Joy promoted the single with merchandise including an embroidered blue jumper and a white t-shirt featuring the running woman shown on the cover art.

== Critical reception ==
Ellise Shafer from Variety said "'Missing Piece' is a tried-and-true love song, centered on the feeling of finally finding — as the title suggests — your missing puzzle piece.

Joe Vitagliano from American Songwriter called the song "a heartfelt indie-folk anthem" saying "From its sentimental lyrics to its anthemic melodies, the single feels like a perfect match for a variety of meaningful life moments."

== In other media ==
On 20 May 2021, it was announced that "Missing Piece" would debut in the seventeenth season of American medical drama Grey's Anatomy.

== Track listings ==
digital download

1. Missing Piece - 3:35

digital download

1. Missing Piece (acoustic) - 3:23

digital download

1. Missing Piece (Sofi Tukker remix) - 3:26 oct 21

digital download

1. Missing Piece (RAC remix) - 3:19 dec 21

== Charts ==
=== Weekly charts ===
Weekly chart performance for "Missing Piece"
Chart (2021)	Peak position
Australia (ARIA)	14
Canada (Canadian Hot 100)	69
Canada Rock (Billboard)	9
Czech Republic (Rádio – Top 100)	37
New Zealand Hot Singles (RMNZ)	13
Switzerland Airplay (Schweizer Hitparade)	12
US Hot Rock & Alternative Songs (Billboard)	19
US Rock & Alternative Airplay (Billboard)	4

=== Year-end charts ===
2021 year-end chart performance for "Missing Piece"
Chart (2021)	Position
Australia (ARIA)	43
US Hot Rock & Alternative Songs (Billboard)	46
US Rock Airplay (Billboard)	26

2022 year-end chart performance for "Missing Piece"
Chart (2022)	Position
Australia (ARIA)	57

== Certifications ==
Certifications for "Missing Piece"
Region	Certification	Certified units/sales
Australia (ARIA)	2× Platinum	140,000^{‡}
Canada (Music Canada)	2× Platinum	160,000^{‡}
New Zealand (RMNZ)	Platinum	30,000^{‡}
United Kingdom (BPI)	Silver	200,000^{‡}
United States (RIAA)	Gold	500,000^{‡}
^{‡} Sales+streaming figures based on certification alone.

== Release history ==
Release history for "Missing Piece"
Region	Date	Format	Label	Ref.
Various	21 May 2021	Digital download; streaming	Atlantic	
United States	1 June 2021	Alternative radio	Atlantic	
