= Hyperfine (song) =

2020 single by G Flip

Single by G Flip
- Released: 8 May 2020
- Length: 3:40
- Label: Future Classic
- Songwriters: Georgia Flipo; Aron Forbes; Tavon Thompson
- Producers: Aron Forbes; Tim Anderson

G Flip singles chronology
"Lady Marmalade (Like a version)" (2020)	"Hyperfine" (2020)	"Loose Ends" (2020)

Music video
- "Hyperfine" on YouTube

"Hyperfine" is a song by Australian indie pop singer G Flip. It was released on 8 May 2020.

The song was voted number 7 in the Triple J Hottest 100, 2020 and peaked at number 88 on the ARIA charts in February 2021. It was certified platinum in February 2024.

G Flip said "I wrote this song after having silly little bickering fights with my partner. In relationships it's so common to say 'it's fine' when it’s really not fine. If you care about someone, talk to them. In the context of what's going on, I thought it would be a good chance to drop a bit of a bop to sing along to and feel alive again in this time."

== Track listings ==
Digital download / streaming
No.	Title	Length
1.	"Hyperfine"	3:40

Digital download / streaming
No.	Title	Length
1.	"Hyperfine" (featuring LoveLeo)	3:38

== Charts ==
Chart performance for "Hyperfine"
Chart (2021)	Peak position
Australia (ARIA)	88

== Certifications ==
Certifications and sales for "Hyperfine"
Region	Certification	Certified units/sales
Australia (ARIA)	Platinum	70,000^{‡}
^{‡} Sales+streaming figures based on certification alone.
