= Clarity (Vance Joy song) =

2022 single by Vance Joy

Single by Vance Joy

from the album In Our Own Sweet Time
- Released: 8 April 2022
- Length: 3:47
- Label: Liberation
- Songwriters: James Keogh; Joel Little
- Producer: Little

Vance Joy singles chronology
"Don't Fade" (2022)	"Clarity" (2022)	"Every Side of You" (2022)

Music video
- "Clarity" on YouTube

"Clarity" is a song by Australian singer-songwriter Vance Joy, released on 8 April 2022 through Liberation Music as the third single from Joy's third studio album, In Our Own Sweet Time.

According to a press release, Joy wrote it over Zoom with Joel Little shortly after a Halloween party.

At the 2022 ARIA Music Awards, the song was nominated for Best Pop Release and Song of the Year.

At the APRA Music Awards of 2023, the song was shortlisted for Song of the Year. It was nominated for Most Performed Australian Work of the Year and Most Performed Pop Work of the Year.

== Reception ==
Ellie Robinson from NME said "The new track adds a world of depth to the folky indie-pop slant of Joy's earlier material, supplementing his cool and cruisy acoustic strumming with deep bass grooves, crisp and low-key, yet duly impactful drums and a soaring horn section."

== Track listings ==
Digital download

1. "Clarity" – 3:47

Digital download

1. "Clarity" (Shallou remix) – 3:54

Digital download

1. "Clarity" (Chris Malinchak remix) – 3:50

== Charts ==
=== Weekly charts ===
Weekly chart performance for "Clarity"
Chart (2022)	Peak position
Australia (ARIA)	41

=== Year-end charts ===
Year-end chart performance for "Clarity"
Chart (2022)	Position
Australian Artist (ARIA)	15

== Certifications ==
Region	Certification	Certified units/sales
Australia (ARIA)	Platinum	70,000^{‡}
New Zealand (RMNZ)	Gold	15,000^{‡}
^{‡} Sales+streaming figures based on certification alone.
