= The Worst Person Alive =

2023 single by G Flip

Single by G Flip

from the album Drummer
- Released: 28 June 2023
- Length: 3:30
- Label: Future Classic
- Songwriters: Georgia Flipo, Charlie Brand, BUZZ, Aidan Hogg
- Producers: Georgia Flipo, Aidan Hogg

G Flip singles chronology
"Be Your Man" (2023)	"The Worst Person Alive" (2023)	"Good Enough" (2023)

Music video
- "The Worst Person Alive" on YouTube

"The Worst Person Alive" is a song by Australian indie pop singer G Flip. It was released on 28 June 2023 as the second single from their second studio album, Drummer.

About the song, G Flip said "One day you're in a relationship and the other person is your number one, they know everything about you, they know you better than anyone else, you've had some of your best memories with that person and then you break up and you sadly become strangers. I really hate that it's all or nothing. It's such a drastic change."

The song was voted number 2 in the Triple J Hottest 100, 2023.

At the APRA Music Awards of 2024, the song was nominated for Song of the Year. At the 2024 ARIA Music Awards, the song won Song of the Year.

== Reception ==
In an album review NME's, Karen Gwee said "On break-up song 'The Worst Person Alive', Flipo ratchets sparkling, radio-ready pop-rock up to glorious, Springsteenian proportions, pushing their rasp to the edge as they belt about being made the villain of their ex's story."

== Charts ==
Chart performance for "The Worst Person Alive"
Chart (2023–2024)	Peak position
Australia (ARIA)	81
New Zealand Hot Singles (RMNZ)	29
