= Torren Foot =

Australian house music producer

- Born: 1994 (age 31–32); Melbourne, Australia
- Genres: Tech house, house
- Occupations: DJ, producer
- Instrument: Digital audio workstation
- Labels: Sweat It Out, Club Sweat, OneLove, Clublove

Torren Foot (born 1994) is an Australian house music producer. Together with Dom Dolla, he was nominated for the 2017 ARIA Award for Best Dance Release for the song "Be Randy". He reached number one on the ARIA Club Charts in June 2018 with "Hot Sauce" and in August 2017 with "Be Randy" (with Dom Dolla). He was on the ARIA Club Charts End of Year Charts in 2015 with "1 2 Step" at number 24, in 2016 with "Chosen" at number 33 and "TMFW" (with Hey Sam) at number 41, and in 2017 with "Love Me" at number 4 and "Be Randy" (with Dom Dolla) at number 9.

He has performed at Beyond the Valley as well as Falls Festival in 2014 and 2018

== Discography ==
=== Compilations ===
- Digital Love (2015, mixed by Torren Foot)

=== Singles ===
List of singles as lead artist, with year released
Title	Year
"Rondo"	2012
"Make it Roll" (with Hey Sam)	2013
"Ain't Nobody" (with Hey Sam)	2014
"1, 2 Step"	2015
"TMFW" (with Hey Sam)	2016
"No Time"/"Chosen"	2016
"Love Me"	2017
"Be Randy" (with Dom Dolla)	2017
"Hot Sauce"	2018
"Blowin' up My Phone" (with Double Agent)	2019
"More Life" (solo or featuring Tinie Tempah and L Devine)	2019
"Bad Boy" (with Yung Bae featuring bbno$)	2020
"Take My Hand" (with Lastlings)	2020
"More Life" (featuring Tinie Tempah and L Devine)	2020
"New Bottega" (with Azealia Banks)	2023

== Awards and nominations ==
=== ARIA Music Awards ===
The ARIA Music Awards are annual awards, which recognises excellence, innovation, and achievement across all genres of Australian music. They commenced in 1987.

Year	Nominee / work	Award	Result	Ref.
2017	"Be Randy" (with Dom Dolla)	Best Dance Release	Nominated	
