= Miracle Maker =

2022 single by Dom Dolla

Single by Dom Dolla featuring Clementine Douglas
- Released: 15 July 2022
- Length: 3:08
- Label: Sweat It Out!, Warner
- Songwriters: Dominic Matheson; Clementine Douglas; Mark Anthony Hilaire; Caitlin Stubbs
- Producer: Dom Dolla

Dom Dolla singes singles chronology
"Strangers" (2021)	"Miracle Maker" (2022)	"Rhyme Dust" (2023)

"Miracle Maker" is a song by Australian record producer Dom Dolla, featuring Clementine Douglas released on 15 July 2022. The song was certified gold in Australia in November 2023.

Dolla said the song was influenced by COVID lockdowns, saying, "There weren't any dance floors or opportunities to play shows, so I turned my focus to what got me into dance music. It's been pretty similar to a lot of friends in the scene I've spoken to, everyone's looking back to the '90s and early 2000s sound that first inspired a generation of house music producers."

Dolla told EDM, "I decided I wanted to try my hand and write a timeless rave record that not only made listeners nostalgic for the past but excited about the celebrations we all have to come."

At the 2023 Electronic Dance Music Awards, the song was nominated for Dance Song of the Year

At the APRA Music Awards of 2024, the song was nominated for Most Performed Dance/Electronic Work.

== Critical reception ==
Al Newstead from Triple J called the song a "banger" and a "single with big 2000s Euro-rave energy".

Saad Masood from EDM said "The Australian tech house producer ensures each song he crafts has a distinct hook and dancefloor smashing bass. 'Miracle Maker' continues that trend with a blend of 90s rave energy nostalgia and modern, anthemic dance music."

Chris Salce from Acid Stag said "'Miracle Maker' immediately grabs your attention from the word go with its in your face approach, with those mammoth synths setting up a formidable duo with Douglas' commanding vocals that immediately become stuck in your head."

== Versions ==
Digital download

- "Miracle Maker" – 3:08
- "Miracle Maker" (Ejecta remix) – 3:46
- "Miracle Maker" (Matt Guy remix) – 3:49
- "Miracle Maker" (Airwolf Paradise remix) – 2:59

== Charts ==
Weekly chart performance for "Miracle Maker"
Chart (2022)	Peak position
Australia Club Tracks (ARIA)	2
Australia Dance (ARIA)	12
Netherlands Club (Dutch Top 40)	3
New Zealand Hot Singles (RMNZ)	13
US Hot Dance/Electronic Songs (Billboard)	35

== Certifications ==
Certifications for "Miracle Maker"
Region	Certification	Certified units/sales
Australia (ARIA)	Gold	35,000^{‡}
New Zealand (RMNZ)	Gold	15,000^{‡}
^{‡} Sales+streaming figures based on certification alone.
