= Moving Blind =

2020 single by Dom Dolla and Sonny Fodera

Single by Dom Dolla and Sonny Fodera
- Released: 26 June 2020
- Length: 3:12
- Label: Solotoko & Sweat It Out!, Warner
- Songwriter(s): Dominic Matheson; Sonny Fodera
- Producer(s): Dom Dolla; Sonny Fodera

Dom Dolla singes singles chronology
"San Frandisco" (2019)	"Moving Blind" (2020)	"Pump the Brakes" (2021)

Music video
- "Moving Blind" on YouTube

"Moving Blind" is a song by Australian record producers Dom Dolla and Sonny Fodera released on 26 June 2020. The song was certified gold in Australia in November 2023.

Dolla told Triple J the song is "open to interpretation" saying, "I feel like if you’ve experienced what the lyrics are talking about you'll be able to relate."

The James Stevens directed music video was released in July 2020.

== Critical reception ==
Al Newstead from Triple J called the song a "huge dance music crossover". Newstead said "The duo have crafted a subterranean atmosphere with crusty synths and sizzling hi-hats built around bubbling bass and a slightly sinister vocal that sounds like someone lurking their way through a sweaty club".

== Track listings ==
Digital download

1. "Moving Blind" – 3:12

Digital download (Remixes)

1. "Moving Blind" (Gordon City remix) – 3:23
2. "Moving Blind" (Cloonee remix) – 3:46
3. "Moving Blind" (Biscuits remix) – 3:41
4. "Moving Blind" – 3:12

Digital download

1. "Moving Blind" (Gordon City extended remix) – 5:41

Vinyl remixes (SWEATSV012)

- Side A
1. "Moving Blind" (Extended mix) – 5:21
- Side B
1. "Moving Blind" (Gordon City extended remix) – 5:41

== Charts ==
Weekly chart performance for "Moving Blind"
Chart (2020)	Peak position
Australia Club Tracks (ARIA)	1
New Zealand Hot Singles (RMNZ)	39

== Certifications ==
Certifications for "Moving Blind"
Region	Certification	Certified units/sales
Australia (ARIA)	Gold	35,000^{‡}
^{‡} Sales+streaming figures based on certification alone.

== See also ==
- List of number-one club tracks of 2020 (Australia)
