= Rhyme Dust =

2023 single by MK and Dom Dolla

Single by MK featuring Dom Dolla

from the album In the Night Again
- Released: 24 February 2023
- Length: 3:01
- Label: Big On Blue; Columbia
- Songwriters: Dominic Matheson; Claydes Smith; Cleveland Horne; Dennis Thomas; Gene Redd; George "Funky" Brown; James Yancey; Kamaal Fareed; Marc Kinchen; Richard Westfield; Robert Bell; Robert Mickens; Ronald Bell; Roy Handy
- Producers: MK; Dom Dolla

MK singles chronology
"Better" (2022)	"Rhyme Dust" (2023)	"Asking" (2023)

Dom Dolla singles chronology
"Miracle Maker" (2022)	"Rhyme Dust" (2023)	"Eat Your Man" (2023)

"Rhyme Dust" is a song by American DJ and record producer MK featuring Australian record producer Dom Dolla. It was released on 24 February 2023. The track, is built on a sample of Q-Tip's 2000 song "Breathe and Stop".

The song became Dolla's seventh number 1 on the ARIA Club Chart.

At the 2023 ARIA Music Awards, the song was nominated for Best Dance/Electronic Release and Song of the Year. It won the former.

The song was nominated for Best Single at the Rolling Stone Australia Awards.

== Background ==
"Rhyme Dust" was teased by the duos during festival sets in 2022. In November 2022, it featured in Dolla's 90-minute Selected Sessions set, filmed in Belgrade, Serbia.

Around Christmas 2022, a snippet was released, according to Dolla "to see what the vibe was … the internet ran away with it… which is amazing." A version of the song went viral on TikTok and climbing the SoundCloud viral charts. The official version was announced on 16 February and released on 24 February 2023.

== Critical reception ==
Sose Fuamoli from Triple J called it "a captivating three minute track that draws you in instantly with its relentless beats and pounding pace."

== Versions ==
Digital download/streaming

- "Rhyme Dust" – 3:01
- "Rhyme Dust" (Extended) – 5:30
- "Rhyme Dust" (Nic Fanciulli remix) – 3:01
- "Rhyme Dust" (Dimension remix) – 3:24
- "Rhyme Dust" (Major Lazer remix) – 3:03

== Charts ==
=== Weekly charts ===
Weekly chart performance for "Rhyme Dust"
Chart (2023)	Peak position
Australia (ARIA)	32
Ireland (IRMA)	31
New Zealand Hot Singles (RMNZ)	4
UK Singles (Official Charts)	63
US Hot Dance/Electronic Songs (Billboard)	9

=== Year-end charts ===
2023 year-end chart performance for "Rhyme Dust"
Chart (2023)	Position
Australian Artist (ARIA)	7
US Hot Dance/Electronic Songs (Billboard)	46

2024 year-end chart performance for "Rhyme Dust"
Chart (2024)	Position
Australian Artist (ARIA)	33
Australia Dance (ARIA)	23

== Certifications ==
Certifications for "Rhyme Dust"
Region	Certification	Certified units/sales
Australia (ARIA)	Platinum	70,000^{‡}
New Zealand (RMNZ)	Platinum	30,000^{‡}
United Kingdom (BPI)	Silver	200,000^{‡}
^{‡} Sales+streaming figures based on certification alone.
