= Eat Your Man =

2023 single by Dom Dolla and Nelly Furtado

Single by Dom Dolla and Nelly Furtado
- Released: 2 June 2023
- Recorded: 2023
- Genre: Tech house
- Length: 3:17
- Label: Three Six Zero, Sony Music
- Songwriters: Dominic Matheson; Nelly Furtado; Anjulie Persaud
- Producer: Dom Dolla

Dom Dolla singles chronology
"Rhyme Dust" (2023)	"Eat Your Man" (2023)	"Saving Up" (2023)

Nelly Furtado singles chronology
"Sticks & Stones" (2018)	"Eat Your Man" (2023)	"Keep Going Up" (2023)

"Eat Your Man" is a song by Australian record producer Dom Dolla and Canadian singer and songwriter, Nelly Furtado. It was released on 2 June 2023.

At the 2023 ARIA Music Awards, the song was nominated for Best Produced Release and Best Engineered Release, while Dom Dolla was nominated for Best Solo Artist. It was nominated for Dance Recording of the Year at the 2024 Juno Awards and House Song of the Year and Best Collaboration at the 2024 Electronic Dance Music Awards. The song is featured in the 2026 video game "Grand Theft Auto VI".

== Background ==
Dom Dolla and Furtado met at the Beyond The Valley Festival in January 2023 and shared a stage performing "Glue" (by Bicep) and Furtado's "Say It Right". This followed Furtado's New Year's Eve performance in Australia, days before which was her first set in five years.

Dom Dolla said "Nelly first reached out to me after we were both booked to play Beyond The Valley Festival. She'd discovered my music not long before and was into what she heard. We immediately hit it off." Furtado was writing some new music and wanted his help as a producer. Dom Dolla continued, "After a few days of writing she mentioned she would love to work on a club record together, and we began to put some ideas down, Not long after, 'Eat Your Man' was born."

Furtado said the song's creation took place on Valentine's Day 2023 with the first ideas coming together on a drive to a Philadelphia recording studio. Her friend and fellow passenger Anjulie Persaud suggested the lyrics harken back to Furtado's older hits. Furtado told Dom Dolla that she wanted a song that "Mr. Beach will party to at 4 a.m."

In May 2023, Furtado confirmed she was working on new music, saying "I have so much music. I've recorded a hundred songs in the last 18 months, and I'm so excited to bring people new music." On 26 May 2023, Furtado announced the release of "Eat Your Man" on her social media accounts.

== Critical reception ==
Jason Heffler from EDM wrote: "Eerie synths slither into focus before Furtado's unapologetic flow takes center stage. 'I'll eat your man, devour him whole', warns a badass Furtado, invoking 2006's generational "Maneater". Underneath, a thick bass-line slices through like a hot knife through butter, carving through an infectious house beat."

Music-News felt that "'Eat Your Man' connects two worlds, and confirms two facts: Nelly Furtado is back, and Dom Dolla is at the top of his game", adding that "It showcases a distinct Dom Dolla production and Nelly's iconic lyricism."

== Charts ==
=== Weekly charts ===
Weekly chart performance for "Eat Your Man"
Chart (2023)	Peak position
Australia (ARIA)	84
Australia Club Tracks (ARIA)	1
Australia Dance (ARIA)	6
Canada CHR/Top 40 (Billboard)	28
Canada Digital Song Sales (Billboard)	25
Netherlands Club (Dutch Top 40)	1
New Zealand Hot Singles (RMNZ)	13
UK Singles Downloads (Official Charts)	81
US Hot Dance/Electronic Songs (Billboard)	15

=== Year-end charts ===
Year-end chart performance for "Eat Your Man"
Chart (2023)	Position
Australian Artist (ARIA)	49
US Hot Dance/Electronic Songs (Billboard)	73
Chart (2024)	Position
Australian Artist (ARIA)	39

== Certifications ==
Certifications for "Eat Your Man"
Region	Certification	Certified units/sales
Australia (ARIA)	Platinum	70,000^{‡}
Canada (Music Canada)	Gold	40,000^{‡}
New Zealand (RMNZ)	Gold	15,000^{‡}
^{‡} Sales+streaming figures based on certification alone.
