= Good Enough (G Flip song) =

2023 single by G Flip

Single by G Flip

from the album Drummer
- Released: 11 August 2023
- Length: 3:02
- Label: Future Classic
- Songwriters: Georgia Flipo; Aidan Hogg
- Producers: Georgia Flipo; Colin Brittain; Aidan Hogg

G Flip singles chronology
"The Worst Person Alive" (2023)	"Good Enough" (2023)	"Australia" (2023)

Music video
- "Good Enough" on YouTube

"Good Enough" is a song by Australian indie pop singer G Flip. It was released on 11 August 2023 as the third single from their second studio album, Drummer.

In an interview with XS Noise, G Flip said "'Good Enough' is about not feeling good enough for someone that you know deserves the world. Sometimes, you love someone, but you aren't in the right headspace to love them the way they deserve. It's a tough thing to admit to yourself and even harder to say out loud."

At the 2023 ARIA Music Awards, the Kyle Caulfield directed video won the ARIA Award for Best Video.

== Reception ==
Lisa Hafey from Essentially Pop said "With thunderous, hip-swiveling rhythms, impassioned vocals, and a full sonic spectrum of instruments… 'Good Enough' is set to become a modern classic."

== Charts ==
Chart performance for "Good Enough"
Chart (2023)	Peak position
New Zealand Hot Singles (RMNZ)	37
