= Drink Too Much =

2019 single by G Flip

Single by G Flip

from the album About Us
- Released: 18 January 2019
- Length: 3:40
- Label: Future Classic
- Songwriters: Georgia Flipo; Kaelyn Behr
- Producers: Georgia Flipo; Styalz Fuego

G Flip singles chronology
"Bring Me Home" (2019)	"Drink Too Much" (2019)	"I Am Not Afraid" (2019)

Music video
- "Drink Too Much" on YouTube

"Drink Too Much" is a song by Australian indie pop singer G Flip. It was released on 18 January 2019 as the fourth single from their debut studio album, About Us (2019). The song peaked at number 72 on the ARIA charts and was certified double platinum in February 2024. The song was voted number 6 in the Triple J Hottest 100, 2019.

At the 2019 ARIA Music Awards, the song's video was nominated for Best Video.

== Charts ==
Chart performance for "Drink Too Much"
Chart (2019–2020)	Peak position
Australia (ARIA)	72

== Certifications ==
Certifications and sales for "Drink Too Much"
Region	Certification	Certified units/sales
Australia (ARIA)	2× Platinum	140,000^{‡}
^{‡} Sales+streaming figures based on certification alone.
