= Killing My Time =

2018 single by G Flip

Single by G Flip

from the album About Us
- Released: 16 May 2018
- Length: 3:37
- Label: Future Classic
- Songwriter(s): Georgia Flipo; Kaelyn Behr
- Producer(s): Georgia Flipo; Styalz Fuego

G Flip singles chronology
"About You" (2018)	"Killing My Time" (2018)	"Bring Me Home" (2019)

Music video
- "Killing My Time" on YouTube

"Killing My Time" is a song by Australian indie pop singer G Flip. It was released on 16 May 2018 as the second single from their debut studio album, About Us (2019). The song peaked at number 79 on the ARIA charts and was certified platinum in August 2021.

The song was voted number 62 in the Triple J Hottest 100, 2018.

== Reception ==
Max Lewis from Purple Sneakers said "On the surface, it's a catchy and simplistic track, but her past as a drummer shines through with the booming percussive hits that drive the action."

== Charts ==
Chart performance for "Killing My Time"
Chart (2018)	Peak position
Australia (ARIA)	79

== Certifications ==
Certifications for "Killing My Time"
Region	Certification	Certified units/sales
Australia (ARIA)	Platinum	70,000^{‡}
^{‡} Sales+streaming figures based on certification alone.
