= Drummer (album) =

Studio album by G Flip
- Released: 11 August 2023
- Length: 38:09
- Label: Future Classic
- Producers: Georgia Flipo; Aidan Hogg; Colin Brittain; Stint; Dan Farber; Tommy English; Kyran Daniel

G Flip chronology
About Us (2019)	Drummer (2023)	Dream Ride (2025)

Singles from Drummer
- 1. "Be Your Man" Released: 12 May 2023; 2. "The Worst Person Alive" Released: 28 June 2023; 3. "Good Enough" Released: 11 August 2023; 4. "Australia" Released: 22 September 2023

Drummer is the second studio album by Australian indie pop singer G Flip, released on 11 August 2023 through Future Classic. It was preceded by four singles: "Be Your Man", "The Worst Person Alive", "Good Enough", and "Australia". It debuted atop the ARIA Albums Chart. G Flip toured Australia and North America in support of the album.

== Background ==
The album was announced on 28 June 2023, alongside the album's second single, with G Flip saying "Growing up watching pop music icons, I never saw a solo artist whose main instrument was drums. I wanted to make the album that my kid self dreamed of—a hybrid of pop/rock but with drums out the front. Incorporating groove, tempo, feel and drum moments while still making catchy pop music. I honestly can't wait for you to hear this album in August".

G Flip also said the album is "a stark contrast" from their debut album About Us, saying "I made my first album in my bedroom, surrounded by my instruments. After making my first album, I was thrown into pop sessions where people very rarely had a drum kit or any real instruments in the room. I was shocked that when I had 'made it' the norm was to ditch the live instruments and make everything on laptops... I knew that wasn't me".

== Tour ==
The album was supported by the Drummer tour, commencing in Brisbane on 18 August before a 25-date run in North America.

== Awards ==
At the 2023 ARIA Music Awards, the album was nominated for Album of the Year, Best Independent Release, Best Rock Album and Best Solo Artist.

At the 2023 J Awards, the album won Australian Album of the Year.

The album was nominated for Best Record at the Rolling Stone Australia Awards.

The album was also nominated for Best Album at the 2024 Music Victoria Awards.

== Critical reception ==
Professional ratings
Review scores
Source	Rating
NME	3/5 stars
Rolling Stone Australia	4/5 stars

Writing for NME, Karen Gwee called Drummer a "booming, big-hearted record guided by raw feeling and the instrument that started it all for [G Flip]". Gwee called the record "larger than life" with its production rendering G Flip's debut album About Us "demure by comparison".

Vivienne Kelly from Rolling Stone Australia said "The album also puts G's powerful vocals on display, whether it's through the pained 'The Worst Person Alive', or the passionate 'Be Your Man'" adding "and will likely further cement them as an Australian talent the world is talking about."

Triple J called it "A bold, solo, pop record written with a passion for percussion and embracing one's true self."

== Track listing ==
Drummer track listing
No.	Title	Writer(s)	Producer(s)	Length
1.	"7 Days"	Georgia Flipo; Sarah Aarons; Ajay Bhattacharyya	Flipo; Aidan Hogg; Colin Brittain; Stint	2:52
2.	"The Worst Person Alive"	Flipo; Charlie Brand; Buzz; Hogg	Flipo; Hogg	3:30
3.	"Rough"	Flipo; Brittain; Dan Farber	Flipo; Brittain; Farber	2:51
4.	"Good Enough"	Flipo; Hogg	Flipo; Hogg; Brittain	3:02
5.	"Be Your Man"	Flipo; Farber; Micah Jasper; Jesse Thomas	Flipo; Farber; Hogg	3:32
6.	"Australia"	Flipo; Hogg; Thomas	Flipo; Hogg	3:49
7.	"Baked"	Flipo; Farber	Flipo; Farber	2:39
8.	"Real Life"	Flipo; Aarons; Farber; Adam Midgley	Flipo; Hogg	3:20
9.	"Love Hurts"	Flipo; Tommy English	Flipo; English; Hogg; Farber	3:28
10.	"Kevin"	Flipo; Farber	Flipo; Farber	2:20
11.	"Didn't Mean To"	Flipo; Nick Ferraro; Jeff Hazin; Midi Jones	Flipo; Hogg	2:41
12.	"Made for You"	Flipo; Kaelyn Bahr; Jesse Thomas	Flipo; Hogg; Kyran Daniel	4:00
Total length:				38:09

== Charts ==
=== Weekly charts ===
Weekly chart performance for Drummer
Chart (2023)	Peak position
Australian Albums (ARIA)	1

=== Year-end charts ===
Year-end chart performance for Drummer
Chart (2023)	Position
Australian Artist Albums (ARIA)	29
Chart (2024)	Position
Australian Artist Albums (ARIA)	25
