= Bed on Fire =

2025 single by G Flip

Single by G Flip

from the album Dream Ride
- Released: 5 September 2025
- Length: 3:33
- Label: G Flip; AWAL
- Songwriters: Georgia Flipo; Aidan Hogg; Steph Marziano; Jesse Thomas
- Producers: Georgia Flipo; Aidan Hogg

G Flip singles chronology
| "In Another Life" (2025) | "Bed on Fire" (2025) | "Lez Go!" (2026) |

Music video
- "Bed on Fire" on YouTube

"Bed on Fire" is a song by Australian indie pop singer G Flip. It was released alongside the Dream Ride album on 5 September 2025 as the album's fourth and final single.

G Flip described it as being " all about the angst I grew up feeling going to Catholic school, having my first experience with a woman, and being like, 'I'm bloody high off this love I shouldn't be having. It's saying, 'Well, if I'm going to hell anyway, I'm going to set this place or the bed ablaze with my queerness.'"

The song polled at number 74 on Triple J's Hottest 100 of 2025.

In May 2026, "Bed on Fire" gained new attention upon its usage in the fifth episode of the first season of the Amazon Prime Video series Off Campus. G Flip remarked that it had resulted in "the most streams I've ever had in a day of my whole career." It saw the song debut at number 48 on the ARIA Singles Charts, becoming their first to enter the top 50.

At the 2026 ARIA Music Awards it won Best Video and was also nominated for Song of the Year.

== Reception ==
Reviewing Dream Ride for Future Mag Music, Brooke Gibbs wrote that "'Bed on Fire' burns brightest as the album's emotional center piece."

== Charts ==
Chart performance for "Bed on Fire"
| Chart (2025–2026) | Peak position |
|---|---|
| Australia (ARIA) | 28 |
| Ireland (IRMA) | 97 |
| New Zealand Hot Singles (RMNZ) | 34 |
| UK Singles (Official Charts) | 91 |
| UK Independent (Official Charts) | 23 |
| US Hot Rock & Alternative Songs (Billboard) | 46 |

== Certifications ==
Certifications and sales for "Bed on Fire"
| Region | Certification | Certified units/sales |
|---|---|---|
| Australia (ARIA) | Gold | 35,000^{‡} |
^{‡} Sales+streaming figures based on certification alone.
