= Saving Up =

2023 single by Dom Dolla

Single by Dom Dolla
- Released: 6 October 2023
- Recorded: 2023
- Genre: House; disco
- Length: 3:27
- Label: Three Six Zero; Sony Music
- Songwriters: Dominic Matheson; Clementine Douglas; Toby Scott; Caitlin Stubbs
- Producers: Dom Dolla, Toby Scott

Dom Dolla singles chronology
"Eat Your Man" (2023)	"Saving Up" (2023)	"Girls" (2024)

"Saving Up" is a song by Australian record producer Dom Dolla released on 6 October 2023. The song features uncredited vocals by Clementine Douglas.

About the track, Dom Dolla said he "wanted to write a feel-good record, reminding [himself] of the importance of saving time for the ones [he cares] about and love."

Upon released, Dolla said "So excited to finally be releasing this one... it's a happy little banger I've been sneaking it into my sets over the last 12 months. A lot of you have been singing the words to it at my shows, which makes me feel like it’s the right time."

At the 2024 ARIA Music Awards, the song was nominated for Song of the Year, Best Dance/Electronic Release, Best Dance/Electronic Release, Best Produced Release, Best Engineered Release and for Dolla, Best Solo Artist. it won Best Dance Release.

At the APRA Music Awards of 2025, the song was shortlisted for Song of the Year. It was nominated for Most Performed Australian Work and won Most Performed Dance/Electronic Work

== Critical reception ==
Brooke Bierman from EDM said "The track embodies the essence of feel-good disco and house. Weaving together uplifting synths, soulful vocals and an infectious house beat, 'Saving Up' radiates warmth and explores the idea of saving time for loved ones."

Jessie Lynch from Purple Sneakers said The track explores the theme of prioritising relationships with loved ones over the relentless pursuit of personal fortunes, urging us all to save time for the people we hold dear. The track has a unique quality, akin to a sample but entirely original. It captures the essence of disco and house music, making it a perfect addition to Dom Dolla's already impressive musical repertoire.

== Versions ==
Digital download

- "Saving Up" – 3:17
- "Saving Up" (Loods remix) – 3:30
- "Saving Up" (LF System remix) – 3:13
- "Saving Up" (Odd Mob remix) – 3:13

== Charts ==
=== Weekly charts ===
Weekly chart performance for "Saving Up"
Chart (2023–2024)	Peak position
Australia (ARIA)	10
Australia Club Tracks (ARIA)	1
Netherlands Club (Dutch Top 40)	2
New Zealand (Recorded Music NZ)	33
UK Singles Downloads (OCC)	78
US Hot Dance/Electronic Songs (Billboard)	25

=== Year-end charts ===
Year-end chart performance for "Saving Up"
Chart (2024)	Position
Australia (ARIA)	50
Australia Dance (ARIA)	3
US Hot Dance/Electronic Songs (Billboard)	86
Chart (2025)	Position
Australian Artist (ARIA)	21

== Certifications ==
Certifications for "Saving Up"
Region	Certification	Certified units/sales
Australia (ARIA)	3× Platinum	210,000^{‡}
New Zealand (RMNZ)	Platinum	30,000^{‡}
^{‡} Sales+streaming figures based on certification alone.

== See also ==
- List of Billboard number-one dance songs of 2023
- List of number-one club tracks of 2023 (Australia)
