= Take It =

Single by Dom Dolla
- Released: 27 July 2018
- Length: 3:54
- Label: Sweat It Out
- Songwriter: Dominic Matheson

Dom Dolla singles chronology
"Be Randy" (2017)	"Take It" (2018)	"San Frandisco" (2019)

Music video
- "Take It" on YouTube

"Take It" is a song by Australian house music producer Dom Dolla. It was released in July 2018.

At the ARIA Music Awards of 2019, the song was nominated for Best Dance Release. At the APRA Music Awards of 2020, the song was nominated for Most Performed Dance Work of the Year.

== Reception ==
Billboard called the song "one spicy funk jam" saying "The Australian producer's runaway hit uses trippy melodies, jackin' rhythm and toe-curling synth bass to burrow into your brain and make your whole body move."

== Track listing ==
Digital download (SWEATDS336)

1. "Take It" – 3:54

Digital download (remixes) (SWEATDS338DJ)

1. "Take It" (Billy Kenny Remix) – 5:18
2. "Take It" (Wongo Remix) – 5:10
3. "Take It" (ZDS Remix) – 6:40
4. "Take It" (Jay Robinson Remix) – 4:45
5. "Take It" (Holmes John Remix) – 4:21

Digital download (Sonny Fodera remix)

1. "Take It" – 3:40

== Charts ==
=== Weekly charts ===
Weekly chart performance for "Take It"
Chart (2018–2019)	Peak position
Australia Club (ARIA Charts)	1
Belgium (Ultratip Bubbling Under Flanders)	41
Hungary (Dance Top 40)	18

=== Year-end charts ===
Year-end chart performance for "Take It"
Chart (2019)	Position
Hungary (Dance Top 40)	60

== Certifications ==
Certifications for "Take It"
Region	Certification	Certified units/sales
Australia (ARIA)	Platinum	70,000^{‡}
Canada (Music Canada)	Gold	40,000^{‡}
New Zealand (RMNZ)	Platinum	30,000^{‡}
^{‡} Sales+streaming figures based on certification alone.

== See also ==
- List of number-one club tracks of 2018 (Australia)
