= Dom Dolla =

Australian house music producer (born 1992)

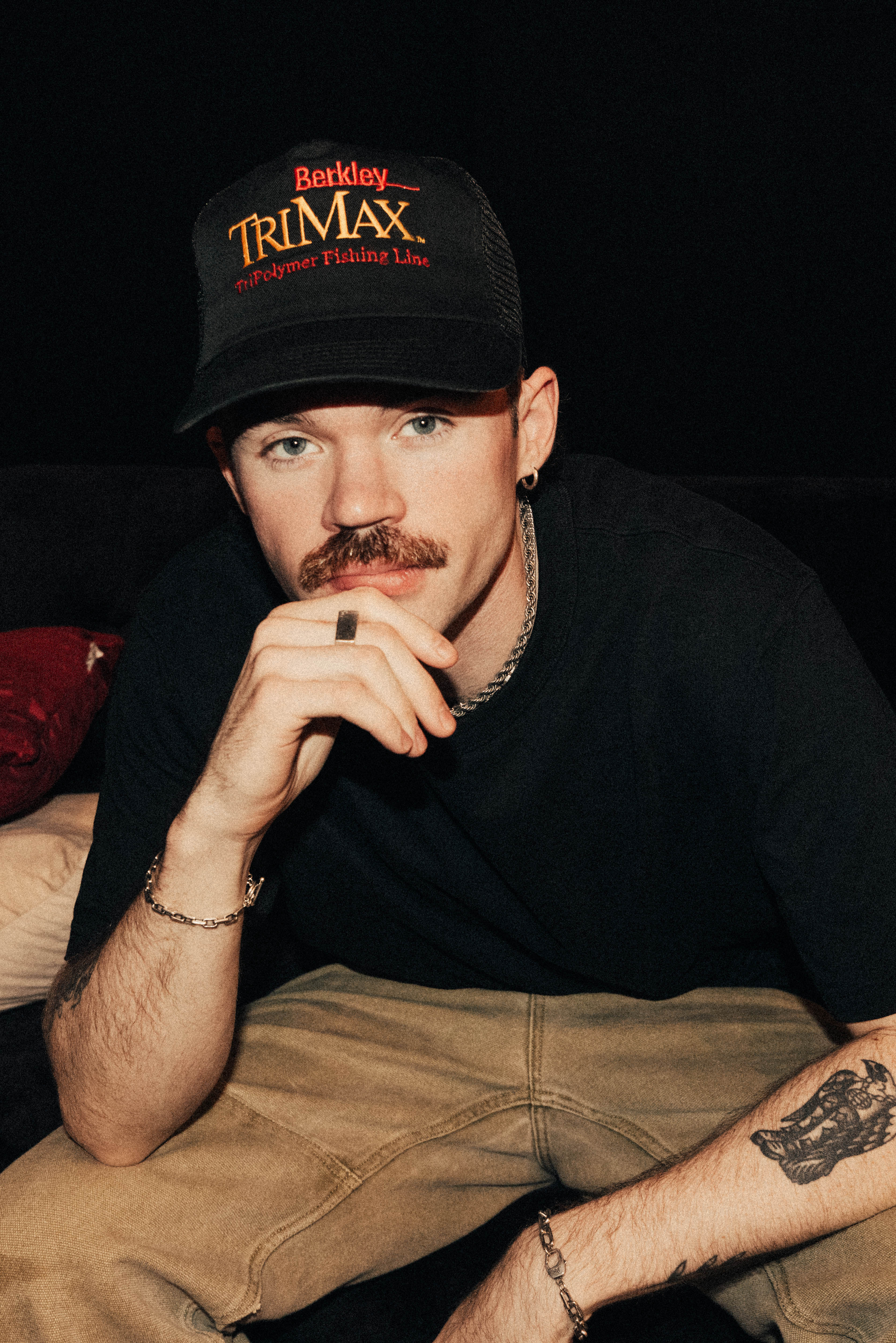
- Dom Dolla in 2024

Background information
- Born: Dominic Louis Matheson; 18 January 1992 (age 34); Manila, Philippines
- Origin: Melbourne, Victoria, Australia
- Genres: Tech house; house; electronic
- Occupations: DJ; music producer; songwriter
- Instrument: Digital audio workstation
- Years active: 2013–present
- Labels: Onelove (2013–2015), Sweat It Out (2015–2021), Three Six Zero Recordings / Sony Music (2022–present)
- Website: domdolla.com

Dominic Louis Matheson (born 18 January 1992), better known by his stage name Dom Dolla, is an Australian tech house producer, DJ, songwriter and remixer, acclaimed for his special house music style and high-profile collaborations. He has been nominated eight times for the ARIA Award for Best Dance Release; Including: in 2017 for "Be Randy", with Torren Foot and in 2019, for the song "Take It". He won the award at the 2020 ARIA Music Awards for the song "San Frandisco" and in 2023 for the song "Rhyme Dust" (with MK). He was a Grammy Award nominee in 2024 for the song "New Gold" featuring Gorillaz, Tame Impala and Bootie Brown, and a Juno Award nominee in 2024 for the song "Eat Your Man" featuring Nelly Furtado.

He has performed in festivals such as Coachella 2022 and Lollapalooza 2023. Dom has sold out such venues as Red Rocks Amphitheatre in Denver, Colorado, Sidney Myer Music Bowl in Melbourne, Australia and Forest Hills Stadium in New York.

In December 2025, Dom Dolla performed in front of 40,000 at Sydney's Allianz Stadium, becoming the first electronic act to headline an Australian stadium show.

== Early life ==
Dom Dolla was born in Manila, Philippines to Australian parents and raised in Darwin, Northern Territory, Australia. He moved to Melbourne when he was a teenager and discovered house and electronic music. Dolla went to Kew High School.

After high school, Dom Dolla originally went off to study design, specifically in typography and logo design. However, his now manager, James, convinced him to quit design to pursue music creation full time.

== Career ==
=== 2013–present ===
In 2013 Dom Dolla released his debut single "The Boxer". In March 2015, Dolla released "Love Like This". In July 2015, Dolla released the song "Define" with Go Freek. The song was number 2 in the ARIA Club End Of Year Chart.

In July 2015 Dolla released "Define", which reached number one on the ARIA Club Chart. In September 2016, Dolla released "You" which reached number one again on the ARIA Club Chart in October 2016. In August 2017, Dolla reached number one again on the ARIA Club Chart with "Be Randy" with Torren Foot. At the ARIA Music Awards of 2017, the song was nominated for ARIA Award for Best Dance Release, losing out to "Chameleon" by Pnau.

In October 2018, Dolla reached number one for the fourth time on the ARIA Club Chart with "Take It". At the ARIA Music Awards of 2019, the song was nominated for ARIA Award for Best Dance Recording, losing out to Solace by Rüfüs Du Sol.

In November 2019, Dolla reached number one for the fifth time on the ARIA Club Chart with "San Frandisco". In January 2020, the song polled at number 33 in the Triple J Hottest 100, 2019.

In August 2020, Dolla reached number one for the sixth time on the ARIA Club Chart with "Moving Blind".

In March 2023, Dolla reached number one for the seventh time on the ARIA Club Chart with "Rhyme Dust".

In June 2023, Dolla reached number one for the eighth time on the ARIA Club Chart with "Eat Your Man".

In October 2023, Dolla reached number one for the ninth time on the ARIA Club Chart with "Saving Up".

In June 2024, Dolla reached number one for the tenth time on the ARIA Club Chart with "Girls".

In March 2025, Dolla reached number one for the Eleventh time on the ARIA Club Chart with "Dreamin'".

In October 2026, Dolla reached number one for the Twelfth time on the ARIA Club Chart with "Danger Danger".

== Discography ==
=== Singles ===
List of singles, with year released and album details shown
Title	Year	Peak chart positions							Certifications	Album
Title	Year	AUS	AUS Club	BEL (FL)	IRE	NZ Hot	UK	US Dance	Certifications	Album
"The Boxer"	2013	—	—	—	—	—	—	—		Non-album singles
"Love Like This"	2015	—	—	—	—	—	—	—		Non-album singles
"Define" (with Go Freek)	2015	—	1	—	—	—	—	—	ARIA: Gold; RMNZ: Gold	Non-album singles
"You"	2016	—	1	—	—	—	—	—	ARIA: Gold	Non-album singles
"Be Randy" (with Torren Foot)	2017	—	1	—	—	—	—	—		Non-album singles
"Take It"	2018	—	1	41	—	—	—	—	ARIA: Platinum; RMNZ: Platinum	Non-album singles
"San Frandisco"	2019	—	1	90	—	37	—	40	ARIA: Platinum; RMNZ: Gold	Non-album singles
"Moving Blind" (with Sonny Fodera)	2020	—	1	—	—	39	—	—	ARIA: Gold	Non-album singles
"Pump the Brakes"	2021	—	2	66	—	37	—	33	ARIA: Gold	Non-album singles
"Strangers" (with Mansionair)	2021	—	—	—	—	—	—	—		Happiness, Guaranteed.
"Miracle Maker" (featuring Clementine Douglas)	2022	—	2	—	—	13	—	35	ARIA: Gold; RMNZ: Gold	Non-album singles
"Rhyme Dust" (with MK)	2023	32	1	—	32	4	63	9	ARIA: Platinum; BPI: Silver; RMNZ: Platinum	Non-album singles
"Eat Your Man" (with Nelly Furtado)	2023	84	1	—	—	13	—	15	ARIA: Platinum	Non-album singles
"Saving Up"	2023	10	1	—	—	4	—	25	ARIA: 3× Platinum; RMNZ: Platinum	Non-album singles
"Girls"	2024	71	1	—	—	7	—	22	ARIA: Platinum	Non-album singles
"Cave" (with Tove Lo)	2024	—	39	—	—	9	—	29	ARIA: Gold	Non-album singles
"Dreamin'" (featuring Daya)	2025	33	1	—	—	—	—	5	ARIA: Platinum	Non-album singles
"Forever" (with Kid Cudi)	2025	—	—	—	—	4	—	9		Non-album singles
"No Room for a Saint" (with Nathan Nicholson)	2025	—	—	—	—	13	—	23		F1 the Album
"Addicted to Bass" (with Puretone) (Dom Dolla Relapse)	2026	— (Note: "Addicted to Bass" did not enter the ARIA top 100 Singles Chart, but peaked at number 3 on the Australian Artist Chart.)	2	—	—	—	—	—		Non-album singles
"Don't Worry Baby" (with Tiga)	2026	— (Note: "Don't Worry Baby" did not enter the ARIA top 100 Singles Chart, but peaked at number 12 on the Australian Artist Chart.)	12	—	—	13	—	—		Non-album singles
"Danger Danger" (with Solomun and Skepta)	2026	69	1	—	—	5	—	20		Non-album singles
"—" denotes a recording that did not chart or was not released.

== Awards and nominations ==
=== AIR Awards ===
The AIR Awards celebrates the highest-selling Australian independent artists annualal. Dom Dolla has been nominated for three awards.

Year	Nominee / work	Award	Result	Ref.
2019	"Take It"	Best Independent Dance, Electronica or Club Single	Nominated	
2020	"San Frandisco"	Best Independent Single	Nominated	
2020	"San Frandisco"	Best Independent Dance, Electronica or Club Single	Won	

=== APRA Awards ===
The APRA Awards are held in Australia and New Zealand by the Australasian Performing Right Association to recognise songwriting skills, sales and airplay performance by its members annually. Dom Dolla has been nominated for one award.

Year	Nominee / work	Award	Result	Ref.
2020	"Take It"	Most Performed Dance Work of the Year	Nominated	
2021	"San Frandisco"	Most Performed Dance Work of the Year	Nominated	
2024	"Miracle Maker" (featuring Clementine Douglas)	Most Performed Dance/Electronic Work	Nominated	
2025	"Saving Up"	Song of the Year	Shortlisted	
2025	"Saving Up"	Most Performed Australian Work	Nominated	
2025	"Saving Up"	Most Performed Dance/Electronic Work	Won	
2026	"Cave" (with Tove Lo)	Most Performed Dance/Electronic Work	Nominated	

=== ARIA Music Awards ===
The ARIA Music Awards are annual awards, which recognises excellence, innovation, and achievement across all genres of Australian music. Dom Dolla has won four awards from twenty-four nominations.

Year	Nominee / work	Award	Result	Ref.
2017	"Be Randy" (with Torren Foot)	Best Dance Release	Nominated	
2019	"Take It"	Best Dance Release	Nominated	
2020	"San Frandisco"	Best Dance Release	Won	
2021	"Pump the Brakes"	Best Dance Release	Nominated	
2023	"Eat Your Man" (featuring Nelly Furtado)	Best Solo Artist	Nominated	
2023	"Rhyme Dust" (with MK)	Best Dance/Electronic Release	Won	
2023	"Rhyme Dust" (with MK)	Song of the Year	Nominated	
2023	Dom Dolla Australian Summer Festival Tour	Best Australian Live Act	Nominated	
2023	Dom Dolla for Dom Dolla – "Eat Your Man"	Best Produced Release	Nominated	
2023	Dom Dolla for Dom Dolla – "Eat Your Man"	Best Engineered Release	Nominated	
2024	"Saving Up"	Best Solo Artist	Nominated	
2024	"Saving Up"	Best Dance/Electronic Release	Won	
2024	"Saving Up"	Song of the Year	Nominated	
2024	Dom Dolla for Dom Dolla – "Saving Up"	Best Produced Release	Nominated	
2024	Dom Dolla for Dom Dolla – "Saving Up"	Best Engineered Release	Nominated	
2024	Dom Dolla Australian Tour 2023	Best Australian Live Act	Nominated	
2025	"Dreamin'"	Best Solo Artist	Nominated	
2025	"Dreamin'"	Best Dance/Electronic Release	Won	
2025	"Dreamin'"	Best Video	Nominated	
2025	"Dreamin'"	Song of the Year	Nominated	
2025	Dom Dolla for "Dreamin'"	Best Engineered Release	Nominated	
2025	Dom Dolla for "Dreamin'"	Best Produced Release	Nominated	
2025	Dom Dolla Australia 2024	Best Australian Live Act	Nominated	
2025	Dom Dolla	Global Impact Award	awarded	
2026	"Addicted to Bass" (with Puretone)	Best Dance/Electronic Release	Nominated	
2026	"Addicted to Bass" (with Puretone)	Best Video	Nominated	
2026	Dom Dolla – Australian Tour 2025	Best Australian Live Act	Nominated	
2026	Dom Dolla for Dom Dolla – "Don't Worry Baby"	Best Engineered Release	Nominated	

=== DJ Magazine's top 100 DJs ===
The top 100 DJs is a public poll of the world's 100 most popular DJ by the magazine.

Year	Position	Notes	Ref.
2024	66	New Entry	

=== Electronic Dance Music Awards ===
The Electronic Dance Music Awards are presented by iHeart Radio and commenced in 2022.

Year	Nominee / work	Award	Result	Ref.
2022	"Pump the Brakes"	House Song of the Year	Nominated	
2023	"Miracle Maker" (with Clementine Douglas)	Dance Song of the Year	Nominated	
2023	Dom Dolla	Tech House DJ of the Year	Won	
2024	Dom Dolla	Male Artist of the Year	Nominated	
2024	Dom Dolla	Producer of the Year	Nominated	
2024	Dom Dolla	Dance Radio Artist of the Year	Nominated	
2024	"Eat Your Man" (with Nelly Furtado)	Best Collaboration	Nominated	
2024	"Rhyme Dust" (with MK)	Dance Radio Song of the Year	Nominated	
2025	Dom Dolla	Male Artist of the Year	Nominated	
2025	Dom Dolla	Producer of the Year	Nominated	
2025	Dom Dolla	Dance Radio Artist of the Year	Nominated	
2025	Dom Dolla	Tech House Artist of the Year	Nominated	
2025	"Cave" (with Tove Lo)	Drum and Bass Song of the Year	Nominated	
2025	"Girls$"	Dance Song of the Year	Nominated	
2025	"Girls$"	Tech House Song of the Year	Nominated	
2025	"Girls$"	House Song of the Year	Won	
2026	Dom Dolla	Male Artist of the Year	Nominated	
2026	Dom Dolla	Dance Radio Artist of the Year	Nominated	
2026	Dom Dolla	Tech House Artist of the Year	Nominated	
2026	"Dreamin'" (with Dom Dolla)	Music Video of the Year	Nominated	
2026	"Dreamin'" (with Dom Dolla)	Tech House Song of the Year	Won	
2026	"Dreamin'" (with Dom Dolla) (Anyma remix)	Remix of the Year	Nominated	
2026	John Summit B2B Dom Dolla (Ultra Music Festival 2025)	Favourite B2B	Nominated	

=== Grammy Awards ===
The Grammy Awards are awards presented by the Recording Academy of the United States to recognize "outstanding" achievements in the music industry.

Year	Nominee / work	Award	Result	Ref.
2024	"New Gold" (Dom Dolla Remix)	Best Remixed Recording, Non-Classical	Nominated	

=== Juno Awards ===
The Juno Awards are awards presented by the Canadian Academy of Recording Arts and Sciences to recognize outstanding achievements in Canada's music industry.

Year	Nominee / work	Award	Result	Ref.
2024	"Eat Your Man"	Dance Recording of the Year	Nominated	

=== MPEG Awards ===
The Music Producer and Engineers’ Guild (MPEG Awards) Awards celebrate excellence in music production and engineering in Australia. They commenced in 2024.

Year	Nominee / work	Award	Result (wins only)	Ref.
2025	Dom Dolla	Overseas Achievement	Won	

=== Music Victoria Awards ===
The Music Victoria Awards are an annual awards night celebrating Victorian music. They commenced in 2006.

Year	Nominee / work	Award	Result	Ref.
2017	Dom Dolla	Best Electronic Act	Nominated	

=== Rolling Stone Australia Awards ===
The Rolling Stone Australia Awards are awarded annually by the Australian edition of Rolling Stone magazine for outstanding contributions to popular culture in the previous year.

Year	Nominee / work	Award	Result	Ref.
2024	"Rhyme Dust" (with MK)	Best Single	Nominated	
2024	Dom Dolla	Best New Artist	Won	
2024	Dom Dolla	Rolling Stone Global Award	Nominated	
2025	"girl$"	Best Single	Shortlisted	
2025	Dom Dolla	Best Live Act	Shortlisted	
2025	Dom Dolla	Rolling Stone Global Award	Won	
