= About Us (album) =

Studio album by G Flip
- Released: 30 August 2019
- Genres: Indie rock; pop
- Length: 38:40
- Label: Future Classic
- Producers: Georgia Flipo; Eric J. Dubowsky; Andrei Eremin; Babydaddy; Tony Buchan; Ariel Rechtshaid; Kaelyn Behr; Oscar Solis

G Flip chronology
About Us (2019)	Drummer (2023)

Singles from About Us
- 1. "About You" Released: 2 March 2018; 2. "Killing My Time" Released: 16 May 2018; 3. "Bring Me Home" Released: 15 January 2019; 4. "Drink Too Much" Released: 18 January 2019; 5. "I'm Not Afraid" Released: 23 April 2019; 6. "Stupid" Released: 24 July 2019

About Us is the debut studio album by Australian indie pop singer G Flip. The album was released on 30 August 2019.

Prior to the album's release, the songs were described as about "heartbreak and reconciliation". G Flip said: "I thought about releasing an album a lot growing up, I would sit in the lounge room holding dad's record collection in awe, I was intrigued, I wanted my own. It's a big moment, I'm super stoked to drop my debut."

The album was supported by an Australian tour, commencing in Adelaide on 8 November 2019.

At the ARIA Music Awards of 2019, the album was nominated for two awards; Breakthrough Artist and Best Independent Release, "Drink Too Much" was nominated for Best Video.

At the J Awards of 2019, the album was nominated for Australian Album of the Year.

At the AIR Awards of 2020, the album was nominated for Best Independent Pop Album or EP.

A deluxe version of the album was released on 17 January 2020, featuring 4 live tracks.

== Reception ==
Professional ratings
Review scores
Source	Rating
AllMusic	3/5 stars
Metro News	3/5 stars
The Music AU	4/5 stars
Pitchfork	5.4/10
Sydney Morning Herald	4/5 stars

Simone Ziaziaris from Sydney Morning Herald said "G Flip draws from [their] own personal experiences to sound deeply personal and honest – so much so, that by the end of the album you feel as if you've known [them] for years." adding "Kindling the success of the album is G Flip's talent in building pop-gems out of a simple synth riff, bouncy piano chords and incredibly smooth vocals. It's a skill [G Flip] applies to [their] singles, 'I Am Not Afraid', 'Drink Too Much' and 'Killing My Time', and one [they]'ll no doubt pull off on hits to come."

James d'Apice from The Music said "Thanks to [their] drumming background, rhythm comes naturally to G Flip. That insight is too reductive though. G Flip's real triumph is neither a command of rhythm, nor of melody, but [their] command of character – as an artist, [G Flip] is compelling. As much as About Us might sound like it's about someone else, it's really about our G Flip and the authentic approach [they take] to the world around [them], and to [their] music."

Some Fuamoli from Triple J said "Born out of a concentrated period of chaos, G Flip's debut album is anchored by self-introspection and raw emotion." and described About Us as "...a snapshot of young lives in flux; finding your own place in a relationship and with yourself. It's a look at the still-firming personal ground of any 20-something."

Zoë Radas from Stack Magazine said "For someone as obsessed with rhythm as G Flip, [they] also [have] a falcon's grip on melodic pop hooks which are both meaty and fluid as rain. [Their] vocals can belt boldly or come in ultra-close, as in the exhilarating single 'Bring Me Home'".

David Bennun from Metro News said "About Us, which details a relationship with an on-off girlfriend, is typified by big percussion and great washes of keyboards, topped with an insinuating croon that feels not as fully [their] own as the music behind it."

Heather Phares from AllMusic said "Flipo finds ways to give About Us more personality whenever [their] tales of lust and heartache could become generic... [and] by the time the album closes with the happily ever after of '2 Million', Flipo proves that in love and in [their] music, [they're] never less than fully committed -- and that's what makes About Us a promising debut."

== Track listing ==
No.	Title	Writer(s)	Length
1.	"Lover"	Georgia Flipo; Elliott Margin; Sam Margin	3:27
2.	"I Am Not Afraid"	Georgia Flipo; Ariel Rechtshaid; Alister Wright	3:46
3.	"Drink Too Much"	Georgia Flipo; Kaelyn Behr	3:40
4.	"Morning"	Georgia Flipo	3:57
5.	"Waking Up Tomorrow"	Georgia Flipo; Kayla Bonnici; Sam Sakr	4:17
6.	"Stupid"	Georgia Flipo; Daniel Kyriakides; Justin Tranter	3:26
7.	"Killing My Time"	Georgia Flipo; Behr	3:37
8.	"Bring Me Home"	Georgia Flipo; Joel Quartermain	4:38
9.	"About You"	Georgia Flipo	4:07
10.	"2 Million"	Georgia Flipo; Scott Hoffman	3:45
Total length:			38:40

Deluxe Edition
No.	Title	Writer(s)	Length
11.	"Morning" (Live and acoustic)	Flipo	4:04
12.	"Stupid" (Live with string quartet)	Flipo; Kyriakides; Tranter	3:57
13.	"About You" (Live and acoustic)	Flipo	5:18
14.	"2 Million" (Live with choir)	Flipo; Hoffman	3:52

== Charts ==
=== Weekly charts ===
Chart (2019)	Peak position
Australian Albums (ARIA)	6

=== Year-end charts ===
Chart (2019)	Position
Australian Artist Albums (ARIA)	33
Chart (2020)	Position
Australian Albums (ARIA)	88

== Release history ==
Region	Date	Format(s)	Label	Catalogue	Version
Australia	30 August 2019	CD; digital download; vinyl; streaming	Future Classic	FCL275CD / FCL275LP	Standard
Australia	17 January 2020	digital download; streaming	Future Classic		Deluxe Edition
