= G Flip =

Australian musician (born 1993)

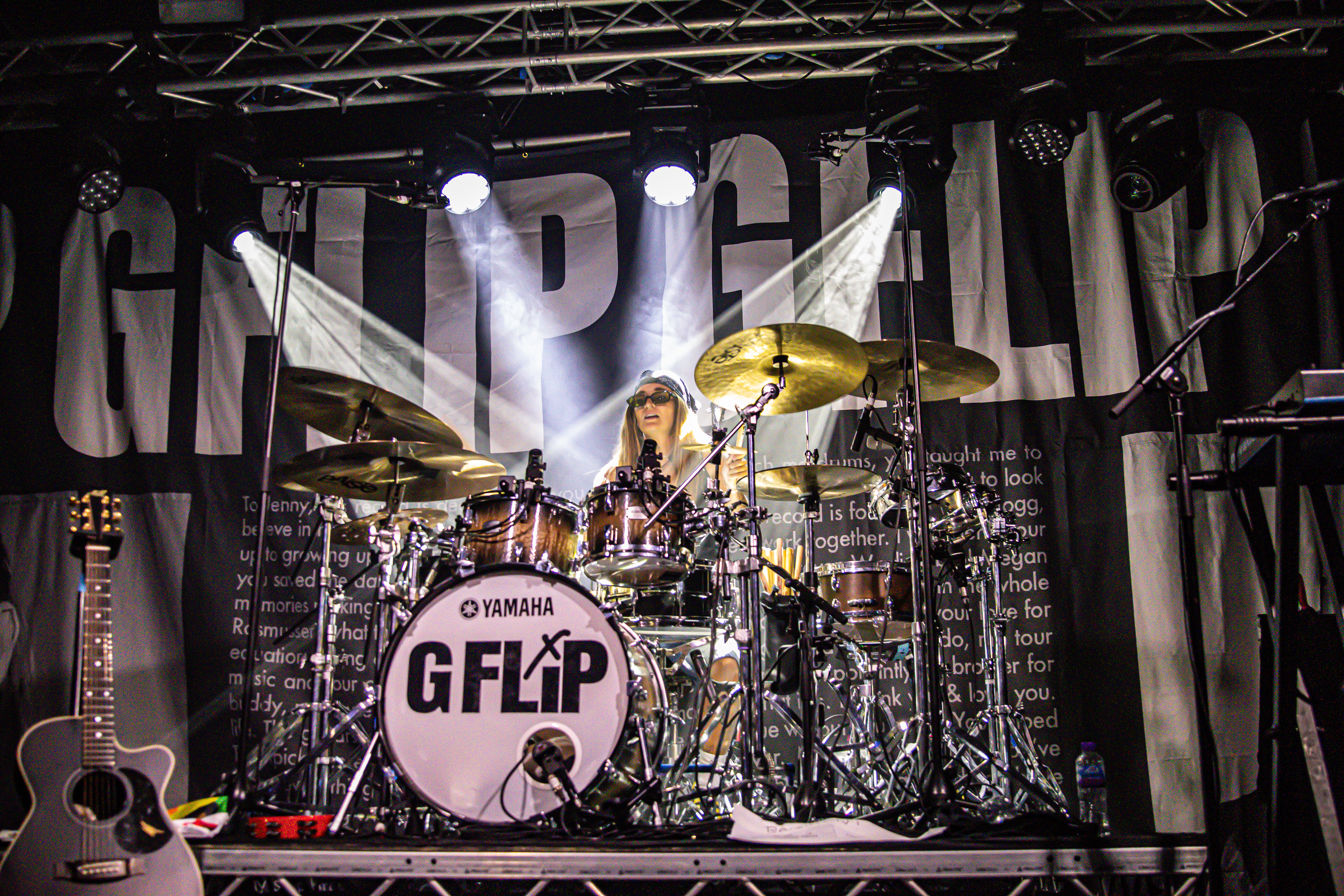
- G Flip performing on Drummer Tour in 2024

Background information
- Born: Georgia Claire Flipo; 22 September 1993 (age 33); St Kilda, Victoria, Australia
- Genres: Pop; indie pop
- Occupation: Musician
- Instruments: Vocals; drums; guitar; bass guitar; piano; keyboards; percussion
- Years active: 2018–present
- Label: Future Classic
- Spouse: Chrishell Stause (m. 2022; sep. 2026)

Georgia Claire Flipo (born 22 September 1993), known professionally as G Flip, is an Australian singer, songwriter, multi-instrumentalist and producer from Melbourne, Victoria. Their debut studio album, About Us, was released on 30 August 2019. Its follow-up, Drummer, followed almost four years later on 11 August 2023.

G Flip has released several platinum-charting singles, including "Killing My Time" and "Drink Too Much", while Drummer topped the ARIA Albums Chart the week of its release. G Flip's music has found itself particularly popular with listeners of Australian radio station triple j: Drummer won the 2023 J Award for Australian Album Of The Year, and seven songs from it were voted into that year's Hottest 100 countdown – setting the record for the most entries by a single artist in one countdown, with G Flip ranking in equal third place for most Triple J Hottest 100 entries of all time.

== Early life and education ==
Georgia Claire Flipo attended kindergarten at Farm Road Pre-School in Cheltenham, Victoria, primary school at Our Lady of the Assumption Primary School (OLA) in Cheltenham, Victoria and secondary school at Star of the Sea College in Brighton, Victoria, graduating in 2011. G Flip studied a Bachelor of Music Performance at Box Hill Institute.

== Musical career ==
G Flip started playing drums at the age of nine, and percussion still forms a big part of their songwriting process, despite now being a multi-instrumentalist. They said that they "spent most of 2017 holed up in [their] bedroom writing and recording", having previously performed in different Melbourne music acts as a session drummer and occasional backup vocalist.

They then decided to adopt the name "G Flip" (derived from their father's nickname as "Mr Flip") as their stage name and try their hand at going solo. In February 2018, they uploaded their debut single "About You" to Triple J Unearthed and that same day their track was premiered on Triple J. The song was officially released on 2 March 2018. Pitchfork named it "Best New Track" and the music video, filmed on their iPhone, was featured in YouTube's New Music Playlist. This piqued international interest, and G Flip was subsequently invited to play their first ever solo show at SXSW in Austin, Texas the following month. G Flip's follow up track "Killing My Time" was released in May 2018. In November, G Flip was nominated for a J Award as Unearthed Artist of the Year and was the inaugural winner of the ARIA Emerging Artist Scholarship. In December, G Flip performed "Proud Mary" and "Blame It on the Boogie" at the ABC's "The Night is Yours" New Year's Eve Celebration 2018 at the Sydney Opera House, and their song "About You" was featured in Season 2, Episode 10 of The Bold Type.

In January 2019, "About You" polled at number 38 and "Killing My Time" at number 62 in the 2018 Triple J Hottest 100. In July 2019, G Flip won Breakthrough Independent Artist of the Year at the Australian Independent Record Labels Association (AIR) Awards. Their debut studio album was released on 30 August 2019. G Flip worked with Ariel Rechtshaid on their track "I Am Not Afraid". Rechtshaid noted to Rolling Stone that "G Flip is a phenomenal musician... [they're] a strong songwriter and [have] a very authentic voice, and [they're] a badass producer."

In January 2020, "Drink Too Much" polled at number 6, "Lover" at number 58, "Stupid" at number 66, "I Am Not Afraid" at number 77 in the 2019 Triple J Hottest 100. In 2021, G Flip performed in Troye Sivan's live version of the song "In a Dream" playing drums in the video. They released a new single "Waste of space" on 14 July 2022. On 28 June 2023, G Flip announced that their second studio album, Drummer, would be released on 11 August 2023. The album, on which all 11 songs were co-produced and co-written by G Flip, was released on that date. It was nominated for Album of the Year, Best Independent Release, Best Rock Album and Best Solo Artist at the 2023 ARIA Music Awards, and won Australian Album of the Year at the 2023 J Awards.

In September 2025, G Flip released their third studio album, Dream Ride, preceded by the singles "Disco Cowgirl", "Big Ol' Hammer" and "In Another Life". G Flip taught themself to play the saxophone for the Dream Ride tour. "Bed on Fire", a song from the album, drew significant international attention after its use in the Amazon Prime Video hockey romance series Off Campus (2026). They were subsequently invited to perform at the 2026 NHL Heritage Classic on October 25.

== Other activities ==
G Flip designed and released two sell-out collaborations with Crocs shoe manufacturers in 2020 and 2021. The shoe ranges included custom-designed "Jibbitz™ charms that adorn each pair... designed to represent little pieces of G Flip's life". Both ranges sold out in minutes. In July 2024, G Flip launched a new project and entered the alcoholic drinks market with Box Alcoholic Juice available in Australia at BWS stores nationally.

== Personal life ==
Flipo is informally referred to as simply "G". They are non-binary and use they / them pronouns.

Flipo dated former Bachelorette and media personality Brooke Blurton throughout 2021.

In May 2022, American actress Chrishell Stause confirmed that she had begun a relationship with Flipo. Following a year of dating, Flipo and Stause announced that they had married in a private ceremony on 10 May 2023. The pair announced the end of their relationship on 27 October 2026.

Flipo has been an avid Collingwood Football Club supporter since an early age and is a prominent supporter of both Australian rules football and AFL Women's. They have performed at two AFL Women's Grand Finals—in 2021 at Adelaide Oval and in 2023 at Ikon Park. They also performed at the 2022 AFL Grand Final as part of the half-time entertainment—becoming the first non-binary person to do so. On 13 August 2025, Filpo's wax figure was unveiled at Madame Tussauds Sydney; in doing so, they were the first non-binary person to have a wax figure displayed at Madame Tussauds.

== Discography ==
- About Us (2019)
- Drummer (2023)
- Dream Ride (2025)

== Awards and nominations ==
=== AIR Awards ===
The annual Australian Independent Record Awards celebrate the success of Australian independent musicians.

Year	Nominee / work	Award	Result	Ref.
2019	G Flip	Breakthrough Independent Artist of the Year	Won	
2020	About Us	Best Independent Pop Album or EP	Nominated	

=== APRA Awards ===
The APRA Awards are held in Australia and New Zealand by the Australasian Performing Right Association to recognise songwriting skills, sales and airplay performance by its members annually.

Year	Nominee / work	Award	Result	Ref.
2024	"Be Your Man"	Song of the Year	Shortlisted	
2024	"The Worst Person Alive"	Song of the Year	Nominated	

=== ARIA Music Awards ===
The ARIA Music Awards is an annual award ceremony event celebrating the Australian music industry. G Flip has been nominated for nine awards.

Year	Nominee / work	Award	Result	Ref.
2019	About Us	Breakthrough Artist	Nominated	
2019	About Us	Best Independent Release	Nominated	
2019	G Flip for "Drink Too Much"	Best Video	Nominated	
2023	Drummer	Album of the Year	Nominated	
2023	Drummer	Best Solo Artist	Nominated	
2023	Drummer	Best Independent Release	Nominated	
2023	Drummer	Best Rock Album	Nominated	
2023	Kyle Caulfield for G Flip – "Good Enough"	Best Video	Won	
2023	Drummer Australian Tour	Best Australian Live Act	Won	
2024	"The Worst Person Alive"	Song of the Year	Won	
2025	"Disco Cowgirl"	Best Pop Release	Nominated	
2026	Dream Ride	Best Solo Artist	Nominated	
2026	Dream Ride	Best Pop Release	Nominated	
2026	G Flip – Paramount+: "All Fired Up" (AFC Women's Asian Cup)	Best Use of an Australian Recording in an Advertisement	Nominated	
2026	Tas Wilson for G Flip – "Bed on Fire"	Best Video	Won	
2026	"Bed on Fire"	Song of the Year	Nominated	
2026	Dream Ride Tour Australia 2025	Best Australian Live Act	Won	

=== GLAAD Media Awards ===
The GLAAD Media Award for Outstanding Music Artist is an annual award that honours music artists who are either openly queer or allies and have used their music to increase acceptance of the LGBT (lesbian, gay, bisexual, and transgender) community.

Year	Nominee / work	Award	Result	Ref.
2026	Themself	Dream Ride	Nominated	

=== J Awards ===
The J Awards are an annual series of Australian music awards that were established by the Australian Broadcasting Corporation's youth-focused radio station Triple J. They commenced in 2005.

Year	Nominee / work	Award	Result	Ref.
2018	Themself	Unearthed Artist of the Year	Nominated	
2023	Drummer	Australian Album of the Year	Won	
2023	G FLip	Australian Live Act of the Year	Nominated	

=== MTV Europe Music Awards ===
The MTV Europe Music Awards is an award presented by Viacom International Media Networks to honour artists and music in pop culture.

Year	Nominee / work	Award	Result	Ref.
2020	Themself	Best Australian Act	Won	

=== Music Victoria Awards ===
The Music Victoria Awards are an annual awards night celebrating Victorian music. They commenced in 2005.

Year	Nominee / work	Award	Result	Ref.
2019	Themself	Breakthrough Act of 2019	Won	
2021	G Flip	Best Musician	Nominated	
2021	G Flip	Best Solo Act	Nominated	
2024	Drummer	Best Album	Nominated	
2024	G Flip	Best Pop Work	Nominated	
2024	G Flip	Best Solo Artist	Nominated	

=== National Live Music Awards ===
The National Live Music Awards (NLMAs) commenced in 2016 to recognize contributions to the live music industry in Australia.

Year	Nominee / work	Award	Result	Ref.
2019	G Flip	Best New Act	Nominated	
2019	G Flip	Live Pop Act of the Year	Won	
2020	G Flip	Live Drummer of the Year	Won	
2023	G Flip	Best Live Drummer	Won	
2023	G Flip	Musicians Making a Difference	Nominated	

=== Rolling Stone Australia Awards ===
The Rolling Stone Australia Awards are awarded annually by the Australian edition of Rolling Stone magazine for outstanding contributions to popular culture in the previous year.

Year	Nominee / work	Award	Result	Ref.
2024	Drummer	Best Record	Nominated	
2025	G Flip	Rolling Stone Readers Award	Shortlisted	
