= Across the Great Divide Tour (video) =

Video by Powderfinger and Silverchair
- Released: 1 December 2007 (Australia)
- Recorded: 29 August – 26 October 2007
- Genres: Post-grunge, alternative rock
- Length: 84 minutes (disc 1); 88 minutes (disc 2); 90 minutes (disc 3)
- Producer: PVC Live

Powderfinger chronology
Sunsets (2004)	Across The Great Divide (2007)

Silverchair VHS/DVD chronology
Live from Faraway Stables (2003)	Across The Great Divide (2007)

Professional ratings
Review scores
Source	Rating
Darwin CitySearch	positive

The Across the Great Divide Tour was a live DVD and release by Australian rock bands Powderfinger and Silverchair. Released on 1 December 2007, it followed two Melbourne concerts during the bands' two-month-long nationwide tour, titled the Across the Great Divide tour. The DVD was produced by filming company PVC Live, who have produced DVD releases for U2, Red Hot Chili Peppers and Radiohead. It was mixed in the United States in 5.1 surround sound, and filmed with 24 cameras.

The DVD included a 90-minute documentary titled Behind the Great Divide, which followed the band members during the different concerts and events of the tour.

== Awards and accreditations ==
The DVD was ranked at number 13 on the ARIA's End-of-Year Charts for the Top 50 Music DVDs in 2007 and was also certified 2× platinum (over 30,000 units sold).

On 19 October 2008, the DVD won an award for Best Music DVD at the (22nd) Annual ARIA Music Awards put on by the Australian Recording Industry Association. They beat fellow nominees, Hilltop Hoods, Paul Kelly, John Butler, Wolfmother for the honour.

== Track listing ==
Disc one and two featured a gallery of photographs taken at the Melbourne performances.

=== Powderfinger show ===
1. "Head Up in the Clouds" (Dream Days at the Hotel Existence)
2. "Waiting for the Sun" (Odyssey Number Five)
3. "Lost and Running" (Dream Days at the Hotel Existence)
4. "Nobody Sees" (Dream Days at the Hotel Existence)
5. "Love Your Way" (Vulture Street)
6. "Thrilloilogy" (Odyssey Number Five)
7. "I Don't Remember" (Dream Days at the Hotel Existence)
8. "Already Gone" (Internationalist)
9. "Who Really Cares (Featuring the Sound of Insanity)" (Dream Days at the Hotel Existence)
10. "The Crux"
11. "Black Tears" (Dream Days at the Hotel Existence)
12. "These Days" (Odyssey Number Five)
13. "My Happiness" (Odyssey Number Five)
14. "Bless My Soul" (Fingerprints: The Best of Powderfinger, 1994–2000)
15. "Sunsets" (Vulture Street)
16. "(Baby I've Got You) On My Mind" (Vulture Street)
17. "Substitute" – a track which both bands covered and performed, the original is by The Who.

=== Silverchair show ===
1. "Young Modern Station" (Young Modern)
2. "Israel's Son" (Frogstomp)
3. "Emotion Sickness" (Neon Ballroom)
4. "Without You" (Diorama)
5. "Reflections of a Sound" (Young Modern)
6. "Insomnia" (Young Modern)
7. "Ana's Song (Open Fire)" (Neon Ballroom)
8. "Those Thieving Birds (Part 1)/Strange Behaviour/Those Thieving Birds (Part 2)" (Young Modern)
9. "The Greatest View" (Diorama)
10. "Luv Your Life" (Diorama)
11. "Straight Lines" (Young Modern)
12. "The Door" (Freak Show)
13. "Mind Reader" (Young Modern)
14. "If You Keep Losing Sleep" (Young Modern)
15. "Freak" (Freak Show)
16. "Substitute"

=== Documentary ===
The documentary was titled Behind the Great Divide. Segments included were:

- "Two Bands"
- "Hello Newcastle"
- "This Is Very Exciting Stuff"
- "You Might Need the Wide Lens"
- "Shambolic Jam"
- "A Four Nugget Experience"
- "Curse Your Stormy Weather"
- "Jake You Took Us the Long Way"
- "That's My Favourite Tambourine"
- "They Were So Much Better Than Shelbyville"
- "Bye Everyone, Thanks for Coming"
- "That Will Never Make the DVD"

== Personnel ==
=== Silverchair ===
- Daniel Johns – vocals, guitars
- Ben Gillies – drums, percussion
- Chris Joannou – bass guitar

==== Additional musicians ====
- Paul Mac – keyboards
- Adam Sofo – keyboards

=== Powderfinger ===
- Bernard Fanning – vocals, keyboards, guitars
- Darren Middleton – guitars, backing vocals
- Ian Haug – guitars, backing vocals
- John Collins – bass guitar
- Jon Coghill – drums, percussion

==== Additional musicians ====
- Lachlan Doley – keyboards

=== Behind the Great Divide ===
- Jade Skelly – producer and director
- James Hackett – executive producer

=== DVD production ===
- Cameron Barnett – director
- Peter Fowler – director
- Victoria Conners-Bell – producer

=== LIVE production ===
- Tim Jones – Video Systems
- Shane Budini – Video Systems
