= Who Really Cares (Featuring the Sound of Insanity) =

Single by Powderfinger

from the album Dream Days at the Hotel Existence
- Released: 31 March 2008 (Australia)
- Recorded: Sunset Sound, Los Angeles; January 2007–April 2007
- Genre: Alternative rock
- Length: Album version: 5:10; Radio edit: 3:31
- Label: Universal
- Songwriter(s): Jon Coghill, John Collins, Bernard Fanning, Ian Haug, Darren Middleton
- Producer(s): Rob Schnapf

Powderfinger singles chronology
"Nobody Sees" (2007)	"Who Really Cares (Featuring the Sound of Insanity)" (2008)	"All of the Dreamers" (2009)

"Who Really Cares (Featuring the Sound of Insanity)" is a song by Powderfinger from their sixth album Dream Days at the Hotel Existence. It is the fourth single and final single from the album and was released in Australia in March 2008. The band's publicist, Ms. Fanclub, announced on 27 February that the single would be released to radioplay in the following week, without specifying a date. In her announcement, she also noted that a music video will be released at about the same time. The music video was then released in mid-March; however, the single's release was then announced as 31 March.

A music video was released for the song; however, it features the live version of the song taken from the DVD for the Across the Great Divide tour, whereas the radio single for the song is a radio edit of the studio album version. The music video is directly taken from the DVD; however, it is altered optically with filters and converted into black and white.

== Background ==
"Who Really Cares (Featuring the Sound of Insanity)" was recorded by Powderfinger for their 2007 album Dream Days at the Hotel Existence at Sunset Sound Studio, Los Angeles, California, in early 2007 with producer Rob Schnapf. The part of the title "Featuring the Sound of Insanity" refers to a sound just after the bridge in which a sitar is played with synthesised effects overlaid. Prior to its release as a single, a live version of "Who Really Cares" appeared on the earlier Dream Days at the Hotel Existence single, "I Don't Remember". Another live version also appears on the group's 2007 DVD Across the Great Divide tour.

== Release ==
=== Cover art ===
Though the single was never a physical CD release, artwork was created for it. The artwork featured the headless man who is otherwise seen throughout the releases for other singles from Dream Days at the Hotel Existence, however on this cover, the area where his head would be is a fireball, and he appears to be holding a briefcase while walking down the hallway of a hotel, another common theme throughout the artwork for the album. Unlike the last two singles from Dream Days at the Hotel Existence, the artwork doesn't follow the picture-in-picture theme.

Powderfinger drummer Jon Coghill (right) and touring pianist Lachy Doley (left) in the music video for "Who Really Cares", featuring high contrast optical filters.

=== Music video ===
The music video for "Who Really Cares" is a live performance of the song by Powderfinger for their Across the Great Divide tour in 2007. The music video contains the performance featured on the DVD for the Across the Great Divide tour, filmed in Melbourne in 2007. The performance features a piano solo by the pianist Lachy Doley, who performed keyboards and piano throughout the tour. The music video, produced by PVC as part of the tour DVD, is completely in black and white and throughout features optical filters that warp and alter the visual display. These filters intensify from the bridge and continue until the end of the clip. The music is performed differently from the original studio recording, with improvised solos, including Ian Haug playing the sitar part on a double necked guitar with synthesised effects to emulate the sitar sound, and the performance of the song ends with a ritardando, where the tempo slows to an end.

== Critical response ==
"Who Really Cares (Featuring the Sound of Insanity)"
A 30 second sample from "Who Really Cares (Featuring the Sound of Insanity)", presenting the song's second chorus.

Prior to being released as a single, "Who Really Cares" received a mixed response by reviewers when commenting on Dream Days at the Hotel Existence. Melbourne based webzine TheScene.com.au reviewer Andrew Weaver comments on the song's musical layering, coupling the song with "Wishing on the Same Moon" and comments that the layering in the two songs gives the music "genuine depth of sound and taking the veteran group to new places". CitySearch Sydney also made reference to the likeness to "Wishing on the Same Moon", but notes that what sets the two songs apart is "a serviceable fade-out cacophony of keys and guitar". Music journalist Chris Leonard of UK magazine Rock Louder praises the live performance of the song while Powderfinger performed in Glasgow on 11 December 2007. J. Watson of Fasterlouder.com.au comments that the song, when performed live at The Sydney Opera House Forecourt for charity on 31 October 2007, was "another highlight of the evening". Fellow reviewer from Fasterlouder, ShahXerxes, comments on the song's "sparse Pink Floyd-esque sound which echoes through "Who Really Cares", as clever a rock ballad as the band have ever written." Andrew Ramadge of Mess + Noise echoed the comments of similarities to Pink Floyd, and also Neil Young, stating "where psych-gospel organ and wailing guitar billow around Fanning’s vocals like a lost track from Dark Side of the Moon". Though most of the critical response has been positive, the song has also received criticism from UK reviewer Matthias Scherer of Noize Makes Enemies. Scherer notes that the song's title "Who Really Cares" is a question that "should have been asked before recording, not during", though this comment refers both to the song itself, and the whole album of Dream Days at the Hotel Existence.

== Charts ==
The song's critical response has been mostly positive, though this was also true for the two prior singles from Dream Days at the Hotel Existence, which both performed poorly in the charts. Like these two, "Who Really Cares" was released to radioplay and music video stations, but with little inclusion in circulation, leading speculators to believe the single would follow "I Don't Remember" and "Nobody Sees" with poor charting performance. This speculation proved to be accurate, leading to "Who Really Cares" to be the first single by Powderfinger since their 2004 release "Bless My Soul" to fail to achieve a position on the ARIA Charts. Although B-side "One More Kiss As You Fly Away" was the number 81 on the ARIA Charts.

== Track listing ==
1. "Who Really Cares (Featuring the Sound of Insanity)"
2. "One More Kiss as You Fly Away"

== Personnel ==
=== Powderfinger ===
- Bernard Fanning – guitar and vocals
- John Collins – bass guitar
- Ian Haug – guitars
- Darren Middleton – guitars and backing vocals
- Jon Coghill – drums

=== Additional musicians ===
- Benmont Tench – piano (studio version)
- Lachy Doley - piano (live version)

=== Production ===
- Rob Schnapf – producer (studio version)
- Doug Boehm – engineer (studio version)
- Mark McElligott – engineer (live version)
- PVC – video production (live version)
