= Nobody Sees =

2007 single by Powderfinger

Single by Powderfinger

from the album Dream Days at the Hotel Existence
- Released: 1 December 2007
- Recorded: January 2007–April 2007
- Studio: Sunset Sound (Los Angeles)
- Genre: Alternative rock
- Length: 4:12
- Label: Universal
- Songwriters: Jon Coghill, John Collins, Bernard Fanning, Ian Haug, Darren Middleton
- Producer: Rob Schnapf

Powderfinger singles chronology
"I Don't Remember" (2007)	"Nobody Sees" (2007)	"Who Really Cares (Featuring the Sound of Insanity)" (2008)

Music video
- "Nobody Sees" by Powderfinger on YouTube

"Nobody Sees" is a song by Powderfinger from their sixth album Dream Days at the Hotel Existence. It is the third single from the album and was released in Australia on 1 December 2007. The announcement that it would be released as a single came at the same time as releasing the music video to the internet on the official Universal Records website.

Despite positive critical response, the song peaked at 51 on the ARIA Singles Chart.

== Background ==
"Nobody Sees" was recorded by Powderfinger for their 2007 album Dream Days at the Hotel Existence at Sunset Sound Studio, Los Angeles, California, in early 2007 with producer Rob Schnapf. In an interview with Jay and the Doctor on Triple J in November 2007, Fanning noted that the song is a "bookend" to Powderfinger's early breakout single "Pick You Up" from Double Allergic. He goes on to note that "It's 'who's going to pick you up now?'. Cause I'm not doing it any more." Fanning also noted that he considers the song a "spacey ballad". Though the band had previously released songs featuring piano, they had decided for this album to record with session pianist Benmont Tench, who previously had played for Tom Petty and the Heartbreakers, who were one of the inspirations of the album. This was in contrast to previous efforts where piano parts had been performed by Fanning or local Australian pianists. Despite Tench's performance on the song, Fanning appears in the music video as playing piano.

== Release ==
The single for "Nobody Sees" was officially released on 1 December 2007 in Australia. This was announced on 16 November 2007, only two weeks prior to its release. The single was released only to the iTunes Store as a three-song EP including the studio version of the song, a live version of the song and another song from Dream Days at the Hotel Existence.

=== Music video ===
The music video for "Nobody Sees" features the entire line-up of Powderfinger in shot in the dark at nighttime with the Melbourne cityscape in the background. The group's lead vocalist, Bernard Fanning, who in all previous recordings would play keyboards and piano parts, did not record any of these parts for Dream Days at the Hotel Existence, as these duties were fulfilled by Benmont Tench. Though Tench performed the keyboard in the recording of the song, Fanning appears at the keyboard in the music video. The scenes of the band playing are intercut with video shots of a do-it-yourself carwash, and five shots of people by themselves. These people are all initially shown being still then as the video progresses, the people are shown performing highly energetic actions in slow motion. The actions shown include running, falling and jumping. There are instances through Ian Haug's guitar solo where John Collins' bass guitar and Darren Middleton's electric guitar are also shown in close-up and slow motion.

=== Critical response ===
PerthNow reporter Jay Hanna called "Nobody Sees" "Powderfinger at their devastating best" in his Dream Days at the Hotel Existence review, commending its overall impact on the album. Clayton Bolger of Allmusic agreed, calling the song "wondrous" and praising Tench's piano work on it. The song was labeled an "AMG Track Pick". Herald Sun HiT reviewer Cameron Adams agreed, also commenting that the song was an excellent reminder "of Fanning’s prowess as a rock vocalist".

Mess + Noise reviewer Andrew Ramadge notes that "Nobody Sees" is validated by Dream Days at the Hotel Existence's controversial track "Black Tears", stating that it "would otherwise seem like the usual lovelorn crap [but] can’t help but take on a different meaning in the shadow of "Black Tears"." Shah Xerxes from Fasterlouder comments that the song is a "heartbreak-inspired and sugary love ballad", noting the songs sadness by referring to it as "an intensely moody number reserved for sadder moments where a little reflection and perspective is required."

UK reviewer Mike Rea from Contact Music noted "Nobody Sees" as a "standout song" from the album, which on the whole he rated 8/10. Sputnikmusic contributor James Bishop was less enthusiastic about the song, noting that it wasn't dissimilar to past Powderfinger works, although noting that it utilized "the variety and flexibility the band is capable of."

== Track listing ==
The track listing for the "Nobody Sees" single is listed with iTunes Store as being an EP, though includes only three songs, beginning with the studio version of the song. The second track is the live performance of the song taken from their Across the Great Divide tour performance at the Brisbane Powerhouse in October 2007, and the final track, "Wishing on the Same Moon", is also from the Powerhouse performance, and also originally from Dream Days at the Hotel Existence.

1. "Nobody Sees" – 4:12
2. "Nobody Sees" (live) – 4:38
3. "Wishing on the Same Moon" (live) – 5:53

== Personnel ==
Powderfinger

- Bernard Fanning – guitar and vocals
- John Collins – bass guitar
- Ian Haug – guitars
- Darren Middleton – guitars, backing vocals
- Jon Coghill – drums

Additional musicians

- Benmont Tench – piano and keyboards

Production

- Rob Schnapf – producer
- Doug Boehm – engineer

== Charts ==
Weekly chart performance for "Nobody Sees"
Chart (2007)	Peak position
Australia (ARIA)	51
