= I Don't Remember =

2007 single by Powderfinger

Single by Powderfinger

from the album Dream Days at the Hotel Existence
- Released: 4 August 2007
- Length: 3:41
- Label: Universal Music Australia
- Songwriters: Jon Coghill, John Collins, Bernard Fanning, Ian Haug, Darren Middleton
- Producer: Rob Schnapf

Powderfinger singles chronology
"Lost and Running" (2007)	"I Don't Remember" (2007)	"Nobody Sees" (2007)

"I Don't Remember" is a song by Australian alternative rock band Powderfinger, from the album Dream Days at the Hotel Existence. It made its radio debut on 9 July 2007 on Australian radio stations, and was subsequently released as a single and digital download on 4 August 2007 in Australia, 3 September 2007 in New Zealand, and 13 August 2007 in the United States. The song was written by Powderfinger lead singer Bernard Fanning, and influenced by bassist John Collins. The riff was then developed by guitarist Ian Haug. The song is about reconciling difficulties and arguments, rather than shifting the blame.

"I Don't Remember" was lauded by some reviewers, who appreciated its energy, while other reviewers were more critical, deeming it an advertisement-style song. The music video also received critical acclaim, especially for the parodies it contained. Despite the reviews, the single charted poorly, reaching number 42 on the ARIA Singles Chart.

== Background, writing, and recording ==
The song was written by the band's lead singer, Bernard Fanning, following a night he spent drinking with bassist John Collins towards the end of the recording phase of Dream Days at the Hotel Existence. The song was written by Fanning on guitar, but he later wrote the main riff on piano, which was then converted into a lead guitar riff performed by Ian Haug. The guitars for the song are all tuned down one step; while the guitar finger positioning is played as though in the key of C major, the detuning brings the key of the song down to Bb, with the song leading off with Bb's relative minor, G minor. During the recording phase, Fanning suggested "softening" the main riff by returning it to the piano, and even recorded this concept; however this piano version did not end up in the final album mix, nor was it included as a B-side on the single.

"I Don't Remember" was recorded in Los Angeles during pre-production for Dream Days at the Hotel Existence. It contains a simple acoustic riff, similar to several songs on previous albums including Vulture Street. While recording the song in January 2007, Fanning said in an interview that:

It's a song about making mistakes and trying to reconcile what they were — but then in the end, in the wash up — it doesn't really matter whose fault it was, as long as it gets reconciled.

This meaning was also evident in the song's lyrics. In the second line, Fanning states that "I made a mistake that I'll never surpass", before explaining that it does not matter whose fault it is, in saying "I know you needed someone to take the fall/I know you needed someone to blame it on". In the second verse, Fanning again reiterates that he feels pain in the mistake that was made, when he says "I found my heart and it broke like glass/I made that mistake that I'll never surpass".

John Collins said of the song:

I hope the song sounds exciting, without sounding ... big rock? Without sounding country, and sound interesting, 'cause I think that the basis of the song if you play it on the acoustic is there, and it's up to us [Powderfinger] to stuff it up now.

When Powderfinger first played the song to Benmont Tench, who would feature in a piano role throughout the album, he remarked that it reminded him of Buffalo Springfield, who was an inspiration of Tom Petty and the Heartbreakers. Fanning replied that "we were thinking more of the Heartbreakers", indicating the musical style intended in "I Don't Remember", but also paying homage to Tench, whom the band would work with extensively. Tench performed with the band on the album version of the song.

== Response ==
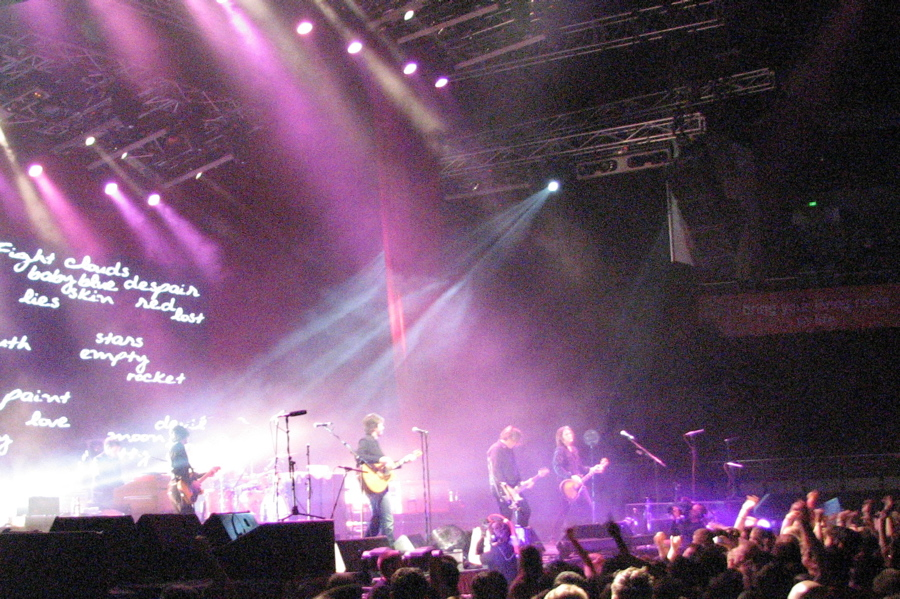
Powderfinger performing "I Don't Remember" on the Across the Great Divide tour.

In his review of Dream Days at the Hotel Existence, Herald Sun HiT journalist Cameron Adams claimed that "I Don't Remember" was more of an advertisement style song, similar to "Lost and Running", the first single released from the album. Adams stated that "'I Don't Remember' is not the next single without reason—it does everything you expect a Powderfinger single to, perhaps a more appropriate 'ad' for this album." Sputnikmusic contributor James Bishop described "I Don't Remember" as unoriginal, but at the same time said that it proved Powderfinger "haven't forgotten how to write a good song".

AllMusic reviewer Clayton Bolger, however, described it positively as a "stadium anthem" and stating that it was a good example of the "trademarks of classic Powderfinger" showcased on the album. The review labeled the song a "pick". Web Wombat's review of the album also treated the song positively, dubbing it "classic Powderfinger." Reviewer Andrew Tijs from CitySearch Brisbane stated that the song is "a smoothly emotive jangle-rock tune with a purposeful chorus and Fanning's inimitable vocal", though provides mixed reviews when compared with other songs by the group, noting that "It's no eerie ballad like 'The Day You Come', nor does it have 'Like a Dog''s snarl, nor 'On My Mind''s pub rock shudder."

"I Don't Remember" was performed regularly on the Across the Great Divide Tour, generally with positive responses. FasterLouder reviewer gumbuoy stated that "The new songs are excellent live; I Don't Remember has more energy than its recorded counterpart (Lost and Running)", following by praising the album and performance as a whole.

== Chart performance ==
"I Don't Remember" entered the Australian Singles Chart at number 43, then slid to number 47 in its second week, but then reached its pinnacle position of number 42 in its third week. It then remained in the charts for the following three weeks in the upper forties, and then dropped off the chart. It was released as a single in New Zealand and the United States also, but failed to chart, despite moderate airplay in New Zealand. "I Don't Remember" charted at number 66 on the Triple J Hottest 100 of 2007.

== Music video ==
Lead singer "Bernie" performing with fictional Powderfinger parody band Littlefinger at Little Day Out in the music video for "I Don't Remember".

The music video for "I Don't Remember" was made by Fifty Fifty Films, who had previously collaborated with the band on the videos for "Like a Dog", "(Baby I've Got You) On My Mind", and "Lost and Running", all nominated for ARIA Awards. It was filmed at Samford, just outside Brisbane, Queensland. The 'Little Day Out' concert was filmed at Samford State School.

The music video starts on a school bus with children playing and throwing things, and features a young boy who then selects the track "I Don't Remember" on his iPod and closes his eyes. He then dreams about a school concert for a band called "Littlefinger", a parody of the band for which he is the lead singer "Bernie", a parody of Bernard Fanning. The band and audience are composed of primary school students. Children are seen offering a chocolate milk called smilo, a take on Milo, and a camera crew for "Channel [Z]" and reporter "Su-Mi". This is a parody of Yumi Stynes, a presenter from Australian music station Channel V. The end of the clip shows that it was a dream being had by the student who played the lead singer for "Littlefinger".

Many elements of "I Don't Remember"'s video received positive critical response for the usage of children in it. Kathy McCabe of The Daily Telegraph summarised critical feelings towards the video, by suggesting in her review that "[maybe] bands should get kids to play them in videos forever".

== Track listings ==
"I Don't Remember"
A 20 second sample from "I Don't Remember", presenting the song's first chorus.

CD single

1. "I Don't Remember" – 3:41
2. "Who Really Cares (Featuring the Sound of Insanity)" (live at Brisbane Powerhouse)
3. "My Kind of Scene" (live at Brisbane Powerhouse)

iTunes digital download

1. "I Don't Remember" – 3:41
2. "Black Tears" (live) (early release exclusive)

== Personnel ==
Powderfinger

- Bernard Fanning – guitar and vocals
- John Collins – bass guitar
- Ian Haug – guitars
- Darren Middleton – guitars
- Jon Coghill – drums

Additional musicians

- Benmont Tench – piano and keyboards

Production

- Rob Schnapf – production
- Doug Boehm – engineering

== Charts ==
Weekly chart performance for "I Don't Remember"
Chart (2007)	Peak position
Australia (ARIA)	42

== Release history ==
Release dates and formats for "I Don't Remember"
Region	Release date
Australia	4 August 2007
United States	13 August 2007
New Zealand	3 September 2007
