= Black Tears =

Song by Powderfinger

from the album Dream Days at the Hotel Existence
- Released: 2 June 2007 (Dream Days at the Hotel Existence)
- Recorded: Sunset Sound, Los Angeles; January 2007–April 2007
- Genre: Folk
- Length: 2:30
- Label: Universal Music Australia
- Songwriters: Powderfinger (Jon Coghill, John Collins, Bernard Fanning, Ian Haug, Darren Middleton)
- Producer: Rob Schnapf

"Black Tears" is a song by Australian alternative rock band Powderfinger, from their sixth studio album Dream Days at the Hotel Existence. The song is an acoustic ballad in a folk music style, beginning with one guitar and a lead vocal, later introducing a guitar with a synthesised effect from the first chorus. Following the Dream Days at the Hotel Existence release, live versions of the song have been released on other recordings.

The song did not cause the release of the album to be delayed, despite claims that the song's lyrics could interfere with the 2004 Palm Island death in custody case.

== Controversy ==
On 2 May 2007, mX, an afternoon newspaper in Brisbane, revealed that the defence team for Senior Sergeant Chris Hurley would be referring the song to Queensland Attorney-General Kerry Shine, due to concerns that the song's lyrics could prejudice the 2004 Palm Island death in custody, where Hurley had been charged for manslaughter. On 2 May Hurley's lawyer Glen Cranny said "The content and proposed timing of the song’s release raises some serious concerns regarding Mr Hurley’s trial." It was claimed by the defence team that the song's lyrics were similar to the events that took place surrounding the death of Mulrunji. The band's manager, Paul Piticco, conceded the song was about the case but insisted they were not specific enough to cause a problem. The album was set to be released 10 days before Hurley would face Townsville Supreme Court, on 12 June. There were concerns that the case's jury could potentially be biased by the lyrical content.

Due to the concerns raised, Powderfinger sought legal advice. Then Queensland premier, Peter Beattie, who had legal experience, said the song was likely to be protected by free speech laws, noting "The matter would have to go pertain specifically to the issues of the trial" for a "prejudice" argument to be raised.

Several days after the initial threats of legal action, Powderfinger backed down and announced they would change the song. The band's lawyers sent Shine a copy of the new, altered lyrics. It was then reported that an analysis of the new lyrics found they were safe to release. This was the version that would later be used on the album. A statement from Shine's office stated that "Crown Law has examined the lyrics. Crown Law have advised Mr Shine's office the lyrics raise no legal concern."

In a June 2007 interview, Fanning noted that Powderfinger hoped to re-release the original version of the song in the future, after the case had been settled. He also said that he was not angry about having to change his lyrics, but lamented the lack of Australian musicians willing to challenge the status quo.

The legal threats against the song were attacked heavily by some writers, including Andrew Stafford of The Bulletin. He noted that it was highly unlikely "Black Tears" would be released as a single, so potential jurors would need to "buy a copy of Dream Days in the ten days between its release and Hurley's trial just to hear the song". He also noted that Piticco had stated the lyrics could just as easily refer to a death in Brisbane, not on Palm Island.

== Musical content ==
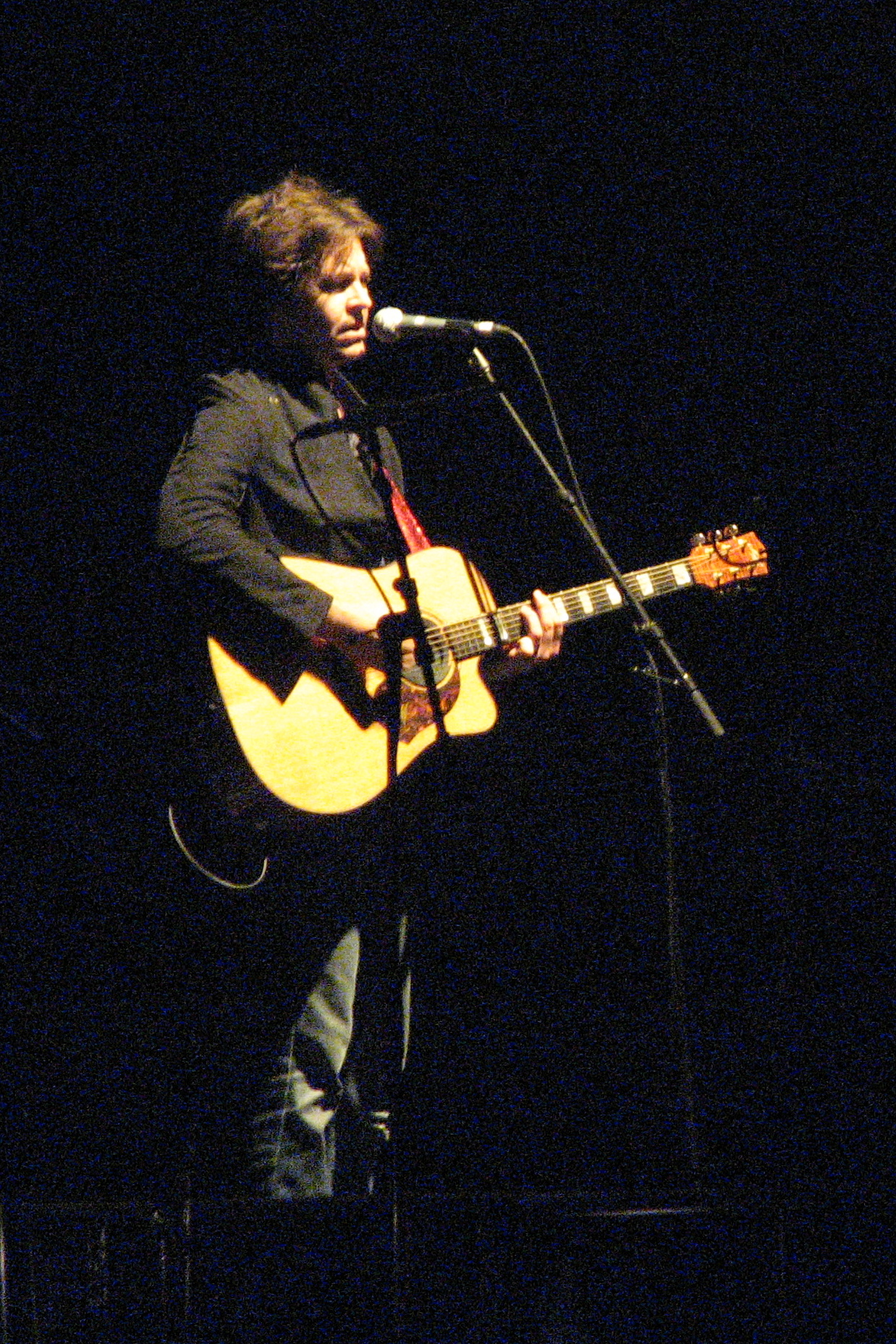
Bernard Fanning performing "Black Tears" on the Across the Great Divide tour

In a media statement published on the band's MySpace web page, lead singer Bernard Fanning, who originally wrote the song, said the inspiration came to him after "a trip that I took last year to Uluru". He said it discussed the issue of people climbing the rock, which is sacred in Aboriginal folklore, despite "the prevalence of literature and signage" asking people not to. Fanning compared climbing Uluru to climbing the Vatican, which he noted would be highly offensive to Catholics.

Fanning said the second part of the song, which contained the controversial lyrics, was written following the Queensland Director of Public Prosecutions passing down its finding in the death in custody case. He said that the band believed the song would have no bearing on the legal procedure, they would nonetheless include an alternative version of the song on Dream Days at the Hotel Existence.

The alternate version of the song still contains the lyrics An island watchhouse bed / A black man's lying dead. but not the lyrics that followed.

Upon announcing that the album would contain an altered version, Fanning noted his initial reasons for the song, stating "to bring attention to the obvious disadvantage that is still being suffered by Aboriginal people in this country", which he said included the issue of "Indigenous deaths in custody". Despite the claimed lyrical change, some early versions of Dream Days at the Hotel Existence were shipped with a version of "Black Tears" that included the controversial lyrics, which were also published on the band's website.

== Release history ==
=== Original version ===
- Dream Days at the Hotel Existence – Track 9

=== Live performances ===
- Across the Great Divide tour DVD – Disc 1, Track 11
- I Don't Remember – iTunes only – Track 2
