= Dream Days at the Hotel Existence =

Studio album by Powderfinger
- Released: 2 June 2007
- Recorded: January–April 2007
- Studios: Sunset Sound, Los Angeles
- Genre: Rock
- Length: 44:12
- Label: Universal Music
- Producer: Rob Schnapf

Powderfinger chronology
Fingerprints: The Best of Powderfinger, 1994-2000 (2004)	Dream Days at the Hotel Existence (2007)	Golden Rule (2009)

Singles from Dream Days at the Hotel Existence
- 1. "Lost and Running" Released: 12 May 2007; 2. "I Don't Remember" Released: August 2007; 3. "Nobody Sees" Released: 1 December 2007; 4. "Who Really Cares (Featuring the Sound of Insanity)" Released: 2008

Dream Days at the Hotel Existence is the sixth studio album by Australian rock band Powderfinger, released by Universal Music on 2 June 2007 in Australia, 19 November 2007 in the United Kingdom, and 11 November 2008 in the United States on the Dew Process label. It was released in Australia with a limited-edition bonus DVD, titled Powderfinger's First XI, featuring eleven music videos spanning the band's career, from the first single, "Tail" to "Bless My Soul", the band's latest single before the release of the album. A collector's edition, including a CD and DVD, was released on 18 April 2008.

Powderfinger reunited in late 2006, after a three-year hiatus, to write songs for Dream Days at the Hotel Existence, which was recorded in Los Angeles, California, in early 2007 by producer Rob Schnapf. The first single from the album, "Lost and Running" was released on 12 May 2007, and reached number five on the ARIA singles chart. Three further singles were released; "I Don't Remember", "Nobody Sees", and "Who Really Cares (Featuring the Sound of Insanity)", though they failed to equal "Lost and Running"'s chart performance.

The album received critical acclaim, with many reviewers commenting that the album was "consistent" and "distinctly Australian". The album encountered controversy relating to the song "Black Tears" with claims that it may have influenced the Palm Island death in custody trial. Powderfinger released an abridged version of the song as a result of these accusations.

== Background ==
Bernard Fanning stated in television interviews in 2006 that Powderfinger was working on a new album to be released the following year. On Powderfinger's website, guitarist Ian Haug said the upcoming album was an "exciting new direction" for the band's music. After a month of recording, on 2 March 2007, Fanning made an announcement on Australian radio station Triple J that tracking was complete, mixing the album was to follow, and the approximate release date was June. Fanning also stated that several of the tracks on the album feature session pianist Benmont Tench.

The title of the album was drawn from the book Brooklyn Follies by Paul Auster, which Fanning had read during the recording. He stated the concept of the title related to escapism, and that he felt it an appropriate sentiment to attach to the music of the album.

== Recording and production ==
Following their hiatus, which commenced after the release of Fingerprints: The Best of Powderfinger, 1994-2000, the band reconvened in late 2006 to write songs for Dream Days at the Hotel Existence. The band sought a new sound on the album, causing the recording process to be different from prior albums; Melbourne's Sing Sing studios were not used and Nick DiDia was no longer the producer.

Dream Days at the Hotel Existence was recorded at Sunset Sound Studio, Los Angeles, California, in early 2007 by producer Rob Schnapf, best known for his work with Beck and The Vines. Powderfinger had already written most of the album before departing to the United States. In particular, Powderfinger wrote songs in parts and brought them together; some songs were written in pairs or trios, while others were written in parts by different people, and then combined. According to the band, this brought a "diverse" and "fresh" approach to songwriting. The band used different methods in putting the album together as "it comes back to the sound the five of us can make together". Powderfinger guitarist Darren Middleton commented that as a rule they preferred not to put together an album that was just "plain". As the style of writing differed, the band identified the need for piano performances in many of their songs, enlisting veteran pianist Benmont Tench to play parts throughout.

== Artwork ==
Dream Days at the Hotel Existence's cover art was designed by Aaron Hayward & David Homer of Debaser, a New South Wales-based design organisation. The recipient of the 2007 ARIA Award for "Best Cover Art", the album art features a photograph of a road leading into the Australian outback horizon. In the centre, placed in the sky in relation to the background, there is a window with a crimson curtain. Within this window is a hotel room, as per the name of the album, in which a man with no head in a suit is seated at the end of the bed while watching the television.

The typeface used on the album's cover art.

Above the window is the album title and at the top of the cover is the band's name in a typeface more crafty than on previous album covers. Though the general design of the cover is that of a 1930s hotel in style, the typeface juxtaposes the general design with being a rather futuristic, science-fiction styled typeset. This is the second futuristic style that the band has used for their name, the first appearing on Vulture Street.

== Album and single releases ==
"Lost and Running"
A twenty second sample from "Lost and Running"

"I Don't Remember"
A 20 second sample from "I Don't Remember"

The album was released in Australia on 2 June 2007, and in the United Kingdom on 19 November of the same year. A "limited edition" version of the album included a DVD featuring a collection of Powderfinger music videos, titled Powderfinger's First XI. The music video for "Lost and Running" was also included, and was dubbed The Twelfth Man. A collector's edition, including a CD and DVD, was released on 18 April 2008.

Several songs from the album were launched to Perth fans as free music downloads via PerthNow, a Perth-based newspaper. Fans were required to obtain a codeword from the newspaper, then submit it online to download the tracks.

The first single from Dream Days at the Hotel Existence was "Lost and Running" and the video clip, which was directed by Damon Escott and Stephen Lance of Head Pictures, began showing in Australia on 21 April 2007. The single made its Australian radio debut on 16 April 2007, but had been available for several days beforehand on the Powderfinger's MySpace web page. An exclusive early release of the song was played by Triple J on 13 April 2007. "Lost and Running" reached number five on the ARIA singles chart.

The second single from the album was "I Don't Remember". The film clip for the song was created by Fifty Fifty Films, who have created music videos for the group before including "Passenger" and "Like a Dog". The song was aired on radio on 9 July 2007, the music video was released in July, and the CD single was released for sales on 4 August 2007. The video was shot at Samford State School in Powderfinger's home city of Brisbane and features many of the school's students.

On 16 November 2007, it was announced that the third single from Dream Days at the Hotel Existence would be the album's sixth track, "Nobody Sees". A video was released on the same day as the announcement and the single is set to be released as a digital single on 1 December 2007. In February 2008, Powderfinger announced the release of the album's fourth single, "Who Really Cares (Featuring the Sound of Insanity)".

== Critical reception ==
Professional ratings
Review scores
Source	Rating
AllMusic	3.5/5 stars
Brisbane Times	mixed
Herald Sun	mixed
Rolling Stone	3/5 stars
The Sunday Times (WA)	4/5 stars
The Sydney Morning Herald	mixed

Sydney Morning Herald commentator Bernard Zuel described Dream Days at the Hotel Existence as Powderfinger's first dull album, noting that on numerous songs "It promises to become exciting but never quite gets there." He complained that most of the songs were uneventful, or uninspiring, and that they do not "lift you as a listener." PerthNow's Jay Hanna disagreed, claiming the album was "rippling with emotions". He said the album contained some "incredible moments", praising "Head Up in the Clouds", and calling "Nobody Sees" "Powderfinger at their devastating best", while giving the album four stars.

Cameron Adams of Herald Sun HiT stated that the album contained no new directions for the band, and was highly consistent. He noted that the album contained less "rough edges and attitude" than predecessor Vulture Street, and likening the album more to Odyssey Number Five. Sputnikmusic's James Bishop agreed, claiming the band should be concerned by the "lack of experimentation or ambition" on the album. He again stated that the album was consistent, noting that "there actually isn't a bad song present". The review, which gave the album three and a half stars, commented that it seemed the band were trying to move towards the bluegrass genre, and "edging their way into the adult-contemporary section" of a music store, something they had not shown on their previous works.

AllMusic's Clayton Bolger drew comparisons to Internationalist in his review, which gave the album three and a half stars. He said the album contained "all the trademarks of classic Powderfinger", praising Fanning's vocals, Middleton and Haug's "twin-guitar attack", Collins' basslines and Coghill's "powerhouse drum work". While praising "I Don't Remember" as an excellent anthem, and "Surviving" for containing "a sonic blast of rock", he was critical of "Lost and Running", which he said felt "tired and sluggish", while "Ballad of a Dead Man" was described as "tedious".

== Track listing ==
All songs were written and performed by Powderfinger with performances by pianist Benmont Tench.

1. "Head Up in the Clouds" – 3:47
2. "I Don't Remember" – 3:41
3. "Lost and Running" – 3:42
4. "Wishing on the Same Moon" – 4:32
5. "Who Really Cares (Featuring the Sound of Insanity)" – 5:10
6. "Nobody Sees" – 4:14
7. "Surviving" – 3:45
8. "Long Way to Go" – 3:46
9. "Black Tears" – 2:30
10. "Ballad of a Dead Man" – 5:29
11. "Drifting Further Away" – 3:40

Bonus tracks

- "Down by the Dam" – 4:29^{[A]}
- "Glory Box" – 4:32^{[B]}

=== Limited edition bonus DVD ===
Released under the titles Powderfinger's First XI and The Twelfth Man, the bonus DVD features eleven music videos by Powderfinger spanning their entire recording career, and also includes the launch single to Dream Days at the Hotel Existence, "Lost and Running".

Powderfinger's First XI

1. "Tail" – 4:24
2. "Living Type" – 3:25
3. "Pick You Up" – 3:30
4. "Passenger" – 4:39
5. "Good Day Ray"^{[C]} – 1:50
6. "Don't Wanna Be Left Out" – 2:18
7. "My Kind of Scene" – 4:31
8. "Like a Dog" – 4:41
9. "On My Mind"^{[D]} – 3:40
10. "Sunsets" (Acoustic version) – 3:57
11. "Bless My Soul" – 4:06
- The Twelfth Man: "Lost and Running" – 3:52

Notes:

A. "Down by the Dam" was included as a bonus track on the version of the album released on the iTunes Store, and was included on the CD of the single "Lost and Running".
B. "Glory Box" was included as a bonus track on the UK version of the album. The song is a Portishead cover and is taken from the No Man's Woman album.
C. Generally listed as "Good-Day Ray", however it is listed without a hyphen on the CD insert and DVD.
C. The video and single for the song "(Baby I've Got You) On My Mind" were released simply as "On My Mind" without the bracketed title, and the song is listed as such on the DVD.

== Commercial performance ==
The album debuted in the ARIA Album Charts on 11 June 2007 at number one, becoming Powderfinger's fourth album to peak at the top spot. The album was certified platinum in its first week of sales, and its double platinum certification was announced later. A week after its release, the album achieved the highest first-week sales figures of any new release in 2007, with total sales of 40,847, thus making it the fastest selling album of the year in Australia. In its first week of release, Dream Days at the Hotel Existence broke the Australian digital album sales record, with over 3,000 digital sales.

== Charts ==
=== Weekly charts ===
Chart (2007–08)	Peak position
Australian Albums (ARIA)	1
New Zealand Albums (RMNZ)	22

=== Year-end charts ===
Chart (2007)	Position
Australia (ARIA) Albums	6
Australian Artist Albums Chart	2
Chart (2008)	Position
Australian Artist Albums Chart	46

== Certifications ==
Region	Certification	Certified units/sales
Australia (ARIA)	3× Platinum	210,000^{^}
^{^} Shipments figures based on certification alone.

== "Black Tears" controversy ==
On 2 May 2007, "Black Tears", the ninth song on Dream Days at the Hotel Existence, sparked controversy after claims that its lyrics could invoke prejudice in the Palm Island death in custody trial. Lawyers for the accused, Senior Sergeant Chris Hurley, lodged a complaint to the Queensland Attorney-General relating to the lyrics of the song. According to Hurley's legal team, the initial lyrics dealt with the "death of a Palm Island man, Mulrunji Doomadgee", in stating "an island watch-house bed, a black man's lying dead". Bernard Fanning made a media statement in response to the complaint, stating that the band had never intended for the song to contain "even the slightest suggestion of any prejudice". He also said the band would still release the album on the planned date, but with an alternate version of "Black Tears". Fanning later said he was not angry about having to change his lyrics, but he lamented the lack of Australian musicians willing to challenge the status quo.

== Touring ==
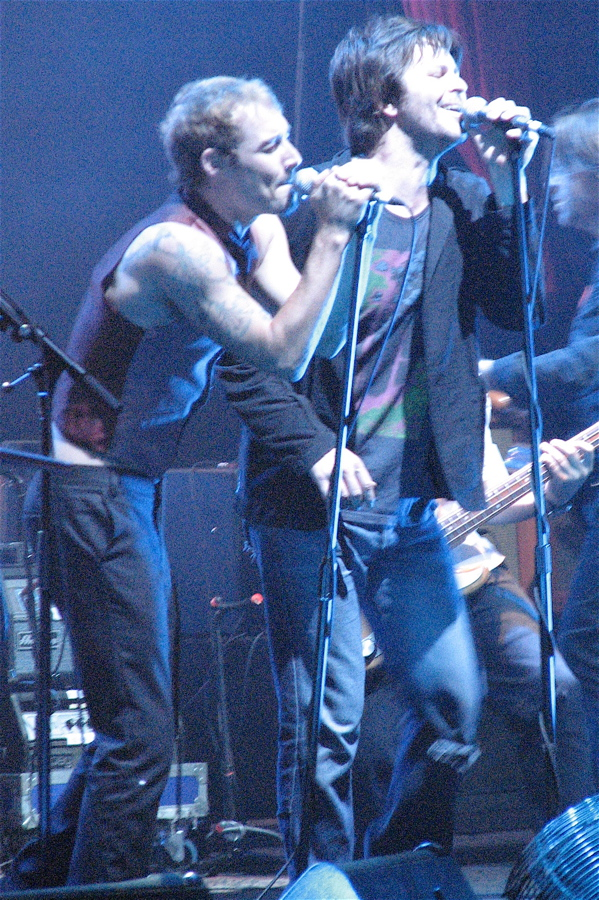
Daniel Johns and Bernard Fanning performing on the Across the Great Divide tour in Sydney.

Tickets for a nationwide tour of launch shows for Dream Days at the Hotel Existence went on sale on 10 May 2007 on the band's website, with tickets to the general public being released a day later. Powderfinger also toured in New South Wales and northern Victoria. Australian pianist Lachlan Doley was enlisted to play piano and keyboard parts on their live performances in these shows. His performances were welcomed by critics and audiences, with AdelaideNow commenting that "local ring-in Lachlan Doley added shimmering keys to the band's richly textured sound". Powderfinger and Doley performed the single "Lost and Running" on popular Australian variety show Rove on 17 June 2007. The group performed at Splendour in the Grass on 4 August 2007, and then followed it up by performing at Triple J's AWOL Concert in Karratha, Western Australia on 18 August 2007.

Powderfinger announced the Across the Great Divide tour on 12 June 2007. The band were accompanied on the nationwide concert tour by Australian rock group Silverchair. The tour is featured not only in the capital cities, but in fourteen Australian and New Zealand regional centres as well. According to Fanning, "the idea is to show both bands are behind the idea of reconciliation [of Indigenous Australians]."

== Personnel ==
=== Powderfinger ===
- Bernard Fanning – guitar and vocals
- John Collins – bass guitar
- Ian Haug – guitars
- Darren Middleton – guitars and backing vocals
- Jon Coghill – drums
- Cody Anderson – backup drummer

=== Additional musicians ===
- Benmont Tench – piano and keyboards

=== Production ===
- Rob Schnapf – producer
- Doug Boehm – engineer

== See also ==
- Powderfinger albums
- Full discography
