= APRA Music Awards of 2008 =

Annual Australian music awards

- Date: 16 June 2008
- Location: Sydney Hilton; Sydney, Australia

The Australasian Performing Right Association Awards of 2008 (generally known as APRA Awards) are a series of awards which include the APRA Music Awards, Classical Music Awards, and Screen Music Awards. The APRA Music Awards ceremony occurred on 16 June at the Sydney Hilton, they were presented by APRA and the Australasian Mechanical Copyright Owners Society (AMCOS). The Classical Music Awards were distributed in July in Sydney and are sponsored by APRA and the Australian Music Centre (AMC). The Screen Music Awards were issued in November by APRA and Australian Guild of Screen Composers (AGSC).

== Awards ==
Nominees and winners with results indicated on the right.

=== APRA Music Awards ===
Song of the Year
Title	Artist	Writer	Result
"1234"	Feist	Sally Seltmann, Leslie Feist	Nominated
"20 Good Reasons"	Thirsty Merc	Rai Thistlethwayte	Nominated
"Better Than"	The John Butler Trio	John Butler	Nominated
"Lost and Running"	Powderfinger	Jonathon Coghill, John Collins, Bernard Fanning, Ian Haug, Darren Middleton	Nominated
"Straight Lines"	Silverchair	Daniel Johns, Julian Hamilton	Won
Songwriters of the Year
Writer			Result
Daniel Johns			Won
Breakthrough Songwriter Award
Writer			Result
Sally Seltmann			Won
Ted Albert Award for Outstanding Services to Australian Music
Name			Result
Roger Davies			Won
Most Played Australian Work
Title	Artist	Writer	Result
"20 Good Reasons"	Thirsty Merc	Rai Thistlethwayte	Nominated
"Light Surrounding You"	Evermore	Dann Hume, Jon Hume	Nominated
"Lost and Running"	Powderfinger	Jonathon Coghill, John Collins, Bernard Fanning, Ian Haug, Darren Middleton	Nominated
"New York"	Eskimo Joe	Stuart MacLeod, Joel Quartermain, Kav Temperley	Nominated
"Straight Lines"	Silverchair	Daniel Johns, Julian Hamilton	Won
Most Played Australian Work Overseas
Title	Artist	Writer	Result
"Woman"	Wolfmother	Andrew Stockdale, Chris Ross, Myles Heskett	Won
Blues & Roots Work of the Year
Title	Artist	Writer	Result
"Funky Tonight"	The John Butler Trio	John Butler	Nominated
"Good Excuse"	The John Butler Trio	John Butler	Won
"I Thought About You"	The Beautiful Girls	Matthew McHugh	Nominated
"I've Been Loving You Too Long"	The Hiptones	Narmon Tulsi, Paul Wimbles, Stephen Smith	Nominated
"La"	Old Man River	Ohad Rein	Nominated
Country Work of the Year
Title	Artist	Writer	Result
"Everything's Going to be Alright"	Troy Cassar-Daley	Troy Cassar-Daley, Don Walker	Won
"Higher Than Heaven"	James Blundell	James Blundell, Lyndsay Hammond	Nominated
"Rockin' the Rig"	Travis Sinclair	Colin Buchanan, Garth Porter	Nominated
"Run Away"	Carter and Carter	Merelyn Carter, David Carter	Nominated
"Spirit of the Bush"	Lee Kernaghan featuring Adam Brand and Steve Forde	Lee Kernaghan, Colin Buchanan, Garth Porter	Nominated
Dance Work of the Year
Title	Artist	Writer	Result
"Don't You Wanna Feel"	Rogue Traders	Jamie Appleby, Natalie Bassingthwaighte, Steven Davis, Dougal Drummond	Nominated
"In Love Again"	Rogue Traders	Jamie Appleby, Melinda Appleby, Roland Orzabal, Curt Smith	Won
"The Others"	TV Rock vs the Dukes of Windsor	Cory Blight, Scott Target, Jack Weaving	Nominated
"Pictures"	Sneaky Sound System	Angus McDonald, Connie Mitchell	Nominated
"UFO"	Sneaky Sound System	Angus McDonald, Connie Mitchell	Nominated
Jazz Work of the Year
Title	Artist	Writer	Result
"Away"	Stephen Magnusson	Stephen Magnusson	Nominated
"Ceremony"	Matt McMahon Trio	Matt McMahon	Nominated
"Eucalypso"	The Moovin' and Groovin' Orchestra	Kenneth Schroder	Won
"More Spare Time"	Colin Hopkins	Colin Hopkins	Nominated
"Postcard from Footscray"	Way Out West	Peter Knight	Nominated
Urban Work of the Year
Title	Artist	Writer	Result
"All Night Long"	Joel Turner	Joel Turner, Stanley Campbell, Chris Heiner, Israel Cruz	Nominated
"City of Dreams"	Joel Turner featuring C4 & KNO	Joel Turner, Shaunn Diamond, Chris Heiner, Kitchener Wesche	Nominated
"Dr Love"	The Bumblebeez	Christopher Colonna, Pia Colonna	Nominated
"In the Basement"	Jade MacRae	Jade MacRae, Arnthor Birgisson	Won
"What a Great Night"	Hilltop Hoods	Barry Francis, Matthew Lambert, Daniel Smith	Nominated
=== Classical Music Awards ===
Best Composition by an Australian Composer
Title		Composer	Result
So We Begin Afresh		Damien Ricketson	Nominated
Micrographia		Michael Smetanin	Nominated
Piano Sonata No.3		Carl Vine	Nominated
The Last Whale		Colin Bright	Won
The Love of the Nightingale		Richard Mills	Nominated
Best Performance of an Australian Composition
Title	Composer	Performer	Result
Rare Sugar	Nigel Westlake	The Australia Ensemble, Catherine McCorkill (clarinetist)	Won
Sonatina for Solo Violin	Andrew Schultz	Jennifer Pike	Nominated
Piano Sonata No. 3	Carl Vine	Elizabeth Schumann	Nominated
O Antiphons	Raffæle Marcellino	The Song Company	Nominated
The Lost Art of Letter Writing	Brett Dean	Frank Peter Zimmermann (violinist), Munich Philharmonic, Jonathan Nott (conductor)	Nominated
Instrumental Work of the Year
Title	Composer	Performer	Result
More Marimba Dances	Ross Edwards	Claire Edwardes	Nominated
Walk a Golden Mile	Mark Isaacs	Mark Isaacs (piano), James Muller (electric & acoustic guitars), Jay Anderson (acoustic bass), Vinni Colaiuta (drums), Bob Sheppard (soprano, alto & tenor saxophones)	Won
Waltz for Melanie	Mark Isaacs	Mark Isaacs (piano), James Muller (electric & acoustic guitars), Jay Anderson (acoustic bass), Vinni Colaiuta (drums), Bob Sheppard (soprano, alto & tenor saxophones)	Nominated
Long-Term Contribution to the Advancement of Australian Music
Artist or Organisation			Result
Gwen Bennett			Nominated
Richard Letts			Won
Sally Mays			Nominated
Sonic Art Ensemble (The Seymour Group)			Nominated
The Song Company			Nominated
Orchestral Work of the Year
Title	Composer	Performer	Result
90 Minutes Circling the Earth	Stuart Greenbaum	Melbourne Symphony Orchestra, Brett Kelly (conductor)	Won
Cantilena Pacifica	Richard Meale	Tasmanian Symphony Orchestra, Erica Kennedy (violin), Richard Mills (conductor)	Nominated
Glass Soldier Suite	Nigel Westlake	Melbourne Symphony Orchestra, Geoffrey Payne (cornet), Jean-Louis Forestier (conductor)	Nominated
Musaic	Anne Cawrse	Melbourne Symphony Orchestra, Kevin Field (conductor)	Nominated
Oboe Concertante	Margaret Sutherland	Melbourne Symphony Orchestra, Jiří Tancibudek (oboe), Patrick Thomas (conductor)	Nominated
Trumpet Concerto	James Ledger	West Australian Symphony Orchestra, David Elton (trumpet), Sachio Fujioka (conductor)	Nominated
Outstanding Contribution by an Individual
Individual		Work	Result
Andrew Ford		composer, writer, educator and broadcaster in Australia and overseas	Nominated
Ian Munro		contribution to Australian performance and composition in 2007	Won
Outstanding Contribution by an Organisation
Organisation		Work	Result
Halcyon, Synergy Percussion and Ensemble Offspring		collaboration in Tehillim	Nominated
International Association of Music Libraries (IAML)		concerts presented at the 2007 international conference (Sydney)	Nominated
Canberra International Chamber Music Festival, Nicole Canham, Pro Musica Inc		2007 Canberra International Chamber Music Festival	Nominated
Tura New Music		2007 festival, touring program, its advocacy and support in Western Australia	Won
West Australian Symphony Orchestra		Concerto Project	Nominated
Outstanding Contribution to Australian Music in Education
Organisation		Work	Result
The Griffyn Ensemble's Mentoring Program		2007 activities	Nominated
Melbourne Symphony Orchestra's ArtPlay ensemble		touring program and music theatre project Hunger	Won
Sydney Symphony Education Program		2007 Sinfonietta Project	Nominated
The Song Company		MODART professional development project	Nominated
Outstanding Contribution to Australian Music in a Regional Area
Organisation		Work	Result
Australian Voices		2007 Australian Voices Festival (Kenilworth, Queensland)	Won
Peter Lynch, Murray Conservatorium (Albury Wodonga)		inspired commitment to Australian Music	Nominated
Vocal or Choral Work of the Year
Title	Composer	Performer	Result
"Carol of the Font" from Soul Architecture Cycle	Becky Llewellyn	Syntony	Nominated
Symphony No. 4 "Star Chant"	Ross Edwards, Fred Watson	Adelaide Symphony Orchestra, Richard Mills (conductor); Adelaide Chamber Singers, Carl Crossin (director); Adelaide Philharmonia Chorus, Timothy Sexton (director)	Won
=== Screen Music Awards ===
Best Feature Film Score
Title		Composer	Result
Children of the Silk Road		David Hirschfelder	Won
Rogue		Francois Tetaz	Nominated
The Assassination of Jesse James by the Coward Robert Ford		Nick Cave, Warren Ellis	Nominated
Unfinished Sky		Antony Partos	Nominated
Best Music for an Advertisement
Title		Composer	Result
Australian Rugby Union – "Men of Gold"		Mark Rivett, Haydn Walker	Nominated
Herringbone – "Hands"		Elliott Wheeler	Won
LMFF – "Loreal Melbourne Fashion Festival" (2008)		Robert Burke, Benjamin Grayson	Nominated
SBS Station ID – "Six Billion Stories & Counting"		Roger Mason, Bryony Marks	Nominated
Best Music for Children's Television
Title		Composer	Result
Animalia – "Butterfly Winter"		Christopher Elves	Won
Dogstar - "Episode 24"		Yuri Worontschak	Nominated
Gumnutz: A Juicy Tale		Clive Harrison	Nominated
Pirate Islands the Lost Treasure of Fiji		Art Phillips	Nominated
Best Music for a Documentary
Title		Composer	Result
Halal Mate – "Episode 1 – Afifas Match"		Michael Den Elzen	Nominated
Last Trimate		Caitlin Yeo	Nominated
Night		Cezary Skubiszewski	Won
Secrets of the Forbidden City		Brett Aplin	Nominated
Best Music for a Mini-Series or Telemovie
Title		Composer	Result
East West 101 - "Episode 1"		Guy Gross	Nominated
Emerald Falls		Richard Pleasance	Won
Indonesia a Reporter's Journey – "Episode 1A difficult engagement"		Scott Saunders	Nominated
Best Music for a Short Film
Title		Composer	Result
Noir Drive		Geoffrey Russell	Won
Shot Open		Rachel Gaudry	Nominated
The Funk		Paul Gillett	Nominated
The Ground Beneath		Jonathan Nix, Miles Nicholas	Nominated
Best Music for a Television Series or Serial
Series or Serial	Episode title	Composer	Result
City Homicide	"Episode 14"	Richard Pleasance	Nominated
Summer Heights High	"Episode 8"	Jason Catherine, Chris Lilley, Bryony Marks	Nominated
Underbelly	"Episode 5"	Burkhard Dallwitz	Won
Who Do You Think You Are?	"Episode 2"	Ash Gibson Greig	Nominated
Best Original Song Composed for the Screen
Song title	Work	Composer	Result
"Free Falling 2"	Night	Cezary Skubiszewski, Jan Skubiszewski, Andy Baldwin, Clairanne Brown, Jules Pascoe	Nominated
"It's a Jungle Out There"	Underbelly	Burkhard Dallwitz	Nominated
"The Greatest Act in History"	The Black Balloon	Michael Yezerski	Nominated
"When We Get There"	The Black Balloon	Josh Pyke, Michael Yezerski	Won
Best Soundtrack Album
Title		Composer	Result
East of Everything		Greg J. Walker	Nominated
Rogue		Francois Tetaz	Nominated
The Assassination of Jesse James by the Coward Robert Ford		Nick Cave, Warren Ellis	Nominated
The Black Balloon		Michael Yezerski	Won
Best Television Theme
Title		Composer	Result
Elders		David Chapman	Nominated
Summer Heights High		Chris Lilley	Nominated
The Gruen Transfer		David Chapman	Nominated
Underbelly		Burkhard Dallwitz	Won
International Achievement Award
Artist			Result
Garry McDonald, Laurie Stone			Won
Most Performed Screen Composer - Australia
Composer			Result
Les Gock			Nominated
Jay Stewart			Won
Neil Sutherland			Nominated
Dinesh Wickremeratne			Nominated
Most Performed Screen Composer - Overseas
Composer			Result
Alastair Ford			Nominated
Guy Gross			Nominated
Chris Pettifer			Nominated
Neil Sutherland			Won

== See also ==
- Music of Australia
