= Active Kidz =

Children's exercise TV show

Active Kidz is a series of exercise television programs to encourage children to be more physically active, which was broadcast on the ABC at 4.30 pm weekdays in Australia, it was presented by Scott Ehler and Amy Wilkins. The show was very popular with children throughout Australia and won several awards including Best Music for Children's Television. Scott and Amy provide children with information about staying fit and healthy and present a dance routine which is taught to the audience in each show. The show was picked up on the Disney Channel in Asia where the team had sold-out tours throughout Asia.

The Active Kidz team toured the UK and the US in 2007 and 2008.

A second series was released onto the Nickelodeon and Nick Jr. channels on Australian pay television provider Foxtel in January 2008/2009. In 2008, following Amy Wilkins moving to a more managerial role due to pregnancy, Dimity Clancey joined the Active Kidz team, featuring in the second television series. Dimi is a journalist, and has toured all over the world with Barney, Hello Kitty and Meow Meow Kapow!

Scott was also Fitness Professional of NSW and Fitness Professional of Australia.

Active Kidz have an extensive range of DVDs, CDs, board games, clothing and other merchandise.

In 2006 Scott (28) and Amy (26) were named on the 30 under 30 List. Money Magazine reported that the 2 were making $15 million each a year through touring and royalties.

== Characters ==
- Scott Ehler – Host/Celebrity Photographer
- Amy Wilkins – Host on TV shows
- Dimity Clancey – Host
- Oprah: Scott and Amy's new dog
- Dr Julie on Season 2 shows
- The dog: AK 9 used in approximately 1–2 episodes

== Awards and nominations ==
=== APRA-AGSC Awards ===
The annual Screen Music Awards are presented by Australasian Performing Right Association (APRA) and Australian Guild of Screen Composers (AGSC) for television and film scores and soundtracks.

Year	Nominee / work	Award	Result
2004	Active Kidz – Scott Ehler, Glenn Heaton, Geoffrey McGarvey, Amy Wilkins	Best Music for Children's Television	Won
