= APRA Music Awards of 2004 =

Annual Australian music awards

- Date: 24 May 2004
- Location: Regent Theatre; Melbourne, Australia

The Australasian Performing Right Association Awards of 2004 (generally known as APRA Awards) are a series of awards which include the APRA Music Awards, Classical Music Awards, and Screen Music Awards. The APRA Music Awards ceremony occurred on 24 May at Melbourne's Regent Theatre, they were presented by APRA and the Australasian Mechanical Copyright Owners Society (AMCOS). The Classical Music Awards were distributed in July in Sydney and are sponsored by APRA and the Australian Music Centre (AMC). The Screen Music Awards were issued in November by APRA and Australian Guild of Screen Composers (AGSC).

== Awards ==
Nominees and winners with results indicated on the right.

=== APRA Music Awards ===
Song of the Year
Title	Artist	Writer	Result
"Across the Night"	Silverchair	Daniel Johns	Nominated
"Are You Gonna Be My Girl"	Jet	Nicholas Cester, Cameron Muncey	Nominated
"Innocent Eyes"	Delta Goodrem	Delta Goodrem, Vince Pizzinga	Nominated
"Lighthouse"	The Waifs	Joshua Cunningham	Nominated
"Zebra"	John Butler Trio	John Butler	Won
Songwriters of the Year
Writer			Result
Powderfinger – Bernard Fanning, Jon Coghill, Ian Haug, Darren Middleton, John Collins			Won
APRA Breakthrough Award
Writer			Result
Delta Goodrem			Won
Ted Albert Award for Outstanding Services to Australian Music
Name			Result
Don Burrows			Won
Most Performed Australian Work
Title	Artist	Writer	Result
"Born to Try"	Delta Goodrem	Delta Goodrem, Audius Mtawarira	Nominated
"Innocent Eyes"	Delta Goodrem	Delta Goodrem, Vince Pizzinga	Nominated
"Falling"	Candice Alley	Candice Giannarelli	Nominated
"Lovesong"	Amiel	Amiel Daemion	Won
"On My Mind"	Powderfinger	Bernard Fanning, Darren Middleton, John Collins, Ian Haug, Jonathan Coghill	Nominated
Most Performed Australian Work Overseas
Title	Artist	Writer	Result
"Love Is in the Air"	John Paul Young	Harry Vanda, George Young	Won
Most Performed Country Work
Title	Artist	Writer	Result
"Lead Me Home"	Carter and Carter	Merelyn Carter, David Carter	Won
"Raining on the Plains"	Sara Storer, Douglas Storer, Garth Porter	Merelyn Carter, David Carter	Nominated
"Way It Is"	Lee Kernaghan	Lee Kernaghan, Garth Porter	Nominated
"Something in the Water"	Lee Kernaghan	Lee Kernaghan, Garth Porter, Colin Buchanan	Nominated
"Wish I Was a Train"	Troy Cassar-Daley, Paul Kelly	Troy Cassar-Daley, Paul Kelly	Nominated
Most Performed Dance Work
Title	Artist	Writer	Result
"Bang This"	J-Wess	James Essex, Andrew Gardner	Nominated
"Danger"	Katie Underwood	Katie Underwood, Simon Hosford, James Kempster	Nominated
"One of My Kind"	Rogue Traders	James Appleby, Steve Davis, Andrew Farriss, Michael Hutchence	Nominated
"Tonight"	Amiel	Amiel Daemion, Barry Palmer, Stuart Crichton	Nominated
"U Talkin' to Me"	Disco Montego	Darren Dowlut, Dennis Dowlut, Robert Woolf	Won
Most Performed Foreign Work
Title	Artist	Writer	Result
"Beautiful"	Christina Aguilera	Linda Perry	Nominated
"Unwell"	Matchbox Twenty	Robert Thomas	Nominated
"I'm with You"	Avril Lavigne	Avril Lavigne, Scott Spock, Lauren Christy, Graham Edwards	Nominated
"Lost Without You"	Delta Goodrem	Bridget Benenate, Matthew Gerrard	Nominated
"Big Yellow Taxi"	Counting Crows	Joni Mitchell	Won
Most Performed Jazz Work
Title	Artist	Writer	Result
"Stars Apart"	Allan Browne	Paul Grabowsky	Nominated
"Solitude"	Fiona Burnett	Fiona Burnett	Nominated
"Mandella"	Guy Strazzullo	Guy Strazzullo	Nominated
"If You Love Me"	Sharny Russell	Sharny Russell	Won
"East St Kilda Toodle Oo"	Allan Browne	John Scurry	Nominated
=== Classical Music Awards ===
Best Composition by an Australian Composer
Title		Composer	Result
Learning to Howl		Andrew Ford	Won
Best Performance of an Australian Composition
Title	Composer	Performer	Result
Time and the Bell	Peter Rankine	Richard Haynes	Won
Instrumental Work of the Year
Title	Composer	Performer	Result
Rumba Flamenca	Gareth Koch	Saffire Guitar Quartet	Nominated
Stoneworks	Richard Charlton	Saffire Guitar Quartet	Won
Threnody	Peter Sculthorpe	Patricia Pollett	Nominated
The Room of the Saints	Gerard Brophy	Patricia Pollett	Nominated
Long-Term Contribution to the Advancement of Australian Music
Artist or Organisation			Result
Felix Werder			Won
Orchestral Work of the Year
Title	Composer	Performer	Result
"Love Duet" – Oboe Concerto	Ross Edwards	Diana Doherty	Nominated
Love Me Sweet	Carl Vine	Diana Doherty	Nominated
Pipe Dreams	Carl Vine	Australian Chamber Orchestra	Nominated
This Insubstantial Pageant	Gordon Kerry	West Australian Symphony Orchestra	Won
Most Distinguished Contribution to the Presentation of Australian Composition by an Individual
Individual		Work	Result
Patricia Pollett		Still Life	Won
Most Distinguished Contribution to the Presentation of Australian Composition by an Organisation
Organisation		Work	Result
West Australian Symphony Orchestra			Won
Most Distinguished Contribution to the Advancement of Australian Music in Education
Organisation		Work	Result
Lyn Carr		2003 Keys National Piano Competition	Won
Most Distinguished Contribution to the Advancement of Australian Music in a Regional Area
Organisation		Work	Result
Queensland Biennial Festival of Music			Won
Vocal or Choral Work of the Year
Title	Composer	Performer	Result
Berceuse	Gerard Brophy	Sydney Philharmonia Choirs	Won
=== Screen Music Awards ===
Best Feature Film Score
Title		Composer	Result
Japanese Story		Elizabeth Drake	Won
Master and Commander: The Far Side of the World		Iva Davies, Christopher Gordon, Richard Tognetti	Nominated
One Perfect Day		David Hobson, Josh G. Abrahams, Lisa Gerrard, Paul van Dyk	Nominated
The Wannabes		David Hirschfelder	Nominated
Best Music for an Advertisement
Title		Composer	Result
Lux Lift Plus		Paul Healy, Antony Partos	Won
Qantas Recharge		Carlo Giacco	Nominated
Surflifesavers – "Last Patrol"		Christopher Elves	Nominated
Toyota Landcruiser – “Snakebite”		Bruce Heald, Mark Rivett	Nominated
Best Music for Children's Television
Title		Composer	Result
Active Kidz		Scott Ehler, Glenn Heaton, Geoffrey McGarvey, Amy Wilkins	Won
Fergus McPhail		Jamie Saxe	Nominated
New MacDonald's Farm		Jay Somerville Collie	Nominated
Tabaluga and Leo – A Christmas Adventure		Guy Gross	Nominated
Best Music for a Documentary
Title		Composer	Result
Poisonous Women		Christopher Elves	Won
Roger		Tamara O'Brien	Nominated
Silent Storm		Guy Gross	Nominated
Troubled Minds		Dale Cornelius	Nominated
Best Music for an Educational, Training or Corporate Film/Video
Title		Composer	Result
BenQ		Alison Cole, David Smith	Nominated
Docklands		Robert Upward	Nominated
Ocean to Outback		Ashley Klose	Nominated
Qantas Entertainment		Barbara Griffin	Won
Best Music for a Mini-Series or Telemovie
Title		Composer	Result
Floodhouse		Amanda Brown	Nominated
Marking Time		Martin Armiger	Nominated
Salem's Lot		Christopher Gordon, Lisa Gerrard	Nominated
Shark Net		Alan John	Won
Best Music for a Short Film
Title		Composer	Result
Black Berries		James Lee	Nominated
The Scree		Adrian Van De Velde	Won
Syntax Error		Andrew Lancaster, David McCormack, Antony Partos	Nominated
The Tooth		Elliott Wheeler	Nominated
Best Music for a Television Series or Serial
Series or Serial	Episode title	Composer	Result
CrashBurn	"Episode 13"	Burkhard Dallwitz	Won
McLeod's Daughters	"Episode 73"	Alastair Ford	Nominated
MDA	"Series 2 – Episode 27"	Roger Mason	Nominated
The Secret Life of Us	"Series 3 – Episode 19"	Chris Pettifer	Nominated
Best Original Song Composed for a Feature Film, Telemovie, TV Series or Mini-Series
Song title	Work	Composer	Result
"Freedom Song"	Floodhouse	Amanda Brown, Miro Bilbrough	Nominated
"Bitter Plum"	Somersault	Amanda Brown	Nominated
"Somersault"	Somersault	Kenny Davis, Benjamin Ely, Matthew Fitzgerald, Peter Kelly, Lenka Kripac, Tom Schutzinger (see Decoder Ring)	Won
"Back Home to You"	The Honourable Wally Norman	John Bartholomeusz, Colin Swan	Nominated
Best Soundtrack Album
Title		Composer	Result
Bad Eggs		David Graney, Clare Moore	Nominated
Master and Commander: The Far Side of the World		Iva Davies, Christopher Gordon, Richard Tognetti	Won
Salem's Lot		Christopher Gordon, Lisa Gerrard	Nominated
Somersault		Kenny Davis, Benjamin Ely, Matthew Fitzgerald, Peter Kelly, Lenka Kripac, Tom Schutzinger (see Decoder Ring)	Nominated
Best Television Theme
Title		Composer	Result
CrashBurn		Burkhard Dallwitz	Nominated
"EE II EE II OO (New MacDonald's Farm Theme)"		Barbara Griffin, Latu Harper	Nominated
The Einstein Factor		Michael Lira	Won
"If Only"		Carlo Giacco	Nominated
International Achievement Award
Artist			Result
Lisa Gerrard			Won

== See also ==
- Music of Australia
