= 2004 Palm Island death in custody =

2004 death in custody of an Aboriginal man in Queensland

The 2004 Palm Island death in custody incident relates to the death of an Aboriginal resident of Palm Island in Queensland, Australia, Cameron Doomadgee (also known as "Mulrunji") on Friday, 19 November 2004 in a police cell. The death of Mulrunji led to civic disturbances on the island and a legal, political and media sensation that continued for fourteen years.

The Attorney-General of Queensland, Kerry Shine, indicted an Australian police officer for a criminal trial for the first time since the public prosecutor's office was established. The officer, Senior Sergeant Chris Hurley, who was charged for a death in custody, was acquitted by the jury in June 2007. Hurley medically retired from the Gold Coast station of the Queensland Police in 2017 following a string of charges while serving as a police officer including assault and dangerous driving.

Police raids and behaviour following the community riot were found to have breached the Racial Discrimination Act 1975, with a record class action settlement of A$30 million awarded to victims in May 2018.

Two legal questions arose from the death; firstly, whether the taking into custody of Mulrunji was lawful, and secondly, whether the injuries that led to his death were illegally caused by the arresting officer.

Politically, this event raised questions relating to the federal government's 1987–1991 Royal Commission into Aboriginal Deaths in Custody and whether its recommendations to prevent deaths in custody had been implemented by the government.

== The death of Cameron Doomadgee ==
Cameron Doomadgee, an Aboriginal Australian, was aged 36 when he died, at about 11:20am on Palm Island, one hour after being picked up for allegedly causing a public nuisance. Mulrunji was placed in the two-cell lockup which was the back section of the Palm Island Police Station. Fellow Palm Islander Patrick Bramwell was placed in the adjoining cell.

The arresting officer, Senior Sergeant Chris Hurley, and the Indigenous police liaison officer, Lloyd Bengaroo, were flown off the island the following Monday, after receiving death threats and Hurley's house being burned down.

This was the 147th death of an Aboriginal person in custody since the handing down of the Royal Commission into Aboriginal Deaths in Custody.

An autopsy report by Coroner Michael Barnes was produced for the family one week after the death. It stated that Mulrunji had suffered four broken ribs, which had ruptured his liver and spleen, it also found that the body's blood alcohol content was 0.29 from a cocktail of alcohol including methylated spirits mixed with sweet cordial. The family of the deceased were informed by the Coroner that the death was the result of "an intra-abdominal haemorrhage caused by a ruptured liver and portal vein".

Main points from media reports after interviews with residents and relatives stated:

- Mulrunji visited his new baby niece early on the morning of 19 November 2004;
- He was drinking beer at the time but was not considered to be drunk;
- He was carrying a bucket with a mud crab which he was going to sell;
- He then walked from his mother and sister's house to Dee Street where he was picked up;
- He was walking along the street singing "Who Let the Dogs Out?" when Hurley drove past.

Hurley is a white Australian who was also aged 36 at the time of the incident. He had spent the morning investigating complaints by sisters Gladys, Andrea and Anna Nugent that Roy Bramwell had assaulted them. One of the sisters needed to be airlifted to Townsville Hospital due to her condition as a result of Bramwell's assault.

Gladys requested that Hurley accompany her so that she could safely get medication from Bramwell's house. Hurley drove her to the house in the police vehicle. While Gladys retrieved her medication, Patrick Bramwell was outside. He appeared intoxicated and was swearing at the police. His grandmother complained to Hurley, who then arrested him.

Meanwhile Mulrunji taunted Bengaroo with words to the effect of "why does he help lock up his own people?". Hurley then reentered the car and talked with Bengaroo briefly. Mulrunji who had walked away, turned and allegedly swore at the police officers. Hurley drove over to Mulrunji and arrested him for creating a public nuisance, after which Mulrunji was taken in the back of the police vehicle for the short trip to the police station.

Doomadgee family spokesman, Brad Foster, claimed that after the men had been put into the cells, fifteen minutes lapsed before a seven-second check was done on the inmates. Forty-two minutes later a second police officer observed that Mulrunji was a strange colour and was cold to the touch. The officer could not find a pulse. When alerted to this, Hurley came into the cell and thought he could detect a pulse. According to statements an ambulance was then called taking fifteen minutes to arrive. During this time no attempts were made to resuscitate the prisoner, although the autopsy found that there would have been no chance of saving him. The videotape footage from the cell shows Hurley checking for breathing and pulse then "sliding down the wall of the cell until he sat with his face in his hands".

When Mulrunji's sister brought lunch for him to the front section of the police station, she was not informed of events and was told to leave. The family and the state coroner were informed of the death at about 3pm that afternoon. Police began taking statements from witnesses. Procedures for taking of statements from illiterate Aboriginal people were not followed, including the requirement to have a representative present who understands the process (preferably a legal representation).

The Doomadgee family later stated that the Queensland Government's response had not been to provide counselling for the family but to send in 18 extra police from Townsville who "strut around this community, looking intimidating".

For the following week public meetings were held on the Island due to anger rising in the community about the death.

== Autopsy report ==
On Friday 26 November 2004 the results of the autopsy report were read to a public meeting by then Palm Island Council Chairwoman Erykah Kyle. The autopsy report was medical and did not state what caused his death. It did list possible causes which included that the multiple injuries sustained could have been consistent with him falling off a concrete step at the Palm Island watchhouse. The injury may have been caused by Hurley falling on the deceased.

The deceased was 181 cm tall and weighed 74 kilograms. Hurley was 201 cm tall and weighed 115 kilograms. The Coroner later stated that the autopsy was "far too sensitive and private" to be publicly released. Subsequent to the autopsy report reading a succession of angry young Aboriginal men spoke to the crowd and encouraged immediate action be taken against the police. Mulrunji's death was repeatedly branded "cold-blooded murder". A riot erupted involving an estimated 400 people, half of them school children.

== Riot, police raids, and racial discrimination ==
A crowd headed initially for the police station. The local courthouse, police station, Hurley's home and the police barracks were burned down. Eighteen local police had to repeatedly retreat; firstly receding from the station to the residential barracks, then when the barracks were also set alight they (and their families) withdrew to the hospital and barricaded themselves in. Cars and machinery were driven onto the runway, blocking all aircraft movement. Even the (Aboriginal) volunteer fire brigade had stones thrown at them while they tried to put out the courthouse and police station fires.

The volatile situation was attributed to the lack of consultation with the family and community combined with the premature public release of the autopsy report. They appeared to have jumped to a conclusion given their description of the death as "cold blooded murder".

As the riot occurred during the school lunch break, it was witnessed by many children. As a way of helping them understand and cope with the on-going trauma they had experienced, children were later encouraged to express themselves through art, one of the resulting pieces was titled "We saw the police station burn. I want people to have love".

Numerous police officers were flown into Palm Island following the riot. Police officers in riot gear, wearing balaclavas, with no identification and carrying large guns, marched into the community, conducting early-morning raids. Residents report officers pointing guns at children's heads and being tasered. A resident and his partner were later awarded A$235,000 in compensation for assault, battery and false imprisonment.

=== Class action ===
Police actions were later found to breach the Racial Discrimination Act 1975, with the raids being "unnecessary, disproportionate" and police having "acted in these ways because they were dealing with an Aboriginal community".

The raids resulted in a record A$30 million class action settlement and a formal apology to be made by the State Government.

== Emergency response, Public Safety Preservation Act ==
Later the same day approximately 80 additional police from Townsville and Cairns were flown to Palm Island to restore order. Part of the flown in police contingent was the tactical response group who wore riot shields, balaclavas and helmets with face-masks, Glock pistol at the hip and a shotgun or semi-automatic rifle in their right hand. They converted the Bwgcolman Community School into a headquarters and sleeping barracks, and the St Michael's school bus was commandeered.

During the weekend the tactical response group searched many homes. Children witnessed their parents being arrested and taken to Townsville for committing crimes such as public drunkenness and common assault.

Premier Peter Beattie visited Palm Island on Sunday 28 November, producing a five-point plan to restore order to local leaders. There was much debate over the appropriateness of the police and government response to the riot. Complaints were made that Aboriginal Legal Aid had been denied access to the Island. Queensland Police Union President Denis Fitzpatrick demanded the rioters be charged with attempted murder of 12 police. The police who had been stationed on the island indicated through the Union that they did not wish to return to Island duties.

An emergency situation was declared under the Public Safety Preservation Act 1986 (the Act) on the afternoon of the riot. It was lifted two days later, just before the Premier's arrival. Later the timing of the "emergency" was disputed by lawyers for the Palm Island community. The lawyers maintained two key points, firstly that the emergency could only last for as long as the riot itself and secondly the police did not have extended search and detain powers under the Act that they had relied upon.

=== Court proceedings ===
A total of 28 Indigenous Australians were arrested and charged with offences ranging from arson to riotous behaviour in the weeks following the riot.

Initially 13 Palm Islanders were arrested and charged. They appeared before the Townsville Magistrates Court on Monday 29 November 2004, the first business day after the riot. The Palm Islanders faced charges of riot, arson and assault. The Magistrate determined that due to the "state of emergency" it would be too dangerous to allow the defendants to return to Palm Island, therefore bail was not considered.

On 1 December 2004 three more rioters were arrested, all women: a 65-year-old grandmother, her daughter, and the daughter of a Palm Island Councillor.

By 6 December 2004, 19 accused were granted bail by the Queensland Chief Magistrate. Conditions were imposed such as not being allowed to return to Palm Island, not even for the funeral of Mulrunji. Another notable condition of bail was that they were not to attend rallies or marches over the death in custody. The circumstances leading up to the riot were taken into consideration when bail was considered. It was reasoned that if they stayed in a different community in Townsville there was a low likelihood of re-offending.

Four people were prosecuted for the riot and were acquitted.

==== Lex Wotton ====
Lex Wotton was warned by a Brisbane court in 2006 to comply with the original conditions of bail, to discontinue his public appearances at rallies and marches. Wotton initially pleaded guilty to the charge of rioting, and was found guilty at trial. After others were acquitted, he successfully challenged the legal proceedings and withdrew his guilty plea in May 2007.

== Investigation ==
Mulrunji's Family had suspicions about the results of the first autopsy by the Queensland government pathologist. They delayed Mulrunji's funeral and insisted that the Coroner order a second "independent autopsy" to be observed by a pathologist on behalf of the Doomadgee family. The family also hired a private investigator to conduct an independent investigation of the death.

== Overturned coronial inquiry ==
On 8 February 2005 an initial one-day directions hearing for a full coronial inquiry into the death in custody was held. It was decided by Coroner Michael Barnes that the inquiry would take place on the island so that the people of Palm Island would have the opportunity to observe the process; however medical evidence and evidence given by police officers was to be taken in open court in Townsville due to logistical issues and safety concerns of the police. The inquiry would begin on 28 February 2005. Barnes was assisted by two senior counsel. The directions hearing was held in a marquee, because there were no premises on the island large enough for the expected audience. 16 barristers and solicitors appeared representing the Queensland Government, the Doomadgee family, the Human Rights and Equal Opportunity Commission and the Queensland Police Service. During the directions hearing the Doomadgee family requested that the deceased be referred to by his tribal name "Mulrunji" in line with Aboriginal custom, which was not opposed.

Barnes had previously been the Aboriginal Legal Aid solicitor for two families before the Royal Commission into Aboriginal Deaths in Custody. On the first day of the inquiry the Coroner also disclosed that he had headed the complaints section of the Criminal Justice Commission in the early 1990s, when several complaints had been made about Hurley, but he had not handled the investigation and could not remember the complaints. Although he had not been involved in the investigation, Barnes was the officer who made the final determination that the complaints were unsubstantiated. Lawyers for both the Doomadgee family and Hurley asked that the Coroner disqualify himself (although for different reasons).

The Coroner subsequently disqualified himself, and Deputy State Coroner Christine Clements flew to Townsville and took over. She decided that the inquest would start afresh on 29 March 2005, with a three-day directions hearing in Brisbane.

In late September 2006, Clements found that Doomadgee was killed as a result of punches by Hurley. She also accused the police of failing to investigate his death fully. In response to the coroner's findings, Queensland Police Union president Gary Wilkinson was highly critical, saying that the coroner's use of "unreliable evidence from a drunk" was "simply unbelievable".

The coroner also said that Mulrunji should not have been arrested, and that local police had not learned from the findings of the Royal Commission. Largely supporting this conclusion was that Hurley had considered it necessary to raise similar concerns only a year prior to Mulrunji's death to the Federal Parliamentary Standing Committee on Aboriginal and Torres Strait Islander Affairs. In his submissions to the Committee, Hurley pointed out the lack of an alcohol diversionary centre on Palm Island. He complained "If we attend a job in relation to alcohol where the person has not committed any other offences besides being drunk in public, the only option we have is to take them to the watch-house".

== Director of Public Prosecutions decision ==
Leanne Clare, the Queensland Director of Public Prosecutions (DPP), announced on 14 December 2006 that no charges would be laid as there was no evidence proving that Hurley was responsible for Mulrunji's death. She reportedly received advice from former Supreme Court judge James B. Thomas before making this decision.

== Disciplinary prosecution ==
The incident also resulted in an investigation by the Crime and Misconduct Commission (CMC). Included in the duties of the CMC is investigating allegations of police misconduct. Included in the allegations made against Hurley was that he wrongfully caused the death of Mulrunji. Although Prosecution were concerned with disciplinary proceedings rather than criminal court proceedings, the CMC reached the same conclusion as the DPP in relation to Hurley being criminally responsible for causing the death. They advised that "The Commission has determined that the evidence would not be capable of proving before any disciplinary tribunal that Senior Sergeant Hurley was responsible for Mulrunji's death".

=== Review of DPP decision ===
After several days of media and public pressure, Queensland Attorney-General, Kerry Shine, appointed retired Justice Pat Shanahan to review the DPP's decision not to lay charges against the police officer. Shanahan resigned after it was revealed he had sat on the panel that originally appointed Clare as DPP in 1999. Former Chief Justice of the Supreme Court of New South Wales, Sir Laurence Street, was selected to review the decision not to charge Hurley over the death of Mulrunji.

The review resulted in the overturning of the DPP's decision, with Street finding there was sufficient evidence to prosecute Hurley with manslaughter. This was the first time since the public prosecutor's office was established in Queensland that anyone other than the DPP made a decision concerning whether or not to indict an individual.

=== Trial ===
In June 2007, the Townsville-based trial of Chris Hurley on charges of assault and manslaughter took place. Hurley was found not guilty after medical evidence was given which discredited claims by other witnesses of an assault by Hurley upon Doomadgee. Public funded investigation and prosecution alone cost at least A$7 million.

=== District Court appeal ===
In September 2008, Hurley's lawyers appealed Coroner Clements' findings (September 2006) that he had killed Mulrunji with three fatal punches.

On 17 December 2008 District Court Judge Bob Pack, in Townsville, ruled that Clements' finding "..was against the weight of the evidence..", so upholding Hurley's appeal, requiring a new coronial inquiry and outraging local Aboriginal people who feared this would "..only dig up buried bones..".

=== Supreme Court appeal ===
In May 2009, Mulrunji's family's lawyers commenced proceeding in the Queensland Supreme Court, attempting to have Judge Pack's decision ruled invalid.

The Court noted that because Bramwell did not have a clear view of the incident, the Coroner concluded that the punches described by Bramwell hit the abdomen or torso of the deceased rather than the head, and this caused the death. They further noted that the medical evidence before the Coroner allowed for the possibility that punches were one possible explanation for the facial injuries or bruises, but the medical evidence unequivocally rejected punching described by Bramwell as a cause of death.

They noted that the Coroner did not refer to that evidence in her report. They quoted the Coroner's observations about the cause of death and that the "consensus of medical opinion was that severe compressive force applied to the upper abdomen, or possibly the lower chest, or both together, was required to have caused this injury", and that "medical witnesses were asked to consider whether the application of a knee or an elbow, whilst [the deceased] was on the hard flat surface, either during or separate to the fall could have caused the mechanism of injury. This was accepted as a possible means by which the injury could have occurred". (By comparison, even in 2012 a journalist publicly maintained the view that the medical consensus regarding the possibility the injury could have been caused during the fall was incorrect. Documentary film director Tony Krawitz opined in an interview that "something really violent happened" and shortly after stated "It wasn't treated as a murder investigation which is what was meant to have happened.")

The Court concluded that the Coroner's finding that Hurley caused the death by punching was not reasonably open on the evidence.

The Court then addressed the Attorney-General and the appellants' argument that only the Coroner's finding that punching caused the fatal injuries should be set aside as a result of the medical evidence.

The Attorney General and appellants submitted that if punching is set aside there should be an inevitable finding that the fatal injuries were due to a deliberate application of force by Chris Hurley after the fall, e.g. a knee drop. The Court did not accept that inevitably follows and pointed out that Bramwell's evidence could be said not to "leave room for such an occurrence". (Bramwell was an exclusive witness for only 6 to 10 seconds, and volunteered incriminating evidence at the Coronial hearing that Hurley punched Mulrunji. However, he made no claim that Hurley did a knee drop during that time.) However they emphasised that they were merely addressing the submission, not making findings on fact as that is not their function in hearing the appeal. Instead they ordered that the Coronial Inquiry be reopened to re-examine the facts as the original Coronial Inquiry findings were set aside.

=== Coronial inquiry ===
On 14 May 2010 a new full coronial inquiry into the death in custody concluded. During the course of the coronial enquiry it was revealed that a police witness Senior Sergeant Michael Leafe originally estimated that Hurley was alone with Mulrunji for 10 seconds but changed it to 6 or 7 seconds after reenacting his actions during that time and timing it on the request of Hurley's lawyer. At trial he only gave his revised estimate. Prosecutor Peter Davis suggested that this (the fact of giving a shorter estimate in court not the out of court attempt to get a more accurate estimate) was an attempt to sabotage prosecutors. However, Leafe said he believed Hurley's prosecution was a cynical political exercise.

In his findings, Coroner Brian Hine disagreed with the Supreme Court of Appeal regarding the knee drop. He believed that the evidence left room for a finding that a knee drop may have occurred. He found that the injuries could have been caused by Hurley accidentally falling on top of Mulrunji, or by the officer "dropping a knee into his torso". He said that due to the unreliability of police and Aboriginal witnesses he could not make a definitive finding. However, he found that Hurley punched Mulrunji in the face and abused him while attempting to get him into the station, and found that police colluded to protect Hurley. A CMC report leaked to the media reportedly recommends that 7 officers will face charges.

=== Palm Island Select Committee ===
In April 2005, Premier Beattie established the Palm Island Select Committee to investigate issues leading to the riot and other problems. Their report was tabled on 25 August 2005. It detailed 65 recommendations which seek to reduce violence and overcrowding, and improve standards of education and health. In achieving these objectives, issues such as drug and alcohol abuse and unemployment would also be addressed.

=== Palm Island death surrounding controversy ===
Patrick Bramwell, a cell-mate of Mulrunji, repeatedly attempted to set himself on fire after giving evidence before the first coronial inquest. Bramwell would later commit suicide on 16 January 2007.

== Police union and Aboriginal activists ==
Soon after the riot, the Queensland Police Union President Denis Fitzpatrick demanded the rioters be charged with attempted murder of 12 police. The police who had been stationed on the island indicated through the Union that they did not wish to return. Former Premier Wayne Goss dismissed as "cheap politics" the union's demand for attempted murder charges to be laid, he said their comments since the death in custody had been consistently unhelpful.

After the alleged rioters were granted bail Queensland Police Union President Denis Fitzpatrick criticised the magistrate's decision to grant bail saying that the safety of the community had been put last and that the decision amounted to a "betrayal" of the police. His comment was criticised as hypocritical and systematic of "one rule for us and one for whites and that's a racist legal system where the cops get their way" by Burketown Aboriginal activist Murrandoo Yanner and relative of the Doomadgee family was at the centre of controversy over his calls for Aboriginal people to bash all "racist cops" and for all police stations to be burnt. Yanner said that Hurley was no racist, that he was loved by the Indigenous communities he had previously worked in, and that he identified with Hurley in that "he was a thug and a mug. I am the same", and that they would both respond with fists when confronted or challenged, portraying a cop who some years ago had confronted and overcome his own inherent racism while working in the Torres Strait. Yanner said his anger was with the legal system in general and particularly the police's role in justice for Indigenous people, saying that Hurley was an exception to these problems, but that he had probably gone too far in giving Mulrunji a hiding.

Sen. Sgt. Chris Hurley received a confidential payout of A$100,000 from the Queensland Government in February 2005. In mid-February 2005 Chris Hurley resumed duties after three months on paid leave. He was appointed to a duty officer position at the Broadbeach police station on the Gold Coast

The Queensland Government agreed to provide a confidential payout of A$370,000 to Mulrunji's family in May 2011.

When Coroner Barnes disqualified himself from the inquiry the QPU called for him to be sacked immediately from the position of state coroner for the indiscretion of drinking with one of the lawyers during the inquest.

After Coroner Clements made her findings but before they were overturned by the District and Supreme Courts as being inconsistent with the evidence QPU President Gary Wilkinson was highly critical. As a result he was charged with contempt of court by the Attorney General. Wilkinson later publicly apologised and pleaded guilty to the contempt. He was ordered to pay costs with no other punishment.

After the Attorney General's decision to prosecute was made public members of the Union held rallies in every major city in Queensland protesting against the political intervention, and in support of Senior Sergeant Chris Hurley.

The Police Union were apparently incensed that a police officer should be the first person in Queensland since the public prosecutor's office was established to be indicted based on a decision of someone other than the DPP and argued that it amounted to political interference in the Justice System. After the trial concluded the Union released advertisements against the Beattie Queensland government, comparing the government to Robert Mugabe and his government. More specifically the ad stated: "Zimbabwe is a good example of what could happen where politicians override the laws to suit themselves."

== Coverage in news media and the arts ==
In 2007, Tony Koch, The Australian's chief reporter in Queensland, won the Graham Perkin Australian Journalist of the Year Award for his coverage of the 2004 Palm Island death in custody and related events.

In 2007, Brisbane-based band Powderfinger wrote a song Black Tears which mentioned the Palm Island death in custody by the words "An island watch-house bed, a black man's lying dead". The song was to be released as part of their 2007 album Dream Days at the Hotel Existence. Fearing that the lyrics of the song might prejudice the case against their client, Chris Hurley's legal team referred the song to Queensland's Attorney-General, Kerry Shine, in an attempt to get the song banned or the lyrics changed. Although band's management claimed that while the lyrics of the song reference the Chris Hurley case, that they were not specific enough to warrant a ban, they changed the lyrics of the song before releasing the album.

In 2008, journalist and novelist Chloe Hooper, published the book The Tall Man: Death and Life on Palm Island, which won multiple awards in 2009.

In 2010, artist Vernon Ah Kee created a four-screen video installation at the Museum of Contemporary Art in Sydney, entitled Tall Man.

In 2012, filmmaker Tony Krawitz, won the Walkley Foundation Long-form Journalism: Documentary award for his documentary film based on Hooper's book, titled The Tall Man.

== Chris Hurley career ==
Within a month of Doomadgee's death, Hurley was transferred to the Gold Coast where he medically retired in 2017, following a string of charges including assault and dangerous driving.

In 2010, Hurley was forced to repay $34,980 in insurance payments after allegations of insurance fraud following the 2004 riot.

Chris Hurley faced disciplinary actions after being transferred to the Gold Coast including for:

- Assaulting a motorist in November 2013. Hurley mistakenly believed a passing motorist had insulted him and gave chase, driving erratically before grabbing the man by the throat.
- Dangerous driving in which shots were allegedly fired at a getaway car in May 2015. Hurley allegedly had fired his gun twice during the wild chase, despite being instructed multiple times to terminate the pursuit.
- Assaulting a female colleague in February 2016. Hurley had allegedly grabbed and dragged the woman at a local shopping centre, swearing at her over a private matter.

== Timeline ==
Timeline
Date	Event
8 July 2003	Chris Hurley points out lack of alcohol diversionary program on Palm Island meaning that the only option for drunk and disorderly Palm Islanders is to take them to the watchhouse.
19 November 2004	Mulrunji, 36, dies in custody at Palm Island police station after being arrested for being drunk and causing a nuisance.
26 November 2004	Palm Islanders riot. Police officers seek refuge at the island's hospital and are airlifted to safety. Rioters burn down the police station, courthouse and the home of officer-in-charge Senior Sergeant Chris Hurley.
27 November 2004	Dozens of police officers are flown into Palm Island. Police officers in riot gear wearing balaclavas with no identification, carrying large guns march into the community conducting early-morning raids. Residents report officers pointing guns at children's heads and being tasered. A resident and his partner were later awarded $235,000 compensation for assault, battery and false imprisonment. Police actions were later found to breach the Racial Discrimination Act, with the raids being "unnecessary, disproportionate" and police having "acted in these ways because they were dealing with an Aboriginal community." The raids, found to be racist, resulted in a record $30 million class action settlement.
1 December 2004	State Coroner Michael Barnes orders a second autopsy be conducted.
3 December 2004	Private investigator hired to carry out an independent investigation into Mulrunji's death.
11 December 2004	Doomadgee funeral, Palm Island elders call for justice rather than division.
11 February 2005	Chris Hurley receives a confidential payout of A$102,955 from the Queensland Government.
28 February 2005	Coronial inquiry into Mulrunji's death begins.
1 March 2005	The inquest proceedings are stalled after allegations of bias are made against Mr Barnes.
4 March 2005	State Coroner Michael Barnes stands down from the inquiry after claims of bias.
30 March 2005	Second inquiry begins with Deputy Coroner Christine Clements as Acting Coroner.
27 February 2006	The inquest resumes on Palm Island for two days, and then for the following three days in Townsville
27 September 2006	Deputy Coroner Christine Clements finds Snr Sgt Hurley responsible for Mulrunji's fatal injuries.
7 October 2006	Senior Sgt Hurley stood down following the coroner's findings.
14 December 2006	Queensland Director of Public Prosecutions Leanne Clare announces that no charges will be laid against Senior Sergeant Chris Hurley over Mulrunji's death.
14 December 2006	Criminal Misconduct Commission announces that no disciplinary charges will be laid against Senior Sergeant Chris Hurley over Mulrunji's death.
4 January 2007	Former NSW chief justice Sir Laurence Street starts review of DPP's decision.
16 January 2007	Witness Patrick Bramwell hangs himself on Palm Island.
26 January 2007	Sir Laurence advises there is enough evidence to prosecute Snr Sgt Hurley, who is officially suspended.
5 February 2007	Snr Sgt Hurley faces Supreme Court charged with manslaughter and assault.
6 February 2007	Queensland police halt plans to march on state parliament over Snr Sgt Hurley being charged after Premier Peter Beattie accedes to demands for closed circuit cameras in watchhouses in Aboriginal communities.
16 March 2007	Justice Kerry Cullinane sets down a two-week trial to start on 12 June in the Townsville Supreme Court for Snr Sgt Hurley.
22 March 2007	William Neville Blackman, John Major Clumpoint, Dwayne Daniel Blanket, and Lance Gabriel Poynter are found not guilty of rioting with destruction by a Brisbane Supreme Court jury.
April; 2007	Crime and Misconduct Commission announces a review of policing in indigenous communities.
8 May 2007	Terrence Alfred Kidner sentenced to 16 months in jail in Townsville District Court after pleading guilty to rioting on Palm Island.
31 May 2007	Accused rioter Lex Wotton succeeds in Brisbane District Court application to be released from custody on bail with strict conditions, formally entering a plea of not guilty to rioting with destruction on Palm Island.
5 June 2007	State budget announces boost to police numbers in indigenous communities, more CCTV cameras for watchhouses.
10 June 2007	Queensland Police Minister announces an extra 29 police officers for indigenous communities.
12 June 2007	Hurley case begins in Townsville Supreme Court. Large group of Palm Islanders and police turns up to watch.
15 June 2007	Snr Sgt Hurley breaks silence, testifying in his own defence. Says he has come to terms with the fact he caused the death, but strongly denies any intention to cause harm.
20 June 2007	Jury acquits Hurley on manslaughter and assault charges.
September; 2008	Lawyers for Chris Hurley appeal to Queensland's District Court to overturn Deputy Coroner Christine Clement's 26 September 2006 findings that he had fatally injured Mulurunji
17 December 2008	Townsville District Court Judge Bob Pack hands down a ruling upholding Chris Hurley's appeal and ordering a fresh inquest in Mulurunji's death.
16 June 2009	Queensland Court of Appeal hands down a ruling affirming that the Coroner's findings be overturned, revealing that the Coroner's report failed to mention that medical evidence unequivocally rejected that punching could have caused the death, and ordering a fresh inquest in Mulurunji's death.

== Aftermath ==
Mulrinji Doomadgee's son committed suicide in 2006, and many other family members reported being traumatised by the event.

=== Memorial ===
In 2020 a memorial plaque to Mulrinji was erected by Palm Island Aboriginal Council outside the police station on Palm Island, reading:

In memory of Mulrinji / whose life was tragically taken on 19th November 2004. / We also acknowledge all those who lost their lives in custody across Australia. / Now at peace / #blacklivesmatter#

In November 2020, the memorial was moved to the garden of his sister, Valmai Aplin, as it was getting vandalised by children in its earlier location, just before the anniversary of Mulrinji's death.

=== 20th anniversary ===
The 20th anniversary of Mulrinji Doomadgee's death was commemorated on 19 November 2024 with a cultural ceremony led by his brother Alec. The issue of Aboriginal deaths in custody was still continuing and Queensland Police were taking steps to address it.

== Related political controversies ==
=== Air fare affair ===
Then Queensland Indigenous Policy Minister Liddy Clark offered for activist Murandoo Yanner and Carpentaria Land Council chief executive Brad Foster to accompany her to Palm Island in the weeks after the riot.

The Minister and her office told The Australian newspaper the Government paid for the tickets in order to expedite the purchasing of the tickets at such short notice; both Yanner and Foster had agreed to reimburse the Government later for the cost of the tickets. According to Yanner and Foster, Minister Clark's Senior Policy Advisor had asked them to fabricate a story for the public that they had agreed to reimburse the cost of the flights, while assuring them they would not have to pay.

Beattie ordered the Minister to pay the A$1,775 herself although he would not go as far as to fire her over the controversy unless there was an adverse criminal or misconduct finding, he said that Yanner had no credibility, the Minister immediately took unscheduled holiday leave. A Crime and Misconduct Commission (CMC) criminal and misconduct investigation was launched into the whole affair, Yanner and Foster refused to cooperate with the investigation. Clark and her Senior Policy Advisor were interviewed at length by the CMC. Clark maintained that she had never spoken to Yanner or Foster, that she had not directed her Senior Policy Advisor to politically cover for her with the alleged deal and that Yanner and Foster were definitely told that they would have to pay the airfare back. The CMC demanded that the Australian Broadcasting Corporation (ABC) hand over the tapes and backup tapes of particular interviews with Yanner and Foster which were central to the investigation, the interviews then had to be deleted from ABC audio and computers.

Even though the Minister had already personally paid the cost of the airfare the Queensland Government ministerial services still pursued Yanner and Foster for the money on behalf of Ms. Clark however they refused to pay.

On 1 March 2005 the CMC released its draft report, finding that the office of the Minister for Indigenous Affairs had lied over the airfare affair to avoid short-term political embarrassment, sending a deliberately misleading statement to The Australian. The Minister Liddy Clark, who was a former Play School presenter, immediately resigned from the Cabinet to become a backbencher. The Premier accepted responsibility for giving "a new minister such a tough portfolio". Liddy Clark and the two ministerial staff denied deliberately misleading the public.

The adverse finding was based on a media statement to The Australian which made the positive statement; "we agreed to assist with the airline bookings on the understanding that they would pick up the cost" when it was known at the time by the Minister that the possibility of the airfares being repaid was only mooted after the tickets had been booked. The CMC noted that it was not improper for the flights to have been paid by taxpayers, nor was it improper to ask for it to be reimbursed, the lying to escape political fallout was the only issue of misconduct. "The mischief lies in what was an abandonment of the truth to avoid the possibility of short-term political embarrassment."

=== ALP branch revolt ===
Some months after the riot the 24-member Labor Party (ALP) branch on Palm Island publicly revolted against Queensland Premier Peter Beattie, writing a letter to him through local State Member Mike Reynolds outlining grievances against the State Government Labor Party administration. The letter stated that the branch was active in organising protests against the Premier and his upcoming opening of a new Queensland Police Youth Club facility on Palm Island. The letter even hinted at a desire among members to defect to the Liberal Party, stating that under Labor living conditions have not improved on the island, and life expectancy had fallen.

=== Police youth centre ===
In a general atmosphere where there was high levels of local animosity towards the police in the months following the riot, the Queensland Government coincidentally had completed construction of a new multi-million dollar community centre which would be primarily under the control of the Police Youth Club Association. Premier Peter Beattie was due to open the new facility in February 2005, in the lead-up to the launch (while the Coronial inquiry was just beginning) Mr Beattie was asked not to proceed with the launch by the Doomadgee family. Additionally the Palm Island Council moved a resolution asking that the Centre not be opened until its use and occupancy could be agreed upon between the State and Local Governments. The resolution specifically asked that the Centre not be in the possession of the Police Citizens Youth Club Association or the Queensland Police Service.

The Government agreed in advance that the Centre would no longer have the word "Police" in its title however the opening by the Premier was to proceed as planned. When the Premier opened the centre he was met with a generally hostile reception. The Council boycotted the ceremony and only thirty people attended the ceremony, half of whom were holding placards demanding more money be spent on employment and health services. Beattie said that this reaction was to be expected because of current tensions with the community about police, however facilities like this were a way of building better relations between the community and the police.

By April 2007, the PCYC Centre was reported to be more successful with facilities for numerous sporting, educational and cultural activities; the focal point of re-building positive relations between the police and the community.

== See also ==
- 2004 Redfern riots
- Aboriginal deaths in custody
- Institutional racism
- Queensland Council for Civil Liberties
- Royal Commission into Aboriginal Deaths in Custody
- The Tall Man, 2010 documentary film
