= Lost and Running =

2007 single by Powderfinger

Single by Powderfinger

from the album Dream Days at the Hotel Existence
- B-side: "Down by the Dam"; "The Devil Is in the Detail"
- Released: 12 May 2007
- Length: 3:39
- Label: Universal Music Australia
- Songwriters: Jon Coghill; John Collins; Bernard Fanning; Ian Haug; Darren Middleton
- Producer: Rob Schnapf

Powderfinger singles chronology
"Bless My Soul" (2005)	"Lost and Running" (2007)	"I Don't Remember" (2007)

"Lost and Running" is a song by Australian rock group Powderfinger. It was released as the first single from the group's sixth studio album Dream Days at the Hotel Existence. It is the band's twenty-second single and peaked at No. 5 on the Australian chart, the group's second highest-charting single after "My Happiness". It made its radio debut on 13 April on Triple J and was released to wide radio play and the band's MySpace on 16 April 2007. The single was officially released on 12 May 2007.

== Recording and production ==
"Lost and Running" was the first song recorded at Sunset Sound, Los Angeles, as part of Powderfinger's Dream Days at the Hotel Existence recording sessions. The song was also one of the first to be written during the group's two-year hiatus. The band worked with Rob Schnapf for the sessions. Lead singer Bernard Fanning said in April 2007 that the song was more positive than many other Powderfinger works, stating "the music is quite up and hopeful sounding and has a breezy feel to it".

== Musical structure and style ==
The song's time goes through a pattern throughout its entirety of one 4:4 bar, one 2:4 bar and then two 4:4 bars. In writing "Lost and Running", the band was influenced by bands that they have cited as being influences on their music from early on, including David Bowie, The Rolling Stones and Neil Young. In an interview with The Courier Mail, Fanning noted that the song was a very simple one, stating "the actual style of song is quite different as it has very little movement. There are literally only three chords in the song."" He notes that the song's premise is reflective of how the group approached the recording of Dream Days at the Hotel Existence, in that they were unsure of what they wanted to do with the album.

== Music video ==
The music video for "Lost and Running" was directed by Damon Escott and Stephen Lance of Head Pictures. The video clip premiered in Australia on 21 April 2007.

The video features Bernard Fanning, the band's lead vocalist, walking around dressed as a hotel porter, pushing a hotel luggage trolley as he walks through a hotel (actually Brisbane City Hall) singing. As he walks through, he passes the other members of Powderfinger. He eventually walks out of the hotel and finds himself on a country road which was filmed halfway between Toowoomba and Dalby. In this scene a large chandelier can be seen, continuing the theme from the cover art of the single. There are also a few shots of the band playing the song as a group intercut with the "dramatic" scenes.

== Release ==
Having reunited after a two and a half-year hiatus, new releases from Powderfinger was highly anticipated. The group announced their intention to release the single in April 2007 in a blog on their MySpace. Following this, the single was released to radio on 13 April and on the band's MySpace music player on 16 April. The CD single was then released on 12 May 2007. In its week of release, the single reached its peak position of No. 5 on Australia's ARIA Singles Chart. It also became one of the most popular songs on Australian radio.

In support of its release as a single, the music video for "Lost and Running" was included on a special edition DVD of its album Dream Days at the Hotel Existence and was the twelfth track on the DVD, dubbed the "Twelfth Man", a cricketing term. All other tracks on the DVD were music videos from throughout the band's career.

The song was performed on television on Australian variety show Rove on 17 June 2007. Powderfinger also performed the song with the Sydney Gospel Choir on 28 October 2007 at the ARIA Music Awards of 2007, as it was nominated for Single of the Year.

== Reception ==
"Lost and Running" was earned a mixed response from reviewers. Kathy McCabe of The Daily Telegraph noted that it's "an instant singalong anthem which should prove a crowd favourite". McCabe also comments on the band's application of their influences stating that they have "taken a vial of sonic essence from their favourite artists and skilfully distilled the parts into a Powderfinger whole." The song was rated 3.5 stars out of 5.

Meanwhile, Matthias Scherer of NoiseMakesEnemies.co.uk described the song as boring and inoffensive, questioning "Who knew the music scene down under was in this serious a state."

Sputnikmusic contributor James Bishop stated that the song was an example of Powderfinger trading the "youthful" songs of their past albums for "more mature, earthly cuts". He also noted the Rolling Stones influence, and said the song contained a "laidback approach and simple acoustic charm". Bishop noted that the song divided many long-time fans, who in his opinion "mostly didn’t get it", and summarised by calling the song catchy.

== Awards and nominations ==
"Lost and Running" was nominated for two ARIA Music Awards in 2007; Single of the Year and Best Video, however both awards were won by Silverchair for their song "Straight Lines". "Lost and Running" was the 27th most played song on Australian radio in 2007, and reached No. 15 on the Triple J Hottest 100, 2007.

Awards and nominations for "Lost and Running"
Ceremony	Award	Result
ARIA Music Awards of 2007	Single of the Year	Nominated
ARIA Music Awards of 2007	Best Video	Nominated

== Track listing ==
Australian CD single
No.	Title	Length
1.	"Lost and Running"	3:44
2.	"Down by the Dam"	4:29
3.	"The Devil is in the Detail"	2:46

== Personnel ==
Powderfinger

- Bernard Fanning – vocals, acoustic guitar
- John Collins – bass guitar
- Ian Haug – electric guitar
- Darren Middleton – electric guitar, slide guitar
- Jon Coghill – drums

Additional musicians

- Benmont Tench – piano, keyboards

Production

- Rob Schnapf – Producer
- Doug Boehm – Engineer

== Charts ==
"Lost and Running" is Powderfinger's second highest-charting single, second only to their 2000 release "My Happiness", which gained international attention. "Lost and Running" reached its peak position of No. 5 on the ARIA Singles Chart on 27 May 2007, its week of release, however failed to chart internationally. It remained in the charts for thirteen consecutive weeks, but re-entered the charts at No. 46 on 11 November following the group performing the song at the 2007 ARIA Music Awards. The song failed to chart in New Zealand.

=== Weekly charts ===
Weekly chart performance for "Lost and Running"
Chart (2007)	Peak position
Australia (ARIA)	5

=== Year-end charts ===
Year-end chart performance for "Lost and Running"
Chart (2007)	Position
Australia (ARIA)	56
