= Ian Haug =

Australian musician (born 1970)

Ian David Haug
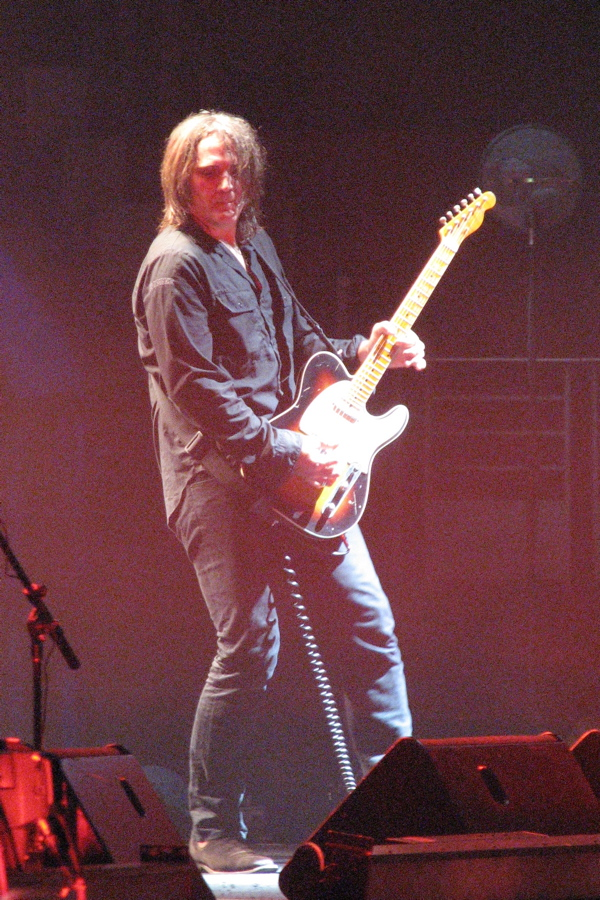
- Haug at the Across the Great Divide Tour in Sydney, 2007

Background information
- Born: 21 February 1970 (age 56); Hobart, Tasmania, Australia
- Origin: Brisbane, Queensland, Australia
- Genres: Indie rock, alternative rock
- Occupation: Musician
- Instruments: Guitar, vocals
- Years active: 1989–present
- Labels: Polydor, Universal

Ian Haug (born 21 February 1970) is an Australian musician and the lead guitarist, songwriter, and backing vocalist in the rock band Powderfinger from its formation in 1989 until its breakup in 2010. He is presently a member of The Church.

== Powderfinger ==
Powderfinger was formed in 1989 by vocalist and guitarist Ian Haug, bass guitarist John Collins and drummer Steven Bishop, who took their band's name from the Neil Young song "Powderfinger". Before the band's formation, Haug had played in other Brisbane-based outfits. The band later sought an extra guitarist, Bernard Fanning, who Haug had met in a university class. Fanning took over the role of lead vocals from Haug, and at the same time Jon Coghill joined, replacing Bishop. Powderfinger's final line-up change came with the addition of guitarist Darren Middleton. The line-up of Coghill, Collins, Fanning, Haug and Middleton remained unchanged from 1992 onwards.

== Far Out Corporation ==
Haug and Grant McLennan formed the Far Out Corporation in 1996 and made one record - and performed a handful of shows to critical acclaim. During a hiatus (2004–2006) in Powderfinger's career, Haug worked on a side project, The Predators, with Collins and original Powderfinger member Steven Bishop on drums and vocals. During all live Predators shows Ross McLennan played drums while Steven Bishop stepped to the front of the stage. In April 2010, Powderfinger announced it would disband after their final tour in September–October.

== The Predators ==
In 2004, Powderfinger decided to take some time off to allow the band members to begin families and pursue side projects. In this downtime Haug formed The Predators with the original Powderfinger lineup of drummer/vocalist Steven Bishop and bassist John Collins. The band, like the other side projects for Powderfinger, was signed to the Dew Process record label. The Predators released a six track EP in 2006 and were joined live by drummer Ross McLennan.

In 2007, Haug reunited with Powderfinger to release their sixth studio album Dream Days at the Hotel Existence. They followed with their seventh studio album, Golden Rule in 2009. In April 2010, Powderfinger announced it would disband after their final tour in September–October.

== The Church ==
In 2013, following the departure of guitarist Marty Willson-Piper, Haug joined Australian band The Church and during the early parts of 2014 they recorded an album, Further/Deeper, which was released in October 2014 and toured Australia in the latter part of that year. Haug then toured with the band in the United States in 2015 and 2016.

Haug is now a full member of The Church. He wrote and recorded with the band on the next album Man Woman Life Death Infinity, and toured with them for that album as well as the Starfish 30th Anniversary Tour. He would later appear on their subsequent albums, The Hypnogogue and Eros Zeta and the Perfumed Guitars.

== Awards and nominations ==
=== APRA Awards ===
The APRA Awards are presented annually from 1982 by the Australasian Performing Right Association (APRA).

Year	Nominee / work	Award	Result
2004	Powderfinger – Bernard Fanning, Jon Coghill, Haug, Darren Middleton, John Collins	Songwriter of the Year	Won
2004	"On My Mind" – Bernard Fanning, Darren Middleton, John Collins, Haug, Jon Coghill	Most Performed Australian Work	Nominated
2008	"Lost and Running" – Jon Coghill, John Collins, Bernard Fanning, Haug, Darren Middleton	Song of the Year	Nominated
2008	"Lost and Running" – Jon Coghill, John Collins, Bernard Fanning, Haug, Darren Middleton	Most Played Australian Work	Nominated
