= Jon Coghill =

Australian drummer (born 1971)

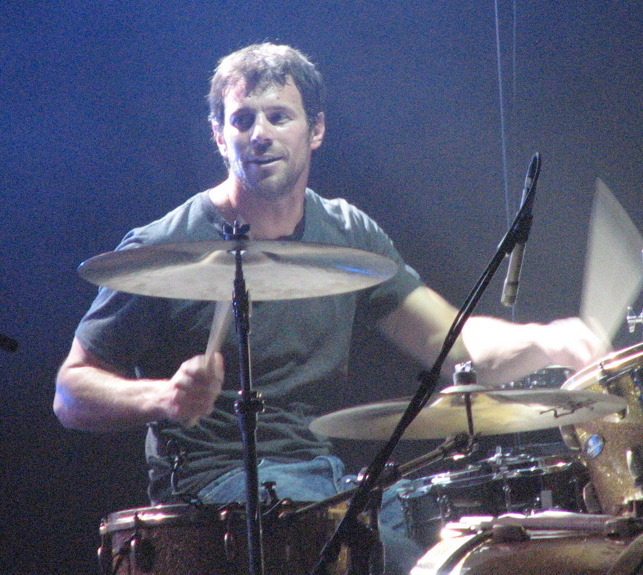
- Coghill performing with Powderfinger in 2007

Background information
- Born: 26 August 1971 (age 55); Nambour, Queensland, Australia
- Genres: Alternative rock
- Instruments: Drums, percussion
- Years active: 1989–present
- Labels: Polydor, Universal

Jon Coghill (born 26 August 1971) is an Australian drummer best known for his work with the rock band Powderfinger, although he has also toured with Regurgitator. Coghill replaced Powderfinger's original drummer, Steven Bishop, in 1991. At this time, Powderfinger had not made any recordings, and as such, Coghill has been the group's drummer for all of their releases.

== Biography ==
Coghill attended Nambour State High School in Nambour, Queensland where his father was a Physics teacher, graduating in 1988. While in high school, Coghill's ambitions were not directed towards music, as he expressed an interest in football or surfing. Upon graduating, he moved to Queensland's state capital Brisbane and began studying Botany at the University of Queensland, however was interested in the Brisbane local music scene. Before long, Coghill had begun playing drums for local bands including side project Shock Fungus.

Coghill met Powderfinger when he attended one of their practice sessions and joked with the band, introducing himself as a drummer. Two years later, when Steven Bishop left the band, guitarist Ian Haug recognised Coghill at an audition, and signed him at that point. Previously, Coghill had been rejected in an audition for Custard. Jon spent about six months playing alongside Scott Coleman and Marc Zande in the Brisbane grunge band, Gland, before committing full-time to Powderfinger in early 1992. In December 1997, Coghill took a brief break from Powderfinger and toured with Regurgitator. Drummer Ross McLennan of Far Out Corporation and later from The Predators, took Coghill's place for a Powderfinger performance on 19 December.

Through his time in the band, Coghill has endeavoured to improve his drumming. In 1999 following the release of the band's third album Internationalist, he took up lessons with Brisbane-based drum tutor Col Gillies. Coghill has stated that he took the lessons due to being "really sore" "three quarters the way through a show".

In 2004, Coghill was named Best Drummer by Jack Daniels for their inaugural Jack Awards. To commemorate this, he joined with several other Australian musicians to form the one-shot band Superfinger Sleepychair. Composed of members of The Superjesus, Silverchair and Sleepy Jackson, along with Coghill from Powderfinger, the group's name is a portmanteau of all of the members' band's names.

Coghill has been described by Powderfinger lead singer Bernard Fanning as "psycho", stating "There's a constant battle between Cogsy and I as to who's the biggest psycho in the band" on numerous occasions. Fanning has also said of Coghill "He likes to antagonise people, and I don't mean that in a mean way", and continued to say jokingly that "It makes me want to smash him sometimes." Guitarist Darren Middleton says of Coghill "Jon likes movies with explosions in them", and has also described him as stubborn. Fellow guitarist Ian Haug says Coghill is an excellent arranger, explaining "he can listen to it all, just sort of sit back and go, 'Okay, that's a really good bit.'" Coghill himself has described himself as a "superhero". He has also stated that he shares the band's hatred of band photos. Coghill says he shares the stereotype of drummers being the most "out there" member of the band. He says this is true because "We have so much energy...We’re stuck up the back and we’re more likely to do stupid shit to get rid of it." In 2008, Coghill studied a mixture of politics and law at Griffith University. He was a journalist for the Australian Broadcasting Corporation 2014 - 2018 .

== Style, technique, and influences ==
One of the best things about being in the band is that we don't give a fuck about anything else other than having a good time, if people think we're rockstars then so be it, fucking great. Don't analyse things too much – it's not that serious, it's just fucking music.

— Jon Coghill

Coghill took up drumming in high school, because "one of the coolest guy[s]" also played the drums. He says he never enjoyed reading about drumming, but preferred to talk to drummers. He has also stated that he doesn't listen to "drummer music", but prefers listening to music as a whole.

Coghill cites drummers Keith Moon and Mitch Mitchell as major influences on his playing, while boxer Mohammad Ali as a non-musical inspiration. He notes that multi-instrumentalist Stevie Wonder is his favourite. During his university years, Coghill began listening to technical drummers such as Dennis Chambers. Others have noted that Coghill is influenced by The Dead Kennedys and The Fugees. In 1997, Coghill stated "I’m really interested in groove", and explained that he enjoyed the lyrical elements of Hip Hop and bands such as Spearhead. Coghill has also stated that as a child growing up in Nambour, he had aspired to be "a star like Michael Jackson". He says this ambition was sparked by a breakdancing teacher in his home town, and by his sister's love of Jackson's Thriller.

== Equipment ==
Coghill received his first drum at the age of 14, which was a Pearl drum kit given to him by his parents. In 1999, Coghill noted that he began using a 1970 Slingerland drum kit, citing that it had a better sound than a new kit, and was cheaper. Coghill uses Avedis Zildjian cymbals. He says that he has been offered sponsorship, but opted for older drums as a matter of preference. Despite this assertion, as of 2007 Coghill's name is mentioned in the Brady Drums artist roster.

== Awards and nominations ==
=== APRA Awards ===
The APRA Awards are presented annually from 1982 by the Australasian Performing Right Association (APRA).

Year	Nominee / work	Award	Result
2004	Powderfinger – Bernard Fanning, Coghill, Ian Haug, Darren Middleton, John Collins	Songwriter of the Year	Won
2004	"On My Mind" – Bernard Fanning, Darren Middleton, John Collins, Ian Haug, Coghill	Most Performed Australian Work	Nominated
2008	"Lost and Running" – Coghill, John Collins, Bernard Fanning, Ian Haug, Darren Middleton	Song of the Year	Nominated
2008	"Lost and Running" – Coghill, John Collins, Bernard Fanning, Ian Haug, Darren Middleton	Most Played Australian Work	Nominated

== Discography ==
- Parables for Wooden Ears (1994)
- Double Allergic (1996)
- Internationalist (1998)
- Odyssey Number Five (2000)
- Vulture Street (2003)
- Dream Days at the Hotel Existence (2007)
- Golden Rule (2009)
