= Darren Middleton =

Australian musician (born 1971)

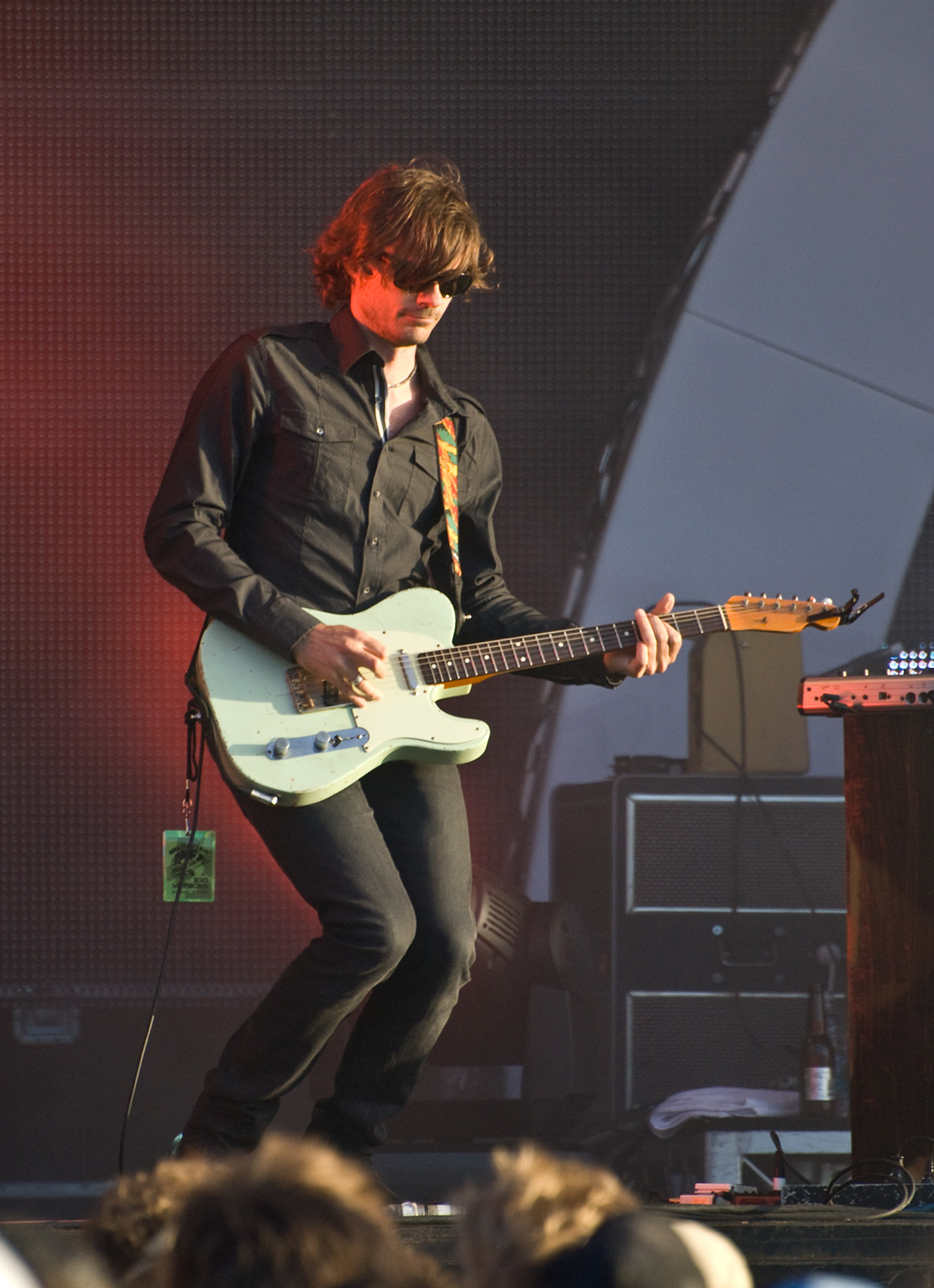
- Middleton on guitar with Powderfinger in January 2010 at Big Day Out, Melbourne

Background information
- Born: 4 October 1971 (age 54); Brisbane, Queensland, Australia
- Genres: Alternative rock, indie rock
- Occupation: Musician
- Instruments: Guitar; keyboards
- Years active: 1989–present
- Labels: Polydor, Universal

Darren Middleton (born 4 October 1971) is an Australian musician, best known as lead guitarist and songwriter for alternative rock band Powderfinger. He was also lead singer/songwriter for Drag.

After Powderfinger's dissolution in 2010, Middleton released his first solo LP, Translations in November 2013, featuring guests such as Nic Cester (Jet), Bernard Fanning (Powderfinger), Pete Murray, Paul Dempsey (Something for Kate), Clare Bowditch and Amy Findlay (Stonefield). His following album, Splinters, was released in 2015.

Middleton attended prestigious private school, Brisbane Boys' College, where he started guitar in high school. He was influenced by Twisted Sister and AC/DC, and began playing in clubs around his hometown of Brisbane as part of his first band, Sonic Tapestry. He went on to form another band, Pirate, with high school friends, and met Powderfinger at a Pirate show. After graduating from Brisbane Boys' College, Middleton was invited to join Powderfinger, and consequently took part in all of Powderfinger's recordings, at the same time writing and releasing an EP and studio album with Drag.

== Musical career ==
=== Early work ===
Middleton was inspired to learn guitar by Twisted Sister and AC/DC, noting the first songs he wanted to learn could have been "I Wanna Rock" and "We're Not Gonna Take It", or any song by AC/DC. He did not take guitar lessons, and instead taught himself the instrument. Middleton formed a band named Sonic Tapestry with high school friends, and played around Brisbane's "biker-fest circuit". The band's first show was at the Atcherley Hotel, on Wednesday's "Heavy Metal Night", however the band, unaware of the genre, played "80s glam metal stuff".

=== Powderfinger (1989–2010) ===
Middleton first encountered Powderfinger when it consisted of Bernard Fanning, Ian Haug, John Collins, and Jon Coghill. At the time, Middleton had been playing with Sonic Tapestry, and another band named Pirate. After seeing his band perform, Powderfinger invited Middleton to join them, and he accepted. Middleton described Powderfinger's early days as highly influenced by other popular heavy metal bands at the time, especially Pantera. Despite the band's members all having come from casual projects, the band's meetings were highly serious, according to Middleton, although he admitted they were "confused" in exactly what they wanted to do. Powderfinger generally performed covers of The Rolling Stones, The Doors, Led Zeppelin, and Steppenwolf, as well as Neil Young in their early days, in similar clubs to those in which Middleton had first played.

Powderfinger released two early EPs and a debut album, without success, and considered separating, with Middleton contemplating a return to University. However, after Fanning wrote "Pick You Up", the band's mainstream breakthrough, they decided to stick together. From this point on, the band considered themselves to be making "real money".

In 2001, on a tour in the United States, Powderfinger played with Coldplay, in what Middleton described as a highlight. The band also played on the Late Show with David Letterman to promote Odyssey Number Five. After Coldplay cut short the tour, Powderfinger ended up playing numerous US shows themselves, before returning to Australia to play Splendour in the Grass. Middleton's partner gave birth to the couple's first daughter in September 2001. Middleton summarised the year with the comment "This year has been a bit of a blur".

=== Drag (2000–2006) ===
While touring with Powderfinger, Middleton also wrote his own works, occasionally fine tuning them in hotels where the band was staying. These would go on to be the songs he sang for Drag. Middleton formed Drag with drummer and Powderfinger engineer Mark McElligott, Brisbane bass guitarist Sean Hartman, and long-time friend Matt Murphy. Drag released an EP, Gas Food Lodging, on 26 October 2003 through Dew Process. The band followed this up with several gigs in Brisbane; a tour down the East Coast of Australia was cancelled when Middleton caught the flu. After completing work on Gas Food Lodging, Powderfinger reunited and went on to record Vulture Street.

Drag reunited in 2005 to produce their debut studio album, The Way Out, which was released on 10 July 2005. In recording the album, Drag spent three weeks at Byron Bay in March 2005, collaborating with each other and producer David Nicholas. The album earned Drag some positive reception; Rave magazine wrote that "Darren Middleton's creative genius absolutely beguiled me with some extremely mature compositions", and David Nicholas won an ARIA Award for his role as producer. The album was also nominated for "Engineer of the Year". Following The Way Out, Drag toured around Australia, playing with UK band Athlete. This culminated with the bands playing at Splendour in the Grass, where it was noted that Middleton needed "to work on his stage presence". Following the tour, Powderfinger reunited, and Dream Days at the Hotel Existence was released in 2007.

=== Solo work (2012–present) ===
After Powderfinger disbanded in 2010, Middleton started working on his first solo LP, Translations. The album was released in November 2013, featuring guests such as Nic Cester (Jet), Bernard Fanning (Powderfinger), Pete Murray, Paul Dempsey (Something for Kate), Clare Bowditch and Amy Findlay (Stonefield). 2016 saw Darren Middleton return to touring, as he embarked on a four-show tour of Western Australia (three shows) and Victoria (one show) in August and November. The tour was for solo project Splinters.

== Musical style and influences ==
We really love what we're doing. We still love playing music together. I think there's a whole philosophy with our band. When you know there are a couple thousand people who paid money and just want to have a good night out, and if you think about that for a minute before the show, you get really fired up. It's quite a nice job we have, and a great lifestyle.

— Darren Middleton
When asked what inspires the band before live performances.

Middleton rarely takes a singer or songwriter's role for Powderfinger, generally delegating those tasks to Bernard Fanning. However, the song "Over My Head" from Internationalist had Middleton performing vocals. This came about when Middleton did a recording of himself singing the song before Fanning had the chance to do so. Previously, Middleton had written the lyrics to "JC", which was sung by Fanning. However, Middleton sung JC several times throughout the 2007 Upstairs at the Downstairs tour. Despite Middleton's minimal songwriting, he has been praised for it by his bandmates; Jon Coghill told a 1999 interview that "Darren (Middleton) and Bernie (Fanning) are extremely good at writing songs." Middleton agrees with this analysis; telling Undercover's Paul Cashmere in 2003 that "We are about writing good music." He commented that the band used their position at the top of the Australian industry to comment and give people ideas to think about, rather than "trying to say people should take it as gospel". Middleton has criticised the "boy band" phenomena, pointing out that "A lot of them can sing well, but they have people writing all their lyrics for them."

Middleton has cited numerous Australian bands, including AC/DC, Crowded House, and Midnight Oil, as ongoing influences in his music, as well as international artists including Neil Young, Led Zeppelin, and Ben Harper. "I went through a bad eighties stage. Bad glam bands. Twisted Sister. Some really bad punk", Middleton comments on the time in which he learned the guitar. Middleton has used a Les Paul guitar, and was praised by Alphonse Leong of Drop-D, described as playing it "as well as any of the seminal axe-noodlers of the hippie era".

== Awards and nominations ==
=== APRA Awards ===
The APRA Awards are presented annually from 1982 by the Australasian Performing Right Association (APRA).

Year	Nominee / work	Award	Result
2004	Powderfinger – Bernard Fanning, Jon Coghill, Ian Haug, Middleton, John Collins	Songwriter of the Year	Won
2004	"On My Mind" – Bernard Fanning, Middleton, John Collins, Ian Haug, Jon Coghill	Most Performed Australian Work	Nominated
2008	"Lost and Running" – Jon Coghill, John Collins, Bernard Fanning, Ian Haug, Middleton	Song of the Year	Nominated
2008	"Lost and Running" – Jon Coghill, John Collins, Bernard Fanning, Ian Haug, Middleton	Most Played Australian Work	Nominated

== Discography ==
=== With Powderfinger ===
- Parables for Wooden Ears (1994)
- Double Allergic (1996)
- Internationalist (1998)
- Odyssey Number Five (2000)
- Vulture Street (2003)
- Dream Days at the Hotel Existence (2007)
- Golden Rule (2009)

=== With Drag ===
- Gas Food Lodging (EP) (2002)
- The Way Out (2005)

=== Solo ===
- Translations (2013)
- Splinters (2015)
- Tides (2018)

== Influence ==
Middleton attended Brisbane Boys College in Brisbane, Queensland. The School established an annual songwriting competition in 2017, which was named for him in 2018.
