= Across the Great Divide tour =

2007 concert tour by Powderfinger and Silverchair

- Tour by Powderfinger and Silverchair
- Location: Australia; New Zealand
- Associated album: Dream Days at the Hotel Existence (Powderfinger); Young Modern (Silverchair)
- Start date: 29 August 2007
- End date: 26 October 2007
- Legs: 1
- No. of shows: 25 in Australia; 4 in New Zealand; 29 in total

The Across the Great Divide tour was a concert tour by Australian alternative rock bands Powderfinger and Silverchair in 2007. The tour featured concerts in 26 towns across Australia and multiple shows in New Zealand. According to Powderfinger frontman Bernard Fanning, the aim of the tour was to "show [that] both bands are behind the idea of reconciliation". Both bands aimed to increase awareness of the efforts of Reconciliation Australia to reduce the current 17-year gap in life expectancy between the average Australian life and that of Indigenous Australians. A triple DVD set was released with the same title as the tour on 1 December 2007 with the Melbourne performances for both bands and backstage occurrences from the tour.

== Background ==
Prior to the tour, Powderfinger and Silverchair performed numerous MySpace-exclusive concerts, with only 200 tickets made available. The majority of tickets were sold within 30 minutes.

Unlike many conventional tours, the Across the Great Divide tour entered many regional centres across the country, which was supported by the districts the bands went into, being regarded by some as "phenomenal". At nine weeks long, the tour was the longest yet for both bands. The tour began in Silverchair's home town of Newcastle, and then moved directly north to Powderfinger's home city Brisbane, before continuing to other parts of Australia.

Tickets went on sale on 9 July and the shows in Brisbane, Melbourne, Sydney, Adelaide and Wollongong all sold out within half an hour. The Gold Coast and Newcastle shows sold out by mid-morning, and Perth also sold out within hours. Extra shows were announced in Brisbane, Melbourne, Sydney, Adelaide, Wollongong, Newcastle and Perth to meet the high demand.

"Jake"
A 20 second sample from Powderfinger and Silverchair's joint effort "Jake", in which the band members can be heard laughing in the background.

Powderfinger and Silverchair appeared onstage together for the first time in the tour on 8 September, in Sydney, performing a cover of The Who's "Substitute" to close the show. Fanning said of the performance, "This is the very first time we've done this", and it was reported that he and Johns showed a mutual affection and respect for each other and their bands. Together, the band wrote the song "Jake", which they recorded and released as a free 39 second ringtone on the tour's website.

On 9 September, while performing at Sydney's Acer Arena, Fanning made news for attacking the 2007 APEC Australia Summit in Sydney. In a pause between songs, Fanning described the participants in the summit as "fuckwits".

The Ballarat show originally scheduled for 16 September, was postponed due to a fifteen-metre tear in the performance tent, which is being used in regional areas as the concert arena, where large enough venues are not available. The concert instead went ahead the next night.

== Show format ==
As the show entered many rural and regional centres, many locations did not have arenas or stages available, and for these locations, a tent was constructed in which the bands would perform for their audiences. An illustration of this tent was shown at the bottom of the promotional posters and the cover of the DVD of the tour.

The performances schedule consisted of three main parts, beginning with the supporting artist performing one set, followed by Silverchair and then Powderfinger would play the final set of the night. The two bands united for only three performances onstage at the one time throughout the tour. The supporting artists varied from location to location. These artists included Epicure, Dan Kelly, Expatriate, Youth Group, The Scare, Nabarlek, Blue King Brown, The Beautiful Girls, Something With Numbers, Kev Carmody, Kisschasy, Andrew Morris, Wire MC and Street Warriors.

== Response ==
The response to the Across the Great Divide tour was highly positive, both musically and for the purpose that it was held. Following the tour's second concert at Brisbane Entertainment Centre, Rave Magazine reviewer Simon Topper comments Silverchair as "Visually stunning, and giving goosebumps during 'The Greatest View' and 'Straight Lines', Silverchair still elicit the screaming throng mentality, although it's not until final blast 'Freak' that anything resembling a mosh starts." Topper's comments of Powderfinger are equally positive, though defines them differently as "still just a bunch of blokes who could just as easily play a beer garden, but happen to have written some of this generation's anthems." Law enforcement representatives praised the tour's low rate of incidents, some attributing the success to the maturity of the crowds, with Wodonga police officials commenting that less than 1,000 of the 8,000 people in attendance at the Wodonga show were under the age of 18 and that the average age of attendance was "about 30 [years old]".

== Tour itinerary ==
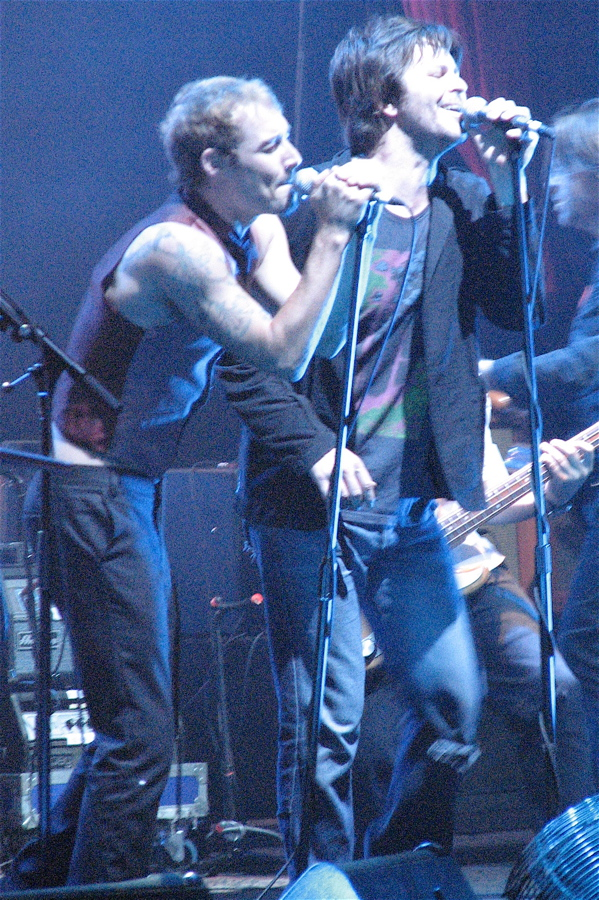
Daniel Johns and Bernard Fanning at the tour in Sydney.

Tour venues
| Date | City | Country | Venue |
|---|---|---|---|
| 29 August 2007 | Newcastle | Australia | Newcastle Entertainment Centre |
| 31 August 2007 | Brisbane | Australia | Brisbane Entertainment Centre |
| 1 September 2007 | Brisbane | Australia | Brisbane Entertainment Centre |
| 2 September 2007 | Gold Coast | Australia | Gold Coast Convention and Exhibition Centre |
| 4 September 2007 | Tamworth | Australia | Tamworth Regional Entertainment Centre |
| 6 September 2007 | Coffs Harbour | Australia | Coffs Harbour Showgrounds |
| 8 September 2007 | Sydney | Australia | Acer Arena, Homebush |
| 9 September 2007 | Sydney | Australia | Acer Arena, Homebush |
| 11 September 2007 | Canberra | Australia | John Dunmore Lang Place |
| 12 September 2007 | Wodonga | Australia | Gateway Island, Lincoln Causeway |
| 14 September 2007 | Mildura | Australia | Ornamental Gardens |
| 15 September 2007 | Bendigo | Australia | Bendigo Showgrounds |
| 16 September 2007 | Ballarat | Australia | Ballarat Showgrounds (postponed) |
| 18 September 2007 | Melbourne | Australia | Rod Laver Arena |
| 19 September 2007 | Melbourne | Australia | Rod Laver Arena |
| 22 September 2007 | Perth | Australia | Claremont Oval |
| 23 September 2007 | Perth | Australia | Claremont Oval |
| 26 September 2007 | Adelaide | Australia | Adelaide Entertainment Centre |
| 29 September 2007 | Hobart | Australia | Derwent Entertainment Centre |
| 5 October 2007 | Darwin | Australia | Darwin Showgrounds |
| 7 October 2007 | Cairns | Australia | Cairns Showgrounds |
| 8 October 2007 | Townsville | Australia | Townsville Entertainment Centre |
| 9 October 2007 | Townsville | Australia | Townsville Entertainment Centre |
| 11 October 2007 | Mackay | Australia | Mackay Showgrounds |
| 12 October 2007 | Rockhampton | Australia | Rockhampton Music Bowl |
| 14 October 2007 | Toowoomba | Australia | University of Southern Queensland Oval |
| 16 October 2007 | Christchurch | New Zealand | Westpac Arena |
| 18 October 2007 | Wellington | New Zealand | TSB Bank Arena |
| 19 October 2007 | Palmerston North | New Zealand | Arena Manawatu |
| 20 October 2007 | Auckland | New Zealand | Vector Arena |
| 23 October 2007 | Wollongong | Australia | WIN Entertainment Centre |
| 24 October 2007 | Wollongong | Australia | WIN Entertainment Centre |
| 26 October 2007 | Newcastle | Australia | Newcastle Entertainment Centre |
