= John Collins (Australian musician) =

Australian bass guitarist (born 1970)

John Collins AM
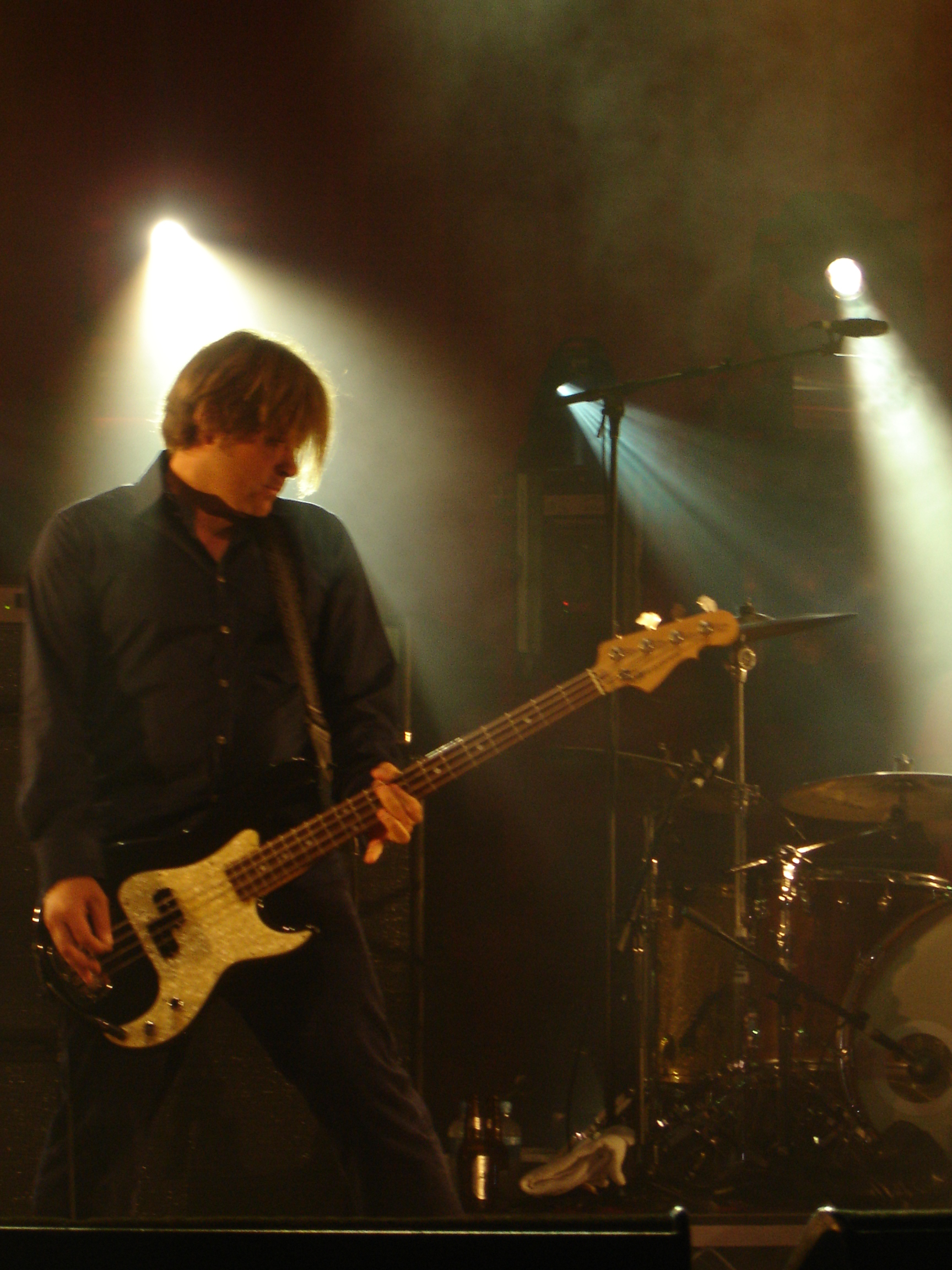

Background information
- Also known as: JC
- Born: John Andrew Collins; 27 April 1970 (age 56); Australia
- Genres: Rock, alternative rock
- Instrument: Bass guitar
- Years active: 1989–present
- Labels: Polydor, Universal

John Andrew Collins AM (born 27 April 1970) is the bass guitarist for Australian rock band Powderfinger. He is one of the founding members of the band along with guitarist Ian Haug, who formed it at their high school, Brisbane Grammar School, as a three-piece. Powderfinger has released seven studio albums, a greatest-hits album, and a double CD live album. After they released their first best-of album, Fingerprints, in 2004, they decided to take a break. During the hiatus, Collins played with fellow Powderfinger member Darren Middleton in his new band Drag on a number of occasions as well as performing with Ian Haug and Steven Bishop in The Predators. Collins is often referred to as "J.C." by his fellow band members, as they are his initials and to distinguish him from the group's drummer Jon Coghill. Initially, the nickname was given to him following the group's song "JC" from their second album, Double Allergic, which referred to Jesus Christ.

== Appointment to Queensland Night-Life Economy Commissioner ==
Collins was appointed as the first Night-Life Economy Commissioner in Queensland, Australia on the 30th of September, 2024, following the creation of the role by legislation earlier that year. The primary function of his role is supporting the economic development and preservation of the nightlife sector, serving as a central point of contact and advocating for live music venues, nightclubs, festival organisers, bars and restaurants, entertainment precincts, arts outlets, and local pubs to boost the economic impact of the sector and ensure long term sustainability.

== Awards and nominations ==
Collins was appointed a Member of the Order of Australia in the 2024 King's Birthday Honours for "significant service to the arts through music, and to the community".

=== APRA Awards ===
The APRA Awards are presented annually from 1982 by the Australasian Performing Right Association (APRA).

Year	Nominee / work	Award	Result
2004	Powderfinger – Bernard Fanning, Jon Coghill, Ian Haug, Darren Middleton, John Collins	Songwriter of the Year	Won
2004	"On My Mind" – Bernard Fanning, Darren Middleton, Collins, Ian Haug, Jon Coghill	Most Performed Australian Work	Nominated
2008	"Lost and Running" – Jon Coghill, Collins, Bernard Fanning, Ian Haug, Darren Middleton	Song of the Year	Nominated
2008	"Lost and Running" – Jon Coghill, Collins, Bernard Fanning, Ian Haug, Darren Middleton	Most Played Australian Work	Nominated
