= List of awards and nominations received by Powderfinger =

List of Powderfinger awards and nominations
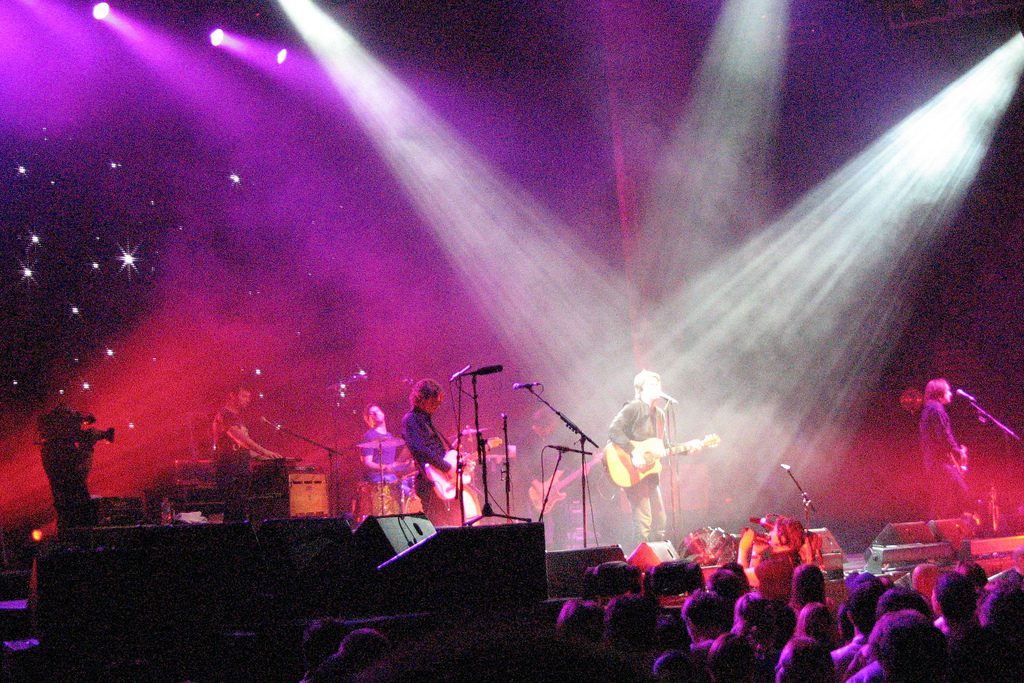
- Powderfinger performing at the Across the Great Divide Tour with Silverchair in September 2007.
Awards and nominations
Award	Wins	Nominations
APRA	3	6
ARIA	18	47
Hottest 100 (Note: Powderfinger tracks have been ranked as #1 on Triple J Hottest 100 charts twice, and have been ranked in other positions 21 times.)	2	21
Jack Awards	4	4

Totals (Note: Certain award groups do not simply award one winner. They acknowledge several different recipients, have runners-up, and have third place. Since this is a specific recognition and is different from losing an award, runner-up mentions are considered wins in this award tally. For simplification and to avoid errors, each award in this list has been presumed to have had a prior nomination.)
- Wins: 28
- Nominations: 50

This is a comprehensive listing of awards won by Powderfinger, an alternative rock band who were based in Brisbane, Australia. The band formed in 1989 in Brisbane, and their lineup since 1992 consisted of Bernard Fanning, John Collins, Ian Haug, Darren Middleton and Jon Coghill.

Powderfinger is highly successful in the Australian recording industry, being a recipient of the industry's flagship awards, the Australian Recording Industry Association Music Awards, eighteen times. The group has also topped the Triple J Hottest 100 chart twice, and had a total of 21 entries listed. The group has also received three awards from the Australasian Performing Right Association, four Jack Awards, and four Music Industry Critics' Awards.

== ARIA Awards ==
Powderfinger has won eighteen ARIA Awards from the Australian Recording Industry Association, from forty-seven nominations, over a period of sixteen years. In particular, Powderfinger has received the "Best Cover Art" award several times, including for Odyssey Number Five in 2001, and for Vulture Street in 2003. Powderfinger has also won the award for "Best Group" twice, and has been nominated six times. The awards are presented annually by the Australian Recording Industry Association.

Year	Nominated work	Award	Result
1996	"Pick You Up"	Engineer of the Year	Nominated
1996	"Pick You Up"	Song of the Year	Nominated
1996	"Pick You Up"	Single of the Year	Nominated
1997	Double Allergic	Producer of the Year	Nominated
1997	Double Allergic	Best Alternative Release	Nominated
1997	Double Allergic	Best Group	Nominated
1997	Double Allergic	Highest Selling Album	Nominated
1997	Double Allergic	Album of the Year	Nominated
1997	"D.A.F."	Song of the Year	Nominated
1997	"D.A.F."	Single of the Year	Nominated
1999	Internationalist	Best Cover Art	Won
1999	Internationalist	Best Rock Album	Won
1999	Internationalist	Album of the Year	Won
1999	Internationalist	Best Group	Nominated
1999	"The Day You Come"	Single of the Year	Won
2000	"Passenger"	Best Cover Art	Nominated
2000	"Passenger"	Best Group	Nominated
2000	"Passenger"	Single of the Year	Nominated
2001	Odyssey Number Five	Best Cover Art	Won
2001	Odyssey Number Five	Best Rock Album	Won
2001	Odyssey Number Five	Highest Selling Album	Won
2001	Odyssey Number Five	Best Group	Won
2001	Odyssey Number Five	Album of the Year	Won
2001	"My Happiness"	Single of the Year	Won
2001	"My Happiness"	Highest Selling Single	Nominated
2001	"Like a Dog"	Best Video	Nominated
2002	"The Metre"	Best Group	Nominated
2003	Vulture Street	Best Cover Art	Won
2003	Vulture Street	Best Rock Album	Won
2003	Vulture Street	Best Group	Won
2003	Vulture Street	Album of the Year	Won
2003	Vulture Street	Highest Selling Album	Nominated
2003	"(Baby I've Got You) On My Mind"	Best Video	Nominated
2003	"(Baby I've Got You) On My Mind"	Single of the Year	Nominated
2004	"Sunsets"	Best Group	Nominated
2005	These Days: Live in Concert	Best Music DVD	Nominated
2005	These Days: Live in Concert	Best Group	Nominated
2007	Dream Days at the Hotel Existence	Best Cover Art	Won
2007	Dream Days at the Hotel Existence	Best Rock Album	Nominated
2007	Dream Days at the Hotel Existence	Best Group	Nominated
2007	Dream Days at the Hotel Existence	Album of the Year	Nominated
2007	"Lost and Running"	Single of the Year	Nominated
2007	"Lost and Running"	Best Video	Nominated
2008	Across the Great Divide (with Silverchair)	Best Music DVD	Won
2010	Golden Rule	Best Group	Nominated
2010	Golden Rule	Best Rock Album	Nominated
2010	Golden Rule	Most Popular Australian Album	Won
2010	Powderfinger	Most Popular Australian Artist	Won
2010	"All of the Dreamers" – Head Pictures	Best Video	Nominated
2011	Sunsets Farewell Tour	Best Music DVD	Nominated

== APRA Awards ==
Powderfinger has won multiple APRA Awards from the Australasian Performing Right Association, including "Songwriter of the Year" in 2004. The band has also won "Song of the Year" twice, in 2000 and 2001.

Year	Nominated work	Award	Result
1996	"Pick You Up"	Song of the Year	Nominated
1999	"The Day You Come"	Song of the Year	Nominated
2000	"Passenger"	Song of the Year	Won
2001	"My Happiness"	Song of the Year	Won
2004	Powderfinger	Songwriter of the Year	Won
2004	"On My Mind"	Most Performed Australian Work	Nominated
2010	"Burn Your Name" (Jonathan Coghill, John Collins, Bernard Fanning, Ian Haug, Darren Middleton)	Song of the Year	Shortlisted
2010	"All of the Dreamers" (Jonathan Coghill, John Collins, Bernard Fanning, Ian Haug, Darren Middleton)	Song of the Year	Shortlisted
2011	"Burn Your Name" (Jonathan Coghill, John Collins, Bernard Fanning, Ian Haug, Darren Middleton)	Most Played Australian Work	Nominated
2011	"Burn Your Name" (Jonathan Coghill, John Collins, Bernard Fanning, Ian Haug, Darren Middleton)	Rock Work of the Year	Nominated

== Helpmann Awards ==
The Helpmann Awards is an awards show, celebrating live entertainment and performing arts in Australia, presented by industry group Live Performance Australia since 2001. Note: 2020 and 2021 were cancelled due to the COVID-19 pandemic.

Year	Nominee / work	Award	Result	Ref.
2011	Sunsets The Farewell Tour	Best Australian Contemporary Concert	Won	

== Mo Awards ==
The Australian Entertainment Mo Awards (commonly known informally as the Mo Awards), were annual Australian entertainment industry awards. They recognise achievements in live entertainment in Australia from 1975 to 2016. Powderfinger won two awards in that time.

Year	Nominee / work	Award	Result (wins only)
1999	Powderfinger	Rock Performers of the Year	Won
2000	Powderfinger	Contemporary Rock Performers of the Year	Won

== Triple J Hottest 100 ==
Powderfinger has appeared in Triple J's Hottest 100 22 times, as well as appearing on five CD releases and one DVD release. Of their nineteen appearances, they topped the chart twice; in 1999 with "These Days", and in 2000 with "My Happiness". "My Happiness" and "These Days" also appeared on CD releases in their respective years.

Year	Ranking	Single	CD?	DVD?
1996	6	"Pick You Up"	No	N/A
1996	18	"D.A.F."	Yes	N/A
1996	32	"Living Type"	No	N/A
1997	66	"JC"	No	N/A
1998	8	"The Day You Come"	Yes	N/A
1998	46	"Don't Wanna Be Left Out"	No	N/A
1999	1	"These Days"	Yes	N/A
1999	25	"Already Gone"	No	N/A
1999	68	"Good-Day Ray"	No	N/A
1999	100	"Passenger"	No	N/A
2000	1	"My Happiness"	Yes	N/A
2000	3	"My Kind of Scene"	No	N/A
2003	4	"(Baby I've Got You) On My Mind"	Yes	Yes
2003	7	"Sunsets"	No	No
2003	10	"Love Your Way"	No	No
2003	76	"Rockin' Rocks"	No	No
2003	77	"Stumblin'"	No	No
2004	9	"Bless My Soul"	No	No
2004	68	"Process This"	No	No
2007	15	"Lost and Running"	No	No
2007	66	"I Don't Remember"	No	No
2009	49	"All of the Dreamers"	Yes	Yes

== Other awards and achievements ==
1999 Music Industry Critics' Awards
Nominated work	Award	Result
"The Day You Come"	Song of the Year	Won
Best EP/Single	Won
Internationalist	Best Australian Album	Won
Best CD/Album Production	Won

In 1999, the band won four awards at the annual Music Industry Critics' Awards (see right), and Internationalist was voted one of the "Best 100 Albums" of the 1990s by JUICE magazine.

Powderfinger has received four Jack Awards from Bourbon whiskey producers Jack Daniels. In 2004, Powderfinger won "Best Live Band" and "Best Live Performance" for the group on Rove, and Jon Coghill won "Best Drummer". In 2005, the group won "Best Tour Art" for their tour The Revolution.

In 2004, Powderfinger were named the "Most Broadcast Act" of the year by the Phonographic Performance Company of Australia.

In 2011, Powderfinger's album "Odyssey Number Five" was voted number one in Triple J's Hottest 100 Australian Albums of all-time music poll.

== See also ==
- Powderfinger discography–includes chart rankings and album certifications.
