= Fingerprints: The Best of Powderfinger, 1994–2000 =

Greatest hits album by Powderfinger
- Released: 30 October 2004 (Australia)
- Recorded: Various
- Genre: Alternative rock
- Label: Universal Music Australia

Powderfinger chronology
Vulture Street (2003)	Fingerprints: The Best of Powderfinger, 1994–2000 (2004)	Dream Days at the Hotel Existence (2007)

Singles from Fingerprints: The Best of Powderfinger, 1994–2000
- 1. "Bless My Soul" Released: October 2004

Professional ratings
Review scores
Source	Rating
Sputnikmusic	link
Soulshine	link
Ciao	(positive) link

Fingerprints: The Best of Powderfinger, 1994–2000 is a greatest hits album by Australian alternative rock band Powderfinger, released on 30 October 2004 in Australia.

The album contained tracks from Powderfinger's first four albums, as well as two previously unreleased songs, "Bless My Soul" and "Process This". "Bless My Soul" was also released as a single. On 17 February 2009, Fingerprints was released in the United States with an alternate track listing including more recent songs and discarding older songs to align with releases that had previously been released in the US. The album was released on the back of the band's success on the TV show Grey's Anatomy, which featured two songs from the album Dream Days at the Hotel Existence.

== Recording and production ==
Prior to the release of Fingerprints, there was some talk of the idea that a best-of album would be a mistake by the band, as they were generally seen as the "end of an artist's creative haul". Australian Music Online, publishing a Universal Music Australia press release, said these fears were not justified, and that the album would be "a Powderfinger biography that really tells the story better than anyone can on paper".

MTV Scene writer Craig Tangsley also commented on fears about the "death" of the band, stating that he spoke to Bernard Fanning about the band's death as "it's inevitable to talk when someone releases a best[-]of album". Fanning denied that the band was finished, instead claiming that Fingerprints was spawned due to a deal with the band's record label. He also assured readers that the band had another album planned.

Ciao reviewer cocoklo agreed with Universal's assessment, stating that "If there ever was a band, in my opinion, that needed a greatest hits album, it's Powderfinger". However, he noted another issue which had some influence on the production of the album; namely, the issue of which songs to include. As the band had only released five albums, they were forced to mostly include the singles they had previously released.

Throughout production stages, the album was not referred to as Fingerprints: The Best of Powderfinger, 1994–2000 but rather by its alternative title, From Heavy Metal to Centenary Medal. It is unknown when the band decided on the final title of the album.

== Album and single releases ==
Fingerprints: The Best of Powderfinger, 1994–2000 was released on 30 October 2004 in Australia, and it entered the ARIA charts on 14 November that year. It spent 17 weeks on the ARIA charts, peaking at #2 for one week. The album was certified double platinum. "Bless My Soul", the only single released from the album, failed to chart. It did, however, appear on the Triple J Hottest 100 in 2004, at position #9. "Process This", which was not released as a single, appeared at #68 on the same list.

== Response ==
Fingerprints: The Best of Powderfinger, 1994–2000 was received well by reviewers. Sputnikmusic contributor Nandrucu gave the album a perfect five, describing it as "perfect way to introduce you" to the band. New song "Bless My Soul" was seen in a positive light: "it has a great opening, with neat little guitar fills popping up all over the place". However, the Nandrucu disliked "Process This", stating the song had "a try-hard feel about it".

Soulshine reviewer Dave Hardwick gave the album three stars, stating that "the cynic in me can't help asking whether that is the point", alluding to the overbearing presence of industry politics regarding the release of a best-of collection, and he complained that there was a lack of surprises in the choice of tracks. However, he agreed that the album was a good starting point for "those new to the band".

Ciao reviewer cocoklo rated the album positively. The new songs on the album were praised, with the comment "both of which are stunning", and stating that none of the songs were disappointing. The review highly recommended the album, and again stated that it was an excellent introduction to the band. Fasterlouder.com.au commentator Elissa said the album contained an excellent selection of songs that represented "essence of the band from its signature melodies", adding that "Bless My Soul" was set "to become a Powderfinger favourite".

== Track listing ==
Powderfinger did not include notable singles "Good-Day Ray", "The Metre", "Take Me In" or any single from their first album, Parables for Wooden Ears, instead including non-single fan favourites "Thrilloilogy", "Belter", and "Sink Low" in their place.

1. "Bless My Soul" – 4:06 (Previously unreleased)
2. "My Happiness" – 4:36 (Odyssey Number Five)
3. "Waiting for the Sun" – 3:54 (Odyssey Number Five)
4. "Pick You Up" – 4:19 (Double Allergic)
5. "Passenger" – 4:20 (Internationalist)
6. "Don't Wanna Be Left Out" – 2:12 (Internationalist)
7. "These Days" – 4:36 (Two Hands version)
8. "The Day You Come" – 3:58 (Internationalist)
9. "D.A.F." – 3:30 (Double Allergic)
10. "My Kind of Scene" – 4:37 (Odyssey Number Five)
11. "Like a Dog" – 4:20 (Odyssey Number Five)
12. "Already Gone" – 3:28 (Internationalist)
13. "Process This" – 3:22 (Previously unreleased)
14. "Belter" – 4:13 (Internationalist)
15. "Living Type" – 3:25 (Double Allergic)
16. "Thrilloilogy" – 6:10 (Odyssey Number Five)
17. "Sink Low" – 2:12 (Parables for Wooden Ears)

== US track listing ==
1. "My Happiness" – 4:36 (Odyssey Number Five)
2. "Lost and Running" – 3:42 (Dream Days at the Hotel Existence)
3. "Love Your Way" – 4:31 (Vulture Street)
4. "These Days" – 4:36 (Two Hands version)
5. "Waiting for the Sun" – 3:54 (Odyssey Number Five)
6. "(Baby I've Got You) On My Mind" – 3:20 (Vulture Street)
7. "Sunsets" – 3:49 (Vulture Street)
8. "My Kind of Scene" – 4:37 (Odyssey Number Five)
9. "Stumblin'" – 3:46 (Vulture Street)
10. "Drifting Further Away" – 3:40 (Dream Days at the Hotel Existence)
11. "Passenger" – 4:20 (Internationalist)
12. "Nobody Sees" – 4:14 (Dream Days at the Hotel Existence)

== Charts ==
=== Weekly charts ===
Chart (2004–05)	Peak position
Australian Albums (ARIA)	2

=== Year-end charts ===
Chart (2004)	Position
Australian Albums Chart	29
Australian Artist Albums Chart	11
Chart (2005)	Position
Australian Albums Chart	49
Australian Artist Albums Chart	15

== Certifications ==
Region	Certification	Certified units/sales
Australia (ARIA)	2× Platinum	140,000^{^}
^{^} Shipments figures based on certification alone.
