= WaveAid =

Fund-raising concert for victims of the 2004 Boxing Day Indian Ocean tsunami

- Genre: Pop and rock music
- Dates: 29 January 2005
- Locations: Sydney Cricket Ground, Sydney, Australia
- Years active: 2005
- Founders: Michael Chugg, Joe Segreto & Tom Lang of IMC / Homebake Festival and Mark Pope of Mark Pope Music
- Website: WaveAid Site

WaveAid was a fund raising concert held on Saturday, 29 January 2005, as a means for raising funds for the victims of the 2004 Indian Ocean earthquake, known as the Boxing Day tsunami. It was held at the Sydney Cricket Ground and broadcast on television by Channel [V] and MTV, and on radio by Triple J, Triple M, NOVA and World Audio Radio 2. The event was organised by Michael Chugg, Joe Segreto of IMC/Homebake Festival and Mark Pope.

Part of the between-band entertainment was the screens to the side of the stage showing live feeds of audience members with captions including important messaging pertaining to the catastrophic results of the tsunami and methods which those in attendance and watching on TV could donate.

== Funds raised ==
The event was mainly organised by the Australian music industry spearheaded by Michael Chugg, Joe Segreto of IMC/Homebake Festival and Mark Pope. They aimed to keep the overhead costs as low as possible so that as much profit as possible would go the affiliated charities. Almost all of these costs were waived or heavily discounted. The organisers estimated that if this had been an ordinary festival, these costs would have been around $3,527,908. WaveAid ended up costing $596,727 to stage.

The money raised from donations and ticket sales came to $2,896,727, meaning that the total money raised was exactly $2,300,000.

== Affiliated charities ==
- UNICEF
- CARE Australia
- Red Cross Australia
- Oxfam Australia
- Community Aid Abroad

== Performers, MCs & selected songs ==
- The Waifs
- Missy Higgins - "Scar".
- Nick Cave - "Red Right Hand", "The Ship Song", "Jack the Ripper".
- Kasey Chambers - "Not Pretty Enough", "Barricades & Brick Walls", "Pony".
- Pete Murray - "Feeler", "So Beautiful".
- Finn Brothers - "Weather With You", "Don't Dream It's Over", "World Where You Live", "Won't Give In", "Throw Your Arms Around Me", "I Got You".
- The Wrights - "Evie - Parts 1, 2 & 3"
- Michael Chugg - MC
- King's Own Scottish Borderers - "Mist Covered Mountain".
- John Butler Trio - "Peaches & Cream", "Treat Yo' Mama", "Hello", "Betterman", "Zebra".
- Silverchair - "Israel's Son", "Emotion Sickness", "Without You", "Greatest View", "Ana's Song (Open Fire)", "The Door", "The Lever".
- Adam Spencer - MC
- Powderfinger - "Bless My Soul", "My Happiness", "Passenger", "These Days", "Love Your Way", "Like a Dog", "On My Mind".
- Midnight Oil - "Read About It", "The Power and the Passion", "King of the Mountain", "Say Your Prayers", "Beds Are Burning", "The Dead Heart", "Forgotten Years", "Best of Both Worlds".

== DVD release ==
The concert was released as a DVD with selected performances from all of the groups. The DVD also featured a 17-minute documentary "Making Waveaid Happen", which includes interviews with artists, press conference footage and interviews with event organisers and promoters. The DVD donates a portion of its earnings to the WaveAid charity also.

1. "London Still" - The Waifs
2. "Lighthouse" - The Waifs
3. "Crazy Train" - The Waifs
4. "This Is How It Goes" - Missy Higgins
5. "Casualty" - Missy Higgins
6. "Scar" - Missy Higgins
7. "The Ship Song" - Nick Cave
8. "Barricades and Brickwalls" - Kasey Chambers
9. "Pony" - Kasey Chambers
10. "Not Pretty Enough" - Kasey Chambers
11. "Fall Your Way" - Pete Murray
12. "Lines" - Pete Murray
13. "Feeler" - Pete Murray
14. "Weather With You" - Finn Brothers
15. "Won't Give In" - Finn Brothers
16. "Throw Your Arms" - Finn Brothers
17. "Evie Pt 1 - Let Your Hair Hang Down" - The Wrights Feat. Nic Cester
18. "Evie Pt 2 - Evie" - The Wrights Feat. Bernard Fanning
19. "Evie Pt 3 - I'm Losing You" - The Wrights Feat. Phil Jamieson
20. "Peaches and Cream" - John Butler Trio
21. "Treat Yo Mama" - John Butler Trio
22. "Hello" - John Butler Trio
23. "Betterman" - John Butler Trio
24. "Zebra" - John Butler Trio
25. "Israel's Son" - Silverchair
26. "Without You" - Silverchair
27. "Ana's Song (Open Fire)" - Silverchair
28. "The Greatest View" - Silverchair
29. "The Door" - Silverchair
30. "Bless My Soul" - Powderfinger
31. "My Happiness" - Powderfinger
32. "Passenger" - Powderfinger
33. "These Days" - Powderfinger
34. "On My Mind" - Powderfinger
35. "Read About It" - Midnight Oil
36. "The Power and the Passion" - Midnight Oil
37. "Say Your Prayers" - Midnight Oil
38. "Beds Are Burning" - Midnight Oil
39. "The Dead Heart" - Midnight Oil
40. "Forgotten Years" - Midnight Oil
41. "Best of Both Worlds" - Midnight Oil

== Certifications ==
Region	Certification	Certified units/sales
Australia (ARIA)	Platinum	15,000^{^}
^{^} Shipments figures based on certification alone.

== Awards and nominations ==
=== Helpmann Awards ===
The Helpmann Awards is an awards show, celebrating live entertainment and performing arts in Australia, presented by industry group Live Performance Australia since 2001. Note: 2020 and 2021 were cancelled due to the COVID-19 pandemic.

Year	Nominee / work	Award	Result	Ref.
2005	Midnight Oil in WaveAid - the Tsunami Relief Concert	Best Performance in an Australian Contemporary Concert	Nominated	
2005	WaveAid - the Tsunami Relief Concert	Best Special Event	Nominated	
