= Odyssey Number Five =

Studio album by Powderfinger
- Released: 4 September 2000
- Recorded: 1999–2000
- Genre: Alternative rock
- Length: 45:26
- Label: Universal Music
- Producer: Nick DiDia

Powderfinger chronology
The Triple M Acoustic Sessions (1998)	Odyssey Number Five (2000)	Vulture Street (2003)

Singles from Odyssey Number Five
- 1. "My Kind of Scene" Released: 2000; 2. "My Happiness" Released: 24 August 2000; 3. "Like a Dog" Released: January 2001; 4. "The Metre" "Waiting for the Sun" Released: 27 June 2001

Odyssey Number Five is the fourth studio album by the Australian rock band Powderfinger, produced by Nick DiDia and released on 4 September 2000 by Universal Music. It won the 2001 ARIA Music Award for Highest Selling Album, Best Group and Best Rock Album. The album is the band's shortest yet, focusing on social, political, and emotional issues that had appeared in prior works, especially Internationalist.

The album produced four singles. The most successful, "My Happiness", became the band’s highest charting single, peaking at #4 on the ARIA Singles Chart, won the 2001 ARIA Music Award for "Single of the Year", and topped Triple J's Hottest 100 in 2000. It also became their highest charting single in the U.S., peaking at 23 on the Modern Rock Tracks chart and peaked at 7 on the New Zealand Singles Chart. The album also featured "These Days", which topped Triple J's Hottest 100 in 1999. The album ranked at number 1 in Triple J's Hottest 100 Australian Albums of All Time poll in 2011.

Many critics lauded the album as Powderfinger's best work, one stating that the album was "the Finger's Crowning Glory"; however, others were critical of the "imitation" contained in the album. Overall, the album won five ARIA Music Awards in 2001 and was certified platinum seven times, and earned an eighth in 2004. Odyssey Number Five was Powderfinger's first album to chart in the United States, as well as the most successful to chart in the U.S. and the band extensively toured North America to promote its release.

== Background, recording, and production ==
In a 1997 interview, Powderfinger bassist John Collins hinted that the group's next album would be similar to their previous album, Internationalist, while frontman Bernard Fanning said in September 2000 that the lyrics on the album, like those on "Waiting for the Sun", were his "most personal and direct yet". Fanning said his lyrics were based on the "obstacles in the way of being in a relationship, especially in our work situation".

Powderfinger worked with producer Nick DiDia on Odyssey Number Five, as they had done on Internationalist, finishing the album in August 2000 after six weeks of recording. The band spent this time ensuring higher quality songs than on Internationalist, which had featured out-of-tune guitars on "Passenger".

Odyssey Number Five was Powderfinger's shortest album when recorded, running approximately 45 minutes. The focus of the album was on restraint, with more simplistic lyrics than previously, and with a plain and simple message intended. Fanning said of his songwriting ethic: "You try and make it something that's got some substance, but also, you can never do that at the cost of it having relevance to what you're singing." Powderfinger manager Paul Piticco commented that "their ethos is to be pushing the limits of their songwriting ability".

Like Powderfinger's previous album, Internationalist, Odyssey Number Five commented on social and political issues heavily, with the primary point of focus being Indigenous Australians. The lyrics of "Like a Dog" attacked former Prime Minister of Australia John Howard's Liberal government for its treatment of Indigenous Australians, and for breaking the "relaxed and comfortable" promise he made in the 1996 Australian federal election. Lead singer Bernard Fanning related this to the band's other ethical stances—refusing to appear on Hey Hey it's Saturday, for its anti-gay commentary, or not allowing Powderfinger songs to be used in jingles, amongst others—stating, "We're not here to set an example. We just want to be happy with ourselves and not end up with a guilty conscience." Fanning said that despite "Like a Dog" being about a political issue, it was not a political song, rather just Powderfinger "voicing our opinions". The band worked with boxer Anthony Mundine on the song's music video, whom Fanning praised as "the perfect lead, in terms of what the song is about and the fact that he's prepared to speak up for what he believes in."

As well as providing social commentary, Odyssey Number Five also discussed love, a recurring motif in Fanning's songwriting. Fanning noted that one of the causes of this was his passion for soul and gospel music, stating that he "listen[s] to a lot of soul music that's unashamedly about love and how good it makes you feel". Lead guitarist Ian Haug agreed, and also noted that the band as a whole were fully committed to Fanning's lyrics, stating "It's really important for us to agree with what Bernard is singing."

Odyssey Number Five marked Powderfinger's first successful attempt to enter the United States market. Fanning told Billboard in a 2001 interview that the band were not taking anything for granted, however, stating, "In America, we haven't really done any work yet to deserve any major popularity", with the "vibes" on previous albums failing to reach the American mainstream. Powderfinger toured extensively around the country, performing in 22 cities. As a result of these efforts, "My Happiness" was briefly placed on rotation on KROQ-FM and several other radio stations. The song ultimately peaked at #23 on the Modern Rock Tracks chart. This success was assisted by the band appearing on the Late Show with David Letterman, and by supporting Coldplay on tour. Guitarist Darren Middleton summarised their work in the United States by stating "This year has been a bit of a blur." For the TV documentary series Great Australian Albums, group members described their working on Odyssey Number Five for series 2, episode 4 in 2008.

== Album and single releases ==
"My Happiness"
A 23-second sample from "My Happiness", which went on to become Powderfinger's most successful single, and helped break into the American market. AllMusic's Dean Carlson commented that in the song, Powderfinger "drowns a hip-hop-inspired guitar riff better than most bands of their stature".

"Like a Dog"
A 15-second sample from "Like a Dog", which aggressively attacks the Howard government, asking "why the hell won’t John Howard say sorry to the Aboriginal people!" The song's riff was written by Haug, and was influenced by his love of Iggy Pop.

Odyssey Number Five was released on 4 September 2000, on the Grudge/Universal record labels. The album was released in the United Kingdom on Polydor, with 15 minutes of video and an additional track, "Nature Boy", at a later date. A sampler version was released in the United States in 2001, containing five tracks.

Four singles were released from the album. "My Kind of Scene" was the first, released as a promotional single in June 2000. The track was written for the 2000 film Mission: Impossible 2, and appeared on its soundtrack. Collins and Middleton recalled that the song was written and produced with photos of Tom Cruise and Nicole Kidman on the wall of the band's studio "as inspiration". They noted that the band made three songs in response to the Mission: Impossible 2 request, and that "My Kind of Scene" was chosen over "Up & Down & Back Again" and "Whatever Makes You Happy".

The second single from the album was "My Happiness", released on 14 August 2000 in Australia. "My Happiness" entered the ARIA Singles Chart at #4, and spent 24 weeks on the chart, making it Powderfinger's highest-charting single in Australia. It peaked at #7 on the New Zealand singles chart, and spent 23 weeks in the top 50. Furthermore, "My Happiness" was Powderfinger's first single to chart in the US, reaching #23 on the Modern Rock Tracks chart.

"Like a Dog" was released as the third single on 15 January 2001. The song was heavy in political sentiment, akin to "The Day You Come" on Internationalist. The riff for the song was written by Ian Haug, and the song's music video featured Australian Aboriginal boxer Anthony Mundine, and was based on the 1980 Martin Scorsese film Raging Bull. Drummer Jon Coghill said the song revolved around the question of "why the hell won't John Howard say sorry to the Aboriginal people!" "Like a Dog" spent one week on the ARIA Singles Chart, at #40.

Two songs from the album, "The Metre" and "Waiting for the Sun", were released as a double A-side to form the final single. The single was released on 21 August 2001, and included a cover of Iron Maiden's "Number of the Beast". "Waiting for the Sun" was written by Fanning as a devotional, gospel style song. He said of the song; "It's about being in a relationship and being really heavily happy with it." "The Metre" spent one week on the ARIA Singles Chart, at #31.

In August 2020, Powderfinger released a "20th anniversary deluxe edition", with 10 additional tracks, four of them previously unreleased.

== Reception ==
Professional ratings
Review scores
Source	Rating
AllMusic	1.5/5 stars
Robert Christgau	(dud)
CMJ	favourable
Entertainment Weekly	B+
Los Angeles Times	2.5/5 stars
New Straits Times	favourable
New York Post	highly favourable
The New Zealand Herald	4/5 stars
PopMatters	favourable
Q	3/5 stars

Odyssey Number Five mostly gained positive reviews, and was more successful than its predecessor, Internationalist. Entertainment Weekly reviewer Marc Weingarten gave the album a B+. He stated that album entered new "terrain" in guitar rock, complimenting the "scratching and clawing guitars", drawing comparisons to Travis ("prim") and Oasis ("mock-grandiose").

AllMusic reviewer Dean Carlson disliked the album, giving it a rating of one and a half stars. He described it as "little more than a slightly off-base perspective into the world of mid-90s American grunge", and described it as highly similar to Neil Young. Despite this, Carlson praised the songs "Odyssey #5" and "My Happiness", stating that "too often, Powderfinger is too earnest, a bit too careful in their career". Carlson noted that despite his critique, the album achieved some success in the American market.

Devon Powers of PopMatters complimented Fanning's vocals and said the focus of the album was "meaty, rolling ballads". Powers noted that many of the songs on the album were "the kind of songs you put on repeat for hours, or days". The main critique was for the "faster numbers", stating that "Like a Dog" "sounds mostly a little bored". The review concluded by noting that the best songs on Odyssey were those not available as "fleeting radio singles and background music".

Odyssey Number Five won the 2001 ARIA Awards for "Album of the Year", "Highest Selling Album", "Best Rock Album", "Best Cover Art", and "Best Group". "My Happiness" won the award for "Single of the Year", while "Like a Dog" was nominated for "Highest Selling Single" and "Best Video". At the 2002 ARIA Awards, "The Metre" was nominated for "Best Group". The album was named "Album of the Year" by Rolling Stone Australia readers, with "My Happiness" taking out "Song of the Year" and Powderfinger receiving "Band of the Year".

In December 2021, the album was listed at no. 16 in Rolling Stone Australia's ‘200 Greatest Albums of All Time’ countdown.

== Track listing ==
All songs written by Powderfinger, except when noted:

Standard edition
No.	Title	Length
1.	"Waiting for the Sun"	3:54
2.	"My Happiness"	4:36
3.	"The Metre"	4:33
4.	"Like a Dog"	4:20
5.	"Odyssey #5"	1:44
6.	"Up & Down & Back Again"	4:24
7.	"My Kind of Scene"	4:37
8.	"These Days"	4:58
9.	"We Should Be Together Now"	3:42
10.	"Thrilloilogy"	6:10
11.	"Whatever Makes You Happy"	2:28
Total length:		45:26

UK edition bonus track
No.	Title	Length
12.	"Nature Boy"	3:36
Total length:		49:02

20th anniversary edition bonus tracks
No.	Title	Writer(s)	Original release	Length
12.	"My Happiness" (acoustic)		Previously unreleased	5:01
13.	"Up & Down & Back Again" (acoustic)		Previously unreleased	4:30
14.	"Nature Boy"		"My Happiness" B-side	3:36
15.	"Fuzzy Wolf"		"My Happiness" B-side	4:09
16.	"Whatever Makes You Happy" (piano version)		"The Metre/Waiting for the Sun" B-side	2:28
17.	"Love My Way"	John Ashton, Tim Butler, Richard Butler, Vince Ely	"Like a Dog" B-side	4:40
18.	"Rocket Reducer No.62"	Rob Tyner, Wayne Kramer, Fred "Sonic" Smith, Michael Davis, Dennis Thompson	"Love Your Way" B-side	4:24
19.	"Transmission"	Ian Curtis, Peter Hook, Stephen Morris, Bernard Sumner	Previously unreleased	3:41
20.	"The Number of the Beast"	Steve Harris	"The Metre/Waiting for the Sun" B-side	4:58
21.	"Let Him Dangle"	Elvis Costello	Previously unreleased	4:34
Total length:				87:27

== Charts ==
=== Weekly charts ===
Chart (2000–2003)	Peak position
Australian Albums (ARIA)	1
New Zealand Albums (RMNZ)	15

=== Year-end charts ===
Chart (2000)	Position
Australian Albums (ARIA)	2
Chart (2001)	Position
Australian Albums (ARIA)	7
Chart (2002)	Position
Australian Albums (ARIA)	90

=== Decade-end charts ===
Chart (2000–2009)	Position
Australian Albums (ARIA)	11

== Certifications ==
Region	Certification	Certified units/sales
Australia (ARIA)	8× Platinum	560,000^{^}
Australia (ARIA) 20th Anniversary Edition	Platinum	70,000^{‡}
^{^} Shipments figures based on certification alone.^{‡} Sales+streaming figures based on certification alone.

== Awards and nominations ==
=== ARIA Awards ===
Year	Nominated work	Award	Result
2001	Odyssey Number Five	Album of the Year	Won
2001	Odyssey Number Five	Highest Selling Album	Won
2001	Odyssey Number Five	Best Rock Album	Won
2001	Odyssey Number Five	Best Cover Art	Won
2001	Odyssey Number Five	Best Group	Won
2001	"My Happiness"	Single of the Year	Won
2001	"Like a Dog"	Highest Selling Single	Nominated
2001	"Like a Dog"	Best Video	Nominated
2002	"The Metre"	Best Group	Nominated

=== Other accolades ===
Year	Provider	Nominated work	Accolade	Result
1999	Triple J	"These Days"	Hottest 100 Inductee	No. 1
2000	Triple J	"My Happiness"	Hottest 100 Inductee	No. 1
2000	Triple J	"My Kind of Scene"	Hottest 100 Inductee	No. 3
2001	APRA	"My Happiness"	Song of the Year	Won
2010	John O'Donnell, Toby Creswell, Craig Mathieson	Odyssey Number Five	100 Best Australian Albums	No. 43
2011	Triple J	Odyssey Number Five	Hottest 100 Australian Albums	No. 1

== Personnel ==
Powderfinger

- Bernard Fanning – lead vocals, guitars, keyboards
- Darren Middleton – guitars, backing vocals
- Ian Haug – guitars
- John Collins – bass guitars
- Jon Coghill – drums, percussion

Production

- Nick DiDia – production, engineering and mixing
- Matt Voigt – assistant engineering
- Anton Hagop – assistant engineer
- Stewart Whitmore – digital editing
- Stephen Marcussen – mastering
- Anton Hagop – assistant production
- Kevin Wilkins – art direction and photography

Additional musicians

- Nick DiDia – percussion
- Alex Pertout – percussion
- Matt Murphy – Hammond organ, Wurlitzer electric piano, Prophet-5 synthesizer
- Daniel Denholm – string arrangements
- Jun Yi Ma – violin
- Naomi Radom – violin
- Fiona Ziegler – violin
- Jacob Plooij – violin
- Mandy Murphy – viola
- Felicity Wyithe – viola
- Peter Morrison – cello
- Maxime Bibeau – contrabass guitar
- Damien Bennett – backing vocals
  Tiddas
- Lou Bennett – backing vocals
- Sally Dastey – backing vocals
- Amy Saunders – backing vocals

== See also ==
- Powderfinger discography
