= Triple J's Hottest 100 of 2000 =

Record chart of songs produced in 2000

2000 Triple J Hottest 100
- Album artwork for the CD compilation

Countdown details
- Date of countdown: January 2001

Countdown highlights
- Winning song: Powderfinger "My Happiness"
- Most entries: Rage Against the Machine (3 tracks)

Chronology
← Previous; 1999	Next → 2001

The 2000 Triple J Hottest 100, announced in January 2001, was the eighth such countdown of the most popular songs of the year, according to listeners of the Australian radio station Triple J. As in previous years, a CD featuring 37 (not necessarily the top 37) songs was released. The CD featured Queens of the Stone Age's song "Feel Good Hit of the Summer" despite it not making the top 100.

== Full list ==
Note: Australian artists

#	Song	Artist	Country of origin
1	My Happiness	Powderfinger	Australia
2	Beautiful Day	U2	Ireland
3	My Kind of Scene	Powderfinger	Australia
4	Teenage Dirtbag	Wheatus	United States
5	Yellow	Coldplay	United Kingdom
6	Frontier Psychiatrist	The Avalanches	Australia
7	Californication	Red Hot Chili Peppers	United States
8	Generator	Foo Fighters	United States
9	Every Fucking City	Paul Kelly	Australia
10	Bohemian Like You	The Dandy Warhols	United States
11	Rip It Up	28 Days	Australia
12	Dirty Jeans	Magic Dirt	Australia
13	Sleep Now in the Fire	Rage Against the Machine	United States
14	Minority	Green Day	United States
15	Teenager of the Year	Lo-Tel	Australia
16	Unsent Letter	Machine Gun Fellatio	Australia
17	Gravity	The Superjesus	Australia
18	Stacked Actors	Foo Fighters	United States
19	Pictures in the Mirror	The Living End	Australia
20	Not the Same	Bodyjar	Australia
21	My Generation	Limp Bizkit	United States
22	Porcelain	Moby	United States
23	Damage	You Am I	Australia
24	Freestyler	Bomfunk MC's	Finland
25	Pacifier	Shihad	New Zealand
26	Mr. E's Beautiful Blues	Eels	United States
27	Take a Look Around	Limp Bizkit	United States
28	Bastard Son	George	Australia
29	Sour Girl	Stone Temple Pilots	United States
30	Please Leave	Jebediah	Australia
31	Why Does It Always Rain on Me?	Travis	United Kingdom
32	Groovejet (If This Ain't Love)	Spiller featuring Sophie Ellis-Bextor	Italy/United Kingdom
33	Rock Show	Grinspoon	Australia
34	Judith	A Perfect Circle	United States
35	We Haven't Turned Around	Gomez	United Kingdom
36	(Rock) Superstar	Cypress Hill	United States
37	Thank You (for Loving Me at My Worst)	The Whitlams	Australia
38	Machismo	Gomez	United Kingdom
39	Taste in Men	Placebo	United Kingdom
40	Last Resort	Papa Roach	United States
41	Penguins & Polarbears	Millencolin	Sweden
42	Everything in Its Right Place	Radiohead	United Kingdom
43	Sunset (Bird of Prey)	Fatboy Slim	United Kingdom
44	Daddy I'm Fine	Sinéad O'Connor	Ireland
45	The Time Is Now	Moloko	United Kingdom
46	Take a Picture	Filter	United States
47	Slave to the Wage	Placebo	United Kingdom
48	Crush the Losers	Regurgitator	Australia
49	Get Off	The Dandy Warhols	United States
50	Naughty	Skulker	Australia
51	Original Prankster	The Offspring	United States
52	Sucker	28 Days	Australia
53	Wasting My Life	The Hippos	United States
54	Man Overboard	Blink-182	United States
55	The Great Beyond	R.E.M.	United States
56	I Love You But...	Friendly	Australia
57	I See You Baby	Groove Armada featuring Gram'ma Funk	United Kingdom/United States
58	Give Up Your Day Job	The Fauves	Australia
59	Beautiful Sharks	Something for Kate	Australia
60	No Man's Woman	Sinead O'Connor	Ireland
61	Spawn	George	Australia
62	Fast as You Can	Fiona Apple	United States
63	Shiver	Coldplay	United Kingdom
64	Black Jesus	Everlast	United States
65	American Shoes	Motor Ace	Australia
66	Fall to the Ground	Bodyjar	Australia
67	Mutha Fukka on a Motorcycle	Machine Gun Fellatio	Australia
68	Heaven Is a Halfpipe	OPM	United States
69	Responsibility	MxPx	United States
70	Superman Supergirl	Killing Heidi	Australia
71	Nothing's Wrong	Frenzal Rhomb	Australia
72	I Know Y'Know I Know	Tex Perkins	Australia
73	Secrets	Grinspoon	Australia
74	One More Time (The Sunshine Song)	Groove Terminator	Australia
75	Wait and Bleed	Slipknot	United States
76	Bottles to the Ground	NOFX	United States
77	Maria	Rage Against the Machine	United States
78	Stand Inside Your Love	The Smashing Pumpkins	United States
79	No Leaf Clover	Metallica and the San Francisco Symphony	United States
80	Hej	Skulker	Australia
81	Make Me Bad	Korn	United States
82	Sunburn	Muse	United Kingdom
83	Kick in the Door	Skunkhour	Australia
84	I Disappear	Metallica	United States
85	Nothing as It Seems	Pearl Jam	United States
86	Hello Cruel World	Klinger	Australia
87	Music	Madonna	United States
88	Rome Wasn't Built in a Day	Morcheeba	United Kingdom
89	Work It Out	Brassy	United Kingdom
90	Good Fortune	PJ Harvey	United Kingdom
91	Start Making Sense	Area-7	Australia
92	Live Without It	Killing Heidi	Australia
93	Set the Record Straight	Reef	United Kingdom
94	The Ground Beneath Her Feet	U2	Ireland
95	Renegades of Funk	Rage Against the Machine	United States
96	Paint Pastel Princess	Silverchair	Australia
97	Ben Lee	Klinger	Australia
98	Death Defy	Motor Ace	Australia
99	Who the Hell Are You	Madison Avenue	Australia
100	Warning	Green Day	United States

== Statistics ==
=== Artists with multiple entries ===
#	Artist	Entries
3	Rage Against the Machine	13, 77, 95
2	Powderfinger	1, 3
2	U2	2, 94
2	Coldplay	5, 63
2	Foo Fighters	8, 18
2	The Dandy Warhols	10, 49
2	28 Days	11, 52
2	Machine Gun Fellatio	16, 67
2	Green Day	14, 100
2	Bodyjar	20, 66
2	Limp Bizkit	21, 27
2	George	28, 61
2	Grinspoon	33, 73
2	Gomez	35, 38
2	Placebo	39, 47
2	Sinéad O'Connor	44, 60
2	Skulker	50, 80
2	Motor Ace	65, 98
2	Killing Heidi	70, 92
2	Metallica	79, 84
2	Klinger	86, 97

=== Countries Represented ===
Country	Entries
Australia	40
United States	37
United Kingdom	17
Ireland	4
Finland	1
New Zealand	1
Italy	1
Sweden	1

=== Records ===
- Scoring songs at #1 and #3, Powderfinger set the current record for best performing pair of songs (ranked by adding their positions). This record was to be equaled by Kings of Leon in 2008. The Offspring held the previous record, with songs at #3 and #4 in 1994.
  - Powderfinger also became the only act at that point to top the countdown twice, after "These Days" topped the 1999 list. Flume would later equal this record after winning the 2016 and 2022 countdowns.
  - Furthermore, Powderfinger the first artist to feature in the top 10 of an annual countdown for three years in a row (1998–2000), and the first artist since The Cranberries (1993–94) to finish in the top 3 for the second year in a row. Both of these records would later be broken by Billie Eilish and Spacey Jane in 2021 and 2022 respectively.
- "Thank You (for Loving Me at My Worst)" by The Whitlams also featured in the 1999 Hottest 100 at #54, as did "Mutha Fukka on a Motorcycle" by Machine Gun Fellatio at #59.
- Bomfunk MC's is the first artist from Finland to appear in the Hottest 100.
- Dave Grohl made his ninth consecutive appearance in the Hottest 100, having featured in every annual countdown to date.
  - Regurgitator made their sixth consecutive appearance, having appeared since 1995.
  - Metallica, Powderfinger, Rage Against the Machine, The Whitlams all made their fifth consecutive appearance, having appeared since 1996.

== Top 10 Albums of 2000 ==
Bold indicates winner of the Hottest 100.

#	Artist	Album	Country of origin	Tracks in the Hottest 100
1	Radiohead	Kid A	United Kingdom	42
2	**Powderfinger**	**Odyssey Number Five**	**Australia**	**1, 3 (1 in 1999)**
3	Coldplay	Parachutes	United Kingdom	5, 63
4	The Dandy Warhols	Thirteen Tales from Urban Bohemia	United States	10, 49
5	Augie March	Sunset Studies	Australia	DNC (61 in 1999), (47 in 2001)
6	The Avalanches	Since I Left You	Australia	6 (8, 76 in 2001)
7	Muse	Showbiz	United Kingdom	82
8	Doves	Lost Souls	United Kingdom	DNC
9	A Perfect Circle	Mer de Noms	United States	34
10	U2	All That You Can't Leave Behind	Ireland	2

== CD release ==
**Disc 1**
1. Powderfinger – "My Happiness" (4:39)
2. Fatboy Slim – "Sunset (Bird of Prey)" (6:51)
3. U2 – "Beautiful Day" (4:06)
4. The Dandy Warhols – "Bohemian Like You" (3:29)
5. Magic Dirt – "Dirty Jeans" (3:41)
6. Bomfunk MC's – "Freestyler" (5:07)
7. Wheatus – "Teenage Dirtbag" (4:02)
8. You Am I – "Damage" (3:27)
9. The Living End – "Pictures in the Mirror" (3:17)
10. Radiohead – "Everything in Its Right Place" (4:11)
11. Lo-Tel – "Teenager of the Year" (4:26)
12. Friendly – "I Love You But..." (3:40)
13. 28 Days – "Rip It Up" (3:39)
14. Blink-182 – "Man Overboard" (2:46)
15. The Avalanches – "Frontier Psychiatrist" (4:49)
16. Spiller – "Groovejet (If This Ain't Love)" (3:48)
17. Skunkhour – "Kick in the Door" (3:03)
18. Area-7 – "Start Making Sense" (3:31)
19. Groove Terminator – "One More Time (The Sunshine Song)" (4:03)
**Disc 2**
1. Foo Fighters – "Generator" (3:49)
2. Machine Gun Fellatio – "Unsent Letter" (5:11)
3. The Superjesus – "Gravity" (4:00)
4. Millencolin – "Penguins & Polarbears" (2:54)
5. Moloko – "The Time Is Now" (4:29)
6. Coldplay – "Yellow" (4:29)
7. Placebo – "Taste in Men" (4:01)
8. OPM – "Heaven Is a Halfpipe" (4:18)
9. PJ Harvey – "Good Fortune" (3:20)
10. Queens of the Stone Age – "Feel Good Hit of the Summer" (2:45)
11. Tex Perkins – "I Know You Know I Know" (4:32)
12. Sinéad O'Connor – "Daddy I'm Fine" (3:00)
13. Eels – "Mr. E's Beautiful Blues" (3:59)
14. Paul Kelly – "Every Fucking City" (3:37)
15. Bodyjar – "Not the Same" (3:10)
16. George – "Bastard Son" (3:19)
17. Everlast – "Black Jesus" (4:22)
18. Groove Armada feat. Gram'ma Funk – "I See You Baby" (3:53)

=== Certifications ===
Region	Certification	Certified units/sales
Australia (ARIA)	Platinum	70,000^{^}
^{^} Shipments figures based on certification alone.

== See also ==
- 2000 in music
