= My Happiness (Powderfinger song) =

2000 song by Powderfinger

Single by Powderfinger

from the album Odyssey Number Five
- B-side: "My Kind of Scene"; "Nature Boy"; "Odyssey #1" (demo)
- Released: 24 August 2000
- Studio: Sing Sing (Melbourne, Australia)
- Genre: Alternative rock
- Length: 4:36
- Label: Universal Music Australia
- Songwriters: Jon Coghill; John Collins; Bernard Fanning; Ian Haug; Darren Middleton
- Producer: Nick DiDia

Powderfinger singles chronology
"My Kind of Scene" (2000)	"My Happiness" (2000)	"Like a Dog" (2001)

Music video
- "My Happiness" on YouTube

"My Happiness" is a song by Australian rock band Powderfinger. It was released through Universal Music Australia in August 2000 as the first single from the band's fourth album, Odyssey Number Five. Powderfinger frontman Bernard Fanning wrote the lyrics for "My Happiness" as a reflection on the time the band spent touring to promote their work, and the loneliness that came as a result. It was inspired by his love of gospel and soul music. The rest of the band are co-credited with Fanning for composing the track. Despite its melancholy mood, "My Happiness" is considered by many to be a love song, a suggestion Fanning regards as mystifying.

"My Happiness" is Powderfinger's highest charting single; it peaked at number four on the Australian ARIA Singles Chart, number seven on the New Zealand Singles Chart, and number 23 on the US Modern Rock Tracks chart—the first Powderfinger song to do so, making it their most successful single in the US. The song was certified septuple platinum in Australia, denoting sales and streaming units of at least 490,000. It won an ARIA Award and an APRA Award and topped the Triple J Hottest 100 in 2000 as well as coming in at number 27 on the Triple J Hottest 100 of All Time in 2009. In January 2018, as part of Triple M's "Ozzest 100", the 'most Australian' songs of all time, "My Happiness" was ranked number 31. In 2025, the song was voted sixth on the Triple J Hottest 100 of Australian Songs.

"My Happiness" was highly praised by critics, with even negative reviews of Odyssey Number Five noting it as a highlight, especially for its catchy chorus. One of the highlights of Powderfinger's United States tour with Coldplay was a performance of "My Happiness" on the Late Show with David Letterman; they were only the fourth Australian act to appear on the show.

== Production and content ==
If you can't cop a bit of emotional stuff then you should go and get the lamp shade extracted from your arse. If you don't think there is enough rock in your life then let me know and I will personally come around to your house and chuck stones at you.

— Bernard Fanning, in response to "My Happiness" being described by fans as "like Lauryn Hill, bland and boring Top 40 bullshit".

The lyrics for "My Happiness" were written by Bernard Fanning, Powderfinger's lead singer and songwriter. The rest of the band are co-credited with Fanning for composing the track. The song describes feelings of love and separation; Fanning called it "a sad story of touring and the absence loneliness that comes with it". The extensive time spent touring took its toll on the band, and it was on the back of this that Fanning wrote "My Happiness". Thus, he expressed confusion at its being considered a romantic song.

Much of Fanning's writing is inspired by non-rock music, and "My Happiness" is no exception. Gospel and soul music that is "unashamedly about love and how good it makes you feel" was common during the Odyssey Number Five recording sessions. Powderfinger worked hard in those sessions to ensure a more polished work than Internationalist; guitarist Darren Middleton concluded that "My Happiness", "The Metre", and "Up & Down & Back Again" were more "complete" because of the band's efforts. The lighter elements of "My Happiness" in comparison to some of the band's earlier work saw Fanning reveal his passion for several other musicians such as James Taylor—something that "five years ago ... would have been an embarrassing thing to say".

== Touring and promotion ==
"My Happiness" was put on heavy rotation by Los Angeles radio station KROQ-FM two months prior to its United States release, and Powderfinger signed a contract with United States label Republic as a result of the song's early success. Although "My Happiness" was subsequently dropped from KROQ's roster, other radio stations continued to give the song high priority.

"My Happiness" peaked at number 23 on the Hot Modern Rock Tracks, making it the first Powderfinger song to appear on a Billboard chart. According to Susan Groves of WHRL, part of the song's success came about because very few people knew of Powderfinger, but were drawn towards "My Happiness" because it was "melodic, [and] pretty"—a change from what she described as "middle of the road rock" popular in the United States. Meanwhile, Australians were "starting to get sick of My Happiness"—Cameron Adams argued in The Hobart Mercury that this was one of the reasons Powderfinger decided to focus on the offshore market.

Powderfinger performed "My Happiness" live on the Late Show with David Letterman while touring North America with British rock group Coldplay. They were the fourth Australian act (after The Living End, Silverchair, and Nick Cave) to play on the show. The band also did free promotional shows leading up to the release of the single. In Europe, "My Happiness" received approximately four weeks of airplay on German music video program Viva II, and the band sold out for three nights in a row in London, partly due to the success of the single.

== Release and commercial success ==
"My Happiness" was released as a single in Australia on 24 August 2000. At the time of the single's release, the band's previous album, Internationalist, was still in the top 50 on the ARIA Albums Chart, 95 weeks after entering. The single includes the B-side "My Kind of Scene", which had already received strong airplay due to its appearance on the Mission: Impossible 2 soundtrack. "My Happiness" appeared on a Triple M compilation entitled Triple M's New Stuff, and on a Kerrang! compilation, Kerrang!^{2} The Album.

"My Happiness" entered the ARIA Singles Chart at number four—making it Powderfinger's highest-charting single in Australia—and spent 24 weeks on the chart. It reached number two on the Queensland singles chart and peaked at number seven on the New Zealand Singles Chart, on which it spent 23 weeks. In the US, "My Happiness" was serviced to alternative radio on 13 February 2001; it was Powderfinger's first single to chart in the US, reaching number 23 on the Modern Rock Tracks chart.

The song won the "Single of the Year" award at the ARIA Awards of 2001, and the 2001 "Song of the Year" APRA Award. Furthermore, "My Happiness" topped the Triple J Hottest 100 chart in 2000, and appeared on that year's CD release. Rolling Stone Australia named "My Happiness" "Song of the Year" in a reader poll. "My Happiness" was the eighth most-played song on Australian radio in 2001.

== Critical reception ==
"My Happiness"
While Chad Watson of The Newcastle Herald described a "restrained yet warmly infectious chorus", Richard Jinman of The Sydney Morning Herald argued the hook was not as "hummable" as some of Powderfinger's other work.

"My Happiness" was critically acclaimed. Cameron Adams of the Herald Sun wrote that "My Happiness" did not disappoint in the trend of excellent first singles from Powderfinger, citing "Pick You Up" and "The Day You Come" as examples. He praised the song's structure, stating that "the verses almost crash into the chorus". Adams also expressed surprise that "My Kind of Scene" was only released as a B-side. The Newcastle Herald's Chad Watson described a mixture of acoustic and electric guitar and "a restrained yet warmly infectious chorus". Despite praising it as a "Big Rock Anthem™", Richard Jinman of The Sydney Morning Herald complained that "My Happiness" was not as "hummable" as past singles "Passenger" or "These Days". Devon Powers of PopMatters described it, and "Waiting for the Sun", as sounding bored. The Evening Mail agreed; it argued the "rock-lite" song, while sounding lush, failed to "make you really sit up and take notice".

Despite being highly critical of Odyssey Number Five, Allmusic's Dean Carlson labelled it, alongside "Odyssey #5", as one of the album's best songs, for the riff Powderfinger executed "better than most bands of their stature". Adams also enjoyed the song's "wobbly guitar", and Sain's Christie Eliszer approved of the "acoustic strumalong", but The Advertiser's Michael Duffy said the song was "a familiar piece of yearning guitar indie that is polished but pedestrian"; he reserved his praise for "My Kind of Scene", which he described as akin to the best of Internationalist. Darren Bunting wrote in the Hull Daily Mail that "My Happiness" was the best song on Odyssey Number Five, praising "soaring vocals, heartfelt lyrics and chiming guitar". Entertainment Weekly's Marc Weingarten said that on "My Happiness", "Fanning's heavy heart is tattered by scratching and clawing guitars".

== Music video ==
A frame from the "My Happiness" music video showing a sentient slinky dancing as Powderfinger perform the song in the background

The music video for "My Happiness" starts at a railway station (Roma Street in Brisbane) with a mother and her son stepping off a train. As the pair leave the train, the boy turns and tries to reach for something, but his mother pulls him back. It is shown that he was reaching for a sentient slinky. The slinky leaves the train, and passes Middleton busking in the train station. The slinky ventures to find the boy, facing a range of challenges along the way; these include avoiding oranges falling on it and riding a skateboard. In the middle of the music clip, the slinky is shown making its way through a café in which Powderfinger are performing the song. It rests on the bar and the band finishes playing, while the background music continues. As Powderfinger leaves, the slinky is picked up by Haug. He gets into a car and places the slinky on the car's dashboard, but it falls out the window as the car turns a tight corner. It lands outside the gate of a house and is picked up by a woman, who brings it to inside. It turns out the house belongs to the boy from the beginning, and his mother brings it to him.

The video was created by Fifty Fifty Films, who created numerous other Powderfinger music videos. It was directed by Chris Applebaum and produced by Keeley Gould of A Band Apart, with editing by Jeff Selis. Cameron Adams of The Courier Mail reported that following the music video's release, slinky sales increased dramatically.

== Awards and accolades ==
Awards and accolades for "My Happiness"
Year	Organisation	Ceremony	Award	Result
2000	Triple J	Hottest 100	—N/a	No. 1
2001	APRA	APRA Awards	Song of the Year	Won
2001	ARIA	ARIA Music Awards	Single of the Year	Won
2001	ARIA	ARIA Music Awards	Highest Selling Single	Nominated

== Track listings ==
Australian CD single

1. "My Happiness" – 4:36
2. "My Kind of Scene" – 4:37
3. "Nature Boy" – 3:12
4. "Odyssey #1" (demo) – 4:09

European CD single

1. "My Happiness" (edit) – 4:11
2. "Nature Boy" – 3:38

== Personnel ==
Powderfinger

- Bernard Fanning – vocals and tambourine
- Darren Middleton – guitars and backing vocals
- Ian Haug – guitars
- John Collins – bass guitars
- Jon Coghill – drums and percussion

Production

- Nick DiDia – Producer, engineer and mixer
- Matt Voigt – Assistant engineer
- Anton Hagop – Assistant engineer
- Alex Pertout – Percussion
- Stewart Whitmore – Digital editing
- Stephen Marcussen – Mastering
- Anton Hagop – Assistant producer
- Kevin Wilkins – Art direction and photography

== Charts ==
=== Weekly charts ===
Weekly chart performance for "My Happiness"
Chart (2000–2001)	Peak position
Australia (ARIA)	4
New Zealand (Recorded Music NZ)	7
US Alternative Airplay (Billboard)	23

=== Year-end charts ===
Year-end chart performance for "My Happiness"
Chart (2000)	Position
Australia (ARIA)	73

Chart (2001)	Position
New Zealand (RIANZ)	22
US Modern Rock Tracks (Billboard)	84

== Certifications ==
Certifications and sales for "My Happiness"
Region	Certification	Certified units/sales
Australia (ARIA)	7× Platinum	490,000^{‡}
New Zealand (RMNZ)	2× Platinum	60,000^{‡}
^{‡} Sales+streaming figures based on certification alone.
