= Powderfinger =

Australian rock band

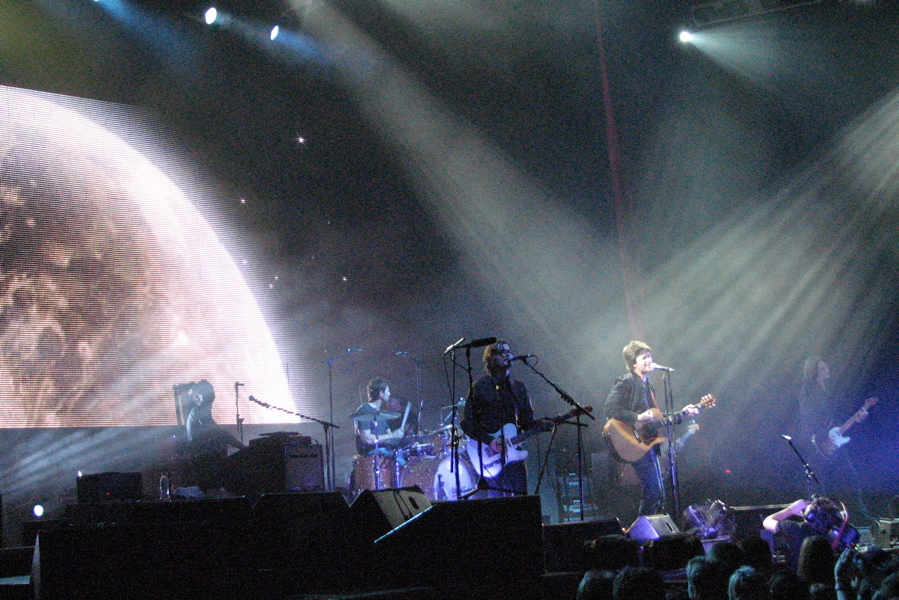
- Powderfinger performing "These Days" on the Across the Great Divide tour, September 2007, Sydney. Left to right: Lachlan Doley (auxiliary musician), Jon Coghill, Darren Middleton, Bernard Fanning, John Collins (obscured), Ian Haug.

Background information
- Also known as: Terry, Bruce, Econodogs
- Origin: Brisbane, Queensland, Australia
- Genres: Rock; alternative rock; hard rock; grunge
- Works: Powderfinger discography
- Years active: 1989–2010, 2020, 2026–present
- Labels: Finger, Polydor, Universal
- Members: John Collins; Ian Haug; Bernard Fanning; Jon Coghill; Darren Middleton
- Past members: Steven Bishop
- Website: powderfinger.com

Powderfinger are an Australian rock band formed in Brisbane, Queensland in 1989. From 1992 until their break-up in 2010, the line-up consisted of vocalist Bernard Fanning, guitarists Darren Middleton and Ian Haug, bass guitarist John Collins and drummer Jon Coghill. The group's third studio album Internationalist peaked at No. 1 on the ARIA Albums Chart in September 1998. They followed with four more number-one studio albums in a row: Odyssey Number Five (September 2000), Vulture Street (July 2003), Dream Days at the Hotel Existence (June 2007) and Golden Rule (November 2009). The band also notched three top-ten singles: "My Happiness" (2000), "(Baby I've Got You) On My Mind" (2003) and "Lost and Running" (2007).

In April 2010, Powderfinger announced that they would be breaking up after their Sunsets Farewell Tour, declaring it would be their last, as they had musically said everything they wanted to say. On 13 November 2010, they played their last show at Brisbane's Riverstage. In November the following year, rock music journalist Dino Scatena and Powderfinger published a biography, Footprints: The Inside Story of Australia's Best Loved Band.

On 23 May 2020, the band reformed virtually for a one-off live-streamed charity performance, One Night Lonely. In October 2026, they announced their reunion for a national Australian tour in September 2027.

Powderfinger are considered one of Australia's most successful rock bands. They earned a total of eighteen ARIA Awards across their career, making them the second-most-awarded band, behind Silverchair. Ten Powderfinger albums and DVDs were certified multi-platinum, with Odyssey Number Five – their most successful album — achieving eightfold platinum certification for shipment of over 560,000 units.

== History ==
=== 1989–1993: Formation and early releases ===
Powderfinger were formed in 1989 by Steven Bishop (ex–the Eternal) on drums, John Collins (ex-the Eternal) on bass guitar, and Ian Haug (the Vibrants, the Fossils) on guitar and vocals. The Eternal, the Vibrants, and the Fossils were other Brisbane-based outfits. All three members of Powderfinger were students at Brisbane Grammar School—a private school in Spring Hill—and they started as a cover band playing pub rock classics by the Rolling Stones, the Doors, Led Zeppelin, Steppenwolf, Rodriguez, and Neil Young. The band's name comes from Young's song of the same name. Despite their popularity in Brisbane, when playing a heavy metal gig in Newcastle, New South Wales, in 1990, Powderfinger were booed off stage.

After completing secondary education, Collins and Haug attended the University of Queensland, where the latter met Bernard Fanning in an economics class – and learned that Fanning had similar interests in music and could sing. Fanning took over the role of lead vocals from Haug and also provided guitar and harmonica. Late in 1990, Jon Coghill—another university student with Fanning and Haug—replaced Bishop on drums, which was described as a "mutual leaving". Bishop later worked in London-based bands based in London, UK, before returning to Brisbane where he was a member of Moonjuice and then the Haymakers. Powderfinger's final line-up change was in 1992 with the addition of Darren Middleton (The Pirates) on guitar, keyboards, and backing vocals. Powderfinger initially performed cover versions of other artists' songs, but gradually developed by writing and performing their own material.

In August 1992, the group self-funded a seven-track self-titled extended play, also known as the Blue EP, on their own Finger label, and the album was distributed by MDS. It was produced by Leroy Bath and Ian Taylor, and recorded at Broken Toys Studios, Brisbane. The EP has an early version of "Save Your Skin", co-written by Coghill, Collins, Haug, Middleton, and Fanning; it was later expanded and released in July 1994 as a single from their debut album, Parables for Wooden Ears. Their second EP, Transfusion, was issued in September 1993 and distributed by Polydor Records. At that time, Simon McKenzie of Time Off noted they were "hoping the major label will put a bit of weight behind the disc, but it's not as though they've signed a record deal or anything". McKenzie felt the EP showed they were "wanting to get heavier and louder for a long time, but is it also a reaction against the sixties tags they've been stuck with?". The five tracks include "Reap What You Sow", which reached the No. 1 spot on the ARIA Alternative Singles Chart, replacing Nirvana's "Heart-Shaped Box". The group recorded their first music video, for "Reap What You Sow"; it was directed by David Barker, who subsequently directed their next seven videos. After the EP's success, the group were signed by Polydor.

=== 1994–1998: Early albums ===
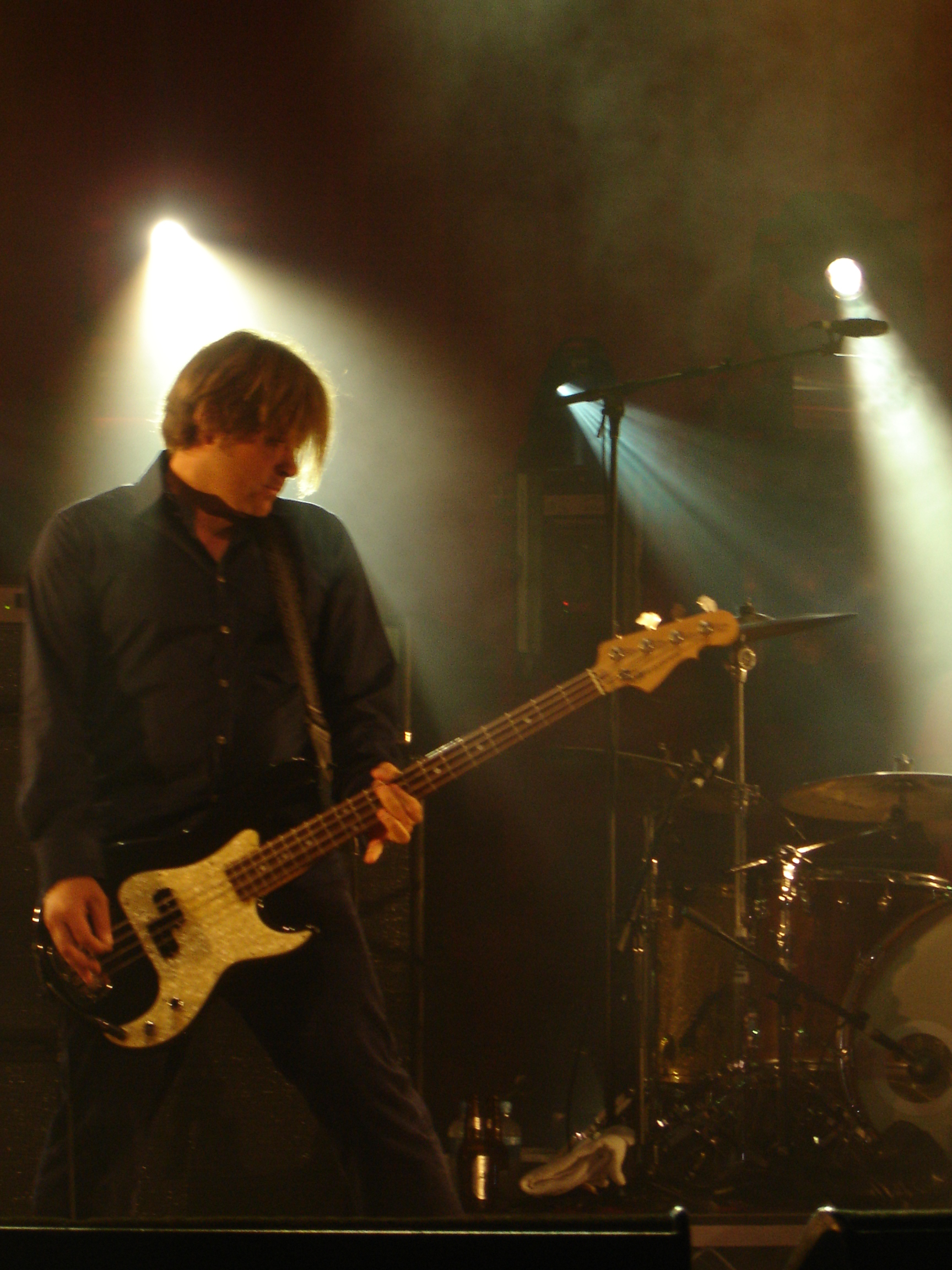
Bass guitarist John Collins, one of the founders of Powderfinger, is shown at the Rock and Soul Revue, Brisbane, in January 2005.

In January 1994, Powderfinger performed on the Big Day Out Tour (see 1994 line-up). On 18 July that year, they released their debut studio album, Parables for Wooden Ears, under Polydor. According to Australian rock music historian Ian McFarlane, it "featured complex, meticulously crafted rock but was somewhat ponderous and sombre, which did little to fulfil the promise displayed on Transfusion". The album was produced by Tony Cohen (Nick Cave and the Bad Seeds, The Cruel Sea), and Fanning later described it as the band's "dark dark days". It received limited radio coverage. Supporting the album's release, the band toured heavily, appearing at the Livid and Homebake music festivals. Powderfinger supported United States visitors Pantera on that group's Driven Downunder Tour '94. Another Australian support act on the tour was Newcastle-formed band Silverchair. Three singles were released from Powderfinger's debut album—"Tail", "Grave Concern", and "Save Your Skin"—but none appeared on the ARIA Singles Chart Top 50. Following the album's release and lukewarm reception, in April 1995, the band recorded at Melbourne's Metropolis Studio with Lachlan "Magoo" Goold (Regurgitator) and in July released a five-track EP, Mr Kneebone.

The band's second studio album, Double Allergic, was issued on 2 September 1996; it peaked at No. 4 on the ARIA Albums Chart and was certified triple platinum by ARIA for shipment of 210,000 units by 2007. It was co-produced by Tim Whitten and the group. McFarlane felt this album was "more self-assured and textured [it] consolidated the band's position at the forefront of the alternative rock scene, alongside the likes of You Am I, Spiderbait, Silverchair, Regurgitator and Tumbleweed. [The album] was full of accessible, spirited rock". Australian rock music journalist Ed Nimmervoll noted "[it] revealed a significant shift towards accessible rock songs rooted in melodic grooves. Powderfinger's reason to be is to create songs strong enough for the band and audience to play and hear months or years down the line". Four singles were released from the album—"Pick You Up", "D.A.F.", "Living Type", and "Take Me In". "Take Me In" was released as a video single featuring several other music videos by the group. FasterLouder, a music review web site, recalled that "when Double Allergic was released in 1996, it showed the band were here for the long haul to become arguably one of the best of the decade". In 1997 the album was issued in Canada and the group toured North America to promote it.

=== 1998–2003: Critical acclaim and chart success ===
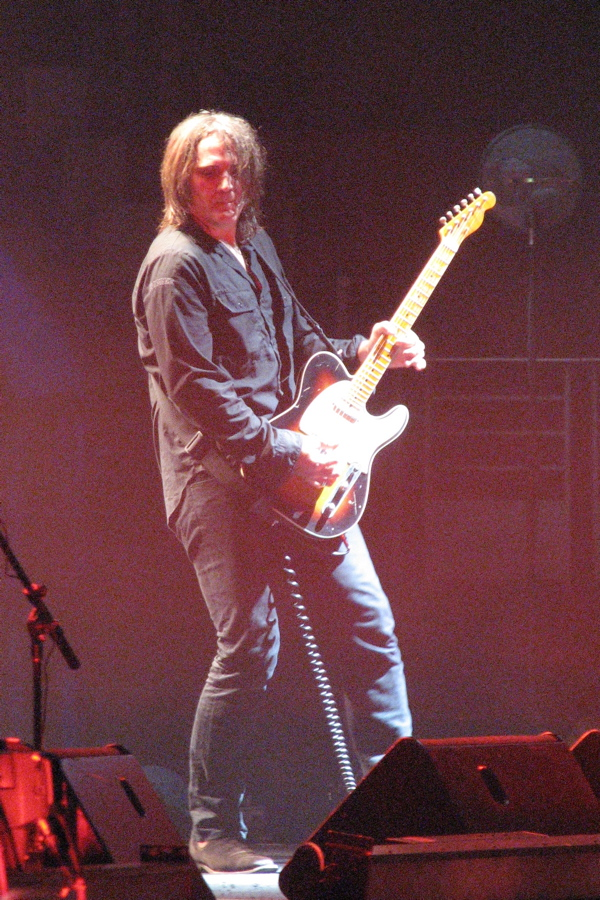
Ian Haug, another founding mainstay, on lead guitar in Sydney in September 2007.

On 7 September 1998, Powderfinger released their third studio album, Internationalist, which peaked at No. 1 and spent 101 weeks in the Top 50 of the ARIA Albums Chart; it was produced by Nick DiDia (Rage Against the Machine, Pearl Jam). AllMusic's Jonathan Lewis had mixed feelings about the album. He was enchanted by its lead single, "The Day You Come"; however, he believed "the rest of the album didn't measure up" except for "some fine tracks" in "Don't Wanna Be Left Out" and "Already Gone". Nevertheless, by 2007 the album had shipped over 350,000 copies and was certified five times platinum domestically, and it had reached European audiences. Internationalist was the first Powderfinger album to win any ARIA Music Awards. At the 1999 ceremony it won "Album of the Year", "Best Rock Album", and "Best Cover Art" (by Kevin Wilkins), and "The Day You Come" won "Single of the Year". "Passenger", another single from Internationalist, was nominated for three additional categories in the following year. The band was both praised and criticised for their political views on Internationalist. In a November 1998 interview with Benedict Watts of Juice Magazine, Haug said that political messages in "The Day You Come" were not something they were just preaching about, but rather were something they saw as a responsibility.

Powderfinger's fourth studio album, Odyssey Number Five, was released on 4 September 2000, and also peaked at No. 1. The single "My Happiness", became their highest charting single, peaking a #4 on the ARIA Singles Chart, "My Happiness" won the 2001 ARIA Music Award for "Single of the Year", and topped Triple J's Hottest 100 in 2000. It also became their highest charting single in the U.S., peaking at 23 on the Modern Rock Tracks chart and peaked at 7 on the New Zealand Singles Chart. Entertainment Weekly's Marc Weingarten provided a positive review and found the group "prove that there's still terrain left to be explored [in] guitar rock ... melancholy is the default mode ... [they] can be as prim as Travis or as mock-grandiose as Oasis". However, Allmusic's Dean Carlson was more negative, seeing the album as "little more than a slightly off-base perspective into the world of mid-90s American grunge". Odyssey Number Five is Powderfinger's most commercially successful album, shipping 560,000 copies and certified eight times platinum by 2004. It also appeared on the New Zealand Albums Chart at No. 15. At the ARIA Music Awards of 2001, the group won "Album of the Year", "Highest Selling Album", "Best Rock Album", "Best Cover Art" (by Wilkins), and "Best Group".

Two of Odyssey Number Five's tracks featured on film soundtracks: "These Days", written for Two Hands (1999), and "My Kind of Scene" in Mission: Impossible 2 (2000). Singles from the album are "My Kind of Scene", "My Happiness", "Like a Dog", and the double A-side "The Metre" / "Waiting for the Sun". At the ARIA Awards ceremony, "My Happiness" won "Single of the Year", and other songs were nominated in various categories. Their tracks received votes from national radio station Triple J's listeners on annual Hottest 100 lists: "These Days" (#1), "Already Gone" (#25), "Good-Day Ray" (#68), and "Passenger" (#100) were ranked in 1999, and "My Happiness" (#1) and "My Kind of Scene" (#3) in 2000. In 2009, "These Days" was voted at No. 21 and "My Happiness" at No. 27 in the Hottest 100 of all time, placing them as second- and fourth-highest Australian tracks after the Hilltop Hoods' "The Nosebleed Section" and Hunters & Collectors' "Throw Your Arms Around Me", respectively.

=== 2003–2005: Rock resurgence ===
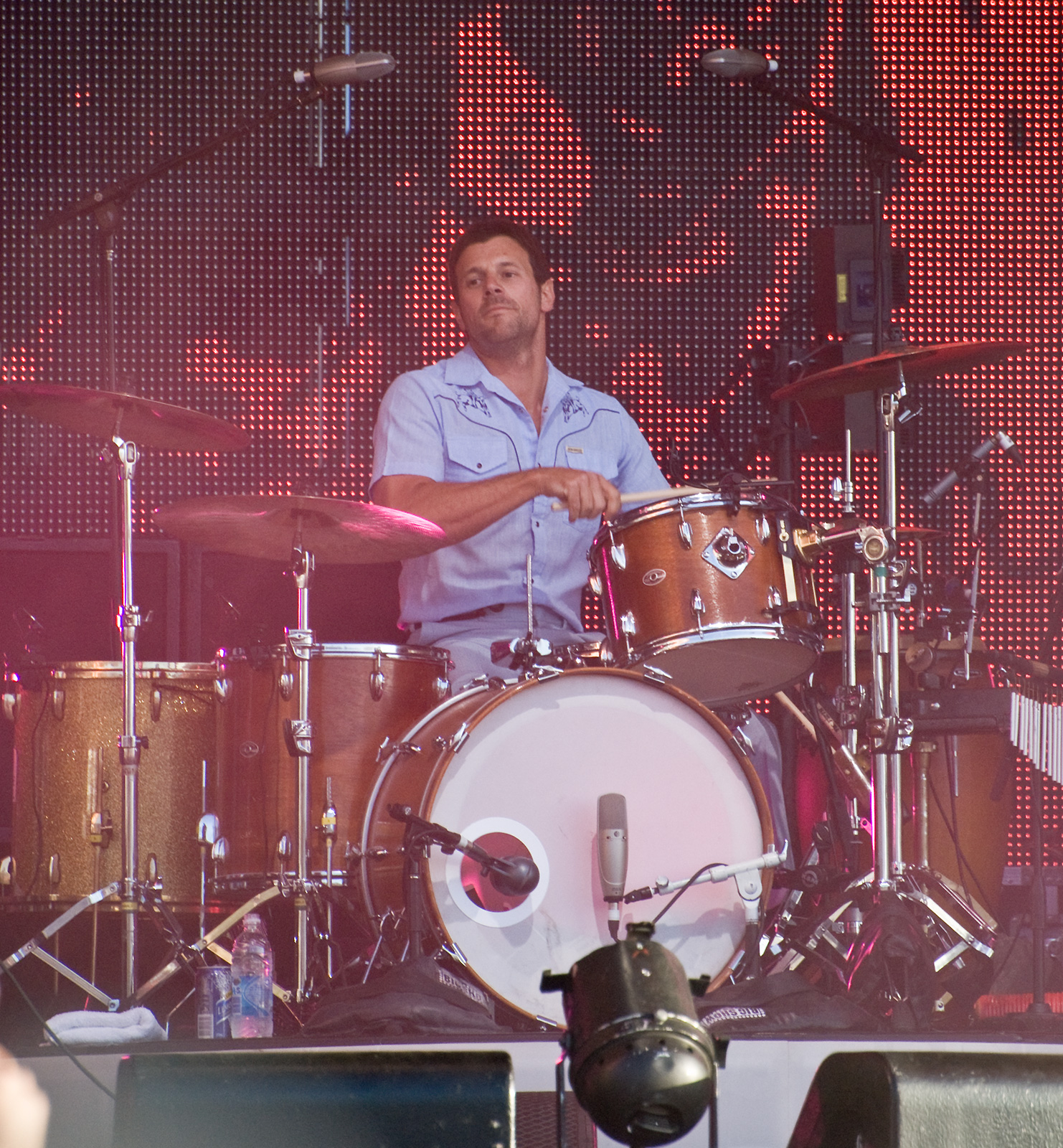
Coghill on drums, in Melbourne, January 2010. He joined in 1990.

Powderfinger's Vulture Street was released on 4 July 2003, and became their third album to peak at No. 1 in Australia, while in New Zealand it reached No. 17. Recorded in January and February 2003, it was named for the location of the band's first recording room in West End, Brisbane. The Sydney Morning Herald's music critic Bernard Zuel approved of "a rawer, louder, but by no means unrefined, album" with "a real energy here that has some connections to early Powderfinger, but bears the mark of a superior intellect"; he felt it had Haug and Middleton "dominating in a way they had not since their 1994 debut" album. Simon Evans of musicOMH described the group as having "opted for a visceral live feel, adding a real punch to songs". Middleton explained that the band's aim was to "get a sound in the songs that was reminiscent of things we grew up loving, which was Bowie, Zeppelin, Kiss ... that sort of thing; all based in the 70s. We wanted to sonically have that as well, so it's a very old-school-sounding record. It's all the old amps, we used old guitars and recorded to tape, of course. It's fairly organic in that sense". Vulture Street won four ARIA Awards in 2003: "Album of the Year", "Best Group", "Best Rock Album", and "Best Cover Art" (by Steven Gorrow, Revolution Design). Singles issued from the album are: "(Baby I've Got You) On My Mind", "Since You've Been Gone", "Love Your Way", and "Sunsets". Tracks were also nominated for awards in 2003 and 2004.

In September 2004 the group issued their first live album, These Days: Live in Concert, initially as a CD, and followed in October with a two-disc DVD. One single, "Stumblin'", which had appeared on Vulture Street, was issued as a live version. In late October they released a compilation album, Fingerprints: The Best of Powderfinger, 1994–2000, which included many of their singles from the first four albums as well as non-singles "Thrilloilogy" and "Belter", and a re-release of "These Days". "These Days", although never officially released as a single, was ranked at No. 1 on the Triple J Hottest 100 poll of 1999. The album also included two new songs: "Bless My Soul" and "Process This", although only "Bless My Soul" was released as a single. Following the 2004 Indian Ocean earthquake and tsunami, Powderfinger appeared at the WaveAid fundraising concert in January 2005 in Sydney, to raise funds for aid organisations working in the disaster-affected areas. Fanning, as a member of The Wrights, sang lead vocals on "Evie, part 2" at the concert. The Wrights released a studio version in March as a single with some of the proceeds going to tsunami relief efforts.

=== 2005–2006: Side projects ===
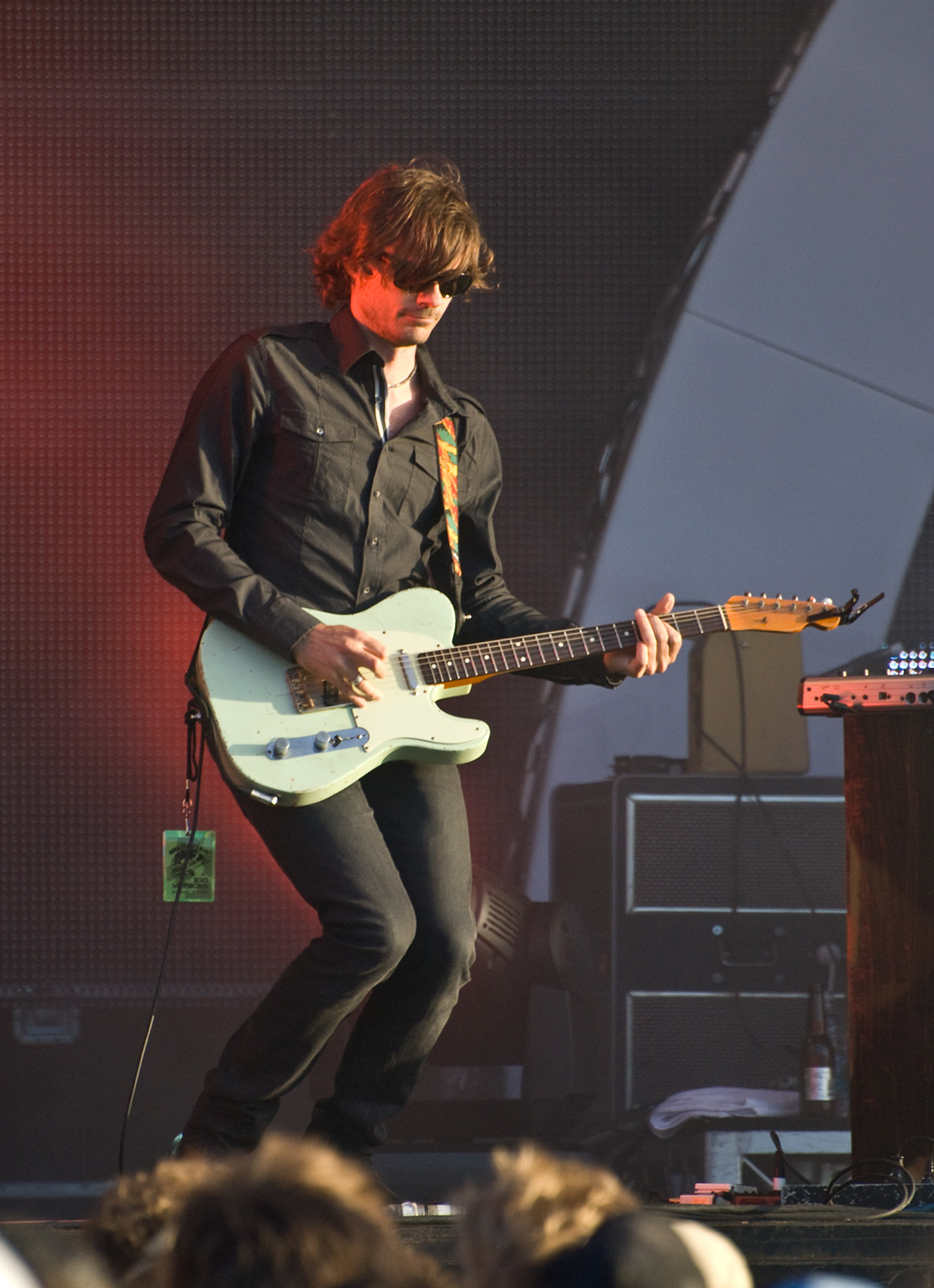
Darren Middleton on guitar in January 2010 at Big Day Out, Melbourne. He joined in 1992 and formed a side project, Drag, in 2001. During Powderfinger's 2005–07 hiatus, Drag regrouped.

After the WaveAid concert, from early 2005, Powderfinger had a period of hiatus. During the separation, most band members pursued other musical projects; on the personal front, Haug and Middleton each had children, and Fanning met his future wife. Middleton's side project, Drag, had issued an EP, Gas Food Lodging, in 2002. Zombos Reviews found the EP was "full of well-written jangly pop, and has some rather nice ballads". Their debut album, The Way Out, recorded in March 2005 and released on 10 July, was "a tad disappointing [compared with the EP] ... mostly mid-tempo pop-rock songs, mixed with some slower, pretty ballads. Everything's tastefully arranged, and there's always nice melodies and harmonies". Collins and Haug formed The Predators with Powderfinger's former drummer, Steven Bishop, now on drums and lead vocals. The group released a six-track EP, Pick Up the Pace, in July 2006 and undertook a short tour around Australia.

In October 2005 Fanning issued his debut solo album, Tea & Sympathy, which reached No. 1 in Australia and No. 11 in New Zealand. At the ARIA Music Awards of 2006, Fanning won in four categories including "Album of the Year" for Tea & Sympathy and "Best Video" for its lead single, "Wish You Well". "Wish You Well" was ranked at No. 1 on the Triple J Hottest 100 poll in 2005. At the end of 2006, Fanning toured in support of the album's release in the United Kingdom and North America; at its conclusion, Powderfinger resumed from their hiatus. Fanning compared his solo work to Powderfinger recordings, saying, "when a problem came up in the studio, especially guitar-wise, I've always had Darren and Ian to call on. They could usually come up with something good. But I played all the guitar on it, and my abilities are fairly limited" and that "Powderfinger is my real job and I'm looking forward to doing it again".

=== 2007–2008: Return from hiatus ===
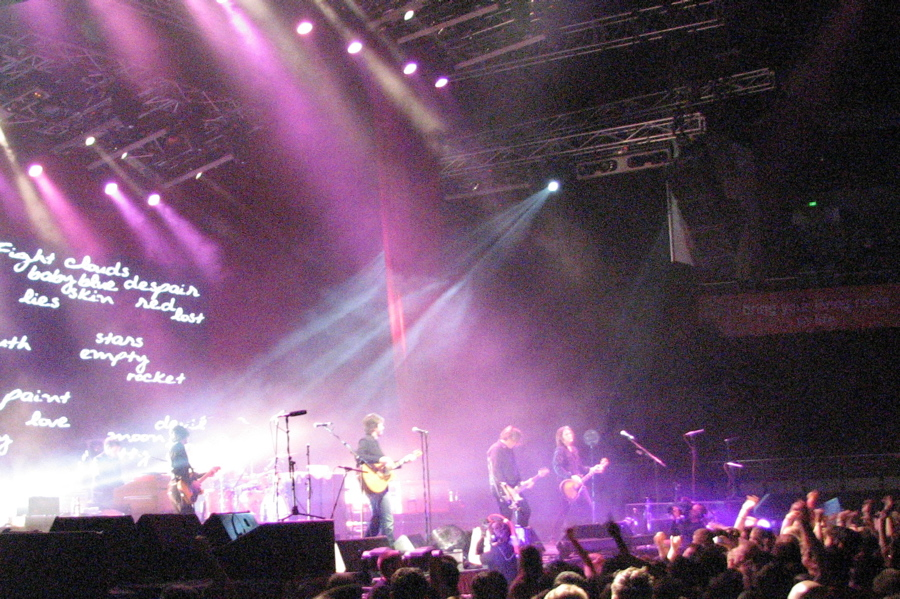
A performance of "I Don't Remember" on the Across the Great Divide tour. Middleton, Fanning, Collins and Haug are visible, Coghill is obscured.

Powderfinger started recording their sixth studio album, Dream Days at the Hotel Existence, in January 2007; it was released on 2 June. Debuting at No. 1 on the ARIA Albums Chart—their fourth to do so consecutively—it broke the Australian digital sales record with over 3,000 copies sold online. In general, reviewers did not rate it as highly as its predecessor Vulture Street, with Cameron Adams of the Herald Sun HiT describing it as "No radical reinvention, no huge change in direction ... In a word: consistent". Zuel described it as "Powderfinger's first dull album" but the band as "the biggest rock band in the country." "Lost and Running", their first single for three years, had been issued in May, and reached No. 5. A second single, "I Don't Remember", appeared in August. One song from the album, "Black Tears", was amended following concerns that it could prejudice a trial over the 2004 Palm Island death in custody case. Fanning stated that an alternative version would be on the album as a result of the concerns. On 18 August that year, Powderfinger performed a concert in Karratha as part of Triple J's AWOL Series. The band was supported by The Grates and Muph N Plutonic, and various local acts. While in Karratha, Fanning and Coghill visited Gumala Mirnuwarni, a local school in Roebourne that encourages children to stay in school.

In June 2007 Powderfinger and Silverchair announced the nine-week Across the Great Divide tour to promote reconciliation with Indigenous Australians. From August to October that year the two groups toured all state capital cities as well as fourteen Australian regional centres, and included four performances in New Zealand. They performed 34 concerts in 26 towns across Australia, with an estimated total of 220,000 people in attendance. On 1 December, a triple-DVD set was released with the same title as the tour, with the Melbourne performances for both bands and backstage footage from the tour. The schedule consisted of three main parts, beginning with a supporting artist performing one set, followed by Silverchair and then Powderfinger playing the final set. The two bands united on stage during only three performances throughout the tour, including Daniel Johns (Silverchair) and Fanning sharing lead vocals on a cover version of The Who's "Substitute" at one show in Sydney and two in Melbourne.

Dream Days at the Hotel Existence was the recipient of the ARIA Award for "Best Cover Art" in 2007. It was also nominated for "Album of the Year", "Best Rock Album", and "Best Group", while "Lost and Running" received nominations for "Single of the Year" and "Best Video". Powderfinger failed to win any of these awards, with tour mates Silverchair's Young Modern and "Straight Lines" obtaining all five. On 28 October at the ceremony, Powderfinger performed "Lost and Running". The third single from Dream Days at the Hotel Existence, "Nobody Sees", was released in December 2007. On 27 September 2008, Powderfinger performed "(Baby I've Got You) On My Mind" and AC/DC's "Long Way to the Top" at the AFL Grand Final. Their song "Drifting Further Away" featured on Grey's Anatomy's fifth season in episode 13, "Stairway to Heaven", which aired on 21 January 2009.

=== 2009–2010: Golden Rule and disbandment ===
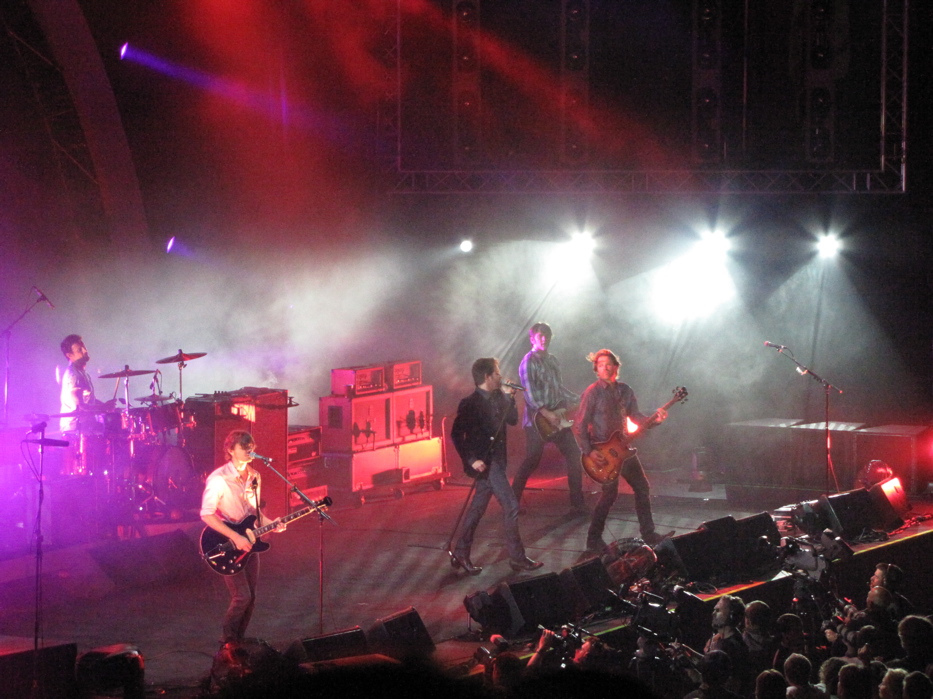
Powderfinger performing on their Sunsets Farewell Tour, 6 November 2010, Sydney. They played their final show at the River Stage in Brisbane one week later in front of 10,000 fans. The last song was "These Days"; the group disbanded after the tour.

From mid-June 2009 Powderfinger worked with DiDia producing their seventh studio album, Golden Rule, which was issued on 13 November. The album peaked at No. 1 on the ARIA albums chart, becoming their fifth studio album in a row to do so. The album's lead single, "All of the Dreamers", was released in September. "Burn Your Name", the second single, followed in December. That same month the band performed at the 2009 Homebake festival after a 10-year absence. In late January they toured on the 2010 Big Day Out. The third single from the album, "Sail the Widest Stretch", appeared in April.

Also in April 2010, Powderfinger announced that after 21 years the group would disband following their Sunsets Farewell Tour in September and October that year:

With the completion of our last album, Golden Rule, we feel that we have said all that we want to say as a musical group. We firmly believe that it is our most complete and satisfying album and can't think of a better way to farewell our fans than with music that we all believe in and also with, hopefully, our best tour to date.

— Bernard Fanning on behalf of Powderfinger, Powderfinger Official Website, April 2010

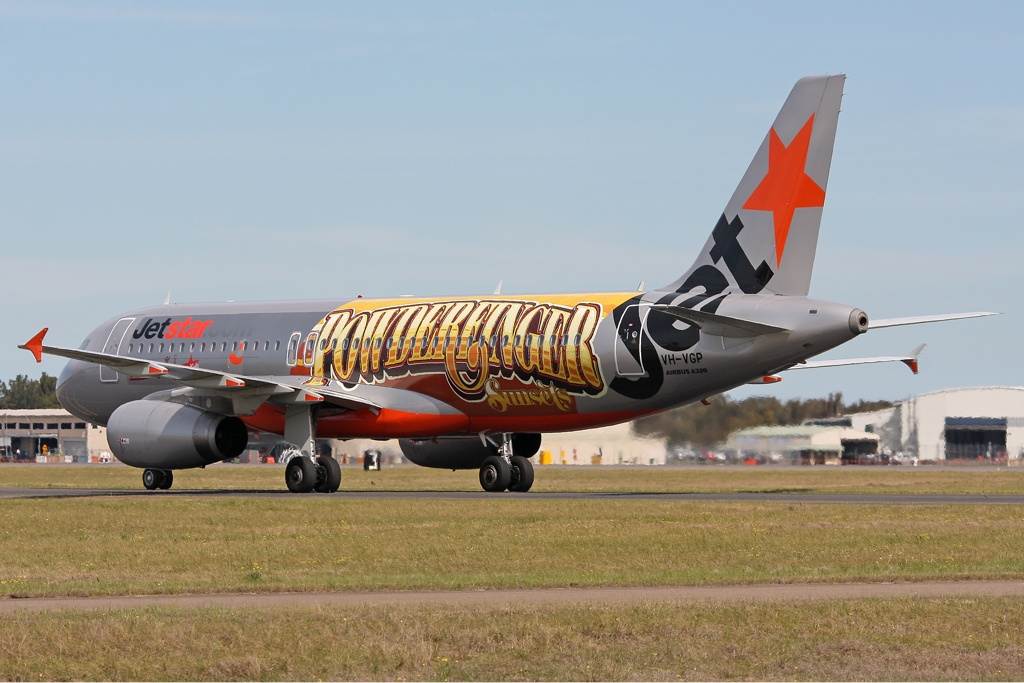
A Jetstar Airbus A320 with Powderfinger logo at Newcastle Airport in September 2010. It was used on the Sunsets Farewell Tour.

Coghill told Australian Times that the final tour is "going to be great fun, but it's also going to be sad". He confirmed that he had no plans to start a new band or for a solo project. Instead he intended to finish his degree, "[o]nce I'm done with that, I might put the feelers out and see what's happening. I don't think I'd be doing anything solo, but I might look to join other bands, just to have a chance to keep playing. I'm just not keen to be off touring the world anymore". Powderfinger played their final show at the River Stage in Brisbane on 13 November 2010 in front of 10,000 fans; the last song they performed was "These Days". On 25 January 2011 the band issued a previously unreleased track, "I'm on Your Side", as a fundraiser for the Premier's Flood Appeal as a result of major flooding in Queensland from December the previous year into January. The song was available via the band's website with all proceeds going towards the cause. On 8 November 2011, the group released a second compilation album, Footprints: The Best of Powderfinger, 2001–2011, containing two new tracks. There was also a 2-disc release, Fingerprints & Footprints – The Ultimate Collection, combining both Fingerprints and Footprints in one set. Also in November, Dino Scatena, together with the band, published a biography, Footprints: the inside story of Australia's best loved band. Scatena, a rock music journalist, had started writing the book in October of the previous year, during the Sunsets Farewell Tour.

=== 2010–present: Post-split activity and reunions ===
Former Powderfinger member Bernard Fanning worked on his second solo album Departures during late 2012 in Los Angeles, with Joe Chiccarelli producing. It was released in June the following year and peaked at No. 1 on the ARIA Albums Chart. Middleton had relocated to Melbourne and worked with Red Door Sounds' Paul Annison. In December that year Middleton revealed that he was "halfway through a new record". Middleton's album, Translations, was released independently in November 2013. Around the same time Coghill was working as a journalist on the Gold Coast, while Collins was "developing business projects in Queensland".

In January 2013 Haug produced the second album by Brisbane-based folk duo Cole and Van Dijk, Sins of a Li'l Later Kiss. He then joined the Church, replacing Marty Willson-Piper, and featured on their 2014 album Further/Deeper.

On 23 May 2020, Powderfinger reformed virtually for a one-off live-streamed YouTube charity performance titled One Night Lonely, with all proceeds going to Beyond Blue and Support Act. The band member recorded their performances separately, unable to appear together in person due to ongoing COVID-19 restrictions. On 25 May, an EP of the performance was released.

On 31 August 2020, Powderfinger confirmed the release of a compilation album of unreleased songs titled Unreleased (1998–2010), released on 27 November 2020. It was preceded by the single "Day by Day", released on 18 September.

In October 2026, footage of scrolling numbers and letters appeared as projections in various locations across Sydney, Melbourne and Brisbane. These were quickly linked back to Powderfinger, who were sharing clips of the projection on their official social media accounts. They confirmed their involvement with a teaser post, before officially announcing their imminent reunion on October 9, 2026. The band are slated to undertake an Australian tour in September and October 2027, which was announced on October 12, 2026.

== Musical style ==
Powderfinger's musical style includes hard rock and alternative music and, according to McFarlane, "the band made its mark with an earthy, blues-based sound that combined soaring, 1970s-influenced riff-rock with 1990s studio technology. With the added textures of folk, country and a soulful groove, the band was able to head in any direction". Nimmervoll acclaimed them as "one of Australia's most popular radio-friendly rock bands" which "produced music the rest of Australia embraced". McFarlane was partially disappointed with their debut 1994 album Parables for Wooden Ears compared to their earlier EP Transfusion. Their 1996 album, Double Allergic, was "more self-assured and textured" and "consolidated the band's position at the forefront of the alternative rock scene". It "revealed a significant shift towards accessible rock songs rooted in melodic grooves" according to Nimmervoll.

In a November 2007 interview with Paul Cashmere of the website Undercover, Middleton stated that a couple of songs they had initially written for Vulture Street "were just too Odyssey Number Five based", and that the first track, "Rockin' Rocks", was "probably the start of where we were heading with the album". Cashmere stated that the album was "the toughest [he has] heard Powderfinger sound". Zuel reviewed two of Powderfinger's more recent albums, and described Vulture Street as "a rawer, louder" album in comparison to Odyssey Number Five; it highlighted Fanning's "talent as a lyricist" and he stated that it featured guitarists Haug and Middleton "dominating in a way they haven't since their 1994 debut". Zuel also stated that there is a "real energy here that has some connections to early Powderfinger," and described "On My Mind" as having "AC/DC meatiness", and "Love Your Way" as "acoustic tumbling into weaving Zeppelin lines". In his review of Dream Days at the Hotel Existence, Zuel described it as "[having] high-gloss and muscular framework," and stated that that was what "American radio considers serious rock."

Compared with the relatively lean, agile sound they've perfected up to now, this is Powderfinger as the footballer who in the off-season spends his time in the gym and emerges buff and beefy. The problem is he has bulk but has traded in his nimbleness.

— Bernard Zuel, The Sydney Morning Herald, 1 June 2007

Clayton Bolger of AllMusic stated in his review of Dream Days at the Hotel Existence that Powderfinger "largely revisit the sound of their Internationalist album, leaving behind much of the glam and swagger of 2003's Vulture Street". He commented on Fanning's "commanding and distinctive vocals", the "twin-guitar attack" of Middleton and Haug, Collins' "innovative basslines", and the "powerhouse drum work" of Coghill. Nimmervoll described Golden Rule as "Powderfinger back to its essence. They'd experimented with the sound, tried different things with the songwriting process and recorded in America with different producers. [It] was recorded at home, the band reunited with American Nick DiDia, who had previously worked with the band during the "classic" era, producing Internationalist, Odyssey Number 5 and Vulture Street. They also wrote the songs as a team, with Bernard responsible for the bulk of the lyrics. The album was recorded in the same spirit, as close to the live sound as a studio album could be".

== Philanthropy ==
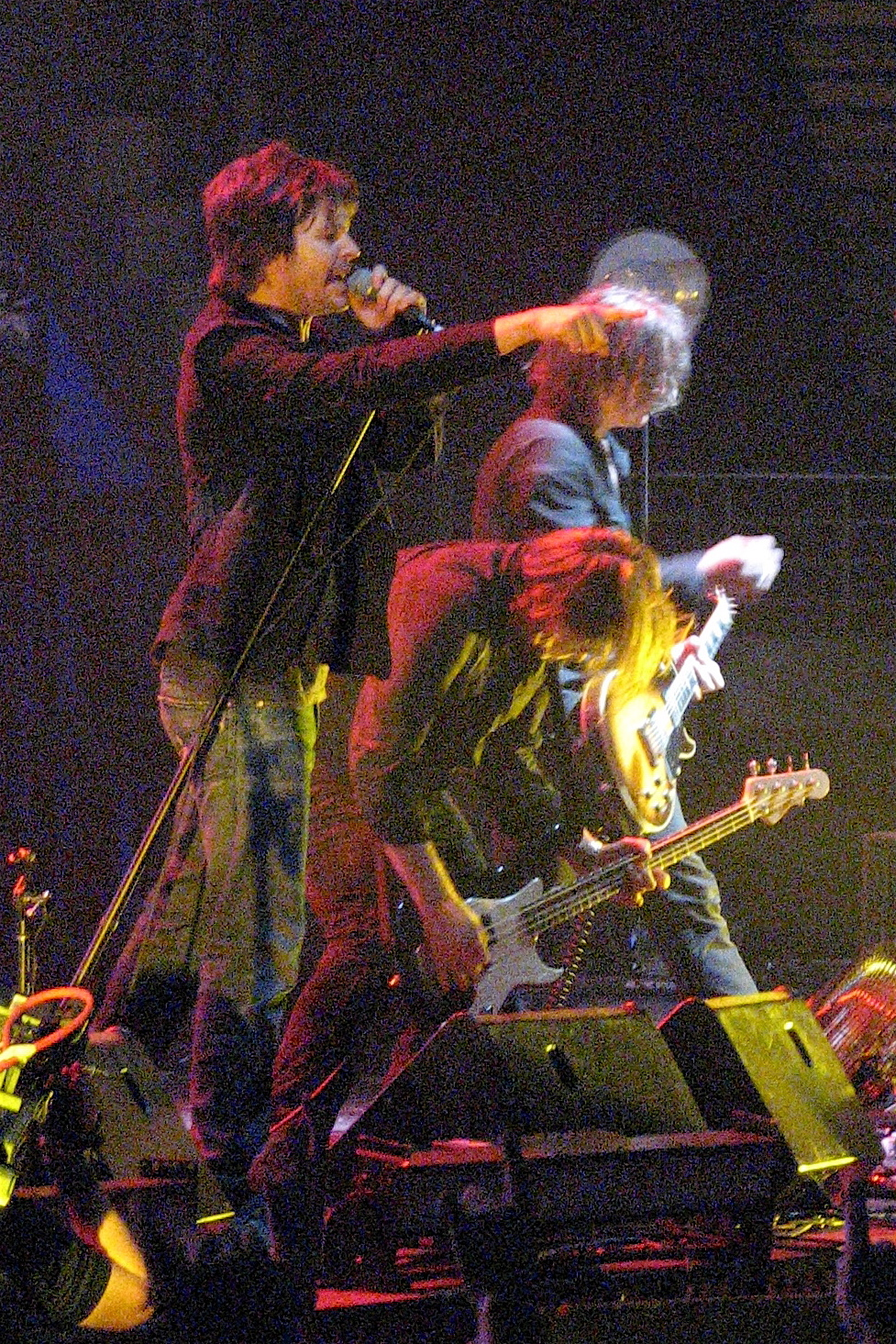
The Across the Great Divide Tour by Powderfinger and Silverchair promoted Reconciliation Australia's efforts in the Indigenous community.

Powderfinger were active in supporting causes or opposing actions taken in charitable, philanthropic, disaster, and political circumstances. In 1996, when Crowded House decided to break up, they organised a farewell concert as a charity event for the Sydney Children's Hospital on 24 November. They approached Powderfinger and fellow Australian acts Custard and You Am I to also appear on the steps of the Sydney Opera House. The charity event, which was recorded and later released as a live album titled Farewell to the World, was claimed to have the largest Australian live concert audience, with estimates of between 100,000 and 250,000 people. In the wake of the 2004 Indian Ocean earthquake and tsunami, Powderfinger performed at the WaveAid fundraising concert in Sydney in January 2005. The disaster killed more than 225,000 people from 11 countries in the area. The total profit from the funds raised from ticket sales and donations was A$2,300,000, however most of this money was spent in the administrative stream with little reaching those affected.

The song "Black Tears" from the album Dream Days at the Hotel Existence originally had the lyric "An island watchhouse bed, a black man's lying dead", which sparked fears that it might prejudice the trial of the former Senior Sergeant Chris Hurley over the 2004 Palm Island death in custody case. The band claimed that the song's lyrics primarily dealt with the climbing of Uluru by tourists despite requests from the Indigenous people of the area to respect their sacred sites and not climb. The original version of the song was retracted from the album, and replaced with an alternative version with the criticised material removed. The legal team for Hurley, who was charged with manslaughter over the death of Mulrunji in 2004, had referred the song to the Attorney-General of Queensland, Kerry Shine, in their attempt at altering the track. One of Hurley's lawyers, Glen Cranny, stated that "the content and proposed timing of the song's release raises some serious concerns regarding Mr Hurley's trial". Powderfinger's band manager, Paul Piticco, stated that Fanning had confirmed that a line in the song was related to the case. However, he added that the lyric in question could refer to "a watchhouse in The Bahamas or something".

In June 2007, Powderfinger and Silverchair announced their combined Across the Great Divide Tour, which promoted Reconciliation Australia, a foundation helping to improve the welfare of the Indigenous people of Australia, and to "show [that] both bands are behind the idea of reconciliation". Reconciliation Australia increased the awareness of the 17-year difference in life expectancy between the Indigenous and non-Indigenous children of Australia. In October that year, during Breast Cancer Awareness Month, Powderfinger performed another concert on the steps of the Sydney Opera House. This concert was for invitees only – breast cancer patients, survivors, and their families were eligible to attend. Powderfinger performed alongside Silverchair, Missy Higgins, and other artists to an audience of 700. The concert was filmed and later broadcast as a MAX Session on Foxtel channel MAX on 3 November.

For the Sunsets Farewell Tour in September 2010, the band promoted another Indigenous cause, the Yalari organisation. The organisation provides Indigenous children with opportunities to get a proper education. In January 2011, following the Queensland flood disaster, [undercover.fm] reported that Powderfinger would not reform for a benefit concert, but the band instead donated a never-before-released track, "I'm on Your Side", to help raise money for the victims.

== Personnel ==
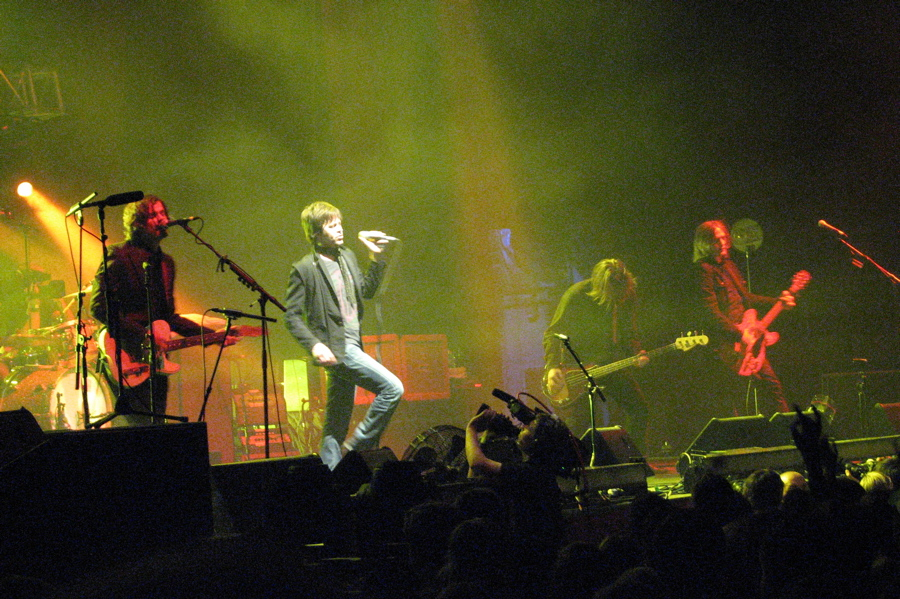
Powderfinger performing on the Across the Great Divide Tour in September 2007. Left to right: Middleton, Fanning, Collins, Haug.

=== Current members ===
- Ian Haug – lead guitar, backing vocals (1989–2010, 2020, 2026–present), lead vocals, rhythm guitar (1989)
- John Collins – bass guitar (1989–2010, 2020, 2026–present)
- Bernard Fanning – lead vocals, rhythm guitar, keyboards, harmonica, auxiliary percussion (1989–2010, 2020, 2026–present)
- Darren Middleton – rhythm guitar, keyboards, backing vocals (1992–2010, 2020, 2026–present)
- Jon Coghill – drums, percussion (1992–2010, 2020, 2026–present)

=== Former members ===
- Steven Bishop – drums, percussion (1989–1992)

== Awards and accolades ==
Powderfinger was highly successful in the Australian recording industry, being a recipient of the industry's flagship awards, the ARIA Music Awards, 18 times from 47 nominations—the third-highest tally, behind Silverchair's 21 wins from 49 nominations and John Farnham's 20 wins from 56 nominations. Powderfinger's most successful year was 2001 when they won six awards from eight nominations for Odyssey Number Five and its related singles. "These Days" and "My Happiness" were ranked at No. 1 on the Triple J Hottest 100 lists in 1999 and 2000, respectively, and 21 other Powderfinger tracks have ranked on lists in other years.

In 2009, as part of the Q150 celebrations, Powderfinger were announced as one of the Q150 Icons of Queensland for their role as "Influential Artists". At the ARIA Music Awards of 1996, they performed "Pick You Up"; in 2019, Dan Condon of Double J rated this as one of the "7 great performances from the history of the ARIA Awards."

== Discography ==
- Parables for Wooden Ears (1994)
- Double Allergic (1996)
- Internationalist (1998)
- Odyssey Number Five (2000)
- Vulture Street (2003)
- Dream Days at the Hotel Existence (2007)
- Golden Rule (2009)

== See also ==
- Music of Australia
- Popular entertainment in Brisbane
