= These Days (Powderfinger song) =

Promotional single by Powderfinger

from the album Two Hands (Original Motion Picture Soundtrack) and Odyssey Number Five
- Released: 1999 (Australia)
- Recorded: 1998, Sing Sing Studios, Melbourne, Australia
- Genre: Alternative rock
- Length: 4:15 (Single version); 4:39 (Two Hands version); 4:58 (Odyssey Number Five version)
- Label: Universal Music
- Songwriters: Jon Coghill, John Collins, Bernard Fanning, Ian Haug, Darren Middleton
- Producer: Nick DiDia

"These Days" is a 1999 song by Australian alternative rock band Powderfinger, later included on their fourth studio album, Odyssey Number Five.

"These Days" was not released as a single; however, it topped the Triple J Hottest 100 chart in 1999. It was also awarded Song of the Year at the 2000 Music Critic's Awards. Powderfinger have described "These Days" as one of their most simple, enduring, and popular works to date.

In January 2018, as part of Triple M's "Ozzest 100", the 'most Australian' songs of all time, "These Days" was ranked number 77. It was voted 14 in the Triple J Hottest 100 of Australian Songs.

The song was certified 3× Platinum in Australia in June 2020.

In May 2020, Thelma Plum released a cover version of the song. In a statement, Plum said "I was given the chance to record a song I grew up with, and as a Brissie local, I already know a couple of the Powderfinger guys so of course, I said yes".

On 24 October 2020, Cub Sport performed the song live at the 2020 AFL Grand Final and released a studio version of the song immediately after.

== Writing and production ==
"These Days" was developed by Powderfinger after a request by film director Gregor Jordan, who asked the band to write a song for his upcoming film, Two Hands, after showing them scenes in which the song would appear. Lead singer Bernard Fanning initially wrote the song, and it was demoed in the garage of guitarist Darren Middleton. Fanning described the process of creating the song as "the first time there was an outside reason to write a song, rather than my own emotional response to something...we saw the film so I took bits and used it without being too specific.".

The lyrics of "These Days" were similarly styled to those of other songs written by Fanning between the production of Internationalist and Odyssey Number Five, such as "Passenger" and "My Kind of Scene". The songs generally dealt with the routine and unhappiness of a "typical existence", according to Esky Magazine's Kelsey Munro. Fanning did not describe this as a conscious theme, despite it appearing in many of his songs, but agreed that the songs did discuss "having to always bow down to all of the responsibilities and obligations" of life. Fanning also told The Sun-Herald that as a result of the lyrics in "These Days" and "My Happiness" (also on Odyssey Number Five), he had been dubbed "as some sort of antipodean Mr Miserable."

== Release ==
The song was initially released by the band as the b-side to the single "Passenger", making it the first b-side to top the Triple J Hottest 100. The Two Hands soundtrack, which contained "These Days" as its lead track, was released while Powderfinger were playing their P2K tour, and when Powderfinger's album, Internationalist, was selling in bulk. With the release of "These Days" and "My Kind of Scene" on movie soundtracks - the latter appeared on the soundtrack for Mission: Impossible 2 - Powderfinger hoped to launch their overseas career. Australian reviewers stated that "...there’s a wide world out there yet to hear them, particularly "These Days". The time is right...for the band to spread their wings."

== Response ==
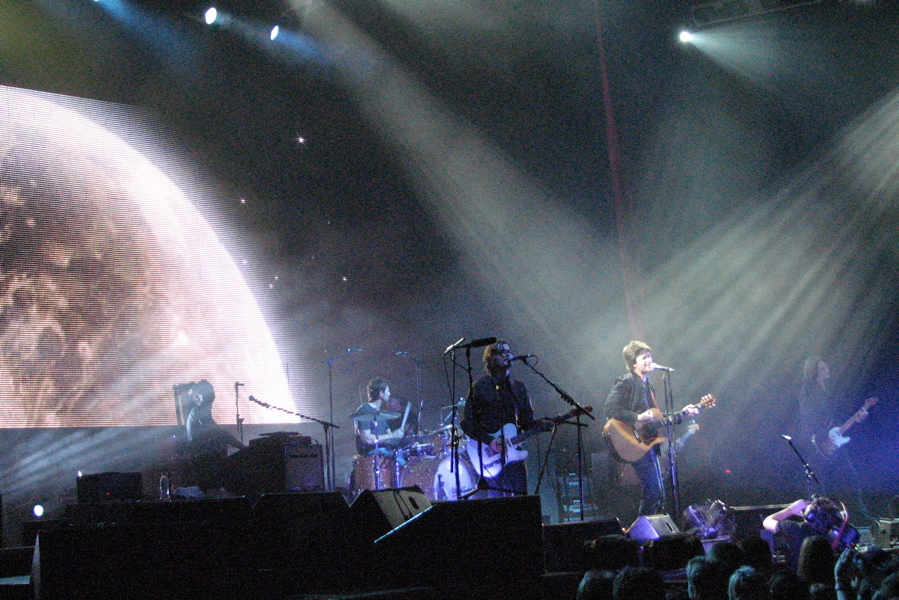
Powderfinger performing "These Days" on the Across the Great Divide tour, 8 September 2007.

"These Days" topped the Triple J Hottest 100 chart in 1999, as the result of a nationwide listener poll. The song was also awarded Song of the Year at the 2000 Music Critic's Awards. In response to the award wins, Powderfinger said they were "excited" that they were voted #1 in a listener poll. Fanning jokingly said that "We worked out that being number one on the hottest 100 makes us the biggest band in the world because it's the biggest music poll in the world", before going on to make a mockery of the band's long time antagonist, Ben Lee, by saying "we remembered we can't be the biggest band in the world because Ben Lee is the biggest in the world!" Fanning continued to publicly insult Lee, eventually calling him a "precocious little cunt" in 2005.

Fanning alone performed a sombre acoustic guitar version of the song at a live benefit concert in the days following the 2002 Bali bombings.

"These Days" was also rostered briefly on the English curriculum in some Australian high schools, something Fanning took with amazement rather than discomfort, stating that the emotional part of the song development process was the writing, rather than the performing of the song. The song was also featured on "The Hidden Toll" road trauma campaign, produced by the Victorian Transport Accident Commission, which first aired on Victorian television on 19 October 2005. Powderfinger performed "These Days" at a commemoration service for Heath Ledger, whose breakthrough film was Two Hands. "These Days" was ranked seventh in a 2008 The Weekend Australian poll for the best Australian songs of the past 20 years.

The song was voted at #21 in the Triple J Hottest 100 of All Time, 2009, where it was the second-highest placed Australian single in the countdown. The only Australian song to place higher was hip-hop song The Nosebleed Section by the Hilltop Hoods, which early in the song, contains a line from These Days, sung in hip-hop style.

The song was voted 14 in the Triple J Hottest 100 of Australian Songs.

== Music video ==
A music video was produced to promote the single.

== Alternate versions ==
"These Days"
A 19 second sample from Powderfinger's "These Days" (Two Hands version)

There are two distinct studio versions of "These Days." The first is the version used in the film Two Hands. The second version is the re-recording used on Odyssey Number Five.

=== Original version releases ===
- "Passenger" single – B-Side (1999)
- Two Hands Soundtrack – Feature song from soundtrack (1999)
- Triple J Hottest 100 – #1 (1999)
- Fingerprints: The Best of Powderfinger, 1994–2000 – (2004)

=== Odyssey Number Five release ===
- Odyssey Number Five (2000)

=== Other versions ===
- Internationalist P2K Disk – Live performance (1998)
- These Days: Live in Concert – Live performance (2004)

== Certification ==
Region	Certification	Certified units/sales
Australia (ARIA)	3× Platinum	210,000^{‡}
^{‡} Sales+streaming figures based on certification alone.
