= The Metre / Waiting for the Sun =

2001 single by Powderfinger

"The Metre" / "Waiting for the Sun"

Single by Powderfinger

from the album Odyssey Number Five
- B-side: "Number of the Beast"; "Odyssey #3"; "Whatever Makes You Happy" (piano version)
- Released: 27 August 2001
- Recorded: Sing Sing (Melbourne, Australia)
- Length: 3:54
- Label: Universal Music Australia
- Songwriters: Jon Coghill; John Collins; Bernard Fanning; Ian Haug; Darren Middleton
- Producers: Nick DiDia; Powderfinger

Powderfinger singles chronology
"Like a Dog" (2000)	"The Metre" / "Waiting for the Sun" (2001)	"(Baby I've Got You) On My Mind" (2003)

"The Metre" and "Waiting for the Sun" are two songs by Australian rock band Powderfinger from their fourth studio album, Odyssey Number Five. The songs were released as a double A-side single on 27 August 2001, serving as the album's fourth and final single. "The Metre" and "Waiting for the Sun" both had music videos produced. "Waiting for the Sun" also appeared on Powderfinger's compilation album Fingerprints: The Best of Powderfinger, 1994–2000. In the United States, "Waiting for the Sun" was serviced to rock radio three months before it was released in Australia.

Powderfinger "The Metre"
20 second sample from Powderfinger's "The Metre"

Powderfinger "Waiting for the Sun"
25 second sample from Powderfinger's "Waiting for the Sun"

== Track listing ==
Australian CD single

1. "The Metre" – 4:33 (Jon Coghill, John Collins, Bernard Fanning, Ian Haug, Darren Middleton)
2. "Waiting for the Sun" – 3:54 (Coghill, Collins, Fanning, Haug, Middleton)
3. "Number of the Beast" – 4:55 (Steve Harris)
4. "Odyssey #3" – 2:25 (Coghill, Collins, Fanning, Haug, Middleton)
5. "Whatever Makes You Happy" (piano version) – 2:27 (Fanning)

== Charts ==
Chart (2001)	Peak position
Australia (ARIA)	31

== Release history ==
Region	Version	Date	Format(s)	Label(s)	Ref.
United States	"Waiting for the Sun"	22 May 2001	Mainstream rock; active rock; alternative radio	Universal Music Australia	
Australia	"The Metre" / "Waiting for the Sun"	27 August 2001	CD	Republic; Universal	
