= Two Hands (1999 film) =

- Australian DVD cover
- Directed by: Gregor Jordan
- Written by: Gregor Jordan
- Produced by: Marian Macgowan
- Starring: Heath Ledger; Bryan Brown; Rose Byrne; David Field
- Cinematography: Malcolm McCulloch
- Edited by: Lee Smith
- Music by: Cezary Skubiszewski
- Production companies: CML; Meridian Films
- Distributed by: REP Distribution
- Release date: 29 July 1999
- Running time: 93 minutes
- Country: Australia
- Language: English
- Budget: $4.4 million
- Box office: $5.5 million

Two Hands is a 1999 Australian crime comedy film written and directed by Gregor Jordan. The film stars Heath Ledger as Jimmy, a young man in debt to Pando, a local gangster played by Bryan Brown, and also stars Rose Byrne, David Field, and Susie Porter. It won the Australian Film Institute Award for Best Film in 1999. It was screened at the 1999 Sundance Film Festival, but did not receive a theatrical release in the United States, where it was instead released straight-to-DVD by Miramax Films on 6 December 2005.

At the ARIA Music Awards of 1999 the soundtrack was nominated for Best Original Soundtrack Album.

== Plot ==
Jimmy is a nineteen-year-old who lives in a run down block of units in the inner suburbs of Sydney. He earns money by working as a barker outside a strip club in Kings Cross with his friend Les, and by partaking in underground fights. However, he aspires to follow in the footsteps of his deceased older brother, Michael, in joining the ranks of the local criminal element led by the charismatic, yet ruthless and feared mob boss, Pando.

While working one night outside the club with Les, Jimmy is approached by Pando with an offer for some work which Jimmy, enthusiastically accepts out of admiration. The same night he and Les are introduced to Alex, the sister of their friend, Rocket. Alex is visiting Sydney from the country, and forms an immediate connection with Jimmy.

The next day, Pando gives Jimmy $10,000 to deliver to a woman in Bondi, but when she appears not to be home, he decides to wait at nearby Bondi Beach. In the sweltering heat, he becomes tempted by the water and goes for a swim.

Jimmy buries the envelope containing the money in the sand, however he is unaware that he has been scoped out by two street kids named Pete and Helen who steal the cash while he is swimming, leaving him heavily indebted to the furious Pando and his gang. The street kids go on a spending spree with their newfound wealth.

The car Jimmy was using on the job — a Ford Falcon belonging to Pando's associate Acko — is stolen by a young man and taken to a mechanic with the intention of selling it. The mechanic happens to be a friend of Acko's, who, displeased at the news of his car being stolen, suspects Jimmy's involvement.

Acko arrives to recover the car but on the way there his car hits and kills Pete. Helen watches in disbelief as he simply picks the dead boy's body off the street and dumps it in the gutter, concerned more about the damage to his car. Acko drives off leaving Helen alone, crying by her dead friend.

Jimmy contacts his friend Deirdre for help. Despite her appearances as a suburban housewife, Deidre is also a part of the criminal underworld, arranging a variety of 'jobs' around Sydney, and is implied to have previously been in a relationship with Jimmy's brother. Deidre chides Jimmy over becoming involved with Pando, whom she regards with utter contempt. Jimmy, however, still greatly respects and believes him to be a "good bloke" even despite being a target for his violent retribution, and seeks to pay off his debt and make good with Pando by asking to join one of Deidre's upcoming jobs. Deidre reluctantly agrees, and sets up Jimmy for a bank robbery the next day in Bankstown along with two others; leader Wozza and getaway driver Craig.

Meanwhile Alex, staying at Rocket's unit, is visited by Les and subjected to his clumsy romantic advances despite her obvious lack of interest. His attempts are interrupted by a phone call to Alex from Jimmy, and the two make plans to meet at a pub near Chinatown. The meeting's arrangements are overheard by Les who is jealous of Alex's attraction to Jimmy and also keen to get in with Pando's gang.

At the pub, Jimmy bonds further with Alex, and he reveals to her his burgeoning doubts over his pursuit of the life of a gangster. After Les informs the gang of the couple's whereabouts, the couple are forced to flee, attempting to escape via the Sydney Monorail. Pursued by Acko and fellow gang member Wally, they are caught leaving the monorail station, and in front of a terrified Alex, Jimmy is beaten and stuffed into Pando's car. Alex returns to Rocket at his home, who is frantic over her encounter with the dangerous gangsters, and demands that for her own safety she leave town immediately.

Jimmy is driven to a remote location to be executed by Pando. To his horror, he learns that Pando is responsible for the death of his brother Michael, as Acko casually mentions that they are in almost exactly the same spot where they killed and buried him years earlier. Through the indirect intervention of Michael (who acts as a guardian angel throughout the film), Jimmy is able to escape. On his way back to Deirdre's home, he is overcome with emotion over the truth about his brother's death, but nevertheless arrives the next morning to prepare for the bank robbery.

The robbery is not without its problems. When returning with the cash bags, Wozza attempts to jump over the bank counter, but fails and lands unconscious on the bank floor. He is dragged by Jimmy and Craig into the car, and comes round just as police arrive to begin shooting and returns fire. Craig is killed by the police but the robbery is otherwise successful.

Jimmy returns to Pando's office with the $10,000 he needs, and despite again almost being killed by the gang upon his arrival, is finally able to pay off his debt. Pando is ultimately impressed by Jimmy's resolve and offers him some more work. Jimmy responds by tearfully and angrily pulling a gun on Pando before leaving in disgust, no longer drawn to him or the criminal lifestyle. As Jimmy leaves, he passes Helen, who in retaliation for the death of her friend enters the office and fatally shoots Pando, Acko and Wally, before claiming the $10,000 for herself. Alex is revealed to have stayed for Jimmy, and they buy tickets at an airport to 'The North Coast' away from the pressures of life in Sydney.

== Cast ==
- Heath Ledger as Jimmy - A naive young fighter with ambitions of becoming a gangster
- Bryan Brown as Pando - A ruthless crime lord
- David Field as Acko - Pando's right hand man
- Tom Long as Wally - A high ranking member of Pando's gang
- Steve Vidler as The Man - Jimmy's deceased brother Michael
- Dale Kalnins as Kiwi Bob - An underground boxer who Jimmy defeats
- Kiri Paramore as Les - Jimmy's friend and coworker at a strip club
- Mathew Wilkinson as Rocket - Friend of Jimmy and Les
- Rose Byrne as Alex - Rocket's sister
- Mariel McClorey as Helen (Short Haired Girl) - A street kid
- Evan Sheaves as Pete - A street kid; Helen's best friend
- Susie Porter as Deirdre - Friend of Jimmy's who arranges heists
- Steve Le Marquand as Wozza - A bank robber
- Kieran Darcy-Smith as Craig - A getaway driver; Wozza's associate
- Jerome Ehlers as Busker
- Ignatius Jones as Airline Worker

== Alternate Versions ==
Two main cuts of the film exist; both are on file at the National Film and Sound Archive of Australia.

The original cut of the film ran for 103 minutes (99 min. PAL), however, after its premiere at the Sundance Film Festival in January 1999, the director made a number of trims and cuts, particularly to scenes involving Jimmy's dead brother. Subsequently, the commonly available version of the film runs for 93 minutes (89 min. PAL) and is sometimes erroneously referred to as the "Director's Cut", despite being the version ultimately released theatrically in Australia and on home video overseas. Some German releases were also further cut for censorship reasons.

Nevertheless, the original cut of the film does occasionally surface on TV, and UK & Scandinavian VHS and DVD releases are also the longer cut.

== Soundtrack ==
The soundtrack featured the Powderfinger single "These Days," the video for which was compiled with footage from Two Hands. Other songs were mostly contributed by Australian artists. Cezary Skubiszewski also contributed original music to the soundtrack

=== Track listing ===
1. "These Days" by Powderfinger
2. "Lucky Star" by Alex Lloyd
3. "Walking Kings X" by Cezary Skubiszewski
4. "What Does it Matter" by Primary
5. "Stadium" by Skunkhour
6. "Dark State of Mind" by Tuatara
7. "Belter" by Powderfinger
8. "Staircase" by Cezary Skubiszewski
9. "Down in Splendour" by Straitjacket Fits
10. "Heavenly Sublime" by Tracky Dax
11. "Fletcher's House" by Cezary Skubiszewski
12. "Two Hands" by Kate Ceberano
13. "Love Theme" by Cezary Skubiszewski
14. "This Guy's in Love" by The Reels
15. "Kare Kare" by Crowded House

== Reception ==
The film garnered mostly positive reviews from critics, with a 86% Fresh rating on Rotten Tomatoes. Joel Meares, from FilmCritic.Com, praised director Gregor Jordan, saying, "Jordan, here in his firecracker of a debut, has created a fast moving, and ultimately genuinely moving film." Scott Weinburg, of DVDTalk.Com, stated, "Boasts Jordan's slick and efficient film making, two excellent performances by Ledger and Brown, and that always-welcome air of offbeat Aussie attitude." On its release in July 1999, many critics were calling it the "Australian Goodfellas." Pete Castaldi, from ABC.net, claimed, "Two Hands is a beautifully written and executed, fast and sexy street-wise romp through inner city villainy. Sporting the perfect cast, it's the story of innocence and the 'hardway' colliding with a mix of brutality, gentility and just a little mysticism" and praising the director, "Jordan delivers in Two Hands a tale that will more than tickle your fancy and touch your heart."

== Awards and nominations ==
AFI Awards:

- Won: Best Film
- Won: Best Director (Gregor Jordan)
- Won: Best Supporting Actor (Bryan Brown)
- Won: Best Original Screenplay (Gregor Jordan)
- Won: Best Film Editing (Lee Smith)
- Nominated: Best Achievement in Cinematography (Malcolm McCulloch)
- Nominated: Best Achievement in Costume Design (Emily Seresin)
- Nominated: Best Achievement in Sound (Lee Smith, Ross Linton, Peter Townend, Tim Jordan, Nick Breslin)
- Nominated: Best Original Music Score (Cezary Skubiszewski)
- Nominated: Best Actor (Heath Ledger)
- Nominated: Best Supporting Actress (Susie Porter)

Film Critics Circle of Australia Awards

- Won: Best Film
- Won: Best Supporting Actress (Susie Porter)
- Won: Best Supporting Actor (Bryan Brown)
- Nominated: Best Actor – Male (Heath Ledger)
- Nominated: Best Cinematography
- Nominated: Best Director (Gregor Jordan)
- Nominated: Best Music Score
- Nominated: Best Screenplay (Gregor Jordan)

Stockholm Film Festival

- Nominated: Bronze Horse (Gregor Jordan)

Queensland Premier's Literary Awards

- Won: Film Script – the Pacific Film and Television Commission Award (Gregor Jordan)

== Box office ==
Two Hands grossed $5,478,485 at the box office in Australia in 1999.

== See also ==
- Cinema of Australia
