= Bless My Soul =

Single by Powderfinger

from the album Fingerprints: The Best of Powderfinger, 1994-2000
- Released: 2004 (Australia)
- Recorded: Sing Sing Studios, Melbourne
- Genre: Rock
- Length: 4:06
- Label: Universal; Grudge
- Songwriter(s): Jon Coghill, John Collins, Bernard Fanning, Ian Haug, Darren Middleton
- Producer(s): Nick DiDia

Powderfinger singles chronology
| "Stumblin'" (2004) | "Bless My Soul" (2004) | "Lost and Running" (2007) |

"Bless My Soul" is a song from Powderfinger's first "best of" album, Fingerprints: The Best of Powderfinger, 1994-2000. The song was released a promotional single only. Although the album is described as compiling hits from 1994 to 2000, this song was recorded by the band in 2004 especially for the Fingerprints album.

The song was written whilst the band was holidaying in Spain, according to lead singer Bernard Fanning. Several lyrics of the song refer to Spain and its national flag colours of "red and gold".

In Australia, the song was ranked #9 on Triple J's Hottest 100 of 2004.

== Music video ==
The music video for "Bless My Soul" features lead singer Bernard Fanning walking along the rocks on the cliff face of a beach singing the song. The video's colour has been warped with an effect to make everything appear unnatural. These scenes are edited amongst scenes of the band playing the song.

== Audio sample ==
"Bless My Soul"
A 19 second sample from Powderfinger's "Bless My Soul"
