= The Day You Come =

Single by Powderfinger

from the album Internationalist
- Released: 10 August 1998
- Recorded: Sing Sing Studios, Melbourne
- Genre: Alternative rock
- Length: 4:01
- Label: Universal
- Songwriters: Jon Coghill, John Collins, Bernard Fanning, Ian Haug, Darren Middleton
- Producer: Nick DiDia

Powderfinger singles chronology
"Take Me In" (1997)	"The Day You Come" (1998)	"Don't Wanna Be Left Out/Good-Day Ray" (1998)

"The Day You Come" is a song from the third studio album by Powderfinger. It was released as a single on 10 August 1998 by Universal Music Group. It won the 1999 ARIA Music Award for Single of the Year.

== History ==
"The Day You Come" was the first single off Internationalist to be released, and thus gave an impression of what the album was set to contain. Lead singer Bernard Fanning said this impression was inaccurate, describing the song as being "not very up-tempo" compared to the rest of the album. He said one of the reasons the next single released was "Don't Wanna Be Left Out/Good-Day Ray" was that it was the complete opposite; a much more "thrashy" single than "The Day You Come". Guitarist Ian Haug agreed, adding that the band had not intended for "The Day You Come" to be the first single off the album, but it was released because the band couldn't decide on any other songs to release.

As well as the band's usual line-up, "The Day You Come" featured backing vocals from Brisbane trio Tiddas. This was the first time the trio worked with Powderfinger. They would also provide backing vocals on "Passenger", and on future songs including "Like a Dog" and "Thrilloilogy". "The Day You Come" also featured Nick DiDia for the first time, who would go on to be a long term producer for the band.

== Music video ==
The video for "The Day You Come" features the band along with many others at a formal gathering/party at The Tivoli in Brisbane.

== Political influences ==
"The Day You Come"
A 29-second sample from Powderfinger's "The Day You Come".

"The Day You Come" was the first Powderfinger song to contain notable political references, although the band denied attempting to "preach" through their music. Haug said the band was happy to be quoted on politics, but not to have their words preached, telling Benedict Watts: "I personally like to separate [the two] a bit [...] If someone asks us what our views are, we'll tell them, but we don't go out to our gigs and preach about things." Fanning agreed, saying, "We would never try and preach, we would only ever try and suggest things to people as possibilities.", comparing the band to Midnight Oil, especially its lead singer-turned-politician and activist, Peter Garrett. Fanning didn't rule out political messages altogether, however, but enforced the need for moderation and for not "preaching".

When the song was released, there was speculation that it alluded to Pauline Hanson's political climb; however, the band has reported that the song is more vague than specifically referring to one person, indicating that the song was not directly describing or attacking Hanson, though not ruling out that she may be one of many described. Indeed, the song's release fell within the political peak of Hanson's party, One Nation.

== Awards ==
"The Day You Come" received the ARIA Award for Single of the Year at the ARIA Music Awards of 1999 and was nominated for the APRA Award for Song of the Year, though this award was won by "Addicted to Bass" by Amiel. The song also placed as No. 8 on the Triple J Hottest 100, 1998. In May 2001, APRA, as part of its 75th Anniversary celebrations, named "The Day You Come" as one of the Top 30 Australian songs of all time.

== Track listing ==
1. "The Day You Come" – 4:01
2. "Polly" – 3:31
3. "Ironical" – 1:49
4. "John Callahan" – 3:08

== Charts ==
Chart (1998)	Peak position
Australia (ARIA)	25
