= My Kind of Scene =

2000 single by Powderfinger

Single by Powderfinger

from the album Music from and Inspired by Mission: Impossible 2 and Odyssey Number Five
- Released: 2000
- Recorded: Sing Sing Studios, Melbourne, Australia
- Genre: Rock
- Length: 4:37
- Label: Universal Music
- Songwriters: Jon Coghill, John Collins, Bernard Fanning, Ian Haug, Darren Middleton
- Producer: Nick DiDia

Powderfinger singles chronology
"Passenger" (1999)	"My Kind of Scene" (2000)	"My Happiness" (2000)

"My Kind of Scene" (also marketed as "My Kinda Scene", "Not My Kinda Scene" and "It's Not My Kinda Scene") is a song by Australian rock band Powderfinger. The song was initially written for their fourth studio album Odyssey Number Five; however, the band was requested to contribute a song to the soundtrack for the 2000 film Mission: Impossible 2. The band submitted three songs: "Whatever Makes You Happy", "Up & Down & Back Again" and "My Kind of Scene". With these submissions, Paramount Pictures decided to use "My Kind of Scene"; however, they decided to release the song as a promotional song for the film, and so changed the title to "My Kinda Scene" in Australia in fitting with the other promotional single for the film, Limp Bizkit's "Take a Look Around". The single was officially released in New Zealand where the song peaked at number 41.

The song was later featured on the intended album Odyssey Number Five. Following that, when Powderfinger released their greatest hits compilation, Fingerprints, they included the song under the original title "My Kind of Scene" and the music video was included on the promotional DVD Powderfinger's First XI along with the 2007 album Dream Days at the Hotel Existence.

The song was place #3 on Triple J Hottest 100 of 2000.

== Music video ==
The music video for "My Kind of Scene" features singer Bernard Fanning driving an old Holden Commodore along a country road with a complacent look on his face, in keeping with the lyrics of the song. As he drives, he lets go of the steering wheel after a while and eventually, the car crashes. The scene is to typify letting go of control and just letting things happen. A very similar sequence of events happens in the book Fight Club, which was made into a film of the same name the year before "My Kind of Scene" was released.

The video exemplifies the lyrics, which, as interpreted by many fans, say about their feelings of isolation. It is from a guy's perspective, someone who is not sure if he wants to accompany his friends for some activity, but would rather enjoy watching them do it.

"My Kind of Scene"
A 26 second sample from Powderfinger's "My Kind of Scene"

== Charts ==
Chart (2000)	Peak position
New Zealand (Recorded Music NZ)	41
