= Like a Dog (song) =

2001 single by Powderfinger

Single by Powderfinger

from the album Odyssey Number Five
- Released: January 2001
- Recorded: Sing Sing Studios
- Genre: Alternative rock
- Length: 4:20
- Label: Universal Music Australia
- Songwriters: Jon Coghill, John Collins, Bernard Fanning, Ian Haug, Darren Middleton
- Producers: Nick DiDia & Powderfinger

Powderfinger singles chronology
"My Happiness" (2000)	"Like a Dog" (2001)	"The Metre/Waiting for the Sun" (2001)

"Like a Dog" is a song by Australian alternative rock band Powderfinger. It was released as a single in 2001, and appeared on the band's fourth studio album, Odyssey Number Five. The song was later included on Fingerprints: The Best of Powderfinger 1994-2000.

The song's lyrics are based on the band's feelings towards Australia's political position of the time. Musically, "Like a Dog" is strongly influenced by Ian Haug (guitar and backing vocals) and his love of Iggy Pop. "Like a Dog"'s video starred Anthony Mundine in a "raging bull" type sequence. Paul Williams - "Rose Against the Odds" also makes an appearance in video.

The Paul Butler and Scott Walton directed music video was nominated for Best Video at the ARIA Music Awards of 2001.

== Track listing ==
"Like a Dog"
A 15 second sample from "Like a Dog"

1. "Like a Dog" – 4:20 (Jon Coghill, John Collins, Bernard Fanning, Ian Haug, Darren Middleton)
2. "Love My Way" – 4:36 (Richard Butler, Tim Butler, John Ashton, Vince Ely)
3. "Odyssey #2 (The Miseducation of Powderfinger)" – 3:40 (Coghill, Collins, Fanning, Haug, Middleton)

== Charts ==
Chart (2001)	Peak position
Australia (ARIA)	40
