= Passenger (Powderfinger song) =

Single by Powderfinger

from the album Internationalist
- Released: 9 August 1999 (Australia)
- Recorded: Sing Sing Studios, Melbourne
- Genre: Rock
- Length: 4:09
- Label: Universal
- Songwriter(s): Jon Coghill, John Collins, Bernard Fanning, Ian Haug, Darren Middleton

Powderfinger singles chronology
"Already Gone" (1999)	"Passenger" (1999)	"My Kind of Scene" (2000)

"Passenger" is a song from Powderfinger's third studio album Internationalist. It was released as a single on 9 August 1999, and reached #30 on the Australian music chart. The single was nominated for Single of the year in 2000 at the Australian ARIA Music Awards. "Passenger" was also featured as the opening song performed by Powderfinger while supporting Crowded House's Farewell to the World charity concert in November 1996.

== Single release and history ==
The single for "Passenger" included five companion tracks, including two live tracks. These were "Passenger" and "Pick You Up", both performed on 11 October 1998 at Sydney Opera House. A version of "These Days" was also included, and this was the first time the song was released. "Passenger" was released on 9 August 1999 in Australia, and was one of two Powderfinger songs that were actively being played on commercial radio at the time; the other being "These Days", which also appeared on the soundtrack for Two Hands. At the time, Powderfinger were performing in clubs and universities around Australia on their P2K tour, and the release of the single resulted in a large boost in ticket sales.

== Song structure ==
In "Passenger", a recurring theme in Bernard Fanning’s song writing emerged; "a fascination with the banality of routine". Esky Magazine's Kelsy Munro cited the lines "So many places you’d prefer to be / Than framed by a picket fence and salary" as an example of this, as well as examples from future songs "These Days" and "My Kind of Scene". When asked about this, Fanning offered no direct explanation, saying it wasn't a conscious theme, but did suggest that it could be a "part guilt-complex" because of his relatively care-free lifestyle.

In "Passenger", the key signature is D major, however the verses begin with the G chord, while the choruses and outro are in the D major's relative minor key, B minor. The song is a completely straight rock feel in the time signature of 4/4.

"Passenger" featured Victorian trio Tiddas for the first time, providing backing vocals. Tiddas also accompanied Powderfinger live, although some of the elements of "Passenger", such as the brass sections, were replicated using a keyboard. Powderfinger's Drummer Jon Coghill described some elements of "Passenger", including the horn section, as being based on the work of Elvis Presley, and his big band. Coghill said "We tried to do it like Elvis would, in a big band arrangement. There are backing vocals, horns and a la la sound."

== Music video ==
A scene from the video for "Passenger", showing the suitcases containing the band members before they are eaten by the whale-like creature.

Powderfinger enlisted Brisbane-based production company Fifty Fifty Films to direct and produce the music video for "Passenger". This was the group's first experience with Fifty Fifty, and its success encouraged the group to direct future videos.

The video for "Passenger" begins with the band members packing themselves and their musical instruments into suitcases. They are transported to an airport while the song's first verse is played. During the first chorus, the cases are loaded onto a baggage carousel with a bomb, whilst security personnel are distracted. The suitcases and bomb are then loaded onto an aeroplane. During the second verse, the bomb explodes, and the suitcases containing the band members fall out of it and are swallowed by an unnamed creature resembling a whale. They are later ejected from the blowhole of the creature into zero-gravity, when the second chorus commences. At the end of the chorus, the suitcases re-enter the Earth's atmosphere. The video ends with the suitcases floating in the ocean.

Carmine Pascuzzi, in an article about the band's P2K tour, wrote that "Passenger" was "...accompanied by an excellent video".

== Response ==
Powderfinger's bass guitarist, John Collins, jokingly noted in an interview with Rod Yates of Massive Magazines that "the guitars are out of tune at the start of Passenger", whilst guitarist Darren Middleton explained that "there are not regrets with any of that sort of stuff, it’s part of who we are and what we’ve done", in reference to the out of tune guitars.

Upon its release, "Passenger" was hailed as one of the songs on Internationalist to come close to "the big FM radio hits of Double Allergic", according to lead singer Bernard Fanning. Not that it mattered to him - he still believed Internationalist was a better record, but was probably not as "likable" as its predecessor. Juice's Simon Wooldridge agreed with Fanning, stating that "Passenger" "demonstrated their flair for the big hook was no longer being suppressed". On 2 August 2007, Australian television station Max published the Top 500 90s Songs, placing "Passenger" as the only Powderfinger song in the top 100, at #48, just ahead of Fatboy Slim's "Praise You".

== Charts ==
Chart (1999)	Peak position
Australia (ARIA)	30

== Awards ==
As the final single from Internationalist, "Passenger" received nominations and awards from various institutions Australia-wide. Most notably, it was nominated three times by the Australian Recording Industry Association in 2000 for the ARIA Music Awards for Best Cover Art, Single of the Year and earned Powderfinger the nomination for Best Group, though won none of these awards. The song was also nominated and did win the award for Song of the Year from the Australasian Performing Right Association for their annual APRA Awards. The song also achieved the 100th position on the 1999 Triple J Hottest 100.

Year	Organisation	Ceremony	Award	Result
1999	Triple J	Hottest 100	N/A	#100
2000	APRA	APRA Awards	Song of the Year	Won
2000	ARIA	ARIA Music Awards	Best Cover Art	Nominated
2000	ARIA	ARIA Music Awards	Best Group	Nominated
2000	ARIA	ARIA Music Awards	Single of the Year	Nominated

== Track listing ==
Powderfinger "Passenger"
20 second sample from Powderfinger's "Passenger"

All tracks written and performed by Powderfinger.

1. "Passenger" – 4:09
2. "These Days" – 4:59
3. "Passenger (Live)" – 4:41
4. "Pick You Up (Live)" – 4:47
5. "Maxwell's Great Mistake" – 2:58
6. "That Ol' Track" – 3:47
