= Powderfinger discography =

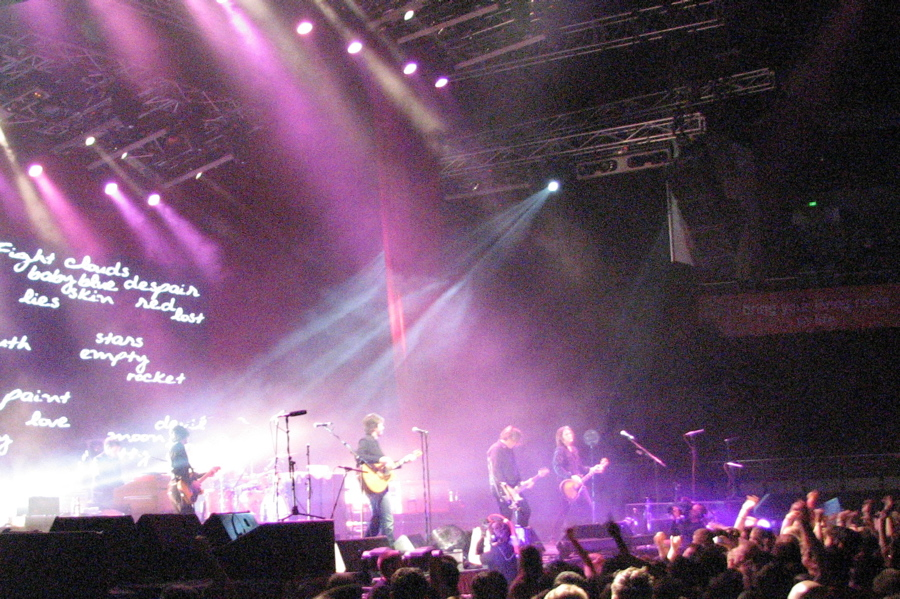
- Powderfinger performing at the Across the Great Divide tour with Silverchair in September 2007.
- Studio albums: 7
- Extended plays: 6
- Live albums: 3
- Compilation albums: 4
- Singles: 33
- Video albums: 1
- Music videos: 29

The discography of Powderfinger, an Australian alternative rock group, consists of seven studio albums, thirty-three singles, six extended plays, three live albums, four compilation albums, one video album and twenty-nine music videos. They have been nominated for forty-nine ARIA Music Awards, of which they have won eighteen. Shortly after the independent release of their debut self-titled EP in 1993, Powderfinger signed on to a major record label to release their second EP, Transfusion. In 1994 they issued their debut album Parables for Wooden Ears, which did not reach the ARIA Albums Chart. After performances at music festivals, touring and supporting international artists, Powderfinger released their second studio album, Double Allergic (1996), which became their charting breakthrough by peaking at No. 4. Following public recognition from the album's high-selling singles, Powderfinger went on to release Internationalist in 1998, which was their first number-one album; it was certified five times platinum by ARIA for shipment of 350,000 copies.

In September 2000, the group released their fourth album, Odyssey Number Five, which also reached number one; it was certified eight times platinum for shipment of 560,000 copies. Two of the album's songs, "These Days" and "My Kinda Scene" were released on the soundtracks for Two Hands (1999), and Mission: Impossible 2 (2000). Their fifth album, Vulture Street, was released in 2003, and became their third number-one album; it was six times platinum for 420,000 copies. In 2004, the group released their first greatest hits album composed of tracks from their early recording era, Fingerprints: The Best of Powderfinger, 1994–2000. Weeks later, the group released their first live album, which also appeared in DVD form. The group then had a hiatus to allow its members to pursue various side projects. After two years, the band regrouped and released their sixth studio album, Dream Days at the Hotel Existence in 2007, and Golden Rule in 2009. Golden Rule became their fifth studio album in a row which reached number-one. On 13 November 2010 Powderfinger performed for the last time. In November 2011, the group issued a second greatest hits album, Footprints: The Best of Powderfinger, 2001–2011.

In May 2020, the group reformed for a one-off livestreamed charity performance titled One Night Lonely. An EP of the performance released on 25 May 2020.

== Albums ==
=== Studio albums ===
List of studio albums, with selected chart positions and certifications
Title	Album details	Peak chart positions		Certifications (sales thresholds)
Title	Album details	AUS	NZ	Certifications (sales thresholds)
Parables for Wooden Ears	Released: 18 July 1994; Label: Polydor; Formats: CD	36 (Note: Parables for Wooden Ears originally peaked at number 51 in 1994. Its 30th anniversary edition reached number 36 in 2024.)	—	
Double Allergic	Released: 2 September 1996; Label: Polydor (533 153-2); Formats: CD	4	—	ARIA: 3× Platinum
Internationalist	Released: 7 September 1998; Label: Polydor (547 795-2); Formats: CD	1	—	ARIA: 5× Platinum
Odyssey Number Five	Released: 4 September 2000; Label: Grudge (5490922); Formats: CD	1	15	ARIA: 8× Platinum
Vulture Street	Released: 4 July 2003; Label: Universal (038 353-2); Formats: CD	1	17	ARIA: 6× Platinum
Dream Days at the Hotel Existence	Released: 2 June 2007; Label: Universal (1735251); Formats: CD	1	26	ARIA: 3× Platinum
Golden Rule	Released: 13 November 2009; Label: Universal; Formats: CD	1	—	ARIA: 2× Platinum
"—" denotes a recording that did not chart or was not released in that territory.

=== Live albums ===
List of live albums, with selected chart positions and certifications
Title	Album details	Peak chart positions	Certifications
Title	Album details	AUS	Certifications
These Days: Live in Concert	Released: 6 September 2004; Label: Universal; Formats: CD (audio), DVD	2	ARIA: Gold (for CD); ARIA: 2× Platinum (for DVD)
Across the Great Divide Tour	Released: 1 December 2007; Note: Shared release with Silverchair; Label: Universal; Formats: DVD	2	ARIA: 2× Platinum
Sunsets Farewell Tour	Released: 3 December 2010; Label: Universal; Formats: 2× DVD	1	ARIA: 5× Platinum

=== Compilation albums ===
List of compilation albums, with selected chart positions and certifications
Title	Album details	Peak chart positions	Certifications (sales thresholds)
Title	Album details	AUS	Certifications (sales thresholds)
Fingerprints: The Best of Powderfinger, 1994–2000	Released: 30 October 2004; Label: Universal; Format: CD	2	ARIA: 2× Platinum
Footprints: The Best of Powderfinger, 2001–2011	Released: 8 November 2011^{[A]}; Label: Universal; Format: CD	22	ARIA: Gold
Fingerprints & Footprints: Ultimate Collection	Released: 8 November 2011^{[A]}; Label: Universal; Format: 2× CD	15	
Unreleased (1998–2010)	Released: 27 November 2020; Label: Universal; Format: CD, CD, LP, streaming	2	

Notes

- A. Footprints: The Best of Powderfinger 2001–2011 was released simultaneously with Fingerprints & Footprints: Ultimate Collection, which features both "best of" albums. Each appeared on the ARIA Albums Chart Top 50 over the same eight weeks

=== Box sets ===
List of box sets
Title	Album details
Seven Deadly Spins	Released: 22 December 2009; Label: Universal 0602527280387; Format: 7× Vinyl album, 7× CD; Note: Box set of seven studio albums

== Extended plays ==
List of extended plays, with selected chart positions
Title	Details	Peak chart positions
Title	Details	AUS
Powderfinger	Released: 1992; Label: Independent; Formats: CD	—
Transfusion	Released: 1993; Label: Polydor; Formats: CD; Re-released in 2020 as Digital download, streaming	—
Mr Kneebone	Released: 1995; Label: Polydor; Formats: CD, Re-released in 2020 as Digital download, streaming	83
The Triple M Acoustic Sessions	Released: 1999; Label: Triple M; Formats: CD limited edition: only 400 copies were made	—
iTunes Live from Sydney	Released: 2008; Label: Universal; Formats: Digital download	58
One Night Lonely	Released: 25 May 2020; Label: Universal; Formats: Digital download, streaming; Released on 21 May 2021 as a limited edition LP	4
"—" denotes a recording that did not chart in that territory.

=== Videos ===
List of video albums
Title	Album details
Take Me In	Released: 1997; Label: Polydor; Formats: VHS
Odyssey Number Five (The Story Behind the Album)	Released: October 2008; Label: SBS, Madman; Formats: DVD

== Singles ==
List of singles, with selected chart positions and certifications, showing year released and album name
Title	Year	Peak chart positions		Certifications	Album
Title	Year	AUS	NZ	Certifications	Album
"Tail"	1994	118	—		Parables for Wooden Ears
"Grave Concern"	1994	—	—		Parables for Wooden Ears
"Save Your Skin"	1995	—	—		Parables for Wooden Ears
"Pick You Up"	1996	23	—		Double Allergic
"D.A.F."	1996	39	—		Double Allergic
"Living Type"	1996	42	—		Double Allergic
"Take Me In"	1997	91	—		Double Allergic
"The Day You Come"	1998	25	—		Internationalist
"Don't Wanna Be Left Out"/"Good-Day Ray"	1998	59	—		Internationalist
"Already Gone"	1999	68	—		Internationalist
"Passenger"	1999	30	—		Internationalist
"My Kind of Scene"	2000	—N/a	41		Odyssey Number Five
"My Happiness"	2000	4	7	ARIA: 7× Platinum; RMNZ: 2× Platinum	Odyssey Number Five
"Like a Dog"	2001	40	—		Odyssey Number Five
"The Metre/Waiting for the Sun"	2001	31	—		Odyssey Number Five
"(Baby I've Got You) On My Mind"	2003	9	—	RMNZ: Gold	Vulture Street
"Love Your Way"	2003	37	—		Vulture Street
"Sunsets"	2004	11	38	RMNZ: Gold	Vulture Street
"Since You've Been Gone"	2004	51	—		Vulture Street
"Stumblin'"	2004	—N/a	—		These Days: Live in Concert
"Bless My Soul"	2004	—N/a	—		Fingerprints: The Best of Powderfinger, 1994–2000
"Lost and Running"	2007	5	—		Dream Days at the Hotel Existence
"I Don't Remember"	2007	42	—		Dream Days at the Hotel Existence
"Nobody Sees"	2007	51	—		Dream Days at the Hotel Existence
"Who Really Cares (Featuring the Sound of Insanity)"	2008	—	—		Dream Days at the Hotel Existence
"All of the Dreamers"	2009	23	—		Golden Rule
"Burn Your Name"	2009	45	—	ARIA: Gold	Golden Rule
"Sail the Wildest Stretch"	2010	67	—		Golden Rule
"Iberian Dream"	2010	—	—		Golden Rule
"I'm on Your Side" (for 2011 Floods Relief)	2011	88	—		Non-album single
“Empty Space"	2011	—	—		Non-album single
"Day by Day"	2020	—	—		Unreleased (1998–2010)
"Daybreak"	2020	—	—		Unreleased (1998–2010)
"—" denotes a recording that did not chart or was not released in that territory.

=== Other charted and certified songs ===
List of other charted songs, with selected chart positions and certifications
Title	Year	Chart positions	Certifications	Album
Title	Year	AUS	Certifications	Album
"These Days"	1999	—N/a	ARIA: 3× Platinum; RMNZ: Gold	Two Hands (Original Motion Picture Soundtrack)
"One More Kiss as You Fly Away"	2008	81		B-side of "Who Really Cares (Featuring the Sound of Insanity)"

== Other appearances ==
List of other appearances, showing year released and album name
Title	Year	Album
"Freeze"	1998	Homebake 98
"The Chauffeur"	1999	UnDone – The Songs of Duran Duran
"Sorrow"	2001	Andrew Denton's Musical Challenge 2
"Bless My Soul", "My Happiness", "Passenger", "These Days", "On My Mind"	2005	WaveAid
"Glory Box"	2007	No Man's Woman: A Tribute to Women in Voice

== Music videos ==
The first eight of Powderfinger's music videos were directed by David Barker. The group then collaborated with several production companies, including working with Fifty Fifty Films' Scott Walton from 1999.

List of music videos, showing year released and director
Title	Year	Director(s)
"Reap What You Sow"	1993	David Barker
"Tail"	1994	David Barker
"Grave Concern"	1994	David Barker
"Pick You Up"	1996	David Barker
"D.A.F."	1996	David Barker
"Living Type"	1997	David Barker
"Take Me In"	1997	David Barker
"The Day You Come"	1998	David Barker
"Don't Wanna Be Left Out"	1998	Mark Hartley
"Good Day Ray"	1998	Mark Hartley
"Already Gone"	1998	Mark Hartley
"Passenger"	1999	Scott Walton
"These Days" piano version	1999	Gregor Jordan
"My Kind of Scene"	2000	Scott Walton
"My Happiness"	2000	Chris Applebaum
"Like a Dog"	2000	Paul Butler, Scott Walton
"The Metre"	2000	Scott Walton
"Waiting for the Sun"	2000	Scott Walton
"(Baby I've Got You) On My Mind"	2003	Scott Walton
"Love Your Way"	2003	Scott Walton
"Sunsets"	2004	Liquid Animation (Michael Viner, Horst Viola Jr, Sorin Oancea, Matt Meersbergen)
"Stumblin'"	2004	Gregor Jordan
"Bless My Soul"	2004	Scot Walton
"Lost and Running"	2007	Damon Escott, Stephen Lance
"I Don't Remember"	2007	Scott Walton
"Nobody Sees"	2007	Damon Escott, Stephen Lance
"All of the Dreamers"	2009	Damon Escott
"Burn Your Name"	2009	Natasha Pincus
"Sail the Wildest Stretch"	2010	Scott Walton
"Empty Space"	2011	
"Day by Day"	2020	Jeremy Hancock

== See also ==
- List of awards and nominations received by Powderfinger
