= Fingerprints & Footprints =

Fingerprints & Footprints: The Ultimate Collection

Greatest hits album by Powderfinger
- Released: 5 November 2011 (Australia)
- Recorded: Various
- Genre: Alternative rock
- Label: Universal Music Australia

Powderfinger chronology
Footprints: The Best of Powderfinger, 2001-2011 (2011)	Fingerprints & Footprints: The Ultimate Collection (2011)	One Night Lonely (2020)

Fingerprints & Footprints: The Ultimate Collection is a double greatest hits album by Australian alternative rock band Powderfinger, released on 5 November 2011 in Australia. The album contains two greatest hits albums, the previously released Fingerprints: The Best of Powderfinger, 1994–2000 and the then-new Footprints: The Best of Powderfinger, 2001-2011

== Track listing ==
CD 1 Fingerprints
No.	Title	Album	Length
1.	"Bless My Soul"	Previously unreleased	4:06
2.	"My Happiness"	Odyssey Number Five	4:36
3.	"Waiting for the Sun"	Odyssey Number Five	3:54
4.	"Pick You Up"	Double Allergic	4:19
5.	"Passenger"	Internationalist	4:20
6.	"Don't Wanna Be Left Out"	Internationalist	2:16
7.	"These Days"	Two Hands soundtrack	4:30
8.	"The Day You Come"	Internationalist	3:58
9.	"D.A.F."	Double Allergic	3:30
10.	"My Kind of Scene"	Odyssey Number Five	4:37
11.	"Like a Dog"	Odyssey Number Five	4:20
12.	"Already Gone"	Internationalist	3:28
13.	"Process This"	Previously unreleased	3:22
14.	"Belter"	Internationalist	4:13
15.	"Living Type"	Double Allergic	3:25
16.	"Thrilloilogy"	Odyssey Number Five	6:10
17.	"Sink Low"	Parables for Wooden Ears	2:12

CD 2 Footprints
No.	Title	Album	Length
1.	"Empty Space"	Previously unreleased	4:27
2.	"(Baby I've Got You) On My Mind"	Vulture Street	3:21
3.	"Burn Your Name"	Golden Rule	3:52
4.	"Sunsets"	Vulture Street	3:50
5.	"Lost and Running"	Dream Days at the Hotel Existence	3:41
6.	"Nobody Sees"	Dream Days at the Hotel Existence	4:14
7.	"Love Your Way"	Vulture Street	4:30
8.	"Since You've Been Gone"	Vulture Street	4:12
9.	"I Don't Remember"	Dream Days at the Hotel Existence	3:40
10.	"A Fight About Money"	Golden Rule	5:09
11.	"Who Really Cares (Featuring the Sound of Insanity)"	Dream Days at the Hotel Existence	5:12
12.	"Sail the Wildest Stretch" (Michael Brauer Radio Mix)	Golden Rule	3:38
13.	"Head Up In the Clouds"	Dream Days at the Hotel Existence	3:46
14.	"I'm On Your Side"	Flood Appeal single, 2011	4:20
15.	"All of the Dreamers"	Golden Rule	3:37
16.	"Stumblin'"	Vulture Street	3:47
17.	"Silver Bullet"	Previously unreleased	4:29
18.	"Poison In Your Mind"	Golden Rule	2:44

== Charts ==
=== Weekly charts ===
Chart (2011–12)	Peak position
Australian Albums (ARIA)	15

=== Year-end charts ===
Chart (2011)	Position
Australian Artist Albums Chart	23
