= Footprints: The Best of Powderfinger, 2001–2011 =

Greatest hits album by Powderfinger
- Released: 5 November 2011
- Recorded: Various
- Genre: Alternative rock
- Label: Universal Music Australia

Powderfinger chronology
Golden Rule (2009)	Footprints: The Best of Powderfinger, 2001–2011 (2011)	Fingerprints & Footprints: The Ultimate Collection (2011)

Singles from Footprints: The Best of Powderfinger, 2001–2011
- 1. "Empty Space" Released: 2011

Footprints: The Best of Powderfinger, 2001–2011 is the second greatest hits album by Australian alternative rock band Powderfinger, released on 5 November 2011 in Australia.

The album contained tracks from Powderfinger's last three albums, as well as the single "I'm On Your Side", which was released in 2010 for the Flood Relief, and two previously unreleased songs, "Empty Space" and "Silver Bullet".

"Empty Space" was released to radio on 10 October and a music video released later on 18 October.

== Background ==
The compilation was first announced on 22 June 2011 in an article announcing the release of the band's first authorised biography. It was revisited in greater detail on 7 October, when the band released a trailer of the biography on their website.

== Track listing ==
Standard album
No.	Title	Album	Length
1.	"Empty Space"	Previously unreleased	4:27
2.	"(Baby I've Got You) On My Mind"	Vulture Street	3:21
3.	"Burn Your Name"	Golden Rule	3:52
4.	"Sunsets"	Vulture Street	3:50
5.	"Lost and Running"	Dream Days at the Hotel Existence	3:41
6.	"Nobody Sees"	Dream Days at the Hotel Existence	4:14
7.	"Love Your Way"	Vulture Street	4:30
8.	"Since You've Been Gone"	Vulture Street	4:12
9.	"I Don't Remember"	Dream Days at the Hotel Existence	3:40
10.	"A Fight About Money"	Golden Rule	5:09
11.	"Who Really Cares (Featuring the Sound of Insanity)"	Dream Days at the Hotel Existence	5:12
12.	"Sail the Wildest Stretch" (Michael Brauer Radio Mix)	Golden Rule	3:38
13.	"Head Up In the Clouds"	Dream Days at the Hotel Existence	3:46
14.	"I'm On Your Side"	Flood Appeal single, 2011	4:20
15.	"All of the Dreamers"	Golden Rule	3:37
16.	"Stumblin'"	Vulture Street	3:47
17.	"Silver Bullet"	Previously unreleased	4:29
18.	"Poison In Your Mind"	Golden Rule	2:44

== Charts ==
Chart (2011–12)	Peak position
Australian Albums (ARIA)	23

=== Year-end charts ===
Chart (2011)	Position
Australian Artist Albums Chart	23

== Certifications ==
Region	Certification	Certified units/sales
Australia (ARIA)	Gold	35,000^{^}
^{^} Shipments figures based on certification alone.
