= These Days: Live in Concert =

Video by Powderfinger
- Released: 6 September 2004 (Australia CD), 4 October 2004 (DVD)
- Recorded: Sydney Entertainment Centre, 12–13 December 2003 (disc one); Fox Studios, Sydney, 18 December 2003 (disc two)
- Genre: Rock
- Label: Universal Music Group
- Director: Gregor Jordan, Bernie Zelvis
- Producer: Paul Piticco, Paul Butler, Ben Richardson, Stuart Subotic

Powderfinger chronology
| Take Me In (1997) | These Days: Live in Concert (2004) | Across the Great Divide Tour (2007) |

Singles from These Days: Live in Concert
- 1. "Stumblin'" Released: 2004

Professional ratings
Review scores
| Source | Rating |
|---|---|
| Messenger | 2004 |

These Days: Live in Concert is a live album by Australian alternative rock band Powderfinger, released as a CD on 6 September 2004, and as a two disc DVD on 4 October 2004.

The album consists of songs performed by Powderfinger in concerts at Sydney Entertainment Centre, and Fox Studios in Sydney. Most of the songs performed are from Powderfinger's prior studio album; Vulture Street. These Days: Live in Concert earned a mixed response from reviewers; some enjoyed the energy and flair of the live performances, while others disliked the lack of dynamism.

== Production ==
These Days: Live in Concert disc one was directed by Gregor Jordan, who the band had first encountered when he requested they write "These Days" for his film Two Hands. Bernard Fanning also worked with Jordan on the film Ned Kelly in 2003. The band chose Jordan because they did not want to present These Days: Live in Concert as "just straight-up live concert footage", but instead wanted to present it from a different angle. Jordan agreed, and believed that the band being a successful rock group from Brisbane was an interesting angle to work from.

Disc one of These Days: Live in Concert was recorded by Powderfinger during sellout performances at Sydney Entertainment Centre, and featured live performances of 14 songs, including nine singles. The footage on the disc was shot over two nights. Disc two "low key" was directed by Bernie Zelvis of Channel V, and was recorded at Sydney's Fox Studios. The disc contained mostly acoustic performances by the band, and included a cover of "Inner City Blues" by Rodriguez.

The band's live performances at large venues such as the Sydney Entertainment Centre was criticised by some fans, as the band had previously stated they disliked playing to large crowds. Drummer Jon Coghill said he was not bothered by the comments, as the band (other than guitarist Ian Haug) generally did not take much note of such critique.

== Release and response ==
These Days: Live in Concert was released as a CD on 6 September 2004, through the record label Universal Music Australia . Only 40,000 copies of the CD were initially created. Meanwhile, the DVD version was released on 4 October 2004. "Stumblin'", the first and only single from the album, was released on 6 June 2004, but failed to chart.

These Days: Live in Concert entered the ARIA charts at #2 19 September 2004, and spent a total of 8 weeks in the chart, exiting on 7 November 2004. The CD version was certified "Gold" by ARIA, while the DVD version was certified "Double Platinum" in the same year.

These Days: Live in Concert received a mixed response from reviewers. Sputnikmusic reviewer James Bishop approved of the album, giving it a score of 4/5, and summarising "Powderfinger deliver a live show that's as entertaining as it is surprising". Bishop praised numerous performances on disc one, calling "Rockin' Rocks" "a great introduction to their arena spectacular", describing the almost instrument-free performance of "These Days" as "one of the most heart-wrenching moments they’ve ever recorded", and calling "Thrilloilogy" "the quintessential live Powderfinger track". Bishop also enjoyed disc two, lauding the acoustic performances of "Sunsets" and "Love Your Way", and describing b-side "Rita" as "an absolute hit as usual".

Jeff Crawford, of Adelaide newspaper The Messenger disagreed with Bishop, giving the album three stars, and stating "Gregor Jordan's concert film makes the most of Powderfinger's strengths but can't disguise their lack of dynamism, while the interviews are hardly insightful". He called Fanning's solo on "These Days" the highlight of the album.

== Personnel ==
=== Powderfinger ===
- Bernard Fanning
- Darren Middleton
- Ian Haug
- John Collins
- Jon Coghill

=== Production Disc One ===
- Paul Piticco - Executive producer
- Paul Butler - Producer
- Gregor Jordan - Director
- Luke Doolan - Film editing
- Remote Recorders - Audio Recording

=== Production Disc Two ===
- Ben Richardson - Producer
- Stuart Subotic -Producer
- Bernie Zelvis - Director
- Remote Recorders - Audio Recording

== Track listing ==
=== Disc One – Live on Vulture Street ===
These Days (Live in Concert) Powderfinger

1. "Rockin' Rocks"
2. "Waiting for the Sun"
3. "Love Your Way"
4. "Since You've Been Gone"
5. "Thrilloilogy".
6. "My Kind of Scene"
7. "Stumblin'"
8. "These Days"
9. "Rita"
10. "Pockets"
11. "Passenger"
12. "Like a Dog"
13. "My Happiness"
14. "On My Mind"

=== Disc Two – Low Key ===
1. "Love Your Way"
2. "Since You've Been Gone"
3. "Waiting for the Sun"
4. "A Song Called Everything"
5. "Sunsets"
6. "How Far Have We Really Come?"
7. "Rita"
8. "Inner City Blues"
9. "(Baby I've Got You) On My Mind"

== Certifications ==
| Region | Certification | Certified units/sales |
|---|---|---|
| Australia (ARIA) | 2× Platinum | 30,000^{^} |
^{^} Shipments figures based on certification alone.

== See also ==
- Powderfinger albums
- Full discography
