= Sunsets (video) =

Video by Powderfinger
- Released: 12 January 2004
- Recorded: 2003
- Studio: Studios 301 (Sydney)
- Genre: Rock
- Label: Universal
- Director: Liquid Animation, Brisbane
- Producer: Liquid Animation, Brisbane

Powderfinger chronology
Sunsets (2004)	These Days: Live in Concert (2004)

Sunsets is a five-track DVD single released in January 2004 by Australian rock group, Powderfinger. It was the band's first DVD release, which appeared on Universal Music Australia. For their career, the track, "Sunsets", was issued as the band's seventeenth single. The DVD's lead track features a fully animated video which, as a first for Powderfinger, did not have any image of the band at all. It was directed and produced by Liquid Animation in Brisbane, which consists of Michael Viner, Horst Viola Jr, Sorin Oancea and Matt Meersbergen. The other four tracks were produced and directed by Fifty Fifty Films.

== Track listing ==
Catalogue number: UMA 9813658

1. "Sunsets" (animated video)
2. "Sunsets" (live acoustic video)
3. "Rita" (live video)
4. "On My Mind" (music video)
5. "Love Your Way" (music video)
