= One Night Lonely =

2020 EP by Powderfinger

EP by Powderfinger
- Released: 25 May 2020
- Recorded: 2020
- Venue: Various
- Length: 31:57
- Label: Warner

Powderfinger chronology
Fingerprints & Footprints (2011)	One Night Lonely (2020)	Unreleased (1998–2010) (2020)

One Night Lonely is an EP recorded by the Australian rock band Powderfinger in 2020. It was released on 25 May 2020 following a charity performance raising money for Support Act and mental health organisation Beyond Blue. The band had a goal of raising $500,000 Australian dollars. On 26 May, the band confirmed it had raised more than $460,000. On 28 May 2020, it was confirmed the performance had almost reached its goal.

On its one-year anniversary, the album was released on vinyl, limited to 2,305 copies.

== Background and release ==
The performance was the band's first in a decade and was months in the making. The former bandmates had been meeting regularly to discuss a twentieth-anniversary release of their ARIA Award-winning album Odyssey Number 5; however plans were affected by the COVID-19 pandemic.

On 14 May 2020, the band announced a one-off reunion via their social media, saying "Powderfinger are getting back together for one night only to give you an exclusive YouTube performance straight from our home studios to your living room titled One Night Lonely. So let’s come together for a good cause to raise funds for Support Act and Beyond Blue. Put it in your diaries people and sign up on the Powderfinger website to find out how to watch!"

In a statement, the band said "The idea came up of playing together again in this unusual format which we all thought would be fun. The past few months has been a very strange time for us all and difficult days for many. We really just want to bring a smile to some people's faces and along the way raise some funds to help our music industry mates and people who are currently experiencing mental health issues."

The set was captured from the band members' homes (except for bassist John Collins, on stage of his empty, 3,000-capacity Fortitude Music Hall). The recording was filmed some weeks before the live stream, and post-production edited it together and presented it as a near 40-minute package. It was released at 7pm on 23 May 2020, with close to 100,000 people watching the stream as it happened.

== Reception ==
Andrew Stafford from The Guardian gave the performance 4 out of 5, writing that despite the distance "what was most immediately apparent was how tight they sounded. It was hard to believe Powderfinger were not playing in the same room; indeed, if you closed your eyes you could easily have been playing one of their albums."

== Track listing ==
1. "Bless My Soul" – 4:34
2. "Sunsets" – 3:49
3. "My Happiness" – 4:38
4. "On My Mind" – 3:17
5. "Already Gone" – 3:33
6. "Thrilloilogy" – 6:55
7. "These Days" – 5:11

== Charts ==
The EP debuted at number 79 for the week commencing 8 June 2020. It peaked at number 4 following its vinyl release in 2021.

Chart performance for One Night Lonely
Chart (2020–2021)	Peak position
Australian Albums (ARIA)	4
