= Create/Control =

Australian independent record label

- Founder: Paul Piticco
- Genre: Various
- Country of origin: Australia
- Location: Brisbane, Queensland

Create/Control is an independent record label based in Brisbane and Sydney, Australia. Create/Control was founded by Paul Piticco.

== Operational ==
Create/Control is a record label for artists who have the ability to create their own recordings without label funding who will then use the label for distribution, promotion and marketing. Artists signed to the Create/Control label own 100% ownership and copyright of their work.

In 2013 Create/Control partnered with record labels from Canada and the United States to release each other's recordings.

== Discography ==
Create/Control's roster includes a variety of bands from outside Australia, including The Smashing Pumpkins, Metric, California Wives and Parquet Courts as well as a number of Australian artists including PVT, The Jungle Giants, Gung Ho and Patrick James.

- The Smashing Pumpkins – Oceania
- PVT – Homosapien
- Metric – Synthetica
- Ultraísta – Ultraista
- The Jungle Giants – She's a Riot EP
- Opossom – Electric Hawaii
- California Wives – Art History
- Gung Ho – Anywhere Else EP
- Velociraptor – The World Warriors
- The Chemist – Ballet in the Badlands
- Patrick James – All About to Change EP
