= Take Me In =

Take Me In may refer to:

- "Take Me In" (Powderfinger song), 1997
- "Take Me In" (Bonnie Pink song), 2001
- "Take Me In", a song by Kutless from the album Strong Tower
