= Heartspark Dollarsign =

1996 single by Everclear

Single by Everclear

from the album Sparkle and Fade
- B-side: "Queen of the Air"; 1. "Heroin Girl" (acoustic); 2. "Happy Hour" (demo); 3. "Sin City"
- Released: March 26, 1996
- Genre: Alternative rock
- Length: 2:53
- Label: Capitol
- Songwriters: Greg Eklund; Craig Montoya; Art Alexakis
- Producer: Art Alexakis

Everclear singles chronology
"Santa Monica" (1995)	"Heartspark Dollarsign" (1996)	"You Make Me Feel Like a Whore" (1996)

Music video
- "Heartspark Dollarsign" on YouTube

"Heartspark Dollarsign" is the third single released from American rock band Everclear's second studio album, Sparkle and Fade. Lead singer Art Alexakis wrote the song before Everclear formed, while he was in the band Colorfinger. The song was then recorded by Everclear and included on Sparkle and Fade, which was released in May 1995. The lyrics describe an interracial relationship, something Alexakis often experienced in his youth.

"Heartspark Dollarsign" was released as a single on March 26, 1996, and reached the top 50 in Australia and the United Kingdom. In the United States, the single became Everclear's first song to chart on the Billboard Hot 100, peaking at number 85 in June 1996, and it also reached number 13 on the Billboard Modern Rock Tracks chart and number 29 on the Billboard Mainstream Rock Tracks chart. In Canada, the song peaked at number 12 on the RPM Alternative 30.

== Background and lyrics ==
Everclear lead singer Art Alexakis explained during an interview with Spin magazine that he first wrote and performed the song—originally titled "Colorblind"—while he was working with his third music project, Colorfinger, but it did not appear on their sole album, Deep in the Heart of the Beast in the Sun. Alexakis explained the song is "just embracing the value of love and passion — your heart."

The lyrics of the song describe an interracial relationship that no one approves. In the Spin interview, Alexakis revealed that when he was young, he dated women of many races, including black women, Asian women, and a Jewish girl. One of his relationships with a black woman did not earn the approval from either of their mothers, and both adolescents were too young to stand up for their relationship, which ended about three weeks after it started.

== Chart performance ==
On the US Billboard Hot 100, "Heartspark Dollarsign" debuted at number 92 on the week dated May 18, 1996. Four weeks later, on June 8, it reached its peak of number 85, and it dropped off the Hot 100 from number 98 on July 6. Additionally, the single peaked at number 13 on the Modern Rock Tracks chart and number 29 on the Mainstream Rock Tracks chart. It was also an alternative hit in Canada, debuting at number 29 on the RPM Alternative 30 on May 18, then reaching its peak of number 12 five weeks later, on June 17.

Outside North America, the song managed to reach the top 50 in the United Kingdom and Australia. In the former country, "Heartspark Dollarsign" was released before "Santa Monica", becoming Everclear's first single to chart in the UK. It debuted and peaked at number 48 on the UK Singles Chart on May 26, dropped to number 75 the following week, then left the top 100 on June 9. In Australia, the song debuted at number 40–its peak position–and stayed in the top 50 for two more weeks.

== Track listings ==
US maxi-CD single

1. "Heartspark Dollarsign" (single mix)
2. "Heroin Girl" (acoustic version)
3. "Happy Hour" (demo)
4. "Sin City"

UK 7-inch single

A. "Heartspark Dollarsign" (single mix)
B. "Loser Makes Good" (live)

UK CD1

1. "Heartspark Dollarsign" (single mix) – 2:54
2. "Pennsylvania Is..." (live) – 2:11
3. "Nervous and Weird" (live) – 2:55

UK CD2

1. "Heartspark Dollarsign" (album version) – 2:53
2. "Loser Makes Good" (live) – 2:49
3. "Sparkle" (live) – 3:20

Australian and Dutch maxi-CD single

1. "Heartspark Dollarsign" (single edit)
2. "Pennsylvania Is..." (live—radio session)
3. "Loser Makes Good" (live—radio session)
4. "Sparkle" (live—radio session)

== Charts ==
=== Weekly charts ===
Chart (1996)	Peak position
Australia (ARIA)	40
Canada Rock/Alternative (RPM)	12
Europe (Eurochart Hot 100)	93
Scottish Singles Sales (Official Charts)	59
UK Singles (Official Charts)	48
US Billboard Hot 100	85
US Alternative Airplay (Billboard)	13
US Mainstream Rock (Billboard)	29

=== Year-end charts ===
Chart (1996)	Position
US Modern Rock Tracks (Billboard)	94

== Release history ==
Region	Date	Format(s)	Label(s)	Ref.
United States	March 26, 1996	CD	Capitol	
United Kingdom	May 20, 1996	7-inch vinyl; CD	Capitol	
