= Living Type =

Single by Powderfinger

from the album Double Allergic
- Released: 11 November 1996
- Recorded: Sing Sing Studios, Melbourne
- Genre: Alternative rock
- Length: 3.24
- Label: Polydor
- Songwriter(s): Jon Coghill, John Collins, Bernard Fanning, Ian Haug, Darren Middleton
- Producer(s): Tim Whitten

Powderfinger singles chronology
"D.A.F." (1996)	"Living Type" (1996)	"Take Me In" (1997)

"Living Type" is the third single released from Powderfinger's second album Double Allergic. The single was released on 11 November 1996. The song, written by Bernard Fanning, the band's lead singer, concerned the victims of Charles Manson. The song was well received by the public, who voted it onto the Triple J Hottest 100, 1996. This was the first time Powderfinger had appeared on the chart.

== History ==
"Living Type" was released with one b-side track, dubbed "Other Delicacies". The track consisted of six 90 second blocks of music, with instrumental backgrounds. Guitarist Darren Middleton explained that the single would only have two tracks listed, and when referring to "Other Delicacies", said that "all the songs are recorded in a block so you can't skip them, you have to listen to the whole [single]".

"Living Type" was first performed live by Powderfinger whilst opening for You Am I on their "Uptight Express Tour". The shows were considered highly successful; much more so than Powderfinger's live performances with American heavy metal band Pantera, which the band found to be problematic.

=== Song meanings ===
Whilst there was some speculation that "Living Type" was "a cheesy, angsty love song", Powderfinger's lead singer, Bernard Fanning (who wrote the song), said it was actually about Charles Manson, and the people affected by his cult. Fanning said that he was unable to control what people thought about the song, and so didn't try, but that "cheesy love song" that it had been dubbed was "not the intention" of the song. In a subsequent interview, Fanning told Juice that people had been asking him if "Living Type" was about menstruation, which he dismissed as being "so stupid". However, he also re-iterated his statement that he was unable to control interpretations of the song, saying that "people have a freedom to think what they like".

== Music video ==
"Living Type"
A 22 second sample from Powderfinger's "Living Type".

The music video for "Living Type" was directed by David Barker, and filmed in Harrisville, near Powderfinger's home town; Brisbane. It was proclaimed as "most lavish visual work to date" by numerous commentators. The video tells the story of Squinty B Jones (played by Fanning), a man on the run from forces unknown (it is likely he is running from a psychiatric ward, which would tie in with the song's background). The video was praised as "dripping with Australiana." When asked which Powderfinger videos "had been crap", drummer Jon Coghill jokingly said that they all had, before stating that he liked the videos for "Living Type" and "Good-Day Ray", and stating that he hadn't always understood the "vibe" of the band's other videos.

== Response ==
"Living Type" was received favourably by the public, who voted it onto the Triple J Hottest 100, 1996. This was the first time Powderfinger had appeared on the chart, and "Pick You Up", another single from Double Allergic, came in at #6 on the chart.

== Track listing ==
1. "Living Type"
2. "Other delicacies" ("Entrees", "Mains" "Dessert")

== Charts ==
Chart (1996/97)	Peak position
Australia (ARIA)	42
