= Triple J's Hottest 100 of 1996 =

Most popular songs of 1996 in Australia

1996 Triple J Hottest 100
- Album artwork for the CD compilation

Countdown details
- Date of countdown: 26 January 1997

Countdown highlights
- Winning song: Spiderbait "Buy Me a Pony"
- Most entries: Bush; Powderfinger; The Smashing Pumpkins; Pearl Jam (3 tracks each)

Chronology
← Previous; 1995	Next → 1997

The 1996 Triple J Hottest 100, counted down on 26 January 1997, was a countdown of the most popular songs of the year, according to listeners of the Australian radio station Triple J. A CD featuring 31 of the songs was released. A countdown of the videos of most of the songs was also shown on the ABC music series Rage. The 1996 chart marked the first time an Australian band had topped the chart, with Spiderbait taking out top honours.

== Full list ==
Note: Australian artists

#	Song	Artist	Country of origin
1	Buy Me a Pony	Spiderbait	Australia
2	Stinkfist	Tool	United States
3	Underground	Ben Folds Five	United States
4	Pepper	Butthole Surfers	United States
5	Glycerine	Bush	United Kingdom
6	Pick You Up	Powderfinger	Australia
7	Breathe	The Prodigy	United Kingdom
8	The Ballad of the Skeletons	Allen Ginsberg	United States
9	El Scorcho	Weezer	United States
10	You're Gorgeous	Babybird	United Kingdom
11	Down	311	United States
12	Born Slippy .NUXX	Underworld	United Kingdom
13	1979	The Smashing Pumpkins	United States
14	Scooby Snacks	Fun Lovin' Criminals	United States
15	Kong Foo Sing	Regurgitator	Australia
16	Spaceman	Babylon Zoo	United Kingdom
17	Firestarter	The Prodigy	United Kingdom
18	D.A.F.	Powderfinger	Australia
19	Swallowed	Bush	United Kingdom
20	Dogs Are the Best People	The Fauves	Australia
21	Down in the Park	Foo Fighters	United States
22	Oh Yeah	Ash	United Kingdom
23	I Sucked a Lot of Cock to Get Where I Am	Regurgitator	Australia
24	Santa Monica	Everclear	United States
25	Just a Girl	No Doubt	United States
26	Setting Sun	The Chemical Brothers	United Kingdom
27	The Distance	Cake	United States
28	Zero	The Smashing Pumpkins	United States
29	Devils Haircut	Beck	United States
30	Self Abuser	The Fauves	Australia
31	The Muppet Song (Mah Na Mah Na)	Skin	United Kingdom
32	Living Type	Powderfinger	Australia
33	California Love	2Pac featuring Dr. Dre	United States
34	Mother Mother	Tracy Bonham	United States
35	Killing Me Softly	Fugees	United States
36	Standing Outside a Broken Phone Booth with Money in My Hand	Primitive Radio Gods	United States
37	Virtual Insanity	Jamiroquai	United Kingdom
38	Comedown	Bush	United Kingdom
39	Novocaine for the Soul	Eels	United States
40	Milk (The Wicked Mix)	Garbage featuring Tricky	United States/United Kingdom
41	Whoever You Are	Geggy Tah	United States
42	Coppertone	Fini Scad	Australia
43	Where It's At	Beck	United States
44	Salvation	The Cranberries	Ireland
45	Aneurysm	Nirvana	United States
46	Bulls on Parade	Rage Against the Machine	United States
47	Hail, Hail	Pearl Jam	United States
48	Popular	Nada Surf	United States
49	Pass the Vibes	Definition of Sound	United Kingdom
50	Mach 5	The Presidents of the United States of America	United States
51	Only Happy When It Rains	Garbage	United States
52	Until It Sleeps	Metallica	United States
53	Hyperballad	Björk	Iceland
54	If I Could Talk I'd Tell You	The Lemonheads	United States
55	Tonight, Tonight	The Smashing Pumpkins	United States
56	Susan's House	Eels	United States
57	So Rude	Rebecca's Empire	Australia
58	Heartspark Dollarsign	Everclear	United States
59	Silver Lizard	Tumbleweed	Australia
60	Hey Dude	Kula Shaker	United Kingdom
61	I'll Be Your Majick	Def FX	Australia
62	Hero of the Day	Metallica	United States
63	Punk Rock Song	Bad Religion	United States
64	Wombo Lombo	Angélique Kidjo	Benin
65	Here in Your Bedroom	Goldfinger	United States
66	What's Come Over Me	Frente!	Australia
67	Everything Is Good for You	Crowded House	Australia
68	Theme from Mission: Impossible	Adam Clayton and Larry Mullen Jr.	Ireland
69	Speculator	Insurge	Australia
70	Don't It Get You Down	Deadstar	Australia
71	Disco 2000	Pulp	United Kingdom
72	Punch in the Face	Frenzal Rhomb	Australia
73	Gold Dust Woman	Hole	United States
74	Lay Lady Lay	Ministry	United States
75	Surf's Up Tonight	Midnight Oil	Australia
76	In the Meantime	Spacehog	United Kingdom
77	Burden in My Hand	Soundgarden	United States
78	How Bizarre	OMC	New Zealand
79	I Make Hamburgers	The Whitlams	Australia
80	Soldiers	You Am I	Australia
81	Shut My Eyes	The Superjesus	Australia
82	Naked Eye	Luscious Jackson	United States
83	Waking Up Tired	Hoodoo Gurus	Australia
84	Good Mornin'	You Am I	Australia
85	Goldfinger	Ash	United Kingdom
86	Woman	Neneh Cherry	Sweden
87	E-Bow the Letter	R.E.M.	United States
88	Grooving	The Hunting Party	Australia
89	Cromagnonman	Snout	Australia
90	Leaving Here	Pearl Jam	United States
91	Set the Controls For the Heart of the Pelvis	Barry Adamson	United Kingdom
92	Thunder	The Mavis's	Australia
93	All I Want	Skunk Anansie	United Kingdom
94	Mankind	Pearl Jam	United States
95	Creep	Frank Bennett	Australia
96	Ella's Uncle	Matt Trapnell & Trapazoid	Australia
97	Hail Caesar	AC/DC	Australia
98	Professional Widow (Armand's Star Trunk Funkin' Mix)	Tori Amos	United States
99	Ready to Go	Republica	United Kingdom
100	Gold to Me	Ben Harper	United States

== Statistics ==
=== Artists with multiple entries ===
#	Artist	Tracks
3	Bush	5, 19, 38
3	Powderfinger	6, 18, 32
3	The Smashing Pumpkins	13, 28, 55
3	Pearl Jam	47, 90, 94
2	The Prodigy	7, 17
2	Regurgitator	15, 23
2	The Fauves	20, 30
2	Dave Grohl (Note: Once with Foo Fighters (21), once with Nirvana (45))	21, 45
2	Ash	22, 85
2	Everclear	24, 58
2	Beck	29, 43
2	Eels	39, 56
2	Garbage	40, 51
2	Metallica	52, 62
2	You Am I	80, 84

=== Countries represented ===
Country	Total
United States	45
Australia	29
United Kingdom	21
Ireland	2
Benin	1
Iceland	1
New Zealand	1
Sweden	1

== CD release ==
Disc 1
1. Spiderbait – "Buy Me a Pony" (1:41)
2. Tool – "Stinkfist" (5:09)
3. Ben Folds Five – "Underground" (4:11)
4. Butthole Surfers – "Pepper" (4:54)
5. Bush – "Glycerine" (4:24)
6. The Prodigy – "Breathe" (3:59)
7. Allen Ginsberg – "Ballad of the Skeletons" (4:07)
8. Weezer – "El Scorcho" (4:03)
9. Babybird – "You're Gorgeous" (3:44)
10. 311 – "Down" (2:51)
11. Underworld – "Born Slippy" (3:42)
12. Fun Lovin' Criminals – "Scooby Snacks" (3:02)
13. Babylon Zoo – "Spaceman" (4:05)
14. Powderfinger – "D.A.F." (3:30)
15. Regurgitator – "I Sucked a Lot of Cock to Get Where I Am" (2:34)
16. Everclear – "Santa Monica" (3:11)
17. No Doubt – "Just a Girl" (3:28)
Disc 2
1. Cake – "The Distance" (2:58)
2. Beck – "Devils Haircut" (3:13)
3. Skin – "Mah Nà Mah Nà (The Muppet Song)" (1:36)
4. Jamiroquai – "Virtual Insanity" (5:40)
5. Eels – "Novocaine for the Soul" (3:07)
6. Garbage – "Milk" (Single Edit – Shirley) (4:00)
7. Geggy Tah – "Whoever You Are" (4:34)
8. Fini Scad – "Coppertone" (3:38)
9. Björk – "Hyperballad" (5:21)
10. The Lemonheads – "If I Could Talk I'd Tell You" (2:50)
11. Rebecca's Empire – "So Rude" (3:37)
12. Def FX – "I'll Be Your Majick" (3:13)
13. Angélique Kidjo – "Wombo Lombo" (4:14)
14. The Whitlams – "I Make Hamburgers" (3:34)
15. Matthew Trapnell and Trapezoid – "Ella's Uncle" (5:52)
16. Tori Amos – "Professional Widow" (3:47)

Note: "Milk" is actually the Shirley and Tricky single edit instead of the Shirley single edit listed on the track listing.

A later release omits "Stinkfist", "Down", "Just a Girl", "The Distance", and "Devils Haircut", while including "Disco 2000" by Pulp, "Self Abuser" by The Fauves, and "A Punch in the Face" by Frenzal Rhomb.

=== Certifications ===
Region	Certification	Certified units/sales
Australia (ARIA)	2× Platinum	140,000^{^}
^{^} Shipments figures based on certification alone.

== See also ==
- 1996 in music
