= Art history (disambiguation) =

Art history is the academic study of objects of art in their historical development and stylistic contexts.

Art history may also refer to:

- Art History (journal), an academic journal of the Association of Art Historians
- History of art, the history of the visual arts of painting, sculpture and architecture
- Art History (album), a 2012 album by Chicago indie pop quartet California Wives
- Art History (film), a 2011 American drama film
