= Unreleased =

Unreleased may refer to:

- Unreleased (Andre Nickatina album), 2001
- Unreleased (No-Big-Silence album), 2003
- Unreleased (1998–2010), an album by Powderfinger, 2020
- Groupees Unreleased EP, or Unreleased, by Celldweller, 2011
- Unreleased, an EP by Nicole Dollanganger, 2014
- Unreleased stop, in phonetics, a plosive consonant without an audible release burst
