= Golden Rule (album) =

Studio album by Powderfinger
- Released: 13 November 2009
- Recorded: Mid-2009
- Studios: Studio 301 (Byron Bay, New South Wales)
- Genres: Rock; alternative rock
- Length: 44:53
- Label: Universal Music
- Producer: Nick DiDia

Powderfinger chronology
Dream Days at the Hotel Existence (2007)	Golden Rule (2009)	Footprints: The Best of Powderfinger, 2001–2011 (2011)

Singles from Golden Rule
- 1. "All of the Dreamers" Released: 16 October 2009; 2. "Burn Your Name" Released: 18 December 2009; 3. "Sail the Wildest Stretch" Released: 30 April 2010; 4. "Iberian Dream" Released: 16 August 2010

Professional ratings
Review scores
Source	Rating
Allmusic	4/5 stars

Golden Rule is the seventh and final studio album by Australian rock band Powderfinger, released on 13 November 2009. The album reunites the band with producer Nick DiDia, who produced several of the group's previous albums including, Internationalist, Odyssey Number Five and Vulture Street.

== Background ==
The band recorded the album at Studio 301 in Byron Bay, New South Wales, beginning in June 2009, and completing the recording in August. The group's drummer Jon Coghill announced the name of the album on 11 September 2009.

The crowd was recorded at the 2009 Splendour in the Grass for the song "Think It Over".

== Singles ==
The first single to be released was "All of the Dreamers", which was released on 16 October 2009. Lead singer Bernard Fanning describes the song as the "most consistently upbeat song that we have written in our entire career," and that "it's a sideways glance at the sometimes redundant nature of party politics", however he has stated that it is not a particularly political song, but rather "a general dissatisfaction with the way democracy can be blindsided by the self interest that holding on to power can generate". "All of the Dreamers" was ranked no. 49 in Triple J's Hottest 100 of 2009.

On 6 November it was mentioned by the band's lead guitarist Darren Middleton on the Powderfinger website that the upcoming second single off the album would be "Burn Your Name". The video clip for the song was filmed in Thailand.

"Sail the Wildest Stretch" was remixed by Michael Brauer and released as the band's third single from the album in April 2010.

"Iberian Dream" is the final single off the album, released on 16 August 2010.

== Track listing ==
Prior to its release on 13 November 2009, the track listing was changed to reorder the first four songs, and two iTunes bonus tracks were added: "See You Again" and "See Me Coming".

The first track "El Camino de la Muerte" is Spanish for "The Path of Death".

All words and music by Powderfinger.

No.	Title	Length
1.	"El Camino de la Muerte"	0:42
2.	"All of the Dreamers"	3:36
3.	"Burn Your Name"	3:52
4.	"A Fight About Money"	5:06
5.	"Sail the Wildest Stretch"	4:09
6.	"Poison in Your Mind"	2:47
7.	"Iberian Dream"	4:19
8.	"Jewel"	2:57
9.	"Think It Over"	4:20
10.	"Awake"	4:22
11.	"Stand Yourself"	3:52
12.	"Golden Rule"	4:51
Total length:		44:53

iTunes bonus tracks
No.	Title	Length
13.	"See You Again"	3:44
14.	"See Me Coming"	3:27
Total length:		52:04

Bonus live CD
No.	Title	Length
1.	"Waiting for the Sun"	5:40
2.	"My Kind of Scene"	6:12
3.	"Nobody Sees"	4:44
4.	"Sweetlip"	4:02
5.	"Bless My Soul"	5:48
6.	"Lost and Running"	4:23
7.	"JC"	3:29
8.	"Trading Places"	6:41
9.	"These Days"	5:52
Total length:		46:51

== Charts ==
=== Weekly charts ===
Chart (2009/10)	Peak position
Australian Albums (ARIA)	1

=== Year-end charts ===
Chart (2009)	Position
Australian Albums (ARIA)	30
Chart (2010)	Position
Australian Albums (ARIA)	32

== Certifications ==
Region	Certification	Certified units/sales
Australia (ARIA)	2× Platinum	140,000^{^}
^{^} Shipments figures based on certification alone.
