= The Triple M Acoustic Sessions =

EP by Powderfinger
- Released: 1999 (Australia)
- Studio: Triple M (Sydney)
- Genre: Rock
- Label: Universal (Powderpro17)
- Producer: Powderfinger

Powderfinger chronology
Internationalist (1998)	The Triple M Acoustic Sessions (1999)	Odyssey Number Five (2000)

The Triple M Acoustic Sessions is the fourth EP by Australian rock band Powderfinger released in 1999. It is a rare EP recorded by the band in Sydney radio studio Triple M featuring only three songs all from their 1998 album Internationalist. As is printed on the cover of the EP, there were only 800 copies pressed. Some copies of the album were given away by Triple M as competition prizes, some sold for charity and some simply distributed to Australian music stores, though due to low supply, these were collected very quickly by fans.

== Cover art ==
The cover art is taken from the inside sleeve of Internationalist. It was used also as the cover of "Already Gone" prior to the EP's release. Notably as it contains the same image as the cover of "Already Gone," that same song features as the first track from the EP, while the other two songs were not released as singles at all. The artwork has been tweaked to fit this EP, however. The sleeve from Internationalist and the cover of "Already Gone" both display the artwork as predominantly autumn colours with the person in the foreground in blue overalls, while the Triple M version has been desaturated of colour except the ground in the image has been recoloured to red (from brown in the other image). The image itself is of a farmer raising his arms as aeroplanes fly overhead. The art style is art deco and very simplistic. The typesetting of the band's name and all other text is the same as that of the cover of Internationalist and all of its singles.

== Songs ==
The songs featured on the EP were all originated from Internationalist. "Already Gone" was released as a single earlier in 1998 and is the first track. The second track is "Private Man" which is written about the pressures of celebrities, and draws indirect references to former INXS lead singer Michael Hutchence. The third song "Hindley Street" is a song of duality, with the verses complaining of being homesick and the troubles of fame, while the choruses then mock the verses pointing out the luxuries of celebrity. The song is named after a street in a red light district of Australian city Adelaide. The song also gives its name to a large fan network of Powderfinger fans "Hindley Site".

== Track listing ==
All music written by Bernard Fanning, John Collins, Ian Haug, Darren Middleton, Jon Coghill. Lyrics as noted individually.

1. "Already Gone" – 5:00
2. "Private Man" – 4:39
3. "Hindley Street" – 4:04
