= Mr Kneebone =

EP by Powderfinger
- Released: 24 July 1995 (Australia)
- Recorded: April 1995
- Studio: Metropolis (Melbourne)
- Genre: Rock
- Length: 18:26
- Label: Egg the Nest / Polygram
- Producers: Lachlan "Magoo" Goold, Powderfinger

Powderfinger chronology
Parables for Wooden Ears (1994)	Mr Kneebone (1995)	Double Allergic (1996)

Mr Kneebone is the third EP by the Australian rock band Powderfinger. It was released after their debut studio album, Parables for Wooden Ears, and before their second album, Double Allergic. It contains five songs, none of which were included on either album. The EP peaked at #83 on the Australian singles chart, and is considered to be "the turning point in Powderfinger's song writing career".

== Background ==
Following the lack of success of their first album, Parables for Wooden Ears, and despite the moderate success of the EP that preceded it, Transfusion, Powderfinger decided to continue writing and improving their craft and recording music. The group returned to recording with Lachlan "Magoo" Goold, who had produced Transfusion, but chose to record in Metropolis Studios Melbourne where they had recorded Parables. Though the band was signed on a contract with the UK label Polydor Records, the group released the EP independently with the one-off label title Egg the Nest. Powderfinger officially released the EP at a party at the Roxy in the Valley in Brisbane on 28 July 1995, with local support acts Ammonia, Turtlebox and Webster. At the launch, the group performed songs from all of their releases, and played all of the songs from Mr Kneebone. A reviewer from the Australian rock music magazine Time Off commented that "they power into over-drive with the new "I'm Splitting Terry"," the EP's final song, with which the group opened the show. The reviewer said of the launch performance, "Powderfinger embody one of the most exciting futures of Australian rock music. They’re in their element playing loud and live."

== Cover art ==
The cover art is an image of the title character Mr Kneebone and was painted by Jolyon Robinson. It was commonly believed to be an image of the group's lead vocalist, Bernard Fanning, but the band notes that this was never the intention while acknowledging the coincidental likeness. As the band are all avid cricket supporters, inside the album sleeve the band thanks, among others, Australian cricketers Mark and Steve Waugh.

== Personnel ==
=== Powderfinger ===
- Bernard Fanning – guitar and vocals
- John Collins – bass guitar
- Ian Haug – guitars
- Darren Middleton – guitars
- Jon Coghill – drums

=== Artwork ===
- Art concept – Rachel Liddle, Travers Murr and Powderfinger
- Graphics layout – Rachel Liddle
- Paintings – Jolyon Robinson

=== Production ===
Recorded at Metropolis Studios, Melbourne

- Produced by Lachlan 'Magoo' Goold and Powderfinger
- Mixed and engineered by Goold and Andy Baldwin
- Mastered at Studios 301 by Don Bartley

== Track listing ==
All music written, arranged and performed by Bernard Fanning, John Collins, Ian Haug, Darren Middleton, Jon Coghill. Lyrics by Fanning.

1. "Swollen Tongue" – 3:12
2. "Stitches" – 3:51
3. "Drongo" – 3:53
4. "My Urn" – 4:25
5. "I'm Splittin' Terry" – 3:05

== Charts ==
Chart (1995)	Peak position
Australia (ARIA)	83
