= Unreleased (1998–2010) =

Compilation album by Powderfinger
- Released: 27 November 2020
- Recorded: Various
- Length: 37:14
- Label: Universal Music Australia

Powderfinger chronology
One Night Lonely (2020)	Unreleased (1998–2010) (2020)

Singles from Unreleased (1998–2010)
- 1. "Day by Day" Released: 17 September 2020; 2. "Daybreak" Released: 13 November 2020

Unreleased (1998–2010) is the fourth compilation album by Australian alternative rock band Powderfinger, released on 27 November 2020. The album comprises ten previously unheard and unreleased tracks recorded between the years of 1998 and 2010, and stored on various hard drives and tapes within the band's archives.

== Background ==
In August 2020, Powderfinger told Double J that they had stumbled across a range of recordings in their vaults while searching for extra material to accompany the 20th-anniversary reissue of their Odyssey Number Five album.

The release was first teased in late August, the group revealing that they would be issuing a record of unheard tracks later in the year, with "Day by Day" serving as its first single in mid-September.

The album's release date and track listing was confirmed on 15 October 2020, with guitarist Darren Middleton telling Double J, "Essentially what you're going to hear is the band spanning about 10 years, with songs that for one reason or another just didn't make the cut at the time, or just didn't suit the purposes of whatever we were doing."

== Singles ==
"Day by Day" was announced in late August and officially released on 17 September 2020. The song was recorded for but not included on 2003's Vulture Street. Vocalist Bernard Fanning said, "'Day by Day' was never completed until we opened the archives and went sniffing around for tracks that had never been released. We never even really had a rough mix of it as we had obviously decided at the time that it didn't quite fit with the rest of the songs on that album. Looking back now, I'm not sure why and I'm actually amazed we didn't find a place for it on the record. Once we found it, we had Nick DiDia remix it and get it into shape."

"Daybreak" was released on 13 November 2020 as the album's second single.

== Track listing ==
Unreleased (1998–2010) track listing
No.	Title	Writer(s)	Length
1.	"Day by Day"	Bernard Fanning, Darren Middleton, Ian David Haug, John Collins, Jon Coghill	3:12
2.	"Daybreak"		3:54
3.	"What Are You Waiting for"		3:47
4.	"Diamond Ring"		3:23
5.	"Say It So I Know"		4:12
6.	"Lou Doimand"		4:09
7.	"I Don't Want to Be Your Problem"		3:44
8.	"Rule of Thumb"		3:49
9.	"Happy"		3:09
10.	"Wrecking Ball"		3:55
Total length:			37:14

== Charts ==
=== Weekly charts ===
Chart performance for Unreleased (1998–2010)
Chart (2020)	Peak position
Australian Albums (ARIA)	2

=== Year-end charts ===
Chart (2020)	Position
Australian Artist Albums (ARIA)	42
