= Heroin Girl =

- UK 7" single version

Single by Everclear

from the album Sparkle and Fade
- A-side: "Heroin Girl"
- B-side: "Annabella's Song, Nehalem (alt Mix), American Girl"
- Released: 1995
- Recorded: September 1994
- Genre: Punk rock; alternative rock
- Length: 2:23
- Label: Capitol, Fire Records
- Songwriters: Art Alexakis, Scott Cuthbert, Craig Montoya

Everclear singles chronology
"Fire Maple Song" (1994)	"Heroin Girl" (1995)	"Santa Monica" (1996)

Music video
- "Heroin Girl" on YouTube

"Heroin Girl" is a rock song by the band Everclear from their 1995 album Sparkle and Fade. This song is generally agreed to be about lead singer Art Alexakis's girlfriend and brother overdosing on heroin; he heard the policeman say "Just another overdose" about his brother's death, a lyric used in the song.

== Track listing ==
1-TRACK PROMO (Capitol)

1. "Heroin Girl"

UK MAXI-SINGLE (Fire Records)

1. "Heroin Girl"
2. "Annabella's Song"
3. "Nehalem (alternate mix)"
4. "American Girl" (Tom Petty and the Heartbreakers cover)

UK 7-INCH (Fire Records)

1. "Heroin Girl"
2. "American Girl"

== Charts ==
Chart (1995)	Peak position
Australia (ARIA)	76
Canada Rock/Alternative (RPM)	23
US Alternative Airplay (Billboard)	34
