= Take Me In (Powderfinger song) =

Single by Powderfinger

from the album Double Allergic
- Released: 12 May 1997 (Australia)
- Recorded: Sing Sing Studios, Melbourne
- Genre: Rock
- Label: Polydor
- Songwriter(s): Jon Coghill, John Collins, Bernard Fanning, Ian Haug, Darren Middleton
- Producer(s): Tim Whitten

Powderfinger singles chronology
"Living Type" (1997)	"Take Me In" (1997)	"The Day You Come" (1998)

"Take Me In" is the fourth and final single released from Powderfinger's second album Double Allergic. The single was released on 12 May 1997, and received a warm response from fans, although it was not as successful as the prior singles from the album. The video clips for Double Allergic were released onto a video (and later re-released on DVD) with the same cover as "Take Me In" with the small video collection titled "Take Me In".

== Track listings ==
=== CD single ===
1. "Take Me In"
2. "Skinny Jean" (live)
3. "Tail" (live)

=== Video/DVD ===
1. "Take Me In"
2. "Skinny Jean" (live)
3. "Tail" (live)
4. "Living Type"
5. "D.A.F."

== Charts ==
Chart (1997)	Peak position
Australia (ARIA)	91
