= Sunsets (song) =

2004 single by Powderfinger

Single by Powderfinger

from the album Vulture Street
- Released: 4 January 2004
- Genre: Alternative rock
- Length: 3:50
- Label: Polydor, Universal
- Songwriters: Jon Coghill, John Collins, Bernard Fanning, Ian Haug, Darren Middleton
- Producer: Nick DiDia

Powderfinger singles chronology
"Love Your Way" (2003)	"Sunsets" (2004)	"Since You've Been Gone" (2004)

"Sunsets" is a song released as the third single from Australian rock band Powderfinger's fifth studio album, Vulture Street. The single was released in January 2004. "Sunsets" earned a mixed response from reviewers. Some reviewers praised its appeal and aggression, while others appreciated the power ballad elements within it. Others, however, described the song negatively as "lumbering". "Sunsets" charted moderately, reaching No. 11 on the Australian Singles Chart.

== Recording and production ==
Powderfinger "Sunsets"
20-second sample from "Sunsets", demonstrating the "power ballad" elements commented on by Bernard Zuel.

Vulture Street was recorded and developed over a seven-week period in Sydney, Australia. It was during this time that "Sunsets" was written and produced. Nick DiDia produced the album, as he had done on previous Powderfinger albums including Odyssey Number Five. "Sunsets" was mixed in Atlanta, Georgia, by Brendan OBrien, who had previously worked with DiDia. Fanning described the album during production stages as "a much more dry, direct rock", but also noted that "just because I rock, doesn't mean I'm made of stone". In that sense, "Sunsets" (and numerous other songs on Vulture Street) were seen as emotive, combined with the rock elements Fanning described.

In an interview with Undercover magazine, Powderfinger guitarist Darren Middleton described "Sunsets" as one of (songwriter and lead vocalist) Bernard Fanning's older songs. He said it was similar to the acoustic songs on Odyssey Number Five, the band's previous album. Middleton also said the band worked hard to make "Sunsets" heavy, so that it shared the feel of other songs on the album. In an interview with Rove host Rove McManus, Fanning described Vulture Street as the band wanting to "make a change" and "go back to why [they] started playing". He cited rock and roll from the 1970s as a major influence on the album, especially the work of Led Zeppelin and AC/DC.

== Response ==
"Sunsets" was received with varying levels of enthusiasm from reviewers. MusicOMH reviewer Simon Evans described "Sunsets" and "Stumblin'" as some of the more "lumbering" moments on Vulture Street, but still said they contained "a certain earthy appeal". In his review of Vulture Street, Sputnikmusic contributor James Bishop agreed, calling "Sunsets" the "most successful single from the album", and praising its emotional impact.

Meanwhile, Allmusic's Vulture Street reviewer, Jason MacNeil, described "Sunsets" as "adorable", and drew comparisons to The Verve's "Lucky Man". Sydney Morning Herald's Bernard Zuel agreed, praising "Sunsets" as "the new definition of power ballad", and saying the song contained "open-hearted feeling and well-constructed progression".

== Music video ==
The music video for "Sunsets" was created by the animation studio Liquid Animation. It begins with the following dialogue in yellow:

In the time of the Chou Dynasty it was believed there existed Ten Celestial Suns. Each day, one sun would be harnessed to a jade dragon and drawn across the heavens, bringing life and light to the world. It was their duty, all they had known – but in their hearts a cold and secret fire grew...

The visual theme for the video is the Chinese legend of Houyi. The video goes on to introduce King Di-Jun, his ten sons (who are also the Celestial Suns), Queen Xi and Warrior Yi. The video shows one of the King's ten sons being strapped to the back of the jade dragon, but breaks free and the sons made life on Earth unbearable, so the King send the warrior who was introduced earlier to kill them. He succeeds in finding them, and kills all but one.

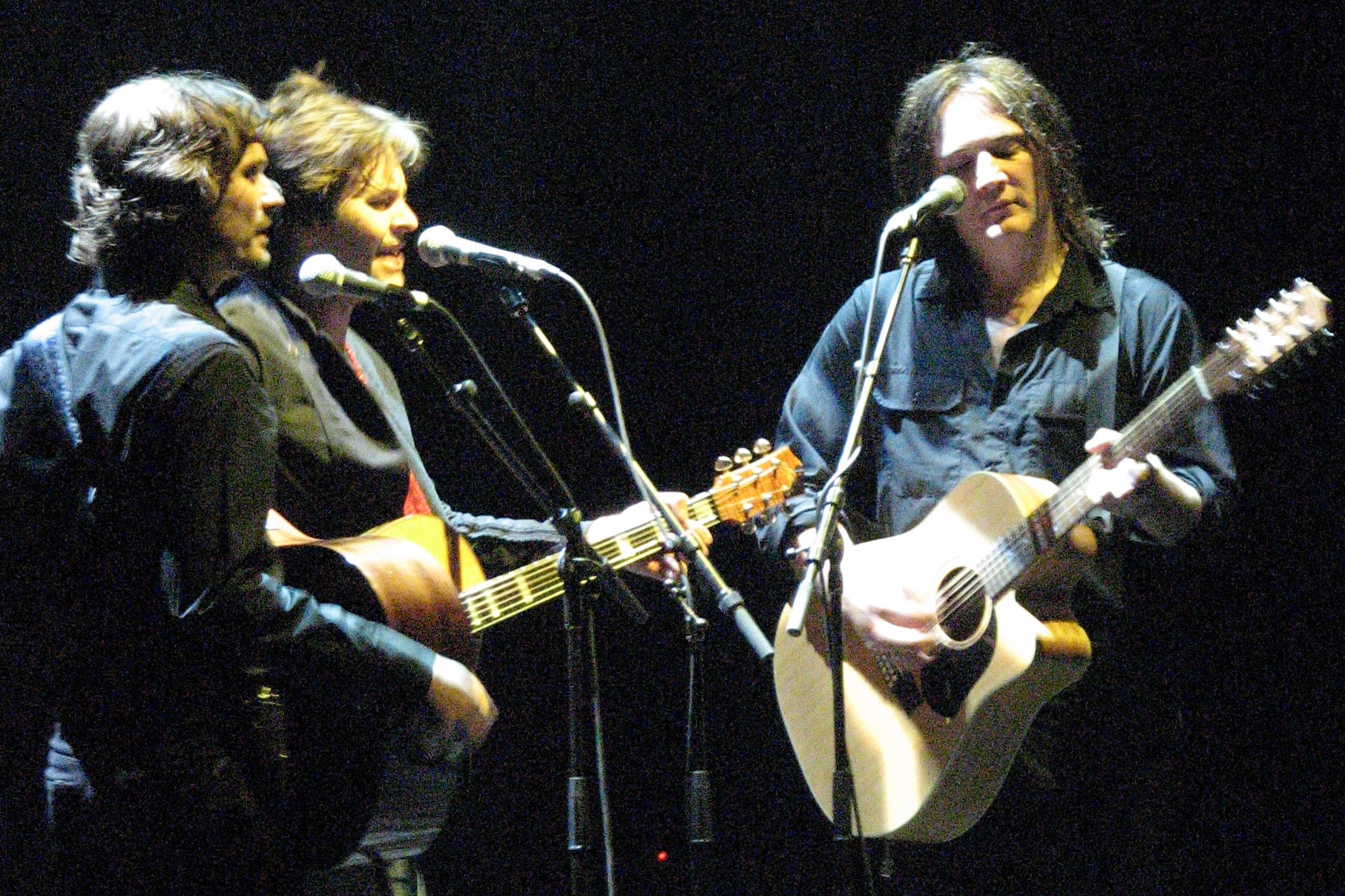
(L-R) Middleton, Fanning, and Haug performing an acoustic version of "Sunsets" on the Across the Great Divide tour on 8 September 2007.

An acoustic video for "Sunsets" is also featured on bonus DVDs for Vulture Street, and Dream Days at the Hotel Existence, as well as the Sunsets DVD single and These Days: Live in Concert "low key" DVD. The video features Bernard Fanning and Darren Middleton playing the song in a rehearsal room.

== Accolades ==
Accolades for "Sunsets"
Year	Organisation	Ceremony	Award	Result
2003	Triple J	Hottest 100	N/A	No. 7
2004	ARIA	ARIA Music Awards	Best Group	Nominated

== Track listing ==
1. "Sunsets"
2. "Sunsets" (acoustic)
3. "Rita" (Audio Airlock demos)
4. "Not the Only One" (studio outtake)

== Personnel ==
Powderfinger

- Bernard Fanning — Guitar and vocals
- John Collins — Bass guitar
- Ian Haug — Guitars
- Darren Middleton — Guitars
- Jon Coghill — Drums

Additional musicians

- Tony Reyes – Keyboards, guitar and backing vocals
- Shauna Jensen and Maggie McKinney – Backing vocals
- Lachlan Doley – Hammond organ and piano
- Nick DiDia – Tambourine and anüsaphone

Production

- Nick DiDia – Producer, engineer
- Tony Reyes – Producer
- Brendan O'Brien – Mixer
- Anton Hagop – Additional engineer
- Catherine Claire – Assistant engineer
- Paul Piticco, Brian Quinn, Annette Perkins, Janne Scott and Jean Reid – Managers
- Steven Gorrow – Art and direction
- Christopher Morris – Photographer

== Charts ==
Weekly chart performance for "Sunsets"
Chart (2004)	Peak position
Australia (ARIA)	11
New Zealand (Recorded Music NZ)	38

== See also ==
- Powderfinger songs
- Full discography
