= Internationalist (album) =

Studio album by Powderfinger
- Released: 7 September 1998 (Australia)
- Recorded: 1997–98
- Studio: Sing Sing (Melbourne)
- Genre: Alternative rock
- Length: 45:33
- Label: Polydor
- Producer: Nick DiDia

Powderfinger chronology
Double Allergic (1996)	Internationalist (1998)	The Triple M Acoustic Sessions (1999)

Singles from Internationalist
- 1. "The Day You Come" Released: 10 August 1998; 2. "Don't Wanna Be Left Out" "Good-Day Ray" Released: 9 November 1998; 3. "Already Gone" Released: 12th February 1999; 4. "Passenger" Released: 9th August 1999

Internationalist is the third studio album by Australian alternative rock band Powderfinger. The album was released on 7 September 1998 and was often labelled Powderfinger's most adventurous work, with greater experimentation than in previous works.

Internationalist followed in the success of its predecessor, Double Allergic, and was certified five times platinum in Australia. Internationalist received four ARIA Music Awards, including "Album of the Year". The album produced four singles for the band; "The Day You Come", "Don't Wanna Be Left Out/Good-Day Ray", "Already Gone" and "Passenger", which all appeared on Triple J's Hottest 100 poll in two consecutive years.

Internationalist received fairly positive reviews in the Australian press, and cemented Powderfinger's position on the local music scene; however, the album failed to launch the band in the overseas market.

== Background ==
Powderfinger spent much of early 1997 touring, after the success of Double Allergic. Songwriter Bernard Fanning then spent much of 1997 writing songs for Internationalist in Brisbane, drawing on inspiration from a mid-1997 band trip to the United States.

The album's title refers to escapism—namely, the ability that an "internationalist" has to escape from racial and social tension. When asked in a Juice interview, Bernard Fanning summarised the title of the album by stating;

It's about the idea of all this tension that is around at the moment, all this racial and political tension ... The idea is that an 'internationalist' has an escape from all that. Music can be a vehicle for that escape.

== Recording and production ==
Internationalist was recorded at Melbourne's Sing Sing Studios, with Powderfinger accompanied by American producer Nick DiDia for the first time. As the band had already prepared "about 30 or 40" songs when they entered the studio, DiDia's task was relatively minor. Bassist John Collins said of DiDia; "Nick was really good. The way Nick based the record was that he wanted to record the band how we were at that particular moment, he didn't want to play around too much." As a result of this attitude, the band spent only one month in the studio, and the album was mixed by DiDia soon after. Powderfinger used the extra time to play table tennis, which was the band's recreation of choice during the Internationalist and Odyssey Number Five recording sessions.

Collins described the album as not being as easy listening as their previous work, and that it contained numerous experiments in songwriting that they had not put into previous albums. Fanning later said Internationalist was "a better record" than Double Allergic, but acknowledged that it was not as easily likeable—it was just an improvement in songwriting. Collins and Fanning acknowledged that the album's experimental nature could lose them some old fans, but the pair drew parallels with bands such as U2, who Collins said had "constantly re-invented themselves, and with success". He said Powderfinger's reinvention was as much for the band's own interest as it was for the "public's perception". Meanwhile, guitarist Ian Haug described the album as a "moderation" between Parables for Wooden Ears ("the complicated beast") and Double Allergic ("totally simplified"), Powderfinger's two previous albums. He also agreed that the album was much more experimental, and described the album as the band's "most successful", as well as saying the album that best replicated "the sound we have live".

Numerous songs on Internationalist were politically and socially influenced, although the band denied it being a deliberate motif. Fanning explaining that the band did not intentionally discuss political issues, saying "we don't try to do anything in particular". He noted, however, that the songs, as his emotional responses to recent events, could inevitably be interpreted as being political. When "The Day You Come" was released, there was speculation that it alluded to Pauline Hanson's One Nation political party, although the band claimed the song was vague and didn't specifically refer to one person. Fanning said of "The Day You Come";

I wouldn't certainly say that we've written any protest songs – "The Day You Come" is the closest to that kind of song, and that typically, like most of our songs can be construed in many ways. And it was particularly about the way Australian electorate I suppose is moving, and thinking.

== Singles ==
"Don't Wanna Be Left Out"
An 18-second sample from "Don't Wanna Be Left Out", which was described as "one of the roughest Powderfinger songs to date".

"Passenger"
A 20 second sample of the chorus of "Passenger", which won "Song of the Year" at the 1999 ARIA Awards.

The first single from the album was "The Day You Come", a politically and socially influenced song. The band did not intend for it to be the first single, and released it only when they could not decide on anything else. Haug said it being "a pretty inoffensive song musically" helped Powderfinger make that decision. "The Day You Come" spent nine weeks on the ARIA Charts, peaking at #25.

The second single was the double a-side, "Don't Wanna Be Left Out/Good-Day Ray", released on 9 November 1998. "Don't Wanna Be Left Out", a song about a friend of Fanning's who had difficulty in social situations, was one of the roughest Powderfinger songs to date. 'Don't Wanna Be Left Out' could be comfortably ranked with other Powderfinger songs such as 'Lighten My Load' and 'Rise Up'. Drummer Jon Coghill described it as the most difficult Powderfinger song to play live at the time, because it was so "fast and offbeat". The music video for "Don't Wanna Be Left Out" was unpopular and drew criticism from band members. "Good-Day Ray" was dedicated to Australian television presenter Ray Martin and his public disagreements with former Media Watch host Stuart Littlemore. Its lyrics verged on punk, though Coghill denied that Powderfinger were a punk band. He also described the music video for "Good-Day Ray" as being one of the better videos the band had made.

Internationalist's third single was "Already Gone", released on 12 February 1999. The song was a tribute to the Beatles and their influence on Powderfinger's music. The fourth and final single from the album was "Passenger", released on 9 August 1999. "Passenger" was influenced by Elvis Presley, and included a big horn section, as well as backing vocals from folk group Tiddas. "Passenger" won the ARIA Award for "Song of the Year" in 1999. The song's music video was one of Powderfinger's first to feature computer graphics, and was produced by Fifty Fifty Films. "Passenger" spent 11 weeks on the ARIA Charts, peaking at #30. It appeared at #48 on Max's top 100 songs from the 1990s list.

== Tour and promotion ==
Powderfinger went on a nationwide tour after the release of Internationalist, performing with British band Swervedriver and fellow Brisbane band Not From There in capital cities across Australia. In 1999, the band also toured with Something for Kate and Alex Lloyd. Collins described the process of choosing who the band would play with as a simple matter of choosing whose music the band preferred, stating "we had played with most of the bands, and if you're going on tour with someone you may as well go with someone you get along with and whose music you enjoy." Despite being fans of Swervedriver, who were renowned for "their capability to reproduce their album sound perfectly in the live setting" according to Beat Magazine's Neala Johnson, Fanning said Powderfinger would never attempt to replicate them, because he believed their live shows to be much more "emotionally powerful" than recordings.

With Internationalist, Powderfinger first set their sights overseas, appearing at numerous music festivals in the U.S., including South by Southwest in Texas. While in the U.S., Powderfinger played several showcase performances to record-label representatives in Los Angeles and New York City. In a later interview in Australia, Fanning said these shows were difficult due to the lack of any homegrown fan support. He also said the band were not focused at the shows, and thus they did not go as well as he had hoped. Coghill, however, described the showcases, and the performances in Austin, as "worthwhile" and "fun". After performing in the United States, Powderfinger completed a tour of Canada. Fanning described the band's overseas outlook as a necessity for an Australian-based band, as "people [in Australia] are going to get sick of you pretty quickly if you're going to do five tours a year, so that you can sustain yourself financially."

== Reception ==
Internationalist debuted at the top of the ARIA Albums Chart, and was certified gold in its first week, selling over 35,000 copies. It then went on to go platinum, and is currently certified platinum five times, for 350,000 copies. At the 1999 ARIA Awards, the album received three awards—"Album of the Year", "Best Rock Album", and "Best Cover Art". "The Day You Come" also won "Single of the Year". In 2000, "Passenger" was nominated for three awards, but did not win any.

Haug said he was amazed with the highly positive critical response the album had received, surprised that "even Molly [Meldrum] gave it nine out of ten." The positivity of the album's reception created a feeling of surrealism, and Haug told Juice Magazine "I wish someone would write a really bad [review]." Nonetheless, he appreciated the credibility the album helped Powderfinger develop. Coghill agreed with Haug on the album's popularity, stating "you couldn't ask for much better", and saying he really took notice of the album's positive critical commentary. Juice's Benedict Watts said it received "a level of universal praise not yet dished out on an Australian release since You Am I's Hi Fi Way". Despite Polydor telling the band the album would be heavily marketed, Fanning still found its success surprising. HIT's Teresa Bolster suggested Fanning feared the worst during songwriting; "Celebrity Head", a song on the album, was seen as a "pre-emptive, scathing attack on music writers", which he argued was intended as a joke.

Internationalist's critical reception was positive, following in its chart success. The Courier-Mail's Nicola Six called it the band's most diverse album yet, using "The Day You Come" as an example; its "opening staccato guitar riff to the way the bass blends with Bernard Fanning's almost-falsetto in the final chorus" made it the "perfect first single". Watts said it "brilliantly pre-empts the mood and progressive nature of the album", and Allmusic's Jonathan Lewis described it as the best track on the album. The Weekend Australian's Iain Shedden said it was "one of the best Australian rock songs of the decade".

"The Day You Come" was not the only single to draw praise; "Don't Wanna Be Left Out" was described as "surf guitar-fuelled", "Good Day Ray" as "thrashy", and HIT's Teresa Bolster wrote that the released of the two as an A-side displayed the album's true scope to the public. AllMusic approved of the "rocking" "Don't Wanna Be Left Out", but said Powderfinger sacrificed their uniqueness on "Good Day Ray", which Lewis argued was heavily Foo Fighters influenced. Lewis approved of the "melodic" "Already Gone", while Juice's Simon Wooldridge said it and "Passenger" demonstrated Powderfinger's "flair for the big hook".

Beat's Neala Johnson compared the album's political motifs to the Manic Street Preachers—"an earnest, sometimes cynical, social and personal conscience displayed in the lyrics". Noel Mangel of The Courier-Mail said it had "a lightness of touch and boisterous spirit", especially compared to the distorted guitars on debut album Parables for Wooden Ears. MS Queensland's Lauren McKay said the album ranked up there with the best of Bon Jovi and Robbie Williams. Time Off's Geoff Nicholson said Internationalist was "a blend of shimmering pop songs and thought-provoking probing".

In December of 2021, the album was listed at no. 18 in Rolling Stone Australia’s ‘200 Greatest Albums of All Time’ countdown.

== Track listing ==
Tracks on the album are as follows:

1. "Hindley Street" (Fanning, Powderfinger) – 3:41
2. "Belter" (Fanning, Powderfinger) – 4:13
3. "The Day You Come" (Fanning, Powderfinger) – 4:00
4. "Already Gone" (Fanning, Powderfinger) – 3:28
5. "Passenger" (Fanning, Powderfinger) – 4:20
6. "Don't Wanna Be Left Out" (Fanning, Middleton, Powderfinger) – 2:12
7. "Good-Day Ray" (Coghill, Fanning, Powderfinger) – 1:58
8. "Trading Places" (Fanning, Powderfinger) – 4:27
9. "Private Man" (Fanning, Powderfinger) – 3:40
10. "Celebrity Head" (Fanning, Powderfinger) – 2:20
11. "Over My Head" (Middleton) – 1:36
12. "Capoicity" (Fanning, Powderfinger) – 5:44
13. "Lemon Sunrise" (Fanning, Middleton, Powderfinger) – 3:34

=== P2K bonus disc ===
The second release of pressings of the album were released in late November 1998 which included a bonus disc featuring a live recording of Powderfinger's performance at the Sydney Opera House 25th birthday celebration on 11 October 1998.

1. "Passenger" – 4:42
2. "Private Man" – 4:01
3. "Don't Wanna Be Left Out" – 2:55
4. "Pick You Up" – 5:51
5. "The Day You Come" – 4:36

== Charts ==
=== Weekly charts ===
Chart (1998–2018)	Peak position
Australian Albums (ARIA)	1

=== Year-end charts ===
Chart (1998)	Position
Australia (ARIA) Albums	66
Australian Artist Albums Chart	14
Chart (1999)	Position
Australia (ARIA) Albums	17
Australian Artist Albums Chart	4
Chart (2000)	Position
Australia (ARIA) Albums	48
Australian Artist Albums Chart	15

=== Certifications ===
Region	Certification	Certified units/sales
Australia (ARIA)	5× Platinum	350,000^{^}
^{^} Shipments figures based on certification alone.

== Personnel ==
- Bernard Fanning – vocals, guitars, piano, keyboards
- Darren Middleton – backing vocals, guitars, piano, keyboards, lead vocal on Over My Head
- Ian Haug – guitar, handclaps, backing vocals
- John Collins – bass guitar, bass and organ pedals, backing vocals
- Jon Coghill – drums, percussion, handclaps, backing vocals
- Tiddas – backing vocals
- Nick DiDia – production, engineering, mixing
- Lachlan "Magoo" Goold, Mark McElligott – additional engineering
- Craig Kamber – A&R
- Michael Mucci – artwork
- Sophie Howarth – photography

== Accolades ==
=== ARIA Awards ===
Internationalist and singles from it have been nominated to win ARIA Music Awards from the Australian Recording Industry Association (ARIA) in two consecutive years.

Year	Work	Award	Result
1999	Internationalist	Best Cover Art	Won
1999	Internationalist	Best Rock Album	Won
1999	Internationalist	Album of the Year	Won
1999	Internationalist	Best Group	Nominated
1999	"The Day You Come"	Single of the Year	Won
2000	"Passenger"	Best Cover Art	Nominated
2000	"Passenger"	Best Group	Nominated
2000	"Passenger"	Single of the Year	Nominated

=== Other awards ===
In 1999, "The Day You Come" was nominated to win the "Song of the Year" APRA Award from the Australasian Performing Right Association, and "Passenger" won the same award the following year. The same year, the tracks "Already Gone", "Good-Day Ray" and "Passenger" all featured in Triple J's Hottest 100 list, and "Don't Wanna Be Left Out" and "The Day You Come" featured in the list in 1998. Australian music magazine Juice selected Internationalist as #80 of their top 100 albums of the 1990s. In September 2018, Australian radio station Double J selected Internationalist as the number one Australian album of the 90s

== See also ==
- Powderfinger albums
- Full discography
