= Santa Monica (Everclear song) =

1995 single by Everclear

Single by Everclear

from the album Sparkle and Fade
- B-side: "Heroin Girl" (live)
- Released: September 19, 1995
- Genre: Alternative rock; grunge
- Length: 3:11
- Label: Capitol
- Songwriters: Art Alexakis; Greg Eklund; Craig Montoya
- Producer: Art Alexakis

Everclear singles chronology
| "Heroin Girl" (1995) | "Santa Monica" (1995) | "Heartspark Dollarsign" (1996) |

Music video
- "Santa Monica" on YouTube

"Santa Monica" (subtitled "Watch the World Die" in Europe) is a song by American rock band Everclear from their second studio album, Sparkle and Fade (1995). The song was written by the band's lead singer, Art Alexakis, and was sent to US rock radio in September 1995. Though it was not commercially released as a single in the United States, radio stations played "Santa Monica" enough for it to reach number 29 on the Billboard Hot 100 Airplay chart and number one the Billboard Album Rock Tracks chart for three weeks in 1996. It became a top-40 hit in Australia, Canada, New Zealand, and the United Kingdom; it is the band's highest-charting single in Australia.

== Background and content ==
In an October 2003 interview with Songfacts, Alexakis explained the song:

I'm using a place where I grew up and palm trees as iconic references. It's what I grew up with. I grew up in a seaside town called Santa Monica, which is like L.A. but on the coast. I've lived in cold places and been in bad relationships, and I think everybody has a place in their mind that is like a safe haven. It's also about getting away from bad times ... the ending of something is also the beginning of something new, whether it's with someone or getting out of a bad job, a bad way of life or an abusive relationship.

When Alexakis was a teenager, his girlfriend committed suicide; shortly thereafter, Alexakis attempted the same by jumping off the Santa Monica Pier in southern California. Following the terrorist attacks on September 11, 2001, the song was placed on the list of post-9/11 inappropriate songs distributed by Clear Channel Communications.

== Track listings ==
UK limited-edition 7-inch red vinyl single

A1. "Santa Monica (Watch the World Die)"
A2. "American Girl" (Tom Petty cover, KDGE version)
B1. "Fire Maple Song" (KDGE version)
B2. "Strawberry" (KDGE version)

UK CD1

1. "Santa Monica (Watch the World Die)"
2. "Heroin Girl" (KDGE version)
3. "Summerland" (KDGE version)
4. "Sin City" (AC/DC cover)

UK CD2

1. "Santa Monica (Watch the World Die)"
2. "Strawberry" (KDGE version)
3. "Fire Maple Song" (KDGE version)
4. "American Girl" (Tom Petty cover, KDGE version)

European maxi-CD single

1. "Santa Monica (Watch the World Die)"
2. "Heroin Girl" (acoustic version)
3. "Happy Hour" (demo)
4. "Sin City" (AC/DC cover)

Dutch maxi-CD single

1. "Santa Monica (Watch the World Die)"
2. "Strawberry" (live)
3. "Fire Maple Song" (live)
4. "Santa Monica (Watch the World Die)" (live)

Australian CD single

1. "Santa Monica" (album version)
2. "Heroin Girl" (acoustic version)
3. "Don't Change" (INXS cover)
4. "Sin City" (AC/DC cover)

== Charts ==
=== Weekly charts ===
| Chart (1996) | Peak position |
|---|---|
| Australia (ARIA) | 25 |
| Canada Top Singles (RPM) | 40 |
| Canada Rock/Alternative (RPM) | 4 |
| New Zealand (Recorded Music NZ) | 27 |
| Scottish Singles Sales (Official Charts) | 39 |
| UK Singles (Official Charts) | 40 |
| US Radio Songs (Billboard) | 29 |
| US Alternative Airplay (Billboard) | 5 |
| US Mainstream Rock (Billboard) | 1 |
| US Pop Airplay (Billboard) | 35 |

=== Year-end charts ===
| Chart (1996) | Position |
|---|---|
| Australia (ARIA) | 82 |
| US Mainstream Rock Tracks (Billboard) | 2 |
| US Modern Rock Tracks (Billboard) | 5 |

== Release history ==
| Region | Date | Format(s) | Label(s) | Ref. |
|---|---|---|---|---|
| United States | September 19, 1995 | Rock radio | Capitol | |
| United Kingdom | August 19, 1996 | 7-inch vinyl; CD | Capitol | |
