= California Wives =

American indie band

- Origin: Chicago, Illinois, United States
- Genres: Indie pop, indie rock
- Years active: 2009-present
- Label: Vagrant Records
- Members: Jayson Kramer; Hans Michel; Graham Masell; Joe O'Connor
- Past members: Dan Zima

California Wives are an American band from Chicago, formed in 2009. The band released its debut full-length CD, Art History, on Vagrant Records in October 2012.

== Members ==
Current

- Jayson Kramer - vocals, bass, guitar, keyboards
- Hans Michel - guitar
- Graham Masell - guitar
- Joe O'Connor - drums

Former

- Dan Zima - bass

== Discography ==
=== Albums ===
Title	Album details
Art History	Released: October 2, 2012; Label: Vagrant Records; Formats: CD, LP, Digital download

Title	Album details
Heavy	Release: July 23, 2015; Label: HOMHOMHOM; Formats: LP, Digital download
