= Double Allergic =

Studio album by Powderfinger
- Released: 2 September 1996
- Recorded: 1995–1996
- Studio: Q (Sydney); Sunshine (Brisbane)
- Genre: Alternative rock
- Length: 55:33
- Label: Polydor
- Producer: Tim Whitten & Powderfinger

Powderfinger chronology
Mr Kneebone (1995)	Double Allergic (1996)	Internationalist (1998)

Singles from Double Allergic
- 1. "Pick You Up" Released: 13 April 1996; 2. "D.A.F." Released: 5 August 1996; 3. "Living Type" Released: 11 November 1996; 4. "Take Me In" Released: 12 May 1997

Professional ratings
Review scores
Source	Rating
Allmusic	link
Juice	(positive) link

Double Allergic is the second studio album by Australian alternative rock band Powderfinger. Released in Australia on 2 September 1996 Polydor, the album was produced by Tim Whitten and widely considered Powderfinger's mainstream breakthrough.

Four singles were released from the album: "Pick You Up", "D.A.F.", "Living Type" and "Take Me In". "Pick You Up" was the most successful single from the album, and Powderfinger's first moderate success, reaching #23 on the ARIA charts. "D.A.F." also charted as a moderate success; it reached #39 on the Australian music charts. Both "Living Type" and "Take Me In" did not chart officially, but "Living Type" was voted into the Triple J Hottest 100 in 1996.

Critics were generally favorable in their reviews of Double Allergic. It was praised by Allmusic reviewer Jonathan Lewis as "a cohesive and mature effort". It has also been certified platinum three times, with over 200,000 copies sold. Double Allergic was also nominated for five ARIA awards, with singles from the album nominated for an additional four, however, it won none of the awards it was nominated for.

== Recording and production ==
Double Allergic contained material that had been written by Powderfinger in 1995 and 1996. Prior to its release, guitarist Darren Middleton described it as "by far the best thing we've done", an analogy that would be often made when comparing the album to its predecessor, Parables for Wooden Ears. Middleton praised the album because the band knew how they wanted the record to sound before they began to record; he also described it as "the most concise continuation of who we are down on record".

Lead singer Bernard Fanning noted that another important element of the album was that there "was more space in the songs, it wasn't overcrowded". However, Fanning commented that Powderfinger had not intended to greatly change their sound in creating Double Allergic, instead, the change in sound came as a natural progression. the guitarist Ian Haug agreed, stating the music was "more melodic and sort of simpler", without "so many different time signatures and things". Rolling Stone author Tracey Grimson also commented on this, stating that "Powderfinger have become practical advocates of space" and lauding their acknowledgment that the "absence of sound can be lush, evocative". She noted that even in the "rockers" on the album songs—like "Pick You Up" and "Skinny Jean"—the band were still able to pull back and give the songs additional space.

Powderfinger spent less money producing Double Allergic than on their previous works. Previously, the band had worked with Tony Cohen, whom Fanning stated was expensive due to his success in the industry. For Double Allergic the band chose Tim Whitten, a less well known producer, and because the band knew what they intended to do as they entered the studio they managed to spend less despite the improved sound. Middleton commented on Whitten's capabilities in the recording studio, saying "He's what a band looks for in a producer/engineer, because he's got his own ideas", but stating that Whitten would also listen to and appreciate the band's ideas.

== Album and single releases ==
Double Allergic was released on 2 September 1996 in Australia on the Polydor record label. It entered the ARIA chart at #7, and spent ten weeks in the top ten. Over 200,000 copies were sold, and the album is currently certified 3× platinum, asserting at least 210,000 sales. The album finished 1996 at #44 on the ARIA end of year albums chart, and finished 1997 at #53.

"Pick You Up", the first single, was released on 13 April 1996, and entered the ARIA singles chart at #34. By its fifth week, on 30 June, it had reached its peak at #23 – it spent a further seven weeks on the chart before dropping out. "Pick You Up" was described as having a "very professional sound". The song appeared at #6 on the Triple J Hottest 100, 1996. "D.A.F.", the second single, was released on 5 August 1996. It spent four weeks on the ARIA chart, peaking at #39. The title of the song was taken from its chord progression, in the words of the bass guitarist John Collins "because we were stupid". The song appeared at #18 on the Triple J Hottest 100, 1996.

"Living Type" was the third single, released on 11 November 1996. The song peaked at #42 on the ARIA charts and stayed in the top 50 for three weeks. "Living Type" was written by Fanning about the Manson Family cult, and came with an X-Files style music video. The song appeared at #32 on the Triple J Hottest 100, 1996. The fourth single, "Take Me In", was released on 12 May 1997. It failed to chart, and was the least noted single from the album. Fanning wrote "Take Me In" as a response to hypocrisy by police, which he had read about in newspapers.

The album contains three secret tracks placed onto the twelfth track after silence that follows the track's primary song "(The Return of) The Electric Horseman". The first of these is called "Vladimir" which, according to Fanning is about a transvestite. The second song is called "SS" which refers to British cricket bat manufacturer Stuart Surridge, which is often known by those initials. The song refers in part to the bat itself, though mostly to cricket in general, with lyrics "Then we'll race like jets for the fading moon; Then we all fall down", which refers to running for the opposite crease following striking the ball, and then diving to the ground to secure the run. The third and final secret track is called "Come Away" which also appeared as a B-side for the single of "Pick You Up". In a first for the group, it had the guitarist Darren Middleton as lead vocalist, while a spoken sound sample at the end of the song is the bass guitarist John Collins' voice.

== Critical reception ==
Double Allergic was well received by Allmusic, with reviewer Jonathan Lewis claiming that Powderfinger "managed to successfully create an album of melodic pop songs coupled with noisy guitars". The album was summarised as "a cohesive and mature effort".

Sputnikmusic reviewer blueyxd, had mixed feelings about the album. The level of experimentation in the album was praised, with the reviewer stating that "the instrument playing and some of the unusual styles used" were beneficial. However, the main concern was that there wasn't enough experimentation, and that the album was rather "solid", thus earning it its score of 3.5.

Juice magazine reviewed Double Allergic positively, calling it a much more mature album than its predecessor, Parables for Wooden Ears. The "band's mellowing tone", compared to the "aggression" in past works, was also commended, with the review stating that "the result is an album filled with potential and character". The experimentation on "JC", "Glimpse" and "Oipic" was again praised, with comparisons to Motown drawn. The review summarised the album as "proof of a band maturing, streets ahead of anything they've previously recorded".

== Track listing ==
All music written and arranged by Powderfinger. All lyrics by Fanning, except "Boing Boing" lyrics by Fanning/Haug, "JC" & "Come Away" lyrics by Middleton, "Take Me In" & "(Return Of) The Electric Horseman" lyrics by Fanning/Middleton.

1. "Skinny Jean" – 3:57
2. "Turtle's Head" – 3:23
3. "Pick You Up" – 4:19
4. "D.A.F." – 3:30
5. "Boing Boing" – 3:37
6. "Give" – 2:28
7. "Oipic" – 4:09
8. "Living Type" – 3:25
9. "JC" – 2:50
10. "Glimpse" – 1:43
11. "Take Me In" – 2:51
12. "(Return of) The Electric Horseman" – 18:57 (actual track time 3:47)
- Hidden tracks (included in 18:57 track time):
  - "Vladimir" – 4:47
  - "SS" – 3:26
  - "Come Away" – 3:55

== Charts ==
=== Weekly charts ===
Chart (1996–97)	Peak position
Australian Albums (ARIA)	4

=== Year-end charts ===
Chart (1996)	Position
Australian Albums Chart	44
Australian Artist Albums Chart	6
Chart (1997)	Position
Australian Albums Chart	53
Australian Artist Albums Chart	12

== Certifications ==
Region	Certification	Certified units/sales
Australia (ARIA)	3× Platinum	210,000^{^}
^{^} Shipments figures based on certification alone.

== Accolades ==
Year	Award	Album/Single	Result
1997	Album of the Year	Double Allergic	Nominated
1997	Highest Selling Album	Double Allergic	Nominated
1997	Best Alternative Release	Double Allergic	Nominated
1997	Producer of the Year	Double Allergic	Nominated
1997	Best Group	Double Allergic	Nominated
1997	Single of the Year	"D.A.F."	Nominated
1997	Song of the Year	"D.A.F."	Nominated
1996	Single of the Year	"Pick You Up"	Nominated
1996	Song of the Year	"Pick You Up"	Nominated
