= Art History (album) =

Studio album by California Wives
- Released: October 2, 2012
- Recorded: 2012
- Genres: Indie pop, new wave
- Label: Vagrant Records

Professional ratings
Aggregate scores
Source	Rating
Metacritic	65/100
Review scores
Source	Rating
AllMusic	3.5/5 stars
Paste	7.5/10
Prefix Magazine	5.5/10
Consequence of Sound	2.5/5 stars
The Ithacan	3/5 stars

Art History is the 2012 debut album of Chicago indie pop quartet California Wives. It was released in October 2012 on Vagrant Records.

In an interview with Billboard, the band's vocalist and guitarist, Jayson Kramer, explained that the album was recorded in early 2012 in New York City with the help of Claudius Mittendorfer, who has worked with Muse, Interpol and Neon Indian.

== Track listing ==
No.	Title	Length
1.	"Blood Red Youth"	4:18
2.	"Tokyo"	3:51
3.	"Marianne"	4:15
4.	"The Fisher King"	3:57
5.	"Los Angeles"	3:51
6.	"Photolights"	2:51
7.	"Purple"	2:40
8.	"Better Home"	5:18
9.	"Twenty Three"	4:00
10.	"The New Process"	3:55
11.	"Light Year"	4:32
