= Vulture Street (album) =

Studio album by Powderfinger
- Released: 4 July 2003
- Recorded: 2003
- Genre: Rock
- Length: 44:21
- Label: Universal Music
- Producer: Nick DiDia

Powderfinger chronology
Odyssey Number Five (2000)	Vulture Street (2003)	Fingerprints: The Best of Powderfinger (2004)

Singles from Vulture Street
- 1. "(Baby I've Got You) On My Mind" Released: 16 June 2003; 2. "Love Your Way" Released: 25 May 2004; 3. "Sunsets" Released: 4 January 2004; 4. "Since You've Been Gone" Released: 22 March 2004

Vulture Street is the fifth studio album by Australian alternative rock band Powderfinger, released on 4 July 2003 by Universal Music. It won the 2003 ARIA Music Award for Best Rock Album. Produced by Nick DiDia, Vulture Street was certified platinum, and spent 47 weeks on the ARIA Charts and peaked at #1. Singles from the album included "(Baby I've Got You) On My Mind", "Since You've Been Gone", "Love Your Way" and "Sunsets".

The album received nominations for ARIA Awards in five different categories in 2003, which included "Album of the Year", "Best Group" and "Best Rock Album". Vulture Street also received the award for "Best Cover Art", which featured Czech supermodel Eva Herzigová.

Vulture Street was described by certain critics as "a rawer, louder, but by no means unrefined" album. The title of the album was taken from an iconic street in the inner southern suburbs of Brisbane, Queensland, the city in which all Powderfinger members grew up.

== Background, recording and production ==
Following their last record, the highly successful Odyssey Number Five, the band agreed that they wanted to continue in their musical careers, but wanted to have more fun with it. They were no longer dole reliant, as they had been when they made their debut album, Parables for Wooden Ears. Drummer Jon Coghill told The Sydney Morning Herald "we wanted to have more fun and enjoy that we were a band, rather than chase what you're supposed to do", and guitarist Ian Haug said "We all found that this is really important to us, but we wanted to make it more fun".

Powderfinger did not enter the recording studio with a specific plan on what they wanted Vulture Street to be, but that they "felt that [they] wanted to write a rock album". In the end, the album became "stuff that makes you want to jump around and feel good about yourself"—guitarist Darren Middleton said this had not been the band's intention. Coghill said the band wanted to make an album that was fun to perform live and listen to—most of the songs on the album were performed and released live on These Days: Live in Concert.

Like Powderfinger's two previous albums, Vulture Street was produced by Nick DiDia. It was mixed by Brendan O'Brien, who had worked with Powderfinger inspiration Neil Young. The album was recorded over a seven-week period in Sydney. Prior to recording, the band had written about 50 songs, which was trimmed to the final 11. A significant number of songs on the album were producing during jam sessions, with DiDia giving the band additional space to move in. Middleton said in an interview that the band "always start things spontaneously, because that's when you're thinking less and just playing."

In producing Vulture Street, Powderfinger moved in a different direction to their previous works, especially Odyssey Number Five, starting with opening song "Rockin' Rocks", which was written, according to Middleton, after "a couple of months trying really hard to write this new rock album" but not making anything they really liked. He also said the band could easily have written many "The Metre"–like songs but didn't do that "for our own interest in the band and music".

In an interview with ninemsn, lead singer Bernard Fanning said the band "tapped more into that energetic rock thing and made it really different from our other albums" when creating Vulture Street. He also said the band were a lot more serious when making this album, and this was partly due to "the way we've matured as musicians".

== Album and single releases ==
Vulture Street was released on 29 July 2003 in Australia, with the band launching the album at the Tivoli nightclub on 52 Costin Street Fortitude Valley, Brisbane. A special edition DVD was included with selected early copies of Vulture Street. The DVD included a documentary with all of the albums' songs and several music videos. Vulture Street entered the ARIA Charts in Australia at #1, and the RIANZ Charts in New Zealand at #17.

Vulture Street's first single, "(Baby I've Got You) On My Mind", was released in June 2003. It entered the ARIA charts at #9 on 29 June 2003, and spent 13 weeks in the top 50. The song was nominated for "Song of the Year" and "Best Video" at the 2003 ARIA Awards, but won neither. "Love Your Way" was released as the second single from Vulture Street, and spent two weeks on the ARIA charts, entering at #37.

The third single, "Sunsets", was released in January 2004. It earned the band a nomination for "Best Group" at the 2004 ARIA Awards, but again was unsuccessful. "Sunsets" charted better than most of its predecessors, reaching number 11 on the ARIA Chart, and entering the RIANZ Chart in New Zealand at number 38, the first single from Vulture Street to do so. The fourth and final single, "Since You've Been Gone", was released in March 2004. It wasn't as successful as its predecessors, and failed to make the ARIA top 50. "Since You've Been Gone" was written by Fanning as a tribute to his brother.

== Music and lyrics ==
The music on Vulture Street was more rock orientated than Powderfinger's past work, especially Odyssey Number Five. The opening track, "Rockin' Rocks", was described by Harp as "far too cheesy to open this record—or any record, for that matter". The song became the band's opening track for live performances, though. The first single, "(Baby I've Got You) On My Mind", was one of the heavier songs on the album; varying reviewers alikened it to AC/DC, Bad Company, and Stereophonics, and musicOMH called it "an unashamed full-tilt rocker". dB magazine said the title of "Stumblin'", released as a single from These Days: Live in Concert after appearing on Vulture Street, was representative of the "classic rock clichés" on the album.

Second single "Since You've Been Gone" contained similar lyrical features to "(Baby I've Got You) On My Mind", but with a more mellow sound. Fanning wrote it following the death of his brother, to help deal with the event. "Sunsets" also dealt with this theme; Fanning told MTV Scene "we write unashamedly about that emotional attachment". "Love Your Way" saw an acoustic opening followed by a loud chorus for which Universal Music Canada recommended the air guitar. musicOMH's Simon Evans alikened the song to Roy Harper, while David Welsh praised the three main aspects of the song—the acoustic introduction, "affected vocal delivery", and guitar solo. On live performances, Fanning plays "Love Your Way" with an acoustic guitar to give the loud second phase of the song more "oomph".

== Reception ==
Professional ratings
Review scores
Source	Rating
AllMusic	link
The Sydney Morning Herald	link

Vulture Street was generally received well by critics. AllMusic's Jason MacNeil gave the album four stars, stating the opening notes of the album had a "great rock flavor to them". He described "(Baby I've Got You) On My Mind" as reminiscent of "Stereophonics rehashing old-school rock for a contemporary feeling", and said "Since You've Been Gone" was an "uplifting gospel-tinged effort". MacNeil's main criticism was for "Roll Right By You", a song he described as "run-of-the-mill". However, MacNeil said that overall the album was "an outstanding piece of work".

The Sydney Morning Herald's Bernard Zuel approved of the album, giving it four stars, and calling Vulture Street a "rawer, louder, but by no means unrefined, album". He said that throughout the album, guitarists Darren Middleton and Ian Haug "dominated in a way they haven't since their 1994 debut, Parables for Wooden Ears". Zuel drew several connections to Powderfinger's early work, but noted "a superior intellect" in this album. Zuel summarised by saying it was easy to "just enjoy Vulture Street's power and passion. And the rock."

Ty Burr of Entertainment Weekly reviewed the album positively, writing of a return to Powderfinger's "bar-band roots", while still featuring some "sharp pop hooks under the riffs". He drew references to early Radiohead and Bad Company, whom he argued Fanning was inspired by on "(Baby I've Got You) On My Mind". The review was summarised by Burr describing Vulture Street as "good company".

MusicOMH reviewer Simon Evans said Powderfinger added "a real punch to songs...far removed from your standard rock and roll fare" in Vulture Street, praising the emotion and seriousness of "Since You've Been Gone" and "How Far Have We Really Come?", and the "fun" in "Don't Panic". Evans praised producer Nick DiDia for his work on the album, which he summarised as "a quantum leap from its rather passionless predecessor, Odyssey Number Five".

=== Accolades ===
Vulture Street received numerous nominations for ARIA Music Awards from the Australian Recording Industry Association (ARIA) in 2003 and 2004. To date, the album has received eight nominations in six categories, four of which they had won the award for.

ARIA Award nominations for Vulture Street
Year	Award	Work	Result
2003	Album of the Year	Vulture Street	Won
2003	Best Group	Vulture Street	Won
2003	Best Rock Album	Vulture Street	Won
2003	Best Cover Art	Vulture Street	Won
2003	Highest Selling Album	Vulture Street	Nominated
2003	Song of the Year	"(Baby I've Got You) On My Mind"	Nominated
2003	Best Video	"(Baby I've Got You) On My Mind"	Nominated
2004	Best Group	"Sunsets"	Nominated

== Track listing ==
All songs written by John Collins, Ian Haug, Bernard Fanning, Jon Coghill & Darren Middleton

=== CD ===
1. "Rockin' Rocks" – 3:04
2. "(Baby I've Got You) On My Mind" – 3:20
3. "Since You've Been Gone" – 4:12
4. "Love Your Way" – 4:31
5. "Sunsets" – 3:49
6. "Don't Panic" – 3:09
7. "Stumblin'" – 3:46
8. "Roll Right by You" – 4:15
9. "How Far Have We Really Come?" – 4:00
10. "Pockets" – 5:46
11. "A Song Called Everything" – 4:23

=== Vulture Street Blues ===
A special edition DVD was included with selected early copies of Vulture Street. The DVD included a documentary with all of the album's songs, with the song "Sunsets" featuring twice. The DVD also included the music videos for "On My Mind", the acoustic version of "Sunsets" and as hidden bonus features, the videos for the song "Pockets" and the keyboard version of "These Days".

1. Documentary
  1. "Sunsets"
  2. "Rockin Rocks"
  3. "Stumblin'"
  4. "Pockets"
  5. "On My Mind"
  6. "Since You've Been Gone"
  7. "Sunsets"
  8. "Love Your Way"
  9. "Don't Panic"
  10. "How Far Have We Really Come?"
  11. "Rita"
2. "On My Mind" (video)
3. "Sunsets" (acoustic video)
4. Hidden extras:
  - "Pockets" (video)
  - "These Days" (keyboard version)

== Personnel ==
Powderfinger

- Bernard Fanning – vocals and guitar
- Darren Middleton – guitar, backing vocals and keyboard
- Ian Haug – guitar and backing vocals
- John Collins – bass guitar
- Jon Coghill – drums and percussion

Additional players

- Tony Reyes – keyboards, guitar and backing vocals
- Shauna Jensen and Maggie McKinney – backing vocals
- Lachlan Doley – hammond organ and piano
- Nick DiDia – tambourine and anüsaphone

Production

- Nick DiDia – producer, engineer
- Tony Reyes – producer
- Brendan O'Brien – mixer
- Anton Hagop – additional engineer
- Catherine Claire – assistant engineer
- Paul Piticco, Brian Quinn, Annette Perkins, Janne Scott and Jean Reid – managers
- Steven Gorrow – art and direction
- Christopher Morris – photographer

== Charts ==
=== Weekly charts ===
Weekly chart performance for Vulture Street
Chart (2003–2005)	Peak position
Australian Albums (ARIA)	1
New Zealand Albums (RMNZ)	17

=== Year-end charts ===
2003 year-end chart performance for Vulture Street
Chart (2003)	Position
Australian Albums (ARIA)	4

2004 year-end chart performance for Vulture Street
Chart (2004)	Position
Australian Albums (ARIA)	26

=== Decade-end chart ===
Decade-end chart performance for Vulture Street
Chart (2000–2009)	Position
Australian Albums (ARIA)	25

== Certifications ==
Certifications for Vulture Street
Region	Certification	Certified units/sales
Australia (ARIA)	6× Platinum	420,000^{^}
^{^} Shipments figures based on certification alone.

== Release history ==
Release history for Vulture Street
Country	Release date
Australia	4 July 2003
United Kingdom	6 October 2003
Canada	13 April 2004
United States	9 November 2004

== See also ==
- Full discography
