= Burn Your Name =

Single by Powderfinger

from the album Golden Rule
- B-side: "See Me Coming"
- Released: 18 December 2009 (Australia)
- Recorded: Byron Bay, New South Wales
- Genre: Alternative rock
- Length: 3:50
- Label: Universal
- Songwriter(s): Bernard Fanning, Darren Middleton, Ian Haug, John Collins and Jon Coghill
- Producer(s): Nick DiDia

Powderfinger singles chronology
"All of the Dreamers" (2009)	"Burn Your Name" (2009)	"Sail the Wildest Stretch" (2010)

"Burn Your Name" is the second single off the band's seventh and final album Golden Rule. The song was written by Powderfinger and the music video features the band in Thailand.

== Music video ==
The music video was filmed during the Yi Ping festival, part of the Loy Krathong festival held on the 12th full moon every year. Rice paper lanterns are lit and fill the night sky like a constellation.

== Track listing ==
No.	Title	Length
1.	"Burn Your Name"	3:50
2.	"See Me Coming"	3:27

== Charts ==
Chart (2009/10)	Peak position
Australia (ARIA)	45
