= Sail the Wildest Stretch =

2010 song performed by Powderfinger

Single by Powderfinger

from the album Golden Rule
- Released: 30 April 2010
- Recorded: Byron Bay, New South Wales
- Genre: Alternative rock
- Length: 4:09
- Label: Universal
- Songwriter(s): Bernard Fanning; Darren Middleton; Ian Haug; John Collins; Jon Coghill
- Producer(s): Nick DiDia

Powderfinger singles chronology
"Burn Your Name" (2009)	"Sail the Wildest Stretch" (2010)	"Iberian Dream" (2010)

"Sail the Wildest Stretch" is the third single from Golden Rule by alternative rock band Powderfinger.

On 15 May 2010, "Sail the Wildest Stretch" was used as the credit song to the special Australian program featured on Channel 9 titled Homecoming, of Jessica Watson's successful attempt at becoming the youngest person to sail around the world. The song's lyrics and sounds fit Jessica Watson's profile, hard work, idolism, and compassion of herself and her 7 months of sailing throughout the world. The song was featured at the end of the program when showing flashbacks of her voyage and words spoken by reporters/family.

== Track listing ==
No.	Title	Length
1.	"Sail the Wildest Stretch" (M Brauer Radio Edit with Wave at Front)	3:39
2.	"Sail the Wildest Stretch" (music video)	3:51

== Charts ==
Chart (2010)	Peak position
Australia (ARIA)	51
