= Paul Piticco =

Australian music manager

- Born: Paul Piticco; 7 March 1969 (age 57); Brisbane, Australia
- Occupations: Music promoter, Music manager, A&R executive

Paul Piticco (born 7 March 1969) is an Australian music and hospitality entrepreneur best known for managing the Australian rock band Powderfinger and co-founding the Australian music festival Splendour In The Grass. He is also the founder of independent record labels Dew Process and Create/Control, and is the CEO of Secret Sounds, a live event promotion and artist management company operating under Live Nation Entertainment.

== Early life and education ==
Piticco was born an only child to Sernando and Carmel Piticco in Brisbane, Australia. His father, Sernando, an Italian immigrant who relocated to Australia at a young age, established a construction business in Brisbane, while his mother, Carmel, worked part-time in nursing and education. Piticco attended Petrie Terrace State School while growing up and later attended Kelvin Grove State High.

Piticco's first job was as a paperboy selling The Telegraph. He targeted customers at a former Arnott's biscuit factory on Coronation Drive during shift changeovers, a strategy that maximised sales with minimal effort, and built a regular clientele by presenting newspapers with the sports section or horoscopes already facing up.

In his mid-teens, Piticco worked weekend night shifts at the 24-hour Windmill Food Bar in Petrie Terrace, Brisbane, an experience he has credited with teaching him patience when dealing with intoxicated patrons, a skill he later applied while working in bars, music venues and festivals as the manager of Powderfinger. He completed Year 10 at Kelvin Grove State High School but left partway through the following year, attributing his declining interest in study to his discovery of marijuana and alcohol.

== Career ==
After leaving high school, Piticco started working with his father at the family construction business. Piticco then moved onto employment as a steel salesperson for Boral Limited. It was during this period that Piticco was asked to manage Powderfinger. The band sought the assistance of a lawyer to devise a management contract that determined a six-way split for any money that was earned by Powderfinger beyond the actual songwriting—the band continued working with Piticco after the contract lapsed, but did not bother to create another contract, and this arrangement lasted for the majority of Powderfinger's 20-year career.

in 2012, The Australian published a list of the top 50 most influential Australians in the "Arts" field. Additionally, he has appeared several times within the top 5 of the Australasian Music Industry Directory (AMID) Power 50 rankings.

Pittico is the founder of Secret Service Artist Management, which manages four Australian musical acts: Bernard Fanning, The Grates, Powderfinger and Mosman Alder. The company previously managed Magic Dirt, Yves Klein Blue, Dan Brodie, Turtlebox and Not From There.

Co-founded by Piticco with his partners Jessica Ducrou and Kristy Rosser, Secret Sounds Connect are the exclusive commercial rights agents for Australia's top festivals including Splendour in the Grass; St Jerome's Laneway Festival; Falls Festival; Fuzzy Events (Listen Out, Harbourlife, Field Day); and Southbound Festival.

== Festivals and touring ==
Secret Sounds promotes the tours of several international artists in Australia, including The Strokes, Mumford & Sons, London Grammar, Foster The People, James Blake, Mark Ronson, The Flaming Lips, Blur and many more. In 2007, Piticco co-promoted the "Across the Great Divide Tour", a tour headlined by popular Australian bands, Powderfinger and Silverchair. The carbon neutral tour promoted reconciliation in Australia and contributed to the reduction of the 17-year gap in life expectancy between Indigenous and non-indigenous Australians.

In 2010, Piticco co-promoted the farewell tour of Powderfinger that signified the completion of the band's career. The "Sunsets Farewell Tour" consisted of performances in 34 cities and towns around Australia, after 300,000 tickets were sold. Piticco was also a producer for the band's final commercial DVD, Sunsets Farewell Tour, directed by Gregor Jordan. The farewell tour eventually grossed A$30 million.

Secret Service, along with Byron Bay's Village Sounds, are the co-promoters of Splendour in the Grass, a live music festival held annually in Byron Bay, New South Wales, Australia, since 2001. The festival was temporarily held in Queensland, Australia for a number of years and eventually returned to Byron Bay.

Piticco and associates purchased a site in the North Byron Parklands to secure a permanent location for the festival prior to the 2013 edition.

In September 2012, Piticco announced he would become co-promoter, alongside Splendour in the Grass colleague Ducrou, of the Falls Music and Arts Festival. The announcement came shortly after the resignation of previous staff members Naomi Daly and Carmella Morgan. Piticco expanded the festival to a third location, Byron Bay, in 2013.

== Record labels ==
In 2002, Piticco started Dew Process, an independent record label based in Brisbane, Australia. Dew Process' roster includes London Grammar, Bernard Fanning, Mumford & Sons, James Vincent McMorrow, Sarah Blasko, The Living End, The Hives, The Grates, Bluejuice, The Panics, Jebediah, Last Dinosaurs, Art of Sleeping, Kingswood, Seeker Lover Keeper, Little May and Tkay Maidza. In addition to the label, Dew Process Publishing was founded in 2008 and represents the publishing copyrights of Powderfinger, Art Of Sleeping, and Last Dinosaurs.

In 2012, Piticco launched another record label, Create/Control. Create Control has released music from The Smashing Pumpkins, Cold War Kids, The Jungle Giants, Metric and is the Australian distributor of both the Mute Records and Downtown Records catalogues.

== Hospitality ==
Piticco opened the restaurant and bar Popolo in South Bank, Brisbane in 2011. Piticco's business partners are restaurateur Andrew Baturo, Brian Quinn and Denis Sheahan, Powderfinger's former tour manager.

The Gresham Bar was opened in Brisbane's Queen Street in late 2013. The building in which the bar is located was initially designed for the Queensland National Bank in 1881, and was completed by Queensland Colonial Architect Francis Drummond Greville Stanley in 1885. In 2015, The Gresham Bar was the recipient of several hospitality awards: Australian ‘Bar of the Year’; Qld ‘Bar of the Year’ both awarded at the Australian Bar Awards and Gourmet Travellers’ "Bar of the Year’.

Heya opened its doors in early 2015 and is the third venture to be added to the hospitality portfolio by Piticco and his business partners Baturo, Sheahan and Quinn.

== Personal life ==
Piticco lives with his partner of 20 years, Lisa Wickbold, and their children.
