= All of the Dreamers =

2009 single by Powderfinger

Single by Powderfinger

from the album Golden Rule
- Released: 16 October 2009
- Recorded: Byron Bay, New South Wales
- Genre: Alternative rock
- Length: 3:36
- Label: Universal
- Songwriter(s): Jon Coghill, John Collins, Bernard Fanning, Ian Haug, Darren Middleton
- Producer(s): Nick DiDia

Powderfinger singles chronology
"Who Really Cares (Featuring the Sound of Insanity)" (2008)	"All of the Dreamers" (2009)	"Burn Your Name" (2009)

"All of the Dreamers" is an alternative rock song recorded by Australian alternative rock band Powderfinger. The song was written by Powderfinger and produced by Nick DiDia. It was released as the lead single from Powderfinger's seventh album, Golden Rule, in 2009.

The music video features the band setting up their instruments playing the song within the Brisbane CBD, but blown up to "King-Kong" size. They dwarf the Brisbane CBD skyline then take on other parts of the world. At the end, the band finishes the song while standing on top of Australia.

A brief part of the song was played at the ARIA Music Awards in 2009.

The Head Pictures directed music video was nominated for Best Video at the ARIA Music Awards of 2010.

== Track listing ==
No.	Title	Length
1.	"All of the Dreamers"	3:36
2.	"See You Again"	3:45

== Charts ==
Chart (2009)	Peak position
Australia (ARIA)	23
