= D.A.F. (song) =

Single by Powderfinger

from the album Double Allergic
- Released: 5 August 1996 (Australia)
- Recorded: Sing Sing Studios, Melbourne
- Genre: Alternative rock
- Length: 3:30
- Label: Universal Music Australia
- Songwriters: Jon Coghill, John Collins, Bernard Fanning, Ian Haug, Darren Middleton
- Producer: Tim Whitten

Powderfinger singles chronology
"Pick You Up" (1996)	"D.A.F." (1996)	"Living Type" (1997)

"D.A.F." is a song by Australian alternative rock band Powderfinger, released as a single from their second studio album, Double Allergic, on 5 August 1996.

"D.A.F." reached number 39 on the Australian music chart. The song was doubly nominated in the 1997 ARIA Awards, once for Song of the Year and once for Single of the Year, however won neither.

== History ==
When "D.A.F." was first released, Australian television program Recovery ran a competition asking what the song's title stood for. Powderfinger guitarist Darren Middleton recalls that "people wrote in saying something like Dylan something farts" (referring to then host Dylan Lewis), but Middleton stated that the title was actually the song's chord progression - D, A, F. When asked about the naming of the song, bassist John Collins replied "It's just because we were stupid".

"D.A.F." received healthy radio airplay from numerous mainstream stations including the Today Network. This came as a surprise for the band, as only their previous single, "Pick You Up", had achieved such airplay. Lead singer Bernard Fanning commented that "You can't really control who plays what you do on the radio, so it's pretty weird hearing your song on B105".

Although it was produced as a mainstream song, "D.A.F." was released as a single which included their cover version of the Warumpi Band single, "Blackfella/Whitefella", which was in recognition of Australian Indigenous people. Fanning commented on the band choosing to include the song, saying "we don't set out to preach or give social commentary, but we do have the opportunity to put forward an opinion". He also explained that the topic of social justice was one the band felt strongly about, and that the song had "the perfect lyrics to reflect that opinion".

In a separate interview, with Juice, Fanning said that "D.A.F." centered on "the old theme of searching for truth". He said the song related heavily to the ideal of "being honest with yourself so you can be honest with other people".

== Response ==
"D.A.F."
A 20-second sample from "D.A.F."

"D.A.F." was generally received well by reviewers. Allmusic reviewer Jonathan Lewis commended the song, calling it "superb" and stating it was a "radio staple". Sputnikmusic reviewer blueyxd described "D.A.F." as "quirky" and "straight forward rock", recommending it for those who prefer songs "Plain and simple, Powderfinger like they are these days". Juice stated that "D.A.F." was "driven by dramatic tension".

"D.A.F." was nominated for "Song of the Year" and "Single of the Year" at the 1997 ARIA Awards, but failed to win either. It appeared at #18 on the Triple J Hottest 100 in 1996, and appeared on the CD release. "D.A.F." charted moderately, reaching #39 on the ARIA singles chart, and spending four weeks on the chart.

== Track listing ==
1. "D.A.F." – 3:30
2. "Blackfella/Whitefella"
3. "Ibis"
4. "Pogo Style"

== Charts ==
Chart (1996)	Peak position
Australia (ARIA)	39
