= Transfusion (EP) =

EP by Powderfinger
- Released: 27 September 1993 (Australia)
- Recorded: Red Zeds
- Genre: Rock
- Length: 24:31
- Label: Polydor (859727-2)
- Producer: Powderfinger & Jeff Lovejoy

Powderfinger chronology
Powderfinger (1993)	Transfusion (1993)	Parables for Wooden Ears (1994)

Transfusion is the second EP by the Australian rock group Powderfinger. It was released on 27 September 1993 by Polydor. The album was the group's first recording with Polydor, as the group had signed with the label due to the success of the self-titled previous EP by the band.

The song "Reap What You Sow" is the first song by Powderfinger to have a music video. The EP received minor chart success, though not achieving a mainstream ARIA Singles Chart position. It reached the #1 position on the ARIA Alternative Chart, taking the place of Nirvana's single "Heart-Shaped Box".

== History ==
Transfusion was recorded and produced by Powderfinger and Jeff Lovejoy in 1993 under the Polydor label, at Red Zeds studios in Brisbane. Despite working with Polydor, the group did not sign any contract prior to work on the EP. Says lead singer Bernard Fanning, "We haven’t signed anything... we certainly haven’t signed with them (Polydor)". This statement also refuted rumours that the band had signed with various labels including "Red Eye, Emily, Polydor, and Imago", according to Fanning.

In producing Transfusion, the band aimed to move away from the "sixties" tag that had been placed on them by the musical community. According to Fanning, it is human nature that "you really can’t help but categorise", and this instinct was something the EP attempted to move away from. He went on to say that "it’d be nice, in a perfect world, just to be judged on your own merits", whilst hitting back at those who gave Powderfinger the "sixties" tag by saying that "people that say that aren’t really listening, I think".

== Release ==
=== Publicity ===
In order to publicise the release, Powderfinger decided to film a music video its first track, "Reap What You Sow". The music video was directed by the advertisement director David Barker of Film Headquarters. This work with Barker proved amicable, and lead to the band's following seven music videos also being directed by him. The "Reap What You Sow" video used black-and-white footage of Fanning lying in a creek floating and leaning on rocks. These scenes are intercut with more black-and-white scenes of the band performing the song, in one setting on the side of a mountain overlooking their home city of Brisbane. In another setting, the band is shownin full colour playing live to an audience. Later in the video, the whole band are recreating in the creek seen earlier in the video. The video uses a range of filters and effects, including reversed scenes and visual filters.

=== Response ===
Transfusion replaced "Heart-Shaped Box" by Nirvana at the top of the ARIA alternative music chart in 1993. Despite appearing a notable achievement, Fanning downplayed its significance, telling Rolling Stone magazine, "All it did was make us aware of how few people buy records." He estimated that it had taken 1,000 sales for the EP to top the alternative music chart. Fanning said he hoped that the EP’s chart success would open doors for Powderfinger to play at renowned concerts such as the Big Day Out.

"Reap What You Sow", the opening track on Transfusion, received air time on Triple M in Brisbane, and on Triple J nationwide in Australia. The song topped local community radio station and indie record store charts. It was recognised as "(establishing) the band's tone and moral stance from the outset".

== Track listing ==
All music and lyrics written by Bernard Fanning, John Collins, Ian Haug, Darren Middleton, Jon Coghill.

1. "Reap What You Sow" – 5:29
2. "Change the Tide" – 4:40
3. "Blind to Reason" – 6:11
4. "Mama Harry" – 3:11
5. "Rise Up" – 5:00

== Personnel ==
=== Powderfinger ===
- Bernard Fanning - acoustic guitar and lead vocals
- John Collins - bass guitar
- Ian Haug - electric guitars and backing vocals
- Darren Middleton - electric guitars, Spanish guitar and vocals
- Jon Coghill - drums

=== Production ===
Recorded at Red Zeds Studios, Brisbane by Chumps Productions

- Produced by Powderfinger and Jeff Lovejoy
- Engineered by Jeff Lovejoy and Lachlan "Magoo" Goold

=== Artwork ===
- Sleeve design by Ian Haug, John Collins and Powderfinger
- Graphics and typesetting by Rachel Liddle
- Front cover photo by Ian Haug
- Back cover photo by Ingrid Neilson
- Back cover photo by Tony Mott

== Charts ==
Chart (1993)	Peak position
Australian Alternative Albums (ARIA)]	1
