= Don't Wanna Be Left Out/Good-Day Ray =

"Don't Wanna Be Left Out" and "Good-Day Ray"

Single by Powderfinger

from the album Internationalist
- Released: 9 November 1998
- Recorded: Sing Sing Studios, Melbourne
- Genre: Rock
- Label: Universal

Powderfinger singles chronology
"The Day You Come" (1998)	"Don't Wanna Be Left Out" and "Good-Day Ray" (1998)	"Already Gone" (1998)

"Don't Wanna Be Left Out" and "Good-Day Ray" are songs from Powderfinger's third studio album Internationalist. These songs were released together as a single on 9 November 1998, which reached the top 60 on the ARIA Singles Chart.

== Music video ==
"Don't Wanna Be Left Out"
An 18 second sample from Powderfinger's "Don't Wanna Be Left Out"

Videos were made for both singles. They both featured the band performing in a white room. "Don't Wanna Be Left Out" shows Bernard Fanning wearing extensive makeup and white clothing, whereas "Good-Day Ray" has him in black clothing and with no makeup. He also has long hair, a change from the previous video.

== Track listing ==
1. "Don't Wanna Be Left Out"
2. "Good-Day Ray"
3. "Corner Boy"
4. "Paul's Theme"

== Charts ==
Chart (1998–1999)	Peak position
Australia (ARIA)	59
