= Pick You Up =

Single by Powderfinger

from the album Double Allergic
- Released: 13 April 1996 (Australia)
- Recorded: Sing Sing Studios, Melbourne
- Genre: Alternative rock
- Length: 4:19
- Label: Polydor
- Songwriters: Jon Coghill, John Collins, Bernard Fanning, Ian Haug, Darren Middleton
- Producer: Tim Whitten

Powderfinger singles chronology
"Save Your Skin" (1994)	"Pick You Up" (1996)	"D.A.F." (1996)

"Pick You Up" is the lead single released from Powderfinger's second album Double Allergic. The single was released on 13 April 1996, and was Powderfinger's first moderate success both on commercial and Indie radio stations, and the most successful single from the album reaching #23 on the ARIA Charts. In 2007, eleven years after its initial release, "Pick You Up" was selected to be included in the soundtrack for Australian SBS soccer television program The World Game. The song is the oldest recording on the compilation album.

== History ==
"Pick You Up" was the first release by Powderfinger to receive significant radio airplay. Whilst "Reap What You Sow", off their previous EP; Transfusion, had achieved some success, "Pick You Up" was the first to be played regularly nationwide. Guitarist Darren Middleton said the band were "stoked" with the song's success, saying that "it's great for us because hopefully it'll give us a few more opportunities to do what we want to do." Middleton attributed part of the success of "Pick You Up" to Tim Whitten, producer of the song and Double Allergic, describing Whitten as "what a band looks for in a producer/engineer".

Powderfinger's lead singer, Bernard Fanning, was equally impressed with the radio response to "Pick You Up" and the next single, "D.A.F.". He told Drum Media "it's pretty weird hearing your song on B105", in response to a question about the accessibility of the new album. In another interview, with Juice, Fanning described "Pick You Up" as "a pretty obvious sort of song", calling "D.A.F." the more mysterious single from Double Allergic. Guitarist Ian Haug said it was odd for the band that "Pick You Up" was such a well-known song, when previously "people had known all our stuff equally because we've never had a big radio song." He also said that the song was able to attract new audiences to the band, some of whom would "go home after that song", but others who would develop as the band's new fan base. Despite the increase in popularity, Haug didn't think the band had changed a great deal, saying "I don't think our style has changed to lose the audience we had."

In 2007, Fanning noted that their song "Nobody Sees" was the bookend to "Pick You Up", with its first line "Who's gonna pick you up?", noting that he's no longer going to.

== Response ==
"Pick You Up"
A 24 second sample from Powderfinger's "Pick You Up".

"Pick You Up" was nominated for the 1996 ARIA Award for "Song of the Year". The song was also performed live by the band at the ceremony. Concrete Press journalist Matt Budden was filled with praise for the four tracks on "Pick You Up's" single. He said that "Pick You Up" had a "very professional sound", which he said was well complemented by Bernard Fanning's "grainy" voice. He also praised the rhythmic guitar set, saying that it "lingers like the smell at a cookie factory." Budden also lauded the b-sides, describing "Toffee Apple" as being reminiscent of Spinal Tap, calling the combination of "slow repetitive guitars" and "soft sweet lyrics" in "Wobbly Knee" beautiful, and dubbing "Come Away" bizarre in the most positive sense.

Angus Fountaine of The Sunday Telegraph also approved of Fanning's voice in "Pick You Up", stating that "His smooth vocal […] catapulted the band from rough 'n' ready indy hopefuls to slick Top 40 fortune seekers." When performed live, Alphonse Leong of Drop-D Magazine said that "Pick You Up", "which sounds kind of sappy on disc, packed more of a wallop live". He also described Powderfinger as "a band with a mastery of loud, driving music".

== Track listing ==
1. "Pick You Up" – 4:19
2. "Toffee Apple" – 2:24
3. "Wobbly Knee" – 3:56
4. "Come Away" – 3:55
5. "Piles" (Hidden Track)

== Charts ==
Chart (1996)	Peak position
Australia (ARIA)	23
