= Stumblin' =

Single by Powderfinger

from the album These Days: Live in Concert
- Released: 2004
- Genre: Rock
- Label: Universal
- Songwriters: Jon Coghill, John Collins, Bernard Fanning, Ian Haug, Darren Middleton
- Producer: Nick DiDia

Powderfinger singles chronology
"Since You've Been Gone" (2004)	"Stumblin'" (2004)	"Bless My Soul" (2004)

"Stumblin'" is a song by Australian rock group Powderfinger, which is a track on their fifth album, Vulture Street. A live version was issued in 2004 as a promotional single from the group's first live album, These Days: Live in Concert (6 September 2004), which had been recorded from a performance at the Sydney Entertainment Centre on 12 December 2003. The B-side is the studio version from Vulture Street. The track was listed on the Triple J Hottest 100, 2003 – an annual poll by listeners of the national radio station. The song was used in an ad for Australian road safety.

== Reception ==
Marsdenator from FasterLouder opined that it is "one of the strongest songs from [Vulture Street]. It’s a big call because there are many great tracks on that album, but it is this song that speaks to me the most... all the instruments are set to a relaxed and comfortable tempo that is in no way intrusive, including a solo with a similar sound to those of Led Zepplin [sic] and Eric Clapton." Olivier for Sleaze Roxx in his review of the studio album felt "Songs such as 'Rockin' Rocks', 'Stumblin'' and of course '(Baby I've Got You) On My Mind' have an infectious groove to them and are excellent straight-on rockers with an old school '70s feel... after the seventh song 'Stumblin'', you might as well just shut off the CD and call it a day." Bernard Zuel of The Sydney Morning Herald compared the track to "what the Stooges' Ron Ashton might have sounded like if he had played with the Rolling Stones."

== Track listing ==
"Stumblin'"
An 18 second sample from Powderfinger's "Stumblin'".

1. "Stumblin'" (Live from Sydney Entertainment Centre, 12 December 2003)
2. "Stumblin'" (Studio version)
