= Parables for Wooden Ears =

Studio album by Powderfinger
- Released: 18 July 1994 (Australia)
- Recorded: February 1994
- Studio: Metropolis (Melbourne)
- Genres: Grunge, alternative metal
- Length: 49:54
- Label: Polydor
- Producer: Tony Cohen

Powderfinger chronology
Transfusion (1993)	Parables for Wooden Ears (1994)	Mr Kneebone (1995)

Singles from Parables for Wooden Ears
- 1. "Tail" Released: 14 June 1994; 2. "Grave Concern" Released: 22 August 1994; 3. "Save Your Skin" Released: 22 July 1995

Parables for Wooden Ears is the debut studio album released by the Australian band Powderfinger. It was released on 18 July 1994 by Polydor Records, after recording at the Metropolis Studios in Melbourne during February 1994. The album peaked a number 51 on the ARIA charts, selling 10,000 copies.

The album was received poorly by critics who complained about its poor imitation of Americana, as well as its overuse of complex riffs. In a 2004 interview, Powderfinger lead singer Bernard Fanning said, in reference to the album, "God knows what we were on then."

Three singles were released from the album, all of which failed to chart.

== History ==
In a 1996 interview, Fanning described Parables for Wooden Ears as "big and presumptuous", and stated that it had "a pretty massive sort of sound". He said that the band somewhat regretted this, and did not intend to do so again on future releases.

On Parables for Wooden Ears, Powderfinger worked with the producer Tony Cohen, whom Fanning described as having a huge reputation, and thus being expensive to work with. However, because of the "lack of an obvious single", the album sold poorly, despite the effort put into production. Parables for Wooden Ears contained references by Powderfinger to Aboriginal rights, with a song written by the drummer Jon Coghill discussing the idea that the band's generation was the first to reach out to the concept of reconciliation.

In 1998, the guitarist Ian Haug described their third album Internationalist as a moderation between the band's last two albums, calling Parables for Wooden Ears a "complicated beast". In a 1999 interview, Fanning said that the band "were sorting out our sound" on the album, and that despite it not working well they still thought it was "a good record". Juice commentator Simon Wooldridge noted in 2000 that Parables for Wooden Ears contained "million"s of riffs, and thus the band were not able to produce a simple sound on the album.

In a November 2004 interview with the Melbourne newspaper, The Age, Fanning recalled that the head of Polydor Records had described the album as "awful" and remarked that "God knows what we were on then". He also said that in making Parables for Wooden Ears, Powderfinger "went through this weird stage of trying to be something [they] weren't." Fanning also told Australian Musician that the album, a "spectacular failure", was a result of the band feeling "forced" to play like other bands that were popular in Brisbane at the time.

== Release and response ==
Parables for Wooden Ears was released on 18 July 1994 on the Polydor Records label. Three singles were released from Parables for Wooden Ears: "Tail", released on 14 June 1994, "Grave Concern", released on 22 August 1994, and "Save Your Skin", released on 22 July 1995. Due to the minimal promotion and reputation of the band, the singles failed to reach the ARIA top 100, with "Tail" performing the best, peaking at 118.

Critics generally agreed with Powderfinger's assessment of the album, with some describing it as "a thundering rock album" and noting the similarity to Americana. Fanning also noted that the album had a lot less "balance" than the album that followed it, Double Allergic. Other critics noted that Parables for Wooden Ears had a "dark, overly complex metal sound" and complained of the album's "distorted guitars", but put this down to the album being a learning experience for the band.

"Tail"
25 second sample from "Tail"

Parables for Wooden Ears received a moderate response from reviewers. Juice reviewer John Encarnacao enjoyed the rock elements of the album, drawing comparisons to Pearl Jam, Soundgarden and Alice In Chains. He thanked producer Tony Cohen for the "big sound" of the album, and said that the musicians on the album "not only know about power and restraint, but also play tastefully". Encarnacao stated that Fanning "lays the emotion on thick and usually more than gets away with it." The review was summarised by stating that the album may have been "a bit like the retro-rock that the big corporations want you to buy", but that nonetheless it was a good album.

Jackson G. Marx was similarly conflicted in Australian Rolling Stone, writing, "They create painstaking technical 'works' of art. This is not necessarily a compliment. Sometimes it's a certified jerk-off." Despite describing some songs as, "tragically clever," and, "grooveless monstrosities," he scored the album three stars from five, and wrote of the pleasure of repeated listens. "'Tail', for example, is tangled and inert and teeters precariously on the brink of disappearing up its own arsehole, but a determined listener will find its hooks more infecting with each spin."

Sputnikmusic contributor James Bishop gave the album a score of 2.5 (average), summarising his review with the statement "Get Double Allergic instead." Bishop stated that the album contained too much imitation, and that the album is "pretty much forgotten by even the most hardcoriest of music fans" because of the poor imitation in it - described as "a simple case of "monkey see, monkey not do very well"." Bishop praised some aspects of the album, stating that "Hurried Bloom" contained "a raw song-writing ability" and that "Sink Low" was "a hidden gem". However, he said that the majority of songs contained Powderfinger trying too hard with their riffs, noting "Bridle You" and "Father's Pyramid" as specific examples. Bishop also criticised the lyrics in most songs, stating that "Walking Stick" contained "some horrendously bad lyrics". The highlight of the album for Bishop was "Save Your Skin", which he called "a gorgeous addition to their collection", despite calling the overall album "a pretty dark and depressing experience".

== Track listing ==
All music written by Bernard Fanning, John Collins, Ian Haug, Darren Middleton, Jon Coghill. Lyrics by Fanning unless otherwise noted.

1. "Walking Stick" – 4:06
2. "Tail" – 5:27
3. "Hurried Bloom" – 3:34
4. "Fathers' Pyramid" – 4:38 (Fanning, Coghill)
5. "Bridle You" – 3:56
6. "Citadel" – 3:23
7. "Sink Low" – 2:12
8. "Grave Concern" – 4:46
9. "Solution" – 3:50
10. "This Syrup to Exchange" – 4:31 (Fanning, Coghill)
11. "Namaste" – 2:21
12. "Blanket" – 3:39
13. "Save Your Skin" – 3:36

== Personnel ==
- Bernard Fanning — vocals, organ, piano, acoustic guitar
- Ian Haug — acoustic and electric guitars
- Darren Middleton — acoustic and electric guitars
- John Collins — bass
- Jon Coghill — drums; temple drum on "Hurried Bloom"

Additional personnel

- Bernard Quinn — backing vocals
- Matt Porter Habben — clarinet
- James Beck — cello
- Geoff Hales — percussion on all tracks except for "Hurried Bloom"

== Charts ==
Chart (1994)	Peak position
Australian Albums (ARIA)	51

Chart (2024)	Peak position
Australian Albums (ARIA)	36
