= Already Gone (Powderfinger song) =

Single by Powderfinger

from the album Internationalist
- Released: 12 February 1999 (Australia)
- Recorded: Sing Sing Studios, Melbourne
- Genre: Rock
- Label: Universal
- Songwriter(s): Jon Coghill, John Collins, Bernard Fanning, Ian Haug, Darren Middleton

Powderfinger singles chronology
"Don't Wanna Be Left Out/Good-Day Ray" (1998)	"Already Gone" (1999)	"Passenger" (1999)

"Already Gone" is a song from Powderfinger's third studio album Internationalist. It was released as a single on 12 February 1999.

Australian Idol's first season runner-up Shannon Noll performed "Already Gone" in the 22 September episode of Australian Idol 2003 as his contribution to the Australian Hits category.

== Music video ==
The music video for "Already Gone" was a change in direction for Powderfinger, and one that caused a certain degree of backlash from their fans. Fanning himself has publicly disowned the music clip, meanwhile still embracing the song attached to it. Fanning put this down to "being lazy" and has commented that he never meant to misinterpret women in such a way. The music video has some women scantily clad playing Totem tennis in a suggestible manner.

== Track listing ==
"Already Gone"
A 19 second sample from Powderfinger's "Already Gone".

1. "Already Gone"
2. "Control Freak"
3. "Today You Come"
4. "The Day You Come (Remix)"
5. "Tom (Demo)"

== Charts ==
Chart (1999)	Peak position
Australia (ARIA)	68
