= (Baby I've Got You) On My Mind =

2003 single by Powderfinger

Single by Powderfinger

from the album Vulture Street
- Released: 16 June 2003
- Studio: Sing Sing (Melbourne)
- Genre: Hard rock
- Length: 3:23
- Label: Universal Music Australia
- Songwriters: Steven Bishop; John Collins; Ian Haug; Bernard Fanning; Jon Coghill; Darren Middleton
- Producer: Nick DiDia

Powderfinger singles chronology
"The Metre/Waiting for the Sun" (2001)	"(Baby I've Got You) On My Mind" (2003)	"Love Your Way" (2003)

"(Baby I've Got You) On My Mind" (also known simply as "On My Mind") is the first single from the fifth studio album by Powderfinger. It was released as a single on 16 June 2003 and reached No. 9 on the Australian Singles Chart, the band's third-highest-charting single to date. In January 2018, as part of Triple M's "Ozzest 100", the 'most Australian' songs of all time, "(Baby I've Got You) On My Mind" was ranked No. 97, and placed 70 on the Triple J Hottest 100 of Australian Songs in 2025. The music video, directed by Scott Walton, was nominated for Best Video at the ARIA Music Awards of 2003.

== Background ==
"(Baby I've Got You) On My Mind"
25 second sample from "(Baby I've Got You) On My Mind"

After two albums of either acoustic anthems (such as "My Happiness") or ballads ("The Metre" or "The Day You Come"), Powderfinger decided to release a heavy rock song as their new album, Vulture Street's lead single. In accordance with this, the band's publicity was geared towards a more rock oriented slant, with magazine covers and articles indicating that they were "returning to rock", alluding to the rock albums Parables for Wooden Ears and the highly successful Double Allergic, however some criticism was that the band's "rock" sound was different from previous releases, indicating that they were trying to be more like AC/DC than previously. Although the single for the song was released under the title of "On My Mind", the album cover has the song's title printed as "(Baby I've Got You) On My Mind". It is alleged that Bernard Fanning implicitly wrote the lyrics as a tribute to former radio and television personality John Burgess. The band stated that the intro of the song is a "production tribute" to the repeating guitar riff in David Bowie's "Suffragette City" (1972).

The album's artwork is of a painted ship entitled "On My Mind". The design style of the cover and case is in the same style as the other singles from Vulture Street, however all are very different from the album itself, except for the use of highly contrasting colours.

== Music video ==
The music video for "On My Mind" was directed by Scott Walton. The video, like the group's previous single "Like a Dog", was filmed in black and white. The clip was nominated for Best Video at the ARIA Music Awards of 2003.

== Track listings ==
CD version

1. "On My Mind" – 3:24
2. "Sweetness" ("Bandroom" demo version) – 2:25
3. "On My Mind" ("Bandroom" demo version) – 3:51
4. "This Song Has Gone to Hell" (studio outtake) – 3:36

7-inch version

1. "On My Mind" (album version) – 3:23
2. "On My Mind" (instrumental) – 3:23
3. "On My Mind" (acapella) – 3:23

== Charts ==
Chart (2003)	Peak position
Australia (ARIA)	9
UK Rock & Metal (Official Charts)	34

== Certifications ==
Certifications for "(Baby I've Got You) On My Mind"
Region	Certification	Certified units/sales
New Zealand (RMNZ)	Gold	15,000^{‡}
^{‡} Sales+streaming figures based on certification alone.

== Release history ==
Region	Date	Format(s)	Label(s)	Ref.
Australia	16 June 2003	CD	Universal Music Australia	
United Kingdom	10 November 2003	CD	V2	
United States	7 February 2005	Mainstream rock; active rock; alternative radio	Artemis	

== Cover versions ==
In 2005, on the third season of Australian Idol, the song was performed by contestant Tarni Stephans on the Top 12 Australiana theme night. Stephans was eliminated the next night on the verdict show, however she recorded a cover of this song on that season's cast album.

In 2007, "(Baby I've Got You) On My Mind" was performed again on the fifth season of Australian Idol by Natalie Gauci who eventually won the series. Gauci recorded a cover of the song for her Winner's Journey album.

In 2021, dance duo Mashd N Kutcher released a record sampling the vocals of the song, under the title "On My Mind".
