= Since You've Been Gone (Powderfinger song) =

Single by Powderfinger

from the album Vulture Street
- Released: 2004
- Recorded: Sing Sing Studios, Melbourne
- Genre: Rock, Soul
- Label: Universal; Grudge
- Songwriters: Jon Coghill, John Collins, Bernard Fanning, Ian Haug, Darren Middleton
- Producer: Nick DiDia

Powderfinger singles chronology
| "Sunsets" (2004) | "Since You've Been Gone" (2004) | "Stumblin'" (2004) |

"Since You've Been Gone" is a 2004 single from Powderfinger's fifth studio album Vulture Street. It was the fourth and final single released from Vulture Street and reached #51 on the Australian music chart. It was a limited-edition single, hence no video or puzzle piece on the spine of the single. The song refers to Powderfinger's lead singer Bernard Fanning missing his brother who had died a year prior to the song's release.

== Track listing ==
"Since You've Been Gone"
A 19 second sample from Powderfinger's "Since You've Been Gone".

1. "Since You've Been Gone"
2. "Stop Sign" (Airlock demo)
3. "Another Day"

== Charts ==
| Chart (2004) | Peak position |
|---|---|
| Australia (ARIA) | 51 |
