= Love Your Way =

Single by Powderfinger

from the album Vulture Street
- Released: September 2003
- Recorded: Sing Sing Studios, Melbourne
- Genre: Rock
- Length: 4:22
- Label: Universal; Grudge
- Songwriters: Jon Coghill, John Collins, Bernard Fanning, Ian Haug, Darren Middleton

Powderfinger singles chronology
"(Baby I've Got You) On My Mind" (2003)	"Love Your Way" (2003)	"Sunsets" (2004)

"Love Your Way" is a song from Powderfinger's fifth studio album Vulture Street. It was the second single from Vulture Street and reached No. 37 on the Australian music chart having charted in September 2003 It was physically released as a single on 25 May 2004.

The single's artwork is a high contrast colour painting of the Australian Outback with a photograph of a girl in a bikini walking a dog pasted onto it. The girl is desaturated and the ground is colourised to bright fuchsia.

== Audio sample ==
This audio sample indicates the chorus and part of a verse of the song.

Powderfinger "Love Your Way"
20 second sample from Powderfinger's "Love Your Way"

== Music video ==
The music video for "Love Your Way" was directed by Scott Walton of Fifty Fifty Films, and features Bernard Fanning and Darren Middleton in a fencing match. At the end of the second chorus, the other band members appear in fencing uniforms and are defeated by Fanning. At the end of the song, Fanning throws his fencing mask down at Middleton, concluding the match.

== Track listing ==
=== Australian Version ===
1. "Love Your Way" – 4:22
2. "Rocket Reducer No. 62 (Rama Lama Fa Fa Fa)" – 4:25
3. "Hard Luck Dave" – 3:17
4. "City Hum" ("Love Your Way" Demo) – 4:19

=== UK Version ===
Enhanced content CD

1. "Love Your Way"
2. "Morning Sun"
3. "Number of the Beast"
- Enhanced content:
  - "Love Your Way" (video)
  - Photo gallery

== Charts ==
Chart (2003)	Peak position
Australia (ARIA)	37
