= Joel Turner discography =

- Studio albums: 2
- Singles: 9
- Video albums: 1
- Music videos: 6

The discography of Joel Turner, an Australian hip hop singer, songwriter, beatboxer, record producer, and musician, consists of two studio albums, one video album, nine singles, and six music videos.

Turner came to prominence after auditioning in the first season of Australian Idol in 2003. His debut album, Joel Turner and the Modern Day Poets, was released as a collaboration in 2004 with hip-hop group, the Modern Day Poets. The album peaked at number 28 on the Australian Top 100 Albums Chart and received platinum certification by the Australian Recording Industry Association. The lead single "These Kids" reached number one on the Australian Top 100 Singles Chart and received platinum certification. The album's subsequent singles "Knock U Out", "Funk U Up" and "Respect" peaked at numbers 14, 13 and 29, respectively. Turner released a video album, Joel Turner and the Modern Day Poets with the Beatbox Alliance in 2005 on Dream Dealers.

He released a non-album single "All Night Long" in 2007, which debuted at number 38. Later that year, Turner released his second studio album, Out of the Box on Hardwax. The album failed to achieve the commercial success of his debut album, failing to rank on the national chart. The lead single "City of Dreams" reached number 30. As of January 2010, Turner was working on his third studio album and second video album.

== Studio albums ==
List of studio albums, with selected chart positions and certifications
Title	Album details	Peak chart positions	Certifications
Title	Album details	AUS	Certifications
Joel Turner and the Modern Day Poets (Note: Released by Joel Turner and the Modern Day Poets.)	Released: 1 November 2004; Label: Dream Dealers (#7002); Format: CD, digital download	28	ARIA: Platinum
Out of the Box	Released: 6 October 2007; Label: Hardwax (#0041); Format: CD, digital download	—	

== Singles ==
List of singles, with selected chart positions and certifications
Year	Title	Peak chart positions	Certifications	Album
Year	Title	AUS	Certifications	Album
2004	"These Kids"	1	ARIA: Platinum	Joel Turner and the Modern Day Poets
2005	"Knock U Out" (featuring Anthony Mundine)	14		Joel Turner and the Modern Day Poets
2005	"Funk U Up"	13		Joel Turner and the Modern Day Poets
2005	"Respect"	29		Joel Turner and the Modern Day Poets
2007	"All Night Long" (featuring Israel, Stan Bravo and C4)	38		Single-only release
2007	"City of Dreams" (featuring C4 and KNO)	30		Out of the Box
2017	"The Wall" (with Aislinn Sharp)			non album singles
2022	"Mullet" (featuring Macca the Rappa)			non album singles
2024	"These Kids" (20th Anniversary Remix)			non album singles

== Video albums ==
Year	Title
2005	Joel Turner and the Modern Day Poets with the Beatbox Alliance: Label: Dream Dealers (#7006); Format: DVD

== Music videos ==
Year	Title	Director
2004	"These Kids"	Amiel Courtin-Wilson
2005	"Knock U Out"	Amiel Courtin-Wilson
2005	"Funk U Up"	Amiel Courtin-Wilson
2005	"Respect"	Amiel Courtin-Wilson
2007	"All Night Long"	—N/a
2007	"City of Dreams"	Benjamin Samuel Broso
