= Mundine =

Mundine may refer to any of the following people

- Anthony Mundine (born 1975), Australian Professional boxer and Rugby League player
- Beau Mundine (born 1980), Australian minor-league rugby league footballer
- Lynette Riley-Mundine (born 1956), Australian academic and artist, wife of Warren
- Tony Mundine (born 1951), Australian boxer
- Warren Mundine (born 1956), Australian Aboriginal leader
