= Joel Turner and the Modern Day Poets with the Beatbox Alliance =

Video by Joel Turner and the Modern Day Poets
- Released: October 17, 2005
- Genre: Hip-hop
- Label: Dream Dealers (#7006)
- Director: Amiel Courtin-Wilson
- Producer: Amiel Courtin-Wilson

Joel Turner and the Modern Day Poets with the Beatbox Alliance is a DVD released by Australian hip hop musician Joel Turner. It was Turner's first DVD release and contains live performances. The packaging also holds a copy of Turner's debut album Joel Turner and the Modern Day Poets.

The main feature of the DVD is a 50-minute documentary chronicling the national tour undertaken by Turner, the Modern Day Poets (MDP) and the Beatbox Alliance in early 2005. Scenes focus particularly on performances at the Melbourne International Music Festival, Newcastle University, the Byron Bay East Coast Blues and Roots Festival, and the West Coast Blues and Roots Festival, as well as the band’s attendance of the 2005 MTV Australia Video Music Awards in Sydney. Concert highlights are interspersed with behind-the-scenes footage filmed on the road and at various hotels, along with snippets from interviews with Turner, his then-manager Mark Holden, and members of MDP and the Beatbox Alliance. Some of the content from the documentary reappears in the music video for Turner’s third single “Funk U Up”, which was released in May 2005.

Additional items on the DVD include music videos for the four singles lifted from Turner’s debut album, and live versions of several songs and beatboxing solos filmed at the 2005 West Coast Blues and Roots Festival in Fremantle. The DVD is supplemented with bonus features such as artist profiles, a photo gallery, and commentary on the making of the first three music videos by director Amiel Courtin-Wilson. Also included is a “Secret Section” and “Beatbox Challenge”, in which the viewer must guess a password and successfully complete an observation test in order to gain access to hidden footage.

== Play list ==
- Joel Turner and the Modern Day Poets with the Beatbox Alliance Tour 2005 Documentary
- "These Kids" Music Video
- "Knock U Out" Music Video
- "Funk U Up" Music Video
- "Respect" Music Video
- "Funk U Up" Live
- "Up In The Studio" Live
- "Respect" Live
- Hopey 1 Solo
- K1 Solo
- Tank Solo
- Joel T. Solo

== Bonus features ==
- Secret Section
- Profiles
- Director’s Commentary
- Gallery
- Beatbox Challenge
