= George Newhouse =

Australian human rights lawyer and councillor

George Newhouse AM

Mayor of Waverley
- In office 21 September 2006 – 20 September 2007
- Deputy: George Copeland
- Preceded by: Mora Main
- Succeeded by: Ingrid Strewe

Deputy Mayor of Waverley
- In office 8 April 2004 – 21 September 2006
- Mayor: Peter Moscatt; Mora Main
- Preceded by: Mora Main
- Succeeded by: George Copeland

Councillor of Waverley Council for Hunter Ward
- In office September 1995 – 13 September 2008

Personal details
- Born: Brisbane, Queensland, Australia
- Party: Australian Labor Party (NSW Branch)
- Occupation: Human rights and social justice lawyer

George Newhouse AM is an Australian human rights lawyer and a former local councillor. He is the principal solicitor of the National Justice Project, a human rights and social justice legal service, and currently an Adjunct Professor of Law at Macquarie University and at the University of Technology Sydney.

He was the Mayor of Waverley in the eastern suburbs of Sydney from 2006 to 2007, and the Labor candidate for the seat of Wentworth at the 2007 Australian federal election.

== Professional career ==
Newhouse attended Sydney Grammar School and then studied Law and Commerce at the University of New South Wales.

After leaving university, Newhouse joined JPMorgan in Sydney as a corporate finance executive and was later transferred to JPMorgan's New York office. From New York, he moved to London where he worked for two years as a capital markets lawyer for Clifford Chance. In 1990, he returned to Sydney and continued working as a lawyer with Swaab & Associates. He became an accredited mediator and was a member of the Consumer Trader Tenancy Tribunal from 1999 to 2007 and a mediator for the Workers Compensation Commission from 2001 to 2010.

In addition to his expertise in social justice law, Newhouse specialises in defamation, privacy, negligence, property, finance and planning law. He is an adjunct professor at Macquarie University where he teaches law, he is also an adjunct professor at the University of Technology Sydney at the Jumbunna Inst for Indigenous Education & Research and is also the chapter editor of Thomson Reuters The Laws of Australia: Aboriginal and Torres Strait Islanders – Civil Justice Issues.

Newhouse co-founded the National Justice Project in 2016 with Dan Mori and Duncan Fine. As the principal solicitor of the Project his work involves using the law in ways that support and advance social justice and human rights in Australia. It does this by supporting those who are least able to access justice and whose cases can advance human rights within Australia and the Pacific region. In addition the National Justice Project has taken on a number of research, education, advocacy and reform projects such as the Aboriginal Health Project.

In August 2008 Newhouse was invited to participate in the prime minister, Kevin Rudd's Australia 2020 summit in the area of indigenous affairs.

== Human rights representation ==
Newhouse is well known in Australia for his human rights work with refugees, former Immigration detainees and Aboriginal Australians. His extensive social justice work was acknowledged in 2017 when he was awarded the Ron Castan Humanitarian award and again in 2019 when he received the Australian Lawyers Alliance Civil Justice Award

=== Refugees ===
Newhouse represented Vivian Solon, who was deported from Australia to the Philippines; Cornelia Rau, who was detained in an Australian detention centre for ten months; the Sudanese Dafurian community, and the family of the late Richard Niyonsaba. Newhouse has also acted for Tamil, Chinese, Palestinian and Iranian asylum seekers following the Rau and Solon cases.

In February 2011, Newhouse was successful in securing the release of Seena Akhlaqi Sheikhdost, an orphan whose parents had died in a shipwreck on Christmas Island from immigration detention. He also facilitated a family with two vulnerable children to be moved from Inverbrackie Detention Centre in Adelaide to community detention in Sydney. Newhouse has championed the use of the Commonwealth's common law duty of care to have children released from fenced detention.

In 2011 in the WA Coroner's Court, Newhouse represented the survivors and relatives of those who died in the 2010 Christmas Island boat disaster; and he represented the next of kin of one of the three suicides in Villawood before the NSW Coroner. He also obtained an injunction to stop the first Afghan asylum seeker to be forcibly returned to Afghanistan. In 2013 he acted for two vulnerable youths in immigration detention and had them released into the community. In 2013 and 2014 together with Julian Burnside and Dan Mori he mounted a Constitutional Challenge to the detention of asylum seekers on Nauru. Newhouse fought for the rights of those indefinitely detained in immigration detention to be released or to have their adverse ASIO determinations reviewed.

Newhouse led a team of lawyers to challenge the Minister of Immigration's decision to refuse to bring a woman who had become pregnant as a result of a rape on Nauru to Australia for a safe and lawful termination. His success in the Plaintiff s99 Case affirmed that the Minister for Immigration had a duty of care to asylum seekers offshore as well as in Australia.

As a result of that action Newhouse was able to bring other women to Australia throughout 2017.

In February 2017, the National Justice Project, under the direction of Newhouse, was successful, in obtaining an injunction to stop the Minister for Immigration from implementing a blanket policy to remove the mobile phones of all detainees in Immigration Detention.

In December 2017, Newhouse and the National Justice Project team commenced legal proceedings for a 12-year-old girl (known by the pseudonym FRX17) on Nauru who required urgent medical treatment which was not available on Nauru that case was successful and they followed up that case with legal action for 46 other refugee children on Nauru. Those cases and the Nauru Government's decision to deport Medecins Sans Frontieres medical staff led to the #kidsoffnauru campaign and ultimately to legislation, known as the "Medevac bill" to ensure the medical evacuation of refugees in need of care. His work in this area has been documented in an academic article published in the Court of Conscience.

=== First Nations Peoples ===
In 2006, Newhouse worked with the Mutitjulu Aboriginal Community to overturn the decision of the Howard Government to impose an Administrator over the Mutitjulu Community Aboriginal Corporation on the basis that the decision was ultra vires, or beyond the power of the decision maker. In January 2009 Newhouse advised Barbara Shaw and the Prescribed Areas Peoples Alliance on their complaint about the Commonwealth Government's Northern Territory Intervention Laws to the United Nations Committee for the Elimination of Racial Discrimination.

In August 2009, Newhouse, on behalf of Barbara Shaw and other town camp residents, gathered a team of lawyers led by Ron Merkel QC to stop the Minister for Aboriginal Affairs, Jenny Macklin from proceeding with her takeover of the Alice Springs Town Camps and entering into a 40-year lease with the town camp associations.

In January 2010, he took on "cyber racists" who published material vilifying Indigenous Australians and succeeded in having Google remove search results and links to two racially offensive web pages based outside of Australia. During 2010 Newhouse worked with the Aboriginal Communities in the Northern Territory to fight for a fair rent to be paid by the Commonwealth Government for leases which the Commonwealth had taken over Aboriginal land which were compulsorily acquired under the Northern Territory Intervention legislation. In May 2010 Newhouse assisted traditional owners of Muckaty Station (Warlmanpa) to commence legal action against the Northern Land Council and the Commonwealth to overturn the nomination of their land as the site of Australia's first radioactive waste storage facility.

In January 2011, Newhouse successfully represented the Hermannsburg Bulldogs, an Indigenous Australian rules football team from Hermannsburg, in the Northern Territory and had them reinstated into the Central Australian Football League competition after they were suspended from the competition without due process. In 2013 and 2014 Newhouse acted for several Aboriginal Australian women who had their children removed by child protection agencies.

In 2014, Newhouse acted for the family of Andrea Pickett, an Aboriginal woman who was brutally murdered by her husband. The family took action against the Western Australian Police and the WA Department of Child Protection.

Newhouse has acted in many inquests for Aboriginal Australians who died in custody. In 2015-6 he acted for the Deaths in Custody Watch Committee of WA in the inquest into the death of Ms Dhu in police custody. He also acts for the family of David Dungay Jr who died in Long Bay Correctional Centre in December 2015. As of 2017 he was assisting the family of the late Wayne Fella Morrison, who died in Yatala Prison in September 2016.

Newhouse has acted for Aboriginal Communities in WA and the Northern Territory, participated in many rallies and spoken at different events defending the rights of Indigenous Australians, refugees, ethnic minority groups and genocide survivors and denouncing all forms of racism and anti-Semitism and human rights abuse.

=== Other matters ===
Newhouse has represented gay activist Gary Burns in two of his homosexual vilification cases. Newhouse had an assault charge dismissed against a 64-year-old grandmother, Leentije (Eva) McDonald, who was searched by NSW Police outside a pub in Maroubra in unusual circumstances. Newhouse acted for the Emden Family in their efforts to have their claim, that the painting 'Lady with a fan', by Gerard ter Borch was stolen from their grandfather Max Emden by German army officials during World War II, recognised by the National Gallery of Victoria. In 2015 Newhouse won a defamation case against Newscorp blogger Andrew Bolt, who had alleged that Newhouse had fraudulently asserted that a number of Sri Lankan people attempting to reach Australia by boat were asylum seekers. Newscorp were ordered to remove the offending articles.

== Political career ==
=== Local government ===
Newhouse served as a Labor councillor on Waverley Council from 1995 to 2008 (representing Hunter Ward, which covers North Bondi, Rose Bay, Dover Heights and parts of Vaucluse). He was active in the various local government committees, participating in the Finance, Ethics and Community Services Committees and chairing the Development Control Committee. He was a founding member of the Waverley-Woollahra Bondi Junction Joint Planning Committee, and chaired the Waverley Council Bondi Junction Committee during a period of major upgrade including the $600 million Westfield redevelopment and the upgrade of Oxford Street. Newhouse was elected to the executive of the NSW Local Government Association in 2004. Newhouse was elected Deputy Mayor of Waverley in 2004 and became Mayor in September 2006. As Mayor, he undertook "back-to-basics" reforms by upgrading Bondi Park, Campbell Parade and Hall Street, moving Waverley Council's Service Centre and Planning Counter to Bondi Junction, creating a "mobile Mayoral unit" to keep in touch with local residents, and emphasising the need to combat climate change at a local level, by committing Waverley Council to be carbon-neutral within five years and supporting other environmentally-friendly initiatives. Newhouse did not recontest the 2008 local government election.

=== Federal politics ===
Newhouse was endorsed in May 2007 as the Labor candidate for the federal electorate of Wentworth, held by the Liberal member, Malcolm Turnbull; at the time the Minister for Environment in the Howard Government. In order to contest the election, Newhouse resigned as Mayor of Waverley. Although Wentworth had never been won by Labor, there was speculation that after a redistribution it might be winnable. Newhouse backed Labor's support of the construction of the Bell Bay Pulp Mill in the Tamar Valley, Tasmania. Newhouse's decision led to criticism from the Australian Greens and other environmentalists. Two candidates, former Sydney Deputy Mayor Dixie Coulton and Danielle Ecuyer, nominated against Newhouse as anti-pulp mill candidates.

A few days before the election, Turnbull made claims that Newhouse's nomination as a candidate was invalid because Newhouse did not resign from his positions on the Consumer, Trader and Tenancy Tribunal and the Workers Compensation Commission before nominating. Newhouse and the Labor Party denied that he had not resigned before nominating and dismissed the allegations by pointing to section 1 (e) of Schedule 2 of the Consumer Trader and Tenancy Tribunal Act which automatically vacated his office as a member of the Tribunal when Newhouse nominated for election as a member of a House of Parliament of the Commonwealth. In the days before the election the Liberal Party increased its attacks on Newhouse by revealing that a Newhouse campaign worker, former National Union of Students President Rose Jackson, had allegedly espoused "anti-Zionist views" in an email during her tenure with the NUS. Jackson said she had "not understood the proper definition of Zionism" at the time she wrote the email and that she supported the right of Israel to exist as a Jewish homeland.

On polling day Newhouse was assaulted by a prominent journalist Caroline Overington at their local polling booth. The editor-in-chief of The Australian, Chris Mitchell, mediated the dispute between the two and The Australian published an apology to Newhouse on 4 December 2007.

Newhouse increased Labor's primary vote at the 2007 election, taking Labor to within 3.85% of victory but was unsuccessful.

== Other community involvement ==
In 2004 Newhouse was appointed to the NSW Architects Registration Board to represent the views of local government; and he is a former board member of the Australian Women Chamber of Commerce & Industry. In 2008 Newhouse and Warren Mundine established the Australian Indigenous Chamber of Commerce to promote indigenous entrepreneurship. Newhouse was a director of the chamber to 2012. Newhouse is also a member of the Board of the Stolen Generations Testimony Foundation and was a Member of the advisory board of the Alex Buzo Company between 2007 and 2010. George also became a committee member of the Australian Climate Justice Program in November 2017. In August 2009 Newhouse assisted with the establishment of the Adrian Lam Foundation for youth in PNG through education and sport. Newhouse has been the company secretary for The McKell Institute, a progressive public policy institute dedicated to developing practical policy ideas and contributing to public debate, since its inception in 2011. In 2017 Newhouse became a committee member of the Climate Justice Programme.

In the 1980s, George Newhouse co-led an activist group called Jews Against The Apathetic Community (JATAC).

Civic offices
Preceded by Mora Main	Deputy Mayor of Waverley; 2004–2006	Succeeded by George Copeland
Preceded by Mora Main	Mayor of Waverley; 2006–2007	Succeeded by Ingrid Strewe
