= AWCC (disambiguation) =

AWCC may refer to:

- AWCC, or Afghan Wireless Communication Company
- Alaska Wildlife Conservation Center, in the US
- AWCC, or Allied Wireless Communications Corporation
- AWCC, the Albury Wodonga Cycling Club, organiser of the John Woodman Memorial bicycle handicap race in New South Wales
- Association of Waterways Cruising Clubs
- AWCC, or Africa West Coast Cable, former name of the West Africa Cable System

== See also ==
- AWCCI, Australian Women Chamber of Commerce & Industry
