= Rahim Mundine =

Australian boxer (born 2001)

Personal information
- Nicknames: CJ (Choc Jr), The Dream
- Nationality: Australian
- Born: 12 July 2001 (age 25) Sydney, New South Wales, Australia
- Height: 1.78 m (5 ft 10 in)
- Weight: Super-welterweight

Boxing career

Boxing record
- Total fights: 3
- Wins: 3
- Win by KO: 1
- Losses: 0

Rahim 'CJ' Mundine (born 12 July 2001) is an Australian professional boxer.

== Early life ==
Mundine was born in Sydney, New South Wales to a father of Indigenous Australian descent (Bundjalung) and a mother of African-American descent. His father, Anthony, is a former IBO middleweight and WBA super-middleweight world champion and his grandfather, Tony, fought Carlos Monzón for the WBA middleweight world title in 1974, making Rahim a third-generation professional boxer.

His father also played rugby league professionally and became a premiership player with the Brisbane Broncos in 1997 as well as a New South Wales State of Origin representative in 1999. In his younger years, Rahim was an aspiring rugby league junior who played in the NSW Cup for South Sydney and the Wests Tigers before switching his focus to boxing full-time.

== Boxing career ==
With no amateur experience, Mundine began his professional boxing career in 2022 at the age of 20 when he defeated Fijian Lepani Levatia by unanimous decision at the Aware Super Theatre in Sydney. After several years away from the ring, Mundine returned for his second professional bout in July 2025 at the age of 24. He was victorious via a second-round TKO against Joe Vatusaqata in Sydney's Qudos Bank Arena. Following the win, Mundine vowed to defeat Danny Green's son Archie in the future and put his family's name ahead in the Mundine v Green rivalry that was popularised by their fathers in the 2000s and sits at one win each. Mundine's third fight marked the first time he had been televised during his career and he defeated Lance McDonald by unanimous decision while being heavily booed by the crowd in Newcastle following the announcement of the winner.

== Professional boxing record ==
| 3 fights | 3 wins | 0 losses |
|---|---|---|
| By knockout | 1 | 0 |
| By decision | 2 | 0 |

| No. | Result | Record | Opponent | Type | Round, time | Date | Location | Notes |
|---|---|---|---|---|---|---|---|---|
| 3 | Win | 3–0 | (Australia) Lance McDonald | UD | 5 | 6 May 2026 | Entertainment Centre, Newcastle, Australia | |
| 2 | Win | 2–0 | (Fiji) Joe Vatusaqata | TKO | 2 (4) 1:51 | 16 July 2025 | Qudos Bank Arena, Sydney, Australia | |
| 1 | Win | 1–0 | (Fiji) Lepani Levatia | UD | 4 | 23 March 2022 | Aware Super Theatre, Sydney, Australia | Professional debut |
