= Boxa =

Australian sports equipment manufacturer

- Company type: Private
- Industry: Sports equipment
- Founded: 2001; 24 years ago
- Founder: Anthony Mundine
- Headquarters: Sydney, Australia
- Area served: Worldwide
- Products: Boxing gloves and helmets
- Owner: Anthony Mundine
- Website: boxa.com.au

Boxa is an Australian boxing, mixed martial arts and clothing brand that was founded in Sydney, Australia in 2001. World boxing champion and former professional rugby league footballer Anthony Mundine started the brand as a boxing gloves and helmets company, but it eventually branched out into clothing as well and a Boxa Bar cafe in Hurstville.

The Boxa Bar was destroyed by fire in November 2013. At the time the fire was being investigated by police and being treated as suspicious, the Boxa Bar was no longer owned by Mundine then.

== Sponsorships ==
In addition to Mundine advertising his own company's sportswear, several celebrity athlete friends of Mundine also endorse Boxa products.

=== Athletes ===
- (Australia) Blake Ferguson
- (New Zealand) Sonny Bill Williams
- (New Zealand) Quade Cooper

=== National teams ===
- (Australia) Alexandria Rovers

== See also ==
- List of fitness wear brands
- List of sporting goods manufacturers
