= Beau Mundine =

Australian rugby league footballer

Personal information
- Born: 28 December 1980 (age 45) Sydney, New South Wales, Australia

Playing information
- Height: 188 cm (6 ft 2 in)
- Weight: 95 kg (14 st 13 lb)
- Position: Centre
Club
Years	Team	Pld	T	G	FG	P
2002–04	South Sydney	2	0	0	0	0
- Relatives: Tony Mundine (uncle); Anthony Mundine (cousin); Wes Patten (cousin)

Beau Mundine is an Australian professional rugby league footballer. He played for the South Sydney Rabbitohs in the National Rugby League competition. His position of choice was in the centres.

== Playing career ==
Mundine is the younger cousin of the rugby league footballer turned boxer Anthony Mundine and nephew of the boxer Tony Mundine. A St. George junior, he made his NRL debut for the South Sydney Rabbitohs as a 21-year-old in 2002 against the Wests Tigers at Leichhardt Oval. In 2004 he signed for the Canberra Raiders and continued his NRL career with them although he never made a first grade appearance for the club.

In 2006, he was playing for the St. George Illawarra Dragons which was his last year in the NRL. He made no first grade appearances for St. George Illawarra.

== Career highlights ==
- Junior Club: Moore Park Magpies
- First Grade Record: two appearances
