= Australian Indigenous Chamber of Commerce =

Former Australian chamber of commerce

The Australian Indigenous Chamber of Commerce (Indigenous Chamber) was a not-for-profit organisation established to promote and serve the interests of Indigenous Australian business. It adopted the subtitle Yaabubiin Institute for Disruptive Thinking for some of its existence, but it had ceased to exist by late 2020.

== History ==
The Indigenous Chamber was founded in 2008 by Warren Mundine, Shane Phillips and George Newhouse.

It adopted the additional name Yaabubiin Institute for Disruptive Thinking as a subtitle in 2016. Its website appeared to have wound down toward the end of October 2020.

== Description ==
The Indigenous Chamber was a not-for-profit organisation that aimed "to promote and serve the interests of Indigenous business, supporting and facilitating Indigenous self-reliance and economic prosperity".

The Indigenous Chamber hosted an annual business award for Indigenous Businessmen and Businesswomen as well as for mentors who assist Indigenous enterprise.

The chamber made numerous submissions to the Australian Government on business and economic issues.

== Directors ==
Directors were:

- Warren Mundine - Chairman/Director
- George Newhouse - Director
- Shane Phillips - Director

== Objectives ==
The Indigenous Chamber's stated objectives were to:

- promote trade and commerce between Indigenous and non-Indigenous Australians;
- promote international trade and commerce with Indigenous Australian businesses;
- advance Indigenous entrepreneurship;
- commission research into Indigenous economic policy and social outcomes;
- promote excellence in Indigenous economic policy making and research in relation to the Carbon Pollution Reduction Scheme;
- promote "business to business" mentoring, dialogue and networking opportunities between Indigenous and non-Indigenous Australians; and
- represent and advance the interests of Indigenous business enterprise.
