= National Justice Project =

The National Justice Project (NJP) is a not-for-profit legal service established to promote human rights, social justice and to fight against disadvantage and discrimination in Australia.

The Project includes academics, legal practitioners and advocates from a wide range of disciplines to identify, assess and conduct test-case litigation.

George Newhouse, is the Principal Solicitor of the NJP and an adjunct professor at Macquarie University Law School.

== Social Justice Clinic ==
The project operates a social justice clinic located within the Macquarie University in New South Wales.

Placements are run on campus at Macquarie Law School in partnership with leading Australian public interest legal practices. The program prepares students for work in the social justice advocacy area.

== Advocacy ==
=== Aboriginal Health Matters ===
The Aboriginal Health Matters Project (AHM) is dedicated to using the law to highlight cases of medical mistreatment of Aboriginal Australians based on policy failures and unconscious bias or racial profiling.

The AHM initiative is focused on the legal response to the problem by strategically selecting cases are aimed to:

- raise awareness about the poor treatment and outcomes for Aboriginal/Indigenous Australians on their journey through the health system – particularly focused on emergency or hospital interactions; and
- seek reform in Medical Practice and independent review of the treatment of Aboriginal/Indigenous Australians in the health system nationally.

=== Pacific Justice Project ===
The National Justice Project has galvanised Australian social justice lawyers to provide legal administrative and other support to Lawyers in Papua New Guinea, Irian Jaya, Nauru, East Timor and the Pacific Islands.

=== The Aboriginal Innocence Project ===
The Aboriginal Innocence Project is the first Innocence Project in Australia specifically dedicated to the wrongful conviction and incarceration of Aboriginal Australians. The AIP will be a vital part of the Australian social justice landscape.

In each case, the AIP aims to:

1. Correct errors (or facilitate exoneration in the event of wrongful conviction); and

2. Prevent errors (or generate research that facilitates law reform).

The AIP's strategy is to obtain a just outcome for the individual and also to influence change to ensure the injustice is not repeated. This will be achieved through research and strategic case selection by senior solicitors. The selected cases will then be reviewed, and briefs will be prepared for barristers who will act on a pro-bono basis. The Project is unique because it will commence with the strategic selection of cases relating to the wrongful conviction of Aboriginal Australians after being tried or interviewed without an interpreter or with an unqualified and/or co-accused interpreter. This will not only include cases where an appellant is non-English speaking but also when an appellant speaks “Aboriginal-English” and/or demonstrates gratuitous concurrence

=== Coronial Inquests, Refugee and Asylum seekers ===
The National Justice Project is acting in relation to a number of deaths of asylum seekers and refugees in detention. The National Justice Project is also acting for the family of young Aboriginal men and women who have died in detention or in the health system.

== Management and governance ==
The National Justice Project is governed by a board of directors that includes:

- David Radcliff Chairperson
- Jo Scard
- Elizabeth O'Shea
- Adjunct Professor George Newhouse
- Stephen Castan
- Dan Michael Mori
- Duncan Fine

The current Principal Solicitor is George Newhouse.
