= Michael Mori =

US Marine Corps officer (born 1965)

Michael D. Mori
- Born: 1965 (age 60–61); Beverly, Massachusetts
- Military career
- Allegiance: United States
- Branch: United States Marine Corps
- Service years: 1983–2012
- Rank: Lieutenant colonel
- Awards: Navy Commendation Medal; Navy and Marine Corps Achievement Medal; Marine Corps Good Conduct Medal

Michael Dante Mori, also known as Dan Mori (born 1965), is an American lawyer who attained the rank of lieutenant colonel in the United States Marine Corps. Mori was the military lawyer for Australian Guantanamo Bay detainee David Hicks.

== Early life ==
Mori was born in Beverly, Massachusetts. He spent four years in the enlisted ranks, reporting for basic training at the Marine Corps Recruit Depot Parris Island in December 1983. He served as a repair and calibration technician of electronic test equipment as an enlisted marine. After graduating in 1991 from Norwich University, a military college in Northfield, Vermont, he became an officer in the Marine Corps. In 1994, he graduated from the Western New England College School of Law in Springfield, Massachusetts, before being admitted to the bar in Massachusetts.

== Hicks case ==
Mori was appointed by the United States Department of Defense to represent David Hicks in November 2003. He handled Hicks' case through to its conclusion. He was featured on numerous occasions in the Australian media in relation to developments in the case.

Mori was one of the 2005 recipients of the American Civil Liberties Union's Roger N. Baldwin Medal of Liberty Award, which was presented "to the five military defense lawyers who represented the first round of defendants at the Guantánamo Bay tribunals and challenged the entire military commission system."

In August 2006, Mori engaged in a lecture tour of Australia on behalf of David Hicks, where he charged the Bush administration with creating an illegal military tribunal system that violated Hicks' rights. He also attended a rally in Adelaide in support of Hicks and led a march to the office of the Australian Foreign Minister, Alexander Downer.

On November 10, 2006, Mori attended the signing of the Fremantle Declaration by the attorneys-general of the states and territories of Australia. The federal attorney-general, Philip Ruddock, refused to attend. The declaration urges judicial fairness be applied in Hicks' case to protect the legal rights of Australians at home and abroad. Mori said "It's disheartening that federal ministers won't fight for an Australian citizen to have the same rights as an American."

Following Hicks' departure from Guantanamo Bay to complete his sentence in Yatala Prison, South Australia (on or about May 20, 2007) Mori was reassigned as a staff judge advocate, or legal adviser, to the commanders of Marine Corps Air Station Miramar in San Diego. He has three times been passed over for promotion since taking on the Hicks case.

Mori was presented, in June 2007, with an honorary membership of the Australian Bar Association for his defence of David Hicks. In October 2007, he was awarded a civil justice award from the Australian Lawyers Alliance as "recognition by the legal profession of unsung heroes who, despite personal risk or sacrifice, have fought to preserve individual rights, human dignity or safety".

In June 2009, he was promoted to a lieutenant colonel and made a senior military judge.

In September 2010, Mori took the Navy to court, alleging that his 2009 promotion was delayed due to bias by the selection board. In July 2012, it was reported that Mori had moved to Melbourne to practice with Australian compensation law firm Shine Lawyers. Mori's retirement from the Marine Corps became effective in October 2012.

In the Company of Cowards, a book by Mori detailing his experience defending Hicks, was published by Viking, a Penguin Australia imprint, in September 2014. Mori's book "focuses on his attempts to secure Hicks' release from an unfair system after his capture." Bilal Cleland of Australasian Muslim Times writes that "Mori's book is a valuable study in military maneuvering and cowardly politics and reveals very clearly the political opportunism of both the Bush and Howard governments." Kathy Gollan (former executive producer and editor for ABC Radio National) gives it a mixed review, writing "This book is the story of a man’s search for justice, and even if the prose is pedestrian, and the detail sometimes exhausting, it’s an appealing read." Former literary editor of The Australian, Miriam Cosic, writes in the Sydney Review of Books that "Mori goes into an enormous amount of detail in this book, which is full of names, dates, acronyms and arcane points of law. Surprisingly, the narrative doesn’t pall because of this, but maintains a gripping pace."

In January 2015, Propublica obtained a copy of Guantanamo's Chief Prosecutor, Mark S. Martin opposition to Hicks's motion to have his charges dropped. Raymond Bonner, writing in the Pacific Standard, reported that Mori, and two other lawyers who worked on Hicks's behalf, had been shown Martins's reply, where he made the "crucial concession" that "if the appeal were allowed, 'the Court should not confirm Hicks's material-support conviction.'" Bonner quoted Mori asserting, based on his review of Martins's reply that "Hicks will finally get justice."

== Career in Australia ==
Mori is on the Board of George Newhouse's National Justice Project.

== See also ==
- List of U.S. Marines
