= Steve Aczel =

Australian boxer

Personal information
- Nationality: Hungarian/Australian
- Born: 8 September 1954 (age 72) Budapest, Hungary
- Weight: light heavy/cruiser/heavyweight

Boxing career
- Stance: Orthodox

Boxing record
- Total fights: 40
- Wins: 31 (KO 27)
- Losses: 8 (KO 8)
- Draws: 1

Steve Aczel (born 8 September 1954, in Budapest) is an Australian professional light heavy/cruiser/heavyweight boxer of the 1980s, '90s and 2000s who won the Australasian light heavyweight title, Australian light heavyweight title, Australian heavyweight title, Oriental and Pacific Boxing Federation (OPBF) heavyweight title, Queensland State (Australia) heavyweight title, and Commonwealth light heavyweight title, drew with Maile Haumona for the South Pacific heavyweight title, and was a challenger for the Australian cruiserweight title against Tony Mundine, and Commonwealth cruiserweight title against Stewart Lithgo, his professional fighting weight varied from 172 lb (78 kg; 12 st 4 lb), i.e. light heavyweight to 203 1/2 lb (92.3 kg; 14 st 7.5 lb), i.e. heavyweight. He was inducted into the Australian National Boxing Hall of Fame in 2011.
