= Joel Turner (musician) =

Australian beatboxer, singer, songwriter, instrumentalist and record producer

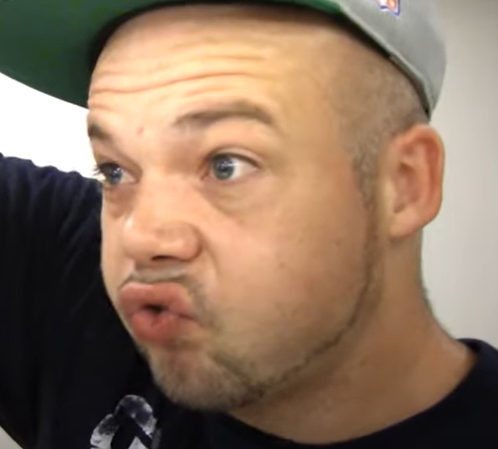
- Joel Turner in 2012

Background information
- Born: 3 March 1987 (age 39); Mullumbimby, New South Wales, Australia
- Genres: Urban, rap rock
- Occupations: Musician, record producer
- Instruments: Beatboxing, guitar, bass
- Years active: 2003–current
- Labels: Dream Dealers, Rajon, Hardwax
- Formerly of: Modern Day Poets

Joel Turner (born 3 March 1987) is an Australian beatboxer, singer, songwriter, instrumentalist and record producer best known for the Australian hit song "These Kids". As a beatboxer, he is recognised for his trademark sounds such as his "third voice", cowbell, teeth beats and bass guitar. He was the victor at the Beatbox Battle World Championship in 2005 and retained the title until 2009.

Turner first appeared at the auditions for the 2003 season of Australian Idol, where he drew attention for his beatbox skills. Although praised but deemed unsuitable for the competition, Turner was nevertheless voted "Most Popular of the Unforgettables" and performed at the 2003 Idol Grand Final at the Sydney Opera House. He was later signed and managed by Idol judge Mark Holden, together with rappers the Modern Day Poets (MDP), consisting of Turner's older brother Tim Turner (a.k.a. "DubLT" – left the group in 2005, replaced by Kitchener "KNO" Wesche) and their cousin Chris Turner (sometimes credited as Chris Heiner, a.k.a. "C4").

As of 2010, Turner has released two full-length albums and toured extensively. He has also appeared in several television commercials, most famously for Drumstick Loaded ice cream.

== Life and career ==
=== Early life (1987–2002) ===
Turner had an underprivileged childhood, growing up in the lower-middle class suburb of Acacia Ridge in Brisbane's south. His mother Grace struggled to raise five children on a sole-parent pension. According to Turner's brother Tim, "we grew up with nothing. You know – nothing. St Vinnie's clothes, no food in the pantry, nothing. Mum would get paid on Thursday and the food was gone Saturday."

Turner's father, also a guitarist (who played in Richard Clapton's band as well as various outfits around Adelaide), left before Turner was born and returned only briefly when Turner was two years old. He later died of a heroin overdose in 1999. Turner has expressed regret at not having known his father and considers his music career to be a tribute to his father's memory. "I just felt sad that I never really got the chance to know him. And because he didn't die in the nicest way. He died in a tragic way." "I've done all of this to honour his memory, because he didn't get the chance to make it in the music industry."

Turner is said to have shown an aptitude for music from a young age. He began playing drums at the age of seven but was unable to afford a drum kit of his own. He thus began using his mouth to sound the rhythms as a means of practice, initially creating beats by grinding his teeth together. Turner was originally inspired by the vocal techniques of pop star Billy Ocean on his track Love Zone. In 2001, after being informed by a friend that what he was doing was an artform known as "beatboxing", Turner was inspired to develop his skills further, studying the genre and its artists, practising constantly and competing in battles. In addition to his background in percussion, Turner has reportedly sung since the age of seven and played guitar since nine.

=== Australian Idol, Joel Turner and the Modern Day Poets (2003–2005) ===
Joel Turner and the Modern Day Poets
- Origin: Australia
- Genres: Beatboxing, hip hop
- Years active: 2003-2005
- Past members: Joel Turner; Tim Turner (a.k.a. "DubLT"); Chris Turner (a.k.a. C4); Kitchener Wesche (a.k.a. KNO)

Turner began performing and writing songs with his family members as a child. Along with his cousin, he joined his brother in the group Modern Day Poets, which was later changed to "Joel Turner and the Modern Day Poets" to capitalize on Turner's fame through Australian Idol. It was Turner's cousin who suggested the trio audition for the show, as nothing more than a bit of a fun and an opportunity to gain exposure.

The genesis of the song "These Kids" occurred in December 2001 when Turner's brother asked him to compose some music for the lyrics he had written. The track was originally recorded in Cairns, Queensland, with funding from a family friend. It was this demo recording that would later help the group to secure a record contract with Mark Holden, who had been impressed with Turner's beatboxing and guitar skills and had asked to hear some songs from him. After the track's release, the group received a great deal of feedback from young people who identified with the issues mentioned in the song, such as drugs, depression, suicide, and living on the streets.

Following his signing to Holden's label Dream Dealers in early 2004, Turner spent the year recording and promoting his debut album and appearing at events such as the Nickelodeon Kids' Choice Awards, Telethon, and the Youth Alive Festival. He also appeared at the Australian Idol final for 2004 with a symphony orchestra and six beatboxers known as the Beatbox Alliance, who were assembled via a competition on Australian Idol judged by Turner and Holden.

Turner's first single "These Kids" was written by DubLT after a friend committed suicide and was later dedicated to Joel Turner's troubled childhood neighbour and friend. It debuted in the top 5 of the Australian singles charts in October 2004. The single reached number one on the Australian singles chart and remains the highest-selling release by an Australian hip-hop act ever.

The self-titled Joel Turner and the Modern Day Poets album was released on 1 November 2004 and was hailed by Beat magazine as "the most accomplished and shockingly brilliant debut of 2004". Most of the songs featured Turner's vocal percussion, alongside eight tracks of pure beatboxing. Guests on the album included boxer Anthony Mundine rapping on a track called "Knock U Out" (released as the second single and reached #14; Turner and the Modern Day Poets also performed at one of Mundine's bouts on the Gold Coast), as well as Australian Idol contestants Rebekah LaVauney and Axle Whitehead, with Whitehead appearing on the track "Scatbox". The album reached the top 30 of the ARIA albums chart and achieved platinum status. The third single was "Funk U Up", which debuted at No. 17 on the ARIA charts in May 2005 and peaked at No. 13. A fourth single titled "Respect" was released in October 2005, reaching No. 29.

In January 2005, Turner and the Modern Day Poets embarked on their first national tour, accompanied by the Beatbox Alliance and multi-instrumentalist Dylan Hartas. In addition to shows at various pubs, clubs, schools and theatres, high-profile gigs on the tour included the Big Day Out Festival, the Melbourne International Music Festival/Tsunami Benefit (where Turner also performed with Michael Franti and Spearhead), 5th Element, the Channel V Billabong Detour, the Byron Bay East Coast Blues and Roots Festival, the West Coast Blues and Roots Festival, and the Cosmonautical Youth Festival.

In March 2005, Turner appeared at the TV Week Logie Awards after show and also attended the MTV Australia Video Music Awards, where he was nominated for the "Supernova" Award.

During the middle stages of 2005, Turner and his crew took part in the Coke Live '05 Sessions – a series of gigs for Under 18's held across Australia in de-licensed venues. In July, Turner had the honour of opening for US rapper Ice-T at a concert in Melbourne. Other performances during this time included Warriors Realm IV and the Nova Pimp parties held across Australia, as well as the Stylin' Up Festival in Brisbane, the Supernatural Conference, and the Exoday Festival in Bundaberg.

In September 2005, Turner was crowned World Beatbox Champion at the Hip Hop World Challenge in Leipzig, Germany, where his conquests included the UK champion Faith SFX and Belgian champ RoxorLoops. He also paired with Beatbox Alliance member Tom Thum (as the duo "Attention Deficit Disaudio") to win the Team World Championship.

On returning to Australia, Turner was a special guest artist at the 2005 Schools Musical Spectacular in Bendigo and performed with 2003 Idol winner Guy Sebastian at the Nickelodeon Kids' Choice Awards. He was also a judge at Australian Idol's "Are You a Natural" competition. A DVD titled Joel Turner and the Modern Day Poets with the Beatbox Alliance was released in October 2005, which documented Turner's touring experiences and included live footage from the West Coast Blues and Roots Festival held earlier in the year.

Around this time, Turner and the Modern Day Poets received three nominations for Australia's prestigious ARIA Awards – Best Independent Release and Best Urban Release for their self-titled album, and Breakthrough Artist (Single) for "These Kids". The group would later receive an ARIA No. 1 Chart Award in honour of their debut single.

=== Move to Hardwax, Out of the Box and assault (2006–2008) ===
For the remainder of 2005 and into 2006, Turner continued to perform gigs with both the Modern Day Poets and Attention Deficit Disaudio partner Tom Thumb, notably appearing on stage at a show by beatboxing legend Rahzel in Brisbane. Turner also spent time performing at various schools throughout Australia, as well as events such as the Pacific Brands Fashion Show, Foxtel's 10th Birthday celebrations, the Sydney and Melbourne Auto Salon exhibitions, and the 2006 Gold Coast Big Day Out. In addition, Turner and MDP made their acting debut, appearing in two episodes of the interactive comedy Forget the Rules.

In January 2006, Turner undertook a televised performance with his band and special guest Axle Whitehead at the Australia Day Live Concert in Canberra. In a corresponding interview with music show Video Hits, Turner revealed that they had left their deal with Mark Holden and were looking to start their own record label.

Subsequent gigs included the Australian Hip Hop United benefit concert, Parkfest, the Bring It On Youth Festival, and Force '06. In April 2006, Turner made frequent appearances at the Royal Easter Show in Sydney, performing several shows a day and hosting beatbox workshops.

In June, Turner and the Modern Day Poets performed at the APRA songwriting awards in Sydney, where they had two songs nominated in the "Most Performed Urban Work" category. Turner spent the latter half of 2006 working on a new album and also formed a production company called Two Kingz Produktionz with up-and-coming Brisbane MC Preech. In October 2006, it was announced that Turner had signed a new deal with Rajon Music for himself and his company Modern Day Productions.

In early 2007, Turner released a single named "All Night Long" featuring Israel, Stan Bravo and C4 (AUS#38 March 2007). He also spent time recording in London, where he was invited to perform at a show by legendary hip-hoppers De La Soul. Turner later toured public schools in Canberra, such as Lyneham High School and Alfred Deakin High School, as well as others around Australia in support of his association with "Just Dream", a program aimed at imparting teenagers with values such as non-violence and accountability. Turner also made a return to the small screen, performing on the "Friday Night Live" edition of reality TV show Big Brother.

On 29 July 2007, Turner suffered a badly broken jaw after being struck in the face with a fence paling while attempting to break up a fight at a party in suburban Brisbane. He was admitted to hospital where he underwent surgery to have his jaw wired back together. Turner subsequently resumed performing less than a month after the incident occurred, in spite of doctors' orders. He later maintained in the August edition of S-press magazine that the attack had not fazed him.

August 2007 saw the release of a new single "City of Dreams" featuring C4 (Modern Day Poets) and KNO (Beatbox Alliance, Modern Day Poets). It debuted at No. 60 on the ARIA singles charts, but promptly rose to No. 30 despite an absence of airplay. The video for the song (showcasing Turner's hometown of Brisbane) was released online in conjunction with a 15-minute documentary titled This Kid. Along with an uncensored version of "City of Dreams", the documentary included footage of Turner revisiting his old neighbourhood of Acacia Ridge and previewing forthcoming tunes on acoustic guitar.

Turner's much-delayed second album Out of the Box was eventually released on 6 October 2007 through Central Station's hip-hop sub-label Hardwax. It included collaborations with members of De La Soul and the Modern Day Poets, as well as UK rapper Mystro and Australian artist Preech. Although Turner considered it to be superior to his debut release, the album was overlooked by critics and did not achieve the commercial success of its predecessor.

Having recovered from his injury, Turner set about touring his second album Out of the Box, performing in schools and venues in cities across Australia. He headlined events such as the Urban Youth Arts Warehouse Fest, Xposed, and the Buzz Monkey National Breakdancing Championships, then spent early December performing several shows a day at the ASIMO exhibition in his hometown of Brisbane. Turner also received a further two nominations in the Urban division of the APRA Awards held in mid-June 2008.

Aside from occasional television appearances, Turner spent most of 2008 away from the public eye, his only prominent performances taking place during De La Soul's set at the Gold Coast's Summafieldayze Festival in January and Melbourne's "Make a Change Concert" in April.

In October the same year, Turner submitted a victim impact statement to the Beenleigh District Court and declared that the broken jaw he sustained in 2007 had rendered him unable to adequately promote his second album Out of the Box, which he claimed was detrimental to the album's sales. The court was told that Turner's recovery period had also cost him money in lost earnings. Describing the assault as unprovoked and gratuitously violent, the prosecutor stated: "The attack nearly pulled the plug on his beatbox career." Turner's attacker was consequently sentenced to jail. During a November feature story on Nine Network news program A Current Affair, Turner spoke out about the impact of the assault and was reportedly working on a new album.

=== Future direction (2009 onward) ===
His appearances in 2009 included a performance at Brisbane's Autumn Urban Fiesta and a support slot for De La Soul's 20th Anniversary Australian tour. Turner's single "City of Dreams" was later nominated for the APRA Awards' Urban Work of the Year for the second year in a row.

The second half of 2009 saw Turner headlining annual indigenous youth festival Stylin' Up before taking part in Easterfest Spotlight's "A Jazzmagical Christmas" spectacular. He also lent his support to the White Ribbon Foundation's Men in the Mall event as part of their campaign for the resolution of violence against women. He performed at Ibiza Downunder showcase on Australia Day 2009, and was reported to be planning a "Learn to Beatbox" DVD, but this release never came to pass. A third album was planned for 2010 but was never released. Years later, he tried to crowdsource a third album, but so far this has yet to eventuate. In 2019, he announced he was releasing new music later in the year On August 19, 2022, Joel released the song Mullet on Spotify.

== Artistry ==
=== Influences ===
He cites his musical influences as blues legends B.B. King, Eric Clapton, Carlos Santana, Jimi Hendrix and Stevie Ray Vaughan, as well as hip-hop artists such as Tupac Shakur, Bone Thugs-N-Harmony, Dr. Dre, Ice Cube and Cypress Hill.

== Discography ==
- Joel Turner and the Modern Day Poets (2004)
- Out of the Box (2007)

== Awards and nominations ==
=== ARIA Music Awards ===
The ARIA Music Awards is an annual awards ceremony that recognises excellence, innovation, and achievement across all genres of Australian music. They commenced in 1987.

Year	Nominee / work	Award	Result	Ref.
2005	"These Kids"	Breakthrough Artist – Single	Nominated	
2005	Joel Turner and the Modern Day Poets	Best Independent Release	Nominated	
2005	Joel Turner and the Modern Day Poets	Best Urban Album	Nominated	

=== APRA Awards ===
The APRA Awards are held in Australia and New Zealand by the Australasian Performing Right Association to recognise songwriting skills, sales and airplay performance by its members annually

Year	Nominee / work	Award	Result
2006	"These Kids"	Most Performed Urban Work	Nominated
2006	"Funk U Up"	Most Performed Urban Work	Nominated
2008	"All Night Long"	Urban Work of the Year	Nominated
2008	"City of Dreams"	Urban Work of the Year	Nominated
2009	"All Night Long"	Urban Work of the Year	Nominated

=== Beatboxing ===
Event	Year	Category	Status
Hip Hop World Challenge	2005	Solo Male	Winner
Hip Hop World Challenge	2005	Team	Winner
