= Lynette Riley =

Australian academic

Lynette Riley AO
- Born: 1956 (age 69–70); Dubbo, New South Wales, Australia
- Other names: Lynette Riley-Mundine, Lynette Mundine
- Occupations: Academic, artist
- Spouse: Warren Mundine (1984–c.2008)

Lynette Riley AO (born 1956) is a professor of Aboriginal Education and Indigenous Studies in the School of Education and Social Work at the University of Sydney. Riley is a Wiradjuri and Gamilaroi woman from Dubbo and Moree. She is known for her promotion of Aboriginal culture, in particular her kinship presentations and the associated online module.

== Personal life ==
Riley was born in 1956 in Dubbo, New South Wales. She completed her schooling at Dubbo High School before completing teacher training at Armidale College of Advanced Education in 1977. Her first posting as a teacher was at Moree, New South Wales.

In 1983 Riley shared a house with politician Linda Burney and contemporary Indigenous visual artist Michael Riley.

Riley wed Aboriginal leader and politician Warren Mundine in 1984 at St Andrew's Congregational Church in Balmain, Sydney, and raised seven children with him (two from his previous marriage and one a foster child). The couple renewed their vows in 2003 at St Brigid's Catholic Church, Dubbo. They separated in 2006, and then again in 2008, at which time she changed her surname back to Riley.

== Career ==
Riley has education experience in a range of organisations including primary schools, high schools, TAFE and universities. In addition to teaching and research, Riley has also been actively involved in state government policy, for example as Acting Director of Aboriginal Education and Training NSW DET in 2002-2005.

From 1986 Riley became a Research Fellow at the University of New England. She founded the Aboriginal Student Support Centre, "Oorala Centre" at the University and went on to establish the Frank Archibald Memorial Lecture series focusing on Aboriginal issues.

By 2013 she was a Senior Lecturer in Indigenous Studies at the University of Sydney.

Riley completed her PhD entitled, Conditions of academic success for Aboriginal students in school, in 2015. As part of this research, she conducted comprehensive qualitative research into high achieving students in NSW, finding that the high achieving Aboriginal students in NSW surveyed have a strong and positive sense of their cultural identity.

She was a finalist in the 2021 New South Wales Aboriginal Woman of the Year.

In the 2023 King's Birthday Honours Riley was appointed an Officer of the Order of Australia for "distinguished service to education, particularly through the development of Indigenous curriculum and student support, to reconciliation, and to the community".

In September 2024, Riley was promoted to a full professorship at University of Sydney, becoming the first Indigenous person to achieve this in the history of her school. She is believed to possibly be the first Indigenous person from western New South Wales to achieve a full professor role.

== Kinship Module ==
In July 2014, the University of Sydney launched the online learning tool 'Kinship Module' which aims to increase understanding of indigenous culture. The content of this online module was largely based on research conducted by Riley and her colleagues Janet Mooney and Deirdre Howard-Wagner. Riley has been conducting Kinship presentations for a variety of audiences for many years with great success.

== Works ==
- Roberts, Bryn; Riley-Mundine, Lynette (1990). A review of the National Aboriginal Languages Program. Canberra: Pitman Roberts and Partners. ISBN 9780642155771.
- Jane Moore; Lynette Riley (2010). "Chapter 9. Aboriginal mother yarns". In Susan Goodwin and Kate Huppatz (ed.). The good mother : contemporary motherhoods in Australia. University Of Sydney, N.S.W.: Sydney University Press. pp. 175–194. ISBN 9781920899530.
