= All Night Long (Joel Turner song) =

Single by Joel Turner featuring Israel, Stan Bravo & C4
- Released: 24 February 2007
- Recorded: 2006
- Genre: Urban
- Length: 3:35
- Label: Rajon/Hardwax
- Songwriter(s): Joel Turner; Israel; Stan Bravo; C4
- Producer(s): Joel Turner; Israel

Joel Turner singles chronology
"Respect" (2005)	"All Night Long" (2007)	"City of Dreams" (2007)

C4 singles chronology
"All Night Long" (2007)	"City of Dreams" (2007)

Israel singles chronology
"So Hot Right Now" (2005)	"All Night Long" (2007)	"Do It Again" (2007)

Stan Bravo singles chronology
"All Night Long" (2007)

"All Night Long" is an independent hip-hop single by Australian artist Joel Turner. It was released on 24 February 2007 and received moderate airplay on television and radio, with influential music show Video Hits screening it only once.

The song carries a party theme, with the rapping provided by Israel (an R&B singer and producer), Stan Bravo (an American-born rapper), and Turner's cousin C4 (of the Modern Day Poets). The accompanying video shows the performers and several female dancers against a backdrop of special effects. The final shot has Turner baring a T-shirt emblazoned with the words "NO WAR".

Although the artist is credited as "Joel Turner featuring Israel, Stan Bravo and C4", Turner in fact only contributes to the chorus and ad-libs, along with a few beatbox sound effects. The track does not appear on any of Turner's albums, but a version of the song can be found on Stan Bravo's mixtape Get Accustomed.

"All Night Long" was released jointly by Turner's former record company Rajon and his current label Hardwax. Despite topping the independent charts, the song debuted at #38 on the ARIA charts and is Turner's lowest charting single to date. It received a nomination for Urban Work of the Year at the 2008 APRA Awards.

== Track listing ==
1. "All Night Long"
  Writers: Joel Turner, Israel, Stan Bravo, C4
  Producers: Joel Turner, Israel
2. "JBIGZ Freestyle 01"
  Writer: Joel Turner
  Producer: Joel Turner
3. "All Night Long" (Summertime Remix)
  Writers: Joel Turner, Israel, Stan Bravo, C4
  Producer: Israel
4. "JBIGZ Freestyle 02"
  Writer: Joel Turner
  Producer: Joel Turner
5. "All Night Long" (Weapon X Remix)
  Writers: Joel Turner, Israel, Stan Bravo, C4
  Producer: Weapon X
6. "All Night Long" (Instrumental)
  Executive Producer: Paul Paoliello

== Charts ==
Chart performance for "All Night Long"
Chart (2007)	Peak position
Australia (ARIA)	38
