= Funk U Up =

Single by Joel Turner and the Modern Day Poets

from the album Joel Turner and the Modern Day Poets
- Released: 2 May 2005
- Recorded: 2004
- Genre: Hip hop, funk
- Length: 4:15
- Label: Dream Dealers
- Songwriters: Joel Turner; Tim Turner; Chris Turner
- Producers: Joel Turner; Craig Porteils

Joel Turner and the Modern Day Poets singles chronology
| "Knock U Out" (2005) | "Funk U Up" (2005) | "Respect" (2005) |

"Funk U Up" is the third single from Joel Turner and the Modern Day Poets' self-titled album Joel Turner and the Modern Day Poets.

The song is a blend of hip hop and Turner's 70s funk guitar stylings. The rapping is courtesy of the Modern Day Poets, while Turner performs the instrumentation, chorus, bridge, and a beatboxing solo. "Funk U Up" is one of the few tracks on Turner's debut album that contains a real beat rather than vocal percussion. Lyrically, it is said to be about "getting women to dance and for men to stop drinking at the bar, get off their bar stools and join the ladies on the dance floor".

The video for the song features both live and candid footage of Turner and his crew on their first national tour, much of which also appears on the DVD Joel Turner and the Modern Day Poets with the Beatbox Alliance. There are also black-and-white scenes of the gang performing the song in a Newcastle hotel room. As a side note, the director Amiel Courtin-Wilson claims that of all the clips he has done for the group, this is the one that Turner is happiest with.

"Funk U Up", which was released on May 2, 2005, peaked at #13 on the ARIA singles chart and spent two weeks at number 1 in Turner's home state of Queensland. It was also nominated for Most Performed Urban Work at the 2006 APRA Awards.

== Track listing ==
1. "Funk U Up"
  Writers: J. Turner, T. Turner, C. Heiner
  Producers: Joel Turner, Craig Porteils
2. "Throw Your Hands Up"
  Writer: J. Turner
  Producer: Mr. Timothy
3. "Knock U Out" (Video)

== Charts ==
| Chart (2005) | Peak position |
|---|---|
| Australia (ARIA) | 13 |
| Australian Urban (ARIA) | 10 |
