= Out of the Box (Joel Turner album) =

Studio album by Joel Turner
- Released: 6 October 2007
- Recorded: 2006–2007
- Genre: Urban
- Label: Hardwax
- Producers: Colin Emmanuel; Joel Turner; Preech; Me-One; Cliffhanger

Joel Turner chronology
Joel Turner and the Modern Day Poets (2004)	Out of the Box (2007)

Singles from Out of the Box
- 1. "City of Dreams" Released: 25 August 2007

Out of the Box is the second studio album from Joel Turner. It was first planned for release in early 2006 but did not reach stores until 6 October 2007. No reason has been given for the many postponements.

The album was largely produced by UK artist Colin "C-Swing" Emmanuel, with pre-production duties shared by Turner and his Two Kingz Produktionz partner Preech. Following on from Turner's self-titled debut, Out of the Box is again an eclectic mix of styles and features hip-hop blended with undertones of R&B, pop, rock, reggae and techno.

Musically, the album is centered on strong beats, catchy hooks and guitar-based melodies. The lyrical content focuses on a variety of social, political and personal themes, in addition to more lighthearted tracks such as "Dope", "La", "1, 2, 3" and "Going On". Apart from a few short skits and some vocal percussion on songs, the album sees less of an emphasis on beatboxing than its predecessor, with Turner keen to reserve his best material for live performances. Turner also performs vocals, guitar and bass on the album.

Although Turner’s second album saw him marketed for the first time as a solo artist, Out of the Box is in fact a collaboration with various MCs, with Turner’s Modern Day Poets colleagues C4 and KNO featuring the most extensively. Other tracks see contributions from Preech and London-based artist Me-One, while a couple of De La Soul members also appear – Dave Jolicoeur on the track "You" and Posdnous on the remix of Turner's 2004 hit "These Kids". Furthermore, UK rappers Mystro and Torsion (the latter of Da Mighty Elementz) appear on "La" and the anti-war ballad "Why" respectively.

Out of the Box did not make the ARIA top 100 albums chart but reached the top 30 of the urban albums chart. The only single to be released was "City of Dreams", which reached the top 30 of the singles chart in September 2007. During a court case in October 2008, Turner blamed the album's poor sales on insufficient promotion due to being sidelined by an attack that left him with a broken jaw.

== Track listing ==
1. "Intro" (featuring Me-One)
  Writers: Joel Turner, Me-One
  Producer: Me-One
2. "Dope" (featuring C4 & KNO)
  Writers: Joel Turner, C4, KNO
  Producer: Colin Emmanuel
3. "Don't Feel" (featuring KNO)
  Writers: Joel Turner, KNO
  Producer: Colin Emmanuel
4. "Beat Box Interlude"
  Writer: Joel Turner
  Producer: Joel Turner
5. "La" (featuring Mystro)
  Writers: Joel Turner, Mystro, Colin Emmanuel
  Producer: Colin Emmanuel
6. "JBigz Freestyle 1"
  Writer: Joel Turner
  Producers: Two Kingz Produktionz
7. "City of Dreams" (featuring C4 & KNO)
  Writers: Joel Turner, C4, KNO, Shaunne Diamond
  Producer: Colin Emmanuel
8. "We're On Fire" (featuring C4 & KNO)
  Writers: Joel Turner, C4, KNO
  Producer: Colin Emmanuel
9. "You" (featuring Dave of De La Soul)
  Writers: Joel Turner, Dave Jolicoeur, Daniel de Bourg, Colin Emmanuel
  Producer: Colin Emmanuel
10. "From the Streets" (featuring KNO & Preech)
  Writers: Joel Turner, KNO, Preech
  Producer: Colin Emmanuel
11. "1,2,3" (featuring Preech)
  Writers: Joel Turner, Preech
  Producers: Two Kingz Produktionz
12. "Going On" (featuring C4 & KNO)
  Writers: Joel Turner, C4, KNO
  Producer: Colin Emmanuel
13. "Beat Box Night @ the Studio"
  Writer: Joel Turner
  Producer: Cliffhanger
14. "Why" (featuring Torsion of Da Mighty Elementz & KNO)
  Writers: Joel Turner, Torsion, KNO
  Producer: Colin Emmanuel
15. "Byron" (featuring C4)
  Writers: Joel Turner, C4, Shaunne Diamond
  Producer: Colin Emmanuel
16. "Battle" (featuring C4 & KNO)
  Writers: Joel Turner, C4, KNO
  Producer: Colin Emmanuel
17. "Outro"
  Writers: Joel Turner, Colin Emmanuel
  Producer: Colin Emmanuel
18. "These Kids" Remix (featuring Pos of De La Soul) (bonus track)
  Writers: Joel Turner, Tim Turner
  Producer: Colin Emmanuel
