= Joel Turner and the Modern Day Poets (album) =

Studio album by Joel Turner and the Modern Day Poets
- Released: 1 November 2004
- Recorded: 2004
- Genre: Urban
- Label: Dream Dealers
- Producer: Joel Turner; Steve Scanlon; Craig Porteils; Axle Whitehead; Jack Gregor; Gary Deleo

Joel Turner chronology
Joel Turner and the Modern Day Poets (2004)	Out of the Box (2007)

Singles from Joel Turner and the Modern Day Poets
- 1. "These Kids" Released: 27 September 2004; 2. "Knock U Out" Released: 24 January 2005; 3. "Funk U Up" Released: 2 May 2005; 4. "Respect" Released: 17 October; 5. "Claude's Chorus 2005"

Professional ratings
Review scores
Source	Rating
Howlspace	link
Howzat	link
Music Australia Guide	link
Undercover	link

Joel Turner and the Modern Day Poets is a collaborative studio album by Joel Turner and the Modern Day Poets. It was released on 1 November 2004, peaking at number 28 on the ARIA Albums Chart and number 2 on the AIR independent charts, additionally achieving platinum status.

The album consists of twelve full songs and eight beatboxing skits. It is best described as hip hop fused with a mixture of rock, pop, R&B, funk, soul and jazz. The music generally consists of Turner's vocal percussion and guitar, with the Modern Day Poets (Turner's brother and cousin) providing the rap. Many of the tracks pertain to real-life issues.

Guest artists on the album include Australian Idol contestants Axle Whitehead and Rebekah LaVauney. Hence, the song "Scatbox" is a combination of Whitehead's scatting and Turner's beatboxing, while LaVauney performs vocals on the track "Behind Bars", a song she wrote about a partner's incarceration. In addition, boxer Anthony Mundine is heard rapping on the album's second single "Knock U Out", and former CDB singer Gary Pinto provides backing vocals on the song "Lady".

The album was well received by critics and spawned four successful singles. It was also nominated for Best Urban Release and Best Independent Release at the 2005 ARIA Awards.

== Track listing ==
1. "These Kids" (radio edit)
  Writers: J. Turner, T. Turner
  Producers: Joel Turner, Steve Scanlon
2. "Beethoven Beats" (Beatbox track)
3. "Funk U Up"
  Writers: J. Turner, T. Turner, C. Turner
  Producers: Joel Turner, Craig Porteils
4. "Knock U Out"
  Writers: T. Turner, J. Turner, C. Turner, J. Peterik, F. Sullivan III
  Producers: Joel Turner, Craig Porteils
5. "Drum and Bass" (Beatbox track)
6. "Respect"
  Writers: J. Turner, T. Turner, C. Turner, M. Puni, B. Bouro
  Producers: Joel Turner, Craig Porteils
7. "Scatbox"
  Writers: J. Turner, A. Whitehead, C. Porteils
  Producers: Joel Turner, Axle Whitehead, Craig Porteils
8. "Turn Up the Bass" (Beatbox track)
9. "Lady"
  Writers: J. Turner, T. Turner, C. Turner
  Producers: Joel Turner, Craig Porteils
10. "Jungle Rhythm" (Beatbox track)
11. "Behind Bars"
  Writers: J. Turner, T. Turner, C. Turner, R. LaVauney
  Producers: Joel Turner, Craig Porteils
12. "Hip Hop"
  Writers: J. Turner, T. Turner, C. Turner, C. MacAvoy
  Producers: Joel Turner, Craig Porteils
13. "Rally Car" (Beatbox track)
14. "Up in the Studio"
  Writers: J. Turner, T. Turner, C. Turner
  Producers: Joel Turner, Craig Porteils
15. "Teeth" (Beatbox track)
16. "The Real JT"
  Writer: J. Turner
  Producers: Joel Turner, Gary Deleo
17. "These Kids" (Scanmix)
  Writers: J. Turner, T. Turner
  Producers: Joel Turner, Steve Scanlon
18. "The Big JT" (Beatbox track)
19. "Brisbane City"
  Writers: J. Turner, T. Turner, C. Turner, J. MacAvoy
  Producers: Joel Turner, Craig Porteils
20. "Smoker" (Beatbox track)

== Charts ==
Chart (2004/05)	Peak position
Australian Albums (ARIA)	28

== Certifications ==
Region	Certification	Certified units/sales
Australia (ARIA)	Platinum	70,000^{^}
^{^} Shipments figures based on certification alone.
