= City of Dreams (Joel Turner song) =

Single by Joel Turner featuring C4 & KNO

from the album Out of the Box
- Released: 25 August 2007
- Recorded: 2006
- Genre: Urban
- Length: 4:35
- Label: Hardwax
- Songwriter(s): Joel Turner; Chris Heiner; Kitchener Wesche; Shaunne Diamond
- Producer(s): Colin Emmanuel

Joel Turner singles chronology
"All Night Long" (2007)	"City of Dreams" (2007)

C4 singles chronology
"All Night Long" (2007)	"City of Dreams" (2007)

KNO singles chronology
"City of Dreams" (2007)

"City of Dreams" is the first single from Joel Turner's second studio album Out of the Box. It was released on 25 August 2007 and features Turner on vocals, beatbox and acoustic guitar, with rappers C4 and KNO (of the Modern Day Poets) performing the verses. An uncensored version of the track is included on the CD single and the Out of the Box album.

The song, which includes a strong R&B aspect, is a declaration of the performers' passion for the hip hop culture and their hometown of Brisbane. The video contains both colour and black-and-white scenes and opens with footage of a cypher led by KNO and New York MC Lee Majaz, taken from the online documentary This Kid. Also featured in the clip are shots of the Brisbane River and city skyline, as well as scenes filmed at a local skate park, inside a train station, and at Turner's childhood home.

In a promotional interview for the Out of the Box album, Turner stated that "City of Dreams" was released as lead single at the behest of his record company Hardwax. "Personally 'City of Dreams' wasn't one of my favourites but the record company liked it and they said it was the most versatile track at the time because I was singing, playing guitar and beat boxing on it, but I like it as well because it talks about where you're from and believing in your city of dreams."

Despite Turner's previous chart successes, "City of Dreams" was not picked up by major radio and had a slow start on music television, forcing his label to rely largely on the Internet and live performances in order to reach listeners. Promotion was also hampered by Turner's broken jaw, which he had suffered less than a month before the single's release. Nevertheless, the song reached number 30 on the ARIA Charts in its second week (number 15 on the physical singles chart). It later received a nomination for Urban Work of the Year at the 2008 APRA Awards and again in 2009.

== Track listing ==
1. "City of Dreams" (Clean Version)
  Writers: Joel Turner, Chris Heiner, Kitchener Wesche, Shaunn Diamond
  Producer: Colin Emmanuel
2. "City of Dreams" (Album Version)
  Writers: Joel Turner, Chris Heiner, Kitchener Wesche, Shaunn Diamond
  Producer: Colin Emmanuel
3. "Turn Up the Bass" (Beatbox skit)
  Writer: Joel Turner
  Producer: Joel Turner
4. "Jungle Rhythm" (Beatbox skit)
  Writer: Joel Turner
  Producer: Joel Turner
5. "1,2,3" (featuring Preech)
  Writers: Joel Turner, Preech
  Producers: Joel Turner, Preech

== Charts ==
Chart (2007)	Peak position
Australia (ARIA)	30
