= Warren Mundine =

Australian politician (born 1956)

Warren Mundine AO
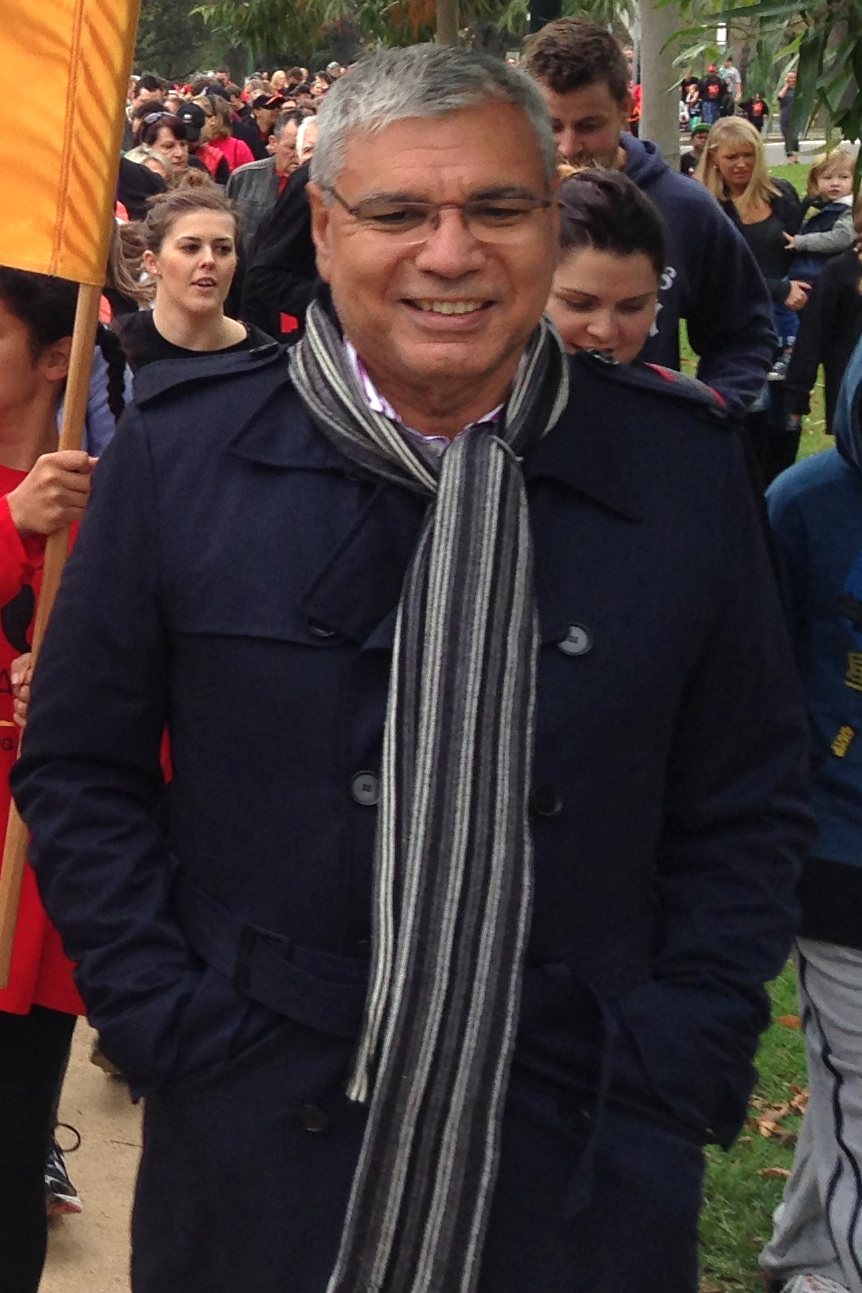
- Mundine on The Long Walk in 2014

National President of the Labor Party
- In office 26 January 2006 – 10 January 2007
- Preceded by: Barry Jones
- Succeeded by: John Faulkner

Personal details
- Born: Nyunggai Warren Stephen Mundine; 11 August 1956 (age 70) Grafton, New South Wales, Australia
- Party: Liberal (since 2019)
- Other political affiliations: Labor (1995–2012)
- Spouses: Jenny Ross (m. 1975; div. 1982) Lynette Riley (m. 1984; div. 2008) Elizabeth Henderson (m. 2013)
- Children: 10

Nyunggai Warren Stephen Mundine (born 11 August 1956) is an Australian businessman, political strategist, advocate for Indigenous affairs, and former politician. Starting his political career in 1995, Mundine became the first Indigenous person to serve on the Dubbo Regional Council in New South Wales. He was the national president of the Australian Labor Party (ALP) from 2006 to 2007 but quit the party in 2012. In 2013, Mundine was appointed chairman of the Coalition government's Indigenous Advisory Council by then-prime minister, Tony Abbott. Mundine was the Liberal Party's unsuccessful candidate for the marginal seat of Gilmore on the south coast of New South Wales in the 2019 Australian federal election.

As of 2023, Mundine was a lead campaigner for the successful "No" campaign in the lead-up to the 2023 Australian referendum on the Indigenous Voice to Parliament.

He holds various roles in Indigenous initiatives, including Andrew Forrest's Generation One, and received the Officer of the Order of Australia in 2016.

== Early life and education ==
Mundine was born on 11 August 1956 in Grafton, New South Wales.

A member of the Bundjalung people, the traditional owners of much of coastal northern New South Wales, Mundine was the ninth of eleven children of a family consisting of eight boys and three girls. Through his mother, he is also a descendant of the Yuin and Irish peoples. He is the younger brother of the inaugural Elder of the Australian Army Roy Mundine, social justice champion Kaye Mundine, and artist Djon Mundine, the cousin of boxer Tony Mundine, second cousin of Anthony Mundine, the boxer and footballer and Uncle to the CEO of Reconciliation Australia Karen Mundine.

In 1963, his family settled in the western Sydney suburb of Auburn. Mundine went to the Catholic Benedict Marist Brothers College, and was a fitter and turner after leaving school. Mundine worked as a barman at night and as an office trolley boy during the day, and later attended night college to earn his Higher School Certificate.

Following a job at the Australian Taxation Office, Mundine moved to Adelaide where he earned a community development diploma at South Australian Institute of Technology. He commenced, but did not complete, a qualification in law.

== Politics ==
In 1995, Mundine began his foray into politics as an independent candidate for the City of Dubbo council in central-west New South Wales. He was the first Aboriginal person to serve on the body, and later became deputy mayor of Dubbo.

=== Australian Labor Party ===
At the 1999 state election, Mundine stood as the NSW Labor candidate for the seat of Dubbo. At the 2001 federal election, Mundine was placed third on the Labor Senate ticket for NSW. In 2004, he sought to stand as the ALP candidate for the Division of Fowler in the House of Representatives, but lost the preselection battle to sitting Labor MP, Julia Irwin.

Mundine succeeded Barry Jones as President of the ALP, beginning his term on 28 January 2006, and became the first indigenous Australian to serve as president of an Australian political party. During his tenure, Mundine pushed for the selection of candidates of Aboriginal background. Mundine served just one term as national president, stepping down in 2007. In March 2012, he expressed an interest in becoming Labor's first federal Aboriginal member of federal parliament, following the resignation of Mark Arbib from the Senate.

After the selection of former Premier of New South Wales Bob Carr to replace Arbib, Mundine left the Labor Party. In an interview with The Australian, Mundine explained that he had been a supporter of "Hawke-Keating Labor, which was about economic development and progress, and working with unions to get good outcomes for everyone", but that, by 2012, the ALP was "no longer the party I joined" and had failed to keep up with the conservative parties in selecting Indigenous candidates.

=== Liberal Democrats ===
In 2018 Mundine was a member of the Liberal Democrat party (now known as the Libertarian Party) and was considered as a potential Senate candidate. He later left that party to seek endorsement as a candidate for the Liberal Party.

=== Liberal Party ===
Following the election of the Tony Abbott-led Liberal-National coalition in 2013, Abbott appointed Mundine as chairman of the Australian government's Indigenous Advisory Council. In January 2017, Mundine lost his position when the council was dissolved by the prime minister, Malcolm Turnbull.

On 22 January 2019, at the behest of the prime minister, Scott Morrison, the New South Wales state executive of the Liberal Party installed Mundine as candidate for the seat of Gilmore in the 2019 federal election, although he had only joined the party that week. The state executive waived the usual waiting period for new party members, and withdrew the endorsement of Grant Schultz, who had been preselected as the party's candidate eight months previously. Mundine failed to be elected, and Gilmore was one of only three government seats won by the Labor Party at the election.

Mundine nominated to contest Bradfield in the 2025 federal election, but lost preselection to Gisele Kapterian.

Mundine is associated with the conservative faction of the NSW Liberal Party.

== Political positions ==
=== Australia Day and treaty ===
Mundine supports changing the date of Australia Day and Indigenous treaties in Australia.

=== Nuclear power ===
In the late 2000s, Mundine emerged as a public supporter of nuclear industrial development in Australia, arguing that, in response to climate change, nuclear power should not be ruled out of Australia's future energy mix. His former directorship of the Australian Uranium Association attracted criticism from anti-nuclear lobbies. Following the Fukushima nuclear disaster in March 2011, The Sydney Morning Herald named Mundine as a supporter of nuclear power.

Mundine wrote in an opinion piece published in The Australian Financial Review in 2012:

"By looking after the full life cycle of the uranium, with the support of the traditional owners of the lands on which it is mined and stored, not only will we play a responsible role within the global community, but we can ensure that Australian uranium is not sold to states seeking to produce weapons."

=== 2023 Indigenous Voice referendum ===
Mundine was a lead campaigner for the successful No vote in the 2023 Australian referendum on the Indigenous Voice to Parliament.

Recognise a Better Way was led by Mundine and included former Nationals deputy PM John Anderson, and former Keating government minister Gary Johns. The campaign, launched in January 2023, was set up by a group called the Voice No Case Committee. The committee included four Indigenous members: Mundine; Price (who later left the group); founder of the Kings Creek Station Ian Conway; and Bob Liddle, owner of Kemara enterprises.

Recognise a Better Way then merged into a new campaign, Australians for Unity, which Mundine co-founded with Jacinta Nampijinpa Price on 11 May 2023.

== Other roles ==
Mundine maintained his interest in Indigenous advocacy in his role with Andrew Forrest's Pilbara Mining Indigenous charity Generation One.

From 12 December 2017, Mundine co-hosted a 12-part program on Sky News Live, Mundine Means Business, focusing on successful Indigenous Australians in business. A second season debuted on 2 September 2018, supported by a grant totalling $220,000 from the Coalition government, running from 18 June 2018 to 1 August 2019, supporting 15 percent of the season's production expenses. Mundine received legal advice that the grant would not preclude him from being a candidate for the next federal election under Section 44 of the Constitution of Australia.

Other roles have included:

- Chair of the Australian Indigenous Education Foundation (as of June 2022)
- Co-founder (2008) and chair of the now apparently defunct Australian Indigenous Chamber of Commerce, later incorporating the Yaabubiin Institute for Disruptive Thinking
- Chairman of the board of Conservative Political Action Conference (CPAC) Australia, a conservative political group

== Recognition and honours ==
- 2005: Bennelong Medal for service to the Aboriginal community
- 2009: Honorary doctorate from Southern Cross University for his services to the community
- 2016: Officer of the Order of Australia

== Personal life ==
In 1975, Mundine married his first wife, Jenny Rose, with whom he has two children. After separating from Rose, Mundine gained custody of their two children.

In 1983, he met his second wife Lynette Riley, marrying her in 1984. They raised seven children: two from Mundine's first marriage, four of their own, and a foster child. They initially married at St Andrew's Congregational Church in Balmain, and in 2003 renewed their vows at St Brigid's Catholic Church in Dubbo. A devout Catholic, Mundine told The Catholic Weekly that he prayed every night. His marriage to Riley broke down during his presidency of the ALP, after he cheated on his wife more than once. Riley, a lecturer in Aboriginal education at Sydney University, remained largely silent about the disintegration of her marriage with Mundine but, in 2013 she gave a rare interview on the subject.

In October 2013, Mundine married for a third time, to corporate lawyer Elizabeth Henderson, describing it as the beginning of "a new life".

Political offices
Preceded by Barry Jones	National President of the Australian Labor Party; 2006–2007	Succeeded by John Faulkner
