= Respect (Joel Turner song) =

Single by Joel Turner and the Modern Day Poets

from the album Joel Turner and the Modern Day Poets
- Released: 17 October 2005
- Recorded: 2004
- Genre: Hip hop
- Length: 4:07
- Label: Dream Dealers
- Songwriter(s): Joel Turner; Tim Turner; Chris Turner; Mefi Puni; Brian Bouro
- Producer(s): Joel Turner; Craig Porteils

Joel Turner and the Modern Day Poets singles chronology
"Funk U Up" (2005)	"Respect" (2005)	"All Night Long" (2007)

"Respect" is the fourth single from Joel Turner and the Modern Day Poets' self-titled debut album. The verses are performed by the Modern Day Poets (MDP), with Turner contributing the chorus, bass and beatbox backing. A piano riff was supplied by Mefi Puni and Bryan Bouro.

The song is essentially a social comment on the lack of respect that exists within the hip hop community. It also alludes to the gang wars that have claimed the lives of several American rappers, and is a warning and a plea that the Australian hip hop scene does not follow suit.

On release, the single's video caused a slight controversy, as some people criticized the use of images of murdered rapper Tupac Shakur, which were interspersed with footage of Turner and MDP from previous video shoots and the 2005 West Coast Blues and Roots Festival. In addition, ABC video show Rage censored the lyric "When peeps knock on your door / And force you to the floor / Put a gun in your mouth / Blow your brains out all over the wall". Shortly after the video's release, a second clip for the song emerged in which most of the original content (including Shakur's likeness) was replaced with colour scenes of the group performing the tune for the camera.

"Respect" was released in Australia on 17 October 2005. It debuted in the top 40 of the ARIA singles chart, peaking at number 29 and reaching number 2 on the Queensland charts.

== Track listing ==
1. "Respect" (Radio Edit)
  Writers: J. Turner, T. Turner, C. Heiner, M. Puni, B. Bouro
  Producers: Joel Turner, Craig Porteils
2. "Respect" (Live Freo's West Coast Blues and Roots Festival)
  Writers: J. Turner, T. Turner, C. Heiner, M. Puni, B. Bouro
  Producers: Joel Turner, Craig Porteils, B. Bouro
3. "Respect" (Video)
4. DVD trailer

== Charts ==
Chart (2005)	Peak position
Australia (ARIA)	29
