= Australian Women Chamber of Commerce & Industry =

The Australian Women Chamber of Commerce and Industry (AWCCI) is Australia's only national business chamber for women. Its charter is to instigate research, promote trade and commerce, and advocate for gender equality in business. Through its membership AWCCI represents business owners in all States and Territories in Australia.

The AWCCI is a national not-for-profit, member based organisation which:

- considers all questions connected with trade and commerce;
- promotes, supports and/or opposes legislative or other measures affecting such trade and commerce;
- collects and circulates statistics and other information relating to such trade and commerce.

AWCCI was launched on 8 March 2011 to coincide with International Women's Day.

== CEO ==
Yolanda Vega is the chief executive officer at the AWCCI. Vega sits on the Australian Government's Small Business Advisory Committee Board (SBAC).

== 2011 APEC Women’s Economic Summit ==
Yolanda Vega was part of the delegation to represent Australia at the first Women's Economic Summit under the chairmanship of US Secretary of State Hillary Clinton in September 2011. Vega was invited by the Australian Federal Government to be part of the Policy Partnership on Women and the Economy (PPWE) which worked on the Declaration signed by 21 economies.

The Declaration states that Asia-Pacific Economic Cooperation economies will take concrete actions to realise the full potential of women, integrate them more fully into the economy, harness their talents, remove barriers that restrict women's full economic participation, and maximize their contributions towards economic growth.

== Activities ==
=== National Research Project ===
In October 2011, the AWCCI launched an online national research project to collect data about women business owners in Australia. Ita Buttrose was involved in driving women to the poll.

The report findings state that half of the respondents started their business in or since 2007. 71% of respondents are running their first business, and 29% are running a subsequent business and many started their venture with less than A$5,000 capital.

With the new, the AWCCI advocates for programmes and policies to provide women business owners and female entrepreneurs the opportunity to contribution to economic growth. This ground-breaking piece of research challenges assumptions about industry and business.

== Policy ==
The AWCCI advocates gender equity policies that provide women business owners with access to capital and markets as well as the opportunities to procure contracts at all levels of industry and government.

== Mission ==
To provide women business owners and female entrepreneurs with a voice: the AWCCI influences policy and programs to make women more independent and their business profitable.

== See also ==
- Economy of Australia
