= These Kids =

2004 single by Joel Turner and the Modern Day Poets

Single by Joel Turner and the Modern Day Poets

from the album Joel Turner and the Modern Day Poets
- Released: 27 September 2004
- Length: 3:58
- Label: Dream Dealers
- Songwriter(s): Joel Turner; Tim Turner
- Producer(s): Joel Turner; Steve Scanlon

Joel Turner and the Modern Day Poets singles chronology
"These Kids" (2004)	"Knock U Out" (2005)

"These Kids" is a song by Australian beatboxer Joel Turner and Australian hip hop duo the Modern Day Poets. It was independently released as the lead single from their self-titled debut album on 27 September 2004. The song was written in December 2001, with the music composed by Turner and the lyrics written by his older brother Tim (also known as DubLT).

"These Kids" reached number one on the ARIA Singles Chart, and was certified platinum by the Australian Recording Industry Association (ARIA). The track was nominated at the 2005 ARIA Music Awards and 2006 APRA Music Awards.

== Writing and inspiration ==
DubLT is quoted as saying, "I wrote These Kids after one of my mates committed suicide, so it means a lot to me that it connected with so many people" ...

"I never wrote that song thinking it would be recorded or that Joel would get famous. But there is a reason I wrote that song and there’s a reason why Joel got famous. It was so I could bring out that song and someone could see the light."

— Tim Turner

In more recent times, the track has also been dedicated to Joel Turner's troubled childhood neighbour and friend. Much of the song's popularity is thought to be due to the reality of its subject matter. It aims to draw attention to the plight of street kids:

"Nobody knows the suffering they go through
And you wouldn’t believe 'em if they told you"

The song offers a message of hope to young people going through hard times while also criticizing the justice system:

"Instead of listening to the kids with the problems, they just tick them off more
Until the kid’s in prison or he’s dead before he’s 24"

Other issues covered in the song include crime, drugs and depression, with further references to the suicide of DubLT's friend and the 2001 murder of a 14-year-old Brisbane boy stabbed to death by a family friend who had promised to help him buy marijuana.

== Recording and mixing ==
Turner travelled to Cairns in far north Queensland at the age of 15 to record the track with producer David Lynch for M.E.L. Productions. Once there, he laid down the vocals, beat and guitars while DubLT recorded his rap verse on a $20 microphone back in Brisbane. Turner has said that he originally tried using a real beat for the song, but subsequently chose to replace it with beatboxing.

When Australian Idol judge Mark Holden heard the recording some time later, he decided to release a remixed version as Turner's first single, which featured the addition of strings and an alternative rap from DubLT. Although the song was edited to four minutes for radio, the full version can be found on the CD single and album, featuring a longer intro, additional choruses and extended electric guitar work. The original M.E.L. mix is also present on the CD single.

== Reception and accolades ==
The song debuted at number five on the Australian Singles Chart on 10 October 2004. It topped the chart in its ninth week, and remained on the chart for twenty-one consecutive weeks. It was certified platinum by the Australian Recording Industry Association (ARIA) for shipments of 70,000 units. Its U-turn is thought to have been helped by Turner's appearance at the 2004 Australian Idol Grand Final, as well as the song's use in promoting Network Ten television show Summerland.

The single was nominated for Breakthrough Artist at the 2005 ARIA Music Awards and for Most Performed Urban Work at the 2006 APRA Music Awards.

== Music video ==
The video for the song, shot by director Amiel Courtin-Wilson, was filmed in Melbourne, although Turner and his group had originally wanted to shoot it in their hometown of Brisbane. During an interview with Brisbane's Courier Mail in 2007, Turner recalled shooting the video with a bright light shining in his eyes, which led to his squinting throughout the clip.

Alongside footage of Turner performing the track in a home studio, the video features scenes of a teenage couple sleeping outside a train station and begging on the street to passers-by. At one point, the couple is seen holding up a sign that reads "HOMELESS & HUNGRY…PLEASE HELP". Courtin-Wilson has said that many of the people walking past (none of whom were actors) thought that the young pair were genuinely in need, and numerous donations of money had to be turned away.

== Live performances and remix ==
A remixed version of the track appears as a bonus track on Turner's second album Out of the Box, featuring a substitute verse by rapper Pos of De La Soul.

== Track listing ==
No.	Title	Writer(s)	Producer(s)	Length
1.	"These Kids" (radio edit)	Joel Turner; Tim Turner	Joel Turner; Steve Scanlon	4:01
2.	"These Kids" (Scanmix)	Joel Turner; Tim Turner	Joel Turner; Steve Scanlon	5:45
3.	"These Kids" (M.E.L. Mix)	Joel Turner; Tim Turner	David Lynch; Mick Evans	4:45
4.	"These Kids" (instrumental)			4:01
5.	"JT Freestyle" (Beatbox track)			1:35
6.	"Beethoven Beats" (Beatbox track)			0:53
7.	"Bass Guitar" (Beatbox track)			0:41

== Charts ==
=== Weekly charts ===
Chart (2004)	Peak position
Australia (ARIA)	1

=== Year-end charts ===
Chart (2004)	Position
Australia (ARIA)	8
Australian Artist (ARIA)	3

=== Decade-end charts ===
Chart (2000–2009)	Position
Australia (ARIA)	47

== Certification ==
Region	Certification	Certified units/sales
Australia (ARIA)	Platinum	70,000^{^}
^{^} Shipments figures based on certification alone.
