= Knock U Out =

Single by Joel Turner and the Modern Day Poets featuring Anthony Mundine

from the album Joel Turner and the Modern Day Poets
- B-side: "The Beatbox Symphony"
- Released: 24 January 2005
- Recorded: 2004
- Genre: Rap rock
- Length: 3:34
- Label: Dream Dealers
- Songwriters: Tim Turner; Joel Turner; Chris Turner; Jim Peterik; Frank Sullivan III
- Producers: Joel Turner; Craig Porteils

Joel Turner and the Modern Day Poets featuring Anthony Mundine singles chronology
"These Kids" (2004)	"Knock U Out" (2005)	"Funk U Up" (2005)

Anthony Mundine singles chronology
"Like a Dog" (2001)	"Knock U Out" (2005)	"Platinum Ryder" (2007)

"Knock U Out" is the second single from Joel Turner and the Modern Day Poets' self-titled album Joel Turner and the Modern Day Poets. It features a guest appearance by boxer Anthony Mundine.

The song incorporates elements from the 1982 Survivor hit "Eye of the Tiger" in keeping with a boxing theme. The chorus and first verse are performed by DubLT, the second verse by Mundine, and the third by C4. Beatboxer Turner provides the beat and also replicates the "Eye of the Tiger" riff using both his voice and guitar. Survivor co-founder and "Eye of the Tiger" co-writer Jim Peterik described the adaptation as "one of the very few versions that i approve. It has the spirit intact."

The lyrical basis of the song is the Modern Day Poets' portrayal as a musical force to be reckoned with, while Mundine's verse is a shot at his critics and a vow to regain the WBA Super Middleweight title he had previously lost. The music video, filmed at a boxing gym in Melbourne, features the group performing the track in a boxing ring with several female dancers in the background. Other scenes show Turner training with Mundine, with some exterior shots also included.

Mundine’s involvement in the song transpired after he competed with Turner's manager Mark Holden at a celebrity Grand Prix race in early 2004. Holden played the boxer a demo of the young artists and asked if he would be interested in recording with them. After Mundine agreed, the group was immediately required to write a song that would be suitable for him to rap on.

"Knock U Out" was released on 24 January 2005, reaching number 14 on the ARIA Singles Chart and number 1 on the independent chart.

== Track listing ==
1. "Knock U Out"
  Writers: T. Turner, J. Turner, C. Turner, J. Peterik, F. Sullivan III
  Producers: Joel Turner, Craig Porteils
2. "The Beatbox Symphony"
  Writers: J. Turner, K. Burtland, J. MacAvoy
  Producer: Joel Turner
3. "These Kids" (Video)

== Charts ==
Chart (2005)	Peak position
Australia (ARIA)	14
Australian Urban (ARIA)	6
