= Tony Mundine =

Australian boxer (1951–2026)

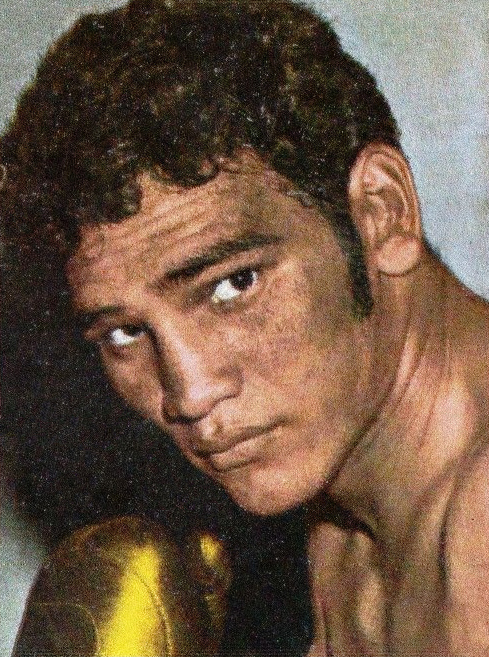

Personal information
- Nationality: Australian
- Born: Anthony William Mundine; 10 June 1951 Baryulgil, New South Wales, Australia
- Died: 30 August 2026 (aged 75)
- Height: 5' 11½ (182 cm)
- Weight: Heavyweight; Cruiserweight; Light heavyweight Middleweight

Boxing career
- Stance: Orthodox

Boxing record
- Total fights: 96
- Wins: 80
- Win by KO: 64
- Losses: 15
- Draws: 1

Anthony William Mundine (10 June 1951 – 30 August 2026) was an Australian boxer and one of the country's most accomplished Indigenous fighters. He was the only Australian boxer to compete professionally in four weight divisions and held the Australian middleweight, light heavyweight, cruiserweight and heavyweight titles, as well as the Commonwealth middleweight and light heavyweight titles. He also challenged once for the World Boxing Association (WBA) world middleweight title in 1974.

Coming from a boxing family, he was the father of former world champion boxer Anthony Mundine, the grandfather of Rahim Mundine and cousin of Warren Mundine.

== Early life ==
Mundine was born in Baryulgil, New South Wales on 10 June 1951.

== Rugby league ==
Mundine played centre three-quarter for a Grafton Rugby league team. He showed promise and was offered a place with the Redfern All Blacks in the South Sydney Junior Rugby League in 1968 at age 17. Rather than return to Baryulgil to work at the asbestos mine between seasons, he kept fit at Ern McQuillan's gym in Newtown, Sydney, where he showed natural ability and speed. McQuillan engaged him in a fighter-trainer contract.

== Boxing ==
Mundine was the only Australian boxer to compete professionally in four weight divisions. He held the Australian middleweight, light heavyweight, cruiserweight and heavyweight titles, as well as the Commonwealth middleweight and light heavyweight titles.

Mundine won his first match on 5 March 1969 against Frank Graham. In his fifth professional bout, at the Manly Leagues club in May 1969, Ray Wheatley dropped Mundine in their scheduled ten round contest in round one to become the only Australian to have Mundine on the canvas. Mundine stopped Wheatley in round two. In less than a year he won his first title, the Australian Middleweight crown.

Mundine's last bout was against Alex Sua on 19 March 1984.

His titles were:

- Australian Middleweight title, 23 April 1970 against Billy Choules
- Australian Heavyweight title, 25 February 1972 against Foster Bibron
- Commonwealth Middleweight title, 14 April 1972 against Bunny Sterling
- Australian and Commonwealth Light Heavyweight titles, 30 October 1975 against Steve Aczel
- Australian Cruiserweight title, 24 July 1981 against Steve Aczel.

Mundine challenged Carlos Monzón on 5 October 1974 for the WBA World Middleweight title but lost by a knockout in the 7th round. He was undefeated by any Australian boxer during his 16-year career. He fought many top boxers including Emile Griffith, Monty Betham, Steve Aczel, Bennie Briscoe and Alex Sua.

== Personal life and death ==
Mundine was the father of former world champion boxer Anthony Mundine, and a cousin of Warren Mundine.

His older brother Mickey Mundine played in the first Australian Aboriginal rugby league team in 1973.

He lived in Redfern, Sydney, from the 1980s when he founded and managed a training gym called Elouera Tony Mundine Gym.

Tony Mundine died on 30 August 2026, at the age of 75, after suffering a heart attack.

== Awards and honours ==
On 26 January 1986, Mundine was awarded the Medal of the Order of Australia for "service to sport particularly to boxing and to Aboriginal youth".

Mundine was the winner of the Ella Award for Lifetime Achievement in Aboriginal and Torres Strait Islander Sport at the Deadly Awards in 2004.

He was the 2005 inductee in the Australian National Boxing Hall of Fame Moderns category.

In 2026, awarded Lifetime Achievement Award at National Aboriginal and Torres Strait Islander Sports Awards.

== Professional boxing record ==
80 Wins (64 knockouts, 16 decisions), 15 Losses (10 knockouts, 5 decisions), 1 Draw
Result	Record	Opponent	Type	Round	Date	Location	Notes
Loss	21–3	Alex Sua	PTS	12	19 March 1984	Auckland, New Zealand	Australasian Light Heavyweight Title. 233–234, 232–234, 228–234.
Loss	15–6–2	Rufino Angulo	KO	5	13 June 1983	Paris, France	
Win	13–3–1	Dragomir Milo Popovic	TKO	6	6 November 1982	Noumea, New Caledonia	
Loss	34–8	Murray Sutherland	UD	10	6 September 1982	Brisbane, Queensland, Australia	90–99, 94–99, 93–100.
Win	24–1–1	Mustafa Wasajja	PTS	10	11 June 1982	Marseille, Bouches-du-Rhône, France	
Win	29–1–1	Hocine Tafer	KO	2	8 May 1982	Grenoble, Isère, France	
Loss	53–12	Yaqui Lopez	TKO	3	27 November 1981	Gold Coast, Queensland, Australia	
Win	27–4–1	Steve Aczel	TKO	6	24 July 1981	Brisbane, Queensland, Australia	Australian Light Heavyweight/Cruiserweight/Heavyweight Titles.
Win	54–15–1	Bunny Johnson	TKO	10	20 May 1981	Gold Coast, Queensland, Australia	Referee stopped the bout at 2:43 of the tenth round.
Loss	21–13–2	Jesse Burnett	PTS	12	4 March 1981	Auckland, New Zealand	
Win	38–9	Monty Betham	KO	5	15 December 1980	Auckland, New Zealand	Australasian Light Heavyweight Title.
Win	1–1	Joe Fabiano	KO	6	20 September 1980	Noumea, New Caledonia	
Win	23–3–1	Steve Aczel	TKO	9	28 July 1980	Brisbane, Queensland, Australia	Australian Heavyweight Title.
Win	10–21–5	David "The King" Smith	UD	10	30 May 1980	Pirae, French Polynesia	98–94, 97–90, 100–97.
Win	9–5–1	David Conteh	PTS	10	18 April 1980	Bologna, Emilia Romagna, Italy	
Win	17–3	Pat Cuillo	DQ	5	4 April 1980	Milan, Lombardia, Italy	
Win	17–6	Johnny Wilburn	PTS	8	14 December 1979	Milan, Lombardia, Italy	
Win	30–5–3	Ennio Cometti	TKO	9	30 November 1979	Trieste, Friuli-Venezia Giulia, Italy	
Loss	23–2–1	Mate Parlov	PTS	12	26 September 1979	Gorizia, Friuli-Venezia Giulia, Italy	WBC World Cruiserweight Title Eliminator.
Win	10–9–1	Pete McIntyre	TKO	5	3 August 1979	Sydney, Australia	
Win	17–8–3	Tony "Lime" Greene	KO	4	20 April 1979	Melbourne, Australia	
Win	12–6–1	Marc Ecimovic	TKO	2	31 March 1979	Melbourne, Australia	Australia Heavyweight Title.
Win	0–1	Ananai Curebera	TKO	2	18 February 1979	Sydney, Australia	Referee stopped the bout at 1:03 of the second round.
Win	67–32–7	Ron "Mr." Wilson	TKO	7	9 February 1979	Brisbane, Queensland, Australia	
Win	10–2	Karl Canwell	TKO	3	24 November 1978	Brisbane, Queensland, Australia	
Win	11–3	Fossie Schmidt	KO	1	15 July 1978	Suva, Fiji	
Loss	29–13–3	Gary Summerhays	KO	11	27 February 1978	Melbourne, Australia	Commonwealth Light Heavyweight Title.
Win	13–2	Andros Ernie Barr	PTS	10	24 January 1978	Melbourne, Australia	
Win	9–6	Maile Haumona	KO	3	5 December 1977	Melbourne, Australia	Australia Heavyweight Title.
Win	13–10–1	Danny Brewer	KO	7	21 October 1977	Brisbane, Queensland, Australia	
Win	11–9–1	Dave Lee Royster	PTS	10	9 September 1977	Brisbane, Queensland, Australia	49–45.
Loss	10–9–1	Dave Lee Royster	KO	1	28 July 1977	Port Moresby, Papua New Guinea	
Win	12–1	Andros Ernie Barr	PTS	15	8 July 1977	Brisbane, Queensland, Australia	Commonwealth Light Heavyweight Title.
Win	8–5	Maile Haumona	TKO	10	2 June 1977	Port Moresby, Papua New Guinea	
Win	8–6–2	Victor Attivor	TKO	9	4 September 1976	Accra, Ghana	Commonwealth Light Heavyweight Title.
Win	7–4	Maile Haumona	PTS	10	11 August 1976	Sydney, Australia	
Loss	11–3–1	Jesse Burnett	KO	6	14 May 1976	Brisbane, Queensland, Australia	Mundine knocked out at 1:06 of the sixth round.
Win	34–14–2	Baby Boy Rolle	KO	3	26 March 1976	Brisbane, Queensland, Australia	Commonwealth Light Heavyweight Title.
Win	38–23–4	Karl Zurheide	KO	1	19 March 1976	Sydney, Australia	Karl knocked out at 1:25 of the first round.
Win	7–4–1	Victor Attivor	TKO	2	4 December 1975	Sydney, Australia	Commonwealth Light Heavyweight Title. Referee stopped the bout at 2:16 of the second round.
Win	14–1	Steve Aczel	KO	12	30 October 1975	Sydney, Australia	Commonwealth/Australian Light Heavyweight Title.
Win	14–3–2	"Shoeless" Joe Jackson	PTS	10	4 September 1975	Sydney, Australia	
Loss	9–3–1	"Sweet" James Marshall	KO	1	2 May 1975	Brisbane, Queensland, Australia	Mundine knocked out at 2:58 of the first round.
Loss	28–2	Rudy Robles	PTS	10	28 February 1975	Brisbane, Queensland, Australia	46–47.
Loss	82–3–9	Carlos Monzon	KO	7	5 October 1974	Buenos Aires, Argentina	WBA World Middleweight Title.
Win	24–16	Nate "Nat" Collins	TKO	5	9 August 1974	Brisbane, Queensland, Australia	
Win	14–2	Lenny Harden	KO	3	27 May 1974	Paris, France	
Win	23–12–1	Don Cobbs	TKO	6	10 May 1974	Brisbane, Queensland, Australia	
Loss	48–12–1	Bennie Briscoe	KO	5	25 February 1974	Paris, France	
Win	25–5–1	Manuel Fierro	KO	6	11 February 1974	Brisbane, Queensland, Australia	
Win	77–14–1	Emile Griffith	UD	12	19 November 1973	Paris, France	
Win	23–19–1	Carlos Marks	PTS	15	28 September 1973	Brisbane, Queensland, Australia	Commonwealth Middleweight Title.
Win	19–10–2	Fred Etuati	KO	1	20 August 1973	Auckland, New Zealand	Commonwealth Middleweight Title. Fred knocked out at 1:44 of the first round.
Win	23–18–1	Carlos Marks	KO	10	3 August 1973	Brisbane, Queensland, Australia	Commonwealth Middleweight Title.
Win	31–7–8	Nessim Max Cohen	TKO	4	14 May 1973	Paris, France	Referee stopped the bout at 0:42 of the fourth round.
Win	20–20–5	Luis Vinales	TKO	2	1 May 1973	Brisbane, Queensland, Australia	
Win	18–10–2	Matt "Art" Donovan	KO	3	7 February 1973	Sydney, Australia	Commonwealth Middleweight Title.
Win	25–11–2	Lonnie Harris	TKO	5	8 December 1972	Brisbane, Queensland, Australia	
Win	13–7–1	Roy "General" Lee	KO	2	4 November 1972	Noumea, New Caledonia	
Win	69–9–7	"San" Antonio Aguilar	TKO	3	26 September 1972	Sydney, Australia	
Win	40–13–5	Juarez de Lima	TKO	5	21 August 1972	Brisbane, Queensland, Australia	Referee stopped the bout at 1:12 of the fifth round.
Win	83–23–4	Denny Moyer	TKO	7	31 May 1972	Sydney, Australia	
Win	24–10–3	Bunny Sterling	KO	15	14 April 1972	Brisbane, Queensland, Australia	Commonwealth Middleweight Title.
Win	27–12–1	Foster Bibron	TKO	11	25 February 1972	Brisbane, Queensland, Australia	Australian Heavyweight Title.
Win	19–8	George "Hurricane" Carter	TKO	2	17 February 1972	Sydney, Australia	
Win	38–40–7	Charley "Bad News" Austin	TKO	2	10 December 1971	Brisbane, Queensland, Australia	
Win	11–4	Eric Blake	TKO	3	26 November 1971	Brisbane, Queensland, Australia	
Win	17–9–1	Tommy "Gun" Gray	TKO	7	22 October 1971	Brisbane, Queensland, Australia	Referee stopped the bout at 0:55 of the seventh round.
Win	17–9–2	Rod Kenny	TKO	4	23 September 1971	Sydney, Australia	
Win	10–4–2	Jackson McQuade	KO	1	5 September 1971	Brisbane, Queensland, Australia	
Win	3–0–1	Al Korovou	KO	5	1 July 1971	Sydney, Australia	
Loss	104–9	Luis Manuel Rodriguez	KO	1	7 April 1971	Melbourne, Australia	Mundine knocked out at 0:52 of the first round.
Win	3–2	Victor Manuel Basilio	TKO	2	18 February 1971	Sydney, Australia	
Draw	19–9–2	Bunny Sterling	PTS	15	21 January 1971	Sydney, Australia	Commonwealth Middleweight Title.
Win	24–14–4	Barry Calderwood	TKO	5	12 December 1970	Melbourne, Australia	
Win	39–25–3	Johnny Kramer	TKO	5	25 August 1970	Sydney, Australia	
Win	51–64–14	Billy "Mellow" Marsh	TKO	8	16 July 1970	Sydney, Australia	
Win	9–15–2	Filipino Ravalo	KO	2	9 June 1970	Sydney, Australia	
Win	3–6	Ravuama Roko	KO	2	28 May 1970	Sydney, Australia	
Win	12–8–2	Billy Choules	KO	4	23 April 1970	Sydney, Australia	Australia Middleweight Title.
Win	--	Jeke Naqelevuki	TKO	3	19 March 1970	Sydney, Australia	
Win	1–3–1	Sione Sani	KO	1	10 March 1970	Sydney, Australia	
Win	12–7–2	Billy Choules	KO	4	9 February 1970	Melbourne, Australia	
Win	17–8	Billy Opetaia	TKO	7	17 December 1969	Sydney, Australia	Referee stopped the bout at 1:04 of the seventh round.
Win	--	Feleti Leone	TKO	2	12 December 1969	Melbourne, Australia	
Loss	14–5	Kahu Mahanga	KO	9	10 November 1969	Melbourne, Australia	
Win	4–6–2	Les "Jazzer" Dixon	KO	2	22 October 1969	Sydney, Australia	
Win	6–5	Lee Moto	KO	5	23 September 1969	Sydney, Australia	
Win	1–2–1	Sione Sani	PTS	8	8 September 1969	Melbourne, Australia	
Win	3–4	Ted McKenzie	KO	3	28 July 1969	Sydney, Australia	
Win	7–3–1	Ricky Datsun	PTS	8	23 June 1969	Melbourne, Australia	
Win	1–1	"Sugar" Ray Wheatley	KO	2	28 May 1969	Sydney, Australia	
Win	2–2	Ted McKenzie	KO	5	7 May 1969	Sydney, Australia	
Win	2–1	Ted McKenzie	PTS	10	16 April 1969	Sydney, Australia	
Win	0–2	Frank "Evangelist" Graham	KO	3	9 April 1969	Sydney, Australia	
Win	--	Frank "Evangelist" Graham	PTS	4	5 March 1969	Sydney, Australia	

Awards and achievements
Preceded by Billy Choules	Australian Middleweight Champion; 23 April 1970 – 25 June 1975; Vacated	Vacant Title next held by Semi Bula
Preceded by Foster Bibron	Australian Heavyweight Champion; 25 February 1972 – 26 June 1975; Vacated	Vacant Title next held by Steve Aczel; Vacated
Preceded by Bunny Sterling	Commonwealth Middleweight Champion; 14 April 1972 – 24 July 1975; Vacated	Vacant Title next held by Monty Betham
Preceded by Steve Aczel	Commonwealth Light Heavyweight Champion; 30 October 1975 – 27 February 1978	Succeeded by Gary Summerhays
Vacant Title last held by Steve Aczel	Australian Light Heavyweight Champion; 30 October 1975 – 27 April 1984; Vacated	Vacant Title next held by Wally Carr
Preceded by Maile Haumona	Australian Heavyweight Champion; 5 December 1977 – 14 July 1981; Vacated	Vacant Title next held by Steve Aczel
Vacant Title last held by None	Australian Cruiserweight Champion; 24 July 1981 – 1 June 1984; Vacated	Vacant Title next held by Kevin Wagstaff
