= Anthony Mundine =

Australian boxer, rugby league footballer, and rapper (born 1975)

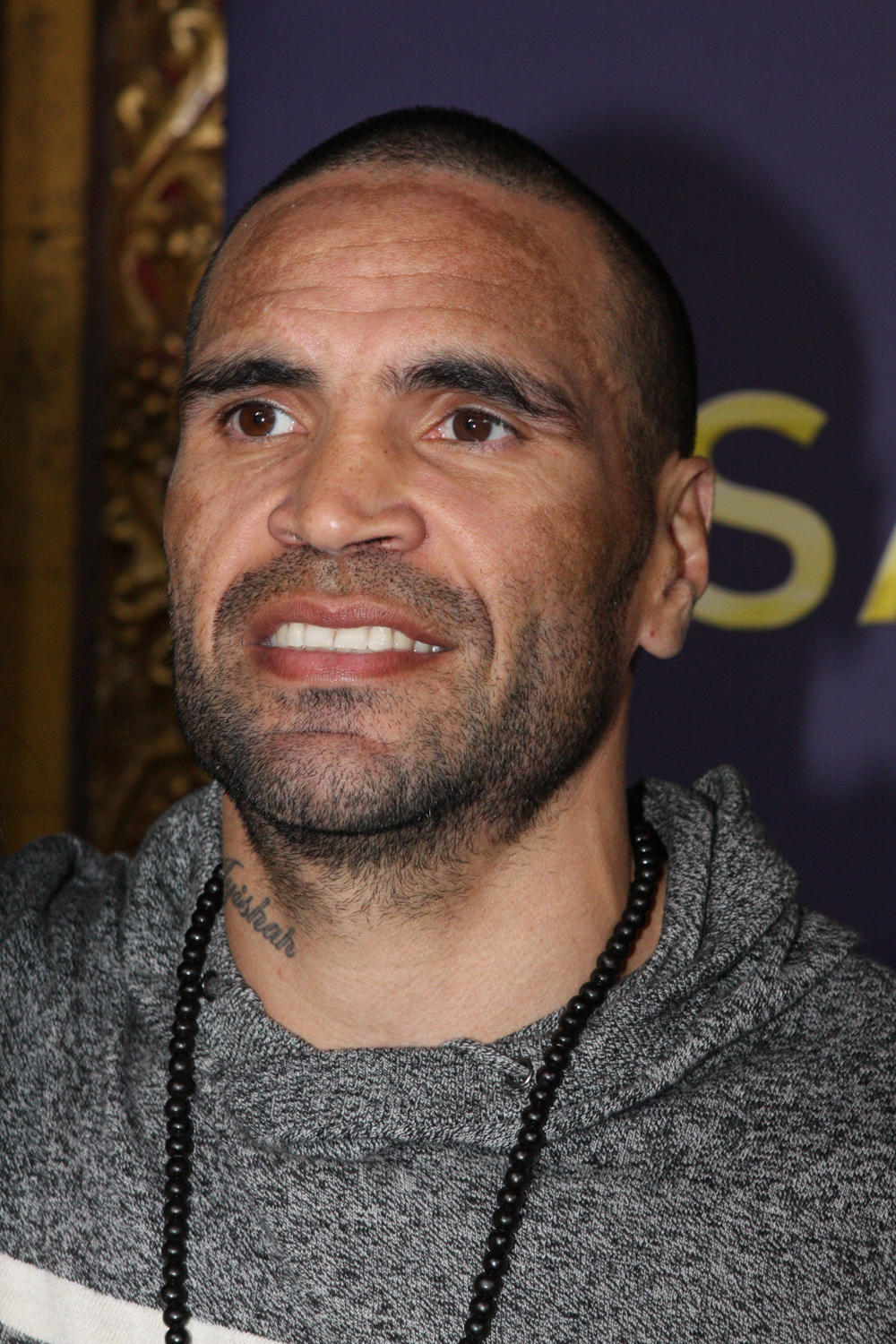
- Mundine in 2012

Personal information
- Nicknames: The Man; Choc
- Born: Anthony Steven Mundine; 21 May 1975 (age 51) Sydney, New South Wales, Australia
- Height: 1.80 m (5 ft 11 in)
- Weight: Light-middleweight; Middleweight; Super-middleweight; Cruiserweight
- Rugby league career

Playing information
- Weight: 87 kg (192 lb; 13 st 10 lb)
- Position: Five-eighth, Centre
Club
Years	Team	Pld	T	G	FG	P
1993–96	St. George Dragons	60	30	3	1	127
1997	Brisbane Broncos	18	3	0	0	12
1998	St. George Dragons	23	7	0	1	29
1999–00	St. George Illawarra	33	19	0	0	76
	Total	134	59	3	2	244
Representative
Years	Team	Pld	T	G	FG	P
1996	NSW City Origin	1	0	0	0	0
1999	New South Wales	3	1	0	0	4
- Education: Canterbury Boys' High School; Cleveland Street High School
- Father: Tony Mundine
- Relatives: Amos Roberts (uncle); James Roberts (cousin); Beau Mundine (cousin); Wes Patten (cousin); Tyran Smith (brother-in-law); Robbie Simpson (cousin); Rod Silva (uncle); Buddy Gordon (cousin)

Boxing career
- Reach: 178 cm (70 in)
- Stance: Orthodox

Boxing record
- Total fights: 59
- Wins: 48
- Win by KO: 28
- Losses: 11

Anthony Steven Mundine (born 21 May 1975) is an Australian former professional boxer and rugby league footballer. In boxing he competed from 2000 to 2021, and held the World Boxing Association (WBA) super-middleweight title twice between 2003 and 2008. He also held the International Boxing Organization (IBO) middleweight title from 2009 to 2010, and the WBA interim super-welterweight title from 2011 to 2012. Mundine is well known for his heated rivalries with fellow Australians Danny Green and Daniel Geale.

== Early life and education ==
Anthony Steven Mundine is the son of former professional boxer Tony Mundine and hails from the Bundjalung people of northern coastal areas of New South Wales. Both of his parents are Aboriginal. He was raised as a Christian but converted to Islam in the late 1990s.

Mundine played junior rugby league for Hurstville United and, while attending Kingsgrove High School, Mundine starred for the school in the 1993 and 1994 teams which won the University Shield both of those years. He also played for the Australian Schoolboys team in 1993. That year, Mundine signed with the St. George Dragons as an eighteen-year-old. Mundine also attended Canterbury Boys' High School and Cleveland Street High School.

== Rugby league ==
In 1994, Mundine represented the Junior Kangaroos, the team that beat Great Britain's under-19s in the curtain-raiser to the Australia v. France Test at Parramatta Stadium.

In 1996, he played in a losing grand final, against the Manly-Warringah Sea Eagles. That year, he was the victim of racial vilification when Rugby League player Barry Ward called Mundine a "black c- - - -". Ward was fined $10,000 for the offence. At the end of that season Mundine announced that he was signing with the Brisbane Broncos in the Super League competition.

In 1997, he played 18 games for the Brisbane club, scoring three tries. He also played at centre in his second consecutive grand final, this time a victory against the Cronulla-Sutherland Sharks in Brisbane.

In 1998, he returned to St. George.

Mundine was selected to play for New South Wales in each of the three matches of the 1999 State of Origin series, scoring a try in Game I on debut.

That year he also assisted St. George Illawarra's run to the Grand Final, with a hat-trick against the Cronulla-Sutherland Sharks in the major semi-final. The following week the club lost to the Melbourne Storm in the 1999 NRL Grand Final during which and Mundine, playing at five-eighth knocked-on over the try line early in the second half when the score was 14–0 in favour of St. George Illawarra, which proved to be a major turning point in the match.

The following year, Mundine said before the club's grand final rematch with Melbourne that Melbourne were not worthy premiers. Melbourne would hand St. George Illawarra a 70–10 defeat at the Melbourne Cricket Ground.

Mundine was disappointed that further representative honours did not follow, and believed that his representative opportunities did not reflect his abilities and achievements at club level. He raised the issue of racism as the main explanation for this.

Mundine left rugby league halfway through the 2000 season, after being inspired to go into boxing, when a friend, Abdi Osman, showed him a video of Muhammad Ali. He later cited what he claimed was racism concerning rugby league as one of the reasons he quit to take up boxing. Mundine would later make implications during a promotion for a boxing match that former chairman of selectors and respected Aboriginal figure Arthur Beetson may have been an "Uncle Tom" who went along with the alleged racism.

In 2005, Mundine was reported to be making a comeback to the NRL, but this did not eventuate.

In 2007, Mundine was appointed Indigenous Liaison Officer at the South Sydney Rabbitohs.

Mundine has close family ties to rugby league: he is a relative of Wes Patten, Amos Roberts, Beau Mundine, Blake Ferguson and Reece Robinson, all NRL footballers. He is also the brother-in-law of Tyran Smith who married Mundine's sister, Kellie. Mundine's son CJ Mundine is currently on the path to playing in the NRL.

In September 2016, after stating on previous occasions he wanted to return to rugby league, Mundine claimed that St George chief executive Peter Doust had been in contact with him regarding his availability to play. On 8 December 2017, Mundine again declared that he desired to return to rugby league and singled out St George as the club for which he wanted to play. Mundine said in an interview with Fox Sports regarding his possible return that "It could be possible, you don't know. Anything is possible with me,".

On 21 April 2019, it was announced that Mundine would make a return to rugby league and had signed with the Matraville Tigers in the South Sydney District Rugby League.

== Boxing career ==
Mundine was trained by his father, Tony Mundine, who was a middleweight contender during the 1970s.

Mundine fought his first professional boxing match in July 2000, at the age of 25. After a limited amateur career (he had 4 amateur fights when he was 17), his first professional fight was against New Zealander Gerrard Zohs. Only 10 professional bouts later Mundine fought for his first world title against long reigning IBF supermiddleweight champion Sven Ottke in January 2001.

=== Mundine vs. Sven Ottke ===
In 2001, Anthony Mundine took on then Super Middleweight champion Sven Ottke for the IBF Super Middleweight belt, Mundine was ahead on points before being knocked out by a right hand to the temple in the 10th round. This was the first time Mundine lost.

=== Mundine vs. Antwun Echols ===
Since the WBA and IBF super middleweight titles had been unified by Sven Ottke, Ottke was upgraded to "super" champion status by the WBA and the WBA "regular" super middleweight title was declared vacant (see undisputed champion). Mundine went on to claim the vacant WBA Super Middleweight title with a unanimous points decision over Antwun Echols on 3 September 2003, in front of his home crowd at the Sydney Entertainment Centre.

=== Mundine vs. Manny Siaca ===
After gaining the vacant WBA title and defending the title once, Mundine fought against Manny Siaca, In a hesitant performance Mundine lost in a 12-round split points decision.

=== Mundine vs. Mikkel Kessler ===
Mundine failed in his attempt to win the WBA super middleweight title after losing by decision to Mikkel Kessler on 6 August 2005 at the Sydney Entertainment Centre.

=== Mundine vs. Danny Green ===
Mundine's biggest Australian rivalry is with Perth-based Danny Green. In 2001, Mundine called Danny Green "a bum" in response to Green using Mundine's name to garner media attention, and stated that Danny would be a "no hoper" against him. Green waged a consistent media war with Mundine, using the media to build up his own name, and interest in a potential fight with Mundine. The two boxers finally, after much anticipation, fought on 17 May 2006, at Sydney Football Stadium, Sydney. The bout was one of the most anticipated in Australian boxing history, and was thought to eclipse the attendance record of 37,000 when Jeff Fenech fought Azumah Nelson in their rematch in 1992. The fight was broadcast on Main Event helmed by Michael Schiavello. It was the biggest Pay Per View event in Australian television history. Green became the slight favourite about 2 hours before the bout. Green had little answer to Mundine's speed and jab, giving Mundine the upper hand. Mundine won a twelve-round unanimous decision by the following scores: Judge Michael Lee 116–113, Judge Pinij Prayadsub 118–111, Judge Derek Milham 118–112.

=== Mundine vs. Sam Soliman II ===
Soliman and Mundine would meet for a second time, this time competing for the vacant WBA "regular" super middleweight championship of the world. Unlike the first fight, Mundine dominated the proceedings, knocking his opponent down once in the second round, and three times in the ninth, prompting a knockout ruling by the referee.

=== Mundine vs. Daniel Geale ===
On 27 May 2009, Mundine faced then-undefeated International Boxing Organization middleweight champion Daniel Geale (21–0–0). Mundine won by split decision with two judges scoring it 116–113 and 114–113 in favour of Mundine, the third judge scoring 115–113 for Geale. After the fight, Mundine admitted that he had barely studied Geale prior to the fight. The fight undercard also marked the debut of Mundine's close friend and league-turned-rugby player Sonny Bill Williams.

=== Mundine vs. Garth Wood ===
On 8 December 2010, Mundine took on the winner of The Contender Australia boxing series, Garth Wood. After an awkward first four rounds, consisting of grappling, Mundine was on his way to a wide decision (being ahead 4–0 on the cards). Mundine was knocked out in the 5th round by Wood. Wood was able to land a flush left hook on Mundine's chin, sending him to the canvas. The result was reported to be one of the biggest upsets in Australian boxing history.

=== Mundine vs. Garth Wood II ===
On 13 April 2011, Mundine gained revenge for his loss when he defeated Wood in a rematch won every round and dropped him twice and won, via a 10-round unanimous points decision.

=== Mundine vs. Rigoberto Alvarez ===
On 19 October 2011, Mundine faced former WBA champion Rigoberto Alvarez for the interim WBA Light Middleweight world title. Mundine won by unanimous decision and as a result became the mandatory challenger for the full belt holder Austin Trout.

=== Mundine stripped of title ===
Trout was previously in negotiations with Mundine, but when Trout's management put additional options in the contract Mundine's team decided to force the fight through mandatory position enabling a more favourable negotiation. In March 2012, Mundine turned down the opportunity to face Trout. The promotion of the fight went to a purse bid which Mundine did not pursue. The WBA stripped Mundine of his title in May 2012 for failing to meet the obligations for the mandatory fight. Mundine signed a short-term deal with American promoter Cameron Dunkin.

=== Mundine vs. Bronco McKart ===
On 14 July 2012, Mundine faced American Bronco McKart. It was Mundine's first fight in the United States, with the stated aim being to eventually challenge undefeated champion Floyd Mayweather Jr. Mundine went on to win the bout by seventh-round TKO. McKart's loss was his first stoppage defeat since 2006, when he lost to Kelly Pavlik, and only his third TKO defeat in 65 fights.

=== Mundine vs. Daniel Geale II ===
On 30 January 2013, Mundine fought Daniel Geale for the second time, with Geale's IBF title on the line. The bout was the first time two Australians have fought for the IBF world middleweight title. The fight was sought by Mundine as a stepping-stone to his ultimate desire of fighting world champion Floyd Mayweather Jr., while Geale was seeking to avenge his only professional career loss – which was to Mundine in 2009. This was the biggest boxing event in Australia since Mundine fought Danny Green in 2006. Featured on the undercards were Kimbo Slice and Joel Brunker, among others. Mundine went on to lose the bout by unanimous points decision 112–116, 111–117 and 111–117. However, he refused to accept the result and immediately after ring announcer Jimmy Lennon Jr. read out the result, Mundine and his entourage stormed out of the ring and left the arena. Following Mundine's attack on the fight judges and their scoring, New South Wales Combat Sports Authority chairman Denis Fitzgerald is seeking legal advice to determine whether Mundine can be sued for his outburst.

=== Mundine vs. Shane Mosley ===
Mundine was to have fought American boxing legend Shane Mosley on 23 October 2013, at the Sydney Entertainment Centre; however, the fight was called off at the last minute by Shane Moseley, who demanded $1 million before entering the ring. Mundine had sent $300,000 of his own money, and his friend Jeff Fenech also put in 1/2 million upon Mosely's arrival to Australia, but this was short of the required $1 million. Mundine was keen to reschedule the fight and managed to raise the required $1 million appearance money with his manager, and the fight eventually took place on 27 November at Allphones Arena. The fight ended after round 6 with Shane Mosley retiring due to back spasms, giving Mundine the victory via TKO.

=== Mundine vs. Joshua Clottey ===
On 9 April 2014, Mundine fought former IBF welterweight champion Joshua Clottey in Newcastle and lost by unanimous decision.

=== Mundine vs. Sergey Rabchenko ===
On 12 November 2014, Mundine fought then-undefeated European champion Sergey Rabchenko at Hisense Arena, Melbourne. The sponsorship manager of the fight was suspected Melbourne underworld figure, Mick Gatto. The undercard featured former NRL player Cory Paterson. Mundine came into the fight a huge underdog after his defeat to Clottey. Mundine went on to win the fight in a split decision, with the three judges scoring the fight 115–113 and 116–112 for Mundine, and 113–115 for Rabchenko. This made Mundine the mandatory contender for Floyd Mayweather Jr.'s WBC light middleweight title.

Following Rabchenko, Mundine was due to fight Austin Trout in San Antonio, Texas on 9 May 2015; however, Mundine had to pull out after sustaining a perforated ear drum prior to the fight. Mundine was later replaced with Luis Galarza.

== Business interests ==
Mundine has an extensive real estate portfolio and is also the owner of the sporting brand Boxa (est. 2000) and the Boxa Bar cafe in Hurstville. Early on the morning of 14 November 2013 the bar was destroyed by fire. Between 2000 and 2012, Mundine was managed by Khoder Nasser.

== Music career ==
Mundine appeared in the music video of Angry Anderson's 1990 hit song "Bound for Glory". In 2001 Mundine appeared as himself in the music video "Like a Dog" by the Australian rock group Powderfinger, whose frontman Bernard Fanning praised Mundine as "the perfect lead, in terms of what the song is about and the fact that he's prepared to speak up for what he believes in." In 2005 he featured on beatboxer Joel Turner's single "Knock U Out". He then released his own debut single, "Platinum Ryder", which also featured Nathan Merritt and Amos Roberts in the music video. The film clip created controversy for the burning of the Union Jack and a photo of then Prime Minister of Australia John Howard. Mundine also appeared in the Brothablack music video, Are You With Me Out There, along with league player Joe Williams. In 2008 Mundine featured in the video of a GetUp Mob version of the song "From Little Things Big Things Grow". In 2009 Mundine also appeared alongside Shannon Noll on the Street Warriors' debut album, Unstoppable Force.

=== Charted singles ===
List of singles, with selected chart positions
Title	Year	Peak chart positions
Title	Year	AUS
"Bronco Fever" (with Black Venom)	1997	99
"Knock U Out" (with Joel Turner and the Modern Day Poets)	2005	14

== Other media ==
Mundine has had a stormy relationship with the media: his conversion to Islam in 1999, self-promotion and outspoken opinions have created a love–hate relationship with the Australian public. Mundine has been described as "the most polarising athlete in Australian sports history".

In July 2002, both Anthony and his father Tony appeared on an episode of Burke's Backyard with veteran Australian Gardening guru Don Burke.

Also in 2002, he appeared with other stars and celebrities in Celebrity Big Brother. In 2003 he was in an episode of Greeks on the Roof and in 2005 he appeared on Dancing with the Stars.

From 2007 to 2009, he appeared on The Footy Show. He was in a five-hour interactive DVD called Raising Children: A Guide to Parenting from Birth to Five. This DVD also featured Russell Crowe, Danielle Spencer, Neil Perry, Stan Grant and Johanna Griggs. He has also appeared in The Contender Australia three times. And been a guest, starring as himself, on the Pizza TV series. In 2010 Mundine was a Special Guest Trainer on The Biggest Loser Australia: Couples 2.

Mundine's portrait by James Hunt, entitled Bora Anthony Mundine, was a notable finalist in the 2002 Archibald Prize.

Mundine is featured as part of the roster on the Fight Night Round 4 and Fight Night Champion videogames.

In October 2016, he appeared on Anh Do's Anh's Brush with Fame on ABC Television.

In January 2018, Mundine was revealed as a celebrity contestant on the fourth season of the Australian version of I'm a Celebrity...Get Me Out of Here!. As of 8 February 2018, Anthony Mundine became the second celebrity to walk out on the 2018 series of I'm a Celebrity Get me out of here Australia following Bernard Tomic.

== Recognition and awards ==
Mundine was named the Aboriginal and Torres Strait Islander Person of the Year in 2000. He is the first boxer in history to have had every one of his professional fights broadcast for television and has generated more pay-per-views than any other Australian boxer since he turned professional.

Steve Bunce described him as "arguably the greatest crossover athlete in boxing history".

In June 2014, the annual Anthony Mundine Award for Courage was created as one of three awards at the newly established National Indigenous Human Rights Awards in Sydney, New South Wales.

=== Deadly Awards ===
Year	Nominee / work	Award	Result
2007	Indigenous Male Sportsperson of the Year	Deadly Award Male Sportsperson of the Year	Won
2006	Indigenous Male Sportsperson of the Year	Deadly Award Male Sportsperson of the Year	Won
2003	Indigenous Male Sportsperson of the Year	Deadly Award Male Sportsperson of the Year	Won

== Public controversy ==
In an interview in October 2001, Mundine said of the 11 September terrorist attacks, "They call it an act of terrorism, but if you can understand religion, and our way of life, it's not about terrorism. It's about fighting for God's law, and America's brought it upon themselves". Offering some insight into his tendency to make controversial comments in the media, Mundine stated, "If you want to toe the line, if you want to be some corporate guy and say the right things, do the right things, you might be okay in the media's eye, but it won't be real for me". Mundine later claimed he was taken out of context: "Those comments were just spun around like I was clapping my hands. I have a family too, I know what it is like to suffer the loss of someone close to me, and I would never wish that upon anyone. The point I was trying to get across was that it was in a war state of mind, and there is always going to be tit for tat, so why put yourself in a situation where you can endanger people. I have got nothing against any American, I have got nothing against any human being. It breaks my heart that people think I would even have that line of thought about being happy about people dying. That is crap and I want to clarify that because it is wrong".

Mundine also referred to Cathy Freeman as a sellout: "Cathy Freeman. She sold out, toeing the line. And that ain't me. I'm not a fake." He also went on to state repeated times that men, not women, are more qualified to lead. "As far as being a leader, that's not her anyway, a man can only lead."

In late 2012, Mundine questioned former opponent WBA/IBF champion Daniel Geale's indigenous Tasmanian heritage by saying that he should not wear the Australian Aboriginal flag on his shorts: "I thought they wiped all the Aborigines from Tasmania out.... He's got a white woman, he's got white kids. I keep it real, all day every day". When asked whether Geale deserved to sport the Aboriginal flag on his trunks, he said, "No". Mundine later apologised to the Tasmanian Aboriginal community and added that he felt many people claimed indigenous heritage to receive government benefits but had no real connection with their Aboriginal roots. He also claimed that Australia was one of "the most racist nations in the world" before calling for the Australian anthem and the Australian flag to be changed to be more inclusive of indigenous Australians.

In November 2013, Mundine, an Aboriginal Australian, made comments on Twitter stating that homosexuality was incompatible with Aboriginal beliefs. Following Mundine's comments, Aboriginal actor Luke Carroll pointed out that Mundine's own religious beliefs that led him to form his opinions on homosexuality were incompatible with the Aboriginal Dreamtime. On coming out in a 2015 interview with NITV, former NRL player Casey Conway described Mundine's comments as "really disappointing" and unrepresentative of the Aboriginal community, describing the damage that homophobic comments can do to young people.

Mundine is a strong opponent of lockdown measures in response to the COVID-19 pandemic. On 25 July, he attended a large anti-lockdown protest in Sydney breaching gathering laws, despite previously receiving two fines for breaking lockdown laws by flying from Sydney to Ballina without a reasonable excuse and refusing to wear a mask while shopping. He also opposes COVID-19 vaccination, writing on Facebook, “You take the shot then you will have serious health problems even death!”. Mundine considers the vaccine rollout to be an attempt to depopulate the Earth.

In March 2024, Mundine became involved in a war of words with South Sydney player Latrell Mitchell in relation to a racism controversy in the NRL. Mundine had originally responded with an Instagram video where he said Ezra Mam needed to “take it on the chin” and “toughen up” in relation to Mam being called a "Monkey" by Sydney Roosters player Spencer Leniu. Mitchell then responded with a post to Mundine attacking him for his comments. Mundine then responded to Mitchell saying “You’ve been underperforming far too long & been lucky to have Cody by your side to hold your hand, Earn the right to talk before you start trying to disrespect the OG of the game. Remember, despite what you might think, you’re no Greg Inglis & you’re certainly no Anthony Mundine".

== Professional boxing record ==
59 fights	48 wins	11 losses
By knockout	28	5
By decision	20	6

No.	Result	Record	Opponent	Type	Round, time	Date	Location	Notes
59	Loss	48–11	Michael Zerafa	TKO	1 (10), 2:09	13 Mar 2021	Bendigo Stadium, Bendigo, Australia	For vacant WBA Oceania middleweight title
58	Loss	48–10	John Wayne Parr	SD	10	30 Nov 2019	Convention Centre, Brisbane, Australia	
57	Loss	48–9	Jeff Horn	KO	1 (12), 1:36	30 Nov 2018	Suncorp Stadium, Brisbane, Australia	Lost WBO Oriental middleweight title; For vacant WBA Oceania middleweight title
56	Win	48–8	Tommy Browne	TKO	2 (10), 2:59	17 Jan 2018	Star City Casino, Sydney, Australia	Won vacant WBO Oriental middleweight title
55	Loss	47–8	Danny Green	MD	10	3 Feb 2017	Adelaide Oval, Adelaide, Australia	For Australian cruiserweight title
54	Loss	47–7	Charles Hatley	TKO	11 (12), 1:38	11 Nov 2015	Convention and Exhibition Centre, Melbourne, Australia	Lost WBC Silver super-welterweight title
53	Win	47–6	Sergey Rabchenko	SD	12	12 Nov 2014	Hisense Arena, Melbourne, Australia	Won WBC Silver super-welterweight title
52	Loss	46–6	Joshua Clottey	UD	12	9 Apr 2014	Entertainment Centre, Newcastle, Australia	Lost WBA International super-welterweight title
51	Win	46–5	Gunnar Jackson	UD	10	29 Jan 2014	Entertainment Centre, Brisbane, Australia	
50	Win	45–5	Shane Mosley	RTD	6 (12), 3:00	27 Nov 2013	Allphones Arena, Sydney, Australia	Won vacant WBA International super-welterweight title
49	Loss	44–5	Daniel Geale	UD	12	30 Jan 2013	Entertainment Centre, Sydney, Australia	For IBF middleweight title
48	Win	44–4	Bronco McKart	TKO	7 (10), 2:04	14 Jul 2012	Pearl Concert Theater, Paradise, Nevada, US	Won vacant IBF North American middleweight title
47	Win	43–4	Rigoberto Álvarez	UD	12	19 Oct 2011	Entertainment Centre, Newcastle, Australia	Won vacant WBA interim super-welterweight title
46	Win	42–4	Xavier Toliver	TKO	7 (10)	5 Jun 2011	The Trusts Arena, Auckland, New Zealand	
45	Win	41–4	Garth Wood	UD	10	13 Apr 2011	Entertainment Centre, Brisbane, Australia	
44	Loss	40–4	Garth Wood	KO	5 (10), 0:58	8 Dec 2010	Acer Arena, Sydney, Australia	
43	Win	40–3	Ryan Waters	TKO	10 (12), 0:24	15 Sep 2010	Entertainment Centre, Wollongong, Australia	
42	Win	39–3	Carlos Adán Jerez	UD	12	30 Jun 2010	Entertainment Centre, Brisbane, Australia	
41	Win	38–3	Robert Medley	UD	12	11 Jan 2010	Entertainment Centre, Sydney, Australia	
40	Win	37–3	Alejandro Gustavo Falliga	UD	10	21 Oct 2009	Silverdome, Launceston, Australia	
39	Win	36–3	Daniel Geale	SD	12	27 May 2009	Entertainment Centre, Brisbane, Australia	Won IBO middleweight title
38	Win	35–3	Shannan Taylor	UD	12	11 Feb 2009	Entertainment Centre, Wollongong, Australia	Won vacant WBA International middleweight title
37	Win	34–3	Rafael Sosa Pintos	UD	10	11 Dec 2008	E.G. Whitlam Recreation Centre, Sydney, Australia	
36	Win	33–3	Crazy Kim	UD	10	30 Jul 2008	Entertainment Centre, Newcastle, Australia	
35	Win	32–3	Sam Soliman	UD	12	28 May 2008	Vodafone Arena, Melbourne, Australia	Retained WBA (Regular) super-middleweight title
34	Win	31–3	Nader Hamdan	UD	12	27 Feb 2008	Entertainment Centre, Sydney, Australia	Retained WBA (Regular) super-middleweight title
33	Win	30–3	Jose Alberto Clavero	KO	4 (12), 2:14	10 Dec 2007	Entertainment Centre, Sydney, Australia	Retained WBA (Regular) super-middleweight title
32	Win	29–3	Pablo Daniel Zamora	UD	12	27 Jun 2007	Convention and Exhibition Centre, Gold Coast, Australia	Retained WBA (Regular) super-middleweight title
31	Win	28–3	Sam Soliman	KO	9 (12), 2:26	7 Mar 2007	Entertainment Centre, Sydney, Australia	Won vacant WBA (Regular) super-middleweight title
30	Win	27–3	Ruben Eduardo Acosta	KO	4 (10), 1:41	15 Nov 2006	Entertainment Centre, Newcastle, Australia	
29	Win	26–3	Danny Green	UD	12	17 May 2006	Sydney Football Stadium, Sydney, Australia	
28	Win	25–3	Rico Chong Nee	TKO	3 (10), 3:00	11 Dec 2005	Challenge Stadium, Perth, Australia	
27	Win	24–3	Rashi Ali Hadj Matumla	TKO	6 (10), 0:36	7 Sep 2005	Canberra Stadium, Canberra, Australia	
26	Loss	23–3	Mikkel Kessler	UD	12	8 Jun 2005	Entertainment Centre, Sydney, Australia	For WBA super-middleweight title
25	Win	23–2	Darmel Castillo	TKO	4 (10), 2:31	2 Feb 2005	Convention and Exhibition Centre, Gold Coast, Australia	
24	Win	22–2	Juarne Dowling	TKO	3 (10), 2:19	13 Oct 2004	Indoor Sports Centre, Carrara, Australia	
23	Win	21–2	Sean Sullivan	TKO	10 (10), 0:47	8 Sep 2004	E.G. Whitlam Recreation Centre, Sydney, Australia	
22	Loss	20–2	Manny Siaca	SD	12	5 May 2004	Entertainment Centre, Sydney, Australia	Lost WBA super-middleweight title
21	Win	20–1	Yoshinori Nishizawa	TKO	5 (12), 0:43	19 Jan 2004	Entertainment Centre, Wollongong, Australia	Retained WBA (Regular) super-middleweight title
20	Win	19–1	Antwun Echols	UD	12	3 Sep 2003	Entertainment Centre, Sydney, Australia	Won vacant WBA (Regular) super-middleweight title
19	Win	18–1	Rogerio Cacciatore	TKO	1 (10), 1:44	17 Mar 2003	Indoor Sports Centre, Carrara, Australia	
18	Win	17–1	Sean Sullivan	UD	12	1 Feb 2003	ASB Stadium, Auckland, New Zealand	Retained WBA Pan African, WBA Fedelatin, and PABA super-middleweight titles
17	Win	16–1	Rick Thornberry	TKO	11 (12)	2 Nov 2002	Indoor Sports Centre, Carrara, Australia	Retained WBA Pan African and PABA super-middleweight titles; Won WBA Fedelatin super-middleweight title
16	Win	15–1	Soon Botes	KO	3 (12)	2 Sep 2002	E.G. Whitlam Recreation Centre, Sydney, Australia	Retained PABA super-middleweight title; Won vacant WBA Pan African super-middleweight title
15	Win	14–1	Lester Ellis	TKO	3 (10), 2:04	15 Jul 2002	Vodafone Arena, Melbourne, Australia	
14	Win	13–1	Darren Obah	TKO	6 (12)	3 Jun 2002	E.G. Whitlam Recreation Centre, Sydney, Australia	Retained PABA super-middleweight title
13	Win	12–1	Roland Francis	TKO	8 (12)	1 Apr 2002	Indoor Sports Centre, Carrara, Australia	Won vacant PABA super-middleweight title
12	Win	11–1	Brad Mayo	UD	10	4 Mar 2002	Entertainment Centre, Townsville, Australia	
11	Loss	10–1	Sven Ottke	KO	10 (12)	1 Dec 2001	Westfalenhalle, Dortmund, Germany	For IBF super-middleweight title
10	Win	10–0	Guy Waters	KO	2 (12)	20 Oct 2001	E.G. Whitlam Recreation Centre, Sydney, Australia	Retained IBF Pan Pacific super-middleweight title
9	Win	9–0	Sam Soliman	SD	12	3 Sep 2001	Entertainment Centre, Wollongong, Australia	Won vacant IBF Pan Pacific super-middleweight title
8	Win	8–0	Kevin Pompey	TKO	3 (8), 0:57	10 Jul 2001	Centre Molson, Montreal, Quebec, Canada	
7	Win	7–0	Mike Makata	TKO	5 (12)	18 Jun 2001	E.G. Whitlam Recreation Centre, Sydney, Australia	Retained PABA super-middleweight title
6	Win	6–0	Timo Masua	KO	3 (12)	16 Apr 2001	Indoor Sports Centre, Carrara, Australia	Won PABA super-middleweight title
5	Win	5–0	Marc Bargero	TKO	6 (12)	19 Feb 2001	NorthPower Stadium at Grahame Park, Gosford, Australia	Won Australian super-middleweight title
4	Win	4–0	Ian McLeod	TKO	9 (10)	11 Dec 2000	Entertainment Centre, Wollongong, Australia	
3	Win	3–0	Heath Stenton	UD	8	30 Oct 2000	Festival Hall, Melbourne, Australia	
2	Win	2–0	Nik Taumafai	TKO	6 (8)	4 Sep 2000	Hordern Pavilion, Sydney, Australia	
1	Win	1–0	Gerrard Zohs	KO	4 (8)	3 Jul 2000	Entertainment Centre, Sydney, Australia	

== Personal life ==
One of Mundine's sons, Anthony Mundine III, is a basketball player who in 2026 is playing for the Bankstown Bruins in the NBL1 East and another son, Rahim, is a professional boxer.

Sporting positions
Regional boxing titles
Preceded by Marc Bargero	Australian super-middleweight champion 19 February 2001 – October 2001; Vacated	Vacant Title next held by Marc Bargero
Preceded by Timo Masua	PABA super-middleweight champion 16 April 2001 – December 2001; Vacated	Vacant Title next held by Himself
Vacant Title last held by Himself	PABA super-middleweight champion 1 April 2002 – September 2003; Vacated	Vacant Title next held by Stewart Moller
New title	WBA Pan African super-middleweight champion 2 September 2002 – September 2003; Vacated	Vacant Title next held by Mpush Makambi
Preceded by Sean Sullivan	WBA Fedelatin super-middleweight champion 2 November 2002 – September 2003; Vacated	Vacant Title next held by Henry Porras
New title	WBA International middleweight champion 11 February 2009 – January 2010; Vacated	Vacant Title next held by Mahir Oral
New title	IBF North American middleweight champion 14 July 2012 – 30 January 2013; Lost bid for world title	Title discontinued
Vacant Title last held by Damian Jonak	WBA International super-welterweight champion 27 November 2013 – 9 April 2014	Succeeded by Joshua Clottey
Preceded by Sergey Rabchenko	WBC Silver super-welterweight champion 27 November 2013 – 11 November 2015	Succeeded by Charles Hatley
Vacant Title last held by Kerry Hope	WBO Oriental middleweight champion 17 January 2018 – 30 November 2018	Succeeded by Jeff Horn
Minor world boxing titles
Preceded by Daniel Geale	IBO middleweight champion 27 May 2009 – January 2010; Vacated	Vacant Title next held by Peter Manfredo Jr.
Major world boxing titles
New title	WBA (Regular) super middleweight champion 3 September 2003 – 27 March 2004	Vacant Title next held by Himself
Vacant Title last held by Sven Ottke as Unified champion	WBA super-middleweight champion 27 March 2004 – 5 May 2004	Succeeded by Manny Siaca
Vacant Title last held by Himself	WBA super-middleweight champion Regular title 7 March 2007 – 27 May 2008; Vacated	Vacant Title next held by Mikkel Kessler
Vacant Title last held by Rigoberto Álvarez	WBA super-welterweight champion Interim title 19 October 2011 – July 2012; Vacated	Vacant Title next held by Erislandy Lara
