= Spacey Jane discography =

Discography of Australian group Spacey Jane

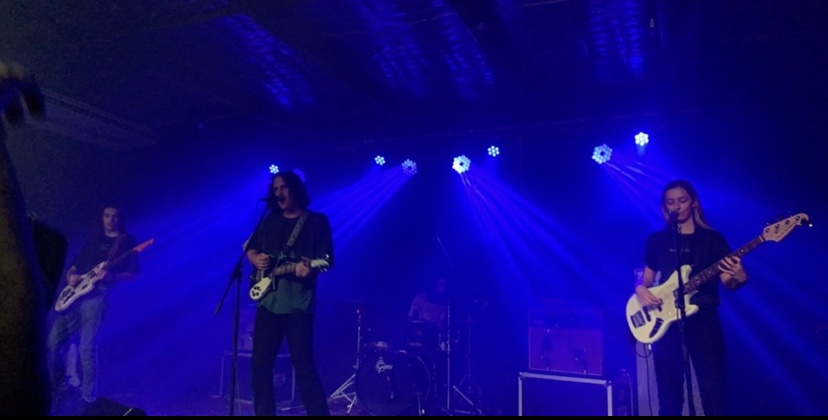
- Spacey Jane in November 2019
- Studio albums: 3
- EPs: 3
- Live albums: 1
- Singles: 31

The discography of Australian indie rock band Spacey Jane consists of three studio albums, one live album and three extended plays since their formation in 2017. The group have been nominated for many awards, including AIR Awards, APRA Awards and ARIA Music Awards, winning several.

== Albums ==
=== Studio albums ===
List of studio albums, with release date, label, and selected chart positions shown
Title	Album details	Peak chart positions			Certifications
Title	Album details	AUS	NZ	SCO	Certifications
Sunlight	Released: 12 June 2020; Label: AWAL (SPACJ005); Formats: LP, CD, digital	2	—	—	ARIA: Gold
Here Comes Everybody	Released: 24 June 2022; Label: AWAL (SPACJ008); Formats: LP, CD, cassette, digital	1	—	—	ARIA: Gold
If That Makes Sense	Released: 9 May 2025; Label: AWAL (SPACJ011); Formats: LP, CD, digital	2	20	27	
"—" denotes releases that did not chart in that territory.

=== Live albums ===
List of live albums, with release date, label, and selected chart positions shown
Title	Album details	Peak chart positions
Title	Album details	AUS
Live at the Hordern Pavilion, Sydney	Released: 18 April 2026; Label: Concord; Formats: 2×LP; Note: Record Store Day Exclusive	30

== Extended plays ==
List of EPs, with release date, label, and selected chart positions shown
Title	EP details	Peak chart positions
Title	EP details	AUS
No Way to Treat an Animal	Released: 16 November 2017; Label: Self-released (SPACJ007); Formats: LP, CD, digital	23
In the Slight	Released: 8 November 2018; Label: Self-released (SPACJ006); Formats: LP, digital	—
Exit Wounds	Released: 12 June 2026; Label: AWAL, Self-released (SPACJ007); Formats: digital, CD	43
"—" denotes releases that did not chart in that territory.

=== Streaming-exclusive releases ===
List of streaming-exclusive releases with release date, label and description shown
Title	Details	Description
Apple Music Home Session: Spacey Jane	Released: 23 August 2021; Label: AWAL	Acoustic versions of "Booster Seat" and "Lots of Nothing" and a cover of "Scott Street" by Phoebe Bridgers, exclusively released on Apple Music and the iTunes Store
Spotify Singles	Released: 17 August 2022; Label: AWAL	An acoustic version of "Hardlight" and a cover of "The Only Exception" by Paramore, exclusively released on Spotify

== Singles ==
List of singles, with year released, selected chart positions, certifications, and album name shown
Title	Year	Peak chart positions			Certifications	Album
Title	Year	AUS	JJJ Hottest 100	NZ Hot	Certifications	Album
"Still Running"	2017	—	—	—		No Way to Treat an Animal
"Feeding the Family"	2017	—	—	—	ARIA: 3× Platinum; RMNZ: Gold	No Way to Treat an Animal
"Thrills"	2017	—	—	—		No Way to Treat an Animal
"Old Enough"/"So You Wanna"	2018	—	—	—		In the Meantime (Note: In the Meantime is a dual single.)
"Cold Feet"	2018	—	—	—		In the Slight
"Keep a Clean Nose"	2018	—	—	—		In the Slight
"Good Grief"	2019	—	— (Note: "Good Grief" did not enter the 2019 Hottest 100, but did chart at number 185 in the Hottest 200.)	—		Sunlight
"Good for You"	2019	—	80	—	ARIA: 2× Platinum; RMNZ: Gold	Sunlight
"Head Cold"	2019	—	—	—	ARIA: Platinum	Sunlight
"Skin"	2020	—	15	—	ARIA: Platinum; RMNZ: Gold	Sunlight
"Straightfaced"	2020	—	28	—		Sunlight
"Booster Seat"	2020	8	2 (Note: "Booster Seat" has polled twice: No. 2 in the Hottest 100 of 2020, and No. 34 in the Hottest 100 of Australian Songs (2025).)	—	ARIA: 7× Platinum; RMNZ: Platinum	Sunlight
"Here Comes the Sun" (The Beatles cover)	2021	—	14 (Note: "Here Comes the Sun" has polled twice: No. 30 in the Hottest 100 of 2021, and No. 14 in the Hottest 100 of Like a Version (2023).)	—		Non-album single
"Lots of Nothing"	2021	34	3	36	ARIA: 3× Platinum; RMNZ: Gold	Here Comes Everybody
"Lunchtime"	2021	—	12	—	ARIA: Gold	Here Comes Everybody
"Sitting Up"	2022	—	6	40	ARIA: Gold	Here Comes Everybody
"It's Been a Long Day"	2022	79	5	26	ARIA: Gold	Here Comes Everybody
"Hardlight"	2022	68	3	37	ARIA: Gold	Here Comes Everybody
"Pulling Through"	2022	—	25	—		Here Comes Everybody
"Lots of Nothing" (Benee remix)	2023	—	—	34		Here Comes Everybody (Deluxe)
"Sorry Instead"	2023	—	20	29		Here Comes Everybody (Deluxe)
"One Bad Day"	2024	—	18	27		Non-album single
"All the Noise"	2025	—	25	19		If That Makes Sense
"How to Kill Houseplants"	2025	—	42	8		If That Makes Sense
"Through My Teeth"	2025	—	31	—		If That Makes Sense
"Whateverrrr"	2025	76	6	12	ARIA: Gold	If That Makes Sense
"Estimated Delivery" (Mallrat remix)	2025	—	39 (Note: The original version of "Estimated Delivery" polled at No. 39 in the Hottest 100 of 2025.)	—		If That Makes Sense
"Please Come Home for Christmas" (Note: This single was released exclusively on Amazon Music.) (Eagles cover)	2025	—	—	—		Non-album single
"Do You Really Love Her"	2026	— (Note: "Do You Really Love Her" did not enter the ARIA top 100, but peaked at number 4 on the Australian Artist Chart.)	—	7		Exit Wounds
"I Never See Her"	2026	— (Note: "I Never See Her" did not enter the ARIA top 100, but peaked at number 10 on the Australian Artist Chart.)	—	23		Exit Wounds
"East Village"	2026	— (Note: "East Village" did not enter the ARIA top 100, but peaked at number 12 on the Australian Artist Chart.)	—	19		Exit Wounds
"—" denotes releases that did not chart in that territory.

=== Other charted songs ===
List of other charted songs, with year released, selected chart positions, and album name shown
Title	Year	Peak chart positions		Album
Title	Year	JJJ Hottest 100	NZ Hot	Album
"Weightless"	2020	81	—	Sunlight
"Yet"	2022	40	—	Here Comes Everybody
"Bothers Me"	2022	75	—	Here Comes Everybody
"Estimated Delivery"	2025	39	—	If That Makes Sense
"Impossible to Say"	2025	—	27	If That Makes Sense
"I Can't Afford to Lose You"	2025	—	30	If That Makes Sense
"So Much Taller"	2025	—	29	If That Makes Sense
"—" denotes releases that did not chart in that territory.

=== Other appearances ===
List of songs contributing to other albums
Song	Year	Album
"D.O.R.O.T.H.Y (My Favourite Dinosaur)" (The Wiggles cover)	2022	ReWiggled

== See also ==
- Music of Australia
