= Triple J's Hottest 100 of 2022 =

30th edition of annual Australian music poll

2022 Triple J Hottest 100

Countdown details
- Date of countdown: 28 January 2023
- Charity partner: Australian Conservation Foundation
- Votes cast: 2,436,565

Countdown highlights
- Winning song: Flume featuring May-a "Say Nothing"
- Most entries: Spacey Jane (6 tracks)

Chronology
← Previous; 2021	Next → 2023 (Like a Version)

The 2022 Triple J Hottest 100 was announced on 28 January 2023. It was the 30th annual countdown of the most popular songs of the year, as voted for by listeners of Australian radio station triple j. The day before, the Hottest 200 played, counting down songs 200–101. Merchandise sales from the event supported the Australian Conservation Foundation.

Australian musician Flume's song "Say Nothing" featuring May-a was voted into first place. Australian band Spacey Jane had the most entries, with six, including three in the top 10. Over 2.4 million votes were submitted, and 57 entries in the countdown originated from Australian artists.

== Background ==
Any song initially released between 1 December 2021 and 30 November 2022 was eligible for the triple j Hottest 100 of 2022. The triple j Hottest 100 allows members of the public to vote online for their top ten songs of the year, which are then used to calculate the year's 100 most popular songs. Voting opened on 13 December 2022, and closed on 23 January 2023.

The 2021 triple j Hottest 100 culminated with the Wiggles' Like a Version cover of Tame Impala's "Elephant" reaching number one. Over $1.2 million was raised for crisis support organisation Lifeline, the countdown's partner.

=== Projections ===
On 10 January 2023, triple j announced there were fewer than 125 votes separating the top two songs. Online database 100 Warm Tunas, "the internet's most accurate prediction" of Hottest 100 results, was favouring "In the Wake of Your Leave" by Australian alternative rock band Gang of Youths to take the top spot, followed by "Hardlight" by Fremantle-based rock band Spacey Jane and "Stars in My Eyes" by Brisbane-based pop rock band Ball Park Music. The former two bands also had major wins in the triple j Album Poll and the 2022 J Awards respectively. On the day of the countdown, Sportsbet had English DJs Eliza Rose and Interplanetary Criminal's "B.O.T.A. (Baddest of Them All)" and Australian producer Flume's "Say Nothing" as the most likely to win outright.

== Full list ==
Note: Australian artists

#	Song	Artist	Country of origin
1	Say Nothing	Flume featuring May-a	Australia
2	B.O.T.A. (Baddest of Them All)	Eliza Rose and Interplanetary Criminal	United Kingdom
3	Hardlight	Spacey Jane	Australia
4	Bad Habit	Steve Lacy	United States
5	It's Been a Long Day	Spacey Jane	Australia
6	Sitting Up	Spacey Jane	Australia
7	About Damn Time	Lizzo	United States
8	Stars in My Eyes	Ball Park Music	Australia
9	In the Wake of Your Leave	Gang of Youths	Australia
10	Glimpse of Us	Joji	Japan
11	Gay 4 Me	G Flip featuring Lauren Sanderson	Australia/United States
12	First Class	Jack Harlow	United States
13	New Gold	Gorillaz featuring Tame Impala and Bootie Brown	United Kingdom/Australia/United States
14	Delilah (Pull Me Out of This)	Fred Again and Delilah Montagu	United Kingdom
15	Facts of Life	Lime Cordiale	Australia
16	God Is a Freak	Peach PRC	Australia
17	Get Inspired	Genesis Owusu	Ghana/Australia
18	Turn On the Lights Again	Fred Again and Swedish House Mafia featuring Future	United Kingdom/Sweden/United States
19	Stranger Days	Skegss	Australia
20	Shirt	SZA	United States
21	Backseat of My Mind	Thelma Plum	Australia
22	Vegas	Doja Cat	United States
23	Am I Ever Gonna See Your Face Again (Like a Version)	Dune Rats	Australia
24	Cuff It	Beyoncé	United States
25	Pulling Through	Spacey Jane	Australia
26	Jungle	Fred Again	United Kingdom
27	Camp Dog	King Stingray	Australia
28	Big City Life	Luude and Mattafix	Australia/United Kingdom
29	Clarity	Vance Joy	Australia
30	Shooting Stars (Like a Version)	Flume featuring Toro y Moi	Australia/United States
31	Wish You Well	Baker Boy featuring Bernard Fanning	Australia
32	TV	Billie Eilish	United States
33	Thousand Miles	The Kid Laroi	Australia
34	Colin	Lime Cordiale	Australia
35	Let's Go	King Stingray	Australia
36	2 Be Loved (Am I Ready)	Lizzo	United States
37	Miracle Maker	Dom Dolla featuring Clementine Douglas	Australia/United Kingdom
38	Strangers	Bring Me the Horizon	United Kingdom
39	Doja	Central Cee	United Kingdom
40	Yet	Spacey Jane	Australia
41	N95	Kendrick Lamar	United States
42	Break My Soul	Beyoncé	United States
43	Yellow (Like a Version)	King Stingray	Australia
44	Rich Flex	Drake and 21 Savage	Canada/United Kingdom
45	This Is Why	Paramore	United States
46	Ripple	Sycco featuring Flume and Chrome Sparks	Australia/United States
47	Growing Up Is	Ruel	United Kingdom/Australia
48	It's a Killa	Fisher and Shermanology	Australia/Netherlands
49	Star Walkin' (League of Legends Worlds Anthem)	Lil Nas X	United States
50	Slugger 1.4 (2014 Export.WAV)	Flume	Australia
51	I Like You (A Happier Song)	Post Malone and Doja Cat	United States
52	Burn Dem Bridges	Skin on Skin	Australia
53	6L GTR	The Chats	Australia
54	A Whole Day's Night	Hilltop Hoods featuring Montaigne and Tom Thum	Australia
55	Girl Sports	Teen Jesus and the Jean Teasers	Australia
56	Deepest Darkness	Ocean Alley	Australia
57	Leaving for London	Pacific Avenue	Australia
58	I'm in Love with You	The 1975	United Kingdom
59	Double Vision	Ocean Alley	Australia
60	Country Club	Lime Cordiale	Australia
61	Messy in Heaven	Venbee and Goddard	United Kingdom
62	Home	Ocean Alley	Australia
63	Teddy	Teenage Dads	Australia
64	Anakin	The Rions	Australia
65	Forever Drunk	Peach PRC	Australia
66	The Brown Snake	Thelma Plum	Australia
67	Escapism	Raye featuring 070 Shake	United Kingdom/United States
68	Yeah the Girls	Fisher featuring Meryll	Australia/Netherlands
69	Maybe	Machine Gun Kelly featuring Bring Me the Horizon	United States/United Kingdom
70	Only Wanna Be with You	Amy Shark	Australia
71	Show Business	Hilltop Hoods featuring Eamon	Australia/United States
72	Static	Steve Lacy	United States
73	No Choice	Tame Impala	Australia
74	She's All I Wanna Be	Tate McRae	Canada
75	Bothers Me	Spacey Jane	Australia
76	Jimmy Cooks	Drake featuring 21 Savage	Canada/United Kingdom
77	There'd Better Be a Mirrorball	Arctic Monkeys	United Kingdom
78	Kamikaze	Violent Soho	Australia
79	Body Paint	Arctic Monkeys	United Kingdom
80	Walkin	Denzel Curry	United States
81	Beach Boy	Benee	New Zealand
82	Is This What It Feels Like to Feel Like This?	The Wombats	United Kingdom
83	Handful	Beddy Rays	Australia
84	The 30th	Billie Eilish	United States
85	Everybody's Saying Thursday's the Weekend	DMA's	Australia
86	Glitch	Parkway Drive	Australia
87	GTFO	Genesis Owusu	Ghana/Australia
88	Oh Caroline	The 1975	United Kingdom
89	Show Me Your God	The Amity Affliction	Australia
90	I Don't Wanna Do Nothing Forever	The Smith Street Band	Australia
91	Free	Florence & the Machine	United Kingdom
92	Alright	Sam Fender	United Kingdom
93	Holy Moley	Lime Cordiale and Idris Elba	Australia/United Kingdom
94	Lupa	King Stingray	Australia
95	Evergreen (You Didn't Deserve Me at All)	Omar Apollo	United States
96	Waste of Space	G Flip	Australia
97	Betty (Get Money)	Yung Gravy	United States
98	Bad Memories	Meduza and James Carter featuring Elley Duhé and Fast Boy	Italy/United Kingdom/United States/Germany
99	Sidelines	Phoebe Bridgers	United States
100	Danielle (Smile on My Face)	Fred Again and 070 Shake	United Kingdom/United States

=== #101–200 list ===
On 29 January 2023, Triple J announced the songs that made the #101–200 positions.

#	Song	Artist	Country of origin
101	Starlight	Dave	United Kingdom
102	Nail Tech	Jack Harlow	United States
103	Running Up That Hill (Like a Version)	The Wombats	United Kingdom
104	Passing Through	Sly Withers	Australia
105	Why Does It Always Rain on Me? (Like a Version)	Gang of Youths	Australia
106	Singing Blackbird	Adam Newling	Australia
107	Milk	Beddy Rays	Australia
108	Pamela Aniston	Dune Rats	Australia
109	Get Me Outta Here	G Flip	Australia
110	Die Hard	Kendrick Lamar, Blxst and Amanda Reifer	United States/Barbados
111	The Foundations of Decay	My Chemical Romance	United States
112	Cowboys Don't Cry	Oliver Tree	United States
113	Haircut	Spacey Jane	Australia
114	Manny	Ball Park Music	Australia
115	Ur Mum	Wet Leg	United Kingdom
116	Looking for Somebody (To Love)	The 1975	United Kingdom
117	Ready for the Sky	Budjerah	Australia
118	Honest	Peking Duk featuring Slayyyter	Australia/United States
119	Surprise Me	Mallrat featuring Azealia Banks	Australia/United States
120	Heaven Takes You Home	Swedish House Mafia featuring Connie Constance	Sweden/United Kingdom
121	Edging	Blink-182	United States
122	Waiting For You	The Terrys	Australia
123	Where I Go	Old Mervs	Australia
124	What a Memorable Night	Dune Rats	Australia
125	Cracker Island	Gorillaz featuring Thundercat	United Kingdom/United States
126	Hollow	Flume featuring Emma Louise	Australia
127	I'm Tired	Labrinth and Zendaya	United Kingdom/United States
128	Forget You	Slowly Slowly	Australia
129	Massive	Drake	Canada
130	Happiness	The 1975	United Kingdom
131	The Perfect Pair	Beabadoobee	United Kingdom
132	Catch My Disease (Like a Version)	The Terrys	Australia
133	Double Espresso	Dice	Australia
134	So Good	Halsey	United States
135	Your Love	Mallrat	Australia
136	Coal Makes Me Cum	The Chaser	Australia
137	Sacrifice	The Weeknd	Canada
138	Dua Lipa	Jack Harlow	United States
139	Always Got the Love	Cub Sport	Australia
140	Holiday	Lime Cordiale and Idris Elba	Australia/United Kingdom
141	My Love	Florence & the Machine	United Kingdom
142	Say My Name (Like a Version)	Glass Animals	United Kingdom
143	You In Everything	Gang of Youths	Australia
144	Baby	Aitch and Ashanti	United Kingdom/United States
145	Father Time	Kendrick Lamar featuring Sampha	United States/United Kingdom
146	Hide & Seek	Stormzy	United Kingdom
147	T's to Cross	Hockey Dad	Australia
148	Sirens	Flume featuring Caroline Polachek	Australia/United States
149	Cash In Cash Out	Pharrell Williams featuring 21 Savage and Tyler, the Creator	United States
150	Not Another Rockstar	Maisie Peters	United Kingdom
151	Luvin U is Easy	Confidence Man	Australia
152	Spend It	Peking Duk featuring Circa Waves	Australia/United Kingdom
153	2am	Foals	United Kingdom
154	The Kingdom is Within You	Gang of Youths	Australia
155	Terrible	Teenage Joans	Australia
156	Someone Else's Problem	Ruel	Australia
157	Proof	Methyl Ethel featuring Stella Donnelly	Australia
158	Vigil	Golden Features	Australia
159	I Feel Electric	Daniel Johns featuring Moxie Raia	Australia/United States
160	Out of Time	The Weeknd	Canada
161	Mercury	Steve Lacy	United States
162	Is It Worth Being Sad	Meg Mac	Australia
163	Waterfall	Disclosure and Raye	United Kingdom
164	October Passed Me By	Girl in Red	Norway
165	Weirder & Weirder	Ball Park Music	Australia
166	Rich Spirit	Kendrick Lamar	United States
167	Pity Party	Stand Atlantic featuring Royal & the Serpent	Australia/United States
168	Can't Do Without (My Baby)	Cosmo's Midnight	Australia
169	Cranky Boy	Northeast Party House	Australia
170	Wait For U	Future featuring Drake and Tems	United States/Canada/Nigeria
171	Alien Superstar	Beyoncé	United States
172	Emo Girl	Machine Gun Kelly featuring Willow	United States
173	Goal of the Century	Gang of Youths	Australia
174	Seventeen Going Under (Like a Version)	Camp Cope	Australia
175	Catalonia	Vance Joy	Australia
176	Highest Building	Flume featuring Oklou	Australia/France
177	Surround Sound	JID featuring 21 Savage and Baby Tate	United States
178	Oysters in My Pocket	Royel Otis	Australia
179	You Against Yourself	Ruel	Australia
180	Situation 99	The Terrys	Australia
181	Holiday	Crooked Colours	Australia
182	I Don't Need To Hide	DMA's	Australia
183	Exit Sign	Teenage Dads	Australia
184	Sweetest Pie	Megan Thee Stallion and Dua Lipa	United States/United Kingdom
185	King	Florence & the Machine	United Kingdom
186	King Billy Cokebottle	A.B. Original	Australia
187	Twin Flame	Kaytranada and Anderson .Paak	Canada/United States
188	Red Flags	The Buoys	Australia
189	Running With the Hurricane	Camp Cope	Australia
190	10:35	Tiësto and Tate McRae	Netherlands/Canada
191	Don't Fade	Vance Joy	Australia
192	2 Die 4	Tove Lo	Sweden
193	Palm Beach Banga	Fisher	Australia
194	Good Times	Jungle	United Kingdom
195	Why Do I Keep You?	Telenova	Australia
196	Flip Me Upside Down	The Wombats	United Kingdom
197	Haircut	Alex the Astronaut	Australia
198	Teeth	Mallrat	Australia
199	Summer in New York	Sofi Tukker	United States
200	Song 2 (Like a Version)	Baker Boy	Australia

== Statistics ==
=== Artists with multiple entries ===
#	Artist	Tracks
6	Spacey Jane	3, 5, 6, 25, 40, 75
4	Flume (Note: Three as a lead artist (1, 30, 50) and once with Sycco (46))	1, 30, 46, 50
4	Fred Again	14, 18, 26, 100
4	Lime Cordiale	15, 34, 60, 93
4	King Stingray	27, 35, 43, 94
3	Ocean Alley	56, 59, 62
2	Steve Lacy	4, 72
2	Lizzo	7, 36
2	G Flip	11, 96
2	Tame Impala (Note: once solo (73) and once with Gorillaz (13))	13, 73
2	Peach PRC	16, 65
2	Genesis Owusu	17, 87
2	Thelma Plum	21, 66
2	Doja Cat (Note: Once solo (22), once with Post Malone (51))	22, 51
2	Beyoncé	24, 42
2	Billie Eilish	32, 84
2	Bring Me the Horizon (Note: Once as a lead artist (38), once with Machine Gun Kelly (69))	38, 69
2	Drake (Note: Once as a lead artist (76), once with 21 Savage (44))	44, 76
2	21 Savage (Note: Once as a co-lead artist (44), once with Drake (76))	44, 76
2	Fisher	48, 68
2	Hilltop Hoods	54, 71
2	The 1975	58, 88
2	Arctic Monkeys	77, 79

=== Countries represented ===
Country	#
Australia	57
United States	28
United Kingdom	25
Canada	3
Ghana	2
Netherlands	2
Japan	1
Sweden	1
New Zealand	1
Germany	1
Italy	1

=== Records ===
- Flume is the second artist behind Powderfinger to win the Hottest 100 for a second time.
- With Hilltop Hoods being voted into the countdown twice, this marks their 22nd and 23rd appearances in a Hottest 100, overtaking Powderfinger and Foo Fighters' 22 appearances each to become the most featured artist in Hottest 100 history.
- With Spacey Jane having six tracks voted into the countdown, they match an annual record set by Wolfmother in the 2005 poll. The band becomes the fourth artist to place thrice in the top 10, following Powderfinger in 2003, Chet Faker in 2014, and Gang of Youths in 2017; and the eighth artist in the countdown's history to have two songs poll in the top 5.
- For the second year in a row, Spacey Jane finish third in the Hottest 100. Furthermore, Spacey Jane are the first artist to feature in the top 3 of a countdown for the third consecutive year. The previous record was two consecutive years held by The Cranberries (1993–94), Powderfinger (1999–2000), Kings of Leon (2007–08) and Flume (2019–20)
- Ten songs in the countdown were from First Nations artists, beating the previous record of six songs in the 2020 countdown.
- For the first time since 2017, Billie Eilish did not feature in the top 10.
- Seven previous winners of the Hottest 100 appeared in this year's countdown – Bernard Fanning (2005), Vance Joy (2013), The Rubens (2015), Flume (2016), Kendrick Lamar (2017), Ocean Alley (2018) & Billie Eilish (2019), equaling the record set in the previous year's countdown.

== 2022 Triple J Album Poll ==
Voting for the triple j Album Poll was held across November and December and was announced on 11 December 2022. Indie rock band Spacey Jane topped the poll for the second time, following their win with debut album Sunlight in 2020. Weirder & Weirder at second place and The Car at ninth mark both Ball Park Music's and Arctic Monkeys' seventh appearances each in the annual poll, with every prior studio album from both bands making an appearance in past polls.

Note: Australian artists

Bold indicates winner of the Hottest 100. Gang of Youths won the J Award for Angel in Realtime.

#	Artist	Album	Country of origin	Tracks in the Hottest 100
1	Spacey Jane	Here Comes Everybody	Australia	3, 5, 6, 25, 40, 75, (3, 12 in 2021)
2	Ball Park Music	Weirder & Weirder	Australia	8, (21 in 2021)
3	Gang of Youths	Angel in Realtime	Australia	9, (6, 57 in 2021)
4	Ocean Alley	Low Altitude Living	Australia	56, 59, 62, (20 in 2021)
5	King Stingray	King Stingray	Australia	27, 35, 94, (46, 56 in 2021)
6	Sly Withers	Overgrown	Australia	DNC (104 in Hottest 200)
7	Wet Leg	Wet Leg	United Kingdom	(45 in 2021) (115 in Hottest 200)
8	Daniel Johns	FutureNever	Australia	DNC (159 in Hottest 200)
9	Arctic Monkeys	The Car	United Kingdom	77, 79
10	Beddy Rays	Beddy Rays	Australia	83, (57 in 2020)
**11**	**Flume**	**Palaces**	**Australia**	**1**
12	The Wombats	Fix Yourself, Not the World	United Kingdom	82 (32 in 2021)
13	Steve Lacy	Gemini Rights	United States	4, 72
13	The 1975	Being Funny in a Foreign Language	United Kingdom	58, 88
15	Kendrick Lamar	Mr. Morale & the Big Steppers	United States	41
16	Slowly Slowly	Daisy Chain	Australia	(92 in 2021) (128 in Hottest 200)
17	Julia Jacklin	Pre Pleasure	Australia	DNC
18	Dope Lemon	Rose Pink Cadillac	Australia	(27 in 2021)
19	Vance Joy	In Our Own Sweet Time	Australia	29 (15 in 2021)
20	The Chats	Get Fucked	Australia	53
