= Hard light =

Hard light or hardlight may refer to:

- Hard and soft light in photography and filmmaking
- Hard light, an approach for computationally blending images
- A type of tactile hologram in science fiction
- Hardlight, a video game development studio acquired by Sega
- "Hardlight" (song), released in 2022 by indie rock band Spacey Jane
- Solid light, a theoretical state of light that is solid via strong interactions between photons
