= Here Comes Everybody (album) =

Studio album by Spacey Jane
- Released: 24 June 2022
- Recorded: 2021
- Studio: Empire, Brisbane; Blackbird Sound, Perth
- Genre: Indie rock
- Length: 43:28
- Label: AWAL
- Producer: Dave Parkin; Konstantin Kersting

Spacey Jane chronology
Sunlight (2020)	Here Comes Everybody (2022)	If That Makes Sense (2025)

Singles from Here Comes Everybody
- 1. "Lots of Nothing" Released: 24 June 2021; 2. "Lunchtime" Released: 7 October 2021; 3. "Sitting Up" Released: 10 February 2022; 4. "It's Been a Long Day" Released: 8 April 2022; 5. "Hardlight" Released: 19 May 2022; 6. "Pulling Through" Released: 20 June 2022

Deluxe cover

Singles from Here Comes Everybody (Deluxe)
- 1. "Lots of Nothing (feat. Benee)" Released: 10 January 2023; 2. "Sorry Instead" Released: 10 February 2023

Here Comes Everybody is the second studio album by Australian indie rock band Spacey Jane, released on 24 June 2022 via AWAL. Written through the onset of the COVID-19 pandemic, its pensive lyrics are reflective of anxieties at the time, and throughout the youth of frontman Caleb Harper. Produced mostly by Konstantin Kersting, Here Comes Everybody marks a sonic departure from their debut, Sunlight (2020).

Preceded by the double platinum lead single "Lots of Nothing", as well as five other singles which all had notable placements in the Triple J Hottest 100 of 2021 and 2022, Here Comes Everybody peaked at number one on the ARIA charts. The album's release was also supported by two Australian tours in March and August 2022 respectively, as well as a record store tour and an international circuit extending into 2023. At the 2022 ARIA Music Awards, Here Comes Everybody was nominated for Best Rock Album, and Australian Album of the Year at the J Awards. In 2024, the album was certified gold by the Australian Recording Industry Association for selling 35,000 units.

== Background ==
In June 2020, Spacey Jane released their debut studio album, Sunlight. It peaked at number two on the ARIA Albums chart and was supported by the Sunlight Tour from March 2021. The band's popularity grew throughout the year after their triple-platinum single "Booster Seat" polled at number two in the Triple J Hottest 100 of 2020. They signed to drummer Kieran Lama's new management company Anybody in February 2021, and renewed their global record deal with AWAL in June, with marketing director Ben Godding saying Spacey Jane were ready to "break through on a global scale", concluding "there's no better or bigger band in Australia right now".

== Production ==
Before Sunlight had released in June 2020, frontman Caleb Harper began writing material for the band's next album in spare time from COVID-19 tour cancellations. He later revealed that "the lack of touring could influence [the band's] new material", and that their future live performances would be "less of a rock show", instead being "the songs for what they are."

The album was almost completely written by January 2021, with some recording also done. By the end of March, Harper revealed to the Honi Soit that the band had almost finished tracking. On 9 August 2021, they revealed on social media that the album was fully recorded, and had been produced alongside Konstantin Kersting at Empire Studios, Brisbane. However, it was known at the time that the band weren't releasing it until at least 2022.

== Title and artwork ==
The album title, Here Comes Everybody, is taken from the working title of Wilco's 2002 album Yankee Hotel Foxtrot. Harper personally sought permission from Wilco frontman Jeff Tweedy to adopt the name, which "tied into what [he] wanted to talk about on the record". Wilco is one of Spacey Jane's biggest musical influences.

Perth photographer Matt Sav shot the album cover which features the four band members standing isolated on a sand dune. Harper originally wanted the image to feature "1000 people all the way up a sand dune, lit up by a flood light and fading into black", but this idea was too unrealistic. The cover for the deluxe edition is taken from the same shoot.

== Lyricism ==
When writing for the album, Harper took a less introspective approach to his lyricism. In comparison to Sunlight, which deeply discusses his personal experiences, Here Comes Everybody is written from a generational perspective, and aims to capture "a collective experience of anxiety and uncertainty."

Harper explained "Lots of Nothing" is written about "trying to accept all the parts of yourself, good and bad, before you are able to work on the person that you want to become". He admitted in an interview with Apple Music that depression as a lyrical theme runs throughout "half of the album", particularly in tracks like "Clean My Car" and "Haircut" – the latter using personal anecdote to explain things the frontman did to "reinvent myself and pull myself out of a state of mind after a breakup". Similarly, "It's Been a Long Day", one of the record's most sonically desolate tracks, follows Harper's emotions falling in and out of a relationship and battles with depersonalisation. The song closes with Harper's admission that "I really loved you".

"Lunchtime" was written as Harper was experiencing "severe hangover anxiety and feeling extremely hopeless", with the track's fast and upbeat instrumentation directly contradicting the "somber lyrics and themes". "Head Above" concerns Harper's broken relationship with his parents, and leaving home at the age of 17. Closing tracks "Yet" and "Pulling Through" are relatively "hopeful", with Harper saying that "after all these stories and experiences I've had, it's gonna be OK".

== Release and promotion ==
The lead single "Lots of Nothing" was first performed at the Fremantle Arts Centre during the band's Sunlight Tour. It was officially released on 24 June 2021 alongside a music video. The second single "Lunchtime" was issued on 7 October 2021. In November, Spacey Jane appeared on ABC's music programme The Sound to perform the song live from Red Hill Auditorium in Western Australia. These two singles held notable positions in the Triple J Hottest 100 of 2021, with "Lots of Nothing" at number three and "Lunchtime" at number 12.

The album's title, track listing and initial release date was officially announced on 10 February 2022, alongside the release of third single "Sitting Up". The band embarked on an Australian pre-release album tour in March 2022. A fourth single, "It's Been a Long Day", was released in April, with "Hardlight" following in May. Originally slated for a release on 10 June 2022, the album was delayed by two weeks due to vinyl production delays. In the meantime, a sixth and final single, "Pulling Through", was issued.

On 24 June 2022, Here Comes Everybody was released. In the following week, Spacey Jane embarked on a national record store tour. The album peaked at number one on the ARIA Albums chart on 1 July.

The international Here Comes Everybody Tour lasted from July 2022 to February 2023. The band played 17 shows in Australia and New Zealand from July to August 2022, with support acts Teenage Dads and I Know Leopard. From October to November 2022, they played 24 shows in North America. It was the band's first time touring there, with its leg being postponed numerous times due to visa complications and travel restrictions amidst the COVID-19 pandemic. In February 2023, the tour concluded with 13 shows across Europe.

Following the Triple J Hottest 100 of 2022, Here Comes Everybody equaled the record for most songs off a single album to enter the Hottest 100, with eight tracks in total spanning the 2021 and 2022 countdowns. In the latter, "Hardlight" placed at number three, followed by "It's Been a Long Day" and "Sitting Up" at number five and six respectively. They had three other polling songs that year.

On 10 February 2023, Spacey Jane digitally released a deluxe version of the album, featuring two unreleased studio tracks, a live performance of "Hardlight" from their first arena show, and a previously issued remix of "Lots of Nothing" featuring New Zealand artist Benee.

== Critical reception ==
Professional ratings
Review scores
Source	Rating
The AU Review	3.5/5 stars
The Australian	4/5 stars
Clash	7/10
The Guardian	2/5 stars
NME	4/5 stars
Rolling Stone Australia	3.5/5 stars

Writing for NME, Caleb Triscari wrote the album offered "promising development from Spacey Jane", praising Harper for the fuller use of his vocal range, and the improved instrumentation compared to the band's debut. However, Triscari was critical about the band's reliance on the "verse-chorus structure", and also hoped their future work would explore more original themes.

Shaad D'Souza for The Guardian gave the album a negative review, calling it "painfully sophomoric indie rock". He claimed the songwriting was uninspired, unmemorable, and that "musically, it sounds like so many other records released by Australian indie bands in the past decade". Conversely, Mitch Mosk of Atwood Magazine praised its relatable lyrics, concluding "Here Comes Everybody is unapologetically dynamic and charismatically passionate".

At the 2022 ARIA Music Awards, the album was nominated for Best Rock Album, and Australian Album of the Year at the J Awards.

== Track listing ==
All tracks written by Ashton Hardman-Le Cornu, Caleb Harper, Kieran Lama, and Peppa Lane; deluxe track 13 co-written by Benee.

Here Comes Everybody track listing
No.	Title	Producer	Length
1.	"Sitting Up"	Konstantin Kersting	3:12
2.	"Lunchtime"	Dave Parkin	3:18
3.	"Lots of Nothing"	Parkin	3:16
4.	"Clean My Car"	Kersting	3:20
5.	"Hardlight"	Kersting	3:40
6.	"It's Been a Long Day"	Parkin	4:08
7.	"Bothers Me"	Kersting	3:17
8.	"Not What You Paid For"	Kersting	4:21
9.	"Haircut"	Kersting	3:44
10.	"Head Above"	Kersting	3:38
11.	"Yet"	Kersting	3:27
12.	"Pulling Through"	Parkin	3:58
Total length:			43:28

Here Comes Everybody (Deluxe) track listing
No.	Title	Producer	Length
13.	"Lots of Nothing" (featuring Benee)	Parkin; Kersting	3:13
14.	"Sorry Instead"	Kersting	3:19
15.	"Is This What You Wanted"	Kersting	3:12
16.	"Hardlight" (live at RAC Arena, Perth, August 2022)	Hardman-Le Cornu; Harper; Lama; Lane	4:12
Total length:			56:51

== Personnel ==
Spacey Jane

- Caleb Harper – vocals, guitar, writing
- Ashton Hardman-Le Cornu – lead guitar, backing vocals, writing
- Kieran Lama – drums, writing
- Peppa Lane – bass guitar, backing vocals, writing

Additional personnel

- Dave Parkin – producer (tracks 2–3, 6, 12), mixing (track 3), engineer
- Konstantin Kersting – producer, engineer (tracks 1, 4–5, 7–11)
- Rich Costey – mixing (tracks 1–2, 4–12)
- Jeff Citron – mix assistant (tracks 1–2, 4–12)
- Brian Lucey – mastering
- Matt Sav – photography
- Gesture Systems – design

== Charts ==
=== Weekly charts ===
Weekly chart performance for Here Comes Everybody
Chart (2022)	Peak position
Australian Albums (ARIA)	1

=== Year-end charts ===
2022 year-end chart performance for Here Comes Everybody
Chart (2022)	Position
Australian Albums (ARIA)	45

2023 year-end chart performance for Here Comes Everybody
Chart (2023)	Position
Australian Albums (ARIA)	87

== Certifications ==
Certifications for Here Comes Everybody
Region	Certification	Certified units/sales
Australia (ARIA)	Gold	35,000^{‡}
^{‡} Sales+streaming figures based on certification alone.

== Release history ==
Release dates and formats for Here Comes Everybody
Region	Date	Version	Format	Catalogue	Label	Ref.
Various	24 February 2022	Standard	Cassette; CD; digital download; streaming; vinyl LP	SPACJ008	AWAL	
Australia	24 February 2022	Standard	LP (various limited edition versions)	SPACJ008	AWAL	
Various	10 February 2023	Deluxe	Digital download; streaming	N/A	AWAL	
