= Good for You (Spacey Jane song) =

2019 single by Spacey Jane

Single by Spacey Jane

from the album Sunlight
- Released: 15 August 2019
- Studio: Blackbird Sound, Perth
- Genre: Indie rock
- Length: 2:54
- Songwriters: Amelia Murray; Ashton Hardman-Le Cornu; Caleb Harper; Kieran Lama
- Producer: Dave Parkin

Spacey Jane singles chronology
"Good Grief" (2019)	"Good for You" (2019)	"Head Cold" (2019)

Music video
- "Good for You" on YouTube

"Good for You" is a song by Australian indie rock band Spacey Jane, released on 15 August 2019 as the second single to their debut studio album, Sunlight (2020). It is a guitar-heavy uptempo song that lyrically discusses self-worth amidst a broken relationship, and serves as the album's opening track. It polled at number 80 in the Triple J Hottest 100 of 2019, and was nominated for Most Performed Rock Work at the 2021 APRA Awards. In 2024, "Good for You" was certified 2× platinum by the Australian Recording Industry Association (ARIA) for selling 140,000 units.

== Composition ==
When writing "Good for You", Spacey Jane composed almost 10 revisions of its melodies and lyrics, although their producer Dave Parkin, who had worked with the band on their previous two extended plays, opted to not use the final alteration. Lyrically, frontman Caleb Harper said the track "comes off the back of a few failed romantic relationships". In an interview with Apple Music, he elaborated:

[B]ecause of my own faults and feelings, and because of things like depression, I'm not being the best person for my partner, and she knows it as well. I'm hoping that I could be better, but there's no real timeline on that.

Originally titled "Sleeping Rough", "Good for You" features "thick guitar rhythms and lush vocals," with Hayden Davies of music publication Pilerats saying the track balances its "catchy hooks" with "head-turning, sun-soaked melodies". It was recorded and produced by Dave Parkin at Blackbird Sound Studio in Perth, and mastered at King Willy Sound in Tasmania.

== Release and promotion ==
On 15 August 2019, "Good for You" was released as the second single to Spacey Jane's then-untitled debut studio album. The track was issued alongside a music video directed by Matt Sav which features the band members "playing and doing some odd things with an overall retro video vibe." In September 2019, the band embarked on the Good for You Tour across 11 shows.

In the Triple J Hottest 100 of 2019, "Good for You" polled at number 80, marking the band's first appearance in the annual countdown. Drummer Kieran Lama admitted the band had lost hope in making the list, saying Harper had "psyched [himself] out of it in the days leading up to prepare for the heartbreak".

== Legacy ==
The song's placement in the Hottest 100, which Lama called a "landmark moment", directly preceded the band's rise in popularity. Upon the track's release, Davies of Pilerats wrote that "'Good For You' is another marker that shows Spacey Jane's potential to be our next big national export." Following the countdown, Declan Byrne of Triple J said their placement was a "big milestone for a band who you'll be hearing plenty more of in years to come". At the end of 2020, their debut album Sunlight topped the station's annual listener poll.

"Good for You" remains a mainstay on Spacey Jane's set lists. In 2020, Harper said the track was "easily the most fun for [them] to play live and [was] currently closing out the set."

In 2024, the track was certified 2× platinum by the Australian Recording Industry Association (ARIA) for selling 140,000 units.

== Certifications ==
Certifications for "Good for You"
Region	Certification	Certified units/sales
Australia (ARIA)	2× Platinum	140,000^{‡}
New Zealand (RMNZ)	Gold	15,000^{‡}
^{‡} Sales+streaming figures based on certification alone.
