= Lots of Nothing =

2021 single by Spacey Jane

Single by Spacey Jane

from the album Here Comes Everybody
- Written: 2020
- Released: 24 June 2021
- Genre: Indie rock
- Length: 3:16
- Label: AWAL
- Songwriters: Caleb Harper; Ashton Hardman-Le Cornu; Kieran Lama; Peppa Lane
- Producer: Dave Parkin

Spacey Jane singles chronology
"Booster Seat" (2020)	"Lots of Nothing" (2021)	"Lunchtime" (2021)

Music video
- "Lots of Nothing" on YouTube

"Lots of Nothing" is a song by Australian indie rock band Spacey Jane, released through AWAL on 24 June 2021 as the lead single from their forthcoming second studio album Here Comes Everybody (2022).

"Lots of Nothing" peaked at number 34 on the ARIA Singles Chart, number 36 on the NZ Top 40 Hot Singles Chart, was ranked at number 3 on Australian national youth broadcaster Triple J's Hottest 100 of 2021, and was nominated for Most Performed Rock Work at the 2022 APRA Awards. A remix of the song featuring Benee was released on 10 January 2023. In 2024, "Lots of Nothing" was certified 2× platinum by the Australian Recording Industry Association for selling 140,000 units.

== Background ==
On 8 June 2020, frontman Caleb Harper revealed that they had almost finished writing their second album. On 16 June 2021, the band renewed their global record deal with AWAL.

Spacey Jane debuted "Lots of Nothing" during a performance at the Fremantle Arts Centre on their Sunlight Tour on 5 May 2021. During a concert at the Enmore Theatre in Sydney on 2 June, the band revealed that they would release new music "next month". On 24 June, Harper appeared on Triple J's Breakfast program Bryce & Ebony, where he premiered the song, which was the band's first release since releasing their widely acclaimed debut album, Sunlight (2020). "Lots of Nothing" was released later that day, as the lead single from their second studio album.

== Recording ==
Written and performed by the band's four members—Caleb Harper, Ashton Hardman-Le Cornu, Kieran Lama and Peppa Lane—"Lots of Nothing" was recorded and mixed by Dave Parkin at Blackbird Sound Studio, and mastered by Brian Lucey at Magic Garden Mastering. The song was written during a break from touring, which occurred as a result of the impact of the COVID-19 pandemic on the music industry.

== Composition ==
Caleb Harper, the band's frontman, described "Lots of Nothing" as being about "wrestling with the parts of yourself that you don't like and how you can see those traits as a whole other person. It's about trying to accept all the parts of yourself, good and bad, before you are able to work on the person that you want to become."

Musically, "Lots of Nothing" is an indie rock song "filled with energetic drums and guitar riffs", with an "aching, yet catchy [chorus]. Tina Benitez-Eves of American Songwriter wrote that the song "continue[s] [the band's] narrative around the complexities of relationships and struggling with mental health, through a more innocent lens." Arun Kendall of Backseat Mafia stated the track to be "a blissed out jangling sparkling beauty of a track filled with yearning and vulnerability."

== Critical reception ==
Dave Bruce of Amnplify said "the single stands true to [the band]'s trademark catchy yet lyrically deep musical offerings." Arun Kendall of Backseat Mafia commended the song, saying it has "ranging expansive melodies and expressive singing [which] are carried by a bedrock of muted guitars and scaling instrumental layers that ascend to celestial heights as the song builds." Nathan Jolly of Guardian Australia wrote "this song becomes the song that shoots you back that [to] one perfect moment." He also felt that the song was evidence of "Caleb Harper's voice [having] accumulated more grit since [their debut album]." Alex Gallagher of Music Feeds felt that the song "[paired] an effervescent musical buoyancy and shimmering melodies with considered, introspective lyricism." Milky applauded the band for "continue[ing] their brand of catch indie-rock sonics, paired with introspective and deep lyricism." Chastity Hale of NPR praised the song, saying "listening to "Lots of Nothing" feels like rediscovering the best summer of your youth." Hayden Davies of Pilerats believed the song "[captured] Spacey Jane's jagged indie-rock instrumentation at a newfound peak" and likened it to Car Seat Headrest. Simon Collins of PerthNow labelled the track "infectious". Aarushi Nanda of Riff Magazine appreciated the song's "nostalgic, comforting quality... with guitar riffs that are reminiscent of summer". Annabel Kean of Under the Radar called it a "searing new track".

=== Accolades ===
"Lots of Nothing" polled at number 3 on Australian national youth broadcaster Triple J's Hottest 100 of 2021. At the 2022 APRA Awards, it was nominated for Most Performed Rock Work.

== Commercial performance ==
On 10 July 2021, "Lots of Nothing" was one of MTV Australia's playlist additions for that week.

In Australia, "Lots of Nothing" debuted at number 14 on the ARIA Top 20 Australian Singles Chart, before falling out the following week. On 26 January 2021, Australian Recording Industry Association (ARIA) published their mid-week chart, in which they revealed the song was likely to make its debut on the ARIA Singles Chart that week. On 28 January, it debuted at number 34 on the ARIA Singles Chart for the chart dated 31 January, becoming their second Top 50 entry in their home country, after "Booster Seat" achieved the same feat in 2020. The song dropped into the lower fifty one week later.

In New Zealand, "Lots of Nothing" debuted at number 36 on the NZ Top 40 Hot Singles Chart for the chart dated 5 July 2021, before falling out the following week.

By 14 October 2021, "Lots of Nothing" had accumulated more than 3 million streams on Spotify.

== Live performances ==
On 5 May 2021, Spacey Jane debuted "Lots of Nothing" during a performance at the Fremantle Arts Centre on their Sunlight Tour. On 2 August, they released official footage of a live performance of the song, which was recorded at the Enmore Theatre, Sydney, between 25 May and 2 June that year during the same tour.

== Music video ==
The official music video, directed by Matt Sav, premiered alongside the single's release on 24 June 2021. The video, filmed in a hostel in Fremantle, Western Australia, depicts the band walking through a house whilst performing the song. Annabel Kean of Under the Radar felt the video "shows the charming young rockers playing their hearts out and looking gorgeous on film in a house decked out with healthy pot plants and lush bouquets."

== Charts ==
=== Weekly charts ===
Chart performance for "Lots of Nothing"
Chart (2021–2022)	Peak position
Australia (ARIA)	34
New Zealand Hot Singles (RMNZ)	36

=== Year-end charts ===
Year-end chart performance for "Lots of Nothing"
Chart (2022)	Position
Australian Artist (ARIA)	44

== Certifications ==
Certifications for "Lots of Nothing"
Region	Certification	Certified units/sales
Australia (ARIA)	3× Platinum	210,000^{‡}
New Zealand (RMNZ)	Gold	15,000^{‡}
^{‡} Sales+streaming figures based on certification alone.

== Benee version ==
"Lots of Nothing (feat. Benee)"

Single by Spacey Jane and Benee
- Released: 10 January 2023
- Genre: Indie rock
- Length: 3:14
- Label: AWAL
- Songwriters: Caleb Harper; Ashton Hardman-Le Cornu; Kieran Lama; Peppa Lane; Stella Rose Bennett
- Producers: Dave Parkin; Konstantin Kersting

Spacey Jane singles chronology
"Pulling Through" (2022)	"Lots of Nothing (feat. Benee)" (2023)	"Sorry Instead" (2023)

Benee singles chronology
"I'm So Happy (feat. Benee)" (2022)	"Lots of Nothing (feat. Benee)" (2023)	"Green Honda" (2023)

On 10 January 2022, Spacey Jane released a remix of "Lots of Nothing" featuring New Zealand singer Benee. It is the band's first track with a featured artist. Upon release, Harper wrote: "It's so cool to see a song that I wrote over two years ago have new life breathed into it like this". Musically, the track features Benee performing one verse herself, and providing background vocals in the original's first verse, chorus and bridge.

== Release history ==
Release dates and formats for "Lots of Nothing"
Region	Version	Date	Format	Label	Ref.
Various	Original	24 June 2021	Digital download; streaming	Spacey Jane; AWAL	
Various	Remix	10 January 2022	Digital download; streaming	Spacey Jane; AWAL	
