= Dice (Australian band) =

Australian band

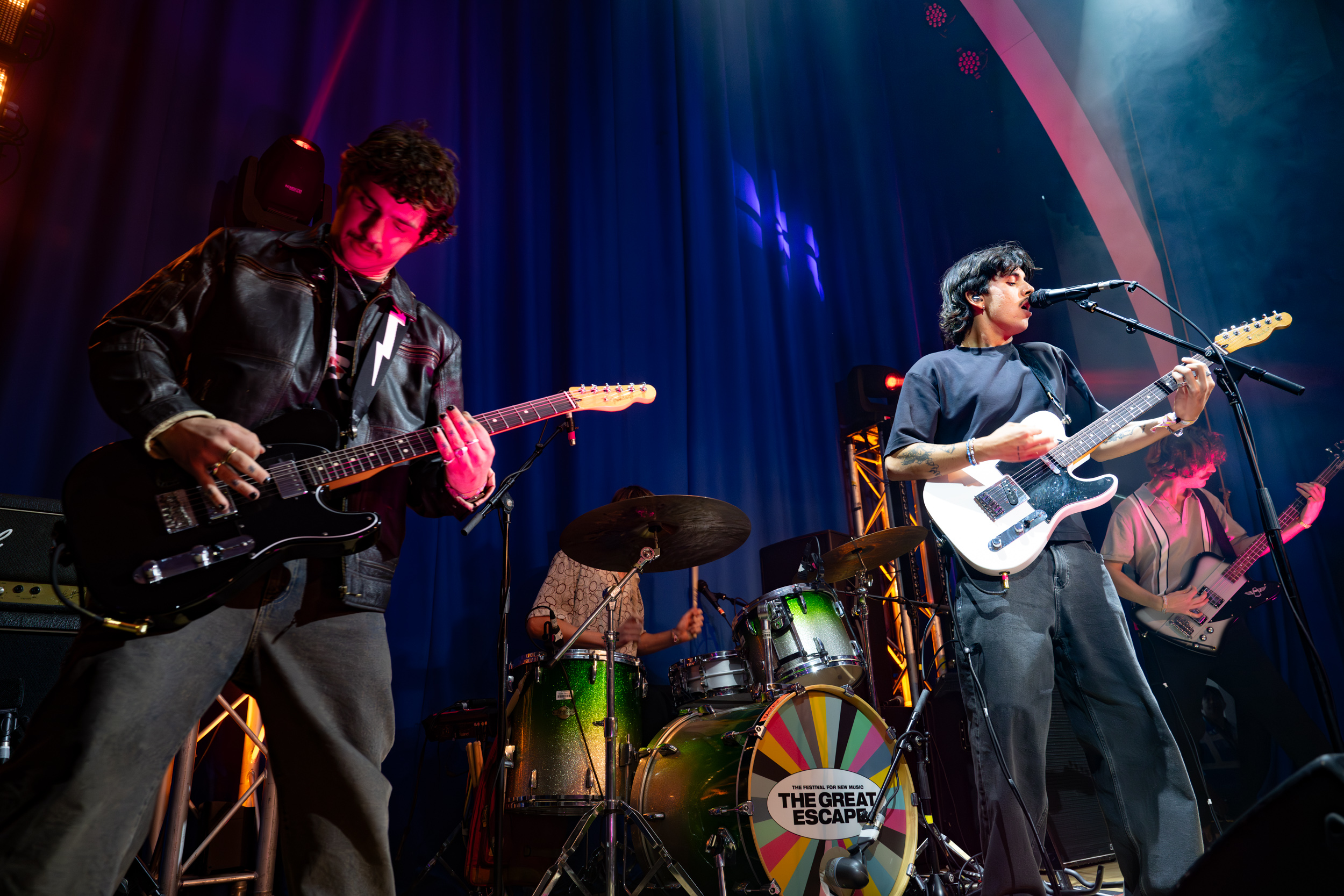
- Dice at The Great Escape Festival 2025

Background information
- Origin: Perth, Australia
- Genre: Indie rock
- Years active: 2020–present
- Label: Independent
- Members: Ben Hodge; Sam Barrett-Lennard; Tom King; Regan Beazley
- Website: dice.komi.io

Dice (stylised in all caps) is an indie rock group from Perth, Western Australia. Formed in 2020, the band consists of Ben Hodge (vocals, guitar), Sam Barrett-Lennard (drums), Tom King (lead guitar), and Regan Beazley (bass).

They released their debut studio album Midnight Zoo in August 2024.

== Career ==
=== Early years ===
Dice formed in 2020 and emerged on the Perth music scene in 2021, quickly gaining attention with their energetic live performances. Their early success was bolstered by significant airplay on Triple J, Australia's leading youth radio station. They were featured as a Triple J Unearthed artist in 2022.

In May 2023, Dice released their sophomore EP, Time Will Tell. The EP received extensive airplay on Triple J and featured the singles "Quick to Judge" and "Double Espresso".

In 2024, Dice embarked on their Quick to Judge national tour, performing in both regional areas and major cities across Australia.

The band has also performed at major festivals such as Groovin' the Moo and Splendour in the Grass. They were also part of the Yours & Owls Festival lineup.

=== Musical Style and Influence ===
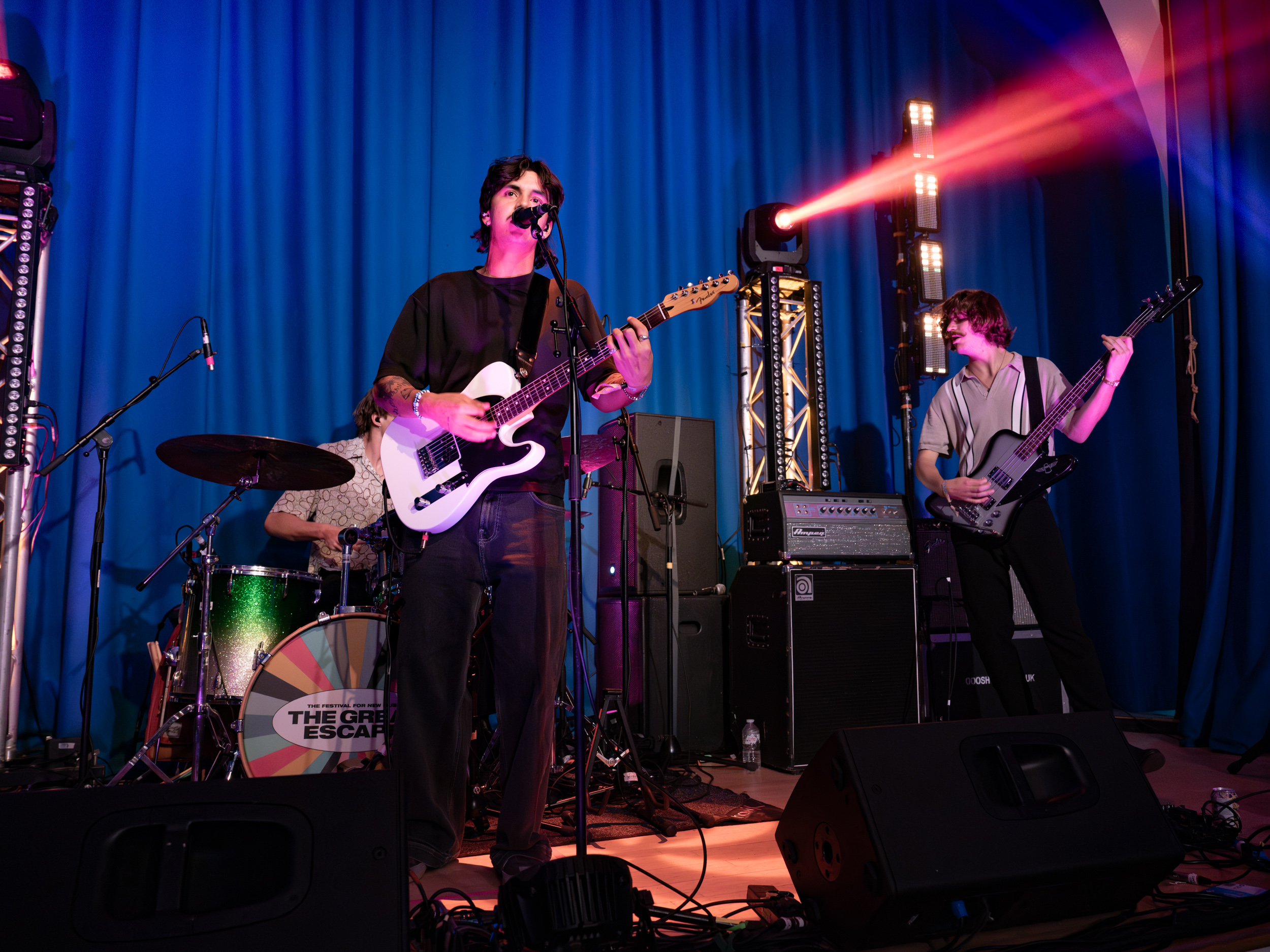
Ben Hodge & Regan Beazley in May 2025

Their music features catchy, sun-soaked melodies with introspective lyrics. Their single "Quick To Judge" exemplifies their approach, blending intimate themes with energetic instrumentation. The band cites influences like Spacey Jane and has been compared to Arctic Monkeys in terms of their sound and appeal. The band has also shared interesting and quirky facts about themselves, enhancing their connection with fans.

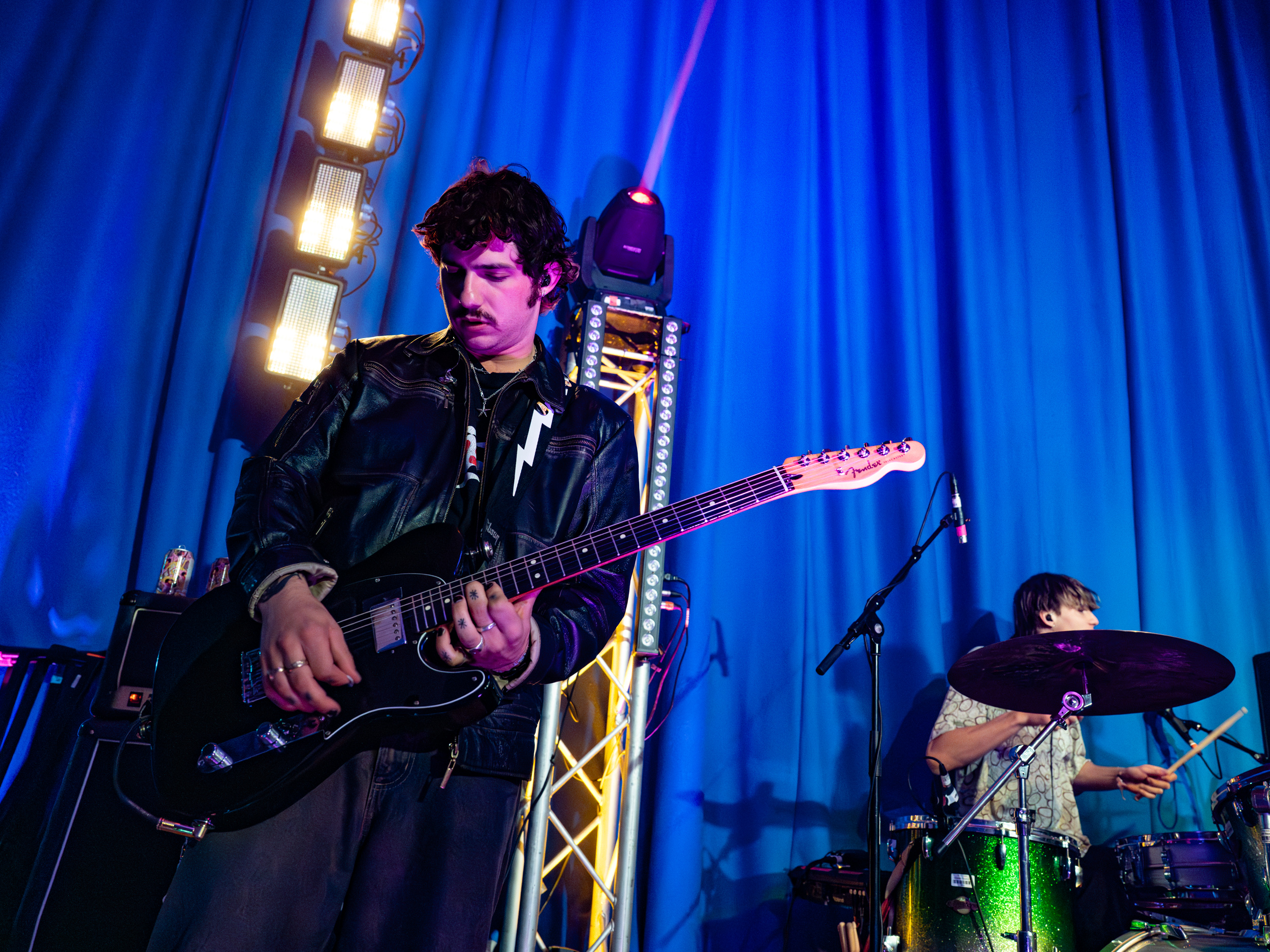
Tom King & Sam Barrett Lennard in May 2025

== Members ==
- Ben Hodge – vocals, guitar
- Sam Barrett-Lennard – drums
- Tom King – lead guitar
- Regan Beazley – bass

== Discography ==
=== Studio albums ===
List of studio albums, with release date, label, and selected chart positions shown
Title	Album details	Peak chart positions
Title	Album details	AUS
Midnight Zoo	Released: 9 August 2024; Label: VMG/UMA (64183789997)	27
I Thought the Altitude Would Make It Worth the View	Released: 30 July 2026; Label: VMG/UMA (DICELP2)	13

=== Extended plays ===
List of EPs, with selected details
Title	Details
Adolescent Arcade	Released: 1 April 2022; Label: Dice The Band Oz
Time Will Tell	Released: 5 May 2023; Label: Dice The Band Oz
Wings	Released: 26 September 2025; Label: Tone City Records
