= In the Slight =

EP by Spacey Jane
- Released: 10 November 2018
- Recorded: April–November 2018
- Studio: King Willy Sound, Tasmania; Poons Head, Fremantle; Blackbird, Perth
- Genre: Indie rock; folk-pop
- Length: 19:08
- Producer: Dave Parkin (Note: Tracks 2, 3); Rob Grant; (Note: Tracks 1, 4–6)

Spacey Jane chronology
| No Way to Treat an Animal (2017) | In the Slight (2018) | Sunlight (2020) |

Singles from In the Slight
- 1. "Cold Feet" Released: 17 August 2018; 2. "Keep a Clean Nose" Released: 12 October 2018

In the Slight is the second extended play (EP) by Australian indie rock band Spacey Jane, released independently on 10 November 2018.

Produced by Rob Grant and Dave Parkin, In the Slight was preceded by two singles—"Cold Feet" and "Keep a Clean Nose"—and was supported by a national tour from March 2019.

In the Slight marked a departure from the garage rock sound of their debut EP No Way to Treat an Animal (2017), transitioning to indie rock and folk-pop, with elements of shoegaze, a style which they continued to explore on their subsequent debut studio album, Sunlight (2020).

== Background and release ==
In 2017, Spacey Jane released their debut EP, No Way to Treat an Animal. On 16 April 2018, the band released a dual single, entitled In the Meantime, which featured the tracks "Old Enough" and "So You Wanna".

The lead single "Cold Feet" was released alongside a launch at Badlands Bar, Perth, Western Australia on 13 August 2018. "Keep a Clean Nose" followed on 12 October as the second single, accompanied by a music video directed by George Foster. The band held a launch party for the EP at the Rosemount Hotel in Perth on 10 November, the day of release, before embarking on the In the Slight Australian Tour in March 2019.

As with the band's previous releases, the cover artwork was designed by artist Alice Ford. Harper explained that the title of the EP "came from emotions and intuitions that come out in one moment or second, unable to really be fully experienced again."

== Writing and production ==
All five tracks on the EP were written by three of the band's four members—Caleb Harper, Ashton Hardman-Le Cornu, and Kieran Lama. Its sound marks a departure from No Way to Treat an Animal, a "garage-pop EP. Instead, In the Slight has been described by Ali Shutler of NME as dabbling "with folk, emo and the decadence of '00s indie."

Describing his writing process, Harper admitted in an interview with the Geraldton Guardian that occasionally "there’s a bit of gibberish" in his lyrics. "Cold Feet" was written about his worry that an ex-lover moving the country would never come back to Australia. Le Cornu admitted the band had "gained a lot of maturity in the songwriting from the first to the second EP". Harper continued, in a press release:

I definitely think we focussed a lot more heavily on the dynamic between our guitars and playing off each other. On the first EP we were really just playing lots of guitar, always, and we learnt to step back a little bit and try and work with each other better.

Pilerats' Hayden Davies observed that the EP's "dreamy shoegaze" tracks explored "every facet and groove of their summery, guitar-backed pop sound." His colleague Jacob Steenson specifically praised "Cold Feet" for its "engaging lyrics amidst just a damn fine slice of jangly indie-pop." "Sawteeth", the third track, was praised by Kaya Selin of the BackBeat Podcast for being notably "melancholic", with its "pensive lyricism making it a stand-out from the rest". Writing for Sacred Exile, Brandon Sims noted that "Keep a Clean Nose" and "Neoprene" "help show off Harper's talent by giving the vocals a bit more focus," and cited the Strokes and the Cure as noticeable influences in the release.

== Track listing ==
All tracks are written by Caleb Harper, Ashton Hardman-Le Cornu, and Kieran Lama.

In the Slight track listing
| No. | Title | Producer | Length |
|---|---|---|---|
| 1. | "Cold Feet" | Rob Grant | 4:04 |
| 2. | "Balmy" | Dave Parkin | 3:09 |
| 3. | "Sawteeth" | Parkin | 4:00 |
| 4. | "Keep a Clean Nose" | Grant | 3:42 |
| 5. | "Neoprene" | Grant | 4:12 |
| Total length: | | | 19:08 |

== Personnel ==
Spacey Jane:

- Caleb Harper – lead vocals, guitar, writing (all tracks)
- Ashton Hardman-Le Cornu – lead guitar, writing (all tracks)
- Amelia Murray – bass guitar, backing vocals (all tracks)
- Kieran Lama – drums, writing (all tracks)

=== Additional personnel ===
- Dave Parkin – production, mixing (2–3)
- Rob Grant – production, mixing (1, 4–5), mastering (1, 4)
- Will Bowden – mastering (2–3, 5)
- Alice Ford – cover artwork

== Release history ==
In the Slight release history and formats
| Date | Region(s) | Format(s) | Label(s) | Catalogue | Ref. |
|---|---|---|---|---|---|
| 10 November 2018 | Various | Digital download; streaming | Spacey Jane (independent) | Not applicable | |
| 27 November 2020 | Australia | LP | Spacey Jane (independent) | SPACJ006LP | |
| 21 January 2021 | Australia | LP | Spacey Jane (independent) | SPACJ006LP | |
