= It's Been a Long Day =

2022 single by Spacey Jane

Single by Spacey Jane

from the album Here Comes Everybody
- Written: 2020
- Released: 8 April 2022
- Studio: Empire, Brisbane
- Length: 4:04
- Label: AWAL
- Songwriters: Caleb Harper; Ashton Hardman-Le Cornu; Kieran Lama; Peppa Lane
- Producer: Dave Parkin

Spacey Jane singles chronology
"Sitting Up" (2022)	"It's Been a Long Day" (2022)	"Hardlight" (2022)

Music video
- "It's Been a Long Day" on YouTube

"It's Been a Long Day" is a song by Australian indie rock band Spacey Jane, released on 8 April 2022 as the fourth single to their second studio album, Here Comes Everybody (2022). It peaked at number 79 on the ARIA Singles Chart and number 26 on the New Zealand Hot Singles chart. In the Triple J Hottest 100 of 2022, the song polled at number five. In 2024, "It's Been a Long Day" was certified gold by the Australian Recording Industry Association for selling 35,000 units.

== Composition ==
Spacey Jane frontman Caleb Harper wrote "It's Been a Long Day" before and after breaking up with a partner in 2020. He wrote the song to admit that he really did love her, but was too anxious and overwhelmed throughout the COVID-19 pandemic to tell her directly.

Described as a melancholic ballad, "It's Been a Long Day" is sonically desolate and contrasts their previous, guitar-heavy work. According to Anna Rose of NME, it begins with "a contemplative acoustic guitar" that is gradually "joined by a swaying bass and piercing drums". Writing for Triple J, Al Newstead said the track shows the band "leaning into their more thoughtful and reflective side". Harper's vocals were described as angelic by Veronica Zurzola of Pilerats.

== Release ==
On 8 April 2022, "It's Been a Long Day" was released as the fourth single to the band's second studio album, Here Comes Everybody. It was issued alongside a music video directed by Serena Reynolds and starring Sarah Pidgeon, filmed in Los Feliz, Los Angeles.

In the Triple J Hottest 100 of 2022, the track polled at number five, directly following "Sitting Up" at number six. Spacey Jane had three songs in the top ten alone, with "Hardlight" highest placed at number three.

== Live performances ==
While touring at Melbourne venue Forum Theatre, the band recorded a suite of acoustic performances of songs from Here Comes Everybody, including a rendition of "It's Been a Long Day" released in November 2022. The recording features only Harper and lead guitarist Ashton Hardman Le-Cornu.

== Charts ==
Chart (2022)	Peak position
Australia (ARIA)	79
New Zealand Hot Singles (RMNZ)	26

== Certifications ==
Certifications for It's Been a Long Day"
Region	Certification	Certified units/sales
Australia (ARIA)	Gold	35,000^{‡}
^{‡} Sales+streaming figures based on certification alone.
