= Spacey Jane =

Australian indie rock band

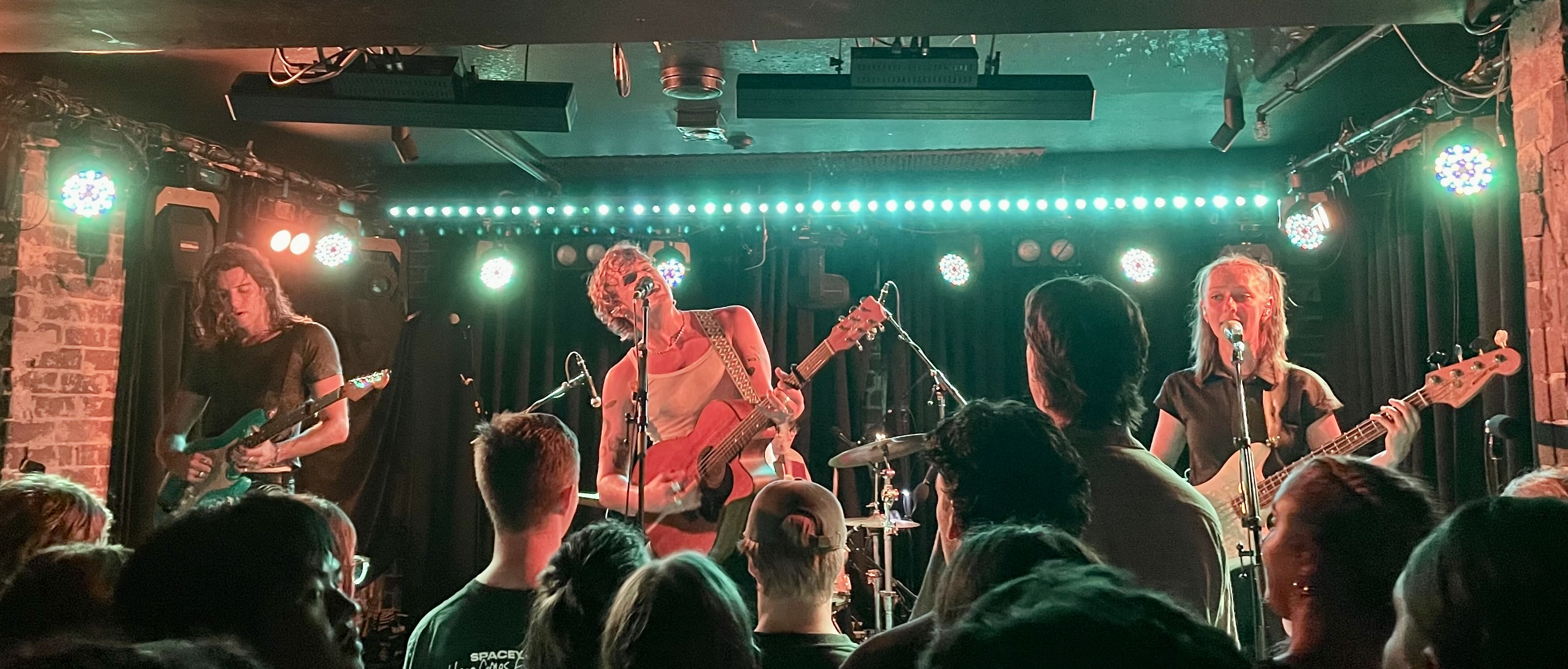
- Spacey Jane performing in Sydney, 2025.

Background information
- Origin: Fremantle, Western Australia, Australia
- Genres: Indie rock; garage rock
- Works: Spacey Jane discography
- Years active: 2016–present
- Labels: AWAL; Concord
- Members: Ashton Hardman-Le Cornu; Caleb Harper; Kieran Lama; Peppa Lane
- Past members: Amelia Murray
- Website: spaceyjane.com.au

Spacey Jane are an Australian indie rock band formed in Fremantle in 2016. The group consists of lead vocalist and guitarist Caleb Harper, lead guitarist Ashton Hardman-Le Cornu, drummer Kieran Lama and bassist Peppa Lane.

In 2017, the band released their debut extended play, No Way to Treat an Animal, supported by their breakout single "Feeding the Family". Their sound developed from garage to indie rock for their next EP, In the Slight (2018). Spacey Jane's debut album, Sunlight, was released in 2020 and peaked at number two on the ARIA Charts. It includes "Booster Seat", which won the ARIA Award for Song of the Year and placed number two in the 2020 Triple J Hottest 100; it has become the band's signature song, achieving 7× platinum certification.

The band released their second album, Here Comes Everybody, in 2022, supported by the successful singles "Lots of Nothing" and "Hardlight", and six placements in the 2022 Hottest 100. In May 2025, they released their third album, If That Makes Sense. In June 2026, they released the EP Exit Wounds.

== History ==
=== 2016–2018: Formation and early releases ===
Singer and guitarist Caleb Harper and drummer Kieran Lama met at high school in Geraldton, Western Australia. Lama, initially from Wimmera, Victoria, moved west when he was 14. The two played together in a grunge band called Sicchino, and would upload music to Triple J Unearthed. By 2015, they moved to Perth and were studying at the University of Western Australia, where they met guitarist Ashton Hardman-Le Cornu and bassist Amelia Murray from Tincurrin. The name Spacey Jane was decided upon hastily, and is derived from the name of Lama's housemate, Jane. In 2016, unsure of how to book a proper venue, the four played their first show in Harper's dad's backyard to around 300 people.

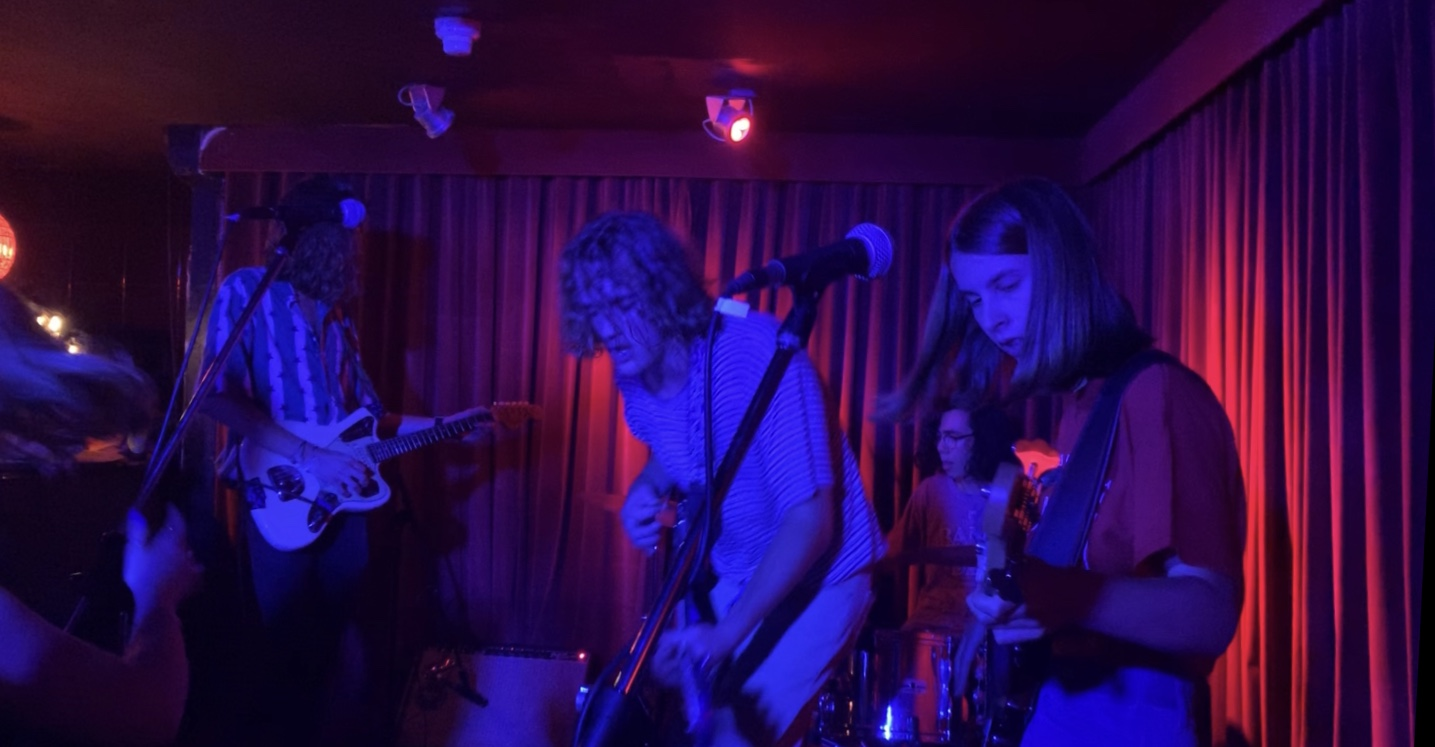
Spacey Jane performing in Sydney, 2018.

The band would play one or two local shows "every week for a good year and a half", and sometimes two shows per night. Their debut single "Still Running" was a re-recorded Sicchino original, released in August 2017. Spacey Jane received airplay on Perth station RTRFM with their second single "Feeding the Family", a track that has been credited for the band's breakout success. In November 2017, Spacey Jane released their six-track debut extended play (EP), No Way to Treat an Animal. It peaked at number 23 on the ARIA Albums Chart in December 2020.

On 16 April 2018, the band released a dual single titled In the Meantime, featuring the songs "Old Enough" and "So You Wanna". Its sound was noted as being brighter and poppier than that of their EP. Spacey Jane's second EP, In the Slight, was issued on 9 November 2018 with five tracks, including two singles. After winning the Triple J Unearthed Falls competition, the band performed at Falls Festival 2018.

=== 2019–2020: Sunlight and breakout success ===
Preparing for the release of their first studio album, Spacey Jane released the lead single "Good Grief" on 24 April 2019 and toured Australia through May. "Good for You" was the second single and went on to poll at number 80 in the 2019 Triple J Hottest 100, marking the band's first appearance in the annual countdown.

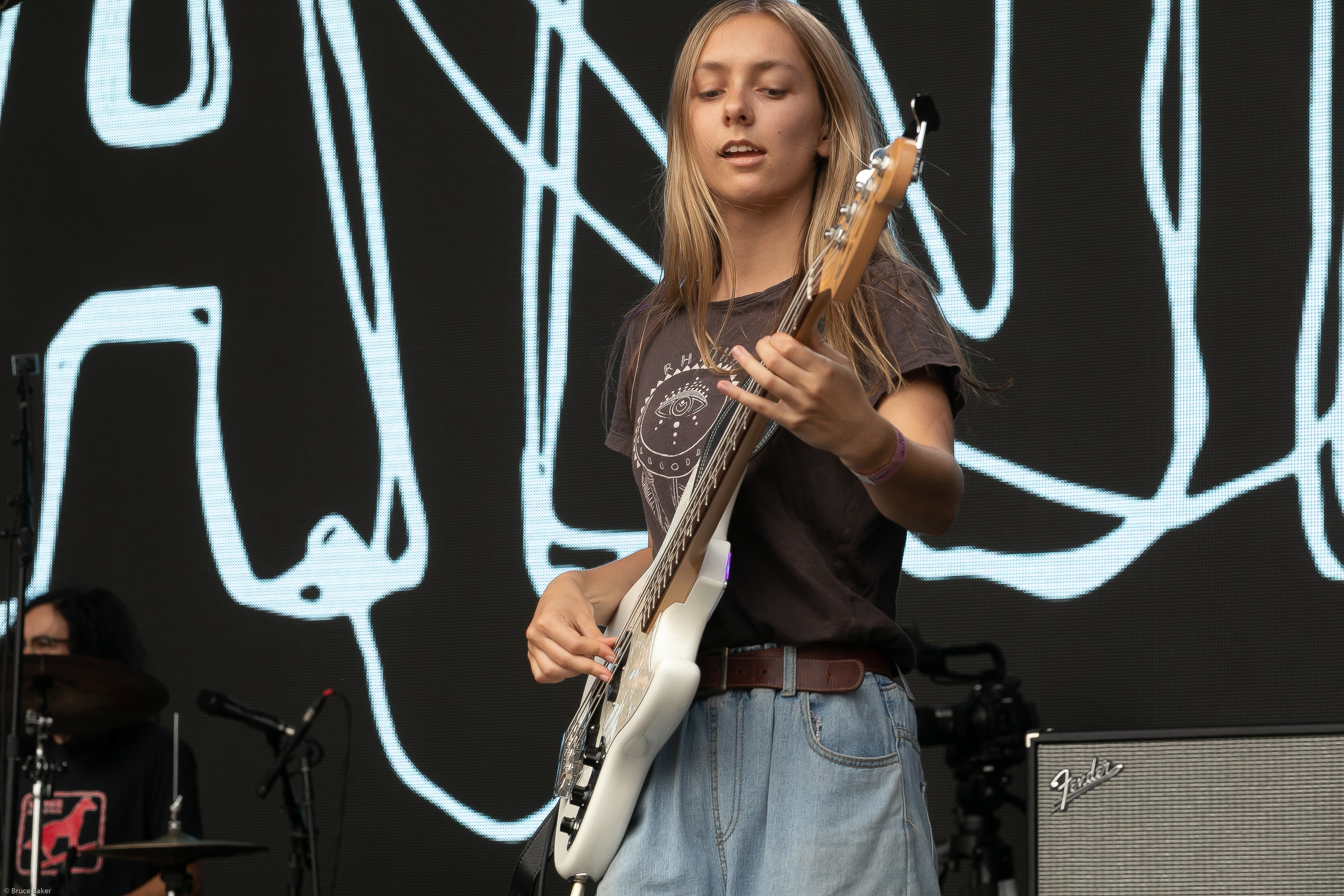
Peppa Lane joined Spacey Jane as bassist following Amelia Murray's departure in 2019.

In July 2019, Murray announced she was amicably leaving the band to focus on her medical career, playing her last show on 13 July. She was replaced on bass guitar by Peppa Lane from Margaret River, who had studied at Western Australian Academy of Performing Arts and performed on double bass in her group, the Friendly Folk. Lane's second show with Spacey Jane was at Splendour in the Grass 2019. Harper has retrospectively admitted that Lane joining "revitalised" the band.

According to Lama, the band toured nationally to "crowds of 20 people" between 2016 and 2019, but that their appearances at Splendour in the Grass and Brisbane's Bigsound festival in 2019 were pivotal moments providing a "ridiculously upward trajectory". Spacey Jane signed a global deal with AWAL in December 2019.

In February 2020, the band announced their debut studio album, Sunlight, was due in June. They toured Australia and New Zealand from March to April in support of their latest single "Skin". In March 2020, the band participated in Isol-Aid, a stay-at-home festival initiative to assist the Australian music industry during the COVID-19 pandemic.

Noted for its "trilling guitar hook", the chorus of "Booster Seat" is one of the band's most recognisable songs.

Upon the release of Sunlight on 12 June 2020, it peaked at number two on the ARIA Charts and went on to top the 2020 Triple J Album Poll. "Booster Seat" received particular acclaim from music publications, with Al Newstead of Triple J calling it a "life-affirming song with a platinum-strength sing-along quality." It went on to win Song of the Year at the 2021 ARIA Awards and Best Independent Song of the Year at the 2021 AIR Awards.

Leading up to the 2020 Triple J Hottest 100, multiple publications predicted that "Booster Seat" would top the list, with Josh Leeson of Northern Beaches Review writing it "is the one presenting the best chance of securing the first Australian Hottest 100 winner since Ocean Alley's 'Confidence' in 2018". In January 2021, "Booster Seat" polled at number two. This milestone led Leeson to call Spacey Jane "arguably the breakthrough Aussie band of 2020."

=== 2021–2023: Here Comes Everybody ===
In February 2021, the band signed to Lama's management company, Anybody Management. In June, they renewed their deal with AWAL, with the label claiming they "firmly believe[d] [Spacey Jane] are now poised to break through on a global scale."

On 24 June 2021, the band released "Lots of Nothing", the lead single to their second studio album. It peaked at number 34 on the ARIA Singles Chart. Partnering with Apple Music in August, Spacey Jane released a three-track EP with acoustic versions of "Lots of Nothing" and "Booster Seat", and a cover of Phoebe Bridgers' 2017 single "Scott Street". They toured the United Kingdom through April, having to add several additional dates after the initial run of shows sold out in a few hours. In December, they contributed to the Wiggles' tribute album ReWiggled, providing a cover version of "D.O.R.O.T.H.Y (My Favourite Dinosaur)". "Lots of Nothing" and "Lunchtime" were featured in the 2021 Triple J Hottest 100 at number three and number 12, respectively.

Spacey Jane's second studio album, Here Comes Everybody, was released on 24 June 2022, (Note: The album was originally slated for release on 10 June 2022, however it was postponed to 24 June due to vinyl production delays.) following six singles including "It's Been a Long Day" in April and "Hardlight" in May. The album debuted at number one on the ARIA Charts, and went on to top the 2022 Triple J Album Poll. The band embarked on the international Here Comes Everybody Tour in August 2022, and also released a cover of Paramore's 2010 song "The Only Exception" as part of a Spotify Singles release.

The band scored six tracks in the 2022 Triple J Hottest 100, including "Hardlight" at number three, and "It's Been a Long Day" and "Sitting Up" at number five and six respectively. This feat equaled a record for most songs charted in a single countdown, previously set by Wolfmother in 2005. Spacey Jane also became the first ever artist to have three top-6 songs in a single countdown.

The band played nationwide on a regional tour from May 2023, and headlined several Australian festivals along the east coast, including Grapevine Gathering, Rolling Sets (Central Coast), and Changing Tides (Kiama) until December 2023.

=== 2024–present: If That Makes Sense, Exit Wounds ===
In January 2024, Spacey Jane issued a standalone single titled "One Bad Day", which was written at the end of sessions for Here Comes Everybody. According to the band, the track was released to "bridge the gap between what was then and what is next."

Following a year-long hiatus from live performances, Spacey Jane announced in January 2025 that their third studio album, If That Makes Sense, would be released in May. It was announced alongside the release of lead single "All the Noise". The album debuted at number two on the ARIA charts.

Spacey Jane headlined Triple J's One Night Stand festival in Busselton, Western Australia on 24 May 2025. In June 2025 the band embarked on an international tour supporting the record, where the Australian leg sold 45,000 tickets in the first week of sales alone.

The band released an EP, Exit Wounds, in June 2026, compiling songs written alongside those from If That Makes Sense which did not make the album's cut. This marks their first EP since 2018's In the Slight.

== Artistry ==
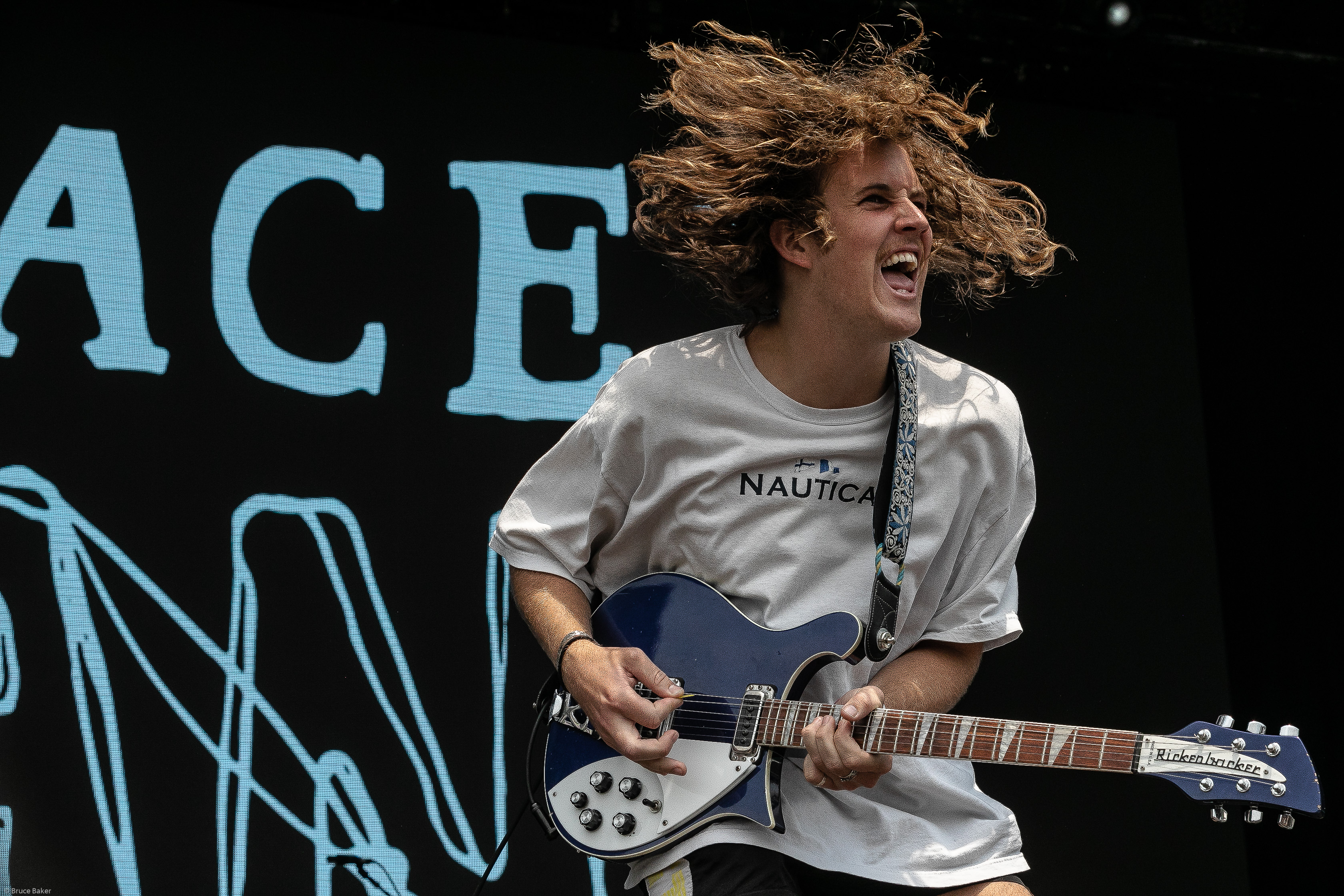
Caleb Harper fronting the group at Laneway Festival in 2020.

In an early interview, Harper said that a lot of his songwriting from the first two EPs were about "moments in life, not necessarily events, but periods in time; and a lot of processing things from childhood and teenage-hood." Lama claimed that the band was "Caleb's vessel to vent teen angst." Harper says that his lyrical inspirations come from understanding "music as a means of catharsis".

Spacey Jane's musical foundations are indie rock and garage rock. Harper's most important musical influences growing up were the Pixies and Wilco, and said that the Strokes, Kings of Leon and Arctic Monkeys were essential sonic foundations for their first album. As the band continued to develop their sound with Here Comes Everybody, their inspirations expanded to the work of Phoebe Bridgers.

The band's earliest singles and debut EP were "packed full of pulsating rhythm and dirty guitars," integrating a "bold indie pop sound with their own raw Australian top coat." With the two singles from In the Meantime in 2018, the band showcased a "notably bright and summery" sound with "light-hearted melodies" with "soaring vocals". In the Slight developed a "dreamy shoegaze" intersection with their brand of "catchy indie pop", and pointed towards the direction they would take with their first album, Sunlight. According to Ali Shutler of NME, the album includes "festival-ready songs that embrace a freewheeling joy... But there’s more to this record than purely chasing the roar of a crowd," commending Harper's vulnerable storytelling contrasting with its affable, jangling melodies.

Spacey Jane continued developing their sound for Here Comes Everybody, which was praised for showcasing new instrumentation and Harper's "fuller use of his vocal range". However, some critics found the album's identity fatiguing– Shaad D'Souza of The Guardian wrote most of the songs "hit the same beats over and over," and Triple J's Al Newstead wrote its model was noticeably similar to that of Sunlight. Nevertheless, Caleb Triscari of NME observed that the album dives "head-first into something the band didn’t explore too much in Sunlight: dreary music for their equally dreary lyrics," particularly referring to tracks "Clean My Car" and "It's Been a Long Day" which "dial down the tempo" to honestly embody the songs' themes.

== Members ==
Current members

- Ashton Hardman-Le Cornu – lead guitar (2016–present)
- Caleb Harper – lead vocals, rhythm guitar (2016–present)
- Kieran Lama – drums (2016–present)
- Peppa Lane – bass guitar, backing vocals (2019–present), keyboards (2025–present)

Past members

- Amelia Murray – bass guitar, backing vocals (2016–2019)

== Discography ==
- Sunlight (2020)
- Here Comes Everybody (2022)
- If That Makes Sense (2025)

== Tours ==
=== Australian tours ===
- In the Slight Australian Tour, 2019
- Good Grief Australian Tour, 2019
- Australian tour, 2019
- Back on the Road, 2020 (Western Australia)
- Spacey Jane with Special Guests, 2020 (Western Australia)
- Sunlight Australia Tour, 2021
- Australian tour, 2022
- Regional Australia Tour, 2023
- Heading Back Down Under, 2026

=== International tours ===
- Head Cold Tour, 2019 (Australia & New Zealand)
- New Zealand tour, 2020
- Skin Tour, 2020 (Australia & New Zealand) (Note: A large part of the Skin Tour was cancelled due to the COVID-19 pandemic.)
- Europe tour, 2022
- Here Comes Everybody Tour, 2022–23 (Australia, New Zealand, Europe & North America)
- If That Makes Sense Tour, 2025 (Australia, New Zealand, Europe & North America)
- North America tour, 2026

=== Opening act ===
- Rainbow Kitten Surprise – Bones World Tour, 2026 (United States)

== Awards and nominations ==
=== AIR Awards ===
The Australian Independent Record Awards (AIR Awards) is an annual awards night to recognise, promote and celebrate the success of Australia's Independent Music sector.

Year	Nominee / work	Award	Result	Ref.
2021	Sunlight	Independent Album of the Year	Nominated	
2021	Sunlight	Best Independent Rock Album or EP	Nominated	
2021	"Booster Seat"	Independent Song of the Year	Won	
2021	Spacey Jane	Breakthrough Independent Artist of the Year	Won	
2026	If That Makes Sense	Best Independent Rock Album or EP	Nominated	

=== APRA Awards ===
The APRA Awards have been presented annually since 1982 and are organised by the Australasian Performing Right Association (APRA), "honouring composers and songwriters".

Year	Nominee / work	Award	Result	Ref.
2021	"Good for You"	Most Performed Rock Work	Nominated	
2021	"Booster Seat"	Song of the Year	Shortlisted	
2022	"Lots of Nothing"	Most Performed Rock Work	Won	
2023	"Lunchtime"	Song of the Year	Shortlisted	
2023	Ashton Hardman-Le Cornu, Caleb Harper, Kieran Lama and Peppa Lane (Spacey Jane)	Breakthrough Songwriter of the Year	Nominated	
2023	"Lunchtime"	Most Performed Rock Work of the Year	Nominated	
2024	"Sorry Instead"	Most Performed Rock Work	Nominated	
2026	"All the Noise"	Most Performed Alternative Work	Nominated	

=== ARIA Music Awards ===
The ARIA Music Awards is an annual awards ceremony that recognises excellence, innovation, and achievement across all genres of Australian music. They commenced in 1987 and are organised by the Australian Recording Industry Association (ARIA).

Year	Nominee / work	Award	Result	Ref.
2021	"Booster Seat"	Song of the Year	Won	
2022	Here Comes Everybody	Best Rock Album	Nominated	
2025	Dan Lesser for Spacey Jane – "All the Noise"	Best Video	Nominated	
2025	If That Makes Sense	Best Rock Album	Nominated	

=== J Awards ===
The J Awards are an annual series of Australian music awards that were established by the Australian Broadcasting Corporation's youth-focused radio station Triple J. They commenced in 2005.

Year	Nominee / work	Award	Result	Ref.
2019	Spacey Jane	Unearthed Artist of the Year	Nominated	
2020	Sunlight	Australian Album of the Year	Nominated	
2022	Here Comes Everybody	Australian Album of the Year	Nominated	
2025	If That Makes Sense	Australian Album of the Year	Nominated	

=== National Live Music Awards ===
The National Live Music Awards (NLMAs) commenced in 2016 to recognise contributions to the live music industry in Australia.

Year	Nominee / work	Award	Result	Ref.
2023	Spacey Jane	Best Live Act in Western Australia	Nominated	

=== Rolling Stone Australia Awards ===
The Rolling Stone Australia Awards are awarded annually in January or February by the Australian edition of Rolling Stone magazine for outstanding contributions to popular culture in the previous year.

Year	Nominee / work	Award	Result	Ref.
2021	Spacey Jane	Rolling Stone Reader's Award	Nominated	
2023	Here Comes Everybody	Best Record	Nominated	
2023	"Hardlight"	Best Single	Won	

=== West Australian Music Industry Awards ===
The West Australian Music Industry Awards (WAMIs) are annual awards presented to the local contemporary music industry, presented annually by the Western Australian Music Industry Association (WAM).

Year	Nominee / work	Award	Result	Ref.
2019	Spacey Jane	Most Popular Live Act	Won	
2020	Spacey Jane	Most Popular Act	Won	
2020	Spacey Jane	Best Pop Act	Won	
2020	Sunlight	Best Album	Won	
2020	"Booster Seat"	Best Single	Won	
