= Feeding the Family =

2017 single by Spacey Jane

Single by Spacey Jane

from the EP No Way to Treat an Animal
- Released: 29 September 2017 (Note: "Feeding the Family" was released on 29 September 2017, according to Bandcamp and social media posts by the band. However, in 2023, metadata for the track on streaming services was changed for unknown reasons to indicate it was uploaded on 29 July 2017, falsely implying it came before their debut single "Still Running" (released on 18 August 2017).)
- Studio: Poons Head, Fremantle
- Genre: Indie rock; garage rock
- Length: 4:44
- Songwriters: Caleb Harper; Ashton Hardman-Le Cornu; Kieran Lama; Amelia Murray
- Producer: Dave Parkin

Spacey Jane singles chronology
"Still Running" (2017)	"Feeding the Family" (2017)	"Thrills" (2017)

"Feeding the Family" is a song by Australian indie rock band Spacey Jane, released on 29 September 2017 as the second single to their debut extended play, No Way to Treat an Animal. It achieved triple platinum status in Australia in 2025 for 210,000 equivalent units. The track is often credited with the band's rise in popularity, and has been described by many publications as their breakthrough hit.

== Composition and release ==
Regarding the song's composition, frontman Caleb Harper claimed himself and drummer Kieran Lama had "been sitting on the progression for a while". Lead guitarist Ashton Hardman-Le Cornu's opening riff was "materialised on the spot", with Harper revealing: “I remember being so blown away by how Ashton wrote that – almost simultaneously".

The song was released on 29 September 2017, premiered at Mojo's Bar in Fremantle, as the second single to the band's debut extended play, No Way to Treat an Animal (2017). Its cover art was handled by visual artist Alice Ford.

In 2025, "Feeding the Family" was certified triple platinum by the Australian Recording Industry Association (ARIA) for 210,000 equivalent units. As of January 2024, the track has over 45 million streams on Spotify.

== Reception ==
The track was labelled "an immediate radio hit" by Time Out upon its release. Ali Shutler of NME called the track a "wonky-indie gem with buckets of personality", while Australian music publication Pilerats claimed the single to "disregard psychedelic sensibilities and pay homage to a cleaner, harder rock sound". Writing for Scenestr, Gareth Bryant wrote "Feeding the Family" is a "sensational ear-worm with an infectious riff". In 2022, the track polled at number 44 on Perth radio station RTRFM's countdown which ranked the 45 greatest songs from Western Australia.

== Legacy ==
Many publications including NME and the Canberra Times have described "Feeding the Family" as Spacey Jane's breakout single. Music outlet The AU Review claimed the band's "trajectory has generally been upward since they burst on to the scene in 2017" with the track, and Tone Deaf explicitly credited the song for the group "fast becoming a favourite of music fans across the whole country". Online magazine Clash wrote it was "arguably the song that first cemented Spacey Jane as a big game player". Despite Harper claiming the band "don't love playing" the song live anymore, saying it has "gotten a bit old", it remains a mainstay on their set lists.

In September 2022, during Triple J's radio event Requestival, Mark McGowan, the Premier of Western Australia, personally requested the station to play "Feeding the Family". He introduced the song before it played, concluding "there's some great talent coming out of the West".

== Certifications ==
Certifications for "Feeding the Family"
Region	Certification	Certified units/sales
Australia (ARIA)	3× Platinum	210,000^{‡}
New Zealand (RMNZ)	Platinum	30,000^{‡}
^{‡} Sales+streaming figures based on certification alone.

== Release history ==
Release formats of "Feeding the Family"
Release date	Region	Format	Label
29 September 2017	Various	Digital download, streaming	Spacey Jane (independent)
May 2020	United Kingdom	7" single (b/w "Head Cold")	Spacey Jane (independent)

== Personnel ==
Credits adapted from Bandcamp.

Spacey Jane

- Caleb Harper – vocals, guitar, writing
- Ashton Hardman-Le Cornu – lead guitar, writing
- Kieran Lama – drums, writing
- Amelia Murray – bass guitar, writing

Additional personnel

- Dave Parkin – producer
- Calum McLaughlin – recording
- Nick Ireland – recording, mixing
- Rob Grant – recording, mastering
- Alice Ford – cover artwork
