= No Way to Treat an Animal =

EP by Spacey Jane
- Released: 17 November 2017
- Studio: Poons Head, East Fremantle
- Genre: Garage rock; indie pop
- Length: 23:48
- Producer: Rob Grant (Note: Tracks 1, 3–4, 6); Dave Parkin (Note: Track 2); Chet Morgan (Note: Track 5); Nick Ireland (Note: Track 6); Calum McLaughlin (Note: Track 6)

Spacey Jane chronology
No Way to Treat an Animal (2017)	In the Slight (2018)

Singles from No Way to Treat an Animal
- 1. "Still Running" Released: 18 August 2017; 2. "Feeding the Family" Released: 29 September 2017; 3. "Thrills" Released: 10 November 2017

No Way to Treat an Animal is the debut extended play (EP) by Australian indie rock band Spacey Jane, released independently on 17 November 2017.

Predominantly produced by Rob Grant in East Fremantle, Western Australia, No Way to Treat an Animal was supported by three singles—their debut single, "Still Running", breakthrough hit "Feeding the Family", and "Thrills".

No Way to Treat an Animal debuted and peaked at number 23 on the ARIA Albums Chart, three years following its release.

== Title and artwork ==
The EP's title is derived from A Man Without a Country, the autobiography of American author Kurt Vonnegut, who wrote: "Life is no way to treat an animal. Not even a mouse." Fremantle-based visual artist Alice Ford designed the cover artwork in addition to promotional posters for its release.

== Composition ==
The majority of recording and mastering for No Way to Treat an Animal was performed by Rob Grant at Poons Head Studios in East Fremantle, Western Australia. "Still Running" was originally written by frontman Caleb Harper for his high school band Sicchino, and was produced and mixed over the space of nearly two years, with band members in and out for travel.

In an interview with Perth-based music publication Pilerats, Harper said the EP is "mostly a reflection on experiences, from childhood through to young adulthood – things like breakups or growing up in church, and how they shape identity."

== Release and promotion ==
On 18 August 2017, Spacey Jane released their debut single "Still Running", which they launched at Mojo's Bar, in Fremantle, Western Australia. At the same venue on 29 September, "Feeding the Family" was released. Their third single "Thrills" was premiered on Perth community station RTRFM on 10 November 2017. "Thrills" would later win Happy Mag's "Needle in the Hay" competition, receiving a limited vinyl pressing and funding for a music video as the prize.

The band held a launch party for No Way to Treat an Animal at the Bird on 16 November 2017, with supporting performances by Carla Geneve and Childsaint. The EP was issued digitally and on a limited run of CDs, and was pressed to LP vinyl in 2020.

== Critical reception ==
Pilerats called No Way to Treat an Animal a "garage-pop odyssey that sounds crisp as hell," and "one of the year's best local EP releases." Nathan Robert, writing for the same website four years later, praised its singles that "disregard psychedelic sensibilities and pay homage to a cleaner, harder rock sound." Writing for Happy Mag, Freya McGahey stated that "Still Running" was "impressive and impeccably crafted," pulling off "clarity of tone and sharp lyricism with perfection." McGahey went on to praise the band for "hav[ing] integrated a bold indie pop sound with their own raw Australian top coat."

Writing for online publication, Scenestr, Gareth Bryant commended "Feeding the Family" for being a "sensational earworm [sic] with an infectious riff." The track was also ranked number 44 on Perth station RTRFM's 2022 listener poll ranking the 45 greatest songs from Western Australia. Online magazine Eat Your Water called the EP an "immediate radio success."

== Commercial performance ==
No Way to Treat an Animal debuted and peaked at number 23 on the ARIA Albums Chart on 13 December 2020.

== Track listing ==
All tracks are written by Caleb Harper, Ashton Hardman-Le Cornu, and Kieran Lama; "Feeding the Family" co-written by Amelia Murray.

No Way to Treat an Animal track listing
No.	Title	Producer	Length
1.	"Thrills"	Rob Grant	3:29
2.	"Feeding the Family"	Dave Parkin	4:44
3.	"Papava"	Grant	3:53
4.	"Feels Better"	Grant	4:37
5.	"Still Running"	Chet Morgan	3:33
6.	"Never Been Sure of Anything"	Grant; Nick Ireland; Calum McLaughlin	3:30
Total length:			23:48

== Personnel ==
Credits adapted from Bandcamp.

Spacey Jane:

- Caleb Harper – vocals, guitar, writing (all tracks)
- Ashton Le Cornu – lead guitar (all tracks)
- Amelia Murray – bass (all tracks)
- Kieran Lama – drums (all tracks)

=== Additional personnel ===
- Nick Ireland – production (6), mixing (1–5)
- Calum McLaughlin – production, mixing (6)
- Rob Grant – producer (tracks 1, 3–4, 6), mastering (all tracks)
- Chet Morgan – production (5)
- Dave Parkin – production (2)
- Alice Ford – cover art

== Charts ==
Chart performance for No Way to Treat an Animal
Chart (2020–2021)	Peak position
Australian Albums (ARIA)	23
