= Booster Seat =

Single by Spacey Jane

from the album Sunlight
- Released: 11 December 2020
- Recorded: January–December 2019
- Studio: Blackbird Sound, Perth; King Willy Sound, Launceston
- Length: 3:38 (single version); 4:28
- Label: AWAL
- Songwriters: Caleb Harper; Amelia Murray; Kieran Lama; Ashton Hardman-Le Cornu
- Producer: Dave Parkin

Spacey Jane singles chronology
"Straightfaced" (2020)	"Booster Seat" (2020)	"Lots of Nothing" (2021)

Music video
- "Booster Seat" on YouTube

"Booster Seat" is a song by Australian indie rock band Spacey Jane from their debut studio album, Sunlight (2020), initially released alongside the album as a focus track on 12 June 2020, before being re-released as a single on 11 December 2020.

"Booster Seat" polled at number two in Triple J's Hottest 100 of 2020, subsequently peaking at number eight on the ARIA Singles Chart and has since been certified 7× Platinum by the Australian Recording Industry Association, for sales in excess of 490,000 units.

The recipient of various awards and nominations, "Booster Seat" was awarded Song of the Year at the 2021 ARIA Music Awards, Best Single at the 2020 West Australian Music Industry Awards, and Independent Song of the Year at the 2021 AIR Awards, and was shortlisted for Song of the Year at the 2021 APRA Awards.

== Background and release ==
Harper admitting its slow pace meant it was "not a standard... single choice". Harper has stated that "none of [the band members] really thought it was going to be that special", but once Sunlight was released, the song became a focus track. Its music video was directed by Matt Sav and released on 11 December 2020.

A radio edit of the song was released on 7 May 2021.

== Composition ==
"Booster Seat" took more than six months to write. Frontman Caleb Harper said its length and slow pacing set it apart from their previous work. The song lyrically deals with "feeling like anxiety and depression are taking control away from you". Al Newstead of Triple J noted the song's "complex emotional metaphor" makes the imagery "easy to grasp" and pointed out "song's gorgeous refrain."

The song originated as a result of Harper "messing about with some open chords on the guitar, sliding gently between the 1st and the 4th of the key." Lead guitarist Ashton Hardman-Le Cornu then developed the riff and presented it to the producer, who originally rejected it.

== Critical reception ==
Al Newstead of Australian youth broadcaster Triple J praised it as a "life-affirming song with a platinum-strength sing-along quality". Its chorus was listed among the best song lyrics of 2020, according to Triple J. Fellow Australian rock band Ocean Alley called the song "a warm and nostalgic masterpiece with thoughtful storytelling and instrumentation to match."

== Commercial performance ==
"Booster Seat" has become Spacey Jane's most popular song, reaching more than 100 million streams on Spotify by April 2025.

In the lead-up to Triple J's Hottest 100 2020, several bookmakers and music publications predicted "Booster Seat" would top the countdown. Josh Leeson of Northern Beaches Review wrote it was "the one presenting the best chance of securing the first Australian Hottest 100 winner since Ocean Alley's "Confidence" in 2018." The song ultimately polled at number two, held off from the number one position by Glass Animals' "Heat Waves". In 2025, the song placed at number 34 in Triple J's Hottest 100 of Australian Songs.

== Legacy ==
Harper cited the song's placement in the Hottest 100 as a key factor in the band's live performances gaining significantly more traction, reflecting "we went from playing 200 or 300 capacity rooms, to playing multiple 1,000 capacity rooms."

== Awards and nominations ==
ARIA Awards and nominations for "Booster Seat"
Year	Nominee / work	Award	Result	Ref.
2021	"Booster Seat"	Song of the Year	Won	

AIR Awards and nominations for "Booster Seat"
Year	Nominee / work	Award	Result	Ref.
2021	"Booster Seat"	Independent Song of the Year	Won	

West Australian Music Industry Awards and nominations for "Booster Seat"
Year	Nominee / work	Award	Result	Ref.
2020	"Booster Seat"	Best Single	Won	

APRA Music Awards and nominations for "Booster Seat"
Year	Nominee / work	Award	Result	Ref.
2021	"Booster Seat"	Song of the Year	Shortlisted	

== Live performances ==
Spacey Jane played "Booster Seat" live at Fremantle Arts Centre on 31 December 2020, before releasing a recording of the performance the following month. The band performed the song as part of Triple J's live music segment Like a Version on 29 January 2021. In August 2021, they released an acoustic version of the track in their Apple Music-exclusive Home Sessions EP.

== Track listing ==
"Booster Seat" digital download and streaming single track listing
No.	Title	Writer(s)	Producer(s)	Length
1.	"Booster Seat" (radio edit)	Caleb Harper; Ashton Hardman-Le Cornu; Kieran Lama; Amelia Murray	Dave Parkin	3:38
2.	"Booster Seat"	Harper; Hardman-Le Cornu; Lama; Murray	Parkin	4:28
Total length:				8:06

== Credits and personnel ==
Adapted from the parent album's liner notes.

Spacey Jane:

- Caleb Harper – vocals, guitar, writing
- Ashton Hardman-Le Cornu – guitar, writing
- Kieran Lama – drums, writing
- Peppa Lane – bass, vocals, writing
- Amelia Murray – bass, vocals, writing

=== Other musicians ===
- Dave Parkin – producer
- William Bowden – mastering

== Charts ==
=== Weekly charts ===
Weekly chart performance for "Booster Seat"
Chart (2021)	Peak position
Australia (ARIA)	8

=== Year-end charts ===
Year-end chart performance for "Booster Seat"
Chart (2021)	Position
Australia (ARIA)	62

== Certifications ==
Certifications for "Booster Seat"
Region	Certification	Certified units/sales
Australia (ARIA)	7× Platinum	490,000^{‡}
New Zealand (RMNZ)	Platinum	30,000^{‡}
^{‡} Sales+streaming figures based on certification alone.

== Release history ==
"Booster Seat" release history and formats
Region(s)	Date	Format(s)	Label(s)	Version	Ref.
Australia	12 June 2020	Focus track	AWAL; Spacey Jane	Original	
Australia	11 December 2020	Contemporary hit radio	AWAL; Spacey Jane	Radio edit	
Australia	7 May 2021	Digital download; streaming	AWAL; Spacey Jane	Radio edit	
United Kingdom	7 May 2021	Digital download; streaming	AWAL; Spacey Jane	Radio edit	
