= Hardlight (song) =

2022 single by Spacey Jane

Single by Spacey Jane

from the album Here Comes Everybody
- Written: 2021
- Released: 18 May 2022
- Studio: Empire, Brisbane
- Genre: Indie rock
- Length: 3:33
- Label: AWAL
- Songwriters: Caleb Harper; Ashton Hardman-Le Cornu; Kieran Lama; Peppa Lane
- Producer: Konstantin Kersting

Spacey Jane singles chronology
"It's Been a Long Day" (2022)	"Hardlight" (2022)	"Pulling Through" (2022)

Music video
- "Hardlight" on YouTube

"Hardlight" is a song by Australian indie rock band Spacey Jane, released on 18 May 2022 as the fifth single to their second studio album, Here Comes Everybody. Premiered on BBC Radio 1, it peaked at number 68 on the ARIA Singles chart and number 37 on the NZ Hot Singles chart. The song was considered a favourite to top Triple J's Hottest 100 of 2022, on which it was polled into third place. "Hardlight" won Best Single at the 2023 Rolling Stone Australia Awards. In 2024, the song was certified gold by the Australian Recording Industry Association for selling 35,000 units.

== Background and release ==
On 10 February 2022, the band announced on Triple J's breakfast program Bryce & Ebony that their forthcoming studio album would be titled Here Comes Everybody. On the same day as the announcement, they issued its third single, "Sitting Up". On 8 April, "It's Been a Long Day" was released as the fourth, and "Hardlight" followed on 19 May 2022. The song premiered on BBC Radio 1 with Jack Saunders, and the band shared details of a forthcoming Australian tour on the same day. A music video was also released, directed by Nick Mckk, which sees the band performing on a boat sailing through the Yarra River.

== Composition ==
Upon the release, frontman Caleb Harper stated “I wrote this song about how I was feeling like my life was a bit like one of those nightmares where you’re at school with no pants, except I used the metaphor of being on set and forgetting all of your lines".

== Reception ==
Caleb Triscari of NME wrote "Hardlight" is a "standout from the album", comparing its sound to that of the War on Drugs and containing "reverb and layered guitar to illustrate the lingering, meaningless ache of depression". Deb Pelser of Backseat Mafia wrote the track features "the band's trademark jangly indie rock with an irresistible chorus and Harper’s plaintive vocals perfectly rounding out the track".

As of January 2023, the song has over four million streams on Spotify. Alex Callan of music publication Forte claimed "the Fremantle based garage rockers are in pretty good stead to take out the revered title" of topping Triple J's Hottest 100 of 2022.

== Other versions ==
On 17 August 2022, the band released a two-track single exclusive to Spotify, containing a cover of Paramore's "The Only Exception" and an acoustic re-recording of "Hardlight". Upon its issuing, Harper stated "it was cool to go back to the song and play around with ideas that didn’t quite make the album cut and approach it with fresh ears". While touring Melbourne venue Forum Theatre, the band further recorded a suite of additional acoustic performances of songs from Here Comes Everybody, including a rendition of "Hardlight" released in November 2022. In February 2023, a deluxe version of Here Comes Everybody was issued, which includes a live recording of "Hardlight" performed at RAC Arena in August 2022.

== Personnel ==
- Caleb Harper – vocals, guitar, writing
- Ashton Hardman-Le Cornu – lead guitar, writing
- Kieran Lama – drums, writing
- Peppa Lane – bass guitar, backing vocals, writing
- Konstantin Kersting – producer
- Rich Costey – mixing

== Charts ==
Chart performance for "Hardlight"
Chart (2022–2023)	Peak position
Australia (ARIA)	68
New Zealand Hot Singles (RMNZ)	37

== Certifications ==
Certifications for "Hardlight"
Region	Certification	Certified units/sales
Australia (ARIA)	Gold	35,000^{‡}
^{‡} Sales+streaming figures based on certification alone.
