= Sunlight (Spacey Jane album) =

Studio album by Spacey Jane
- Released: 12 June 2020
- Recorded: January–December 2019
- Studios: Blackbird Sound, Perth; King Willy Sound, Launceston
- Genres: Indie rock; alternative rock
- Length: 41:50
- Label: AWAL
- Producer: Dave Parkin

Spacey Jane chronology
In the Slight (2018)	Sunlight (2020)	Here Comes Everybody (2022)

Singles from Sunlight
- 1. "Good Grief" Released: 24 April 2019; 2. "Good for You" Released: 15 August 2019; 3. "Head Cold" Released: 12 November 2019; 4. "Skin" Released: 26 February 2020; 5. "Straightfaced" Released: 1 May 2020; 6. "Booster Seat" Released: December 2020

Sunlight is the debut studio album by Australian indie rock band Spacey Jane, released on 12 June 2020 through AWAL. It was recorded throughout all of 2019 and produced by Dave Parkin. Sunlight is the band's final release to include contributions from bassist Amelia Murray, who plays on the album alongside her successor Peppa Lane. Described by frontman Caleb Harper as an album "full of apologies", Sunlight lyrically acts as a reflection on his mental health amidst relationship breakdowns, in contrast to its affable melodies and jangling instrumentation.

Supported by five singles and several national tours throughout 2019 to 2021, Sunlight contains the band's triple-platinum track "Booster Seat". Debuting at number two on the ARIA Albums Chart, the record was voted number one in Triple J's Album Poll and was nominated for Independent Album of the Year and Best Independent Rock Album at the 2021 AIR Awards. For selling over 35,000 copies, Sunlight was certified gold by the Australian Recording Industry Association (ARIA) in 2022.

== Background ==
In November 2018, Spacey Jane released their second extended play (EP), In the Slight. In July 2019, the group announced bassist Amelia Murray would be amicably leaving the band to pursue a career in medicine. She was soon replaced by Peppa Lane from Margaret River, who had studied at the Western Australian Academy of Performing Arts and performed on double bass in her group, the Friendly Folk. On 20 December 2019, Spacey Jane signed with English record label AWAL, following a "breakout year" for the band, having become the fifth most-played artist on Triple J Unearthed in 2019.

== Recording ==
Frontman Caleb Harper wrote most of Sunlight over 18 months beginning in mid-2018. In that time, he experienced both the beginning and the end of a relationship, which informed much of the record's lyricism. Spacey Jane recorded the album from January to December 2019, in approximately 10 studio sessions arranged around the band members' work and studies. Harper has said that it was difficult trying to craft a thematically cohesive record given the intermittent recording schedule.

Out of the twelve tracks on Sunlight, five were co-written by Murray before her departure, and she performs bass guitar in five songs including "Booster Seat", which also features backing vocals from new member Lane. Some songs were written while the band was in the studio, including the title track and "Trucks". The latter features the first and only vocal take Harper recorded for the song, with a synth demo that guitarist Ashton Harman-Le Cornu created on his phone. Sunlight was produced by Dave Parkin in Perth, who had worked with the band on their first two EPs, and mastered by William Bowden in Launceston, Tasmania.

== Composition ==
"Trucks" features a prominent synth line in the chorus, which was recorded by Le Cornu on his phone, and features Harper's first vocal take.

Described as an alternative and indie rock album focused around jangling guitars, the addition of synth lines and cooing backing vocals on Sunlight marked an expansion in the band's musical palette. Harper was admittedly nervous about these textural changes, saying to NME the album has "no sound to it that is typical of us". The band experimented, particularly on "Weightless", which features a synth arpeggio and no distinctive riffs. Harper said the track was "a test to see how ready we are to expand beyond the indie based guitar music we’ve been making". Drummer Kieran Lama explored alternative percussion options on "Skin", using congas for the first time in a Spacey Jane song.

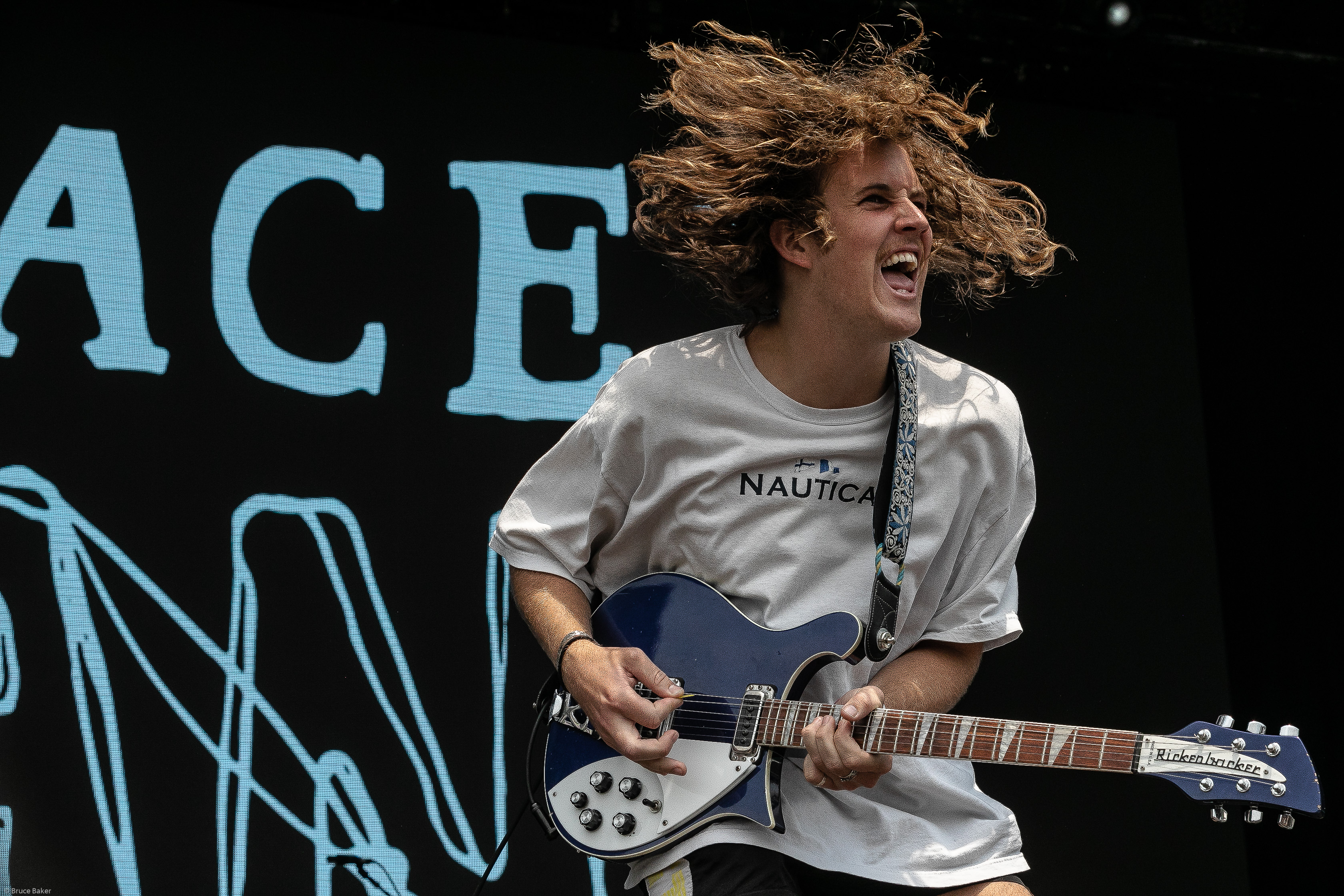
Most of Sunlight is written from Harper's perspective, regarding his relationships and mental health.

While the album's instrumentation is often uptempo, with "Good for You" in particular containing "frantic guitar solos and rough-around-the-edges grit", Harper's lyricism on Sunlight emphasises introspection, anxiety and depression due to relationship breakdowns with romantic partners and family. "Booster Seat", in particular, explores feelings of guilt and losing control, while "Trucks" sees Harper at his "most wrenching and inconsolable", according to one reviewer. Meanwhile, the "tight, sour-faced rock" production on "Love Me Like I Haven't Changed" features "wispy harmony vocals" and a sound reminiscent of the Strokes, per Ben Malkin of music publication Indie Is Not a Genre. Reflecting on his bandmate's conversational tone, Lama said Harper's lyrics reminded him of pop-punk and emo writing styles, particularly that of Modern Baseball.

== Release and promotion ==
"Good Grief" was released as the album's lead single on 24 April 2019, and was supported by a six-date Australian tour. The second single, "Good for You", was released on 15 August. It would later poll at number 80 in the Triple J Hottest 100 of 2019, marking the band's first appearance in the annual countdown. "Head Cold" was released on 12 November as the third single, and was supported by the national Head Cold Tour. Sunlight was officially announced on 26 February 2020, along with the track list, cover art, release date, details of a third national tour, and the fourth single, "Skin". On 1 May, "Straightfaced" was issued as the fifth single.

Sunlight was released on 12 June 2020, in the throes of the first COVID-19 lockdowns in Australia. On the day, the band held an online party with customers of the album via Zoom. With border closures affecting Western Australia, tour dates coinciding with the album's release were cancelled, including their headlining tour of the United Kingdom and remaining dates of their Australia & New Zealand Skin Tour. Lama, who also manages the band, said planning a tour at the height of the pandemic was a major logistical challenge and a financial risk, and that he'd "never take live music for granted anymore." From March 2021, they embarked on an Australian tour in support of Sunlight, with support from Carla Geneve. The 15 initial shows almost sold out within 30 minutes – seven extra dates were later added.

Sunlight peaked at number two on the ARIA Albums Chart and topped Triple J's annual Album Poll. At the 2021 AIR Awards, Sunlight was nominated for Independent Album of the Year and Best Independent Rock Album. In the Triple J Hottest 100 of 2020, "Booster Seat" polled at number two, after several publications predicted it to top the countdown. Three other songs from the album also featured in the list. In June 2021, Spacey Jane released a limited edition, deluxe LP box set of Sunlight, featuring two previously unreleased studio tracks, three live performances, and a cover of "Fill in the Blank" by Car Seat Headrest.

== Critical reception ==
Professional ratings
Review scores
Source	Rating
The Canberra Times	3.5/5 stars
NME	4/5 stars
Upset	3/5 stars
The West Australian	4.5/5 stars

Sunlight received "widespread acclaim" upon release. Reviewing for NME, Shutler wrote that "as huge as Spacey Jane sound on Sunlight, it's never at the expense of their heartfelt honesty". Declan Byrne of Triple J summarised the album as "one of the smoothest indie rock rides you’ll enjoy from an Aussie guitar band this year," praising its "breezy-sounding songs with emotional weight and heft". Looking ahead to their next endeavours, Josh Leeson for the Canberra Times said the band still has "plenty of room to mature in future releases to flesh out a more unique sound".

== Track listing ==
Standard edition

All tracks are written by Caleb Harper, Kieran Lama, Peppa Lane and Ashton Hardman-Le Cornu, unless otherwise noted.

No.	Title	Writer(s)	Length
1.	"Good for You"	Harper; Lama; Le Cornu; Amelia Murray	2:54
2.	"Head Cold"	Harper; Lama; Le Cornu; Murray	3:07
3.	"Skin"		3:14
4.	"Good Grief"	Harper; Lama; Le Cornu; Murray	3:48
5.	"Wasted on Me"		3:48
6.	"Booster Seat"	Harper; Lama; Le Cornu; Murray	4:28
7.	"Love Me Like I Haven't Changed"		3:58
8.	"Weightless"		4:11
9.	"Straightfaced"	Harper; Lama; Lane; Le Cornu; Murray	3:38
10.	"Trucks"		3:12
11.	"Hanging"		3:24
12.	"Sunlight"		2:08
Total length:			41:50

Deluxe box set

Side three
No.	Title	Length
1.	"Up Against It"	3:17
2.	"Under My Breath"	3:36
3.	"Skin" (Live on the Ocean)	3:14

Side four
No.	Title	Length
1.	"Good for You" (Live on the Ocean)	2:54
2.	"Booster Seat" (Live at Fremantle Arts Centre)	4:29
3.	"Fill in the Blank" (Car Seat Headrest cover)	4:03
Total length:		63:23

== Personnel ==
Musicians

- Caleb Harper – lead vocals, guitar, writing
- Ashton Hardman-Le Cornu – lead guitar, writing
- Kieran Lama – drums, writing
- Peppa Lane – bass guitar, backing vocals; writing (tracks 3, 5, 7–12)
- Amelia Murray – bass guitar, backing vocals; writing (tracks 1–2, 4, 6, 9)

Additional personnel

- Dave Parkin – producer
- William Bowden – mastering
- Daniel Hildebrand – photography
- Garreth Pearse – deluxe edition design
- Matt Sav – cover photography

== Charts ==
=== Weekly charts ===
Weekly chart performance for Sunlight
Chart (2020)	Peak position
Australian Albums (ARIA)	2

=== Year-end charts ===
2020 year-end chart performance for Sunlight
Chart (2020)	Position
Australian Albums (ARIA)	100

2021 year-end chart performance for Sunlight
Chart (2021)	Position
Australian Albums (ARIA)	42

2022 year-end chart performance for Sunlight
Chart (2022)	Position
Australian Albums (ARIA)	67

== Certifications ==
List of certifications for Sunlight
Region	Certification	Certified units/sales
Australia (ARIA)	Gold	35,000^{‡}
^{‡} Sales+streaming figures based on certification alone.
