= Triple J's Hottest 100 of 2020 =

Edition of annual Australian music poll

2020 Triple J Hottest 100
- Album artwork for the CD compilation

Countdown details
- Date of countdown: 23 January 2021
- Charity partner: Lifeline
- Votes cast: 2,790,224

Countdown highlights
- Winning song: Glass Animals "Heat Waves"
- Most entries: Lime Cordiale (5 tracks)

Chronology
← Previous; 2010s	Next → 2021

The 2020 Triple J Hottest 100 was announced on 23 January 2021. It is the 28th countdown of the most popular songs of the year, as chosen by listeners of Australian radio station Triple J. The countdown was announced on the fourth weekend of January.

English band Glass Animals was voted into first place with their single "Heat Waves", becoming the first British act to top the annual list in 11 years, with the previous case being when Mumford & Sons won the 2009 countdown with "Little Lion Man". Australian band Lime Cordiale achieved the most entries in the countdown, at five.

== Background ==
The Triple J Hottest 100 allows members of the public to vote online for their top ten songs of the year, which are then used to calculate the year's 100 most popular songs. Any song initially released between 1 December 2019 and 30 November 2020 was eligible for 2020's Hottest 100.

Voting opened on 8 December 2020. Several artists and presenters made their votes public, including Billie Eilish, Flume, and Glass Animals. The artists most often voted for by these artists were Tkay Maidza, Tame Impala, Spacey Jane, and The Strokes.

=== Projections ===
Prior to the countdown, two favourites had emerged. Various music blogs and bookmakers placed "Heat Waves" by English psych-pop band Glass Animals and "Booster Seat" by Australian indie-rock band Spacey Jane as the two songs most likely to take first place. Glass Animals previously placed 12th in 2014, also ranking in the top 40 in 2016 and 2019; while Spacey Jane debuted at 80th in 2019. Both songs respectively placed in first and second on the countdown.

== Full list ==
Note: Australian artists

#	Song	Artist	Country of origin
1	Heat Waves	Glass Animals	United Kingdom
2	Booster Seat	Spacey Jane	Australia
3	The Difference	Flume and Toro y Moi	Australia/United States
4	Cherub	Ball Park Music	Australia
5	Lost in Yesterday	Tame Impala	Australia
6	WAP	Cardi B featuring Megan Thee Stallion	United States
7	Hyperfine	G Flip	Australia
8	Sending Me Ur Loving	The Jungle Giants	Australia
9	I'm Good?	Hilltop Hoods	Australia
10	Therefore I Am	Billie Eilish	United States
11	On Our Own	Lime Cordiale	Australia
12	Get on the Beers	Mashd N Kutcher featuring Dan Andrews	Australia
13	Rockstar	Mallrat	Australia
14	Tombstone	Ocean Alley	Australia
15	Skin	Spacey Jane	Australia
16	Screw Loose	Lime Cordiale	Australia
17	Is It True	Tame Impala	Australia
18	Tangerine	Glass Animals	United Kingdom
19	You Should Be Sad	Halsey	United States
20	Addicted to the Sunshine	Lime Cordiale	Australia
21	Energy	Stace Cadet and KLP	Australia
22	Complicated	Eves Karydas	Australia
23	Good News	Mac Miller	United States
24	Blue World	Mac Miller	United States
25	Reality Check Please	Lime Cordiale	Australia
26	No Plans to Make Plans	Lime Cordiale	Australia
27	Under the Thunder	Skegss	Australia
28	Straightfaced	Spacey Jane	Australia
29	Dribble	Sycco	Australia
30	Bagi-la-m Bargan	Birdz featuring Fred Leone	Australia
31	Reasons	San Cisco	Australia
32	Criminals	DMA's	Australia
33	Breathe Deeper	Tame Impala	Australia
34	Everybody Rise	Amy Shark	Australia
35	Running Red Lights	The Avalanches featuring Rivers Cuomo and Pink Siifu	Australia/United States
36	Forget Me Too	Machine Gun Kelly featuring Halsey	United States
37	So Done	The Kid Laroi	Australia
38	Parasite Eve	Bring Me the Horizon	United Kingdom
39	Righteous	Juice Wrld	United States
40	Come & Go	Juice Wrld and Marshmello	United States
41	I Still Dream About You	The Smith Street Band	Australia
42	Whats Poppin	Jack Harlow	United States
43	Together	Ziggy Alberts	Australia
44	You & I	G Flip	Australia
45	As Long as You Care	Ruel	Australia
46	Pretty Lady	Tash Sultana	Australia
47	Animals	Architects	United Kingdom
48	Ain't It Different	Headie One, AJ Tracey and Stormzy	United Kingdom
49	Wishing Well	Juice Wrld	United States
50	Nothing to Love About Love	Peking Duk and The Wombats	Australia/United Kingdom
51	Your Love (Déjà Vu)	Glass Animals	United Kingdom
52	The Glow	DMA's	Australia
53	In Your Eyes	The Weeknd	Canada
54	Blue (Flume Remix)	Eiffel 65	Italy/Australia
55	I Think You're Great	Alex the Astronaut	Australia
56	On the Line	San Cisco	Australia
57	Sobercoaster	Beddy Rays	Australia
58	Fly Away	Tones and I	Australia
59	Gimme Love	Joji	Japan
60	Go	The Kid Laroi and Juice Wrld	Australia/United States
61	Pretty Grim	Ruby Fields	Australia
62	Run	Joji	Japan
63	Day & Age	Ball Park Music	Australia
64	Soak Me in Bleach	The Amity Affliction	Australia
65	C'mon	Amy Shark featuring Travis Barker	Australia/United States
66	Fantasising	Skegss	Australia
67	Boss Bitch	Doja Cat	United States
68	Lie to Me	Vera Blue	Australia
69	Second	Hope D	Australia
70	Low	Chet Faker	Australia
71	Obey	Bring Me the Horizon and Yungblud	United Kingdom
72	Way Down	Ocean Alley	Australia
73	Don't Need You	Genesis Owusu	Ghana/Australia
74	Scream Drive Faster	Laurel	United Kingdom
75	Photo ID	Remi Wolf	United States
76	Baby It's You	London Grammar	United Kingdom
77	House Arrest	Sofi Tukker and Gorgon City	United States/United Kingdom
78	Lady Marmalade (Like a Version)	G Flip featuring Thandi Phoenix, JessB, Jess Kent, Isabella Manfredi, Rosie Fitzgerald, Alex the Astronaut, Clio Renner, Kate Richards, Bernice Tesara and Carla Dobbie	Australia/New Zealand
79	My Future	Billie Eilish	United States
80	Freaks	Fisher	Australia
81	Weightless	Spacey Jane	Australia
82	The Clap	The Chats	Australia
83	Down for You	Cosmo's Midnight and Ruel	Australia
84	Chicken Tenders	Dominic Fike	United States
85	Too Tough Terry	Dune Rats	Australia
86	Laugh Now Cry Later	Drake featuring Lil Durk	Canada/United States
87	Three Leaf Clover	Teenage Joans	Australia
88	Heart Attack	Bronson featuring Lau.ra	Australia/United States/United Kingdom
89	In Her Eyes	The Jungle Giants	Australia
90	No Time to Die	Billie Eilish	United States
91	Charlie (Like a Version)	Bugs	Australia
92	These Days	Thelma Plum	Australia
93	Lemonade	Internet Money and Gunna featuring Don Toliver and Nav	United States/Canada
94	Rain	Aitch and AJ Tracey featuring Tay Keith	United Kingdom/United States
95	Loose Ends	Illy featuring G Flip	Australia
96	Germaphobe	Hockey Dad	Australia
97	Audacity	Stormzy featuring Headie One	United Kingdom
98	Your Man	Joji	Japan
99	Itch	Hockey Dad	Australia
100	Kool	Benee	New Zealand

=== #101-200 List ===
On 24 January, 2021, Triple J announced the songs that made the #101-200 positions.

#	Song	Artist	Country of origin
101	R U 4 Me?	Middle Kids	Australia
102	My High	Disclosure, Aminé and Slowthai	United Kingdom/United States
103	Concert For Aliens	Machine Gun Kelly	United States
104	Distance	Ruel	Australia
105	Heavy Weather	The Rubens	Australia
106	Teardrops	Bring Me the Horizon	United Kingdom
107	Every Day is a Holiday	Dope Lemon featuring Winston Surfshirt	Australia
108	Send It!	Hooligan Hefs	Australia
109	Kyoto	Phoebe Bridgers	United States
110	Life Is a Game of Changing	DMA's	Australia
111	Bad Child	Tones and I	Australia
112	10%	Kaytranada featuring Kali Uchis	Canada/United States
113	Pick It Up Again	Violent Soho	Australia
114	Hot Chicken	Ocean Alley	Australia
115	Nothing For Free	Pendulum	Australia
116	Say It Over	Ruel featuring Cautious Clay	Australia/United States
117	Lying On the Floor	Violent Soho	Australia
118	After Hours	The Weeknd	Canada
119	Save Your Tears	The Weeknd	Canada
120	Yesteryear	Cosmo's Midnight	Australia
121	After All This Time	Allday	Australia
122	Cotton Candy	Yungblud	United Kingdom
123	Good Eye	Hockey Dad	Australia
124	Up In There	Ocean Alley	Australia
125	Shook	Tkay Maidza	Australia
126	Anything	Alison Wonderland and Valentino Khan	Australia/United States
127	Death Bed (Coffee for Your Head)	Powfu featuring Beabadoobee	Canada/United Kingdom
128	Savage Remix	Megan Thee Stallion featuring Beyoncé	United States
129	Better Days	Baker Boy and Dallas Woods featuring Sampa the Great	Australia/Zambia
130	Time Of My Life	The Rubens	Australia
131	Bad Decisions	The Strokes	United States
132	Moving Blind	Sonny Fodera and Dom Dolla	Australia
133	Move	Baker Boy	Australia
134	Blurry	Stand Atlantic	Australia
135	Snail	Benee	New Zealand
136	Dreamland	Glass Animals	United Kingdom
137	Honey	King Gizzard & the Lizard Wizard	Australia
138	Laying Low	Chillinit	Australia
139	Impossible	Nothing But Thieves	United Kingdom
140	Window	Still Woozy	United States
141	In This State	Hockey Dad	Australia
142	Hit Different	SZA featuring Ty Dolla Sign	United States
143	Diet	Denzel Curry and Kenny Beats	United States
144	Good Things	Wafia	Australia
145	Kingslayer	Bring Me the Horizon featuring Babymetal	United Kingdom/Japan
146	Things I Thought Were Mine	Alfie Templeman	United Kingdom
147	Daylight	Joji and Diplo	Japan/United States
148	Love Language	Crooked Colours	Australia
149	Tell Me Why	The Kid Laroi	Australia
150	Stupid Is as Stupid Does	Dune Rats featuring K.Flay	Australia/United States
151	Spark Up!	Ball Park Music	Australia
152	Fired Up	DZ Deathrays	Australia
153	Wrong	The Kid Laroi featuring Lil Mosey	Australia/United States
154	Simmer	Hayley Williams	United States
155	Franchise	Travis Scott featuring Young Thug and M.I.A.	United States/United Kingdom
156	Lonely Diamond	Ocean Alley	Australia
157	Rockstar (Black Lives Matter remix)	DaBaby featuring Roddy Ricch	United States
158	Chicago Freestyle	Drake featuring Giveon	Canada/United States
159	OTT	Allday and Memphis LK	Australia
160	I Wanna Be Here	E^ST	Australia
161	Tyler Herro	Jack Harlow	United States
162	Know Your Worth	Khalid and Disclosure	United States/United Kingdom
163	That's Life	Lime Cordiale	Australia
164	Forever Young (Like a Version)	Tones and I featuring Jordan Dennis	Australia
165	Black Fingernails, Red Wine (Like a Version)	Polaris	Australia
166	OK	Wallows	United States
167	19	Slowly Slowly	Australia
168	Hey, Ma (Like a Version)	The Vanns	Australia
169	The Water	Hands Like Houses	Australia
170	Head Like a Sieve	Ball Park Music	Australia
171	Hypermania	Polaris	Australia
172	Life Is Good	Future featuring Drake	United States/Canada
173	Dizzy	Azure Ryder	Australia
174	3am	Halsey	United States
175	Toosie Slide	Drake	Canada
176	Dine N Dash	The Chats	Australia
177	Just	Run the Jewels featuring Pharrell Williams and Zack de la Rocha	United States
178	Finally // Beautiful Stranger	Halsey	United States
179	For the Night	Pop Smoke featuring Lil Baby and DaBaby	United States
180	Let Me Down	Oliver Tree	United States
181	La Luh	Choomba	Australia
182	Tell Em I'm Doing Eetswa	Hooligan Hefs	Australia
183	Fucked Myself Up	Merci, Mercy	Australia
184	Is Everybody Going Crazy?	Nothing But Thieves	United Kingdom
185	It's All So Incredibly Loud	Glass Animals	United Kingdom
186	Ur So F**king Cool	Tones and I	Australia
187	Cracks	Sly Withers	Australia
188	All My Friends	Great Gable	Australia
189	Ticket To Heaven	Alice Ivy and Thelma Plum	Australia
190	Apricots	May-a	Australia
191	Bad Things	Alison Wonderland	Australia
192	Dear April (Justice remix)	Frank Ocean	United States/France
193	Night Garden	Benee featuring Kenny Beats and Bakar	New Zealand/United Kingdom/United States
194	Wash Us in the Blood	Kanye West featuring Travis Scott	United States
195	Wolves	Big Sean featuring Post Malone	United States
196	Race Car Blues	Slowly Slowly	Australia
197	Cash Machine	Oliver Tree	United States
198	Driver	Pendulum	Australia
199	Only Time Makes It Human	King Princess	United States
200	Posthumous Forgiveness	Tame Impala	Australia

== Statistics ==
=== Artists with multiple entries ===
#	Artist	Tracks
5	Lime Cordiale	11, 16, 20, 25, 26
4	Spacey Jane	2, 15, 28, 81
4	G Flip (Note: Three times solo (7, 44, 78) and once with Illy (95))	7, 44, 78, 95
4	Juice Wrld (Note: Twice solo (39, 49), once as co-lead artist (40), and once with The Kid Laroi (60))	39, 40, 49, 60
3	Glass Animals	1, 18, 51
3	Tame Impala	5, 17, 33
3	Billie Eilish	10, 79, 90
3	Joji	59, 62, 98
2	Flume (Note: Once as lead artist (3), and once as remixer/producer (54))	3, 54
2	Ball Park Music	4, 63
2	The Jungle Giants	8, 89
2	Ocean Alley	14, 72
2	Halsey (Note: Once solo (19) and once with Machine Gun Kelly (36))	19, 36
2	Mac Miller	23, 24
2	Skegss	27, 66
2	San Cisco	31, 56
2	DMA's	32, 52
2	Amy Shark	34, 65
2	The Kid Laroi	37, 60
2	Bring Me the Horizon	38, 71
2	Ruel	45, 83
2	AJ Tracey	48, 94
2	Stormzy	48, 97
2	Headie One (Note: once solo/as co-lead artist (48) and once with Stormzy (97))	48, 97
2	Hockey Dad	96, 99

=== Countries represented ===
Country	#
Australia	65
United States	24
United Kingdom	14
Canada	3
Japan	3
Ghana	1
Italy	1
New Zealand	1

=== Records ===
- With 66 tracks by Australian artists, the 2020 countdown ties 2016's record for the most Australian tracks in a single countdown.
- Two artists, Peking Duk and DMA's, appeared in their seventh consecutive annual Hottest 100. In doing so, ties them for the 2nd longest consecutive streak alongside Regurgitator between 1995 and 2001, The Whitlams between 1996 and 2002 and Something For Kate between 1997 and 2003. They sit only 3 behind The Living End, whose tracks featured for ten years in a row between 1997 and 2006.
- With "I'm Good?" being voted in at number 9, Hilltop Hoods marked their 22nd track to appear in an annual Hottest 100, equaling the record currently shared by Powderfinger and Foo Fighters.
- This year's countdown included six songs from Indigenous Australian artists, surpassing 2019's record of five. Gamilaraay man The Kid Laroi featured twice, while there was one track each from: Torres Strait Islander woman Sycco; Butchulla/Nguburinji man Birdz; Beddy Rays, who are fronted by Wapabara man Jackson Van Issum; and Gamilaraay woman Thelma Plum.
- At number 6, "WAP" became the first song by a female rapper to enter the top 10, with Cardi B and Megan Thee Stallion becoming the highest charting women of colour in Hottest 100 history.
- At number 49 with their track "Pretty Lady", Tash Sultana is the first openly non-binary artist to feature in the countdown. Sultana has previously featured in the Hottest 100, with two songs in the 2016 countdown including the number three spot with "Jungle". Sam Smith had featured on two tracks by Disclosure prior to their coming out.
- Juice Wrld, who died in December 2019, was posthumously voted into the countdown four times: at number 39 on "Righteous", at number 40 with Marshmello on "Come & Go", at number 49 with "Wishing Well", and at number 60 with the Kid Laroi on "Go".
- Mac Miller, who died in September 2018, was also posthumously voted into the countdown, appearing at numbers 23 and 24 with "Good News" and "Blue World", respectively. Miller was also the first deceased artist to feature on the countdown since Ou Est Le Swimming Pool in the 2010 countdown, having previously been voted in at number 60 in the 2018 countdown with "Ladders".
- Tash Sultana, who identifies as non-binary (and uses the pronoun they), is the only artist who identifies as neither male nor female to feature. They came in at number 46 with "Pretty Lady". Sultana has previously featured in the countdown, with "Jungle" appearing at number 3 in the 2016 countdown. Sultana is the most successful gender-diverse artist in the history of the Hottest 100. (G Flip, who appeared in the 2018, 2019 and 2020 countdowns, came out as non-binary in 2021.)
- Flume became the first artist to have appeared in each of the top 5 spots of the countdown across the years. "Never Be Like You" placed first in 2016, "Rushing Back" came second in 2019, "The Difference" placed third in 2020, "Holdin On" placed fourth in 2012 and "Drop the Game" placed fifth in 2013.

== 2020 Triple J Album Poll ==
The annual Triple J album poll was held across November and December and was announced on 13 December 2020.

Note: Australian artists

#	Artist	Album	Country of origin	Tracks in the Hottest 100
1	Spacey Jane	Sunlight	Australia	2, 15, 28, 81, (80 in 2019)
2	Lime Cordiale	14 Steps to a Better You	Australia	11, 16, 20, 25, 26, (86 in 2018, 7, 13, 32 in 2019)
3	Tame Impala	The Slow Rush	Australia	5, 17, 33, (18, 43 in 2019)
4	Ball Park Music	Ball Park Music	Australia	4, 63
5	Hockey Dad	Brain Candy	Australia	96, 99, (60 in 2019)
6	DMA's	The Glow	Australia	32, 52, (20 in 2019)
7	Ocean Alley	Lonely Diamond	Australia	14, 72, (24, 54 in 2019)
8	Glass Animals	Dreamland	United Kingdom	1, 18, 51, (34 in 2019)
9	San Cisco	Between You and Me	Australia	31, 56, (48 in 2018, 97 in 2019)
10	Violent Soho	Everything Is A-OK	Australia	(69 in 2019)
11	Mac Miller	Circles	United States	23, 24
12	Benee	Hey u x	New Zealand	100
13	The Chats	High Risk Behaviour	Australia	82, (21 in 2019)
14	Dune Rats	Hurry Up and Wait	Australia	(100 in 2019)
15	Slowly Slowly	Race Car Blues	Australia	(57 in 2019)
16	The Weeknd	After Hours	Canada	53, (71 in 2019)
17	Joji	Nectar	Japan	59, 62, 98
18	King Gizzard & the Lizard Wizard	K.G.	Australia	DNC
19	Cosmo's Midnight	Yesteryear	Australia	83, (99 in 2019)
20	Cub Sport	Like Nirvana	Australia	DNC
