= Scarlett Johansson on screen and stage =

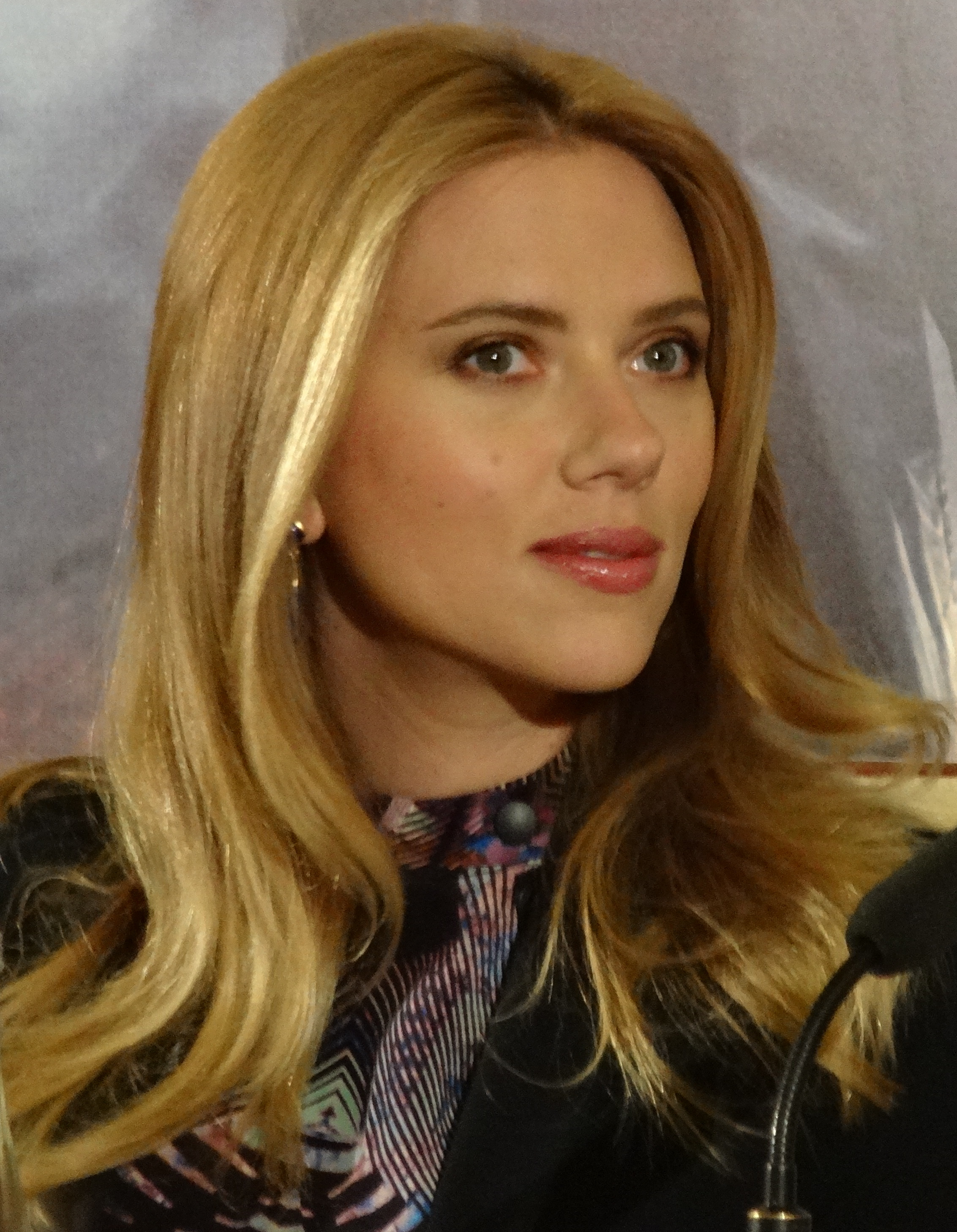
Johansson at an event for Captain America: The Winter Soldier in 2014

American actress Scarlett Johansson made her debut in the 1994 comedy-drama North. Her first lead role was as the 11-year-old sister of a pregnant teenager in Manny & Lo (1996), for which she received a nomination for the Independent Spirit Award for Best Female Lead. Johansson starred in Robert Redford's drama The Horse Whisperer (1998), and appeared in the black comedy Ghost World (2001). Two years later, Johansson played a young woman in a listless marriage in the Sofia Coppola-directed Lost in Translation, and also played a servant in Dutch painter Johannes Vermeer's household in Girl with a Pearl Earring with Colin Firth. She was nominated at the 61st Golden Globe Awards for both films, and received the BAFTA Award for Best Actress in a Leading Role for the former.

Two years later, Johansson starred in Woody Allen's psychological thriller Match Point, for which she garnered a nomination for the Golden Globe Award for Best Supporting Actress – Motion Picture. In 2006, she appeared in Christopher Nolan's psychological thriller The Prestige, and played a journalism student in Allen's Scoop. In the same year, Johansson made her first appearance as host of the television variety show Saturday Night Live, which she has since hosted a further five times as of 2019. Two years later, Johansson starred in Allen's romantic comedy-drama Vicky Cristina Barcelona with Javier Bardem and Penelope Cruz, and portrayed Queen of England Anne Boleyn's sister Mary in the historical drama The Other Boleyn Girl (2008) with Natalie Portman and Eric Bana. She received the Tony Award for Best Featured Actress in a Play for her Broadway debut performance in the 2010 revival of Arthur Miller's A View from the Bridge.

She played Black Widow in the Marvel Cinematic Universe (MCU) superhero film Iron Man 2 (2010). Johansson reprised the role in the Joss Whedon-directed The Avengers in 2012. The following year, she starred in the Broadway revival of the Tennessee Williams play Cat on a Hot Tin Roof with Ciarán Hinds, and voiced an artificially intelligent virtual assistant in Spike Jonze's Her with Joaquin Phoenix. Johansson appeared as Black Widow in the MCU superhero film Captain America: The Winter Soldier, its sequel Captain America: Civil War, Avengers: Age of Ultron, Avengers: Infinity War, and Avengers: Endgame—the lattermost is the second-highest-grossing film of all time. Johansson played a woman going through a divorce in Noah Baumbach's comedy-drama Marriage Story with Adam Driver, and a mother who hides a Jewish girl in Nazi Germany in Taika Waititi's satirical black comedy Jojo Rabbit (both in 2019). She received a nomination for the Academy Award for Best Actress for the former and a nomination in the Best Supporting Actress category for the latter.

== Film ==
Key
†	Denotes films that have not yet been released

Year	Title	Role	Notes	Ref.
1994	North	Laura Nelson		
1995	Just Cause	Katie Armstrong		
1996	If Lucy Fell	Emily		
1996	Manny & Lo	Amanda "Manny"		
1997	Fall	Little Girl		
1997	Home Alone 3	Molly Pruitt		
1998	The Horse Whisperer	Grace MacLean		
1999	My Brother the Pig	Kathy Caldwell		
2001	The Man Who Wasn't There	Rachel "Birdy" Abundas		
2001	Ghost World	Rebecca Doppelmeyer		
2001	An American Rhapsody	Young Suzanne Sandor		
2002	Eight Legged Freaks	Ashley Parker		
2003	Lost in Translation	Charlotte		
2003	Girl with a Pearl Earring	Griet		
2004	The Perfect Score	Francesca Curtis		
2004	A Love Song for Bobby Long	Purslan "Pursy" Hominy Will		
2004	A Good Woman	Meg Windermere		
2004	The SpongeBob SquarePants Movie	Princess Mindy	Voice role	
2004	In Good Company	Alex Foreman		
2005	Match Point	Nola Rice		
2005	The Island	Jordan Two Delta / Sarah Jordan		
2006	Scoop	Sondra Pransky		
2006	The Black Dahlia	Kay Lake		
2006	The Prestige	Olivia Wenscombe		
2007	The Nanny Diaries	Annie Braddock		
2008	The Other Boleyn Girl	Mary Boleyn		
2008	Vicky Cristina Barcelona	Cristina		
2008	The Spirit	Silken Floss		
2009	He's Just Not That Into You	Anna		
2009	These Vagabond Shoes	—N/a	Short film; director and writer	
2010	Iron Man 2	Natasha Romanoff / Black Widow		
2011	The Whale	—N/a	Executive producer	
2011	We Bought a Zoo	Kelly Foster		
2012	The Avengers	Natasha Romanoff / Black Widow		
2012	Hitchcock	Janet Leigh		
2013	Don Jon	Barbara Sugarman		
2013	Under the Skin	Laura		
2013	Her	Samantha	Voice role	
2014	Chef	Molly		
2014	Lucy	Lucy Miller		
2014	Captain America: The Winter Soldier	Natasha Romanoff / Black Widow		
2015	Avengers: Age of Ultron	Natasha Romanoff / Black Widow		
2015	American Express Unstaged: Ellie Goulding	—N/a	Concert film; director	
2016	Captain America: Civil War	Natasha Romanoff / Black Widow		
2016	Hail, Caesar!	DeeAnna Moran		
2016	The Jungle Book	Kaa	Voice role	
2016	Sing	Ash	Voice role	
2017	Ghost in the Shell	Major Mira Killian / Motoko Kusanagi		
2017	Rough Night	Jessica "Jess" Thayer		
2017	Thor: Ragnarok	Natasha Romanoff / Black Widow	Archive footage	
2018	Isle of Dogs	Nutmeg	Voice role	
2018	Avengers: Infinity War	Natasha Romanoff / Black Widow		
2019	Captain Marvel	Natasha Romanoff / Black Widow	Uncredited cameo	
2019	Avengers: Endgame	Natasha Romanoff / Black Widow		
2019	Marriage Story	Nicole Barber		
2019	Jojo Rabbit	Rosie Betzler		
2021	Black Widow	Natasha Romanoff / Black Widow	Also executive producer	
2021	Sing 2	Ash	Voice role	
2023	Catching Fire: The Story of Anita Pallenberg	Anita Pallenberg	Documentary film; voice role	
2023	Asteroid City	Midge Campbell / Mercedes Ford		
2023	My Mother's Wedding	Katherine		
2024	Fly Me to the Moon	Kelly Jones	Also producer	
2024	Transformers One	Elita-1	Voice role	
2024	Sing: Thriller	Ash	Short film; voice role	
2025	The Phoenician Scheme	Cousin Hilda		
2025	Eleanor the Great	—N/a	Director and producer	
2025	Jurassic World Rebirth	Zora Bennett		
2026	Paper Tiger	Hester Pearl		
2026	Ray Gunn	Venus Nova	Voice role	
2027	The Exorcist: Martyrs †	Detective Julie Miller	Post-production	
2027	Scapegoat †	TBA	Filming	
2028	The Batman: Part II †	Gilda Dent	Filming	

== Television ==
Year(s)	Title	Role(s)	Notes	Ref.
1995	The Client	Jenna Halliwell	Episode: "Pilot"	
2004	Entourage	Herself	Episode: "New York"; Cameo	
2005–2008	Robot Chicken	Various voices	6 episodes	
2006–2025	Saturday Night Live	Host / Various characters	14 episodes (Host of 7 episodes)	
2014	HitRecord on TV	Olivia	Episode: "Re: Games"; Animated short film "Two Player Game"; Voice role	
2021	Marvel Studios: Assembled	Herself	Episode: "The Making of Black Widow"	
2023	StoryBots: Answer Time	Ms. Astronaut	Episode: "Moon"	

== Stage ==
Year	Title	Role	Venue	Date	Ref(s)
2010	A View from the Bridge	Catherine	Cort Theatre	January 24 − April 4	
2013	Cat on a Hot Tin Roof	Margaret	Richard Rodgers Theatre	January 17 − March 30	
2017	Our Town	Emily Webb	Fox Theatre	November 6	

== Video games ==
Year	Title	Role(s)	Notes	Ref(s)
2004	The SpongeBob SquarePants Movie	Princess Mindy (voice)	Console and PC versions	

== Music videos ==
Year	Title	Artist(s)	Ref(s)
2003	"Girl with a Pearl"	Truman	
2006	"When the Deal Goes Down"	Bob Dylan	
2007	"What Goes Around... Comes Around"	Justin Timberlake	
2008	"Yes We Can"	will.i.am	
2009	"Relator"	Pete Yorn and Scarlett Johansson	
2018	"Bad Dreams"	Pete Yorn and Scarlett Johansson	

== See also ==
- Scarlett Johansson discography
- List of awards and nominations received by Scarlett Johansson
