= From Paris with Love =

From Paris with Love may refer to:

- From Paris with Love (film), 2010 action film
- From Paris with Love (album), 2002 album by The Skatalites
- From Paris with Love (L.U.V.), 2002 album by New York Dolls
