= USA Harvest =

USA Harvest is a charity organization founded in Louisville, Kentucky, in 1987. Volunteers pick up surplus food from restaurants, hotels, hospitals, and various other food suppliers and deliver it to missions, soup kitchens, shelters and people in need.

The Goo Goo Dolls used to pick up food in their concerts in benefit of the organization. Actress Scarlett Johansson auctioned off her used facial tissue on eBay with proceeds benefitting the charity. The tissue earned US$5,300
