= Grayson Capps =

American singer-songwriter

- Born: Opelika, Alabama, United States
- Genres: Americana, blues rock
- Occupation: Singer-songwriter
- Years active: Early 1990s–present
- Labels: Hyena, Ruf, Royal Potato Family, Appaloosa

Grayson Capps (born in Opelika, Alabama, United States) is an American Americana and blues rock singer-songwriter.

== Early life ==
Capps was born in Opelika, Alabama, to parents who were students at Auburn University. He was raised in Brewton, Alabama, as a child, but moved to Fairhope Alabama for high school. He became interested in theater when in Fairhope, Alabama, and received a degree in theater from Tulane University. He stayed in New Orleans until Hurricane Katrina.

== Musical career ==
In the early 1990s, while a student at Tulane, Capps started a band called The House Levelers; the band's music has been described as "thrash-folk". Also while at Tulane, Capps started a blues-rock band called Stavin' Chain. This band released one eponymous album before disbanding. In 2004, several of Capps' songs appeared on the soundtrack of the film A Love Song for Bobby Long, which was based on a novel written by Capps' father. In 2011, Capps and his band the Lost Cause Minstrels released an album, also called Lost Cause Minstrels, on Royal Potato Family Records.

Capps released his first solo album, If You Knew My Mind, in 2005 on Hyena Records. His second solo album, Wail & Ride, was released in 2006 on the same label, followed by Rott & Roll in 2008. Rott & Roll was recorded with a band known as the Stumpknockers.

Scarlett Roses was released in December 2017. AllMusic noted that "Scarlett Roses is the roots rock record we've been waiting for from Capps."

Capps released South Front Street a career retrospective in 2020. Upon its release AmericanaUK called Capps, "The thinking-man’s songwriter, the troubadours troubadour."

== Personal life ==
Capps is married to Trina Shoemaker, a recording engineer from Fairhope. They have a son together; Capps also has a daughter from a previous relationship. As of 2013, Capps and his family lived in Mobile, Alabama.

== Discography ==
- If You Knew My Mind (Hyena, 2005)
- Wail & Ride (Hyena, 2006)
- Stavin' Chain (Ruf Records, 2007)
- Songbones (Hyena, 2007)
- Rott & Roll (Hyena, 2008)
- The Lost Cause Minstrels (Royal Potato Family, 2011)
- Willie Sugarcapps

(Royal Potato Family, 2013)

- Paradise Right Here Willie Sugarcapps (Royal Potato Family, 2015)
- Love Songs, Mermaids and Grappa (Appaloosa, 2015)
- Scarlett Roses (Royal Potato Family, 2017)
- South Front Street (Royal Potato Family, 2019)
- Heartbreak, Misery & Death (Royal Potato Family, 2024)
