= List of awards and nominations received by Scarlett Johansson =

Scarlett Johansson awards and nominations
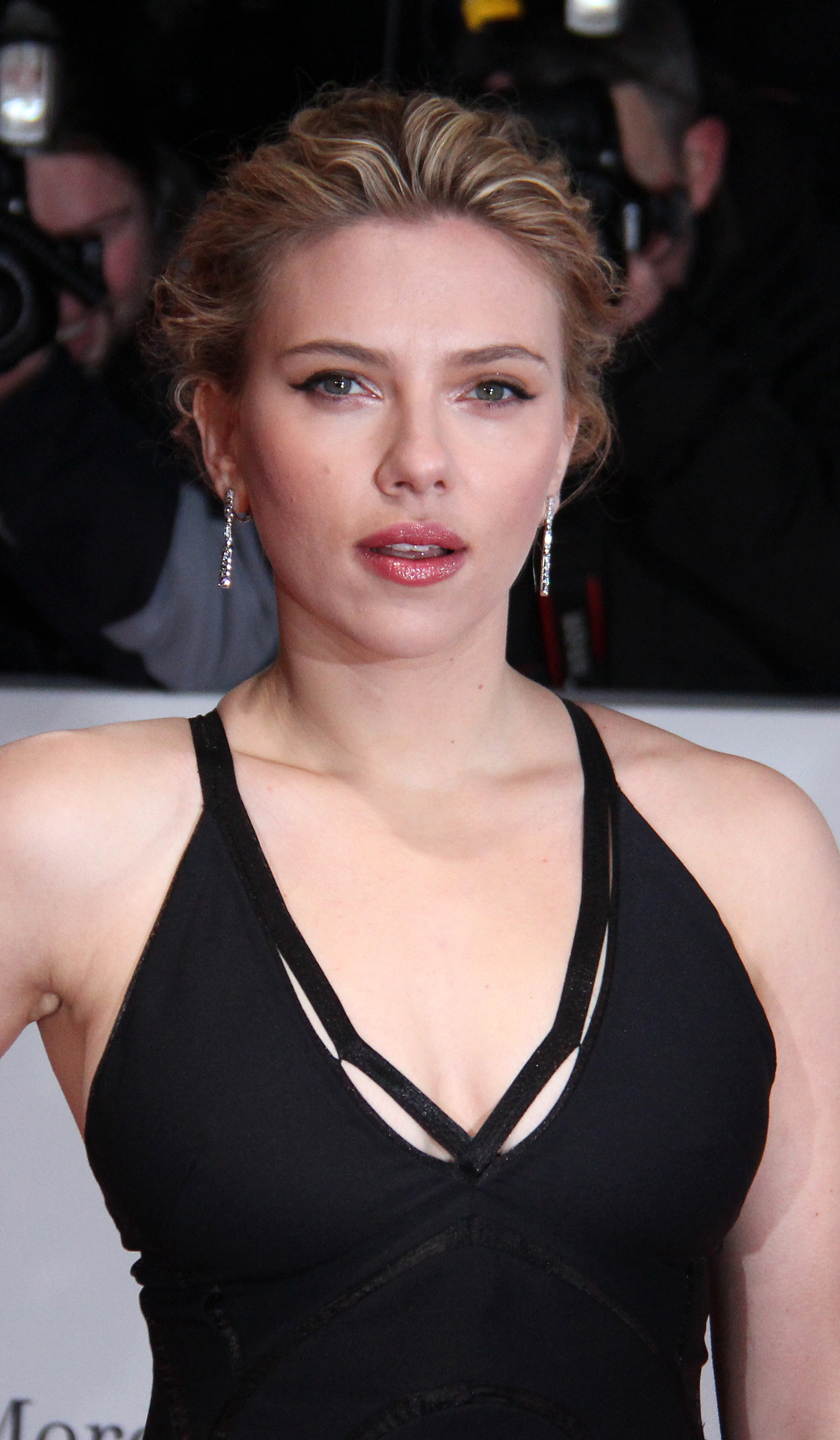
- Johansson at the 2012 Goldene Kamera Awards
Awards and nominations
Award	Wins	Nominations
Academy Awards	0	2
Actor Awards	0	3
BAFTA Awards	1	4
Critics' Choice Awards	0	7
Golden Globe Awards	0	5
Tony Awards	1	1

Totals (Note: Certain award groups do not simply award one winner. They acknowledge several different recipients, have runners-up, and have third place. Since this is a specific recognition and is different from losing an award, runner-up mentions are considered wins in this award tally. For simplification and to avoid errors, each award in this list has been presumed to have had a prior nomination.)
- Wins: 42
- Nominations: 119

Scarlett Johansson is an American actress who has received various accolades including a BAFTA Award and a Tony Award as well as nominations for two Academy Awards, seven Critics' Choice Movie Awards, five Golden Globe Awards, and three Screen Actors Guild Awards. She received a star on the Hollywood Walk of Fame in 2012 and an Honorary César in 2014 for her contributions to the motion picture industry.

For Johansson's first leading role in Manny & Lo (1996), she was nominated for the Independent Spirit Award for Best Female Lead. Johansson had her breakthrough in 2003 with two critically acclaimed roles in the films Lost in Translation and Girl with a Pearl Earring, both of which earned her nominations for the BAFTA Award for Best Actress in a Leading Role and Golden Globes for Best Actress. (Note: The former was nominated in the musical or comedy category while the latter was nominated in the drama category.) Her two BAFTA nominations that year made her the fifth actor to be double nominated in the same category in the same year as well as the first to have neither performance recognized at the Oscars. She won the BAFTA for Lost in Translation. (Note: With this win, Johansson also gained the distinction of being the first winner in the category since Maggie Smith in 1988 to not receive a nomination for the corresponding Oscar that year. Since Johansson, only Joanna Scanlan has achieved such feat.) Since 2010, Johansson has received one People's Choice Award and two Teen Choice Awards for playing the Marvel Cinematic Universe (MCU) character Natasha Romanoff / Black Widow.

For her role as a woman going through a coast-to-coast divorce in the Noah Baumbach relationship drama Marriage Story (2019), she was nominated for the Academy Award for Best Actress, BAFTA Award for Best Actress in a Leading Role, Golden Globe Award for Best Actress in a Motion Picture – Drama, and Screen Actors Guild Award for Outstanding Performance by a Female Actor in a Leading Role. The same year she played a caring mother in Taika Waititi's comedy-drama Jojo Rabbit. The role earned her nominations for the Academy Award for Best Supporting Actress, BAFTA Award for Best Actress in a Supporting Role, and Screen Actors Guild Award for Outstanding Cast in a Motion Picture.

On stage, Johansson made her Broadway debut starring as Catherine, a young Italian girl in the revival of the Arthur Miller play A View from the Bridge (2010), for which she won the Tony Award for Best Featured Actress in a Play and the Theatre World Award for Outstanding Stage Debut Performance, and was nominated for the Drama Desk Award for Outstanding Featured Actress in a Play.

== Major associations ==
=== Academy Awards ===
Year	Category	Nominated work	Result	Ref.
2020	Best Actress	Marriage Story	Nominated	
2020	Best Supporting Actress	Jojo Rabbit	Nominated	

=== BAFTA Awards ===
Year	Category	Nominated work	Result	Ref.
British Academy Film Awards
2004	Best Actress in a Leading Role	Lost in Translation	Won	
2004	Best Actress in a Leading Role	Girl with a Pearl Earring	Nominated	
2020	Best Actress in a Leading Role	Marriage Story	Nominated	
2020	Best Actress in a Supporting Role	Jojo Rabbit	Nominated	

=== Golden Globe Awards ===
Year	Category	Nominated work	Result	Ref.
2004	Best Actress – Motion Picture Comedy or Musical	Lost in Translation	Nominated	
2004	Best Actress in a Motion Picture – Drama	Girl with a Pearl Earring	Nominated	
2005	Best Actress in a Motion Picture – Drama	A Love Song for Bobby Long	Nominated	
2006	Best Supporting Actress – Motion Picture	Match Point	Nominated	
2020	Best Actress in a Motion Picture – Drama	Marriage Story	Nominated	

=== Screen Actors Guild Awards ===
Year	Category	Nominated work	Result	Ref.
2020	Outstanding Actress in a Leading Role	Marriage Story	Nominated	
2020	Outstanding Actress in a Supporting Role	Jojo Rabbit	Nominated	
2020	Outstanding Cast in a Motion Picture	Jojo Rabbit	Nominated	

=== Tony Awards ===
Year	Category	Nominated work	Result	Ref.
2010	Best Featured Actress in a Play	A View from the Bridge	Won	

== Other associations ==
Award	Year (Note: Indicates the year of ceremony.)	Category	Nominated work	Result	Ref.
AACTA International Awards	2020	Best Actress	Marriage Story	Nominated	
American Comedy Awards	2014	Best Comedy Supporting Actress – Film	Her	Nominated	
Alliance of Women Film Journalists	2008	Best Seduction (Note: shared with Penélope Cruz)	Vicky Cristina Barcelona	Won	
Alliance of Women Film Journalists	2013	Best Depiction of Nudity, Sexuality, or Seduction (Note: shared with Joaquin Phoenix)	Her	Won	
Alliance of Women Film Journalists	2013	Best Supporting Actress	Her	Nominated	
Alliance of Women Film Journalists	2014	Best Female Action Star	Lucy	Nominated	
Alliance of Women Film Journalists	2014	Best Depiction of Nudity, Sexuality, or Seduction	Under the Skin	Won	
Alliance of Women Film Journalists	2020	Best Actress	Marriage Story	Nominated	
Audie Awards	2010	Audiobook of the Year	Nelson Mandela's Favorite African Folktales	Won	
Audie Awards	2010	Multi-Voiced Performance	Nelson Mandela's Favorite African Folktales	Won	
Austin Film Critics Association	2013	Special Honorary Award	Her	Won	
Austin Film Critics Association	2020	Best Actress	Marriage Story	Nominated	
Austin Film Critics Association	2020	Best Supporting Actress	Jojo Rabbit	Nominated	
Boston Society of Film Critics	2001	Best Supporting Actress	Ghost World	Runner-up	
Boston Society of Film Critics	2003	Best Actress	Lost in Translation	Won	
British Independent Film Awards	2004	Best Actress	Girl with a Pearl Earring	Nominated	
British Independent Film Awards	2013	Best Actress	Under the Skin	Nominated	
Chicago Film Critics Association	1998	Most Promising Actress	The Horse Whisperer	Nominated	
Chicago Film Critics Association	2005	Best Supporting Actress	Match Point	Won	
Chicago Film Critics Association	2013	Best Supporting Actress	Her	Nominated	
Chicago Film Critics Association	2014	Best Actress	Under the Skin	Nominated	
Chicago Film Critics Association	2019	Best Actress	Marriage Story	Nominated	
Critics' Choice Movie Awards	2004	Best Supporting Actress	Lost in Translation	Nominated	
Critics' Choice Movie Awards	2014	Best Supporting Actress	Her	Nominated	
Critics' Choice Movie Awards	2015	Best Actress in an Action Movie	Lucy	Nominated	
Critics' Choice Movie Awards	2016	Best Actress in an Action Movie	Captain America: Civil War	Nominated	
Critics' Choice Movie Awards	2020	Best Actress	Marriage Story	Nominated	
Critics' Choice Movie Awards	2020	Best Acting Ensemble	Marriage Story	Nominated	
Critics' Choice Movie Awards	2020	Best Supporting Actress	Jojo Rabbit	Nominated	
Critics' Choice Super Awards	2022	Best Actress in a Superhero Movie	Black Widow	Nominated	
César Awards	2014	Honorary César	—N/a	Won	
Drama Desk Awards	2010	Outstanding Featured Actress in a Play	A View from the Bridge	Nominated	
Drama League Awards	2010	Distinguished Performance	A View from the Bridge	Nominated	
Dorian Awards	2020	Film Performance of the Year – Actress	Marriage Story	Nominated	
Dallas–Fort Worth Film Critics Association	2005	Best Supporting Actress	Match Point	Runner-up	
Dallas–Fort Worth Film Critics Association	2019	Best Actress	Marriage Story	Won	
Detroit Film Critics Society	2013	Best Supporting Actress	Her	Won	
Detroit Film Critics Society	2014	Best Actress	Under the Skin	Nominated	
Detroit Film Critics Society	2019	Best Actress	Marriage Story	Won	
Detroit Film Critics Society	2019	Best Supporting Actress	Jojo Rabbit	Nominated	
Dublin Film Critics' Circle	2014	Best Actress	Under the Skin	Nominated	
Dublin Film Critics' Circle	2019	Best Actress	Marriage Story	Won	
Florida Film Critics Circle	2019	Best Actress	Marriage Story	Won	
Florida Film Critics Circle	2019	Best Supporting Actress	Jojo Rabbit	Nominated	
Gotham Independent Film Awards	2008	Best Ensemble Cast	Vicky Cristina Barcelona	Won	
Gotham Independent Film Awards	2013	Best Actress	Don Jon	Nominated	
Gotham Independent Film Awards	2014	Best Actress	Under the Skin	Nominated	
Georgia Film Critics Association	2014	Best Actress	Under the Skin	Nominated	
Georgia Film Critics Association	2020	Best Actress	Marriage Story	Nominated	
Hollywood Critics Association	2020	Best Actress	Marriage Story	Nominated	
Houston Film Critics Society	2020	Best Actress	Marriage Story	Nominated	
Houston Film Critics Society	2020	Best Supporting Actress	Jojo Rabbit	Nominated	
Indiewire Critics' Poll	2014	Best Actress	Under the Skin	Runner-up	
Indiewire Critics' Poll	2019	Best Actress	Marriage Story	Runner-up	
Independent Spirit Awards	1997	Best Female Lead	Manny & Lo	Nominated	
Independent Spirit Awards	2020	Robert Altman Award	Marriage Story	Won	
London Film Critics Circle	2003	Actress of the Year	Girl with a Pearl Earring	Nominated	
London Film Critics Circle	2014	Actress of the Year	Under the Skin	Nominated	
London Film Critics Circle	2020	Actress of the Year	Marriage Story	Nominated	
Los Angeles Film Critics Association	2003	New Generation Award	Girl with a Pearl Earring / Lost in Translation	Won	
MTV Movie & TV Awards	2004	Best Female Breakthrough Performance	Lost in Translation	Nominated	
MTV Movie & TV Awards	2013	Best Fight (Note: shared with Robert Downey Jr., Chris Evans, Mark Ruffalo, Chris Hemsworth, Jeremy Renner and Tom Hiddleston)	The Avengers	Won	
MTV Movie & TV Awards	2014	Best Kiss (Note: shared with Joseph Gordon-Levitt)	Don Jon	Nominated	
MTV Movie & TV Awards	2015	Best Female Performance	Lucy	Nominated	
MTV Movie & TV Awards	2015	Best Kiss (Note: shared with Chris Evans)	Captain America: The Winter Soldier	Nominated	
MTV Movie & TV Awards	2018	Best Fight (Note: shared with Danai Gurira, Elizabeth Olsen and Carrie Coon)	Avengers: Infinity War	Nominated	
MTV Movie & TV Awards	2021	MTV Generation Award	—N/a	Won	
MTV Movie & TV Awards	2022	Best Hero	Black Widow	Won	
National Society of Film Critics	2014	Best Actress	Lucy / Under the Skin	Nominated	
New York Film Critics Online	2003	Best Supporting Actress	Lost in Translation	Won	
Newport Beach Film Festival	2025	Legend & Groundbreaker Award	Life's work	Honored	
Nickelodeon Kids' Choice Awards	2013	Favorite Movie Actress	The Avengers	Nominated	
Nickelodeon Kids' Choice Awards	2013	Favorite Butt-Kicker	The Avengers	Nominated	
Nickelodeon Kids' Choice Awards	2015	Favorite Female Action Star	Captain America: The Winter Soldier	Nominated	
Nickelodeon Kids' Choice Awards	2016	Favorite Movie Actress	Avengers: Age of Ultron	Nominated	
Nickelodeon Kids' Choice Awards	2017	Favorite Movie Actress	Captain America: Civil War	Nominated	
Nickelodeon Kids' Choice Awards	2017	Favorite Butt-Kicker	Captain America: Civil War	Nominated	
Nickelodeon Kids' Choice Awards	2017	#Squad (shared with the cast)	Captain America: Civil War	Nominated	
Nickelodeon Kids' Choice Awards	2019	Favorite Movie Actress	Avengers: Infinity War	Nominated	
Nickelodeon Kids' Choice Awards	2019	Favorite Superhero	Avengers: Infinity War	Nominated	
Nickelodeon Kids' Choice Awards	2022	Favorite Movie Actress	Black Widow	Nominated	
Nickelodeon Kids' Choice Awards	2022	Favorite Voice from an Animated Movie	Sing 2	Won	
Nickelodeon Kids' Choice Awards	2025	Favorite Female Voice From An Animated Movie	Transformers One	Nominated	
Online Film Critics Society	2001	Best Supporting Actress	Ghost World	Nominated	
Online Film Critics Society	2003	Best Actress	Lost in Translation	Nominated	
Online Film Critics Society	2013	Best Supporting Actress	Her	Nominated	
Online Film Critics Society	2020	Best Actress	Marriage Story	Nominated	
People's Choice Awards	2007	Favorite Leading Lady	—N/a	Nominated	
People's Choice Awards	2013	Favorite Movie Actress	—N/a	Nominated	
People's Choice Awards	2013	Favorite Face of Heroism	—N/a	Nominated	
People's Choice Awards	2013	Favorite On-Screen Chemistry (Note: shared with Jeremy Renner)	The Avengers	Nominated	
People's Choice Awards	2014	Favorite Comedic Movie Actress	—N/a	Nominated	
People's Choice Awards	2014	Favorite Movie Actress	—N/a	Nominated	
People's Choice Awards	2015	Favorite Action Movie Actress	—N/a	Nominated	
People's Choice Awards	2015	Favorite Movie Actress	—N/a	Nominated	
People's Choice Awards	2015	Favorite Movie Duo	Captain America: The Winter Soldier	Nominated	
People's Choice Awards	2016	Favorite Action Movie Actress	—N/a	Nominated	
People's Choice Awards	2016	Favorite Movie Actress	—N/a	Nominated	
People's Choice Awards	2017	Favorite Action Movie Actress	—N/a	Nominated	
People's Choice Awards	2017	Favorite Movie Actress	—N/a	Nominated	
People's Choice Awards	2018	Best Female Movie Star	Avengers: Infinity War	Won	
People's Choice Awards	2019	Best Female Movie Star	Avengers: Endgame	Nominated	
Palm Springs International Film Festival	2004	Rising Star Award	Girl with a Pearl Earring / Lost in Translation	Won	
Rome Film Festival	2013	Best Actress	Her	Won	
Satellite Awards	2004	Best Supporting Actress – Motion Picture Musical or Comedy	Lost in Translation	Nominated	
Satellite Awards	2019	Best Actress – Motion Picture Drama	Marriage Story	Won	
Saturn Awards	2011	Best Supporting Actress	Iron Man 2	Nominated	
Saturn Awards	2014	Best Supporting Actress	Her	Won	
Saturn Awards	2015	Best Supporting Actress	Captain America: The Winter Soldier	Nominated	
Saturn Awards	2017	Best Supporting Actress	Captain America: Civil War	Nominated	
Saturn Awards	2019	Best Supporting Actress	Avengers: Endgame	Nominated	
Scream Awards	2010	Best Science Fiction Actress	Iron Man 2	Won	
San Diego Film Critics Society	2019	Best Actress	Marriage Story	Nominated	
San Francisco Bay Area Film Critics Circle	2014	Best Actress	Under the Skin	Nominated	
San Francisco Bay Area Film Critics Circle	2019	Best Actress	Marriage Story	Nominated	
San Francisco Bay Area Film Critics Circle	2019	Best Supporting Actress	Jojo Rabbit	Nominated	
Seattle Film Critics Society	2013	Best Supporting Actress	Her	Won	
Seattle Film Critics Society	2019	Best Actress	Marriage Story	Nominated	
St. Louis Film Critics Association	2013	Best Supporting Actress	Her	Nominated	
St. Louis Film Critics Association	2013	Best Scene (Note: shared with Joaquin Phoenix for the sex scene)	Her	Nominated	
St. Louis Film Critics Association	2019	Best Actress	Marriage Story	Won	
St. Louis Film Critics Association	2019	Best Supporting Actress	Jojo Rabbit	Nominated	
Santa Barbara International Film Festival	2020	Outstanding Performers of the Year Award (Note: shared with Adam Driver)	Marriage Story	Won	
Toronto Film Critics Association	2001	Best Supporting Actress	Ghost World	Won	
Teen Choice Awards	2005	Choice Movie Actress – Drama	In Good Company	Nominated	
Teen Choice Awards	2007	Choice Movie Actress – Drama	The Black Dahlia / The Prestige	Nominated	
Teen Choice Awards	2008	Choice Movie Actress – Drama	The Other Boleyn Girl	Nominated	
Teen Choice Awards	2010	Choice Movie Actress: Sci-Fi	Iron Man 2	Nominated	
Teen Choice Awards	2010	Choice Female Hottie	—N/a	Nominated	
Teen Choice Awards	2012	Choice Movie Actress – Drama	We Bought a Zoo	Nominated	
Teen Choice Awards	2012	Choice Movie Actress – Sci-Fi/Fantasy	The Avengers	Nominated	
Teen Choice Awards	2012	Choice Summer Movie Star – Female	The Avengers	Nominated	
Teen Choice Awards	2014	Choice Movie Actress – Sci-Fi/Fantasy	Captain America: The Winter Soldier	Nominated	
Teen Choice Awards	2014	Choice Movie – Liplock	Captain America: The Winter Soldier	Nominated	
Teen Choice Awards	2015	Choice Movie Actress – Sci-Fi/Fantasy	Avengers: Age of Ultron	Nominated	
Teen Choice Awards	2016	Choice Movie Actress – Sci-Fi/Fantasy	Captain America: Civil War	Nominated	
Teen Choice Awards	2016	Choice Movie – Chemistry (Note: shared with Paul Bettany, Chadwick Boseman, Don Cheadle and Robert Downey Jr.)	Captain America: Civil War	Nominated	
Teen Choice Awards	2018	Choice Action Movie Actress	Avengers: Infinity War	Won	
Teen Choice Awards	2019	Choice Action Movie Actress	Avengers: Endgame	Won	
Theatre World Awards	2010	Outstanding Stage Debut Performance	A View from the Bridge	Won	
Vancouver Film Critics Circle	2019	Best Actress	Marriage Story	Won	
Venice Film Festival	2003	Upstream Prize for Best Actress	Lost in Translation	Won	
Washington D.C. Area Film Critics Association	2013	Best Supporting Actress	Her	Nominated	
Washington D.C. Area Film Critics Association	2014	Best Actress	Under the Skin	Nominated	
Washington D.C. Area Film Critics Association	2019	Best Actress	Marriage Story	Nominated	
Washington D.C. Area Film Critics Association	2019	Best Supporting Actress	Jojo Rabbit	Nominated	
Women Film Critics Circle	2019	Best Actress	Marriage Story	Nominated	
Women Film Critics Circle	2019	Best Screen Couple	Marriage Story	Won	
Young Artist Awards	1999	Best Leading Young Actress	The Horse Whisperer	Nominated	
Young Artist Awards	2002	Best Leading Young Actress (Note: tied with Emma Watson)	An American Rhapsody	Won	
Young Artist Awards	2002	Best Ensemble in a Feature Film	An American Rhapsody	Won	
YoungStar Awards	1998	Best Young Actress in a Drama Film	The Horse Whisperer	Nominated	
