= Scarlett Johansson =

American actress (born 1984)

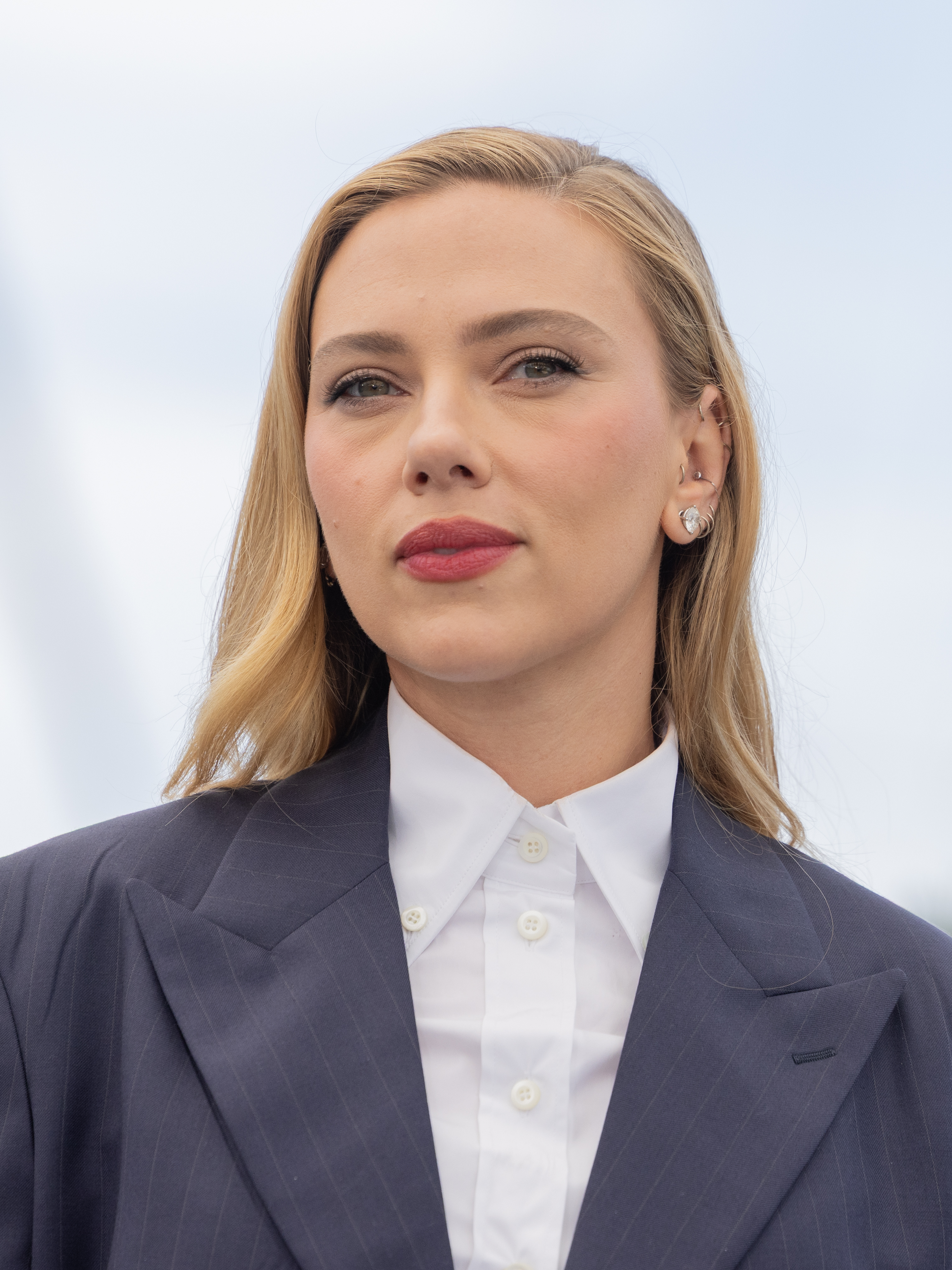
- Johansson in 2025
- Born: Scarlett Ingrid Johansson; November 22, 1984 (age 41); New York City, U.S.
- Citizenship: United States; Denmark
- Occupations: Actress; singer; producer; director
- Years active: 1994–present
- Works: Performances; discography
- Spouses: Ryan Reynolds (m. 2008; div. 2011); Romain Dauriac (m. 2014; div. 2017); Colin Jost (m. 2020)
- Children: 2
- Relatives: Ejner Johansson (grandfather)
- Awards: Full list

Scarlett Ingrid Johansson (/dʒoʊˈhænsən/; born November 22, 1984) is an American actress, singer, producer, and director. Her films as a leading actress have grossed over $15.4 billion worldwide, making her the third-highest-grossing actor in history. Her accolades include a British Academy Film Award and a Tony Award, as well as nominations for two Academy Awards and five Golden Globe Awards. She was the world's highest-paid actress in 2018, 2019, and 2025.

Johansson first appeared as a child actress on stage in an off-Broadway play. She made her film debut in the fantasy comedy North (1994) and gained early recognition for her roles in Manny & Lo (1996), The Horse Whisperer (1998), and Ghost World (2001). In 2003, she marked her transition to mature roles with acclaimed performances in Lost in Translation, for which she won the BAFTA Award for Best Actress, and Girl with a Pearl Earring. Her profile continued to grow with roles in A Love Song for Bobby Long (2004), The Prestige (2006), and the Woody Allen films Match Point (2005) and Vicky Cristina Barcelona (2008). During this period, she released the albums Anywhere I Lay My Head (2008), and Break Up (2009), both of which charted on the Billboard 200. Johansson also expanded into stage with starring roles in the Broadway revivals of A View from the Bridge (2010), for which she won the Tony Award for Best Featured Actress in a Play, and Cat on a Hot Tin Roof (2013).

Johansson achieved global stardom for portraying Natasha Romanoff / Black Widow in eight films across the Marvel Cinematic Universe (MCU), beginning with Iron Man 2 (2010) and culminating with her solo feature Black Widow (2021). During this period, Johansson also starred in the science fiction films Her (2013), Under the Skin (2013), and Lucy (2014). She received two simultaneous Academy Award nominations—Best Actress and Best Supporting Actress—for the respective performances as an actress going through a divorce in the drama Marriage Story (2019) and a single mother living in Nazi Germany in the satire Jojo Rabbit (2019), becoming one of the few actors to achieve this feat.

Time magazine named her on its Time 100 list of the most influential people in the world in 2021 and 2025. Labeled a sex symbol, Johansson has been referred to as one of the world's most attractive women by various media outlets. She is also a prominent brand endorser and supports several charitable causes.

== Early life and education ==
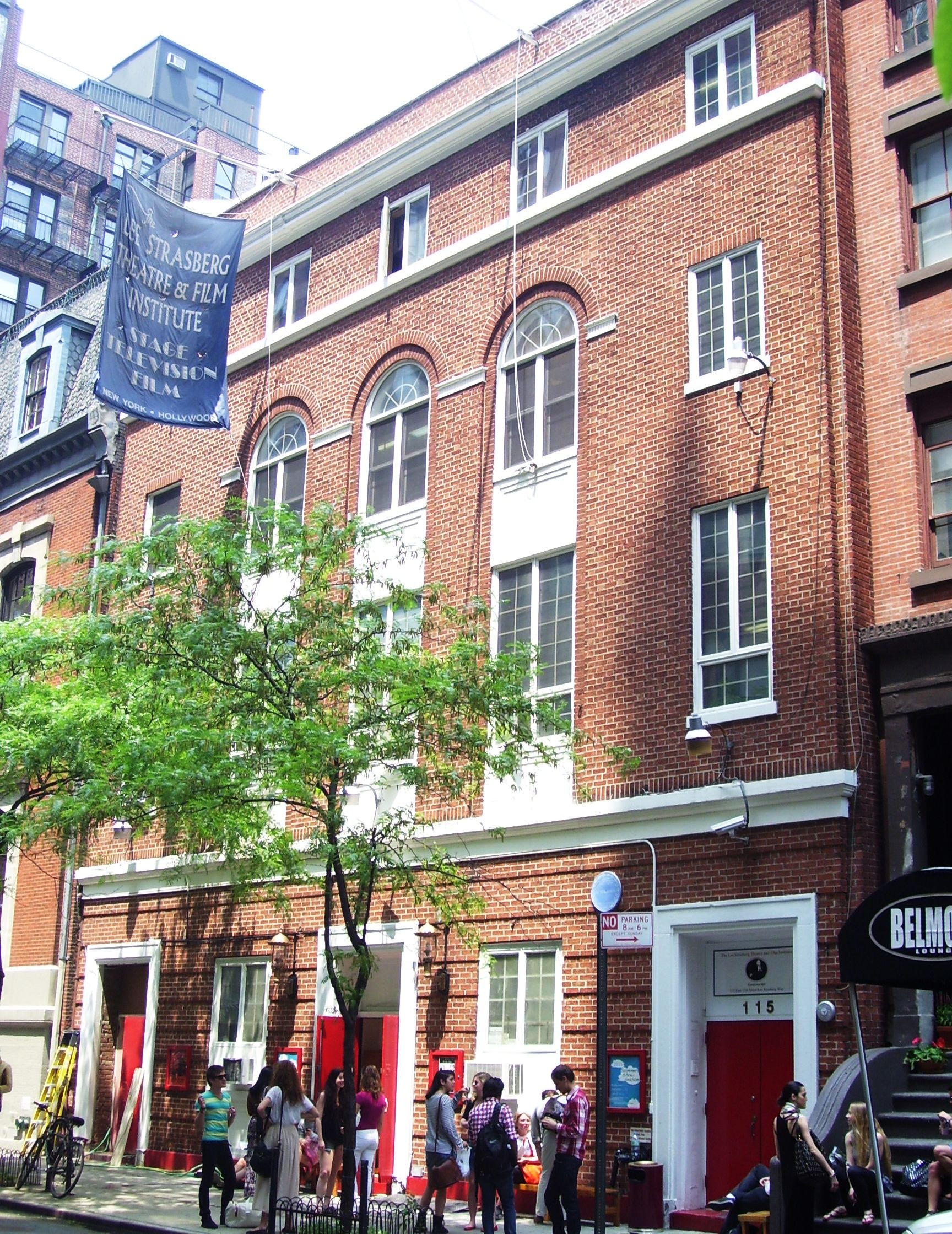
The Lee Strasberg Theatre and Film Institute, where Johansson learned to act as a child

Scarlett Ingrid Johansson was born on November 22, 1984, in the Manhattan borough of New York City. Johansson's father, Karsten Olaf Johansson, is an architect originally from Copenhagen, Denmark. Through him, she is granddaughter to Ejner Johansson, an art historian, screenwriter, and film director, whose own father was Swedish. Her mother, New Yorker Melanie Sloan, has worked as a producer. She comes from a Jewish family who fled Poland and Russia, originally surnamed Schlamberg; Johansson has referred to herself as Jewish. She has an older sister named Vanessa, who is also an actress, an older brother named Adrian, and a twin brother named Hunter. Johansson also has an older half-brother named Christian from her father's first marriage. She holds dual American and Danish citizenship. On a 2017 episode of PBS's Finding Your Roots, she discovered that her maternal great-grandfather's brother and extended family died in the Warsaw Ghetto during the Holocaust.

Johansson grew up on Manhattan's Lower East Side and attended PS 41, an elementary school in Greenwich Village, Manhattan. Her parents divorced when she was 13. She was particularly close to her maternal grandmother, Dorothy Sloan, a bookkeeper and schoolteacher, whom Johansson considered her best friend. Interested in a career in the spotlight from an early age, Johansson often put on song-and-dance routines for her family. She was particularly fond of musical theater and jazz hands. Johansson took lessons in tap dance and has said her parents were supportive of her career choice. She has described her childhood as very ordinary.

As a child, Johansson practiced acting by staring in the mirror until she made herself cry, wanting to be like Judy Garland in Meet Me in St. Louis (1944). At age seven, she was devastated when a talent agent signed one of her brothers instead of her, but later decided to become an actress anyway. After enrolling at the Lee Strasberg Theatre Institute and auditioning for commercials, Johansson soon lost interest, stating "I didn't want to promote Wonder Bread." She shifted her focus to film and theater, making her first stage appearance with two lines in the off-Broadway play Sophistry with Ethan Hawke. Around this time, Johansson began studying at the Professional Children's School, a private educational institution for aspiring child actors in Manhattan.

== Acting career ==
=== 1994–2002: Early work and breakthrough ===
At age nine, Johansson landed her first paid role as a sketch character on an episode of Late Night with Conan O'Brien. Later that year, she made her film debut as John Ritter's daughter in the fantasy comedy North (1994). She says that when she was on the film set, she knew intuitively what to do. She then played minor roles, such as the daughter of Sean Connery's and Kate Capshaw's characters in the mystery thriller Just Cause (1995), and an art student in If Lucy Fell (1996). Johansson's first leading role was as Amanda, the younger sister of a pregnant teenager who runs away from her foster home in Manny & Lo (1996) alongside Aleksa Palladino and her brother, Hunter. Her performance received positive reviews: one written for the San Francisco Chronicle noted, "[the film] grows on you, largely because of the charm of... Scarlett Johansson," while critic Mick LaSalle, writing for the same paper, commented on her "peaceful aura", and believed, "if she can get through puberty with that aura undisturbed, she could become an important actress." Johansson earned a nomination for the Independent Spirit Award for Best Lead Female for the role.

After appearing in minor roles in Fall and Home Alone 3 (both in 1997), Johansson attracted wider attention for her performance in the film The Horse Whisperer (1998), co-starring director Robert Redford. Based on the 1995 novel of the same name by Nicholas Evans, the drama tells the story of a talented horse trainer, who is hired to help an injured teenager (Johansson) and her horse back to health. Johansson received an "introducing" credit on this film, although it was her seventh role. On Johansson's maturity, Redford described her as "13 going on 30". Todd McCarthy of Variety commented that Johansson "convincingly conveys the awkwardness of her age and the inner pain of a carefree girl suddenly laid low by horrible happenstance". For the film, she was nominated for the Chicago Film Critics Association Award for Most Promising Actress. She believed the film changed many things in her life, realizing that acting is the ability to manipulate one's emotions. On finding good roles as a teenager, Johansson said it was hard for her, as adults wrote the scripts and they "portray kids like mall rats and not seriously... Kids and teenagers just aren't being portrayed with any real depth."

Johansson later appeared in My Brother the Pig (1999) and in the Coen brothers' neo-noir film The Man Who Wasn't There (2001). Her breakthrough came playing a cynical outcast in Terry Zwigoff's black comedy Ghost World (2001), an adaptation of Daniel Clowes' graphic novel of the same name. Johansson auditioned for the film via a tape from New York, and Zwigoff believed her to be a "unique, eccentric person, and right for that part". The film premiered at the 2001 Seattle International Film Festival; although a box office failure, it has since developed a cult status. Johansson was credited with "sensitivity and talent [that] belie her age" by an Austin Chronicle critic and won a Toronto Film Critics Association Award for Best Supporting Actress for her performance. With David Arquette, Johansson appeared in the horror comedy Eight Legged Freaks (2002) about spiders exposed to toxic waste, causing them to grow gigantic and begin killing. After graduating from Professional Children's School that year, she applied to New York University's Tisch School of the Arts, but was rejected and decided to focus on her film career.

=== 2003–2004: Transition to adult roles ===
Johansson transitioned from teen to adult roles with two films in 2003: the romantic comedy-drama Lost in Translation and the drama Girl with a Pearl Earring. In the former, directed by Sofia Coppola, she played Charlotte, a listless and lonely young wife, opposite Bill Murray. Coppola had first noticed Johansson in Manny & Lo, and compared her to a young Lauren Bacall; Coppola based the film's story on the relationship between Bacall and Humphrey Bogart in The Big Sleep (1946). Johansson found the experience of working with a female director different because of Coppola's ability to empathize with her. Made on a budget of $4 million, the film grossed $119 million at the box office and received critical acclaim. Roger Ebert described the lead actors' performances as "wonderful", and Entertainment Weekly wrote of Johansson's "embracing, restful serenity". The New York Times praised Johansson, aged 17 at the time of filming, for playing an older character.

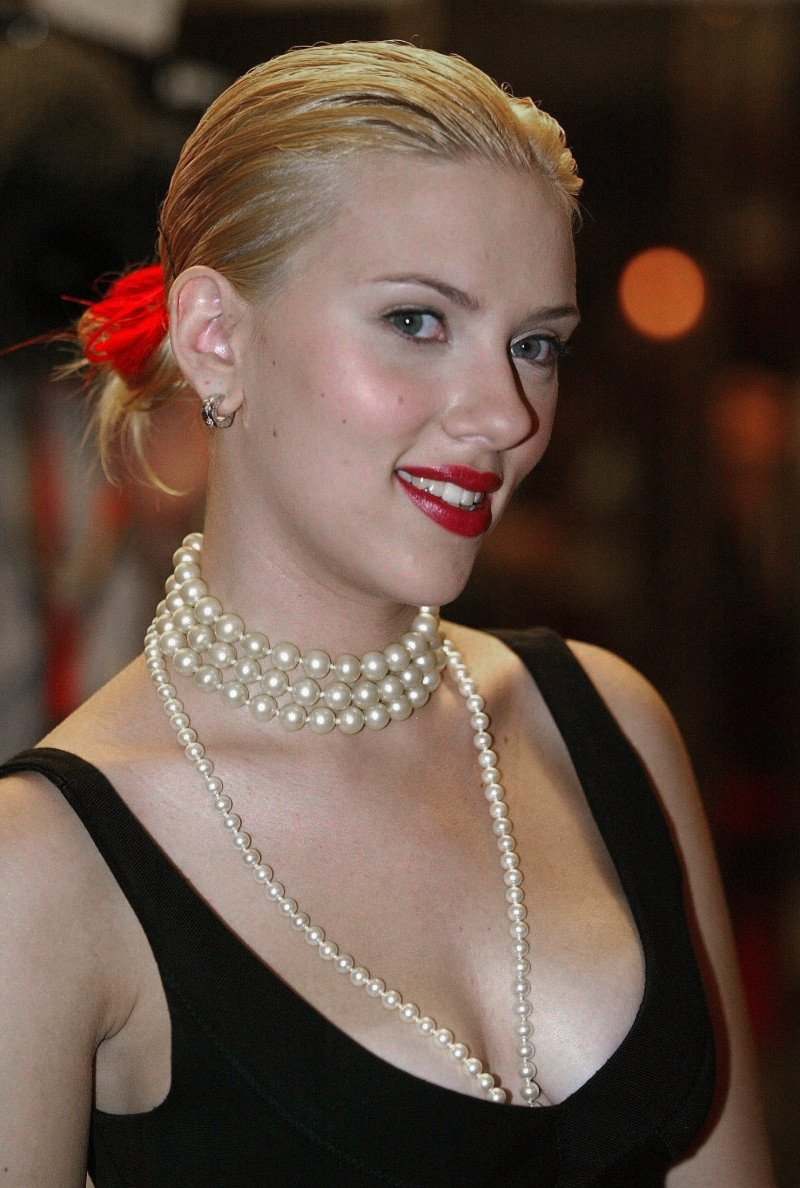
Johansson attending the premiere of Girl with a Pearl Earring at the 2003 Toronto International Film Festival

In Peter Webber's Girl with a Pearl Earring, which is based on the novel of the same name by Tracy Chevalier, Johansson played Griet, a young 17th-century servant in the household of the Dutch painter Johannes Vermeer (played by Colin Firth). Webber interviewed 150 actors before casting Johansson. Johansson found the character moving, but did not read the novel, as she thought it was better to approach the story with a fresh start. Girl with a Pearl Earring received positive reviews and was profitable. In his review for The New Yorker, Anthony Lane thought her presence kept the film "alive", writing, "She is often wordless and close to plain onscreen, but wait for the ardor with which she can summon a closeup and bloom under its gaze; this is her film, not Vermeer's, all the way." Owen Gleiberman of Entertainment Weekly noted her "nearly silent performance", remarking, "The interplay on her face of fear, ignorance, curiosity and sex is intensely dramatic." She was nominated for the BAFTA Award for Best Actress in a Leading Role and the Golden Globe for Best Actress (Note: Johansson was nominated for Best Actress in a Motion Picture Comedy or Musical for Lost in Translation and Best Actress in a Drama for Girl with a Pearl Earring.) for both films in 2003, winning the former for Lost in Translation.

Variety opined that Johansson's roles in Lost in Translation and Girl with a Pearl Earring established her as among the most versatile actresses of her generation. Johansson had five releases in 2004, three of which—the teen heist film The Perfect Score, the drama A Love Song for Bobby Long, and the drama A Good Woman—were critical and commercial failures. Co-starring with John Travolta, Johansson played a discontented teenager in A Love Song for Bobby Long, which is based on the novel Off Magazine Street by Ronald Everett Capps. David Rooney of Variety wrote that Johansson's and Travolta's performances rescued the film. Johansson earned a Golden Globe Award for Best Actress in a Drama nomination for her role.

In her fourth release in 2004, the live-action animated comedy The SpongeBob SquarePants Movie, Johansson voiced Princess Mindy, the daughter of King Neptune. She agreed to the project because of her love of cartoons, particularly The Ren & Stimpy Show. The film was her most commercially successful release that year. She would reprise her role as Mindy in the video game adaptation of the film. She followed it with In Good Company, a comedy-drama in which she plays a young woman who complicates her father's life when she dates his much younger boss. Reviews of the film were generally positive, describing it as "witty and charming". Ebert was impressed with Johansson's portrayal, writing that she "continues to employ the gravitational pull of quiet fascination".

=== 2005–2009: Collaborations with Woody Allen ===
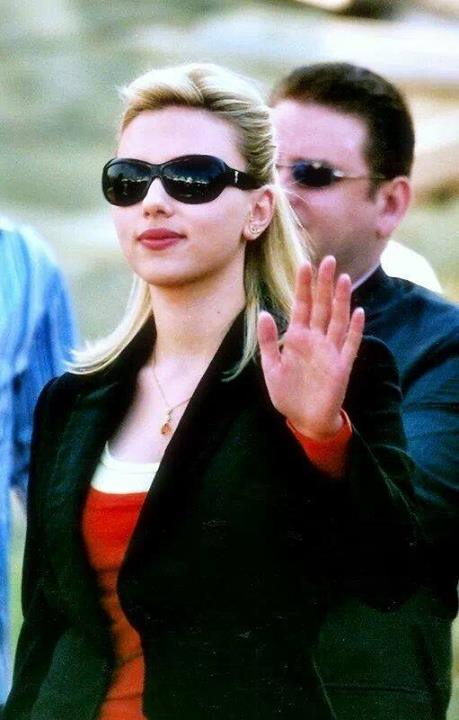
Johansson at the 2005 Cannes Film Festival

Johansson played Nola, an aspiring actress who begins an affair with a married man (played by Jonathan Rhys Meyers) in Woody Allen's drama Match Point in 2005. After replacing Kate Winslet with Johansson for the role, Allen changed the character's nationality from British to American. An admirer of Allen's films, Johansson liked the idea of working with him, but felt nervous her first day on the set. The New York Times was impressed with the performances of Johansson and Rhys Meyers, and LaSalle, writing for the San Francisco Chronicle, stated that Johansson "is a powerhouse from the word go", with a performance that "borders on astonishing". The film, a box office success, earned Johansson nominations for the Golden Globe and the Chicago Film Critics Association Award for Best Supporting Actress. Also in 2005, Johansson starred with Ewan McGregor in Michael Bay's science fiction film The Island, in dual roles as Sarah Jordan and her clone, Jordan Two Delta. Johansson found her filming schedule exhausting: she had to shoot for 14 hours a day, and she hit her head and injured herself. The film received mixed reviews and grossed $163 million against a $126 million budget.

Two of Johansson's 2006 films explored the world of stage magicians, both opposite Hugh Jackman. Allen cast her opposite Jackman and himself in the film Scoop (2006), in which she played a journalism student. The film was a modest worldwide box-office success but polarized critics. Ebert was critical of the film, but found Johansson "lovely as always", and LaSalle noted the freshness she brought to her part. She also appeared in Brian De Palma's The Black Dahlia, a film noir shot in Los Angeles and Bulgaria. Johansson later said she was a fan of De Palma and had wanted to work with him on the film but thought that she was unsuitable for the part. Anne Billson of The Daily Telegraph likewise found her miscast. However, CNN said she "takes to the pulpy period atmosphere as if it were oxygen".

Also in 2006, Johansson starred in the short film When the Deal Goes Down to accompany Bob Dylan's song "When the Deal Goes Down..." from the album Modern Times. Johansson had a supporting role of assistant and lover of Jackman's character, an aristocratic magician, in Christopher Nolan's mystery thriller The Prestige (2006). Nolan thought Johansson possessed "ambiguity" and a "shielded quality". She was fascinated with Nolan's directing methods and liked working with him. The film was a critical and box office success, recommended by the Los Angeles Times as "an adult, provocative piece of work". Some critics were skeptical of her performance: Billson again judged her as miscast, and Dan Jolin of Empire criticized her English accent.

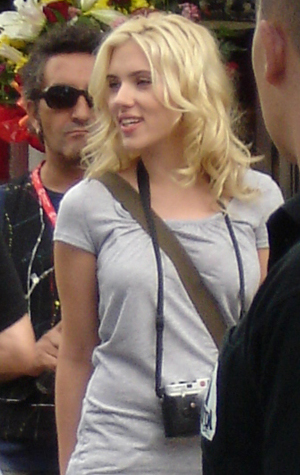
Johansson on the set of Vicky Cristina Barcelona in 2007

Johansson's sole release of 2007 was the critically panned comedy-drama The Nanny Diaries alongside Chris Evans and Laura Linney, in which she played a college graduate working as a nanny. Reviews of her performance were mixed; Variety wrote, "[She] essays an engaging heroine", and The New Yorker criticized her for looking "merely confused" while "trying to give the material a plausible emotional center". In 2008, Johansson starred, with Natalie Portman and Eric Bana, in The Other Boleyn Girl, which also earned mixed reviews. Promoting the film, Johansson and Portman appeared on the cover of W, discussing the public's reception of them with the magazine. In Rolling Stone, Pete Travers criticized the film for "[moving] in frustrating herks and jerks", but thought the duo were the only positive aspect of the production. Variety credited the cast as "almost flawless ... at the top of its game", citing "Johansson's quieter Mary... as the [film's] emotional center".

In her third collaboration with Allen, the romantic comedy-drama Vicky Cristina Barcelona (2008), which was filmed in Spain, Johansson plays one of the love interests of Javier Bardem's character alongside Penélope Cruz. The film was one of Allen's most profitable and received favorable reviews. A reviewer in Variety described Johansson as "open and malleable" compared to the other actors. She also played the femme fatale Silken Floss in The Spirit (2008), based on the newspaper comic strip of the same name by Will Eisner. It received poor reviews from critics, who deemed it melodramatic, unoriginal, and sexist. Johansson's only role in 2009 was as Anna Marks, a yoga instructor, in the ensemble comedy-drama He's Just Not That into You (2009). The film was released to tepid reviews but was a box office success.

=== 2010–2013: Marvel Cinematic Universe and worldwide recognition ===
Aspiring to appear on Broadway since childhood, Johansson made her debut in a 2010 revival of Arthur Miller's drama A View from the Bridge. Set in the 1950s in an Italian American neighborhood in New York, it tells the tragic tale of Eddie (Liev Schreiber), who has an inappropriate love for his wife's orphaned niece, Catherine (Johansson). After initial reservations about playing a teenage character, Johansson was convinced by a friend to take on the part. Ben Brantley of The New York Times wrote Johansson "melts into her character so thoroughly that her nimbus of celebrity disappears". Variety's David Rooney was impressed with the play and Johansson in particular, describing her as the chief performer. She won the 2010 Tony Award for Best Performance by a Featured Actress in a Play. Some critics and Broadway actors criticized the award committee's decision to reward the work of major Hollywood stars, including Johansson. In response, she said she understood the frustration but had worked hard for her accomplishments.

Johansson secured the part of Black Widow in Jon Favreau's Iron Man 2 (2010), a part of the Marvel Cinematic Universe (MCU), after Emily Blunt was forced to opt out due to other obligations. Before she was cast, she dyed her hair red to convince Favreau she was right for the part, and undertook stunt and strength training to prepare for the role. Johansson said the character resonated with her, and she admired the superhero's human traits. The film earned $623.9 million against its $200 million budget, and received generally positive reviews from critics, although reviewers criticized how her character was written. Tim Robey of The Daily Telegraph and Matt Goldberg thought she had little to do but look attractive. In 2011, Johansson played the role of Kelly, a zookeeper in the family film We Bought a Zoo alongside Matt Damon. The film got mainly favorable reviews, and Anne Billson praised Johansson for bringing depth to a rather uninteresting character. Johansson earned a Teen Choice Award for Choice Movie Actress: Drama nomination for her performance.

Johansson learned some Russian from a former teacher on the phone for her role as Black Widow in The Avengers (2012), another entry from the MCU. The film received mainly positive reviews and broke many box office records, becoming the third highest-grossing film both in the United States and worldwide. For her performance, she was nominated for two Teen Choice Awards and three People's Choice Awards. (Note: Johansson was nominated for Teen Choice Awards for Choice Movie Actress: Sci-Fi/Fantasy and Choice Summer Movie Star: Female, and People's Choice Awards for Favorite Movie Actress, Favorite On-Screen Chemistry (shared with Jeremy Renner) and Favorite Face of Heroism.) Later that year, Johansson portrayed actress Janet Leigh in Sacha Gervasi's Hitchcock, a behind-the-scenes drama about the making of Alfred Hitchcock's 1960 film Psycho. Roger Ebert wrote that while Johansson did not look much like Leigh, she did convey her spunk, intelligence, and sense of humor.

In January 2013, Johansson starred in a Broadway revival of Cat on a Hot Tin Roof, directed by Rob Ashford. Set in the Mississippi Delta, it examines the relationships within the family of Big Daddy (Ciarán Hinds), primarily between his son Brick (Benjamin Walker) and Maggie (Johansson). Her performance received mixed reviews. Entertainment Weekly's Thom Geier wrote Johansson "brings a fierce fighting spirit" to her part, but Joe Dziemianowicz from Daily News called her performance "alarmingly one-note". The 2013 Sundance Film Festival hosted the premiere of Joseph Gordon-Levitt's directorial debut, Don Jon. In this romantic comedy-drama, she played the girlfriend of the pornography-addicted title character. Gordon-Levitt wrote the role for Johansson, who had previously admired his acting work. The film received positive reviews, and Johansson's performance was highlighted by critics. Claudia Puig of USA Today considered it to be one of her best performances.

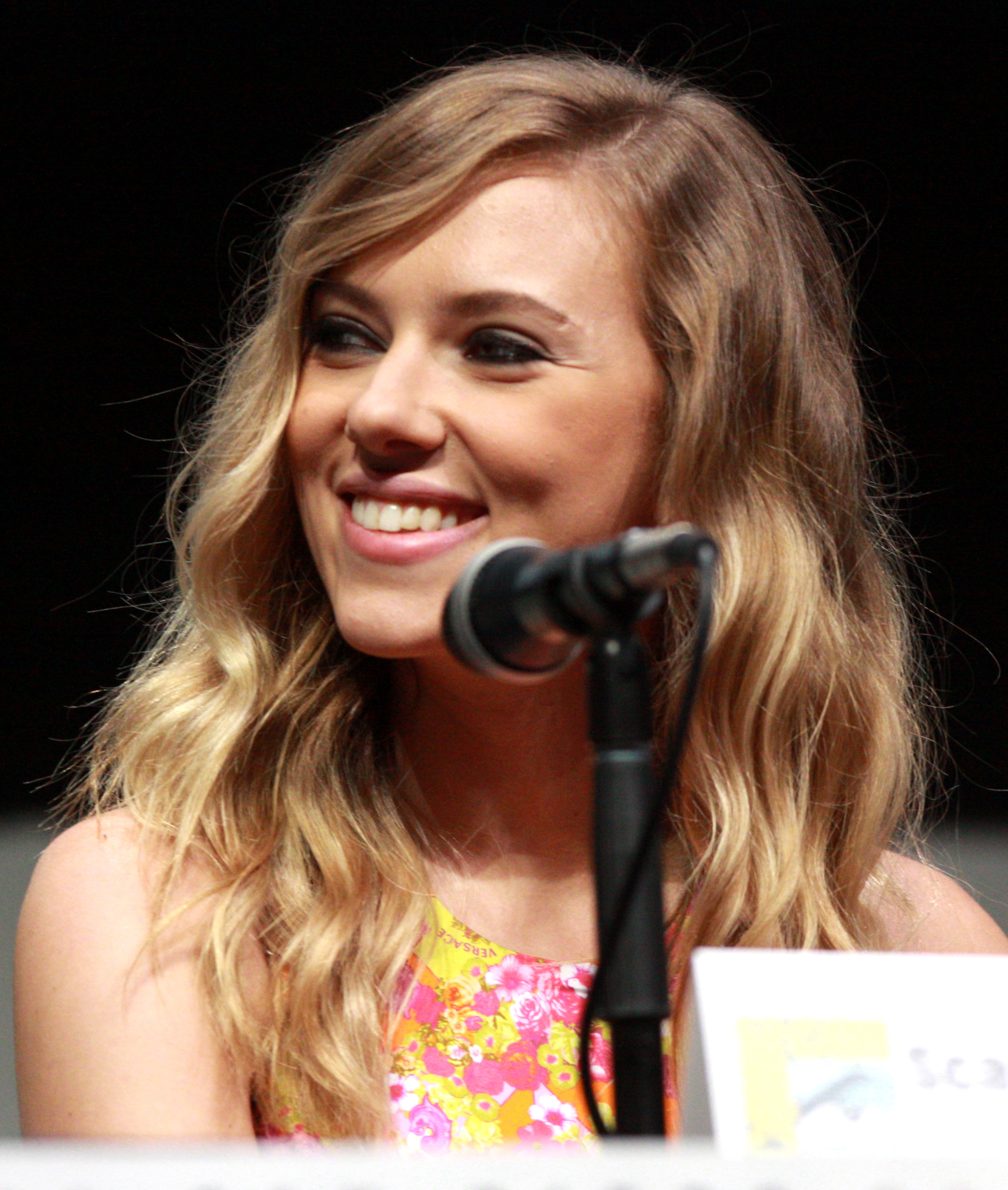
Johansson at the 2013 San Diego Comic-Con

In 2013, Johansson voiced the character Samantha, a self-aware computer operating system, in Spike Jonze's film Her, replacing Samantha Morton in the role. The film premiered at the 8th Rome International Film Festival, where Johansson won Best Actress; she was also nominated for the Critics' Choice Movie Award for Best Supporting Actress. Johansson was intimidated by the role's complexity, and found her recording sessions for the role challenging but liberating. Peter Travers believed Johansson's voice in the film was "sweet, sexy, caring, manipulative, scary [and] award-worthy". Time's Richard Corliss called her performance "seductive and winning", and Her was rated as one of the best films of 2013. She also won the Saturn Award for Best Supporting Actress at the 40th Saturn Awards in 2014 for her performance.

Johansson was cast in Jonathan Glazer's science fiction film Under the Skin (2013) as an extraterrestrial creature disguised as a human femme fatale who preys on men in Scotland. The project, an adaptation of Michel Faber's novel of the same name, took nine years to complete. For the role, she learned to drive a van and speak in an English accent. Johansson improvised conversations with non-professional actors on the street, who did not know they were being filmed. It was released to generally positive reviews, with particular praise for Johansson. Erin Whitney, writing for The Huffington Post, considered it to be her finest performance to that point, and noted that it was her first fully nude role. Author Maureen Foster wrote, "How much depth, breadth, and range Johansson mines from her character's very limited allowance of emotional response is a testament to her acting prowess that is, as the film goes on, increasingly stunning." It earned Johansson a BIFA for Best Performance by an Actress in a British Independent Film nomination.

=== 2014–2020: Blockbuster films and critical acclaim ===
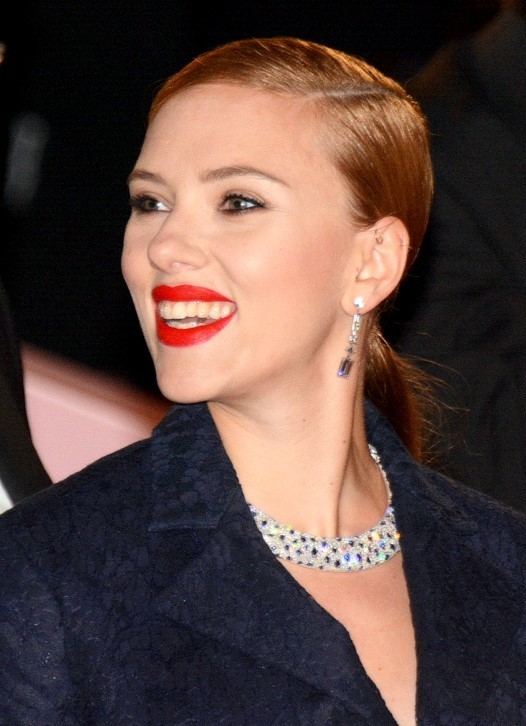
Johansson at the 2014 César Awards

Continuing her work in the MCU, Johansson reprised her role as Black Widow in Captain America: The Winter Soldier (2014). In the film, she joins forces with Captain America (Chris Evans) and Falcon (Anthony Mackie) to uncover a conspiracy within S.H.I.E.L.D., while facing a mysterious assassin known as the Winter Soldier. Johansson and Evans wrote their own dialogue for several scenes they had together. Johansson was attracted to her character's way of doing her job, employing her feminine wiles and not her physical appeal. The film was a critical and commercial success, grossing over $714 million worldwide. Critic Odie Henderson saw a "genuine emotional shorthand at work, especially from Johansson, who is excellent here". The role earned her a Saturn Award nomination for Best Supporting Actress.

Johansson played a supporting role in the film Chef (2014), alongside Robert Downey Jr., Sofía Vergara, and director Jon Favreau. It grossed over $ 45 million at the box office and was well received by critics. The Chicago Sun-Times writer Richard Roeper found the film "funny, quirky and insightful, with a bounty of interesting supporting characters". In Luc Besson's science fiction action film Lucy (2014), Johansson starred as the title character, who gains psychokinetic abilities when a nootropic drug is absorbed into her bloodstream. Besson discussed the role with several actresses, and cast Johansson based on her strong reaction to the script and her discipline. Critics generally praised the film's themes, visuals, and Johansson's performance; some found the plot nonsensical. IGN's Jim Vejvoda attributed the film's success to her acting and Besson's style. The film grossed $458 million on a budget of $40 million to become the 18th highest-grossing film of 2014.

In 2015 and 2016, Johansson again played Black Widow in the MCU films Avengers: Age of Ultron and Captain America: Civil War. During filming of the former, a mixture of close-ups, concealing costumes, stunt doubles, and visual effects were used to hide her pregnancy. Both films earned more than $1.1 billion, ranking among the highest-grossing films of all time. For Civil War, Johansson earned her second nomination for Critics' Choice Movie Award for Best Actress in an Action Movie and her fourth for Saturn Award for Best Supporting Actress. Earlier in 2016, Johansson featured in the Coen brothers' well-received comedy film Hail, Caesar! about a "fixer" working in the classical Hollywood cinema, trying to discover what happened to a cast member who vanished during the filming of a biblical epic; Johansson plays an actress who becomes pregnant while her film is in production. She also voiced Kaa in Jon Favreau's The Jungle Book, a live-action adaptation of Disney's 1967 animated film, and voiced Ash in the animated jukebox musical comedy film Sing (both released in 2016). That year, she also narrated an audiobook of Lewis Carroll's children's novel Alice's Adventures in Wonderland.

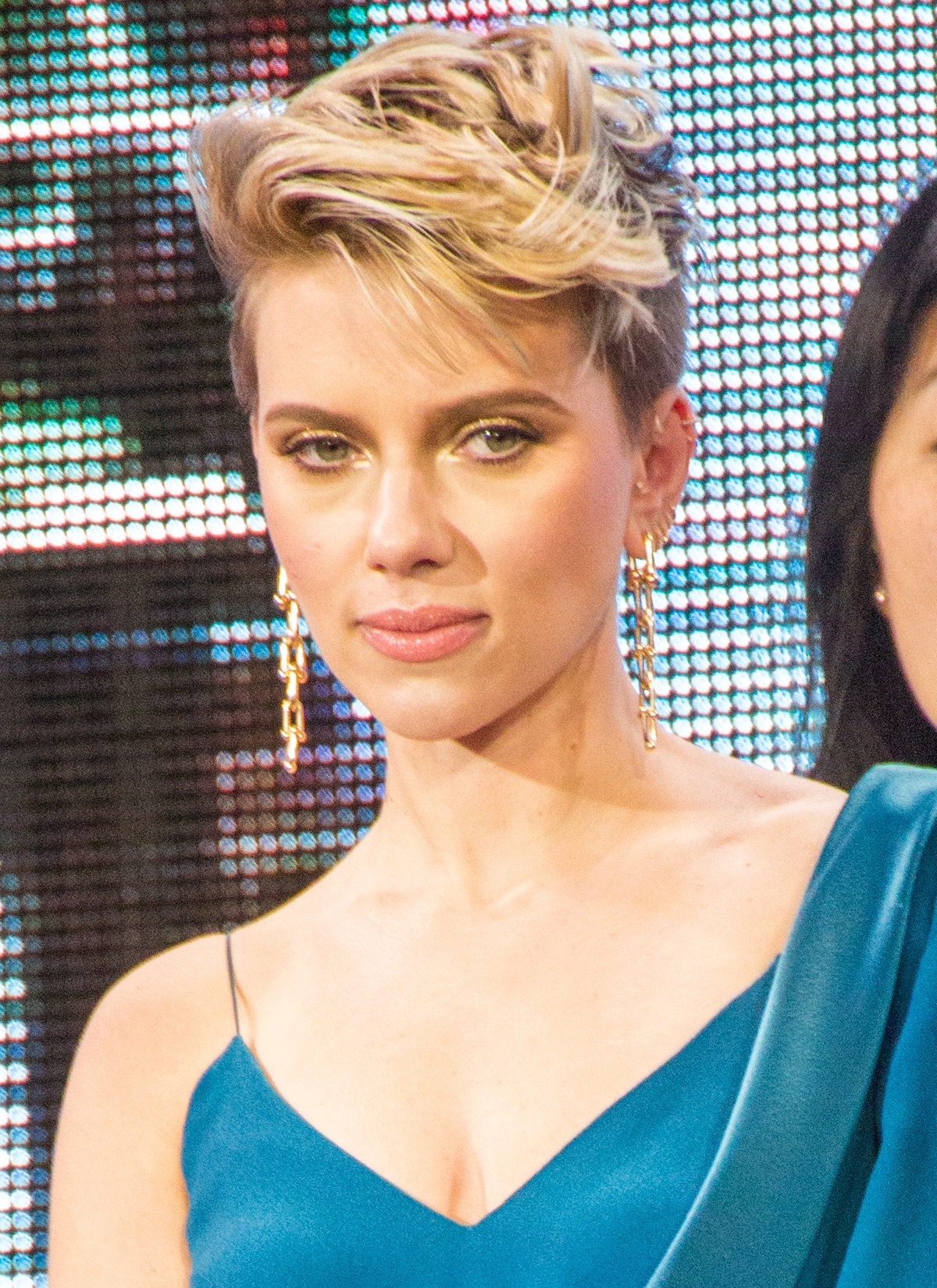
Johansson at the premiere of Ghost in the Shell in 2017

Johansson played Motoko Kusanagi in Rupert Sanders's 2017 film adaptation of the Ghost in the Shell franchise. The film was praised for its visual style, acting, and cinematography, but was the subject of controversy for whitewashing the cast, particularly Johansson's character, a cyborg meant to embody the memories of a Japanese woman. Johansson responded that she would never play a non-white character, but wanted to take the rare opportunity to star in a female-led franchise. Ghost in the Shell grossed $169.8 million worldwide on a production budget of $110 million.

In March 2017, Johansson hosted Saturday Night Live for the fifth time, making her the seventeenth person and the fourth woman (Note: After Candice Bergen, Drew Barrymore, and former cast member Tina Fey.) to enter its Five-Timers Club. Johansson's next 2017 film was the comedy Rough Night, in which she played Jess Thayer, one of the five friends—alongside Kate McKinnon, Jillian Bell, Ilana Glazer, and Zoë Kravitz—whose bachelorette party goes wrong after a male stripper dies. The film had a mixed critical reception and moderate box office returns. In 2018, Johansson voiced show dog Nutmeg in Wes Anderson's stop-motion animated film Isle of Dogs, released in March, and reprised her MCU role as Black Widow in Avengers: Infinity War, which followed the next month. Johansson was due to star in Rub & Tug, a biographical film in which she would have played Dante "Tex" Gill, a transgender man who operated a massage parlor and prostitution ring in the 1970s and 1980s. She dropped out of the project following backlash to the casting of a cisgender woman to play a transgender man.

In 2019, Johansson reprised her role as Black Widow in Avengers: Endgame, the second-highest-grossing film of all time. She then starred in Noah Baumbach's Netflix film Marriage Story, in which she and Adam Driver played a warring couple who file for divorce. Johansson found a connection with her character because she was in the midst of her own divorce proceedings at the time. Peter Bradshaw of The Guardian commended her "brilliantly textured" performance. She also took on the supporting role of a young boy's mother who shelters a Jewish girl in Nazi Germany in Taika Waititi's satire Jojo Rabbit. Waititi modeled the character on his own mother and cast Johansson to provide her a rare opportunity to perform comedy. The film received polarized reviews, but Stephanie Zacharek labeled her the "lustrous soul of the movie". Johansson received her first two Academy Award nominations, for Best Actress and Best Supporting Actress for her performances in Marriage Story and Jojo Rabbit, respectively, becoming the twelfth performer to be nominated for two Oscars in the same year. She also received two BAFTA nominations for these films and a Golden Globe nomination for the former.

=== 2021–present: Black Widow lawsuit and professional expansion ===
In 2021, after a one-year screen absence, Johansson reprised her role as Black Widow in her own solo prequel film, on which she also served as an executive producer. Also starring Florence Pugh, the film is set after Captain America: Civil War, with Johansson's character on the run, confronting her past. Johansson felt her role was complete, viewing it as a chance to showcase her character's independence and vulnerability, which she thought set her apart from other Avengers. Critics were generally favorable in reviews of the film, mainly praising Johansson and Pugh's performances. The Hollywood Reporter's David Rooney thought the film was a "stellar vehicle" for Johansson, and Pete Hammond of Deadline Hollywood found her "again a great presence in the role, showing expert action and acting chops throughout". For the film, Johansson won The Female Movie Star of 2021 at the 47th People's Choice Awards. Also that year, she reprised her voice role as Ash in the sequel Sing 2.

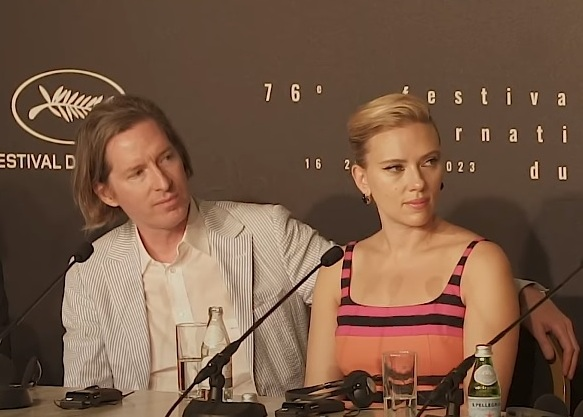
Johansson and Wes Anderson at the premiere of Asteroid City in 2023

In July 2021, Johansson sued Disney, claiming the simultaneous release of Black Widow on their streaming service Disney+ breached a contract clause requiring an exclusive theatrical release, thereby denying her additional box-office bonuses. In response, Disney said her lawsuit showed an indifference to the "horrific and prolonged" effects of the COVID-19 pandemic. The company also stated that Johansson had already received $20 million for the film and that the Disney+ Premier Access (Note: Created during the COVID-19 pandemic with theaters closed, it was a premium add-on that let Disney+ subscribers watch new content locked behind a paywall.) release would earn her additional compensation. The Hollywood Reporter called Disney's response "aggressive", and Creative Artists Agency co-chairman Bryan Lourd criticized Disney for attacking Johansson's character and disclosing her salary. In September, the dispute was resolved with undisclosed terms, though Variety later reported Johansson received over $40 million and would continue working with Disney.

Johansson returned to the screen with Wes Anderson's comedy Asteroid City (2023), in which she led an ensemble cast. It was her second film to premiere at the Cannes Film Festival after Match Point (2005). For her two months of work on the film, she took a substantial pay cut, earning $4,131 a week. Describing her collaboration with Anderson, she said, "I like the sort of constraints of Wes' precision. I think in some ways, it's more liberating." Anthony Lane of The New Yorker praised Johansson's ability to add depth to her character and for skillfully portraying both reality and imagination with wit. In Kristin Scott Thomas's directorial debut My Mother's Wedding, Johansson played one of three sisters reuniting for their mother's wedding. The Guardian's Benjamin Lee was displeased by the film and Johansson's "awkward British accent".

Founding the production company These Pictures, Johansson produced and starred in Fly Me to the Moon (2024), a romantic comedy set against the backdrop of the Space Race, opposite Channing Tatum. Critics considered the screwball chemistry between Johansson and Tatum to be film's highlight. She voiced Elita-1 in Transformers One, an animated prequel to the Transformers film series. Both films had poor box-office returns. Keen to join the Jurassic Park franchise for a decade, she starred in the installment Jurassic World Rebirth, which was released on July 2, 2025, to mixed to positive reviews and box office success. In addition, she reunited with Anderson in the ensemble adventure film The Phoenician Scheme, released on May 30, 2025. She made her directorial debut with the drama Eleanor the Great, starring June Squibb in the title role. Eleanor premiered at the 2025 Cannes Film Festival and released on September 26, 2025. By December 2025, she joined the cast for Mike Flanagan's The Exorcist: Martyrs (2027) and Matt Reeves' The Batman: Part II (2028), after dropping out of talks for Disney's live-action remake of Tangled (2010).

== Music career ==
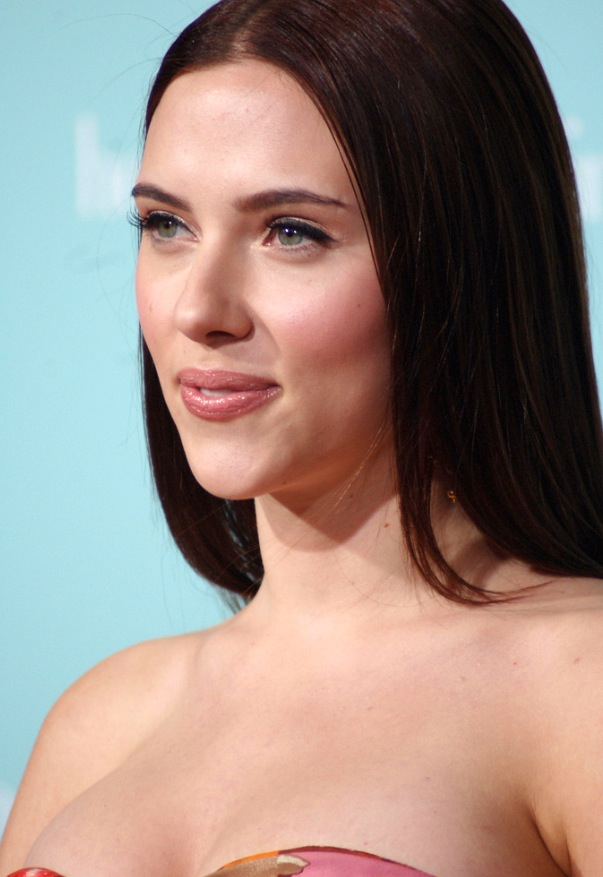
Johansson at the premiere of He's Just Not That into You in 2009

In 2006, Johansson sang the track "Summertime" for Unexpected Dreams – Songs from the Stars, a non-profit collection of songs recorded by Hollywood actors. She performed with the Jesus and Mary Chain for a Coachella reunion show in Indio, California, in April 2007. The following year, Johansson appeared as the leading lady in Justin Timberlake's music video, for "What Goes Around... Comes Around", which was nominated for an MTV Video Music Award for Video of the Year.

In May 2008, Johansson released her debut album Anywhere I Lay My Head, which consists of one original song and 10 cover versions of Tom Waits songs, and features David Bowie and members from the Yeah Yeah Yeahs and Celebration. Reviews of the album were mixed. Spin was not particularly impressed with Johansson's singing. Some critics found it to be "surprisingly alluring", "a bravely eccentric selection", and "a brilliant album" with "ghostly magic". NME named the album the "23rd best album of 2008", and it peaked at number 126 on the Billboard 200. Johansson started listening to Waits when she was 11 or 12 years old, and said of him, "His melodies are so beautiful, his voice is so distinct and I had my own way of doing Tom Waits songs."

In September 2009, Johansson and singer-songwriter Pete Yorn released a collaborative album, Break Up, inspired by Serge Gainsbourg's duets with Brigitte Bardot. The album reached number 41 in the U.S. In 2010, Steel Train released Terrible Thrills Vol. 1, which includes their favorite female artists singing songs from their self-titled album. Johansson is the first artist on the album, singing "Bullet". Johansson sang "One Whole Hour" for the 2011 soundtrack of the documentary film Wretches & Jabberers (2010). In 2012, she sang on a J. Ralph track entitled "Before My Time" for the end credits of the climate documentary Chasing Ice (2012), which received a nomination for an Academy Award for Best Original Song.

In February 2015, Johansson formed a band called the Singles with Este Haim from HAIM, Holly Miranda, Kendra Morris, and Julia Haltigan. The group's first single was called "Candy". Johansson was issued a cease and desist order from the lead singer of the Los Angeles-based rock band the Singles, demanding she stop using their name. In 2016, she performed "Trust in Me" for The Jungle Book soundtrack as well as "Set It All Free" and "I Don't Wanna" for Sing: Original Motion Picture Soundtrack. In 2018, Johansson collaborated with Pete Yorn again for an EP titled Apart, released June 1.

== Public image ==
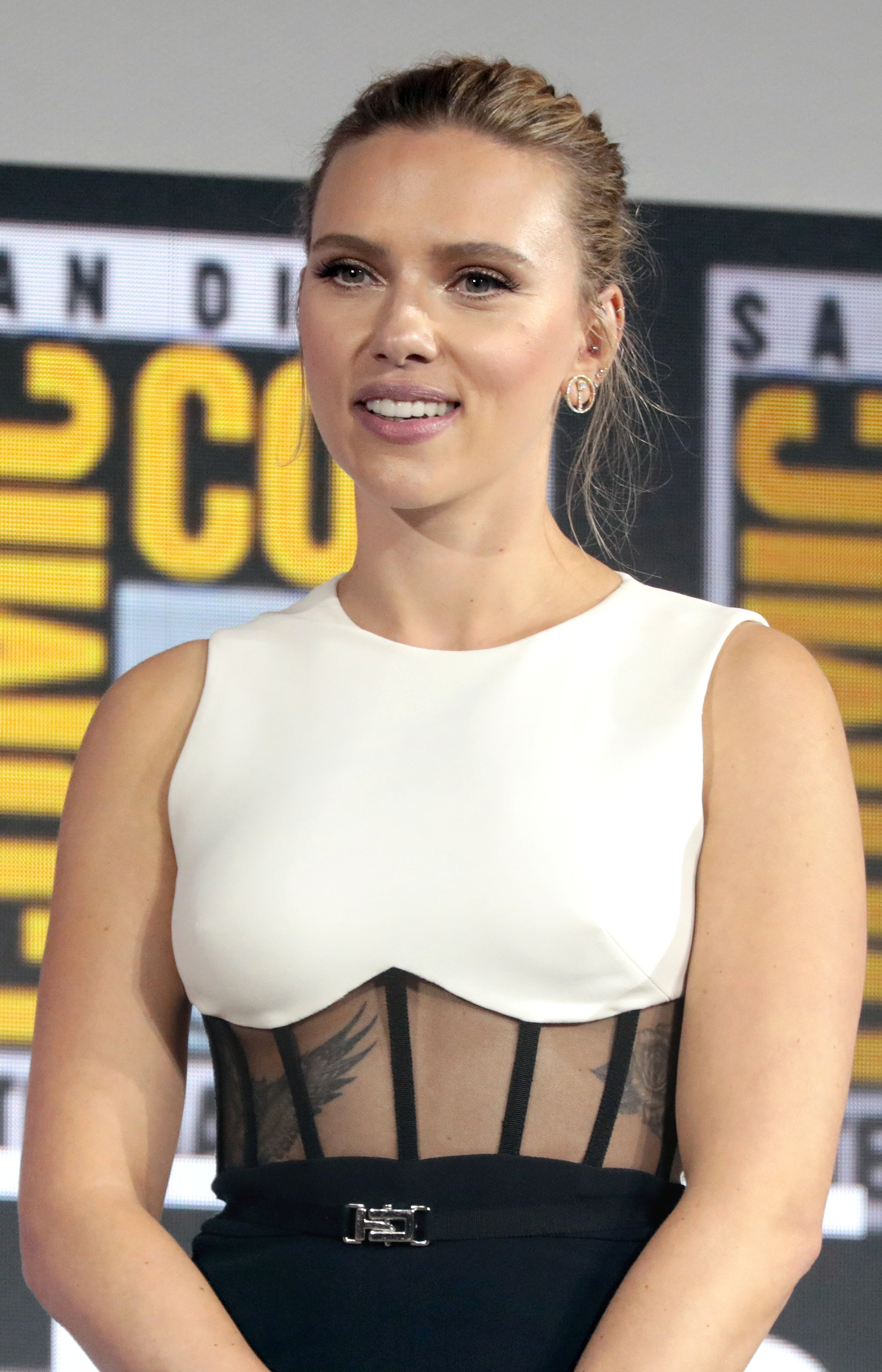
Johansson at the 2019 San Diego Comic Con

Johansson is described as a sex symbol by the media. As early as age 17, when filming Lost in Translation, she felt she was groomed as a "bombshell-type" actor, as she explained in a 2022 podcast with Bruce Bozzi. The Sydney Morning Herald describes her as "the embodiment of male fantasy". During the filming of Match Point, director Woody Allen remarked upon her attractiveness, calling her "beautiful" and "sexually overwhelming". In 2014, The New Yorker film critic Anthony Lane wrote that "she is evidently, and profitably, aware of her sultriness, and of how much, down to the last inch, it contributes to the contours of her reputation." Johansson has expressed displeasure at being sexualized and argued that a preoccupation with one's attractiveness does not last. She has stated that while she is flattered to be considered sexy, she finds the implication that her strength comes from her sexuality to be confining. She lost the role of Lisbeth Salander in The Girl with the Dragon Tattoo (2011) because the film's director, David Fincher, found her "too sexy" for the part. In 2016, as a comment on the delays of producing a standalone Black Widow film, Johansson cautioned that she may not want to wear a "skin-tight catsuit" for much longer.

Some media and fans call Johansson "ScarJo", which she finds lazy, flippant, and insulting. She has no social media profiles and does not wish to "continuously share details of my everyday life". Johansson ranks highly in various beauty listings. Maxim included her in their Hot 100 list from 2006 to 2014. She has been named "Sexiest Woman Alive" twice by Esquire (2006 and 2013) and has been included in similar listings by Playboy (2007), Men's Health (2011), and FHM (since 2005). She was named GQ's Babe of the Year in 2010. In 2022, Johansson founded the plant-based skincare line, The Outset, with Kate Foster.

Johansson was invited to join the Academy of Motion Picture Arts and Sciences in June 2004. In 2006, she appeared on Forbes' Celebrity 100 list and again in 2014, 2015, 2018, and 2019. She received a star on the Hollywood Walk of Fame in May 2012. In 2021 and 2025, she appeared on the Time 100, Time's annual list of the 100 most influential people in the world. Johansson was included on Forbes' annual list of the world's highest-paid actresses from 2014 to 2016, with respective earnings of $17 million, $35.5 million, and $25 million. She would later top the list in 2018 and 2019, with earnings of $40.5 million and $56 million, respectively. She was the highest-grossing actor of 2016, with a total of $1.2 billion. IndieWire credited her for taking on risky roles, such as in Her and Under the Skin, instead of simply appearing in blockbuster after blockbuster. As of January 2026, her films have grossed over $5.6 billion in North America and over $15.4 billion worldwide, making Johansson the highest-grossing box-office leading actor of all time domestically and the second highest-grossing actor worldwide, behind Zoe Saldaña. Madame Tussauds New York museum unveiled a wax statue of her in 2015.

Johansson has appeared in advertising campaigns for Calvin Klein, Dolce & Gabbana, L'Oréal, and Louis Vuitton and has represented the Spanish brand Mango since 2009. She was the first Hollywood celebrity to represent a champagne producer, appearing in advertisements for Moët & Chandon. In January 2014, the Israeli company SodaStream, which makes home-carbonation products, hired Johansson as its first global brand ambassador, a relationship that commenced with a television commercial during Super Bowl XLVIII on February 2, 2014. This created some controversy, as SodaStream at that time operated a plant in Israeli-occupied territory in the West Bank. In May 2024, Johansson criticized OpenAI for releasing a chatbot with a voice that resembled her own, after she declined to formally work with the company to provide her voice for the app.

== Personal life ==
=== Relationships and marriages ===
Johansson and Colin Jost at the 2026 New York Film Festival

While attending the Professional Children's School, Johansson dated classmate Jack Antonoff from 2001 to 2002. She then dated her Black Dahlia co-star Josh Hartnett for about two years until the end of 2006. According to Hartnett, they broke up because their busy schedules kept them apart. Johansson began dating Canadian actor Ryan Reynolds in April 2007. They became engaged in May 2008 and married in September 2008 during a wilderness retreat on Vancouver Island. They separated in December 2010 and divorced in July 2011. In a 2019 interview with Vanity Fair, Johansson reflected on the marriage. "I mean, the first time I got married I was 23 years old. I didn't really have an understanding of marriage. Maybe I kind of romanticized it, I think, in a way."

In November 2012, Johansson began dating French journalist Romain Dauriac, the owner of an advertising agency. They became engaged the following September. The pair divided their time between New York City and Paris. She gave birth to their daughter, Rose, in 2014. Johansson and Dauriac married that October in Philipsburg, Montana. They separated in mid-2016. In March 2017, Johansson filed for divorce, saying their marriage was "irretrievably broken", despite Dauriac urging her to withdraw the action. She never did, and the divorce was finalized in September 2017.

Johansson began dating Saturday Night Live co-head writer and Weekend Update co-host Colin Jost in May 2017. In May 2019, the two were engaged. They married in October 2020 at their New York home. She gave birth to their son in August 2021. Johansson resides in New York and Los Angeles.

=== In the media ===
In September 2011, nude photographs of Johansson were hacked from her cell phone and leaked online. She said the pictures had been sent to her husband, Ryan Reynolds, three years prior to the incident. In 2014, Johansson won a lawsuit against French publisher JC Lattès over libelous statements about her relationships in the novel The First Thing We Look At by Grégoire Delacourt. She was awarded $3,400 but had sued for $68,000.

Johansson has criticized the media for promoting an image that causes unhealthy diets and eating disorders among women. In an essay she wrote for The Huffington Post, she encouraged people to maintain a healthy body. She posed nude for the March 2006 cover of Vanity Fair alongside actress Keira Knightley and fully clothed fashion designer Tom Ford. The photograph sparked controversy as some believed it demonstrated that women are forced to flaunt their sexuality more often than men.

=== Philanthropy ===
Johansson has supported various charitable organizations, including Aid Still Required, Cancer Research UK, Stand Up To Cancer, Too Many Women (which works against breast cancer), and USA Harvest, which provides food for people in need. In 2005, Johansson became a global ambassador for the aid and development agency Oxfam. In 2007, she took part in the anti-poverty campaign ONE, which was organized by U2's lead singer, Bono. In March 2008, a UK-based bidder paid £20,000 on an eBay auction to benefit Oxfam, winning a hair and makeup treatment, a pair of tickets, and a chauffeured trip to accompany her on a 20-minute date to the world premiere of He's Just Not That into You.

In January 2014, Johansson resigned from Oxfam after criticism of her promotion of SodaStream, whose main factory was based in Mishor Adumim, an Israeli settlement in the West Bank; Oxfam opposes all trade with such Israeli settlements. Oxfam stated that it was thankful for her contributions in raising funds to fight poverty. In an interview with The Observer published two months later, Johansson maintained that she had no regrets over her endorsement of SodaStream, stating that she "was aware of that particular factory before [she] signed" on. She argued that it was "very easily debatable" as to whether West Bank settlements were illegal. Johansson later told Vanity Fair that she believed that the backlash she had received for endorsing SodaStream was primarily motivated by antisemitism. Together with her Avengers costars, Johansson raised $500,000 for the victims of Hurricane Maria.

In 2018, she collaborated with 300 women in Hollywood to set up the Time's Up initiative to protect women from harassment and discrimination. Johansson took part in the Women's March in Los Angeles in January 2018, where she spoke on topics such as abuses of power, sharing her own experience. She received backlash for calling out actor James Franco on allegations of sexual misconduct, since in the past she had defended working with Woody Allen amid an accusation by his daughter, Dylan Farrow. Johansson's involvement also prompted the Palestinian American Women’s Association to boycott the march, citing what they regarded as the incompatibility of her support for Israel with the goals of the Women's March.

Johansson has supported Operation Warrior Wellness, a division of the David Lynch Foundation that helps veterans learn Transcendental Meditation. Her grand-uncle, Phillip Schlamberg, was the last American pilot to have been killed during WWII. He had gone on a bombing mission with Jerry Yellin, who went on to become co-founder of Operation Warrior Wellness.

=== Political views ===
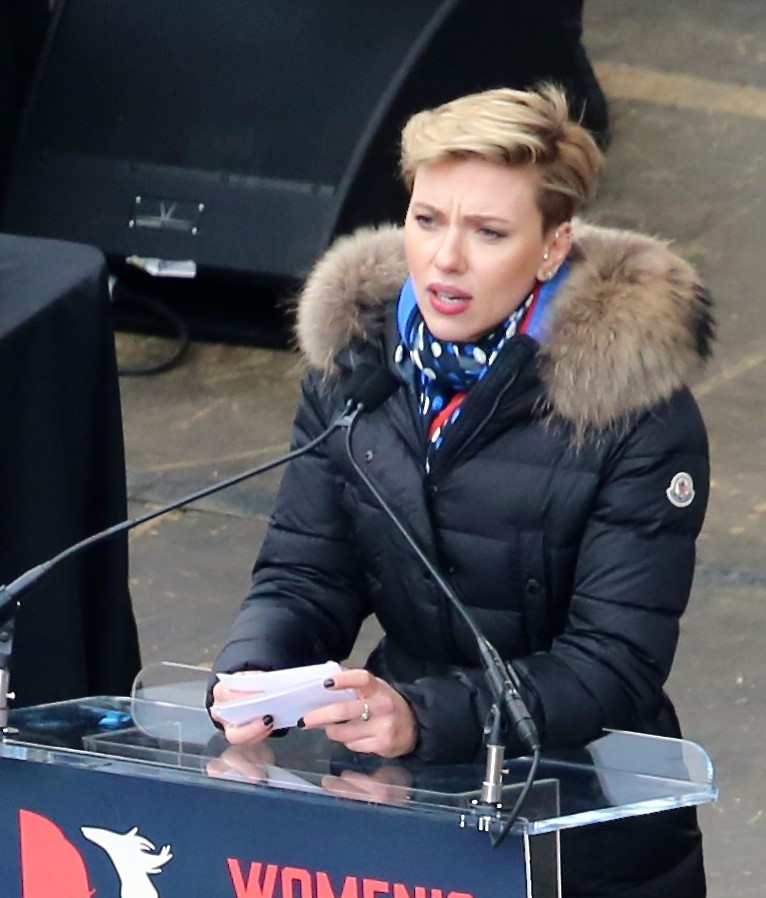
Johansson at the 2017 Women's March

Johansson was registered as an independent, at least through 2008, and campaigned for Democratic candidate John Kerry in the 2004 United States presidential election. When George W. Bush was re-elected in 2004, she said she was disappointed.

In January 2008, her campaign for Democratic candidate Barack Obama included appearances in Iowa targeted at younger voters, an appearance at Cornell College, and a speaking engagement at Carleton College in Northfield, Minnesota, on Super Tuesday, 2008. Johansson appeared in the music video for rapper will.i.am's song, "Yes We Can" (2008), directed by Jesse Dylan; the song was inspired by Obama's speech after the 2008 New Hampshire primary. In February 2012, Johansson and Anna Wintour hosted a fashion launch of clothing and accessories, whose proceeds went to the Obama's re-election campaign. She addressed voters at the Democratic National Convention in September 2012, calling for Obama's re-election and more engagement from young voters. She encouraged women to vote for Obama and condemned Mitt Romney for his opposition to Planned Parenthood.

Johansson publicly endorsed and supported Manhattan Borough President Scott Stringer's 2013 run for New York City Comptroller by hosting a series of fundraisers. To encourage people to vote in the 2016 presidential election, in which Johansson endorsed Hillary Clinton, she appeared in a commercial alongside her MCU co-star Robert Downey Jr., and Joss Whedon. In 2017, she spoke at the Women's March on Washington, addressing Donald Trump's presidency and stating that she would support the president if he works for women's rights and stops withdrawing federal funding for Planned Parenthood. During the 2020 Democratic presidential primaries, Johansson endorsed Elizabeth Warren, calling her "thoughtful and progressive but realistic". In December 2020, three members of the Egyptian Initiative for Personal Rights, an Egyptian civil rights organization, were released from prison in Egypt, after Johansson had described their detention circumstances and demanded the trio's release. Johansson joined a call with other actors in support of Kamala Harris during the 2024 presidential election.

== Acting credits and accolades ==
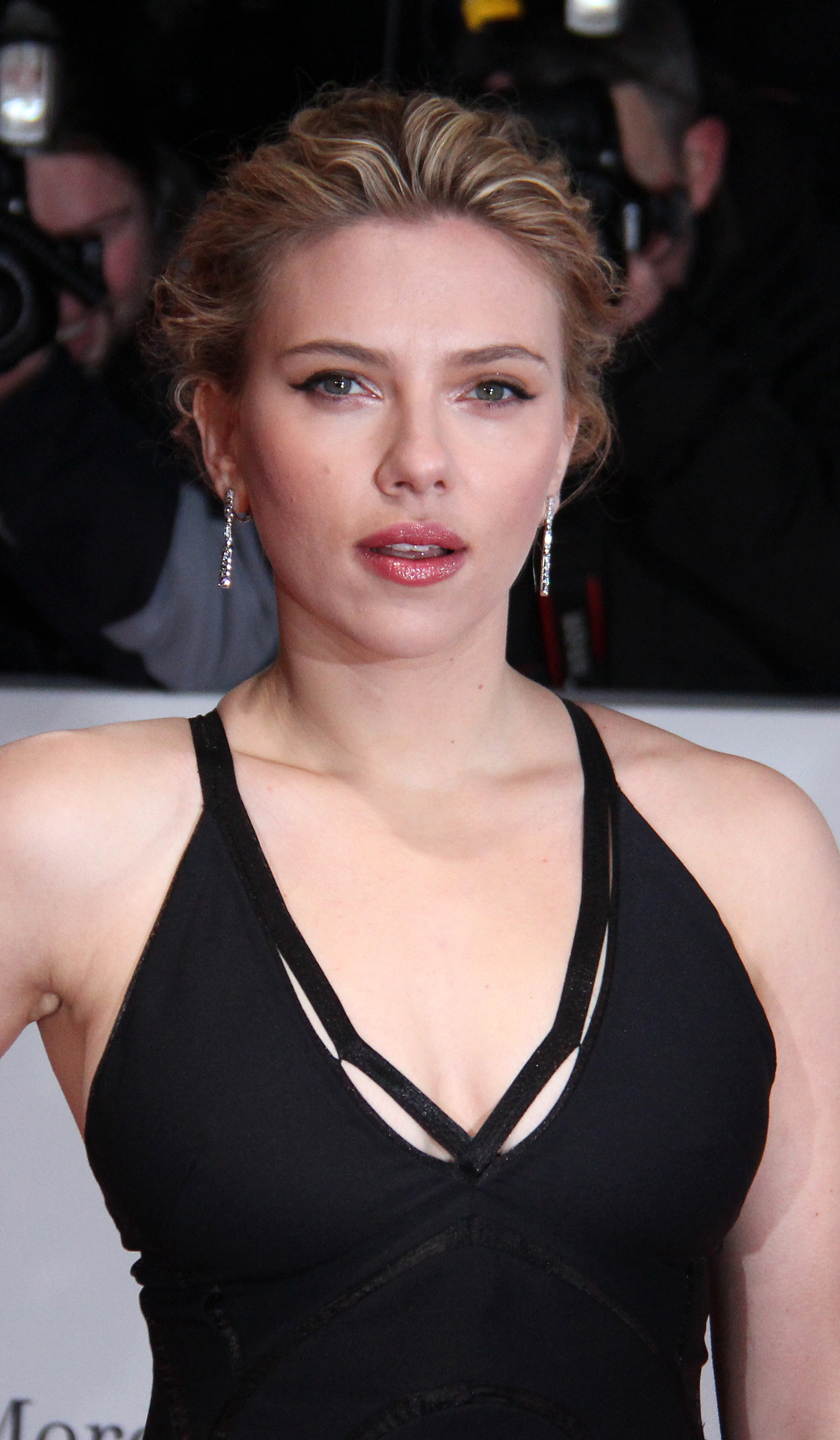
Johansson at the 2012 Goldene Kamera Awards

Johansson's films have grossed over $15.1 billion worldwide. Her top 10 highest-grossing films include Avengers: Endgame (2019), Avengers: Infinity War (2018), The Avengers (2012), Avengers: Age of Ultron (2015), Captain America: Civil War (2016), The Jungle Book (2016), Jurassic World Rebirth (2025), Captain America: The Winter Soldier (2014), Sing (2016), and Iron Man 2 (2010).

Over her career, Johansson has received various accolades, including a BAFTA Award and a Tony Award, as well as nominations for two Academy Awards, seven Critics' Choice Awards, five Golden Globe Awards, and three Actor Awards. Johansson has been recognized by the Academy of Motion Picture Arts and Sciences for the following:

- 92nd Academy Awards (2019): Best Actress, nomination, for Marriage Story
- 92nd Academy Awards (2019): Best Supporting Actress, nomination, for Jojo Rabbit

These recognitions make Johansson one of the dozen actors to have achieved two nominations at the Academy Awards in the same year. She is also one of the nine actors double-nominated in the same category in the same year at the British Academy Film Awards, with her two nominations in the Best Actress in a Leading Role category for her work in the 2003 films Lost in Translation and Girl with a Pearl Earring, winning for the former. Her two BAFTA nominations that year also made her the first of the group not to have either performance recognized by the Academy Awards, and she was also the first Best Actress winner since Maggie Smith in 1988 to not receive a nomination for the corresponding Oscar that year. (Note: Since Johansson, only Joanna Scanlan has achieved such feat, doing so for After Love at the 75th British Academy Film Awards in 2022.) Lost in Translation and Girl with a Pearl Earring also earned her simultaneous Best Actress nominations at the 61st Golden Globe Awards, (Note: The former was nominated in the musical or comedy category while the latter was nominated in the drama category.) and in the two subsequent years she received nominations for her work in A Love Song for Bobby Long (2004) and Match Point (2005).

== Discography ==
- Anywhere I Lay My Head (2008)
- Break Up (with Pete Yorn) (2009)

== See also ==
- List of actors nominated for two Academy Awards in the same year
- List of actors with Academy Award nominations
- List of actors with two or more Academy Award nominations in acting categories

== Bibliography ==
- Roberts, Chris (2007). Scarlett Johansson: Portrait of a Rising Star (Hardcover ed.). London: Carlton Books. ISBN 9781844423996. OCLC 440517789.
