= Kill Code =

- Release poster
- Directed by: Justin Price
- Written by: Justin Price
- Produced by: Justin Price; Latavius Powell; Jeff Bowler; Bret Saxon
- Starring: Harvey Keitel; Frank Grillo; Peter Stormare; Tyrese Gibson
- Cinematography: Filip Vandewal
- Edited by: Ethan Maniquis; Sara Neufeld
- Music by: Aldo Shllaku
- Production companies: Powell and Price Productions; Wonderfilm Media
- Distributed by: Quiver Distribution
- Release date: July 24, 2026
- Running time: 87 minutes
- Country: United States
- Language: English

Kill Code is a 2026 American cyberpunk action thriller film written and directed by Justin Price, and starring Harvey Keitel, Frank Grillo, Peter Stormare and Tyrese Gibson.

== Plot ==
A power-hungry corporation has taken over the conventional prison system and made criminals the new law enforcers.

== Cast ==
- Harvey Keitel as Eion
- Peter Stormare
- Franzi Schissler as Elera
- Frank Grillo as Benjamin
- Tyrese Gibson as Lukas
- Brian Kurlander as Robert
- Brett Cullen as Sawyer
- Nick Loren as Mason
- Jacob Artist as Kyron

== Production ==
In February 2022, Keitel, Stormare and Schissler joined the cast for the film. Later that same month, it was announced that Grillo joined the cast. In March 2022, it was announced that Gibson joined the cast.

Filming occurred in Biloxi, Mississippi in February 2022. Filming also occurred in Gulfport, Mississippi in March 2022.

== Release ==
In June 2026, the film was retitled to Kill Code, and was released on video on demand by Quiver Distribution on July 24, 2026.
