= Nick Loren =

American singer

- Nick Loren in Chicago 2009
- Born: December 14, 1970 (age 55); San Diego, California, U.S.
- Occupations: Actor; television personality
- Years active: 1996–present
- Spouse: Denise Loren (m. 2000)
- Children: 3
- Website: www.facebook.com/nicklorenpage

Nick Loren (born December 14, 1970) is an American actor, Emmy-nominated television host, singer-songwriter, producer, and professional stunt double. He has been the professional stunt double for John Travolta and an accredited actor in over 24 films, including From Paris with Love, Old Dogs, Wild Hogs, Hairspray, A Love Song for Bobby Long, Be Cool, Swordfish, and Face/Off. Loren has been featured on Entertainment Tonight, The Insider, The Hollywood Reporter, AdAge.com, O Magazine, Dateline NBC, Eye on LA, as well as many morning shows and magazines.

== Career ==
In February 1996 Loren met actor John Travolta while working as a stand-in on the set of Face/Off. Loren put his music on hold to work with Travolta. In 1997, Loren had a small role in the movie The General's Daughter. In late 2007 Loren decided to go back to music, launching his debut solo album titled Forever Be Cool in June 2008. The release party was hosted by television personality Mark Steines of Entertainment Tonight and attended by Travolta, Nikki Blonsky, Luis Guzmán, Chubby Checker, and director Tony Scott. His album reached number 6 on the Top 40 AC chart in January 2009.

While filming From Paris with Love in Paris, France, in December 2008, Loren suffered a severe broken ankle after a stunt went wrong and he fell three stories out of a window. This led Loren to evaluate his profession as a stuntman and he redirected his career towards hosting and producing film and television. One of Loren's first producing endeavors was Dog-On Television, a DVD for stay at home dogs. The DVD has been featured in O Magazine, on Dateline NBC's Pet Nation, Entertainment Tonight and The Insider. Along with producing, Loren has gone on to become a television personality for the magazine-style talk show First Coast Living. Nick was nominated for a Suncoast Emmy for his hosting on First Coast Living in 2011.

Loren has traveled the country teaching workshops to children and young adults on how to handle being in the entertainment business. Loren was a single dad to his five-year-old son before he married television and film line producer/UPM, Denise Loren September 9, 2000. Denise died from stage 4 breast cancer August 19, 2025. They have two children together.

== Filmography ==
Year	Title	Role	Notes
1999	General's Daughter	Colonel Nick	
2000	Bar Hopping	Composer	film Composer
2000	Lucky Numbers	Father	
2001	Swordfish	Dark Suit	
2001	Domestic Disturbance	Cop	
2003	Basic	Helicopter Pilot	
2004	The Punisher	Agent Moss	Uncredited
2004	LA Twister	New Owner	
2004	A Love Song for Bobby Long	Merchant	
2004	Dog-On Television	Executive Producer	(video) Executive Producer & Editor
2004	Ladder 49	Man at bar	
2005	Be Cool	Assistant Director	
2006	Lonely Hearts	Detective January	Actor & Stunt Double to John Travolta
2007	Wild Hogs	Chili Pepper	Actor & Stunt Double to John Travolta
2007	Hairspray	Cop Nick	
2008	Entertainment Tonight	Himself	Episode dated June 9, 2008
2009	The Taking of Pelham 123	Tunnel Commander	Actor & Stunt Double to John Travolta
2009	Old Dogs	Guido - Singing Waiter #2	
2010	From Paris With Love	Chief of Security	Actor & Stunt Double to John Travolta
2010-2014	First Coast Living	Himself - Host	Daily Magazine Style Show
2012	Rock of Ages	Warner Brothers Executive	Actor
2014	The Forger	Bouncer #1	
2015	Criminal Activities	Mechanic	
2018	Gotti	Shooter #1	
2019	The Fanatic	Man Kissing Moose's Mother	
2019	Hell on the Border	Captain George Reeves	
2026	Kill Code	Mason	Post-production

== Discography ==
=== Albums ===
- Forever Be Cool (2008)
