= Ejner Johansson =

Danish art historian and author (1922–2001)

- Born: Ejner Bainkamp Johansson; 7 March 1922; Copenhagen, Denmark
- Died: 28 September 2001 (aged 79)
- Occupations: Art historian; writer; film director
- Relatives: Scarlett Johansson (granddaughter)

Ejner Bainkamp Johansson (7 March 1922 – 28 September 2001) was a Danish art historian, writer, and film director. He was also a 1998 N. L. Høyen Medal recipient.

== Early life ==
Ejner Bainkamp Johansson was born in 1922 in Copenhagen. His father, Axel Johansson, had emigrated from Furuby in Kronoberg, Sweden, to Denmark and became a naturalised Danish citizen and married the Dane Margarethe Hansine Hansen. Ejner is a descendant of the Wiesel family from Virestad in Småland, one of the largest Swedish clergy families of the 17th, 18th and 19th century.

== Career ==
Having attained his magister of art degree in 1956 and art history in 1967, Johansson was employed as a television producer in Denmark's Radio with the arts as his specialty. Here he hosted a number of late night programs on art and culture.

Johansson also assisted the Hirschsprung Collection with several exhibits.

== Personal life ==
Johansson had a son named Karsten Johansson (b. 1943) and through him was the paternal grandfather of actresses Scarlett and Vanessa Johansson and Hunter, Adrian and Christian Johansson. According to Scarlett, she knows almost nothing about her grandfather. Even though she visited Denmark, she actually never met him due to his estrangement from her father.

== Works ==
Johansson wrote a large number of cultural and art historical books. Some of them are:

- Dansk marinemaleri i det nittende aarhundrede (1951)
- Richard Mortensen (1962) (translated into English and French)
- Omkring Frederiksholms Kanal (1964)
- Andersens ansigter (1992)
- De danske malere i München (1997)

== Awards ==
Johanson received LO's Culture Prize in 1984. He received the N. L. Høyen Medal in 1998.
