= From Paris with Love (film) =

2010 French film by Pierre Morel

- U.S. theatrical release poster
- Directed by: Pierre Morel
- Screenplay by: Adi Hasak
- Story by: Luc Besson
- Produced by: India Osborne
- Starring: John Travolta; Jonathan Rhys Meyers; Kasia Smutniak; Richard Durden
- Cinematography: Michel Abramowicz
- Edited by: Frédéric Thoraval
- Music by: David Buckley
- Production companies: EuropaCorp; M6; Eclair Films; Canal+
- Distributed by: EuropaCorp Distribution
- Release date: February 5, 2010 (United States)
- Running time: 92 minutes
- Country: France
- Languages: English; French
- Budget: $52 million
- Box office: $52.8 million

From Paris with Love is a 2010 French action-thriller film directed by Pierre Morel and starring John Travolta and Jonathan Rhys Meyers. The screenplay was co-written by Luc Besson. The film was released in the United States on February 5, 2010, by Lionsgate Films and both in the United Kingdom and Japan by Warner Bros. Pictures.

== Plot ==
James Reese appears to be an efficient and affable personal aide to the U.S. ambassador in France and after a brief morning chat, Reese quickly leaves, slips into the building's dark parking garage to switch license plates on his vehicle before successfully surveilling men speeding away. While Reese is a CIA operative with an Official Cover, he longs for more work in the field and phones his supervisor to ask for a promotion. His boss gives him another assignment – delivering a top secret chip to the ambassador's office. Reese discovers the chip was placed in his jacket pocket and hides it as his girlfriend knocks on the door. He is eventually partnered with NOC field agent Charlie Wax. Reese discovers that Wax was detained by French Customs because he refused to surrender cans of his favorite energy drink. Despite the apparent triviality of the situation, Wax continues to verbally abuse French Customs until Reese uses his diplomatic authority to allow Wax's luggage through customs.

Once in the car, Wax apologizes for his behavior and reveals that the cans actually held pieces of his personal sidearm. Wax then explains that he has been sent to Paris to investigate a Triad drug ring, indirectly responsible for the death of the niece of the Secretary of Defense. During the investigation, Wax raids a Triad-run restaurant and warehouse, where he reveals that his true objective is to trace money back to a group of Pakistani terrorists. Evidence leads them to the terrorist hideout in a rundown apartment, resulting in an armed confrontation wherein most of the terrorists are killed. There, Wax and Reese learn that the terrorists plan to infiltrate the U.S. embassy with explosives hidden beneath their burkas. As they collect evidence, they find photographs of Reese pinned to a wall.

Ultimately, Reese learns that the terrorists are targeting a summit meeting. During dinner at Reese's apartment, Wax realizes, due to her roommate inadvertently revealing the terrorist's codeword 'Rose' during a phone call, that Reese's fiancée Caroline is a sleeper agent who was assigned to infiltrate them. Wax shoots the roommate dead, and proves to Reese that the entire apartment was bugged, and that there was a locator transmitter in the ring she gave Reese. When confronted, Caroline shoots Reese in the shoulder and escapes through a window, before a car picks her up on the street below.

Caroline plans to detonate an explosive vest at the summit while the other remaining terrorist speeds towards a U.S. motorcade in an attempted suicide attack. However, Wax destroys the vehicle with a rocket launcher just in time. Reese then finds Caroline at the summit and attempts to dissuade her from carrying out her mission, but she tries to detonate her vest anyway. Ultimately, Reese is forced to kill her, telling her that he loves her one final time before pulling the trigger.

As Wax leaves Paris, Reese escorts him to his plane, where Wax offers a full-time partnership. Reese tells Wax that he needs to go back to his apartment to take care of some things, but Wax informs him that it's already been dealt with. Wax, knowing the real reason Reese wanted to go back to his apartment, gives him 3 miniature pictures of Reese and Caroline, saying that it's 'something to remember her by'. The two play a game of chess on the tarmac, placing their handguns on a utility cart, Reese revealing that he is now carrying a Desert Eagle pistol, and Wax welcomes him to the club as his partner.

== Cast ==
- John Travolta as Charlie Wax
- Jonathan Rhys Meyers as James Reese
- Kasia Smutniak as Caroline
- David Gasman as German Tourist/The Voice
- Richard Durden as Ambassador Bennington
- Yin Bing as M. Wong
- Amber Rose Revah as Nichole
- Eric Godon as Foreign Minister
- Francois Bredon as The Thug
- Chems Eddine Dahmani as Rashid
- Sami Darr as The Pimp
- Julien Hagnery as Chinese Punk
- Mostefa Stiti as Dir Yasin
- Rebecca Dayan as Foreign Minister's Aide
- Michael Vander-Meiren as Airport Security Official
- Didier Constant as Customs Official
- Alexandra Boyd as Head of the Delegation
- Stephen Shagov as Embassy Security
- Mike Powers as Embassy Security
- Nick Loren as Chief of Security
- Farid Elouardi as Bearded Driver
- Melissa Mars as Wax's Hooker
- Hang Yin (actress) as Asian Hooker 'German'
- Frédéric Chau as Chinese Maitre D
- Tam Solo as Suicidal Pakistani

== Reception ==
=== Critical response ===
The film received mixed reviews from critics. On the review aggregator Rotten Tomatoes, the film has an approval rating of 37% based on 158 reviews, with an average rating of 4.8/10. The site's critical consensus states, "Though not without its charms—chief among them John Travolta's endearingly over-the-top performance—From Paris with Love is too muddled and disjointed to satisfy." On Metacritic it has a score of 42% based on reviews from 32 critics, indicating "mixed or average reviews". Audiences polled by CinemaScore gave the film an average grade of "B" on an A+ to F scale.

Peter Travers of Rolling Stone gave it one star out of four, stating, "From Paris with Love has no vital signs at all, just crushing dull repetition that makes one noisy, violent scene play exactly like the last one." A couple of reviews from SBS and Newshub criticised the film for "ludicrous" plot developments and racism.

=== Box office ===
The film opened in the US on February 5, 2010, and took $8,158,860 on its opening weekend, ranked number 3 in the charts in 2,722 theaters. The movie was open in the US until March 11, 2010, a total of 5 weeks. Its final US domestic gross was $24,077,427. It also grossed $28,753,524 internationally for a worldwide total of $52,830,951- against its $52 million production budget. In July 2010, Parade listed the film as number 4 on its list of "Biggest Box Office Flops of 2010 (So Far)."

== Home media ==
The movie was released on DVD in the US on June 8, 2010, and sold 624,791 units for a gross of $11,085,323. It was the third-biggest selling DVD in its opening week, behind Alice in Wonderland and Shutter Island, with 293,011 units sold. The movie was released on DVD and Blu-ray in the UK on August 2, 2010.

== Potential sequel ==
In an interview with Celebrity Examiner, Luc Besson commented that he would love to see From Paris with Love turn into a franchise with sequels.

Travolta said in an interview with The Star Ledger: "We could do, From London with Love, From Prague with Love. This is one of the only movies that I would enjoy as a franchise. I'm not a big sequel person, but this one I would love."

As of December 2025, there has been no further information on the proposed sequel.
