= A Love Song for Bobby Long =

2004 film by Shainee Gabel

- Theatrical release poster
- Directed by: Shainee Gabel
- Screenplay by: Shainee Gabel
- Based on: Off Magazine Street by Ronald Everett Capps
- Produced by: Bob Yari; R. Paul Miller; David Lancaster
- Starring: John Travolta; Scarlett Johansson; Gabriel Macht; Deborah Kara Unger
- Cinematography: Elliot Davis
- Edited by: Lee Percy; Lisa Fruchtman
- Music by: Nathan Larson
- Production companies: El Camino Pictures; Destination Films; Crossroads Films; Bob Yari Productions
- Distributed by: Lions Gate Films
- Release dates: September 2, 2004 (Venice); December 29, 2004 (United States)
- Running time: 119 minutes
- Country: United States
- Language: English
- Box office: $1.8 million

A Love Song for Bobby Long is a 2004 American Southern Gothic psychological drama film written and directed by Shainee Gabel, who based her screenplay on the novel Off Magazine Street by Ronald Everett Capps. It stars John Travolta as the title character, an aging alcoholic, and Scarlett Johansson as a headstrong young woman who returns to New Orleans, Louisiana after her estranged mother's death.

The film had its world premiere at the 61st Venice International Film Festival on September 2, 2004. It began a limited release in the United States on December 29, 2004, followed by a wide release on January 21, 2005, by Lions Gate Films.

== Plot ==
When her neglectful mother Lorraine, a jazz singer, dies from a drug overdose, 18-year-old Purslane “Pursy” Hominy Will leaves a Florida trailer park and her abusive boyfriend behind to return to her hometown of New Orleans, where she had previously dropped out of high school.

She is surprised to find strangers living in her mother's dilapidated house: Bobby Long, a former professor of literature at Auburn University, and his protégé and former teaching assistant Lawson Pines, a struggling writer. Both are heavy drinkers and smokers, and pass the time quoting poets, playing chess, and hanging out with the neighbors; Long also sings country-folk songs. The two convince Pursy that her mother left the house to all three of them. The real truth is that Pursy is the sole heir, and her mother's will limits how long the other two can stay in the house.

Pursy moves in, becoming the most responsible member of an evolving dysfunctional family. The men's efforts to drive her away decline as they grow more fond of her. Bobby – slovenly and suffering from ailments he prefers to ignore – wants Pursy to improve herself. He introduces her to the novel The Heart Is a Lonely Hunter, and encourages her to go back to school and graduate. Lawson is attracted to her but hesitates to become involved. All three have memories of Lorraine, especially Pursy, who feels that her mother ignored her to pursue her singing career. When she finds a cache of letters her mother wrote to her but never mailed, Pursy learns more about how Lorraine felt about her, and the identity of her biological father.

== Cast ==
- John Travolta as Bobby Long
- Scarlett Johansson as Purslan "Pursy" Hominy Will
- Gabriel Macht as Lawson Pines
- Deborah Kara Unger as Georgianna
- Clayne Crawford as Lee
- Sonny Shroyer as Earl
- Carol Sutton as Ruthie
- Warren Kole as Sean (as Warren Blosjo)
- Nick Loren as Merchant

== Production ==
According to the film credits, it was shot on location in New Orleans and Gretna, Louisiana.

== Soundtrack ==
The soundtrack includes "Someday" by Los Lobos, "Bone" by Thalia Zedek, "Lonesome Blues" by Lonnie Pitchford, "Different Stars" and "Lie in the Sound" by Trespassers William, "All I Ask is Your Love" by Helen Humes, "Rising Son" by Big Bill Morganfield, "Praying Ground Blues" by Lightnin' Hopkins, and "Blonde on Blonde" by Nada Surf. John Travolta performs on "Barbara Allen" and “I Really Don’t Want to Know". The title track, "A Love Song For Bobby Long," is by Grayson Capps, the son of Ronald Everett Capps. The senior Capps wrote the novel that was adapted for the film.

== Release ==
The film premiered at the Venice Film Festival in September 2004. In order to qualify for Academy Awards consideration, it opened on eight screens in New York City and Los Angeles on December 29, 2004, earning $28,243 on its opening weekend. It played in 24 theaters in the US at its widest release. It eventually grossed $164,308 domestically and $1,676,952 in foreign markets for a total worldwide box office of $1,841,260.

== Critical reception ==
Stephen Holden of The New York Times wrote "[I]t dawdles along aimlessly for nearly two hours before coming up with a final revelation that is no surprise." He felt John Travolta was playing "a hammed-up, scenery-chewing variation of the brainy good ol' boy he played in Primary Colors," and thought Gabriel Macht's "understated performance" was "the deepest and subtlest of the three."

Roger Ebert of the Chicago Sun-Times wrote "What can be said is that the three actors inhabit this material with ease and gratitude: It is good to act on a simmer sometimes, instead of at a fast boil. It's unusual to find an American movie that takes its time. It's remarkable to listen to dialogue that assumes the audience is well-read. It is refreshing to hear the literate conversation. These are modest pleasures, but real enough."

Carina Chocano of the Los Angeles Times wrote that the film

is, deep-down, a redemptive makeover story drenched in alcohol, Southern literature, and the damp romanticism of the bohemian lush life in New Orleans. A lovely noble rot pervades the film in much the same way that it does the city, a longtime repository of lost-cause romanticism. If there's something a little bit moldy about the setup (drunken literary types, hope on the doorstep, healing from beyond the grave), the movie is no less charming or involving for it, and it's no less pleasant to succumb to its wayward allure and wastrel lyricism. Among other things, the characters ... really know how to turn a phrase, in itself a pleasure so rare it all but demands any flaws be forgiven.

Peter Travers of Rolling Stone rated the film two out of four stars, calling it "an elegant mess." He added "The actors labor to perform a rescue operation ... It's the stunning location photography of camera ace Elliot Davis that provides what the movie itself lacks: authenticity."

== Awards and nominations ==
Year	Award	Category	Nominee	Result
2005	62nd Golden Globe Awards	Best Actress in a Motion Picture – Drama	Scarlett Johansson	Nominated
2005	9th Prism Awards	Best Performance in a Feature Film	Scarlett Johansson	Nominated
2005	9th Prism Awards	Best Performance in a Feature Film	John Travolta	Nominated

== DVD release ==
The DVD was released in anamorphic widescreen format on April 19, 2005. It has audio tracks and subtitles in English, French, and Portuguese. Bonus features include commentary with screenwriter/director Shainee Gabel and cinematographer Elliot Davis, deleted scenes, and Behind the Scenes of A Love Song for Bobby Long with cast and crew interviews.
