= Scarlett Johansson discography =

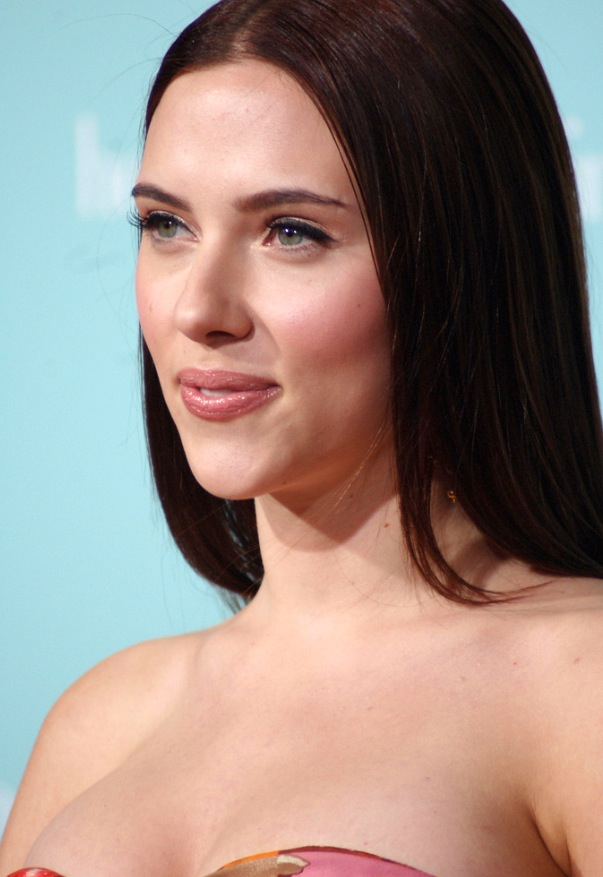
- Johansson in 2009
- Studio albums: 2
- EPs: 4
- Singles: 4
- Music videos: 2

American actress and singer Scarlett Johansson has released two studio albums, four extended plays (EPs), and four singles (including one as a featured artist). Her debut studio album, Anywhere I Lay My Head, was released on May 20, 2008. Reviews of the album were mixed, or average. Spin commented, "There's nothing particularly compelling about Scarlett Johansson's singing." Conversely, some critics found it to be "surprisingly alluring", "a bravely eccentric selection", and "a brilliant album" with "ghostly magic". Released on September 15, 2009, she and singer Pete Yorn recorded a collaborative album, Break Up, inspired by Serge Gainsbourg's duets with Brigitte Bardot.

== Albums ==
=== Solo studio albums ===
List of albums, with selected chart positions
Title	Album details	Peak chart positions										Sales
Title	Album details	US	AUT	BEL (FL)	FRA	GER	IRL	SPA	SWE	SWI	UK	Sales
Anywhere I Lay My Head	Released: May 20, 2008; Label: Atco; Format: CD, digital download	126	25	30	26	30	65	77	27	15	64	US: 19,000; WW: 25,000
"—" denotes releases that did not chart or were not released in that territory.

=== Collaborative studio albums ===
List of collaborative albums
Title	Details
Break Up (with Pete Yorn)	Released: September 15, 2009; Label: Atco, Rhino; Format: CD, digital download

== Extended plays ==
List of extended plays
Title	Details
Rhapsody Originals	Released: June 24, 2008; Label: Atco; Format: Digital download
Live Session	Released: July 15, 2008; Label: Rhino; Format: Digital download
Live at KCRW.com (with Pete Yorn)	Released: December 15, 2009; Label: Rhino; Format: CD, digital download
Apart (with Pete Yorn)	Released: June 1, 2018; Label: Capitol; Format: CD, digital download

== Singles ==
=== As lead artist ===
List of singles as lead artist, with selected chart positions and certifications
Title	Year	Peak chart positions							Album
Title	Year	US Bub.	BEL (FL) Tip	BEL (WA) Tip	FRA	GER	SWI	UK	Album
"Falling Down"	2008	21	23	—	—	—	70	—	Anywhere I Lay My Head
"Relator" (with Pete Yorn)	2009	—	—	10	19	91	57	189	Break Up
"Blackie's Dead" (with Pete Yorn)	2009	—	—	—	—	—	—	—	Break Up
"Bad Dreams" (with Pete Yorn)	2018	—	—	—	—	—	—	—	Apart
"—" denotes releases that did not chart or were not released in that territory.

=== As featured artist ===
Title	Year	Album
"Bonnie & Clyde" (Lulu Gainsbourg featuring Scarlett Johansson)	2012	From Gainsbourg to Lulu
"The Best Is Yet to Come" (Jeff Goldblum & the Mildred Snitzer Orchestra featuring Scarlett Johansson)	2025	Still Blooming

=== Promotional singles ===
Title	Year	Album
"Set It All Free"	2016	Sing

=== With band "The Singles" ===
Title	Year	Album
"Candy" (Note: Band with Este Haim, Holly Miranda, Kendra Morris, and Julia Haltigan)	2015	—N/a

== Guest appearances ==
Title	Year	Other artist(s)	Album
"Summertime"	2006	None	Unexpected Dreams
"I Don't Want to Grow Up"	2008	None	Newbury Comics 30th Anniversary
"Fannin' Street"	2008	None	Un Printemps – Vol. 2
"Last Goodbye"	2009	None	He's Just Not That Into You
"Shampoo"	2009	Pete Yorn	Une Rentrée – Vol. 2
"Bullet"	2010	Steel Train	Terrible Thrills: Vol. 1
"I'll Be Home for Christmas"	2011	Dean Martin	My Kind of Christmas
"One Whole Hour"	2011	None	Wretches & Jabberers
"Coteau Guidry"	2012	The Lost Bayou Ramblers	Mammoth Waltz
"Summertime"	2012	3D	Days of Grace
"Before My Time"	2012	J. Ralph and Joshua Bell	Chasing Ice
"The Moon Song"	2014	Joaquin Phoenix	The Moon Song
"Trust in Me"	2016	None	The Jungle Book
"I Don't Wanna"	2016	Beck Bennett	Sing: Original Motion Picture Soundtrack
"Set It All Free"	2016	None	Sing: Original Motion Picture Soundtrack
"Heads Will Roll"	2022	None	Sing 2: Original Motion Picture Soundtrack
"Where the Streets Have No Name"	2022	Tori Kelly, Taron Egerton, Reese Witherspoon, Nick Kroll	Sing 2: Original Motion Picture Soundtrack
"Stuck in a Moment You Can't Get Out of"	2022	None	Sing 2: Original Motion Picture Soundtrack
"I Still Haven't Found What I'm Looking For	2022	Bono	Sing 2: Original Motion Picture Soundtrack
"Christmas (Baby Please Come Home)"	2022	Keke Palmer, Tori Kelly, Taron Egerton, Reese Witherspoon, Nick Kroll	Sing 2: Original Motion Picture Soundtrack

== Music videos ==
As lead artist

Title	Year	Director
"Falling Down"	2008	Bennett Miller
"Relator"	2009	Jim Wright
"Bad Dreams"	2018	Sophie Muller

Guest appearances

Title	Year	Director	Artist
"City Girl"	2003	Sofia Coppola	Kevin Shields's music video
"When the Deal Goes Down"	2006	Bennett Miller	Bob Dylan's music video
"What Goes Around... Comes Around"	2007	Samuel Bayer	Justin Timberlake's music video
"Yes We Can"	2008	Jesse Dylan	will.i.am's music video

As director

Title	Year	Artist
"Hurry Hurry"	2011	Jessie Baylin's music video
