= Apart =

Apart may refer to:

- "Apart" (The Cure song), by The Cure on their 1992 album Wish
- Apart (album) (1995), by Paul Schütze
- "Apart" (Brandy song), by Brandy on her 2002 album Full Moon
- Apart (2011 film), an American drama
- Apart (2021 film), a documentary film
- Apart (EP), 2018 EP by Scarlett Johansson
- Apart (Léon album), 2020 album by Swedish singer Léon

== See also ==
- Apartness relation
