= J. D. King =

J. D. King may refer to:

- J. D. King (artist) (1951–2025), American comics artist and rock guitarist
- J. D. King (musician) (born 1984), American singer, songwriter and engineer
