= Through My Teeth =

2025 single by Spacey Jane

Single by Spacey Jane

from the album If That Makes Sense
- Released: 8 April 2025
- Genre: Indie rock
- Length: 3:25
- Label: AWAL
- Songwriters: Caleb Harper; Ashton Hardman-Le Cornu; Kieran Lama; Peppa Lane; Jackson Phillips
- Producer: Mike Crossey

Spacey Jane singles chronology
"How to Kill Houseplants" (2025)	"Through My Teeth" (2025)	"Whateverrrr" (2025)

"Through My Teeth" is a song by Australian indie rock band Spacey Jane. It was released on 8 April 2025, as the third single from their third studio album, If That Makes Sense. The song was written in collaboration with Jackson Phillips. It polled at number 31 in Triple J's Hottest 100 of 2025.

== Composition ==
"Through My Teeth" is an upbeat, dreamy guitar ballad with a "nostalgic swell," which features spacious synthesisers and a "pop-leaning chorus". Its lyrics, written from the perspective of frontman Caleb Harper, capture "the guilt and dissonance that come with growing up." More specifically, music critic Jules LeFevre writes that the song "obliquely references Harper shedding his religious upbringing and throwing himself headlong into partying at university." On If That Makes Sense, the album's ambient opening track "Intro" leads into "Through My Teeth".

== Release ==
"Through My Teeth" was issued as the third single from If That Makes Sense, following "All the Noise" and "How to Kill Houseplants". Upon release, the band said the song was one of their collective favourites from the forthcoming album.

Australian Prime Minister Anthony Albanese voted for "Through My Teeth" in Triple J's Hottest 100 of 2025, in which the song was polled at number 31.

== Personnel ==
- Caleb Harper – vocals, rhythm guitar, synthesiser
- Ashton Hardman-Le Cornu – lead guitar
- Peppa Lane – bass guitar
- Kieran Lama – drums, percussion
- Mike Crossey – production, programming, synthesisers
