= Caretakers (album) =

Studio album by Pete Yorn
- Released: August 9, 2019
- Recorded: 2018, 2019
- Studio: Jackson Phillips' home studio in Echo Park, California
- Genre: Alternative rock, indie rock
- Language: English
- Label: Shelly Music
- Producer: Jackson Phillips; Pete Yorn

Pete Yorn chronology
ArrangingTime (2016)	Caretakers (2019)	Pete Yorn Sings the Classics (2021)

Caretakers is a 2019 studio album by American rock singer-songwriter Pete Yorn. It has received mostly favorable reviews from critics, including 4 stars on Allmusic.com and featured the hit radio single “Calm Down”. The video for “Calm Down” had over 10 million views as of this writing.

== Critical reception ==
Caretakers received positive reviews from critics noted at review aggregator Metacritic. It has a weighted average score of 70 out of 100, based on five reviews. Editors at AllMusic Guide scored this release four out of five stars, with critic Stephen Thomas Erlewine characterizing it as "an appealing blend that sets it apart from most other albums in 2019, along with most of Yorn's catalog".

== Track listing ==
1. "Calm Down" (Jackson Phillips, Soko, Pete Yorn) – 2:55
2. "I Wanna Be the One" (Yorn) – 3:31
3. "Can't Stop You" (Phillips, Yorn) – 3:07
4. "Idols (We Don't Ever Have to Say Goodbye)" (Phillips, Yorn) – 2:54
5. "Do You Want to Love Again?" (Yorn) – 3:09
6. "Caretakers" (Phillips, Yorn) – 3:18
7. "Friends" (Yorn) – 4:10
8. "ECT" (Phillips, Yorn) – 3:29
9. "POV" (Phillips, Yorn) – 3:12
10. "Opal" (Yorn) – 2:44
11. "A Fire in the Sun" (Phillips, Yorn) – 2:18
12. "Try" (Phillips, Yorn) – 2:55

== Personnel ==
- Pete Yorn – acoustic and electric guitars; vocals; production; bass guitar on "Calm Down", “I Wanna Be the One”, "Idols (We Don't Ever Have to Say Goodbye)", “Do You Want To Love Again?”, "ECT", "POV", and "Opal"; synth bass on “I Wanna Be the One”; backing vocals on "Idols (We Don't Ever Have to Say Goodbye)" and “Do You Want To Love Again?”; banjo on "Friends" and "Opal"; percussion on "Friends" and "Opal"
- Allen Alcantara – art direction and layout
- Hazel English – vocals on "Calm Down"
- Shawn Everett – mastering
- Jackson Phillips – production; recording; mixing; drums and rhythm programming; backing vocals; electric guitar on "Calm Down", "I Wanna Be the One", “Can’t Stop You”, "Idols (We Don't Ever Have to Say Goodbye)", and “Do You Want to Love Again?”; synth on "Calm Down", “Do You Want to Love Again?”, "Friends", "ECT", "POV", "Opal", "A Fire in the Sun", and "Try"; synth bass on "Calm Down", “Do You Want to Love Again?”, "Caretakers”, "Friends", "Opal", and "A Fire in the Sun"; percussion on "Calm Down", "Idols (We Don't Ever Have to Say Goodbye)", “Do You Want to Love Again?”, and "Try"; acoustic guitar on "Calm Down" and “Can’t Stop You”; baritone guitar on "I Wanna Be the One"; juno synth on "I Wanna Be the One", “Can’t Stop You”, and "Opal"; juno synth bass on “Can’t Stop You”, "Caretakers”, and "ECT"; e-bow on “Can’t Stop You” and "Friends"; hi bass on "Idols (We Don't Ever Have to Say Goodbye)"; piano on "Idols (We Don't Ever Have to Say Goodbye)" and "Caretakers"; juno bass on "Idols (We Don't Ever Have to Say Goodbye)", "POV", and "Try"; bass guitar on "A Fire in the Sun"; keyboards on "Try"
- Beth Yorn – cover photograph
