= Pete Yorn (album) =

Studio album by Pete Yorn
- Released: September 28, 2010
- Studio: Wavelength Studios (Salem, OR)
- Genre: Rock
- Length: 42:20
- Label: Vagrant
- Producer: Black Francis

Pete Yorn chronology
Break Up (2009)	Pete Yorn (2010)	ArrangingTime (2016)

Pete Yorn, also titled as PY, is the fifth studio album by American singer-songwriter Pete Yorn. It was released on September 28, 2010, via Vagrant Records on September 28, 2010. Recording sessions took place at Wavelength Studio in Salem, Oregon. Production was handled by Black Francis with the song "Always", which was additionally produced by Robert Carranza.

The album debuted at number 66 on the Billboard 200, number 22 on the Top Rock Albums, number 15 on the Top Alternative Albums and number 13 on the Independent Albums charts with around 6,000 copies sold on its first week of release in the United States. As of January 2016, the album has sold 28,000 copies in the US.

== Critical reception ==
Professional ratings
Aggregate scores
Source	Rating
Metacritic	69/100
Review scores
Source	Rating
AllMusic	3.5/5 stars
Classic Rock	3.5/5 stars
Consequence of Sound	B
Drowned in Sound	2/10
musicOMH	3.5/5 stars
Rolling Stone	3/5 stars
Slant	2.5/5 stars
Spin	8/10 marks
Sputnikmusic	3.5/5
The A.V. Club	C+

Pete Yorn was met with generally favourable reviews from music critics. At Metacritic, which assigns a normalized rating out of 100 to reviews from mainstream publications, the album received an average score of 69 based on eleven reviews.

Peter Gerstenzang of Spin praised the album, stating: "from bracing opener "Precious Stone" to the chugging fan appreciation "Rock Crowd" to a heartfelt version of Gram Parsons' "Wheels", Yorn emerges with his most purposeful, affecting album yet". AllMusic's Stephen Thomas Erlewine wrote: "this album's often a bracing, propulsive listen, the hardest rock Yorn has ever recorded, even if it does suggest Yorn is like tofu, adapting the characteristics of whatever spices he's paired with". Andrew Burgess of musicOMH concluded: "here, we've got an album that kind of sums up Yorn's journey; this scruffy batch of songs is as exciting as anything Yorn's done in the last decade".

In mixed reviews, Christian Williams of The A.V. Club wrote: "the self-titled album he bashed out with Pixies frontman Frank Black before the recording sessions for Back And Fourth is seeing the light of day, and in spite of Black's assertion that he was attempting to strip Yorn and his songs down to their core essences, the results feel anonymous, cycling through half a dozen different voices while displaying only fleeting glimpses of the effortless pop chops that made Yorn so inescapable a decade ago". Jonathan Keefe of Slant resumed: "while that may not necessarily make Yorn any more distinctive on this album than on any of his previous efforts, Black's energy at least gives him more of an edge than the singer-songwriter has been known for in the past".

== Track listing ==
All tracks are written by Peter Joseph Yorn, except track 11 is written by Chris Hillman and Gram Parsons.

No.	Title	Length
1.	"Precious Stone"	3:26
2.	"Rock Crowd"	4:48
3.	"Velcro Shoes"	3:50
4.	"Paradise Cove I"	4:07
5.	"Badman"	3:13
6.	"The Chase"	4:04
7.	"Sans Fear"	4:17
8.	"Always"	3:27
9.	"Stronger Than"	3:39
10.	"Future Life"	4:11
11.	"Wheels"	3:18
Total length:		42:20

European version bonus track
No.	Title	Length
12.	"Favorite Song"	2:39

Deluxe edition bonus tracks
No.	Title	Length
12.	"Future Life" (Acoustic)	3:56
13.	"Precious Stone" (Acoustic)	3:00
14.	"Rock Crowd" (Acoustic)	3:37
15.	"Velcro Shoes" (Acoustic)	3:26

== Personnel ==
- Pete Yorn – vocals, guitar, harmonica (track 3), drums (track 4), piano (track 10)
- Silver Sorensen – backing vocals (track 2), bass (tracks: 1, 2, 9), double bass (track 11)
- Jason Carter – drums (tracks: 1–3, 5, 6, 7, 8, 9, 10), engineering, mixing
- Charles Normal – bass (tracks: 3, 5, 6, 8, 10), electric guitar (track 9), guitar (track 11)
- Charles Michael Kittridge "Black Francis" Thompson IV – guitar (track 4), producer
- Daniel Joseph Schmid – bass (tracks: 4, 7)
- Robert Carranza – additional producer (track 8)
- Bob Ludwig – mastering
- Ben Goetting – design
- Beth Kaltman – photography

== Charts ==
Chart (2010)	Peak position
US Billboard 200	66
US Top Rock Albums (Billboard)	22
US Top Alternative Albums (Billboard)	15
US Independent Albums (Billboard)	13
