= Do You Really Love Her =

Single by Spacey Jane

from the EP Exit Wounds
- Released: 13 March 2026
- Genre: Indie rock
- Length: 3:48
- Label: AWAL
- Songwriters: Caleb Harper, Ashton Hardman-Le Cornu, Peppa Lane, Kieran Lama, Sarah Aarons, Joel Little
- Producer: John Hill

Spacey Jane singles chronology
"Whateverrrr" (2025)	"Do You Really Love Her" (2026)	"I Never See Her" (2026)

"Do You Really Love Her" is a song by Australian indie rock band Spacey Jane. It was released via AWAL on 13 March 2026, as the lead single to their third extended play, Exit Wounds. The song, which features a prominent synth line and 80s-influenced drums, envisages frontman Caleb Harper being stood up on a cinema date, only to see his partner in the film. It peaked at number four on the ARIA Australian Artists Chart.

== Composition ==
"Do You Really Love Her" was written on Mulholland Drive, California, alongside Sarah Aarons and Joel Little. Spacey Jane previously collaborated with Aarons on several songs from their previous album, If That Makes Sense (2025), including "Whateverrrr".

In the studio, the musicians referenced 80s pub rock bands, including INXS, the Church and Icehouse, to create an expansive and dramatic sound with prominent synthesiser and punchy drums. Its intro was compared to Crowded House's "Don't Dream It's Over" but with a "brighter, more modern energy". Caleb Harper called the production a "deliberate creative experiment" for the band.

The song's lyrics, based on "part fiction, part reality", envisage Harper being stood up, only to see his date on a movie screen.

== Release ==
While written in the sessions for If That Makes Sense, "Do You Really Love Her" did not feature on that album, because it didn't feel like the right fit, according to the band. It was released on 13 March 2026, as the lead single to its companion extended play, Exit Wounds.

"Do You Really Love Her" reached number four on the ARIA Australian Artists Chart.
