= Go With It =

Go With It may refer to:

- "Go With It", song by American R&B band The Internet from Ego Death (album)
- "Go With It", song by MNDR produced by Tokimonsta Peter Wade Keusch
- "Go With It", song by Oliver from Full Circle (Oliver album)
- "Go With It", song by Pete Yorn Nightcrawler (album)
