= Relator =

Relator may refer to:

- Relator (group theory), a concept in the presentation of a group
- Relator (law), a legal term used in civil procedure
- "Relator" (song), a 2009 single by Pete Yorn and Scarlett Johansson

== See also ==
- Relator noun
