= Pastlife (album) =

Studio album by Day Wave
- Released: June 24, 2022
- Recorded: 2021
- Genre: Dream pop; indie rock
- Length: 29:50
- Label: PIAS

Day Wave chronology
Crush (2020)	Pastlife (2022)

Singles from Pastlife
- 1. "Before We Knew" Released: August 11, 2021; 2. "Where Do You Go" Released: November 9, 2021; 3. "Pastlife" Released: March 29, 2022; 4. "Loner" Released: May 10, 2022

Pastlife is the second studio album by American indie rock musician Jackson Phillips, under the name Day Wave. The album was released on June 24, 2022, through PIAS Recordings.

Four singles were released ahead of the album: "Before We Knew", "Where Do You Go", "Pastlife", and "Loner".

== Critical reception ==
Professional ratings
Review scores
Source	Rating
AllMusic	3/5 stars
Pitchfork	6.9/10
Sputnikmusic	3.4/5

Pastlife received mixed to positive reviews from contemporary music critics. In a positive review, Brady Brickner-Wood, writing for Pitchfork described the album as "characteristically crisp, concise guitar pop". Brickner-Wood further said of Pastlife that it "is a coming-of-age album for 30-year-olds, concerned with newfound commitments and misbegotten ambitions". Timothy Monger, writing for AllMusic, gave Pastlife a three-star rating saying that "despite a handful of pretty melodies and a yawning sense of melancholia, Pastlife is rather unassuming, passing by in an affable 30 minutes of chiming guitars, burbling synths, and hushed introspection. If anything, it is a little smaller in scope than Day Wave's earlier releases, though painted with the same palette of sounds and moods".

In a staff review for Sputnikmusic, the album was described Phillips as "happy retreading the unambitious pleasantries of mid-2010’s bedroom-drem".

== Track listing ==
All music is composed by Jackson Phillips.

No.	Title	Length
1.	"See You When The End's Near" (featuring KennyHoopla)
2.	"Pastlife"
3.	"Where Do You Go"
4.	"Blue"
5.	"Loner"
6.	"Before We Knew"
7.	"Great Expectations"
8.	"We Used to Be Young"
9.	"Heart to Rest"
10.	"Apartment Complex" (featuring Hazel English)
Total length:		29:50
