= Live from New Jersey =

Live album by Pete Yorn
- Released: 2004
- Genre: Rock
- Label: Columbia

Pete Yorn chronology
| Day I Forgot (2003) | Live from New Jersey (2004) | Westerns EP (2006) |

Live from New Jersey is a live album released by Pete Yorn in 2004. It was recorded in a theatre in Morristown on October 29, 2003.

This release gives a full concert performance of Yorn, who mixes up tracks from both studio albums he had recorded up until that point. While the emphasis is on his debut album, musicforthemorningafter (10 of its 14 tracks are featured here, including "Strange Condition," "On Your Side," "Black" and "Life on a Chain"), there are seven tracks from Day I Forgot. The remainder tracks are covers and one new song.

Exclaim! noted about the album, "it captures Yorn and his band on a good night in front of an intimate, small-town audience."

== Album information ==
The album is a recording of Yorn's performance at the Community Theatre in Morristown, New Jersey.

When Yorn sings "I was killed in half a day, I hadn't time to regret you, R-E-A-C-T" in the song "Life on a Chain", he is referencing the song "Harborcoat" by R.E.M. from their album Reckoning. In "Harborcoat", Michael Stipe sings "There's a splinter in your eye and it reads 'react,' R-E-A-C-T."

== Track listing ==
Disc one

1. "I Feel Good Again" (Junior Kimbrough cover)
2. "Pass Me By"
3. "Black"
4. "Carlos (Don't Let It Go to Your Head)"
5. "Turn of the Century"
6. "Do You Wanna Dance/Closet"
7. "Long Way Down"
8. "Lose You"
9. "Just Another"
10. "Strange Condition"

Disc two

1. "Life on a Chain"
2. "Bandstand in the Sky"
3. "Suspicious Minds" (written by Mark James; popularized by Elvis Presley and then by a Waylon Jennings/Jessi Colter duet)
4. "On Your Side"
5. "June"
6. "Crystal Village"
7. "For Nancy ('Cos It Already Is)"
8. "Burrito"
9. "All at Once"
10. "Atlantic City" (Bruce Springsteen cover)/"Murray"

== Personnel ==
- Luke Adams – drums
- Jason Johnson – guitar
- Joe Kennedy Jr. – guitar, harmonica, piano, background vocals
- R. Walt Vincent – bass guitar
- Pete Yorn – guitar, harmonica, lead vocals
