= ArrangingTime =

Studio album by Pete Yorn
- Released: March 11, 2016
- Studio: Various: Engineering; Loma Lada Studio (Los Angeles, CA); Pap Pap's Palace (Venice, CA); Spring Street Sound (Los Angeles, CA); Atomic Halo Studios (Los Angeles, CA); The Clinic (Los Angeles, CA); Mixing; The Living Room (Santa Clarita, CA); Spring Street Sound (Los Angeles, CA); Subtle McNugget (downtown Los Angeles, CA); Atomic Halo Studios (Los Angeles, CA); Mastering; The Lodge (New York, NY)
- Genre: Rock
- Length: 43:56
- Label: Capitol
- Producer: Jeff Trott; Marc Dauer; Pete Yorn; R. Walt Vincent; Scott Seiver; Sunny Levine

Pete Yorn chronology
PY (2010)	ArrangingTime (2016)	Caretakers (2019)

Singles from ArrangingTime
- 1. "Summer Was a Day" Released: November 6, 2015; 2. "Lost Weekend" Released: January 8, 2016; 3. "Halifax" Released: February 5, 2016; 4. "I'm Not the One" Released: February 26, 2016

ArrangingTime is the sixth solo studio album by American musician Pete Yorn. It was released on March 11, 2016, via Capitol Records. The album was engineered at Loma Lada Studio, Spring Street Sound, Atomic Halo Recording and The Clinic in Los Angeles and at Pap Pap's Palace in Venice. The production was handled by Yorn himself together with R. Walt Vincent, Scott Seiver, Sunny Levine, Jeff Trott and Marc Dauer.

The album peaked at number 63 on the Billboard 200, number 7 on the Top Rock Albums, number 3 on the Americana/Folk Albums and number 5 on the Top Alternative Albums charts in the United States.

It was preceded by four digital singles: "Summer Was a Day", "Lost Weekend", "Halifax" and "I'm Not the One". The album's second single, "Lost Weekend", became the only charted song, reaching number 16 on the Adult Alternative Airplay and number 47 on the Hot Rock & Alternative Songs charts in the US. Its lead single, "Summer Was a Day", can be heard in the ninth episode of the second season of American television drama series The Royals and in the eighth episode of the sixth season of the American television comedy drama Shameless. Music videos were shot for the songs "Lost Weekend" (directed by Maria Innes Manchego), "I'm Not the One" (starring Charlotte McKinney) and "She Was Weird" (directed by Flávia Lucini and Rogerio Mesquita).

== Critical reception ==
Professional ratings
Aggregate scores
Source	Rating
AnyDecentMusic?	6.2/10
Metacritic	69/100
Review scores
Source	Rating
ABC News	3.5/5 stars
AllMusic	3.5/5 stars
Classic Rock	4/5 stars
Drowned in Sound	4/10
Entertainment Weekly	B+
Paste	7.5/10
PopMatters	5/10

ArrangingTime was met with generally favorable reviews from music critics. At Metacritic, which assigns a normalized rating out of 100 to reviews from mainstream publications, the album received an average score of 69 based on eleven reviews. The aggregator AnyDecentMusic? has the critical consensus of the album at a 6.2 out of 10, based on eight reviews.

Eric Renner Brown of Entertainment Weekly stated: "while Yorn's simplicity hinders unobjectionable but unremarkable ballads like "Shopping Mall", he rarely plays the weepy balladeer on ArrangingTime and keeps momentum relatively strong throughout". Philip Wilding of Classic Rock wrote: "while the results haven't got the near-reckless zeal of the young Yorn's records, the sense of longing reflects the broken-down feel--strumming acoustic guitars, the light thrum of a snare--of some of the material he was writing back in the early 2000s". Lee Zimmerman of Paste praised the album, saying "it's primarily the tone and temperament that varies from track to track. It's a superb sound, and that's one of many reasons why ArrangingTime feels like time well spent". AllMusic's Stephen Thomas Erlewine found "on this record, Yorn seems to master mood more than tune, but that winds up being to his benefit. This tonal elasticity gives ArrangingTime an enveloping warmth, one that is alluring even if it tends to shift concentration away from the songwriting that allegedly was his greatest strength".

In mixed reviews, Alexandra Fletcher of PopMatters resumed: "this record is late '90s/early '00s radio rock nostalgic and comforting. It feels good, but like most things, not as good as the first time". Cai Trefor of Drowned in Sound claimed "his dull lyrics get made more of a point of through repetition, they shine brighter than his well-crafted moments of introspection. There's only so many times listening to a man singing about someone waiting at a bus stop can be bearable".

== Track listing ==
No.	Title	Writer(s)	Producer(s)	Length
1.	"Summer Was a Day"	Peter Joseph Yorn	Scott Seiver; Pete Yorn	3:58
2.	"Lost Weekend"	Yorn	Sunny Levine; Pete Yorn	4:11
3.	"Halifax"	Yorn	Scott Seiver; Pete Yorn	2:51
4.	"In Your Head"	Yorn	R. Walt Vincent; Pete Yorn	4:04
5.	"She Was Weird"	Yorn	Sunny Levine; Pete Yorn	4:17
6.	"I'm Not the One"	Yorn	Jeff Trott; Pete Yorn	3:35
7.	"Shopping Mall"	Yorn	R. Walt Vincent; Pete Yorn	3:51
8.	"Roses"	Yorn	R. Walt Vincent; Pete Yorn	3:52
9.	"Screaming at the Setting Sun"	Yorn	R. Walt Vincent; Pete Yorn	2:46
10.	"Walking Up"	Yorn; Marc Dauer	Marc Dauer; Pete Yorn; R. Walt Vincent (add.)	3:14
11.	"Tomorrow"	Yorn	R. Walt Vincent; Pete Yorn	3:14
12.	"This Fire"	Yorn; Jeff Tucker; Darren Geare	R. Walt Vincent; Pete Yorn	4:03
Total length:				43:56

== Personnel ==
- Pete Yorn – voice, acoustic guitar (tracks: 1, 3, 4, 6, 8, 10, 11), electric guitar (tracks: 1, 3, 4, 8, 9, 11, 12), bass guitar (track 1), guitar (tracks: 2, 5), synthesizer (tracks: 2, 5), electric bass (track 3), bass (tracks: 4, 5, 8, 9, 12), drums (tracks: 4, 8, 9), drum machine (track 4), harmony vocals (track 6), electric piano (track 6), baritone guitar (track 7), Rhodes electric piano (tracks: 7, 11), bass keyboards (track 7), backing vocals (tracks: 9, 12), additional drums (track 10), piano (track 12), producer
- Scott Seiver – electric guitar (track 1), synthesizer (track 1), drums (tracks: 1, 3), percussion (track 1), Wurlitzer electric piano (track 3), bass keyboards (track 3), electric bass (track 3), mellotron (track 3), tambourine (track 3), shaker (track 3), producer (tracks: 1, 3), engineering (tracks: 1, 3), additional editing (track 5)
- Sunny Levine – synthesizer (tracks: 2, 5), programming (tracks: 2, 5), producer (tracks: 2, 5), engineering (tracks: 2, 5)
- Gabe Noel – cello bass (track 2)
- R. Walt Vincent – electric guitar (tracks: 4, 7), Hammond B3 organ (track 4), celesta (track 4), drum programming (tracks: 4, 7, 9, 11, 12), synthesizer (tracks: 7, 11), piano (track 8), Wurlitzer electric piano (track 8), hurdy-gurdy (track 8), marimba (track 8), tubular bells (track 8), cello mellotron (track 8), string arranger (tracks: 8, 12), backing vocals (tracks: 9, 12), guitar solo (track 9), keyboards (track 9), flute (track 10), cymbal (track 10), mellotron strings (track 10), pump organ (track 12), producer (tracks: 4, 7, 8, 9, 11, 12), additional producer (track 10), engineering (tracks: 4, 7, 8, 9, 11, 12), mixing (tracks: 4, 7, 8, 10, 11, 12)
- Amir Yaghmai – synthesizer (track 5)
- Jeff Trott – acoustic guitar (track 6), baritone guitar (track 6), tenor guitar (track 6), electric guitar (track 6), bass guitar (track 6), drum programming (track 6), producer (track 6), engineering (track 6), mixing (track 6)
- Marc Dauer – guitar (track 10), keyboards (track 10), piano (track 10), bass (track 10), drums (track 10), synthesizer strings (track 10), producer (track 10), engineering (track 10)
- Kennie Takahashi – mixing (tracks: 1, 2, 3, 9)
- Shawn Everett – mixing (track 5)
- J.D. King – additional recording (track 8)
- Emily Lazar – mastering
- Andy West Design – art direction
- Jim Wright – photography
- Kevin Yorn – back cover photography
- Ryan Del Vecchio – A&R administrator

== Charts ==
Chart (2016)	Peak position
US Billboard 200	63
US Top Rock Albums (Billboard)	7
US Americana/Folk Albums (Billboard)	3
US Top Alternative Albums (Billboard)	5
