= Exit Wounds (disambiguation) =

Exit Wounds is a 2001 American action film.

Exit Wounds may also refer to:

- Exit wound, in medical traumatology, a type of injury associated with a penetrating trauma

== Music ==
- Exit Wounds (The Haunted album), 2014
- Exit Wounds (The Wallflowers album), 2021
- Exit Wounds (soundtrack), from the 2001 film
- Exit Wounds (EP), by Spacey Jane, 2026
- "Exit Wounds", a song by Placebo from Loud Like Love, 2013
- "Exit Wounds", a song by the Script from Science & Faith, 2010

== Other uses ==
- Exit Wounds (graphic novel), by Rutu Modan
- "Exit Wounds" (Flashpoint), an episode of Flashpoint
- "Exit Wounds" (Torchwood), an episode of Torchwood
