= Wake Up! (Hazel English album) =

Studio album by Hazel English
- Released: April 24, 2020
- Recorded: 2018–2019
- Genre: Dream pop
- Label: Polyvinyl Records
- Producers: Justin Raisen; Ben H. Allen

Hazel English chronology
Just Give In/Never Going Home (2017)	Wake Up! (2020)	Real Life (2024)

Singles from Wake Up!
- 1. "Shaking" Released: November 6, 2019; 2. "Off My Mind" Released: January 29, 2020; 3. "Combat" Released: March 4, 2020; 4. "Five and Dime" Released: April 7, 2020

Wake Up! (stylized as Wake UP!) is the debut studio album by Australian-American indie pop musician Hazel English released on April 24, 2020. The album is produced by Justin Raisen and Ben H. Allen.

== Background and recording ==
On May 12, 2017, English released her first EP Just Give In/Never Going Home. In 2018, she started working on her debut album.

In an interview on BBC Radio 1's Indie Show with Jack Saunders, English said that the album idea came from her passiveness in everyday life and the need of changing it, of doing the things that she wanted to do and move on with life. The album title is a literal reference from waking up from sleep and a mindfulness feeling to life.

Produced with the help of Justin Raisen and Ben H. Allen, according to Polyvinyl Records the album is a "bigger, lusher, and more live-sounding" album from her discography.

=== Singles ===
On November 6, 2019, the first single from the album was released. "Shaking" was described by Stereogum as "'60s psychedelia". The song was co-written with Blake Stranathan and produced by Justin Raisen. The music video for the single was directed by Erin S. Murray.

On January 29, 2020, she released the second single "Off My Mind". According to English, the song is "about feeling stuck in a situation but too afraid to make a move. It's about the limbo state between where you are and where you want to be."

== Critical reception ==
Professional ratings
Aggregate scores
Source	Rating
AnyDecentMusic?	6.8/10
Metacritic	73/100
Review scores
Source	Rating
AllMusic	3.5/5 stars
Clash	8/10
Exclaim!	9/10
The Independent	3/5 stars
The Line of Best Fit	8/10
musicOMH	3/5 stars
Paste Magazine	6.9/10
Under the Radar	6/10 stars

Wake Up! received generally positive reviews from music critics. On the review aggregate website Metacritic, Wake Up! received a score of 73, based on 11 reviews, indicating "generally favorable reviews". Aggregator AnyDecentMusic? gave it 6.8 out of 10, based on their assessment of the critical consensus.

AllMusic critic Marcy Donelson called the album "a more vibrant, polished affair than her [English's] EPs" and stated that it is an "album that aims to please and largely succeeds." Writing for Clash, Rae Niwa wrote that English, on the album, "pivots for a musical array of expanded soundscapes that articulate a dynamic evolution of her music". She further praised the album for its "elevated energy" and English's way of expanding her "work", thus comparing it to previous releases from the artist. Niwa ended her review by stating that "Hazel English has delved into a sophistication that dynamically blends her previous music to create an oscillation of hard and soft that exudes in her tonality." Alisha Mughal of Exclaim! acclaimed the album, stating that each track on the record "is unique and will sweetly burrow itself into your mind, and this is due to English's deftness with hooks and melodies." Mughal also praised English's vocals and stated that the album is the "perfect soundtrack to the next few months that may feel like an eternity under COVID-19." Hayley Milross, reviewer for The Line of Best Fit, wrote that "whilst English's smooth tone and poetic songwriting paints a dreamy soundscape, what English delivers here primarily, is concise honesty. Rather than washing over fantasised ideals, she tells us exactly how it is, how it makes her feel and what she wants to do in order to gain her power back."

Elisa Bray of The Independent wrote that "Wake Up! may tackle weighty themes of capitalism and power struggles in relationships, but the woozy ambience of its shoegaze and Sixties-inspired pop is not exactly going to propel you into an invigorating new way of life [...] This graceful debut is led by a voice so sweetly soothing and expressive that it recalls both Lana del Rey and Hope Sandoval."

== Track listing ==
All tracks are written by Hazel English.

Wake Up! track listing
No.	Title	Length
1.	"Born Like"	3:46
2.	"Shaking"	3:33
3.	"Wake Up!"	3:35
4.	"Off My Mind"	3:38
5.	"Combat"	3:48
6.	"Five and Dime"	2:53
7.	"Like a Drug"	4:04
8.	"Waiting"	3:33
9.	"Milk and Honey"	3:12
10.	"Work It Out"	4:33
Total length:		36:35

== Personnel ==
- Hazel English – vocals

Production

- Justin Raisen
- Ben H. Allen

Engineering

- Anthony Paul Lopez - Recording and mixing engineer
- Ben Etter - Recording and mixing engineer
- Heba Kadry - Mastering engineer
- Ainjel Emme - Additional engineering

== See also ==
- List of 2020 albums
