= Hawaii (Pete Yorn album) =

Studio album by Pete Yorn
- Released: June 17, 2022
- Genre: Rock
- Length: 33:15
- Language: English
- Label: Shelly Music
- Producer: Jackson Phillips; Pete Yorn

Pete Yorn chronology
Pete Yorn Sings the Classics (2021)	Hawaii (2022)

Hawaii is a 2022 studio album by American rock singer-songwriter Pete Yorn, made in collaboration with Day Wave.

== Reception ==
Writing for Albumism, Justin Chadwick gave this album five out of five stars, comparing it favorably to the strong songwriting in Yorn's career and noting that "the impermanence and intangibility of love define... the album's standout moments". Hawaii was named Album of the Week in Tinnitist, where critic Darryl Sterdan calls it "the latest in a continuing series of understatedly magnificent, tasteful creations". Tom Lanham of Paste also considers Hawaii "one of his most memorable collections".

== Track listing ==
All music by Pete Yorn and Jackson Phillips and all lyrics by Pete Yorn, except where noted

1. "Elizabeth Taylor" – 3:15
2. "Never Go" – 2:36
3. "'Til the End" (lyrics by Sticky and Yorn) – 3:39
4. "Blood" – 3:33
5. "Ransom" (lyrics and music by Yorn) – 3:56
6. "Also, Roses" – 3:23
7. "Miss Alien" – 3:28
8. "Fred and Wilma" – 3:08
9. "Further" – 3:01
10. "Stay Away" – 3:16

== Personnel ==
- Pete Yorn – guitar, vocals, photography, production
- Brandy Flower – layout, typography
- Greg Gehringer – mastering
- Adam Hawkins – mixing on "Elizabeth Taylor", "Never Go", "'Til the End", and "Ransom"
- Jackson Phillips – engineering, mixing (except for tracks by Adam Hawkins), production

== Chart performance ==
"Elizabeth Taylor" reached 31 on Billboard's Adult Alternative Airplay chart.

== See also ==
- Lists of 2022 albums
