= If That Makes Sense =

2025 album by Spacey Jane

Studio album by Spacey Jane
- Released: 9 May 2025
- Studios: Patchwork, Los Angeles
- Genre: Indie rock
- Labels: AWAL; Concord (Note: Issued via Concord Records outside of Australia and New Zealand.)
- Producer: Mike Crossey

Spacey Jane chronology
Here Comes Everybody (2022)	If That Makes Sense (2025)	Exit Wounds (2026)

Singles from If That Makes Sense
- 1. "All the Noise" Released: 16 January 2025; 2. "How to Kill Houseplants" Released: 28 February 2025; 3. "Through My Teeth" Released: 11 April 2025; 4. "Whateverrrr" Released: 9 May 2025; 5. "Estimated Delivery" Released: 2025

If That Makes Sense is the third studio album by Australian indie rock band Spacey Jane, released on 9 May 2025 via AWAL. It was produced by Mike Crossey and written alongside Day Wave and Sarah Aarons. The album was supported by five singles including "All the Noise", "Through My Teeth" and "Whateverrrr". It debuted at number two on the ARIA charts. At the 2025 J Awards, the album was nominated for Australian Album of the Year.

At the AIR Awards of 2026, it was nominated for Best Independent Rock Album or EP.

== Background ==
In early 2023, Spacey Jane frontman Caleb Harper relocated to Los Angeles for recording and writing sessions that would inform their third album. He said to NME that the band would be more deliberate in finding time for writing the project, and that they would "try and ease into it a little more" than they did for their prior album, Here Comes Everybody (2022). They took a hiatus from touring for over a year while working on the record, returning to the stage with a surprise pop-up show at Rosemount Hotel, Perth on 14 January 2025.

== Composition ==
If That Makes Sense was written over two years from February 2022, with closing track "August" in particular taking a year and a half to finish. The band wrote about 40 songs during their time in Los Angeles. Pre-production took eight weeks, and they recorded the album over 12 weeks, finishing in March 2024. It was produced by Mike Crossey, best known for his work with the 1975 and Arctic Monkeys. The band self-funded the record's production.

Harper as lead lyricist worked alongside external songwriters for the first time, bringing in Day Wave and Sarah Aarons, in a process he described as intimidating at first, but upon reflection "liberating to have that conflict of ideas." Lyrically, If That Makes Sense is a return to the introspective storytelling showcased on their first album, Sunlight (2020). In comparison, Here Comes Everybody was more of an outward-facing collection of observations from the perspective of a listener.

== Release ==
The album's title, cover and release date was announced on 16 January 2025, alongside the release of its lead single "All the Noise". Spacey Jane signed with Concord Records for its distribution outside of Australia and New Zealand. The band wrote in a media release: "We stepped off the cliff everyday and loved it and we have never been happier with our work than we are now." The second single, "How to Kill Houseplants", was issued in late February alongside the release of concert dates for Australia and New Zealand. "Through My Teeth" followed in early April. "Whateverrrr" was released on 9 May 2025 as the album's fourth single.

== Tour ==
Spacey Jane embarked on a 21-date tour of Australia from June to July 2025. The run included seven sold-out nights at Freo Social in Fremantle, setting a venue record for the longest residency. The national circuit sold 45,000 tickets in just the first week of sales. From September to November, they played shows across the United States, Canada, the United Kingdom and Europe.

== Critical reception ==
Writing for Rolling Stone Australia, Lars Brandle called the album's lyrics introspective and an "exploration of love, loss, learning and life" with "guitars swinging and hearts open".

Professional ratings
Review scores
Source	Rating
Rolling Stone Australia	4/5 stars

Jonah Taylor from The Live Wire said "With If That Makes Sense, Spacey Jane have well and truly stepped into their next chapter. The third album from the Fremantle-based four-piece feels like both a sonic evolution and a deep dive into personal struggles—one that’s as emotionally raw as it is musically ambitious."

Sullivan Jordan from Off the Record Press said "At its core, If That Makes Sense is a love story and an emotional rumination on love lost and how, sometimes, all we need is to feel love, even if it is with someone at the wrong time and place. Many of the tracks reflect on regret for how a relationship ended, even if both parties painfully understood how inevitable a tragic ending would be."

== Track listing ==
All tracks are written by Ashton Hardman-Le Cornu, Caleb Harper, Kieran Lama, and Peppa Lane, with additional writers noted.

If That Makes Sense track listing
No.	Title	Writer(s)	Length
1.	"Intro"		0:33
2.	"Through My Teeth"	Jackson Phillips	3:25
3.	"Whateverrrr"	Sarah Aarons	2:58
4.	"All the Noise"		2:59
5.	"Impossible to Say"	Tobias Kuhn	3:31
6.	"How to Kill Houseplants"	Aarons	3:28
7.	"I Can't Afford to Lose You"		3:44
8.	"So Much Taller"	Phillips	3:20
9.	"The More That It Hurts"	Phillips	3:02
10.	"Estimated Delivery"	Aarons	3:25
11.	"Falling Apart"	Marshall Vore	4:19
12.	"ILY the Most"	Aarons	2:49
13.	"August"		3:58
Total length:			41:38

== Personnel ==
Credits adapted from the album's liner notes.

=== Spacey Jane ===
- Ashton Hardman-Le Cornu – guitar (track 1), lead guitar (2–13), acoustic guitar (5)
- Caleb Harper – vocals (all tracks), guitar (track 1), rhythm guitar (2–13), synthesiser (2–5, 10, 11, 13), marxophone (11)
- Kieran Lama – drums, percussion (all tracks); drum programming (track 10)
- Peppa Lane – bass guitar (all tracks), vocals (track 13)

=== Additional personnel ===
- Mike Crossey – production, mixing, programming (all tracks); synthesiser (tracks 2–5, 10, 11, 13), drum programming (10)
- Robin Schmidt – mastering
- Stephen Sesso – engineering
- Daniel Chae – strings (tracks 3, 5)
- Alex Casnoff – piano (tracks 12, 13), synthesiser (13)

== Charts ==
=== Weekly charts ===
Weekly chart performance for If That Makes Sense
Chart (2025)	Peak position
Australian Albums (ARIA)	2
New Zealand Albums (RMNZ)	20
Scottish Albums (Official Charts)	27

=== Year-end charts ===
Year-end chart performance for If That Makes Sense
Chart (2025)	Position
Australian Albums (ARIA)	68
