= Chris Moore (music producer) =

American record producer, mixer, and recording engineer

- Born: Christopher Moore; Baltimore, Maryland, United States
- Occupations: Record producer, mixer
- Writing career
- Years active: 2001–present

Chris Moore is an American record producer, mixer, and recording engineer currently based in New York, New York. He has produced, recorded and mixed albums by Midnight Juggernauts, TV On The Radio, Scarlett Johansson, Yeah Yeah Yeahs, Yeasayer, Au Revoir Simone, Foals, Dragons of Zynth, and The Ohsees.

== Biography ==
Chris Moore was born in Baltimore, Maryland, United States, and began playing and recording music as a teenager. After working on a number of solo electronic projects and low-budget independent bands in the 1990s, he moved to New York City in 2002 and began working with local artists such as TV On The Radio, Yeah Yeah Yeahs, and Liars. In addition to producing, recording, and mixing, Moore is also a keyboard player and synthesizer programmer who has created custom synth sounds for bands such as Midnight Juggernauts, Yeah Yeah Yeahs, Scarlett Johansson, and Suckers. Moore has also worked with a number of producers on remixes.

== Selected discography ==
- Sebastien Tellier "A Girl Is a Gun" (mix) 2017 Record Makers
- Kent "La Grande Illusion" (mix) 2017
- Erotic Market "Should I" EP (mix) 2016
- Tahiti Boy & The Palmtree Family "Songs of Vertigo" (mix, additional recording) 2015 Edge of Town
- Chocolat "Tss Tss" LP (mix) 2015 Grosse Boite
- Believe in Baltimore Lower Dens/Future Islands/Celebration/Baltimore student collaboration 2015 (mix)
- Cologne "Sacred/Mine" single (mix) 2015 Hit City
- Tahiti Boy & The Palmtree Family "All That You Are" EP (mix, add'l recording) 2014 Edge of Town
- Erotic Market "BlahBlahrians" LP (mix) 2014 Jarring Effects
- David Giguere "Casablanca" LP (mix) 2014 Audiogram
- The Blow "The Blow" LP (mix, synthesizer) 2013 Kanine
- Jimmy Hunt "Maladie d'Amour" LP (mix) 2013 Dare to Care
- Aaron Cohen "Potential Fans" Mixtape, "Stanley Kubrick" single (mix) 2013 Decon
- Pien Feith "Tough Love" LP (production, recording, synthesizers, mix) 2013 V2 Benelux
- Tahiti Boy & The Palmtree Family "Fireman" EP (mix) 2012 Edge Of Town
- Alice Cohen "Pink Keys" LP (mix, overdubs) 2012 Olde English Spelling Bee/Crinoline
- Black Marble "A Different Arrangement" (mix, mastering) 2012 Hardly Art
- Sofa Club "Actual Video" EP (mix) 2012 Muscular
- Tijuana Cartel "M1" LP and "White Dove" EP (production, recording, mix, synthesizers) 2011 self-released
- Thank You "Golden Worry"LP (mix) 2011 Thrill Jockey
- Midnight Juggernauts "The Crystal Axis" LP, "Vital Signs" single, "This New Technology" single, (rec/mix/keyboards) 2009–10 Siberia/Acephale
- Rain Machine LP (mix/overdubs) 2009 Anti
- Miles Benjamin Anthony Robinson "Summer Of Fear" LP (vocal rec/mix) 2009 Saddle Creek
- Scarlett Johansson "Anywhere I Lay My Head" 2008 (recording/mix/keyboards) Rhino
- Suckers "Wild Smile" LP (production/rec/mix) Frenchkiss, "Suckers" EP 2009 (production/rec/mix) IAMSOUND, "Save Your Love For Me" 7" (production/rec) Insound
- Yeasayer "All Hour Cymbals" 2008 (mix) We Are Free
- Yeah Yeah Yeahs "Is Is" 2008 (mix-live tracks), "It's Blitz" 2009 (recording) Interscope
- Holly Miranda "The Magician's Private Library" LP 2010 (recording/mix) XL Recordings
- TV On The Radio "Young Liars", "Desperate Youth...", "Return to Cookie Mountain", "Dear Science", various singles, etc. 2003-8 (recording/mix/inst) Interscope/4AD/Touch And Go
- Dave Sitek "With a Girl Like You" from "Dark Was The Night" benefit comp 2009 (mix) 4AD
- Thee OhSees "Singles Collection" 2009, "The Master's Bedroom..." 2008, "Sux Blood" 2007, "Cool Death Of Island Raiders" 2006 (recording/mix/mastering) Narnack/Tom/etc
- Foals "Antidotes" 2008 (recording) Transgressive/Sub Pop
- Au Revoir Simone "The Bird Of Music" 2007 (mix) Moshi Moshi
- Liars "They Were Wrong So We Drowned" 2004 (mix) Mute

plus remixes for The Knife, Beck, Queens Of The Stone Age, Nat King Cole, Lee Scratch Perry, Gary B and the Notions, Alice Cohen, and more
