= Pete Yorn Sings the Classics =

Studio album by Pete Yorn
- Released: January 15, 2021
- Recorded: 2020
- Genre: Rock
- Length: 31:14
- Language: English
- Label: Shelley Music
- Producer: Marc Dauer; Pete Yorn

Pete Yorn chronology
Caretakers (2019)	Pete Yorn Sings the Classics (2021)	Hawaii (2022)

Pete Yorn Sings the Classics is a 2021 studio album from American rock singer-songwriter Pete Yorn, performing cover versions.

== Reception ==
Daniel Kohn of Spin notes the diversity of genres and styles on this album and praises Yorn for his collaborators Liz Phair and Rami Jaffee. In American Songwriter, Jim Beviglia characterizes this release as "outstanding", noting the "affection and care" that the artist employed when choosing his covers.

== Track listing ==
1. "Here Comes Your Man" (Frank Black, by The Pixies) – 2:39
2. "Lay Lady Lay" (Bob Dylan, by Dylan) – 3:32
3. "Theme from Mahogany (Do You Know Where You're Going To)" (Gerry Goffin and Michael Masser, by Diana Ross) – 2:31
4. "They Don't Know" (Kirsty MacColl, by MacColl) – 2:59
5. "More Than This" (Bryan Ferry, by Roxy Music) – 3:30
6. "Surfer Girl" (Brian Wilson, by The Beach Boys) – 2:58
7. "Ten Storey Love Song" (John Squire, by Stone Roses) – 3:19
8. "I Am a Rock" (Paul Simon, by Simon & Garfunkel) – 3:27
9. "New Age" (Lou Reed, by The Velvet Underground) – 3:34
10. "Moon River" (music by Henry Mancini and lyrics by Johnny Mercer, by Audrey Hepburn) – 2:44

== Personnel ==
- Pete Yorn – vocals, drums, guitar production
- Marc Dauer – guitar, engineering, production
- Shawn Everett – mixing, mastering
- Johannes Gamble – graphic design
- Rami Jaffee – keyboards
- Liz Phair – backing vocals on "Here Comes Your Man" and "Theme from Mahogany (Do You Know Where You're Going To)"
- David Ralicke – horns
- Tim Walker – pedal steel guitar
- Beth Yorn – cover photography

== See also ==
- List of 2021 albums
