= Whateverrrr =

2025 single by Spacey Jane

Single by Spacey Jane

from the album If That Makes Sense
- Released: 9 May 2025
- Length: 2:58
- Label: AWAL
- Songwriters: Caleb Harper; Ashton Hardman-Le Cornu; Kieran Lama; Peppa Lane; Sarah Aarons
- Producer: Mike Crossey

Spacey Jane singles chronology
"Through My Teeth" (2025)	"Whateverrrr" (2025)	"Do You Really Love Her" (2026)

"Whateverrrr" is a song by Australian indie rock band Spacey Jane, released on 9 May 2025 as the fourth single to their third studio album, If That Makes Sense.

"Whateverrrr" was voted in at number 6 on the 2025 Triple J Hottest 100.

In 2025, the song was certified gold by the Australian Recording Industry Association for streams and sales equaling 35,000 units.

== Reception ==
In an album review Jonah Taylor from The Live Wire said "'Whateverrrr' is a gorgeous moment of emotional contradiction—equal parts childhood memory and melancholic acceptance."

In an album review Sarah Space from Melodic Mag named "Whateverrrr" as one of three recommended tracks and called it "a bittersweet ode to past adolescence, with layered vocals and impressive chords that transport you back to the days of lawn sprinklers and sweltering summer afternoons."

== Charts ==
Chart performance for "Whateverrrr"
Chart (2025–2026)	Peak position
Australia (ARIA)	76

== Certifications ==
Certifications for "Whateverrrr"
Region	Certification	Certified units/sales
Australia (ARIA)	Gold	35,000^{‡}
^{‡} Sales+streaming figures based on certification alone.
