= Exit Wounds (EP) =

EP by Spacey Jane
- Released: 12 June 2026
- Length: 20:35
- Labels: AWAL; Concord
- Producers: Day Wave (Note: Tracks 1–5); John Hill (Note: Track 6)

Spacey Jane chronology
If That Makes Sense (2025)	Exit Wounds (2026)

Singles from Exit Wounds
- 1. "Do You Really Love Her" Released: 13 March 2026; 2. "I Never See Her" Released: 15 May 2026; 3. "East Village" Released: 12 June 2026

Exit Wounds is the third extended play (EP) by Australian indie rock band Spacey Jane, released digitally by AWAL and Concord on 12 June 2026. A physical release is scheduled for 13 November 2026.

Produced by Day Wave and John Hill, Exit Wounds was written and recorded during the same studio sessions as their third studio album, If That Makes Sense (2025). The EP was preceded by two singles: "Do You Really Love Her" and "I Never See Her".

Exit Wounds debuted and peaked at number 43 on the ARIA Albums Chart following its release.

== Background and release ==
Exit Wounds follows on from Spacey Jane's third studio album, If That Makes Sense (2025), and subsequent sold-out headline tours in Australia, New Zealand, North America, the UK, and Europe, and a performance at Governors Ball Music Festival in New York City, New York.

The title and cover artwork were revealed on 15 May 2026, alongside the announcement of an Australian tour that November. Exit Wounds was released by AWAL and Concord Records on 12 June 2026. The EP was described by a number of media outlets as being "highly anticipated".

== Recording and composition ==
Exit Wounds was largely recorded in Los Angeles, California by Day Wave, during the same recording session as their third studio album, If That Makes Sense (2025). The record was mixed by American mixing engineer Lars Stalfors. The band believed that each of the songs didn't feel right to include on the album and as such they were omitted.

"Do You Really Love Her" was written on Mulholland Drive alongside Sarah Aarons and Joel Little. The band referenced 80s pub rock bands, including INXS and Icehouse, to create an "expansive" and "dramatic" sound. Its lyrics, "part fiction, part reality", envisage frontman Caleb Harper being stood up, only to see his date on a movie screen. "I Never See Her" combines somber vocals and lyrics about an imminent breakup with an upbeat melody including "twanging guitar and thumping percussion". The song was initially written in a tempo of 60 beats per minute (BPM) slower.

== Promotion ==
=== Singles ===
Exit Wounds was preceded by two singles: "Do You Really Love Her", released on 13 March 2026, and "I Never See Her", released on 15 May 2026. "East Village" was serviced to radio concurrently with the EP's release on 12 June 2026 as the third and final single.

=== Tour ===
In November 2026, the band will embark on their Heading Back Down Under Tour, a 9-date Australian headline concert tour, commencing on 26 November and concluding on 13 December. They will be supported across all shows by Melbourne bands Telenova and Armlock.

== Commercial performance ==
In Australia, Exit Wounds debuted and peaked at number 43 on the ARIA Albums Chart on the chart dated 22 June 2026. In New Zealand, the EP failed to chart on the Top 40 Albums Chart, but the single "East Village" debuted at number 19 on the Top 40 Hot Singles Chart.

== Track listing ==
All tracks are written by Caleb Harper, Ashton Hardman-Le Cornu, Peppa Lane, and Kieran Lama, except where noted. All tracks are produced by Day Wave, except where noted.

Exit Wounds track listing
No.	Title	Writer(s)	Producer(s)	Length
1.	"I Never See Her"			3:04
2.	"Watch Me Break the News"			3:34
3.	"It's Not Lost on Me"			3:15
4.	"East Village"			3:31
5.	"Sleeping Pills"	Harper; Hardman-Le Cornu; Lane; Lama; Konrad Snyder; Henry Brill		3:21
6.	"Do You Really Love Her"	Harper; Hardman-Le Cornu; Lane; Lama; Sarah Aarons; Joel Little	John Hill	3:48
Total length:				20:35

== Personnel ==
Spacey Jane:

- Caleb Harper – vocals, rhythm guitar, writing (all tracks)
- Ashton Hardman-Le Cornu – guitar, writing (all tracks)
- Peppa Lane – bass, writing (all tracks)
- Kieran Lama – drums, writing (all tracks)

=== Other musicians ===
- Day Wave – production (1–5)
- John Hill – production (6)
- Sarah Aarons – writing (6)
- Joel Little – writing (6)
- Lars Stalfors – mixing (all tracks)

== Charts ==
Chart performance for Exit Wounds
Chart (2026)	Peak position
Australian Albums (ARIA)	43
Scottish Albums (Official Charts)	83
