= The Olms =

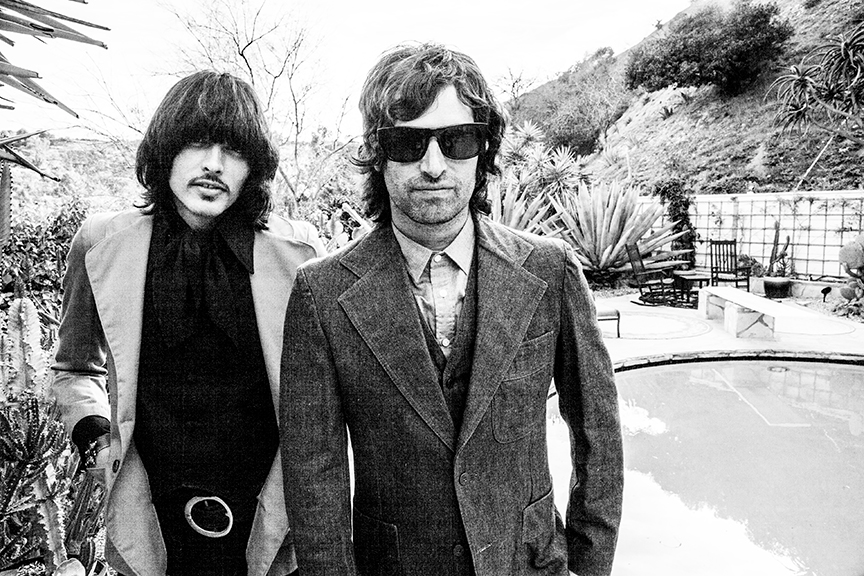

Background information
- Genres: Indie pop, folk rock
- Years active: 2011– present
- Labels: Harvest Records
- Members: Pete Yorn; J.D. King
- Website: http://www.theolmsmusic.com/

The Olms is a two-member musical group made up of singer-songwriter Pete Yorn and J.D. King. Their debut self-titled album debuted at #4 on Billboard's Top Heatseekers chart.

== History ==
Yorn and King originally met through Linda Ramone, a mutual friend and widow of Johnny Ramone. The two later toured together and then decided to perform a song together after Yorn listened to some of the songs that King had written and the two bounced song ideas off one another. In 2011, they created their first track together in 20 minutes, which later became the single "Twice As Nice", included on their debut album.

The band's first album was released on June 4, 2013, with the official single being "Wanna Feel It". The self-titled album was recorded in King's studio with both artists credited for playing almost all of the instruments on each track. The album was an Editor's Pick on iTunes the week following its release and the song "Someone Else's Girl" was a Top Tune by KCRW on June 28, 2013. The album has been compared to "easygoing country rock and simple '60s pop" and Allmusic stated that the single "Someone Else's Girl" would have been a hit single in 1966. The album also peaked at #4 on Billboard's Top Heatseekers.

In 2013, Yorn revealed to Rolling Stone and Elle that a second album was already halfway completed.

On September 15, 2013, The Olms performed along with Vampire Weekend at the iTunes Festival in London. An EP of the performance was released in conjunction with a documentary centering on their first tour on November 12, 2013.

== Discography ==
Year	Album
2013	The Olms
