= Break Up (album) =

Studio album by Pete Yorn and Scarlett Johansson
- Released: September 15, 2009
- Recorded: 2006–2009
- Genres: Indie folk; alternative rock
- Length: 28:55
- Labels: Atco; Rhino
- Producer: Sunny Levine

Scarlett Johansson chronology
Anywhere I Lay My Head (2008)	Break Up (2009)

Pete Yorn chronology
Back and Fourth (2009)	Break Up (2009)	Pete Yorn (2010)

Singles from Anywhere I Lay My Head
- 1. "Relator" Released: June 29, 2009; 2. "Blackie's Dead" Released: August 28, 2009

Break Up is a collaborative album by Pete Yorn and Scarlett Johansson. Its first single, "Relator" was released as a digital download on May 25, 2009. The full album was released by Atco and Rhino on September 15, 2009. It was certified gold in France.

== Production ==
The album was recorded in 2006, thus preceding several albums that Yorn and Johansson have released as solo artists. Johansson completed her vocals for the project in two afternoon sessions.

Yorn said that the concept for the album was realized in a dream he had. The project was inspired by Serge Gainsbourg's 1967 and 1968 albums with Brigitte Bardot.

Johansson spoke about the project at the time of the "Relator" single release; "The idea of two people vocalizing their relationship through duets...I always thought of it as just a small project between friends. It perfectly captured where I was in my life at the time".

== Promotion ==
During 2009, Yorn stated that he would like to do some live shows with Johansson to promote the album. By September 10 that year, Johansson and Yorn performed "Relator" on the French television show Le Grand Journal. It was Johansson's first live performance on television.

The duo were then interviewed by KCRW on October 7; they talked about past, present and future projects, and performed the single "Relator" along with "Blackie's Dead", "Search Your Heart", "Shampoo" and a cover of the Kinks' "Stop Your Sobbing". They also stated that they would like to tour, but because the short time the songs give them to perform (around 29 minutes), they would like to turn the concert into a dinner if there's the demand for them to tour.

== Reception ==
Professional ratings
Review scores
Source	Rating
The A.V. Club	C+
AllMusic	3/5 stars
BBC	(average)
Chart Attack	2.5/5 stars
Entertainment Weekly	B−
The Independent	(positive)
Now Magazine	3/5 stars
Paste	(positive)
Pitchfork	4.7/10
Rolling Stone	2.5/5 stars

The album was rated a 52/100 among professional music critics on Metacritic, indicating mixed or average reviews.

== Track listing ==
=== Standard edition ===
All tracks are written by Pete Yorn, except where noted.

No.	Title	Writer(s)	Length
1.	"Relator"		2:33
2.	"Wear and Tear"		3:22
3.	"I Don't Know What to Do"		3:29
4.	"Search Your Heart"		3:01
5.	"Blackie's Dead"		2:37
6.	"I Am the Cosmos"	Chris Bell	2:47
7.	"Shampoo"		3:05
8.	"Clean"		3:48
9.	"Someday"		4:17

Amazon exclusive bonus tracks
No.	Title	Length
10.	"Blackie's Dead [Demo]"	2:03

=== French special edition ===
CD 2 includes live versions recorded at The Village Recorder in Los Angeles on October 7, 2009. Originally broadcast on KCRW's Morning Becomes Eclectic with Jason Bentley. This CD was launched like the "Live At KCRW.Com EP" on Amazon.com, and after included in "Break Up (Deluxe Edition)".

This enhanced CD also includes Relator video.

No.	Title	Writer(s)	Length
1.	"Relator"		2:36
2.	"Blackie's Dead"		2:38
3.	"I Don't Know What to Do"		3:30
4.	"Search Your Heart"		3:03
5.	"Shampoo"		3:08
6.	"Stop Your Sobbin'"	Ray Davies	2:38
7.	"Relator" (video)		2:33

== Personnel ==
- Robert Francis – banjo, bass guitar, electric guitar, pedal steel guitar, slide guitar
- Max Goldblatt – banjo, synthesizer bass, background vocals
- Scarlett Johansson – lead vocals, background vocals
- Sunny D. Levine – programming, synthesizer bass
- Giuseppe Patanè – bass guitar
- Amir Yaghmai – synthesizer strings, synthesizer
- Pete Yorn – banjo, acoustic guitar, electric guitar, piano, tambourine, lead vocals, background vocals

== Chart positions ==
Album

Chart (2009)	Peak position
Belgian Albums (Ultratop Flanders)	78
Belgian Albums (Ultratop Wallonia)	45
French Albums (SNEP)	18
German Albums (Offizielle Top 100)	89
Swiss Albums (Schweizer Hitparade)	58
UK Albums Chart	160
US Billboard 200	41
US Top Alternative Albums (Billboard)	6
US Top Rock Albums (Billboard)	14

Singles

Year	Single	Chart	Peak Position
2009	"Relator"	Belgian Singles Chart (Wallonia)	10
2009	"Relator"	German Singles Chart	91
2009	"Relator"	Swiss Singles Chart	57
2009	"Relator"	UK Singles Chart	189

== Certifications ==
Region	Certification	Certified units/sales
France (SNEP)	Gold	50,000^{*}
^{*} Sales figures based on certification alone.
