= Nightcrawler (album) =

Studio album by Pete Yorn
- Released: August 29, 2006
- Studio: 41 Market St. (Venice, CA); Red Swan Studios (Los Angeles, CA); Zeitgeist Studios (Los Angeles, CA)
- Genre: Rock
- Length: 51:30
- Label: Red Ink; Columbia
- Producer: Butch Walker; Evan Frankfort; Ken Andrews; Michael Beinhorn; Pete Yorn; Tony Berg

Pete Yorn chronology
Day I Forgot (2003)	Nightcrawler (2006)	Back & Fourth (2009)

Singles from Nightcrawler
- 1. "For Us" Released: 2006; 2. "Alive" Released: 2007

Nightcrawler is the third full-length studio album by American musician Pete Yorn and released on August 29, 2006, via Red Ink/Columbia Records. Production was handled by Michael Beinhorn, Tony Berg, Butch Walker, Evan Frankfort and Yorn himself with Dave Grohl, Rami Jaffe, and The Chicks' Natalie Maines and Martie Maguire among the guest contributors. In addition, the album also features the Ken Andrews produced "Undercover" from the Spider-Man soundtrack.

In the United States, it peaked at number 50 on the Billboard 200 and number 17 on the Top Rock & Alternative Albums charts.

== Critical reception ==
Professional ratings
Aggregate scores
Source	Rating
Metacritic	67/100
Review scores
Source	Rating
AllMusic	3.5/5 stars
Blender	3.5/5 stars
Cokemachineglow	68/100%
IGN	7.3/10
PopMatters	7/10
Prefix	5/10
Slant	3/5 stars
Spin	3.5/5 stars
Sputnikmusic	4/5
The A.V. Club	B

Nightcrawler was met with generally favorable reviews from music critics. At Metacritic, which assigns a normalized rating out of 100 to reviews from mainstream publications, the album received an average score of 67 based on sixteen reviews.

Paste magazine ranked the album at No. 16 on their 'Top 100 Albums of 2006' list.

== Track listing ==
No.	Title	Producer(s)	Length
1.	"Vampyre"	Michael Beinhorn; Pete Yorn	3:08
2.	"For Us"	Michael Beinhorn; Pete Yorn	3:32
3.	"Undercover"	Ken Andrews	3:55
4.	"Policies"	Tony Berg	3:40
5.	"The Man"	Michael Beinhorn; Pete Yorn	3:24
6.	"Maybe I'm Right"	Michael Beinhorn; Pete Yorn	3:39
7.	"Same Thing"	Michael Beinhorn; Pete Yorn	3:45
8.	"Alive"	Butch Walker; Pete Yorn	3:46
9.	"Splendid Isolation"	Evan Frankfort; Pete Yorn	3:46
10.	"Broken Bottle"	Michael Beinhorn; Pete Yorn	3:40
11.	"How Do You Go On?"	Tony Berg	3:35
12.	"Ice Age"	Michael Beinhorn; Pete Yorn	5:13
13.	"Georgie Boy"	Tony Berg	3:18
14.	"Bandstand in the Sky"	Tony Berg	3:09
Total length:			51:30

== Personnel ==
- Peter Joseph "Pete" Yorn – vocals, acoustic guitar, baritone guitar, electric guitar, bass, organ, drums, percussion, drum machine, harmonica, mandolin, producer (tracks: 1, 2, 5–10, 12), programming
- Michael Beinhorn – mini-moog, synthesizer & electronic drums (tracks: 1, 2, 5, 7, 12), producer (tracks: 1, 2, 5–7, 10, 12)
- Tim Walker – electric guitar (tracks: 2, 6, 9, 12)
- Zach Shaeffer – piano, bass & mandolin (tracks: 2, 5, 12)
- Rami Jaffee – organ (tracks: 2, 5)
- Dave Grohl – drums (track 2)
- Ken Andrews – electric guitar, bass guitar, synthesizer, producer & programming (track 3)
- Tim Dow – drums (track 3)
- Anthony Rains "Tony" Berg – electric guitar (tracks: 4, 14), horns (track 4), organ (track 13), producer (tracks: 4, 11, 13, 14)
- Natalie Maines – backing vocals (track 5)
- Joe Kennedy – piano (tracks: 5, 6, 9, 12)
- Farmer Dave Scher – steel guitar & melodica (tracks: 5, 9, 12)
- Martie Maguire – fiddle (track 5)
- Sid Jordan – bass (tracks: 6, 7)
- Bradley Glenn "Butch" Walker – piano, synth, bass, producer & percussion (track 8)
- Michael Guy Chislett – electric guitar (track 8)
- Darren Dodd – drums (track 8)
- Evan Frankfort – electric guitar, piano & producer (track 9)
- Marc Dauer – electric guitar (track 10)
- Shawn Everett – saxophone (track 13), programming, recording & mixing (tracks: 4, 5, 11, 13, 14)
- Nick Page – engineering (tracks: 1, 2, 5–7, 10, 12)
- Karl Egsieker – engineering (track 8)
- Stephen Marcussen – mastering

== Charts ==
Chart (2006)	Peak position
US Billboard 200	50
US Top Rock Albums (Billboard)	17
