= J. D. King (musician) =

J.D. King
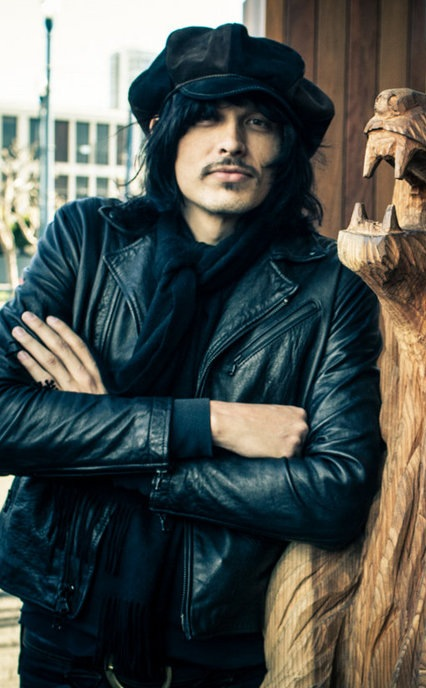

Background information
- Born: Jordon Matthew Davis; February 5, 1984 (age 42); Corona, California, U.S.
- Label: Harvest
- Website: jdkingmusic.com

J.D. King is an American singer, songwriter, engineer, photographer producer, multi-instrumentalist and a founding member of the group The Olms.

== Early life ==
King grew up in Orange County. He knew from an early age that he wanted to be a musician. He had taken piano lessons for years, but when he was 10 his father brought home a record player and a box of albums by the Beatles and Elvis he listened to them over and over. King then taught himself various instruments and began writing songs.

In high school and college, King studied photography, not expecting to have a music career. He built his own dark room and believed that photography was going to be his career until he began to play keyboard again at the age of 18 and decided to go back to music.

== Career ==
King released his first album in 2008. Entitled Here's J.D. King, he performed vocals as well as acoustic guitar, harmonica, and flute on the album.

King collaborated with Pete Yorn in 2013 to release the self-titled album for their group The Olms. Both had been friends for almost a decade prior to sitting down in 2011 and writing a song together. The song, Twice as Nice, was written in 20 minutes by the duo and is also a single on their 2013 album.

== Discography ==
=== Solo releases ===
Year	Album	US	FR	CH	RIAA Certification
2008	Here's J.D. King	–	–	–	–

=== Group releases ===
Year	Album	US	FR	CH	RIAA Certification
2013	The Olms	–	–	–	–
