= Back and Fourth (Pete Yorn album) =

Back & Fourth

Studio album by Pete Yorn
- Released: June 23, 2009
- Recorded: 2006–2009
- Studio: ARC Studios (Omaha, NE)
- Genre: Alternative rock
- Length: 42:53
- Label: Columbia
- Producer: Mike Mogis

Pete Yorn chronology
Nightcrawler (2006)	Back & Fourth (2009)	Break Up (2009)

Singles from Back & Fourth
- 1. "Don't Wanna Cry" Released: March 24, 2009

Professional ratings
Aggregate scores
Source	Rating
Metacritic	67/100
Review scores
Source	Rating
AllMusic	3/5 stars
American Songwriter	3/5 stars
Billboard	3/5 stars
Consequence of Sound	B−
musicOMH	3.5/5 stars
PopMatters	5/10
Slant	3/5 stars
Spin	4/10
Sputnikmusic	3.5/5
The A.V. Club	C

Back & Fourth is the fourth solo full-length studio album by American musician Pete Yorn. It was released on June 23, 2009, via Columbia Records. Recording sessions took place at ARC Studios in Omaha, Nebraska. Production was handled by Mike Mogis, with Rick Rubin serving as executive producer. The album peaked at number 32 on the Billboard 200 and number 14 on the Top Rock Albums charts in the United States.

== Track listing ==
All tracks are written by Peter Joseph Yorn.

No.	Title	Length
1.	"Don't Wanna Cry"	3:56
2.	"Paradise Cove"	3:57
3.	"Close"	4:23
4.	"Social Development Dance"	4:55
5.	"Shotgun"	4:01
6.	"Last Summer"	4:53
7.	"Thinking of You"	3:42
8.	"Country"	5:05
9.	"Four Years"	3:46
10.	"Long Time Nothing New"	4:15
Total length:		42:53

Expanded version
No.	Title	Length
11.	"Rooftop"
12.	"Welcome"
13.	"Close"
14.	"Don't Wanna Cry"
15.	"Shotgun"

== Personnel ==
- Pete Yorn – lyrics, vocals, acoustic guitar (tracks: 1–8, 10), percussion (track: 2, 4, 5, 8), electric guitar (tracks: 4, 5)
- Orenda Fink – backing vocals (tracks: 1–7, 9, 10)
- Jonny Polonsky – nylon strings guitar (tracks: 1, 4, 7, 9), electric guitar (tracks: 2, 5, 10), acoustic guitar (track 2), 12-string electric guitar (tracks: 3, 6, 8), bajo sexto (track 5)
- Ben Brodin – Hammond S-112 organ (tracks: 1, 2, 5, 7, 8), bowed vibraphone (tracks: 1, 5, 10), Wurlitzer electric piano (track 1), vibraphone (track 2), piano (track 6), pump organ (track 7)
- Joseph Karnes – upright bass (tracks: 1–3, 5, 7–10), electric bass (tracks: 5–7)
- Joey Waronker – drums, percussion (tracks: 2, 4–7)
- Mike Mogis – percussion, electric guitar (tracks: 2–10), mandolin (tracks: 1, 7, 8, 10), Wurlitzer electric piano (tracks: 3, 6), bowed vibraphone (track 3), baritone guitar (tracks: 4, 10), hammered dulcimer (track 5), EBow guitar (tracks: 9, 10), strings arrangement, producer, engineering, mixing
- Jay Wise – trombone (tracks: 1, 3–5, 7, 9)
- Jason DeWater – french horn (tracks: 1, 3, 4, 7)
- Scott Quackenbush – trumpet (tracks: 1, 3, 9)
- Craig Fuller – tuba (track 1)
- Nate Walcott – piano (tracks: 2, 5, 8–10), B-3 organ (tracks: 3, 4), strings arrangement, horns arrangement
- Anton Patzner – violin (tracks: 3, 5, 7, 9), strings arrangement
- Lewis Patzner – cello (tracks: 3, 5, 7, 9), strings arrangement
- R. Walt Vincent – Wurlitzer electric piano & synth bass (track 4)
- Scott Gaeta – drums (tracks: 4, 5), assistant engineering
- Leslie Fagan – flute (track 4)
- Darrin Pettit – baritone and tenor saxophone (tracks: 5, 9)
- Tom Hartig – tenor saxophone (track 5)
- A. J. Mogis – assistant engineering
- Shawn Everett – assistant engineering
- Steve Barthalome – assistant engineering
- Vlado Meller – mastering
- Rick Rubin – executive producer
- Kii Arens – art direction, photography
- Autumn de Wilde – photography
- Stephen Albanese – photography
- Maureen Kenny – A&R

== Charts ==
Chart (2009)	Peak position
US Billboard 200	32
US Top Rock Albums (Billboard)	14
