= Anywhere I Lay My Head =

Studio album by Scarlett Johansson
- Released: May 16, 2008
- Recorded: 2007
- Studio: Dockside (Maurice, Louisiana)
- Genre: Indie folk; alternative rock; dream pop
- Length: 44:23
- Label: Atco
- Producer: David Andrew Sitek

Scarlett Johansson chronology
Anywhere I Lay My Head (2008)	Break Up (2009)

Singles from Anywhere I Lay My Head
- 1. "Falling Down" Released: March 18, 2008

Anywhere I Lay My Head is the debut studio album by American actress and singer Scarlett Johansson, released on May 16, 2008, by Atco Records. She recorded it over five weeks in spring 2007 at Dockside Studios in Maurice, Louisiana. It was produced by Dave Sitek of TV on the Radio and includes collaborations with David Bowie and members of Yeah Yeah Yeahs and Celebration.

It contains four songs by Tom Waits, six songs by Waits and his wife Kathleen Brennan, and one original composition, "Song for Jo". The album received mixed reviews, and saw moderate commercial success. "Falling Down" was released as its lead single.

== Critical reception ==
Professional ratings
Aggregate scores
Source	Rating
Metacritic	58/100
Review scores
Source	Rating
AllMusic	2.5/5 stars
Drowned in Sound	6/10
Entertainment Weekly	C
The Guardian	4/5 stars
NME	8/10
The Observer	4/5 stars
Pitchfork	5.5/10
Rolling Stone	2.5/5 stars
Slant Magazine	2.5/5 stars
Spin	5/10

Anywhere I Lay My Head received mixed reviews from music critics. At Metacritic, which assigns a weighted mean rating out of 100 to reviews from mainstream critics, the album received an average score of 58, based on 35 reviews, indicating "mixed or average reviews". Priya Elan of the NME called the album "brilliant" and wrote that "just like Lou Reed with Nico and Serge Gainsbourg with Brigitte Bardot, Sitek has effortlessly translated Johansson's magnetism on to record", while comparing her "deep" voice to "latter-day Ronnie Spector's street-savvy tone". The Observer's Barney Hoskyns commented that Johansson's "blankly androgynous alto timbre is nothing special, but that barely matters", praising the album as "a bravely eccentric selection and a captivating homage to a singular writer". The Guardian's Dorian Lynskey described Johansson's voice as "a supple, languid instrument offering hints of Nico, Kim Deal and Martina Topley-Bird" and stated, "You might wish there was more from Waits' 70s barfly period [...] but it's a measure of this album's surprising allure that you're left wanting more."

AllMusic reviewer Stephen Thomas Erlewine found Johansson to be "surprisingly deep and brittle as a singer", concluding that the album "doesn't quite work, but it can't quite be dismissed, either: unlike so many actor-turned-singer records, there's not a hint of vanity to this project and it's hard not to marvel at its ambition even as it fails." Mikael Wood of Spin wrote, "Beyond the fact that her voice is deep enough for her to front Crash Test Dummies, there's nothing particularly compelling about Scarlett Johansson's singing", adding that "her vocals are buried deep beneath [...] Dave Sitek's mountain of reverbed space-gospel noise." Nevertheless, Wood opined the album is "[n]ot your typical Hollywood vanity project". Chris Willman of Entertainment Weekly remarked, "In burying Johansson's vocals so deeply in the druggy ambiance, producer David Andrew Sitek [...] means well but ends up obscuring Waits' great tunes."

Stephen M. Deusner of Pitchfork viewed the album as "a Brooklyn update on vintage 4AD bands like This Mortal Coil or Cocteau Twins", but noted that "[t]he only thing we've learned about her is that she really, really likes Tom Waits. That's more than enough to avoid catastrophe, but not quite enough to make Anywhere I Lay My Head much more than a curio." Rolling Stone's Will Hermes critiqued that "Johansson's voice is unremarkable and her pitch sometimes unsteady", dubbing her "a faintly goth Marilyn Monroe lost in a sonic fog". Dave Hughes of Slant Magazine expressed that Johansson is "neither a particularly interesting nor a particularly skillful singer, and she spends much of the record locked into a sub-Nico hum that's quite a bit less charismatic than her husky line readings might suggest." Alex Denney of Drowned in Sound concluded, "Perversely given the record's comprehensive musical overhaul it's perhaps a surfeit of respect for the source material that proves Anywhere...'s undoing; for all its undoubted accomplishments there's a lingering suspicion that this is too safe, too respectable a record to do justice to an artist who remains forever mid-topple from the bar stool in the popular consciousness."

== Commercial performance ==
Anywhere I Lay My Head debuted at number 126 on the Billboard 200, selling 5,100 copies in its first week. The album fared better in Europe, reaching number 15 in Switzerland, number 25 in Austria, number 26 in France, number 27 in Sweden, and number 30 in Belgium and Germany. By August 2009, the album had sold about 25,000 copies worldwide.

== Track listing ==
No.	Title	Writer(s)	Length
1.	"Fawn" (from Alice)	Tom Waits; Kathleen Brennan	2:32
2.	"Town with No Cheer" (from Swordfishtrombones)	Waits	5:03
3.	"Falling Down" (from Big Time)	Waits	4:55
4.	"Anywhere I Lay My Head" (from Rain Dogs)	Waits	3:38
5.	"Fannin Street" (from Orphans: Brawlers, Bawlers & Bastards)	Waits; Brennan	5:06
6.	"Song for Jo"	Scarlett Johansson; David Andrew Sitek	4:09
7.	"Green Grass" (from Real Gone)	Waits; Brennan	3:33
8.	"I Wish I Was in New Orleans" (from Small Change)	Waits	3:59
9.	"I Don't Wanna Grow Up" (from Bone Machine)	Waits; Brennan	4:11
10.	"No One Knows I'm Gone" (from Alice)	Waits; Brennan	2:57
11.	"Who Are You" (from Bone Machine)	Waits; Brennan	4:20

iTunes Store deluxe edition bonus tracks
No.	Title	Writer(s)	Length
12.	"Yesterday Is Here" (from Franks Wild Years)	Waits; Brennan	2:44
13.	"I'll Shoot the Moon" (from The Black Rider)	Waits	4:11
14.	"Falling Down" (video)		3:58

Japanese edition bonus track
No.	Title	Writer(s)	Length
12.	"Yesterday Is Here" (from Franks Wild Years)	Waits; Brennan	2:44

== Personnel ==
Credits adapted from the liner notes of Anywhere I Lay My Head.

- Scarlett Johansson – vocals (tracks 2–11)
- Tunde Adebimpe – loops, vocals (track 6)
- Kris Ahrend – project assistance
- Sean Antanaitis – wind chimes (track 1); organ (tracks 1, 2, 11); tambourine, jingle bells (tracks 1–3, 5); bass pedals, bowls (track 2); pump organ (tracks 2–4); synthesizer (tracks 2–5, 7, 9, 10); vibes (tracks 2, 3, 7); electric piano (tracks 2, 11); piano (tracks 3, 5, 11); banjo (tracks 3, 7); guitorgan (tracks 3, 7, 11); guitar (tracks 5, 7); acoustic guitar, kalimba (track 7); music box (track 8)
- Dave Bergander – Nigerian logs (track 11)
- Stuart Bogie – saxophone (tracks 1, 2, 4); bass harmonica (tracks 2, 4)
- David Bowie – vocals (tracks 3, 5)
- Jaleel Bunton – bass (tracks 1, 9, 11); synthesizer (track 2); acoustic guitar (tracks 3–5); electric piano (tracks 4, 10); slide guitar (track 7)
- Greg Calbi – mastering
- Lellie Capwell – project assistance
- Steve Fallone – mastering assistance
- Sheryl Farber – project assistance
- David Farrell – engineering assistance (all tracks); tambourine, triangle (track 1)
- Robin Hurley – project supervision
- Rick Kwan – engineering assistance
- Maria McKenna – project assistance
- Paul McMenamin – design
- Chris Moore – mixing, recording (all tracks); synthesizer (track 10)
- Sara Newkirk – management
- Martin Perna – saxophone (tracks 1, 2, 4); flute (tracks 6, 10)
- Korey Richey – engineering assistance (all tracks); jingle bells, tambourine (track 1); Tibetan bowls (track 2); acoustic guitar, guitar, rainstick, vocals, piano (track 6)
- Ryan Sawyer – drums (tracks 1–3, 7); dog bowl (track 2); Tibetan bowls (tracks 2, 10); bowed vibes (track 3); tambourine (tracks 3, 11); bowed cymbal (track 4); toms (track 5); jingle bells (tracks 7, 10); bells, snare drum (track 10); Nigerian logs (track 11)
- Liuba Shapiro – product management
- David Andrew Sitek – mixing, recording, production (all tracks); guitar (tracks 2–6, 9–11); sampler (tracks 2–5, 7, 9–11); drum machine (tracks 4, 9, 11); synthesizer (tracks 5, 11); drums, acoustic guitar (track 6); kalimba (track 7); vocals (track 11); photography
- Brea Souders – diorama creation, photography
- Colin Suzuki – engineering assistance
- Ivo Watts-Russell – sequencing
- Brett Westfall – illustration
- Steve Woolard – project assistance
- Nick Zinner – guitar (tracks 1, 2, 4, 5, 9, 11); slide guitar (track 3)

== Charts ==
=== Album ===
Chart (2008)	Peak position
Australian Hitseekers Albums (ARIA)	9
Austrian Albums (Ö3 Austria)	25
Belgian Albums (Ultratop Flanders)	30
Belgian Albums (Ultratop Wallonia)	45
European Albums (Billboard)	27
French Albums (SNEP)	26
German Albums (Offizielle Top 100)	30
Irish Albums (IRMA)	65
Scottish Albums (OCC)	71
Spanish Albums (PROMUSICAE)	77
Swedish Albums (Sverigetopplistan)	27
Swiss Albums (Schweizer Hitparade)	15
UK Albums (OCC)	64
US Billboard 200	126

=== Singles ===
Title	Year	Peak chart positions	
Title	Year	BEL TIP (FL)	SWI
"Falling Down"	2008	23	70

== Release history ==
Region	Date	Label	Ref.
Germany	May 16, 2008	Warner	
France	May 19, 2008	Warner	
United Kingdom	May 19, 2008	Rhino	
United States	May 20, 2008	Atco	
Sweden	May 21, 2008	Warner	
Australia	May 23, 2008	Warner	
Japan	June 25, 2008	Warner	
