= Day I Forgot =

Studio album by Pete Yorn
- Released: April 15, 2003
- Studio: Mesmer Proper Studios (Culver City, CA)
- Genre: Rock
- Length: 52:15
- Label: Columbia
- Producer: Ken Andrews; Pete Yorn; R. Walt Vincent; Scott Litt

Pete Yorn chronology
Musicforthemorningafter (2001)	Day I Forgot (2003)	Nightcrawler (2006)

Singles from Day I Forgot
- 1. "Come Back Home" Released: 2003; 2. "Crystal Village" Released: 2003

Professional ratings
Aggregate scores
Source	Rating
Metacritic	58/100
Review scores
Source	Rating
AllMusic	3/5 stars
Blender	3.5/5 stars
Cokemachineglow	50%
E!	C
Entertainment Weekly	B−
The Guardian	3/5 stars
Now	2/5 stars
Q	4/5 stars
Rolling Stone	2/5 stars
Uncut	4/10

Day I Forgot is the second studio album by American musician Pete Yorn. It was released on April 15, 2003 via Columbia Records. Recording sessions took place at Mesmer Proper Studios in Culver City. Production was handled by R. Walt Vincent, Scott Litt, Ken Andrews and Pete Yorn himself, with Brad Wood serving as additional producer. The album peaked at number 18 on the US Billboard 200 and number 48 on the Official Scottish Albums Chart Top 100 albums charts. It spawned two singles: "Come Back Home" and "Crystal Village".

== Track listing ==
All tracks are written by Peter Joseph Yorn.

No.	Title	Producer(s)	Length
1.	"Intro"	Pete Yorn; R. Walt Vincent	0:47
2.	"Come Back Home"	Pete Yorn; R. Walt Vincent	3:24
3.	"Crystal Village"	Pete Yorn; R. Walt Vincent; Scott Litt	3:46
4.	"Carlos (Don't Let It Go to Your Head)"	Pete Yorn; R. Walt Vincent; Scott Litt	3:29
5.	"Pass Me By"	Ken Andrews	3:51
6.	"Committed"	Pete Yorn; R. Walt Vincent; Brad Wood (add.)	3:29
7.	"Long Way Down"	Ken Andrews	3:38
8.	"When You See the Light"	Scott Litt	2:43
9.	"Turn of the Century"	Ken Andrews	3:03
10.	"Burrito"	Pete Yorn; R. Walt Vincent	2:45
11.	"Man in Uniform"	Pete Yorn; R. Walt Vincent	2:41
12.	"All at Once"	Pete Yorn; R. Walt Vincent; Scott Litt	4:04
13.	Untitled		0:04
14.	"So Much Work"	Pete Yorn; R. Walt Vincent	4:47
15.	"The Making of Day I Forgot" (Video)		8:32
Total length:			52:15

Japanese edition bonus tracks
No.	Title	Length
15.	"Drive Away"	2:00
16.	"Seventeen"	3:38
17.	"Suspicious Minds"	3:41

Notes

- Track 13 doesn't appear in tracklisting.

== Personnel ==
- Pete Yorn – lyrics, vocals, acoustic guitar, electric guitar, baritone guitar, Rhodes electric piano, bass, drums, percussion, hand played snare drum, producer
- Ken Andrews – backing vocals, electric guitar, bass guitar, synthesizer, programming, producer, recording, mixing
- Brad Wood – backing vocals, electric guitar, percussion, additional programming, additional producer
- R. Walt Vincent – guitar, electric guitar, organ, Prophet V synthesizer, String Machine synthesizer, piano, Wurlitzer electric piano, Rhodes electric piano, bass, harmonica, beatbox, melodica, mellotron, xylophone, producer, recording, mixing
- Jeff Garber – slide guitar
- Charlotte Martin – piano
- Justin Meldal-Johnsen – upright bass
- Josh Freese – drums
- Tim Dow – drums
- Scott Litt – cowbell, glockenspiel, producer, mixing
- Peter Buck – mandolin
- Andy Wallace – mixing (tracks: 2, 5–7, 10, 11, 14)
- Josh Turner – additional engineering
- Stephen Marcussen – mastering
- Brandy Flower – art direction
- Jim Wright – photography
- Luke Adams – photography
- Tim Devine – A&R

== Charts ==
Chart performance
Chart (2003)	Peak position
Australian Hitseekers Albums (ARIA)	15
Canadian Albums (Nielsen SoundScan)	48
Scottish Albums (Official Charts)	81
UK Albums (Official Charts)	115
US Billboard 200	18
