= Pete Yorn =

American musician (born 1974)

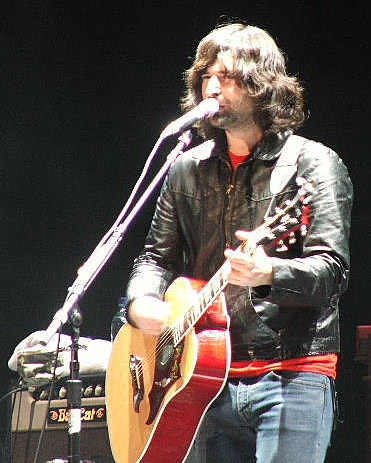
- Yorn in 2006

Background information
- Born: Peter Joseph Yorn; July 27, 1974 (age 52); Pompton Plains, New Jersey, U.S.
- Genres: Alternative rock; indie rock; indie folk
- Occupation: Singer-songwriter
- Instruments: Vocals; guitar; harmonica; drums; bass; piano; analog synthesizer
- Years active: 1990–present
- Labels: Shelly; Capitol; Columbia; Rhino; Vagrant; Warner Brothers (France); Trampoline
- Member of: The Olms
- Website: www.peteyorn.com

Peter Joseph Yorn (born July 27, 1974) is an American singer, songwriter, and musician. He first gained international recognition after his debut record, Musicforthemorningafter, was released to critical and commercial acclaim in 2001. He is known for playing the bulk of the instruments on his records. Spin magazine, in a career retrospective article dated March 26, 2021, recognized Yorn as one of his generation's best songwriters. Yorn’s twelfth album, All The Beauty, was released on July 24, 2026.

== Early life ==
Yorn was born in Pompton Plains, New Jersey, and raised Jewish in Montville, New Jersey, the son of Joan, a former school teacher and real estate agent, and Lawrence K. Yorn, a retired dentist and former Captain in the United States Army. Yorn attended Montville Township High School. Yorn graduated from Syracuse University in 1996. His brother Rick is a major talent manager in Hollywood and was responsible for teaching nine-year-old Pete to play the drums. His eldest brother Kevin Yorn is an entertainment lawyer.

Yorn mentions the Nova Scotia-based band Sloan as one with great influence on him, even admitting after seeing them live in 1999, he was so blown away by their talent that he wondered whether it would be worth continuing to even pursue his debut album. Sloan would later tour with Yorn in the US in 2002.

Yorn composed the score for Me, Myself & Irene in 2000. His songs "Strange Condition" and "Just Another" appeared in the film.

== Breakthrough ==
=== musicforthemorningafter ===
Yorn released his debut LP, entitled musicforthemorningafter, on March 27, 2001. It went gold on the strength of the album's lead single, "Life on a Chain." Rolling Stone Magazine named Yorn one of "Ten Bands to Watch in 2001" and gave the album a favorable four-star rating. Yorn and his band Dirty Bird toured for 18 months straight in support of his debut record.

Yorn went on to release the 2003 album Day I Forgot which had sold over 275,000 copies in the United States as of 2005 and scored a third radio hit with the song "Come Back Home." Q Magazine, in its 4 star review, described the record as simply "wonderful". The record also featured "Crystal Village", and "Turn of The Century". The latter was featured in the 2004 film The Girl Next Door. On the heels of the extensive 'Day I Forgot' tour, Yorn released a double live album, "LIVE From New Jersey", which was recorded at the Community Theater in Morristown, New Jersey.

In 2006, Yorn released his third album, Nightcrawler and toured extensively in support of it. He preceded every show with an instore acoustic appearance at an indie record shop in the town he was passing through. All of these instore performances were recorded, thus creating an extensive series of Live EP's. (complete list of instore EP's below). Nightcrawler was named one of the top 20 records of 2006 by Paste magazine.

=== The Trilogy ===
Pete Yorn's third studio release, Nightcrawler, completes a conceptual trilogy of sorts, which spans his first three albums (EPs not included); beginning in the morning with the musicforthemorningafter LP, continuing through the day with the Day I Forgot LP, and arriving at nightfall with the Nightcrawler LP.

In September 2006, in an interview with silentuproar.com, Yorn elaborated on his true intentions behind the trilogy, remarking that it was at least partially a conscious trilogy but wasn't meant to be taken too seriously: "I didn't mean like a Star Wars trilogy where it's one story at all." Yorn expressed that the "trilogy" was more of a diary of sorts; a person gaining new life experiences and simply commenting on them in linear order. "So it's a sort of continuing analysis of those topics, and the Nightcrawler LP would represent a later phase," Yorn said.

=== Subsequent releases ===
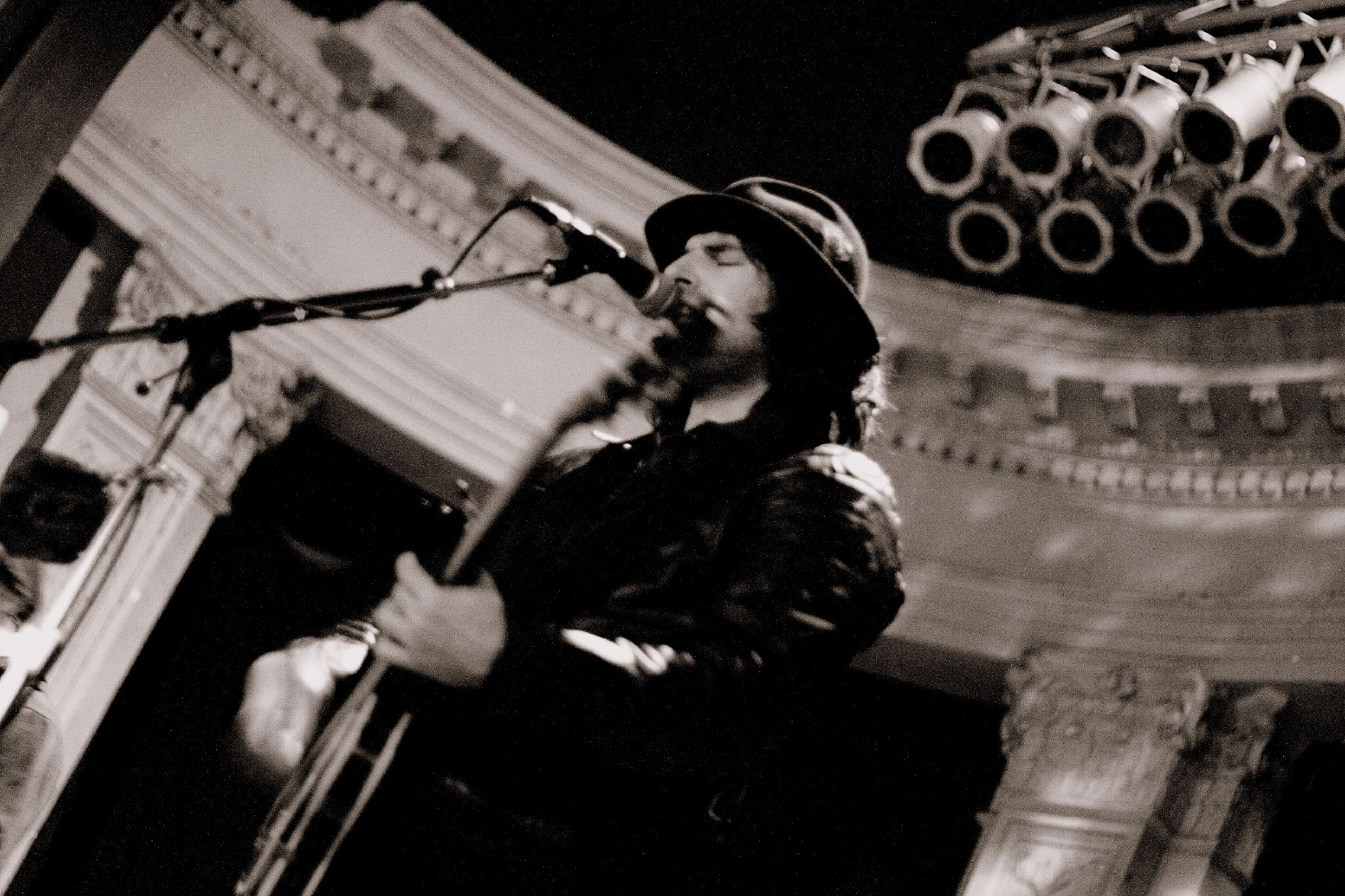
Yorn in 2006

In 2008, Pete Yorn recorded with Frank Black and released a new song, entitled "American Blues Vol. 1." A music video was shot for the single, and the song itself was released for free on Yorn's official website for a short period of time. Concerning the song, Yorn has said "I wrote American Blues Vol. 1. on the 4th of July after reading the morning paper. It's unlike any song I've ever written. I was moved by how much negativity I was reading about and how even groups were boycotting Independence Day because they were so disgusted with the state of our Nation. I was hoping things would improve...they obviously haven't yet...but I know they will in time."

Yorn appears on Canadian artist Matthew Good's 2009 album Vancouver performing backing vocals.

"Can't Hear Anyone," a song that Yorn wrote during the Nightcrawler sessions, was used for a Mercedes-Benz commercial and was released as a digital single on March 31, 2009.

Columbia Records released his Mike Mogis-produced album, entitled Back and Fourth on June 23, 2009.

Yorn toured with Coldplay as an opening act through summer 2009 and collaborated with actress/musician Scarlett Johansson to record a project entitled Break Up. The album was released on September 15, 2009, and its first single—"Relator"—was released digitally on May 26, 2009. The record has since gone platinum in France.

Yorn released a self-titled album on September 28, 2010. This record was released by Vagrant Records, and produced by Frank Black of The Pixies. It received a favorable 8/10 stars in Spin magazine and 4/5 stars in Mojo. He toured North America and Europe in support of this record February 14 − June 12, 2011.

In November 2012, Santa Monica-based radio station KCRW began spinning songs from a new record by a band called The Olms. DJ Jason Bentley has reported that Yorn is indeed a founding member of this group. On January 8, 2013, NPR's flagship station KCRW released a track by The Olms titled, "Wanna Feel It." The Olms' self-titled debut album was released on June 4, 2013 by the newly relaunched Harvest Records. On September 15, 2013, Yorn and The Olms performed along with Vampire Weekend at the iTunes Festival in London. An EP was released of the performance in conjunction with a documentary centered around their first tour which premiered on November 12, 2013. Allmusic.com in its 4 star review of The Olms had this to say: "...an excellent album by two guys who have discovered the transformative power that can be derived from collaboration".

On November 6, 2015 in a statement to fans, Yorn announced that he had signed to Capitol Records and would be releasing his sixth studio album, ArrangingTime in early 2016.

In 2018, Yorn once again collaborated with Johansson on a new EP, Apart, their first such project since working together on 2009's Break Up. In an interview with Forbes, Yorn remarked on how much the album, contrasted with the previous collaboration, provides perspective on how his life changed in the past decade, while Johansson teased a third album presumably to be released in the late 2020s.

On August 9, 2019 Yorn released his seventh solo full-length album Caretakers via his new label Shelly Music. It was produced by Pete Yorn and Jackson Phillips of Day Wave. Stephen Thomas Erlewine gave Caretakers four stars in his All Music Guide review, calling it "...an appealing blend that sets it apart from most other albums in 2019". The first single from Caretakers, "Calm Down", reached #2 on the Mediabase AAA radio chart, almost 19 years after his debut single "Life on a Chain" went all the way to #1 and stayed there for 6 weeks back in 2001.

=== Pete Yorn Live at the Troubadour ===
Pete Yorn Live at the Troubadour was released digitally and on CD via Bandcamp on May 14, 2020.

=== Pete Yorn: Live at the Fonda ===
Released on August 29, 2020 Pete Yorn: Live at the Fonda is a digital and CD double live release on Bandcamp. The package comes with a concert film shot by director and longtime collaborator Jim Wright (at the same show as the album on August 28, 2009). Covers during the set include Bruce Springsteen's "Hungry Heart" and New Order's "Bizarre Love Triangle".

=== Pete Yorn Sings the Classics ===
On January 15, 2021, Shelly Records released Pete Yorn Sings the Classics, a full-length record of cover songs. It starts with his version of the Pixies "Here Comes Your Man" and ends with the classic "Moon River" (originally recorded in 1961). Liz Phair, Rami Jaffee (Foo Fighters, Wallflowers) and Tim Walker (Minibar) are some of the guest musicians on the 10 song studio album. Yorn made the record with longtime friend and fellow musician/producer Marc "Doc" Dauer. The record was initially released on CD and digital formats through Pete's Bandcamp store. Vinyl release is expected for Record Store Day in the spring of 2021. Writer Jim Beviglia at American Songwriter called it an "outstanding new covers album" and added "The affection and care that Yorn holds for the chosen material show up early and often in Pete Yorn Sings the Classics." On January 19, 2021 Pete performed the song "They Don't Know" which was written by Kirsty MacColl on The Ellen DeGeneres Show.

Yorn followed this with Hawaii in 2022.

== Collaborations ==
Guitarist Peter Buck of the band R.E.M. has made appearances on several Pete Yorn recordings, including instrumentation on the single version of "Strange Condition" and a number of songs from the Day I Forgot LP. Yorn has worked with producers R. Walt Vincent, Brad Wood, and Ken Andrews of Failure and Year of the Rabbit, in addition to several other producers including Scott Litt, Butch Walker and Sonic Youth producer Don Fleming.

Yorn has shared bills with the Dave Matthews Band, R.E.M., Crowded House, Foo Fighters, Weezer, Coldplay, The Dixie Chicks, Semisonic, and Sunny Day Real Estate, among others.

Yorn has played at Carnegie Hall on two occasions as part of tributes to Neil Young and Bruce Springsteen. Yorn gave the 2011 commencement address to the Visual and Performing Arts class at his alma mater, Syracuse University.

Yorn can be heard on Guided by Voices' 2007 Live From Austin Texas album, singing back up and sporadic leads on "Cut Out Witch." Robert Pollard says after the song that he hopes it "doesn't ruin [Yorn's] career."

Yorn's song, "Lose You" can be heard just before the ending credits of the episode "Simple Explanation" during Kutner's funeral on the Fox show House.

Yorn has collaborated twice with actress/singer Scarlett Johansson: first in 2009's Break Up and again with 2018's Apart. The pair have suggested a third album can be expected after another 10 years.

== Discography ==
=== Albums ===
Year	Album	Peak chart positions					Sales	Certifications
Year	Album	US	US Rock	FR	GER	SWI	Sales	Certifications
2001	Musicforthemorningafter	111	—	—	—	—	US: 650,000	RIAA: Gold
2003	Day I Forgot	18	—	—	—	—	US: 275,000	
2006	Nightcrawler	50	17	—	—	—		
2009	Back and Fourth	32	14	—	—	—	US: 12,000	
2009	Break Up (with Scarlett Johansson)	41	14	18	89	58		SNEP: Gold
2010	Pete Yorn	66	22	—	—	—	US: 28,000	
2016	ArrangingTime	63	7	—	—	—		
2019	Caretakers	—	—	—	—	—	—	—
2021	Pete Yorn Sings the Classics	—	—	—	—	—		
2022	Hawaii	—	—	—	—	—	—	—
2024	The Hard Way	—	—	—	—	—	—	—

=== Live albums ===
- Live at the Roxy (2001) #131 US
- Live from New Jersey (2004)
- Pete Yorn Live at the Troubadour (2020)
- Pete Yorn: Live at the Fonda (2020)
- Pete Yorn: Live from Philadelphia 11.24.01 (2023)

=== EPs ===
- Sunset (2000)
- Westerns (2006)
- You & Me Acoustic: Live from... (2006)
- Live from SoHo (iTunes-exclusive) (2007)
- The Demos: Garage Sessions Vol. 1 (2009)
- Paradise Cove (2009)
- Apart (with Scarlett Johansson) (2018)
- Ever Fallen in Love (2021)

=== Singles ===
Title	Year	Peak chart positions				Album
Title	Year	GER	US Alt	US Adult Pop	US AAA	Album
"Life on a Chain"	2001	—	—	35	1	musicforthemorningafter
"For Nancy ('Cos It Already Is)"	2001	—	28	—	—	musicforthemorningafter
"Strange Condition"	2002	—	36	34	1	musicforthemorningafter
"Come Back Home"	2003	—	32	—	4	Day I Forgot
"Crystal Village"	2003	—	—	28	2	Day I Forgot
"For Us"	2006	—	38	—	5	Nightcrawler
"Alive"	2007	—	—	—	—	Nightcrawler
"Don't Wanna Cry"	2009	—	—	—	9	Back and Fourth
"Relator" (with Scarlett Johansson)	2009	91	—	—	—	Break Up
"Precious Stone"	2010	—	—	—	—	Pete Yorn
"Summer Was a Day"	2015	—	—	—	—	ArrangingTime
"Lost Weekend"	2016	—	—	—	16	ArrangingTime
"Bad Dreams" (with Scarlett Johansson)	2018	—	—	—	—	Apart EP
"Calm Down"	2019	—	—	—	6	Caretakers
"I Wanna Be the One"	2020	—	—	—	25	Caretakers
"Elizabeth Taylor"	2021	—	—	—	31	Hawaii
"Someday, Someday"	2024	—	—	—	10	The Hard Way
"Real Good Love"	2024	—	—	—	22	The Hard Way
"All the Beauty"	2026	—	—	—	30	
"—" denotes a recording that did not chart or was not released in that territory.

=== Non-album tracks ===
- "Hunter Green" – Trampoline Records Greatest Hits Vol. 1
- "Suspicious Minds" (Dusk Version) – "Suspicious Minds" CD Single
- "Suspicious Minds" (Dawn Version) – "Suspicious Minds" CD Single
- "I Feel Good Again" – Trampoline Records Greatest Hits Vol. 2 and Concert Series Volume 1
- "Do They Know It's Christmas?" – The Year They Recalled Santa Claus
- "I Wanna Be Your Boyfriend" – We're a Happy Family: A Tribute to the Ramones
- "Ever Fallen in Love (With Someone You Shouldn't've)" (Buzzcocks cover) – Shrek 2 soundtrack
- "Red Right Hand" – Hellboy soundtrack
- "Just My Imagination (Running Away with Me)" – Just like Heaven soundtrack
- "Skinny, Mean Man" – Say Anything's In Defense of the Genre
- "It Never Rains in Southern California" Stuck on You soundtrack
- "Undercover" – Spider-Man soundtrack
- "I Belong" – Open Season soundtrack
- "Where the Streets Have No Name," "Alice in My Fantasies," "I Feel Good Again," and "Chimes of Freedom" – Axis of Justice: Concert Series Volume 1
- "Splendid Isolation" – Enjoy Every Sandwich: Songs of Warren Zevon

== Videography ==
- "June" (2001), directed by Steven Orrit
- "For Nancy ('Cos It Already Is)," directed by Malik Sayeed
- "Life on a Chain" (2001), directed by Samuel Bayer
- "Strange Condition" (2002), directed by Marcos Siega
- "Come Back Home" (2004), directed by AV Club
- "Crystal Village" (2004), directed by AV Club
- "For Us" (2006), directed by Robert Hales
- "American Blues Vol. 1 (2009)
- "Sans Fear" (2010), directed by Eric Ernest Johnson
- "Lost Weekend" (2016)

== Backing band ==
Yorn's most recent touring band was composed of members of the indie dream-pop band Day Wave: Jackson Phillips (synth and guitar) & Henry Moser (bass) + previous bandmates, Joe Kennedy (guitar and keyboards) and Malcolm Cross (drums) Previous bands have included:

- Joe Kennedy – piano, keyboards, and harmonica
- Scott Seiver – drums
- John Spiker – bass guitar

Yorn's Back & Fourth touring band was:

- Max Goldblatt – tambourine
- Joe Kennedy – piano, keyboards, and harmonica
- Mark Noseworthy – guitar
- Jonny Polonsky – guitar and mandolin
- Scott Seiver – drums
- Zak Schaffer – bass guitar

Pete Yorn's Nightcrawler era touring band was Minibar, hailing from Britain and including the following members:

- Malcolm Cross – drums
- Sid Jordan – bass guitar and backing vocals
- Joe Kennedy – piano, guitar, and backing vocals (not part of Minibar)
- Simon Petty – backing vocals and guitar
- Tim Walker – guitars

Pete Yorn's former backing band went by the name Dirty Bird and includes the following members:

- Luke Adams – drums
- Terry Borden – bass guitar and backing vocals
- Jason Johnson – guitar
- Joe Kennedy – piano, guitar, backing vocals
- R. Walt Vincent – bass guitar
- Scot Coogan – drums

Pete Yorn's "eternal bandmates":

- Joe Kennedy – piano, guitar, and backing vocals
- WAZ – bass guitar, guitar, and back vocals
- Rick Yorn – drums

== Acting ==
Yorn appeared in a supporting role as “Acie Kirby” in Killers of the Flower Moon in 2023.
