= Hazel English =

Australian musician

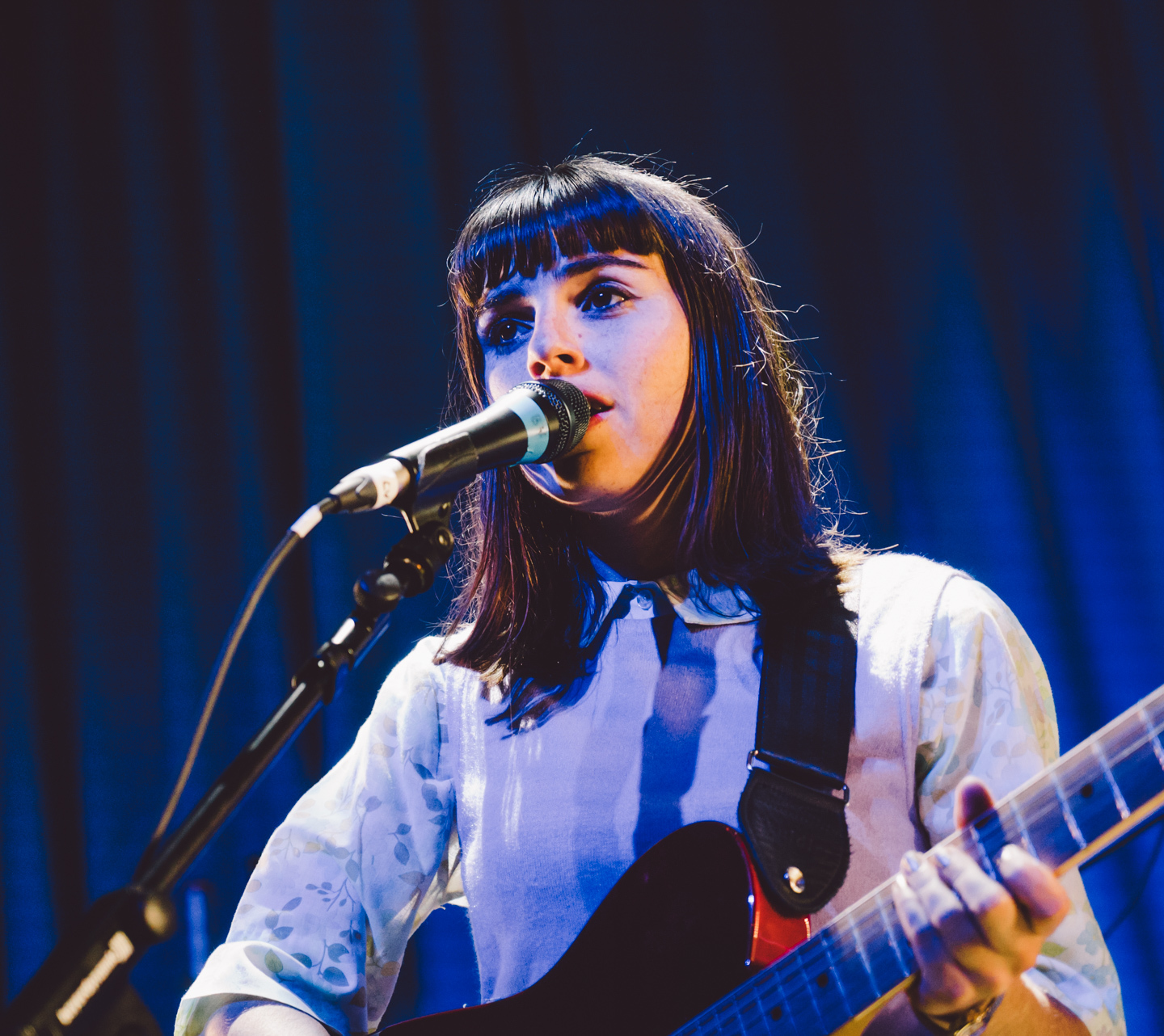
- Hazel English performing in 2017

Background information
- Born: Eleisha Caripis; Sydney, Australia
- Origin: Oakland, California, U.S.
- Genres: Indie pop; shoegaze; dream pop
- Occupations: Musician; singer
- Instruments: Vocals; guitar; bass
- Years active: 2015–present
- Labels: Marathon Artists; House Anxiety Records; Polyvinyl Records
- Website: hazelenglish.com

Hazel English (born Eleisha Caripis) is an Australian indie pop musician based in Oakland, California. She fronts a band of the same name.

== Early life and career ==
Before creating music, English devoted her time to studying creative writing in Melbourne, Australia. In 2013, Hazel moved to San Francisco for a student exchange program, and then to Oakland. Her musical career started as she performed on open mics, and with local performers. She met Jackson Phillips of the band Day Wave at the bookstore where she worked at that time. They became musical collaborators, with Phillips co-writing most of the songs. She formed a band, keeping the name Hazel English, and they played their first show opening for Craft Spells at the Great American Music Hall in San Francisco on September 9, 2015. That year, English published her first three songs on SoundCloud: "Never Going Home," It's Not Real," and "Fix."

In 2016, English released the EP Never Going Home on Marathon Artists Records and House Anxiety Records. On 12 May 2017, she released her double EP, Just Give In/Never Going Home.

=== 2019–2020: Wake UP! ===
On November 6, 2019, English released the single "Shaking," co-written by Blake Stranathan and produced by Justin Raisen. Stereogum said the song is a "strike right at the heart of ’60s psychedelia. Its ridiculously catchy core melody feels fresh while retaining a retrospective sensibility." The music video was directed by Erin S. Murray. On January 29, 2020, English announced on Instagram that she would release her debut album, titled Wake UP!, on April 24. The album was produced by Justin Raisen in Los Angeles and by Ben H. Allen in Atlanta. Upon release, Wake UP! received positive reviews, with critics praising English's development since her previous releases.

=== 2021–present: Summer Nights EP and Real Life ===
On May 10, 2021 English released her cover of the song "California Dreamin", originally recorded as a demo version for Polyvinyl's benefit compilation "Stay Home" where the proceeds where directed to the featured artists. On November 16, English released her first and only single of the year, "Nine Stories". The New York Times praised the song as "a three-minute dream-pop reverie, obscuring lyrics wryly bookish enough for a Belle & Sebastian song beneath a swirl of jangly guitars and shyly murmured vocals".

On April 21, 2022 she released the single "Summer Nights". It was featured on her third EP of the same name alongside the single "Nine Stories". The EP was released on June 17. It was produced by her long-time collaborator, Jackson Phillips. Describing the five track EP, she said it is "a series of interlinking narratives that make up one bigger story." It was also released physically through a Japanese label, P-Vine Records.

The music video for "Blue Light" was directed by Joseph Matick. On August 16, 2024 she released her second album, Real Life. Day Wave produced the album.

== Discography ==
=== Studio albums ===
- Wake Up! (2020)
- Real Life (2024)

=== EPs ===
- Never Going Home (2016)
- Just Give In/Never Going Home (2017)
- Combat (2020)
- Summer Nights (2022)
- Conversations (2026)

=== Singles ===
- "Shaking" (2019)
- "Off My Mind" (2020)
- "California Dreamin'" (2021)
- "Nine Stories" (2021)
- "Summer Nights" (2022)
- "All Dressed Up" (2022)
- "Hamilton" (2022)
- "Slide" (2023)
- "There She Goes" (2023)
- "Heartbreaker" (2023)
- "Real Life" (2023)
- "Jesse" (2024)
- "Baby Blue" (2025)
- "Calgary" (2025)
- "Gimme" (2025)

=== Collaborations ===
- Day Wave & Hazel English - PDA (2017)
- Day Wave & Hazel English - Apartment Complex (2022)
