= Relator (song) =

Single by Pete Yorn & Scarlett Johansson

from the album Break Up
- Released: May 12, 2009
- Recorded: 2006
- Genre: Indie folk; indie rock
- Length: 2:33
- Label: Atco; Rhino
- Songwriter: Pete Yorn
- Producer: Sunny Levine

Peter Yorn singles chronology
"Don't Wanna Cry" (2009)	"Relator" (2009)

"Relator" is the first single from Break Up, a collaborative album between Pete Yorn and Scarlett Johansson. It was written and arranged by Pete Yorn. The single was released as a digital download on May 12, 2009, and was available as an Amazon.com exclusive release. It samples lyrics from "All My Loving" by The Beatles.

== Promotion ==
On September 10, 2009, Yorn and Johansson performed "Relator" on the French television show Le Grand Journal.

Pete Yorn and Scarlett Johansson performed "Relator" on the October 12, 2009, episode of The Ellen DeGeneres Show.

== Music video ==
A music video for "Relator" was released on August 12 on Yahoo! Music and subsequently on VH1. Directed by Jim Wright, shot at Studio 1444 in Hollywood, the video shows Yorn and Johansson interplaying as a couple while performing the song.

== Sales chart performance ==
Chart (2009–2010)	Peak position
Belgium (Ultratop Wallonia Bubbling Under)	10
France (SNEP)	19
Germany (GfK)	91
Switzerland (Schweizer Hitparade)	57
UK Singles Chart	189
