= Day Wave =

American indie rock musician

- Born: Jackson Phillips; 3 September 1989 (age 37)
- Origin: Oakland, California, U.S.
- Genres: Indie rock; dream pop
- Years active: 2013–present
- Labels: Grand Jury; Harvest Records; Fiction Records; PIAS Recordings
- Formerly of: Carousel
- Website: www.daywavemusic.com

Jackson Phillips (born September 3, 1989), known professionally as Day Wave, is an American indie rock musician, multi-instrumentalist, and producer based in Oakland, California. He was previously in the Los Angeles-based electro pop group Carousel, formed after graduating from Berklee College of Music in 2013. He released his debut EP Headcase as Day Wave in 2015. Phillips has been featured in LA Mag and Billboard. He opened for Blonde Redhead during their fall 2016 tour.

In November 2016, Phillips signed onto Harvest Records and released the single "Wasting Time". The song "Hard to Read" appears in 2016 video game Watch Dogs 2. In February 2017, he announced his debut album, The Days We Had, which was released on May 5, 2017. Phillips relocated to the Echo Park neighborhood of Los Angeles in early 2017. Like on his earlier EPs, Phillips recorded straight to tape on his full-length debut. Phillips's recordings with Day Wave included some of the earliest recorded work of Australian-American musician Hazel English, and they co-released a cover of Interpol's "PDA". On April 24, 2020, Phillips released his third EP, Crush. On June 24, 2022, he released his second studio album, Pastlife. Phillips produced 7 of the 10 tracks on Calum Hood's 2025 debut album Order Chaos Order.

Phillips' live personnel includes brothers Henry (bass) and Jack Moser (keyboard/synth) as well as Nick de Ryss (drums), and Alex Lasner (guitar). After Phillips co-produced Pete Yorn's album Caretakers, Phillips, de Ryss, Henry Moser joined Yorn's 2019 tour as his backing band. Yorn also collaborated with Phillips on the 2022 release Hawaii.

== Discography ==
=== Studio albums ===
- The Days We Had (Harvest, 2017)
- Pastlife (PIAS, 2022)

=== EPs ===
- Headcase (Self-released, 2015)
- Hard to Read (Grand Jury, 2016)
- Crush (PIAS, 2020)
