= Lissie discography =

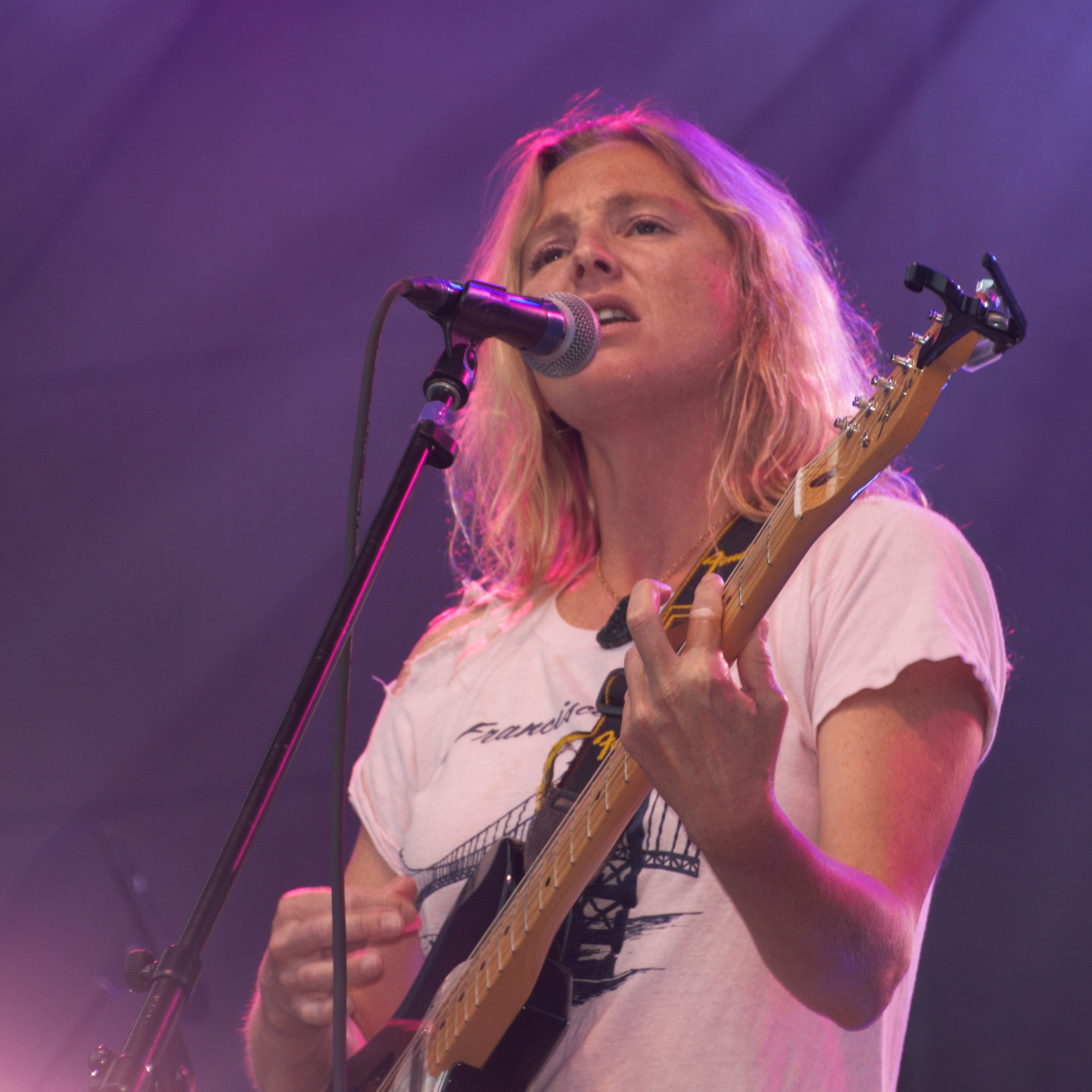
- Lissie performing in 2018
- Studio albums: 5
- EPs: 5
- Live albums: 2
- Compilation albums: 1
- Singles: 9

This is the discography for the American country rock musician Lissie.

== Albums ==
=== Studio albums ===
List of studio albums, with selected chart positions and certifications
Title	Details	Peak chart positions										Certifications
Title	Details	US	US Folk	US Heat	US Indie	AUT	GRE	IRL	NOR	SWI	UK	Certifications
Catching a Tiger	Released: June 21, 2010; Label: Columbia; Format: CD, vinyl, digital download	—	5	5	34	71	27	66	4	48	12	BPI: Gold; IFPI NOR: Gold
Back to Forever	Released: October 8, 2013 (US); Label: Fat Possum, Columbia; Format: CD, vinyl, digital download	160	11	4	31	—	—	91	3	62	16	
My Wild West	Released: February 12, 2016 (US); Label: Lionboy, Thirty Tigers, Cooking Vinyl; Format: CD, vinyl, digital download	171	5	1	8	—	—	—	9	46	16	
Castles	Released: March 23, 2018; Label: Cooking Vinyl; Format: CD, vinyl, digital download	—	15	3	13	—	—	—	—	80	9	
Carving Canyons	Released: September 16, 2022; Label: Lionboy; Format: CD, vinyl, cassette, digital download	—	—	—	—	—	—	—	—	—	30	
"—" denotes an album that did not chart or was not released.

=== Live albums ===
List of live albums, with selected details
Title	Details
Live at Shepherd's Bush Empire	Released: November 7, 2011; Label: Columbia; Format: CD&DVD, digital download
Live at Union Chapel	Released: September 30, 2016; Label: Lionboy/Thirty Tigers/Cooking Vinyl; Format: CD, vinyl, digital download

=== Compilation albums ===
List of compilation albums, with selected details
Title	Details
When I'm Alone: The Piano Retrospective	Released: April 5, 2019; Label: Lionboy, Cooking Vinyl; Format: CD, LP, digital download, streaming

== Extended plays ==
List of EPs, with selected chart positions
Title	Details	Peak chart positions	
Title	Details	US Folk	US Heat
Lissie	Released: March 2007 (re-released: March 2013); Label: Lionboy; Format: CD	—	—
Why You Runnin'	Released: November 2009; Label: Fat Possum; Format: CD, digital download	10	29
Covered Up with Flowers	Released: November 2011; Label: Fat Possum; Format: CD, vinyl, digital download	19	22
Love in the City	Released: June 2013; Label: Sony Music UK; Format: Digital download	—	—
Cryin' to You	Released: March 10, 2014; Label: Independent; Format: Digital download	—	—
Thank You to the Flowers	Released: November 20, 2020; Label: Lionboy; Format: Digital download, streaming	—	—
Promises	Released: August 22, 2025	—	—
"—" denotes an EP that did not chart or was not released.

== Singles ==
List of singles, with selected chart positions
Title	Year	Peak chart positions					Album
Title	Year	GER	NOR	SWI	UK	US AAA	Album
"In Sleep"	2010	—	—	—	—	—	Catching a Tiger
"When I'm Alone"	2010	42	2	73	55	—	Catching a Tiger
"Cuckoo"	2010	—	—	—	81	—	Catching a Tiger
"Everywhere I Go"	2010	—	—	—	—	—	Catching a Tiger
"Go Your Own Way"	2012	—	—	—	52	—	Covered Up with Flowers
"Shameless"	2013	—	—	—	—	—	Back to Forever
"Further Away (Romance Police)"	2013	—	—	—	98	—	Back to Forever
"Sleepwalking"	2013	—	—	—	106	—	Back to Forever
"They All Want You"	2013	—	—	—	—	—	Back to Forever
"The Habit"	2014	—	—	—	—	—	Back to Forever
"Hero"	2015	—	—	—	—	—	My Wild West
"Don't You Give Up On Me"	2016	—	—	—	—	27	My Wild West
"Daughters"	2016	—	—	—	—	—	My Wild West
"Hollywood"	2016	—	—	—	—	—	My Wild West
"Boyfriend"	2017	—	—	—	—	—	Castles
"Blood & Muscle"	2017	—	—	—	—	—	Castles
"Best Days"	2018	—	—	—	—	9	Castles
"Love Blows"	2018	—	—	—	—	—	Castles
"Peace on Earth"	2018	—	—	—	—	—	Non-album single
"Peace"	2020	—	—	—	—	—	Castles
"Just Because I Can"	2020	—	—	—	—	—	Catching a Tiger (Anniversary Edition)
"Wrecking Ball"	2020	—	—	—	—	—	Thank You to the Flowers
"A Bird Could Love a Fish"	2021	—	—	—	—	—	Catching a Tiger (Anniversary Edition)
"It's the Alcohol"	2021	—	—	—	—	—	Watch Over Me (Early Works 2002–2009)
"Flowers"	2022	—	—	—	—	—	Carving Canyons
"Night Moves"	2022	—	—	—	—	23	Carving Canyons
"Sad"	2022	—	—	—	—	—	Carving Canyons
"Chasing the Sun"	2022	—	—	—	—	—	Carving Canyons
"—" denotes a single that did not chart or was not released..

== Other appearances ==
These songs have been released on albums that were not a studio album released by Lissie.

List of other appearances by Lissie
Year	Title	Album
2004	"All My Life" (DJ Harry feat. Lissie)	Collision
2007	"Let it Shine"	The Simple Life: Camp Songs
2007	"You Are My Sunshine"	The Simple Life: Camp Songs
2007	"Bright Side"	Wedding Daze OST
2008	"The Longest Road" (Morgan Page feat. Lissie)	Elevate
2009	"All Be Okay"	Beachwood Rockers' Society: Volume 1: Live At Crane's Hollywood Tavern
2010	"When I'm Alone"	4.3.2.1 OST
2010	"The Socialite" (Andy Clockwise feat. Lissie)	Are You Well? EP
2010	"Don't Be the One" (George Stanford feat. Lissie)	Roll Away EP
2010	"Believe" (Morgan Page feat. Lissie)	Believe
2010	"Fight for You" (Morgan Page feat. Lissie)	Believe
2010	"Strange Condition" (Morgan Page feat. Lissie)	Believe
2011	"No One" (Bigbang feat. Lissie)	Epic Scrap Metal
2011	"I'll Never Let Go" (Snow Patrol)	Fallen Empires
2011	"The Garden Rules" (Snow Patrol)	Fallen Empires
2011	"Fallen Empires" (Snow Patrol)	Fallen Empires
2011	"Those Distant Bells" (Snow Patrol)	Fallen Empires
2012	"Hands on the Wheel" (Schoolboy Q feat. ASAP Rocky; Lissie Sample)	Habits & Contradictions
2012	"Losers" (Robbie Williams)	Take the Crown
2015	"Wasted" (Jack Savoretti feat. Lissie)	Written In Scars
2017	"I've Been Losing You" (A-ha feat. Lissie)	MTV Unplugged: Summer Solstice

== Songs in other media ==
List of songs in other media by Lissie
Year	Song	Title	Type
2005	"Something Stupid" (with Peter Dante)	Deuce Bigalow: European Gigolo	Film
2006	"All My Life" (DJ Harry feat. Lissie)	Memory	Film
2006	"All My Life" (DJ Harry feat. Lissie)	The O.C.	TV series episode: "The Sister Act"
2006	"All My Life" (DJ Harry feat. Lissie)	Veronica Mars	TV series episode: "Look Who's Stalking"
2006	"All My Life" (DJ Harry feat. Lissie)	Who Killed the Electric Car?	Documentary
2007	"Dream It Out Loud"	Dream It Out Loud	Film
2007	"All My Life" (DJ Harry feat. Lissie)	House	TV series episode: "Guardian Angels"
2007	"All My Life" (DJ Harry feat. Lissie)	Moonlight	TV series episode: "Arrested Development"
2007	"Bright Side"	Romtelecom	TV ad
2008	"Bright Side"	Wedding Daze	Film
2008	"All Be Okay"	Wildfire	TV series episode: "The Ties That Bind, Part 1"
2008	"All My Life" (DJ Harry feat. Lissie)	Wildfire	TV series episode: "The Ties That Bind, Part 1"
2009	"Fight for You" (Morgan Page feat. Lissie)	Melrose Place	TV series episode: "Shoreline"
2010	"Everywhere I Go"	90210	TV series episode: "Catch Me If You Cannon"
2010	"Everywhere I Go"	Dollhouse	TV series episode: "Epitaph 2: The Return"
2010	"Worried About"	Grey's Anatomy	TV series episode: "Superfreak"
2010	"Everywhere I Go"	Grey's Anatomy	TV series episode: "Time Warp"
2010	"Little Lovin'"	Justified	TV series promo
2010	"Here Before"	One Tree Hill	TV series episode: "What's in the Ground Belongs to You"
2010	"Everywhere I Go"	So You Think You Can Dance	TV series episode: "1 of 10 Voted Off"
2010	"Everywhere I Go"	So You Think You Can Dance	TV series episode: "Nashville/Dallas + Vegas Callbacks"
2011	"Record Collector"	Basketball Wives	TV series episode: "Episode 304"
2011	"Everywhere I Go"	Hall Pass	Film
2011	"In Sleep"	Mob Wives	TV series episode: "Unfinished Business"
2011	"In Sleep'"	Parenthood	TV series episode: "Do Not Sleep With Your Autistic Nephew's Therapist"
2011	"Worried About"	Switched at Birth	TV series episode: "This is Not a Pipe"
2011	"Little Lovin"	Footloose	Film
2012	"Nothing Else Matters"	Revenge	TV series episode: "Duress"
2012	"Go Your Own Way"	Book at Bedtime	Radio Series: "Stonemouth"
2012	"Go Your Own Way"	Safe Haven	Film
2012	"Pursuit Of Happiness"	Pretty Sweet	Film
2012	"Live Your Life Right"	Won't Back Down	Film
2013	"Everywhere I Go"	Tiger Eyes	Film
2013	"Nothing Else Matters"	Californication	TV series episode: "Mad Dogs & Englishmen"
2013	"Pursuit of Happiness"	The Dirties	Film
2013	"1,2"	Paranoia	Film
2014	"Mother" (Danzig Cover)	Evolve	Video game
2017	"Wild West"	Twin Peaks	TV series episode: "Part 14"
2019	"Dragula"	Haunt	Film
