= Bodywork =

Bodywork or body work may refer to:

- "Body Work", a song from the album In the Air and performed by Morgan Page featuring Tegan and Sara
- Body Work, a comic series set in the Rivers of London universe
- Bodywork (alternative medicine), healing or personal development techniques that involve touching, energy medicine, or physical manipulation
- Car body style, the structure of a vehicle
- Coachbuilder, the body of a motor vehicle
