= Life on a String =

Life on a String may refer to:

- Life on a String (album), a 2001 album by Laurie Anderson
- Life on a String (film), a 1991 Chinese film
- "Life on a String", a song by Pete Yorn from the album Musicforthemorningafter
