= Strange Condition =

Single by Pete Yorn

from the album Musicforthemorningafter
- Released: 2000 (Sunset EP); 2002 (Single)
- Genre: Rock
- Length: 3:57
- Label: Columbia
- Songwriter: Pete Yorn
- Producers: Brad Wood; R. Walt Vincent

Pete Yorn singles chronology
"For Nancy ('Cos It Already Is)" (2001)	"Strange Condition" (2000)	"Come Back Home" (2003)

"Strange Condition" is a song by American musician Pete Yorn. Produced and recorded by R. Walt Vincent and Brad Wood, it appears on his first studio album Musicforthemorningafter. It also appears on Yorn's 2000 Sunset EP as well as on the soundtrack to the films Me, Myself & Irene, 40 Days and 40 Nights, and The Sweetest Thing. Released as a single in 2002, the song peaked at #36 on Billboard's Modern Rock Tracks. The single version features additional collaborative instrumentation by R.E.M. guitarist Peter Buck.

It was covered by Morgan Page on his album Believe. This version features Lissie on vocals and was released as the second single of the album.

== Peak positions ==
Chart (2002)	Peak position
US Adult Top 40 (Billboard)	34
US Modern Rock Tracks (Billboard)	36
