= Æon Spoke =

Alternative rock band

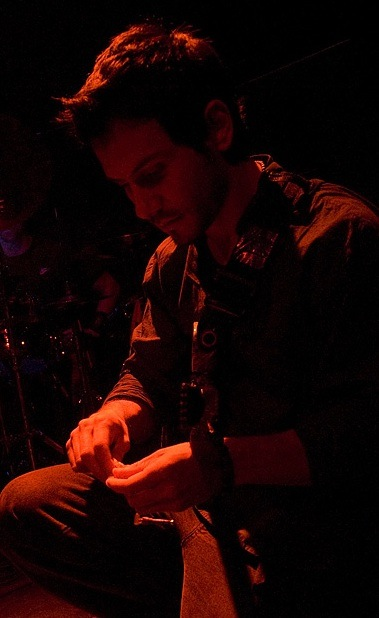
- Paul Masvidal performing live with Æon Spoke

Background information
- Origin: Miami, Florida (formed); Los Angeles, California (current)
- Genres: Alternative rock; acoustic rock
- Years active: 1999–present
- Label: SPV GmbH (2007–)
- Members: Paul Masvidal
- Past members: Chris Tristram; Stephen Gambina; Victoria Cecilia; Evo (E. van Orden); Chris Kringel; Sean Reinert; R. Walt Vincent

Æon Spoke is an alternative rock band from Los Angeles. It was created by members of Cynic and former members of Death, Paul Masvidal and Sean Reinert, when they relocated from Miami to Los Angeles.

In 2005 the track, "Emmanuel", appeared in the film What the Bleep Do We Know!?. Two of their tracks, "Damaged" and "Transform" also appeared on the Warner Brothers television series Smallville and One Tree Hill respectively. Also another song by Æon Spoke, "I've Seen Those Eyes", appeared in the movie Cry Wolf.

When asked by Nikola Savić about the status of the band in 2012, Paul said:

It’s pretty much on hold, you know. I was just playing a bunch of it today at soundcheck, but I haven’t really been thinking about it too much. I mean, I’ve got a lot material that maybe at some point in time will be released, but I don’t know – it’s one of those things, it’s kind of there, lurking, but I don’t know when it will reappear.

— Paul Masvidal

In 2016, Karlo Doroc from Heavy Blog is Heavy blogzine wrote:

Masvidal creates an air of loss, longing and bereavement which is unparalleled in the field. Even in the alternative rock scene, where such voices are replete, his stands above in its emotional impact. Couple this with layered, acoustic guitars, haunting, rusty synths where needed and drumming which ties the whole thing into a neat, digestible package and you get Aeon Spoke. It’s a powerful, yet oddly simple at times, side project which channels the melancholy and estrangement that had always laced Cynic’s main body of work.

In 2022, the self-titled album was rereleased. In an article, Chris Dick of Decibel Magazine wrote:

Æon Spoke is the reissue of 2006’s Æon Spoke on Steamhammer with noticeable differences. First, it’s been re-sequenced. This new flow feels natural and logical. Second, the mixing by Warren Riker (Down, Santana) and John Hiler (Slayer, Danzig) rockets the sometimes gossamer, always from-the-heart songs into the stratosphere. They sing from the speakers in the same way Jeff Buckley’s “Hallelujah” or Radiohead’s “No Surprises” cut to the emotional chase. Of course, the re-mastering by Jamie King (Between the Buried and Me, Canvas Solaris) is elevatory expression in and of itself.

== Line-up ==
- Paul Masvidal – lead vocals, guitars, keyboards

== Former members ==
- Chris Tristram – bass
- Stephen Gambina – bass
- Victoria Cecilia – bass
- Evo (E. van Orden) – guitar, effects
- Chris Kringel – bass
- Sean Reinert – drums, percussion, keyboards, backing vocals
- R. Walt Vincent – bass, background vocals, keys

== Discography ==
=== Demos and EPs ===
- Demo 2000 (2000)
1. "Nothing" [aka Damaged] – 2:24
2. "Ghostland" – 3:32
3. "No Answers" – 3:52
4. "Homosapien" – 3:33
5. "Is There Anyone" – 02:16
6. "Blinded" – 2:41
- Æon Spoke EP (2002)
1. "Emmanuel" – 3:33
2. "Sand & Foam" – 3:18
3. "Silence" – 4:09
4. "Blinded" – 2:45
5. "For Good" – 3:39
6. "No Answers" – 3:15

=== Radio sessions ===
- X-posure XFM Session (2003)
1. "Umbrella" – 4:00
2. "Pablo at the Park" – 5:11
3. "Silence" – 4:03

=== Albums ===
- Above the Buried Cry (2004)
- Æon Spoke (2007)

=== Compilation albums ===
- Nothing (2012)

== Videography ==
- Emmanuel [original version] (2004)
- Emmanuel [What the Bleep Do We Know!? version] (2005)
- Pablo (At the Park) (2007)

== Unreleased online songs ==
(2005)

- Tristan & Pelanore – 4:15
- Umbrella [BB Mix] – 3:49
- Umbrella [Dry TH Mix] – 3:53
- When Sunrise Skirts the Moor – 3:52
