= Elevate (Morgan Page album) =

Studio album / Compilation album by Morgan Page
- Released: March 25, 2008
- Recorded: 2007–2008
- Genre: Progressive house, house, electronic
- Length: 1:14:22
- Label: Nettwerk
- Producer: Morgan Page

Morgan Page chronology
Cease and Desist (2005)	Elevate (2008)	Believe (2010)

Singles from Elevate
- 1. "The Longest Road" Released: 2008; 2. "Call My Name" Released: 2008

Elevate is the debut studio album by American progressive house DJ Morgan Page, released on March 25, 2008 through Nettwerk. The album is a compilation of original songs and remixes that Morgan Page has done for other artists; it contains a total of four original tracks and eight remixes. It also includes the Grammy-nominated deadmau5 remix for his song "The Longest Road", featuring Lissie, as a bonus track. The remix was nominated in 2008 for Best Remixed Recording, Non-Classical.

== Track listing ==
All songs are written and produced by Morgan Page. Remixes with the original artists are noted.

No.	Title	Length
1.	"The Longest Road" (featuring Lissie)	5:43
2.	"Call My Name" (featuring Tyler James)	4:37
3.	"Peace and Hate" (Morgan Page Remix) (by The Submarines)	5:58
4.	"Fade Away" (featuring Matt Wasley)	3:57
5.	"Fuck Was I" (Morgan Page Remix) (by Jenny Owen Youngs)	6:44
6.	"Nervous in the Light of Dawn" (Morgan Page Remix) (by Leigh Nash)	6:26
7.	"Dirty Laundry" (Morgan Page Remix) (by Bitter:Sweet)	6:26
8.	"Maneater" (David Garcia & Morgan Page Remix) (by Nelly Furtado)	5:50
9.	"Angelicus" (Morgan Page Remix) (by Delerium)	5:53
10.	"One Day" (featuring Camila Grey)	3:41
11.	"Sleepwalking Through the Mekong" (Morgan Page Remix) (by Dengue Fever)	5:29
12.	"Under" (Morgan Page Remix) (by Under)	6:57
13.	"The Longest Road" (Deadmau5 Vocal Remix) (featuring Lissie)	6:41

iTunes bonus tracks
No.	Title	Length
14.	"The Longest Road" (Downtempo Mix)	4:10
