= Why You Runnin' =

EP by Lissie
- Released: November 2009
- Label: Fat Possum

Lissie chronology
Lissie (2007)	Why You Runnin' (2009)	Catching a Tiger (2010)

Why You Runnin' is the debut EP by American singer-songwriter Lissie, released in November 2009 on Fat Possum. It was produced by Bill Reynolds of Band of Horses. One of the songs, "Oh Mississippi" was co-written with Ed Harcourt, whom she met through a mutual friend. The EP was listed amongst Paste magazine's "Eight Most Auspicious Musical Debuts of 2009".

Three of the five tracks were later reissued in her debut full-length album Catching a Tiger.

== Track listing ==
Standard edition
No.	Title	Writer(s)	Length
1.	"Little Lovin'"	Elisabeth Maurus, Angelo Petraglia	4:30
2.	"Wedding Bells"		3:04
3.	"Oh Mississippi"	Maurus, Ed Harcourt	3:22
4.	"Everywhere I Go"	Maurus, Curt Schneider	4:06
5.	"Here Before"		5:15
