= Believe (Morgan Page album) =

Studio album by Morgan Page
- Released: February 23, 2010
- Genre: Progressive House; Electronic; Dance
- Label: Nettwerk

Morgan Page chronology
Elevate (2008)	Believe (2010)	In the Air (2012)

Singles from Believe
- 1. "Fight for You" Released: September 8, 2009; 2. "Strange Condition" Released: January 26, 2010; 3. "I've Had Friends" Released: November 9, 2010

Believe is the second studio album by American music producer, DJ, remixer, and songwriter, Morgan Page, released on February 23, 2010.

The first single from Believe was "Fight for You", featuring guest vocals from Elisabeth Maurus (a.k.a. Lissie). "Fight for You" has been featured in live sets by artists such as Tiesto, Armin van Buuren, Above & Beyond, Dave Dresden, and Hernan Cattaneo. The single was #6 on AOL's Top 10 Dance Songs of 2009, and was also featured as a free track on the iPod Touch/iPhone app Tap Tap Revenge 2.

Page's second single, a cover of Pete Yorn's "Strange Condition", also features vocals from Elisabeth Maurus.

== Critical reception ==
Professional ratings
Review scores
Source	Rating
About.com	5/5 stars
Allmusic	3.5/5 stars
Mix	positive

Believe received generally positive reviews. David Jeffries from Allmusic gave the album 3.5 out of 5 stars, writing: "While the melancholic mood throughout the record might wear on some, Believe is a well-crafted mood piece for the prog house faithful, featuring all the murky atmosphere the producer’s underserved fans crave."

About.com writer Scott Nelson gave the album 5 out of 5 stars, saying Morgan had "really figured out his place in dance music as the arrangement and production are pretty much perfect". Nelson singled out Maurus' voice as a better compliment for Page's music than the other singers featured on the album.

Sarah Benzuly of Mix wrote that "Believe is infused with melodic grooves, syncopated rhythms and textures that ebb and flow from one track to the next."

== Track listing ==
No.	Title	Length
1.	"Intro"	1:01
2.	"Strange Condition" (vocals by Lissie)	3:56
3.	"Believe" (vocals by Lissie)	4:07
4.	"Back to Life" (featuring Samantha James)	4:02
5.	"Fight for You" (vocals by Lissie)	3:56
6.	"Agnus Dei" (featuring Matt Alber)	4:21
7.	"Only Human" (featuring Natalie Walker)	3:50
8.	"Return to Me"	1:51
9.	"Tell Me Why" (featuring Angela McCluskey)	3:56
10.	"Traces Remain" (featuring Jan Burton)	4:21
11.	"I've Had Friends" (featuring Jan Burton)	5:40
12.	"In the Dark" (vocals by Morgan Page)	4:14
13.	"Coming Home"	2:40
