= Cuckoo (Lissie song) =

Single by Lissie

from the album Catching a Tiger
- B-side: "Bad Romance"
- Released: August 20, 2010
- Recorded: 2010
- Genre: Country rock
- Length: 3:36
- Label: Sony Music Entertainment
- Songwriter(s): Elisabeth Maurus, James Irvin, Julian Emery
- Producer(s): Julian Emery

Lissie singles chronology
"When I'm Alone" (2010)	"Cuckoo" (2010)	"Everywhere I Go" (2010)

"Cuckoo" is the third single from Catching a Tiger, American folk rock singer Lissie's debut album. It was released on August 30, 2010 for digital download, it reached number 81 in the UK.

== Track listing ==
iTunes Digital download
No.	Title	Length
1.	"Cuckoo"	3:36
2.	"Bad Romance"	5:38
3.	"It's Not Me"	4:01

== Chart performance ==
Cuckoo managed to peak to number 81 on the UK Singles Chart.

Chart	Peak position
UK Singles (OCC)	81

== Release history ==
Region	Date	Format	Label
United Kingdom	20 August 2010	Digital download	Sony Music Entertainment
