= Bertelsmann Music Group =

American record label

- Final logo used from 2002 to 2004
- Formerly: RCA/Ariola International (1985–1987)
- Type: Division
- Industry: Music
- Predecessors: RCA Records; Ariola Records
- Founded: 1985; 41 years ago (as RCA/Ariola International); 1987; 39 years ago (as Bertelsmann Music Group)
- Defunct: 6 August 2004; 22 years ago
- Fate: Merged with the first incarnation of Sony Music Entertainment, Inc.
- Successor: Sony BMG Music Entertainment
- Headquarters: New York City, New York, US
- Area served: Worldwide
- Products: Music; Entertainment
- Parent: RCA (1985–1986; 50%); General Electric (1986–1987; 50%); Bertelsmann (1985–2004)

Bertelsmann Music Group (BMG) was a division of German media company Bertelsmann. It relaunched as BMG Rights Management after the sale of the majority of its assets to Sony Corporation of America on October 1, 2008.

Although established in 1987, BMG was formed as RCA/Ariola International in 1985 as a joint venture to combine the music label activities of RCA's RCA Records division and Bertelsmann's Ariola Records and its associated labels which include Arista Records. It consisted of the BMG Music Publishing company, the world's third largest music publisher and the world's largest independent music publisher and (since August 2004) the 50% share of the joint venture with Sony Music Entertainment, which established the German-American Sony BMG Music Entertainment from 2004 to 2008.

== History ==
In 1994, BMG acquired Casa Ricordi, an Italian publisher founded in 1808.It also took Ruffhouse Records under its wings which houses American urban hip hop, a first for a German Label.

In March 1998, BMG sold its video game publisher BMG Interactive to Take-Two Interactive, with Bertelsmann taking a 16 percent stake in Take-Two. BMG Interactive notably held the published rights to Grand Theft Auto, which Take-Two's Rockstar Games developed into a series.

The joint venture between Sony and Bertelsmann to merge both companies' music divisions was set up in August 2004. It reduced the Big Five record companies to the Big Four record companies. At that time, the company had a 21.5% share in the global music market. Sony Music and BMG remained separate in Japan, although BMG Music Japan was wholly owned by Sony BMG.

On 27 March 2006, The New York Times reported that Bertelsmann was looking to raise money by leveraging some of its media assets and that executives from both companies were in talks about possibly altering the current venture. In 2008, Bertelsmann sold its 50% share of Sony BMG to Sony Corporation of America for a total of $1.5 billion and the company was renamed back to Sony Music Entertainment Inc.

While officially withdrawing from the business of recorded music, Bertelsmann continued its strong presence in other areas of the music industry by establishing BMG Rights Management, which specializes in music rights management and by representing artists and authors. It is mainly active in European markets. The basis of the company was formed through BMG's decision to withhold selected European music catalogues from the former Sony BMG joint venture and the BMG Publishing businesses.

Also kept separate from the acquisition by Sony Corporation of America was Sony BMG's wholly owned and operated BMG Japan. Sony Music Entertainment Japan remained independent from the Sony BMG joint venture, therefore BMG and Sony labelling were kept separate in Japan under the venture. During Sony BMG's buyout, BMG Japan was instead picked up by SMEJ. It briefly continued to operate as a distinct entity until a reorganization in early 2009 folded the company into Sony Music Japan.

== Subsidiaries ==
Now part of Sony Music Entertainment after the buyout of Bertelsmann's 50% stake in Sony BMG.

- Ariola Records
- RCA Music Group
  - RCA Records
    - RCA Red Seal
    - RCA Victor Group
      - The Windham Hill Group
      - Bluebird Records
  - Arista Records
  - J Records
    - Full Surface Records
    - Polo Grounds Music
    - US Records
- Arista Nashville
- RCA Nashville
- BNA Records
- BMG Kidz
- Telstar Records
- Zomba Music Group
  - Battery Records
  - Epidemic Records
  - LaFace Records
  - Jive Records
  - Music for Nations Records
  - Multitone Records
  - Pinnacle Records
  - Scotti Brothers Records
  - Silvertone Records
  - Verity Records
  - Volcano Entertainment
  - Zoo Entertainment
  - X-Cell Records

== BMG Music Publishing ==
BMG Music Publishing (formerly known as RCA Music Publishing), which was not part of the Sony BMG merger, was a business of the Bertelsmann Music Group until it was sold to Universal Music Group for €1.63 billion in 2007. Universal then folded the company into Universal Music Publishing Group, and the BMG name was retired. The company had been headquartered at 245 Fifth Avenue in New York, and had 36 offices in 25 countries.

=== Artists ===
BMG Music Publishing controlled over one million copyrights. Writers/artists signed to the company included: Elvis Presley, Ann Wilson, Todd Terry, Julieta Venegas, Anastacia, Kylie Minogue, Jaguares, Diana Yukawa, Kent, Alcazar, Gloria Trevi, Angélica María, Dido, Lee Ryan, Ai Uemura, Julieta Venegas, the Troubadours, Powderfinger, Nelly, Rammstein, Milli Vanilli, Modern Talking, Slayer, *NSYNC (1997-1999), Shania Twain, Nikki Webster, Ville Valo, Christina Aguilera, Kelly Clarkson, Coldplay, Yellowcard, Hum, Rob Dougan, the All-American Rejects, Clannad, Iron Maiden, Maroon 5, Mayra Verónica, Backyard Babies, Hipster Daddy-O and the Handgrenades, Soda Stereo, Gustavo Cerati, Keane, HARD-Fi, Horace Andy, the Cure, the Killer Barbies, Joss Stone, Tom Jobim, Vinícius de Moraes, Elvis Costello, Paul Weller, Sara Evans, Sneaker Pimps, Take That (1991–1996), Five, Chingy, Westlife, D-Pryde, Luke Friend, and Mikolas Josef.

Through Zomba Music Publishing, BMG controlled the rights to Linkin Park, Britney Spears, Iron Maiden, 30 Seconds to Mars, R. Kelly, Justin Timberlake, Michael Jackson, Bowling for Soup, Daft Punk, Katatonia, Ne-Yo, Anthrax, Mudvayne, and Poison. These artists' European rights are currently controlled by Concord Music Publishing, through Imagem.

The company's songwriters wrote chart-topping hits for Mariah Carey, the Black Eyed Peas, Kenny Chesney, The Game, Mario, Rascal Flatts, Milli Vanilli, No Doubt, Thomas Anders, Jessica Simpson and 50 Cent as well as legends like Bob Dylan, Elvis Presley, Frank Sinatra and Roselyn Sánchez.

BMG Music Publishing was the global leader in classical music and was number one in contemporary Christian music.

=== Catalogues owned ===
Through international sub-publishing deals, BMG Music Publishing represented the catalogues of Famous Music Publishing, Walt Disney, Roadrunner Records, Leiber & Stoller, Fremantle Media, Pete Waterman, and Malaco Records in various territories.

BMG Music Publishing acquired Complete Music in 2006.

Brentwood-Benson Music Publishing was BMG Music Publishing's Christian publisher and owned over 60,000 copyrights. Like with other assets of BMG Music Publishing acquired by Universal Music, it was renamed to Universal Music Brentwood-Benson. It is nowadays managed by Capitol CMG Publishing, Universal Music's Christian publishing operations under Capitol Christian Music Group.

== BMG Rights Management ==
After Sony bought out Bertelsmann's share in Sony BMG, Bertelsmann was allowed to keep the rights to several recordings from the former joint venture and rights to BMG trademark. These songs served as the foundation to BMG Rights Management. The company was originally founded with capital support of KKR, and later became a wholly owned subsidiary of Bertelsmann. It now serves as a division within Bertelsmann and as a replacement to the defunct Bertelsmann Music Group.

== Criticism ==
=== CD price fixing ===
Between 1995 and 2000, music companies were found to have used illegal marketing agreements such as minimum advertised pricing to artificially inflate prices of compact discs in order to end price wars by discounters such as Best Buy and Target in the early 1990s.

A settlement in 2002 included the music publishers and distributors; Sony Music, Warner Music, Bertelsmann Music Group, EMI Music and Universal Music. In restitution for price fixing they agreed to pay a $67.4 million fine and distribute $75.7 million in CDs to public and non-profit groups but admitted no wrongdoing. It is estimated customers were overcharged by nearly $500 million and up to $5 per album.

== See also ==
- List of record labels
- Sony BMG Music Entertainment
- RCA Records
- RCA/Jive Label Group
