= Me, Myself & Irene =

2000 film by the Farrelly brothers

- Theatrical release poster
- Directed by: Bobby Farrelly; Peter Farrelly
- Written by: Peter Farrelly; Mike Cerrone; Bobby Farrelly
- Produced by: Bradley Thomas; Bobby Farrelly; Peter Farrelly
- Starring: Jim Carrey; Renée Zellweger; Chris Cooper; Robert Forster; Richard Jenkins
- Cinematography: Mark Irwin
- Edited by: Christopher Greenbury
- Music by: Pete Yorn; Lee Scott
- Production companies: 20th Century Fox; Conundrum Entertainment
- Distributed by: 20th Century Fox
- Release date: June 23, 2000
- Running time: 116 minutes
- Country: United States
- Language: English
- Budget: $51 million
- Box office: $149.3 million

Me, Myself & Irene is a 2000 American slapstick black comedy film produced, co-written, and directed by the Farrelly brothers, and starring Jim Carrey and Renée Zellweger. The film centers around a Rhode Island state trooper named Charlie (Carrey) who, after years of continuously suppressing his feelings, suffers a psychotic breakdown that results in a second personality, Hank, and must deal with his newfound condition while escorting a woman named Irene (Zellweger) who is being hunted by her mob-affiliated ex-boyfriend. Chris Cooper, Robert Forster, and Richard Jenkins also star.

This was the Farrelly brothers' second film with Carrey since Dumb and Dumber (1994). Filming was done from May 11 to July 29, 1999, in various locations in Rhode Island and Vermont.

Me, Myself & Irene was released by 20th Century Fox on June 23, 2000, and was a box office success. It received mixed reviews from film critics.

== Plot ==
Meek veteran Rhode Island state trooper Charlie Baileygates is frequently taken advantage of by those around him, including his wife Layla. Almost immediately after their wedding, she begins to cheat on Charlie with their wedding limo chauffeur, Shonté, a black midget with a genius-level IQ. Despite his friends warning him of Layla's infidelity, Charlie denies it, even after she gives birth to biracial triplets, Jamal, Lee Harvey, and Shonté Jr., who also appear to be geniuses. A few years later, Layla leaves with Shonté, abandoning the children with Charlie, who raises them as his own. While they love and respect Charlie, the rest of the town continually abuses him. After years of such treatment, he develops a split personality named "Hank Evans" to deal with confrontations Charlie avoids: Emerging whenever Charlie is under extreme stress, Hank is an over-the-top, rude, and violent persona predisposed to exhibit all of the anger that Charlie keeps locked inside. A psychiatrist prescribes medication to keep Hank suppressed.

Believing Charlie needs a vacation, his commanding officer orders him to escort beautiful Irene Waters from Rhode Island to Massena, New York, where she allegedly committed a hit-and-run. Irene insists her mob-connected ex-boyfriend Dickie fabricated the accusation to keep her from revealing his illegal activities to the authorities. Unbeknownst to Charlie, the department intends to fire him upon his return. In Massena, Charlie turns Irene over to two EPA agents. A hitman with a contract on Irene kills one of the agents. She finds Charlie and they flee together, hastily leaving his medication behind, which causes Hank to emerge frequently. Charlie is unjustly blamed for the murder. FBI agents begin pursuing him and Irene, as do Boshane and Gerke, two crooked police officers on Dickie's payroll. The chase becomes a media spectacle, alerting Charlie's sons to his predicament.

Charlie and Irene begin a trek to return to Rhode Island, bonding along the way. Although Irene is taken by Charlie's personality, Hank worries her, as his aggressive personality and overestimation of his own toughness often gets them into trouble. Along the way, they pick up "Whitey", a waiter with albinism who claims to have killed his entire family. While stopping at a motel, Hank convinces Irene to have sex with him by impersonating Charlie. When Charlie realizes what happened the next morning, he is incensed and begins fighting with Hank. They are almost ambushed by Boshane and Gerke, but Charlie's sons, having found them, steal a police helicopter and call in a false report, stating Charlie and Irene have been apprehended in the woods nearby.

Charlie and Irene leave Whitey at the motel and board a train to Rhode Island. Dickie boards the same train, having been ordered by his police allies to "get his hands dirty". He kidnaps Irene, and Charlie chases him, working together with Hank to save her. Hank balks when Dickie heads onto a bridge, but Charlie finally faces his fears, thus permanently nullifying Hank. As Charlie tries to disarm Dickie, Dickie shoots off Charlie's thumb. Whitey then throws a lawn dart at Dickie, hitting him from behind and killing him. Charlie and Irene fall from the bridge into the river below, where his sons arrive to rescue them. Regrouping with Whitey, Charlie apologizes for making him kill again, but Whitey reveals he made up his backstory, fearing Hank. The police arrive, quickly learning of Irene's plight. Gerke and Boshane are arrested, Charlie is praised for bringing them to justice, and Irene is cleared of the charges against her. Charlie is promoted to lieutenant on the police force. Irene prepares to leave Rhode Island when the police pull her over, but this is only a diversion so Charlie can propose, which she happily accepts.

In a post-credits scene, everyone looks for Charlie's thumb in the river. Whitey finds it, but a fish eats it.

== Cast ==
- Jim Carrey as Charlie Baileygates / Hank Evans
- Renée Zellweger as Irene P. Waters
- Chris Cooper as Lt. Gerke
- Robert Forster as Colonel Partington
- Richard Jenkins as Agent Boshane
- Rob Moran as Trooper Finneran
- Anthony Anderson as Jamal Baileygates
  - Jeremy Maleek Leggett as nine-year-old Jamal Baileygates
- Mongo Brownlee as Lee Harvey Baileygates
  - Andrew Phillips as nine-year-old Lee Harvey Baileygates
- Jerod Mixon as Shonté Jr. Baileygates
  - Justin Chandler as nine-year-old Shonté Jr. Baileygates
- Michael Bowman as Casper ("Whitey")
- Zen Gesner as Agent Peterson
- Traylor Howard as Layla Baileygates
- Daniel Greene as Dickie Thurman
- Tony Cox as Shonté Jackson - Limo Driver
- Mike Cerrone as Officer Stubie
- John-Eliot Jordan as Pizza Boy
- Steve Tyler as Delivery Room Doctor
- Richard Tyson as Gun shop owner
- Ezra Buzzington as Disabled guy
- Shannon Whirry as Breastfeeding mom
- Lin Shaye (deleted scenes) as Mrs. Caleron
- Lina Teal as Bikini girl
- Anna Kournikova, Cam Neely and Brendan Shanahan appear in cameo roles
- Rex Allen Jr. as the Narrator
- Richard Pryor as Stand-Up Comedian on TV (archive footage) (uncredited)
- Chris Rock as Stand-Up Comedian on TV (archive footage) (uncredited)

== Production ==
Jim Carrey had been announced to star in the film in March 1999. Principal photography began in Jamestown, Rhode Island on May 11, 1999.

During the scene where Charlie is breastfeeding a mother, Carrey accidentally breast-fed Whirry's real breasts as he thought she was wearing a prosthetic breast; he later became humiliated when he found out that was her real breasts.

== Music ==
The film's original score was written by Pete Yorn, while the movie's soundtrack contains eight covers of Steely Dan songs.

Me, Myself & Irene: Music from the Motion Picture
No.	Title	Writer(s)	Producer(s)	Length
1.	"Breakout" (Foo Fighters)	Foo Fighters	Adam Kasper; Foo Fighters	3:21
2.	"Do It Again" (Smash Mouth)	Walter Becker; Donald Fagen	Greg Camp; Jacquire King; Eric Valentine (add.)	3:57
3.	"Deep Inside of You" (Third Eye Blind)	Stephan Jenkins	Stephan Jenkins; The Mud Sisters; Arion Salazar; Third Eye Blind	4:10
4.	"Totalimmortal" (The Offspring)	AFI	Butch Vig	2:50
5.	"The World Ain't Slowin' Down" (Ellis Paul)	Ellis Paul	Jerry Marotta	4:48
6.	"Any Major Dude Will Tell You" (Wilco)	Becker; Fagen	Wilco	3:06
7.	"Only a Fool Would Say That" (Ivy)	Becker; Fagen	Andy Chase; Adam Schlesinger	3:03
8.	"Can't Find the Time to Tell You" (Hootie & the Blowfish)	Bruce Arnold	Jerry Harrison	2:47
9.	"Bodhisattva" (Brian Setzer Orchestra)	Becker; Fagen	Brian Setzer; Peter Collins	5:41
10.	"Bad Sneakers" (The Push Stars)	Becker; Fagen	The Push Stars; The Commonwealth Jazz Quartet (co.)	3:15
11.	"Reelin' In the Years" (Marvelous 3)	Becker; Fagen	Jerry Finn; Butch Walker	3:26
12.	"Strange Condition" (Pete Yorn)	Pete Yorn	Brad Wood; R. Walt Vincent (co.); Pete Yorn (co.)	4:33
13.	"Barrytown" (Ben Folds Five)	Becker; Fagen	Caleb Southern	3:48
14.	"Razor Boy" (Billy Goodrum)	Becker; Fagen	Charlie Campagna; Billy Goodrum	3:45
15.	"Where He Can Hide" (Tom Wolfe)	Tom Wolfe	Tom Wolfe	3:35

"Motherfucker" by The Dwarves, "Fire Like This" by Hardknox, "Don't Say You Don't Remember" by Beverly Bremers, "The Perpetrator" by Hipster Daddy-O and the Handgrenades, "Love Me Cha Cha" by Jimmy Luxury, "Hem of Your Garment" by Cake, and "Highway Patrol" by Junior Brown were included in the movie, but not on the soundtrack. Pete Yorn's "Just Another" can also be heard in the background, during the scene where they discuss Hank's idea. Alta Mira's "El Capitan" can be heard in the background during the scene where Hank fights Charlie at the train station.

== Release ==
=== Home media ===
Me, Myself & Irene was released on VHS on January 9, 2001, and on DVD on January 23, 2001, by 20th Century Fox Home Entertainment. The DVD version includes deleted scenes, an audio commentary, trailers and TV spots, the Foo Fighters "Breakout" music video, behind-the-scenes footage, an extended branching version option, galleries, and DVD-ROM. This release is also THX certified and features two menus themed to Charlie and Hank, and a hidden Easter egg. The film was later released on Blu-ray on February 5, 2008.

== Reception ==
=== Box office ===
Me, Myself & Irene opened at number one above Chicken Run on the weekend of June 23, 2000, making $24.2 million in its opening weekend. Playing at 3,019 theaters upon opening, the film had the widest release of Jim Carrey's career, surpassing Liar Liar. It managed to beat out Life to achieve the highest opening weekend for a non-sequel R-rated comedy film. The film earned $90,570,999 in the United States, and a further $58,700,000 internationally, for a worldwide total of $149,270,999.

Me, Myself & Irene collected $1.9 million from its opening weekend in the United Kingdom, reaching the number one spot ahead of Scary Movie and Space Cowboys. It fell into third place behind below Hollow Man and Billy Elliot in its second weekend with $1.2 million. Meanwhile, in Australia, the film beat Mission: Impossible 2 to top the box office, making $1.6 million during its first weekend. It also ranked third behind Gladiator and Jet Set in its opening weekend in France, earning $682,000.

=== Critical response ===
Review website Rotten Tomatoes gave Me, Myself & Irene a score of 47%, based on 102 reviews, and an average rating of 5.4/10, with the consensus that "While Jim Carrey's comedic skills earn some laughs, Me, Myself & Irene sports a tired, unsatisfying plot." Online review aggregator Metacritic states the film has a score of 49 out of a possible 100, based on 35 reviews, indicating "mixed or average reviews". Audiences polled by CinemaScore gave the film an average grade of "B−" on an A+ to F scale.

Roger Ebert of the Chicago Sun-Times gave the film a negative review, describing it as "a labored and sour comedy" and criticizing the film for relying on repetitive gags and an unfocused plot, though he acknowledged Carrey's expressive physical performance. Bob Longino of the Atlanta Journal-Constitution explained that "it's too bad, then, that Me, Myself & Irene is clueless when it comes to constructing a plot with which to thread the powerful jokes."

Kenneth Turan of the Los Angeles Times similarly criticized the film's relentless crude humor, calling it exhausting rather than entertaining, despite praising Carrey's ability to shift between personalities.

Similarly, Peter Bradshaw of The Guardian described the film as cheerfully offensive and deliberately tasteless, highlighting its reliance on provocative humor and exaggerated comedic situations. Jay Boyar of The Orlando Sentinel stated that "some of it just seems tedious and repetitive, as if the Farrelly brothers couldn't decide where to take their Jekyll and Hyde idea."

In a 2020 interview with YouTube channel "Capital Buzz", Jim Carrey named the movie among his personal Top Five favorite films he worked on, alongside The Cable Guy, Ace Ventura: Pet Detective, Eternal Sunshine of the Spotless Mind and The Truman Show.

=== Controversy ===
On June 9, 2000, the National Alliance on Mental Illness (NAMI) sent a letter to 20th Century Fox, arguing that the film contains an inaccurate portrayal of Dissociative Identity Disorder. In the letter, NAMI executive president Lauire Flynn argued that "Me, Myself & Irene perpetuates a myth that schizophrenia—a severe, biologically-based brain disorder—is a split personality", and criticized how Fox was "seeking to dismiss such concerns with claims that the film is 'only a comedy'", stating that "for millions of Americans, schizophrenia and other mental illnesses are no laughing matter". NAMI asked Fox to release Public Service Announcements explaining real-life schizophrenia and DID, and Jim Carrey to explain the differences between schizophrenia and DID during interviews promoting the film.
