= Hipster Daddy-O and the Handgrenades =

American rock band

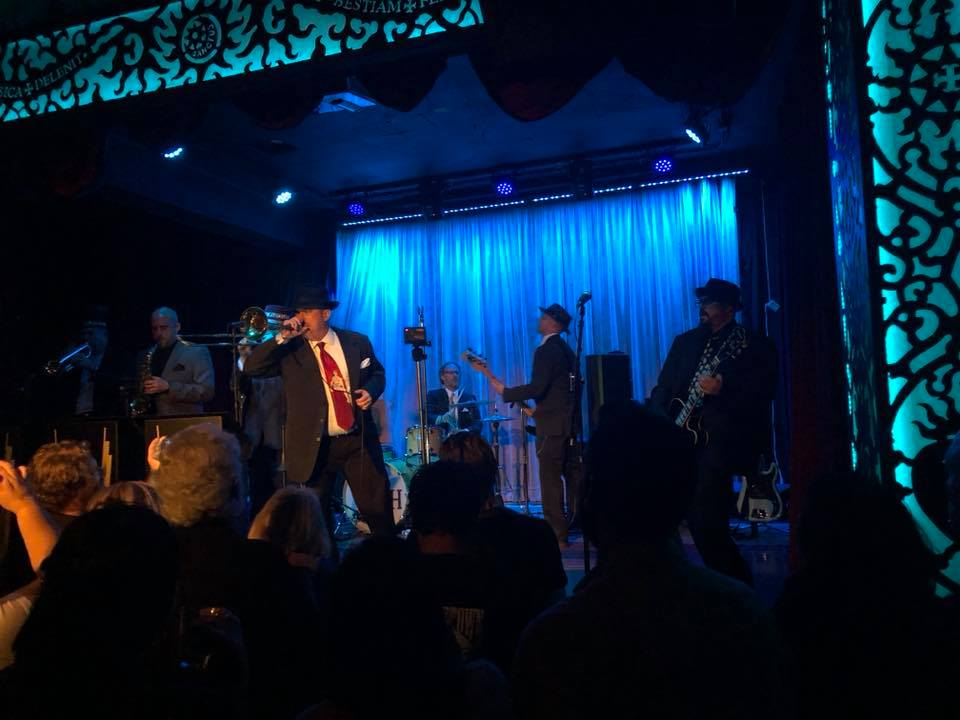

Background information
- Origin: Tucson, Arizona, U.S.
- Genres: Swing; rockabilly; ska
- Years active: 1997–present
- Labels: BMG, Slimstyle
- Members: Eric Allen, Mike Edward, Ty Lebsack, Daryl Seymour, Grant Lange, Kris Wiedeman, and Andrew Sternberg
- Past members: Andrew Skaggs, Jeff Grubic
- Website: www.hipsterdaddyo.com

Hipster Daddy-O and the Handgrenades (HDH) is a band that was formed in 1997 in Tucson, Arizona. Combining various influences from swing music, ska, rockabilly and rock, Hipster Daddy-O and the Handgrenades attracted a local following throughout the Southwest of the United States. They are most associated with the swing revival movement of the late 1990s. The band's musical style, however, transcends any single genre.

After earning critical praise and local awards from The Tucson Weekly (including "Best Swing Band 1998", "Best Dressed Band 1998" and Best Live Performance 1998") Hipster Daddy-O embarked on several national tours throughout 1998, 1999, and 2000, touring and playing shows with the bands Real Big Fish, Big Bad Voodoo Daddy, Goldfinger (band), Royal Crown Revue, Spring Heeled Jack (band), and The Aquabats.

Their debut album "Armed and Swingin'" was released in 1998 on Slimstyle Records and included the original song "The Perpetrator" which was later featured in the Farrelly Brothers movie Me, Myself & Irene starring Jim Carrey in the year 2000. The CD "Armed and Swingin'" also included the track "Daddy-O" that was later used at the 2000 Summer Olympics in Sydney Australia by Russian gymnast Elena Zamolodchikova in her gold medal winning floor routine. The band's second album "Diesel" was released in October 2000 on the Slimstyle and BMG Music labels. Hipster Daddy-O has also been featured in the October 1999 issue of Rolling Stone (Germany) and has had songs featured on several compilation CD's.

The band has recently played several live shows featuring all of the original members. Most notably, their 21st and 22nd anniversary shows which were held at Hotel Congress in their hometown of Tucson Arizona on May 12, 2018, and May 25, 2019.

== Current band members ==
- Eric Allen - Vocals
- Grant Lange - Trumpet
- Andrew Sternberg - Alto/Tenor Sax
- Kris Wiedeman - Trombone
- Mike Edward - Guitar/Vocals
- Ty Lebsack - Bass
- Daryl Seymour - Drums

== Former band members ==
- Andrew "Boozeman" Skaggs - Trombone
- Jeff "Tidypaws" Grubic - Baritone/Alto sax

== Discography ==
=== Studio albums ===
Year	Title	Label
1998	Armed and Swingin	Slimstyle
2000	Diesel	Slimstyle/BMG Music

=== Compilations ===
Year	Track	Title/Label
1998	"Swamp Thang"	Ska: The Third Wave, Vol. 5: Swing It, Beyond
1999	"Daddy-O"	Swing Sucks, Liberation
1999	"Daddy-O"	Rare Trax vol. 12 - Lets Swing, Rolling Stone (German)
1999	"Swamp Thang"	Swing It, Beyond
1999	"Daddy-O"	Next Generation Swing, Vol.2, Similar Entertainment
1999	"The Perpetrator"	Swing This Baby (Volume 2), Beyond
2000	"Old Letters"	Swing on the Wildside, Nervous Records
2000	"Sherry Wine"	Swing This Baby (Volume 3), Beyond
2003	"Goody Two Shoes"	Swing-A-Billy Chartbusters, Frankie Boy / Wolverine Records

=== Movie soundtrack appearances ===
Song	Film	Year
"The Perpetrator"	Me, Myself & Irene	2000
