= When I'm Alone (song) =

Single by Lissie

from the album Catching a Tiger
- Released: June 18, 2010
- Length: 3:40
- Label: Columbia, Fat Possum
- Songwriters: Elisabeth Maurus, Jim Irvin, Julian Emery
- Producer: Jacquire King

Lissie singles chronology
"In Sleep" (2010)	"When I'm Alone" (2010)	"Cuckoo" (2010)

"When I'm Alone" is a song by American folk rock singer Lissie, released as the second single from her debut album, Catching a Tiger. The song was written in London with Jim Irvin and Julian Emery, who also collaborated with Lissie on the singles "In Sleep" and "Cuckoo". It was released on June 18, 2010, through digital download. The song reached number two in Norway also charted in Germany, Switzerland, and the United Kingdom.

== Track listing ==
iTunes digital download
No.	Title	Length
1.	"When I'm Alone"	3:40

== Charts ==
Chart (2010–2011)	Peak position
Germany (GfK)	42
Norway (VG-lista)	2
Scottish Singles Sales (Official Charts)	47
Switzerland (Schweizer Hitparade)	73
UK Singles (Official Charts)	55

== Certifications ==
Region	Certification	Certified units/sales
Norway (IFPI Norway)	Platinum	10,000^{*}
^{*} Sales figures based on certification alone.
