= Musicforthemorningafter =

Studio album by Pete Yorn
- Released: March 27, 2001
- Recorded: 1999–2000
- Genre: Folk rock; power pop
- Length: 57:40
- Label: Columbia
- Producer: Pete Yorn, Brad Wood, R. Walt Vincent, Ken Andrews, and Don Fleming

Pete Yorn chronology
| Musicforthemorningafter (2001) | Live at the Roxy (2001) |

Singles from Musicforthemorningafter
- 1. "Life on a Chain" Released: 2001; 2. "For Nancy ('Cos It Already Is)" Released: 2001; 3. "Strange Condition" Released: 2002

Musicforthemorningafter is the debut album by Pete Yorn, released on March 27, 2001, through Columbia Records. Yorn supported the album by touring with Semisonic and Blues Traveler.

== Background ==
In May 1998, Pete Yorn recorded what was to be his debut album, thenightbefore, with producer Don Fleming. The album was recorded over the course of a week in New York City with Yorn playing all of the instruments. Virgin Records was interested in releasing the album, but wanted to rework the entire second half of the record; which Yorn refused to do. Shortly thereafter, Yorn returned to California and befriended R. Walt Vincent at a Sloan concert. Vincent introduced Yorn to digital recording and encouraged him to move away from the "alt-country feel" that his original recordings had.

== Production ==
Yorn and Vincent recorded Musicforthemorningafter throughout 1999 in Vincent's garage. After signing with Columbia Records, the label offered a slew of "super well-known producers" to work on their material, but Yorn declined. However, Yorn and Vincent later brought in Brad Wood to help "clean up and tie the room together." Ken Andrews, of the alternative rock band Failure, performed on and produced the album's sixth track "For Nancy ('Cos It Already Is)", while "Simonize" is the only holdover from the Fleming sessions in 1998.

== Reception ==
Professional ratings
Review scores
| Source | Rating |
|---|---|
| AllMusic | 4/5 stars |
| Entertainment Weekly | B+ |
| The Guardian | 4/5 stars |
| Q | 4/5 stars |
| Rolling Stone | 4/5 stars |
| The Village Voice | B− |

Musicforthemorningafter was well received by critics upon release. MacKenzie Wilson of AllMusic wrote, "The year 2001 belonged to Yorn, and his critical praise was not unwarranted, with Musicforthemorningafter marking the stunning beginning of a long, varied career." In his review for Drowned in Sound, Gareth Dobson singled out "Strange Condition", calling it "brilliant West Coast college rock". Sean Slone, writing for Ink 19, called the album's production "arresting and continually interesting", while criticizing Yorn's vocals.

Laura Morgan from Entertainment Weekly said "At times, Yorn’s influences – from Springsteen to Pavement – cast too strong a shadow. But he effectively marries creaky jam-band vibes and swirly indie-rock riffs and even makes a simple "uh uh uh uh uh" chorus ("Murray") sound amazingly fresh" Rolling Stone included the album twice in their Critics' Top Albums of 2001. Steven Chean called it "Folk-rock that actually rocks." John D. Luerssen added, "I have seen the future of rock & roll and his name is . . ."

== Track listing ==
All tracks are written by Pete Yorn.

| No. | Title | Length |
|---|---|---|
| 1. | "Life on a Chain" | 3:45 |
| 2. | "Strange Condition" | 3:57 |
| 3. | "Just Another" | 3:14 |
| 4. | "Black" | 4:11 |
| 5. | "Lose You" | 4:35 |
| 6. | "For Nancy ('Cos It Already Is)" | 3:30 |
| 7. | "Murray" | 3:45 |
| 8. | "June" | 2:34 |
| 9. | "Sense" | 3:53 |
| 10. | "Closet" | 3:03 |
| 11. | "On Your Side" | 5:02 |
| 12. | "Sleep Better" | 4:28 |
| 13. | "EZ" | 4:41 |
| 14. | "Simonize" | 2:54 |
| Total length: | | 57:40 |

=== Expanded edition bonus tracks ===
| No. | Title | Writer(s) | Length |
|---|---|---|---|
| 1. | ""New York City Serenade" (Bruce Springsteen cover)" | Bruce Springsteen | 7:17 |
| 2. | "Dancing in the Dark (Bruce Springsteen cover)" | Springsteen | 4:26 |
| 3. | "Panic (Smiths cover)" | Johnny Marr; Morrissey | 3:14 |
| 4. | "China Girl (David Bowie cover)" | David Bowie; Iggy Pop | 3:46 |
| 5. | "Strange Condition" (Rock version) | Pete Yorn | 3:51 |
| Total length: | | | 76:38 |

== Personnel ==
=== Musicians ===
- Pete Yorn - vocals, guitars, drums, bass, vibraphone, piano, analog synth, synth strings, casio keyboard, percussion, tambourine, finger cymbals, e-bow, handclaps
- R. Walt Vincent - guitars, bass, harmonica, vibraphone, Wurlitzer, piano, backing vocals, handclaps, organ, Mellotron, rhythm programming, horn arrangements, keyboards, acoustic bass, banjo
- Brad Wood - analog synth, drum programming, jaw harp, percussion, melodica, guitars, backing vocals, synth pulse, piano, percussion, fish, organ, handclaps, synth strings, finger cymbals, Wurlitzer, drum loops
- Ken Andrews - electric guitars, virus synth, and rhythm programming on "For Nancy ('Cos It Already Is)"
- Marc Dauer - electric guitar on "Murray", violin on "EZ"

=== Production ===
- Pete Yorn - producer, photography
- R. Walt Vincent - producer, engineering
- Brad Wood - producer, mixing
- Ken Andrews - producer, engineering, mixing on "For Nancy ('Cos It Already Is)"
- Don Fleming - producer on "Simonize"
- Jason Johnson - engineer on "Just Another"
- Jim Scott - engineer on "Just Another"
- Tom Lord-Alge - mixing on "Black", "Murray", and "Closet"
- Bill Emmons - engineering on "Simonize"
- Stephen Marcussen - mastering
- Brandy Flower - art direction, design
- Joe Marrapodi - cover photography
- Danny Clinch - sleeve photography
- Samuel Bayer - sleeve photography
- Paul Kulikowski - sleeve photography

== Charts ==
| Chart (2001) | Peak position |
|---|---|
| US Billboard 200 | 111 |

== Certifications ==
| Region | Certification | Certified units |
|---|---|---|
| United States (RIAA) | Gold | 500,000 |
