= Morgan Page =

American DJ and music producer

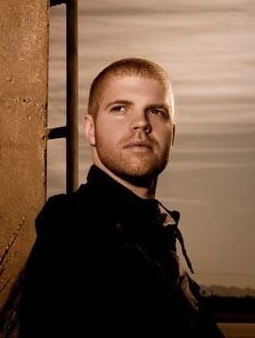
- Morgan Page in 2009

Background information
- Born: Morgan Wolf Page; May 31, 1981 (age 45); Burlington, Vermont, United States
- Genres: Progressive House, Electro House, Future House, Future Bounce, Pop
- Occupations: DJ, producer
- Instruments: Synthesizers, keyboards, drum machine, music sequencer, guitar
- Years active: 1994–present
- Labels: Nuance Recordings; Nettwerk Records; Armada Music
- Website: morgan-page.com

Morgan Wolf Page (born May 31, 1981) is an American DJ and music producer. His tracks include "The Longest Road", "Fight for You" and "In the Air". Page has received two Grammy Award nominations; a personal nomination for best remix with Nadia Ali and in 2009 his song was nominated for best remix; "The Longest Road" (Deadmau5 Remix). Page is signed to Armada Music worldwide.

== Early life and education ==
He was born Morgan Wolf Page in Burlington, Vermont. Morgan got his start early by interning while in grade school at German record label Plastic City. While attending Champlain Valley Union High School Morgan became a DJ on the University of Vermont’s college radio station WRUV 90.1FM. Morgan attended Emerson College in Boston, MA. While at Emerson, Morgan produced original songs, remixes, and was station manager at WERS 88.9FM, co-hosting the weekly show Revolutions.

== Career ==
Originally signed to the now defunct Fiji Recordings in 1999, Page went on to record for John Digweed's Bedrock label, Satoshi Tomiie's SAW imprint, Force Tracks, and Nordic Trax. Prior to graduating from high school, Page did a weekly show at WRUV 90.1 FM in Burlington, Vermont, then worked as a DJ and station manager at WERS 88.9 FM at Emerson College in Boston, where he attended school. In addition to his original compositions, Page has remixed songs by Nadia Ali, Regina Spektor, Madonna, Katy Perry, Meiko, Adam Lambert, Greg Laswell, Alanis Morissette, Dolores O'Riordan, Ashley Tisdale, Nelly Furtado, Delerium, Stevie Nicks, The B-52s, T. Rex, Uh Huh Her, Tegan and Sara, Coldplay, Korn, Wax Poetic, Norah Jones, The Submarines, The Police, Jeffree Star, HIM, Camila Grey and The Outfield.

Page's second studio album Believe was released on February 23, 2010 with the first single "Fight for You". The second single, a Pete Yorn cover titled "Strange Condition", was released on January 26, 2010. The third and final single "I've Had Friends" (a co production with Dave Dresden featuring vocals by Jan Burton) was released on November 9, 2010. The music video for "I've Had Friends" premiered on MTV in 2010.

On April 3, 2012, Morgan Page released his third studio album In The Air which featured collaborations with Sultan & Ned Shepard, BT, Angela McCluskey, Andy Caldwell, Tegan and Sara, Nadia Ali, and Greg Laswell.

In 2018, Morgan Page released his single "Lost Dreams" with DJ Jayceeoh and Kaleena Zanders, a track which he described as "different than my usual style – a bit more diva power to the vocal, and less ethereal and breathy." In the same year, he also recorded and released an EP called Born to Fly EP via Armada Music, with the track "Habit" being created during his tour in China.

== Discography ==
=== Albums ===
Title	Details	Peak chart positions			
Title	Details	US 200	US Dance	US Heat	US Indie
Elevate	Released: March 25, 2008; Label: Nettwerk Productions; Format: Digital download, CD	—	—	—	—
Believe	Released: February 23, 2010; Label: Nettwerk Productions; Format: Digital download, CD	—	—	—	—
In the Air	Released: March 6, 2012; Label: Nettwerk Productions; Format: Digital download, CD	—	—	—	—
DC to Light	Released: June 9, 2015; Label: Nettwerk Productions; Format: Digital download, CD	154	3	1	9
"—" denotes an album that did not chart or was not released.

=== Extended plays ===
List of extended plays
Title	Details	Track listing
Born to Fly	Released: 9 March 2018; Label: Armada Music; Format: Digital download	List: 1. "Born To Fly" (feat. Britt Daley); 2. "Lovesong" (feat. The Oddictions & Britt Daley); 3. "Habit" (feat. Meiko)

=== Singles ===
- 2008: "The Longest Road" (featuring Lissie)
- 2009: "Call My Name" (featuring Tyler James)
- 2009: "Fight for You" (featuring Lissie)
- 2010: "Strange Condition" (featuring Lissie)
- 2010: "I've Had Friends" (featuring Jan Burton)
- 2011: "In The Air" (with Sultan + Ned Shepard and BT featuring Angela McCluskey)
- 2012: "Body Work" (featuring Tegan and Sara)
- 2012: "Where Did You Go?" (with Andy Caldwell and Jonathan Mendelsohn)
- 2013: "Carry Me" (with Nadia Ali)
- 2013: "Your Love" (featuring The Outfield)
- 2013: "Against the World" (with Michael S.)
- 2014: "We Receive You" (with Carnage and Candice Pillay)
- 2015: "Open Heart" (featuring Lissie)
- 2015: "No Ordinary Life" (featuring Angela McCluskey)
- 2015: "Running Wild" (featuring The Oddictions and Britt Daley)
- 2016: "Real Life" (with Mako)
- 2016: "Don't Give Up" (featuring Lissie)
- 2017: "Candles" (with Steve James)
- 2017: "Other Girl" (featuring Rayla)
- 2017: "Fight My Way" (featuring Moses Keenan)
- 2017: "Beautiful Disaster" (featuring Stella Rio and Damon Sharpe)
- 2018: "Lost Dreams" (with Jayceeoh featuring Kaleena Zanders)
- 2018: "Let You Go"
- 2018: "Collusion" (with Swanky Tunes)
- 2019: "Gone My Way" (featuring Pex L)
- 2019: "Fire & Gold" (with Vivid featuring Allé and Damon Sharpe)
- 2019: "Reason For Living" (featuring Angel Taylor)
- 2019: "Footprints" (with Haliene)
- 2020: "You" (with Melo.Kids)
- 2020: "Addict" (featuring Jeonghyeon)
- 2020: "Fade Away" (with Vivid)
- 2021: "Like I Do" (with Steve James featuring Brooke Tomlinson)
- 2021: "Lost" (with Gian Varela featuring Fagin)
- 2021: "When I'm Right" (with Sick Individuals featuring Asia Whiteacre)
- 2021: "Turn Off My Mind" (with Lights)
- 2021: "I Love It" (with Bvrnout)
- 2022 "Wounded" (with Ferry Corsten featuring Cara Melín)
- 2023 "Firewalk" (featuring Lissie)

=== Remixes ===
- 2010: HIM – "The Foreboding Sense of Impending Happiness" (Morgan Page Remix)
- 2011: Nadia Ali – "Fantasy" (Morgan Page Remix)
- 2011: Daft Punk –- "Solar Sailer" (Morgan Page Remix)
- 2015: Borgeous feat. M.Bronx – Souls (Morgan Page Remix)
- 2016: Pegboard Nerds featuring Jonny Rose – "Downhearted" (Morgan Page Remix)
- 2018: Flight Facilities featuring Dustin Tebbutt – "All Your Love" (Morgan Page Remix)
- 2018: Ava Max – "Sweet but Psycho" (Morgan Page Remix)
- 2019: Alessia Cara – "Out of Love" (Morgan Page Remix)
- 2019: Deadmau5 – "Imaginary Friends (ov)" (Morgan Page Remix)
- 2020: Arty - "Kingdom" (Morgan Page Remix)
- 2020: Just A Gent and Caitlyn Scarlett - "Fire" (Morgan Page Remix)
- 2020: Gareth Emery - "St Mary's" (Morgan Page Remix)
- 2021: David Solomon featuring Ryan Tedder - "Learn To Love Me" (Morgan Page Remix)
- 2021: Mitis featuring Soundr - "Homesick" (Morgan Page Remix)

== Awards and nominations ==
=== Grammy Awards ===
Year	Nominee / work	Award	Result
2011	"Fantasy" (Morgan Page Remix) by Nadia Ali	Best Remixed Recording, Non-Classical	Nominated

=== International Dance Music Awards ===
Year	Nominee / work	Award	Result
2008	Morgan Page	Best Breakthrough Artist	Nominated
2008	"The Longest Road" (Deadmau5 Remix)	Best Progressive House/Trance Track	Nominated
2010	"Fight for You"	Best Progressive Track	Nominated
2012	"In the Air"	Best Progressive Track	Nominated
2012	Morgan Page	Best American DJ	Nominated

=== Independent Music Awards ===
Year	Nominee / work	Award	Result
2012	In the Air	Best Dance/Electronica Album	Won
