= Back to Forever =

Studio album by Lissie
- Released: October 8, 2013 (North America), October 14, 2013 (Europe)
- Recorded: 2012
- Genre: Pop
- Labels: Columbia (UK), Fat Possum (US)
- Producer: Jacknife Lee

Lissie chronology
Catching a Tiger (2010)	Back to Forever (2013)	My Wild West (2016)

Singles from Back to Forever
- 1. "Shameless" Released: April 26, 2013; 2. "Further Away (Romance Police)" Released: August 5, 2013; 3. "Sleepwalking" Released: October 13, 2013

Back to Forever is the second studio album by American singer-songwriter Lissie. It was released in the United States on October 8, 2013, and in the United Kingdom on October 14, 2013.

== Critical reception ==
Professional ratings
Aggregate scores
Source	Rating
Metacritic	69/100
Review scores
Source	Rating
AllMusic	4/5 stars
American Songwriter	3.5/5 stars
The Austin Chronicle	3.5/5 stars
The Independent	4/5 stars
PopMatters	(8/10)
This is Fake DIY	(6/10)
Paste Magazine	(8.4/10)
The Seattle Times	(Positive)
The Star-Ledger	(Positive)

Back to Forever received generally positive reviews from contemporary music critics. At Metacritic, which assigns a normalized rating out of 100 to reviews from mainstream critics, the album received an average score of 69, based on 14 reviews.

AllMusic gave the album 4 out of 5 stars, writing: "Lissie's strength is how she uses the past as foundation, not aspiration, and that's why Back to Forever is a lithe, unpredictable, and seductive collection of modern pop: it places equal emphasis on song and sound."

In a very positive review, Simmy Richman of The Independent writes: "Lissie is still a head-and-shoulders-above-the-rest singer and songwriter but where Catching a Tiger mined the 1970s Fleetwood Mac seam, Back to Forever moves things into the 1980s – all fist-pumping verses and “Kids-in-America”-like big choruses," adding: "And though the hipsters will never take Lissie to their hearts, their loss is the gain of those who care more for substance than style."

In a very positive review, Paste Magazine writer Elias Leight writes: "With puffs of backing vocals and a shiny bursting guitar solo, all escaping emotions are artfully contained. Lissie sounds most comfortable in this mode, chugging meticulously forward," giving Back to Forever 8.4 out of 10 points.

PopMatters writer Steven Horowitz writes: "Lissie makes one want to pump fists in the air and sing along because she always seems to be giving it her all. <...> Not every song on her new album works—just because something is art does not make it good art—but most of them do because she really outs herself out there. Her dignity comes not from holding back but from letting go," giving Back to Forever 8 out of 10 points.

== Track listing ==
Standard edition
No.	Title	Writer(s)	Length
1.	"The Habit"	Elisabeth Maurus, Julian Emery, Jim Irvin	4:10
2.	"Further Away (Romance Police)"	Maurus, Emery, Irvin	4:21
3.	"Shameless"	Maurus, Emery, Irvin	3:21
4.	"They All Want You"	Maurus, Irvin, Angelo Petraglia	4:00
5.	"Sleepwalking"	Maurus, Martin Craft	4:14
6.	"I Don't Wanna Go to Work"	Maurus, Crispin Hunt, Gordon Mills	3:42
7.	"Mountaintop Removal"	Maurus, Craft, Francis White	5:18
8.	"Love in the City"	Maurus, Craft	3:15
9.	"I Bet on You"	Maurus, Petraglia	4:33
10.	"Cold Fish"	Maurus, Justin Parker	3:39
11.	"Can't Take it Back"	Maurus, Greg Kurstin	3:29
12.	"Back to Forever"	Maurus, Craft	3:52

Deluxe edition
No.	Title	Writer(s)	Length
1.	"The Habit"	Elisabeth Maurus, Julian Emery, Jim Irvin	4:10
2.	"Further Away (Romance Police)"	Maurus, Emery, Irvin	4:21
3.	"Shameless"	Maurus, Emery, Irvin	3:21
4.	"They All Want You"	Maurus, Irvin, Angelo Petraglia	4:00
5.	"Sleepwalking"	Maurus, Martin Craft	4:14
6.	"I Don't Wanna Go To Work"	Maurus, Crispin Hunt, Gordon Mills	3:42
7.	"Mountaintop Removal"	Maurus, Craft, Francis White	5:18
8.	"What's It Like"	Maurus, Emery, Irvin	3:14
9.	"Love in the City"	Maurus, Craft	3:15
10.	"I Bet on You"	Maurus, Petraglia	4:33
11.	"Cold Fish"	Maurus, Justin Parker	3:39
12.	"Can't Take it Back"	Maurus, Greg Kurstin	3:29
13.	"Back to Forever"	Maurus, Craft	3:52
14.	"The Habit (Stripped Down)"	Maurus, Emery, Irvin	4:09
15.	"I Bet on You (Stripped Down)"	Maurus, Petraglia	4:20
16.	"Mountaintop Removal (Stripped Down)"	Maurus, Craft, Francis White	4:22

== Charts ==
Chart performance for Back to Forever
Chart (2022)	Peak position
Finnish Albums (Suomen virallinen lista)	43
German Albums (Offizielle Top 100)	100
Irish Albums (IRMA)	91
Norwegian Albums (VG-lista)	3
Scottish Albums (Official Charts)	13
Swiss Albums (Schweizer Hitparade)	62
UK Albums (Official Charts)	16
UK Album Downloads (Official Charts)	19
US Billboard 200	160
US Americana/Folk Albums (Billboard)	11
US Heatseekers Albums (Billboard)	4
US Independent Albums (Billboard)	31
