= For Nancy ('Cos It Already Is) =

Single

"For Nancy ('Cos It Already Is)" is a song by American singer-songwriter Pete Yorn produced and mixed by Ken Andrews. It appears on his 2001 album Musicforthemorningafter and it was released as his first UK single. Some versions of the single feature an acoustic cover of "Panic" by The Smiths.

Album Cover for Pete Yorn's For Nancy ('Cos It Already Is) (UK Single)

== Music video ==
The song's music video was added to rotation on MTV for the week ending October 14, 2001. That week, it also appeared in rotation on the College Television Network and Chicago's JBTV. For the week ending November 4, 2001, the music video ranked the 30th most-played video in MTV's rotation.

== Commercial performance ==
In the Billboard issue dated November 10, "For Nancy" attained its peak of number 28 on the Modern Rock Tracks chart (since renamed Alternative Airplay). It ultimately spent eight weeks on the chart. The single also attained success on the Adult Alternative Airplay chart, with Billboard reporting in its September 15, 2001, issue that the song was "nearing the top of" the chart.

== Track listing ==
1. "For Nancy ('Cos It Already Is)" – album version
2. "Black" – live version taken from Live at the Roxy
3. "Panic" (Marr, Morrissey cover) / "Life on a Chain" – live version taken from Live at the Roxy
4. "For Nancy ('Cos It Already Is)" – CD extra video
