= In the Air (Morgan Page album) =

Studio album by Morgan Page
- Released: April 3, 2012
- Recorded: 2010–2011
- Genre: Progressive house
- Label: Nettwerk
- Producer: Morgan Page

Morgan Page chronology
Believe (2010)	In the Air (2012)	DC to Light (2015)

Singles from In the Air
- 1. "In the Air" Released: July 5, 2011; 2. "Body Work" Released: February 7, 2012; 3. "Where Did You Go?" Released: September 18, 2012; 4. "Carry Me" Released: March 5, 2013

Professional ratings
Review scores
Source	Rating
About.com	4.5/5 stars
muumuse	4.5/5 stars

In the Air is the third studio album by American progressive house DJ Morgan Page released on April 3, 2012 by Nettwerk.

== Track listing ==
No.	Title	Length
1.	"In the Air" (with Sultan + Ned Shepard and BT featuring Angela McCluskey)	5:07
2.	"Where Did You Go?" (with Andy Caldwell and Jonathan Mendelsohn)	4:07
3.	"Body Work" (featuring Tegan and Sara)	3:59
4.	"Carry Me" (with Nadia Ali)	3:52
5.	"The Only One" (featuring Coury Palermo)	3:52
6.	"S.O.S. (Message In a Bottle)"	4:05
7.	"The Actor" (featuring Richard Walters)	4:36
8.	"Missing"	3:50
9.	"Light Years" (featuring Richard Walters)	4:22
10.	"Loves Mistaken" (featuring Shelley Harland)	4:05
11.	"Gimme Plenty" (featuring Shana Halligan)	4:07
12.	"Video" (featuring Tegan and Sara)	4:23
13.	"Addicted" (featuring Greg Laswell)	4:18

iTunes bonus tracks
No.	Title	Length
14.	"Heartland"	4:20
15.	"In the Air" (Mord Fustang Remix) (with Sultan + Ned Shepard and BT featuring Angela McCluskey)	7:37
16.	"Body Work" (Revolvr Remix) (featuring Tegan and Sara)	5:02
