= Castles (Lissie album) =

Studio album by Lissie
- Released: March 23, 2018
- Genre: Folk; pop; rock
- Length: 44:55
- Label: Lionboy; Cooking Vinyl
- Producer: Julian Emery; Nick Lotto; Lissie

Lissie chronology
My Wild West (2016)	Castles (2018)	Carving Canyons (2022)

Singles from Castles
- 1. "Boyfriend" Released: June 20, 2017; 2. "Blood & Muscle" Released: December 1, 2017; 3. "Best Days" Released: January 19, 2018; 4. "Love Blows" Released: March 9, 2018 (promotional); 5. "Peace" Released: August 11, 2020 (promotional)

Castles is the fourth studio album by American singer-songwriter Lissie. It was released through Cooking Vinyl on March 23, 2018. From the record four singles have been released with "Boyfriend" serving as the lead single with "Blood & Muscle" being released as the second single. "Best Days" was released as the third single with "Love Blows" following as the fourth. The album holds a score of 76 on Metacritic indicating positive reception.

== Background ==
Writing for the album commenced in late 2016 with Lissie moving from her long time recording base in Ojai, California to a more rural setting in Iowa. Lissie has said the setting change helped promote a "very natural and enjoyable" recording process. The album was released on March 23, 2018, through Cooking Vinyl on CD, LP and through online services.

The first single from the album, "Boyfriend", was released worldwide on June 20, 2017. The music video premiered on Lissie's official YouTube account on June 28, 2017, and was directed by Talain Rayne. "Blood & Muscle", the album's second single, was released on December 1, 2017. "Best Days" was released as the third single on January 19, 2018. The single stayed on the Billboard Adult Alternative Songs Top 40 chart for 18 weeks, from February 10, 2018 (No. 37) to June 9, 2018 (No. 40), peaking at No. 9 on April 28, 2018.

== Reception ==
Professional ratings
Aggregate scores
Source	Rating
Metacritic	76/100
Review scores
Source	Rating
AllMusic	3.5/5 stars
The Line of Best Fit	4/5 stars
NME	4/5 stars
The Skinny	3/5 stars

Critical reception to the album was positive, with Castles receiving a score of 76 based on 4 reviews on review aggregator website Metacritic. NME gave the album 4 stars with reviewer Leonie Cooper writing on the tack 'World Away' she writes "she weaves in sparkling, electronic production and heavily layered vocals to produce something bordering on the symphonic" also praising "Blood & Muscle's" passion by "belting out her demons against stripped-down piano." The Line of Best Fit gave the album a positive review and an 8/10 rating. Helena Wadia praised the album as her "most intense, open and raw yet – which seems to be in contrast with the fact it's the most all out pop record she's made thus far" summarizing "Castles is a message for those who are feeling uprooted – find self-determination, and never concede your power for love."

== Track listing ==
All tracks are written by Lissie

Castles track listing
No.	Title	Length
1.	"World Away"	2:33
2.	"Crazy Girl"	3:34
3.	"Castles"	3:36
4.	"Blood & Muscle"	3:53
5.	"Best Days"	2:53
6.	"Feels Good"	3:31
7.	"Boyfriend"	3:58
8.	"Somewhere"	3:24
9.	"Love Blows"	2:53
10.	"What Am I Gonna Do"	4:05
11.	"Peace"	3:39
12.	"Sand"	3:52
13.	"Meet Me in the Mystery"	3:04
Total length:		44:55

== Charts ==
Chart performance for Castles
Chart (2018)	Peak position
Scottish Albums (OCC)	6
Swiss Albums (Schweizer Hitparade)	80
UK Albums (OCC)	9
US Folk Albums (Billboard)	15
US Heatseekers Albums (Billboard)	3
US Independent Albums (Billboard)	13

== Release history ==
Release history of Castles
Country	Date	Format	Label	Catalog no.
Various	March 23, 2018	DL; LP; TP	Cooking Vinyl; Lionboy; Thirty Tigers	COOKLP695
Various	March 23, 2018	CD	Cooking Vinyl; Lionboy; Thirty Tigers	COOKCD695
