= Catching a Tiger =

Studio album by Lissie
- Released: 21 June 2010
- Recorded: 2008–2009
- Genre: Americana; rock; country; folk
- Length: 47:10 (Standard); 54:34 (iTunes edition)
- Label: Columbia
- Producer: Jacquire King; Bill Reynolds; Julian Emery; Ed Harcourt

Lissie chronology
Why You Runnin' (2009)	Catching a Tiger (2010)	Back to Forever (2013)

Singles from Catching A Tiger
- 1. "In Sleep" Released: April 2010; 2. "When I'm Alone" Released: 21 June 2010; 3. "Cuckoo" Released: 30 August 2010; 4. "Everywhere I Go" Released: 10 December 2010

Professional ratings
Aggregate scores
Source	Rating
Metacritic	69/100
Review scores
Source	Rating
AllMusic	4/5 stars
BBC	(positive)
The Boston Phoenix	3/4 stars
Evening Standard	4/5 stars
The Independent	(positive)
MusicOMH	3.5/5 stars
The Northern Echo	(positive)
Pitchfork Media	(5.4/10)
SPIN	(7/10)
Sunday Mercury	(positive)
Time Out	4/5 stars

Catching a Tiger is the debut studio album by American singer-songwriter Lissie, released in the United Kingdom on 21 June 2010 on Columbia Records. It was released in the United States on 17 August 2010 on Fat Possum Records. The album has sold over 750,000 copies worldwide and has been certified Gold in the United Kingdom and Norway.

== Singles ==
- "In Sleep" was released as the album's lead single in April 2010 and featured as iTunes single of the week in the UK.
- "When I'm Alone" was released as the album's second single as part of the album on 21 June 2010. It is also featured in the 2014 movie Dumb & Dumber To.
- "Cuckoo" is the third single, which also contains two other tracks, a cover of Lady Gaga's song "Bad Romance" and a b-side single called "It's Not Me". The single was released on 30 August 2010.
- "Everywhere I Go" was the album's fourth single.

== Critical reception ==
Catching a Tiger received generally favorable reviews. Paul Cole of the Sunday Mercury writes, "Lissie’s bluesy vocal prowls around a self-penned setlist like a caged tigress waiting to pounce on its keeper. Nothing prepares you for unashamed rock-out in Sleep, then Lissie abruptly changes direction for the ethereal Bully and Americana of Martha Wainwright-like Little Lovin'. Yet Stranger is 60s pop incarnate. A stunning debut album."

In a very positive review, BBC writer Mike Diver writes "Lissie Maurus makes a man sick to his stomach. Not because she’s no good – rather the exact opposite. Catching a Tiger is a debut that dreams beyond typical new artist parameters. It is the work of a girl who looks, even with a fag hanging from her pale lips, like an alt-fashion model. But she sounds like one of the greatest female vocalists of a generation, arguably without even really trying."

Evening Standard writer Rick Pearson also gave the album 4 out of 5 stars and listed it as one of the albums of the week. In his review, Pearson raves that "Lissie's smoky tones [echo] Fleetwood Mac's Stevie Nicks," describing the album as "brilliant."

Sammy Richman of The Independent writes in a positive review that "(Lissie's) debut album is as refreshing a slice of pop as these jaded ears have heard in years, channeling Edie Brickell one moment, Stevie Nicks the next, and Bobbie Gentry at will."

In a very positive review, Sophie Stratford of The Northern Echo praises Lissie for having "a voice which crackles with the influence of blues as much as it does with folk and a range and delivery that could put most rock singers to shame" before describing the album as "the perfect record for sunny days and driving on the highway with the wind in your hair."

== Track listing ==
Standard edition
No.	Title	Writer(s)	Length
1.	"Record Collector"	Elisabeth Maurus, Craig Dodds	3:44
2.	"When I'm Alone"	Maurus, Jim Irvin, Julian Emery	3:41
3.	"In Sleep"	Maurus, Irvin, Emery	4:58
4.	"Bully"	Maurus, Bill Reynolds, Tyler Ramsey	3:44
5.	"Little Lovin'"	Maurus, Angelo Petraglia	4:29
6.	"Stranger"	Maurus, Reynolds, Robert Meek	3:08
7.	"Loosen the Knot"	Maurus, Irvin, Emery	3:30
8.	"Cuckoo"	Maurus, Irvin, Emery	3:37
9.	"Everywhere I Go"	Maurus, Curt Schneider	4:09
10.	"Worried About"	Maurus	4:26
11.	"Look Away"	Maurus	4:30
12.	"Oh Mississippi"	Maurus, Ed Harcourt	3:23

iTunes edition
No.	Title	Writer(s)	Length
13.	"Needle Starts to Fall"	Maurus, Seth Kauffman, Valorie Miller, William Reynolds	3:48
14.	"This Much I Know"	Maurus	3:37

Anniversary Edition (Released in 2021)
No.	Title	Length
13.	"Just Because I Can"	4:59
14.	"I Don't Know What I'm Doing Anymore"	3:43
15.	"A Bird Could Love A Fish"	4:00
16.	"It's Not Me"	4:03
17.	"This Much I Know"	3:36

== Charts and certifications ==
=== Charts ===
Chart (2010)	Peak position
European Albums Chart	87
German Albums Chart	27
Greek Albums Chart	27
Irish Albums Chart	68
Norwegian Albums Chart	4
Swiss Album Charts	48
UK Albums Chart	12
US Billboard Folk Albums	5
US Billboard Independent Albums	34
US Billboard Top Heatseekers	5

=== Certifications ===
Region	Certification	Certified units/sales
Norway (IFPI Norway)	Gold	15,000^{*}
United Kingdom (BPI)	Gold	100,000^{^}
^{*} Sales figures based on certification alone.^{^} Shipments figures based on certification alone.
