= R. Walt Vincent =

R. Walt Vincent is a Los Angeles–based record producer, recording engineer, composer, and multi instrumentalist known for his work with indie rock icons Pete Yorn, Liz Phair and Tommy Keene.

Grandson of recording pioneer George Robert Vincent, founder of the Vincent Voice Library at Michigan State University, R. Walt Vincent studied piano and bass in his home town of Thousand Oaks, California before graduating from UCLA with a degree in music composition.

In 1999, Vincent produced and mixed Jonathan Elias' The Prayer Cycle for Sony Records. A symphonic work featuring the London Chamber Orchestra and Choir, the album showcased the talents of a cast of vocal soloists including the late Nusrat Fateh Ali Khan, Alanis Morissette, Salif Keita, James Taylor, Perry Farrell, Ofra Haza and Linda Ronstadt.

Following The Prayer Cycle release, Vincent began collaborating with singer/songwriter Pete Yorn, on recordings that would become Yorn's debut musicforthemorningafter (2001) for Columbia Records. The album, recorded in Vincent's Culver City studio with the assistance of veteran producer Brad Wood, included the hit singles, "Life on a Chain" and "Strange Condition" earned RIAA gold status for sales in the United States.

As musical director and bass player for Dirty Bird, the original incarnation of Yorn's touring band, Vincent appeared on The Tonight Show with Jay Leno, Late Night with Craig Kilborn as well as concert stages and arenas throughout the United States.

Returning to the studio to produce Yorn's follow up release, Day I Forgot, Vincent went on to produce successful albums for a wide variety of artists, including Liz Phair, The Format, SoulKid #1, House of Fools, Kip Boardman, Gush, Crosstide, and Tommy Keene. Vincent's latest production, Prayer Cycle II, the follow-up by Jonathan Elias, again features a number of performers including Sting, Sinéad O'Connor, Jonathan Davies, and Serj Tankian, among others, and was scheduled for release in the fall of 2009.

In addition to production, Vincent is credited as a musician performing a variety of instruments, including drums, bass, guitars, and keyboards, banjo, and harmonium. In addition to his own productions, he has performed on records for a number of other artists including James Blunt, The Bangles, Fastball, and The Twilight Singers. As a composer, his songs have been featured in films including Scary Movie 3, Cry Wolf, and the Jim Carrey comedy Me, Myself & Irene. Vincent compositions can also be heard in a number of national TV spots and promotional campaigns including American Movie Channel, Lee Jeans, Carl's Jr., Budweiser, and Evergreen Investments.
