= Valorie Miller =

American singer-songwriter

Valorie Miller is a folk guitarist and singer-songwriter from Asheville, North Carolina.

== Biography ==
Miller was born in North Carolina, and began her musical career after receiving an Emerging Artist grant from the North Carolina Arts Council in the late 1990s, which she used to make her first recording. Before releasing her solo debut album, Analog, in 2000, Miller performed as a stand-up bassist for Malcolm Holcombe, during which time she toured across the country. She and Holcombe co-produced her third album, Sweeter than Salt, with help from sound engineer Richard McLauren. Her sixth album, Turtle Shell, was recorded in eight hours.

== Critical reception ==
Grant Alden of No Depression wrote that Miller's song "Not My Daughter" was "A raw, blue, keening mountain song that had to have emerged from somewhere deep within" and described it as "spectacular." Jerry Withrow, also of No Depression, wrote that the songs on her third album, Sweeter than Salt, were "the most fully realized of her career to date." He also wrote that on the album, "Her vocals -- pure Carolina, from whisper to wail -- reach that goal of a personal sound, with an assurance and control directly attributable to those grueling nights on the road [when she was on tour]." PopMatters' Alan Brown gave Miller's fourth album, Folk Star, an 8 out of 10 rating, writing that it "serves as the perfect reminder that you can never underestimate the power of an original voice." Robert Christgau gave her fifth album, Autumn Eyes, a "choice cut" rating, identifying "Fire Song" as the only good track on the album. Stephen Judge of Blurt wrote that Turtle Shell was "a sparse, intimate affair, no doubt reflective of the kind of solo Miller show you might get if you wandered into a local pub or gallery where she was appearing." Dan Armonaitis of the Spartanburg Herald-Journal compared her musical style to that of Lucinda Williams and Bobbie Gentry.

== Discography ==
- Analog (Redhead, 2000)
- Ghost Tracks (Redhead, 2002)
- Sweeter Than Salt (Redhead, 2006)
- Folk Star (Grandmother Alice, 2006)
- Autumn Eyes (Grandmother Alice, 2008)
- Turtle Shell (Grandmother Alice, 2012)
- Only The Killer (Blackbird Record Label Indie AM Gold, 2022)
