= My Wild West =

Studio album by Lissie
- Released: 12 February 2016
- Genres: Folk, rock
- Length: 42:55
- Language: English
- Labels: Lionboy & Thirty Tigers, Cooking Vinyl
- Producers: Curt Schneider, Bill Reynolds

Lissie chronology
Back to Forever (2013)	My Wild West (2016)	Castles (2018)

Singles from My Wild West
- 1. "Hero (promotional)" Released: November 5, 2015; 2. "Don't You Give Up On Me" Released: January 15, 2016; 3. "Daughters" Released: March 2, 2016; 4. "Wild West" Released: July 18, 2016

My Wild West is the third album by American singer-songwriter Lissie, released on February 12, 2016. It is released under her own label, Lionboy, together with Thirty Tigers. In anticipation of the album, a music video for the promotional single "Hero" was released on November 5, 2015.

The album has three singles: the promotional single "Hero", the lead single "Don't You Give Up On Me" and "Daughters", a charity single for the association "Charity Water", that helps women working to get clean water. The album was Lissie's most critically acclaimed with an average grade of 73% on Metacritic.

== Critical reception ==
Professional ratings
Aggregate scores
Source	Rating
Metacritic	73/100
Review scores
Source	Rating
American Songwriter	3/5 stars
The Boston Globe	3.5/5 stars
Paste Magazine	(8/10)
Pitchfork	(5.8/10)
The Guardian	4/5 stars

My Wild West received generally favorable reviews, with several critics considering it as her best album. Metacritic gave an average score of 73, based on 13 reviews.

The Q magazine said it was "undoubtedly her best album yet" and gave 4 stars for the record.

The Fort Worth Star Telegram called it the 10th best album of 2016.

French paper "Marie Claire" wrote "My Wild West is primed to be a ray of light amidst the doldrums of winter". Meanwhile, "The Guardian" describes the album in these words : "My Wild West has a west-coast pop sheen to it, but touches of acoustic guitar and banjo suggest a country feel. This contrast mirrors the album’s theme".

== Track listing ==
No.	Title	Writer(s)	Length
1.	"My Wild West Overture"	Elisabeth Maurus	1:14
2.	"Hollywood"	Maurus, Martin Craft	3:41
3.	"Wild West"	Maurus, Curt Schneider	3:50
4.	"Hero"	Maurus, Schneider	3:32
5.	"Sun Keeps Risin'"	Maurus, Craft	4:27
6.	"Don't You Give Up on Me"	Maurus, Craft	4:15
7.	"Stay"	Maurus	3:29
8.	"Daughters"	Maurus, Angelo Petraglia	4:17
9.	"Together or Apart"	Maurus	3:52
10.	"Shroud"	Maurus, Petraglia	3:16
11.	"Go for a Walk"	Maurus	3:27
12.	"Ojai"	Maurus, Jim Irvin, Julian Emery	3:35

== Charts ==
Chart (2016)	Peak position
Belgian Albums (Ultratop Wallonia)	193
German Albums (Offizielle Top 100)	80
Norwegian Albums (VG-lista)	9
Scottish Albums (Official Charts)	13
Swiss Albums (Schweizer Hitparade)	46
UK Albums (Official Charts)	16
UK Independent Albums (Official Charts)	2
US Billboard 200	171
US Top Alternative Albums (Billboard)	13
US Top Rock Albums (Billboard)	18
US Heatseekers Albums (Billboard)	1
US Independent Albums (Billboard)	8
US Americana/Folk Albums (Billboard)	5
