= Lissie =

American singer-songwriter

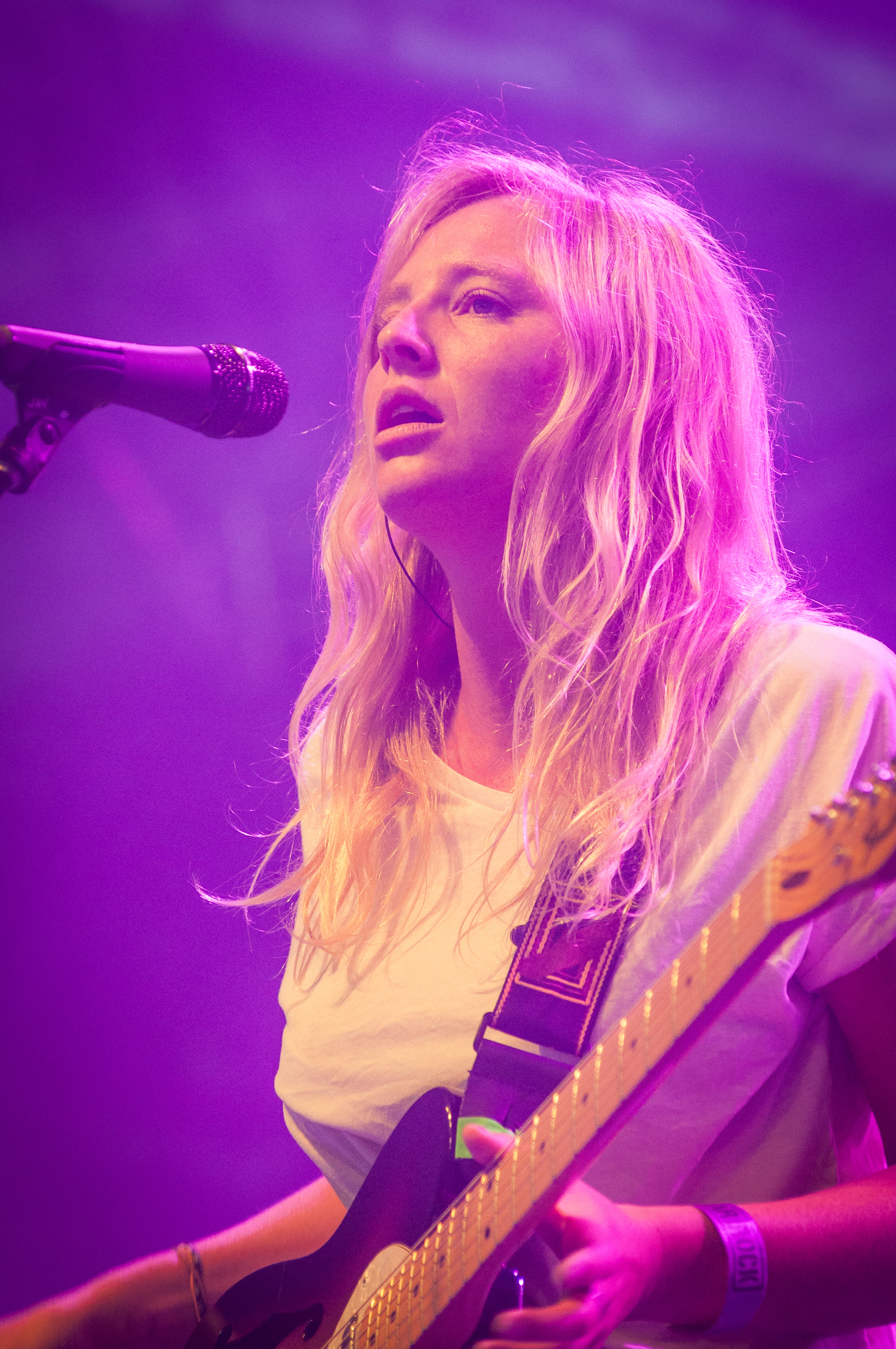
- Lissie performing in July 2013

Background information
- Born: Elisabeth Corrin Maurus; November 21, 1982 (age 43); Rock Island, Illinois, U.S.
- Genres: Rock; pop; country; folk
- Occupation: Singer-songwriter
- Instruments: Vocals; guitar
- Years active: 2006–present
- Labels: Cooking Vinyl; Columbia; Fat Possum
- Website: lissie.com

Elisabeth Corrin Maurus (born November 21, 1982), known professionally as Lissie, is an American singer-songwriter. Her debut extended play (EP), Why You Runnin' (2009), led her to sign with Columbia Records to release her debut studio album, Catching a Tiger (2010). Her second album and final release on a major label, Back to Forever (2013), was followed by her critically acclaimed-third album, My Wild West (2016), and later her fourth and fifth albums Castles (2018) and Carving Canyons (2022).

== Early life ==
Lissie was born Elisabeth Corrin Maurus, the youngest of four children and raised in Rock Island, Illinois. Her father is a physician and her mother, who is of Swedish ancestry, is an interior designer. She was interested in singing and music from an early age. She played the title role of the musical Annie at the age of nine. "In high school it seems like everyone has more drama than any other time in their life. So that was the time in my life where I really leaned on music as a way to stay sane," she said in an interview.

In her senior year of high school, she was expelled over what she described as "something stupid that I did, but it was sort of like the culmination of just a lot of negative things that had happened". She got her diploma at an alternative outreach center. She spent two years at Colorado State University in Fort Collins, during which time she would open for musicians who visited the city. She collaborated with DJ Harry of SCI Fidelity Records on the song "All My Life", which was featured on television shows House, The O.C., Veronica Mars and Wildfire. After spending a semester in Paris, she finished her studies to pursue a career in music. In 2007, she produced a four-song EP that received some airplay on KCRW's Morning Becomes Eclectic.

== Career ==
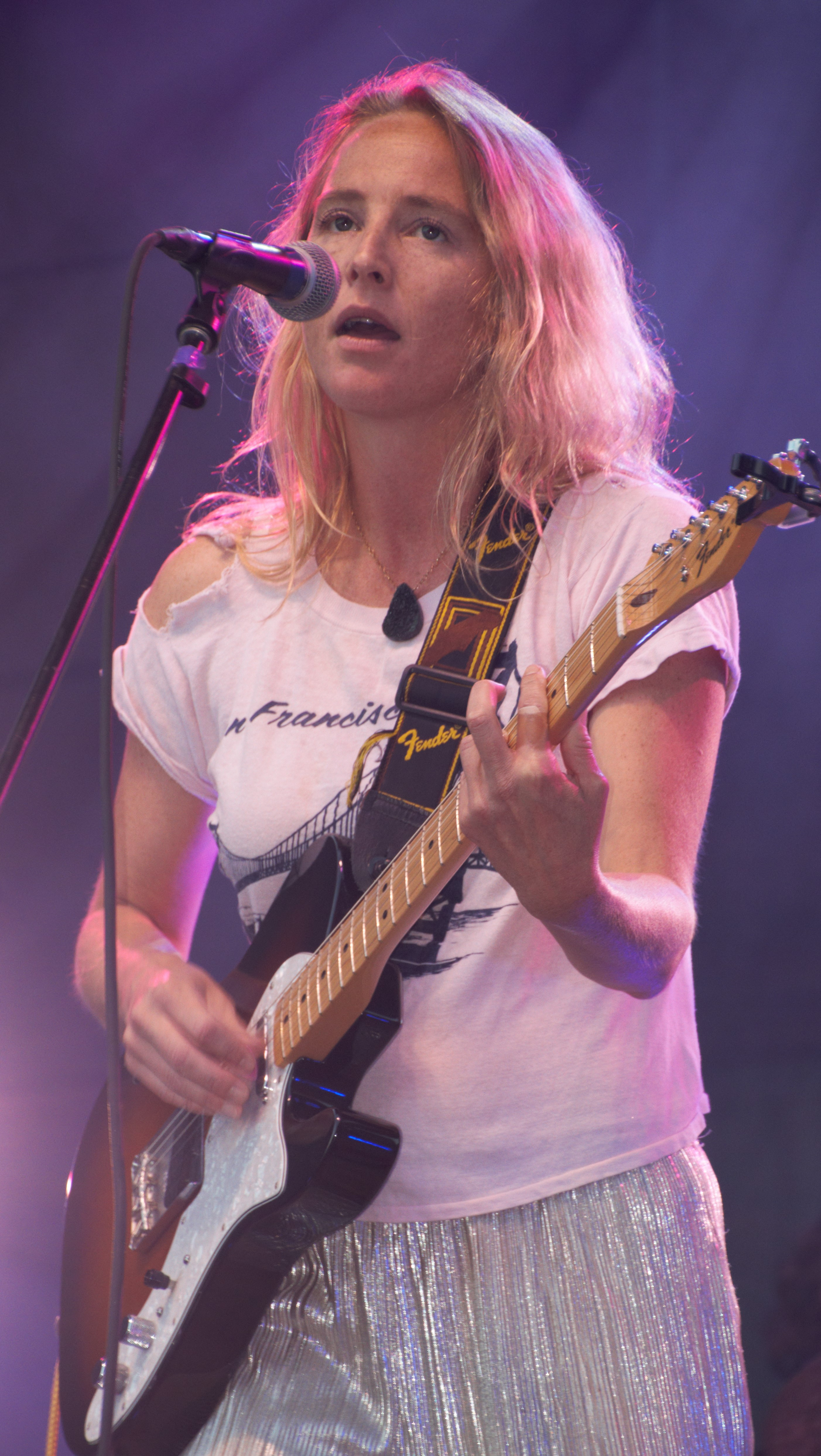
Lissie playing guitar in 2018

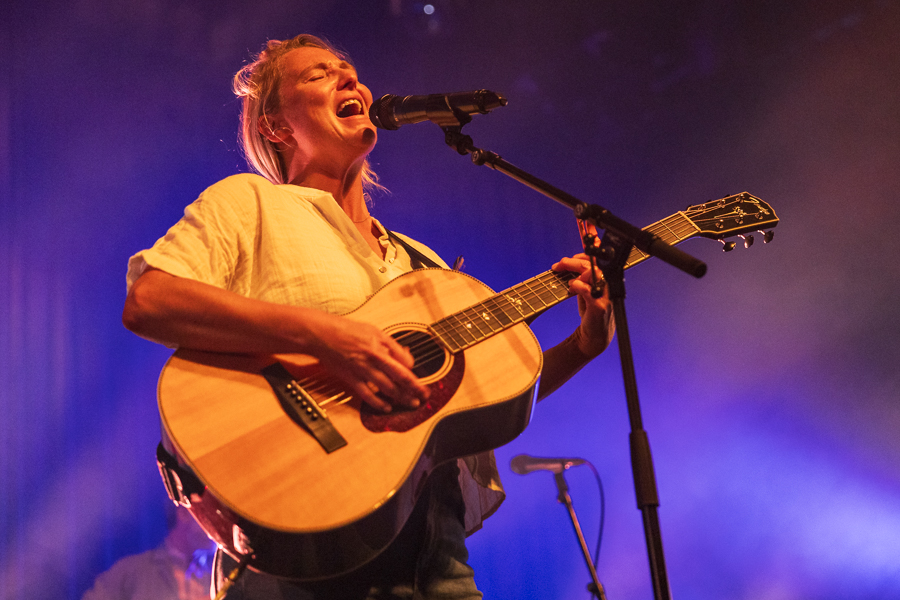
Lissie performing at Rockefeller, Oslo in 2023

In early 2008, Lenny Kravitz invited her to be the opening act for his Love Revolution Tour, after a friend tipped him about her MySpace page. Later that year, "The Longest Road", a song she co-wrote with DJ Morgan Page reached No. 4 on Billboard's Hot Dance Club Songs chart. "We met under that idea that he was going to remix a song of mine ... But we decided to work on a new song together", she told the Quad-City Times. The Deadmau5 remix of the track was nominated for a Grammy in the "Best Remixed Recording, Non-Classical" category.

Her EP, Why You Runnin', produced by Bill Reynolds of Band of Horses, was released in November 2009 on Fat Possum. One of the songs, "Oh Mississippi" was co-written with Ed Harcourt, whom she met through a mutual friend. The EP was listed amongst Paste magazine's "Eight Most Auspicious Musical Debuts of 2009". In early 2010, she toured various venues in the United Kingdom supporting Ohio-born singer-songwriter Joshua Radin.

Lissie signed with Sony Music UK's Columbia Records. Her debut album, Catching a Tiger, was released on 21 June 2010. The album was recorded in Nashville in 2009 and produced by Jacquire King. The first single from the album, "In Sleep", was selected as Track of The Day by Q on 13 March 2010. A second single, "When I'm Alone," was released alongside the album; it would later be chosen by iTunes UK as their song of the year 2010.

In August 2010, her single "Cuckoo" was voted overwhelmingly to be the Record of the Week by listeners of expat radio station Heart FM Spain (www.heartfmspain.com), as a result of listener feedback, Lissie and the album "Catching A Tiger" were featured throughout the week of August 23 to 27. The single was also added to the "A" level playlist on BBC Radio 2 giving it around twenty plays a week on the UK's most popular station. The Cuckoo EP includes Lissie's live version of "Bad Romance" by Lady Gaga, which became popular online before being included on the release.

Lissie is featured on at least 4 tracks on Snow Patrol's album Fallen Empires, released in November 2011.

Her cover of Fleetwood Mac's "Go Your Own Way" found prominence in early 2012, when it was used in a Twinings advert and in the film Safe Haven. The song was also used as a theme for the BBC Radio 4 reading of Iain Banks's Stonemouth, read by David Tennant. The song was also featured in the closing moments of the first-season finale for "Good Behavior" in 2017. In 2019, it was featured in Season 1, Episode 3 of the tv series "A Discovery of Witches".

On 4 November 2015, she announced the released date for her new album, My Wild West, as 12 February 2016.

She performed her song "Wild West" in Part 14 of the third season of Twin Peaks.

In season 3 of the TV show Loudermilk that was released in 2020, she played a fictional character called Lizzie Poole who used to be a singer-songwriter in a band called Pool, but gave that career up after a negative review written by the title character, Sam Loudermilk, played by Ron Livingston. The songs that character performs in the show are previously released Lissie songs, including "When I'm Alone."

== Personal life ==
Lissie lives on a farm in northeast Iowa, moving there from Ojai, California, in 2015. She is a fan of fantasy literature, citing His Dark Materials and the Harry Potter series as favorites.

== Discography ==
- Catching a Tiger (2010)
- Back to Forever (2013)
- My Wild West (2016)
- Castles (2018)
- Carving Canyons (2022)
