= Silverchair discography =

Band discography

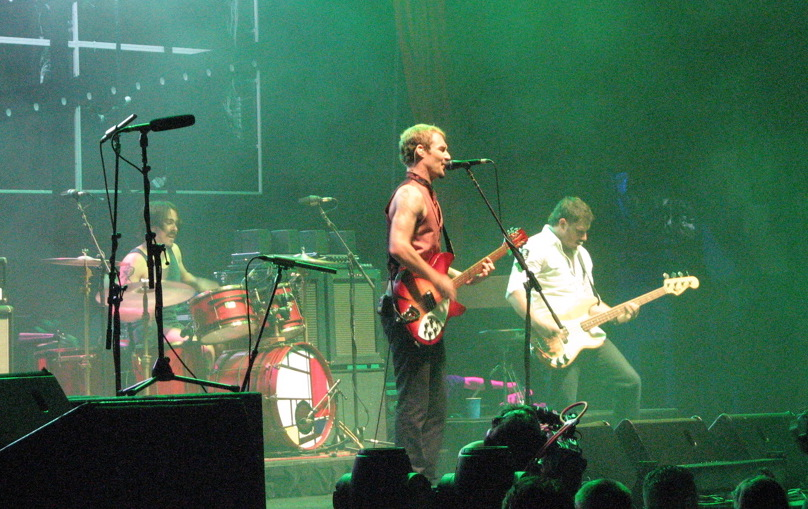
- Silverchair performing at the Across the Great Divide tour with Powderfinger in September 2007.
- Studio albums: 5
- Extended plays: 1
- Live albums: 1
- Compilation albums: 2
- Singles: 20
- B-sides: 57
- Video albums: 4
- Music videos: 20

The discography of Silverchair, an Australian alternative rock band, consists of five studio albums, one extended play (EP), twenty singles, one live album, two compilation albums, four video albums, and twenty music videos.

Silverchair's first single, "Tomorrow", was highly successful upon its Australian release in 1994, and provided the band an opportunity to release their music internationally. Shortly after, they released their debut album; Frogstomp. Achieving success in the United States and performing around the world, Silverchair's band members continued with their school studies, and in 1997 released Freak Show. Following the success of 1999's Neon Ballroom, Silverchair toured worldwide, then announced a break following the termination of their contract with Sony. The band joined Eleven, a record label formed by their manager John Watson.

Silverchair returned to recording in June 2001, and released Diorama in 2002. Lead singer Daniel Johns suffered from reactive arthritis from late 2001 while the album was being mixed until early 2003 when his symptoms became light enough to tour again. A tour was attempted to promote the album in 2002 but in April of that year it had to be rescheduled to 2003 due to Daniel's failing health. and after the 2003 “Across The Night” tour, the band announced a hiatus. Silverchair reunited after Wave Aid in 2005, and released Young Modern in 2007. Silverchair went on an indefinite hiatus in May 2011.

== Albums ==
=== Studio albums ===
Title	Album details	Peak chart positions										Certifications (sales thresholds)
Title	Album details	AUS	AUT	CAN	FRA	GER	NZ	NOR	SWE	UK	US	Certifications (sales thresholds)
Frogstomp	Released: 27 March 1995; Label: Murmur; Formats: CD, CS, DL, LP, MD	1	—	10	—	73	2	30	—	49	9	ARIA: 6× Platinum; BPI: Silver; MC: 3× Platinum; RIAA: 2× Platinum; RMNZ: Platinum
Freak Show	Released: 3 February 1997; Label: Murmur; Formats: CD, CS, DL, LP, MD	1	22	2	20	42	8	29	53	38	12	ARIA: 3× Platinum; MC: Platinum; RIAA: Gold
Neon Ballroom	Released: 8 March 1999; Label: Murmur; Formats: CD, CS, DL, LP, MD	1	13	5	23	13	8	—	26	29	50	ARIA: 3× Platinum; BPI: Silver; MC: Platinum; RIAA: Gold; RMNZ: Platinum
Diorama	Released: 31 March 2002; Label: Eleven; Formats: CD, CS, DL, LP	1	13	—	116	12	7	—	—	91	91	ARIA: 3× Platinum
Young Modern	Released: 31 March 2007; Label: Eleven; Formats: CD, CS, DL, LP	1	—	25	—	—	8	—	—	—	70	ARIA: 3× Platinum
"—" denotes a recording that did not chart or was not released in that territory.

=== Live albums ===
Title	Album details	Peak chart positions	Certifications (sales thresholds)
Title	Album details	AUS	Certifications (sales thresholds)
Live from Faraway Stables	Released: 10 November 2003; Label: Eleven; Formats: CD, DL, DVD	13	ARIA: Gold

=== Compilations ===
Title	Album details	Peak chart positions		Certifications (sales thresholds)
Title	Album details	AUS	NZ	Certifications (sales thresholds)
The Best of Volume 1	Released: 13 November 2000; Label: Murmur; Formats: CD, DL	16	29	ARIA: 3× Platinum
Rarities 1994–1999	Released: 12 December 2002; Label: Murmur; Formats: CD, DL	—	—	
"—" denotes a recording that did not chart or was not released in that territory.

=== Box sets ===
Title	Album details
The Freak Box	Released: 4 February 1997; Label: Sony; Formats: CD
The Diorama Box	Released: 1 December 2002; Label: Eleven; Formats: CD

== Extended plays ==
List of extended plays
Title	EP details
Tomorrow	Released: 16 September 1994; Label: Murmur; Format: CD, 7"

== Singles ==
Title	Year	Peak chart positions										Certifications	Album
Title	Year	AUS	CAN	CAN Alt	GER	NZ	SWE	UK	UK Rock	US Alt	US Main	Certifications	Album
"Tomorrow"	1994	1	42	1	—	1	—	59	—	1	1	ARIA: 4× Platinum; RMNZ: Platinum	Frogstomp
"Pure Massacre"	1995	2	—	13	—	2	—	71	—	17	12	ARIA: Platinum	Frogstomp
"Israel's Son"	1995	11	—	—	—	12	—	—	—	—	39	ARIA: Gold	Frogstomp
"Shade"	1995	28	—	24	—	47	—	—	—	—	—		Frogstomp
"Freak"	1997	1	55	12	—	23	—	34	1	29	25	ARIA: 2× Platinum	Freak Show
"Abuse Me"	1997	9	7	1	—	44	—	40	—	4	4	ARIA: Gold	Freak Show
"Cemetery"	1997	5	—	—	—	—	—	—	—	—	—	ARIA: Gold	Freak Show
"The Door"	1997	25	—	—	—	—	—	—	—	—	—		Freak Show
"Anthem for the Year 2000"	1999	3	—	6	—	8	36	93	3	12	15	ARIA: Platinum	Neon Ballroom
"Ana's Song (Open Fire)"	1999	14	—	—	—	34	42	45	2	12	28	ARIA: Platinum	Neon Ballroom
"Miss You Love"	1999	17	—	—	—	43	52	—	10	—	—	ARIA: Gold	Neon Ballroom
"The Greatest View"	2002	3	— (Note: "The Greatest View" did not enter the Canadian Singles Chart, but peaked at number 4 on the Hot Canadian Digital Songs chart.)	—	83	4	—	85	11	36	—	ARIA: Gold	Diorama
"Without You"	2002	8	34	—	—	—	—	—	—	—	—		Diorama
"Luv Your Life"	2002	20	—	—	—	—	—	187	38	—	—		Diorama
"Across the Night"	2003	24	—	—	—	—	—	—	—	—	—		Diorama
"Straight Lines"	2007	1	—	—	—	11	—	—	—	12	—	ARIA: 2× Platinum; RMNZ: Platinum	Young Modern
"Reflections of a Sound"	2007	—	—	—	—	—	—	—	—	—	—		Young Modern
"If You Keep Losing Sleep"	2007	16	—	—	—	—	—	—	—	—	—		Young Modern
"Mind Reader"	2008	—	—	—	—	—	—	—	—	—	—		Young Modern
"—" denotes a recording that did not chart or was not released in that territory.

=== Promotional singles ===
Title	Year	Album
"Findaway"	1995	Frogstomp
"No Association"	1996	Freak Show
"Paint Pastel Princess"	2000	Neon Ballroom
"Punk Song 2"	2000	The Best of Volume 1
"Tuna in the Brine"	2002	Diorama
"After All These Years"	2002	Diorama
"Pins in My Needles" (Note: "Pins in My Needles" and "Hollywood" were issued separately on music platforms in December 2020 as "Warner Archive" releases. Both were originally released as B-sides from the Diorama album in 2002, with "Pins in My Needles" appearing as the B-side to "The Greatest View" and "Hollywood" as the B-side to "Without You".)	2020	Non-album singles
"Hollywood"	2020	Non-album singles

== B-sides ==
Year	Title	Notes	From single
1994	"Acid Rain"		"Tomorrow"
1994	"Blind"		"Tomorrow"
1994	"Stoned"		"Tomorrow"
1995	"Faultline"	Live in Newcastle, 21 October 1994	"Pure Massacre"
1995	"Stoned"	Live in Newcastle, 21 October 1994	"Pure Massacre"
1995	"Blind"	Live	"Israel's Son"
1995	"Leave Me Out"	Live	"Israel's Son"
1995	"Undecided"	Live	"Israel's Son"
1995	"Madman"	Vocal Mix	"Shade"
1995	"Israel's Son"	Live	"Shade"
1995	"Findaway"	Live at Triple J wireless	"Findaway"
1997	"New Race"		"Freak"
1997	"Punk Song #2"		"Freak"
1997	"Undecided"	The Masters Apprentices cover	"Abuse Me"
1997	"Freak (Remix for Us Rejects)"		"Abuse Me"
1997	"Slab"	Nicklaunoise mix	"Cemetery"
1997	"Cemetery"	Acoustic	"Cemetery"
1997	"Surfin' Bird"		"The Door"
1997	"Roses"	Live	"The Door"
1997	"Minor Threat"	Live	"The Door"
1997	"Madman"	Live	"The Door"
1999	"London's Burning"		"Anthem for the Year 2000"
1999	"Untitled"		"Anthem for the Year 2000"
1999	"The Millennium Bug"	Paul Mac remix	"Anthem for the Year 2000"
1999	"Trash"		"Ana's Song (Open Fire)"
1999	"Anthem for the Year 2000"	A cappella version	"Ana's Song (Open Fire)"
1999	"Ana's Song (Open Fire)"	Acoustic	"Ana's Song (Open Fire)"
1999	"Wasted"		"Miss You Love"
1999	"Fix Me"		"Miss You Love"
1999	"Minor Threat"		"Miss You Love"
1999	"Ana's Song (Open Fire)"	Live video	"Miss You Love"
2000	"Ana's Song (Open Fire)"	Acoustic remix	"Paint Pastel Princess"
2002	"Pins in My Needles"		"The Greatest View"
2002	"Too Much of Not Enough"		"The Greatest View"
2002	"Asylum"		"Without You"
2002	"Hollywood"		"Without You"
2002	"Ramble"		"Without You"
2002	"The Greatest View"	Live on Rove Live	"Luv Your Life"
2002	"Without You"	Live on Rove Live	"Luv Your Life"
2002	Rove Live interview with Daniel Johns	Audio	"Luv Your Life"
2002	Rove Live interview with Daniel Johns	Video	"Luv Your Life"
2003	"Tuna in the Brine"	Demo	"Across the Night"
2003	"One Way Mule"	Demo	"Across the Night"
2003	"Luv Your Life"	Demo	"Across the Night"
2003	"Across the Night"	Demo	"Across the Night"
2003	"Across the Night"	Van Dyke Parks remix	"After All These Years"
2003	"Tuna in the Brine"	Van Dyke Parks remix	"After All These Years"
2003	Band interviews		"After All These Years"
2007	"All Across the World"		"Straight Lines"
2007	"Sleep All Day"	Demo	"Straight Lines"
2007	"I Don't Wanna Be the One"	Live	"Straight Lines"
2007	"Straight Lines"	Live at Carriageworks Album Launch	"Reflections of a Sound"
2007	"Mind Reader"	Live at Carriageworks Album Launch	"Reflections of a Sound"
2007	"Luv Your Life"	Live at Carriageworks Album Launch – iTunes only	"Reflections of a Sound"
2007	"We're Not Lonely But We Miss You"		"If You Keep Losing Sleep"
2007	"Barbarella"		"If You Keep Losing Sleep"
2007	"Hide Under Your Tongue"	iTunes only	"If You Keep Losing Sleep"
2008	"Mind Reader"	Live on Across the Great Divide tour	"Mind Reader"

== Soundtrack appearances ==
Year	Song	Appearance	Notes	Reference
1994	"Blind"	Triple J: Eleven – A Very Loud Compilation	Original version	
1995	"Stoned"	"Mallrats" soundtrack	"Tomorrow" B-Side, new vocal track	
1996	"Blind"	The Cable Guy soundtrack	Re-recorded version	
1997	"Spawn"	Spawn soundtrack	(Duet with Vitro)	
1997	"Untitled"	Godzilla soundtrack	"Anthem for the Year 2000" B-side	
1999	"Freak"	Much at Edgefest 1999	Edgefest 1999 live performance	
1999	"London's Burning"	Burning London: The Clash Tribute compilation	"Anthem for the Year 2000" B-side	
1999	"Anthem for the Year 2000"	WBCN Naked 2000 compilation	Neon Ballroom album version	
2000	"Punk Song #2"	Scary Movie soundtrack	"Freak" B-side	
2005	"Israel's Son"	WaveAid DVD	WaveAid live performance	
2005	"Without You"	WaveAid DVD	WaveAid live performance	
2005	"Ana's Song (Open Fire)"	WaveAid DVD	WaveAid live performance	
2005	"The Greatest View"	WaveAid DVD	WaveAid live performance	
2005	"The Door"	WaveAid DVD	WaveAid live performance	
2006	"Tomorrow"	ARIA Awards 20th Anniversary CD	Frogstomp album version	

== Videography ==
=== Music videos ===
Year	Title	Director	Notes	Reference
1994	"Tomorrow"	Robert Hambling	Produced by Nomad, a music video show on SBS.	
1995	"Pure Massacre"	Robert Hambling	Filmed live at the Phoenician Club in Sydney on 12 December 1994.	
1995	"Tomorrow"	Mark Pellington	US version.	
1995	"Shade"	Robert Hambling	Filmed at NSN Studios, Newcastle on 24 May 1995.	
1996	"Israel's Son"	Nigel Dick	Filmed at Rancho Maria, Canyon Country on 19 December 1995.	
1997	"Abuse Me"	Nick Egan		
1997	"Freak"	Gerald Casale	Filmed in Los Angeles in December 1996.	
1997	"Cemetery"	Gerald Casale		
1999	"Anthem for the Year 2000"	Gavin Bowden	Filmed on 23 January 1999 at Martin Place Amphitheatre, Sydney.	
1999	"Ana's Song (Open Fire)"	Cate Anderson		
1999	"Miss You Love"	Cate Anderson	The band's first music video in which they did not play their instruments.	
2000	"Emotion Sickness"	Cate Anderson	The band's first music video in which they did not appear.	
2002	"The Greatest View"	Sean Gilligan; Sarah-Jane Woulahan		
2002	"Without You"	Sean Gilligan; Sarah-Jane Woulahan		
2002	"Luv Your Life"	Steve Scott; James Littlemore	The band's first animated video clip.	
2003	"Across the Night"	Sean Gilligan; Sarah-Jane Woulahan	Featuring Guy Pearce.	
2003	"After All These Years"	Robert Hambling		
2007	"Straight Lines"	Paul Goldman; Alice Bell	Filmed at Olympic Park railway station in central Sydney.	
2007	"Reflections of a Sound"	Damon Escott; Stephen Lance		
2007	"If You Keep Losing Sleep"	Damon Escott; Stephen Lance		

=== Live DVDs ===
Title	Album details	Certifications
Live from Faraway Stables	Released: 10 November 2003; Label: Eleven; Formats: DVD	
Across the Great Divide Tour	Released: 1 December 2007; Label: Universal Music Australia; Format: DVD	ARIA: 2× Platinum

=== Documentaries and compilations ===
Title	Album details	Certification
Across the Night – Creation of Diorama	Released: 2002; Label: Eleven; Formats: DVD	ARIA: Gold
The Best of Volume 1: Complete Videography (Plus Emotion Pictures)	Released: 26 January 2004; Label: Sony; Format: DVD	ARIA: Platinum

== See also ==
- List of Silverchair awards – full listing of all awards won by the group.
