= List of awards and nominations received by Silverchair =

Silverchair awards and nominations
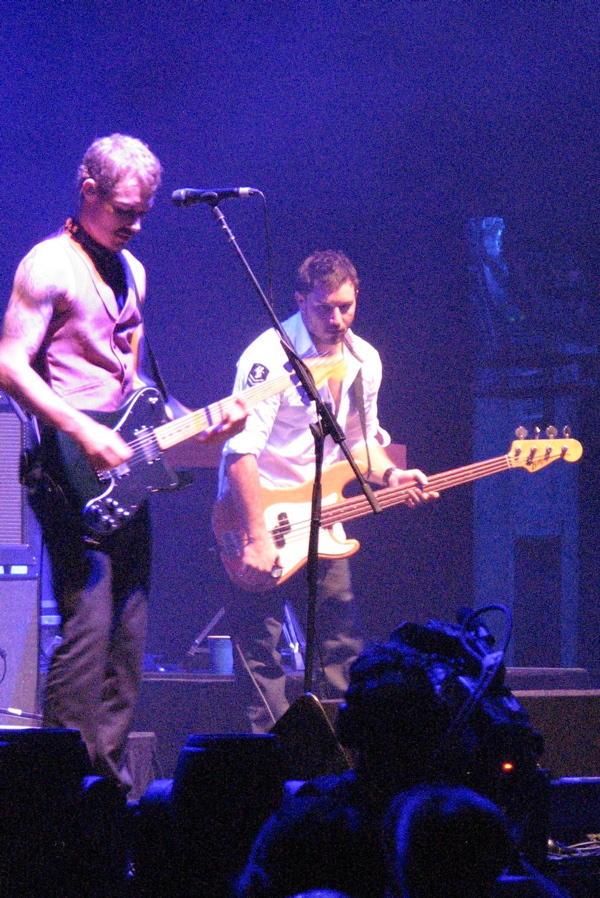
- Silverchair performing at the Across the Great Divide Tour in 2007
Awards and nominations
Award	Wins	Nominations
APRA	6	10
ARIA	21	49
Jack	2	4
MTV VMA	3	7
World Music	2	4
Rolling Stone	4	9
Drum Media	2	4
Chart	1	1
Triple J Hottest 100 (Note: The number of awards indicate the number of times Silverchair has appeared in any Triple J Hottest 100 chart.)	17	17

Totals (Note: Certain award groups do not simply award one winner. They acknowledge several different recipients, have runners-up, and have third place. Since this is a specific recognition and is different from losing an award, runner-up mentions are considered wins in this award tally. For simplification and to avoid errors, each award in this list has been presumed to have had a prior nomination.)
- Wins: 40
- Nominations: 85

This is a list of awards and nominations received by Silverchair. The Australian rock band formed in 1994 in Newcastle, New South Wales, consisting of Daniel Johns (vocals and guitar), Chris Joannou (bass guitar) and Ben Gillies (drums). One of the most popular Australian bands, as of December 2013 Silverchair held the record for the most ARIA Music Awards won, with 21. The band has also won multiple awards in the Australian music industry including the APRA and Jack Awards. Silverchair has won a number of categories from notable music magazines. The band has scored 15 songs in the Triple J Hottest 100.

== ARIA Awards ==
The ARIA Music Awards have been held annually in Australia since their inception in 1987. Silverchair holds the record for the most nominations by a group, with 49, and the most wins by a group, with 21. Their breakthrough year was in 1995, winning five out of nine nominated awards, including Best New Talent, and Breakthrough Artist for both album and single categories.

All five of their studio albums were nominated for Album of the Year, but they failed to win until nominated for their fifth album in 2007. The band won Single of the Year and Highest Selling Single twice in 1995 and 2007, and won Best Group and Best Rock Album twice in 2002 and 2007. They have also won the award for Best Cover Art twice in 1997 and 2002, and Engineer of the Year thrice in 1998, 1999 and 2002. Silverchair's most successful year was in 2007, winning six awards.

Year	Award	Work	Result
1995	Single of the Year	"Tomorrow"	Won
1995	Highest Selling Single	"Tomorrow"	Won
1995	Best New Talent	Frogstomp	Won
1995	Breakthrough Artist - Album	Frogstomp	Won
1995	Breakthrough Artist - Single	"Tomorrow"	Won
1995	Album of the Year	Frogstomp	Nominated
1995	Song of the Year	"Tomorrow"	Nominated
1995	Best Group	Frogstomp	Nominated
1995	Best Alternative Release	Frogstomp	Nominated
1996	Outstanding Achievement Award	Silverchair	Won
1996	Best Group	"Blind"	Nominated
1997	Best Cover Art	Freak Show	Won
1997	Album of the Year	Freak Show	Nominated
1997	Highest Selling Single	"Abuse Me"	Nominated
1997	Highest Selling Single	"Freak"	Nominated
1997	Best Group	Freak Show	Nominated
1997	Producer of the Year	Freak Show	Nominated
1998	Engineer of the Year	"The Door"	Won
1999	Engineer of the Year	Neon Ballroom	Won
1999	Album of the Year	Neon Ballroom	Nominated
1999	Single of the Year	"Ana's Song (Open Fire)"	Nominated
1999	Highest Selling Single	"Anthem for the Year 2000"	Nominated
1999	Best Group	Neon Ballroom	Nominated
1999	Best Rock Album	Neon Ballroom	Nominated
1999	Producer of the Year	Neon Ballroom	Nominated
1999	Best Video	Paul Goldman and Alice Bell for "Ana's Song (Open Fire)"	Nominated
1999	Best Cover Art	Neon Ballroom	Nominated
2002	Best Group	Diorama	Won
2002	Best Rock Album	Diorama	Won
2002	Producer of the Year	Diorama	Won
2002	Engineer of the Year	Diorama	Won
2002	Best Cover Art	Diorama	Won
2002	Album of the Year	Diorama	Nominated
2002	Best Video	"The Greatest View"	Nominated
2003	Single of the Year	"Luv Your Life"	Nominated
2003	Highest Selling Album	Diorama	Nominated
2003	Best Group	"Across the Night"	Nominated
2003	Best Video	"Across the Night"	Nominated
2007	Album of the Year	Young Modern	Won
2007	Single of the Year	"Straight Lines"	Won
2007	Highest Selling Single	"Straight Lines"	Won
2007	Best Group	Young Modern	Won
2007	Best Rock Album	Young Modern	Won
2007	Best Video	"Straight Lines"	Won
2007	Highest Selling Album	Young Modern	Nominated
2007	Best Cover Art	Young Modern	Nominated
2008	Best Music DVD	"Across the Great Divide" (with Powderfinger)	Won
2008	Best Group	"If You Keep Losing Sleep"	Nominated
2008	Best Video	"If You Keep Losing Sleep"	Nominated

== APRA Awards ==
The APRA Awards are held annually since 1982, presented by the Australasian Performing Right Association. Silverchair has won six awards from ten nominations. After the 2008 APRA Awards, Daniel Johns became the first artist to win the Songwriter of the Year award three times.

Year	Award	Work/Artist	Result
1995	Songwriter of the Year	Daniel Johns and Ben Gillies	Won
1996	Most Performed Australian Work Overseas	"Tomorrow"	Won
2003	Songwriter of the Year	Daniel Johns	Won
2003	Song of the Year	"The Greatest View"	Nominated
2003	Song of the Year	"Without You"	Nominated
2003	Most Performed Australian Work	"The Greatest View"	Nominated
2004	Song of the Year	"Across the Night"	Nominated
2008	Song of the Year	"Straight Lines"	Won
2008	Most Played Australian Work	"Straight Lines"	Won
2008	Songwriter of the Year	Daniel Johns	Won

== EG Awards / Music Victoria Awards ==
The EG Awards (known as Music Victoria Awards since 2013) are an annual awards night celebrating Victorian music. They commenced in 2006.

Year	Nominee / work	Award	Result
2007	Young Modern	Best Album	Won
2007	"Straight Lines"	Best Song	Won

== Jack Awards ==
The Jack Awards are sponsored by Tennessee whiskey company Jack Daniel's, and are held annually since 2004. Silverchair was nominated for the first time in 2007, and won two awards from four nominations.

Year	Award	Artist	Result
2007	Best Male Performer	Daniel Johns	Won
2007	Best Drummer	Ben Gillies	Won
2007	Best Bassist	Chris Joannou	Nominated
2007	Best Dressed Performer	Daniel Johns	Nominated

== MTV Video Music Awards ==
Silverchair was awarded twice for MTV International Viewers' Choice Award, presented by MTV. MTV Australia later inaugurated the MTV Australia Video Music Awards, commencing in 2005. Silverchair was nominated for the first time in 2007 for two awards and won the newly introduced Video Vanguard Award.

Year	Presenter	Award	Work	Result
1997	MTV	International Viewer's Choice Award (MTV Australia)	"Freak"	Won
1998	MTV	International Viewer's Choice Award (MTV Australia)	"Cemetery"	Nominated
1999	MTV	International Viewer's Choice Award (MTV Australia)	"Anthem for the Year 2000"	Won
2002	MTV	International Viewer's Choice Award (MTV Australia)	"The Greatest View"	Nominated
2007	MTV Australia	Video Vanguard	—	Won
2007	MTV Australia	Best Group	"Straight Lines"	Nominated
2007	MTV Australia	Video of the Year	"Straight Lines"	Nominated

== Triple J Hottest 100 ==
The annual music poll Triple J Hottest 100 was inaugurated in 1989 and is based on the public votes of Australian youth radio station Triple J listeners. Silverchair has scored 17 songs in the Hot 100. Five songs by Silverchair entered the Top 100 in 2002, which at the time was the most number of entries in a single Hot 100 chart for an Australian artist.

Year	Song	Position
1994	"Tomorrow"	5
1997	"Freak"	13
1997	"The Door"	27
1998	"Untitled"	93
1999	"Ana's Song (Open Fire)"	15
1999	"Anthem for the Year 2000"	29
1999	"Miss You Love"	30
1999	"Emotion Sickness"	43
2000	"Paint Pastel Princess"	96
2002	"The Greatest View"	10
2002	"Without You"	25
2002	"Luv Your Life"	35
2002	"Across the Night"	62
2002	"World Upon Your Shoulders"	76
2007	"Straight Lines"	2
2007	"If You Keep Losing Sleep"	30
2007	"Reflections of a Sound"	80

In 1998, a poll was held known as the "Hottest 100 of all time", where the song choices were not limited to a particular year. "Tomorrow" was placed 59th on the list and "Abuse Me" was placed 83rd.

In 2025, a poll was held known as the "Hottest 100 of Australian songs", where any Australian song released prior to 19 January 2025 was eligible to be voted for. "Tomorrow" was placed 17th on the list, "Straight Lines" was placed 28th, and "Freak" was placed 72nd.

== Awards from magazines ==
Silverchair placed as the winner or runner-up for several categories in the April 2000 edition of the Australian Rolling Stone magazine, as polled by the readers of the magazine. Also in 2000, they placed highly in several categories in Drum Media and Chart magazines for their work in 1999.

Year	Award	Artist/Work	Result
Rolling Stone Australia
2000	Artist of the Year	Daniel Johns	Winner
2000	Best Male Performer	Daniel Johns	Winner
2000	Best Rock Artist	Silverchair	Winner
2000	Best Dressed	Daniel Johns	Winner
2000	Best Band	Silverchair	Runner-up
2000	Best Album	Neon Ballroom	Runner-up
2000	Best Single	"Ana's Song (Open Fire)"	Runner-up
2000	Best Tour	Neon Ballroom	Runner-up
2000	Comeback of the Year	Silverchair	Runner-up
Drum Media
2000	Favourite Australian Album of 1999	Neon Ballroom	#1
2000	Favourite Band/Act in the Whole Wide World	Silverchair	#1
2000	Favourite Australian Artist of 1999	Daniel Johns	#2
2000	Gig of the Year	Silverchair live at the Hordern	#3
Chart
2000	Best International Album of 1999	Neon Ballroom	#1

== Other awards and nominations ==
Silverchair won in the 1996 World Music Awards for World's Highest Selling Australian Group. After performing "Ana's Song (Open Fire)", Silverchair was awarded for Best Video for the song at Viva's Comet Awards, Cologne, Germany in 1999.

The group won Metal Edge magazine's 1995 Readers' Choice Award for Best New Band.

In 2002, the album Diorama was voted as Album of the Year by the listeners of the Australian youth radio station Triple J. Later in 2005, Triple J inaugurated the J Award, a single award given to the Australian Album of the Year. Silverchair were nominated were nominated in 2007 for Young Modern but lost out to The Panics - Cruel Guards

In addition, Channel V's Oz Artist of the Year is voted by the Australian public, and is awarded to the artist on the same day as the annual ARIA Award presentation events. Since its inauguration in 1997, Silverchair has won the Artist of the Year award for six consecutive years, from 1997 to 2002. Silverchair was also nominated for the award in 2007, but lost to Evermore.
