= Live from Faraway Stables =

- The original four-disc CD-sized packaging

Live album by Silverchair
- Released: 10 November 2003
- Recorded: 19 April 2003
- Venue: Newcastle Civic Theatre, Newcastle, Australia
- Genre: Post-grunge; alternative rock
- Length: 133:05
- Label: Eleven

Silverchair chronology
Rarities 1994–1999 (2002)	Live from Faraway Stables (2003)	Young Modern (2007)

Silverchair VHS/DVD video chronology
The Best Of: Volume 1 (2000)	Live from Faraway Stables (2003)	Across the Great Divide (2007)

Professional ratings
Review scores
Source	Rating
AllMusic	3.5/5 stars

Live from Faraway Stables is a 2003 live album and concert film by Australian rock band Silverchair. It was recorded at their concert held on 19 April 2003, at Newcastle Civic Theatre in the band's home-town of Newcastle, New South Wales, Australia, and was the second show to be held there during the band's Across the Night world tour of March to June 2003. It is Silverchair's first live release.

On all shows of the Across the Night tour, the concert was divided into two sets, which were introduced on the three large video screens above the stage as "Act 1" and "Act 2"; the respective CDs and DVDs in the album are labelled in the same manner. "Act 1", which showcased mainly quieter and more experimental material, was "dominated" by songs from the band's then-latest studio album, Diorama, and was marked by "grand orchestrated sections (replicated by two extra keyboards); dramatic flourishes, both vocally and instrumentally; [and] an almost parodic leap into prog rock's 'look at me, look at me' shifts of form and time." "Act 2", which consisted of heavier rock songs, saw the band "revert to more of a hard rock set-up, with the cabaret touches junked for less subtle, but brutally effective delivery."

The album spent three weeks on the Australian ARIA Charts, peaking at #13. It has been certified gold by the Australian Recording Industry Association. The original two-CD/two-DVD release was made available in both CD-sized and DVD-sized packaging.

== Track listing ==
The concert footage of songs listed on the audio CDs (Discs 1 and 2) appear on their corresponding DVDs (Discs 3 and 4). All songs were written by Daniel Johns, except for the "Overture" from "Act 2", which was written by Julian Hamilton.

=== "Act 1" – Disc 1 (audio CD)/Disc 3 (DVD) ===
1. "Overture" – 1:32
2. "After All These Years" – 4:33
3. "World Upon Your Shoulders" – 5:14
4. "Tuna in the Brine" – 5:27
5. "Luv Your Life" – 4:44
6. "Paint Pastel Princess" – 4:36
7. "Petrol & Chlorine" – 5:07
8. "Across the Night" – 5:25
9. "Ana's Song (Open Fire)" – 4:33
10. "Miss You Love" – 4:10
11. "Steam Will Rise" – 9:26

=== "Act 2" – Disc 2 (audio CD)/Disc 4 (DVD) ===
1. "Overture" – 0:55
2. "Emotion Sickness" – 9:30
3. "Without You" – 4:11
4. "Israel's Son" – 7:32
5. "Black Tangled Heart" – 4:25
6. "Do You Feel the Same?" – 4:32
7. "The Greatest View" – 5:08
8. "The Door" – 5:45
9. "Freak" – 5:12
10. "Anthem for the Year 2000" – 6:01
11. "One Way Mule" – 6:21
12. "Asylum" – 5:22
13. "The Lever" – 13:43

=== Bonus material (DVD) ===
- "Emotion Sickness" (Live in São Paulo)
- An Insight into Production
- Behind the scenes
- Photo gallery
- Sound Dolby Digital 5.1

== Personnel ==
- Daniel Johns – guitar, piano, vocals
- Chris Joannou – bass guitar
- Ben Gillies – drums
- Julian Hamilton – keyboard, backing vocals
- Stuart Hunter – keyboard, backing vocals
- Nick Launay – mixing
- David Davis – assistant mix engineering
- Chris Thompson – live recording engineering
- Steven Schram – live recording assistant engineering
- Don Bartley – mastering
- Andrew Lord – television director
- Ben Richardson – executive producer

== Release history ==
Australian release date	Label	Format	Packaging	Catalog
10 November 2003	Eleven	4 DISC SET (2-CD + 2-DVD) (original release)	CD-sized	ELEVENCD19
10 November 2003	Eleven	4 DISC SET (2-CD + 2-DVD) (original release)	DVD-sized	ELEVENDVD19
18 August 2007	Eleven	2-CD reissue	CD-sized	ELEVENCD75
18 August 2007	Eleven	2-DVD reissue	DVD-sized	ELEVENDVD75
28 August 2007	Virgin	2-CD reissue (retitled Live from Faraway Stables: Across the Great Divide Tour; different artwork)	CD-sized slipcase	VIR5059742.2

== Certification ==
Region	Certification	Certified units/sales
Australia (ARIA)	Gold	35,000^{^}
^{^} Shipments figures based on certification alone.
