= The Best Of: Volume 1 (Silverchair album) =

Greatest hits album by Silverchair
- Released: 13 November 2000
- Recorded: 1996–1998
- Genres: Grunge, alternative metal, alternative rock
- Length: 1:18:48, 1:18:34
- Labels: Sony (United States); Murmur (Australia)
- Producer: Nick Launay

Silverchair chronology
Neon Ballroom (1999)	The Best Of: Volume 1 (2000)	Diorama (2002)

Silverchair VHS/DVD chronology
Emotion Pictures (1999)	The Best Of: Volume 1 (Complete Videology) (2000)	Live from Faraway Stables (2003)

The Best Of: Volume 1 is the first compilation album by Australian rock band Silverchair, which was issued on 13 November 2000. It includes every single they had released up until that point, with the exception of "Shade". The album peaked at No. 15 on the ARIA Albums Chart.

In March 1999, after the release of Neon Ballroom, Silverchair's three-album contract with Murmur and Sony Music had ended. After leaving the label, Sony issued The Best Of: Volume 1 without the band's consent. Late in November 2000, Johns disavowed the compilation: "We thought about putting out ads in the street press to make people aware that we weren't endorsing it, but that would have blown the whole thing out of proportion ... If people want to buy it, they can buy it but I wouldn't buy it if I was a Silverchair fan." The second disc from the limited edition was later released in December 2002 as Rarities 1994–1999, an entirely new product with its own artwork.

Professional ratings
Review scores
Source	Rating
AllMusic	4/5 stars

== Track listing ==
=== Disc One: A-Sides ===
No.	Title	Writer(s)	Originally from	Length
1.	"Anthem for the Year 2000" (Remix)	Daniel Johns	Neon Ballroom (1999)	4:23
2.	"Freak"	Daniel Johns	Freak Show (1997)	3:47
3.	"Ana's Song (Open Fire)"	Daniel Johns	Neon Ballroom (1999)	3:43
4.	"Emotion Sickness"	Daniel Johns	Neon Ballroom (1999)	6:01
5.	"Israel's Son"	Daniel Johns	Frogstomp (1995)	5:20
6.	"Tomorrow"	Daniel Johns, Ben Gillies	Frogstomp (1995)	4:27
7.	"Cemetery"	Daniel Johns	Freak Show (1997)	4:03
8.	"The Door"	Daniel Johns	Freak Show (1997)	3:36
9.	"Miss You Love"	Daniel Johns	Neon Ballroom (1999)	4:01
10.	"Abuse Me"	Daniel Johns	Freak Show (1997)	4:02
11.	"Pure Massacre"	Daniel Johns, Ben Gillies	Frogstomp (1995)	4:33
Total length:				47:56

=== Disc Two: B-Sides ===
No.	Title	Writer(s)	Singles And Albums	Length
1.	"Untitled"	Daniel Johns	Anthem For The Year 2000 (Single) (1999)	3:30
2.	"New Race" (Radio Birdman Cover)	Deniz Tek	Freak (Single) (1997)	3:20
3.	"Trash"	Daniel Johns	Ana's Song (Open Fire) (Single) (1999)	2:46
4.	"Ana's Song (Open Fire)" (Acoustic Remix)	Daniel Johns	Ana's Song (Open Fire) (1999)	3:50
5.	"Madman" (Vocal Mix)	Daniel Johns	Frogstomp (20th Anniversary) (2015) and Shade (Single) (1995)	2:43
6.	"Blind"	Daniel Johns	Israel's Son (Single) (1995)	4:14
7.	"Punk Song #2"	Daniel Johns	The Best Of: Volume 1 (2000)	2:45
8.	"Wasted/Fix Me" (Black Flag Cover)	Greg Ginn, Keith Morris	Miss You Love (Single) (1999)	1:51
9.	"Minor Threat" (Minor Threat Cover)	Brian Baker, Ian MacKaye, Jeff Nelson, Lyle Preslar	Miss You Love (Single) (1999)	1:36
10.	"Freak" (Remix For Us Rejects)	Daniel Johns	Miss You Love (Single) (1999)	4:13
11.	"Spawn" (Pre-Vitro)	Daniel Johns, Ben Gillies	Spawn: The Album (1997) and Neon Ballroom (1999)	2:56
Total length:				33:48

Australian cassette MATTC109

Side one

1. "Anthem for the Year 2000"
2. "Freak"
3. "Ana's Song"
4. "Emotion Sickness"
5. "Israel's Son"
6. "Untitled"
7. "New Race"
8. "Trash"
9. "Ana's Song" (Acoustic Remix)
10. "Madman" (Vocal Mix)

Side two

1. "Tomorrow"
2. "Cemetery"
3. "The Door"
4. "Miss You Love"
5. "Abuse Me"
6. "Pure Massacre"
7. "Blind"
8. "Punk Song #2"
9. "Wasted/Fix Me"
10. "Minor Threat"
11. "Freak" (Remix)
12. "Spawn (Pre-Vitro)"

Original single disc version

1. "Anthem for the Year 2000" (Remix)
2. "Freak"
3. "Ana's Song (Open Fire)"
4. "Emotion Sickness"
5. "Israel's Son"
6. "Tomorrow"
7. "Cemetery"
8. "The Door"
9. "Miss You Love"
10. "Abuse Me"
11. "Pure Massacre"
12. "Untitled"
13. "New Race"
14. "Trash"
15. "Ana's Song (Open Fire) (Acoustic Remix)"
16. "Madman"
17. "Blind"
18. "Punk Song #2"
19. "Wasted/Fix Me"
20. "Minor Threat"
21. "Freak (Remix For Us Rejects)"
- There is also a version of the CD that contains the DVD of the best of with all the official Silverchair's videos.
- Silverchair's cover of "Surfin' Bird" appeared as a bonus track exclusively on the Special Limited Edition French version.

== DVD ==
The Best of Volume 1 – Complete Videology is both the last VHS and the first DVD made by Silverchair. It was issued by Sony without the authorization of the band, after the split of the band from the label. The complete videology chronicles Silverchair's videos over the years 1994–1999 from the Frogstomp, Freak Show and Neon Ballroom albums. The so-called videology shows the evolution of the band, along with some live performances filmed during the 1999 Neon Ballroom Tour.

=== Contents ===
==== VHS/DVD version track list ====
1. "Emotion Sickness"
2. "Miss You Love"
3. "Ana's Song (Open Fire)"
4. "Anthem for the Year 2000"
5. "Cemetery"
6. "Abuse Me"
7. "Freak"
8. "Israel's Son"
9. "Pure Massacre" (Australian version)
10. "Tomorrow"
11. "The Door" (Live at Melbourne Park)
12. "Paint Pastel Princess" (Live at Melbourne Park)
13. "Spawn Again" (Live at Melbourne Park)
14. "Pure Massacre" (U.S. version)
- The DVD also contains the remastered version of Emotion Pictures.

==== DVD+CD version track listing ====
1. Opening titles
2. "Emotion Sickness"
3. "Miss You Love"
4. "Ana's Song (Open Fire)"
5. "Anthem for the Year 2000"
6. "Cemetery"
7. "Abuse Me"
8. "Freak"
9. "Israel's Son"
10. "Pure Massacre"
11. "Tomorrow" (U.S. version)
12. "The Door" (Channel V)
13. "Paint Pastel Princess" (Channel V)
14. "Spawn Again" (Channel V)
15. "Pure Massacre" (Channel V)
16. "Anthem for the Year 2000" (snippet)
17. "Emotion Sickness" (snippet)
18. "Satin Sheets" (snippet)
19. "Miss You Love" (snippet)
20. "Ana's Song (Open Fire)" (snippet)
21. On tour video footage
22. Closing credits
- The track on the DVD that is called "On Tour Video Footage" is the previously released Emotion Pictures.

== Personnel ==
- Daniel Johns – vocals, guitars
- Ben Gillies – drums, percussion
- Chris Joannou – bass guitar

Additional personnel

- Paul Mac – keyboards
- Jim Moginie – keyboards

== Charts ==
=== Weekly charts ===
Chart (2000)	Peak position
Australian Albums (ARIA)	16
New Zealand Albums (RMNZ)	29

Chart (2001)	Peak position
Canadian Alternative Albums (Nielsen Soundscan)	21

=== Year-end charts ===
Chart (2000)	Position
Australian Albums (ARIA)	52

== Certifications ==
Region	Certification	Certified units/sales
Australia (ARIA)	3× Platinum	210,000^{‡}
New Zealand (RMNZ)	Gold	7,500^{^}
^{^} Shipments figures based on certification alone.^{‡} Sales+streaming figures based on certification alone.
