= Rarities 1994–1999 =

Compilation album by Silverchair
- Released: December 2002
- Recorded: 1994–98
- Genre: Grunge, skate punk, alternative rock
- Length: 33:46
- Label: Sony, Murmur
- Producer: Nick Launay

Silverchair chronology
Diorama (2002)	Rarities 1994–1999 (2002)	Live from Faraway Stables (2003)

Rarities 1994–1999 is the second compilation album from rock group Silverchair released in December 2002 by Murmur/Sony Music Entertainment. It was originally a limited edition bonus disc packaged with the compilation, The Best Of: Volume 1 (December 2000), and was issued as a separate budget-priced album when the two-disc version was discontinued in 2002. The 2002 version featured new Neon Ballroom-themed artwork. As with the earlier collection, the band was not involved in compiling the tracks, having left Sony in early 2000.

== Reception ==
Professional ratings
Review scores
Source	Rating
Allmusic	2/5 stars

AllMusic's Johnny Loftus rated Rarities 1994–1999 as two out of five and felt it was "non-essential" for fans or even casual listeners of Silverchair, preferring their earlier compilation, The Best of Volume 1, as a retrospective release.

== Track listing ==
Rarities 1994–1999 track listing
No.	Title	Length
1.	"Untitled" (originally from the "Anthem for the Year 2000" single)	3:30
2.	"New Race" (originally from the "Freak" single)	3:20
3.	"Trash" (originally from the "Anthem for the Year 2000" single)	2:46
4.	"Ana's Song (Open Fire) (acoustic remix)" (originally from the "Ana's Song (Open Fire)" single)	3:51
5.	"Madman (Vocal Version)" (originally from the "Shade" single)	2:43
6.	"Blind" (originally from the "Tomorrow" single. Re-recorded for The Cable Guy movie soundtrack)	4:14
7.	"Punk Song #2" (originally from the "Freak" single)	2:45
8.	"Wasted/Fix Me (Black Flag cover)" (originally from the "Miss You Love" single)	1:51
9.	"Minor Threat (Minor Threat cover)" (originally from the "Miss You Love" single)	1:36
10.	"Freak (Remix for Us Rejects)" (originally from the "Freak" single)	4:13
11.	"Spawn (Pre-Vitro Version)" (originally from the Spawn movie soundtrack)	2:57
Total length:		33:46
