= Cemetery (Silverchair song) =

Single by Silverchair

from the album Freak Show
- Released: 1997
- Studio: Festival (Sydney, Australia)
- Length: 4:06
- Label: Murmur
- Songwriter: Daniel Johns
- Producer: Nick Launay

Silverchair singles chronology
"Abuse Me" (1997)	"Cemetery" (1997)	"The Door" (1997)

"Cemetery" is a song by Australian rock band Silverchair. A ballad, the song was released as the third single from their second studio album, Freak Show (1997). It was included on the band's first compilation album, Best of Volume 1 (2000).

In their review for Freak Show, Rolling Stone called the song a "proggy" ballad.

== Covers ==
The song was covered by The Brave on the Silverchair tribute album Spawn (Again): A Tribute to Silverchair.

== Track listing ==
Australian CD single (MATTCD052)

- 12" ltd. promo vinyl (MATTV052)
  - Ltd. cassette (MATT0052)
1. "Cemetery"
2. "Slab" (Nicklaunoise mix)
3. "Cemetery" (acoustic)

European CD single (6645342)

1. "Cemetery"
2. "Freak (Remix for Us Rejects)"
3. "Undecided"

== Charts ==
Chart (1997)	Peak position
Australia (ARIA)	5

== Certifications ==
Region	Certification	Certified units/sales
Australia (ARIA)	Gold	35,000^{^}
^{^} Shipments figures based on certification alone.
