= Silverchair =

Australian rock band

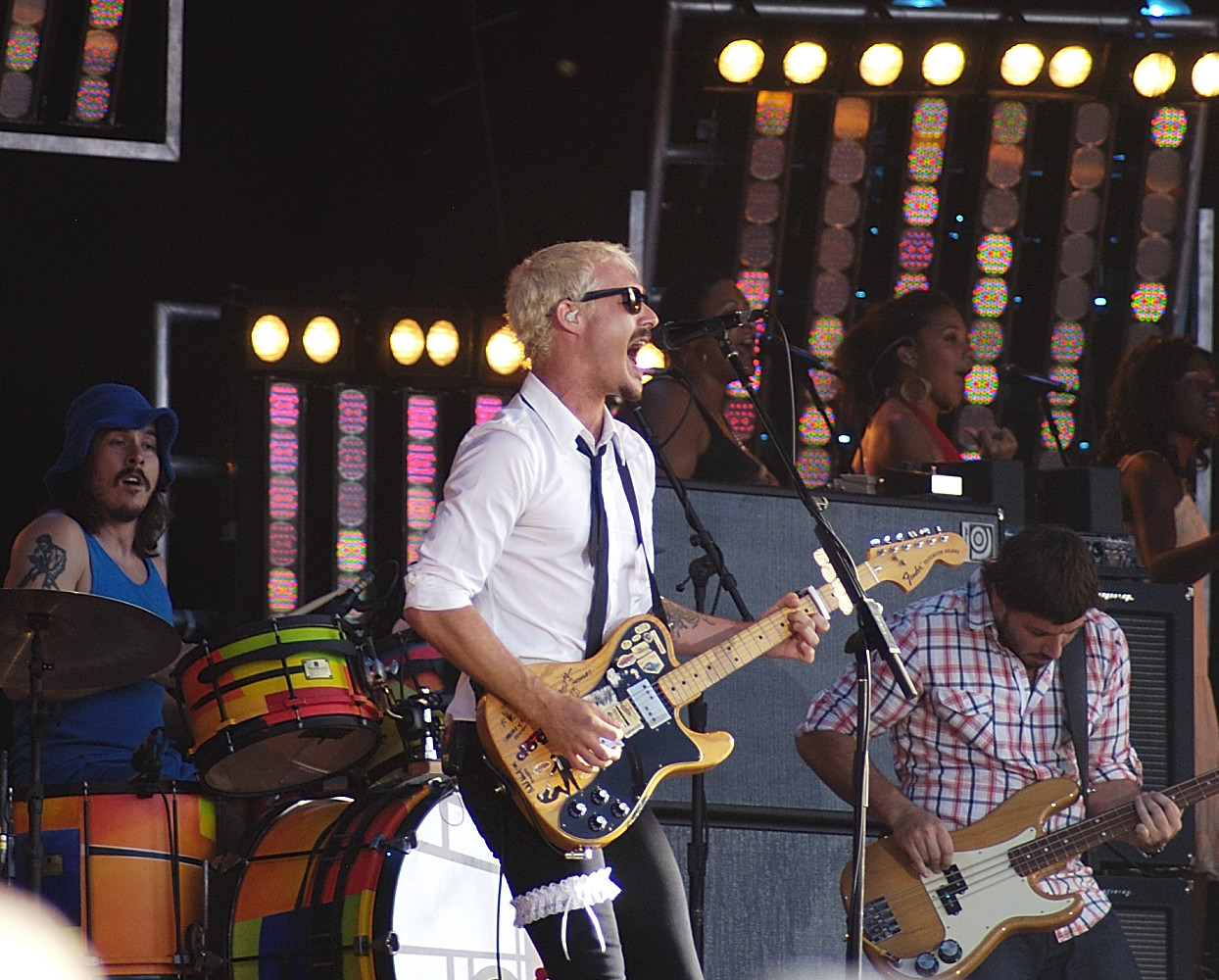
- Silverchair performing at the Big Day Out in 2008. Left to right: Ben Gillies, Daniel Johns and Chris Joannou

Background information
- Also known as: Innocent Criminals (1992–1994); The George Costanza Trio (1996); Short Elvis (1992, 2006)
- Origin: Newcastle, New South Wales, Australia
- Genres: Alternative rock; grunge; art rock; post-grunge
- Works: Silverchair discography
- Years active: 1992–2011
- Labels: Murmur; Sony; Epic; Eleven; Atlantic
- Spinoffs: The Dissociatives; Tambalane
- Past members: Daniel Johns; Ben Gillies; Chris Joannou
- Website: chairpage.com

Silverchair were an Australian rock band, which formed in 1992 as Innocent Criminals in Newcastle, New South Wales, with Daniel Johns on vocals and guitars, Ben Gillies on drums, and Chris Joannou on bass guitar. The group got their big break in mid-1994 when they won a national demo competition conducted by SBS TV show Nomad and ABC radio station Triple J. The band was signed by Murmur and were successful in Australia and internationally. Silverchair has sold over 10 million albums worldwide.

Silverchair have won more ARIA Music Awards than any other group in history, earning 21 wins from 49 nominations. They also received six APRA Awards, with Johns winning three songwriting awards in 2008. All five of their studio albums debuted at number one on the ARIA Albums Chart: Frogstomp (1995), Freak Show (1997), Neon Ballroom (1999), Diorama (2002), and Young Modern (2007). Three singles reached the number-one slot on the related ARIA Singles Chart: "Tomorrow" (1994), "Freak" (1997), and "Straight Lines" (2007).

Silverchair's alternative rock sound evolved throughout their career, with differing styles on specific albums growing more ambitious over the years, from grunge on their first two albums to later works displaying orchestral and art rock influences. Writers at 106.3 The Buzz consider Silverchair one of the "Big Four" of post-grunge. The songwriting and singing of Johns had evolved steadily while the band had developed an increased element of complexity.

In 2003, following the release of Diorama the previous year, Silverchair went on hiatus. The band reunited at the 2005 Wave Aid concerts; released their fifth album, Young Modern, in 2007; and played the Across the Great Divide tour with contemporaries Powderfinger. In May 2011, Silverchair announced an indefinite hiatus.

== History ==
=== 1994–1997: Formation and early grunge releases ===
Silverchair's founders, Ben Gillies and Daniel Johns, attended the same primary school in the Newcastle suburb of Merewether. At "age 11 or 12", singer-guitarist Johns and drummer Gillies rapped over an electronic keyboard's demo button under their first band name, The Silly Men. As teenagers, they started playing music together more prominently—in one class, they built a stage out of desks and played rap songs for their schoolmates. When they moved on to Newcastle High School, fellow student Chris Joannou joined the pair on bass guitar. In 1992, they formed Innocent Criminals with Tobin Finnane as a second guitarist but he left early 1994. He had planned on staying with Ben's family while his parents were away but choose to go to England with his parents. When he returned he was told the band wanted to be a trio. They played numerous shows around the Hunter Region in their early teens; their repertoire included cover versions of Led Zeppelin, Deep Purple, and Black Sabbath. In 1994, Innocent Criminals entered YouthRock—a national competition for school-based bands—and placed first ahead of older competition. The band recorded "the very first recordings of "Tomorrow", "Acid Rain", "I Felt Like It", "Won't You Be Mine", "Cicada" and "Pure Massacre" plus two cover versions, one of Led Zeppelin and one of The Cult", early in the year at Platinum Sound Studios.

In April, the band's mainstream breakthrough came when they won a national competition called Pick Me, using their demo of "Tomorrow". The competition was conducted by the SBS TV show Nomad and Australian Broadcasting Corporation (ABC) alternative radio station Triple J. As part of the prize, Triple J recorded the song and ABC filmed a video, which was aired on 16 June. For the video's broadcast, they had changed their name to Silverchair (styled as silverchair until 2002). In a 1994 interview with Melbourne magazine Buzz, the band claimed the name derived from a radio request for "Sliver" by Nirvana and "Berlin Chair" by You Am I being mixed up as Silver Chair. It was later revealed they were named for the C. S. Lewis–penned novel The Silver Chair from The Chronicles of Narnia series. Aside from Innocent Criminals, the band has used The George Costanza Trio and Short Elvis as aliases.

Following a bidding war between rival labels, Silverchair signed a three-album recording contract with Sony Music subsidiary Murmur Records. Initially, the group were managed by their parents. Sony A&R manager John Watson, who was jointly responsible for signing the group, subsequently left the label to become their band manager. In September, their Triple J recording of "Tomorrow" was released as a four-track extended play. From late October, it spent six weeks at number-one on the ARIA Singles Chart. In 1995, a re-recorded version of "Tomorrow" (and a new video) was made for the United States market, becoming the most played song on US modern rock radio that year.

Silverchair's debut album, Frogstomp, was recorded in nine days, with production by Kevin Shirley (Lime Spiders, Peter Wells) and released in March 1995. At the time of recording, the band members were 15 years old and still attending high school. Frogstomp's lyrical concepts were fiction-based, drawing inspiration from television, hometown tragedies, and perceptions of the pain of friends. The album was well received: AllMusic and Rolling Stone rated it in four and four-and-a-half stars, respectively, praising the intensity of the album, especially "Tomorrow".

Frogstomp was a number-one album in Australia and New Zealand. It reached the Billboard 200 Top 10, making Silverchair the first Australian band to do so since INXS. It was certified as a US double-platinum album by the RIAA, triple-platinum in Canada by the CRIA, and multi-platinum in Australia. The album sold more than 4 million copies worldwide. Paste magazine called this album the "last stand" of grunge. As Frogstomp and "Tomorrow" continued to gain popularity through 1995, the group toured the US, where they supported Red Hot Chili Peppers in June, the Ramones in September, and played on the roof of Radio City Music Hall at the MTV Music Awards. In September 1995, during Silverchair's tour in the United States, Johns was hit with a bottle of alcohol in Santa Monica, California while performing "Israel's Son" and the injury required half a dozen stitches near his left eyebrow. In between touring, they continued their secondary education in Newcastle. At the ARIA Music Awards of 1995, the band won five awards out of nine nominations. To collect their awards on the night, they sent Josh Shirley, the young son of the album's producer. At the ceremony, they performed Radio Birdman's "New Race" with Tim Rogers (of You Am I); in 2019, Dan Condon of Double J rated this as one of the "7 great performances from the history of the ARIA Awards." On 9 December 1995, Silverchair played "Pure Massacre" and "Tomorrow" on Saturday Night Live.

In a January 1996 murder case, the defendant counsel for Brian Bassett, 16, and Nicholaus McDonald, 18, of McCleary, Washington, claimed that the pair listened to "Israel's Son", from Frogstomp, which contributed to the 10 August 1995 murders of Bassett's parents and a younger brother. McDonald's lawyer cited the lyrics "Hate is what I feel for you/I want you to know that I want you dead" which were "almost a script. They're relevant to everything that happened". The band's manager, Watson, issued a statement that they did not condone nor intend any such acts of violence. Prosecutors rejected the defence case and convinced the jury that the murder was committed to "steal money and belongings and run off to California."

Silverchair began recording their second studio album, Freak Show, in May 1996 while experiencing the success of Frogstomp in Australia and the US. Produced by Nick Launay (Birthday Party, Models, Midnight Oil) and released in February 1997, the album reached number one in Australia and yielded three top-10 singles: "Freak", "Abuse Me", and "Cemetery". Its fourth single, "The Door", reached No. 25. The songs focused on the anger and backlash that the expectations of Frogstomp brought upon the band. Freak Show was certified gold in the US, 2× platinum in Australia, and global sales eventually exceeded 1.5 million copies.

=== 1997–2003: Artistic experimentation, critical and commercial success ===
By late 1997, the trio had completed their secondary education, and, from May 1998, they worked on their third album, Neon Ballroom, with Launay producing again. It was released in March 1999 and peaked at the number-one position in Australia. Australian rock music historian Ian McFarlane said, "As well as being the band's best album to date, it was universally acknowledged as one of the best albums of the year." The band originally intended to take a 12-month break, but in the end they decided to devote their time to making music. Neon Ballroom provided three Australian top-20 singles: "Anthem for the Year 2000", "Ana's Song (Open Fire)" and "Miss You Love"; a fourth single, "Paint Pastel Princess", did not reach the top 50. The albums charted well internationally: Freak Show reached No. 2 in Canada, and Neon Ballroom reached No. 5. Both reached the top 40 on the United Kingdom Albums Chart. "Abuse Me" reached No. 4 on Billboard's Hot Modern Rock Tracks and Hot Mainstream Rock Tracks charts. "Ana's Song (Open Fire)" peaked at No. 12 on the Hot Modern Rock Tracks.

In 1999, Johns announced that he had developed the eating disorder anorexia nervosa due to anxiety. Johns noted that the lyrics to "Ana's Song (Open Fire)" dealt with his disorder, where he would "eat what he needed ... to stay awake." He revealed that his eating problems developed from the time of Freak Show and when Neon Ballroom was written he "hated music, really everything about it", but he felt that he "couldn't stop doing it; I felt like a slave to it." Johns sought therapy and medication but felt "It's easier for me to express it through music and lyrics". During the process of recording Neon Ballroom, according to Gillies in an article by British publication The Guardian, "work" was used to describe the band by Johns.

Silverchair added an auxiliary keyboardist, Sam Holloway (ex-Cordrazine), for the Neon Ballroom Tour. The US leg had the group playing with The Offspring and Red Hot Chili Peppers, while Silverchair's tour of UK and European had The Living End as the support act. Rolling Stone's Neva Chonin attributed their chart success to the album's more "mature" sound. In Europe and South America it became the group's most successful album to date. The group appeared at festivals in Reading and Edgefest, amongst others. Following the tour, the band announced that they would be taking a 12-month break. Their only live performance in 2000 was at the Falls Festival on New Year's Eve. On 21 January 2001, the band played to 250,000 people at Rock in Rio, a show they described as the highlight of their career until that point.

After the release of Neon Ballroom, Silverchair's three-album contract with Sony Music had ended. The group eventually signed with Atlantic Records for North and South America, and they formed their own label with Watson, Eleven: A Music Company (distributed by EMI), for Australia and Asia. In November 2000, after the group had left the label, Sony issued The Best Of: Volume 1 without the band's involvement. Johns disavowed the compilation, saying, "We thought about putting out ads in the street press to make people aware that we weren't endorsing it, but that would have blown the whole thing out of proportion ... If people want to buy it, they can buy it[,] but I wouldn't buy it if I was a Silverchair fan."

"Luv Your Life"
"Luv Your Life" was typical of Johns's new-found method of writing songs on piano, and also featured an orchestral arrangement by Van Dyke Parks.

In June 2001, Silverchair entered a studio in Sydney with producer David Bottrill (Tool, Peter Gabriel, King Crimson) to start work on their fourth album, Diorama. Johns formally assumed the role of a co-producer. The album name means "a world within a world". Most tracks came from Johns' new-found method of writing material on a piano, a technique he developed during the band's break after Neon Ballroom.

In order to complete the vision for Diorama, several other musicians contributed to the album, including Van Dyke Parks, who provided orchestral arrangements to "Tuna in the Brine", "Luv Your Life", and "Across the Night". Paul Mac (from Itch-E and Scratch-E) and Jim Moginie (from Midnight Oil) both on piano also collaborated with the band. While recording Diorama, Johns referred to himself as an artist, rather than simply being in a "rock band". Upon its release, critics commented that the album was more artistic than previous works.

Early in December, the first single, "The Greatest View", was released to Australian radio networks. Its physical release in January 2002 coincided with the band's appearance on the Big Day Out tour. Early in 2002, Johns was diagnosed with reactive arthritis, which made it difficult for him to play the guitar, and subsequent performances supporting the album's release were cancelled. In March 2002, Diorama was issued and topped the ARIA Albums Chart; it became their fourth number-one album and spent 50 weeks in the top 50.

Four singles were released from the album: "The Greatest View", "Without You", "Luv Your Life" and "Across the Night"; "The Greatest View" charted highest, reaching No. 3. In October, Silverchair were successful at the ARIA Music Awards of 2002, winning five awards, including 'Best Rock Album' and 'Best Group', and 'Producer of the Year' for Johns. The band played "The Greatest View" at the ceremony; the song was also nominated for 'Best Video'. Two singles (and a related video) were nominated for further ARIA Awards in 2003. Following the 2002 ARIA Awards, the band announced their first indefinite hiatus. Johns said it was necessary "given the fact the band were together for over a decade and yet were only, on average, 23 years old". From March to June 2003, Silverchair undertook the Across the Night Tour to perform Diorama. Their hometown performance on 19 April was recorded as Live from Faraway Stables for a 2-CD and 2-DVD release in November. After the tour finished in June, the group announced another indefinite hiatus.

=== 2003–2005: Extended break and side projects ===
In 2000, while also working with Silverchair, Johns and Mac released an internet-only EP, I Can't Believe It's Not Rock. In mid-2003, during Silverchair's hiatus, the pair re-united and formed The Dissociatives, releasing a self-titled album in April 2004. The duo provided the theme music for the popular ABC-TV music quiz show Spicks and Specks by reworking a 1966 Bee Gees hit of the same name. Johns also collaborated with then-wife Natalie Imbruglia on her Counting Down the Days album, released in April 2005.

Joannou worked with blues rock group The Mess Hall; he co-produced—with Matt Lovell—their six-track extended play Feeling Sideways, which was released in May 2003. The album was nominated for the ARIA Award for 'Best Independent Release' in 2003. Joannou and Lovell co-produced The Mess Hall's studio album Notes from a Ceiling, which was issued in June 2005. Joannou and Lovell received a nomination at the ARIA Music Awards of 2005 for 'Producer of the Year'. In 2003, Gillies formed Tambalane with Wes Carr, initially as a song-writing project, and they released a self-titled album in 2005 and toured Australia.

The 2004 Boxing Day tsunami resulted in the WaveAid fundraising concert held in January 2005; Silverchair performed to help raise funds for aid organisations working in disaster-affected areas. As a result of WaveAid, the band decided to resume working together. Gillies explained the band's reunion as due to a special "chemistry" between band members, telling the Sydney Morning Herald, "It only took us 15 years, but recently we've realised, 'We've really got something special and we should just go for it.'"

=== 2005–2011: Return from hiatus ===
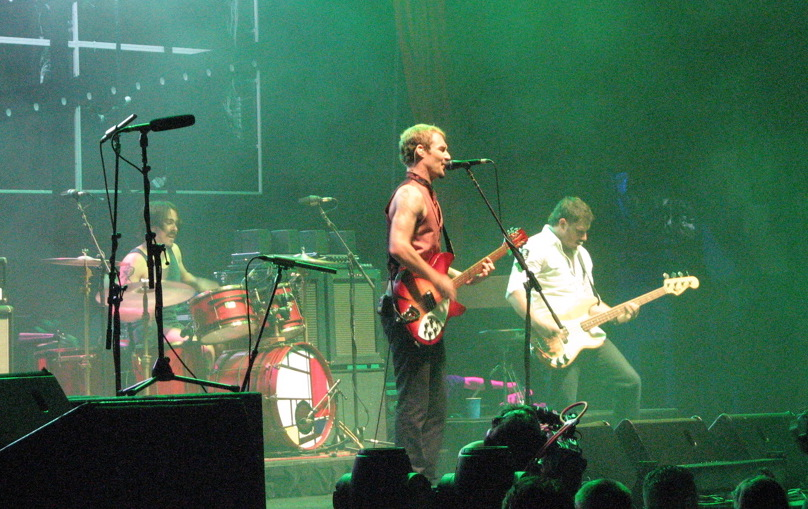
Silverchair performing on the Across the Great Divide Tour in September 2007.

After performing at WaveAid, Silverchair reunited, and by late 2005 began preparations for their next studio album, Young Modern. Johns had written about 50 songs during the hiatus for a possible solo album or other project but decided to use them for Silverchair. In 2006, after five weeks' practice, the group demoed tracks in the Hunter Valley before recording at Los Angeles' Seedy Underbelly Studios with Launay as producer. Parks again arranged orchestral tracks for the band—they travelled to Prague to record with the Czech Philharmonic Orchestra. The group also used Mac, Luke Steele (The Sleepy Jackson, Empire of the Sun) and Julian Hamilton (The Presets, The Dissociatives). Hamilton also co-wrote songs with Johns. Silverchair self-funded the album's production to ease the pressures they faced when working with a record label.

The band toured extensively before releasing the album, performing at Homebake and numerous other shows. Both Mac and Hamilton joined the tour as auxiliary members providing keyboards. In October, they performed a cover of Midnight Oil's 1981 single "Don't Wanna Be the One" at the ARIA Music Awards of 2006 as part of that band's induction into the ARIA Hall of Fame. During the performance, Johns spray-painted "PG 4 PM" (Peter Garrett for Prime Minister) on a stage wall, paying tribute to that band's frontman, who was at that time a Federal Member of Parliament and Minister for the Environment, Heritage and the Arts.

Young Modern was released in March 2007, as was the first single, "Straight Lines". Three more singles—"Reflections of a Sound", "If You Keep Losing Sleep", and "Mind Reader"—were released later. Young Modern became the fifth Silverchair album to top the ARIA Albums chart; they became the first artists to have five number-one albums on the ARIA Albums chart. "Straight Lines" also became the band's third number-one single in Australia. In June 2007, Silverchair and fellow Australian band Powderfinger announced the Across the Great Divide Tour. The tour promoted the efforts of Reconciliation Australia in mending the 17-year gap in life expectancy between Indigenous and non-Indigenous children. Support acts on the tour were John Butler, Missy Higgins, Kev Carmody, Troy Cassar-Daley, Clare Bowditch and Deborah Conway.

"Young Modern" and "Straight Lines" each won three awards at the ARIA Music Awards of 2007, taking Silverchair's total to 20. The group also won three APRA Awards for their song "Straight Lines", including Songwriter of the Year, which Johns was awarded for a record third time. At the ARIA Music Awards of 2008, Silverchair and Powderfinger each won Best Music DVD for Across the Great Divide, for Silverchair this was their 21st win from 49 nominations.

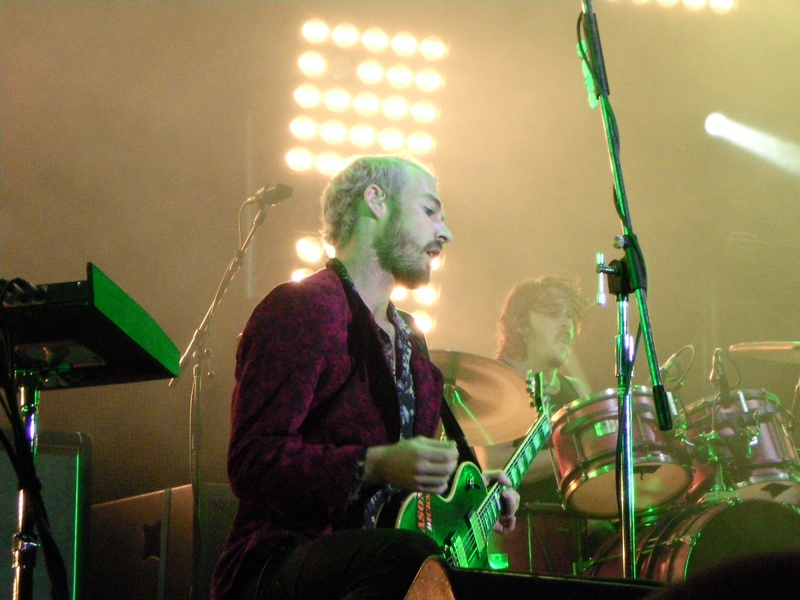
Silverchair performing in Bendigo May 2010

According to Silverchair's website, as of June 2009, the group had begun work on the follow-up to Young Modern; they had spent three weeks recording in Australia with future sessions earmarked for later that year. No release date was set, but the band uploaded in-studio videos of them working on several tracks to their official website. In December, Johns called in to Triple J's breakfast show, Robbie, Marieke and The Doctor, and discussed the band's new album which they were working on in Newcastle. He told them, "the main difference is there's a lot of experimentation with instruments and synths... I think there's only guitar on four songs out of fifty so far," but added the new material is "surprisingly rocky given there's no guitar." In April 2010, via the band's website, Joannou announced they would perform two new songs called "16" and "Machina Collecta" at May's Groovin' the Moo festival. He said work was progressing well and confirmed there was, as yet, no title for the proposed album and that they were simply referring to it as Album No. 6. The final concert of the festival was at Bunbury on 15 May, while what would turn out to be the band's final live appearance was a controversial set at the Northern Territory's Bassinthegrass festival a week later on 22 May. By year's end, work on the album had stopped because each member had pursued other interests.

=== 2011–present: Breakup and "indefinite hibernation" ===
On 25 May 2011, Silverchair announced an indefinite hibernation:

We formed Silverchair nearly 20 years ago when we were just 12 years old. Today we stand by the same rules now as we did back then... if the band stops being fun and if it's no longer fulfilling creatively, then we need to stop... Despite our best efforts over the last year or so, it's become increasingly clear that the spark simply isn't there between the three of us at the moment. Therefore after much soul searching we wanted to let you know that we're putting Silverchair into "indefinite hibernation" and we've decided to each do our own thing for the foreseeable future.

— Daniel, Ben and Chris, chairpage.com (Silverchair Official Website), 25 May 2011.

Sydney Morning Herald's music writer, Bernard Zuel, said the band's use of "indefinite hibernation" was a way to soften the blow of the group's break-up for fans; he expected future reunions and performances for worthy causes. By June, Gillies was in the final stages of about 12 months of working on his solo album, and he said that it was not a continuation of his earlier work with Tambalane. In October, Johns was working on the soundtrack for My Mind's Own Melody—a short film. In May 2012, Johns recorded the new anthem for Qantas, titled "Atlas". It is the first piece of commercial music Johns has composed. A remastered version of Frogstomp, which included bonus content, was released on 27 March 2015.

The members of Silverchair have occasionally stated that they have not ruled out a reunion. Gillies has said that there are plans to release a new Silverchair album, which was almost finished before the hiatus.

On 17 November 2017, the Silverchair tribute compilation album Spawn (Again): A Tribute to Silverchair was released by UNFD, with Johns saying he came to "appreciate" the experience. The album is composed of cover songs by Australian bands signed onto UNFD as a tribute to Silverchair, to celebrate the 20th anniversary of their album Freak Show.

Speaking to The Daily Telegraph in 2018, Daniel Johns expressed his love for the band—and appreciation of what the band had produced—but said he had no desire to reform the band. In May 2020, a picture of Johns playing electric guitar appeared online, leading to the Newcastle Herald speculating that a reunion was possible. However, in October 2021, when Johns was interviewed by Carrie Bickmore on the Australian news-current affairs and talk show The Project, he once again affirmed that the band will not reunite, while also stating that he still plans to work on new music but has no intentions to perform live again. In a separate interview with Carrie Bickmore, Johns elaborated further, stating that during his time with Silverchair, he had been the victim of sustained verbal abuse from the public because of his association with the band, which greatly impacted his mental health. Johns was open to musical collaboration with his former bandmates but not as a continuation of Silverchair as a band.

On 5 February 2021, it was announced that Silverchair's music would be distributed by Sony Music Entertainment Australia.

== Musical style ==
"Straight Lines"
"Straight Lines", ARIA's 2007 Song of the Year, was described as an "instant rock classic" by AllMusic's Clayton Bolger, asserting Young Modern was drastically different from the straightforward grunge on early albums, and the "few musical surprises" on Neon Ballroom and Diorama.

Silverchair are primarily an alternative rock band, who started out as grunge and post-grunge, but expanded into art rock, progressive rock, hardcore punk and baroque pop. Much of the band's early work was inspired by Nirvana, Helmet, Tool, Pearl Jam, Soundgarden, Alice in Chains and Black Sabbath. According to Ian McFarlane, "Frogstomp captured the tempo of the times with its mix of Soundgarden/Pearl Jam/Bush post-grunge noise and teenage lyrical angst."

In their early years, the perceived stylistic similarities led to Silverchair being derisively dubbed as 'Silverhighchair', 'not Soundgarden but Kindergarten' and 'Nirvana in Pyjamas' by the Australian media. The latter is a sarcastic conflated reference to the band's youth and the popular Australian children's TV series Bananas in Pyjamas. McFarlane stated, "Freak Show and tracks like 'Freak' were firmly in Nirvana territory with a hint of Led Zeppelin's Eastern mysticism". Gillies noted that the band were inspired by the Seattle Sound, as well as The Beatles and The Doors, and were highly impressionable in their youth. Johns admitted that "We were always influenced a lot by Black Sabbath and Led Zeppelin[;] it just so happened that we weren't very good at playing that style of music. So we were put in the whole grunge category because it was such a garage-y, heavy music term."

Australian rock music journalist Ed Nimmervoll felt that Johns "had never intended to use his problems for inspiration, but in the end the music was the best way to unburden himself. Neon Ballroom took six months to record. The album's passion and musical sophistication proved to the world that silverchair were a force to be reckoned with". According to 100 Best Australian Albums, by three fellow journalists—John O'Donnell, Toby Creswell and Craig Mathieson—Neon Ballroom's lead-in track, "Emotion Sickness", described Johns' life in the 1990s and "addressed [his] desire to move beyond the imitative sounds of Silverchair's first two albums ... and create something new and original". "Ana's Song (Open Fire)" directly focussed on his eating disorder; "[it] became a hit all over the world and opened up for discussion the fact that males could also be affected by anorexia."

AllMusic's Stephen Thomas Erlewine felt Diorama "was a shockingly creative and impressive step forward that showed the band shedding its grunge past and adding horns, strings, and mature lyrics to its arsenal." Fellow AllMusic reviewer Bradley Torreano noted that "they somehow kept going and kept improving ... Silverchair has grown up and put together a fine mix of orchestral pop and rock on Diorama." Bernard Zuel described how the Diorama concert tour marked a move from hard rock towards art rock: "they stepped out of the arenas and barns and 'got classy' ... finally having admitted to harbouring artistic ambition (a very un-Australian band thing to do), they've proved they have the ability".

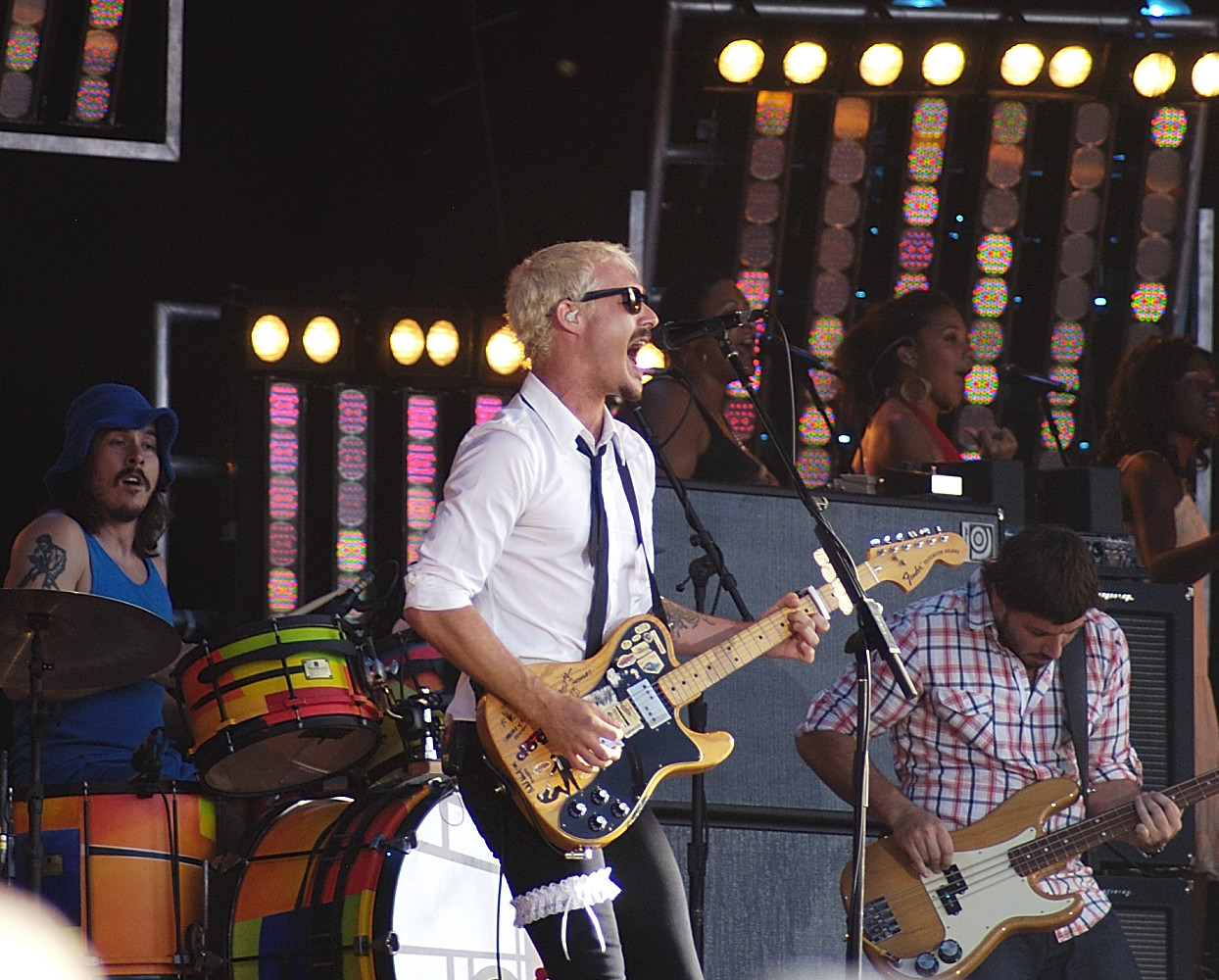
Silverchair on stage at the 2008 Big Day Out

In writing Young Modern, Johns tried to make the music sound very simple despite a complex musical structure. The lyrics were written after the music was created, sometimes as late as the day of recording. As Johns dreads writing lyrics, he suggested that the band could produce an instrumental album at some stage in the future. Johns is the band's primary songwriter, and notes that while Joannou and Gillies do not have significant influence on what he writes, they are key to the band's overall sound. For that album, Hamilton co-wrote four songs with Johns including the APRA Award-winning "Straight Lines". Joannou believed that Young Modern was simpler than Diorama but "still as complex underneath with simple pop song elements". He said that much of the band's success resulted from trying to push themselves harder in recording and writing. Self-producing has allowed the band to do so without the pressures of a record label.

Gillies notes that Silverchair will often "run the risk of losing fans" with their work, and this was evident in the changes in musical direction in Diorama and Young Modern. However, he described this as a good thing, describing the fact "that we haven't been pigeonholed, and people really don't know what to expect" as one of the attractive elements of the band. Despite the ups and downs of success at a young age, Gillies says that he and the band "appreciate what we've achieved and what we've got" in their careers. The band have received six APRA Awards, with Johns winning three songwriting awards at the 2008 ceremony.

== Critical reception ==
Frogstomp was described as similar to Nirvana and Pearl Jam; Erlewine noted that it followed in "the alternative rock tradition" of those bands. Erlewine also stated that "their songwriting abilities aren't as strong" as those of their peers. Contrarily, Rolling Stone claimed that the band had risen above their peers, applauding Johns' "ragged vocals". Herald Sun journalist Nue Te Koha praised Frogstomp for "breaking the drought of Australian music making an impact overseas". However, he felt "It is highly debatable whether the three teens have gone to the world with a new sound or something identifiably Australian ... Silverchair's image and sound are blatantly ... Nirvana meets Pearl Jam". Nimmervoll disputed Te Koha's view, "It's not original, it's not Australian. Bah, humbug ... It's just as well Britain didn't say the same thing when The Beatles reinvented American R&B".

Freak Show saw the band show more of their own musical style rather than copying others, and thus received more praise for its songwriting than its predecessor. Yahoo! Music's Sandy Masuo described the lyrics as "moving" and "emotional". Johns' vocal delivery was complimented: "[his] bittersweet, crackly voice tops the ample power chordage ... [he] hits shivery, emotional notes that convey both sweet idealism and disappointment". Zuel felt that with this album, the band "have outgrown the jokes, predictions and their own understated teenage ambitions to find they have become (gasp!) career musicians."

In 100 Best Australian Albums (2010), their third album, Neon Ballroom, was placed at No. 25, according to its authors. Entertainment Weekly approved of the further advancement in Neon Ballroom, commenting on "plush strings on these adult arrangements". There were once again significant advancements in songwriting; Johns was described as "furious, motivated, and all grown up". However, Rolling Stone said the album seemed confused, commenting that Silverchair "can't decide what they want to do" with their music. Meanwhile, Diorama was seen as an extension of the band's originality, with its "[h]eavy orchestration, unpredictable melodic shifts and a whimsical pop sensibility". According to PopMatters' Nikki Tranter, the album stood out in an otherwise dull Australian music market.

AllMusic's Clayton Bolger described Young Modern as an improvement by the band, praising "catchy melodic hooks, inspired lyrical themes, and stunning string arrangements". He claimed the album was the pinnacle of the band's development. PopMatters' Nick Pearson saw the opposite, claiming that "[o]nce you reach the level of intellectual maturity where you can tell the difference between cryptic but poetic lyrics and nonsensical crap, you have outgrown Silverchair". Pearson called the album an attempt to secure a safer territory and assure sales, after the success of past works, calling it more boring than its predecessors. Other reviewers noted influences from cult British band XTC.

In July 2009, "Tomorrow" was voted number 33 by the Australian public in Triple J's Hottest 100 of all time. As of January 2018, the group have sold 9 million albums worldwide. At the annual ARIA Music Awards, Silverchair holds the record for the most nominated artist, with 49, and the most awards won, with 21. Their breakthrough year was in 1995, when they won five out of nine nominations, including 'Best New Talent', and 'Breakthrough Artist' for both album and single categories. Their most successful year was at the 2007 ceremony, where they won six of eight nominations. In November 2020, the 1994 EP recording of the song "Tomorrow" was inducted into the NFSA (National Film and Sound Archive of Australia).

== Members ==
=== Core Members ===
- Ben Gillies – drums, percussion
- Chris Joannou – bass guitar
- Daniel Johns – vocals, guitar, keyboards, orchestral arrangements

=== Live Auxiliary Members ===
- Tobin Finnane – rhythm guitar (1992–1994, only in Innocent Criminals)
- Sam Holloway – keyboards, samples (1999–2002)
- Paul Mac – keyboards, piano, remixing, programming (1999, 2001, 2006–2008)
- Julian Hamilton – keyboards, backing vocals (2002–2005)
- Stuart Hunter - keyboards, backing vocals (2003 - 2005)
- Adam Sofo - keyboards (2007–2008)
- Unknown - keyboard, vocals (2010)
- Unknown - keyboard (2010)

== Discography ==
Studio albums

- Frogstomp (1995)
- Freak Show (1997)
- Neon Ballroom (1999)
- Diorama (2002)
- Young Modern (2007)

== See also ==
- List of awards and nominations received by Silverchair
- Music of Australia
