= Without You (Silverchair song) =

2002 single by Silverchair

Single by Silverchair

from the album Diorama
- B-side: "Asylum"; "Hollywood"; "Ramble"
- Released: 13 May 2002
- Studio: Studios 301, Mangrove (Australia)
- Length: 5:19; 4:12 (radio edit)
- Label: Eleven; Virgin
- Songwriter: Daniel Johns
- Producers: David Bottrill; Daniel Johns

Silverchair singles chronology
"The Greatest View" (2002)	"Without You" (2002)	"Luv Your Life" (2002)

"Without You" is a song by Australian rock band Silverchair, released as the second single from their fourth album, Diorama (2002), on 13 May 2002. It was written by lead singer-guitarist Daniel Johns and was composed during the recording sessions for the band's third album Neon Ballroom (1999) but was not used at that time.

The video is composed of many colourful auroras and seems to be in a space setting. It can be noted that Daniel Johns was sitting in a chair for a few shots. During the period in which this video was shot, Johns' reactive arthritis was worsening, and he could barely walk let alone play a guitar.

== Background ==
In June 2001, Silverchair entered a studio in Sydney with producer David Bottrill (Tool, Peter Gabriel, King Crimson) to start work on their fourth album, Diorama, which includes the track, "Without You". Lead singer-guitarist Daniel Johns wrote the song and formally assumed the role of a co-producer.

Early in December, the first single, "The Greatest View", was released to Australian radio networks. Early in 2002, Johns was diagnosed with reactive arthritis which made it difficult for him to play the guitar and subsequent performances supporting the album's release were cancelled. In March, Diorama was issued and topped the ARIA Albums Chart – it became their fourth No. 1 album and spent 50 weeks in the top 50.

"Without You" was released on 13 May 2002 and reached No. 8 on the Australian ARIA Singles Chart. In October, Silverchair were successful at the ARIA Music Awards of 2002, winning five awards including Best Rock Album, Best Group, and Producer of the Year for Johns. The band played "The Greatest View" at the ceremony: the song was also nominated for 'Best Video'. Two singles (and a related video) were nominated for further ARIA Awards in 2003.

== Track listing ==
Australian CD single

1. "Without You"
2. "Asylum"
3. "Hollywood"
4. "Ramble"

== Charts ==
Chart (2002)	Peak position
Australia (ARIA)	8
Canada (Nielsen SoundScan)	34
