= Luv Your Life =

2002 single by Silverchair

Single by Silverchair

from the album Diorama
- Released: 2 September 2002
- Studio: Studios 301 and Mangrove Studios, Australia
- Genre: Alternative rock
- Length: 4:12
- Label: Eleven/Virgin (Australia and South-East Asia), Atlantic Europe
- Songwriter(s): Daniel Johns
- Producer(s): David Bottrill, Daniel Johns

Silverchair singles chronology
| "Without You" (2002) | "Luv Your Life" (2002) | "Across the Night" (2003) |

"Luv Your Life" is a song by Australian rock band Silverchair released as the third single from their fourth album, Diorama, on September 2, 2002. The song was composed in the key of C major, and a music video was made in which the band was portrayed as animated characters. This is mostly because frontman Daniel Johns was incapacitated by his reactive arthritis, and the band needed to release another song to prevent commercial momentum for the album from coming to a complete halt. "Luv Your Life" was dedicated by Johns to "all my ladies", and was written on piano and featured an orchestral arrangement by Van Dyke Parks. Bassist Chris Joannou stated that this song is his favourite off the album. The single peaked at number 20 on the Australian Recording Industry Association Singles Chart.

== Music video ==
The animated music video was directed by Steve Scott and James Littlemore. When watching the video, one can see that Chris Joannou and Ben Gillies' animated characters seem to be more fluid and realistic than Daniel's. This may be due to Chris and Ben doing some sort of motion capture for the making of the video.

== Track listings ==
Australian CD single (ELEVENCD10)

1. "Luv Your Life"
2. "The Greatest View" (on Rove Live)
3. "Without You" (on Rove Live)
4. Rove Live interview with Daniel Johns (audio)
5. Rove Live interview with Daniel Johns (video)
- Tracks 2, 3, 4, and 5 were recorded live on 2 April 2002 on Rove Live.

Australian 7" promo vinyl (ltd 500 copies, now deleted) (ELEVENV10)

1. "Luv Your Life"
2. "Luv Your Life" (Van Dyke Parks Premix)

UK CD Single (7567853812)

1. "Luv Your Life"
2. "Asylum"
3. "Hollywood"
4. "Ramble"

== Charts ==
| Chart (2002) | Peak position |
|---|---|
| Australian Singles Chart | 20 |
| UK Singles Chart | 187 |
