= Straight Lines (song) =

2007 single by Silverchair

Single by Silverchair

from the album Young Modern
- B-side: "All Across the World"; "Sleep All Day" (demo); "Don't Wanna Be the One" (live)
- Released: 12 March 2007
- Studio: Seedy Underbelly (Los Angeles, California, US)
- Genre: Baroque pop
- Length: 4:18
- Label: Eleven
- Composers: Daniel Johns; Julian Hamilton
- Lyricist: Daniel Johns
- Producers: Daniel Johns; Nick Launay

Silverchair singles chronology
"Across the Night" (2003)	"Straight Lines" (2007)	"Reflections of a Sound" (2007)

Audio sample
- "Straight Lines" saw a musical change in direction for Silverchair.: file; help

Music video
- "Straight Lines" on YouTube

"Straight Lines" is a song by Australian rock band Silverchair. It was released on 12 March 2007 and debuted at number one on the Australian ARIA Singles Chart, becoming the band's first number-one single since 1997's "Freak". The single was shortly followed by the release of the band's fifth studio album Young Modern on 31 March 2007. Unlike the songs written during Diorama, when Daniel Johns wrote all the tracks himself, "Straight Lines" was co-written by the Presets' Julian Hamilton.

"Straight Lines" was awarded a double-platinum certification by the Australian Recording Industry Association (ARIA) on 2 September 2007, indicating combined digital and physical single sales of 140,000 units in Australia. On 28 October 2007, "Straight Lines" won "Best Selling Australian Single" at the ARIA Music Awards of 2007, as well as "Single of the Year". The song was the most played song on Australian radio in 2007. It charted at number two on the Triple J Hottest 100 of 2007 and missed out on the number-one spot by only 13 votes.

In January 2018, as part of Triple M's "Ozzest 100", the 'most Australian' songs of all time, "Straight Lines" was ranked number 74. In 2025, the song placed 28 in the Triple J Hottest 100 of Australian Songs.

== Music video ==
The music video for the song features a dynamic band performance, and was filmed at the Olympic Park railway station, Sydney, by directors Paul Goldman and Alice Bell (the pair behind the film Suburban Mayhem). The video appeared on the official website on 2 February. It was awarded "Best Video" at the 2007 ARIA Awards.

== Awards and nominations ==
=== APRA Award ===
- 2008 Song of the Year and Most Played Australian Work APRA Awards for "Straight Lines", written by Daniel Johns and Julian Hamilton, was presented by Australasian Performing Right Association.

== Track listing ==
Australian maxi-CD single

1. "Straight Lines"
2. "All Across the World"
3. "Sleep All Day" (demo)
4. "Don't Wanna Be the One" (live)

== Credits and personnel ==
Credits are taken from the Australian maxi-CD single liner notes.

Studios

- Recorded at Seedy Underbelly Studio (Los Angeles, California, US)
- Additional recording at the Panic Room (Sydney, Australia)
- Mixed at Metalworks Recording Studios (Mississauga, Ontario, Canada)
- Mastered at Gateway Mastering (Portland, Maine, US)

Personnel

- Daniel Johns – lyrics, music, production, additional recording
- Julian Hamilton – music
- Nick Launay – production, recording
- Scott Horscroft – production assistance
- Paul Mac – production assistance, additional recording
- David Bottrill – mixing
- Giancarlo Gallo – mixing assistance
- Bob Ludwig – mastering
- Hackett Films – artwork

== Charts ==
=== Weekly charts ===
Weekly chart performance for "Straight Lines"
Chart (2007)	Peak position
Australia (ARIA)	1
Australia Top 40 Digital Tracks (ARIA)	1
New Zealand (Recorded Music NZ)	11
Quebec (ADISQ)	36
US Adult Pop Airplay (Billboard)	27
US Alternative Airplay (Billboard)	12

=== Year-end charts ===
Year-end chart performance for "Straight Lines"
Chart (2007)	Position
Australia (ARIA)	4
New Zealand (RIANZ)	43
US Modern Rock Tracks (Billboard)	40

=== Decade-end charts ===
Decade-end chart performance for "Straight Lines"
Chart (2000–2009)	Position
Australia (ARIA)	86
Australian Artists (ARIA)	15

== Certifications ==
Certifications for Straight Lines
Region	Certification	Certified units/sales
Australia (ARIA)	2× Platinum	140,000^{^}
New Zealand (RMNZ)	Platinum	30,000^{‡}
^{^} Shipments figures based on certification alone.^{‡} Sales+streaming figures based on certification alone.

== See also ==
- List of number-one singles in Australia in 2007
