= Diorama (Silverchair album) =

Silverchair album

Studio album by Silverchair
- Released: 31 March 2002
- Recorded: April 2001 – January 2002
- Studios: Daniel Johns' home, 301 Studios and Mangrove Studios, Australia
- Genres: Alternative rock; art rock; baroque pop
- Length: 57:15
- Labels: Atlantic; Eleven
- Producers: David Bottrill; Daniel Johns

Silverchair chronology
The Best Of: Volume 1 (2000)	Diorama (2002)	Rarities 1994–1999 (2002)

Singles from Diorama
- 1. "The Greatest View" Released: 28 January 2002; 2. "Without You" Released: 13 May 2002; 3. "Luv Your Life" Released: 2 September 2002; 4. "Across the Night" Released: 31 March 2003

Diorama is the fourth studio album by Australian rock band Silverchair, released on 31 March 2002 by Atlantic and Eleven. It won the 2002 ARIA Music Award for Best Group and Best Rock Album. The album was co-produced by Daniel Johns and David Bottrill. While Bottrill had worked on albums for a variety of other bands, Diorama marked the first production credit for lead singer Johns.

Johns wrote most of the album at the piano instead of his usual guitar, while the band took a 12-month break following their previous studio album, Neon Ballroom. Silverchair worked with composer Van Dyke Parks on Diorama; the album contains numerous orchestral arrangements and power ballads, a change from the grunge music typical of their earlier work, but consistent with the band's previous orchestrations on Neon Ballroom. The album's title refers to "a world within a world". Four singles were released: "The Greatest View", "Without You", "Luv Your Life", "Across the Night". All appeared on the Australian singles chart.

Diorama was successful in the charts but was not as well received by critics as the band's earlier albums. It reached number one on the Australian Recording Industry Association (ARIA) Albums Chart and received a rating of 71 (out of 100) on review aggregator Metacritic. It was certified triple-platinum by ARIA, selling in excess of 210,000 copies, and won five ARIA Awards in 2002. Diorama was nominated for Highest-Selling Album in 2003, and three songs from the album were nominated for awards over the two years.

== Recording and production ==
On Diorama, Silverchair worked with a new producer, David Bottrill, who replaced Nick Launay. Though Launay had produced the band's three previous albums, lead singer Daniel Johns believed Diorama would be "the kind of record that people were either going to be into or were really going to hate", and needed a producer who would understand the band's new direction. He interviewed several candidates, eventually choosing Bottrill and taking the role of co-producer himself.

Johns initially recorded eight songs, only to delete the files thinking they were too similar to the previous album, Neon Ballroom. Leaving the security and darkness of his earlier work, he restarted from scratch to create something more uplifting by changing musical structure from the heavy grunge influence on their prior work to string and horn ensembles and complex song structures. Johns felt comfortable when making this radical change finding it helpful to regain his passion for music that had diminished during the grunge days. Johns wrote much of the album at a baby grand piano; he had previously taught himself the instrument, and Diorama became the first project incorporating songs composed on this piano. The stylistic change had a significant effect on the sound, including the difference in the way Johns' vocals resonate with piano as compared to guitar.

Johns and his collaborator Van Dyke Parks spent much of their recording time attempting to describe the music in metaphorical terms, with Johns describing Parks' orchestral swells as "tidal waves" and violins as "a flock of birds". The pair called the collaborative experience "mind-blowing". A DVD titled Across the Night: The Creation of Diorama was released in 2002, featuring interviews with Johns and Parks. Several songs on Diorama were inspired by Johns' then-girlfriend Natalie Imbruglia, but he cautioned against possible misinterpretations that the more positive tracks would be about her, noting that there were other people he cared for and lyrics. Johns denied rumours that he had written songs intended for Imbruglia's to sing on.

Silverchair intended to tour supporting Diorama following its release, but plans were postponed when Johns developed reactive arthritis, causing his joints to swell and making guitar playing and singing too painful. After performing "The Greatest View" at the 2002 ARIA Awards, Johns said that he wanted "to perform [Diorama's] 11 songs at least once in front of an audience" before laying the album to rest. He travelled to California to receive treatments for his arthritis, including daily physiotherapy.

== Release and commercial performance ==
"The Greatest View"
"The Greatest View" contained heavier guitars than many other Silverchair songs, and reflected Johns' experience of the media "watching over" him.

"Luv Your Life"
"Luv Your Life", dedicated by Johns to "all my ladies", was written on piano and featured an orchestral arrangement by Van Dyke Parks.

Following a 31 March 2002 release on record label Eleven, Diorama reached number one on the ARIA Albums Chart on 14 April, making it Silverchair's fourth chart-topping album. It went on to be certified triple-platinum by ARIA, indicating sales in excess of 210,000 copies. The album peaked at number seven in New Zealand, thirteen in Austria, forty in Switzerland, and 116 in France. Diorama reached number ninety-one on the U.S. Billboard 200.

The first single, "The Greatest View", was released in advance of the album on 28 January 2002. It reached number three in Australia, where it was also certified gold, and number four in New Zealand and Canada. Johns wrote "The Greatest View" as a response to the media "always watching [him] in different ways". It was not intended to be aggressive but rather a straightforward commentary on the media frenzy that had surrounded the band for many years.

On 13 May 2002, "Without You" was released as the second single. It peaked at number eight in Australia on 26 May but dropped to number twenty-nine the following week, spending only five weeks on the chart. The song was first announced by Silverchair bass guitarist Chris Joannou in November 1999, when he told fans the band had "a very small cache of recorded material stored away", including "Without You". "Without You" was followed by "Luv Your Life", which peaked at number twenty in Australia after its 20 September release. The inspiration for the song came to Johns during a therapy session, based on the idea that "there were people in the world who needed treatment but couldn't afford therapy." Johns composed most of the song's lyrics while listening to a therapist. In a performance at London's Shepherd's Bush Empire, Johns jokingly said "Luv Your Life" was dedicated "to all my ladies".

The final single, "Across the Night", was written by Johns over nine hours on a sleepless night, and arranged by Parks using twin keyboards and a full orchestra. It was released on 31 March 2003 peaking at number twenty-four on its three weeks on the Australian chart. The band's much-delayed tour in support of Diorama took its name from "Across the Night".

== Reception ==
Professional ratings
Review scores
Source	Rating
AllMusic	4/5 stars
Blender	3/5 stars
Mojo	3.5/5 stars
NME	3/10
PopMatters	(very favourable)
Q	3/5 stars
Rolling Stone	3/5 stars
Sputnikmusic	4/5 stars

Diorama received a score of 71 out of 100 on review aggregator Metacritic, based on nine reviews. Australian radio station Triple J listeners voted the album number one on their Top 10 Albums of 2002, while Triple J staff Rosie Beaton and Gaby Brown placed it third and fifth respectively. In April 2007, the album was featured on SBS-TV's Great Australian Albums.

Music magazine Rolling Stone gave Diorama four and a half stars in Australia and three out of five stars in the US. Reviewer Mark Kemp praised Silverchair's development into a strong, independent musical act, in contrast to their heavily influenced debut album, Frogstomp. Kemp spoke highly of the "heavy orchestration, unpredictable melodic shifts and a whimsical pop sensibility", also noting Parks' arrangements gave the music "more breadth and depth". He argued that the album's strength was a product of Johns' confidence, resulting in such quality cuts as "World Upon Your Shoulders", "Tuna in the Brine", and "After All These Years". However, "Without You" saw Silverchair slip into "old habits", according to Kemp, and contained an "MTV-approved hook". Nikki Tranter (PopMatters), Rob O'Connor (Yahoo! Music), and Bradley Torreano (AllMusic) agreed that the band had matured greatly since their early high-school releases, with Tranter praising Diorama for standing out in the "very similar" Australian music scene and O'Connor lauding Johns for "whisper[ing] his lyrics with grace and subtlety" where in the past he would "shout in angst", drawing comparisons to Elliott Smith. Tranter thought "The Greatest View" was a stand-out with "orchestral twangs", and "After All These Years" had "sweeping horns, introspective lyrics and soft, haunting vocals".

Torreano choose it as an AMG Album Pick, praising Bottrill's production likened to Big Country and U2 and commending Johns' "rich voice and shockingly catchy tunes with a gusto missing from their earlier albums". However, James Jam (NME) called Diorama "over-produced Aussie rock" and compared Silverchair to Bryan Adams in their attempt to "venture boldly into exciting new musical landscapes". He thought "Tuna in the Brine" was "grossly pretentious and overblown", while he saw the album as a whole as inoffensive, especially in comparison to the band's past post-grunge. According to Jam, the band were not trying to make a mature musical statement with the album but rather "impress their parents". O'Connor's main critique was that it still contained some "obligatory 'grunge' efforts"; he felt eliminating those would allow the band to reach its full potential. Torreano's criticism was reserved for two songs: "Without You" for its apparent Goo Goo Dolls influences that came across as "an unwelcome twist", and "One Way Mule" for reverting "back to their grunge sound".

== Track listing ==
All tracks are written by Daniel Johns.

No.	Title	Length
1.	"Across the Night"	5:38
2.	"The Greatest View"	4:05
3.	"Without You"	5:18
4.	"World Upon Your Shoulders"	4:37
5.	"One Way Mule"	4:15
6.	"Tuna in the Brine"	5:40
7.	"Too Much of Not Enough"	4:42
8.	"Luv Your Life"	4:29
9.	"The Lever"	4:22
10.	"My Favourite Thing"	4:14
11.	"After All These Years / Outro (hidden track)"	9:53
Total length:		57:13

=== Notes ===
- A limited edition of the album comes with a short film titled "The Making of Diorama".
- The Australian limited edition has a cardboard cover, and a gift promo card included inside.
- The vinyl version of the album was issued only as a promo, and is limited to 500 copies worldwide.
- There is a limited edition cassette of the album.
- In the 11th and final track on the album, the song "After All These Years" ends at 3:44. There is then about a 5 minute silence before the hidden track begins at 8:48.

== Personnel ==
- Daniel Johns – vocals, guitars, piano (tracks 2, 9, 11), harpsichord (track 1), orchestral arrangements (tracks 2, 4, 5, 9, 10)
- Ben Gillies – drums, percussion
- Chris Joannou – bass guitar

Additional personnel

- David Bottrill – production
- Anton Hagop – engineer
- Bob Ludwig – mastering
- Van Dyke Parks – orchestral arrangements (tracks 1, 6, 8)
- Larry Muhoberac – orchestral arrangements (tracks 2, 4, 10, 11)
- Rob Woolf – Hammond organ (tracks 3, 9, 10)
- Michel Rose – pedal steel (track 7)
- Paul Mac – piano (tracks 1, 4, 6, 7, 8, 10)
- Jim Moginie – keyboards (tracks 2, 5), piano (track 5)

== Charts ==
=== Weekly charts ===
Weekly chart performance for Diorama
Chart (2002)	Peak position
Australian Albums (ARIA)	1
Austrian Albums (Ö3 Austria)	13
European Albums (European Top 100 Albums)	40
French Albums (SNEP)	116
German Albums (Offizielle Top 100)	12
New Zealand Albums (RMNZ)	7
Scottish Albums (Official Charts)	100
Swiss Albums (Schweizer Hitparade)	40
UK Albums (OCC)	91
US Billboard 200	91

=== Year-end charts ===
2002 year-end chart performance for Diorama
Chart (2002)	Position
Australian Albums (ARIA)	13

2003 year-end chart performance for Diorama
Chart (2003)	Position
Australian Albums (ARIA)	27

== Certifications ==
Certifications for Diorama
Region	Certification	Certified units/sales
Australia (ARIA)	3× Platinum	210,000^{^}
^{^} Shipments figures based on certification alone.

== See also ==
- Silverchair discography
