= Across the Night =

2003 single by Silverchair

Single by Silverchair

from the album Diorama
- Released: 31 March 2003
- Recorded: Studios 301, Mangrove (Australia)
- Length: 5:37
- Label: Eleven
- Songwriter: Daniel Johns
- Producers: David Bottrill, Daniel Johns

Silverchair singles chronology
"Luv Your Life" (2002)	"Across the Night" (2003)	"Straight Lines" (2007)

"Across the Night" is a song by Australian rock band Silverchair from their fourth album, Diorama. It is the first track on Diorama and was released as the album's fourth and final single on 31 March 2003. It reached number 24 on the Australian ARIA Singles Chart. A video was created for the song in the style of early 1920s cinema, featuring acclaimed Australian actor Guy Pearce. The video was nominated for Best Video at the ARIA Music Awards of 2003.

== Track listings ==
Australian CD single (ELEVENCD15)

1. "Across the Night"
2. "Tuna in the Brine" (demo)
3. "One Way Mule" (demo)
4. "Luv Your Life" (demo)
5. "Across the Night" (demo)

Australian DVD single (ELEVENDVD15)

1. "Across the Night" (music video)
2. "After All These Years" (music video)
3. "The Greatest View" (live at the 2002 ARIA Awards)

Australian 12-inch single (ELEVENV15)

1. "Across the Night"
2. "Tuna in the Brine"

== Charts ==
Chart (2003)	Peak position
Australia (ARIA)	24
