= Abuse Me =

1997 single by Silverchair

Single by Silverchair

from the album Freak Show
- B-side: "Undecided"
- Released: April 1997
- Genre: Alternative rock
- Length: 4:05
- Label: Murmur
- Songwriter: Daniel Johns
- Producer: Nick Launay

Silverchair singles chronology
"Freak" (1997)	"Abuse Me" (1997)	"Cemetery" (1997)

"Abuse Me" is a song by the Australian rock band Silverchair. It was released as the second single from their 1997 album, Freak Show. In the United States, Sony chose "Abuse Me" as the first single from Freak Show despite protests by the band's manager. "Freak" was the Australian lead single and the preferred lead single from the album. It was also released on their The Best of Volume 1. The single peaked at number four on both the Billboard Modern Rock Tracks and Mainstream Rock Tracks charts, making it their second biggest hit in the United States (after "Tomorrow").

The single contained the B-side "Undecided", (not to be confused with "Undecided" from Frogstomp) a Masters Apprentices cover, which featured Deniz Tek of Radio Birdman playing lead guitar. Also included on the single was a remix of "Freak", produced by Paul Mac, marking the first time that Daniel Johns and Paul Mac worked together.

== Background ==
Johns said about the song: "With 'Abuse Me', I just wanted to get all the feelings off my chest, the feelings I'd had when I read all the negative commentary. The song is basically saying, 'Say what you like. We don't give a fuck what you think. We're just playing our music'." Johns also said that "every song I've ever heard sounds like another song I've heard".

== Track listing ==
Australian CD single (MATTCD049)/limited 7-inch (MATTV049)

1. "Abuse Me"
2. "Undecided"
3. "Freak (Remix for Us Rejects)"
- The song "Undecided" is not the Silverchair original song included in the Frogstomp album. This song was originally by The Masters Apprentices.
  - The limited 7-inch edition is now deleted and rare.

UK CD1 (6643681)

1. "Abuse Me"
2. "Freak (Remix for Us Rejects)"

UK CD2 (6647905)

1. "Abuse Me"
2. "Surfin' Bird"
3. "Slab" (Nicklaunoise Mix)
- Contains fold-out poster.

European CD single (6647902)

1. "Abuse Me"
2. "Freak (Remix for Us Rejects)"
3. "Blind"

== Charts ==
=== Weekly charts ===
Chart (1997)	Peak position
Australia (ARIA)	9
Canada Top Singles (RPM)	7
Canada Rock/Alternative (RPM)	1
New Zealand (Recorded Music NZ)	44
Scottish Singles Sales (Official Charts)	51
UK Singles (Official Charts)	40
US Alternative Airplay (Billboard)	4
US Mainstream Rock (Billboard)	4
US Radio Songs (Billboard)	44
US Pop/Alternative Top 20 (Radio & Records)	9

=== Year-end charts ===
Chart (1997)	Position
Australia (ARIA)	72
Canada Top Singles (RPM)	53
Canada Rock/Alternative (RPM)	5
US Mainstream Rock Tracks (Billboard)	23
US Modern Rock Tracks (Billboard)	36

== Certifications ==
Region	Certification	Certified units/sales
Australia (ARIA)	Gold	35,000^{^}
^{^} Shipments figures based on certification alone.
