= The Greatest View =

2002 single by Silverchair

Single by Silverchair

from the album Diorama
- B-side: "Pins in My Needles"; "Too Much of Not Enough"
- Released: 28 January 2002
- Studio: Studios 301 (Sydney)
- Length: 4:05
- Label: Eleven
- Songwriter: Daniel Johns
- Producers: David Bottrill; Johns

Silverchair singles chronology
| "Miss You Love" (1999) | "The Greatest View" (2002) | "Without You" (2002) |

Music video
- "The Greatest View" on YouTube

"The Greatest View" is a song by Australian rock band Silverchair, released on 28 January 2002 as the first single from their fourth studio album, Diorama. This is one of three songs which made it onto the album (the other two being "World Upon Your Shoulders" and "Too Much of Not Enough") which Daniel Johns recorded using his Rickenbacker 12 string.

"The Greatest View" peaked at No. 3 in Australia and at No. 4 in Canada and New Zealand. In 2008, it reached No. 36 on the US Billboard Modern Rock Tracks chart due to an EP being released by Warner Bros. Records. The Square-Eyed Films directed music video was nominated for Best Video at the ARIA Music Awards of 2002.

== Origin ==
In an interview with the Associated Press in 2002, Daniel Johns said about the song:

"The Greatest View" is a song that really focuses on people's perceptions of the same problem or the same scenario. Basically what was going on in my mind was that I had a lot of people who were watching over me and watching my every move making sure that I didn't fall back in to the heap that I fell in to whilst writing Neon Ballroom. Because I was aware of that I felt like I had the greatest view from where I was from because I could see what was going on. I was aware of the situation, I was in control of my own destiny really."

== Music video ==
A video was made in which the band plays in hotel room representing Daniel Johns' inner space which spies try to investigate and listen in on. At the end of the video, the whole hotel lifts up into the air playing on the words 'greatest view'. The music video was directed by Sean Gilligan and Sarah-Jane Woulahan from the Brisbane-based video team Squareyed Films.

Director Sean Gilligan uploaded a high-definition version of the music video to his Vimeo page in 2009. He also uploaded a version to his YouTube channel in 2020, but it was subsequently removed for copyright violation by SME.

== Track listings ==
Australian CD single

1. "The Greatest View"
2. "Pins in My Needles"
3. "Too Much of Not Enough"

UK CD and 7-inch single

1. "The Greatest View" (radio version) – 3:41
2. "Asylum" – 4:30
3. "Pins in My Needles" – 3:07

European and Canadian CD single

1. "The Greatest View" (radio version) – 3:40
2. "Asylum" – 4:28

US digital EP – 2007

1. "The Greatest View" – 4:05
2. "Straight Lines" (The Presets Remix) – 3:53
3. "We're Not Lonely... But We Miss You" – 3:34
4. "Barbarella" – 3:14
5. "If You Keep Losing Sleep" (video) – 3:22
6. "The Greatest View" (video—live from Carriageworks, Sydney)

== Charts ==
=== Weekly charts ===
2002 weekly chart performance for "The Greatest View"
| Chart (2002) | Peak position |
|---|---|
| Australia (ARIA) | 3 |
| Canada (Nielsen SoundScan) | 4 |
| Germany (GfK) | 83 |
| New Zealand (Recorded Music NZ) | 4 |
| Scotland Singles (Official Charts) | 92 |
| UK Singles (Official Charts) | 85 |
| UK Rock & Metal (Official Charts) | 11 |

2008 weekly chart performance for "The Greatest View"
| Chart (2008) | Peak position |
|---|---|
| US Alternative Airplay (Billboard) | 36 |

=== Year-end charts ===
Year-end chart performance for "The Greatest View"
| Chart (2002) | Position |
|---|---|
| Australia (ARIA) | 86 |
| Canada (Nielsen SoundScan) | 86 |

== Certifications ==
Certifications and sales for "The Greatest View"
| Region | Certification | Certified units/sales |
|---|---|---|
| Australia (ARIA) | Gold | 35,000^{^} |
^{^} Shipments figures based on certification alone.

== Release history ==
Release dates and formats for "The Greatest View"
| Region | Date | Format(s) | Label(s) | Ref(s). |
|---|---|---|---|---|
| Australia | 28 January 2002 | CD | Eleven; Virgin | |
| United States | 1 July 2002 | Alternative radio | Atlantic | |
| United Kingdom | 15 July 2002 | 7-inch vinyl; CD | Atlantic | |
| United States | 12 August 2002 | Hot adult contemporary; triple A radio | Atlantic | |
