= Neon Ballroom =

1999 album by Silverchair

Studio album by Silverchair
- Released: 8 March 1999
- Recorded: 9 May – 7 October 1998
- Studios: Festival Studio, Pyrmont, New South Wales, Australia
- Genres: Alternative rock; art rock
- Length: 49:42
- Labels: Murmur; Epic
- Producer: Nick Launay

Silverchair chronology
Freak Show (1997)	Neon Ballroom (1999)	The Best Of: Volume 1 (2000)

Singles from Neon Ballroom
- 1. "Anthem for the Year 2000" Released: February 1999; 2. "Ana's Song (Open Fire)" Released: May 1999; 3. "Miss You Love" Released: September 1999

Neon Ballroom is the third studio album by Australian rock band Silverchair, released in March 1999 by record labels Murmur and Epic. The songs "Anthem for the Year 2000", "Ana's Song (Open Fire)" and "Miss You Love" were released as singles and a short film was released for the song "Emotion Sickness". Neon Ballroom debuted at No. 1 on the Australian albums chart and peaked at No. 50 on the US Billboard 200 chart. It was also their most successful album on the UK Albums Chart, where it peaked at No. 29. The album was nominated for 10 ARIA Awards and was certified Triple Platinum by the ARIA for selling over 210,000 copies in Australia. The album has been described as "heavy rock with orchestral flourishes and synthetic touches with powerfully emotional lyrics" that reflects the personal demons of frontman Daniel Johns due to the band's rapid international success.

== Background, writing and recording ==
From May 1998, Silverchair worked on their third studio album, Neon Ballroom, with Nick Launay (Midnight Oil, Models, The Birthday Party) producing again. The band had originally intended to take a 12-month-break after the release of 1997's Freak Show, but instead chose to devote their time to making new music.

In 1999, Johns announced that he had developed the eating disorder, anorexia nervosa, due to anxiety. Johns noted that the lyrics to "Ana's Song (Open Fire)" dealt with his disorder ("And Ana wrecks your life/like an anorexia life"), where he would "eat what he needed [...] to stay awake." In June 2004, he revealed that his eating problems developed from the time of Freak Show and when Neon Ballroom was written he "hated music, really everything about it", but felt that he "couldn't stop doing it; I felt like a slave to it." Johns sought therapy and medication but felt "It's easier for me to express it through music and lyrics".

Johns said the album was approached differently compared to the band's previous records: "The first two albums were written with the music being second to something else – like school, and everything else that teenagers go through. My mind was on many things, and music was just one of them. On this album, music was the only thing I was doing and the only thing that I had to concentrate on. I approached it differently in that all of the songs were written as poetry. In three months I wrote about 112 poems, and I made a collage out of the poems, and turned the words that meant the most to me into songs. Then I wrote the music around words, rather than writing the words around the music."

In June 1999, drummer Ben Gillies said about the writing process, "In our year off, [Johns] turned into a hermit, we didn't see him that much. Me and Chris were keeping normal hours, and surfing and hanging out with mates. I didn't really think about the writing, I was just thinking about having a good time. I did have a hand in two songs, though "Spawn Again" which was actually for the movie Spawn, and "Trash" which is kind of heavy, a fast, punky one, but it didn't make the album, I am going to try and be more involved with the writing on the next album. This time I was just lapping up the great atmosphere here in Newcastle." Gillies, however, would not end up contributing to the songwriting on the band's follow-up album, Diorama (2002), with Johns writing all of the songs.

== Content ==
Neon Ballroom was an overhaul of the band's musical style found on their first two albums, Frogstomp (1995) and Freak Show (1997). "Anthem for the Year 2000", for example, retained much of the band's youthful rock energy, but featured a new rock song structure and various electronic effects. In March 2007, Silverchair frontman Daniel Johns said: "To me, I honestly feel like our first record was Neon Ballroom. I've never felt any different. I don't feel like our first two albums were Silverchair: that's our teenage high school band. I don't like them at all. I listen to them and go, 'That's cute', especially the first one, because Frogstomp we were 14. But the second one we're like 16, I'm like 'You're getting older. You're running out of chances'".

"Spawn Again" dates back to 1996 and was originally considered for the band's Freak Show album. It was recorded under the original title "Spawn" when demoing tracks for Neon Ballroom and included, in a remixed form by hip-hop group Vitro on the 1997 soundtrack to the film Spawn, adding various electronic elements to the track. A "Pre-Vitro" mix of the same recording was also released on the Neon Ballroom Limited Edition bonus disc, Volume 1 in 2000, and the Rarities 1994–1999 compilation in 2002. The Neon Ballroom album version of the song is a complete re-recording, re-titled "Spawn Again", featuring additional lyrics, specifically an entire verse adding to the animal liberation narrative. The album recording of "Anthem for the Year 2000" is a different mix on the Australian release than the one found on other releases (including singles). "Satin Sheets" was originally called "Punk Song #3" (and was a contender for Freak Show) and "Paint Pastel Princess" was "All the Same to Me".

Johns wrote all the songs on the album except "Spawn Again" which he co-wrote with Gillies.

== Release ==
Neon Ballroom was released on 8 March 1999 on Sony Records imprint Murmur. The album debuted at number 1 on the ARIA Albums Chart, and was certified 4× platinum by ARIA. It was also certified Gold in the United States. Neon Ballroom outsold Freak Show in North America and throughout the world. To date it has sold a total of 2 million albums worldwide. The album charted in Canada, where it peaked at No. 5. It reached the top 40 on the United Kingdom Albums Chart.

The album has also been issued in gatefold cover vinyl, limited edition cassette and 180-gram vinyl in 2010, as well as in a double pack with Freak Show. On initial release in the UK, Neon Ballroom was issued as a limited edition with a bonus enhanced CD (see track listing).

Neon Ballroom provided three Australian top 20 singles: "Anthem for the Year 2000", "Ana's Song (Open Fire)" and "Miss You Love"; a fourth single, "Paint Pastel Princess", did not reach the top 50. "Ana's Song (Open Fire)" peaked at No. 12 on the Billboard Hot Modern Rock Tracks. A vinyl version of the album was limited to 5,000 copies worldwide. In Europe and South America it became the group's most successful album to date. Rolling Stone's Neva Chonin attributed their chart success to the album's more "mature" sound.

After the release of Neon Ballroom, Silverchair's three-album contract with Sony Music ended. The group eventually signed with Atlantic Records for North and South America, and formed their own label, Eleven: A Music Company (distributed by EMI), with their manager, John Watson for Australia and Asia.

Neon Ballroom was certified gold by the RIAA on 12 October 1999.

== Critical reception ==
Professional ratings
Review scores
Source	Rating
AllMusic	3/5 stars
Electric Music Online	91%
Entertainment Weekly	B
Rock Hard (de)	8.5/10
Rolling Stone	3/5 stars
Ultimate Guitar	9.9/10

Electric Music Online, who gave it a score of 91%, wrote a highly positive review of the album, and picked "Satin Sheets" and "Miss You Love" as the record's best songs.

Sun-Sentinel writer Marc Weinroth heavily praised Silverchair's ballads on Neon Ballroom, as well as the use of an orchestra on many of the album's songs.

Australian rock music historian Ian McFarlane said "as well as being the band's best album to date, it was universally acknowledged as one of the best albums of the year."

German music magazine Rock Hard gave the album a positive score of 8.5 out of 10.

== Legacy ==
In October 2010, Neon Ballroom was listed at number 25 in the book 100 Best Australian Albums.

In July 2011, music website Concrete Playground ranked Neon Ballroom the 27th best Australian album. In September 2018, Australian radio station Double J ranked the album number 7 on its ranking of "The 50 Best Australian Albums of the '90s".

In January 2019, American online magazine Loudwire included Neon Ballroom on their "15 Best Hard Rock Albums of 1999". In April 2019, Loudwire listed two songs from the album, "Anthem for the Year 2000" and "Ana's Song (Open Fire)", on its "50 Rock Songs That Defined 1999".

In May 2019, David James Young of Australian website Junkee wrote that Silverchair "rarely felt more alive than on Neon Ballroom" and that "it's not the sound of a band aping its heroes — it's the sound of a band shedding its skin; an ugly but nonetheless necessary process of evolution". Young also complimented Silverchair's use of an orchestra on the album, as it "feels vital to these moments on the record, adding further dramatic tension to a record that's already thriving off of it." About the mixed reception it received from some critics, Young wrote: "With 20 years of hindsight, however — not to mention eight full years of Silverchair being spoken of in the past tense — there's a chance for those that may not have understood exactly where Neon Ballroom was coming from to reevaluate it under a new light. Consider that, when a lot of the criticisms were made about Neon Ballroom, it was from the viewpoint of being the most recent studio album for a still-active band."

In July 2020, British magazine Kerrang! listed Neon Ballroom at number 32 on their list of "The 50 Best Albums from 1999".

== Touring ==
Silverchair added an auxiliary keyboardist, Sam Holloway (ex-Cordrazine), for the Neon Ballroom Tour. The US leg had the group playing with The Offspring and Red Hot Chili Peppers, while Silverchair's tour of UK and the rest of Europe had The Living End as the support act. The group appeared at festivals in Reading and Edgefest, amongst others.

Following the tour, the band announced that they would be taking a 12-month-break. Their only live performance in 2000 was at the Falls Festival on New Year's Eve. On 21 January 2001, the band played to 250,000 people at Rock in Rio, a show they described as the highlight of their career.

== Track listing ==
All tracks are written by Daniel Johns, except "Spawn Again", written by Johns and Ben Gillies.

No.	Title	Length
1.	"Emotion Sickness"	6:02
2.	"Anthem for the Year 2000"	4:08
3.	"Ana's Song (Open Fire)"	3:42
4.	"Spawn Again"	3:31
5.	"Miss You Love"	4:01
6.	"Dearest Helpless"	3:35
7.	"Do You Feel the Same"	4:18
8.	"Black Tangled Heart"	4:34
9.	"Point of View"	3:35
10.	"Satin Sheets"	2:24
11.	"Paint Pastel Princess"	4:33
12.	"Steam Will Rise"	5:18
Total length:		49:41

Japanese edition bonus track
No.	Title	Length
13.	"Anthem for the Year 2000" (original version)	3:43
Total length:		53:24

Limited edition bonus disc
No.	Title	Writer(s)	Length
1.	"Anthem for the Year 2000" (a cappella version)		3:15
2.	"Spawn" (pre-vitro version)	Johns, Gillies	2:56
3.	"Emotion Sickness" (video)

== Release history ==
- 8 March 1999 – Australia
- 16 March 1999 – North America

== Charts ==
=== Weekly ===
Chart (1999)	Peak position
Australian Albums (ARIA)	1
Austrian Albums (Ö3 Austria)	13
Canadian Albums (Billboard)	5
Dutch Albums (Album Top 100)	65
European Albums (European Top 100 Albums)	31
French Albums (SNEP)	23
German Albums (Offizielle Top 100)	13
New Zealand Albums (RMNZ)	8
Swedish Albums (Sverigetopplistan)	26
Swiss Albums (Schweizer Hitparade)	40
Scottish Albums (Official Charts)	50
UK Albums (Official Charts)	29
UK Rock & Metal Albums (Official Charts)	1
US Billboard 200	50

=== Year-end charts ===
Chart (1999)	Position
Australian Albums (ARIA)	16
Canadian Albums (RPM)	55
German Albums (Offizielle Top 100)	78
New Zealand Albums (RMNZ)	29
US Billboard 200	197

== Certifications ==
Region	Certification	Certified units/sales
Australia (ARIA)	3× Platinum	210,000^{‡}
Brazil (Pro-Música Brasil)	Gold	100,000^{*}
Canada (Music Canada)	Platinum	100,000^{^}
New Zealand (RMNZ)	Platinum	15,000^{^}
United Kingdom (BPI)	Silver	60,000^{‡}
United States (RIAA)	Gold	500,000^{^}
^{*} Sales figures based on certification alone.^{^} Shipments figures based on certification alone.^{‡} Sales+streaming figures based on certification alone.

== Personnel ==
Silverchair

- Daniel Johns – vocals, guitar
- Chris Joannou – bass
- Ben Gillies – drums

Additional personnel

- David Helfgott – piano (track 1)
- Larry Muhoberac – piano arrangement (track 1)
- Robert Woolf – piano (track 5)
- Chris Abrahams – piano (track 8)
- Jane Rosenson – harp (track 8)
- Sweep (Johns' dog) – guest vocal (track 12)
- Paul Mac – keyboards (tracks 2, 4, 10, 12)
- Jim Moginie – keyboards (tracks 2, 3, 5, 6, 7, 9, 11)
- Jane Scarpantoni – cello, string arrangements
- John Harding, Fiona Ziegler, Carl Pini, Alexandra d'Elia, Leoni Ziegler, Emma Hayes, Georges Lentz – violin
- Leah Jennings – cello
- George Torbay – conductor (track 2)

Technical personnel

- Nick Launay – production
- Kevin Shirley – mixing (tracks 2, 5)
