= Freak Show (album) =

1997 studio album by Silverchair

Studio album by Silverchair
- Released: 3 February 1997
- Studios: Festival (Sydney, Australia)
- Genres: Grunge; post-grunge
- Length: 48:04
- Label: Murmur
- Producer: Nick Launay

Silverchair chronology
Frogstomp (1995)	Freak Show (1997)	Neon Ballroom (1999)

Singles from Freak Show
- 1. "Freak" Released: 13 January 1997; 2. "Abuse Me" Released: April 1997; 3. "Cemetery" Released: 1997; 4. "The Door" Released: October 1997

Freak Show is the second studio album by Australian rock band Silverchair. It was released on 3 February 1997 by Murmur record label.

== Recording and production ==
Silverchair began recording their second studio album, Freak Show, while experiencing the success of their debut studio album, 1995's Frogstomp, in Australia and the United States. Freak Show was produced by Nick Launay (Midnight Oil, Models, The Birthday Party). In December 1996, drummer Ben Gillies said, "it was just more fun making this album," compared to Frogstomp.

In February 1997, bassist Chris Joannou said about the recording of the album: "with Freak Show we were, I guess, in a way wanting to do something different, so we thought about it a bit that way -- but, really, it just happened naturally." He also stated: "we like this album a lot more than Frogstomp because the lyrics and music sound better" and "the bass is louder on this album, as well, which I'm happy about."

== Composition and lyrics ==
Musically, Freak Show has been described as a grunge and post-grunge album.

Simon Wooldridge, writing for Juice, claimed that the songs on Freak Show are focused on the anger and backlash that the expectations of Frogstomp brought upon the band.

== Title and artwork ==
In late 1996, when asked about why the album's name is Freak Show, vocalist and guitarist Daniel Johns said:

We decided to call it Freak Show because in the 1940s, there was these traveling freak shows with people with different things that [were] unusual about them. And they used to travel around from city to city and just display their talent or deformity or whatever it is, and we just thought, you know, we're not making fun of people with things different about them, we're just saying that it's similar to being in a band that travels around and just performing a show from town to town. And we thought it would be a good theme for an album.

The album's front cover image is an illustration of Grady Stiles, Jr., a sideshow performer afflicted with ectrodactyly, who used the stage name "Lobster Boy". The image is courtesy of Circus World Museum, Baraboo, Wisconsin.

== Release ==
Freak Show was released on 3 February 1997. The album reached No. 1 on the Australian charts and yielded three Top 10 singles – "Freak", "Abuse Me" and "Cemetery". Its fourth single, "The Door", reached No. 25. Freak Show was certified gold in the US by the RIAA on 4 April 1997 and 2× platinum in Australia.

The album was released on CD, limited edition cassette and 12-inch vinyl (coloured black in Australasia and yellow in Europe; limited to 3,000 copies worldwide). The CD release of Freak Show is an enhanced CD that includes interactive CD-ROM media from the making of the album. The material found on the enhanced CD is accessed when placing the disc into the CD-ROM drive of a computer.

=== The Freak Box ===
The Freak Box

Box set by Silverchair
- Released: 1997
- Length: 44:51
- Label: Murmur

A limited edition CD box set was released in 1997 by Murmur titled The Freak Box, and includes the four main singles from the album as well as a bonus CD containing interviews with the band members about the singles and the album.

== Critical reception ==
Professional ratings
Review scores
Source	Rating
AllMusic	4/5 stars
Spin	6/10
Ultimate Guitar	9.7/10
Rolling Stone	3.5/5 stars
The Buzz	(favourable)
Rock Hard (de)	8.5/10
NME	3/10

The German music magazine Rock Hard rated Freak Show 8.5/10. Along with the singles "Abuse Me" and "Freak", they praised the songs "No Association", "Learn to Hate" and "Roses".

Lorraine Ali of Rolling Stone wrote "Silverchair have loads of potential. The band may still be using other peoples' riffs to guide its post-pubescent fury, but it's the enthusiasm that makes this Freak Show more than a novelty."

American online magazine Loudwire considered Freak Show to be the 9th best hard rock album of 1997.

In his review for Freak Show, Stephen Thomas Erlewine, writing for AllMusic, wrote "Silverchair were slaves to their influences on their debut Frogstomp, but on their second album [...] they're beginning to show signs of developing their own style. While they may still concentrate too heavily on Pearl Jam and Nirvana, they're beginning to fuse the elements together in a more interesting way and are writing stronger hooks. Freak Show still has its share of mediocre moments [...] but the album shows potential that Frogstomp never did."

Chuck Eddy, writing for the American music magazine Spin, thought it was a better album than Silverchair's debut record Frogstomp, as Freak Show featured "punkier speedups, fancier breaks, and more dramatic climbing from quietude interlude to dude attitude". Spin also included "Abuse Me" at number 75 on its list "The 79 Best Alternative Rock Songs of 1997".

Jeff Gorra of Artist Waves wrote that Freak Show "truly showed how they had evolved as songwriters ... at just 17-years-old." The album's producer, Nick Launay, has said that Freak Show is his favourite Silverchair album. He said:

During the recording of Freak Show they were incredibly wild and young, the energy and adrenaline in the room was like the biggest sugar rush imaginable. Craziest moment: Ben climbing inside a flight case with a movie camera being pushed down the long corridor at Festival Studios by the other two crashing into walls while filming from the inside. Result: black screen, shrieking screams, major damage to the walls.

In February 2017, Josh Leeson, writing for The Newcastle Herald, wrote that "for many Chair fans the tortured anger of Freak Show remains a treasured edition in the catalogue of Newcastle's finest musical export" and that "20 years on it maintains its own freakish charm in body and soul."

== Legacy and influence ==
In March 2007, after explaining that he felt Neon Ballroom was Silverchair's "first album", Johns referred to Freak Show as "some kind of dark, high school band skeleton" in the band's "closet".

In February 2017, The Brag wrote that the album still hold up, "but in a different, lighter way". They also wrote that Freak Show is like "seeing your high school sweetheart many decades later – you don't feel the love, but you can remember how it felt. It's how music works sometimes. But it's enough that it works at all."

In April 2022, The Guardian ranked the Freak Show songs "Freak", "Slave", and "The Door" on their "The 25 best Silverchair songs - sorted" list at No. 21, No. 9 and No. 5, respectively.

== Track listing ==
All lyrics are written by Daniel Johns; all music written by Johns unless otherwise noted.

No.	Title	Music	Length
1.	"Slave"	Johns, Ben Gillies	3:58
2.	"Freak"		3:49
3.	"Abuse Me"		4:03
4.	"Lie to Me"		1:19
5.	"No Association"	Johns, Gillies	3:56
6.	"Cemetery"		4:05
7.	"The Door"		3:38
8.	"Pop Song for Us Rejects"		3:16
9.	"Learn to Hate"	Gillies	4:19
10.	"Petrol & Chlorine"		3:59
11.	"Roses"	Johns, Gillies	3:35
12.	"Nobody Came"	Johns, Gillies	6:12
13.	"The Closing"	Gillies	3:27
Total length:			48:04

== Personnel ==
Silverchair

- Daniel Johns – vocals, guitars, sleeve art direction
- Chris Joannou – bass guitar, sleeve art direction
- Ben Gillies – drums, timpani, percussion, sleeve art direction

Additional personnel

- Jane Scarpantoni – cello on track 6, string arrangements on track 6
- Margaret Lindsay – cello on track 10
- Amanda Brown – violin on track 8
- Ian Cooper – violin on track 8
- Lorenza Ponce – violin on track 6
- Elizabeth Knowles – violin on track 6
- Todd Reynolds – violin on track 6
- David Mansfield – violin on track 6
- Ravi Kutilak – violin on track 10
- Matthew Pierce – viola on track 6
- Alan Parry – viola on track 6
- Rudi Crivici – viola on track 10
- Pandit Ran Chander Suman – tanpura and tabla on track 10
- Ruk Mali – sitar on track 10
- Daniel Denholm – string arrangements on track 10

Technical personnel

- Nick Launay – production, recording, mixing on "Petrol & Chlorine" and "The Closing", string arrangements on track 10
- Andy Wallace – mixing on all tracks except "Petrol & Chlorine" and "The Closing"
- Mark Thomas – engineering assistance (Sydney)
- Matt Lovell – engineering assistance (Sydney)
- Steve Sisco – engineering assistance (NYC)
- Bob Ludwig – mastering
- John Watson – sleeve art direction
- John O'Donnell – sleeve art direction
- Kevin Wilkins – sleeve art direction
- Sophie Howarth – sleeve photography
- Adrienne Overall & others – sleeve photography
- Lydia Kullik – cover art design

== Charts ==
=== Weekly charts ===
Chart (1997)	Peak position
Australian Albums (ARIA)	1
Austrian Albums (Ö3 Austria)	22
Belgian Albums (Ultratop Wallonia)	41
Canadian Albums (Billboard)	2
Dutch Albums (Album Top 100)	30
European Albums (European Top 100 Albums)	43
Finnish Albums (Suomen virallinen lista)	28
French Albums (SNEP)	20
German Albums (Offizielle Top 100)	42
New Zealand Albums (RMNZ)	8
Norwegian Albums (VG-lista)	29
Scottish Albums (Official Charts)	71
Swedish Albums (Sverigetopplistan)	53
Swiss Albums (Schweizer Hitparade)	43
UK Albums (Official Charts)	38
UK Rock & Metal Albums (Official Charts)	8
US Billboard 200	12

=== Year-end charts ===
Chart (1997)	Position
Australian Albums (ARIA)	14
Canadian Albums (Nielsen Soundscan)	73
Canadian Hard Rock Albums (Nielsen Soundscan)	8
US Billboard 200	167

== Certifications ==
Region	Certification	Certified units/sales
Australia (ARIA)	3× Platinum	210,000^{‡}
Canada (Music Canada)	Platinum	100,000^{^}
United States (RIAA)	Gold	500,000^{^}
^{^} Shipments figures based on certification alone.^{‡} Sales+streaming figures based on certification alone.
