= The Door (Silverchair song) =

1997 single by Silverchair

Single by Silverchair

from the album Freak Show
- Released: October 1997
- Genre: Grunge
- Length: 3:40
- Label: Murmur
- Songwriter(s): Daniel Johns
- Producer(s): Nick Launay

Silverchair singles chronology
"Cemetery" (1997)	"The Door" (1997)	"Anthem for the Year 2000" (1999)

"The Door" is a song by the Australian rock band Silverchair, released as the last single from their second album, Freak Show. The band's vocalist and guitarist Daniel Johns said "It's influenced a lot by Led Zeppelin and anything from that era really. Before the album, when I actually wrote it and showed Ben and Chris, Ben and Chris liked it and they wanted to continue working on it and write a bit more, and I didn't really like the song. And they were like, 'oh, come on, we'll just use it' and so I said, 'yeah all right,' just to see how it would turn out. And it ended up changed a little bit and now I'm really happy with it."

In April 2022, The Guardian ranked "The Door" at #5 on their "The 25 best Silverchair songs - sorted" list.

== Track listing ==
Australian CD single (MATTCD062); Cassette (MATTC062)

1. "The Door"
2. "Surfin' Bird" (cover)
3. "Roses" (live)
4. "Minor Threat" (live cover)
5. "Madman" (live)"

Limited Australian 7" (MATTV062)

1. "The Door"
2. "Surfin' Bird" (cover)
3. "Roses" (live cover)
4. "Minor Threat" (live cover)

The three live songs were recorded in Chicago's Aragon Ballroom on 20 April 1997. Jeremy Chatelain from the band Handsome sings on "Minor Threat".

== Charts ==
Chart (1997)	Peak position
Australia (ARIA)	25
