= Anthem for the Year 2000 =

1999 single by Silverchair

Single by Silverchair

from the album Neon Ballroom
- Released: February 1999
- Genre: Heavy metal; arena rock
- Length: 4:07 (album version); 3:45 (edit)
- Label: Murmur
- Songwriter: Daniel Johns
- Producer: Nick Launay

Silverchair singles chronology
"The Door" (1997)	"Anthem for the Year 2000" (1999)	"Ana's Song (Open Fire)" (1999)

"Anthem for the Year 2000" is a song by Australian rock band Silverchair, released as the first single from their third album, Neon Ballroom. The song reached number three on the Australian ARIA Singles Chart, becoming the band's sixth top-ten single and their first lead single from an album not to reach number one, a feat "Tomorrow" and "Freak" had accomplished. The song reached the top ten in New Zealand, on Canada's RPM Rock Report, and on the UK Rock Chart.

Australian writer Craig Mathieson described the song as "a viciously compressed take on Queen's stadium rock moments that made Y2K into a generational battle".

== Origin ==
Songwriter Daniel Johns said "Anthem for the Year 2000" was inspired by a dream:

The whole thing is about youth rebelling against people who are supposedly more important. It's about youth having total control over their own minds. They do not need overweight people in suits telling them what to do and how to act. It is all about just being yourself. The chorus is very sarcastic. It is not supposed to be taken seriously.

== Music video ==
The music video was directed by Gavin Bowden, who also made some videos for the Red Hot Chili Peppers. Australian actress Maggie Kirkpatrick played the robot politician. Kirkpatrick said about being invited for the video:

My first reaction was, 'Why me?' I later found out that the boys were from Newcastle and, being an old Newcastle girl myself, I was more than prepared to help them out. I encourage anyone from my own town. Actually, my niece and nephew went to school with the guys.

== Reception ==
AllMusic critic Jason Anderson thought that "Anthem for the Year 2000" was one of the three highlights from Neon Ballroom.

== Influence ==
Northlane member Jon Deiley said:

"Anthem for the Year 2000" was the first Silverchair song I ever heard. To me as a young kid, it was intense and heavy and it wasn't til a few years later that I really began to appreciate the impact their music had on me at an early age.

== Track listings ==
Australian (MATTCD080)/European (6668362) CD single/Cassette single (MATTC080)

1. "Anthem for the Year 2000"
2. "London's Burning" (The Clash cover)
3. "Untitled"
4. "The Millennium Bug" (The Paul Mac Remix)

Australian 7-inch vinyl (MATTVO80)

1. "Anthem for the Year 2000"
2. "Trash"

Limited numbered UK CD single (6670882)

1. "Anthem for the Year 2000"
2. "The Millennium Bug" (The Paul Mac Remix)

UK limited 7-inch numbered picture disc

1. "Anthem for the Year 2000"
2. "The Millennium Bug" (The Paul Mac Remix)

== Charts ==
=== Weekly charts ===
Chart (1999)	Peak position
Australia (ARIA)	3
Canada Rock/Alternative (RPM)	6
New Zealand (Recorded Music NZ)	8
Sweden (Sverigetopplistan)	32
UK Singles (Official Charts)	93
UK Rock & Metal (Official Charts)	3
US Alternative Airplay (Billboard)	12
US Mainstream Rock (Billboard)	15

=== Year-end charts ===
Chart (1999)	Position
Australia (ARIA)	29
Canada Rock/Alternative (RPM)	26
US Mainstream Rock Tracks (Billboard)	68
US Modern Rock Tracks (Billboard)	65

== Certifications ==
Region	Certification	Certified units/sales
Australia (ARIA)	Platinum	70,000^{^}
^{^} Shipments figures based on certification alone.

== Release history ==
Region	Date	Format(s)	Label(s)	Ref.
Australia	February 1999	7-inch vinyl; CD; cassette	Murmur	
United States	22 February 1999	Active rock radio	Murmur; Epic	
