= Ana's Song (Open Fire) =

1999 single by Silverchair

Single by Silverchair

from the album Neon Ballroom
- Released: 3 May 1999
- Length: 3:42
- Label: Murmur; Epic
- Songwriter: Daniel Johns
- Producer: Nick Launay

Silverchair singles chronology
"Anthem for the Year 2000" (1999)	"Ana's Song (Open Fire)" (1999)	"Miss You Love" (1999)

"Ana's Song (Open Fire)" is a song by the Australian rock band Silverchair. It was released in May 1999 as the second single from their third album, Neon Ballroom. The song is about lead vocalist Daniel Johns' struggle with anorexia nervosa. "Ana's Song" peaked at No. 14 on Australia's ARIA Singles Chart, at No. 12 on the US Billboard Modern Rock Tracks chart, and at No. 28 on the Billboard Mainstream Rock Tracks chart. At the ARIA Music Awards of 1999, it was nominated for two awards. The track also earned Silverchair a Comet Award in Germany.

== Background ==
"Ana's Song (Open Fire)" was written by the group's lead singer, Daniel Johns. In 1999, Johns announced that he had developed the eating disorder anorexia nervosa due to anxiety and depression. Johns noted that the lyrics to "Ana's Song (Open Fire)" dealt with his disorder, where he would "eat what he needed ... to stay awake". Ana is the nickname given to anorexia nervosa by people affected by it. He revealed that his eating problems developed from the time of Freak Show (May 1996) and when Neon Ballroom was written he "hated music, really everything about it", but felt that he "couldn't stop doing it; I felt like a slave to it." Johns sought therapy and medication but felt "It's easier for me to express it through music and lyrics". Johns eventually overcame the disorder, realising that he would never be cured of the disease but could live a fulfilled life by learning to cope with it.

== Reception ==
"Ana's Song (Open Fire)" peaked at No. 12 on Billboard's Modern Rock Tracks. On the ARIA Singles Chart it reached No. 14. According to 100 Best Australian Albums, by three Australian journalists, John O'Donnell, Toby Creswell and Craig Mathieson, "Ana's Song (Open Fire)" directly focused on Johns' eating disorder, "[it] became a hit all over the world and opened up for discussion the fact that males could also be affected by anorexia".

AllMusic critic Jason Anderson thought that "Ana's Song (Open Fire)" was one of the three highlights from Neon Ballroom.

== Music video ==
The music video was directed by Cate Anderson, who also made the band's video for the song "Emotion Sickness". Australian actress Sarah Aubrey played the girl at the sink washing her hands, while having a distorted image of their cleanliness through the mirror. The video was nominated for an ARIA Award for Best Video in 1999.

== Track listings ==
Australian CD single

1. "Ana's Song (Open Fire)"
2. "Trash"
3. "Anthem for the Year 2000" (a cappella)
4. "Ana's Song (Open Fire)" (acoustic)

Australian limited 7-inch vinyl

1. "Ana's Song (Open Fire)"
2. "Anthem for the Year 2000" (a cappella)

European CD single

1. "Ana's Song (Open Fire)"
2. "Anthem for the Year 2000" (a cappella)
3. "Ana's Song (Open Fire)" (acoustic)

European CD single (with different cover)

1. "Ana's Song (Open Fire)"
2. "Ana's Song (Open Fire)" (acoustic)
3. "Trash"

UK deleted CD single

1. "Ana's Song (Open Fire)"
2. "The Millennium Bug" (The Paul Mac remix)
3. "London's Burning"

UK limited 7-inch picture disc

1. "Ana's Song (Open Fire)"
2. "Ana's Song (Open Fire)" (acoustic)

== Charts ==
=== Weekly charts ===
Chart (1999–2000)	Peak position
Australia (ARIA)	14
Iceland (Íslenski Listinn Topp 40)	40
New Zealand (Recorded Music NZ)	34
Poland Airplay (Music & Media)	7
Sweden (Sverigetopplistan)	46
Scottish Singles Sales (Official Charts)	48
UK Singles (Official Charts)	45
UK Rock & Metal (Official Charts)	2
US Alternative Airplay (Billboard)	12
US Mainstream Rock Airplay (Billboard)	28

=== Year-end charts ===
Chart (1999)	Position
Australia (ARIA)	85
US Modern Rock Tracks (Billboard)	62

== Certifications ==
Region	Certification	Certified units/sales
Australia (ARIA)	Platinum	70,000^{‡}
^{‡} Sales+streaming figures based on certification alone.

== Release history ==
Region	Date	Format(s)	Label(s)	Ref(s).
Australia	May 1999	—N/a	Murmur; Epic	
United Kingdom	3 May 1999	7-inch vinyl; CD	Murmur; Columbia	
United States	8 June 1999	Rock radio	Epic	
United States	26 July 1999	Adult contemporary; hot adult contemporary; modern adult contemporary radio	Epic	
United States	27 July 1999	Contemporary hit radio	Epic	
