= Miss You Love =

1999 single by Silverchair

Single by Silverchair

from the album Neon Ballroom
- Released: September 1999
- Length: 4:00
- Label: Murmur
- Songwriter: Daniel Johns
- Producer: Nick Launay

Silverchair singles chronology
"Ana's Song (Open Fire)" (1999)	"Miss You Love" (1999)	"The Greatest View" (2002)

Music video
- "Miss You Love" on YouTube

"Miss You Love" is a song by the Australian rock band Silverchair. It was released as the third single from their third studio album, Neon Ballroom (1999). AllMusic critic Jason Anderson called the song a weepy ballad reminiscent of Goo Goo Dolls. Commercially, the song reached number 17 in Australia and number 43 in New Zealand.

== Background ==
The song was written when Daniel Johns was suffering from severe depression, among other things. In an interview with Kerrang! magazine, Johns said that the song was "about not being able to establish a relationship with anyone, not being able to experience love outside of family". He also mentioned that he "wanted a song that people could perceive as a love song, while the lyrics are actually very angry". Additionally, the song appeared in the 2000 Australian film Looking for Alibrandi, although it was not included on the official soundtrack.

== Track listings ==
Australian CD single

1. "Miss You Love"
2. "Wasted"
3. "Fix Me"
4. "Minor Threat"
5. "Ana's Song (Open Fire)" (live video)

Australian cassette single; European CD single

1. "Miss You Love"
2. "Wasted"
3. "Fix Me"
4. "Minor Threat"

"Wasted" and "Fix Me" are two covers of the hardcore punk band Black Flag, and "Minor Threat" is a cover song by the band Minor Threat.

== Charts ==
Chart (1999)	Peak position
Australia (ARIA)	17
New Zealand (Recorded Music NZ)	43

== Certification ==
Region	Certification	Certified units/sales
Australia (ARIA)	Gold	35,000^{‡}
^{‡} Sales+streaming figures based on certification alone.

== Release history ==
Region	Date	Format(s)	Label(s)	Ref.
Australia	September 1999	—N/a	Murmur	
United States	2 November 1999	Mainstream rock; active rock radio	Murmur; Epic	
