= Freak (Silverchair song) =

1997 single by Silverchair

Single by Silverchair

from the album Freak Show
- Released: January 13, 1997
- Studio: Festival (Pyrmont, Australia)
- Genre: Grunge; alternative metal
- Length: 3:49
- Label: Murmur
- Songwriter: Daniel Johns
- Producer: Nick Launay

Silverchair singles chronology
"Shade" (1995)	"Freak" (1997)	"Abuse Me" (1997)

Music video
- "Freak" on YouTube

"Freak" is a song by Australian rock band Silverchair. It was released as the first single from their second studio album, Freak Show (1997). The song peaked at No. 1 on the Australian ARIA Singles Chart, Silverchair's second single to do so after "Tomorrow" in 1994. The band would not have another number-one hit until "Straight Lines" in 2007. In the US, it peaked on Billboard's Mainstream Rock and Modern Rock Tracks charts at No. 25 and No. 29, respectively. One of the B-sides of the single is a cover of "New Race" by Australian punk rock band Radio Birdman.

In April 2022, The Guardian ranked "Freak" at No. 21 on their list of "The 25 Best Silverchair Songs – Sorted". In 2025, the song was placed at No. 72 on the Triple J Hottest 100 of Australian Songs.

== Music video ==
The music video for "Freak" was directed by Gerald Casale, a member of Devo.

The video features the band playing in an oven-chamber, monitored by a scientist in a control room. Their sweat is collected by a doctor and taken to an elderly woman in an adjoining room. The doctor touches part of her flesh with the sweat, and it smoothens. The doctor injects a large amount of sweat into the woman, and she regresses to being middle-aged. The doctor calls for more sweat, so the scientist turns up the heat, as high as 175 °F in the oven-chamber, causing the band members to sweat even more. Their sweat drains into a sort of water cooler, where the doctor collects a glass of it. She gives this to the woman, and when she drinks it, her youth returns. However, she is still not satisfied, so she orders and drinks another dose and turns into an alien mutant. She loves the new look and pays the doctor. When this is all done, the heat lamps are turned off, and the room now seems to appear very cold. The band punch out their time cards and walk out.

The heat lamps in the video are actually orange lights; the band members were sprayed with water to make it look like they were heavily sweating. The scenes featuring the old woman were filmed separately at another studio.

== Track listings ==
- Australian CD single and limited-edition 7-inch vinyl (MATTCD040; MATTV040)

UK limited 10-inch vinyl (664076 0)

1. "Freak"
2. "New Race"
3. "Punk Song #2"

- The Australian vinyl version of the single comes in various extremely rare coloured editions: gold/yellow, clear, semi-clear/various colours, pink-marbled clear, smoked yellow, smoked red, and "no one knows which other colors". The UK 10-inch vinyl includes 10-inch collectible cards.

- UK CD single (6640765)
1. "Freak"
2. "New Race"
3. "Undecided"
4. "Slave" (Live)

- This formats contains collectible cards. "Undecided" is not the Silverchair track included on Frogstomp: this is a cover of the 1966 single by the Masters Apprentices.

- European CD single (6640762)
1. "Freak"
2. "New Race"
3. "Punk Song #2"
4. "Interview"

== Charts ==
=== Weekly charts ===
Chart (1997)	Peak position
Australia (ARIA)	1
Australia Alternative (ARIA)	1
Canada Top Singles (RPM)	55
Canada Rock/Alternative (RPM)	12
Europe (Eurochart Hot 100)	92
New Zealand (Recorded Music NZ)	23
Scottish Singles Sales (Official Charts)	44
UK Singles (Official Charts)	34
UK Rock & Metal (Official Charts)	1
US Alternative Airplay (Billboard)	29
US Mainstream Rock Airplay (Billboard)	25

=== Year-end charts ===
Chart (1997)	Position
Australia (ARIA)	20

== Certifications ==
Region	Certification	Certified units/sales
Australia (ARIA)	2× Platinum	140,000^{‡}
^{‡} Sales+streaming figures based on certification alone.
