= Chris Joannou =

Australian musician (born 1979)

- Joannou as part of Rock'N'Ride in 2013

Background information
- Born: 10 November 1979 (age 47); Newcastle, New South Wales, Australia
- Genres: Art rock, hard rock, grunge
- Instrument: Bass guitar
- Years active: 1992–present
- Formerly of: Silverchair

Christopher John Joannou (born 10 November 1979) is a Macedonian-Australian musician best known as the bassist for the Newcastle-based alternative rock band Silverchair. He is a twin to sister Louise Kipa. He was the first of the three band members to cut his long hair short. Joannou was nicknamed 'Lumberjack' by Silverchair fans for his love of trees and plaid shirts.

As well as being a well-known bassist, Joannou was the assistant producer for The Mess Hall albums Feeling Sideways and the ARIA award-winning Notes From A Ceiling.

He has used mainly G&L and Fender Precision Basses, and he almost exclusively uses Ampeg B-15 Portaflex combos. As reported to gearwire.com, Joannou uses an Ampeg SVT-2 into an Ampeg 810 cabinet and a new Ampeg B-15 combo in his live setup.

In 2006, Joannou spoke at the launch of a mental health scholarship set up to honour his cousin Nathan Trepezanov, who died by suicide at the age of 21 in January of that year. Joannou is of Macedonian heritage.

== Business ventures ==
Joannou is a co-founder and co-owner of the Lovells Lager beer company. He is also one of four businessmen who opened a bar and small entertainment venue on Parry Street in the West End of Newcastle, NSW, Australia, which opened in December 2013.
