= Spawn (Again): A Tribute to Silverchair =

2017 compilation album by various artists

Compilation album by Various artists
- Released: 17 November 2017
- Genre: Metalcore; progressive metal; post-hardcore; nu metal; pop punk; pop rock
- Label: UNFD
- Producer: Will Putney; Sam Bassal; Josh Schroeder; Troy Brady; David Bendeth; Erik Ron; Samuel K; Dave Petrovic; Jay Maas

Singles from Spawn (Again): A Tribute to Silverchair
- 1. "Anthem for the Year 2000 (by Northlane)" Released: 11 October 2017; 2. "Ana's Song (Open Fire) (by Hands Like Houses)" Released: 26 October 2017; 3. "Without You (by Tonight Alive)" Released: 8 November 2017; 4. "Tomorrow (by The Amity Affliction)" Released: 13 November 2017

Spawn (Again): A Tribute to Silverchair is a compilation album by various artists, released by UNFD on 17 November 2017. The album consists of covers of songs by the Australian rock band Silverchair and serves as a tribute to them.

A limited-edition LP was released, with only 1,000 copies pressed.

== Background and promotion ==
The album was created with the blessing of Silverchair's team to celebrate the twentieth anniversary of their 1997 sophomore record, Freak Show. All the artists featured on the compilation are Australian bands signed to UNFD.

Former frontman and songwriter of Silverchair, Daniel Johns, gave his support for the album, saying: "At first I didn't know what to think of this album concept, I guess it never really dawned on me that a Silverchair tribute album would ever be a thing, it's funny though, sitting down and listening to the tracks I felt a strange reconnection with these songs, most of them I wrote when I was a teenager. I appreciate the time these bands have taken to record these new versions of the tunes."

The lead single, "Anthem for the Year 2000", performed by Northlane, was released on 11 October 2017. The second single, "Ana's Song (Open Fire)", performed by Hands Like Houses, came out on 26 October. The third single, "Without You", recorded by Tonight Alive, was issued on 8 November. The fourth single, "Tomorrow", by the Amity Affliction, was released on 13 November.

A music video for the In Hearts Wake rendition of "Freak" was published on 4 December.

== Composition ==
Due to the number of different bands participating on the album, most songs had their genre described separately. The cover of "Freak" by In Hearts Wake was criticised for sounding like a "forgettable metalcore number". "Anthem for the Year 2000" by Northlane was reviewed as embracing their usual progressive metal sound. Hands Like Houses' rendition of "Ana's Song (Open Fire)" was described as being post-hardcore. The genre of the title track by Ocean Grove is described as nu-metal. Tonight Alive vocalist Jenna McDougall's delivery of "Without You" was reviewed as: "[giving] the track a familiar, uplifting pop-rock shine". "Straight Lines" by Columbus was said to be a "pop-punk banger".

== Critical reception ==
Professional ratings
Review scores
Source	Rating
Already Heard	2.5/5
Hallowed	4/7 stars
KillYourStereo	60/100
Loud	45%
Newcastle Herald	1.5/5 stars
Wall of Sound	6.5/10

The album received mixed reviews. Alex Sievers of KillYourStereo criticised it harshly, saying: "overall, 'Spawn (Again)...' is still not that great. For just like how a couple great songs don't make an album instantly great, a couple great covers doesn't automatically make a whole covers album great." Wall of Sound, in a more positive review, wrote: "I reckon [Silverchair] will be stoked to hear new age renditions of their classics, but in the same breath, there's maybe two or three versions that didn't need to make the final cut." Brian Giffin from Loud noted the only highlights of the album to be the covers of "Spawn", "Israel's Son", "Cemetery", "Anthem for the Year 2000", and "Straight Lines", calling everything else "either terrible (Tonight Alive, In Hearts Wake) or barely good". In a negative review, The Newcastle Herald called "Some of the worst offenders the big-name acts. Amity Affliction's Tomorrow is horrendously auto-tuned and In Hearts Wake's cover of Freak is a whiny industrial rock mess." Sêan Reid of Already Heard, in a mixed review, said: "While there are a handful of highlights, 'Spawn Again' is no different than most tribute records." Daniel Källmalm from Hallowed drew praise to Northlane's cover of "Anthem for the Year 2000", calling it "the most memorable track of the whole thing".

In a mixed review, Luke Nuttall from The Soundboard said: "The fact that there's quality from the Amity Affliction and In Hearts Wake here is a borderline miracle, and for a compilation that will undoubtedly prove to be something of a novelty in the future, there's enough to get into here without being disappointed." Mandy Stefanakis of Loud Mouth, in a positive review, wrote: "It works very nicely and with a little luck will unite some listeners who found themselves a little muddled during their Silverchair journey."

== Track listing ==
All tracks are written by Daniel Johns, except where noted. All tracks composed by Silverchair

No.	Title	Writer(s)	Artist(s)	Length
1.	"Tomorrow"	Daniel Johns, Ben Gillies	The Amity Affliction	4:08
2.	"Israel's Son"		Void of Vision	2:42
3.	"Freak"		In Hearts Wake	3:30
4.	"Cemetery"		The Brave	3:54
5.	"Anthem for the Year 2000"		Northlane	3:05
6.	"Ana's Song (Open Fire)"		Hands Like Houses	3:38
7.	"Spawn (Again)"	Johns, Gillies	Ocean Grove	2:55
8.	"Emotion Sickness"		Storm the Sky	6:13
9.	"Without You"		Tonight Alive	4:05
10.	"Straight Lines"	Johns, Julian Hamilton	Columbus	3:42

== Personnel ==
=== Bands ===
The Amity Affliction

- Ahren Stringer – clean and additional unclean vocals, keyboards, bass
- Joel Birch – unclean vocals, additional clean vocals
- Dan Brown – rhythm guitar, lead guitar, backing vocals
- Ryan Burt – drums, percussion

Void of Vision

- Jack Bergin – lead vocals
- James McKendrick – lead guitar, clean vocals
- Mitch Fairlie – rhythm guitar
- Matt Thompson – bass, backing vocals
- George Murphy – drums

In Hearts Wake

- Jake Taylor – lead vocals
- Eaven Dall – lead guitar, backing vocals
- Ben Nairne – rhythm guitar
- Kyle Erich – bass, clean vocals
- Conor Ward – drums

The Brave

- Nathan Toussaint – lead vocals
- Kurt Thomson – lead guitar
- Dave Mead – rhythm guitar
- Daniel Neucom – bass
- Brent Thomson – drums

Northlane

- Marcus Bridge – lead vocals
- Jon Deiley – lead guitar
- Josh Smith – rhythm guitar
- Alex Milovic – bass
- Nic Pettersen – drums, percussion

Hands Like Houses

- Trenton Woodley – lead vocals
- Matt Cooper – lead guitar
- Alexander Pearson – rhythm guitar, backing vocals
- Joel Tyrrell – bass, backing vocals
- Matt Parkitny – drums

Ocean Grove

- Luke Holmes – lead vocals
- Dale Tanner – vocals, bass
- Jimmy Hall – guitar
- Matthew Henley – guitar
- Sam Bassal – drums, production
- Running Touch – samples, keyboards, additional vocals

Storm the Sky

- William Jarratt – lead vocals
- Andy Szetho – lead guitar
- Lachlan Avis – rhythm guitar, keyboards
- Benny Craib – bass
- Alex Trail – drums

Tonight Alive

- Jenna McDougall – lead vocals
- Jake Hardy – rhythm guitar, lead guitar
- Cameron "Cam" Adler – bass, backing vocals
- Matt Best – drums, percussion

Columbus

- Alex Moses – vocals
- Ben Paynter – guitar
- Daniel Seymour – drums

=== Production ===
- Will Putney – production, mixing, and mastering (track 1)
- Sam Bassal – production, mixing, programming, mastering (track 2, 7)
- Josh Schroeder – production, mixing, mastering (track 3)
- Troy Brady – production, engineering (track 4)
- David Bendeth – production, engineering (track 5)
- Erik Ron – production (track 6)
- Samuel K – production (track 8)
- Dave Petrovic – production (track 9)
- Jay Maas – production (track 10)
- GZ Media – LP pressing
