= Pure Massacre =

Single by Silverchair

from the album Frogstomp
- B-side: "Faultline" (live); "Stoned" (live)
- Released: 16 January 1995
- Studio: Festival (Pyrmont, Australia)
- Genre: Grunge
- Length: 4:34
- Label: Murmur
- Songwriters: Daniel Johns; Ben Gillies
- Producer: Kevin "Caveman" Shirley

Silverchair singles chronology
"Tomorrow" (1995)	"Pure Massacre" (1995)	"Israel's Son" (1995)

"Pure Massacre" is a song by Australian rock band Silverchair. It was released as the second single from their debut studio album, Frogstomp (1995). It was a successful follow-up to the band's debut No. 1 single, "Tomorrow" (1995), peaking at No. 2 in both Australia and New Zealand. It also reached No. 17 on Billboard's Modern Rock Tracks chart and No. 12 on the Album Rock Tracks chart. The song was included on Silverchair's The Best Of: Volume 1 compilation album, released on 13 November 2000. A live recording of "Pure Massacre" was included on the bonus "Rarities" CD with the Frogstomp: 20th Anniversary remaster, released on 27 March 2015.

== Lyrics ==
According to interviews with lead singer and guitarist Daniel Johns in January 1995 and 1996, the song and its lyrics are inspired by the Bosnian War:

"It's pretty stupid, war, like that. So, it seemed the right thing to write a song about, rather than about the usual--girls or whatever. It took about a half an hour; it came straight to my head."

== Music video ==
The Australian music video was directed by Robert Hambling and consists of Silverchair concert footage in Sydney, Australia. The video was filmed in December 1994. The American music video was directed by Peter Christopherson. The Australian "Pure Massacre" music video and a live video performance of the song from June 1995 were included on the Frogstomp: 20th Anniversary Deluxe Edition bonus DVD in March 2015.

== Live performances ==
Silverchair played the song during a live performance on Saturday Night Live on 9 December 1995.

== Track listing ==
Australian CD and cassette single (MATTCD005; MATTC005)

1. "Pure Massacre"
2. "Faultline" (live in Newcastle, 21 October 1994)
3. "Stoned" (live in Newcastle, 21 October 1994)

European CD single (6612872)

1. "Pure Massacre"
2. "Acid Rain"
3. "Blind"
4. "Stoned"

UK CD single (6622642)

1. "Pure Massacre"
2. "Acid Rain"
3. "Blind"

UK 12-inch single (0166226420)

1. "Pure Massacre"
2. "Acid Rain"
3. "Stoned"
4. "Blind"

== Charts ==
=== Weekly charts ===
Chart (1995)	Peak position
Australia (ARIA)	2
Australia Alternative (ARIA)	1
Canada Rock/Alternative (RPM)	13
New Zealand (Recorded Music NZ)	2
Scottish Singles Sales (Official Charts)	91
UK Singles (Official Charts)	71
US Alternative Airplay (Billboard)	17
US Mainstream Rock (Billboard)	12
US Radio Songs (Billboard)	72

=== Year-end charts ===
Chart (1995)	Position
Australia (ARIA)	31
New Zealand (RIANZ)	37

Chart (1996)	Position
US Mainstream Rock Tracks (Billboard)	68

== Certifications ==
Region	Certification	Certified units/sales
Australia (ARIA)	Platinum	70,000^{‡}
^{‡} Sales+streaming figures based on certification alone.

== Release history ==
Release dates and formats for "Pure Massacre"
Region	Date	Format(s)	Label(s)	Ref.
Australia	16 January 1995	CD; cassette	Murmur	
United Kingdom	17 July 1995	12-inch vinyl; CD	Murmur	
