= Shade (Silverchair song) =

1995 single by Silverchair

Single by Silverchair

from the album Frogstomp
- Released: 29 May 1995
- Studio: Festival (Pyrmont, Australia)
- Length: 4:01
- Label: Murmur
- Songwriters: Daniel Johns; Ben Gillies
- Producer: Kevin "Caveman" Shirley

Silverchair singles chronology
| "Israel's Son" (1995) | "Shade" (1995) | "Freak" (1997) |

"Shade" is a song by Australian rock band Silverchair. It was released on 29 May 1995 as the fourth single from their debut studio album, Frogstomp (1995). It was the only single to not be included on Silverchair's compilation album The Best Of: Volume 1, released on 13 November 2000. Lyrically, "Shade" is about abuse.

== Critical reception ==
In June 2015, Soundscape Magazine writer Colm Browne wrote that the song has a "terrific sound that is extremely pleasing to listen to. The lyrics are very simple and short but they seem much more heartfelt and that they may relate to the band personally".

== Music video ==
A music video, directed by Robert Hambling, was made for the song and filmed at NSN Studios in Newcastle, Australia on 24 May 1995.

== Track listing ==
Australian CD single

1. "Shade"
2. "Madman" (Vocal mix)
3. "Israel's Son" (live)

== Charts ==
| Chart (1996) | Peak position |
|---|---|
| Australia (ARIA) | 28 |
| Canada Rock/Alternative (RPM) | 29 |
| New Zealand (Recorded Music NZ) | 47 |
