= FutureNever =

Studio album by Daniel Johns
- Released: 22 April 2022
- Genres: Opera, dance, electro
- Length: 44:38
- Label: BMG Music Australia
- Producers: Beau Golden; Casey Golden; Daniel Johns; Dave Jenkins Jr; Jake Meadows; Louis Schoorl; MXXWLL; Peking Duk; Sam La More; Slumberjack; This Week in the Universe; What So Not

Daniel Johns chronology
Talk (2015)	FutureNever (2022)

Singles from FutureNever
- 1. "I Feel Electric" Released: 22 April 2022

FutureNever is the second studio album by the Australian musician Daniel Johns, released on 22 April 2022 by BMG Music Australia. It was announced in December 2021 and initially scheduled for release on 1 April 2022 until it was delayed to 22 April to include the song "Emergency Calls Only". Johns said that he did not want to release any singles before the album, as he intended it to "be enjoyed as an album". Johns missed his own album launch party due to crashing his car in a high-range DUI incident.

At the 2022 ARIA Music Awards, the album was nominated for Best Solo Artist.

At the AIR Awards of 2023, the album was nominated for Independent Album of the Year and won Best Independent Pop Album or EP.

In November 2025, Daniel Johns released his short film, 'What if the FutureNever Happened?' at four dates around his home country. At the Sydney event, chaired by Dylan Lewis from Recovery, Daniel hinted he had been making new music and mused, we're going Back to the FutureNever with a second short film and album titled 'FutureNever Forever'. The sequel album and film would focus more on the Diorama years of Silverchair, where a Magician timefraveller from the future, played by Johns, would assist the alternate reality version of 'Silverchair', 'Mindriot', during his anorexia eating disorder and severe arthritis illnesses to be able to get through it and continue making music.

== Reception ==
Professional ratings
Review scores
Source	Rating
The Guardian	4/5 stars
NME	4/5 stars

Andrew Trendell from NME wrote, "While there's a lot of Daniel Johns at his best here, this isn't The Best of Daniel Johns. There's rock bravado throughout, but you won't get a whiff of Frogstomp. Styles and eras clash, but Neon Ballroom it ain't. There is, however, a vulnerability, curiosity and adventure that makes FutureNever unmistakably Johns."

== Track listing ==
FutureNever track listing
No.	Title	Writer(s)	Producer(s)	Length
1.	"Reclaim Your Heart"	Daniel Johns; Josh Wakely	Johns; Louis Schoorl	4:11
2.	"Mansions"	Johns; Beau Golden; Casey Golden	Johns; B. Golden; C. Golden	3:45
3.	"Where Do We Go?"	Johns; B. Golden; Dave Jenkins Jr; Jake Meadows	Johns; B. Golden; Jenkins; Meadows	2:57
4.	"Cocaine Killa" (featuring Peking Duk)	Johns; Adam Hyde; Reuben Styles-Richards; Sam Littlemore	Johns; Peking Duk; Sam La More	3:36
5.	"Stand 'Em Up" (featuring What So Not)	Johns; Christopher Emerson	Johns; What So Not	3:38
6.	"I Feel Electric" (featuring Moxie Raia)	Johns; Laura Raia; Mark Landon; Maxwell Bidstrup	Johns; MXXWLL	3:53
7.	"Emergency Calls Only" (featuring Van Dyke Parks)	Johns	Johns	4:38
8.	"FreakNever" (featuring Purplegirl)	Johns	Johns; B. Golden; Jenkins; Mitch Kenny^{[a]}	4:28
9.	"D4ngrsboy" (featuring This Week in the Universe)	Johns; B. Golden; C. Golden	Johns; This Week in the Universe	4:03
10.	"When We Take Over"	Johns	Johns; Schoorl	2:30
11.	"Someone Call an Ambulance"	Johns	Johns; Schoorl	3:06
12.	"Those Thieving Birds Pt. 3"	Johns	Johns; Schoorl; Slumberjack	4:02
Total length:				44:38

== Charts ==
=== Weekly charts ===
Weekly chart performance for FutureNever
Chart (2022)	Peak position
Australian Albums (ARIA)	1
UK Album Downloads (Official Charts)	18

=== Year-end charts ===
Year-end chart performance for FutureNever
Chart (2022)	Position
Australian Albums (ARIA)	42

== Certifications ==
Certifications for FutureNever
Region	Certification	Certified units/sales
Australia (ARIA)	Silver	20,000^{‡}
^{‡} Sales+streaming figures based on certification alone.
