= Not All the Beautiful Things =

- Album front cover by Luke Eblen

Studio album by What So Not
- Released: 9 March 2018
- Recorded: 2015–2018
- Studios: Daniel Johns home (Newcastle); Neon Gold Records workshop (Nicaragua); Sonar Music, (Sydney)
- Genres: Bass; hip hop; house
- Length: 46:46
- Labels: Counter; Sweat It Out; Warner
- Producers: Chris Emerson; Dyro; James Earl; San Holo; Jono Ma; Skrillex; Slumberjack

Singles from Not All the Beautiful Things
- 1. "Be Ok Again" Released: 28 November 2017; 2. "Stuck in Orbit" Released: 30 January 2018; 3. "Beautiful" Released: 27 February 2018

Not All the Beautiful Things is the debut studio album by Australian musical project What So Not, which is the performing name of DJ and producer Chris Emerson. It was released on 9 March 2018 through Counter Records and Sweat It Out. What So Not began work on the album after completing a six-year long global tour, which had left him unable to commit fully to working on a studio album. His frequent travels influenced the sound of many of the album's tracks, including "Beautiful" and "Us". What So Not chose the record's title because the "simple pleasures" of life are ignored by people who focus only on their grandiose ideas.

The record contains twelve songs, all featuring production collaborations and performances with a range of artists: Toto, Skrillex, Dyro, Daniel Johns and San Holo. Its songwriting was managed by a list of co-writers, inclusive of Anna Lunoe, Off Bloom and Ryan McMahon of Captain Cuts. The tracks comprise What So Not's signature future bass and trap sounds, while experimenting with other electronic music genres including hip hop, dubstep, and house.

It received generally positive reviews from music critics, who praised the featured guests and production quality. The record includes three singles — "Be Ok Again" with Daniel Johns in November 2017, "Stuck in Orbit" with Buoy in January 2018, and "Beautiful" with Winona Oak in February 2018. In support of the album, What So Not embarked on an international tour named the Beautiful Things World Tour which lasted from January to May 2018. It charted in the United States (Dance/Electronic Albums) and Australia (ARIA), peaking at number eight and fourteen respectively.

== Background and development ==
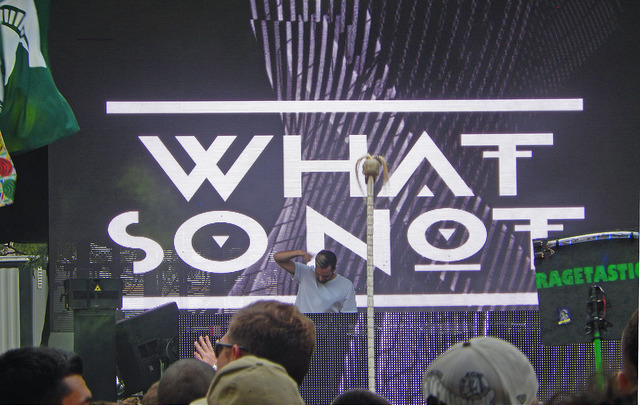
What So Not performing at the North Coast Music Festival, Chicago in August 2014

Not All the Beautiful Things was issued by Australian electronic music project, What So Not, also known as Emoh Instead. He had previously released four extended plays (EPs) under his project name. Three of these were co-produced with Australian artist Flume who left the project in February 2015, which at that time What So Not had carried the majority of the project by performing on his own. After touring extensively, What So Not returned to Sydney in 2017 hoping to complete work on a studio-length album, which ultimately became Not All the Beautiful Things. He had been unable to do so while on the move, saying: "I had a few test runs with EPs and things, particularly with Divide and Conquer, but I don't think I could have really done an album before this point, because I ended up on tour for almost six years."

What So Not's experiences while performing influenced several of the album's songs. For example, he said the song "Beautiful" was created while he was backpacking and camping in Nicaragua. He had also written multiple tracks in a Nicaraguan songwriting workshop organised by Neon Gold Records. What So Not took on the role of creative director for the first time in his career on Not All the Beautiful Things. This gave him control over the production, songwriting, film scoring and its direction. He felt this led to a "cohesive narrative" across all creative aspects of the project. It was recorded from 2015 to 2018, in between touring.

What So Not said the record's title was a "tribute to the things we lose along the way when we're striving for things", in particular when individuals focus on "all these grand goals" and "forget everything that's in front of them." He also said the title encompasses the entire narrative of the album and encapsulates his own dramatic endings to personal relationships. The producer said while working on the album he avoided "putting any pressure on [himself]" in the onset and simply tried to have it completed by a certain point. He focused on the record's songwriting and toplining (lyrical writing over a pre-made track). Originally, as many as 100 song demos were made for it, but only 12 tracks that fit the artist's narrative were used. What So Not described its songs as "brutally honest and raw", representing his attempts to "[dive] into the deep end with things [he had] maybe never tried before."

Not All the Beautiful Things includes collaborations with other artists the producer describes as people that he has admired and befriended across the years. He said that the collaboration with Daniel Johns occurred during a time when they "randomly crossed paths and hit it off". The collaboration with Toto surprised him as the band had not previously worked with a dance music producer. They reportedly held jam sessions where What So Not would play some chords, a riff, or a drum beat and the band would "riff over the top and do a call and response thing."

In January 2018, the DJ announced its release date as 9 March via Counter Records / Sweat It Out / Warner Music Australia, and publicised its track list. The record primarily incorporates What So Not's signature trap and future bass sound, while encompassing bass music, hip hop, dubstep, and house. A remix album was later released on 16 November 2018, comprising remixes by eleven different artists including 12th Planet, Marlo and Graves.

An international tour was announced in January 2018, the Beautiful Things World Tour. Lasting from 19 January to 4 May, the event brought the DJ to many international festivals including Ultra, Bonnaroo and Lollapalooza, as well as performances in India, China, Europe, South America and North America. The Australian leg of the tour took in Perth, Adelaide, Melbourne, Sydney, and Brisbane in June 2018. What So Not used a new touring rig for his shows, which include a large chrome horse and chariot set-up.

== Singles ==
The album's first single, "Be Ok Again", was released on 28 November 2017 and featured Australian singer Daniel Johns, former frontman of the rock band Silverchair. The single included uncredited vocals by What So Not, marking his first recorded vocal performance. Dancing Astronaut's David Klemow described "Be Ok Again" as a future bass track which "plays upon the project's earliest core appeals, returning to fluttering vocal work over bold, bombastic build ups and wiry, off-kilter breaks". What So Not, who described the song as a "really personal track", said it originated during a studio session in 2017 with music and production duo Slumberjack (Morgan Then, Fletcher Ehlers). Daniel Johns was walking by; he invited What So Not to collaborate at the singer's Newcastle studio. Johns had also co-written two more of the record's songs: "If You Only Knew" and "Same Mistakes". He reacted positively to his collaboration with What So Not, stating: "Watching [What So Not] work is eye opening". The track's music video, co-directed with Australian film maker Luke Eblen, was released on 23 January 2018. Eblen had also provided the album's cover art (see above).

"Stuck in Orbit" was released on 30 January 2018 as its second single. It features Sydney-based singer Buoy (Charmian Kingston) and was co-produced with Jono Ma of Australian psychedelic dance band Jagwar Ma. In an emailed statement to Billboard, What So Not revealed that the song started as a jam with Jona Ma in his film scoring studio (Sonar Music). The vocals "began as a sketch of ad libs from Buoy with only two words, drawn out across the verse 'I ov-er comp-en-sate'". He discovered Buoy's vocals through a local community radio station in Australia. After learning she lived near his parents in Sydney, they met up to collaborate. One night when an airport system crash had left the DJ stranded, he channeled his frustrations musically and came up with the lyrics for "Stuck In Orbit". After returning home he brainstormed the final elements of the vocals with Winona Oak (Johanna Ekmark) and Buoy. The song was recorded through Skype, due to What So Not's busy touring schedule, which made it difficult for him to spend time in his studio.

"Beautiful", featuring Winona Oak, was released on 27 February 2018 as the final single. Critics praised the "hypnotic, carefree aesthetic" of the track which complements Oak's "show-stopping" vocals. What So Not explained the song was constructed in a Nicaraguan songwriting camp where he met Oak, and this influenced the track's sound design. Ryan McMahon of production trio Captain Cuts (Ben Berger, Ryan McMahon, Ryan Rabin) was involved with the vocal ad-libbing of the song. They worked on the idea of "beautiful pain", which led to a song of "optimism, anxiousness and longing, but also an undertone of sadness". House music producer Chris Lake gave him production tips on "how to do a few things I had forgotten."

== Reception ==
Professional ratings
Review scores
Source	Rating
AllMusic	3/5 stars
Exclaim!	6/10
Themusic	4/5 stars

Music critics were generally positive towards Not All the Beautiful Things, with most praising the collaborations and production values; although some felt parts were too predictable. Matthew Meadow from Your EDM complimented the common themes shared between each track and The Music's Emma Salisbury felt that the "unique flavors" inhabited by the tracks led to a "well-curated, well-rounded work on a bed of exquisite production". The former selected "We Keep On Running" with Toto as his favourite track, citing the "powerful production" and the song's "plucky transform[ation] into distorted rock" at the drop. Hayden Manders of Nylon praised the songs where the DJ had "full control", notably the closing track "Us" which she described as a "cosmic journey through a couple's private life in a public sphere". The critic also described the record as a "fully packaged, uncompromised artistic vision", rather than "an electronic dance album filled with singles ripe for remixing but a fully packaged".

The collaborations with other musical artists were also widely praised, with Manders of Nylon writing that the artist collaborations "work to a satisfying extent" while Neil Z. Yeung from AllMusic commenting that the collaborations with the "inspired guests and fellow Aussies" resulted in a "pleasant journey through different pockets of electronic dance featuring a handful of synth throbbers and pretty electronic soundscapes". Hampson of Exclaim! also called the album's guests "inventive" and lauded the record's promising opening.

However, several elements of Not All The Beautiful Things were not as well received by critics, especially its predictability and tendency to sound clumped up. Exclaim!'s Hampson felt the record was predictable after its first two tracks, with songs "capitalizing on uninspired progressions and slopped in a grime we've heard the world over", while AllMusic's Yeung noted that sections of the album occasionally "sound like a mishmash of multiple artists vying for the same spotlight". Contrasting Your EDM's opinion, Hampson from Exclaim! gave a lukewarm reception to the Toto collaboration, calling it a "bad Top 40 anthem any number of at-the-moment pop stars might throw out."

In Australia, Not All the Beautiful Things peaked at number 14 on the ARIA Top 100 Albums chart, surpassing What So Not's previous extended play Divide & Conquer which hit number 19. On the ARIA Top 100 Physical Albums and ARIA Digital Albums charts, the record ranked at number twenty-five and number eight respectively. It then peaked at number four on the ARIA Australian Artists Albums chart, and number two on the ARIA Dance Albums chart. The single "Be Ok Again" climbed to number 19 on the ARIA Heatseekers chart, while the Volac, Zeke Beats and Kaz James remixes of "Beautiful" charted for eight weeks on the ARIA Club Tracks charts and peaked at number 17. On the Billboard Dance/Electronic Albums chart, the album peaked at number eight for one week.

== Track listing ==
Track list adapted from the iTunes Store, and credits adapted from the American Society of Composers, Authors and Publishers and Australasian Performing Right Association / Australasian Mechanical Copyright Owners Society.

No.	Title	Writer(s)	Producer(s)	Length
1.	"Warlord" (with Slumberjack)	Christopher Emerson; Sheng Yee Then; Fletcher Ehlers; Takudzwa Maidza	What So Not; Slumberjack; Cassian^{[c]}	2:55
2.	"Be Ok Again" (featuring Daniel Johns)	Emerson; Daniel Johns	What So Not	3:47
3.	"Beautiful" (featuring Winona Oak)	Emerson; Johanna Ekmark; Benjamin Berger; Ryan McMahon	What So Not; Chris Lake^{[a]}	3:45
4.	"Stuck In Orbit" (featuring Buoy)	Emerson; Ekmark; Jona Ma	What So Not; Ma	5:25
5.	"Demons" (with James Earl featuring Rome Fortune and Tommy Swisher)	Emerson; Noah Andoh; Jerome Fortune; Tommy Swisher	What So Not; Earl	2:29
6.	"Goh" (with Skrillex featuring KLP)	Emerson; Sonny Moore; Kirsty Lee Peters	What So Not; Skrillex	3:35
7.	"We Keep On Running" (with Toto)	Emerson; Surahn Sidhu; James Rushent; Jessica Higgs; David Paich; Steve Porcaro; Steve Lukather; Joseph Williams	What So Not; George Maple^{[a]}	4:39
8.	"If You Only Knew" (with San Holo featuring Daniel Johns)	Emerson; Johns; Sander van Dijck; Anna Lunoe	What So Not; San Holo	3:12
9.	"Monsters" (featuring Michael Christmas and Tobi Lou)	Emerson; Sidhu; Andrew Block; Russ Liquid; Michael Christmas; Tobi Lou	What So Not	3:01
10.	"Bottom End" (with Dyro)	Emerson; Jordy van Egmond; Mads Christensen; Alexander Flockheart; Mette Mortensen; Mark Pritchard; Thomas Yorke	What So Not; Dyro; Cassian^{[a]}; James Flannigan^{[a]}	3:11
11.	"Same Mistakes" (featuring Daniel Johns)	Emerson; Johns; Rushent	What So Not; Rushent^{[a]}	4:31
12.	"Us" (featuring Daniels)	Emerson; Jaramye Daniels; Georgia Overton	What So Not; Cassian^{[a]}	6:16
Total length:				46:46

=== Remix album ===
Track list adapted from the iTunes Store.

Remixes
No.	Title	Length
1.	"Stuck in Orbit" (Kidswaste Remix)	4:17
2.	"Goh" (Signal Remix)	3:51
3.	"Stuck in Orbit" (Luttrell Remix)	6:18
4.	"Beautiful" (Eskei83 Remix)	2:45
5.	"If You Only Knew" (12th Planet Remix)	3:31
6.	"Goh" (AC Slater Remix)	4:31
7.	"Beautiful" (Yvng Jalapeno Remix)	3:00
8.	"Goh" (Champagne Drip Remix)	3:37
9.	"If You Only Knew" (Graves Remix)	2:56
10.	"If You Only Knew" (Daktyl Remix)	2:36
11.	"Beautiful" (Marlo Remix)	4:26

== Personnel ==
Credits adapted from the album liner notes.

Technical credits

- Chris Emerson – arrangement, additional guitar (track 5), instrumentation, melody arrangement, production (all tracks), vocals (track 2)
- Sheng Yee Then – production (track 1)
- Fletcher Ehlers – production (track 1)
- Takudzwa Victoria Rosa Maidza – vocals (track 1)
- Cassian – additional production (track 1, 10, 12)
- Daniel Johns – arrangement, melody arrangement, vocals (tracks 2, 8, 11)
- Captain Cuts – arranger, melody arrangement, vocals (track 3)
- Chris Lake – additional production (track 3)
- Johanna Ekmark – melody arrangement, vocals (tracks 3, 4)
- Jono Ma – instrumentation, production (track 4)
- Charmian Kingston – melody arrangement, vocals (track 4)
- Noah Andoh – guitar (track 5)
- James Earl – production (track 5)
- James Flannigan – tape processing (track 4), additional production (track 10), arrangement (track 8), instrumentation (track 10)
- Jerome Fortune – melody arrangement, vocals (track 5)
- Tommy Swisher – melody arrangement, vocals (track 5)
- Kristy Lee Peters – melody arrangement, vocals (track 6)
- Sonny Moore – instrumentation, production (track 6)
- Trevor Lukather – instrumentation (track 7)
- James Rushent – additional production (track 11), instrumentation (track 7)
- Surahn Sidhu – instrumentation (track 7, 9)
- Anna Lunoe – melody arrangement, vocals (track 8)
- Sander van Dijck – instrumentation, production (track 8)
- Michael Christmas – melody arrangement, vocals (track 9)
- Russ Liquid – instrumentation (track 9)
- Andrew Block – instrumentation (track 9)
- Tobi Lou – vocals (track 9)
- Jordy van Egmond – instrumentation, production (track 10)
- Mads Christensen – melody arrangement, vocals (track 10)
- Alex Flockheart – melody arrangement, vocals (track 10)
- Mette Mortensen – melody arrangement, vocals (track 10)
- Jaramye Jael Daniels – melody arrangement, vocals (track 12)
- Luke Eblen – artwork

Recording personnel

- Dale Becker – mastering (all tracks)
- Cassian – mixing (all tracks)
- James Rushent – engineer (track 7)
- Damien Weatherley – engineer (track 7)
- Chris Emerson – synthesiser (track 12)
- Luke Emerson – synthesiser (track 12)
- Daniel Pliner – synthesiser (track 12)

== Charts ==
Chart (2018)	Peak position
Australian Albums (ARIA)	14
US Top Dance Albums (Billboard)	8

== Release history ==
Country	Date	Label	Format	Ref
UK	9 March 2018	Counter Records	Digital download	
UK	9 March 2018	Counter Records	CD	
Australia	9 March 2018	Sweat It Out / Counter Records	LP	
