= Emotion Sickness =

Song by Silverchair

Song by Silverchair

from the album Neon Ballroom
- Released: 8 March 1999
- Genre: Alternative rock
- Length: 6:01
- Label: Murmur, Epic
- Songwriter(s): Daniel Johns
- Producer(s): Nick Launay

"Emotion Sickness" is a song by the Australian alternative rock band Silverchair. It was released as the first song on their 1999 album Neon Ballroom. At 6 minutes long, it is the band's third-longest song. Australian pianist David Helfgott makes a guest appearance on the song, along with the Sydney Symphony Orchestra. In a 1999 interview with Metal Hammer, Daniel Johns said that "Emotion Sickness" is his favorite Silverchair song.

Although the song is not typical of Silverchair's work, "Emotion Sickness" is a fan favorite.

== Background ==
For "Emotion Sickness", the band's frontman, Daniel Johns, wanted "a really manic and broken piano part to break up the album". The band's management had the idea to call Australian pianist David Helfgott, who also shared the same lawyer with Silverchair, and the band agreed without hesitation. "Daniel wanted a manic piano part. It suited the song. He wanted it so it wasn't typical - didn't want something that was nice and kinda polished. He wanted something that was manic and off-chords. David Helfgott was the perfect man for the job", bassist Chris Joannou said. The Sydney Symphony Orchestra is also featured in the song.

Daniel Johns said about the song:

It's about fighting against the need to get some kind of medication and trying to pretend that you've got a normal state of mind when you know for a fact that you haven't."

== Music video ==
The music video was directed by Cate Anderson, who also directed the video for "Ana's Song". It features Australian actor Dai Paterson.

== Reception ==
Neva Chonin of Rolling Stone called the song "mopey" and said that when the song's last words are "lessons learned," "it’s hard to suppress a sigh at the overt lyrical reference to Kurt Cobain's 'Dumb'". Chonin also called the orchestration lavish.

== Covers ==
The song was covered by Australian rock band Storm the Sky on the 2017 Silverchair cover album Spawn (Again).

== Personnel ==
- Daniel Johns – vocals, guitar
- Ben Gillies – drums
- Chris Joannou – bass

Additional personnel

- David Helfgott – piano
- Larry Muhoberac – piano arrangement
- Sydney Symphony Orchestra – strings
