= Christy (soundtrack) =

Christy (Original Motion Picture Soundtrack)

Film score by Antony Partos
- Released: November 7, 2025
- Recorded: 2025
- Genre: Film score
- Length: 55:20
- Label: Milan
- Producer: Antony Partos

Antony Partos chronology
| Deeper (2025) | Christy (2025) | Edge of Life (2025) |

Christy (Original Motion Picture Soundtrack) is the film score to the 2025 film Christy directed by David Michôd based on the life of professional boxer Christy Martin starring Sydney Sweeney. The film score is composed by Antony Partos and released through Milan Records on November 7, 2025.

== Background ==
In July 2025, it was announced that Antony Partos would compose the musical score for Christy after previously working with Michôd on Animal Kingdom (2010) and The Rover (2014). Partos described the score had provided the emotional weight the film which demanded apart from the performances, and it took on the mind of Martin and her tumultuous personal experiences. The score emphasized more orchestral and electronic elements from the 1980s.

== Release ==
The film's soundtrack was released through Milan Records on November 7, 2025.

== Reception ==
Mick LaSalle of San Francisco Chronicle wrote "composer Antony Partos' soundtrack is at times bizarre." Sonia Rao of The Washington Post called it "overbearing". David Rooney of The Hollywood Reporter noted that "there's not a lot of poetry in the fight scenes, despite Michôd mixing in ecclesiastical choral music with Antony Partos' score." Chris Bumbray of JoBlo.com wrote "Antony Partos's score, recalling much of his earlier Australian collaborations with Michôd, adds further depth." Nick Schager of The Daily Beast wrote "Throw in Antony Partos's alternately sad and uplifting score, and you have a veritable smorgasbord of hoary conventions." Anthony McPhelim of The Heights wrote "Antony Partos stands firm as the composer". Owen Gleiberman of Variety and Robert Daniels of Screen International considered the score to be "fascinating" and "foreboding".

== Track listing ==
| No. | Title | Length |
|---|---|---|
| 1. | "Christy, This Is You" | 1:34 |
| 2. | "Bristol Speedway" | 1:30 |
| 3. | "Pink Robe" | 2:55 |
| 4. | "Rosie" | 1:35 |
| 5. | "Itmann, WV" | 3:22 |
| 6. | "Daytona Beach" | 1:16 |
| 7. | "Extra Cash" | 3:23 |
| 8. | "Vegas" | 5:11 |
| 9. | "That Morning's Gonna Come" | 0:50 |
| 10. | "Corridor" | 2:01 |
| 11. | "Lisa" | 2:03 |
| 12. | "Mississippi" | 3:14 |
| 13. | "Laila" | 2:51 |
| 14. | "Sunshine" | 1:37 |
| 15. | "Peril" | 3:01 |
| 16. | "I'm Going Home" | 7:19 |
| 17. | "Apopka, FL" | 3:16 |
| 18. | "Escape" | 3:55 |
| 19. | "Look Where I Am" | 1:43 |
| 20. | "C'mon, Papi" | 2:37 |
| Total length: | | 55:20 |

== Accolades ==
| Award | Date of ceremony | Category | Recipient(s) | Result | Ref. |
|---|---|---|---|---|---|
| Hollywood Music in Media Awards | November 19, 2025 | Best Original Score – Independent Film | Antony Partos | Pending | |
