= If You Keep Losing Sleep =

2007 single by Silverchair

Single by Silverchair

from the album Young Modern
- Released: 9 October 2007
- Recorded: 2006
- Genre: Alternative rock, neo-psychedelia
- Length: 3:20
- Label: Eleven Records
- Songwriter: Daniel Johns
- Producers: Nick Launay; David Bottrill; Daniel Johns

Silverchair singles chronology
"Reflections of a Sound" (2007)	"If You Keep Losing Sleep" (2007)	"Mind Reader" (2008)

Audio sample
- A 20 second sample from "If You Keep Losing Sleep": file; help

"If You Keep Losing Sleep" is a song by Australian band Silverchair from their fifth album Young Modern, released on 9 October 2007. It was the third single in Australia to be released from the album. It was released worldwide as the second single from the album, since "Reflections of a Sound" was only available as a single in Australia. On 30 September, the band performed the song live on the talk show Rove, hosted by Rove McManus, taking elements from the song's video and bringing them into the performance. "If You Keep Losing Sleep" peaked at 16 on the official ARIA single charts in Australia.

== Music video ==
The music video for the single premiered on Channel Seven's Sunrise program on 28 August 2007. It was directed by Damon Escott and Stephen Lance and producer Leanne Tonkes, who also directed the "Reflections of a Sound" video. The band described the video as their most "electrifying" video ever made, in reference to the lightning-bolt special effects throughout the video. The visual effects in the clip were produced by Brisbane-based visual effects company Liquid VFX (a division of the internationally successful animation company Liquid Animation). Escott and Lance describe the clip as "Busby Berkeley meets Frankenstein. A demented toy box of Broadway horror".

Molly Meldrum described it as "the best video I've seen from Australia ever" while discussing music with David Koch and Mel on Sunrise in August 2007.

The Damon Escott and Stephen Lance directed music video was nominated for Best Video at the ARIA Music Awards of 2008.

== Reception ==
The Guardian said, "Silverchair find themselves in a nightmarish Willy Wonka world of baton-twirling, candy-crunching, bubble-machines, blowing zany melodies at crazed carnival barkers, as Oompa Loompas stomp in concert with the kick drum. It's the furthest they travelled from the erstwhile grunge of their first album."

== Track listing ==
Australia CD Single (ELEVENCD76)

1. "If You Keep Losing Sleep"
2. "We're Not Lonely But We Miss You"
3. "Barbarella"

Australian iTunes Single

1. "If You Keep Losing Sleep"
2. "We're Not Lonely But We Miss You"
3. "Barbarella"
4. "Hide Under Your Tongue"

== Charts ==
Chart (2007)	Peak position
Australian Singles Chart	16
