= Findaway =

Findaway may refer to:

- a song by Silverchair, from their album Frogstomp (1995)
- an audiobook distributor owned by Spotify
