= Robert Grayson (comedian) =

American comedian

Robert Grayson was born in New York and lived in Australia (including Ocean Shores)for many years. He died in February 2022.

Under the name Silverpram, in October 1995 he released a parody EP titled Frogstamp, a parody of Silverchair's 1995 debut album Frogstomp, which included a song based on Silverchair's "Tomorrow" titled "(I Turn Four) Tomorrow". The song was nominated for the 1996 ARIA Award for Best Comedy Release and reached No. 72 on the ARIA singles chart. The song was called "a heap of crap" by The Sydney Morning Herald's Emma Tom.

== Discography ==
=== Extended plays ===
Extended play, with selected details and chart positions
Title	Details	Peak chart positions
Title	Details	AUS
Frogstamp	Released: October 1995; Label: Shock (SHOCK-HA009); Format: CD	72

== Awards and nominations ==
=== ARIA Music Awards ===
The ARIA Music Awards are a set of annual ceremonies presented by Australian Recording Industry Association (ARIA), which recognise excellence, innovation, and achievement across all genres of the music of Australia. They commenced in 1987.

Year	Nominee / work	Award	Result	Ref.
1996	Frogstamp	Best Comedy Release	Nominated	
