= Reflections of a Sound =

2007 single by Silverchair

Single by Silverchair

from the album Young Modern
- Released: 14 July 2007
- Recorded: 2006
- Genre: Alternative rock, art rock
- Length: 4:09
- Label: Eleven Records
- Songwriter(s): Daniel Johns
- Producer(s): Nick Launay; David Bottrill; Daniel Johns

Silverchair singles chronology
"Straight Lines" (2007)	"Reflections of a Sound" (2007)	"If You Keep Losing Sleep" (2007)

"Reflections of a Sound"
A 25 second sample from "Reflections of a Sound"

"Reflections of a Sound" is a song by Australian rock band Silverchair and is the fourth track on their fifth studio album Young Modern, released in March 2007. The song was released on 14 July 2007 as the second single from that album. The single was only released in Australia in digital format.

== Music video ==
The music video for the single premiered on 8 June 2007. It was shot in Queensland by directing duo Damon Escott and Stephen Lance and their producer Leanne Tonkes. Like the album art for Young Modern, is heavily influenced by the "De Stijl" art movement. References to other artists such as Dalí, Da Vinci, Magritte, Mondrian and Warhol are also made. Post-production by Corner Post (Sydney).

== Track listing ==
Australian Digital release

1. "Reflections of a Sound"
2. "Straight Lines (live from Carriageworks Album Launch)"
3. "Mind Reader (live from Carriageworks Album Launch)"
4. "Luv Your Life (live from Carriageworks Album Launch) (iTunes Store only)"

Australian Promo CD (ELEVENCDPRO72)

1. "Reflections of a Sound"
- This single comes in a semi-clear 5" Cd, housed in a cardboard sleeve.
