= Mind Reader (Silverchair song) =

2008 single by Silverchair

Single by Silverchair

from the album Young Modern
- Released: 23 February 2008
- Recorded: 2006
- Genre: Alternative rock; hard rock
- Length: 3:07
- Label: Eleven Records
- Songwriters: Daniel Johns, Julian Hamilton
- Producers: Nick Launay; David Bottrill; Daniel Johns

Silverchair singles chronology
| "If You Keep Losing Sleep" (2007) | "Mind Reader" (2008) |

"Mind Reader" is a song by Australian rock band, Silverchair, from their fifth studio album, Young Modern. The song was sent to Australian radio stations in January 2008 and released as the fourth and final single from the album. The song was co-written by the group's lead singer-guitarist, Daniel Johns, with Julian Hamilton of The Presets, who is responsible for the "don't know what you want" chorus. The single was released on 23 February 2008, as a digital download. It was the last Silverchair single – the group have been on an "indefinite hiatus" from May 2011.

== Reception ==
Danielle O'Donoghue caught their live performance in May 2007 in Adelaide and felt that their "[n]ew song 'Mind Reader' fitted in well with the band's heavier rock past". Sean Lynch reviewed Young Modern for WebWombat and noted that there were times when Johns' vocals became annoying "you wish you could pull Johns aside and just say 'Mate, you sound like a dickhead - use that voice of yours and stop fucking up a potentially great song' (most notably on 'Mind Reader')". Matt Neal of The Standard rated Young Modern at No. 15 in his list of Top 100 Albums of '00s and praised the "deranged riffing" of "Mind Reader".

== Track listing ==
Australian Promo (ELEVENCDPRO81)

1. "Mind Reader"
2. "Mind Reader" (live from Across the Great Divide)

iTunes single

1. "Mind Reader"
2. "Mind Reader" (live video)

== Music video ==
The live music video was footage from the Across the Great Divide tour in Melbourne.
