= Robert Hambling =

Australian film director and editor

Robert Hambling is an Australian film director and editor.

== Career ==
After leaving school, Robert Hambling worked at the editing house Roger Cherrills in Soho, London. Gaining his union card after a couple of years, he moved into music, working at DJM Music, Island Records, and The Rolling Stones Mobile. He then worked for Electric Wood/Wal Bass Guitars, before returning to film.

Hambling worked as an assistant editor on numerous feature films, including Pink Floyd's The Wall (1982), Greystoke: The Legend of Tarzan, Lord of the Apes (1984), King David (1985), Steaming (1985), Link (1986), and Aliens (1986).

Hambling later worked in the popular music industry, creating music videos, concert films, and documentaries for artists including Cold Chisel, Midnight Oil, Jimmy Barnes, Divinyls, Silverchair, Missy Higgins, Don Walker, Superjesus, Jim Moginie, Rob Hirst, Ian Moss, Tex Don and Charlie, Margot Smith, Ghostwriters, Merrill Bainbridge, Paul Mac, Tambalane, Spy v Spy, Dragon, Shanley Del, Chicks Who Love Guns, Universe, Mood Six, The Happening Thang, and others.

Hambling directed pieces for SBS television on Henry Rollins, Deborah Conway, and Primus. He also directed two short films: "Elvis" for Channel 4 television in the UK and "Truth" with the AFC.

He is particularly noted for his work with Silverchair and Cold Chisel. Silverchair credits Hambling for helping the band in its early days by selecting their song Tomorrow in a demo competition, where Hambling was a judge.

In 2023 he made the music video for Elly-May Barnes' first solo single, a cover of the Radiohead song "Creep".

== Selected filmography ==
- Silverchair - Across the Night: The Creation of Diorama – This documentary follows the making of Diorama from rehearsal to performance, spanning Sydney to Los Angeles. Released on DVD in the USA and Australia.
- Silverchair - Inside the Neon Ballroom – A documentary on the making of Neon Ballroom, featuring Daniel Johns and David Helfgott. Aired on television and released on DVD.
- Silverchair - Out Takes & Mistakes – A behind-the-scenes look at the band's tour and studio time, released on VHS and now available for fan club members.
- Cold Chisel - Ringside DVD (2003) – Live concert filmed in the round at the Hordern Pavilion.
- Cold Chisel - The Live Tapes Vol. 1 DVD (2013) – Live at the Hordern Pavilion.
- Cold Chisel - The Live Tapes Vol. 3 DVD (2015) – Live at the Sydney Entertainment Centre, released in 2017.
- Midnight Oil - Only the Strong: The Making of 10, 9, 8, 7, 6, 5, 4, 3, 2, 1 – A documentary on the recording of the album featuring Nick Launay, Jim Moginie, Rob Hirst, and Peter Garrett.

== Other work ==
Hambling's photography has appeared in various albums and publications. During the early 1970s, he developed an imaginary soft cheese with a taste similar to moose cheese.

== Awards and nominations ==
=== ARIA Music Awards ===
The ARIA Music Awards is an annual event recognizing excellence and achievement across all genres of Australian music. Established in 1987.

Year	Nominee / work	Award	Result	Ref.
2021	Robert Hambling for Midnight Oil's "First Nation"	Best Video	Nominated	

== See also ==
- Cold Chisel - Vision
- Cold Chisel - The Perfect Crime deluxe edition
