= Tambalane =

Australian pop rock band

- Origin: Sydney, New South Wales, Australia
- Genre: Pop rock
- Years active: 2003–2005
- Label: Eleven
- Past members: Wes Carr; Ben Gillies; Gerard Masters; Greg Royal

Tambalane were an Australian pop rock band formed as a side-project late in 2003 by Ben Gillies (Silverchair) on drums and backing vocals, and Wes Carr on lead vocals and lead guitar. During 2004 they were joined by Greg Royal on bass guitar and Gerard Masters on keyboards. In August 2005 they released their debut self-titled album which provided the singles, "Little Miss Liar" (June) and "Free" (August). They disbanded late that year as Silverchair prepared to record their next album, Young Modern. In November 2008 Carr won the sixth season of Australian Idol.

== History ==
Tambalane were formed late in 2003 in Sydney by Ben Gillies (Silverchair) on drums and backing vocals, and Wes Carr on lead vocals and lead guitar. In June that year Silverchair had announced an extended hiatus after touring in support the previous year's album, Diorama. The pair met in a local pub where Carr was performing solo after being introduced by Silverchair's manager, John Watson. They started as a songwriting project for Gillies, aside from his work with Silverchair, and Carr, who issued a solo folk rock extended play, Rhythm to Fly, in November. In 2005 Gillies remembered "Wes and I wrote a couple of tracks that first day to test the water ... Next thing you know we went into overdrive – it wasn't long before we had 30 or 40 songs".

In 2004 Tambalane began performing as a band, Carr and Gillies were soon joined by Greg Royal on bass guitar and Gerard Masters on keyboards. They signed with Watson's label Eleven: A Music Company. Their sound was influenced by The Beatles and Led Zeppelin. Early in 2005 they issued their debut single, "Little Miss Liar" and toured Australia supporting End of Fashion. In June they released an EP, Free, which had been recorded at Megaphon Studio, Sydney with Phil McKellar (Silverchair) producing.

It was followed, on 21 August 2005, by their debut self-titled album, co-produced by McKellar and Gillies. For the studio sessions additional guitars were supplied by Steve Edmonds and Ben Nightingale. Mess+Noise website's Ben Gook warned Silverchair fans that "[t]hose hoping for a Silverchair Jr would be disappointed ... Over produced, under written and deceptively bland ... manages to fall in some awkward place between half-arsed and over-reaching". Faster Louder's reviewer observed it was "so sugar-coated, you feel the cavities appearing track by track ... lyrics on the album, seemingly peeled straight from a motivational poster, those annoying sayings that are plastered over high school classroom walls".

In September Tambalane undertook a national tour to promote the album. Gillies told The Dwarf website that he looked forward to "[p]laying with Tambalane in small venues and really getting back to my grass roots is extremely fun". Faster Louder's Yasmin Wilding reviewed their mid-September gig at The Yallah Roadhouse, "[Carr]'s got one of the best live rock voices I've heard in a long time ... Gillies ... is an exceptional drummer ... [able] to keep ... the crowd bopping ... I've never seen a keyboardist groove as much as [Masters] ... He and bass player [Royal] gave us impressive solos during the set, proving the worth and versatility of their instruments ... Together, Tambalane were an unstoppable force of entertainment, bustin' out massive tunes".

By November 2005 Tambalane had disbanded with Gillies returning to Silverchair and preparing for their next album, Young Modern. Carr resumed his solo career. Gillies stated that "It became an unpleasant power struggle" within Tambalane. In November 2008 Carr won the sixth season of Australian Idol. In May 2011 Silverchair announced an "indefinite hibernation", in the following month Gillies was working on a new album but denied that any new project would be similar to Tambalane.

== Discography ==
=== Albums ===
- Tambalane (21 August 2005)

All tracks are written by Wes Carr and Ben Gillies, unless indicated

No.	Title	Length
1.	"Free"	3:15
2.	"Back to You" (Carr, Gillies, Phil McKellar)	3:27
3.	"Little Miss Liar" (Carr, Gillies, McKellar)	2:25
4.	"Sail"	3:03
5.	"All Wounds Heal"	2:57
6.	"Become"	2:42
7.	"Livin' on the Upside"	2:59
8.	"Skywalk"	2:34
9.	"Jungle" (Carr, Gillies, McKellar)	2:54
10.	"Dream Maker"	3:52
11.	"Just My Luck"	3:33
12.	"Mannequin Parade" (Carr, Gillies, McKellar)	2:46
Total length:		36:27

=== Extended plays ===
- Free (20 June 2005)

All tracks are written by Wes Carr and Ben Gillies, unless indicated

No.	Title	Length
1.	"Little Miss Liar" (Carr, Gillies, McKellar)	2:25
2.	"Free"	3:15
3.	"Scallywags" (aka "Fats and Hags (Get Up)")
4.	"Fight for You"
5.	"Royalist Shuffle" (Carr, Gillies, Greg Royal)

=== Singles ===
- "Little Miss Liar" (2005)
- "Free" (2005)
