= Israel's Son =

1995 single by Silverchair

Single by Silverchair

from the album Frogstomp
- Released: 17 April 1995
- Studio: Festival (Pyrmont, Australia)
- Genre: Grunge; hard rock
- Length: 5:18
- Label: Murmur
- Songwriter: Daniel Johns
- Producer: Kevin "Caveman" Shirley

Silverchair singles chronology
"Pure Massacre" (1995)	"Israel's Son" (1995)	"Shade" (1995)

"Israel's Son" is a song by Australian rock band Silverchair. It was released as the third single from their debut studio album, Frogstomp (1995). The song was included on the band's first compilation album, The Best Of: Volume 1 (2000). In April 2022, The Guardian ranked "Israel's Son" at No. 8 on their "The 25 best Silverchair songs – sorted" list.

== Origin ==
Vocalist and guitarist Daniel Johns said about the song in an interview with Request Magazine in November 1995:

That [song] was about an execution I saw on tele. I got this video of an execution, and I just saw it, and I was watching it one night, and I had a dream about it, and I woke up and thought, 'Oh yeah, that's pretty cool', and I wrote a song about it.

== Music video ==
A music video, directed by Nigel Dick, was made for the song, with filming taking place at Rancho Maria in Canyon Country, California, on 19 December 1995.

== 1995 concert bottling incident ==
On 17 September 1995, Johns was hit with a bottle of alcohol while Silverchair performed "Israel's Son" at Santa Monica Pier in Santa Monica, California, during a U.S. tour; the injury required six stitches around his left eyebrow.

== 1996 murder trial ==
In a January 1996 murder case, the defendant counsel for Brian Bassett, 16, and Nicholaus McDonald, 18, of McCleary, Washington, claimed that the pair listened to "Israel's Son", from Frogstomp, which contributed to the murders of Bassett's parents and a younger brother on 10 August 1995. McDonald's lawyer cited the lyrics "'Hate is what I feel for you/I want you to know that I want you dead'" which were "almost a script. They're relevant to everything that happened".

The band's manager, John Watson, was quoted as stating on behalf of Silverchair:

"Silverchair do not, have not, and never would condone violence of any sort. The band is appalled by this horrific crime and they hope that justice will prevail in prosecuting whoever is responsible for it. The band extends its sincere sympathies to the families and friends of the victims in this case. Silverchair absolutely rejects any allegation that their song is in any way responsible for the actions of the alleged murders. It is a matter of public record that the song in question, Israel's Son, was inspired by a television documentary about wartime atrocities. Israel's Son was never intended to provoke violence and cannot be interpreted by any reasonable person as doing so. In fact, the song seeks to criticise violence and war by portraying them in all their horror."

Prosecutors rejected the defence case and convinced the jury that the murder was committed to "steal money and belongings and run off to California."

== Track listing ==
Israel's Son CD/MC EP (Australian version) (MATTCD012)/(MATTC012)

1. "Israel's Son"
2. "Blind" (live)
3. "Leave Me Out" (live)
4. "Undecided" (live)

== Charts ==
Chart (1995)	Peak position
Australia (ARIA)	11
New Zealand (RIANZ)	12
US Album Rock Tracks (Billboard)	39

== Certifications ==
Region	Certification	Certified units/sales
Australia (ARIA)	Gold	35,000^{‡}
^{‡} Sales+streaming figures based on certification alone.

== Release history ==
Release dates and formats for "Israel's Son"
Region	Date	Format(s)	Label(s)	Ref.
Australia	17 April 1995	CD; cassette	Murmur	
