= Aerial Love =

2015 debut single by Daniel Johns

Single by Daniel Johns

from the album Talk
- Released: 29 January 2015
- Genre: Trip hop, neo soul
- Length: 3:34
- Label: Eleven: A Music Company
- Songwriters: Daniel Johns, Joel Little
- Producers: Daniel Johns, Joel Little

Daniel Johns singles chronology
"Impossible" (2014)	"Aerial Love" (2015)	"Cool on Fire" (2015)

Music video
- "Aerial Love" on YouTube

"Aerial Love" is the debut solo single by Australian recording artist Daniel Johns. It was released on 29 January 2015 as the lead single from his debut solo studio album, Talk. It peaked at number 21 on the Australian ARIA Charts.

== Background ==
Johns said the song "is about loneliness, sex and uninhibited love." In speaking with Today, Johns said "It's taken so long to release new music because when we decided to take a break from Silverchair, I took time to step away from the spotlight and just craft a little bit. The video is me on my own personal journey through a desert which is [a] metaphor for loneliness and discovering a world of sexual being and a world of uninhibited love."

== Music video ==
The music video was directed by Lorin Askill and was filmed on the Stockton Dunes just outside of Newcastle, New South Wales, and has been designed to mirror "the song's weightless, timeless, slyly carnal feel".

== Reception ==
auspOp described the song as "gorgeous, slick, stripped-back, smooth and soft and melds beautifully with Daniel's delicate vocal."

Monica Tan from The Guardian described the song as "a soft and slow, soulful ballad... that sees Johns alternate between a sultry croon and a nicely controlled falsetto over a throbbing drum beat."

== Accolades ==
At the ARIA Music Awards of 2015, the song was nominated for Best Video.

The song was shortlisted for Song of the Year at the APRA Music Awards of 2016.

== Track listings ==
Digital download
No.	Title	Length
1.	"Aerial Love"	3:34

CD single (ELEVENCD122)
No.	Title	Length
1.	"Preach"	3:51
2.	"Aerial Love"	3:34
3.	"Surrender"	4:16
4.	"Late Night Drive"	3:05

== Charts ==
Chart (2015)	Peak position
Australia (ARIA)	21
