= Moxie Raia =

American singer

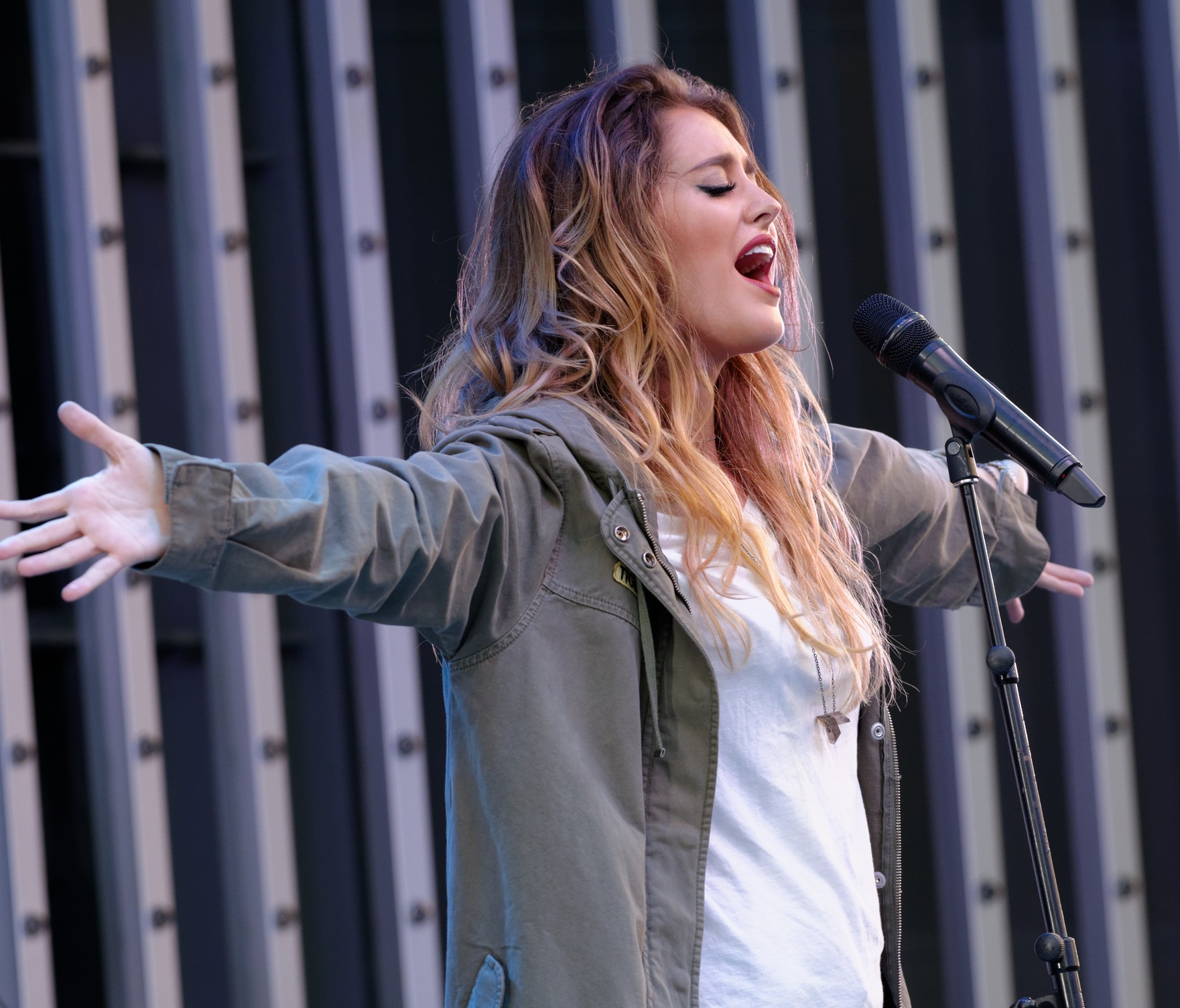
- Raia performing in 2014

Background information
- Born: Laura Raia; May 12, 1990 (age 36); Queens, New York, United States
- Genres: R&B, hip hop, pop
- Occupations: Singer; songwriter
- Years active: 2013–present
- Labels: Capitol, Brain House
- Website: http://www.moxieraia.com/

Laura Raia (born May 12, 1990), known professionally as Moxie Raia, is an American singer-songwriter. She is of Italian descent. Her first mixtape 931 featuring artists like Pusha T, Wyclef Jean and Post Malone was released in March 2016. The second single from the mixtape, "On My Mind" featuring T, reached No. 42 on Spotify's Viral 50 tracks in March 2016.

== Early life ==
Raia began her career as a professional dancer and songwriter before she was a teenager. At the age of 13, she moved to New York City and enrolled in the Professional Children's School. After studying jazz at Columbia University, Raia moved to Los Angeles and signed up with Capitol Records for a cover of Big Sean's "Beware".

== Career ==
Shortly after signing up with Capitol, Raia released her first single, "Buffalo Bill". Moxie has an album, 931, featuring 10 songs.

In March 2016, she was named as an opening act for the North American leg of Justin Bieber's Purpose World Tour.

== Discography ==
=== Album appearances ===
List of other non-single song appearances
Title	Year	Album
"I Love It When You Cry" (with Steve Aoki)	2015	Neon Future II
"I Feel Electric" (with Daniel Johns)	2022	FutureNever
