= Talk (Daniel Johns album) =

2015 album by Daniel Johns

Studio album by Daniel Johns
- Released: 22 May 2015
- Recorded: 2013–2014
- Genre: Neo soul
- Length: 60:24
- Label: Eleven
- Producers: Daniel Johns; Joel Little; Julian Hamilton; Damn Moroda; Louis Schoorl; M-Phazes; Styalz Fuego

Daniel Johns chronology
Talk (2015)	FutureNever (2022)

Singles from Talk
- 1. "Aerial Love" Released: 29 January 2015; 2. "Cool on Fire" Released: 22 May 2015; 3. "Going on 16" Released: 2 August 2015

Talk is the debut studio album by Australian artist Daniel Johns. It was his first full-length musical project since the hiatus of Silverchair and was announced in May 2011, but the album was not released until 22 May 2015 by record label Eleven, and it debuted at No. 2 on the Australian ARIA Albums Chart. The tracks "Aerial Love", "Cool on Fire" and "Going on 16" were released as singles.

== Recording ==
Talk was created over the course of 2013 and 2014, with Johns actively pursuing a sleek neo soul R&B feel, influenced by artists such as Janet Jackson. While working with long-time collaborator Julian Hamilton, Johns also engaged the involvement of numerous production personnel—such as Lorde producer Joel Little—as well as Styalz Fuego and M-Phazes.

== Release ==
A four-song single, "Aerial Love", featuring two tracks—"Aerial Love" and "Preach"—that would feature on the album, was released on 13 March 2015, reaching No. 21 in the Australian singles chart, giving Johns his first solo hit. Talk was released on 22 May 2015 by record label Eleven in Johns' native Australia, and worldwide in digital and CD formats. It reached number 2 on the Australian ARIA Albums Chart.

== Reception ==
Professional ratings
Review scores
Source	Rating
AllMusic	4/5 stars

Like much of Johns' work, Talk marked a dramatic shift in musical styles, garnering polarised feedback from fans, although critical reactions were warm. In his review for AllMusic, Neil Z. Yeung declared that, Talk "is cohesive, ebbing and flowing as the grooves pulsate and Johns' lyrics of love and lust hypnotize. This is the sound of a grown man taking a stand, declaring his identity as an evolving artist in a new era."

== Track listing ==
All tracks are written by Daniel Johns, except as noted.

No.	Title	Length
1.	"Aerial Love" (Johns, Joel Little)	3:35
2.	"We Are Golden" (Johns, Damn Moroda)	4:40
3.	"By Your Side" (Johns, Julian Hamilton)	3:48
4.	"Preach" (Johns, Moroda)	3:52
5.	"Too Many" (Johns, Louis Schoorl)	4:26
6.	"Cool on Fire" (Johns, Little)	3:03
7.	"Imagination" (Johns, M-Phazes)	4:42
8.	"Dissolve" (Johns, Hamilton)	3:52
9.	"Chained" (Johns, Styalz Fuego)	4:33
10.	"Sleepwalker" (Johns, Moroda)	3:39
11.	"Faithless" (Johns, Fuego)	4:30
12.	"Warm Hands" (Johns, Little)	3:49
13.	"Going on 16"	3:29
14.	"New York"	4:33
15.	"Good Luck"	3:42

== Personnel ==
- Daniel Johns – vocals, keyboards, guitars
- Maxime Bibeau – bass
- Satu Vänskä – violin
- Ilya Isakovich – violin
- Christopher Moore – viola
- Alexandru-Mihai Bota – viola
- Julian Thompson – cello
- Timo-Veikko Valve – cello
- Julian Hamilton – keyboards
- Damian – keyboards
- The Australian Chamber Orchestra – strings

== Charts ==
Chart (2015)	Peak position
Australian Albums (ARIA)	2
