= Sonar Music =

Australian music production company

Sonar Music is an Australian music production company.

== History ==
Sonar Music was founded in 2010 by composers Antony Partos, Andrew Lancaster, Matteo Zingales, David McCormack, Michael Lira, andJono Ma, along with music producer Wes Chew.

== Description and people ==
It is a music production house that provides original music composition and arrangements to all forms of media, including feature films, commercials, TV series, documentaries, installations, and interactive media.

Sonar Music is situated at Disney Studios Australia. Its current board of directors are Antony Partos, Andrew Lancaster, Matteo Zingales, Jono Ma, and David McCormack.

== Awards ==
Year	Award	Production
2016	AACTA Award Best Original Music for a Documentary	Sherpa
2015	APRA/AGSC Screen Music Award Best Original Music for a Documentary	Sherpa
2015	Nomination, AACTA Award for Best Original Music Score	The Rover
2014	AACTA Award For Best Original Music Score in Television	Redfern Now Series 2
2014	APRA/AGSC SCREEN MUSIC AWARD Best Original Song For The Screen	'Don't Let Go' from Rake
2013	APRA/AGSC SCREEN MUSIC AWARD Best Original Song Composed for the Screen	'Lonely Child' from Redfern Now
2013	APRA/AGSC SCREEN MUSIC AWARD Best Music for a TV Series	Redfern Now
2013	AACTA Award For Best Original Music Score	Not Suitable for Children
2012	APRA/AGSC SCREEN MUSIC AWARD Best Television Theme	The Slap
2012	APRA/AGSC SCREEN MUSIC AWARD Best Soundtrack Album	The Slap
2012	APRA/AGSC SCREEN MUSIC AWARD Best Music for a Mini-Series or Telemovie	MABO
2012	AACTA Award Best Original Music Score	The Hunter
2011	AGSC Award for Best Music for a Documentary	Lachlan Macquarie: Father of Australia
2011	SCREEN MUSIC AWARDS AUSTRALIA Best Music for a Television series or serial	Rake
2010	AFI Award Best Original Music Score	Animal Kingdom
