= David Helfgott =

Australian concert pianist (born 1947)

David Helfgott OAM
- Born: 19 May 1947 (age 79); Melbourne, Victoria, Australia
- Occupation: Pianist
- Spouses: Claire Papp (m. 1971; div. 1974) Gillian Murray (m. 1984; died 2022)

David Helfgott (born 19 May 1947) is an Australian concert pianist. His life inspired the 1996 film Shine, in which he was portrayed by actors Geoffrey Rush, Noah Taylor and Alex Rafalowicz.

== Life and career ==
=== Early life ===
Helfgott was born in Melbourne to Polish Jewish parents Rachel (née Granek) and Elias Peter Helfgott. He won the state final of the ABC Instrumental and Vocal Competition.

=== London studies and mental illness ===
The awards he won at the Royal College of Music included the Dannreuther Prize for Best Concerto Performance, for his performance of Rachmaninoff's Piano Concerto No. 3, and the Marmaduke Barton Prize.

During his time in London, he began showing more definite manifestations of schizoaffective disorder. He returned to Perth in 1970. The following year, he married Hungarian Jewish immigrant Claire Papp, who had four children. He worked as a rehearsal pianist for the West Australian Opera.

In 1983, his brother Les Helfgott found him a job working at a Perth wine bar called Riccardo's. The co-owner of the bar was a doctor, Chris Reynolds, who played a significant part in Helfgott's rehabilitation and also introduced him to Gillian Murray, whom Helfgott married in 1984.

=== Shine ===
Helfgott was the subject of the 1996 film Shine, which dealt with the pianist's formative years and struggle with mental illness. Helfgott was portrayed by actors Geoffrey Rush (adult), Noah Taylor (teenager) and Alex Rafalowicz (child). Rush won numerous accolades for his performance, including the Academy Award for Best Actor. Helfgott's brother Les has described the portrayal of their father in both Shine and in Gillian Helfgott's biography as "all outright lies". David Helfgott's first wife Claire Papp has also said that Peter Helfgott was "quite badly maligned" in the film.

In a letter to the editor of Limelight, published in the September 2013 edition, Margaret and Les Helfgott refer to certain claims made in an article in the August 2013 edition and state that "there was no estrangement from members of Helfgott's family following his return to Australia. On the contrary, he moved straight back into the family home, and was cared for by our family. Dad was not 'overbearing', and his main objection to David's going abroad was his concern for his son's welfare."

=== Later musical career ===
Helfgott generally prefers to perform Romantic music, mostly Mussorgsky, Rachmaninoff, Chopin, Liszt, Schumann and Rimsky-Korsakov. However, his recordings and performances, especially that of Rachmaninoff's Piano Concerto No. 3, have been criticized as "pallid, erratic and incoherent." Of the two commercial recordings released by RCA, the American journal Fanfare Magazine was critical not only of Helfgott himself, but also of his producers, who were "marketing Helfgott's pain." The British magazine Gramophone was similarly scathing about the exploitative nature of their issue, which, the magazine said, falsely marketed Helfgott as an "unsung genius".

On stage, Helfgott is known for his unusual platform manner. In 1997, critic Anthony Tommasini noted that Helfgott "stares into the hall and renders a nonstop commentary of grunts, groans and mutterings". Of a 1997 Helfgott recital in New Zealand, critic Denis Dutton wrote, "If, as Goethe claimed, architecture is frozen music, David Helfgott is the musician who finally proves the converse: that music can also be melted architecture – a structureless rubble of notes."

Helfgott played piano in the Silverchair song "Emotion Sickness".

Helfgott tours Australia annually and plays a small number of recitals in other countries.

His 2015 European tour was the subject of a documentary, Hello, I Am David!

== Personal life ==
Helfgott lives in The Promised Land, a valley near Bellingen in New South Wales. His second wife Gillian died in 2022, aged 90. In a 2016 interview, Gillian stated that Helfgott "has been misdiagnosed for decades", does not have schizophrenia, and had recently been diagnosed with autism.

== Discography ==
=== Albums ===
List of albums, with Australian chart positions
Title	Album details	Peak chart positions
Title	Album details	AUS
David Helfgott	Released: 1991; Format: CD; Label:	–
David Helfgott Plays Liszt	Released: 1994; Format: CD; Label: Rap Productions (RAPCD 190547–2)	–
Rachmaninov The Last Romantic	Released: 1996; Format: CD; Label: BMG Classics (74321 40378 2)	40
Shine soundtrack	Released: August 1996; Format: CD; Label: Philips (454 710 2)	14
Brilliantissimo	Released: April 1997; Format: CD; Label: BMG Classics (74321 46725 2)	40
Brave New World	Released: August 1998; Format: CD; Label: BMG Classics (74321 57813 2)	90
Pianissimo	Released: 2009; Format: CD, Digital; Label: Helfgott (2010-01)	–
With Love	Released: 2010; Format: CD, Digital; Label: Helfgott (2010-02)	–
Rach 3 (with Rhodri Clarke)	Released: September 2018; Format: CD, Digital; Label: 972235	–

== Awards and nominations ==
Helfgott was awarded an honorary doctorate of music by Edith Cowan University in 2004.

He was awarded the Medal of the Order of Australia in the 2021 Australia Day Honours.

=== ARIA Music Awards ===
The ARIA Music Awards is an annual awards ceremony that recognises excellence, innovation, and achievement across all genres of Australian music. They commenced in 1987.

Year	Nominee / work	Award	Result	Ref.
1991	David Helfgott	Best Classical Album	Nominated	

=== Mo Awards ===
The Australian Entertainment Mo Awards (commonly known informally as the Mo Awards), were annual Australian entertainment industry awards. They recognise achievements in live entertainment in Australia from 1975 to 2016.

Year	Nominee / work	Award	Result (wins only)
1996	David Helfgott	Australian Show Business Ambassador of the Year	Won
