= Tomorrow (Silverchair song) =

1995 single by Silverchair

- UK single cover

Single by Silverchair

from the album Frogstomp
- B-side: "Blind" (live)
- Released: 5 June 1995
- Studio: Festival (Pyrmont, Australia)
- Genre: Grunge; post-grunge; alternative rock
- Length: 4:25
- Label: Murmur; Columbia
- Songwriters: Daniel Johns; Ben Gillies
- Producer: Kevin "Caveman" Shirley

Silverchair singles chronology
"Tomorrow" (1995)	"Pure Massacre" (1995)

Music video
- "Tomorrow (Australian version)" on YouTube "Tomorrow (US version)" on YouTube

"Tomorrow" is a song by Australian rock band Silverchair. Written by singer and lead guitarist Daniel Johns and drummer Ben Gillies, it was originally released on their debut EP, also titled Tomorrow (1994). The song was re-recorded and included on Frogstomp, the band's debut studio album, released six months later on 27 March 1995. It was released as the first single from the album.

"Tomorrow" became a breakthrough hit for Silverchair when it reached number one on the Australian ARIA Singles Chart and remained there for six weeks. A re-recorded version was issued in 1995 and topped the New Zealand Singles Chart as well as the US Billboard Modern Rock Tracks and Album Rock Tracks charts. In the United Kingdom, the song reached No. 59 on the UK Singles Chart in September 1995. At the ARIA Music Awards of 1995, the song "Tomorrow" won three awards in the categories 'Single of the Year', 'Highest Selling Single', and 'Breakthrough Artist – Single'; they won two further awards for Frogstomp.

In January 2018, as part of Triple M's "Ozzest 100", the 'most Australian' songs of all time, "Tomorrow" was ranked at No. 36. In November 2020, "Tomorrow" was inducted into the National Film and Sound Archive's Sounds of Australia registry. In 2025, the song placed 17 in the Triple J Hottest 100 of Australian Songs.

== History ==
Ben Gillies (on drums and percussion) and Daniel Johns (on vocals and lead guitar) co-wrote "Tomorrow" when they were performing with Chris Joannou (on bass guitar) as Innocent Criminals, which formed in 1992. Tobin Finnane was Innocent Criminals' second guitarist, though he would later leave the band. Innocent Criminals entered YouthRock, a competition for school-based bands, in 1994. Early in that year, they recorded demos of "Acid Rain", "Cicada", "Pure Massacre", and "Tomorrow" at Platinum Sound Studios. Johns recalled making the demos "[w]e had just recorded that at a really cheap studio ... It cost about $75. We weren't in there for more than an hour. The version we entered went for about six minutes".

In April 1994, the band won a national band competition called Pick Me, using their demo of "Tomorrow". The competition was conducted by the SBS TV show Nomad and Australian Broadcasting Corporation (ABC) alternative radio station Triple J.

As part of the prize, Triple J recorded the song and ABC filmed a music video, which was aired on 16 June. For the video's broadcast, they had changed their name to Silverchair (styled as silverchair until 2002). On 16 September, the Triple J recording of "Tomorrow" was released on a four-track extended play of the same name, which also included the songs "Acid Rain", "Blind", and "Stoned". From late October, it spent six weeks at number-one on the ARIA Singles Chart. It also reached number one on the New Zealand RIANZ Singles Chart in February 1995.

In 1995, a re-recorded version of "Tomorrow" (and a new music video) was made for the United States market, becoming the most-played song on US modern rock radio that year. Serviced to US alternative radio on 5 June 1995, it peaked at number one on both the Billboard Modern Rock Tracks and the Album Rock Tracks charts; it made No. 28 on the Billboard Hot 100 Airplay chart. In the United Kingdom, the song was released as Silverchair's second single on 28 August 1995, one month after "Pure Massacre". It reached No. 59 on the UK Singles Chart the following month.

== Inspiration ==
In January 1996, when asked about where the inspiration for "Tomorrow" came from, Johns said:

That was on a TV show. There was this poor guy taking a rich guy through a hotel to experience the losses of the less fortunate than him. The rich guy is just complaining because he just wants to get out and the poor guy is saying you have to wait till tomorrow to get out. That's one of our least serious songs but it still has meaning to it.

In June 2024, Gillies said about when first playing the song, "It felt like an electric spark" and "We were all doing our own thing, but we were in sync."

== Music videos ==
Two different music videos were released to promote "Tomorrow". The original version was directed by Robert Hambling for the SBS-TV show Nomad, which was produced by former Triple J broadcaster Tracee Hutchison. It was broadcast on 16 June 1994 as part of the group's prize for winning the Pick Me competition. This version of the video was filmed at the 1861 Old Newcastle Police Station & Goal.

The second version was shown in the US in 1995 and directed by Mark Pellington. This video has been described as mirroring the music video for the 1991 Pearl Jam song "Jeremy", also directed by Pellington, as well as the work of directors Samuel Bayer and Matt Mahurin. Like many grunge videos popular on MTV at the time, the US "Tomorrow" video includes harsh lighting, especially on the face; various disturbing images, such as a pig eating money and shots of a spider-like creature; jump cuts between random images; and scribbled handwritten notes. The video's high rotation on MTV "led to an abundance of radio requests". This version of the video was included on the Frogstomp: 20th Anniversary Deluxe Edition bonus DVD in March 2015.

== Reception ==
=== ARIA Music Awards ===
On 20 October 1995, at the ARIA Music Awards, "Tomorrow" won three categories: 'Single of the Year', 'Highest Selling Single', and 'Breakthrough Artist – Single'; the group won two further awards for their work on the related album, Frogstomp. At the ceremony they performed a cover version of Radio Birdman's "New Race" with Tim Rogers (of You Am I) joining them on stage. Their trophies were collected by Josh Shirley, the young son of Frogstomp's producer, Kevin Shirley.

=== Critical response ===
AllMusic's Stephen Thomas Erlewine described the "angst-ridden single" as "from the standard grunge formula".

In February 2004, Australian rock musician Scott Owen of the Living End was asked for "the most influential Australian music release" and answered that it was Silverchair's "Tomorrow", he explained "it taught kids that if you give it a go you have the chance to take on the world".

In September 2021, Ultimate Guitar placed "Tomorrow" at No. 6 on their "Top 10 Grunge Songs That Prove Grunge Never Tried to Kill the Guitar Solo" list. They described it as "An outstanding exercise in quiet-loud dynamics, it features a wah-soaked guitar solo that showcases Johns' exquisite taste for melodic earworms."

In April 2022, The Guardian ranked "Tomorrow" at No. 1 on their "The 25 best Silverchair songs - sorted" list, saying "The EP version is slightly preferable to the one re-recorded for Frogstomp, mostly because it sounds a little rougher around the edges – clearly made by three teenagers who just wanna throw every idea they have into the pot and see how it tastes."

== Live performances ==
On 9 December 1995, Silverchair performed the songs "Tomorrow" and "Pure Massacre" on Saturday Night Live, hosted by David Alan Grier.

== Other appearances ==
The version of "Tomorrow" included on Frogstomp appeared on the ARIA Awards 20th Anniversary compilation in 2006.

== Parody ==
Australian band Silverpram released a parody version of "Tomorrow", titled "Frogstamp", in October 1995. The lyrics of the parody focused on the young age of the Silverchair band members at the time, with the chorus lyrics changed to "I turn four tomorrow." The single peaked at No. 72 on the Australian ARIA Singles Chart and was nominated for "Best Comedy Release" at the ARIA Music Awards of 1996.

== Tomorrow EP and other releases ==
Tomorrow

EP by Silverchair
- Released: 19 September 1994
- Studios: Triple J (Sydney, Australia)
- Length: 15:33
- Label: Murmur
- Producer: Phil McKellar

Silverchair chronology
Tomorrow (1994)	Frogstomp (1995)

The Tomorrow EP was released on 19 September 1994 by record label Murmur. 200,000 units of the EP were sold in three months. The song "Blind" was included on Triple J: Eleven – A Very Loud Compilation in 1994. The song was later included on the vinyl release of Frogstomp in 1995.

A version of "Stoned" with re-recorded vocals was included on the Mallrats soundtrack on October 17, 1995. A re-recorded version of "Blind" appeared on The Cable Guy soundtrack on May 21, 1996. The re-recorded version of "Blind" was included on Silverchair's compilation albums The Best Of: Volume 1 in November 2000 and Rarities 1994–1999 in December 2002. The Tomorrow EP and live recordings of "Tomorrow" and "Blind" were included on the bonus "Rarities" CD on the Frogstomp: 20th Anniversary remaster, released on 27 March 2015. Live video performances of "Blind" and "Tomorrow" from June 1995 are included on the Frogstomp: 20th Anniversary Deluxe Edition bonus DVD. On the 2015 remaster, a portion of the guitar solo is omitted on the track "Acid Rain".

The band said the following about the four songs included on the Tomorrow EP during an interview with The Buzz Magazine in September 1994:

Blind, that's the heavier one, that's a really good song, that really gets you going and it's a lot heavier than the other ones and we've probably started up more of those heavier ones than ballady ones. Acid Rain we like. Tomorrow was probably the first strong original that came out of the band. Stoned, well none of us really liked that but Sony thought it sounded great so we thought we'll just put it on there for a throwaway song or something.

All tracks are written by Daniel Johns and Ben Gillies.

Tomorrow CD/MC EP (Original Australian version) (MATTCD001)/(MATTC001)
No.	Title	Length
1.	"Tomorrow"	4:25
2.	"Acid Rain"	3:26
3.	"Blind"	4:52
4.	"Stoned"	2:50
Total length:		15:33

Tomorrow 7" EP (MATTV001) Limited edition, 2,000 copies
No.	Title	Length
1.	"Tomorrow"	4:25
2.	"Acid Rain"	3:26
3.	"Blind"	4:52
4.	"Stoned"	2:50
Total length:		15:33

=== Release history ===
Release dates and formats for Tomorrow (EP)
Region	Date	Format(s)	Label(s)	Ref.
Australia	19 September 1994	CD; cassette	Murmur	
Australia	16 January 1995	12-inch vinyl	Murmur	

== Track listings ==
All tracks are written by Daniel Johns and Ben Gillies.

"Tomorrow" European CD single, black cover (6614942)
No.	Title	Length
1.	"Tomorrow"	4:27
2.	"Faultline (Live)" (Recorded live at 'The Furnace' Newcastle and mixed at Triple J Studios Sydney)	2:58
3.	"Stoned (Live)" (Recorded live at 'The Furnace' Newcastle and mixed at Triple J Studios Sydney)	2:48
Total length:		10:13

"Tomorrow" European limited 7" single, black cover (6623957)
No.	Title	Length
1.	"Tomorrow"	4:25
2.	"Blind (Live)" (Recorded live at The Big Day Out in Melbourne on the 3RPR Mobile, mixed by Phil McKellar and Toby Learmont)	5:14
Total length:		9:39

"Tomorrow" UK CD single, black cover (6623952)
No.	Title	Length
1.	"Tomorrow"	4:28
2.	"Leave Me Out (Live)" (Recorded live at The Big Day Out in Melbourne on the 3RPR Mobile, mixed by Phil McKellar and Toby Learmont)	3:08
3.	"Undecided (Live)" (Recorded live at The Big Day Out in Melbourne on the 3RPR Mobile, mixed by Phil McKellar and Toby Learmont)	4:24
4.	"Tomorrow (Demo Version)" (Australian single version)	4:25
Total length:		16:22

"Tomorrow" US single (ESK7137)
No.	Title	Length
1.	"Tomorrow (Album Version)"	4:27
2.	"Tomorrow (Demo Version)" (Australian single version)	4:25
Total length:		8:52

"Tomorrow" Canadian single (cdnk1066)
No.	Title	Length
1.	"Tomorrow"	4:27
Total length:		4:27

== Personnel ==
Silverchair

- Ben Gillies – drums
- Chris Joannou – bass guitar
- Daniel Johns – vocals, lead guitar

Production and artwork

- Producer, engineer – Phil McKellar
  - Producer, recording, mixing (Album Version) – Kevin Shirley
  - Mastering (Album Version) – Ted Jensen
- Photography – David Anderson
- Studios – Triple J studios (Sydney, Australia)

== Awards and nominations ==
ARIA Music Awards

Year	Award	Work	Result
1995	Single of the Year	"Tomorrow"	Won
1995	Highest Selling Single	"Tomorrow"	Won
1995	Breakthrough Artist - Single	"Tomorrow"	Won
1995	Song of the Year	"Tomorrow"	Nominated

== Charts ==
=== Weekly charts ===
Chart (1994–1995)	Peak position
Australia (ARIA)	1
Canada Top Singles (RPM)	42
Canada Rock/Alternative (RPM)	1
Europe (Eurochart Hot 100)	93
New Zealand (Recorded Music NZ)	1
Scottish Singles Sales (Official Charts)	65
UK Singles (Official Charts)	59
US Hot 100 Airplay (Billboard)	28
US Album Rock Tracks (Billboard)	1
US Modern Rock Tracks (Billboard)	1
US CHR/Pop Top 50 (Radio & Records)	40

=== Year-end charts ===
Chart (1994)	Position
Australia (ARIA)	9

Chart (1995)	Position
Australia (ARIA)	19
Canada Rock/Alternative (RPM)	2
New Zealand (RIANZ)	13
US Album Rock Tracks (Billboard)	9
US Modern Rock Tracks (Billboard)	1

== Certifications ==
Region	Certification	Certified units/sales
Australia (ARIA)	4× Platinum	280,000^{‡}
New Zealand (RMNZ)	Platinum	30,000^{‡}
^{‡} Sales+streaming figures based on certification alone.

== Release history ==
Release dates and formats for "Tomorrow"
Region	Date	Format(s)	Label(s)	Ref.
United States	5 June 1995	Alternative radio; metal radio	Epic	
United States	8 August 1995	Contemporary hit radio	Epic	
United Kingdom	28 August 1995	7-inch vinyl; CD; cassette	Columbia; Murmur	
