= MXXWLL =

Australian hip-hop/funk producer

Maxwell Bidstrup (born 29 June 1990), known professionally as MXXWLL, is a hip-hop/funk music composer, producer and performer from Sydney, Australia. He rose to prominence following an online music video of his music production which garnered the attention of Snoop Dogg and DJ Jazzy Jeff. As a solo artist, MXXWLL has released one beat tape album along with several singles and remixes. MXXWLL released his debut beat tape Beats Vol. 1, in 2017. Prior to the release of the beat tape, he released his 2016 remix of Snakehips' single "Cruel" featuring One Direction's Zayn Malik, followed by a remix for Zedd and Elley Duhé's track "Happy Now" in 2018.

In 2019, MXXWLL produced the single "Purple Emoji" for Ty Dolla Sign featuring J. Cole, which premiered as Zane Lowe's world record at Beats 1 on 20 May, and was later performed live on The Tonight Show Starring Jimmy Fallon on 29 July. "Purple Emoji" reached number 11 on the Billboard Bubbling Under Hot 100 chart for 8 June 2019.

On 22 May 2020 MXXWLL released his second studio album Sheeesh featuring Aloe Blacc, Sir and Guapdad 4000.
