= Antony Partos =

Australian film and TV composer

Antony Michael Partos is an Australian film and TV composer. He specialises in creating scores that blend both acoustic and electronic elements with a mix of world musical instruments. His feature film credits include Animal Kingdom (AFI Award for Best Feature Score) The Rover, Disgrace, The Home Song Stories (AFI Award for best feature score), Unfinished Sky (AFI Award for best feature score) and The Speedway Murders.

His scores for TV dramas include The Slap (AGSC Award for Best TV Theme), Mabo (AGSC Award for Best Telemovie Score), Rake (AGSC Award for Best Music in a TV Series and Best Song for a TV Drama), Redfern Now (AACTA Award for Best Music Score in Television and Best Song for a TV Drama).

Other projects include the United States feature film, 99 Homes, the award-winning score for the feature film Tanna (AACTA and Film Critics Circle Award), the feature documentary Sherpa (winner of the AGSC as well as AACTA award for best music for a documentary) alongside the drama series Love Child, Janet King and Jack Irish.

== Early life ==
Antony Partos studied piano, horn, and composition at the Conservatorium High School in Sydney from 1980 to 1986. In 1987 he was accepted into the Australian Film, Television and Radio School. He completed a Bachelor of Arts in Film and Television, majoring in sound in 1991. In 1994 he formed the music production house Supersonic, with composers Andrew Lancaster and Paul Healy, at Minton House in Sydney's Kings Cross. In 2010 Supersonic closed, and he and Lancaster formed the music production house Sonar Music at Disney Studios Australia in Moore Park in Sydney.

== Personal life ==
Antony Michael Partos' parents are Andrew Partos (1930–2022) and Robin Partos (1938–2006), and his sister was Vanessa Partos (1970–1989). Partos' partner is Rebecca Gregg; they have two children.

== Awards and nominations ==
=== New Zealand film and television awards ===
Win
1993 Crush – New Zealand Film and TV Award for Best Film Score – composer

=== AFI / AACTA Awards ===
Wins

AFI Award for Best Original Music Score – Antony Partos
2007 The Home Song Stories – composer
2008 Unfinished Sky – composer
2010 Animal Kingdom – co-composer with Sam Petty
2016 Tanna – composer

AACTA Award for Best Original Music Score in Television – Antony Partos
2013 Redfern Now – "Episode 3: Babes in Arms" – composer

AACTA Award for Best Sound in a Documentary – Anthony Partos
2015 Sherpa – composer

Nominations

AFI / AACTA Award for Best Original Music Score – Antony Partos
2002 Walking on Water – composer
2012 33 Postcards – composer
2014 The Rover – co-composer with Sam Petty

AACTA Award for Best Sound in a Documentary – Anthony Partos
2013 Fallout – co-composer with Livia Ruzic and Keith Thomas

=== ARIA Music Awards ===
The ARIA Music Awards is an annual awards ceremony that recognises excellence, innovation, and achievement across all genres of the music of Australia.

Year	Nominee / work	Award	Result	Reference
2020	Mystery Road (with Matteo Zingales)	Best Original Soundtrack, Cast or Show Album	Nominated	
2021	Rams	Best Original Soundtrack, Cast or Show Album	Nominated	
