= What So Not =

Australian music project

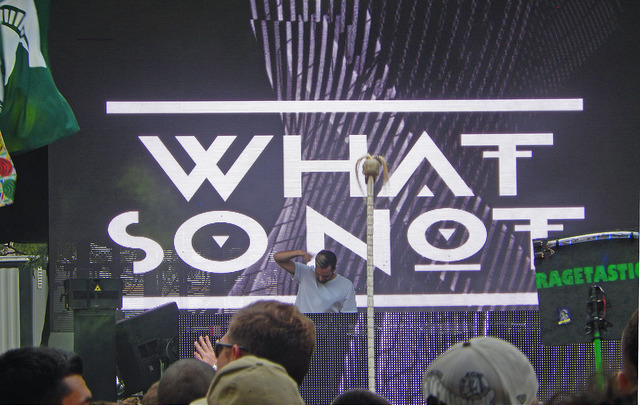
- What So Not performing at the North Coast Music Festival, Chicago in August 2014

Background information
- Origin: Sydney, New South Wales, Australia
- Genres: Electronica; experimental; hip hop; trap; bass; house; wonky
- Occupations: DJ; record producer
- Years active: 2010–present
- Labels: Sweat It Out; Counter Records; Owsla
- Members: Christopher Emerson
- Past members: Harley Streten
- Website: whatsonot.com

What So Not is an electronic music project by Australian DJ and record producer Emoh Instead (stage name of Christopher John Emerson). What So Not has toured the world, playing at various festivals, including Coachella, Bonnaroo, Ultra Music Festival, and Lollapalooza.

He is best known for songs such as "Jaguar", "High You Are", "Gemini" (featuring George Maple), "Tell Me" (with RL Grime), and his remix of Rüfüs Du Sol's "Innerbloom". He has featured on charts such as the Australian Singles chart, Triple J Hottest 100, and the USA iTunes Dance Album chart. He released his debut studio album Not All the Beautiful Things on 9 March 2018.

== History ==
=== 2010–2017: Career beginnings ===
What So Not started as a project between record producer Emoh Instead and Flume. On 13 November 2011, the duo released their debut EP, 7 Dollar Bill. During this time, they had released several remixes of artists such as Peking Duk, Tom Piper, and Major Lazer. In early 2013, they embarked on the Massive Universe Tour, in several venues across Australia. On 28 May 2013, they released their second EP, The Quack, featuring a collaboration with Action Bronson on label Owsla.

The duo released the song, "Jaguar" on 6 December 2013.

On 24 June 2014, What So Not and RL Grime released their single, "Tell Me", with Chris Martins from Spin describing the track as "of both melodic might and percussive ferocity".

In February 2015, Flume announced his departure from What So Not, citing that he and Emoh Instead had been moving in different creative directions, and stated that the upcoming Gemini EP would be What So Not's last release as a duo. "Gemini" featuring George Maple, the first track from the EP, debuted on 9 May 2015. The track was named on Triple J Hottest 100 later that year and peaked at number 52 on the Australian Singles chart.

Gemini was released as a free download on 18 December 2015, which featured collaborations with artists Dillon Francis, Tunji Ige and KLP. The EP was downloaded over 800,000 times.

In November 2015, What So Not, Baauer and George Maple co-produced a track for Australian rapper Tkay Maidza, titled "Ghost". The song was premiered on Triple J. On 9 September 2016, What So Not released his first EP as a solo artist, Divide & Conquer, which included previously released track "Lone".

In October 2016, What So Not, George Maple and Djemba Djemba co-produced "Afterglow", a track from Australian rapper Tkay Maidza's debut album Tkay.

On 3 November 2016, RL Grime released the single "Waiting" in collaboration with What So Not and Skrillex which was in production since 2013. The track's release was teased through a promotional video which parodied chat-line advertisements and featured footage of 1980-era-influenced vixens with a phone number flashing across the screen, where by calling the number listeners can hear the song in full.

A collaboration between What So Not and New York artist LPX, "Better", was released on 8 September 2017; and was debuted on Australian Radio Station Triple J on 7 September 2017. "I had a few productions I'd been working on in this sonic field but struggled to find a vocalist with the right attitude and tone to fit. Lizzy and I clicked instantly on this trajectory & began jamming on the tune," stated What So Not about the track's production. He released "Be Ok Again" which featured Australian musician Daniel Johns on 28 November 2017. The track was produced after Johns noticed What So Not working with Slumberjack as he walked by the studio, which prompted him to invite What So Not to work together at his Newcastle studio.

=== 2018–2020: Not All the Beautiful Things ===
On 31 January 2018, What So Not announced the arrival of his debut album titled Not All the Beautiful Things which was released on 9 March 2018. The album featured collaborations with several artists, including Skrillex, Slumberjack, San Holo, and American rock band Toto. Together with the announcement, he released lead album single "Stuck In Orbit" which was co-produced with Jono Ma from Australian psychedelic dance band Jagwar Ma. What So Not released a third album single titled "Beautiful", a collaboration with Swedish singer/songwriter Winona Oak, on 27 February 2018 and announced a national Australia tour for his "Beautiful Things' World Tour" where he visited cities Perth, Adelaide, Melbourne, Sydney and Brisbane in June 2018.

What So Not's first single of 2019, "We Can Be Friends" featuring American singer Herizen, was released on 22 January 2019. He previously met the singer at a songwriting workshop in Nicaragua, while citing American record producer and rapper J Dilla as the track's main inspiration.

On 6 February 2020, What So Not announced he was "taking a break", stating "I want to pull myself out of the 'routine' of it all and make sure everything I do is 110%."

=== 2021–present: Anomaly and Motions ===
On 8 January 2021, What So Not returned from hiatus with a remix for Run The Jewels featuring Pharrell Williams and Zack de la Rocha stating "I was honoured to get the nod to put this record out, not only with RTJ, but also my childhood heroes Zack and Pharrell."

In April 2021, What So Not announced a new era for the project, followed by the release of "The Change" featuring DMA's. NME described the track as channelling the Manchester influences of DMA's 2020 record The Glow, while shifting the balance toward dance over rock, drawing comparisons to an Underworld-style rave.

On 16 August 2024, Motions was released, collaborating with artists including Lucy Lucy, MNDR, IMANU, Habstrakt, and Maiah Manser across the four-track EP.

On 29 May 2026, What So Not released "Everest", delivering a cinematic single alongside Alina Pash.

== Discography ==
- Not All the Beautiful Things (2018)
- Anomaly (2022)

== Awards and nominations ==
=== AIR Awards ===
The Australian Independent Record Awards (commonly known informally as AIR Awards) is an annual awards night to recognise, promote and celebrate the success of Australia's Independent Music sector.

Year	Nominee / work	Award	Result
2019	"Beautiful" (featuring Winona Oak)	Best Independent Dance, Electronica Or Club Single	Won

=== Environmental Music Prize ===
The Environmental Music Prize is a quest to find a theme song to inspire action on climate and conservation. It commenced in 2022.

Year	Nominee / work	Award	Result	Ref.
2022	"Messin' Me Up" (featuring Evan Giia)	Environmental Music Prize	Nominated	

=== J Awards ===
The J Awards are an annual Australian music awards ceremony established in 2005 by Triple J, the youth-focused radio station of the Australian Broadcasting Corporation (ABC).

Year	Nominee / work	Award	Result	Ref.
2024	What So Not	Live Act of the Year	Nominated	

=== Queensland Music Awards ===
The Queensland Music Awards (previously known as the Q Song Awards) is an annual music awards ceremony that recognises both emerging and established artists from Queensland, Australia. The awards were established in 2006, initially focusing exclusively on songwriting before expanding to include genre, experience and industry categories.

Year	Nominee / work	Award	Result (wins only)	Ref.
2022	"Every Single Time" - Example (featuring What So Not & Lucy Lucy)	Video of the Year	Won	
