= Off Bloom =

Off Bloom is a Danish-British trio of producers; Alex Flockhart, Mads Christensen, and Mette Mortensen (also on vocals). They formed in Copenhagen in 2015 and began producing music between apartments in Bethnal Green in London and a studio in Copenhagen . They have collaborated with other artists such as Liss, Kill J, and Vera, as well as photographer Lasse Dearman and visual designer Magnus Pind Bjerre. Their music has been described as "deconstructed pop at its best."

== Love To Hate It EP ==
Off Bloom's debut EP, Love To Hate It was released on 21 October 2016 through Sport Records. Encompassing five tracks, the EP highlights the band's British ties with production/mix credits from Two Inch Punch, Jamie Snell (Mura Masa & Nao) and George Reid (of AlunaGeorge). Monster

The video for the band's first single "Love To Hate It" premiered pm 20 October 2016 on the FADER. Directed by Nadia Marquard Otzen - who has worked with Years & Years and The 1975 - it was filmed in rural Denmark with a group of the bands' friends over the course of several days. Their single "Falcon Eye" was featured on the soundtrack of FIFA 18.

== Discography ==
=== Extended plays ===
- Love To Hate It (21 October 2016)
- Lover Like Me (22 September 2017)

=== Singles ===
- Falcon Eye (17 February 2017)
- Lover Like Me (22 September 2017)
