= Young Modern =

Studio album by Silverchair
- Released: 31 March 2007 (Australia)
- Recorded: April–November 2006
- Studio: Seedy Underbelly Studios, Los Angeles; Metalworks Studios, Mississauga, Canada
- Genre: Alternative rock; baroque pop; art rock; glam rock
- Length: 45:15
- Label: Eleven; EastWest
- Producer: Daniel Johns; Nick Launay

Silverchair chronology
Live from Faraway Stables (2003)	Young Modern (2007)

Singles from Young Modern
- 1. "Straight Lines" Released: 10 March 2007; 2. "Reflections of a Sound" Released: 14 July 2007; 3. "If You Keep Losing Sleep" Released: 9 October 2007; 4. "Mind Reader" Released: 23 February 2008

"Straight Lines"
A 25-second sample from "Straight Lines"

Young Modern is the fifth and final studio album by Australian rock band Silverchair, released in Australia on 31 March 2007 and in the United States on 24 July 2007 and co-produced by Daniel Johns and Nick Launay. The title comes from a nickname given to Daniel Johns by composer Van Dyke Parks. The tracks "Straight Lines", "Reflections of a Sound", "If You Keep Losing Sleep" and "Mind Reader" were released as singles. Young Modern entered the Australian albums chart at No. 1 on 15 April 2007, their fifth consecutive album to do this, making Silverchair the first band to accomplish this feat in Australia. The album was certified Triple Platinum by the ARIA, peaked at No. 70 on the US Billboard 200 chart and opened at No. 8 on the New Zealand albums chart. Young Modern won six ARIA Awards in 2007, including Best Group, Best Rock Album, Single of the Year (for "Straight Lines") and Album of the Year. At the J Awards of 2007, the album was nominated for Australian Album of the Year.

== Recording and production ==
Silverchair spent five weeks in the Australian Hunter Region in late 2005 to practise and sharpen material that Daniel Johns had previously written. Following this, the band recorded intermediate full band demo versions of the songs. To record the final versions of these songs, the band travelled to Los Angeles to record with record producer Nick Launay at Seedy Underbelly Studios. Johns co-produced the album alongside Launay. During the L.A. sessions, additional songs were written and recorded. Van Dyke Parks was hired to compose orchestral arrangements for three songs: "If You Keep Losing Sleep", "All Across the World" and the three part epic "Those Thieving Birds/Strange Behaviour". Johns and Parks travelled to Prague to have the orchestral arrangements recorded by the City of Prague Philharmonic Orchestra.

Unlike previous Silverchair albums, Young Modern was funded independently by the band rather than by a record label. This was done to "remove the added label pressures", according to Billboard. The name Young Modern comes from a nickname given to Silverchair's lead singer, Johns, by Van Dyke Parks during their time working together on Diorama in 2002. The album features various guest appearances from Australian and international musicians such as Luke Steele, Julian Hamilton and Paul Mac, the latter of whom performed with Johns as the Dissociatives.

== Album and single releases ==
Young Modern was released on 31 March 2007 in Australia, and 24 July 2007 in the United States of America. The album was released in several versions—the original contained 11 songs, while the iTunes version contained an extra song, "English Garden" which featured Judith Durham. A limited edition DVD was also released, which contained a documentary entitled "The making of Young Modern", as well as the "Straight Lines" music video. The album's artwork (as well as the music video for "Reflections of a Sound") is a three-dimensional homage to Mondrian art; specifically, it is a direct reference to Composition with Red Blue and Yellow and its variants.

The first single from Young Modern, "Straight Lines", was released on 10 March 2007, a week before the album's release. "Straight Lines" entered the ARIA Charts at No. 1 on 25 March 2007, and held that rank for four weeks. It also peaked at No. 11 on the RMNZ charts. "Straight Lines" was certified double platinum by the Australian Recording Industry Association. On 28 October 2007, "Straight Lines" won Best Selling Australian Single at the ARIA Music Awards of 2007, as well as Single of the Year.

The second single, "Reflections of a Sound", was released on 14 July 2007 as a digital single. The music video for "Reflections of a Sound" was first screened on 8 June 2007, and was produced by Damon Escott and Stephen Lance of Head Pictures.

The third single from Young Modern was "If You Keep Losing Sleep", released on 9 October 2007. The song spent one week on the ARIA charts at No. 16, before dropping out of the charts. The music video for "If You Keep Losing Sleep" was orchestrated by Van Dyke Parks, and was produced by Damon Escott and Stephen Lance, who also created the "Reflections of a Sound" video. The video was described by Molly Meldrum as "the best video I've seen from Australia ever". Young Modern's fourth single, "Mind Reader", was released as an internet-only single on 23 February 2008. It had first appeared on radio in January that year.

== Reception ==
Professional ratings
Review scores
Source	Rating
AllMusic	4.5/5 stars
Entertainment Weekly	A−
The Phoenix	3.5/4 stars
PopMatters	3/10 stars
Rolling Stone	4/5 stars

Young Modern was received with high acclaim from reviewers. AllMusic's review said the album contained "catchy melodic hooks, inspired lyrical themes, and stunning string arrangements", and called it the "pinnacle of the band's fascinating development". Reviewer Clayton Bolger heaped praise on most of the songs on the album, calling "Straight Lines" an "instant rock classic".

Rolling Stone reviewer David Fricke called Silverchair's members "young (in their late twenties)...[and] aggressively modern", and Entertainment Weekly called the album a "polished glam-rock suite". Sputnikmusic reviewer Tyler Fisher also approved of the album, although he did not think it was as good as it was made out to be, commenting "It is not as good as the ARIA awards will undoubtedly make it out to be but still one of the better mainstream listens of the year."

During his weekly entertainment segment on the popular Australian breakfast show Sunrise, Australian music personality Molly Meldrum made a sincere comparison of the album to the classic Beatles album Sgt. Pepper's Lonely Hearts Club Band.

Nick Pearson of PopMatters, meanwhile, was critical of the album. He began his review with the statement "Once you reach the level of intellectual maturity where you can tell the difference between cryptic but poetic lyrics and nonsensical crap, you have outgrown Silverchair", and continued in the same fashion throughout. Pearson unfavourably likened Johns to Kurt Cobain, saying Johns shared a common inability: "[an] inability to write lyrics". His only praise was for the third single released from the album, "If You Keep Losing Sleep", stating "'If You Keep Losing Sleep' is proof that Silverchair are capable of recording interesting music".

The song "Straight Lines" was featured as downloadable content for the video game Rock Band in 2010.

== Track listing ==
All songs written by Daniel Johns unless otherwise noted.

1. "Young Modern Station" (Johns, Julian Hamilton) – 3:11
2. "Straight Lines" (Johns, Hamilton) – 4:18
3. "If You Keep Losing Sleep" – 3:20
4. "Reflections of a Sound" – 4:09
5. "Those Thieving Birds (Part 1) / Strange Behaviour / Those Thieving Birds (Part 2)" – 7:26
6. "The Man That Knew Too Much" – 4:20
7. "Waiting All Day" (Johns, Hamilton) – 4:29
8. "Mind Reader" (Johns, Hamilton) – 3:07
9. "Low" – 3:48
10. "Insomnia" – 3:06
11. "All Across the World" – 4:01

iTunes Store bonus tracks

12. "English Garden" – 4:23 (featuring Judith Durham)
13. "Straight Lines" (The Presets Remix) – 3:53 (iTunes special edition)

Bonus DVD

1. The making of Young Modern documentary.
2. "Straight Lines" music video
- A vinyl version of the album has been made limited to 1000 copies worldwide (400 Available in Australia and 600 elsewhere)

== Personnel ==
Silverchair

- Ben Gillies – drums
- Chris Joannou – bass
- Daniel Johns – guitar, vocals

Production

- Nick Launay, Daniel Johns – producing
- David Bottrill – mixing
- Bob Ludwig – mastering

Additional musicians

- Matt Appleton – brass
- Alain Johannes – slide guitar
- Czech Philharmonic Orchestra
- Michel Rose – pedal steel guitar
- Paul Mac – keyboards, programming
- Luke Steele – guitar, backing vocals
- Nayo Wallace – backing vocals
- Judith Durham – guest vocalist on English Garden

== Charts ==
=== Weekly charts ===
Chart (2007)	Peak position
Australian Albums (ARIA)	1
New Zealand Albums (RMNZ)	8
US Billboard 200	70
Canadian Album Charts (Nielsen BDS)	25

=== Year-end charts ===
Chart (2007)	Position
Australian Albums (ARIA)	9

== Certifications ==
Region	Certification	Certified units/sales
Australia (ARIA)	3× Platinum	210,000^{^}
^{^} Shipments figures based on certification alone.

== Awards and nominations ==
Year	Award	Category	Nominee	Result
2007	ARIA Music Awards	Album of the Year	Young Modern	Won
2007	ARIA Music Awards	Single of the Year	"Straight Lines"	Won
2007	ARIA Music Awards	Highest Selling Single	"Straight Lines"	Won
2007	ARIA Music Awards	Best Group	Silverchair	Won
2007	ARIA Music Awards	Best Rock Album	Young Modern	Won
2007	ARIA Music Awards	Best Video	"Straight Lines"	Won
2007	ARIA Music Awards	Highest Selling Album	Young Modern	Nominated
2007	ARIA Music Awards	Best Cover Art	Young Modern	Nominated
2007	J Awards	Australian Album of the Year	Young Modern	Nominated
2007	MTV Australia Video Music Awards	Video Vanguard	—	Won
2007	MTV Australia Video Music Awards	Best Group	"Straight Lines"	Nominated
2007	MTV Australia Video Music Awards	Video of the Year	"Straight Lines"	Nominated
2008	APRA Music Awards	Song of the Year	"Straight Lines"	Won
2008	APRA Music Awards	Most Played Australian Work	"Straight Lines"	Won
2008	APRA Music Awards	Songwriter of the Year	Daniel Johns	Won
