= Frogstomp =

Studio album by Silverchair
- Released: 27 March 1995
- Studios: Festival (Pyrmont, Australia)
- Genres: Grunge; alternative metal; post-grunge
- Length: 44:47
- Label: Murmur
- Producer: Kevin "Caveman" Shirley

Silverchair chronology
Tomorrow (1994)	Frogstomp (1995)	Freak Show (1997)

Singles from Frogstomp
- 1. "Tomorrow" Released: 1995; 2. "Pure Massacre" Released: 1995; 3. "Israel's Son" Released: 1995; 4. "Shade" Released: 29 May 1995

Frogstomp is the debut studio album by Australian rock band Silverchair. It was released on 27 March 1995, when the band members were only 15 years of age, by record label Murmur. The album features the band's most commercially successful single, "Tomorrow", which was first released on the band's debut EP of the same name six months earlier on 16 September 1994. Music videos were made for the album's four singles: "Tomorrow", "Pure Massacre", "Israel's Son", and "Shade".

== Recording ==
According to drummer Ben Gillies and vocalist and guitarist Daniel Johns in 1996, Frogstomp was recorded in nine days. Gillies stated the album took "even less days to mix." Prior to recording Frogstomp, Silverchair were previously named Innocent Criminals and consisted of drummer Ben Gillies and vocalist and guitarist Daniel Johns, with bassist Chris Joannou joining shortly after the band formed in 1992. Second guitarist Tobin Finnane was also in the band, though he later left. Demo versions of the songs "Acid Rain", "Cicada", "Pure Massacre", and "Tomorrow" were recorded by the band at Platinum Sound Studios in early 1993. In December 1995, Johns said about the recording of the demo songs, "It cost about $75. We weren't in there for more than an hour."

In July 2007, when asked about the grunge sound of Frogstomp and the band's musical influences, Gillies stated: "We were definitely influenced by the whole Seattle sound."

In May 2015, when asked if the record was made live in the studio, Johns said:

Yeah, that's the thing that I do really like about that album – it sounds exactly like we sounded. There was no big American producer calling the shots behind the desk and telling us to do this, this and this. It was literally this guy, Kevin Shirley, who was a great producer, just saying, "I want it to sound like you guys, but I want it to sound really f—ing loud and I want the guitars really f—ing loud." So to me, I was like, f—ing yeah! The songwriting might not be genius, but I think sonically, the performances are really good. It's really honest; it's just three Australian kids thrashing it out in the studio and that's exactly how it sounds.

In August 2020, Gillies said the following about the album:

We were always searching to keep that spark alive when Frogstomp came out because it was just so unrefined, it was just so raw. There was something magical about that we continued to try and capture. I think we did pretty well.

== Title ==
In January 1996, when asked why the album was named Frogstomp, Johns said:

I was at a guy from our record company's house one night and I was looking through his CDs because he's got a really good collection. I found this '60s pop collection record and I was just going (laughs), "Why do you have this?" I looked at the back and there was this song that some guy [Floyd Newman] did called Frogstomp and I said, "That's a pretty good name." (laughs) I just rang up Ben and Chris and we just thought it was really funny so we used it for the album.

== Release ==
Frogstomp was first released in Australia by record label Murmur on 27 March 1995. It reached number 1 on the Australian ARIA Albums Chart. The album was later released by Epic Records in the United States on 16 June 1995 and on 11 September 1995 in the United Kingdom.

Frogstomp is the only Silverchair album to receive platinum certification in the United States by the RIAA (Recording Industry Association of America) on 19 September 1995, making it the band's best-selling album in the U.S., and it was later certified double platinum on 14 February 1996.

The LP version of the album was sold on a green vinyl with "Blind", from the Tomorrow EP, as a bonus track and limited to 3,000 copies worldwide. A limited cassette edition of the album was also released.

On 27 March 2015, a remastered edition of Frogstomp was released as a two-CD/DVD set to mark the twentieth anniversary of its release. The standard edition of the 20th Anniversary remaster includes a second CD titled "Rarities" with Silverchair's Tomorrow EP, a vocal version of the song "Madman" (from the single "Shade"), and audio of a concert from June 1995 at the Cambridge Hotel in Newcastle, New South Wales. The Deluxe Edition of the 20th Anniversary remaster includes the "Rarities" CD as well as a DVD with video footage of the band's Cambridge Hotel concert, a video recording of "Israel's Son" at the 1995 Sydney Royal Easter Show, and the "Tomorrow", "Pure Massacre", and "Israel's Son" music videos.

== Reception ==
Professional ratings
Review scores
Source	Rating
AllMusic	4/5 stars
Bucket List	8.5/10
Classic Rock	3/5 stars
Entertainment Weekly	B−
Kill Your Stereo	3.5/5 stars
Mystic Sons	4.5/5 stars
Renowned for Sound	4/5 stars
Soundscape Magazine	4/5 stars
Soundsphere	4/5 stars
The Village Voice	C

Stephen Thomas Erlewine of AllMusic wrote:

For their age [15 years old], their instrumental capabilities are quite impressive, as the guitars and vocals growl with the force of rockers in their early twenties. At the same time, their songwriting abilities aren't as strong, and they are never able to break away from the standard grunge formula. Nevertheless, the record does deliver a collection of songs replicating the thunder of 'Tomorrow'.

Chuck Eddy of Entertainment Weekly wrote in July 1995:

the songs on Frogstomp almost all start out like dreary Metallica ballads and build toward gloomy, by-the-numbers grunge". David Fricke of Rolling Stone, on the other hand, wrote: "Truly shameless wanna-be's [sic] like Bush should be so lucky to have the hard smarts that Silverchair – particularly the band's main writers, singer-guitarist Daniel Johns and drummer Ben Gillies – show on such Frogstomp-ers as 'Pure Massacre' and 'Israel's Son'. When these guys turn 18, they'll really be dangerous.

In 1995, ABC Australia wrote that Silverchair provided:

a thrilling synthesis of rage, confusion and pain, and as a distillation of teen angst, you couldn't get a purer generational timestamp than Frogstomp.

== Legacy ==
In June 2015, Colm Browne of Soundscape Magazine said the lyrics on Frogstomp "show intelligence" and "a want to question the world, express feelings, get rid of negatives and be positive", saying the album "was and still is mightily impressive." British publication Classic Rock said about the 20th Anniversary remaster, "Frogstomp is as grunge as it gets. So was the world in '95, which bought 3.5 million copies of the album."

In October 2015, James Rose of the Daily Review wrote of the album

As an album in its own right, it's pretty good. As a debut by three 15-year-olds, it's about as good as it gets. There are still kids out there today listening to Frogstomp and shitting themselves. And so they should.

In November 2017, The Amity Affliction member Ahren Stringer said of the album: "I was obsessed with Frogstomp as a 12-year-old boy. I wanted to be Daniel Johns."

In September 2018, the album was ranked at No. 25 on Double J's list of "Top 50 Australian Albums of the '90s".

In July 2020, NME said about the album:

25 years later, Frogstomp is too vital to be dismissed as meat-and-potatoes hard rock. There’s a lot to love, and much of it is heavy: the furious double-time onslaughts of 'Israel’s Son' and 'Faultline', the pop-punk 'Findaway' and the thrashy instrumental 'Madman'.

In July 2020, Mixdown listed the album as among the seven best Australian grunge albums. In September 2020, the publication said the album had a "hard-edged sound with angsty (yet all too relatable) lyricism" and described Frogstomp as "one of the most definitive grunge records of its era."

In June 2021, American music magazine Spin wrote about the album in a retrospective piece, saying: "Frogstomp was ours, music written by kids our own age speaking to us in a language only we understood."

In December 2021, Frogstomp was listed at No. 6 in Rolling Stone Australia's "200 Greatest Albums of All Time" countdown.

In April 2022, British newspaper publication The Guardian included four Frogstomp songs on their list of "The 25 Best Silverchair Songs - Sorted" list. "Findaway", "Faultline", "Israel's Son", and "Tomorrow" ranked at No. 18, No. 14, No. 8, and No. 1, respectively.

In July 2024, Ultimate Guitar ranked Frogstomp at No. 7 on their "Top 10 Classic Grunge Albums That Didn't Come From Seattle" list, saying that Silverchair "managed to write such catchy, dark tunes that perfectly encapsulate the grunge spirit while still sounding fresh and memorable."

In June 2025, Lauryn Schaffner of Loudwire named the album the best post-grunge release of 1995. That same year, she said it was the band's best album. Also in June 2025, Jay Daniel Thompson wrote a book on the album as part of the famous 33^{1}/_{3} book series.

== Track listing ==
All tracks are written by Daniel Johns and Ben Gillies, except as noted.

Frogstomp
No.	Title	Length
1.	"Israel's Son" (Johns)	5:18
2.	"Tomorrow"	4:26
3.	"Faultline"	4:18
4.	"Pure Massacre"	4:58
5.	"Shade"	4:01
6.	"Leave Me Out"	3:03
7.	"Suicidal Dream" (Johns)	3:12
8.	"Madman" (Johns)	2:43
9.	"Undecided"	4:36
10.	"Cicada"	5:10
11.	"Findaway" (Johns)	2:58
Total length:		44:47

Vinyl (Bonus Track)
No.	Title	Length
12.	"Blind" (from Tomorrow EP)	4:50
Total length:		49:37

20th Anniversary Remastered Edition "Rarities" (Bonus CD) - 2015
No.	Title	Length
1.	"Tomorrow" (from Tomorrow EP)	4:26
2.	"Acid Rain" (from Tomorrow EP)	3:31
3.	"Blind (live)" (from Tomorrow EP)	4:55
4.	"Stoned" (from Tomorrow EP)	2:48
5.	"Madman" (vocal version)	2:44
6.	"Madman" (live at the Cambridge Hotel, 1995)	3:46
7.	"Blind" (live at the Cambridge Hotel, 1995)	5:32
8.	"Tomorrow" (live at the Cambridge Hotel, 1995)	4:44
9.	"Faultline" (live at the Cambridge Hotel, 1995)	4:16
10.	"Pure Massacre" (live at the Cambridge Hotel, 1995)	7:24
Total length:		44:10

20th Anniversary Remastered Deluxe Edition (Bonus CD+DVD) - 2015
No.	Title	Length
1.	"Madman" (live at the Cambridge Hotel, 1995)
2.	"Blind" (live at the Cambridge Hotel, 1995)
3.	"Tomorrow" (live at the Cambridge Hotel, 1995)
4.	"Faultline" (live at the Cambridge Hotel, 1995)
5.	"Fat Donuts/Pure Massacre" (live at the Cambridge Hotel, 1995)
6.	"Israel's Son" (live at the Sydney Royal Easter Show, 1995)
7.	"Tomorrow" (music video, US version)
8.	"Pure Massacre" (music video, Australian version)
9.	"Israel's Son" (music video, Australian version)

== Personnel ==
Silverchair

- Daniel Johns – guitar, vocals
- Chris Joannou – bass guitar
- Ben Gillies – drums

Production

- Kevin "Caveman" Shirley – producer, recording
- Toby Learmont, Jon Russell – engineering assistance
- Phil "Astroboy" Munro, Mark Thomas, Matt Witton – recording assistance
- Mixed by Kevin "Caveman" Shirley at Eclipse Studios (Sydney, Australia)
- Mastered by Ted Jensen at Sterling Sound (New York City) (original 1995 release)
- Remastered by Bob Ludwig at Gateway Mastering Studios (Portland, Maine) (2015 remaster)

Additional personnel

- Tony Stone Images/The Photo Library – original frog image artwork
- Greg Bennett – design, illustration
- John O'Donnell, Kevin Wilkins – art direction
- David Anderson, Adrienne Overall, Susan Robertson, John Watson – photography
- John O'Donnell, John Watson – A&R

== Charts ==
=== Weekly charts ===
Chart (1995)	Peak position
Australian Albums (ARIA)	1
Canada Top Albums/CDs (RPM)	10
European Albums (European Top 100 Albums)	82
German Albums (Offizielle Top 100)	81
New Zealand Albums (RMNZ)	2
Norwegian Albums (VG-lista)	30
UK Albums (Official Charts)	49
UK Rock & Metal Albums (Official Charts)	6
US Billboard 200	9

Chart (2022)	Peak position
German Albums (Offizielle Top 100)	73
UK Rock & Metal Albums (Official Charts)	35

=== Year-end charts ===
Chart (1995)	Position
Australian Albums (ARIA)	7
Canadian Albums (RPM)	12
New Zealand Albums (RMNZ)	22
US Billboard 200	77

Chart (1996)	Position
Australian Albums (ARIA)	36
US Billboard 200	83

== Certifications ==
Region	Certification	Certified units/sales
Australia (ARIA)	6× Platinum	420,000^{^}
Canada (Music Canada)	3× Platinum	300,000^{^}
New Zealand (RMNZ)	Platinum	15,000^{^}
United Kingdom (BPI)	Silver	60,000^{^}
United States (RIAA)	2× Platinum	2,000,000^{^}
^{^} Shipments figures based on certification alone.
