= Ben Gillies =

Australian musician (born 1979)

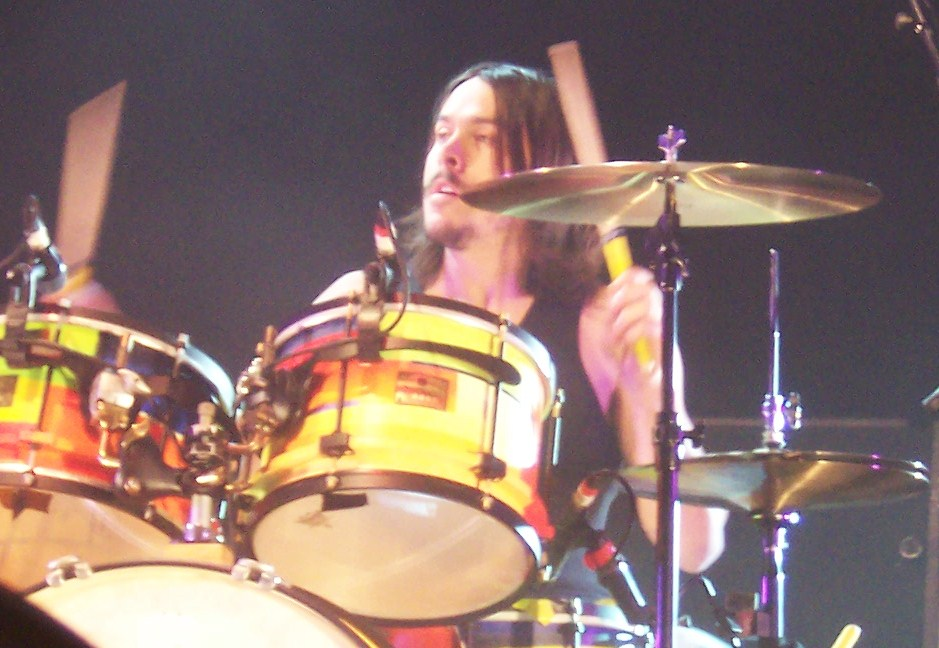
- Gillies performing in 2007 with Silverchair

Background information
- Also known as: Tomohawk
- Born: Benjamin David Gillies; 24 October 1979 (age 47); Newcastle, New South Wales, Australia
- Genres: Alternative rock, grunge, art rock
- Instruments: Drums, percussion, guitar, vocals
- Years active: 1992–present
- Labels: Murmur, Sony, Epic, Eleven
- Formerly of: Silverchair, Tambalane

Benjamin David Gillies (born 24 October 1979) is an Australian musician, best known as the drummer of Australian rock band Silverchair from 1992 until the band went on hiatus in 2011. In 2003, Gillies formed Tambalane with Wes Carr, initially as a songwriting project; they released a self-titled album in 2005 and toured Australia but subsequently folded. By June 2011, after Silverchair's disbandment, Gillies was in the final stages of about 12 months of working on his solo album, and he said that it was not a continuation of his earlier work with Tambalane. In 2012, he formed Bento, in which he performs lead vocals, and released the band's debut album Diamond Days.

== Career ==
Benjamin David Gillies was born on 24 October 1979 in Merewether, a suburb of Newcastle. He started as a quad drummer in the band The Marching Koalas, before forming a grunge group, Innocent Criminals, at the age of 12 with friends Daniel Johns, Chris Joannou, and Tobin Finnane. Playing originally at school and other venues in the Newcastle area, they came to attention after a weekend music workshop at the Tanilba Bay Progress Hall funded through the Arts Council of New South Wales in March 1994. By October 1994, under their new name Silverchair, their first EP Tomorrow had reached No. 1 on the ARIA Singles Chart. Silverchair went on to release five No. 1 albums, Frogstomp (1995), Freak Show (1997), Neon Ballroom (1999), Diorama (2002) and Young Modern (2007).

Gillies formed the band Tambalane in 2002 while Silverchair was in hiatus following Johns' illness, releasing a self-titled album featuring the singles "Little Miss Liar" and "Free" before the band folded in 2005. He then returned to work with Silverchair.

In May 2011, Silverchair announced an "indefinite hibernation" and that they were not likely to work together "in the foreseeable future". By June, Gillies was in the final stages of working on his solo album, he had been working on it for about 12 months and said that it was not a continuation of his earlier work with Tambalane.

In 2020, Gillies released the songs "Breathe In, Breathe Out" and "One Foot in Front of The Other".

In 2021, Gillies released the song "Yesteryear" which became a track on his five-song EP The Relative Relatives.

== Personal life ==
In June 2010, Gillies married Jakica 'Jackie' Ivancevic. His wife, known as Jackie Gillies, works as a professional psychic and featured on the TV series The Real Housewives of Melbourne.

In February 2018, Gillies was charged with mid-range drunk driving. During an interview with the ABC's Australian Story in September 2023, Ben revealed he had been dealing with anxiety ever since experiencing an acute psychotic break at the height of Silverchair's fame, when his first ecstasy pill, combined with a heavy marijuana habit, "pushed me over the edge".

He said he was able to beat his addictions, including heavy drinking, following an ultimatum from his wife Jackie.

In September 2020, Gillies was interviewed as a special guest on an episode of the Too Much of Not Enough Silverchair podcast, produced by Australian fan Daniel Hedger.

In October 2021, Gillies and his wife welcomed twin babies after multiple rounds of IVF.

In 2023, Gillies and his wife competed on the seventh season of The Amazing Race Australia.
