= Daniel Johns =

Australian rock musician

- Johns performing at the Big Day Out in 2008
- Born: Daniel Paul Johns; 22 April 1979 (age 47); Newcastle, New South Wales, Australia
- Education: Newcastle High School
- Occupations: Musician; singer; songwriter
- Years active: 1992–present
- Spouse: Natalie Imbruglia (m. 2003; div. 2008)
- Family: Heath Johns (brother), Chelsea Johns (sister)
- Musical career
- Genres: Alternative rock; electronica; art rock; R&B; grunge
- Instruments: Vocals; guitar; keyboards
- Labels: Atlantic; Eleven; BMG
- Formerly of: Silverchair; Dreams; The Dissociatives; I Can't Believe It's Not Rock
- Website: danieljohns.com

Daniel Paul Johns (born 22 April 1979) is an Australian musician, best known as the frontman, guitarist, and main songwriter of the rock band Silverchair. Johns is also a member of The Dissociatives with Paul Mac and a member of Dreams with Luke Steele. On 13 March 2015, Johns released his first solo EP Aerial Love and on 22 May 2015, he released his first solo LP Talk. Johns' second solo album FutureNever was released on 22 April 2022.

In 2007, Johns was ranked at number 18 on Rolling Stone's list of The 25 Most Underrated Guitarists. Johns has won 21 ARIA Awards from 49 nominations as a member of Silverchair, and has earned four other nominations as a solo artist.

== Early life and education ==
Daniel Paul Johns was born in Newcastle, New South Wales, on 22 April 1979 to Greg and Julie Johns. His father owned a fruit shop in Newcastle, and his mother was a full-time homemaker. He grew up in Merewether with two younger siblings.

Johns attended Newcastle High School, from which he graduated in 1997.

== Career ==
=== Silverchair (1992–2011) ===
At the age of 12, Johns and school friends Ben Gillies and Chris Joannou formed a band, originally named "The Innocent Criminals", and practiced daily after school for periods of four hours or more.

The band's career began when the three members were 15 years old when a demo recording of their song "Tomorrow" won a competition that was run by the SBS TV programme Nomad. The group, now named Silverchair, subsequently accepted a three-album deal from Sony Music in 1994, and the label hurriedly released their first album Frogstomp in 1995 after "Tomorrow" remained in the No. 1 position on the Australian singles chart for six weeks.

The band released Freak Show in 1997, followed by Neon Ballroom in 1999, and then Diorama in 2002. Following Diorama, Silverchair embarked on a lengthy hiatus before the release of the next album.

In late 2005, Johns and Silverchair reunited and announced the production of a new album entitled Young Modern, whose title comes from a nickname given to Johns by composer Van Dyke Parks. The new album was released on 31 March 2007 and was followed by the Across the Great Divide tour with fellow Australian band Powderfinger.

In May 2011, Silverchair announced on their website that the band was going into "indefinite hibernation" and explained that "it's become increasingly clear that the spark simply isn't there between the three of us at the moment". Later that month, Johns and filmmaker Josh Wakely presented a talk at TEDx Sydney in which they discussed a film that they were working on that was tentatively titled My Mind's Own Melody. A video of the talk was uploaded to YouTube in June 2011, and a trailer for the completed film was released in mid-2012.

=== I Can't Believe It's Not Rock and The Dissociatives (2000–2004) ===
During the post-Diorama hiatus, Johns worked on several side projects, the most notable being The Dissociatives with dance musician/producer Paul Mac. Johns and Mac worked together since Mac's 1997 remix of "Freak" and his contribution to Neon Ballroom. In 2000, they recorded a five-track EP I Can't Believe It's Not Rock. Their debut album The Dissociatives (2004) was initially recorded in London, United Kingdom, and a few months later, the two regrouped in Sydney and Newcastle to finish off the project. The Dissociatives toured with musicians Kim Moyes on drums, Julian Hamilton on keys, and James Haselwood on bass.

=== Collaborations ===
On 13 June 2008, it was reported on Silverchair's website that Johns was working on a new side project with Luke Steele (The Sleepy Jackson, Empire of the Sun), but a release date was not confirmed for the collaboration. In 2008, the name of the project was "Hathaway and Palmer," according to a radio interview that Steele conducted, but this has not been confirmed since.

In December 2008, Johns was named as the producer of The Scare's album.

In 2012, Johns collaborated with the Australian Chamber Orchestra to create the soundtrack Atlas for a Qantas Airlines commercial that began airing a week before the 2012 Olympics. Johns explained:

When Qantas first approached me, I agreed to the project as I was really into the idea of creating a piece of music that represented Australia. I wanted it to sound big, something special. It was a conscious effort to create a good piece of music and not just a jingle. I've also wanted to work with the Australian Chamber Orchestra for a long time now, so it was great to finally be able to do that.

In May 2012, Johns wrote and recorded music with pop duo The Veronicas for the latter's third album. The writing process began in November 2011, and the twin sisters stated that working with Johns "was one of our greatest experiences."

As of January 2013, Johns was scheduled to appear in a live performance with Van Dyke Parks as part of the Adelaide Festival on 8 March 2013 and was also rumoured to be working on a debut solo album. In May 2013, Steele revealed that he and Johns were completing the project that they had started in 2008.

In January 2014, Johns co-wrote the song "Impossible", released by Australian rapper 360, and also sang on the song's chorus. Johns met 360 through his brother Heath, who is also 360's publisher.

In 2016, Johns was a musical director and arranged and produced the music for the Netflix animated children's series Beat Bugs. He was also the singing voice for the characters Walter, and Mr. Mudwasp. He stated, "It's a dream job to go into the studio and dissect all of The Beatles' music". Johns said that Eddie Vedder liked his version with the guide vocals for "Magical Mystery Tour" so much that he kept Johns's backing vocals in the finished song.

In May 2016 Johns collaborated with Perth duo Slumberjack on their track "Open Fire", and also featured in the music video. In the same year he co-wrote and provided uncredited backing vocals to 'Say It' from Flume's Skin LP.

Johns has also worked with artists such as Zhu in the track "Modern Conversation" in 2017 and fellow Australian artist What So Not in the album Not All The Beautiful Things, released in 2018, where he contributed to a good portion of the music.

Johns premiered the band 'Boom Tish' back in 2017. They've released just one song, a cover of the Easybeats' 'Hello, How Are You'. However, band members Beau Golden and Dave Jenkins Jnr both posted new photos of Boom Tish in the studio in January 2020. Boom Tish evolved out of Johns' live band for his consecutive Sydney Opera House shows in 2015.

Johns teamed up with Luke Steele from Empire of the Sun to form Dreams, releasing the single "No One Defeats Us" in March 2018. Dreams' debut album, No One Defeats Us, was released in September 2018 through EMI.

=== Solo career (2013–present) ===
In November 2013, it was reported by various media outlets that Johns was in the process of working on a solo album due for release sometime in 2014. His manager John Watson was quoted as saying: "it's looking extremely likely that it'll be out next year."

For the 40th birthday of the Triple J radio station, Beat the Drum, held at The Domain, Sydney, on 16 January 2015, Johns performed a piano version of Nirvana's "Smells Like Teen Spirit".

Johns debuted a new song as a solo artist on 29 January 2015 on Triple J. Titled "Aerial Love", Peter Vincent, National Music Editor of The Sydney Morning Herald, described the song as "sexy" and "soulful". "Aerial Love" debuted at No. 50 on the Australian Singles Chart, later peaking at No. 21. Johns released his fifteen-track debut album as a solo artist on 22 May 2015, entitled Talk. The record features multilayered arrangements of R&B, soul, synthpop, and electronic melodies. Talk peaked at No. 2 on the ARIA Albums Chart in Australia within the first two weeks of its release. The album also achieved some unexpected success in other parts of the world, coming in at No. 1 on the Slovak iTunes albums chart shortly after release.

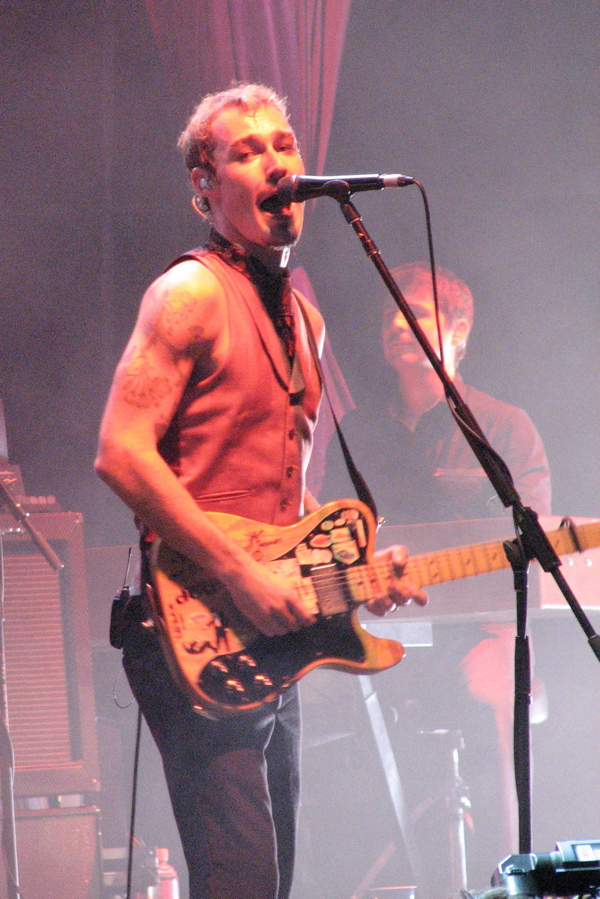
Daniel Johns performing at the Across the Great Divide Tour in September 2007

In October 2021, Johns released a Spotify Original Podcast, Who Is Daniel Johns?, of which he is both the host and subject. The five-part podcast, produced by Kaitlyn Sawrey, Amelia Chappelow and Frank Lopez, features interviews with key figures in Johns' life, including ex-wife Natalie Imbruglia, Paul Mac, Van Dyke Parks and Billy Corgan. Who Is Daniel Johns? became Spotify's most popular podcast in Australia. In an October 2021 interview on Network 10's The Project to promote the podcast, Johns said that while he still plans to work on new music, he may never play live again.

On 7 December 2021, Johns announced via a personal letter to fans that his second solo album, FutureNever, would be released on 1 April 2022; however, this was later pushed back to 22 April. The album was made available for pre-order on the FutureNever.art website. FutureNever is the first album Johns released on his own label via a new global deal with BMG.

== Legal issues ==
On 28 October 2014, Johns was stopped by police when they spotted his black Jaguar travelling at a speed of between 70 and 80 kilometres per hour (43 and 50 mph) along Morgan Street in Merewether, which is governed by a speed limit of 50 kilometres per hour (31 mph). Johns, who was arrested for driving under the influence, told police that he had consumed four large glasses of wine. He reappeared in Newcastle Local Court in February 2015 and was convicted of mid-range drunk driving, receiving an $880 fine and disqualification from driving until June 2015, and was required to attend a traffic offenders course.

In March 2022, Johns was again charged with a DUI (this time in the high range, testing 0.157, more than three times the legal limit) after his SUV crossed to the wrong side of the Pacific Highway at North Arm Cove and collided with a van travelling in the opposite direction. A woman passenger of the van was hospitalised, but there were no serious injuries and she was released from the hospital that same night. Johns said he had been medicating with alcohol to deal with his PTSD, anxiety and depression, and he would be admitting himself to a rehabilitation centre. On 7 July 2022, he was sentenced. The judge said the charge was serious, but Johns' background and circumstances were exceptional, and gave him a relatively light punishment by disqualifying him from driving for seven months and a 10-month intensive corrections order.

On 11 August 2019, The Sunday Telegraph and the Daily Mail published a false story about Johns, alleging that he had been spending his time at a notorious Sydney S&M brothel and bondage club called The Kastle. Johns denied the allegations and sued The Sunday Telegraph and the Daily Mail for defamation. The Telegraph's publisher, News Corp, paid Johns a $470,000 settlement. The Sunday Telegraph issued a retraction and apology to Johns on 3 May 2020. The Daily Mail issued a retraction and apology on 8 August 2020.

== Personal life ==
=== Health ===
In late 1997, during the Freak Show tour, Johns experienced depression. In 2004, Johns spoke at length to ABC interviewer Andrew Denton about his battle with anorexia nervosa at that time, saying that he weighed less than 50 kg (110 lb) at his thinnest. He also revealed that at one point he had considered suicide. However, he was by then married to singer Natalie Imbruglia, who provided him with emotional support, and he was healthy.

After recording Diorama, Johns was diagnosed with a rare but serious case of reactive arthritis. After treatment in Los Angeles, he was able to tour with the band for the Across the Night Tour.

After putting Silverchair into "indefinite hibernation" in 2011, Johns retreated to his home in Merewether, later stating "I felt like I was losing who I was". He checked the surf conditions obsessively every morning even though he had not surfed since his teens. By his own admission, he spent four years hiding and shutting things out. He kept company with his shar-pei–whippet crossbred dog named Gia, watched movies with the blinds closed, and ordered online grocery deliveries.

=== Animal rights ===
Johns is known for his animal rights support, having revealed that he was a vegan in 1998, although it was stated that he was a pescetarian in 2009. The Neon Ballroom song "Spawn Again" features Johns' views on animal liberation.

=== Relationships ===
In 1999, Johns met Australian actress, singer, and model Natalie Imbruglia backstage at a Silverchair concert in London. They started dating after meeting again at the ARIA awards after-party at the Gazebo Hotel in Sydney in October of the same year. After years of an on-and-off relationship, Johns announced their engagement shortly before Christmas 2002, and they married on New Year's Eve 2003. Johns wrote the song "Satisfied" for Imbruglia's 2005 album Counting Down the Days, which he also produced, and co-wrote the song "Want" from Imbruglia's 2009 album Come to Life. Imbruglia wrote her 2005 single "Counting Down the Days" about their long-distance relationship, as Imbruglia was based in London and Johns in Newcastle. On 4 January 2008, they announced that they were divorcing, stating, "We have simply grown apart through not being able to spend enough time together."

In 2008, Johns was dating Australian model Louise Van der Vorst. In 2009, the couple moved from Australia to New York City so that Van der Vorst could expand her modelling career. By July 2011, the couple were living together in Newcastle, Australia. They split in 2012.

Johns commenced a relationship with former model Michelle Leslie in October 2016. They broke up in 2019.

== Discography ==
=== Studio albums ===
Title	Album details	Peak chart positions	Certifications
Title	Album details	AUS	Certifications
Talk	Released: 22 May 2015; Label: Eleven; Format: CD, digital download, LP	2	
FutureNever	Released: 22 April 2022; Label: BMG Music Australia; Format: CD, digital download, streaming, LP, cassette	1	ARIA: Silver

=== Singles ===
==== As lead artist ====
Title	Year	Peak chart positions	Album
Title	Year	AUS	Album
"Aerial Love"	2015	21	Talk
"Cool on Fire"	2015	68	Talk
"Going on 16"	2015	—	Talk
"I Feel Electric" (featuring Moxie Raia)	2022	—	FutureNever
"—" denotes a recording that did not chart.

==== As featured artist ====
Title	Year	Peak chart positions	Album
Title	Year	AUS	Album
"Impossible" (360 featuring Daniel Johns)	2014	25	Utopia
"Open Fire" (Slumberjack featuring Daniel Johns)	2016	—	non album single
"Be OK Again" (What So Not featuring Daniel Johns)	2017	—	Not All the Beautiful Things
"—" denotes a recording that did not chart.

== Awards and nominations ==
=== AIR Awards ===
The Australian Independent Record Awards (commonly known informally as AIR Awards) is an annual awards night to recognise, promote and celebrate the success of Australia's Independent Music sector.

Year	Nominee / work	Award	Result	Ref.
2023	FutureNever	Independent Album of the Year	Nominated	
2023	FutureNever	Best Independent Pop Album or EP	Won	

=== APRA Awards ===
The APRA Awards are held in Australia and New Zealand by the Australasian Performing Right Association to recognise songwriting skills, sales and airplay performance by its members annually.

Year	Nominee / work	Award	Result	Ref.
2008	"Straight Lines"	Song of the Year	Won	
2008	"Straight Lines"	Most Played Australian Work	Won	
2008	Daniel Johns	Songwriter of the Year	Won	
2016	"Aerial Love"	Song of the Year	Shortlisted	
2023	"I Feel Electric"	Song of the Year	Nominated	

=== ARIA Music Awards ===
The ARIA Music Awards is an annual awards ceremony held by the Australian Recording Industry Association.

Year	Nominee / work	Award	Result	Ref.
2002	Silverchair's Diorama	Producer of the Year	Won	
2015	Daniel Johns Talk	Best Male Artist	Nominated	
2015	Lorin Askill for Daniel Johns – "Aerial Love"	Best Video	Nominated	
2022	FutureNever	Best Solo Artist	Nominated	
