= When We Fall (All Our Exes Live in Texas album) =

Studio album by All Our Exes Live in Texas
- Released: 3 March 2017
- Length: 40:44
- Label: All Our Exes Live in Texas, ABC Music

All Our Exes Live in Texas chronology
All Our Exes Live in Texas (2014)	When We Fall (2017)

Singles from When We Fall
- 1. "Tell Me" Released: 2016; 2. "Sailboat" Released: 2016; 3. "The Devil's Part" Released: 2017

When We Fall is the debut studio album by Australian folk group All Our Exes Live in Texas. The album was released in March 2017 and peaked at number 8 on the ARIA Charts.

At the ARIA Music Awards of 2017, When We Fall won the ARIA Award for Best Blues and Roots Album.

At the 2018 AIR Awards, it wan Best Independent Blues and Roots Album.

== Reception ==
Double J described the album "kind of like those people who somehow look incredible, even though they're in the midst of an emotional breakdown. You know there's pain there, but it's so hard to see it beyond the veneer of perfection that you just presume everything is okay. But the lyrics here tell us that it is not." The concluded the review saying, "A band of any age would consider When We Fall a monumentally accomplished album, as a debut it's astounding. Perhaps future records will see them inject a bit more grit into their sound, in which case they will be unstoppable."

Denise Hylands from Stack Magazine said "Hauntingly beautiful four-part harmonies will sweep you away through songs filled with humour and melancholy on When We Fall". Hylands called it "A wonderful debut album highlighting their indie folksy-country sound, inspiring songs and magical voices."

== Track listing ==
All tracks written by Hannah Crofts, Georgia Mooney, Elana Stone, Katie Wighton

No.	Title	Length
1.	"The Devil's Part"	3:38
2.	"I'm Gonna Get My Heart Cut Out"	3:26
3.	"Boundary Road"	3:24
4.	"When the Sun Comes Up"	3:55
5.	"Tell Me"	3:30
6.	"Parking Lot"	3:04
7.	"Candle"	3:14
8.	"Sailboat"	2:50
9.	"Oh Lover of Mine"	4:20
10.	"Don't Cry"	3:23
11.	"Childhood Home"	2:13
12.	"Cadillac"	1:20

== Charts ==
Chart (2017)	Peak position
Australian Albums (ARIA)	8

== Release history ==
Country	Date	Format	Label	Catalogue
Australia	3 March 2017	Digital download, CD, LP	All Our Exes Live in Texas, ABC Music	5716691
