= Shake It Like This =

Studio album by Lah-Lah
- Released: January 2009
- Recorded: November–December 2008
- Genre: Children's
- Length: 35:00
- Producer: Mark and Tina Harris

Lah-Lah chronology
| Shake It Like This (2009) | Lah-Lah's Big Live Band (2009) |

Shake It Like This is the first album from Australian children's band Lah-Lah. It was released independently coinciding with Lah-Lah's debut live season at the Seymour Centre in Sydney in January 2009.

== Track listing ==
1. "Lah-Lah's Big Live Band" (M & T Harris)
2. "Shake It Like This" (M & T Harris)
3. "The Band On The Bus" (Trad. arr. M & T Harris)
4. "Five More Minutes" (M & T Harris)
5. "Mister Saxophone" (M & T Harris)
6. "Brush Your Teeth" (M & T Harris)
7. "Rainbow Colours" (M, T & L Harris)
8. "Aah Choo Gesundheit" (M & T Harris)
9. "Meeney Miney Moe" (M, T & L Harris)
10. "I Don't Want a Dog" (A Ely/M & T Harris)
11. "Hiding" (M & T Harris)
12. "Birds" (M & T Harris)
13. "If You're Happy And You Know It" (Trad. arr. M & T Harris)
14. "Lola Loves To Dance" (M & T Harris)
15. "There Are Many Stars" (M & T Harris)
16. "Tom Tom" (M & T Harris)
17. "Let's Put On A Show" (K Johnson/M & T Harris)

== Personnel ==
1. Tina Harris (Lah-Lah) - Vocals
2. Mark Harris (Buzz) - vocals/double bass
3. Jess Ciampa (Tom Tom) - drums/percussion/backing vocals
4. Marcello Maio (Squeezy Sneezy) - accordion/piano/keyboards
5. Matt Ottignon (Mr Saxophone) - tenor sax/soprano sax/clarinet/flute
