= Hey Everybody =

Hey Everybody may refer to:

- "Hey Everybody!", a 2015 song by 5 Seconds of Summer
- "Hey Everybody" (DJ Company song), 1994
- "Hey Everybody", a 2002 song by Jennifer Love Hewitt from the album BareNaked
- "Hey Everybody", a 2004 song by the Bormfunk MC's from the album Reverse Psychology
- "Hey Everybody", a 1981 single by People's Choice
- "Hey Everybody", a 1977 song by Debby Boone from the album You Light Up My Life
- "Hey Hey Everybody", a 2011 song by Lah-Lah from the album Making Music Lah-Lah's Way
