= The Tango Saloon =

- Origin: Sydney, New South Wales, Australia
- Genres: Tango, Spaghetti Western, Experimental music
- Years active: 2005–present
- Labels: Ipecac, Rufus, Romero
- Members: Julian Curwin; Marcello Maio; Sam Golding; John Hibbard; Mark Harris; Danny Heifetz; Jess Ciampa; Elana Stone
- Website: Official website

The Tango Saloon is an Australian experimental tango band from Sydney. Their self-titled debut, a "tango-flavored album with a twist of spaghetti western", was released in 2006 by Ipecac Recordings, the American record label run by Mike Patton and Greg Werckman. It was described by Greg Prato of AllMusic (All Music Guide) as "a musical breath of fresh air in the often foul-smelling state of modern popular music". Three albums have followed, Transylvania (2008), Shadows & Fog (2012) and Suspicion (2015) featuring vocalist Elana Stone. In June 2007, the band was seen supporting Ipecac label-mates Peeping Tom on the East-coast leg of their Australian tour. Other notable performances include support for Mondo Cane at Sydney Festival 2012, and for Marc Ribot in 2015 (with The Mango Balloon).

== Band members ==
The Tango Saloon's lineup includes a number of notable musicians, including drummer Danny Heifetz from Mr. Bungle and Secret Chiefs 3. Bandleader Julian Curwin plays on occasion in Monsieur Camembert, along with accordionist Marcello Maio and double bassist Mark Harris. Band members' other projects include Darth Vegas, Hermitude, Marsala, Baby et Lulu and The Fantastic Terrific Munkle. Transylvania also features a guest vocal from Mike Patton on the track Dracula Cha Cha.

The list of members:

Live band:

- Julian Curwin – guitar, keyboards
- Marcello Maio – accordion, keyboards
- Sam Golding – tuba, trumpet
- John Hibbard – trombone
- Mark Harris – double bass
- Danny Heifetz – drums, percussion
- Jess Ciampa – percussion
- Elana Stone – vocals

Other musicians/guests:

- Shenton Gregory – violin, viola
- Christian Watson – alto & baritone sax
- Leonie Cohen – piano
- Svetlana Bunic – accordion
- Alon Ilsar – drums, electronics
- Luke Dubber – keyboards
- Martin Kay – clarinets
- Reuben Derrick – tenor sax
- Kory Horwood – double bass
- Jane Sheldon – vocals
- Brian Campeau – vocals
- Ilan Kidron – vocals
- Mike Patton – vocals

=== Other activities ===
In 2010, band leader Julian Curwin started a stripped-back chamber version of The Tango Saloon, named The Mango Balloon, with a lighter sound adding lounge, exotica and continental jazz to the larger band’s tango/western blend. Aside from six members from The Tango Saloon, the recordings also feature special guests, bringing their own distinct flavour to the music - The Mango Balloon: Volume 1 (2010) with Eddie Bronson, Volume 2 (2012) with Brian Campeau, Volume 3 (2014) with Shenton Gregory, and Volume 4 (2017) with Matt McMahon.

Other related releases include Crossing (2018) with Jane Sheldon, Midnight Lullaby (2020) and Second Sight (2022) with Stu Hunter, Lloyd Swanton and Jess Ciampa. In 2022, Curwin developed The Golden Strangers, a quartet following in the spaghetti western footsteps of The Tango Saloon, in which he plays banjo and melodica alongside Ollie Thorpe (pedal steel guitar, vocals), Brendan Clark (bass) and Jamie Cameron (drums).

== Discography ==
=== Studio albums ===
Title	Details
The Tango Saloon	Released: 2006; Label: Ipecac Recordings (IPC075); Format: CD, digital download
Transylvania	Released: 2008/2012 re-release; Label: Romero Records (ROM003); Format: CD, digital download
Shadows & Fog	Released: 2012; Label: Romero Records (ROM001); Format: CD, digital download
Suspicion	Released: 2015; Label: Romero Records (ROM010); Format: CD, digital download
