= All Our Exes Live in Texas =

Australian musical group

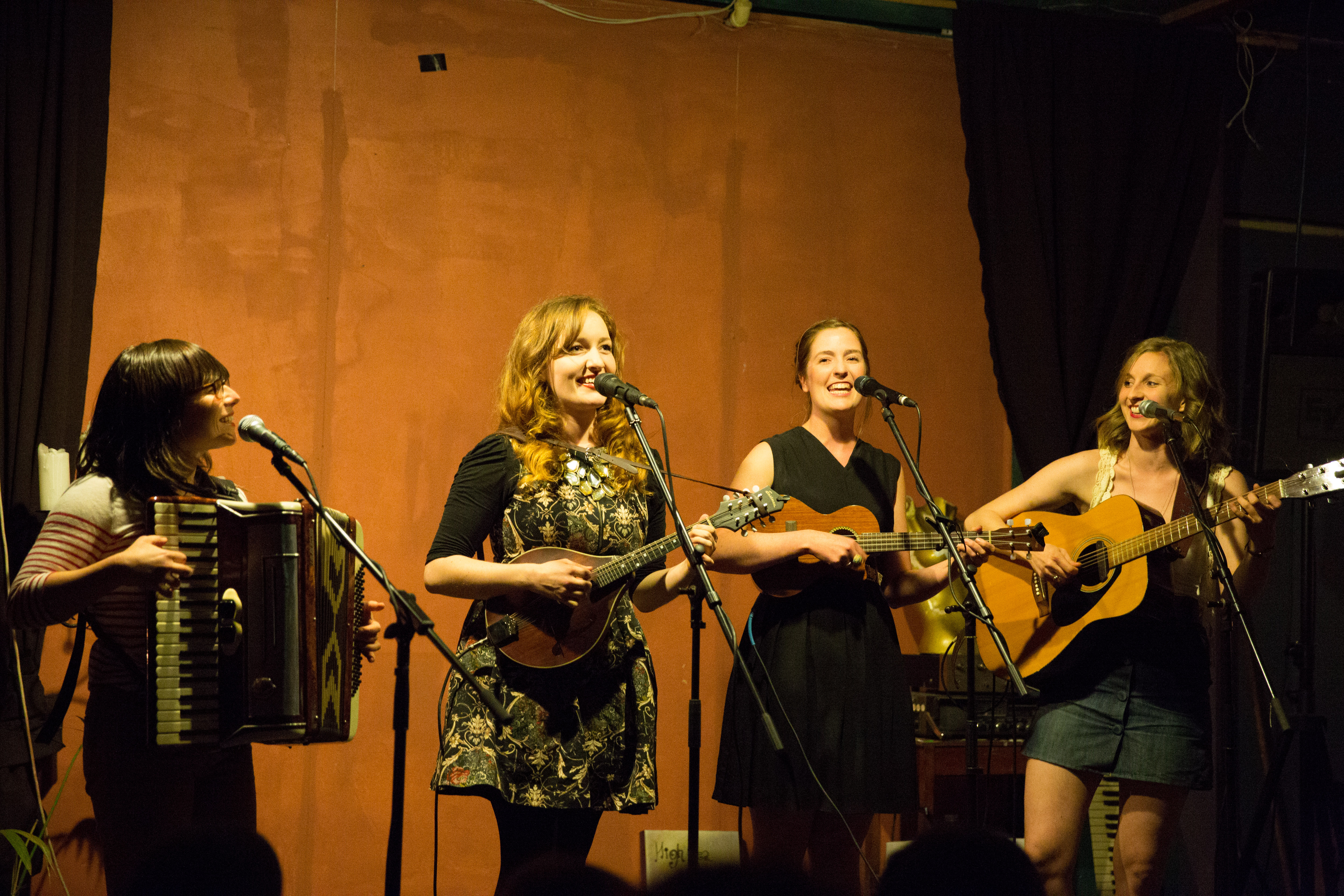
- Elana Stone, Georgia Mooney, Hannah Crofts, Katie Wighton (l to r)

Background information
- Origin: Sydney, Australia
- Genres: Folk; alternative country
- Years active: 2014–2024
- Label: ABC Music
- Spinoffs: Baby Velvet
- Members: Hannah Crofts; Georgia Mooney; Elana Stone; Katie Wighton
- Website: allourexesliveintexas.com

All Our Exes Live in Texas were an Australian folk group, consisting of Hannah Crofts (vocals & ukulele), Georgia Mooney (vocals & mandolin), Elana Stone (vocals & accordion) and Katie Wighton (vocals & guitar). The four artists combined at an O Brother, Where Art Thou? tribute show in 2014. The group name was adapted from the George Strait song "All My Exes Live in Texas", which they chose for its "funny and ironic" nature.

At the ARIA Music Awards of 2017, the group won ARIA Award for Best Blues and Roots Album, for the critically acclaimed debut album When We Fall.

All Our Exes Live In Texas have toured with Midnight Oil, The Backstreet Boys, Passenger, Nathaniel Rateliff & The Night Sweats, Tiny Ruins, Megan Washington, Kate Miller-Heidke, Mama Kin and Boy & Bear.

== Discography ==
=== Studio albums ===
List of extended plays with relevant details
Title	Details	Peak chart positions
Title	Details	AUS
When We Fall	Released: 3 March 2017; Label: ABC Music; Format: CD, digital download, vinyl	8

=== Extended plays ===
List of extended plays, with selected details
Title	EP details
All Our Exes Live in Texas	Released: January 2014; Label: All Our Exes Live in Texas; Format: CD, digital download

=== Singles ===
Year	Title	Album
2015	"Our Love Won't Die"	All Our Exes Live in Texas
2016	"Tell Me"	When We Fall
2016	"Sailboat"	When We Fall
2017	"The Devil's Part"	When We Fall
2017	"Eventually"	non album single

== Awards and nominations ==
=== AIR Awards ===
The Australian Independent Record Awards (commonly known informally as AIR Awards) is an annual awards night to recognise, promote and celebrate the success of Australia's Independent Music sector.

Year	Nominee / work	Award	Result
2018	When We Fall	Best Independent Blues and Roots Album	Won

=== APRA Awards ===
The APRA Awards are presented annually from 1982 by the Australasian Performing Right Association (APRA), "honouring composers and songwriters".

Year	Nominee / work	Award	Result	Ref.
2018	"Cadillac" (Katherine Wighton, Hannah Crofts, Georgia Mooney, Elana Stone)	Song of the Year	Shortlisted	

=== ARIA Music Awards ===
The ARIA Music Awards is an annual awards ceremony held by the Australian Recording Industry Association.

Year	Nominee / work	Award	Result
2017	When We Fall	Best Blues & Roots Album	Won

=== National Live Music Awards ===
The National Live Music Awards (NLMAs) commenced in 2016 to recognise contributions to the live music industry in Australia.

Year	Nominee / work	Award	Result
2016	themselves	Live Roots Act of the Year	Nominated
2017	themselves	Live Country or Folk Act of the Year	Won
2017	themselves	International Live Achievement (Group)	Nominated
2017	themselves	Best Live Act of the Year - People's Choice	Nominated
2018	themselves	Live Blues and Roots Act of the Year	Won
2018	Hannah Marjorie Crofts (All Our Exes Live in Texas)	Live Instrumentalist of the Year	Nominated
