= Lah-Lah's Adventures =

- Created by: Tina Harris; Mark Harris; Deb Ryan
- Directed by: Deb Ryan
- Starring: Tina Harris; Mark Harris; Nic Cecire; Gary Daley; Matt Ottignon
- Composers: Mark Harris; Tina Harris
- Countries of origin: Australia; Canada
- Original language: English
- No. of seasons: 1
- No. of episodes: 26

Production
- Executive producers: Grahame Grassby; Delna Bhesania; Leonard Terhoch; Frank Saperstein
- Producers: Deb Ryan; Delna Bhesania
- Production location: Sydney
- Cinematography: Mick Jones
- Editors: Mick Jones; Linda Ung
- Running time: 12 minutes
- Production companies: Stella Projects; Bardel Entertainment

Original release
- Network: 7TWO (Australia); Cbeebies (Australia); Knowledge Kids (Canada); BBC Kids (Canada)
- Release: 28 April – 15 May 2014

Lah-Lah's Adventures is a pre-school music television series. It went to air on 7TWO on 28 April 2014, for 26 episodes of 12 minutes. It also aired on CBeebies in Australia as well as on BBC Kids and Knowledge Network in Canada.

The series was produced by Stella Projects and Bardel Entertainment and distributed internationally by Bardel Entertainment.

Lah-Lah's Adventures used both live action and animation to tell stories using music. Each episode’s story takes place in Lah-Lah Land.

The show showcases the eponymous live band, Lah-Lah, who introduce children to music and musical instruments.

== Episodes ==
Season 1

01 - High Or Low For The Show 02 - Where's Mister Saxophone? 03 - Where's My Toothbrush? 04 - Shiny New Shoes 05 - Aah Choo! 06 - Five More Minutes 07 - Lah-Lah's New Dance 08 - We're A Family 09 - Music For Everyone 10 - Buzz's Writing Song 11 - Noisy Noisy Birds 12 - A Birthday Surprize 13 - Music Makes Me Feel So Good 14 - Boom Chaka 15 - Secret Band Business 16 - Brassy Babble 17 - Squeezy Visits The Dentist 18 - Mister Saxophone Loses His Groove 19 - Dancing Doll 20 - Parade Day 21 - Nothing To Sneeze About 22 - A Backwards Day 23 - Tom Tom's Tinkering 24 - I'm Not Sleepy 25 - Buzz Gets Braver 26 - Bad Hair Day
