= Lah-Lah =

- Also known as: Lah-Lah's Big Live Band
- Genre: Children's, live action
- Created by: Mark and Tina Harris
- Directed by: Deb Ryan
- Starring: Nic Cecire; Gary Daley; Tina Harris; Mark Harris; Matt Ottignon
- Composers: Mark and Tina Harris
- Country of origin: Australia
- Original language: English
- No. of seasons: 1
- No. of episodes: 12

Production
- Executive producers: Tina and Mark Harris
- Producer: Mick Jones
- Production location: Sydney
- Cinematography: David Wakeley
- Editors: Mick Jones and Linda Ung
- Running time: 12 × 2 minutes
- Production company: Lah-Lah Productions/LitUp Digital

Original release
- Network: Nick Jr. Australia
- Release: 13 September 2009

Lah-Lah is a five-member children's music group from Sydney, Australia. Lah-Lah has both recorded albums and filmed television content, and also performs at live events. The music of Lah-Lah ranges in styles from world music and surf-rock to jazz and gypsy. Lah-Lah's repertoire is primarily composed by Mark and Tina Harris. Lah-Lah aims to introduce music and musical instruments to children and their families through fun and entertainment.

== Live ==
Lah-Lah performed at the Sutherland Entertainment Centre, Seymour Centre and Parramatta Town Hall in January 2009 for its inaugural season.

In October 2009 Century Venues children's entertainment arm Century's Child produced Lah-Lah into the Enmore Theatre for a two-week run of proms style concerts for kids.

Lah-Lah opened the entertainment on the main stage of The Domain, Sydney for celebrations on Australia Day 2010 and was also featured at the St Kilda Festival in February.

The Sydney Opera House hosted Lah-Lah for 24 sold-out shows as part of its Babies Proms season in May 2010.

In October 2010 Lah-Lah presented a short season of 'Lah-Lah's Adventures' at the Cantebury-Hurlstone Park RSL, Mounties club and Harbord Diggers club.

In November 2010 Lah-Lah was a featured act at the Splash Festival at the Aquatic Centre at Sydney Olympic Park in Homebush.

The Sydney Festival 2011 presented the second Lah-Lah live production, 'Lah-Lah's Musical Wonderland' throughout the festival with shows at the Festival First Night in Hyde Park, The Famous Spiegeltent in Hyde Park, and The Riverside Theatre in Parramatta.

Following the May 2010 Babies Proms season, the Sydney Opera House commissioned a new show concept from Lah-Lah in the 30th anniversary year of the Babies Proms. The commission was for the inaugural presentation in a new series - the Family Proms - aimed at offering wonderful musical experiences to all primary aged children. The show, 'Lah-Lah's BIG Live Band', featuring an 11 piece big band (trumpets: Simon Sweeney, Dane Laboyrie, Ray Cassar, Elizabeth Geyer, trombones: Lucian McGuiness, Alex Silver, Justin Kearin, saxophones: Andrew 'Jock' Robertson, David Theak, Richard 'Woody the Woodwind' Maegraith, Stephan Schafer), twenty child violinists as well as twenty child singer/dancers in addition to the core Lah-Lah quintet, presented 5 concerts in the Sydney Opera House Concert Hall for the House:Ed and Kids at the House Programs from 24–26 June 2011.

The Powerkidz festival at the Brisbane Powerhouse was the second interstate live show for Lah-Lah in July 2011.

In September 2011 Lah-Lah performed two shows at the opening of Darling Quarter in Darling Harbour, New South Wales.

The City of Sydney council included Lah-Lah in the program for the lighting of the Christmas Tree concert in Martin Place, Sydney in November 2011. Lah-Lah was also scheduled to perform at the Village Christmas concerts in Rushcutters Bay and Rosebery, however the shows were postponed due to poor weather. Lah-Lah subsequently performed at the Martin Place concert in November 2012 and has appeared at various Village Christmas Concerts each year.

December 2011 saw Lah-Lah continue to expand nationally with their first Western Australian concerts with performances at the Worlds Festival in Fremantle as part of the ISAF Sailing World Championships.

The Melbourne Recital Centre programmed Lah-Lah for a show in the Elizabeth Murdoch Hall as part of the Music Play children's music festival in January 2012.

Lah-Lah continue to tour nationally with concerts in Victoria at the Between the Bays festival in Mornington Peninsula, in South Australia as part of the Something on Saturday series at the Adelaide Festival Centre, the Kids Day Out festival in Sydney, the City Recital Hall Angel Place, Newcastle Museum, Floriade Nightfest in Canberra, Broadbeach Jazz Festival, Glebe Street Fair, Sydney Festival, World's Biggest Playgroup, Roola Boola festival in Melbourne, and the Dress Up Attack festival in Sydney amongst others.

== Audio ==
Lah-Lah recorded its debut album Shake It Like This in November 2008 at Sydney's Megaphon Studios. Lah-Lah recorded its second album Making Music Lah-Lah's Way in 2011 at Sydney's Megaphon Studios. Lah-Lah recorded its third album Sing It Loud! in 2014 at Sydney's Trackdown Digital. Lah-Lah albums are currently independently released and available exclusively from their official website. Shake It Like This is also available digitally from the Australian iTunes Store.

On 30 October 2015 an announcement was made by the band that Lah-Lah had been signed by Sony Music and the Lah-Lah's Adventures Sound Track album would be available from 6 November 2015.

== Video/TV ==
In July 2009 Lah-Lah went to Down Under studios, Sydney with production company LitUp Digital to film 12 music video clips from the Shake It Like This album. Other elements were shot in addition to the clips and together they will form the Lah-Lah debut music DVD Lah-Lah's Big Live Band.

Also in July, Lah-Lah signed a broadcast agreement with Nickelodeon Australia for the video clips. The Lah-Lah clips went on air daily on Nickelodeon Australia's preschool channel Nick Jr. Australia on 13 September 2009. The clips stopped airing on Nick Jr. Australia at the end of 2014.

In February 2010 the clips were licensed to Nickelodeon Southeast Asia and also Nickelodeon New Zealand and began airing during March 2010.

In April 2013 Lah-Lah went into production on series 1 of a television program entitled Lah-Lah's Adventures, producing 26 x 12-minute episodes of a live action and animation preschool music show. The show was broadcast in April 2014 on the Seven Network's 7Two on free to air television in Australia, and began a rolling broadcast in September 2014 on CBeebies on Foxtel/Austar in Australia and New Zealand, and BBC Kids and Knowledge Network in Canada.

ABC TV acquired the broadcast rights to Lah-Lah's Adventures season 1 at the end of 2014 and it commenced a rolling broadcast on ABC Kids (Australia) and ABC iView from 4 January 2015.

The series is an Australian-Canadian official co-production produced by Stella Projects in Australia and Bardel Entertainment in Canada.

Another series starring Lah-Lah was introduced titled Lah-Lahs Stripy Sock Club which aired on ABC Kids in 2019 producing 18 x 7-minute episodes.

== Group Members ==
Nic Cecire as Tom Tom (drums/percussion/backing vocals)
Gary Daley as Squeezy Sneezy (piano accordion/keyboards)
Tina Harris as Lah-Lah (vocals)
Mark Harris as Buzz The Band Leader and Lola Double Bass (double bass/vocals)
Matt Ottignon as Mr Saxophone (tenor and soprano saxophones/clarinet/flute)

== Reviews ==
Live Show Review - Sydney Festival 2011 - Daily Telegraph. 18 January 2011
Live Show Review - Enmore Theatre 2009 - Arts Rocket. 8 October 2009

== Discography ==
- Shake It Like This (2008) - Audio CD
- Lah-Lah's Big Live Band (2009) - DVD
- Making Music Lah-Lah's Way (2011) - Audio CD
- Lah-Lah's Adventures - Brand New Day (2014) - DVD
- Sing It Loud! (2014) - Audio CD
- Having Fun! (2017) - Audio CD
- 10th Birthday Party (2018) - Audio CD

== Awards and nominations ==
=== ARIA Music Awards ===
The ARIA Music Awards is an annual ceremony presented by Australian Recording Industry Association (ARIA), which recognise excellence, innovation, and achievement across all genres of the music of Australia. They commenced in 1987.

Year	Nominee / work	Award	Result	Ref.
2017	Having Fun!	Best Children's Album	Nominated	
2018	10th Birthday Party	Best Children's Album	Nominated	
