= In Siberia Tonight =

Australian TV series

- Starring: Steve Abbott; The Kransky Sisters; Indira Naidoo; Marcello Maio
- Country of origin: Australia
- Original language: English
- No. of seasons: 2
- No. of episodes: 21

Original release
- Network: SBS
- Release: 9 September 2004 – 24 December 2005

In Siberia Tonight is an Australian comedy talk show which aired on SBS for two seasons, from 2005 to 2006, and featured 21 episodes.

The program was hosted by comedian Steve Abbott ('The Sandman') and was themed around his Russian heritage. The program commonly featured musical comedy trio The Kransky Sisters, Indira Naidoo, Steve's mum Evelyn Abbott and jazz pianist and composer Marcello Maio.

== Cast ==
=== Main / regular ===
- Steve Abbott (host)
- The Kransky Sisters
- Indira Naidoo
- Evelyn Abbott
- Marcello Maio

=== Recurring ===
- Lawrence Leung (11 episodes)
- Akmal Saleh (8 episodes)

=== Guests ===
- Paul Capsis (2 episodes)
- Jade Macrae (2 episodes)
- David McCormack (2 episodes)
- The Umbilical Brothers (1 episode)
- Christine Anu (1 episode)
- Wil Anderson (1 episode)
- John Safran (1 episode)
- Diesel (1 episode)
- Alex Perry (1 episode)
- Kostya Tszyu (1 episode)
- Margaret Fulton (1 episode)
- Jeannie Little (1 episode)
- Anh Do (1 episode)
- Noeline Brown (1 episode)
- Tania Zaetta (1 episode)
- Stirling Mortlock (1 episode)
