= Elana Stone =

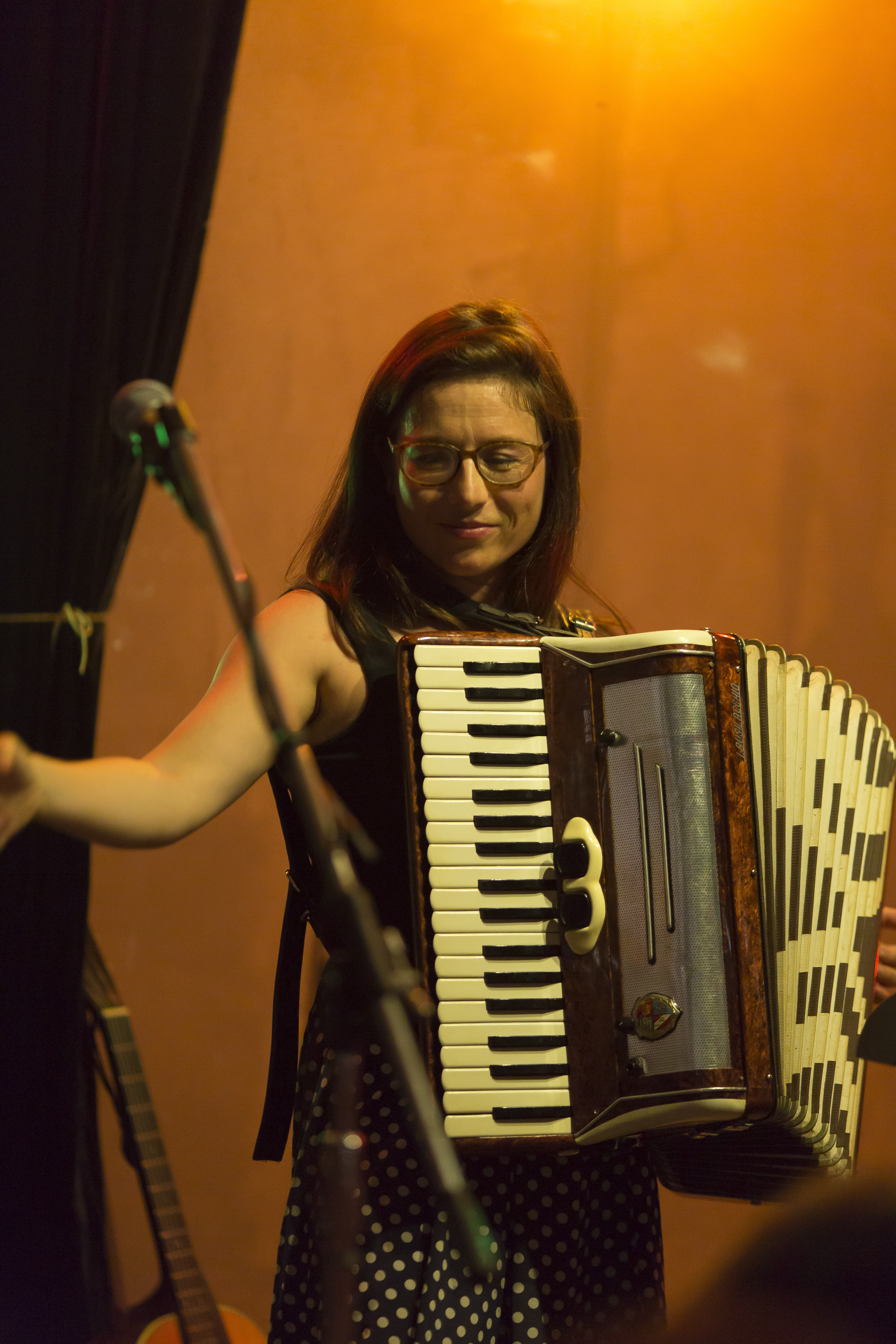
- Elana Stone, February 2016

Background information
- Origin: Sydney, Australia
- Genres: Jazz, folk, pop
- Occupation: Musician
- Instruments: Vocals, piano, accordion
- Years active: 2004–present
- Labels: Jazzgroove, MGM
- Formerly of: All Our Exes Live in Texas; The Rescue Ships
- Website: elanastone.com.au

Elana Stone is an Australian singer, songwriter, multi-instrumentalist and bandleader. Her debut solo album, In the Garden of Wild Things, was released in 2005 on the Jazzgroove label. Its follow-up, Your Anniversary, was released in 2009, while her third and fourth albums (Kintsugi and Married To The Sound) were released independently in 2015 and 2024, respectively. She was also a member of the ARIA award–winning folk quartet All Our Exes Live in Texas, in which she provided vocals and played the accordion.

Outside of her solo career and her work with All Our Exes Live in Texas, Stone has worked with The Tango Saloon, and has toured with The Cat Empire, Bluejuice, Jackson Jackson, Tripod and the John Butler Trio. She is currently a backing vocalist and keyboardist in the touring band for Missy Higgins.

== Early life and education ==
Elana Stone is the elder daughter of Harry Stone, an architect, and Judy Stone, a palliative care nurse. She grew up in Sydney with her older brother, singer and actor Jake Stone (formerly of Bluejuice) and her younger sister, actress Yael Stone. She undertook piano lessons while attending Balmain Public School. Stone studied music at Newtown High School of the Performing Arts, the Sydney Conservatorium of Music and completed a Bachelor of Music at the Australian National University's School of Music in Canberra.

== Career ==
While at university Stone met several musicians who worked with her later. She formed the Elana Stone Quartet (sometimes expanded to Elana Stone Quintet) as a jazz ensemble. In 2004 she was named Best Jazz Artist at the Musicoz Awards. She won a National Jazz Award at the 2005 Wangaratta Jazz Festival. Her debut album, In the Garden of Wild Things, was released via Jazzgroove Records, which John Shand of The Sydney Morning Herald described her singing as "sensational – imaginative, deft, accurate, tonally beautiful."

For the album, the Elana Stone Band line-up was Brett Hirst on bass guitar, Evan Mannell on drums, James Muller on guitar and Sean Wayland on piano, Rhodes and organ. Assisting in the studio were Jeremy Borthwick and John Hibbard on trombone, Simon Ferenci on trumpet, Aaron Flower on guitar, James Hauptmann on atmospheric sounds, Zoe Hauptmann on bass guitar, Steve Marin on congas and a choir from Newtown High School of the Performing Arts.

By 2008, the Elana Stone Band comprised Stone on lead vocals and keyboards, Flower on guitar, Hauptmann on bass guitar and backing vocals and Mannell on drums. "Me and Zoe went to jazz school in Canberra and Ev and Baz went to jazz school in Sydney," explained Stone in an interview.

In August 2008, Stone was invited by Deborah Conway to take part in the Broad Festival project, which toured major Australian cities including performing at the Sydney Opera House. With Stone and Conway were Laura Jean, Liz Stringer and Dianna Corcoran – they performed their own and each other's songs.

In 2010, Stone performed at the Melbourne International Comedy Festival and at Edinburgh Fringe Festival with Tripod in the show Tripod vs the Dragon. Along with Brian Campeau, Stone also featured on Passenger's 2010 album Flight of the Crow, singing harmonies on the song "Month of Sundays."

In 2011, Stone and Campeau formed the indie pop duo The Rescue Ships. The group released two singles, "On the Air" in 2011 and "City Life" in 2012, before breaking up in 2013.

In 2012 she joined Hermitude on Triple J radio's Like a Version, providing the vocals for their cover of Major Lazer's "Get Free".

In 2014, Stone formed the folk group All Our Exes Live in Texas alongside fellow singer-songwriters Hannah Crofts, Georgia Mooney and Katie Wighton. The group has gone on to tour nationally, and win the ARIA Award for Best Blues and Roots Album in 2017.

In April 2015 Stone issued her third studio album, Kintsugi, which provided three singles: "Emotions" (originally performed by Mariah Carey), "Panic Attack" and "Steely Dan". Jonny Nail of Rolling Stone (Australia) reviewed the latter single, which "lands somewhere between haunting, psychedelic-pop escapism and a gritted-teeth, stomping show of determination. "It's a break up song, but it's defiant," Stone explains, adding that 'it's not heartbroken'."

== Discography ==
=== Studio albums ===
Title	Details
In the Garden of Wild Things	Released: 2005; Label: Jazzgroove; Format: CD, digital download
Your Anniversary	Released: 2009; Label: Elena Stone / MGM (ES001); Format: CD, digital download
Kintsugi	Released: April 2015; Label: Elena Stone; Format: CD, digital download
Married To The Sound	Released: September 2024; Label: ABC Music; Format: CD, digital download

=== Soundtrack albums ===
Title	Details
Tripod Versus The Dragon (Tripod featuring Elana Stone)	Released: 2010; Label: Tripod; Format: CD, digital download; Soundtrack from Tripod's stage show Tripod Versus The Dragon

== Awards and nominations ==
=== APRA Awards ===
The APRA Awards are presented annually from 1982 by the Australasian Performing Right Association (APRA), "honouring composers and songwriters".

Year	Nominee / work	Award	Result	Ref.
2018	"Cadillac" (Katherine Wighton, Hannah Crofts, Georgia Mooney, Elana Stone)	Song of the Year	Shortlisted	

== See also ==
- All Our Exes Live in Texas
- The Tango Saloon
