= Holly Harrison =

Australian composer

Holly Phillippa Harrison (born 1988) is an Australian composer based in Western Sydney.

== Early life and education ==
Harrison grew up in the Hawkesbury region West of Sydney. She was awarded a music scholarship to attend St Paul's Grammar School for trumpet performance. During high school she began playing drum kit, performing with rock, punk and post-rock bands.

Harrison graduated from Western Sydney University School of Music with a Bachelor of Music, First Class Honours, and was awarded the University Medal. She then went on to complete a Doctorate of Creative Arts in composition at Western Sydney University.

== Career ==
Harrison's music is frequently performed across Australia and internationally. In Australia she has worked with leading orchestras including Sydney Symphony Orchestra, Melbourne Symphony Orchestra, Tasmanian Symphony Orchestra, West Australian Symphony Orchestra and the Australian Chamber Orchestra, as well as chamber ensembles including Ensemble Offspring, Omega Ensemble, and Australian String Quartet. Internationally, she has collaborated with ensembles including Eighth Blackbird, Alarm Will Sound, Goldmund Quartett, Orkest de Ereprijs.

Harrison's work Cabbages and Kings was awarded first place at the 2014 Young Composers Meeting in Apeldoorn, The Netherlands, chaired by Dutch composer Louis Andriessen.

In 2017, Harrison's Lobster Tales and Turtle Soup featured in Eighth Blackbird's Australian Tour with Musica Viva Australia. Harrison was awarded the inaugural Sue W Chamber Music Composition Prize for the work and Eighth Blackbird was later awarded Performance of the Year at the APRA Music Awards of 2018 for their performance of Lobster Tales and Turtle Soup.

From 2020-2022 Harrison was composer in residence for the Tasmanian Symphony Orchestra, in that time Harrison had five works premiered by the orchestra and conducted by Norwegian conductor Eivind Aadland.

Harrison's Splinter for Wind Ensemble, originally written for orchestra, was premiered in 2021 by San Jose State University Wind Ensemble and has been performed across the US and Australia. Splinter was a finalist in the APRA Music Awards of 2021 for the large ensemble category. Her first original work for Wind Ensemble POUNCE was commissioned by a consortium led by conductor Lucas Peterson, the work was premiered in April 2023 and later that year was selected as a finalist in the NBA/William D. Revelli Memorial Composition Contest.

In 2022, Harrison was awarded the Western Sydney University Chancellor's Alumni of the Year Award at the annual University Alumni Awards.

== Awards and nominations ==
Year	Work	Award	Result	Ref
2013	Red Queen, White Queen, Alice and All	Pyeongchon Arts Hall International Chamber Music Composition Competition	Won	
2014	Cabbages & Kings	Young Composers Meeting, Apeldoorn	Won	
2017	Lobster Tales and Turtle Soup	Sue W Chamber Music Composition Prize	Won	
2018	And Whether Pigs Have Wings	Nu Works Initiative, Nu Deco Ensemble	Won	
2018	Lobster Tales and Turtle Soup	Performance of the Year (with Eighth Blackbird), APRA Music Awards of 2018	Won	
2021	Splinter	Work of the Year, Large Ensemble, APRA Music Awards of 2021	Finalist	
2023	POUNCE	NBA/William D. Revelli Memorial Composition Contest	Finalist	
