= Katie Wighton =

Australian musical artist

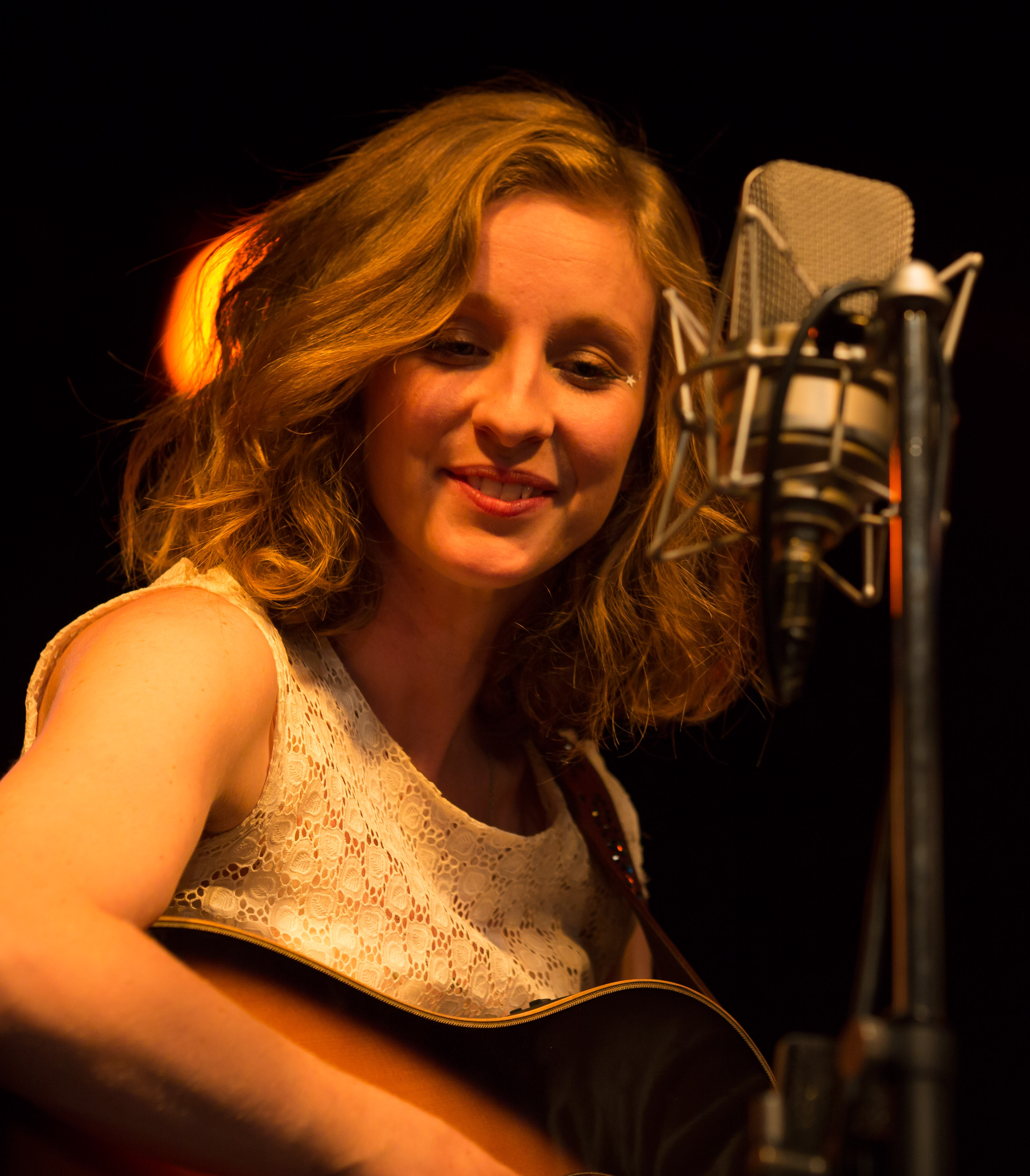
- In 2014

Background information
- Born: Katherine Wighton
- Occupation: Musician
- Instruments: Vocals, guitar
- Years active: 2013–present
- Label: ABC Music
- Member of: All Our Exes Live in Texas
- Website: www.katiewighton.com

Katie Wighton is an Australian singer, songwriter and guitarist and member of the ARIA award–winning folk quartet All Our Exes Live in Texas. Wighton released her debut extended play in 2013 and her debut solo album, The End, was released in June 2023.

== Early life and education ==
Katie Wighton grew up in Brisbane, Queensland and attended Kedron State High School, the daughter of musical parents. At the age of six, Wighton commenced learning piano. In 2015 Wighton said, "The first time I ever sang in public was in high school with the army cadet band. I was a bit of a music nerd if I'm honest; I loved my music teachers and I spent plenty of time skipping maths and practising the piano or singing with my mates".

Once she completed high school, Wighton went to University to study jazz. In 2007, Wighton was awarded the Generations in Jazz Vocal Scholarship awarded by James Morrison. In 2011, Wighton moved from Brisbane to Sydney and was a semi-finalist in the National Jazz Awards held in Wangaratta in November 2012.

== Career ==
=== 2013–present ===
In 2013 Wighton was the recipient of a Contemporary Music Touring Grant from the Australia Council for the Arts which funded her east coast regional lounge room tour which coincided with the release of her debut EP, You Are Here.

In 2014, Wighton formed the folk group All Our Exes Live in Texas alongside fellow singer-songwriters Elana Stone, Hannah Crofts and Georgia Mooney. The group has gone on to tour nationally, and win the ARIA Award for Best Blues and Roots Album in 2017.

In September 2015, Wighton released her second EP titled Oh-Dark-Hours with lead single "Little Dove". Shayen de Silva from Happy Mag said, "With an incredible vocal performance and distinctive take on melancholy, Katie Wighton exudes grace on her Oh-Dark-Hours EP".

In April 2020, Wighton released "Good Guy", the lead single from the EP under the alias, Kit. The EP was released on 13 November 2020.

In 2022 Wighton signed with ABC Music. In March 2023, Wighton announced the forthcoming release of debut studio album The End, preceded by the singles "Take You Home", "Narcissist" and "Without You".

== Discography ==
=== Studio albums ===
List of albums, with selected details
Title	Details
The End	2 June 2023; Label: ABC Music; Format: CD, LP, digital download

=== Extended plays ===
List of EPs, with selected details
Title	Details
You Are Here	Released: 2013; Label: Katie Wighton; Format: digital download
Oh-Dark-Hours	Released: September 2015; Label: Katie Wighton; Format: digital download
KIT	Released: 13 November 2020; Label: Katie Wighton; Format: digital download

== Awards and nominations ==
=== APRA Awards ===
The APRA Awards are presented annually from 1982 by the Australasian Performing Right Association (APRA), "honouring composers and songwriters".

Year	Nominee / work	Award	Result	Ref.
2018	"Cadillac" (Katherine Wighton, Hannah Crofts, Georgia Mooney, Elana Stone)	Song of the Year	Shortlisted	

=== ARIA Music Awards ===
The ARIA Music Awards is an annual award ceremony event celebrating the Australian music industry.

Year	Nominee / work	Award	Result	Ref.
2023	The End	Best Blues and Roots Album	Nominated	

== See also ==
- All Our Exes Live in Texas
