= The Kransky Sisters =

Australian musical comedy trio

The Kransky Sisters are an Australian musical comedy trio created and performed by Annie Lee ("Mourne") and Christine Johnston ("Eve") and also, initially, with Michele Watt ("Arva", 2000 to 2006) and later with Carolyn Johns ("Dawn", 2007 to present). They regularly appeared on In Siberia Tonight on SBS Television, The Sideshow with Paul McDermott on ABC Television and had guest appearances on Spicks and Specks and Adam Hills Tonight.

During their act, the Kransky Sisters tell off-beat and macabre stories accompanied by cover versions of popular songs. The fictional sisters live an old-fashioned lifestyle and travel in a 1958 Morris Major between performances. The trio's members play tuba, guitar, musical saw and a 1960s reed keyboard, as well as bizarre instruments such as toilet brushes and kitchen pots.

== History ==
The Kransky Sisters were created by Annie Lee and Christine Johnston in Brisbane in 2000. Johnston grew up in Geebung. She provides "experimental vocals, including bird calls, and uses her voice as a medium by which visual objects and the subliminal or pedestrian aspects of human experience can be interpreted. In combination with this interest [she] brings to her performances a dramatic visual component and a strong sense of personal style and humour."

Leah Mercer of RealTime Arts caught their performance of their Baggage show in November 2005, she described "their earnest delivery and spot-on arrangements mean that the [trio] never descend into cheap parody; they play for laughs but never at their characters' expense. Full of memorable moments (Talking Heads' "Psycho Killer", complete with yodeling and some wild Salvation Army tambourine moves, tops my list) Baggage unfolds as a series of stories gathered during the Kransky's recent tour of regional Queensland. Continuing that great Australian tradition of the misfit hero."

=== Fictional back story ===
The sisters come from Esk, a real rural town in Queensland. The two eldest sisters, Mourne and Eve, are full biological sisters and have lived together all their lives. Mourne and Eve's father was a travelling salesman for the (fictional) Asbestos Cookware Company. Their mother left their father to be with his brother, who is Arva and Dawn's father. The two brothers have not spoken since and Mourne and Eve ostracise Arva and Dawn, using their guilt over the affair to dominate them.

Arva, who first toured with the family band, has now joined the Hornbell Military Marching Band. Dawn, the youngest sister, has taken leave from her job as trolley librarian at the Esk Hospital and now tours in Arva's place. The sisters wear the same clothes and Mourne and Eve speak with similar mannerisms. Mourne, the eldest, is clearly the matriarch, sternly keeping control of her younger sisters and doing most of the speaking during a concert, while Eve, a vegetarian who harbours secret passions, eerily echoes many of Mourne's phrases, though she has enough independence to occasionally add to Mourne's stories. Arva and Dawn almost never speak.

The songs they play are learnt from listening to the "wireless" and they drive to their concerts in a 1958 Morris Major car. Sometimes the songs are incomplete thanks to an interruption in their reception and the sisters, lacking any normal cultural context, often seem not to fully understand what they are singing about.

One of their neighbours has a computer and has made their official website for them.

== Side projects and collaborations ==
Annie Lee and Christine Johnston had separate roles in a comedy, cabaret presentation, Women in Voice (WIV), in September 2007 at Brisbane's Playhouse theatre. Lee was the MC, who according to Erin White of Australian Stage, "captures the audience with her expressive face and amazing large, bright eyes. Her intermittent songs about dreams and the vastness of the universe, evidently project the WIV desire for women (and men) to follow their dreams and make their own destiny." White observed that Johnston "performs dressed as an old school teacher; sings the Latin word for Tomato; and breaks out to 'What I Like About You', before performing her signature act – playing the musical saw. The haunting and ringing sound of the saw complements [her] obscure persona. Her performance is stilted and disjointed, yet suits the character she is playing."

In June 2013 ,Johnston and two assistants, Peter Nelson and Lisa O'Neill, performed in a side project, RRamp – the Collector, the Archivist & the Electrocrat, at the Adelaide Cabaret Festival. Mick Searles of AussieTheatre.com described the show, "Johnston sings skewed stories about chickens, tax receipts, scabs, kitchen utensils and her love of collecting and keeping things in jars (including skin from a suntan in 1978) in a wacky musical comedy." From 2002 the trio of Johnston, Nelson and O'Neill have worked as the Gingham Family to perform a children's musical comedy, Fluff: A Story of Lost Toys.

Johnston appeared as The Old Woman in Opera Queensland's (OQ) 2015 staged production of Leonard Bernstein's operetta Candide, directed by Lindy Hume. In 2017, Johnston played Mad Margaret in OQ's production of Gilbert and Sullivan's Ruddigore.

Annie Lee performed a solo set of shows, Barefoot Cabaret, in June 2015 providing "a night of gorgeous European cabaret with classics by everyone from Kurt Weill to Bertolt Brecht". In another of Lee's cabaret shows, Lighthouse Berlin, she performs a personal tribute to the life of cabaret legend and friend Agnes Bernelle (1923–1999). In July 2015, Jack Beeby of Aussie Theatre writes "this beautifully fond and personal tribute to one of the last direct links to Weimar Germany… Lee recounts the details of Bernelle’s extraordinary life".

The Kransky Sisters collaborated with a five-piece classical music ensemble, Topology, in January 2016 to present a combined show which "sees the assembled performers take on scores and songs, including well-known themes from Star Trek, Harry Potter and Downton Abbey."

== Members ==
- Annie Lee (Mourne Kransky): vocals, acoustic guitar, reed keyboard, biscuit tin, kitchen pot, tambourine
- Christine Johnston (Eve Kransky): vocals, musical-saw, reed keyboard, toilet brush, tambourine
- Michele Watt (Arva Kransky): tuba, vocals (former member)
- Carolyn Johns (Dawn Kransky): tuba, vocals

== Awards and nominations ==
- The Age Critics' Award – Melbourne International Comedy Festival 2004
- Melbourne Airports Best Newcomers Award – Melbourne International Comedy Festival 2004
- Green Room Award – Best Cabaret Ensemble 2004 (awarded in 2005)
- Herald Angel Award for Excellence – 2006 Edinburgh Festival Fringe
- Sydney Theatre Awards – Best Cabaret Production 2008

=== Mo Awards ===
The Australian Entertainment Mo Awards (commonly known informally as the Mo Awards), were annual Australian entertainment industry awards. They recognised achievements in live entertainment in Australia from 1975 to 2016.

Year	Nominee / work	Award	Result (wins only)
2004	The Kransky Sisters	Comedy Group of the Year	Won

== Discography ==
=== Albums ===
Title	Details
A Keepsake of Live Excerpts from Mourne, Eve and Arva	Released: 2005; Label: The Kransky Sisters
