= Georgia Mooney =

- Born: 27 October 1988 (age 38)
- Occupation: Musician
- Instruments: Vocals, guitar
- Years active: 2012–present
- Label: Nettwerk
- Website: www.georgiamooney.com

Georgia Mooney is an Australian singer, songwriter and multi-instrumentalist and member of the ARIA award–winning folk quartet All Our Exes Live in Texas. Mooney released her debut extended play in 2012. Her debut solo album, Full of Moon, was released in August 2023.

Mooney has hosted the APRA Awards, frequently guest hosted Double J and contributed vocals with Passenger, Tim Minchin and Kesha.

== Career ==
=== 2012–present ===
In 2012 Mooney released her debut EP Another Year On.

In 2014, Mooney formed the folk group All Our Exes Live in Texas alongside fellow singer-songwriters Elana Stone, Hannah Crofts and Katie Wighton. The group has gone on to tour nationally, and win the ARIA Award for Best Blues and Roots Album in 2017.

In 2019, Mooney launched Supergroup at Sydney's Giant Dwarf. Supergroup is describing by Mooney as "half chatting and half music" with each show featuring Mooney and three guest musicians talking and taking turns playing songs from their respective catalogues. Mooney said "That concept of having four artists onstage sitting in a circle … it's a very folky traditional thing. It's a lovely way of sharing music. And I wanted to take that and elaborate on it a bit and see what would happen if there were people from really different genres, so that's where the Supergroup thing comes in." Guests included Tim Rogers, Montaigne, Lisa Mitchell, Urthboy and Murray Cook.

In April 2022, Mooney confirmed Supergroup was relaunching and touring outside of Sydney for the first time.

In May 2023, Mooney announced the forthcoming release of her debut studio album Full of Moon, preceded by the singles "War Romance", "I Am Not in a Hurry", "Break It Off", "Soothe You" and "Nothing Is Forever"

== Discography ==
=== Studio albums ===
List of albums, with selected details
Title	Details
Full of Moon	Scheduled: 25 August 2023; Label: Nettwerk; Format: CD, LP, digital download

=== Extended plays ===
List of EPs, with selected details
Title	Details
Another Year On	released: 2012; Label: Format:

== Awards and nominations ==
=== AIR Awards ===
The Australian Independent Record Awards (commonly known informally as AIR Awards) is an annual awards night to recognise, promote and celebrate the success of Australia's Independent Music sector.

Year	Nominee / work	Award	Result	Ref.
2024	Full of Moon	Best Independent Blues and Roots Album or EP	Nominated	
2024	Independent Music Video of the Year	Tobias Willis for Georgia Mooney – "War Romance"	Nominated	

=== APRA Awards ===
The APRA Awards are presented annually from 1982 by the Australasian Performing Right Association (APRA), "honouring composers and songwriters".

Year	Nominee / work	Award	Result	Ref.
2018	"Cadillac" (Katherine Wighton, Hannah Crofts, Georgia Mooney, Elana Stone)	Song of the Year	Shortlisted	

=== ARIA Music Awards ===
The ARIA Music Awards are a set of annual ceremonies presented by Australian Recording Industry Association (ARIA), which recognise excellence, innovation, and achievement across all genres of the music of Australia. They commenced in 1987.

Year	Nominee / work	Award	Result	Ref.
2024	Full of Moon	Best Blues and Roots Album	Nominated	

== See also ==
- All Our Exes Live in Texas
