= Enmore Theatre =

Theatre in Sydney, Australia

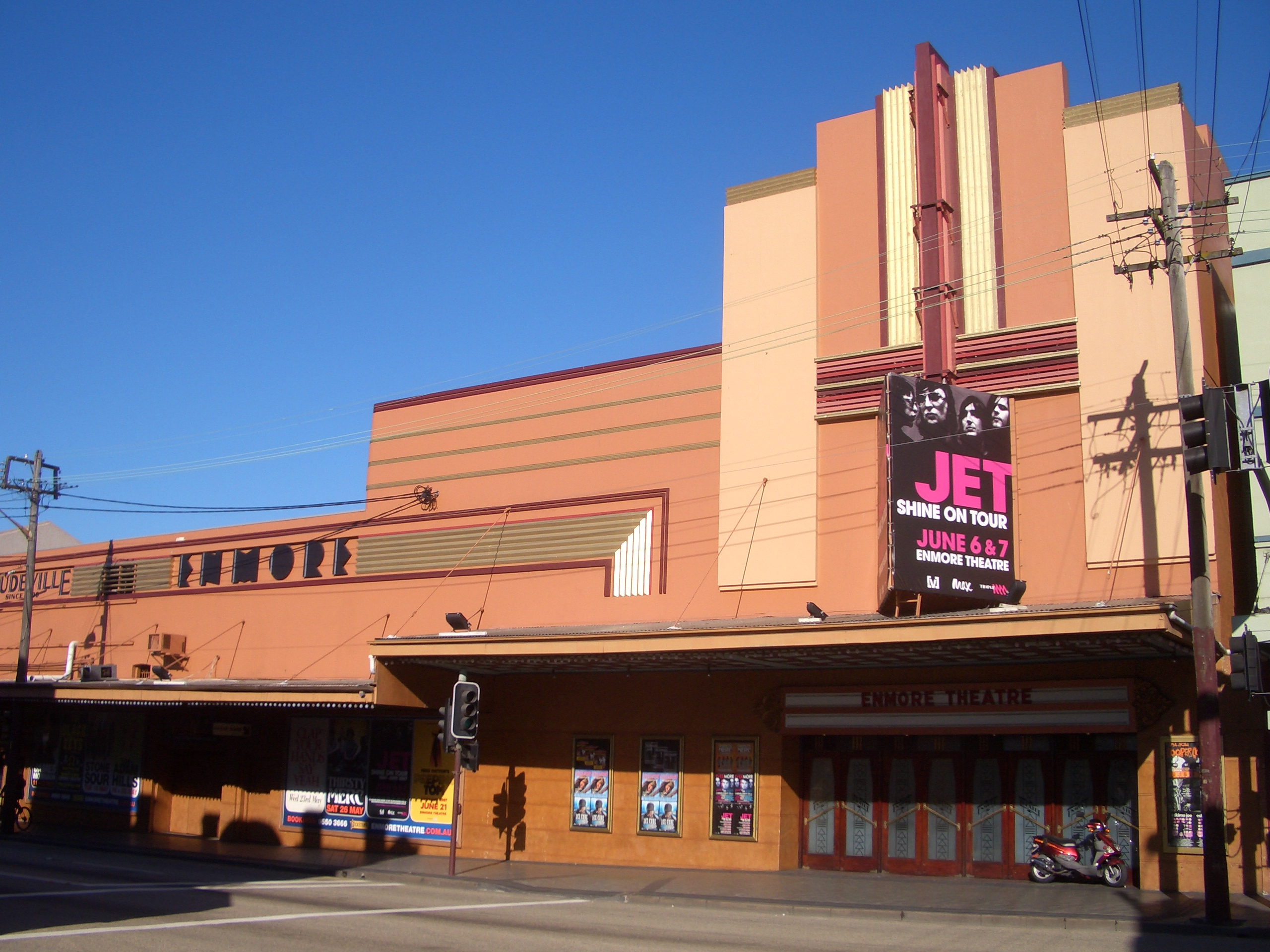
- Facade of the Enmore Theatre, 2007
- Interactive map of the Enmore Theatre area

General information
- Architectural style: Inter-war Art Deco
- Location: Sydney, Australia, 118–132 Enmore Road, Newtown, Sydney, Australia
- Coordinates: 33°53′56″S 151°10′26″E
- Opened: 1908
- Renovated: 1920; 1937
- Cost: £24,000 (1920); $2 million (1991)
- Owner: Century Venues
- Operator: Century Venues

Design and construction
- Architect: Kaberry & Chard (1920)

Renovating team
- Architects: Charles Bohringer & Associates (1937)
- Main contractor: J. Marron; T. Franklin & Sons (Auditorium)

Other information
- Seating capacity: 2,500 standing, 1,700 seated

Website
- Venue Website

New South Wales Heritage Database (Local Government Register)
- Official name: Enmore Theatre, including interiors
- Type: Local heritage (built)
- Designated: 12 December 2011
- Part of: Inner West Local Environmental Plan 2022
- Reference no.: I1320

The Enmore Theatre is a theatre and entertainment venue in Enmore, New South Wales, Australia.

It was built in 1908. It is located at 118–132 Enmore Road in Newtown, in the inner west of Sydney's suburbs. It was first opened in 1912 as a photo-play theatre. It was run by a well-known theatre family at the time, the Szarka Brothers.

Today's Enmore Theatre is the longest running live theatre in Sydney, hosting concerts, comedians, plays and all forms of performance. The theatre is considered a medium-sized venue that holds 1,700 people when fully seated and 2,500 when seats are removed, and all attendees are standing. It has hosted many international bands including a performance by Bob Dylan.

The venue's Inter-war Art Deco style, dating from its 1937 remodelling by Charles Bohringer, is protected by its listing as a local heritage item by Inner West Council. The Enmore theatre has had many renovations and shifts of ownership. Today it is owned by Century Venues and has hosted a range of arts from photographic, performing arts, music and motion picture.

The theatre's listing in the Office of Environment and Heritage states that the building "illustrates the development of suburban theatres in the late 1930s and early 1940s and is of social significance for the local community.″ It is the only theatre in Sydney from the Art Deco movement in its original condition. From cinema use to concerts, today it is used for various reasons.

== History ==
Opened in 1912, the theatre was first used as a photo-play theatre that screened silent movies, this was accompanied by a concert orchestra. Patrons could attend silent movies for between three and six pennies.

The venue was run by brothers William and George Szarka. William Szarka, also known as Bill, was an elected member of the local council from 1914 to 1928. He crowned himself "King of Newtown" on stage at the Enmore theatre in the style of a pageant, complete with pageboys and regal robes. He was also a boxing promoter and businessman. Together the brothers also ran the Olympia Stadium in nearby Marrickville.

The two brothers rejuvenated the cinema. In 1920, the pair extensively renovated the theatre, before it was opened by premier John Storey on 1 July in the same year. Theatre architects Kaberry and Chard carried out the renovations in the Inter-war Spanish Mission style. The Sydney Morning Herald reported the cost of this was 24,000 pounds. In 1920 it was reported that the bill would be changed twice a week on Mondays and Fridays.

In 1926, the Szarka brothers joined the Hoyts cinema chain. 1928 saw the arrival of talking pictures which created a massive surge in cinema attendance. Hoyts cinema chain purchased the venue from the Szarka brothers in 1936. The brothers' company, Szarka Bros Ltd, was liquidated in 1936. In 1937, Hoyts Theatres Limited undertook an extensive construction programme across their suburban theatres, including the complete rebuilding of the Enmore Theatre. The theatre was expanded and completed redesigned in the Art Deco style by prominent theatre architect, Charles Bohringer & Associates, with J. Marron as the builder.

The cinema was closed in 1967 and was reopened in 1969, when it was purchased by the Louis Film Company. The family owned business, adapted and controlled the theatre privately, screening only Greek Films. The venue's name was changed to Finos Theatre. This was popular in an area where 13% of the Greek population lived. The 1980s saw a decline in use of theatres across Sydney, with many theatres closing down. The Australian Elizabethan Theatre Trust took control of the theatre and began renovations. Half a million dollars was spent restoring and extending the venue, once again allowing the venue to host live performances. Unlike other cinemas which were demolished due to the Sydney pro-development movement, the Enmore Theatre was reopened in 1985 with its original name. The Fink family became the sole owner of Hoyts in 1985 and expanded its operations into distribution and home entertainment. The experience of cinema was changing.

In 1991, the Showcall Pty ltd began running the theatre and exceeded $2 million in expenditure to redesign the venue and provide additional space. The popularity of the Enmore Theatre is closely linked with the contemporary development of Newtown as an arts and entertainment hub. The Federal Government in 1992 requested the Australian Broadcasting Authority to begin trials of community television. There was less demand for cinema, and more demand for live entertainment and performances within spaces like the Enmore Theatre.

On 3 March 2022, during a sold-out show by Genesis Owusu, the dance floor collapsed two songs into his set. The concert was halted and rescheduled. No one was injured and the venue confirmed the following day that the floor was repaired and all scheduled shows would still continue.

== Events ==
A list of some of the more famous musical acts that have performed at the Enmore Theatre

| Act Name | Genre | Country | Year Played |
|---|---|---|---|
| Amy Shark | Indie Pop | Australia | 2018 |
| Bob Dylan | American Folk & Rock | United States | 2018 |
| Buddy Guy | Blues | United States | 2023 |
| Coldplay | Alternative Rock | United Kingdom | 2001 2014 |
| The Cranberries | Alternative Rock | Ireland | 2012 |
| DMA's | Indie Rock | Australia | 2018 |
| Dizzie Rascal | British Hip Hop | United Kingdom | 2018 |
| Europe | Hard Rock | Sweden | 2018 |
| Gang of Youths | Alternative Rock | Australia | 2018 |
| Hunters and Collectors | Pub Rock | Australia | 2014 |
| Icehouse | Rock and New Wave | Australia | 2017 |
| Kevin Morby | Indie and Folk Rock | United States | 2020 |
| Kiss | Hard Rock | United States | 2004 |
| London Grammar | Indie Pop and Electronica | United Kingdom | 2015 |
| Lily Allen | Electropop Contemporary R&B | United Kingdom | 2019 |
| Mark Knopfler | Pop Rock Film | United Kingdom | 2005 |
| Missy Higgins | Acoustic music and Independent Music | Australia | 2014 |
| Nick Cave | Alternative and Experimental rock | Australia | 2013 |
| Noel Gallagher's High Flying Birds | Rock and Britpop | United Kingdom | 2012 |
| Pete Murray | Folk Music | Australia | 2017 |
| Polyphia | Progressive rock | United States | 2023* |
| Sonic Youth | Alternative Rock | United States | 2008 |
| The Ramones | Punk Rock | United States | 1989 |
| Rory Gallagher | Blues Rock | Ireland | 1991 |
| The Script | Pop rock | Ireland | 2009 |
| The Rolling Stones | Rock and Roll | United Kingdom | 2003 |
| The Temper Trap | Indie Rock | Australia | 2013 |
| The Dandy Warhols | Alternative and Psychedelic rock | United States | 2008 2024 |
| The White Stripes | Garage Rock | United States | 2003 |
| TLC | Hip Hop and Contemporary R&B | United States | 2016 |
| Yothu Yindi & Treaty Project | Indigenous music of Australia | Australia | 2018 |
| Vance Joy | Indie Folk | Australia | 2018 |
| "Weird Al" Yankovic | Parody and Polka | United States | 2023 |

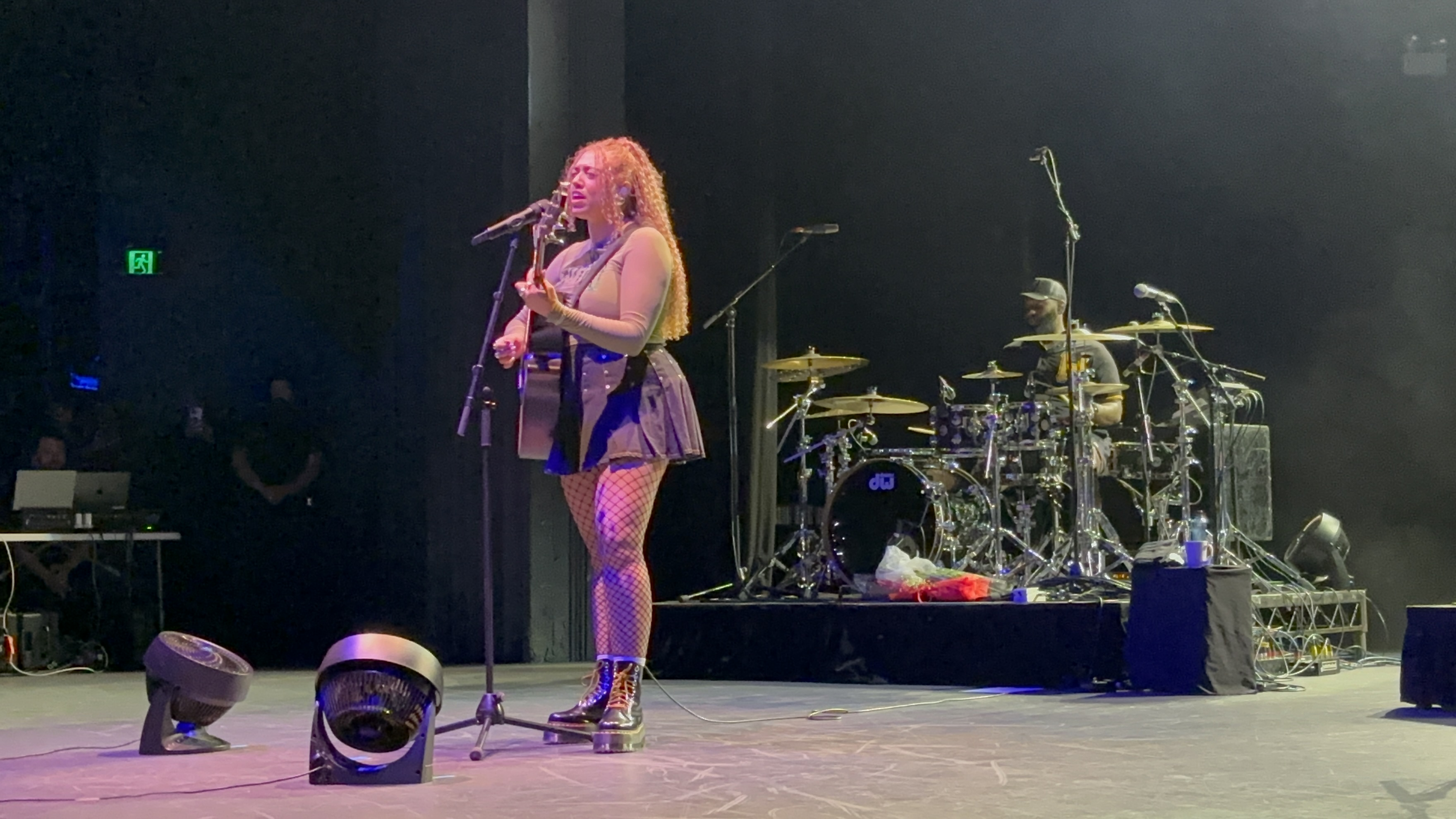
British R&B singer Mahalia performing at the Enmore Theatre in May 2024.

One of its earlier notable events is that the venue hosted several Miss Globe pageants during the 1950s and 1960s. Other performances and shows include Rockwiz, screening the 2018 FIFA World Cup, Comedy Festival 2016, Tuesday Comedy Club Nights, Mardi Gras Parties, Miss Pole Dance Australia, Wogs at Work, The Pink Floyd Experience, My Favourite Murder. Comedy performances include Tom Gleeson, Matt Okine, Kitty Flanagan, Miranda Sings, Daniel Tosh, Merrick and Rosso, Rove McManus and Lano and Woodley.The Enmore Theatre is also becoming known as a major space for children's entertainment featuring acts such as The Wiggles, Justine Clarke, The Fairies, & Lah-Lah.

Australian musician, Steve Balbi, describes the Enmore Theatre as having a "certain prestige...that's kind of a little bit like the Sydney Cricket Ground, not at an arena level but at a theatre level. It's beautiful, it's about music, it's about performance."

In 2020, due to the Global pandemic of COVID-19, and the forced temporary shut down of all venues in Australia, the Enmore Theatre had to cancel and reschedule many performances.

== Community use ==
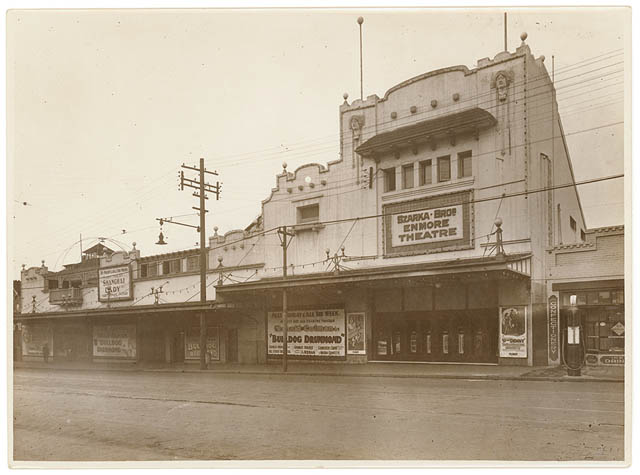
The Spanish Mission style Enmore Theatre (circa 1920), as designed by Kaberry and Chard.

The late 20th century saw the local community of Enmore and Newtown become more active in community activism and independent thinking. The Enmore Theatre is therefore not just used for performance purposes. It has previously and is today been used by the local community. In 2015, the local community attended a meeting that proposed the plans for the WestConnex development proposals The local community of the Marrickville, Enmore and Newtown suburbs strongly rejected the proposals actioned by the local and state government. The Enmore Theatre often also supports the local community through hosting local acts and performances. An example of this was in 2014 the Enmore Theatre hosted the event 'Rock the Gate.' This was to raise money in support of protecting farmlands from fracking as well as unconventional gas mining.

In terms of location, the closest train station is Newtown Station, the theatre is within 5 minutes walking distance. Parking is limited in the area. Patrons can, however, book a parking spot to ensure they will have a place to park their vehicle. There are many buses from the CBD to Newtown and Enmore. It is surrounded by cafes, restaurants and bars. There are public toilets on site at the Theatre and it is air conditioned. Inside the venue is three licensed bars. It has confectionary items, snacks, soft drinks and alcohol. There is a cloakroom that charges $3 per item. Condition of entry requires patrons to put large bags or backpacks in the cloakroom. Smoking within the venue is not permitted. For those who wish to collect or purchases tickets at the venue, the Box Office opens 2 hours prior to any performance.

== Architecture ==
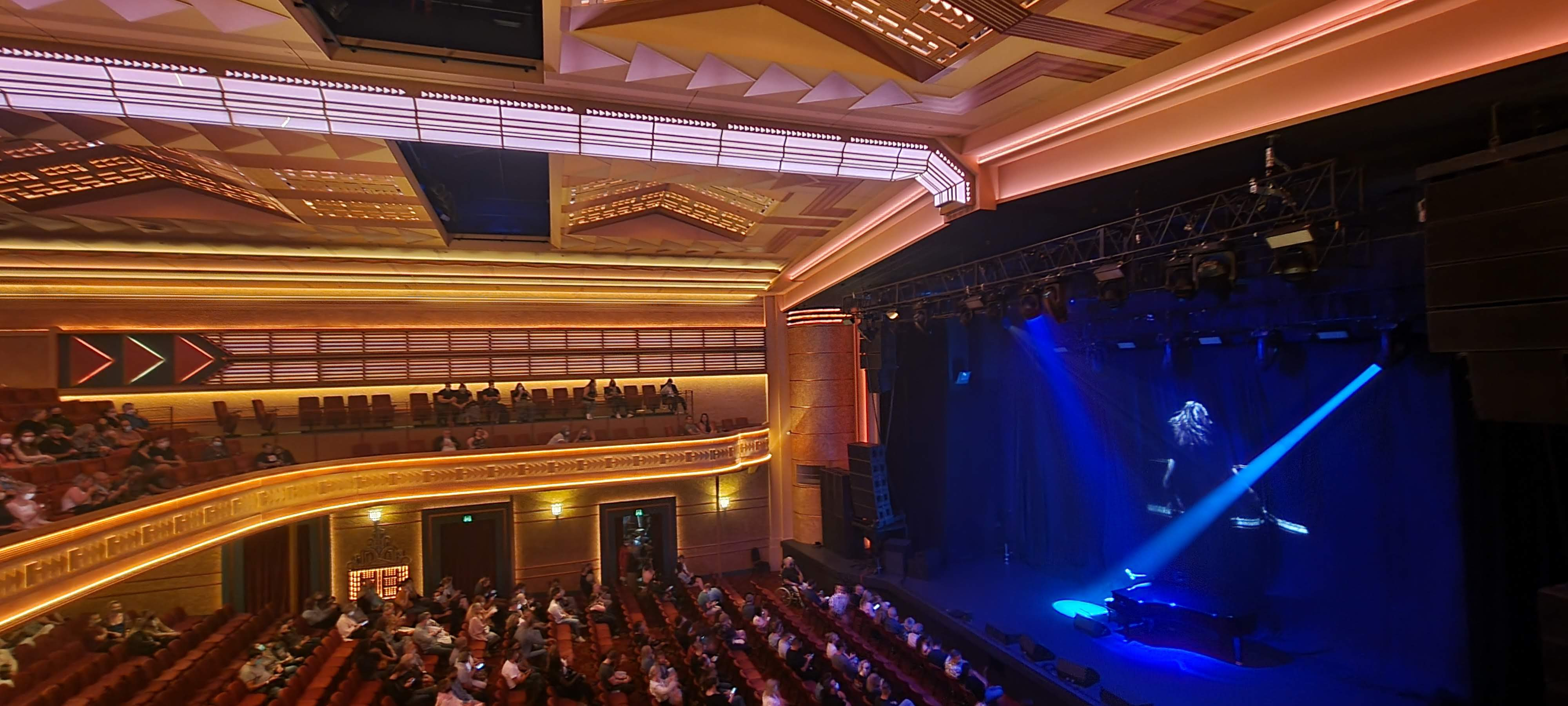
Interior view of the Enmore Theatre, January 2022

1920 Enmore Theatre was originally designed by architects, Kaberry & Chard, in the Spanish Mission Style. The Art Deco design of the Enmore Theatre is the work of prominent theatre architect, Charles Bohringer, who was responsible for the designs of a large number of theatres around Sydney.

The Enmore Theatre has been described as "Art Nouveau, Edwardian, Art Moderne and various Art Deco." It is predominantly modern, with aspects of late 19th century and early 20th century architecture. Tropman & Tropman architects completed the most recent heritage study review, acknowledging that the "building is of rendered masonry with a raised parapet and Art Deco motif above the wide, multi-lead doorway." The entrance has pressed metal lining and the doors are made of timber, with glass insertions and brass detailing. The most recent assessment of condition was done in 2001, the local government recorded that the building appeared to be in reasonable condition, with some cracking within the paintwork. The building is classified by the national trust and is registered in the historic buildings of the Australian Institute of Architects.

== Gallery ==
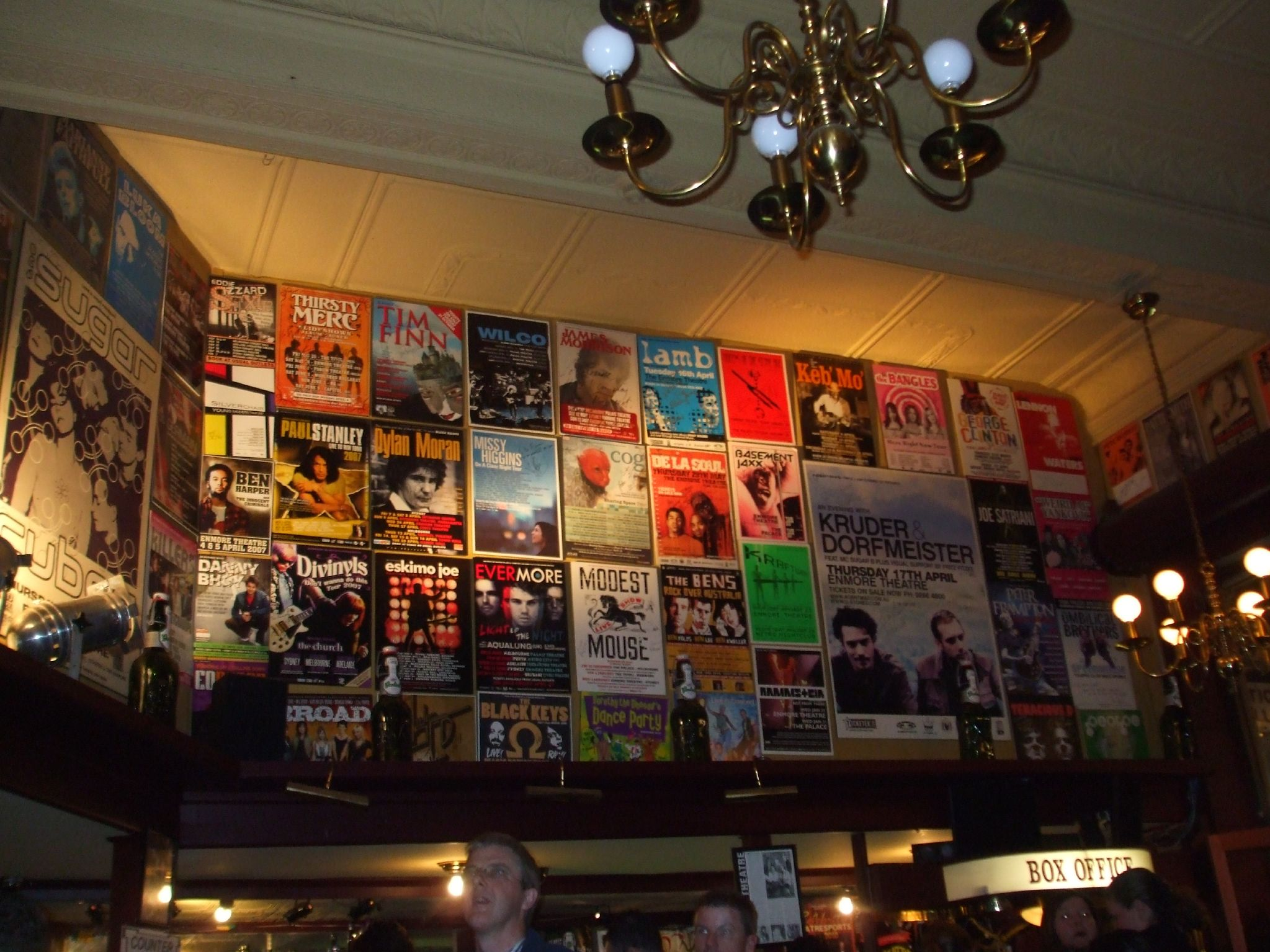
Enmore Theatre Poster Decor

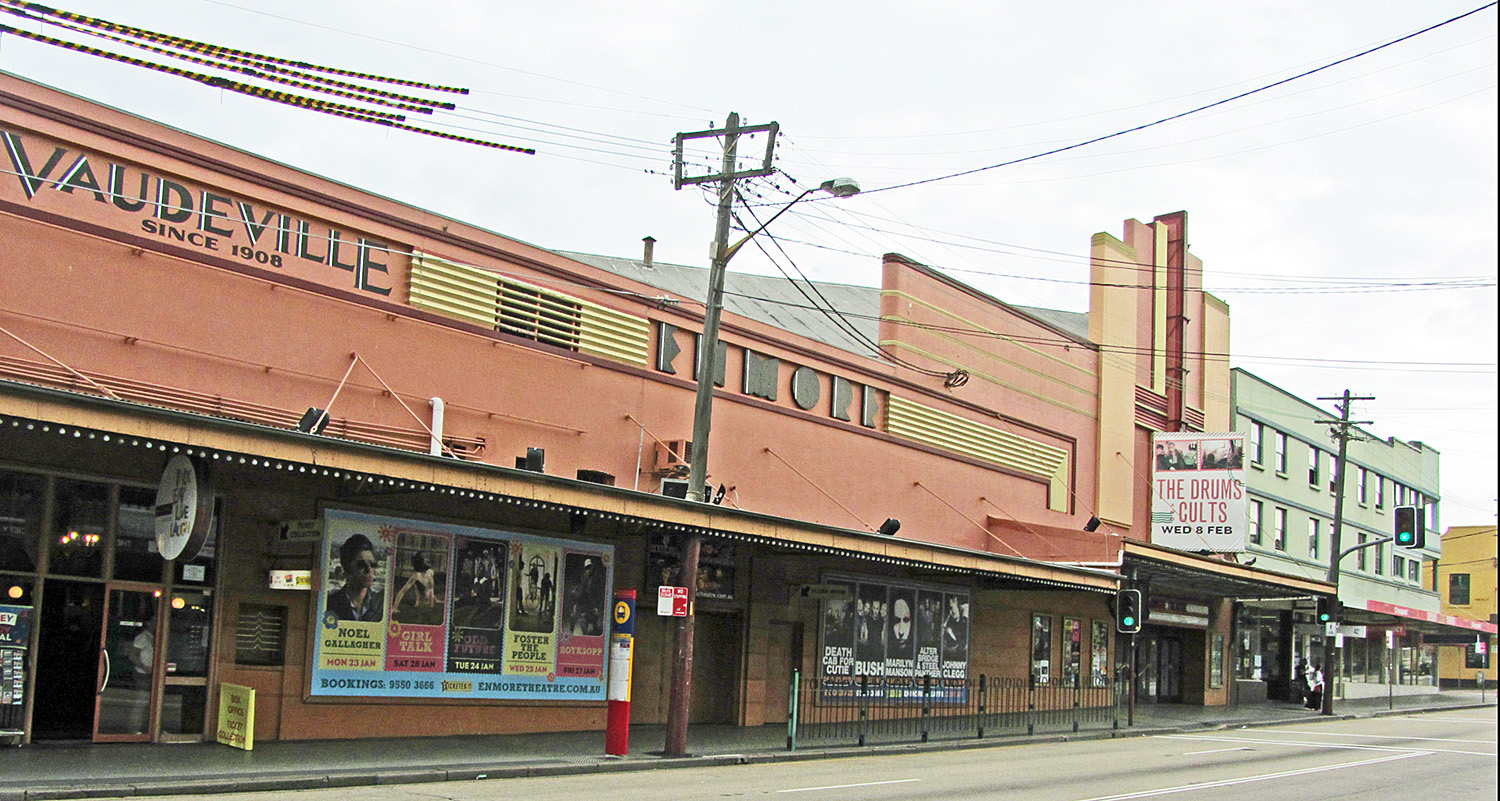
Enmore Road

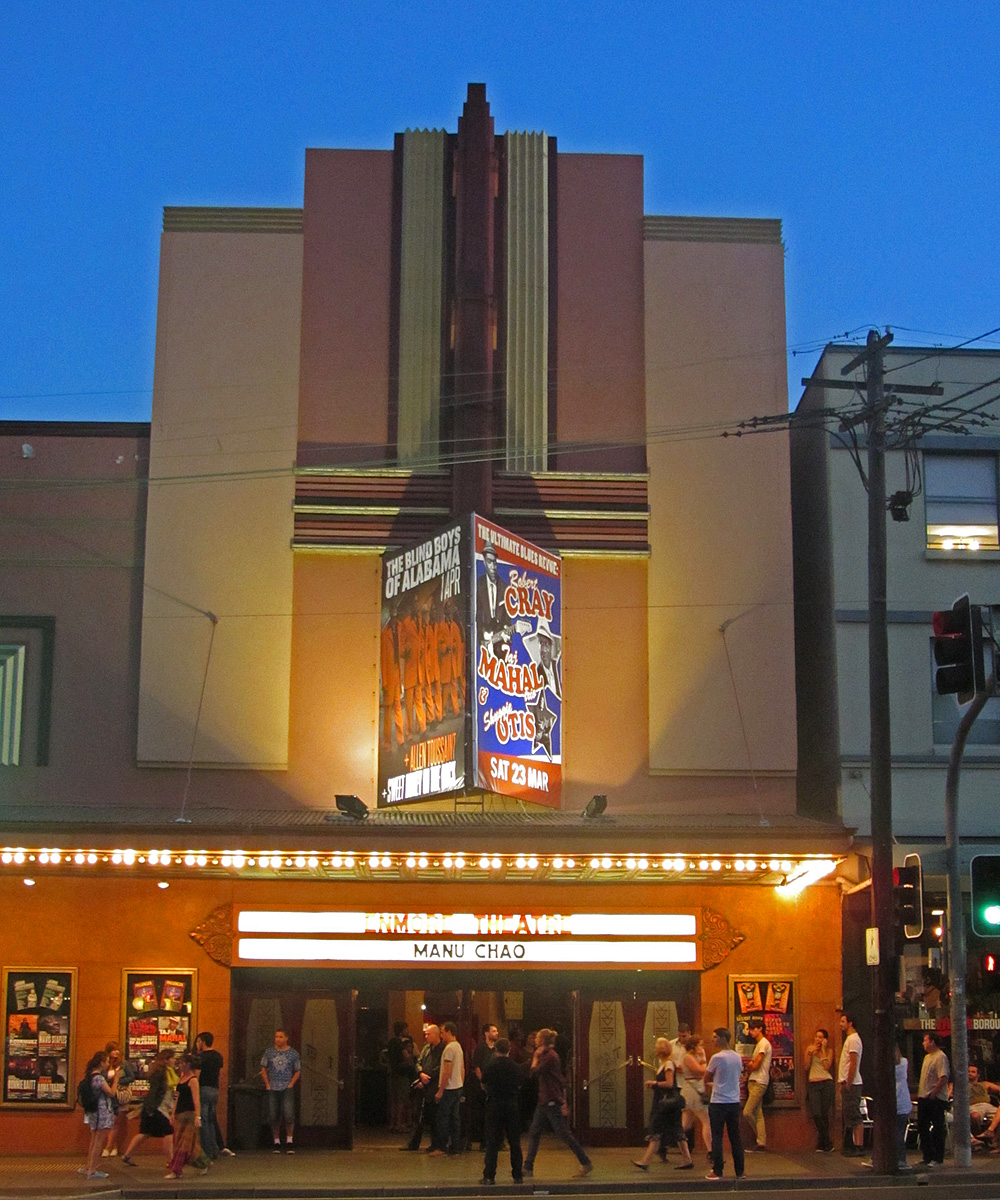
Enmore Theatre at night

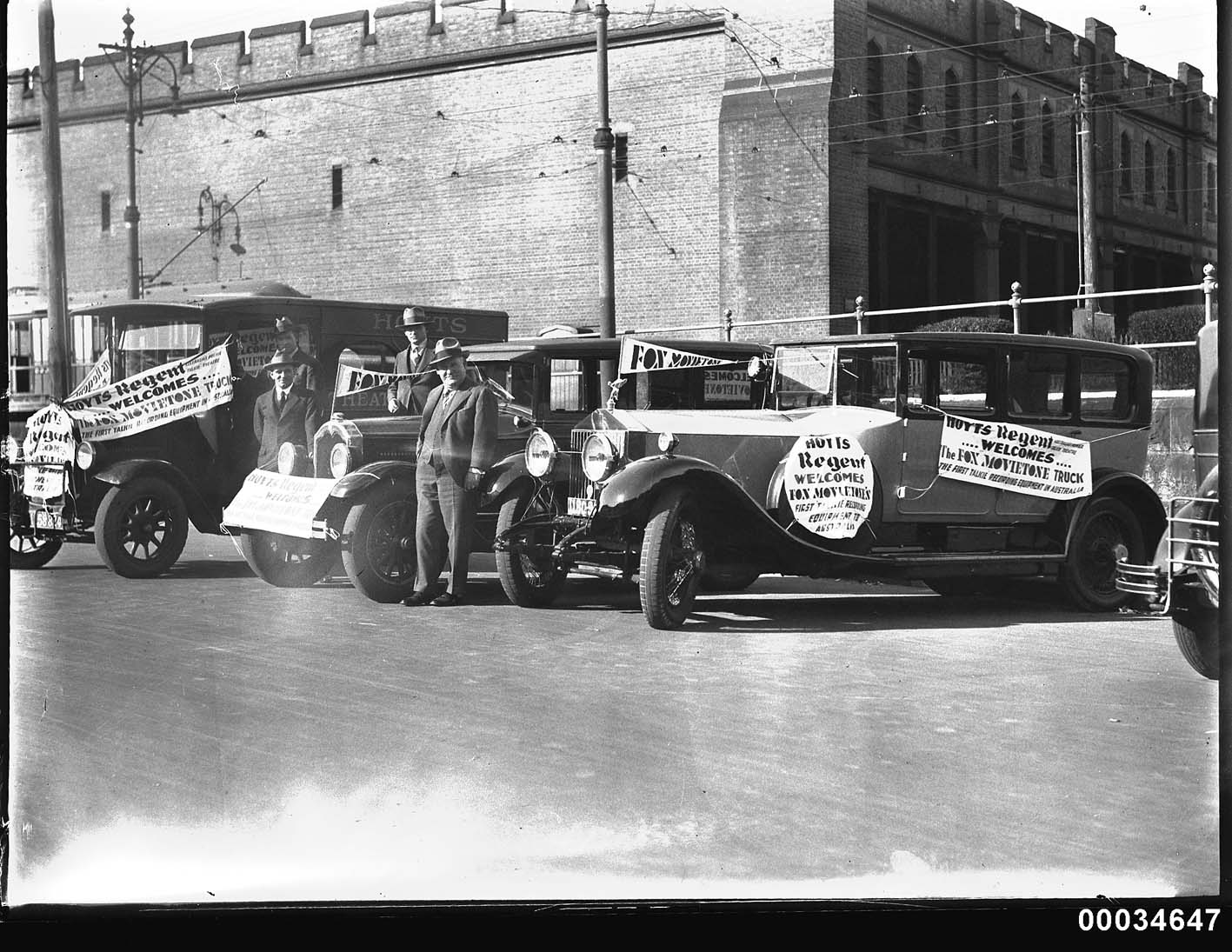
Then owner, William Szarka, in August 1929 in front of his Rolls-Royce at a Movietone event.

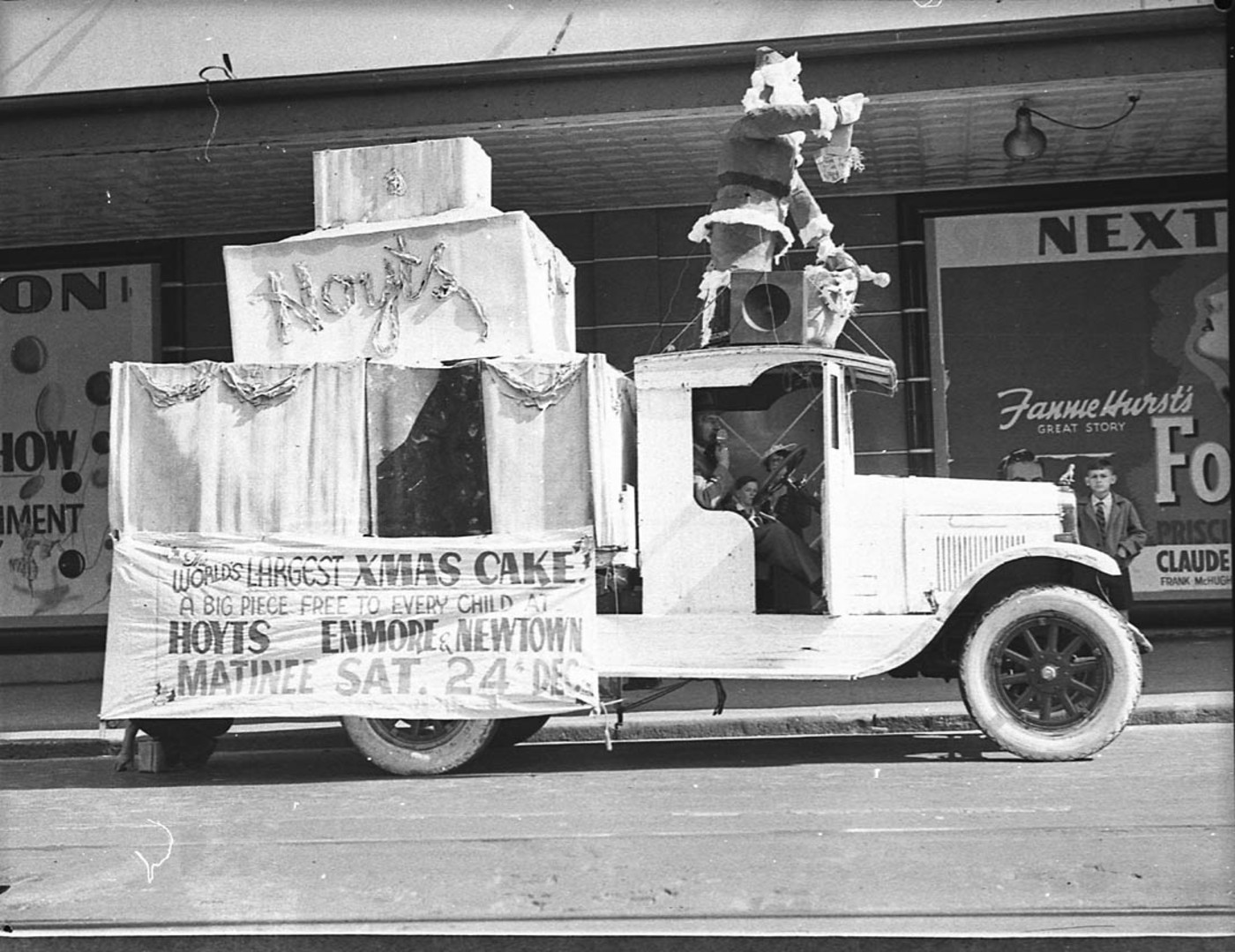
On the 24th of December 1938, the Enmore Theatre gave free cake to all children who attended the Saturday matinee.

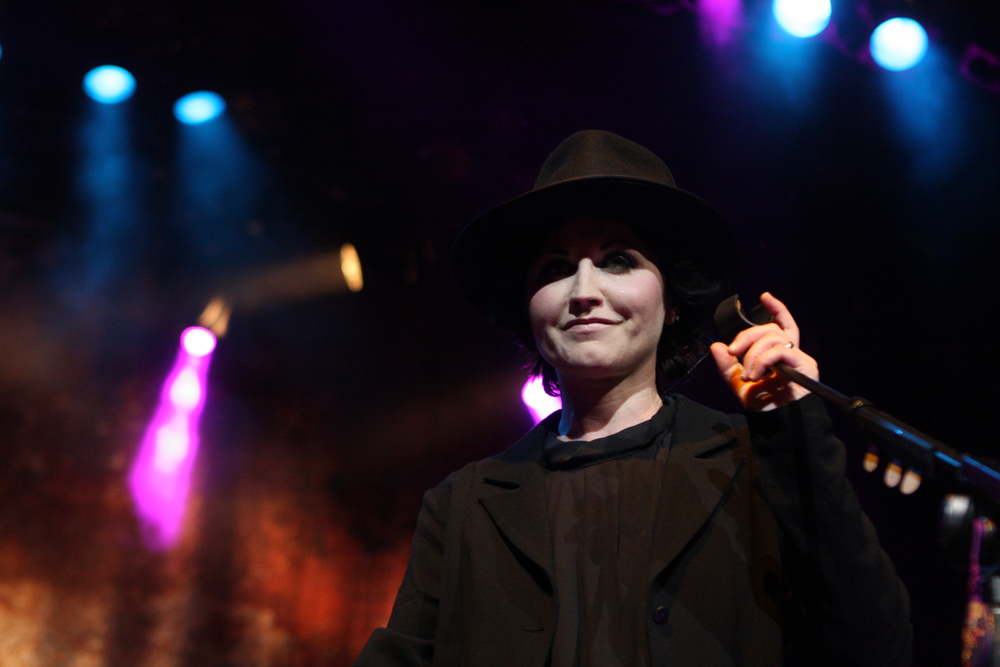
The Cranberries, Live at the Enmore Theatre in 2012.

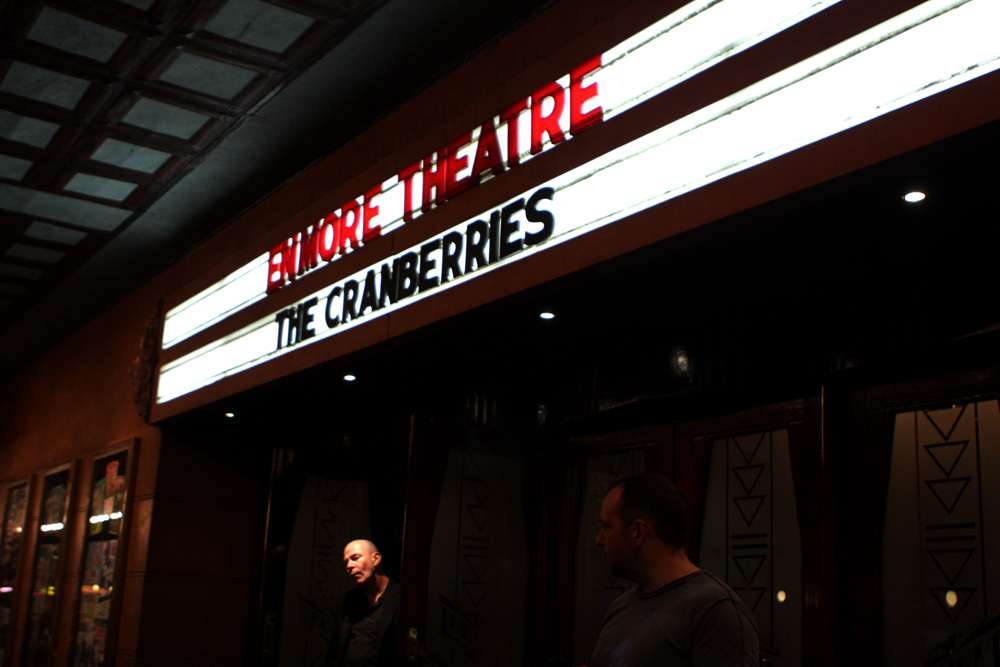
Entrance to the Enmore Theatre on the evening of the Performance by The Cranberries.

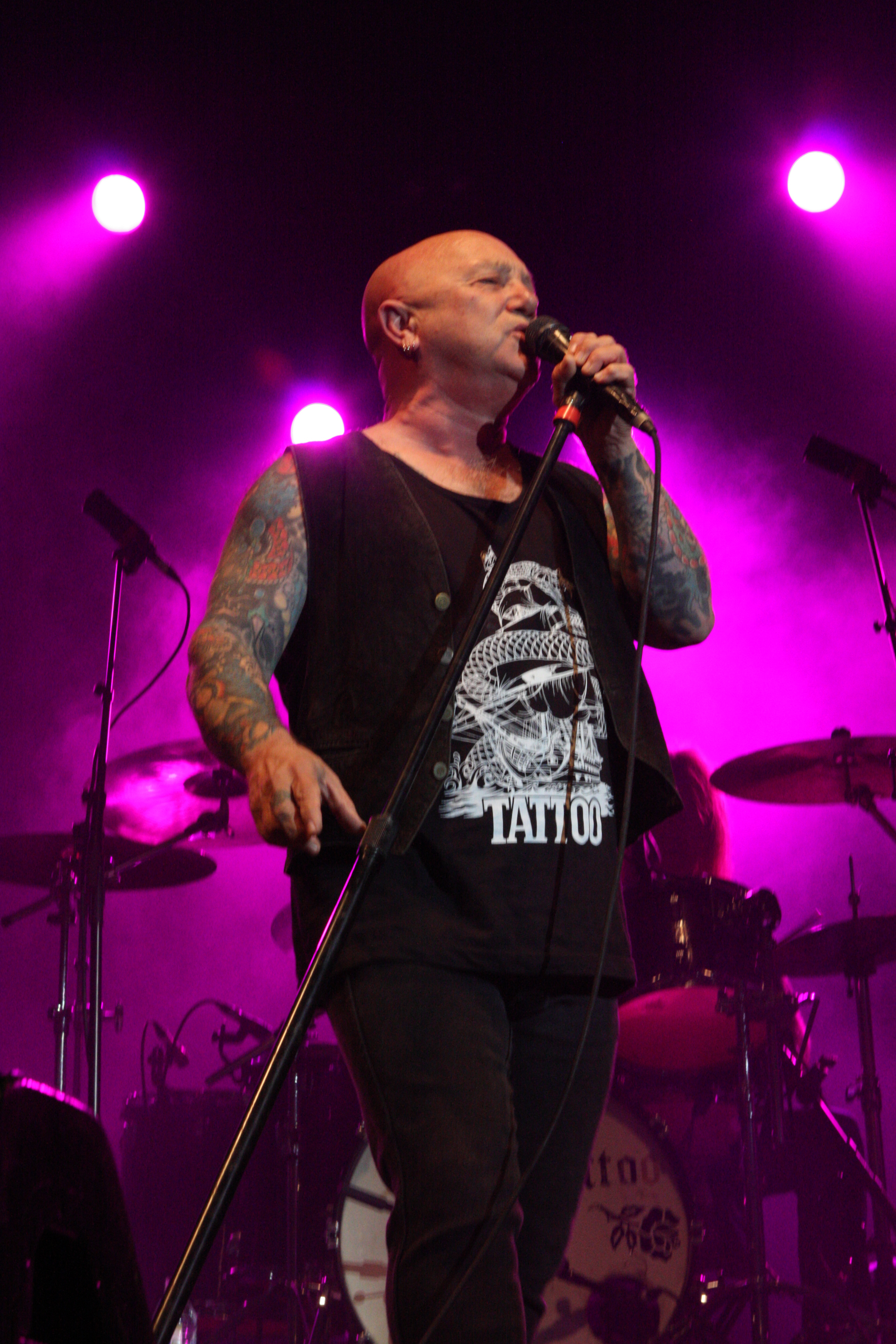
Rose Tattoo at the Enmore Theatre in 2011.
