= Brian Campeau =

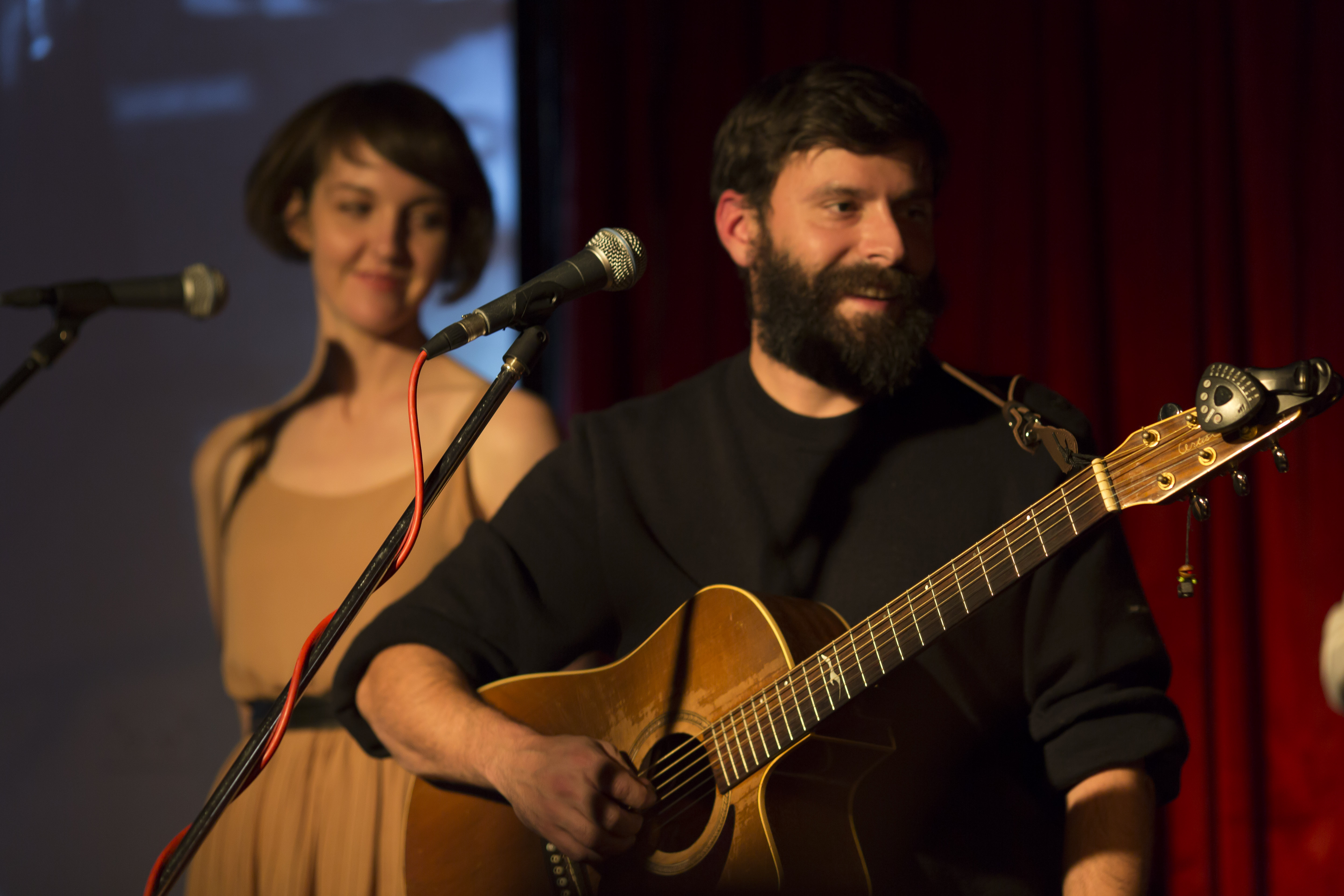
- Elana Stone, Campeau; May 10, 2015

Background information
- Born: 1980 (age 45–46); Ottawa, Ontario, Canada
- Genres: Folk; world; dance; electronica
- Occupations: Musician, producer
- Instruments: Guitar, vocals
- Years active: 2004–present
- Label: Art As Catharsis
- Website: brian-campeau.bandcamp.com

Brian Campeau (born 1980) is a Canadian multi-instrumental musician and producer, based in Australia since 2002. He has released six solo studio albums Brian Campeau and the Solitary Game (2004), Two Faces (2006), Mostly Winter Sometimes Spring (2009), Don't Overthink It, Overthink, Overthinking (2015), Old Dog, New Tricks (2018) and Ambient Driver (2020). He is also a member of bluegrass band, Green Mohair Suits.

== Early life ==
Brian Campeau is originally from Ottawa, Canada. He graduated from Guelph University in 1999. He moved to Sydney, Australia in 2002. He later relocated to Melbourne.

== Career ==
Since 2002 Brian Campeau has released six studio albums as a solo artist. He has also collaborated with other artists: Elana Stone, Melanie Horsnell, Passenger, All Our Exes Live in Texas, Hinterlandt and Clio Renner. He released a solo double-album, Two Faces in mid-2006. The Sydney Morning Herald's Bernard Zuel determined, he is "interested in both electronic and folk music... one disc placing a greater emphasis on a song-based approach; the other exploring their electronic possibilities." Zuel notes that Campeau is a former jazz and punk musician.

Also in 2006 Campeau formed a bluegrass band, Green Mohair Suits, in Sydney with Richie Cuthbert (Cuthbert & the Nightwalkers), Jason Mannell and Ben Romalis as a tribute to Gram Parsons. By 2010 they were joined by Mikey Floyd and Elana Stone. The group have issued four studio albums, Sing Songs from the Heathen Hymnbook (2009), Green (2012), Wooden Duck (2014) and Evans St (2016). theMusic.com.au's Chris Familton provided a review of the six-piece's performance in July 2015, showcasing "quiet, lilting songs or the brisk, brittle bluegrass workouts."

For his next solo album, Mostly Winter, Sometimes Spring (August 2009), Campeau used a different instrument for each of 15 tracks and produced the recording himself. theDwarf.com.au' Daniel Townsend found it an "intriguing concept" but "doesn't make for much of an album" with "no real radio-friendly moments". Zuel rated it at 3 out-of 5. Micheal Dwyer of The Age called it an "extraordinary second album".

Old Dog, New Tricks was issued in August 2018 via Art As Catharsis. Hamza Siddiqi of Overdrive Music Magazine approved of Campeau's "positive vibes and psychedelia" as "Each pleasingly mid-pace song throws hook after hook at you from every direction." MediaSearch's Carmine Pascuzzi described Campeau as "an established and highly regarded musician and an essential staple of the Sydney music scene."

His song "Montreal" was used in NAB's 'More Give, Less Take' advertisement campaign.

== Discography ==
=== Studio albums ===
solo

- Brian Campeau and the Solitary Game (Independent – 2004)
- Two Faces (2006) Vitamin Music
- Mostly Winter Sometimes Spring (2009) Inertia Music
- Don't Overthink It, Overthink, Overthinking (Art As Catharsis – 2015)
- Old Dog, New Tricks (August 2018) Small Pond/Art As Catharsis
- Ambient Driver (Art As Catharsis - 2020)

Green Mohair Suits

- Sing Songs from the Heathen Hymnbook (Independent – 2009)
- Green – The Green Album" (Independent – 2012)
- Wooden Duck (Independent - 2014)
- Evans St (independent - 2016)
