= Marcello Maio =

Australian jazz pianist and composer

Marcello Maio is an Australian jazz pianist and composer. A student at Sydney Conservatorium of Music from 2003, Maio was the accordion player on the television variety show In Siberia Tonight (2005–2006), during which he communicated with the host through his instrument. He is keyboardist in the jazz band SEXION, a member of gypsy-jazz fusion band, Monsieur Camembert, and experimental tango band, The Tango Saloon. He won the National Accordion Championships for three years (2001–2003) in both pop/jazz and solo performance sections.

== Early years ==
Marcello Maio attended St Mary's Cathedral College and became proficient in piano and piano accordion before becoming a student at Sydney Conservatorium of Music studying jazz from 2003.
