= Making Music Lah-Lah's Way =

Studio album by Lah-Lah
- Released: June 2011
- Recorded: March 2011
- Genre: Children's
- Length: 45:00
- Producer: Lah-Lah Productions

Lah-Lah chronology
Lah-Lah's Big Live Band (2009)	Making Music Lah-Lah's Way (2011)

Making Music Lah-Lah's Way is the second album from Australian children's band Lah-Lah. It was released independently coinciding with Lah-Lah's live season at the Sydney Opera House Concert Hall in Sydney in June 2011.

== Track listing ==
1. "Boom Chaka Baby" (M & T Harris)
2. "Making Music Lah-Lah's Way" (M & T Harris)
3. "Hey Hey Everybody" (M & T Harris)
4. "Choo Choo Kettle" (M & T Harris)
5. "When Buzz Gets Up In The Morning" (M & T Harris)
6. "Tinkering" (M & T Harris)
7. "Music Makes Me Feel So Good" (M & T Harris)
8. "Brand New Day" (M & T Harris)
9. "Woody The Woodwind" (M & T Harris)
10. "Cinderella Samba" (M & T Harris)
11. "I Like To Wash My Hands" (M & T Harris)
12. "Buzz Writing Song" (M & T Harris)
13. "Big Bold and Brassy" (M & T Harris)
14. "Rain Go Away" (M & T Harris)
15. "Little Bee Lullaby" (M & T Harris)
16. "Dancing Doll" (M & T Harris)
17. "We're a Family" (M & T Harris)
18. "Look Out Backyard Here I Come" (M & T Harris)
19. "Pack Away" (M & T Harris)
20. "Goodbye" (M & T Harris)

== Personnel ==
1. Tina Harris (Lah-Lah) - vocals
2. Mark Harris (Buzz) - vocals/double bass
3. Nic Cecire (Tom Tom) - drums/percussion
4. Gary Daley (Squeezy Sneezy) - accordion/piano/keyboards
5. Matt Ottignon (Mister Saxophone) - tenor sax/soprano sax/clarinet/flute
6. Simon Sweeney (special guest) - trumpet
7. Anthony Kable (special guest) - trombone
8. Lilian Harris (special guest) - vocals
