= Keyna Wilkins =

Australian/British composer-musician

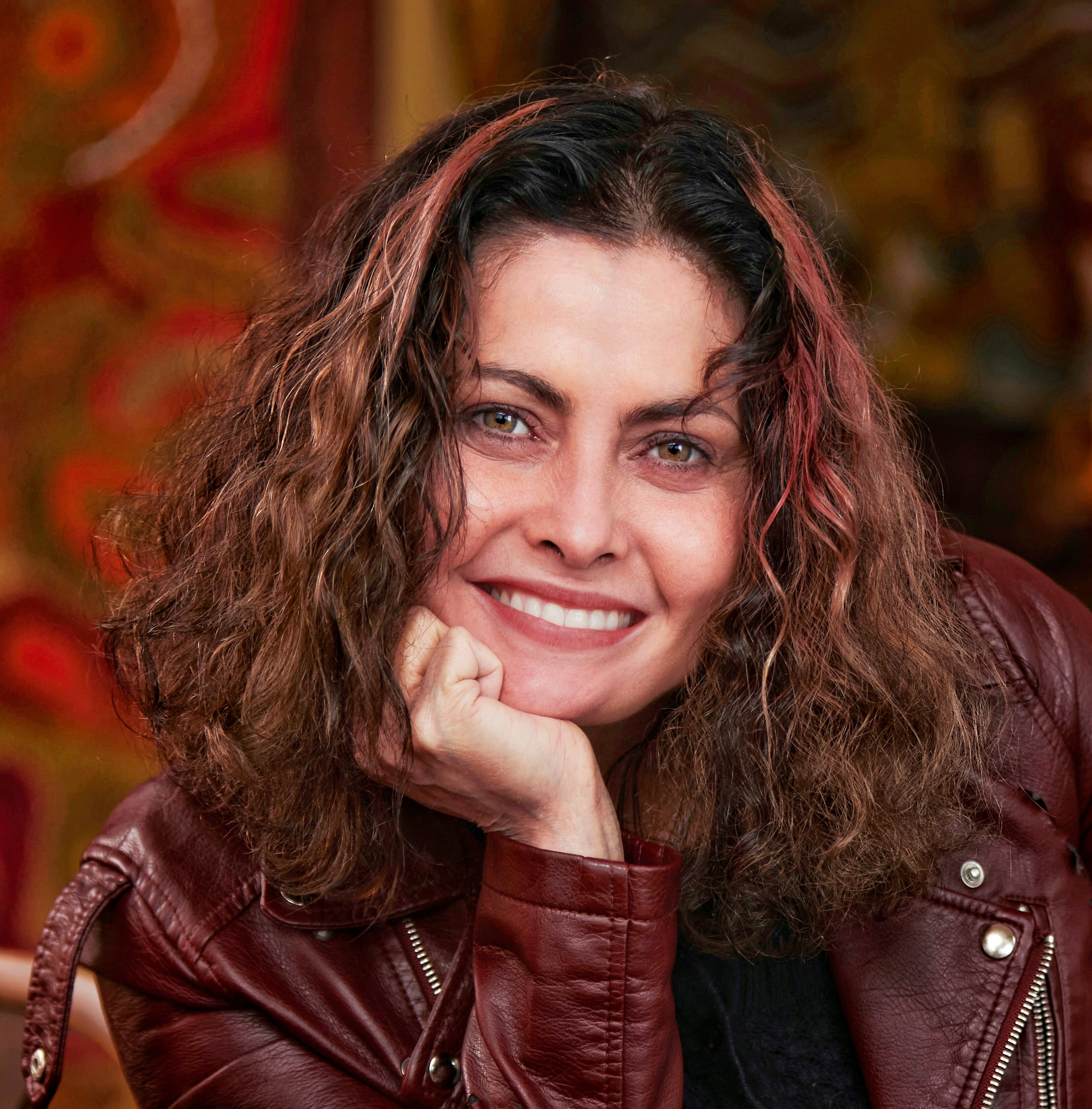
Keyna Wilkins in 2021

Keyna Wilkins is an Australian/British composer-musician. Her compositions are published and distributed by Wiripang Music.

Wilkins was a finalist in the Australian Music Centre and APRA AMCOS 2021 Art Music Awards in the category Award for Excellence in Experimental Music, for "recording and developing new projects in 2020". She was also a finalist in the 2018 Art Music Awards, in the category Award for Excellence by an Individual, for her "activities in original art music throughout 2017 as a composer-musician including releasing three original albums".

Wilkins is passionate about supporting refugees being detained in Immigration Detention. In 2021 she collaborated with visual artist and poet Jalal Mahamede, who is currently being held in Brisbane's immigration detention centre. They have released an album, featuring original music by Wilkins and poetry by Mahamede.

== Education ==
Wilkins holds a Master of Music Composition from the Sydney Conservatorium of Music. Her thesis is titled Astronomical Phenomena in Music Composition and explores "the astronomical phenomena in music composition".

Prior to moving to Australia, Wilkins studied at Bristol University (UK) where is obtained a MA Flute Performance (2008) and BA Mus (2003).

== Composer ==
Wilkins has written over 60 art music compositions are published/distributed by Wirripang Music and five tunes in the Australian Jazz Real Book.

Her music has been featured as part of the ABC Ausmusic month. She has also been included on Making Waves.

Wilkins is an Associate Artist represented by the Australian Music Centre.

Wilkins' compositions have been commissioned and/or performed by artists and ensembles including The Metropolitan Orchestra, Syzygy Ensemble, Kammerklang, and Elysian Fields.

== Performer ==
Wilkins is an active performer, who has been described as "unconstrained by labels and is constantly exploring new ways to express herself musically" and as "a powerhouse player – with taste". In her performances, she explores stream-of-consciousness improvisations alongside her composed pieces and re-interpretations, often using loop pedal and visual projections. She has a range of musical themes in her shows from human rights to astronomy to nature, and she tailors her shows to the venue and audience.

Outer space is a major inspiration for her music and she often uses open source NASA footage to accompany the performance. Her improvisations are spontaneous musical ideas inspired by her myriad of music experiences with the aim of synthesizing into one voice, creating emotional connection and attaining a meditative state.

She performs her own notated music, as well as being an improviser. Wilkins often improvises with First Nations didgeridoo player Gumaroy Newman as an indigenous-jazz fusion duo, Yulugi. In 2019 they were interviewed by Andrew Ford, on the ABC Radio National program The Music Show.

Wilkin's is also a founding member of the Ephemera Quartet. Their 2021 album Blackholes and Modulations was reviewed by the Sydney Morning Herald as "the end result is music of peculiar depth and mystery that somehow evades the laws of gravity".

There have been other collaborations with other high-profile Sydney musicians, including Emily Granger and Jeremy Rose.

Her debut album is titled Air in motion was launched at the Flute Tree in Sydney, Australia.

== Discography ==
Albums
Year	Title	Notes
2021	Set Me Free	with Jalal Mahamede.
2021	EPHEMERA: Blackholes and Modulations	Compositions inspired by astronomy and ensemble improvisations. With Elsen Price (double bass), Will Gilbert (trumpet), Carl St Jacques (viola).
2021	Guluu	Solo violin suite performed by Airena Nakamura.
2020	YULUGI - Chasing Stars to the Mother Tree	Improvisation duo with didgeridoo player Gumaroy Newman.
2020	So What Bach	Solo piano improvisations on Bach classics.
2017	EPHEMERA: Orbits and Riffs	Compositions inspired by astronomy and ensemble improvisations. With Elsen Price (double bass) and Will Gilbert (trumpet).
2017	Keys Across the Sky	Solo piano compositions and improvisations.
2017	Air in Motion	Solo flute compositions and improvisations.
2011	Jazz Reverie	Solo piano improvisations.
