= Alon Ilsar =

Australian drummer

Alon Ilsar is a composer, producer, drummer, instrument designer and electronic percussionist.

Based in Sydney, Australia for the greater portion of his musical career, Alon is most well-known for performing in Company B's award-winning musical, Keating! which toured Australia from November 2006 until August 2008. During Keating!'s successful season, Alon was awarded an Australia Council for the Arts grant to fund his choose-your-own adventure style musical game piece, The Colors Interactive Comeback Show which was performed at the Adelaide Fringe Festival, the Melbourne International Comedy Festival and the Sydney Comedy Festival He has also received an Australia Council for the Arts grant to design and build a new electronic percussion instrument called the 'Air Sticks'. In 2010, he performed with Meow Meow at the Edinburgh Fringe Festival and joined Aronas, brainchild of Australian Jazz Bell Award winner, Aron Ottignon for their European tour.

His theatre credits also extend to his performance as the drummer and sound designer in Sam Atwell's play Bondi Dreaming, the touring production Barrel of Monkeys (Strut'n'Fret), touring with Circus Monoxide as musical director, drummer and keys player, improvising drums in Spontaneous Broadway, and composing and sound designing for Emergence.

Other diverse projects he has been involved in include The Colors Tribute Band, Gauche, Trigger Happy, Foley, Horse Feathers, The Renovators, The BZNZZ, Pugsley Buzzard, Darth Vegas, Gl;tch Jukebox, The Rescue Ships, Brian Campeau, Dave Sattout, Killsong, the Belvoirs, Donne, The Ben Romalis Trio The Tango Saloon and Brainchip.

He is currently performing in the new musical Misanthropology written and directed by Eddie Perfect and Meow Meow's Feline Intimate.

== Discography ==
- The Colors Tribute Album Vol. 1 - Various Artists 2009
- The Musical - Keating! 2008
- Transylvania - The Tango Saloon 2008
- Trigger Happy - Comatone + Foley 2007
- Keating! - Company B Original Cast Recording 2007
- Quiet Music For Quiet People - Inga Liljestrom 2006
- Re-fashioned 007 (The James Bond Themes Go Under Cover) - Various Artists 2006
- Siesta Cinema - Gauche 2006
- Gl;tch Jukebox - Gl;tch Jukebox 2006
- Super Shiny Sydney - Various Artists 2006
- Trampled: The Elefant Traks Remix Album - Various Artists 2006
- Southern Winter, Northern Summer (Feral Media Sampler) - Various Artists 2005
- Repainted - Gauche 2005
- The Tango Saloon - The Tango Saloon 2005
- Ideophone - Foley 2005
- Paints Lane - Gauche 2005
- Darth Vegas - Darth Vegas 2003
- Sigh - Gauche 2003
- Parallel Universe - The Church 2002
- Chit - Yuklidt 1999
- I Am Brainchip (feat. Simon Mavin, Alon Ilsar, Laneous) - Brainchip 2025

== See also ==
- Music of Australia
