= Mark Harris (jazz musician) =

- Also known as: Buzz the Bandleader
- Born: June 3, 1975 (age 51); Ottawa, Canada
- Origin: Sydney, Australia
- Genres: Jazz, world, Gypsy, Children's
- Occupations: Instrumentalist, vocalist, composer
- Instruments: Double bass, bass guitar
- Years active: 1996-Present

Mark Harris is a jazz double bassist, vocalist and composer from Sydney, Australia. Co-creator and member of children's band Lah-Lah, featured on a TV show of the same name originally broadcast on channel Nick Jr. and more recently on ABC Kids. Tina Harris, his wife, has the title role of 'Lah-Lah' while Harris is 'Buzz the Bandleader', who plays 'Lola the Dancing Double Bass'.

Harris is a member of ARIA Music Awards winning, gypsy fusion band Monsieur Camembert. He also is a member of Baby et Lulu and The Tango Saloon.
