= APRA Music Awards of 2018 =

Annual Australian music awards

- Date: 10 April 2018
- Location: Sydney, Australia
- Website: apraamcos.com.au/awards/

The Australasian Performing Right Association Awards of 2018 (generally known as APRA Awards) are a series of related awards which include the APRA Music Awards, Art Music Awards, and Screen Music Awards. The APRA Music Awards of 2018 was the 36th annual ceremony by the Australasian Performing Right Association (APRA) and the Australasian Mechanical Copyright Owners Society (AMCOS) to award outstanding achievements in contemporary songwriting, composing and publishing. The ceremony was held on 10 April 2018 at the International Convention Centre Sydney. The host for the ceremony was Julia Zemiro.

The Art Music Awards ceremony was held on 21 August 2018 at the Plaza Ballroom, Melbourne. They were presented by APRA, AMCOS and the Australian Music Centre (AMC), to "recognise achievement in the composition, performance, education and presentation of Australian art music. Art music covers activity across contemporary classical music, contemporary jazz and improvised music, experimental music and sound art." The Screen Music Awards were issued on 19 November at the Melbourne Recital Centre by APRA, AMCOS and Australian Guild of Screen Composers (AGSC), which "acknowledges excellence and innovation in the field of screen composition."

In mid-March nominations for the APRA Music Awards were announced on multiple news sources: M-Phazes and Peter James Harding p.k.a. Thief both received the most with four nominations each. Midnight Oil were honoured by the Ted Albert Award for Outstanding Services to Australian Music. Songwriter of the Year was A.B. Original's Adam Briggs and Daniel Rankine. A new category, Licensee of the Year Award, was introduced and the Settlers Tavern in Margaret River, Western Australia is the inaugural winner.

== APRA Music Awards ==
=== Blues & Roots Work of the Year ===
Title and/or artist	Writer(s)	Publisher(s)	Result
"Best Part of Me" – Busby Marou	Thomas Busby, Jeremy Marou, Jon Hume	Sony/ATV Music Publishing	Won
"Getaway Car" – Busby Marou	Thomas Busby, Jeremy Marou, David Ryan Harris	Sony/ATV Music Publishing	Nominated
"Isn't It a Pity" – Bernard Fanning	Bernard Fanning	—N/a	Nominated
"Jungle" – Tash Sultana	Tash Sultana	Kobalt Music Publishing o.b.o. Tash Sultana P/L	Nominated
"Reckless" – Bernard Fanning	Bernard Fanning	—N/a	Nominated

=== Breakthrough Songwriter of the Year ===
Title and/or artist	Writer(s)	Publisher(s)	Result
Alex Lahey	Alex Lahey	Native Tongue Music Publishing	Nominated
Ben Abraham	Ben Abraham	Sony/ATV Music Publishing Australia o.b.o. WGBR Music	Nominated
Celia Pavey p.k.a. Vera Blue	Celia Pavey	Universal Music Publishing / Canal Music Publishing	Nominated
Gretta Ray	Gretta Ray	—N/a	Nominated
Sarah Aarons	Sarah Aarons	Sony/ATV Music Publishing	Won

=== Country Work of the Year ===
Title and/or artist	Writer(s)	Publisher(s)	Result
"Ain't No Little Girl" – Kasey Chambers	Kasey Chambers	Mushroom Music	Nominated
"Don't Wish It All Away" – The McClymonts	Brooke McClymont, Mollie McClymont, Samantha McClymont, Lindsey Jackson	Sony/ATV Music Publishing, Native Tongue Music Publishing	Nominated
"House" – The McClymonts	Brooke McClymont, Mollie McClymont, Samantha McClymont, Sarah Aarons, Michael Fatkin	Sony/ATV Music Publishing, Universal Music Publishing	Nominated
"Kiss Somebody" – Morgan Evans	Morgan Evans, Chris DeStefano, Josh Osborne	Warner/Chappell Music Publishing o.b.o. SongsByMe, Sony/ATV Music Publishing o.b.o. CDs Words & Music, Kobalt Music Publishing o.b.o. Smackville Music and Anderson Fork in the Road Music	Won
"My Breakup Anthem" – Caitlyn Shadbolt	Caitlyn Shadbolt, Jared Porter	—N/a	Nominated

=== Dance Work of the Year ===
Title and/or artist	Writer(s)	Publisher(s)	Result
"Call on Me (Ryan Riback Remix)" – Starley	Starley Hope, Peter Wadams	Sony/ATV Music Publishing o.b.o. Alive and Well Songs, Kobalt Music Publishing o.b.o. P-Money Music	Nominated
"Chameleon" – Pnau	Nick Littlemore, Sam Littlemore, Peter Mayes	Universal Music Publishing, 120 Publishing, Universal Music Publishing o.b.o. Chenfeld	Nominated
"Fake Magic" – Peking Duk featuring AlunaGeorge	Adam Hyde, Reuben Styles, Sam Littlemore, Laura Lowther, Frances Dewji, George Reid	Universal Music Publishing, 120 Publishing	Nominated
"Mind Made Up" – Cookin' on 3 Burners featuring Kylie Auldist (Lenno vs CO3B)	Lance Ferguson, Ivan Khatchoyan, Jake Mason	Universal Music Publishing, Origin Music Publishing	Nominated
"Stranger" – Peking Duk featuring Elliphant	Adam Hyde, Reuben Styles, Kaelyn Behr (p.k.a. Styalz), Elliphant, Daniel Goudie, Ashley Milton	Universal Music Publishing, Sony/ATV Music Publishing, Kobalt Music Publishing o.b.o. Publishing Company Ten AB and Prescription Songs, BMG	Won

=== International Work of the Year ===
Title and/or artist	Writer(s)	Publisher(s)	Result
"24K Magic" – Bruno Mars	Bruno Mars, Christopher Brown (a.k.a. Brody Brown), Philip Lawrence	Warner/Chappell Music, Warner/Chappell Music o.b.o. Late 80's Music and Thou Art the Hunger, Universal/MCA Music o.b.o. ZZR Music	Nominated
"Castle on the Hill" – Ed Sheeran	Ed Sheeran, Benjamin Levin	Sony/ATV Music Publishing, Universal/MCA Music Publishing o.b.o. Please Don't Forget to Pay Me Music	Nominated
"Shape of You" – Ed Sheeran	Ed Sheeran, Kevin Briggs, Kandi Burruss, Tameka Cottle, Steven McCutcheon, John McDaid	Sony/ATV Music Publishing, BMG and Warner/Chappell Music o.b.o. She K'em Down and Pepper Drive Music, Sony/ATV Music Publishing and Warner/Chappell Music o.b.o. Kandacy Music and Tony Mercedes Music, Sony/ATV Music Publishing and Warner/Chappell Music o.b.o. Tiny Tam Music and Tony Mercedes Music, Universal Music Publishing o.b.o. Rokstone Music, Kobalt Music Publishing o.b.o. Spirit B-Unique Polar Patrol	Won
"Something Just Like This" – The Chainsmokers and Coldplay	Andrew Taggart, Chris Martin, Guy Berryman, Jonathan Buckland, William Champion	Sony/ATV Music Publishing o.b.o. Nice Hair Publishing, Universal Music Publishing MGB	Nominated
"There's Nothing Holdin' Me Back" – Shawn Mendes	Shawn Mendes, Scott Friedman, Teddy Geiger, Geoffrey Warburton	Universal/MCA Music Publishing o.b.o. Mendes Music, Warner/Chappell Music, BMG and Mushroom Music o.b.o. Big Deal Music LLC, Sony/ATV Music Publishing	Nominated

=== Licensee of the Year Award ===
Venue	Location	Result
Settlers Tavern	Margaret River, Western Australia	Won

=== Most Played Australian Work ===
Title and/or artist	Writer(s)	Publisher(s)	Result
"Adore" – Amy Shark	Amy Billings (p.k.a. Amy Shark), Mark Landon (p.k.a. M-Phazes)	Mushroom Music o.b.o. Unified Music Publishing, Universal Music Publishing	Nominated
"Call on Me (Ryan Riback Remix)" – Starley	Starley Hope, Peter Wadams	Sony/ATV Music Publishing o.b.o. Alive and Well Songs, Kobalt Music Publishing o.b.o. P-Money Music	Nominated
"Chameleon" – Pnau	Nick Littlemore, Sam Littlemore, Peter Mayes	Universal Music Publishing, 120 Publishing, Universal Music Publishing o.b.o. Chenfeld	Nominated
"Fallin'" – Jessica Mauboy	Kayla Rae Bonnici (p.k.a. Ivy Adara), Peter James Harding (p.k.a. Thief), Louis Schoorl	Kobalt Music Publishing o.b.o. Prescription Songs, Universal Music Publishing, Kobalt Music Publishing o.b.o. I Am a Sherpa Music, Amsterdam Central Music and Seven Peaks Music	Nominated
"Stranger" – Peking Duk featuring Elliphant	Adam Hyde, Reuben Styles, Kaelyn Behr (p.k.a. Styalz), Elliphant, Daniel Goudie, Ashley Milton	Universal Music Publishing, Sony/ATV Music Publishing, Kobalt Music Publishing o.b.o. Publishing Company Ten AB and Prescription Songs, BMG	Won

=== Most Played Australian Work Overseas ===
Title and/or artist	Writer(s)	Publisher(s)	Result
"Cheap Thrills" – Sia	Sia Furler, Gregory Kurstin	Sony/ATV Music Publishing	Won

=== Overseas Recognition Award ===
Writer(s)	Publisher(s)	Result
Ben Abraham	Sony/ATV Music Publishing o.b.o. WGBR Music	Won
Kylie Sackley	—N/a	Won

=== Pop Work of the Year ===
Title and/or artist	Writer(s)	Publisher(s)	Result
"Adore" – Amy Shark	Amy Billings (p.k.a. Amy Shark), Mark Landon (p.k.a. M-Phazes)	Mushroom Music o.b.o. Unified Music Publishing, Universal Music Publishing	Won
"Fallin'" – Jessica Mauboy	Kayla Rae Bonnici (p.k.a. Ivy Adara), Peter James Harding (p.k.a. Thief), Louis Schoorl	Kobalt Music Publishing o.b.o. Prescription Songs, Universal Music Publishing, Kobalt Music Publishing o.b.o. I Am a Sherpa Music, Amsterdam Central Music and Seven Peaks Music	Nominated
"Lay It on Me" – Vance Joy	James Keogh (p.k.a. Vance Joy), Dave Bassett	Mushroom Music o.b.o. Unified Music Publishing, Mushroom Music o.b.o. Reservoir Media Music	Nominated
"Set in Stone" – Guy Sebastian	Guy Sebastian, Stuart Crichton, Taylor Parks	Universal Music Publishing, Native Tongue Music Publishing, Warner/Chappell Music o.b.o. Taylor Monet Music	Nominated
"Waves" – Dean Lewis	Dean Lewis, Nicholas Atkinson, Edward Holloway	Kobalt Music Publishing o.b.o. Specific Music, BMG o.b.o. Stage 3 Music Publishing, BMG	Nominated

=== Rock Work of the Year ===
Title and/or artist	Writer(s)	Publisher(s)	Result
"Brace" – Birds of Tokyo	Ian Berney, Ian Kenny, Glenn Sarangapany, Adam Spark, Adam Weston	Mushroom Music	Won
"Creepin'" – Kingswood	Alex Laska	Native Tongue Music Publishing	Nominated
"Empire" – Birds of Tokyo	Ian Berney, Ian Kenny, Glenn Sarangapany, Adam Spark, Adam Weston, David Bottrill	Mushroom Music, Sony/ATV Music Publishing o.b.o. Real World Music	Nominated
"Scott Green" – Dune Rats	Danny Beusaraus, Brett Jansch, BC Michaels, Zachary Carper	Sony/ATV Music Publishing, Mushroom Music o.b.o. Big Deal Music LLC	Nominated
"The Producer" – Cable Ties	Shauna Boyle, Nicholas Brown, Jennifer McKechnie	—N/a	Nominated

=== Song of the Year ===
Title and/or artist	Writer(s)	Publisher(s)	Result
"Fallin'" – Jessica Mauboy	Kayla Rae Bonnici (p.k.a. Ivy Adara), Peter James Harding (p.k.a. Thief), Louis Schoorl	Kobalt Music Publishing o.b.o. Prescription Songs, Universal Music Publishing, Kobalt Music Publishing o.b.o. I Am a Sherpa Music, Amsterdam Central Music and Seven Peaks Music	Nominated
"Firewood and Candles" – Paul Kelly	Paul Kelly, Billy Miller	Sony/ATV Music Publishing	Won
"Running Second" – Ainslie Wills	Ainslie Wills, Lawrence Folvig	Sony/ATV Music Publishing	Nominated
"Weekends" – Amy Shark	Amy Billings (p.k.a. Amy Shark)	Mushroom Music	Nominated
"What Can I Do if the Fire Goes Out" – Gang of Youths	David Le'aupepe	Universal Music Publishing	Nominated

=== Songwriter of the Year ===
- A.B. Original's Adam Briggs p.k.a. Briggs and Daniel Rankine p.k.a. Trials

=== Ted Albert Award for Outstanding Services to Australian Music ===
- Midnight Oil members Peter Garrett, Rob Hirst, Martin Rotsey, Jim Moginie and Bones Hillman

=== Urban Work of the Year ===
Title and/or artist	Writer(s)	Publisher(s)	Result
"Catch 22" – Alasdair Murray p.k.a. Illy featuring p.k.a. Anne-Marie	Alasdair Murray p.k.a. Illy, Mark Landon p.k.a. M-Phazes, Grant Michaels, Suzanne Shinn	Mushroom Music o.b.o. Unified Music Publishing, Universal Music Publishing, Native Tongue Music Publishing o.b.o. Songs Music Publishing	Won
"Moments" – Bliss n Eso featuring Gavin James	Kaelyn Behr (Styalz), Peter James Harding p.k.a. Thief, Max Mackinnon p.k.a. MC Eso, Nicholas Martin, Jonathan Notley p.k.a. MC Bliss, Ryan Vojtesak	Sony/ATV Music Publishing, Universal Music Publishing, Mushroom Music, Universal/MCA Music Publishing	Nominated
"Oh My" – Illy featuring Jenna McDougall	Alasdair Murray (p.k.a. Illy), Mark Landon p.k.a. M-Phazes, Jefferson Wolfe	Mushroom Music o.b.o. Unified Music Publishing, Universal Music Publishing	Nominated
"Simulation" – Tkay Maidza	Tkay Maidza, Jessica Higgs p.k.a. George Maple, Luke McKay	Kobalt Music Publishing, Kobalt Music Publishing o.b.o. Utopian Ideas Pty Ltd, Kobalt Music Publishing o.b.o. Dew Process	Nominated
"Think About It" – Thundamentals featuring Peta & the Wolves	Jesse Ferris, Morgan Jones, Kevin Kerr, Brendan Tuckerman, Peta Jeffress	Sony/ATV Music Publishing, Universal Music Publishing o.b.o. The Kennel AB	Nominated

== Art Music Awards ==
=== Instrumental Work of the Year ===
Title	Composer	Performer	Result
Aspects of Return	Jakub Jankowski	Nicolas Altstaedt and Aleksandar Madžar	Nominated
Cantor (after Willa Cather)	Lisa Illean	Ensemble Offspring	Won
Up in the Clouds	Corrina Bonshek	All of the Above	Nominated
When We Speak	Lisa Cheney	Gemma Tomlinson	Nominated

=== Jazz Work of the Year ===
Title	Composer	Performer	Result
[A]part	Ellen Kirkwood	Sirens Big Band, Andrea Keller (piano), Sandy Evans (saxophones), Gian Slater (voice)	Nominated
American Counterpoint	Matthew Sheens	Matthew Sheens, Lyndon Gray, Myele Manzanza, Zephyr String Quartet	Won
Opioid	Johannes Luebbers	Johannes Luebbers Dectet	Nominated
rockpoolmirror	Sandy Evans	Sandy Evans (saxophone), Steve Elphick (double bass), Alon Ilsar (drums), Satsuki Odamura (koto), Adrian Sherriff (trombone), Bobby Singh (tabla)	Nominated

=== Orchestral Work of the Year ===
Title	Composer	Performer	Result
"Concerto for Trombone and Orchestra"	Paul Stanhope	Joshua Davis (trombone), West Australian Symphony Orchestra, Asher Fisch (conductor)	Won
"Entropia for Symphony Orchestra, no. 441 (2016-2017)"	Andrián Pertout	Tatarstan National Symphony Orchestra, Guerassim Voronkov (conductor)	Nominated
"Spirals for Clarinet, Bassoon and Chamber Orchestra"	Maria Grenfell	Tasmanian Symphony Orchestra, James Feddeck (conductor), Andrew Seymour (clarinet), Tahnee van Herk (bassoon)	Nominated
Spiritus	Lachlan Skipworth	West Australian Symphony Orchestra, Daniel Blendulf (conductor)	Nominated

=== Vocal / Choral Work of the Year ===
Title	Composer / librettist	Performer	Result
Biographica	Mary Finsterer / Tom Wright	Sydney Chamber Opera, Ensemble Offspring, Jack Symonds (conductor)	Won
Comeclose and Sleepnow: six Liverpool love songs	Andrew Ford / poems by Adrian Henri, Brian McGough, Brian Patten	The Monash Art Ensemble, with Gian Slater, Paul Grabowsky (conductor)	Nominated
Fiat Lux: The Light Cycle	Alice Chance	Leichhardt Espresso Chorus, The Song Company, Alice Chance, Benjamin Burton (and audience), Michelle Leonard (conductor)	Nominated
On Earth as in Heaven	Anne Cawrse / text by Michael Leunig	Adelaide Chamber Singers, Christie Anderson (conductor)	Nominated

=== Performance of the Year ===
Title	Composer / librettist	Performer	Result
A Book of Migrations	Liam Flenady	Matthew Horsley	Nominated
Lobster Tales and Turtle Soup	Holly Harrison	Eighth Blackbird	Won
Maali, op. 101 – "Concerto for oboe, clarinet, bassoon and horn with orchestra"	Andrew Schultz	West Australian Symphony Orchestra and soloists; Simone Young (conductor)	Nominated
"String Quintet No. 2"	Gordon Kerry	Australian String Quartet and Pieter Wispelwey	Nominated

=== Award for Excellence by an Individual ===
Individual	Work	Result
Carl Vine	2017 activities	Won
Connor D'Netto	Outstanding artistic direction of Argo throughout 2017	Nominated
Keyna Wilkins	Activities in original art music throughout 2017 as a composer-musician including the release of three original albums	Nominated

=== Award for Excellence by an Organisation ===
Organisation	Work	Result
Australian Art Orchestra	Collaboration, touring, mentorship and innovative programming	Nominated
Gondwana Choirs	"Songs of My Country" collaboration with the Vienna Boys Choir	Nominated
Move Records	50 years of recording and release of new music	Nominated
Tura New Music	30 years of presenting, producing, commissioning, exhibiting, publishing, advocating and supporting Australian art music	Won

=== Award for Excellence in Music Education ===
Organisation / individual	Work	Result
Australian Art Orchestra	Creative Music Intensive	Nominated
Melbourne Conservatorium of Music Wind Symphony	MCM Wind Symphony Performances	Nominated
MLC School, Sydney	MLC School Sydney Opera House Concert 2017	Nominated
Young Music Society (Australian Capital Territory)	50 years of community youth music activity	Won

=== Award for Excellence in a Regional Area ===
Organisation / individual	Work	Result
Big hART	Acoustic Life of Sheds	Won
Moorambilla Voices	2017 season	Nominated
The Orpheus Club String Quartet	2017 "Festival in a String Quartet" Central QLD tour	Nominated
Tyalgum Music Festival	2017 Tyalgum Music Festival	Nominated

=== Award for Excellence in Experimental Music ===
Organisation / individual	Work	Result
Chamber Made	Between 8 and 9 (Chengdu Teahouse Project) with lead artists Madeleine Flynn and Tim Humphrey	Won
Eugene Ughetti	Assembly Operation	Nominated
Splinter Orchestra	New work, performances, exhibitions and concerts	Nominated
Vanessa Tomlinson, Leah Barclay and John Ferguson	100 Ways to Listen	Nominated

=== Award for Excellence in Jazz ===
Organisation / individual	Work	Result
Alister Spence Trio	Not Everything But Enough	Nominated
Barney McAll	Hearing the Blood	Nominated
Jeremy Rose	Recording, performance, composition and promotion of contemporary jazz through Earshift Music	Nominated
Sandy Evans	rockpoolmirror	Won

=== Distinguished Services to Australian Music ===
Organisation / individual	Result
Robyn Holmes	Won

== Screen Music Awards ==
=== Feature Film Score of the Year ===
Title	Composer	Result
Brothers' Nest	Richard Pleasance	Nominated
Fahrenheit 451	Matteo Zingales, Antony Partos	Nominated
Ladies in Black	Christopher Gordon	Nominated
The Butterfly Tree	Caitlin Yeo	Won

=== Best Music for an Advertisement ===
Title	Composer	Result
Forty Winks	Jackson Milas	Won
Singapore Airlines: "The Briefcase"	Scott Langley	Nominated
Tiger Beer: "Chinese New Year"	Ben Lam	Nominated
Tourism Tasmania: "Go Behind the Scenery XI"	Nicholas West, Daniel Higson, Antony Smith	Nominated

=== Best Music for Children's Television ===
Title	Composer	Result
Guess How Much I Love You: "Christmas to the Moon and Back"	Ryan Grogan	Nominated
Jar Dwellers SOS!	David Cheshire	Nominated
The Deep: "The Missing"	Nerida Tyson-Chew	Won
The Wild Adventures of Blinky Bill: "The Budgie Smuggler"	Russell Thornton	Nominated

=== Best Music for a Documentary ===
Title	Composer	Result
My Mother's Lost Children	Dale Cornelius	Nominated
The Director and the Jedi	Antony Partos	Nominated
A Stargazer's Guide to the Cosmos	Sean Tinnion	Won
The Story of Earth	Dale Cornelius	Nominated

=== Best Music for a Mini-Series or Telemovie ===
Title	Composer	Result
Mystery Road	Antony Partos, Matteo Zingales	Won
The House with Annabel Crabb	Caitlin Yeo	Nominated
Underbelly Files: Chopper	Burkhard Dallwitz	Nominated
Wake in Fright	Antony Partos, Matteo Zingales	Nominated

=== Best Music for a Short Film ===
Title	Composer	Result
Abandon Triptych	Kyls Burtland	Nominated
Barbara	Caitlin Yeo	Nominated
Lost and Found	Adrian Sergovich	Won
The Passion Films: Alice	Basil Hogios	Nominated

=== Best Music for a Television Series or Serial ===
Series or Serial	Composer	Result
The Doctor Blake Mysteries	Dale Cornelius	Nominated
Glitch	Cornel Wilczek	Nominated
Harrow	Matteo Zingales	Nominated
Picnic at Hanging Rock	Cezary Skubiszewski, Jan Skubiszewski	Won

=== Best Original Song Composed for the Screen ===
Song title	Work	Composer	Result
"Everywhere's a Dance Floor"	The Justine Clarke Show	Justine Clarke, Sean Peter	Nominated
"Grace Beside Me"	Grace Beside Me	Amanda Brown, Emily Wurramara	Nominated
"Now I Know"	Pulse	Oscar Joe Gross	Won
"Prison Bound"	Brothers' Nest	Richard Pleasance, Jojo Rainwater	Nominated

=== Best Soundtrack Album ===
Title	Composer	Result
Every Day	Elliott Wheeler	Nominated
Fahrenheit 451	Matteo Zingales, Antony Partos	Nominated
Ghosthunter	Rafael May	Nominated
The Butterfly Tree	Caitlin Yeo	Won

=== Best Television Theme ===
Title	Composer	Result
Harrow	Matteo Zingales	Won
Lawless - The Real Bushrangers	Rafael May	Nominated
Oddlands	Joff Bush	Nominated
A Stargazer's Guide to the Cosmos	Sean Tinnion	Nominated

=== Most Performed Screen Composer – Australia ===
Composer	Result
Adam Gock, Dinesh Wicks	Won
Jay Stewart	Nominated
Mitch Stewart	Nominated
Neil Sutherland	Nominated

=== Most Performed Screen Composer – Overseas ===
Composer	Result
Alastair Ford	Nominated
Garry McDonald, Lawrence Stone	Nominated
Jed Kurzel	Nominated
Neil Sutherland	Won

=== Distinguished Services to the Australian Screen ===
Organisation / individual	Result
Robert Connolly	Won
