= 2005 ARIA Music Awards =

Annual Australian music awards ceremony

- Date: 23 October 2005
- Venue: Sydney SuperDome, Sydney, New South Wales

Highlights
- Most wins: Missy Higgins (5)
- Most nominations: Missy Higgins (8)
- Website: ariaawards.com.au

Television/radio coverage
- Network: Network Ten

The 19th Annual Australian Recording Industry Association Music Awards (generally known as the ARIA Music Awards or simply the ARIAs) were held on 23 October 2005 at the Sydney SuperDome at the Sydney Olympic Park complex, thus continuing the previous year's innovation of televising the awards on Sunday evening. A varied cast of presenters included Merrick and Rosso (who opened the televised show), stand-up comic Dave Hughes, Gretel Killeen, David Hasselhoff, and Hamish & Andy.

On 14 July 2005 ARIA sought to create a separate standalone 'ARIA Icons: Hall of Fame' event as only one or two acts could be inducted under the old format due to time restrictions. Six acts were inducted into the Hall of Fame in July with an additional act inducted at the following ARIA Music Awards in October.

== Awards ==
Winners are highlighted in bold, other final nominees are in plain.

=== ARIA Awards ===
- Album of the Year
  - **Missy Higgins** – **The Sound of White**
    - Ben Lee – Awake Is the New Sleep
    - Evermore – Dreams
    - Keith Urban – Be Here
    - Sarah Blasko – The Overture & the Underscore
- Single of the Year
  - **Ben Lee** – "**Catch My Disease**"
    - Evermore – "For One Day"
    - Missy Higgins – "The Special Two"
    - Thirsty Merc – "Someday, Someday"
    - Wolfmother – "Woman"
- Best Male Artist
  - **Ben Lee** – **Awake Is the New Sleep**
    - John Butler – "Something's Gotta Give"
    - Keith Urban – Be Here
    - Lior – Autumn Flow
    - Paul Kelly – Foggy Highway
- Best Female Artist
  - **Missy Higgins** – **The Sound of White**
    - Kylie Minogue – "I Believe in You"
    - Mia Dyson – Parking Lots
    - Natalie Imbruglia – Counting Down the Days
    - Sarah Blasko – The Overture & the Underscore
- Best Group
  - **Eskimo Joe** – "**Older Than You**"
    - Evermore – Dreams
    - Grinspoon – Thrills, Kills & Sunday Pills
    - Powderfinger – These Days
    - Thirsty Merc – "Someday, Someday"
- Highest-Selling Album
  - **Missy Higgins** – **The Sound of White**
    - Anthony Callea – Anthony Callea
    - Casey Donovan – For You
    - Delta Goodrem – Mistaken Identity
    - Guy Sebastian – Beautiful Life
- Highest-Selling Single
  - **Anthony Callea** – "**The Prayer**"
    - Anthony Callea – "Rain" / "Bridge over Troubled Water"
    - Casey Donovan – "Listen with Your Heart"
    - Delta Goodrem & Brian McFadden – "Almost Here"
    - Missy Higgins – "The Special Two"
- Breakthrough Artist – Album
  - **Missy Higgins** – **The Sound of White**
    - Evermore – Dreams
    - Lior – Autumn Flow
    - Little Birdy – BigBigLove
    - Sarah Blasko – The Overture & the Underscore
- Breakthrough Artist – Single
  - **End of Fashion** – "**O Yeah**"
    - Joel Turner and the Modern Day Poets – "These Kids"
    - Kisschasy – "Do-Do's & Whoa-Oh's"
    - The Veronicas – "4ever"
    - Wolfmother – "Woman"
- Best Adult Contemporary Album
  - **The Go-Betweens** – **Oceans Apart**
    - Architecture in Helsinki – In Case We Die
    - John Farnham & Tom Jones – Together in Concert
    - Renée Geyer – Tonight
    - The Church – El Momento Descuidado
- Best Blues & Roots Album
  - **Mia Dyson** – **Parking Lots**
    - Ash Grunwald – Live at the Corner
    - The Beautiful Girls – We're Already Gone
    - Jeff Lang – You Have to Dig Deep to Bury Daddy
    - The Waifs – A Brief History...
- Best Children's Album
  - **The Wiggles** – **Live: Hot Potatoes**
    - Bananas in Pyjamas – Sing and Be Happy
    - Hi-5 – Making Music
    - Sean O'Boyle – Hush Little Baby
    - The Hooley Dooleys – Super Dooper
- Best Comedy Release
  - **Tripod** – **Middleborough Rd**
    - Jimeoin – Third Drawer Down
    - Rodney Rude – Twice As Rude
    - Shane Dundas & Dave Collins – The Umbilical Brothers
    - Various Artists – Classic Skithouse
- Best Country Album
  - **Keith Urban** – **Be Here**
    - Adam Harvey – Can't Settle For Less
    - Audrey Auld-Mezera – Texas
    - Paul Kelly & the Stormwater Boys – Foggy Highway
    - Sara Storer – Firefly
- Best Dance Release
  - **Infusion** – **Six Feet Above Yesterday**
    - Bodyrockers – "I Like the Way"
    - Deepface – "Been Good"
    - Dirty South – "Sleazy"
    - Rogue Traders – "Voodoo Child"
- Best Independent Release
  - **Ben Lee** – **Awake Is the New Sleep**
    - Architecture in Helsinki – In Case We Die
    - Joel Turner and the Modern Day Poets – Joel Turner and the Modern Day Poets
    - Lior – Autumn Flow
    - The Waifs – A Brief History...
- Best Music DVD
  - **Jet** – **Right! Right! Right!**
    - Hoodoo Gurus – Tunnel Vision
    - Powderfinger – These Days: Live in Concert
    - The Dissociatives – Sydney Circa 2004/08
    - Various Artists – WaveAid
- Best Pop Release
  - **Missy Higgins** – **The Sound of White**
    - Ben Lee – Awake Is the New Sleep
    - Kylie Minogue – I Believe in You
    - Sarah Blasko – The Overture & the Underscore
    - Thirsty Merc – "Someday, Someday"
- Best Rock Album
  - **Grinspoon** – **Thrills, Kills & Sunday Pills**
    - Evermore – Dreams
    - Little Birdy – BigBigLove
    - Shihad – Love Is the New Hate
    - The Cat Empire – Two Shoes
- Best Urban Release
  - **Daniel Merriweather** – "**She's Got Me**"
    - Butterfingers – "Figjam"
    - Jade MacRae – "So Hot Right Now"
    - Joel Turner and the Modern Day Poets – Joel Turner and the Modern Day Poets
    - Weapon X and Ken Hell – "Otherman"

=== Artisan Awards ===
- Best Cover Art
  - **Ben Lee, Lara Meyerratken, Dan Estabrook** – **Ben Lee** – **Awake Is the New Sleep**
    - Cameron Bird – Architecture in Helsinki – In Case We Die
    - Cathie Glassby – Missy Higgins – The Sound of White
    - David Homer & Aaron Hayward, Debaser – Kisschasy – United Paper People
    - Reg Mombassa – Paul Kelly & the Stormwater Boys – Foggy Highway
- Best Video
  - **Ben Quinn** – **End of Fashion** – "**O Yeah**"
    - Adrian Van De Velde – Thirsty Merc – "In the Summertime"
    - Ben Joss, Tribal – John Butler Trio – "Something's Gotta Give"
    - Ben Quinn – The Cat Empire – "The Car Song"
    - Sam Bennetts, Mad Angel – Rogue Traders – "Voodoo Child"
- Engineer of the Year
  - **Matt Lovell** – **The Mess Hall** – **Notes from a Ceiling**
    - James Ash – Rogue Traders – Voodoo Child
    - Paul McKercher – Little Birdy – BigBigLove
    - Paul McKercher & Eskimo Joe – Eskimo Joe – "Older Than You"
    - David Nicholas – Drag – The Way Out
- Producer of the Year
  - **David Nicholas** – **Drag** – **The Way Out**
    - Chris Joannou & The Mess Hall – The Mess Hall – Notes from a Ceiling
    - Harry Vanda & Glenn Goldsmith – The Wrights – "Evie Parts 1, 2 & 3"
    - Paul McKercher – Little Birdy – BigBigLove
    - Paul McKercher & Eskimo Joe – Eskimo Joe – "Older Than You"

=== Fine Arts Awards ===
- Best Classical Album
  - **Australian Brandenburg Orchestra** – **Sanctuary**
    - Elena Kats-Chernin – Wild Swans
    - Michael Kieran Harvey – Rabid Bay
    - Sara Macliver & Sally-Anne Russell – Baroque Duets
    - Slava Grigoryan – Afterimage
- Best Jazz Album
  - **Paul Grabowsky** & **Katie Noonan** – **Before Time Could Change Us**
    - Andrea Keller – Quartet Angels and Rascals
    - Aronas – Culture Tunnels
    - Oehlers & Keevers – Grace
    - The Necks – Mosquito / See Through
- Best Soundtrack / Cast / Show Recording
  - **Severed Heads** – **The Illustrated Family Doctor**
    - Art Phillips – Outback House
    - Ben Mingay & Deone Zanotto – Dirty Dancing – The Classic Story on Stage
    - Roger Mason – The Extra
    - Various Artists – Deck Dogz
- Best World Music Album
  - **Monsieur Camembert** – **Monsieur Camembert**
    - Bobby McLeod – Dumaradje
    - Cosmo Cosmolino – Nektar
    - Le Tuan Hung and others – On the Wings of a Butterfly
    - Southern Gospel Choir – Great Day
    - Various Artists – This Is the Place for a Song

== Hall of Fame inductees ==
On 14 July 2005, ARIA sought to create a separate standalone 'ARIA Icons: Hall of Fame' event, as only one or two acts could be inducted under the old format due to time restrictions. Since 2005 VH1 obtained the rights to broadcast the ceremony live on Foxtel, Austar and Optus networks; and each year five or six acts were inducted into the Hall of Fame with an additional act inducted at the following ARIA Music Awards. The following were inducted into the ARIA Hall of Fame in July:

- Smoky Dawson inducted by Jack Thompson
- The Easybeats inducted by Billy Thorpe
- Renée Geyer inducted by Michael Gudinski
- Hunters & Collectors inducted by Peter Garrett
- Normie Rowe inducted by Ian Meldrum
- Split Enz inducted by John Clarke

Inducted at the October ceremony:

- Jimmy Barnes inducted by Bernard Fanning

== Performers ==
The following artists performed during the 2005 ARIA Awards:

- Rogue Traders – "Voodoo Child"
- Thirsty Merc – "Someday, Someday"
- Evermore – "It's Too Late"
- Anthony Callea – "The Prayer"
- Missy Higgins – "The Sound of White"
- Grinspoon – "Hard Act to Follow"
- Neil Finn – "Better Be Home Soon" (Tribute to the late Paul Hester, who was in Split Enz and Crowded House with Finn)
- Ben Lee – "Catch My Disease"
- Jimmy Barnes – "Working Class Man"

== Channel V Oz Artist of the Year ==
- Channel V Oz Artist of the Year
  - Anthony Callea
    - Kisschasy
    - Missy Higgins
    - The Veronicas

== Judging academy ==
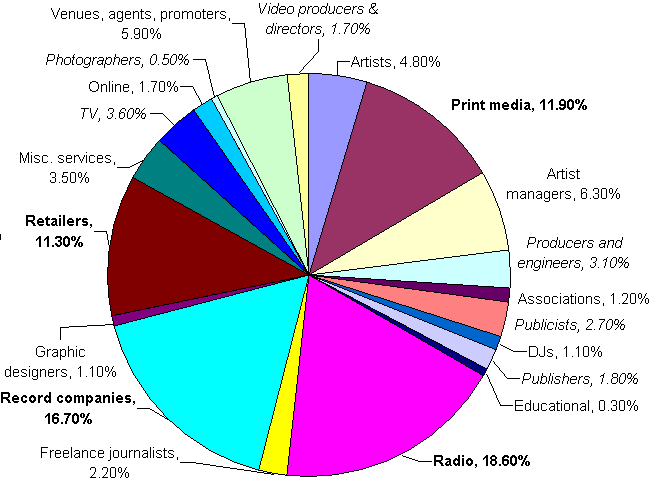
A breakdown of the 2005 judging academy.

In 2005, the generalist categories were determined by the "voting academy", which consisted of about 1000 representatives from across the music industry. Members of the academy are kept secret. Membership is by invitation only. An individual record company may have up to eight members on the academy. The only artists eligible to vote are winners and nominees from the previous year's awards. (See pie chart at right.)

== See also ==
- Music of Australia
- Rock music in Australia
