= Matt Smith (guitarist) =

Australian jazz guitarist

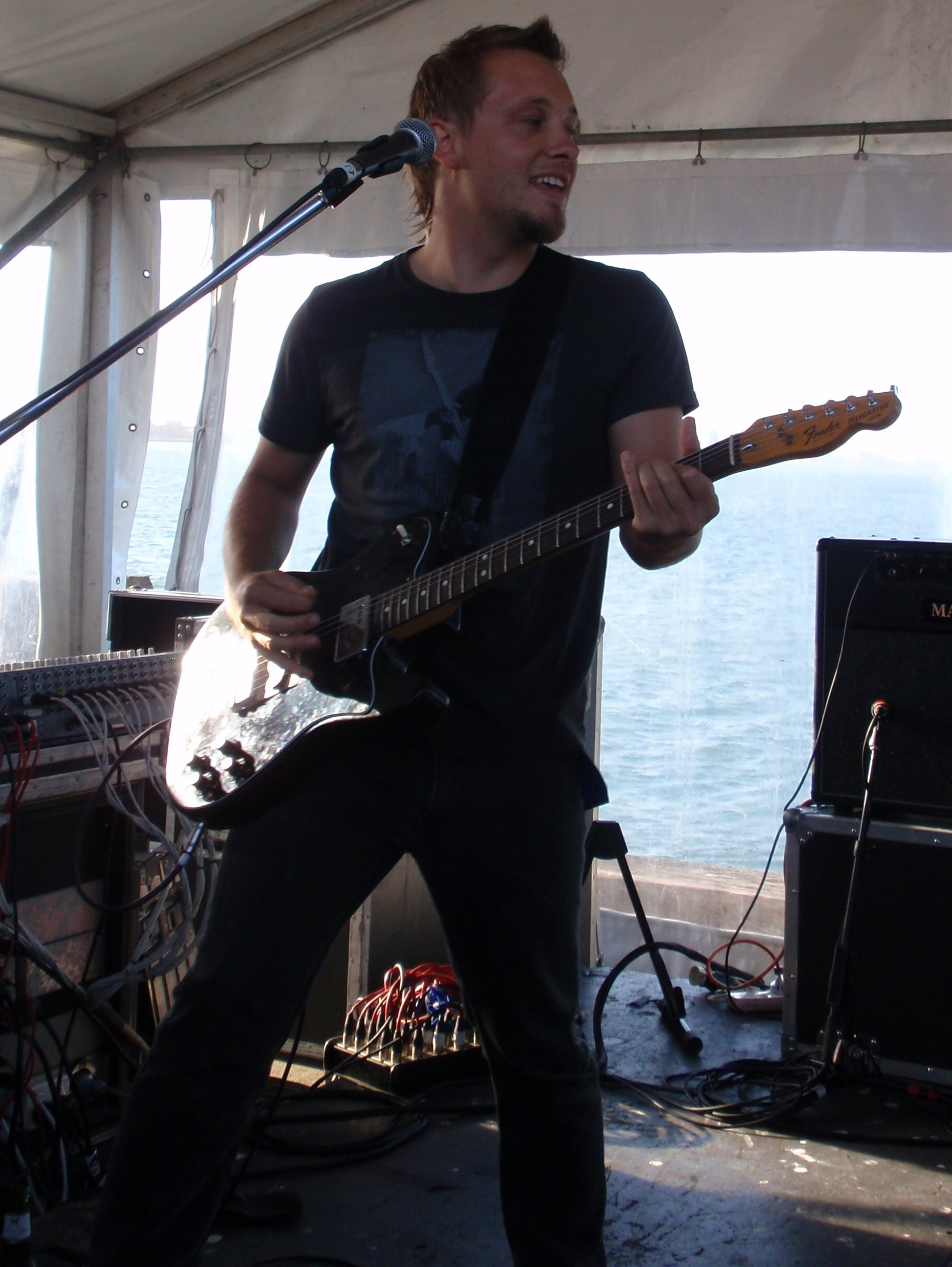
Matt Smith playing with Thirsty Merc in 2011

Matt Smith (born 2 February, 1985) is an Australian jazz guitarist. He is most widely known as the lead guitarist in the Australian pop rock band Thirsty Merc but also plays guitar for Sydney afrobeat/reggae band The Strides. He joined Thirsty Merc in January 2010 after helping record the band's third album, Mousetrap Heart, in Los Angeles in late 2009.

== Early years ==
Smith grew up in Mount Warrigal, a large suburb of Wollongong, New South Wales, Australia. From the age of 5 he took classical piano lessons because he was told that his hands were too small to play guitar. He eventually got his way and was given his first guitar for his 8th birthday and started tuition at 10.

Throughout high school, Smith played in the school concert band and during his HSC developed an interest in jazz. He then went on to study at the Wollongong Conservatorium of Music and completed a Bachelor of Contemporary Music in 2007.

== Thirsty Merc ==
Smith first met Rai Thistlethwayte, lead singer of Thirsty Merc, at a gig in Sydney and went on to work with Rai on his solo tour. After Sean, lead guitarist for Thirsty Merc, left the band indefinitely, Smith was asked to record the album Mousetrap Heart with the rest of the band in Los Angeles. Smith was officially made a part of the band in January 2010.
