= First Work =

EP by Thirsty Merc
- Released: Australia: 8 September 2003
- Recorded: 2003
- Genre: Rock
- Length: 15:52
- Label: Don't Music; Warner Music Australia

Thirsty Merc chronology
First Work (2003)	Thirsty Merc (2004)

Singles from First Work
- 1. "Wasting Time" Released: 2003; 2. "Emancipate Myself" Released: 2003

First Work is the debut EP release by Australia rock band Thirsty Merc released in 2003, which appeared on the ARIA Charts top 100. It features early versions of songs that the band re-recorded for their studio album Thirsty Merc.

== Track listing ==
All songs written by Rai Thistlethwayte.

1. "Wasting Time" – 3:55
2. "Emancipate Myself" – 3:44
3. "Baby Tell Me I'm the Only One" – 3:23
4. "Homewrecker" – 3:05
5. "Skeletal Wreck" – 1:45

== Personnel ==
- Rai Thistlethwayte – guitars, pianos and singer-songwriter
- Phil Stack – bass guitar and backing vocals
- Karl Robertson – drums and percussion
- Matt Baker – guitars and backing vocals

== Charts ==
Chart performance for First Work
Chart (2003)	Peak position
Australia (ARIA)	95
