= Wasting Time (Thirsty Merc song) =

Single by Thirsty Merc

from the album First Work
- Released: 2003 (Radio Only)
- Recorded: 2003
- Genre: Rock
- Label: Warner Music Australia
- Songwriter(s): Rai Thistlethwayte & Phil Stack
- Producer(s): Thirsty Merc

Thirsty Merc singles chronology
| "Wasting Time" (2003) | "Emancipate Myself" (2004) |

"Wasting Time" is a song by Thirsty Merc, released as their debut single in 2003. It was featured on their debut EP, First Work. Its radio success led to release of the band's debut self-titled album, Thirsty Merc, on which the track was featured. The track's accompanying one-shot video was also a huge hit.

== Music video ==
The music video uses the original version of the song. It begins with singer Rai Thistlethwayte walking towards the camera in a house singing the song. Through singing the song, he walks through the house and when the song reaches the chorus, he's cut to the band with guitar in hand and they begin playing all together. In sync with the muffled effect of the music, the video is distressed and aged until the first chorus. The video is filmed in a suburban area in Sydney, on the street where Rai's father used to live in the 1990s.
