= Deepface =

Deepface may refer to one of the following:

- Deepface (band), from Australia
- DeepFace, a facial recognition system created by Facebook in 2014
