= My Completeness =

Single by Thirsty Merc

from the album Thirsty Merc
- Released: 26 July 2004
- Genre: Pop rock
- Label: Warner Music Australia
- Songwriters: Rai Thistlethwayte, Phil Stack
- Producer: Lindsay Gravina

Thirsty Merc singles chronology
"Emancipate Myself" (2004)	"My Completeness" (2004)	"Someday, Someday" (2004)

"My Completeness" was the second single released from Thirsty Merc's debut album Thirsty Merc. Reaching number two on the Australian Airplay Chart, the single was the most successful single for the band at the time of its release. It performed considerably better than predecessor, Emancipate Myself, peaking at #27 on the Australian Singles Chart, while highlighting the musical depth and sincerity of the band that secured them a reputation as one of the world's premier alternative acts.

== Music video ==
The music video features all members of the band in an acoustic setting which is later met by various females surrounding the band filming them with handheld cameras. Additional footage is also taken by the actual handheld cameras seen throughout the video.

== Track listing ==
1. "My Completeness"
2. "Dreamer"
3. "No Sugar"
4. "Wasting Time"
5. "Emancipate Myself"

== Charts ==
Chart (2004)	Peak position
Australia (ARIA)	27
