= The Hard Way (Thirsty Merc song) =

Single by Thirsty Merc

from the album Slideshows
- Released: 15 September 2007
- Genre: Rock
- Length: 4:22
- Label: Warner Music Group
- Songwriter: Rai Thistlethwayte
- Producer: Lindsay Gravina

Thirsty Merc singles chronology
"20 Good Reasons" (2007)	"The Hard Way" (2007)	"Those Eyes" (2007/2008)

"The Hard Way" was the second single from Thirsty Merc's second album Slideshows. It was released on 15 September 2007, charting at a disappointing sixty-three on the Australian Singles Chart. It is maintained, however, that this came about due to high album sales upon the release of Slideshows.

== Track listing ==
1. The Hard Way (Radio Edit) – 3:57
2. The Vision (Live) – 6:34
3. 20 Good Reasons (Acoustic) – 3:35

== Charts ==
Chart performance for "The Hard Way"
Chart (2004)	Peak position
Australia (ARIA)	63
