= Emancipate Myself =

2004 single by Thirsty Merc

Single by Thirsty Merc

from the album First Work and Thirsty Merc
- B-side: "Small Time Politics"; "Lazy Susan" (live)
- Released: 5 April 2004
- Length: 4:16
- Label: WEA
- Songwriters: Rai Thistlethwayte; Phil Stack
- Producer: Thirsty Merc

Thirsty Merc singles chronology
| "Wasting Time" (2003) | "Emancipate Myself" (2004) | "My Completeness" (2004) |

"Emancipate Myself" is a song by Australian pop rock band Thirsty Merc. It was released as the second track from the band’s debut EP, First Work, and as the band's first official commercial single from their debut self-titled album, Thirsty Merc. It achieved mainstream success, reaching number 37 on the Australian ARIA Singles Chart. The music video for "Emancipate Myself", which involved the band playing in a corporate office, wearing suits and ties, followed in the footsteps of its predecessor Wasting Time in garnering huge support.

== Track listing ==
Australian CD single

1. "Emancipate Myself"
2. "Small Time Politics"
3. "Lazy Susan" (live at Birdland Studios)

== Charts ==
| Chart (2004) | Peak position |
|---|---|
| Australia (ARIA) | 37 |
