= Mousetrap Heart (song) =

Single by Thirsty Merc

from the album Mousetrap Heart
- Released: 21 May 2010
- Genre: Pop rock
- Length: 3:29
- Label: Warner Music Group
- Songwriter: Rai Thistlethwayte
- Producer: Matt Wallace

Thirsty Merc singles chronology
"Homesick" (2008)	"Mousetrap Heart" (2010)	"Tommy and Krista" (2010)

Alternative cover
- Promo single cover

"Mousetrap Heart" is the first single from Thirsty Merc's third album Mousetrap Heart. It was released as a digital download on 21 May 2010.

The track received positive reviews from fans and critics alike with most praising the band's polished new sound, owed partly to U.S. album producer, Matt Wallace (Maroon 5). Mousetrap Heart received heavy airplay in Australia soon after its release to radio in May 2010.

The female singer featured in Mousetrap Heart is Carmen Smith.

The single kicked off the Mousetrap Heart Australian Tour, in support the single and album. The music video was shot in Los Angeles and features LA-based, Argentinian dancer Carolina Cerisola dancing around and on a piano that singer Rai is playing.

== Track listing ==
1. "Mousetrap Heart" – 3:29

== Charts ==
Chart performance for "Mousetrap Heart"
Chart (2010)	Peak position
Australia (ARIA)	30
