= Mousetrap Heart =

Studio album by Thirsty Merc
- Released: 18 June 2010
- Recorded: 2009–2010
- Genre: Rock
- Label: Warner
- Producer: Matt Wallace

Thirsty Merc chronology
Slideshows (2007)	Mousetrap Heart (2010)	Acoustic Anniversary Album (AAA) (2014)

Singles from Mousetrap Heart
- 1. "Mousetrap Heart" Released: 21 May 2010; 2. "Tommy and Krista" Released: 3 September 2010; 3. "All My Life" Released: October 2010

Mousetrap Heart is the third studio album by Australian rock band Thirsty Merc. It was released on 18 June 2010, through Warner Music Australia. The title track was released as the first single on 21 May 2010. The album marks the band's first release with guitarist Matt Smith, since joining the band just after the departure of Sean Carey earlier in the year.

The album peaked at number 14 on the ARIA Charts.

== Track listing ==
All songs written by Rai Thistlethwayte.

1. "Mousetrap Heart" — 3:33
2. "Kiss Me Away" — 3:49
3. "All My Life" — 4:38
4. "Tommy and Krista" — 3:52
5. "DNA" — 3:24
6. "Mozambique" — 3:34
7. "Betty Page" — 3:38
8. "Damn This Love" — 4:28
9. "Life Is Life" — 6:30
10. "Waiting for You" — 6:06

== Personnel ==
- Rai Thistlethwayte – guitars, pianos and singer-songwriter
- Phil Stack – bass guitar and backing vocals
- Karl Robertson – drums and percussion
- Matt Smith – guitar

== Charts ==
Chart performance for Mousetrap Heart
Chart (2010)	Peak position
Australian Albums (ARIA)	14
