= When the Weather Is Fine =

When the Weather Is Fine may refer to:

- "When the Weather Is Fine" (song), a 2005 song by Thirsty Merc
- When the Weather Is Fine (TV series), a 2020 South Korean television series
