= When the Weather Is Fine (song) =

2005 single by Thirsty Merc

Single by Thirsty Merc

from the album Thirsty Merc
- B-side: "Baby Tell Me I'm the Only One"; "Crystal Striker"
- Released: 22 August 2005
- Length: 3:24
- Label: WEA
- Songwriter: Rai Thistlethwayte
- Producer: Lindsay Gravina

Thirsty Merc singles chronology
"In the Summertime" (2005)	"When the Weather Is Fine" (2005)	"20 Good Reasons" (2007)

"When the Weather Is Fine" is the fourth and final single released from Australian pop rock band Thirsty Merc's debut album, Thirsty Merc (2004). The song appears only on the 2005 re-packaged version of the album.

== Music video ==
The music video features Thirsty Merc playing the song in a theatre and there's water shallowly covering the stage (to ankle height) intercut with scenes from the audience where a young man and woman appear to be having relationship troubles, reflecting the lyrical content of the song.

== Track listing ==
Australian CD single

1. "When the Weather Is Fine" – 3:24
2. "Baby Tell Me I'm the Only One" – 3:25
3. "Crystal Striker" – 3:51
4. "Someday, Someday" (video)
5. "Wasting Time" (video)

== Charts ==
Chart (2005)	Peak position
Australia (ARIA)	46
