= Thirsty Merc (album) =

Studio album by Thirsty Merc
- Released: 16 August 2004
- Recorded: 2004
- Genre: Rock
- Length: 54:30
- Label: Warner Music Australia
- Producer: Lindsay Gravina

Thirsty Merc chronology
First Work (2003)	Thirsty Merc (2004)	Slideshows (2007)

Alternative cover
- Repackage cover (2005)

Singles from Thirsty Merc
- 1. "My Completeness" Released: 19 July 2004; 2. "Someday, Someday" Released: 22 November 2004; 3. "In the Summertime" Released: 11 April 2005; 4. "When the Weather Is Fine" Released: 22 August 2005

Thirsty Merc is the debut studio album release by Australian rock band Thirsty Merc released in 2004.

== History ==
In 2004, Lindsay Gravina, who has produced albums for The Living End and Magic Dirt produced the Thirsty Merc's first full-length eponymous album. The album included re-recorded versions of the songs "Katie Q," "Wasting Time," and "Emancipate Myself." From the album, there were three more singles released: "My Completeless", "Someday, Someday", and "In the Summertime" all to moderate radio and chart success. "In the Summertime" is used as the theme to Channel 10 reality television program Bondi Rescue.

In August 2005 the album was re-released with two extra tracks, "When The Weather Is Fine" which was also released as a single, and an alternate version of "Someday, Someday" and also a secret track "Joelene".

== Charts and certifications ==
The album reached a chart peak moderately at #15 on the Australian ARIA Charts, but its sales were steady enough to place it at #37 in the end of year chart for 2005, and #12 of Australian releases. the album spent over a year on the albums charts and sold over 120,000 copies, allowing platinum status and shyly missing out on double platinum by 20,000 sales.

== Singles ==
The album includes both of the group's singles from the First Work EP, "Wasting Time" and "Emancipate Myself" however, at the advice of producer Lindsay Gravina, both were re-recorded for the album release (which Gravina had previously also suggested for Australian punkabilly-rock band The Living End to do with their hits "Prisoners of Society" and "Second Solution" when producing their debut album also). The group then after recording Thirsty Merc but prior to releasing it, released "My Completeness." Following the album release, the singles "Someday, Someday" and "In the Summertime" were released. In 2005, the album was repackaged with the new song "When the Weather is Fine," which was also then released as a single.

== Track listings ==
All songs written by Rai Thistlethwayte, except where noted.

Original 2004 release

1. "My Completeness" (Thistlethwayte, Phil Stack) - 3:48
2. "Emancipate Myself" - 4:16
3. "Undivided Love" - 4:44
4. "I Wish Somebody Would Build a Bridge (So I Can Get Over Myself)" - 3:38
5. "In the Summertime" - 4:00
6. "Someday, Someday" - 4:29
7. "Hope" (Thistlethwayte, Stack) - 4:21
8. "Katie Q" - 3:54
9. "Baby Tell Me I'm the Only One" - 3:23
10. "Wasting Time" - 4:01
11. "Everything But You" - 3:34
12. "Claude Monet" - 3:47
13. "Like Snow" - 2:46

2005 repackage

1. "My Completeness"
2. "Emancipate Myself"
3. "Undivided Love"
4. "I Wish Somebody Would Build a Bridge (So I Can Get Over Myself)"
5. "In the Summertime"
6. "Someday, Someday"
7. "Hope"
8. "Katie Q"
9. "Baby Tell Me I'm the Only One"
10. "Wasting Time"
11. "Everything But You"
12. "Claude Monet"
13. "Like Snow"
14. "When the Weather Is Fine"
15. "Someday, Someday" (alternate version)

== Personnel ==
- Rai Thistlethwayte – guitars, pianos and singer-songwriter
- Phil Stack – bass guitar and backing vocals
- Karl Robertson – drums and percussion
- Matt Baker – guitars and backing vocals (tracks 1–13)
- Sean Carey – guitars and backing vocals (tracks 14–15)

== Charts ==
Chart performance for Thirsty Merc
Chart (2004)	Peak position
Australian Albums (ARIA)	15
New Zealand Albums (RMNZ)	29

== Certifications ==
Certifications for Thirsty Merc
Region	Certification	Certified units/sales
Australia (ARIA)	Platinum	70,000^{^}
^{^} Shipments figures based on certification alone.
