= Live on Stage (Monsieur Camembert album) =

Live album by Monsieur Camembert
- Released: 11 September 2001
- Recorded: 2001
- Genre: Jazz/World
- Length: 66:37
- Label: Monsieur Camembert

Monsieur Camembert chronology
Live @ The Basement (1999)	Live on Stage (2001)	Absynthe (2003)

Live on Stage is the second album by the Australian Gypsy fusion band Monsieur Camembert. At the ARIA Music Awards of 2002 it won the ARIA Award for Best World Music Album. Most of the tracks are from a live concert recorded for ABC Radio National. An expanded version, with four additional tracks, was released in November 2011 for Live on Stage's tenth anniversary.

== Reception ==
Live on Stage was praised by The Australian Jewish News' Daniel Feiller, who felt that as Monsieur Camembert's second album it "focuses more closely on the band’s own talented performers" especially the group's "heartfelt interpretations of Russian Gypsy standards, 'Choubi' and 'Dark Eyes'."

== Track listing ==
All arrangements by Monsieur Camembert

1. "Dark Eyes" (trad.) – 6:28
2. "Grine Kuzine" (trad.) – 2:49
3. "The Fat Lady" (Yaron Hallis) – 5:11
4. "Choubi" (trad.) – 2:59
5. "Elixir in C" (trad.) – 6:59
6. "Istanbul" (Kennedy / Simon) – 6:53
7. "Odessa Bulgarish" (trad.) – 5:01
8. "Avinu Malkeinu" (trad.) – 4:26
9. "Cliches" (Yaron Hallis) – 5:37
10. "Tchavolo Swing" (Dorado Schmitt) – 4:36
11. "Yiddish Medley" (trad.) – 5:21
12. "Sirba" (trad.) – 4:50
13. "Monti's Czardas" (Monti) – 5:25

== Personnel ==
Monsieur Camembert

- Edouard Bronson – clarinet, saxophone, flute, vocals
- Svetlana Bunic – accordion, vocals
- Julian Curwin – lead guitar, vocals
- Yarron Hallis – lead vocals, rhythm guitar
- Vladimir Khusid – trumpet, flugelhorn, vocals
- Mark Szeto – double bass

Additional musicians

- Mark Atkins – didjeridu
- Michael Lira – double bass, piano, vocals
