= Cosmo Cosmolino (band) =

Australian band

- Origin: Melbourne, Victoria, Australia
- Genre: gypsy folk / tango
- Years active: 1995–present
- Label: MGM
- Spinoff of: My Friend the Chocolate Cake
- Members: Judy Gunson; Andrea Keeble; Helen Mountfort; Sue Simpson; Dan Witton

Cosmo Cosmolino are a gypsy, folk and tango band, which formed in 1995 by Hope Csutoros on lead violin, Helen Mountfort on cello (both members of My Friend the Chocolate Cake) and Judy Gunson on lead vocals and piano accordion. They were joined by Andrea Keeble on violin and Dan Witton on double bass and vocals in 1998. Their debut album, Streetsweeper, was independently released in April 2000 and was followed by Nektár in December 2004, which was nominated for Best World Music Album at the ARIA Music Awards of 2005. Csutoros was replaced by Sue Simpson on violin in 2006. Their third album, Bel Air, appeared in August 2011.

== History ==
Cosmo Cosmolino were formed as a gypsy, folk and tango trio in Melbourne in 1995 by Hope Csutoros on lead violin, Helen Mountfort on cello (both members of My Friend the Chocolate Cake) and Judy Gunson on lead vocals and piano accordion. They are named for a book, Cosmo Cosmolino (1992), by Australian writer, Helen Garner, set in Melbourne. The trio later expanded to a quintet with Andrea Keeble on violin and Dan Witton on double bass and vocals; the five-piece first performed in 1998.

The group released their self-funded debut album, Streetsweeper, in April 2000. Evan Cater of AllMusic rated it at four-and-a-half stars out-of five and explained, "[it] features an impressive range of material, from the traditional and classical to the experimental and playful... [makes them] particularly well suited for the experimental 'nuevo tango' sound originally pioneered by Argentine composer Astor Piazzolla." He described, "Their repertoire, which consists primarily of original instrumental compositions interspersed with occasional vocal pieces and innovative arrangements of popular orchestral works, is a lively blend of tango, European gypsy music, and jazz-influenced improvisation."

Their second album, Nektár, was launched at The Famous Spiegeltent in December 2004. It was nominated for Best World Music Album at the ARIA Music Awards of 2005. The Age's correspondent caught their performance at Fitzroy Community Room in July 2005, "[their] sound requires a delicate dynamic balance and five pairs of keenly attuned ears. On Saturday night, the group's mainly original repertoire achieved this balance perfectly, each instrument rising and falling in carefully interlocking patterns that still left room for individual interpretation." Sean Doyle of Radio National's Daily Planet played two tracks: for Mountfort's "La Mort de Jezebel", he described, "Italianate, sweetly bittersweet piece which originally depicted elderly people dancing tenderly at Melbourne's Melbourne Club", and for Csutoros' title track, he observed, "overtly Hungarian 'gypsy', but not in the cornball corner: a celebration of the composer's Magyar cultural inheritance & also remembers her childhood trip to Hungary, where she witnessed her father embrace his mother, twenty years since he'd last seen her."

Csutoros left in 2006 and was replaced by Sue Simpson. They followed with Bel Air, launched in August 2011. LotL's reviewer felt, "[it] takes the listener on a ride of passion in all its glorious colours – heartfelt songs, bursts of wild virtuosic strings, soulful piano accordion, languid and lascivious laments grounded by infectious double bass grooves. Cosmo Cosmolino invites you to join them for a wild ride filled with laughter, tears, passion and mayhem." Lucky Oceans previewed the album on Daily Planet, "[it] continues the string and accordion Melbourne quintet's explorations of classical, tango, klezmer, jazz and Brazilian musics, all with an emotional, surging sound and forward-propelling rhythm." They toured Victoria from late July to early September 2011 in support of its release.

== Members ==
- Judy Gunson - lead vocals, Piano accordion
- Andrea Keeble - violin, vocals
- Helen Mountfort - cello
- Dan Witton - contrabass, vocals
- Sue Simpson - violin

Former members

- Hope Csutoros - lead violin
- David Abiuso - bass guitar

== Discography ==
=== Albums ===
List of albums
Title	Album details
Streetsweeper	Released: April 2000; Label: (CC001); Formats: CD
Nektár	Released: 2004; Label: (CC002); Formats: CD
Bel Air	Released: August 2011; Label: Planet Company/MGM (CC003); Formats: CD

== Awards and nominations ==
=== ARIA Music Awards ===
The ARIA Music Awards is an annual awards ceremony that recognises excellence, innovation, and achievement across all genres of Australian music. They commenced in 1987.

Year	Nominee / work	Award	Result	Ref.
2005	Nektar	Best World Music Album	Nominated	
