= Monsieur Camembert =

Australian musical group

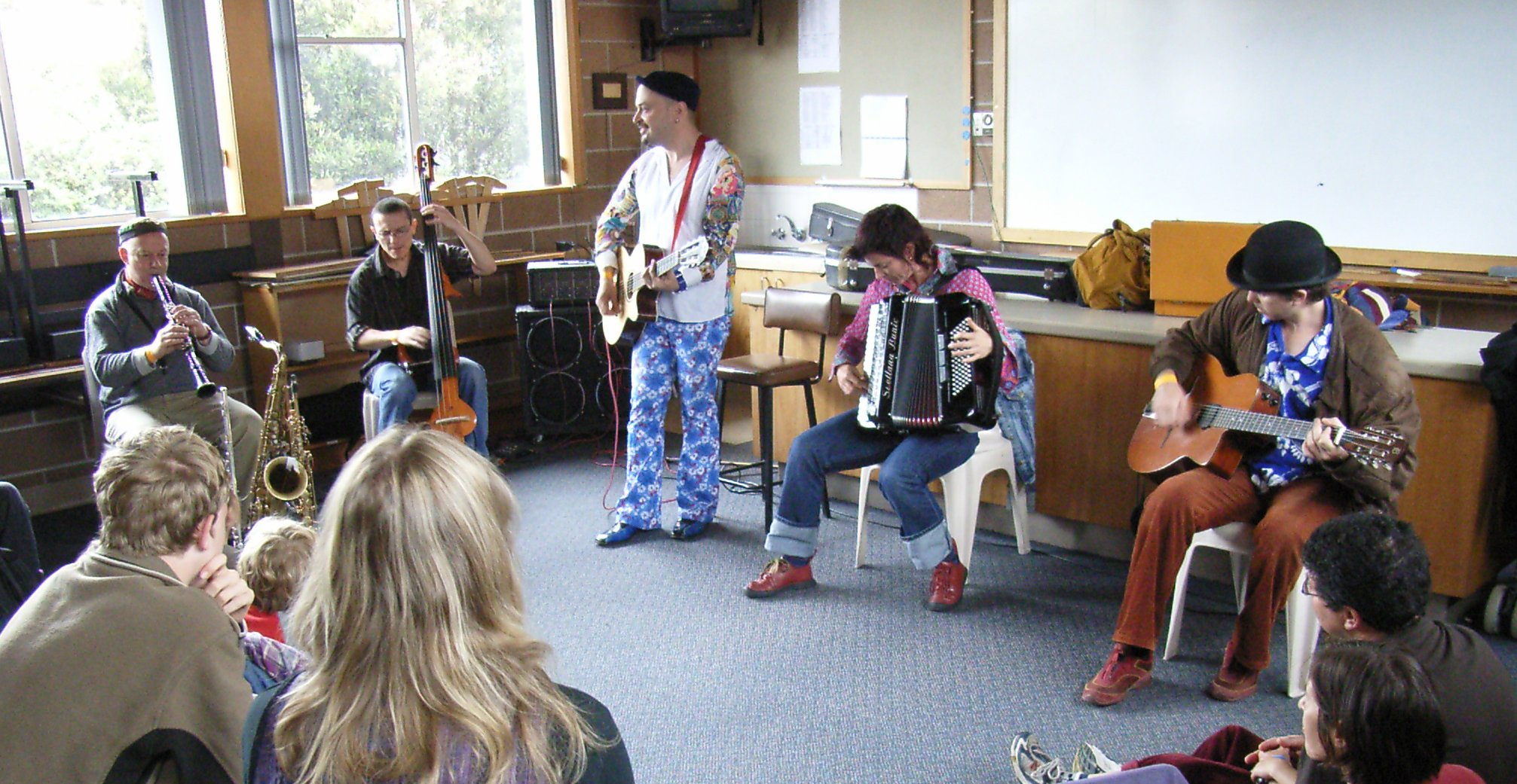
- Monsieur Camembert giving a workshop at the 2005 Cygnet Folk Festival

Background information
- Origin: Sydney, New South Wales, Australia
- Genres: Gypsy jazz, world
- Years active: 1999–present
- Labels: MGM Distribution
- Members: Yaron Hallis; Matt Ottignon; Edouard Bronson; Marcello Maio; Julian Curwin; Mark Harris
- Website: Official website

Monsieur Camembert are an Australian five-piece gypsy jazz fusion band formed in Sydney in 1997. They have won three ARIA Music Awards for Best World Music Album in 2002 for Live on Stage (released in 2001), in 2003 for Absynthe and in 2005 for Monsieur Camembert. The linguistic repertoire of Monsieur Camembert's music includes English, Russian, Hebrew and Yiddish.

== History ==
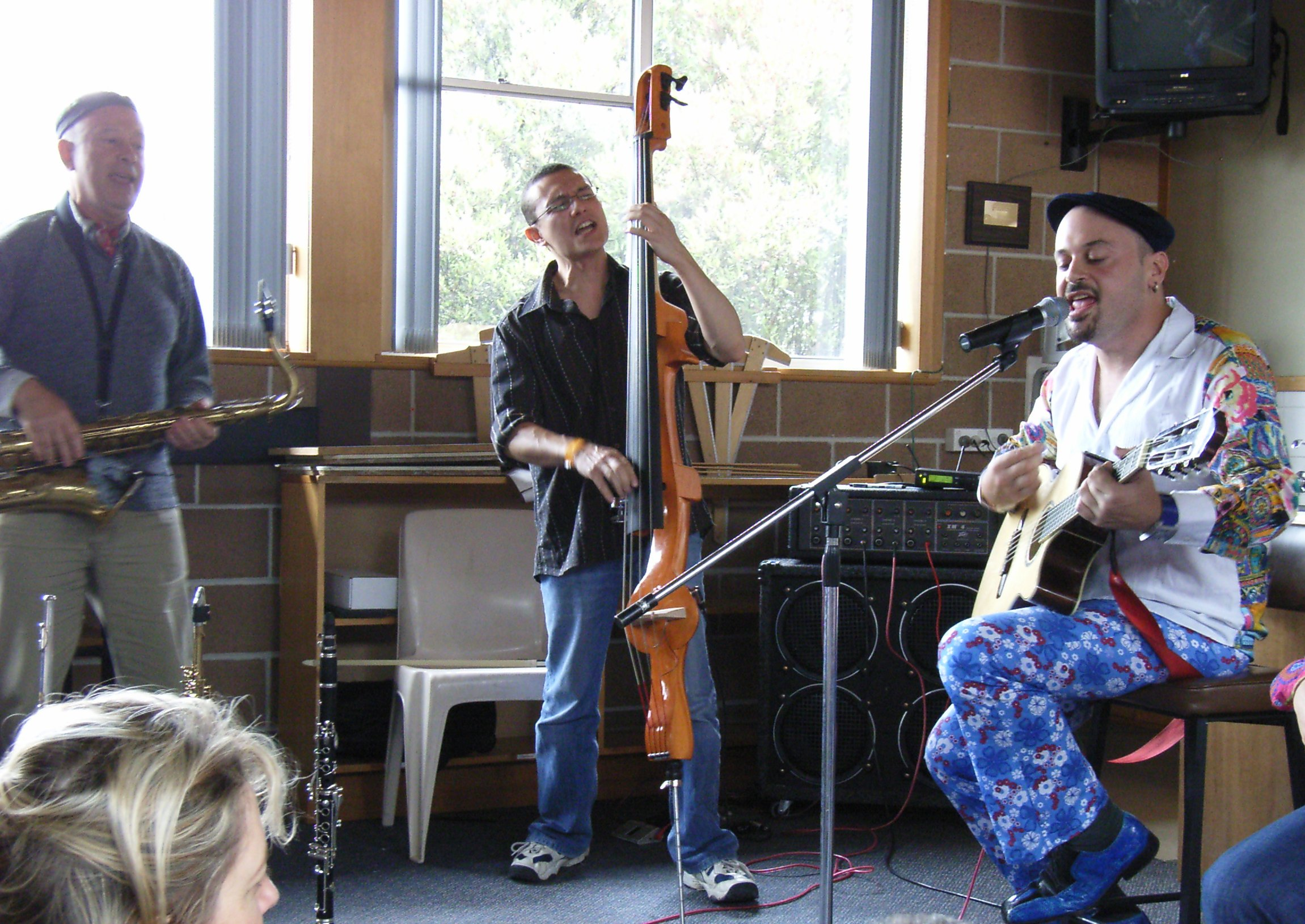
Members of Monsieur Camembert at Cygnet Festival 2005 (2)

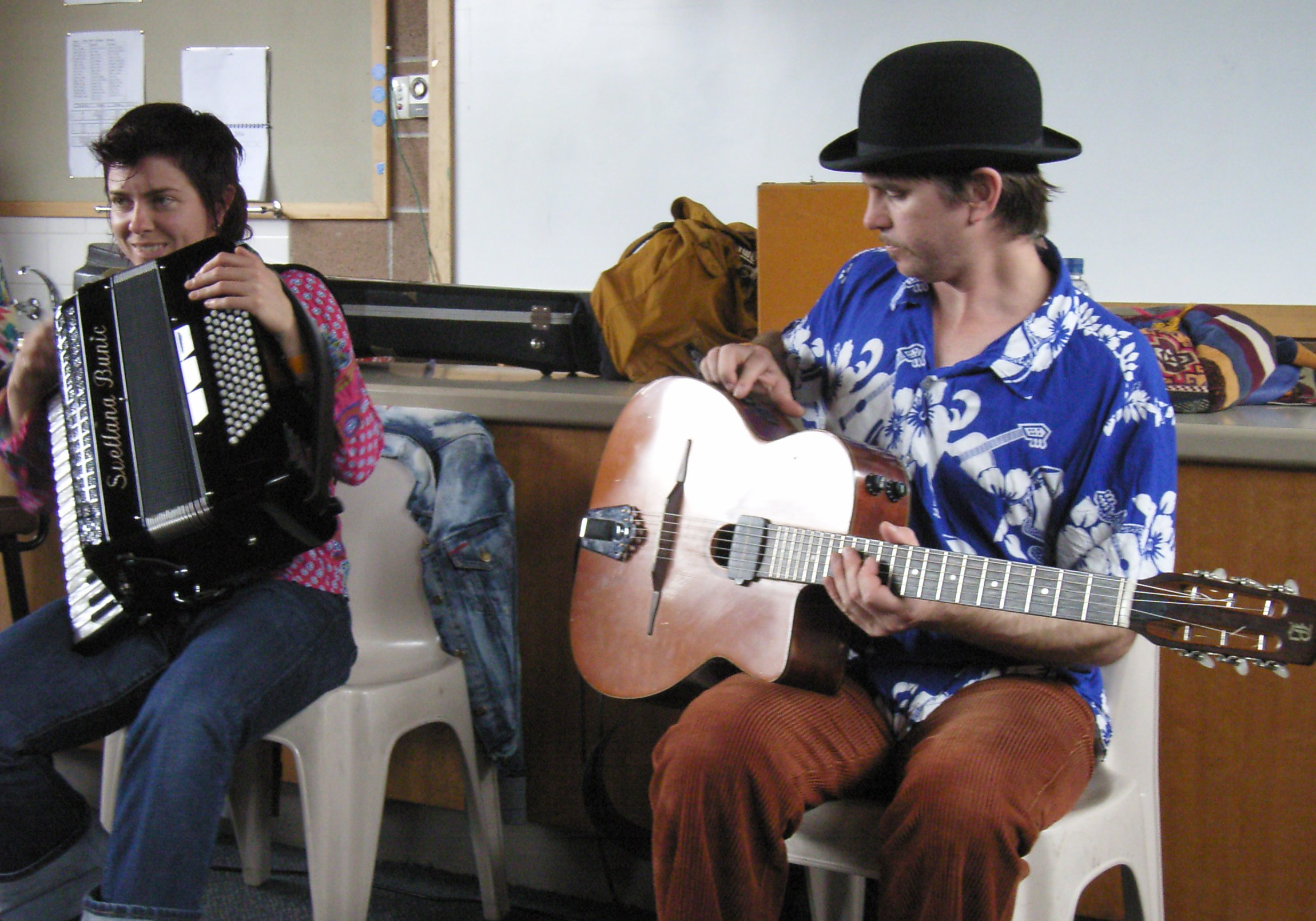
Members of Monsieur Camembert at Cygnet Festival 2005 (3)

Monsieur Camembert formed as a five-piece Gypsy fusion band in Sydney, Australia in 1997. Their first album, was the live release The Gypsy Hot Club Presents Monsieur Camembert, which featured Svetlana Bunic on accordion, Julian Curwin on lead guitar, Yaron Hallis on vocals and rhythm guitar, Michael Lira on double bass and Daniel Weltlinger on violin and was recorded at The Gypsy Hot Club. Released in 1999, it is also titled, Live @ The Basement and demonstrated their styles including Gypsy swing, Greek, Hungarian-Russian gypsy, klezmer, tango and original songs.

Their second album was also a live performance, Live on Stage which was released on 11 September 2001. Performing on the album were Mark Atkins on didgeridoo, Eddie Bronson on percussion, Bunic, Curwin, Shenton Gregory on violin, Hallis and Mark Szeto on bass.

They have won three ARIA Music Awards for Best World Music Album (2002, 2003, 2005). The linguistic repertoire of Monsieur Camembert's music includes English, Russian, Romani, Hebrew and Yiddish.

== Band members ==
As of 2009:

- Yaron Hallis (Lead Vocals/Rhythm Guitar)
- Matt Ottignon/Edouard Bronson (Saxes/Clarinet/Flute)
- Marcello Maio (Accordion/Piano)
- Julian Curwin (Lead Guitar)
- Mark Harris (Double Bass/Vocals)

Guest artists including:

- Shenzo Gregorio (Violin)
- Vladimir Khusid (Trumpet/Flugelhorn)
- Anatoli Torjinski (5 String Cello/Balalaika)
- Daniel Weltlinger (Violin)
- Svetlana Bunic (Accordion)
- Jim Pennell (Lead Guitar)
- Stuart Vandegraaf (Saxes/Clarinet/Flute)

== Discography ==
=== Albums ===
List of albums
Title	Album details
Live @ The Basement	Released: August 1999; Label: Monsieur Camembert (CAM001); Formats: CD
Live on Stage	Released: September 2001; Label: Monsieur Camembert (CAM002); Formats: CD
Absynthe	Released: 2003; Label: Monsieur Camembert (CAM003); Formats: CD
Monsieur Camembert	Released: March 2005; Label: Monsieur Camembert (CAM 004); Formats: 2×CD, digital
Famous Blue Cheese - the Leonard Cohen Show	Released: June 2007; Label: Monsieur Camembert (CAM 005); Formats: 2×CD, digital

== Awards and nominations ==
=== ARIA Music Awards ===
The ARIA Music Awards is an annual awards ceremony that recognises excellence, innovation, and achievement across all genres of Australian music. They commenced in 1987.

Year	Nominee / work	Award	Result	Ref.
2002	Live on Stage	Best World Music Album	Won	
2003	Absynthe	Best World Music Album	Won	
2005	Monsieur Camembert	Best World Music Album	Won	
2007	Famous Blue Cheese	Best Original Soundtrack, Cast or Show Album	Nominated	
