= In the Summertime (Thirsty Merc song) =

2005 single by Thirsty Merc

Single by Thirsty Merc

from the album Thirsty Merc
- B-side: "Magic Kinetic"; "My Completeness" (live); "Someday, Someday" (live)
- Released: 11 April 2005
- Length: 3:40
- Label: Warner Music Australia
- Songwriter: Rai Thistlethwayte
- Producer: Lindsay Gravina

Thirsty Merc singles chronology
"Someday, Someday" (2004)	"In the Summertime" (2005)	"When the Weather Is Fine" (2005)

"In the Summertime" is a song by Australian rock group Thirsty Merc, released on 11 April 2005 as the third single from the band's self-titled debut album (2004). The track is a tribute to the Australian summer and is a reflection of the laidback Aussie lifestyle. The song reached number 43 on the Australian ARIA Singles Chart and is used as the theme song for the Australian television program Bondi Rescue. It was the band's first song to chart in New Zealand, where it peaked at number 12. The Adrian Van De Velde–directed music video was nominated for Best Video at the ARIA Music Awards of 2005.

== Track listing ==
Australian CD single

1. "In the Summertime"
2. "Magic Kinetic"
3. "My Completeness" (live)
4. "Someday, Someday" (live)

== Charts ==
Chart (2005)	Peak position
Australia (ARIA)	43
New Zealand (Recorded Music NZ)	12

== Certifications ==
Region	Certification	Certified units/sales
New Zealand (RMNZ)	Platinum	30,000^{‡}
^{‡} Sales+streaming figures based on certification alone.
