= Karl Robertson =

Australian musician

Karl Robertson was the former drummer for Australian rock group Thirsty Merc. As a founding member from 2002, he has performed on all their releases from First Work in September 2003 to the single "The Whole World Reminds Me of You" in December 2008.

== Biography ==
Karl Robertson as drummer formed the band Drown in 1996 in Dubbo, New South Wales with Matthew Baker on guitar, Peter Jamieson on vocals, and Phil Stack on bass guitar. By 1998 Baker, Jamieson and Stack had split to form Twenty Two in Dubbo and then moved to Sydney. Between 1998 and 2002 Karl attended Newcastle University and formed a band called Fungus with Andrew Murdoch on bass, vocals and keyboard and David Stanke on guitar and vocals. Fungus recorded an album called Eddy as I'll rever be on Davids brothers macintosh laptop. The album includes covers and original tracks by David called "Fast Train" and "My Destiny". In 2002, Baker and Stack had returned to Dubbo and with Robertson they were joined by Rai Thistlethwayte on vocals and guitar to form Thirsty which was soon renamed Thirsty Merc and moved to Sydney from 2003. Karl Robertson also has a brother called David Robertson currently attending Newcastle University. "DJ" as he is known to his friends plays the piano and guitar. David is known for his hit band 'Shibuya' with the single 'Your Song', written and performed by Dave. Karl often attributes his passion for music to his younger brother DJ, despite being older. Later, Robertson retired from performing.
