= 20 Good Reasons =

2007 single by Thirsty Merc

Single by Thirsty Merc

from the album Slideshows
- Released: March 24, 2007
- Length: 3:49
- Label: Warner Music Group
- Songwriter: Rai Thistlethwayte
- Producer: Lindsay Gravina

Thirsty Merc singles chronology
"When the Weather Is Fine" (2005)	"20 Good Reasons" (2007)	"The Hard Way" (2007)

"20 Good Reasons" was the first single from Australian pop rock band Thirsty Merc's second album, Slideshows (2007). It was released on 17 March 2007 and is the band's highest-charting single, reaching number four on the Australian Singles Chart and number 17 on the New Zealand Singles Chart. The song was nominated for Song of the Year at the APRA Music Awards of 2008. The single was also the number-one most added track to radio across Australia in March 2007.

== Music video ==
The music video for "20 Good Reasons" features the band playing in what appears to be a gritty warehouse of some kind. Intercut with the band scenes, the clip features a few couples going through various relationship troubles, echoing the story told by the song. The music video was a MySpace feature video for Australian visitors in April 2007 in preparation and for promotion of the forthcoming full-length album Slideshows. Thistlethwayte wrote the song when arriving in New York City once. He notes he did not write it asking a question about what love or relationships are about, however wrote it saying as a statement, but with the question as to why relationships are often troubled or "lost within all the hysteria".

== Lost promotion ==
The song was used in the Seven Network's advertising for the hit television series, Lost—specifically its third season, which aired in 2007.

== Track listing ==
1. "20 Good Reasons"
2. "Blood & Guts"
3. "Midnight Sun"

== Charts ==
Weekly chart performance for "20 Good Reasons"
Chart (2007)	Peak position
Australia (ARIA)	4
New Zealand (Recorded Music NZ)	17

== Certifications ==
Certifications for "20 Good Reasons"
Region	Certification	Certified units/sales
Australia (ARIA)	Gold	35,000^{^}
New Zealand (RMNZ)	Gold	15,000^{‡}
^{^} Shipments figures based on certification alone.^{‡} Sales+streaming figures based on certification alone.
