= Slideshows (album) =

Studio album by Thirsty Merc
- Released: 21 April 2007
- Recorded: 2006–2007
- Genre: Rock
- Label: Warner
- Producer: Lindsay Gravina

Thirsty Merc chronology
Thirsty Merc (2004)	Slideshows (2007)	Mousetrap Heart (2010)

Singles from Thirsty Merc
- 1. "20 Good Reasons" Released: 17 March 2007; 2. "The Hard Way" Released: 15 September 2007; 3. "Those Eyes" Released: 8 December 2007; 4. "Homesick" Released: 3 May 2008

Slideshows is the second studio album release by Australian rock band Thirsty Merc. It was released on 21 April 2007, through Warner Music Australia. Six singles were released from the album. The first single "20 Good Reasons", became Thirsty Merc's first single to peak in the Top 10 on the Australian Singles Chart. The second single from the album was "The Hard Way", followed by "Those Eyes", which was released as a digital download in December 2007, only later to be released on CD in April 2008. "Homesick" was released as the fourth single digitally, making available for the first time a single mix of the track.

Slideshows marks the first album with guitarist Sean Carey, since joining the band just after the first studio album's release. As with the band's first album, Slideshows is produced by Lindsay Gravina and engineered by Rob Long. The album is currently featured on NineMSN, with all of its songs available for streaming download.

== Cover art ==
The cover art is a high contrast silhouetted Polaroid photo of the band standing in a line (from left to right: Rai Thistlethwayte, Sean Carey, Phil Stack and Karl Robertson) but you cannot see their faces. The silhouettes are dark brown against an amber background. The whole image is distressed, giving it an "aged" look. The logo for Thirsty Merc is different from the debut EP and studio album (which were both the same as one another), in a Cooper type font with some graphic fill-art above. As the photos were from a polaroid camera (or at least made to look like they were) the polaroid white border and image artifacts found in a polaroid image are not trimmed but featured on the images throughout and on the cover, further providing a "distressed" feel. The cover of the rear of the album is a photo of the band and, alike to the front cover, in high contrast, however not as high and the image is not silhouetted, so you can see the band member's faces. The inside slip maintains the colours throughout, remaining in brown, amber and general autumn colours. The single "20 Good Reasons" uses the same basic colours, logo and a similar high contrast image, consistent with the album.

== Songs ==
The album includes twelve songs, and they are, according to the band, more mature than those featured on their debut album. The first song publicly and widely released was "The Vision", in January 2007 on the band's official website, followed by "20 Good Reasons" a few weeks later, which was then announced and released as the album's first single. The band has since removed "The Vision" from their MySpace page, replacing it with "The Hard Way", which has been confirmed as the second single from the album.

== Track listing ==
Originally, there were two distinct versions of the album's track listing advertised, one from the band's own website and another from several other sources. The main difference between the two versions of the track listing was that the song "The Whole World Reminds Me of You" was not included on the listing on the band's own website. As this is the only song that uses the word "fuck", it's a possibility this track listing was one that was proposed to avoid a language warning label. Otherwise, the only difference was the track sequence. Notably, both versions began with "She's All I Got" and end with "Homesick." The version released was the iTunes and Warner Music version, meanwhile the track listing on the band's own website remains as it originally was; however, no versions in stores or online contain the track listing from their site.

All songs written by Rai Thistlethwayte.

1. "She's All I Got" — 4:13
2. "20 Good Reasons" — 3:49
3. "The Hard Way" — 4:24
4. "The Whole World Reminds Me of You" — 4:38
5. "Those Eyes" — 4:43
6. "The Vision" — 4:24
7. "Crying in Denial" — 4:42
8. "Now or Never" — 4:34
9. "Hey Jacinta" — 4:26
10. "She's My Brother" — 3:49
11. "Kaleidoscope" — 3:57
12. "Homesick" — 4:28

=== Bonus tracks ===
1. "20 Good Reasons" (Acoustic) — 4:22
- iTunes only pre-order inclusions:
1. "The Whole World Reminds Me of You" (Acoustic)
2. "She's All I Got" (Acoustic)
3. "20 Good Reasons" (Video)
4. Slideshows (Digital booklet)

== Personnel ==
- Rai Thistlethwayte – guitars, pianos and singer-songwriter
- Phil Stack – bass guitar and backing vocals
- Karl Robertson – drums and percussion
- Sean Carey – guitars and backing vocals

== Charts ==
Chart performance for Slideshows
Chart (2007)	Peak position
Australian Albums (ARIA)	4
New Zealand Albums (RMNZ)	38

== Certifications ==
Certifications for Slideshows
Region	Certification	Certified units/sales
Australia (ARIA)	Gold	35,000^{^}
^{^} Shipments figures based on certification alone.
