= Le Tuan Hung =

Lê Tuấn Hùng (born 1960 in Vietnam) is an Australian-Vietnamese composer, performer, and musicologist. He is a multi-instrumentalist with a strong background in Vietnamese traditional music and Western classical music. Known as a skilled performer of the đàn tranh, a Vietnamese zither, he plays traditional Vietnamese music as well as cross-cultural and experimental music. His compositions have been created for a wide range of instruments, ensembles and media. A number of his compositions combine Vietnamese instruments with Indonesian and European Renaissance and Medieval instruments.

He holds a Bachelor of Music degree from the University of Melbourne and a Ph.D. in Music from Monash University. He is married to Dang Kim Hien (Ðặng Kim Hiền).

== Bibliography ==
- Le, Tuan Hung. "Mindfulness of hearing : hearing places from a non-western perspective" in Hearing Places : Sound, Place, Time and Culture. Edited by Ros Bandt, Michelle Duffy and Dolly MacKinnon. Newcastle: Cambridge Scholars Publishing, 2007. ISBN 9781847182555
- Le, Tuan Hung. Dan Tranh Music of Vietnam : Traditions and Innovations. Melbourne, Tokyo : Australia Asia Foundation, 1998. ISBN 0958534306 (hard back); ISBN 0958534314 (paperback)
- Le, Tuan Hung. "Vietnamese Traditions" in Currency Companion to Music and Dance in Australia. General editors: John Whiteoak and Aline Scott-Maxwell. Sydney: Currency House in association with Currency Press, 2003. ISBN 0958121311
- Le, Tuan Hung. "Vietnamese Music" in Oxford Companion to Australian Music. Edited by Warren Bebbington. Melbourne: Oxford University Press, 1997. ISBN 0195534328
- Le, Tuan Hung. "Popular music of Vietnam" in Music and Popular Culture: Asia and Australia : Unit Study Guide. Clayton, Vic.: Monash Open Learning, 1995.
- Le, Tuan Hung. "The Dynamics of Change in Hue and Tai Tu Music between 1890 and 1990" in Music-cultures in Contact : Convergences and Collisions. Edited by Margaret J. Kartomi and Stephen Blum. Sydney : Currency Press, 1994. ISBN 0868193658
- Le, Tuan Hung."Composition and Performing Process in Hue and Southern Chamber Music" in Nhac Viet Journal of Vietnamese Music, 1992, 1(2):43-60.
- Le, Tuan Hung."Music and Politics: A Socio-Political Interpretation of Significant Aspects of Compositions for the Zither Dan Tranh in South Vietnam since 1975" in New Perspectives on Vietnamese Music. Edited by Phong T. Nguyen. [New Haven, Ct.] : Yale Center for International and Area Studies, 1992.

== Discography ==
=== Albums ===
List of albums
Title	Details
Best Seats in the House!	Released: 1992; Label: NMA; Formats: CD
Quivering String	Released: 1992; Label: Move Record; Formats: CD
Musical Transfiguration : a Journey across Vietnamese Soundscapes	Released: 1993; Label: Move Record; Formats: CD
Landscapes of Time: Contemporary Sound Art of Vietnam	Released: 1996; Label: Move Record; Formats: CD
Echoes of Ancestral Voices : Traditional Music of Vietnam	Released: 1997; Label: Move Record; Formats: CD
Scent of time : Australian Compositions for Asian Instruments and Voices	Released: 2002; Label: Move Record; Formats: CD
On the Wings of a Butterfly	Released: 2005; Label: Move Record; Formats: CD

== Awards and nominations ==
=== ARIA Music Awards ===
The ARIA Music Awards is an annual awards ceremony that recognises excellence, innovation, and achievement across all genres of Australian music. They commenced in 1987.

Year	Nominee / work	Award	Result	Ref.
2005	On the Wings of a Butterfly	Best World Music Album	Nominated	
