= Thirsty Merc =

Australian pop rock band

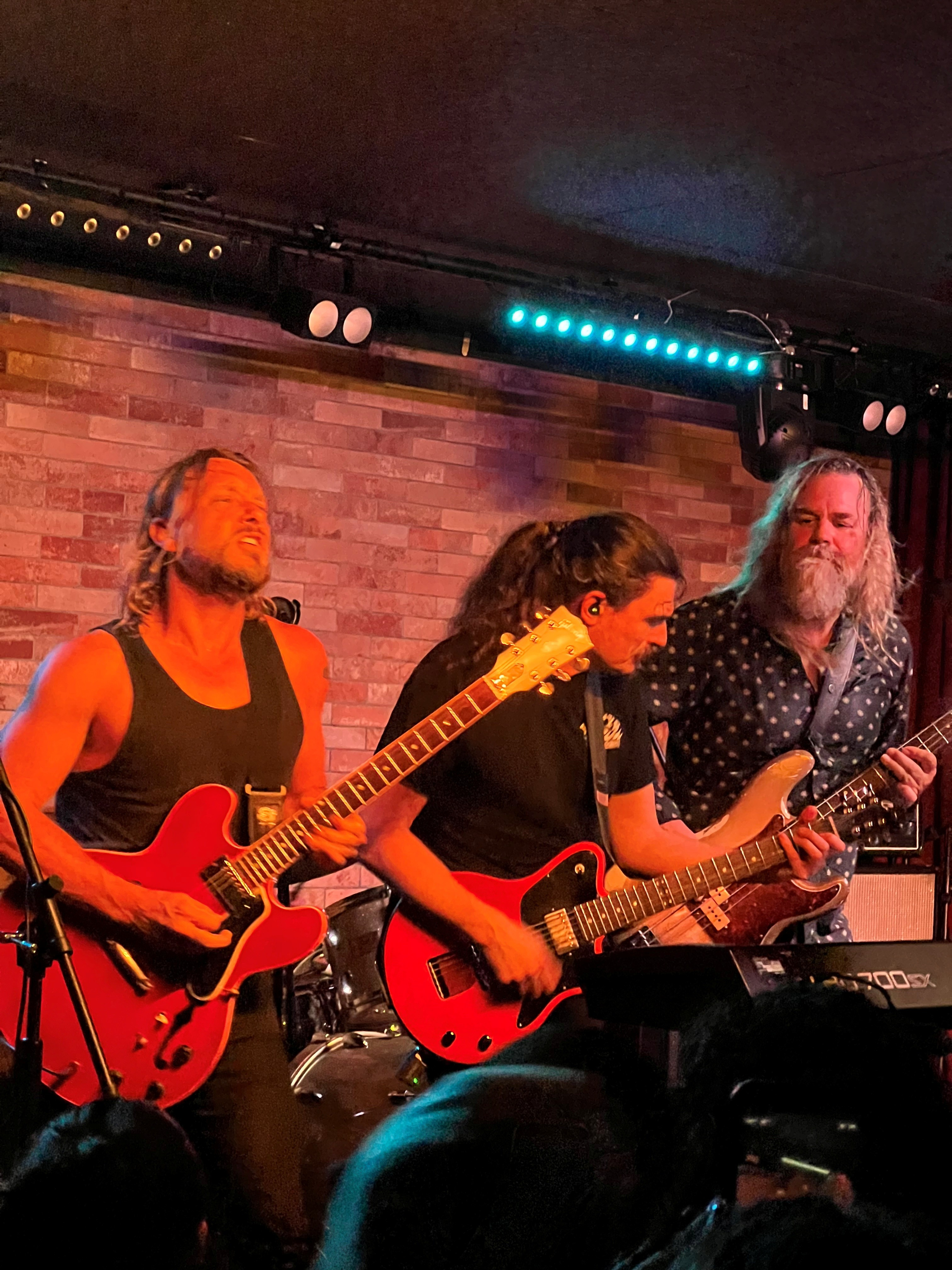
- Thirsty Merc performing at Burleigh Town Hotel, 3 May 2026

Background information
- Origin: Sydney, Australia
- Genre: Pop rock
- Years active: 2002–present
- Labels: Don't, Warner
- Members: Rai Thistlethwayte; Phil Stack; Matt Smith
- Past members: Matt Baker; Sean Carey; Karl Robertson
- Website: thirstymerc.com

Thirsty Merc are an Australian pop rock band, formed in 2002 by Rai Thistlethwayte, Phil Stack (bass guitar), Karl Robertson (drums), and Matthew Baker (guitar). In 2004, Baker was replaced by Sean Carey, who was, in turn, replaced by Matt Smith in 2010. Thirsty Merc have released one extended play, First Work (September 2003), and six studio albums: Thirsty Merc (August 2004), Slideshows (April 2007), Mousetrap Heart (June 2010), Acoustic Anniversary Album (September 2014), Shifting Gears (September 2015), and Celebration (June 2022). As of 2016, the band have sold over 200,000 albums and have been nominated for four ARIA Music Awards.

A car accident on 22 September 2015 at Streatham, Victoria during a Thirsty Merc tour killed the band's stage manager and injured drummer Mick Skelton.

== History ==
Three of the founding members of Thirsty Merc—Matthew Baker, Karl Robertson, and Phil Stack—had played together in various bands in Dubbo, a regional New South Wales city. In 1996, Drown was formed with Baker on guitar, Robertson on drums, Peter Jamieson on vocals, and Stack on bass guitar. By 1998 Baker, Jamieson and Stack had split to form Twenty Two and then moved to Sydney. In 2002, Baker and Stack returned to Dubbo where Rai Thistlethwayte, from Sydney, as lead singer (later also on guitar and keyboards) and Stack worked as a live jazz duo and session musicians. They were joined by Baker and Robertson, and formed a pop rock band, initially called Thirsty; soon after they moved to Sydney and were renamed, Thirsty Merc. The band's name came from Thistlethwayte's 1979 Mercedes-Benz 280SEL, which was a gas-guzzler.

In October 2006 Thistlethwayte described his jazz and R&B background to MusicFix and the band's sound as "rock Sinatra" where "[t]he outlook, I guess, is about being a young person in today's society ... being an Australian in an American-ised, Britain-ised kind of world, where you're trying to stay true to yourself". Baker added "We contrived to make it not contrived ... Rai was all for originality in his own vision and so were we".

=== 2003: First Work ===
Thirsty Merc's first extended play, First Work, was released on 8 September 2003 by the band's own label, Don't Music and was distributed by Warner Music Australia. The five-track CD was independently recorded during downtime at a studio where Thistlethwayte worked. The EP reached the top 100 on the ARIA Singles Chart; and its lead single, "Wasting Time", achieved radio airplay on national radio stations, Triple J and Nova. The self-funded music video for the single was broadcast on Channel [V], and became the 'ripe clip of the week'. At the time of recording the EP they were without a label. After extensive gigging around Sydney's pubs, representatives from Warner had signed the band in June 2003, for the release of the EP and the follow-up single, "Emancipate Myself", which was a reworked version of the EP track. It was issued in April 2004 and The Age's Andrew Murfett declared that "this bitter tirade wrapped in melodic hooks has become one of the biggest local radio successes of the year".

=== 2004: Self-Titled Debut Studio Album ===
On 16 August 2004 Thirsty Merc issued their debut studio album, the self-titled, Thirsty Merc, which was co-produced by the group with Lindsay Gravina (The Living End, Magic Dirt). Also that month, prior to a national tour in support of its release, Baker left and was replaced on guitar by Sean Carey (ex-Midnight Swim), whom they had met when playing a support slot to his group at a Kings Cross venue, Club 77. The album spent 48 weeks on the ARIA Albums Chart Top 50, peaking at No. 15, and launched the band in the Australian mainstream. dB Magazine's Kelly Parish observed "[e]ven though the band's sound is predominantly rock, it has been influenced by more traditional flavours ... they have developed a very wide audience which embraces both the alternative and mainstream camps". Thirsty Merc reached No. 29 on New Zealand's RIANZ Albums Chart. It was recorded and mixed on 2 inch tape, and then further mixed by Gravina at his Birdland Studios.

Five singles were released from Thirsty Merc: "Emancipate Myself", "My Completeness", "Someday, Someday" , "In the Summertime", and "When the Weather Is Fine". All five appeared in the ARIA Singles Chart top 50. Of these singles only "In the Summertime" reached the top 50 in New Zealand, where it peaked at No. 12. In June 2005 Billboard's Christie Eliezer felt the album showed "eclectic rock-, classical- and jazz-influenced pop [that] appealed to Australian radio programmers". The album was due for United States and European release in early 2006 on Atlantic Records.

"In the Summertime" was nominated at the ARIA Music Awards of 2005 for "Best Video", while "Someday, Someday" was nominated for "Single of the Year", "Best Group", and "Best Pop Release". At the ceremony in October, the group performed "Someday, Someday". In 2006 Carey described the group's style to Jet Magazine, it was "Just be yourself" and "about being young and living in Australia. We’re not trying to be 50 Cent or anything, we’re all just boys from the country, just trying to move into the city and make our way". He listed Evermore, Crowded House, Foo Fighters and Cold Chisel as his favourite bands. In February 2007 they supported Ozzy Osbourne on the Australian leg of his national tour.

=== 2007: Slideshows ===
Thirsty Merc's second album, Slideshows, was issued on 21 April 2007 via Warner Music Australia. It became the band's most successful release yet, peaking at No. 4 in Australia, and number 38 in New Zealand. To support the release of Slideshows, Thirsty Merc toured Australia, playing an album tour in theatres nationally and then various regional tours, the biggest of which had 38 shows booked across seven weeks. The album's first single, "20 Good Reasons", reached No. 4 in Australia and No. 17 in New Zealand. In June they supported Evermore on a tour of New Zealand, showcasing their "unique blend of pop rock dance-able balladry". The next three singles appeared in the top 100 in Australia, "The Hard Way", "Those Eyes", and "Homesick".

The band's main songwriter, Thistlethwayte, inadvertently wrote a "break-up album", which The Sydney Morning Herald's Brett Winterford noted was unusual, "that the articulate and intelligent 27-year-old has strung together 12 such stock-standard, radio-friendly songs about broken hearts". Thistlethwayte described his influences: "Jazz taught me about spontaneity ... Central to jazz is improvisation. It's also great to get that knowledge of theory, an understanding of the geeky side of music" and writing advertising jingles had shown him how to "do a lot of things in differing genres and recording styles—but had to try to be authentic about it". After writing the tracks, the other members "choose the songs that had the ultimate emotional impact".

=== 2010: Mousetrap Heart ===
On 14 January 2010, Thirsty Merc announced that Carey had left the band and was replaced on guitar by Matt Smith, from afrobeat and reggae band, The Strides. Carey wanted to work as a record producer and spend more time with his wife. On 18 June 2010 Thirsty Merc released their third album, Mousetrap Heart, which was recorded mostly in Los Angeles with Matt Wallace co-producing, while two tracks were produced in Melbourne with Gravina. Bernard Zuel of The Sydney Morning Herald opined that "we buy, or actively avoid, songs that excite a response in us but radio wants songs that fit in, that don't provoke strong responses, that offend the fewest people ... this [album] is a collection of extremely professional, well-considered, carefully targeted songs whose key performance indicators are ticked off one by one in a manner so efficient you suspect band meetings must have an agenda, notes secretary and double-cream biscuits for elevenses".

The band toured nationally in July 2010 to support the album, while its lead single, the title track, had appeared in May and charted in the Top 30 on the ARIA Singles Chart. The second single, "Tommy and Krista", was released in September, which peaked at No. 10 in New Zealand. Another single, "All My Life", was featured in the promotional clips for the 2010 AFL grand final. Its music video was directed by Adrian Van de Velde and was shot in early October in Bangkok, Thailand. The narrative is a 'heroic love' set on a local military base and features Russian model-actress Maria Mazikova, together with 50 Thai army troops, an Iroquois helicopter, and a Chinook helicopter. In November Lip Magazine's Shannon Andreucci reviewed a live gig, "[they] are certainly no Pixies, Beatles or Sex Pistols. They're not breaking any rules or boundaries in the revolutionary world of rock music. In fact they are perfectly happy and capable of playing within the parameters of radio friendly and commercially safe pop rock. But one thing is for sure; they go the extra mile in giving a charmingly refined and hearty live performance and that in itself should be commended".

=== 2014-2021: Acoustic Anniversary Album, Shifting Gears and Live! ===
In September 2014, the group released Acoustic Anniversary Album (AAA) giving their back catalogue the acoustic treatment.

Following a successful crowd funding campaign in 2015, Thirsty Merc recorded their fourth studio album, Shifting Gears. The single "The Good Life'"was nominated for 'Rock Work of the Year' at the APRA Music Awards of 2017.

In 2017 two performances at the Gasometer Hotel in Collingwood was recorded and released in October 2019.

=== 2022: Celebration ===
On 30 May 2022 Thirsty Merc announced on their official instagram page they will release their next studio album, Celebration, on 17 June 2022. This will be accompanied with a national tour, Celebration 2022, taking place between July and September of the same year. The album features reimagined covers of well known Australian songs from different decades.

== Members ==
Current members

- Rai Thistlethwayte – lead vocals, rhythm guitar, piano, keyboards (2002–present)
- Phil Stack – bass guitar, double bass, backing vocals (2002–present)
- Matt Smith – lead guitar (2010–present)

Former members

- Matt Baker – lead guitar, backing vocals (2002–2004)
- Sean Carey – lead guitar, backing vocals (2004–2009)
- Karl Robertson – drums, percussion (2002–2014)

Touring drummers

- Mick Skelton – drums (2014–present)
- Tim Firth - drums (2017-present)
- Pete Drummond - drums (2015-present)

== Discography ==
=== Studio albums ===
List of studio albums, with selected chart positions and certifications
Title	Album details	Peak chart positions		Certifications (sales thresholds)
Title	Album details	AUS	NZ	Certifications (sales thresholds)
Thirsty Merc	Released: 16 August 2004; Label: Warner Music Australia (5046740052); Formats: CD, download	15	29	ARIA: Platinum
Slideshows	Released: 21 April 2007; Label: Warner Music Australia (5144204302); Formats: CD, download	4	38	ARIA: Gold
Mousetrap Heart	Released: 18 June 2010; Label: Warner Music Australia (5186591662); Formats: CD, download	14	—	
Acoustic Anniversary Album (AAA)	Released: 5 September 2014; Lebel: MGM Distribution (TM10); Formats: CD, download	—	—	
Shifting Gears	Released: 4 September 2015; Label: MGM Distribution (TM11); Formats: CD, download	68	—	
Celebration	Released: 17 June 2022; Label: MGM Distribution; Formats: CD, download	—	—	
"—" denotes a recording that did not chart or was not released in that territory.

=== Live albums ===
List of live albums, with selected details
Title	Details
Live!	Released: 4 October 2019; Label: Thirsty Merc; Format: download

=== Extended plays (EP's) ===
List of extended plays, with selected chart positions
Title	Album details	Peak chart positions
Title	Album details	AUS
First Work	Released: 8 September 2003; Label: Don't Music; Formats: CD	95

=== Singles ===
List of singles, with selected chart positions and certifications, showing year released and album name
Title	Year	Peak chart positions		Certifications	Album
Title	Year	AUS	NZ	Certifications	Album
"Wasting Time"	2003	95	—		First Work
"Emancipate Myself"	2004	37	—		Thirsty Merc
"My Completeness"	2004	26	34		Thirsty Merc
"Someday, Someday"	2004	19	—		Thirsty Merc
"In the Summertime"	2004	43	12	RMNZ: Platinum	Thirsty Merc
"When the Weather Is Fine"	2005	46	—		Thirsty Merc
"20 Good Reasons"	2007	4	17	ARIA: Gold; RMNZ: Gold	Slideshows
"The Hard Way"	2007	63	—		Slideshows
"Those Eyes"	2007	—	—		Slideshows
"Homesick"	2008	—	—		Slideshows
"Mousetrap Heart"	2010	30	—		Mousetrap Heart
"Tommy and Krista"	2010	—	10	RMNZ: 2× Platinum	Mousetrap Heart
"All My Life"	2010	80	—		Mousetrap Heart
"The Good Life"	2015	—	—		Shifting Gears
"The Grind"	2016	—	—		Shifting Gears
"As the Days Go By"	2022	—	—		Celebration
"—" denotes a recording that did not chart or was not released in that territory.

== Awards and nominations ==
=== APRA Music Awards ===
The APRA Awards are presented annually from 1982 by the Australasian Performing Right Association (APRA).

Year	Nominee / work	Award	Result
2006	"Someday, Someday" (Rai Thistlethwayte) – Thirsty Merc	Most Played Australian Work	Nominated
2008	"20 Good Reasons" (Rai Thistlethwayte) – Thirsty Merc	Song of the Year	Nominated
2008	"20 Good Reasons" (Rai Thistlethwayte) – Thirsty Merc	Most Played Australian Work	Nominated
2017	"The Good Life" (Jon Hume, Rai Thistlethwayte) – Thirsty Merc	Rock Work of the Year	Nominated

=== ARIA Music Awards ===
The ARIA Music Awards are presented annually from 1987 by the Australian Recording Industry Association (ARIA). Thirsty Merc have received four nominations.

Year	Nominee / work	Award	Result
2005	"In the Summertime" – Adrian Van De Velde – Thirsty Merc	Best Video	Nominated
2005	"Someday, Someday"	Single of the Year	Nominated
2005	"Someday, Someday"	Best Group	Nominated
2005	"Someday, Someday"	Best Pop Release	Nominated
