= Monsieur Camembert (album) =

Live album by Monsieur Camembert
- Released: 21 March 2005
- Recorded: 1999–2005
- Venue: Radio National, Sydney
- Genre: Jazz; World
- Length: 123:00
- Label: Monsieur Camembert/MGM

Monsieur Camembert chronology
Absynthe (2003)	Monsieur Camembert (2005)

Monsieur Camembert is the fourth album from Australian gypsy fusion band of the same name. It was independently released in March 2005 and distributed by MGM Distribution. The band's founder and lead vocalist Yaron Hallis listed their music styles as klezmer, gypsy, jazz, tango and Latin.

At the ARIA Music Awards of 2005 Monsieur Camembert won the Best World Music Album. Most of its tracks are from live concerts recorded for Australian Broadcasting Corporation's Radio National.

== Background ==
Australian gypsy fusion band Monsieur Camembert issued their fourth album as a 2×CD self-titled work comprising 20 tracks. The band's founding lead vocalist Yaron Hallis listed their music styles as klezmer, gypsy, jazz, tango and Latin. He had sifted through more than 100 concert tracks and demo versions from their work between 1999 and 2003, which had been played by 14 past and present band members. Aside from Hallis these included Svetlana Bunic on accordion and Edouard Bronson on saxophones, clarinet and flute.

== Track listing ==
=== Disc one ===
1. "Fiddler Feidman Medley" (Unreleased Live 2000)
2. "Money Money Money" (Unreleased Live 2000)
3. "From Russia with Love" (Unreleased Live 1999)
4. "Boulevard of Broken Dreams" (Unreleased Live 1999)
5. "Bide Manke" (Unreleased Live 1999)
6. "Odessa Bulgarish" (Unreleased Live 2002)
7. "Tziganskaia" (Unreleased Live 2001)
8. "(Just Another) Nail in the Cross" (Unreleased Live 2000)
9. "Caravan" (Unreleased Live 2002)
10. "Bohemian Rhapsody" (Unreleased Live 2000)

=== Disc two ===
1. "Swinging Both Ways" (Unreleased Live 2001)
2. "Merrygoround" (Unreleased Live 1999)
3. "Black Eyes" (Unreleased Live 2001)
4. "Eits Chayim" (Unreleased Demo 2000)
5. "Oneiro Demeno" (Unreleased Demo 2001)
6. "Dance Me to the End Of Love" (Unreleased Demo 2002)
7. "Hungarian Dance #5" (Unreleased Demo 2002)
8. "I Want You to Be My Baby" (Unreleased Live 2003)
9. "Besame Mucho" (Unreleased Demo 2003)
10. "Those Were the Days" (Unreleased Live 2000)
