= Gas Food Lodging (EP) =

EP by Drag
- Released: 3 June 2002
- Recorded: 2002
- Studio: Sunshine Studios, Brisbane; Milkbar Studios, Sydney
- Genre: Rock; pop
- Length: 21:57
- Label: Dew Process/Universal
- Producer: Wayne Connolly; Darren Middleton; Mark McElligott

Drag chronology
| Gas Food Lodging (2002) | The Way Out (2005) |

Drag or Gas Food Lodging is the debut extended play by Australian rock band, Drag, which was released in June 2002 via Dew Process/Universal Music Australia. The track, "Take Me with You", received airplay on Triple J radio after the EP was released.

The EP reached No. 19 on the ARIA Alternative Albums Chart and No. 6 on the ARIA Hitseekers Albums Chart. The group's founding guitarist and lead vocalist, Darren Middleton, later explained how the group's work was "universally themed and full of obscure metaphors that don't really mean anything, which is what I really did with Drag. There wasn't really any focus in that project."

== Track listing ==
1. "Nowhere but Here" – 4:55
2. "Secret Design" – 3:26
3. "H" – 0:07
4. "Take Me with You" – 4:07
5. "The Less You Know" – 3:43
6. "Thanks for Your Time" – 2:52
7. "On Top of It" – 3:05

== Personnel ==
- Darren Middleton – guitars, vocals
- Mark McElligott – drums, backing vocals
- Sean Hartman – bass guitar
- Matt Murphy – Wurlitzer piano, Hammond organ
- Wayne Connolly – backing vocals
- Calib James – strings (on "Secret Design")
