= Absynthe (album) =

Studio album by Monsieur Camembert
- Released: June 2003
- Recorded: 2003
- Genre: Jazz/World
- Length: 49:07
- Label: Monsieur Camembert

Monsieur Camembert chronology
| Live on Stage (2001) | Absynthe (2003) | Monsieur Camembert (2005) |

Absynthe is the third album from Australian Gypsy fusion band Monsieur Camembert. At the ARIA Music Awards of 2003 it won the ARIA Award for Best World Music Album. Most of the tracks are from a live concert recorded for ABC Radio National.

== Track listing ==
- All arrangements by Monsieur Camembert.
1. "Caravan" (Ellington/Mills/Tizol) – 5:28
2. "Adon Olam" (trad.) – 4:38
3. "Kiss Of Fire" (Allen/Hill) – 5:43
4. "Hungarian Dance #5" (J. Brahms) – 2:59
5. "Can I Have You, Please" (Erin Devenish) – 4:13
6. "Michto Pelo" (B. Ferre) – 5:51
7. "Full Tschel" (trad.) – 2:44
8. "Caminos Crusados" (E. Lecuona) – 5:24
9. "A Good Time Was Had By All" (Franklin) – 4:59
10. "Dance Me To The End Of Love" (L. Cohen) – 7:07
