= The Way Out (Drag album) =

Studio album by Drag
- Released: (Australia) 10 July 2005 (United States) 8 August 2005
- Recorded: Byron Bay; Early 2005
- Genre: Rock
- Label: Dew Process
- Producer: David Nicholas

Drag chronology
Gas Food Lodging (2002)	The Way Out (2005)

Singles from The Way Out
- 1. "You and I" Released: August 2005; 2. "Lady Luck" Released: October 2005

The Way Out is the debut album by Australian rock band Drag released 10 July 2005. Drag recorded and toured for the album while lead singer and guitarist Darren Middleton was on a break from his other band Powderfinger.

== Background ==
As Middleton was allowed time to devote to his own side project Drag, he and McElligott decided to fill out Drag to a full band lineup. initially enlisting Brisbane keyboardist Matt Murphy and fellow Powderfinger member John Collins on bass, Drag began performing around Brisbane and its surrounding areas. Middleton had intended recording some of the Drag songs in the hiatus time, but when the opportunity was offered by Paul Piticco, Powderfinger's manager and founder of Dew Process to record on Dew Process, Middleton accepted. Drag then recorded The Way Out in early 2005 at a recording studio in the Northern New South Wales beachside town Byron Bay. The band enlisted David Nicholas as the album's producer, known for his work with Elton John.

== Songs and singles ==
There were two singles released from The Way Out. "You and I" was released just prior to the album to radio and as a CD single. The song is a rock-electronic song with influences of new-wave music. The second single released was "Lady Luck" which was released in October 2005. According to the band, "Lady Luck" is the band's attempt at writing a Beatles styled song.

== Track listing ==
1. "Not So Innocent"
2. "Road That We Both Travel"
3. "You and I"
4. "Fading Out"
5. "Lady Luck"
6. "Long Way Home"
7. "Frustrated Writer"
8. "I Know You"
9. "You Will Save Me"
10. "Fall in the Haze"
11. "Inside Your Words"

== Personnel ==
- Darren Middleton – Guitar and vocals
- Sean Hartman – Bass guitar
- Matt Murphy – Keyboards
- Mark McElligott – Drums
- John Collins – Additional bass guitar

== Reception ==
Zombos Reviews gave the album a B−, saying that "All up, it's certainly not earth-shattering, but they don't embarrass themselves with anything hideously bad either. This one gets awarded a middling-to-high 10 for being "pleasant, but doesn't have any songs or melodies that are flatout brilliant." The reviewer did say that The Frustrated Writer was his favourite song on the album.
