= Drag (band) =

- Origin: Brisbane, Queensland, Australia
- Genres: Alternative rock, new wave
- Years active: 2000–present
- Label: Dew Process
- Members: Darren Middleton; Sean Hartman; Matt Murphy; Mark McElligott
- Past members: John Collins
- Website: Official website

Drag are an Australian rock band led by Darren Middleton, most known as the lead guitarist from rock group Powderfinger.

== History ==
Middleton started the band with drummer Mark McElligott, who is also the live engineer for Powderfinger, in 2000 as a side project. In 2002, the duo recorded the EP Gas Food Lodging, a small collection of original songs written specifically for Drag. For these recordings, they brought in local Brisbane musicians, bass player Sean Hartman and pianist Matt Murphy as session musicians to play on the EP. The band was given the chance to record a full-length studio album when Powderfinger took a few years off between albums. In this hiatus, Middleton and McElligott re-enlisted Hartman and Murphy and began playing live around Australia. The band signed with the record label Dew Process, the same label that co-Powderfinger member Bernard Fanning signed with and released his solo album. The band recorded their debut album in early 2005 in Byron Bay. The band named the album The Way Out and released it on 10 July 2005 in Australia and 8 August 2005 internationally. Following the album release, the band toured Australia again with UK band Athlete, then undertook a more extensive headlining tour in October.

== Discography ==
=== Albums ===
List of albums, with selected details
Title	Details
The Way Out	Released: July 2005; Format: CD, digital; Label: Dew Process (DEW90162)

=== Extended plays ===
List of EPs, with selected details
Title	Details
Gas Food Lodging	Released: June 2002; Format: CD; Label: Universal Music Australia (015 931-2)
