= Someday, Someday =

2004 single by Thirsty Merc

Single by Thirsty Merc

from the album Thirsty Merc
- B-side: "Stick to Your Guns"; "Emancipate Myself" (live); "Get Over Myself" (live)
- Released: 22 November 2004
- Label: WEA; Coady Music
- Songwriter: Rai Thistlethwayte
- Producers: Lindsay Gravina; Thirsty Merc

Thirsty Merc singles chronology
"My Completeness" (2004)	"Someday, Someday" (2004)	"In the Summertime" (2005)

"Someday, Someday" is the third single released from Australian pop rock band Thirsty Merc's debut album, Thirsty Merc (2004). The song was released on 22 November 2004 and reached number 19 on the Australian Singles Chart in January 2005.

== Music video ==
The music video features Thirsty Merc frontman Rai Thistlethwayte walking into a hotel and in the hotel lift singing the song, crossing the shot to his girlfriend, the two appear to be separated, as the song's chorus suggests "Someday, someday I will be there, babe. Someday, someday I will be the one, babe". It was used for the Channel Ten series première of American show House.

== Track listing ==
Australian CD single

1. "Someday, Someday" – 3:42
2. "Stick to Your Guns" – 4:06
3. "Emancipate Myself" (live) – 5:08
4. "Get Over Myself" (live) – 3:31
5. "My Completeness" (video)

== Charts ==
Chart (2004)	Peak position
Australia (ARIA)	19
