= Deepface (band) =

Dance/House/Electronica music act based out of Melbourne, Victoria, Australia

Deepface are an Australia dance, house and electronica music act based out of Melbourne, Victoria. It is the studio project for producer, engineer and musician Chris Corby.

== History ==
Deepface was formed in 2004 by Corby and Francine Power and became a successful fixture in their home country's Dance music scene. The group's first single, "Been Good," was originally included on a self-titled EP and later remixed by Grant Smillie and Ivan Gough (of TV Rock fame), and became a major smash on the ARIA club and dance charts. At the ARIA Music Awards of 2005 the song was nominated for ARIA Award for Best Dance Release.

In 2006 Deepface returned to the ARIA club and dance charts with "I Want To Live", which was lifted off their debut album "Feel the Love," which was released in October 2007. The track, which has also been remixed by Chris Corby and Andy Page, has already crossed over the Pacific, where it charted on the Billboard Hot Dance Club Play chart, peaking at number 18 (in the 19 May 2007 issue).

In March 2007 Deepface was signed to Red Stick Recordings, the Strictly Rhythm Records imprint in the United States. Both the first single of "I Want To Live" (in its original version) and the Trevor Simpson vs Deepface remixes are both available commercially and has gained radio airplay in the States.

== Discography ==
=== Albums ===
List of albums
Title	Album details
Feel the Love	Released: October 2007; Label: Fly Music (5101168642); Format: CD

=== Extended plays ===
List of EPs
Title	EP details
Deepface	Released: 2004; Label: The Devils Music (70362); Format: CD

=== Singles ===
List of singles as lead artist, with selected chart positions and certifications
Title	Year	Peak chart positions	Album
Title	Year	AUS	Album
"Been Good"	2005	56	Deepface
"I Want to Live"	2006	-	Feel the Love
"Let's Get It On Tonight" (with Pitch Dark)	2011	-	non-album single

== Awards and nominations ==
=== ARIA Music Awards ===
The ARIA Music Awards is an annual awards ceremony that recognises excellence, innovation, and achievement across all genres of Australian music.

Year	Nominee / work	Award	Result
2005	"Been Good"	Best Dance Release	Nominated
