= Rai Thistlethwayte =

Australian singer-songwriter

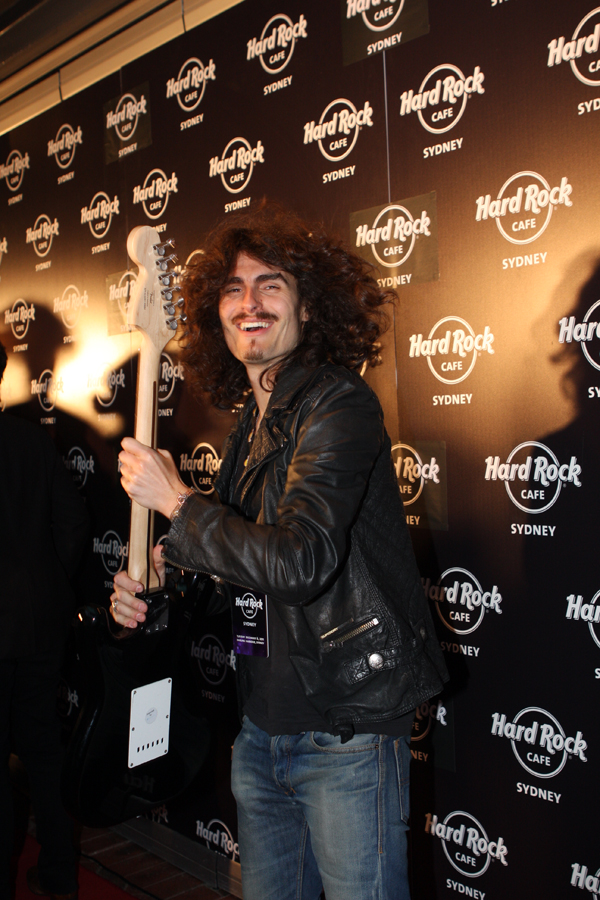
- Thistlethwayte in 2011
- Born: 21 April 1980 (age 46); Westmead, New South Wales, Australia
- Other name: Sun Rai
- Years active: 2000–present
- Known for: Lead singer and primary songwriter in Thirsty Merc
- Partner: Jade Stoddart (2023-present)
- Website: https://raithis.com/

Rai Thistlethwayte (born 21 April 1980) is an Australian rock, pop and jazz musician and songwriter. Thistlethwayte is an accomplished pianist, guitarist, and vocalist. He is the lead singer, rhythm guitarist, and primary songwriter in the Australian pop rock band Thirsty Merc. From 2004, Thirsty Merc released a string of hits in the Australian charts including "In the Summertime", "Someday, Someday", "20 Good Reasons", "Emancipate Myself", "My Completeness", "When the Weather Is Fine" and "Mousetrap Heart". He is currently based in Melbourne. As a solo artist, Thistlethwayte performs under the name 'Sun Rai'.

== Early life ==
Thistlethwayte was born and raised in Sydney, New South Wales, and attended Beaumont Road Public School then Knox Grammar School. Born into a musical family, he started learning from his mother, a classical piano teacher, before his fifth birthday. His father, Ian, is a language teacher and a bass player and guitarist who played bass in a Sydney-based band called 'The Plebs', which formed under the name 'The Centaurs' in Sydney in 1963.

In his early teens, Thistlethwayte listened to classic rock and early metal, then blues and jazz. He started writing songs around the age of 15. After finishing high school in 1997 he was awarded a scholarship to the Sydney Conservatorium of Music where he commenced a Bachelor of Music in jazz piano in 1998.

Some of his early musical influences are listed as The Beach Boys, Buddy Holly, Deep Purple, Cream, Jimi Hendrix, Iron Maiden, Stevie Wonder, Donny Hathaway, Prince, Frank Sinatra, Joni Mitchell, Mahavishnu Orchestra, Chick Corea, Keith Jarrett, Oscar Peterson and Claude Debussy.

== Music career ==
=== 2000–2001: "Give a Smile to the Planet" ===
After a year at the Sydney Conservatorium, Thistlethwayte came to the attention of, and signed with Columbia/Sony in the United States. He released one single, "Give a Smile to the Planet", which was released in Australia in mid-2000 and peaked at number 88, and completed an album featuring production by Full Force which was released as a promo in Australia and the US but only officially released in Mexico.

=== 2003–present: Thirsty Merc ===
In 2002, Thistlethwayte formed the rock band Thirsty Merc and was subsequently signed by Warner Music Australia. Thirsty Merc subsequently released three successful albums, their self-titled debut Thirsty Merc, which sold twice platinum in Australia and received four ARIA Award nominations, and Sideshows that has reached Platinum status. Thirsty Merc released their third studio album in June 2010 Mousetrap Heart with the title track as the first single, and the hit 'Tommy And Krista' and 'All My Life' being released as singles. Thistlethwayte and the band's live performances are known for their high energy and strong musicianship. The "Mousetrap Heart" era led the band to numerous tours, the largest being an extensive, multi city and regional tour of Australia and New Zealand. This tour was called the "Rock Your Socks Off Tour" and ended in mid November 2011.

=== 2009–present: Sun Rai ===
Thistlethwayte performs solo under the artist name 'Sun Rai.' From April to May 2009, Thistlethwayte toured the Australian east coast as a solo artist for the first time, where he simultaneously played bass with his left hand on a synthesiser, while playing keyboards with his right hand and singing, along with Matt Smith (guitar) and Al Hicks (drums). He played a second run of shows at the end of 2011, this time purely solo. In July 2012, Thistlethwayte commenced a national Australian headline tour. He moved to Los Angeles in mid 2012. In late 2012 he started performing under the name 'Sun Rai' (pronounced "Sun Ray"), mainly around Los Angeles. In 2013 he formed a new Facebook page for Sun Rai and started releasing music through his own social networks, usually using a 'pay what you want' business model. In June 2013 he opened for Norwegian one man band, loop pedal artist and soul singer "Bernhoft" around the United States and Canada. He opened for ZZ Ward in Atlantic City. He played a late night set after "Puss in Boots" (an all-female group featuring Norah Jones) at Rockwood Music Hall in New York City in June 2013. His debut release as Sun Rai, a four-track EP entitled 'Pocket Music,' was self-released on 4 June 2013. Track 1 from Pocket Music, 'San Francisco Street,' has been played extensively on KCRW and featured on blogs such as 'Filter Magazine.' His music was also recently featured during the second season of House of Lies. He toured the United States and Canada in October and November 2013 opening for Danish indie-pop singer "Oh Land". In January 2014, Sun Rai collaborated with jazz drummer Ben Vanderwal at Sound Baker Studios in Perth, Western Australia. They primarily tracked live in the studio, and recorded an EP entitled 'Escargot.' It was released independently in April 2014, and subsequently the two artists embarked on a successful Australian tour, playing two nights at Bennetts Lane Jazz Club in Melbourne, Venue 505 in Sydney, Smith's Alternative Bookshop in Canberra, and also a sold-out show at the Perth International Jazz Festival in June 2014. From May 2025, Thistlethwayte was performing as a member of Sammy Hagar’s band on tour and at his Las Vegas “Best of All Worlds” residency along with bassist Michael Anthony, guitarist Joe Satriani, and drummer Kenny Aronoff. He is now part of the touring line-up of Toto.

== Jazz ==
As well as his work in rock and pop, Thistlethwayte has performed in a number of jazz combos with many Australian jazz musicians, including ARIA award-winning guitarist James Muller, American jazz bassist Christian McBride, trumpeter James Morrison, tenor saxophonist Dale Barlow and Phil Stack, who also plays bass in Thirsty Merc. In 2008, Thistlethwayte performed a concert with respected Australian jazz pianist and composer Mark Isaacs at the Brisbane Jazz Festival. Isaacs is on record as saying, "It's a well-kept secret that Rai is an outstanding jazz pianist… I consider Rai the most exciting young jazz pianist to emerge in this country in recent years." He has performed solo at the Wangaratta Jazz Festival and twice at the Stonnington Jazz Festival in Melbourne, once in 2011 and 2012. He is also the regular guest keyboardist in the Sydney rock and jazz fusion group "The Subterraneans". Thistlethwayte also writes spoken word prose and poetry, sometimes performing and recording under the name "Michael Albatross". In June 2014, alongside Australian jazz trumpeter James Morrison, Thistlethwayte adjudicated the vocal competition at "Generations In Jazz" in Mount Gambier, South Australia. He also performed there with improvising vocal group The Idea Of North and also James Morrison himself. Thistlethwayte was a participant in the Creative Music Workshop at the Banff Centre, Canada, in 2014, and studied improvised music and Carnatic singing under Aruna Sairam, Steve Coleman and Vijay Iyer. He has also featured as a guest musician with the electronic group Knower, and can be seen performing in the live video clips of their tracks "Overtime", "Time Traveler" as well as "It's All Nothing Until It's Everything" and "The Abyss".

== Co-writing, masterclasses and work as session musician ==
Thistlethwayte co-wrote the song "12 Hours" with The Whitlams' Tim Freedman, album title track "Happy Home" with The Voice runner up Darren Percival (Universal Music Australia), the first single "Goodnight America" (Universal Music Australia) for upcoming female artist 'Sinead Burgess.'

He played piano on two songs for ex-Silverchair drummer Ben Gillies' solo album, was the piano player on the singles "You Won't Let Me", by Karise Eden, "Happy Home", and "In The Blowing Wind" performed by Darren Percival and Sarah De Bono's cover of Duffy's Warwick Avenue for the TV series The Voice. He played multiple instruments on 5 songs for Brian McFadden's record to be released in late 2012: bass, guitar, drum programming and piano.

Thistlethwayte played piano and keyboards on 13 tracks for The Voice Xmas album, for release at the end of 2012.

He composed a short song "Out of the Blue" for the 2012 film Eugene, a short as part of A Series of Films with Roman Coppola and the Directors Bureau, put together by Vice magazine, W Hotels and ultrabook computers. The song was used as a musical theatre piece in the film, sung and acted by Ben Lee and Sunny Mabrey.

Thistlethwayte has taught masterclasses at The Australian Institute of Music, Lismore University, Claremont College and Blacktown Tafe and has been a mentor at Song Summit from 2010 to 2012, a week-long annual songwriting conference hosted by APRA, of which he is an Ambassador. He attended the 'Bali Songwriting Retreat' in Ubud, Bali, in 2011, along with Bonnie McKee, Delta Goodrem, Nick Jonas and Arnthor Birigisson. Thistlethwayte taught songwriting masterclasses at numerous schools for part of "SongMakers" for APRA, a government funded initiative designed to introduce songwriting into high schools.

He performs regularly with Louis Cole and his band Knower. He is currently on tour with Toto, and previously toured with Sammy Hagar.

== Personal life ==
Thistlethwayte dated Aimee Osbourne, daughter of rocker Ozzy Osbourne and celebrity personality Sharon Osbourne. Thistlethwayte and Osbourne began their relationship after meeting at the 2004 MTV Awards in Sydney.

== Discography ==
=== Singles ===
List of solo singles, with selected chart positions
Title	Year	Peak chart positions
Title	Year	AUS
"Give a Smile to the Planet"	2000	88

== Awards and nominations ==
=== APRA Awards ===
The APRA Awards are presented annually from 1982 by the Australasian Performing Right Association (APRA), "honouring composers and songwriters".

Year	Nominee / work	Award	Result
2006	"Someday, Someday" – Thirsty Merc (Rai Thistlethwayte)	Most Played Australian Work	Nominated
2008	"20 Good Reasons" – Thirsty Merc (Rai Thistlethwayte)	Most Played Australian Work	Nominated
2008	"20 Good Reasons" – Thirsty Merc (Rai Thistlethwayte)	Song of the Year	Nominated
2017	"The Good Life" – Thirsty Merc (Jon Hume, Rai Thistlethwayte)	Rock Work of the Year	Nominated
