= Phil Stack =

Australian jazz and rock musician (born 1977)

- Born: Phillip Barry Stack; 1977 (age 48–49); Dubbo, New South Wales, Australia
- Genres: Jazz, rock
- Occupation: Musician
- Instruments: Double bass, bass guitar
- Years active: 1996–present

Phillip Barry Stack (born 1977) is an Australian jazz and rock musician. He is the founding bass guitarist of the pop rock band Thirsty Merc since 2002, the regular double bassist for jazz musician James Morrison and leader of the ensemble called Phil Stack Trio. He is also in several other groups Drown, House of Orange, and Lily Dior Quartet.

Stack grew up with his three older sisters in the New South Wales city of Dubbo. He studied at the Sydney Conservatorium of Music in his earlier years and is now a regular feature at major rock and jazz festivals.

In November 2008, Stack won first place in the National Jazz Awards at the Melbourne Jazz Festival. After the initial ten finalists were reduced to three, he beat Ben Waples (Sydney) and Sam Anning (Melbourne) in the final.
